= Nate Kinski =

- Neighbours character
- Portrayed by: Meyne Wyatt
- Duration: 2014–2016
- First appearance: 18 August 2014
- Last appearance: 2 June 2016
- Introduced by: Jason Herbison
In-universe information
- Occupation: Soldier; Garden nursery assistant Bar manager SES volunteer
- Father: Leo Kinski
- Uncles: Alex Kinski

Nate Kinski is a fictional character from the Australian soap opera Neighbours, played by Meyne Wyatt. The actor sent a taped audition to the show's casting agent and was invited to the studios for a call-back, before learning he had won the role. Wyatt relocated to Melbourne for filming and became the first indigenous actor to join the regular cast of Neighbours since the show began in 1985. Wyatt made his first screen appearance during the episode broadcast on 18 August 2014. The character departed on 2 June 2016.

Nate was introduced through a loose connection to Susan Kennedy (Jackie Woodburne), who was once married to his uncle. Nate is a former soldier, who was initially portrayed as being mysterious and closed-off. Wyatt branded Nate "a complex character" and said that his heart was in the right place. Nate's storylines have often focused on his struggle with posttraumatic stress disorder and how it affects his relationships with other people. The character is openly gay and had relationships with Chris Pappas (James Mason) and Aaron Brennan (Matt Wilson). He has also been at the centre of a storyline concerning the bike-versus-car debate, which was a prominent news story in Australia at the time. Nate has received mostly positive attention from viewers and critics. He was named Favourite Newcomer at the 2014 Soap Extra Awards.

== Creation and casting ==
Nate's arrival was first teased by executive producer Jason Herbison in late June 2014. Herbison confirmed that Chris Pappas (James Mason) would be getting a new love interest, who would also be a regular cast member, unlike his previous partners who had only been recurring. On 20 July, it was announced that Meyne Wyatt had joined the cast of Neighbours as Nate Kinski. Wyatt sent a taped audition to the show's casting agent and was later asked to provide another, which helped to show his range as an actor. Wyatt was then flown to Melbourne for a call-back, where he acted out a scene alongside Mason. He learned that he had won the part a week later. Wyatt relocated to Melbourne where the Neighbours studios are located, and he began filming two and a half months before his casting announcement.

Wyatt is the first indigenous actor to join the regular cast since the show began in 1985. Executive producer Jason Herbison told Elissa Blake from The Sydney Morning Herald that the decision to cast an indigenous actor was "unintentional" and Wyatt had stood out as the best actor for the role following his audition. Herbison explained, "[The role] was not written as an Aboriginal character, however as the character is not a blood relative of existing characters, there were no ethnicity limitations. We could craft the character's background story if necessary to suit the actor cast in the role." Wyatt's casting came shortly after a Fairfax Media report about indigenous actors was published, in which they branded the Australian television industry "whitebread" and asked for casting calls to be "colour-blind". Wyatt made his debut appearance as Nate on 18 August 2014.

== Development ==
=== Introduction and characterisation ===
Wyatt explained that Nate comes to Erinsborough to attend the funeral of a friend. He has a connection to long-term character Susan Kennedy (Jackie Woodburne) as she was married to his late uncle Alex Kinski (Andrew Clarke). Wyatt said Nate was "very lucky" that Susan and her husband Karl (Alan Fletcher) welcomed him into their house with open arms. Wyatt also confirmed that Susan would become "a mother figure" to Nate and they would form a friendship. In his fictional backstory, Nate is originally from Karratha. He enrolled in the Australian infantry and completed two tours of duty in Afghanistan. After quitting the army, Nate travelled around the world.

Wyatt called Nate "a complex character" and said he would initially be "closed-off", as well as being an "unpredictable element" within the cast. Wyatt stated, "he could be misunderstood, but once some secrets are revealed about his background, you can gain an understanding of why he does the things he does. But before that, he's definitely a man of mystery." Wyatt also said Nate's heart would be in the right place, but his behaviour would be weird. Nate's profile on the show's official website states that he is an "alpha male", "super polite" and occasionally comes across as being dull. Nate is openly gay, having known from an early age. Wyatt explained that as a heterosexual actor, this was a "new layer to explore" and a reason that he found the character so interesting. He confirmed that Nate's lighter side would be seen, promising that it was not all "doom and gloom" with him.

In 2015, Wyatt explained that Nate had changed a lot since his first appearance and was "definitely more relaxed". He had developed new connections and friendships with other characters like Tyler Brennan (Travis Burns), which brought out new sides to his character. Wyatt added that Nate's "lighter side" had started to come out and was not "as insane" as he had once been.

=== Post-traumatic stress ===
Wyatt told Claire Crick from All About Soap that some of the things Nate experienced during his tours of Afghanistan had left him in "a dark place" and struggling to adapt to life away from the army. His aggressive behaviour is a result of posttraumatic stress disorder and Wyatt explained, "he doesn't intentionally mean to be violent – it's just that his experiences in the army have really affected him." After Nate pinned Chris Pappas against a wall, he confided in Susan and told her about his past. Wyatt said it was a huge relief to Nate when Susan was understanding of his condition. When she later asked him to give a talk at the local high school, with the intention of trying to help, Nate was scared and things became too much for him. Wyatt commented that Nate was not ready for normal life yet. He also explained that Nate's PTSD was "a cool challenging storyline" for him and he researched the subject thoroughly to do it justice. Speaking to Shannon Molloy of news.com.au, Wyatt commented that Nate's PTSD was interesting to him and made the character stand out.

While out with Susan, Nate lost his temper at an obnoxious driver. Susan was shocked by Nate's sudden outburst, but she was also sympathetic as she realised where it was coming from. Woodburne explained, "Nate is suffering from post-traumatic stress syndrome, which manifests itself in sudden bursts of anger triggered by loud noises and people arguing. There are also nightmares, which are pretty awful for him." When Karl learned of the incident, he told Susan that Nate could no longer stay with them and she agreed. Nate was also in agreement, but he then opened up to Susan about his experiences in Afghanistan, causing her to soften towards him. Nate told Susan "a terrible" story about a young girl, which she found difficulty comprehending as events like that do not happen in Australia. Realising that Nate needed her, she agreed to act as his "sounding board".

Nate later sought help from a professional counsellor and initially made some progress, but then went back to being "emotionally explosive". Susan offered to listen to Nate as an "informal therapist" again. Woodburne commented, "He's also not sleeping, and Chris tells Susan that Nate had been having nightmares again." Susan became worried about Nate's suspicious behaviour and when she saw him leave the house with a shovel, she followed him and saw Nate digging a large hole in the ground. Susan found it odd, as it looked like Nate was digging a grave. When Nate heard a noise, he left the hole to investigate. Susan then went over for a closer look, but slipped and knocked herself out when she hit the ground. When Nate returned, he began filling in the hole, unaware that Susan was lying unconscious at the bottom. Woodburne said the storyline was true to life, as digging holes is a form of discipline for Australian soldiers. She told Inside Soap's Sarah Ellis that Nate remembered getting a good night's sleep after digging holes due to being exhausted. She said that she liked the idea of the storyline and joked that Susan had been through many things, but had never fallen in a hole before.

=== Relationship with Chris Pappas ===
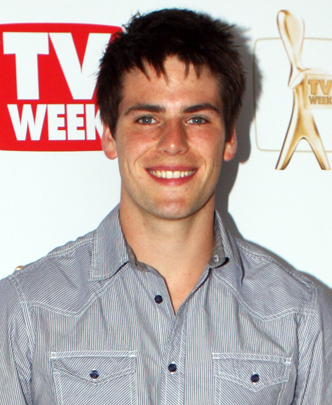
Nate's first love interest was Chris Pappas played by James Mason (pictured).

A reporter for Channel 5 said Nate would develop a romance with one of Ramsay Street's established residents. It was later confirmed that Nate's love interest would be Chris Pappas (Mason). Wyatt stated there would be "an instant connection" between Chris and Nate. But while Chris is very open, Nate is the opposite and although he let Chris know that he was interested, he did not allow himself to show much emotion. Chris and Nate's relationship got off to a bad start when Chris witnessed Nate assaulting a stranger during a picnic with their friends, but Georgia Brooks (Saskia Hampele) encouraged him to give Nate another chance and Chris agreed. While out for a drink, Chris became worried about Nate's "erratic behaviour" and when Karl and Susan later found a knife in Nate's bag, he decided to leave town. But during his goodbye with Chris, they shared their first kiss and Chris convinced Nate to stay.

When Chris tried to get Nate to open up about his life in the army, Nate shoved him against a wall, leaving Chris shaken. Chris told Nate that he would not stand for him being violent again, which Nate accepted. Mason said, "I think it's a really good sign that Nate does listen to that. It's a hurdle in their relationship which they've jumped over." Mason also confirmed that Nate would open up to Chris about his past and viewers would get to see them having fun as a couple. Chris and Nate's relationship was tested when Chris was attacked during Georgia and Kyle Canning (Chris Milligan) bucks and hens party. During the party, Chris "curtly dismisses" Nate and has to throw Josh Willis (Harley Bonner) out for starting a fight. Josh later returned and punched Chris, leaving him with serious injuries. However, Nate was the initial suspect due to his "aloof" behaviour and past incidents.

Nate later drove Josh out to the bush, intending to hurt him, but when Josh expressed his remorse, Nate let him leave. Realising that Chris would have a difficult road to recovery, Nate was "daunted" about their future and confessed to an unconscious Chris that their relationship was so new "he feels disconnected from his life". Nate's anxiety increased due to Chris's injuries, which made him forgetful and moody. Nate later suffered a panic attack and questioned whether he would be able to care for Chris. This was not helped by Chris's mother, Patricia (Katerina Kotsonis), who questioned Nate's commitment to her son. When Chris collapsed after a seizure, he was kept in the hospital overnight putting his plans with Nate on hold. Nate decided to sneak into the hospital to spend time with him, making Chris realise that their relationship was serious. Nate then declared his love for Chris and Mason said, "Chris has had trouble reading Nate, because he's been so guarded about his past. But now they both seem to be on the same page at last."

Early on in their relationship, Chris revealed to Nate that he was considering fathering a child with Lucy Robinson (Melissa Bell). Wyatt said that while Nate and Chris would have to discuss the situation eventually, Nate would let Chris deal with it on his own until then. When Lucy returned to Erinsborough, the subject was brought up again and Chris struggled with his decision when Nate told him that he did not want to have children. Believing that his relationship could be jeopardised, Chris initially rejected Lucy's offer, which left Nate feeling guilty. After getting to know Lucy, Nate encouraged Chris to have a baby with her. When Lucy became pregnant, Chris realised that he wanted to be as involved as possible and was prepared to move to New York part-time. This left Nate feeling "sidelined" and "rail-roaded" into moving to a new country. He told Susan that he was unsure what Chris wanted from him and reiterated that he did not want children or to relocate to New York. Chris and Nate decided to end their relationship, and Wyatt commented that it was "a long time coming".

=== Cycling debate and career change ===
In May 2015, the show used Nate and Imogen Willis (Ariel Kaplan) to show the two sides of the bike-versus-car debate that was a "hot topic" in Australia at the time. While out cycling with the local mamil group, Nate almost crashed into Imogen. She later caused Nate's bike to fall over and he gave her a lecture about making unnecessary car journeys, before they became involved in a heated argument. Wyatt explained that Nate and Imogen had strong opinions about the subject, but Imogen was more determined to win, while Nate enjoyed winding her up. Wyatt called her "an easy target". Later that same day, Imogen opened her car door without looking, just as Nate was cycling past, and caused him to fall to the ground. Nate was not badly injured, but his ego was bruised. Wyatt commented, "He hurts his knee and his arm; the make-up department did a great job messing me up!" Wyatt also explained that the stunt was choreographed for maximum impact and took a long time to film. An angry Nate accused Imogen of hurting him on purpose, and was tempted to contact a lawyer, but when he saw that Imogen genuinely felt bad about the incident, he decided to play "the sympathy card" for as long as possible.

When Nate quit his job at Sonya Mitchell's (Eve Morey) garden nursery, he wanted his new job to have a similar level of responsibly. Ezra Hanley (Steve Nation) later offered Nate a job as trainee manager at the Waterhole pub, he was initially unaware of the trouble that Ezra had caused by offering him Sheila Canning's (Colette Mann) job. Nate accepted Ezra's offer and Sheila then tried to get Nate to fight Ezra with her, but instead he told her off. When he went to make it up to her, he ended up in trouble with Ezra and decided to quit. However, Sheila refused to let him go and upon learning that Ezra planned to steal customers from a rival bar, she persuaded Nate to work with her to stop Ezra. Sheila and Nate decided to convince Ezra that they did not get along, by throwing insults at each other. Nate was unsure of the plan, but eventually went along with it and got "a bit too carried away". However, Ezra believed Nate and confided in him about his plans to redevelop the Waterhole and get rid of Sheila. Sheila also went too far when she called Nate a coward for not dating since Chris left. Sheila encouraged Nate to talk to customer Alistair Hall (Nick Cain), but when Alistair realised Nate was gay, he went on "a homophobic tirade" leaving Nate hurt.

=== Relationship with Aaron Brennan ===
Shortly after Tyler's older brother Aaron (Matt Wilson) moved to Ramsay Street, Tyler tried to set him up with Nate. Their first meeting did not go well, as they realised that they had nothing in common and Nate did not want anything to do with Aaron. Aaron later got involved with Nate and Alistair's feud and tried to help. Wilson commented that "Nate definitely doesn't take too kindly to his game-playing!" Aaron and Nate were later forced to spend time together when Naomi Canning (Morgana O'Reilly) locked them in an outdoor room with a glass front as part of a promotion for Lassiter's Hotel. Wyatt told an Inside Soap columnist that Nate tried to make the most of the situation and believed he could annoy Aaron in the process. He said, "Initially it's a pretty weird situation, because all these people are watching them, and Nate is pretty grumpy. But after a while Nate doesn't even notice the audience and starts to lighten up, which surprises Aaron." In a bid to please the audience, Nate acted out a spontaneous kiss with Aaron, which he enjoyed. It soon became clear that Nate had started to develop feelings for Aaron and Wyatt thought the characters were "a good balance", but it would depend on how much they could be themselves around each other.

When Aaron attempted to cheer up Josh by finding him a new girlfriend, he put himself in danger when her boyfriend Evan Shields (Daniel Fischer) appeared. Josh attempted to defuse the situation, but when Aaron was walking home, Evan threw a drink in his face and attacked him. Nate then came to Aaron's rescue and dragged Evan away, before scaring him off. However, before Aaron had a chance to thank Nate, he suddenly left the scene due as his PTS was triggered. Neither Aaron and Nate were willing to accept that they had romantic feelings for each other. Nate was also under the impression that Aaron was not interested in a pursuing a relationship with him. When Aaron offered to be his man-slave for the week to make up for injuring him during Tai Chi, Nate was unaware Aaron was actually flirting with him. When Aaron admitted to having feelings for him, Nate thought Aaron was joking and left him "crushed" by the rejection. Tyler then had to tell Nate that his brother was attracted to him.

Aaron and Nate eventually developed a relationship, but after Nate got involved in a fight, he decided to leave town to clear his head. Aaron was "angry and upset" when he learnt that Nate had returned to Australia and had not been in contact with him. Wilson hoped Aaron and Nate would reunite, but noted that as much as the couple loved each other, they could not live with each other because they are opposites. He added, "They do complement one another, though – Nate is really closed off, whereas Aaron is a lot more free and happy." When he eventually returned to town, Nate struggled to reconnect with Aaron and was "gutted" to learn that Aaron had moved on with Tom Quill (Kane Felsinger) while he was away. However, Nate continued to support Aaron when he believed that his actions had led to Tom's death in the Lassiter's Hotel explosion.

=== Departure ===
The character departed the show on 2 June 2016. Nate's decision was to "return to his roots" and rejoin the army. Shortly after learning that his application had been accepted, Nate asked Aaron to leave Erinsborough with him, but Aaron turned the offer down. Nate then said his goodbyes to Karl, Susan and his friends before departing Ramsay Street.

== Storylines ==
Nate arrives in Erinsborough to attend a funeral. He stays with his uncle's widow, Susan Kennedy, and her husband Karl. Nate meets Chris Pappas and agrees to go out for a drink with him. Nate attends a picnic with Chris, where he attacks a drunk. Karl and Susan question Nate about a knife they found in his bag and he refuses to talk to them. He decides to leave, but Chris kisses him and convinces him to stay. Nate tells Susan and Karl that the knife is a souvenir from his time in the army. After a tornado hits Erinsborough, Nate recognises that Susan is suffering from shock and he counsels her through her trauma. Chris asks Nate to open up to him about his time in Afghanistan, but Nate aggressively pins Chris up against a wall. Nate talks to students at the high school about his army career, but he breaks down and Susan suspects he is suffering from posttraumatic stress disorder. Chris learns Nate was convicted of a serious assault after leaving the army. Nate refuses to discuss it and Chris eventually dismisses him from Kyle and Georgia's bucks and hens party.

Chris is attacked and seriously injured by Josh Willis. Nate struggles to support Chris as he does not know him that well and lashes out at Susan. She agrees to counsel him, but she cannot cope with Nate's stories and he finds a professional therapist. When Nate suffers from nightmares, he begins digging holes to cure his insomnia. Susan follows him one night and falls into the hole. Nate almost buries Susan alive, but rescues her just in time. He then finds a new therapist. Nate tells Chris that he does not want children, causing Chris to reject Lucy Robinson's offer to father her child. Chris changes his mind and Lucy falls pregnant, putting strain on Nate and Chris's relationship. When Chris decides that he wants to be more involved in his child's life, he makes plans for him and Nate to move to New York for three months. But Nate realises that they want different things and they break up. Nate befriends Tyler Brennan and Susan encourages him to attend an Anzac Day event to help with his PTSD. He also befriends Imogen Willis, after she accidentally hits him with her car door while he is out cycling.

Nate quits his job at the garden nursery and is offered the bar manager's job at the Waterhole by Ezra Hanley. Sheila Canning is initially hostile towards Nate for stealing her job, but they team up to discover Ezra's plans for the bar. Nate attempts to ask Alistair Hall out on a date, but Alistair launches into a homophobic tirade and tells him he is not gay. Nate goes on a date with Brett Holden (Oliver Coleman), but Alistair shows up and Brett leaves. Alistair apologises for his behaviour and suddenly kisses Nate. He later tries to pass off the kiss as a drunken mistake, but Nate suspects that Alistair is hiding his sexuality. Tyler tries to set Nate up with his brother Aaron Brennan, but they have nothing in common. Alistair's fiancée, Coco Lee (Sophie Cheeseman) asks Susan to act as their celebrant, but when Susan refuses, Coco asks Nate for an explanation and he tells her about the kiss. Alistair threatens to report Susan for a breach of confidentiality, unless Nate takes back what he said. Nate refuses and Aaron convinces Alistair to drop the complaint. Nate and Aaron are forced to spend time together in a box as part of a promotion for Lassiter's. After initial tension, they start to get along and Nate kisses Aaron to please the audience.

Nate comes to Aaron's rescue when he is attacked by a man from the bar, but he leaves before Aaron can thank him. When Aaron tries to find his rescuer, believing that they might be soul mates, Nate eventually owns up and explains that he left because he suffered a panic attack due to his PTSD. Aaron later tells Nate that he likes him, but Nate does not initially believe him. However, they arrange a first date which goes well and they begin dating. Nate later grows uncomfortable with Aaron's job as an exotic dancer. After witnessing Dennis Dimato (David Serafin) hit Michelle Kim (Ra Chapman), Nate attacks Dimato. Traumatised by his own behaviour, Nate intends to confess to the police, while Aaron gets Karl to treat Dimato's injuries. Upon hearing that Dimato has threatened Karl and Susan, Nate decides to leave Erinsborough for a while to protect them, and to regain control of himself. He leaves quietly without telling anyone except Aaron, with whom he exchanges a tearful farewell.

Months later, Nate returns to Erinsborough in his capacity as an SES volunteer to help out at the Lassiter's explosion site. He co-ordinates the rescue of Toadfish Rebecchi (Ryan Moloney). Nate apologises to Aaron for not contacting him when he returned to Australia, and asks if they can try to go back to how things were before. Aaron tells Nate that he did not wait for him when he was away, and he had a relationship with Tom Quill. Resuming their relationship, Nate helps Aaron when he is being blackmailed by Tom, and later gives him money to set up his new business. Nate decides to re-enlist in the Army and asks Aaron to come with him, but he turns Nate down. Nate says his goodbyes to Aaron, Karl, Susan and Tyler, before leaving.

== Reception ==
"Nate's arrival in the fictional Melbourne suburb of Erinsborough was a big talking point for fans of the show. Wyatt's portrayal of the troubled and mysterious character came as a shock, it seems. But as a softer side slowly emerges, those viewers are warming to Wyatt and his delivery of something that's a bit different to the Neighbours norm."

— Shannon Molloy of news.com.au on the viewer response to Nate. (2014)

For his portrayal of Nate, Wyatt was named Favourite Newcomer at the 2014 Soap Extra Awards. Anthony D. Langford from TheBacklot.com liked that Nate's backstory was not dragged out and he commented, "I do love that Nate is not your average gay character and I'm really looking forward to the story as it unfolds." Langford thought there was little chemistry between Nate and Chris, and felt that they would be better off as friends. He also thought Wyatt initially appeared "stiff" in the role, but believed that it was part of Nate's "distant and remote" personality and he would eventually loosen up. Langford later praised Nate's PTSD story, saying that it had been "well depicted", and the realistic approach to Chris and Nate's lives and stories beyond their relationship.

Susie O'Brien for The Advertiser observed that Nate's arrival and his PTSD storyline would not have occurred in the early years of Neighbours and said it "reflected changing social times". Daniel Kilkelly noted that Nate's PTSD was a good example of Neighbours giving its storylines "time to breathe" and making sure that they had plausible conclusions. When Chris suffered a seizure, a reporter for The Sunday Mail commented that Nate "deals admirably with the situation". After Imogen and Nate's debate about bicycles vs cars, a Daily Record journalist noted that "a surprising friendship begins to form between the pair". In June 2015, Langford stated that he had begun to like Nate more since the show had "fleshed him out" and he and Wyatt were no longer "stiff and awkward". Langford added that he would like to see Neighbours explore Nate's army past further. Tim Falk from TV Soap praised both the actor and character, saying "Wyatt has lit up the screen as the multifaceted and beguiling Nate Kinski." A Sunday Mail contributor thought Nate was an "unlikely nemesis" for Dimato. They continued, "regrettably, simply leaving him injured for slapping Michelle may be the most sensible thing Nate has ever done."
