= List of Neighbours characters introduced in 2015 =

Neighbours is an Australian television soap opera. It was first broadcast on 18 March 1985 and currently airs on digital channel Eleven. The following is a list of characters that appeared in the soap in 2015, by order of first appearance. All characters are introduced by the shows executive producer Jason Herbison. The 31st season of Neighbours began airing from 5 January 2015. Cat Rogers began appearing in the same month, while Michelle Kim, Tyler Brennan and Nick Petrides made their debuts in February. Jimmy Williams, Aaron Brennan and Mary Smith were introduced in June. Russell Brennan arrived during July and Courtney Grixti began appearing from August. September saw Piper Willis make her debut and Shay Daeng was introduced in October. Cecilia Saint was introduced in November.

== Cat Rogers ==
Cat Rogers
- Neighbours character
- Portrayed by: Maleeka Gasbarri
- First appearance: 19 January 2015
- Last appearance: 3 February 2015
- Introduced by: Jason Herbison
In-universe information
- Mother: Erin Rogers

Catriona "Cat" Rogers, played by Maleeka Gasbarri, made her first screen appearance on 19 January 2015. The character's picture was previously seen in the episode broadcast on 28 November 2014, while Gasbarri's casting was announced on 15 January 2015. Gasbarri was cast in the month-long guest role after she was spotted by a Neighbours casting agent at an Australian Film and Television Academy course in Perth. Gasbarri filmed an audition tape in her home town of Dunsborough and sent it into them. She continued, "They said I had gotten the role and had to be there in two weeks to start filming. It was a bit overwhelming, but I was so excited."

Cat is Erin Rogers's (Adrienne Pickering) daughter. She was taken into care when her mother became addicted to drugs. Erin tells Sonya Mitchell (Eve Morey) that Cat does not want to see her, and they only communicate through Facebook. Sonya's husband, Toadfish Rebecchi (Ryan Moloney), sets up a meeting between Cat and Erin, but Cat pulls out at the last minute as she is too nervous. Cat asks for another meeting and turns up early. She bonds with Toadie over BMX bikes and talks with her mother. Cat leaves abruptly when she learns that Erin came to see her cricket matches, but did not speak with her. Erin writes Cat a letter and she returns to see Erin. They bond while playing cricket and when Erin asks Cat to stay a few days, she agrees. However, when Cat turns up she learns Erin has gone. Toadie and Sonya allow Cat to spend the night with them. Cat later asks Sonya and Toadie if she can live with them, as she does not want to stay with her foster parents, who she feels do not want her as they are expecting a baby. Sonya invites Cat's foster mother, Lorraine (Michelle Celebicanin), over to talk. Lorraine convinces Cat that she is wanted and Cat decides to return home. Before she goes, Sonya and Toadie tell her she can visit anytime.

== Michelle Kim ==
Michelle Kim
- Neighbours character
- Portrayed by: Ra Chapman
- Duration: 2015–2016
- First appearance: 6 February 2015
- Last appearance: 27 January 2016
- Introduced by: Jason Herbison
In-universe information
- Occupation: Supervisor at Dimato Industries
- Sisters: 1

Michelle Kim, played by Ra Chapman, made her first screen appearance on 6 February 2015. Chapman finished filming with Neighbours during the week beginning 18 April 2015. Michelle is an associate of "dodgy" businessman Dennis Dimato (David Serafin). Chapman compared Michelle to her role as Kim in prison drama Wentworth, saying she was more toned down, but just as "tough". She continued, "In Wentworth, my character takes the lead while in Neighbours, she is running an illegal car racket and is relentless in getting what she wants. Sometimes a bit scary." Chapman enjoyed playing Michelle, as she evolved to become "tougher and meaner".

When Matt Turner (Josef Brown) starts a new job as a security guard at Dimato Industries, he meets with Michelle, who tells him his duties. Michelle tries to befriend Matt and offers him a dress from surplus stock for his wife. She later calls her boss, Dennis Dimato, to tell him that getting Matt onside will not be hard. Matt quits his job after learning he is working for Dimato, but soon meets with Michelle to ask for it back as he needs the money. He later asks her for extra shifts. Michelle meets Tyler Brennan (Travis Burns) and gives him the details about his new job stripping stolen cars for parts. Michelle later congratulates Tyler for stealing items on a list given to him by Dimato, and she asks him to continue working for them. She exploits his strained relationship with his brother Mark (Scott McGregor) and convinces him to steal cars. When Tyler takes a car that is tracked by the police, Dimato is arrested. When he gets out on bail, he and Michelle buy Fitzgerald Motors to use as a cover for their business. Dimato flees the country and leaves Michelle in charge.

When Bailey Turner (Calen Mackenzie) takes one of the stolen cars, Michelle demands that Tyler steals a replacement or give her $8,000. After learning Paige Smith (Olympia Valance) reported the stolen car to the police, Michelle blackmails her into helping Tyler. He tries to persuade her to leave Paige out of it, but Michelle makes her the new garage assistant. A few days later, Michelle tells Paige that they have drop off some car parts. However, the police, having been tipped off, arrive and Michelle and Paige try to escape. Michelle trips and sprains her ankle, but Paige helps her. At the hospital, Michelle claims she tripped running for the bus. She accepts Paige's plan to run the garage as a legit business. Dimato later returns to town and reunites with Michelle and their group. Tyler tries to run and Michelle suspects he is spying for the police. When the police eventually arrive, Michelle tries to escape, but Paige trips her up with a dustbin and she is arrested.

A few months later, Michelle is released and she asks Mark for help as Dimato is out for revenge against her, Tyler and Paige. Michelle later turns up at Number 24 and tells Paige that she does not feel safe at the caravan park, where the police have hidden her. They bond over family problems and stay in touch via text messages. Michelle asks Paige to meet her, which results in Paige being knocked out and put in a car boot. Michelle later turns up at Paige's house, claiming that Dimato found her and attacked her. Paige lets her stay the night and tries to help, unaware that Michelle is using make-up to fake her bruises, so she can trick Paige into thinking Dimato is after her, as part of a plan to set Paige up for burglary. Dimato later punches Michelle for real during an argument, but despite this she continues with the plan. After renting an apartment in her name for Michelle, Paige discovers the truth when she finds a large number of stolen items in the apartment, and Michelle tips off the police. Paige manages to remove the items before the police arrive, while Paul Robinson (Stefan Dennis) blackmails Dimato into leaving town, after which Michelle also abandons Erinsborough.

== Tyler Brennan ==
Tyler Brennan, played by Travis Burns, made his first screen appearance on 6 February 2015. The character and casting was announced on 3 November 2014. Burns was asked to audition for the part while he was in the United States earlier in the year. Of his casting, he said "When you score a role on a show as iconic as Neighbours, you don't say no. It's especially cool to be joining the show in its 30th-anniversary year. I feel like I've arrived at the perfect time." Tyler is the younger brother of established character Mark Brennan (Scott McGregor). Burns felt an instant connection with McGregor, as they had previously met a few times through their modelling agency, which he felt helped him secure the role. Tyler is a mechanic and was billed as a "badboy-with-a-heart". Melissa Field from TV Week Soap Extra also called him "troublesome" and a "ladies' man".

== Nick Petrides ==
Nick Petrides
- Neighbours character
- Portrayed by: Damien Fotiou
- Duration: 2015, 2017
- First appearance: 19 February 2015
- Last appearance: 8 September 2017
- Introduced by: Jason Herbison
In-universe information
- Occupation: Oncologist
- Mother: Estelle Petrides
- Sisters: Terese Willis
- Nephews: Josh Willis
- Nieces: Imogen Willis; Piper Willis

Nick Petrides, played by Damien Fotiou, made his first screen appearance on 19 February 2015. The character and casting was revealed on 20 November 2014, when Fotiou was seen in a behind the scenes video released by Neighbours on their YouTube channel. Nick is Terese Willis' (Rebekah Elmaloglou) brother, who comes to Erinsborough to visit his family. Fotiou said Nick is an oncologist, but he reassured fans that he was not being introduced as part of any health storylines. The actor explained, "It's all about just coming home I think. He just wants to come home." Nick befriended Georgia Brooks (Saskia Hampele), causing her husband, Kyle Canning (Chris Milligan), to dislike him. Fotiou later described Nick: "He is a very interesting character. His intentions are certainly noble, however all is not what it appears and I love the way the story unfolds – there's a lot of surprises." Fotiou had to undergo a small makeover for the part, which involved having his curly hair slicked back to create "a more conservative appearance."

An Inside Soap columnist thought Nick's fake-cancer plot was "dastardly" and added, "we didn't think there were many people around who are more wicked than Paul Robinson – but it seems he's well and truly met his match in Doctor Nick." Louise Rugendyke of The Sydney Morning Herald observed that Nick "seems to be as competent as Dr. Nick on The Simpsons". Daniel Kilkelly of Digital Spy branded Nick "one of the show's most twisted villains". Fotiou reprised his role in 2017 when Nick was reintroduced for Terese's breast cancer storyline. He returned on 31 July.

Nick comes to Erinsborough for an interview at the local hospital with Karl Kennedy (Alan Fletcher). While he is at The Waterhole, Karl introduces Nick to nurse Georgia Brooks. She attempts to tell him about working at the hospital, but he cuts her off as he is trying to send an email. Nick catches up with his sister, Terese, and stays for lunch with her family. Terese's husband, Brad (Kip Gamblin) is uneasy about Nick's arrival and later tells Terese that Nick engineered a meeting between Brad, his former wife and son before their wedding. Terese confronts Nick, who admits that he wanted to see if Brad was faithful to her. Nick befriends Paul Robinson (Stefan Dennis) and decides to accept the job at the hospital. During a function at Paul's penthouse, Chris Pappas (James Mason) chokes on some food and Georgia saves his life. When Nick questions Georgia as to why she did call for his help, she calls him arrogant. Nick makes a bet with Paul that he can have sex with Georgia, even though she is married. Nick gets closer to Georgia when he asks for her help with fundraising ideas. He gives her tickets to the ballet as a gesture of thanks and accompanies her when her husband is busy with work. Nick later asks Georgia to a conference in Hobart, but Georgia overhears him talking about the bet with Paul. He tries to pass it off as a joke, but Georgia pours her drink over him, causing Nick's stutter to return. Paul angers Nick when he informs him that his application for a cancer research centre has been denied. Nick doctors Paul's blood test results and tells Paul that he has leukaemia. Nick begins Paul on a course of chemotherapy.

Paul tells Nick that he is willing to back his plans for the treatment centre, after the sale of the site does not go through. Nick tries apologising to Georgia again, but she makes a complaint against him. She is suspended from work after she accuses Nick of framing her by hacking into her social media page to reveal a patient's details. When Nick learns the decision about the research centre has been delayed, he tells Paul that his body has stopped responding to the chemotherapy. Paul later informs Nick that the cancer centre has the go-ahead. Nick finds Georgia in his hotel room and believes she has been going through his computer. She is arrested and later fired from the hospital. Paul collapses at The Waterhole and Nick is prevented from treating him in private. Georgia confronts Nick and claims that he has faked Paul's illness. Georgia takes the evidence to Mark Brennan (Scott McGregor), who questions both Nick and Paul. Nick is suspended when IT find out that he deleted Paul's patient files. He confesses what he did to Terese, claiming his motivation was to find a cure for cancer. He then attempts to flee Erinsborough, but Brad calls the police and Nick is arrested. Paul asks to see him and tells him that the research centre will be shut down and he will see to it that Nick loses his medical license. At the station, Nick belittles his family, before he is led away.

Two years later, Terese's fiancé Gary Canning (Damien Richardson) visits Nick in prison. He tells Nick that Terese has been diagnosed with breast cancer and that her current treatment is not working, before asking him for his help. Terese also visits Nick and he recommends immunotherapy, but tells her he has to get out of prison in order to help. Terese agrees to talk at his parole hearing, while Clive Gibbons (Geoff Paine), the hospital's COO writes a letter of recommendation. Paul also comes to see Nick to let him know that he will do everything he can to stop his release. However, Nick is paroled under the condition that does not practice medicine, but he can continue his research and oversee Terese's treatment. Nick is reacquainted with his niece Piper Willis (Mavournee Hazel), while David Tanaka (Takaya Honda) is assigned to oversee Nick's work. While attending church, Nick helps Amy Williams (Zoe Cramond) when she sprains her ankle. Nick soon learns Amy is Paul's daughter and attempts to speak to her, but Leo Tanaka (Tim Kano) tells him to stay away. The West Waratah Star publishes an article about Nick's employment at the hospital and the hospital board threatens to reverse the decision to let Nick consult on Terese's treatment. A further article painting Nick in a more favourable light is later published.

Gary overhears Nick on the phone admitting to keeping something from Terese, before putting a file in his briefcase. Amy invites Nick to the penthouse for a drink. He later realises she has taken his file. Amy refuses to hand it over until he tells her the truth. Nick says he wants to help Terese and attempts to take the file from Amy, who hits him with a vase. Amy learns that Nick wants to open a wellness centre for cancer patients, and she apologises to him. They later spend the night together, and she comforts him when a young patient dies. Stephanie Scully (Carla Bonner) offers up Robinsons Motel as the location for the wellness centre. Paul tries to write Nick a cheque for any amount, as long as Nick leaves town and opens his wellness centre in Perth, but Nick refuses the money. As Nick is spending time with Amy and Terese, Mark Brennan comes to search his room after receiving a tip off that Nick has taken cancer drugs from the hospital. Mark finds the drugs and Nick accuses Paul of planting them. A patient comes to Nick's hotel room claiming that Nick texted her to pick up the drugs. Mark finds the sent text on Nick's phone and takes him to the station, where his parole is revoked. Paul reveals he planted the drugs, but Nick is kept in prison after he assaults a guard. Paul's actions push Amy away from him. Consequently, Paul pays a top barrister a few months later to represent Nick in court. Terese is told off screen by Nick that he plans on heading back to Darwin to see family.

== Jimmy Williams ==
Jimmy Williams
- Neighbours character
- Portrayed by: Darcy Tadich
- Duration: 2015–2020, 2025
- First appearance: 10 June 2015
- Last appearance: 11 December 2025
- Introduced by: Jason Herbison
In-universe information
- Occupation: Student
- Family: Robinson
- Father: Liam Barnett
- Mother: Amy Williams
- Grandfathers: Paul Robinson
- Grandmothers: Nina Williams
- Uncles: Leo Tanaka; David Tanaka
- First cousins: Harlow Robinson
- Other relatives: Daniel Robinson; Hilary Robinson; Madison Robinson; Lucy Robinson

Jimmy Williams, played by Darcy Tadich, made his first screen appearance on 10 June 2015. The character and Tadich's casting details were announced on 17 May 2015. The role marks Tadich's television acting debut. Tadich found the audition process "nerve wracking", but he decided to use his nervous energy during his performance. He found out he won the role of Jimmy after only one audition. Jimmy is the young son of returning character Amy Williams (Zoe Cramond) and the first grandchild of established regular Paul Robinson (Stefan Dennis). Paul is unaware of Jimmy's existence due to his estrangement from Amy, but is "overjoyed" to learn that he has a grandson. Jimmy and Paul get along well, but Amy is aware of how "impressionable" Jimmy is and becomes concerned that Paul might overindulge him. Tadich called Jimmy a "happy-go-lucky" kid, who is into video games. Tadich departed the show on 25 May 2018, as Jimmy leaves for New York City with his father. He reprised the role the following year, and returned on 22 May 2019. Tadich later reprised the role for Cramond's exit, which aired on 1 January 2020.. In November 2025, it was reported that Tadich would briefly return as Jimmy the following month for the soap's final episodes.

After Amy's cousin Daniel Robinson (Tim Phillipps) asks her to return to Erinsborough to reconnect with Paul, she agrees for Jimmy's sake. Jimmy meets his grandfather for the first time and enjoys his stories of an old well nearby. He later disappears from Sonya Rebecchi's (Eve Morey) garden and Amy suspects he has gone down the well. However, Jimmy goes to The Waterhole looking for Paul and he bonds with Naomi Canning (Morgana O'Reilly), Paul's assistant. Amy allows Paul to look after Jimmy while she is working for Kyle Canning (Chris Milligan). Paul connects with Jimmy and buys him expensive presents, which Amy later returns to him, having previously mentioned that Jimmy could not have them until Christmas. When Jimmy struggles with his science project, he calls Paul for help. Amy returns home to find them working together and is impressed that Paul did not need to spend money on Jimmy to help them bond. Jimmy finds a bag of letters that contain the secrets of the residents of Ramsay Street. He reads a couple and blackmails Karl Kennedy (Alan Fletcher) into giving him a cake. He later tries the same thing with Karl's wife Susan (Jackie Woodburne), but she marches him home to Sonya, who then tells Amy. Jimmy is reprimanded, but when he finds Sheila Canning's (Colette Mann) secret, he blackmails her into giving him crisps and cake. When Sheila cannot cope with the pressure, she shakes Jimmy. His cries attract Amy's attention and Sheila admits that he has been blackmailing her. Jimmy and Sheila later apologise to each other.

Jimmy befriends Kyle and spends a lot of his time at the Dial-a-Kyle builders yard. Amy and Kyle develop feelings for each other, but their potential romance is halted when Jimmy's father Liam Barnett (James Beck) visits. Jimmy and Liam spend time together. Amy allows Jimmy to walk to a Dial-a-Kyle, but he goes missing. Stephanie Scully (Carla Bonner) finds him hiding out at the high school and he is reunited with Amy. He later witnesses his father accepting a bribe from Paul never to contact him or Amy again, after which Jimmy becomes distant from Paul. Amy and Jimmy move in with Kyle and Sheila. Jimmy initially dislikes Kyle taking the place of Liam, until he is told of his father's crimes. Jimmy befriends Steph's son Charlie Hoyland (Alexander McGuire) when he comes to stay. When Paul goes on the run, after being accused of causing an explosion at Lassiter's Hotel, Jimmy finds him and warns him that the police are on their way. Jimmy follows Paul into the bush and is stung by a bee, which causes him to suffer an allergic reaction. Paul takes him to Erinsborough Hospital and is arrested. Jimmy struggles with Paul's imprisonment. He challenges Charlie to a series of dares. When Steph has to work, Mark Brennan (Scott McGregor) takes the boys on a tour around the Erinsborough Police Station. Jimmy steals some pepper spray and sprays the can at Charlie as part of a dare. Charlie requires medical treatment at the hospital. When Amy confronts him, Jimmy admits that he is just trying to have fun, as he has been abandoned by his father, grandfather and Kyle, who left to reunite with his wife. While Jimmy and Charlie are playing with a drone, they lose control of it and Jimmy gets on his bike to catch up to it. He is struck by a car and the driver leaves the scene. Jimmy is rushed to the hospital, where he has to undergo surgery to remove a ruptured spleen. Kyle returns for a visit and Amy decides to move out, causing Jimmy to blame Kyle for not being able to live at Number 26 anymore. Sheila convinces them to stay, but months later Amy and Jimmy move in with Paul at the Lassiter's penthouse.

Jimmy crashes his drone and believes that he caused Steph to crash her bike, but when he reports it to the police, he is informed that a broken muffler caused Steph's accident. After Jimmy has a check-up at the hospital, he and Amy meet Nick Petrides (Damien Fotiou), who asks Jimmy if he would play chess with a patient of his. Jimmy initially refuses, as he dislikes Nick due to history with Paul, but later changes his mind and bonds with Nick. While riding his bike through the Lassiter's complex, Jimmy realises he is going to hit Kirsha Rebecchi (Vani Dhir) and shouts at her to get out of the way, but as she cannot hear, her father Shane Rebecchi (Nicholas Coghlan) pushes her aside and Jimmy hits him with his bike instead, resulting in Shane injuring his hand. Jimmy decides to buy Kirsha a smart watch so she can access her talk to text app more easily, but he has no money. Tia Martinez (Erica Brown) suggests that he steals alcohol from the hotel rooms, as her brother would buy it. Jimmy later takes several bottles from Xanthe Canning's (Lilly Van der Meer) housekeeping cart and sells them to Gus Martinez (Blake Draper). Tia later plants some of the alcohol bottles in Xanthe's school bag out of revenge. After Xanthe is suspended from school and the hotel, Jimmy admits that he stole the bottles. Jimmy develops a crush on Poppy Ryan (Eloise Ross), but struggles to talk to her, so Kirsha helps him to ask Poppy out on a date. Jimmy and Poppy soon begin dating. Jimmy's father Liam returns to Erinsborough and attempts to repair his relationship with his son. Jimmy decides to walk home from school when he feels ill, but due to his weakened immune system, he collapses. Liam finds him and rushes him to the hospital, where he recovers. Kirsha tells Jimmy that Poppy has been bullying her, so he asks Poppy to stop and then breaks up with her. Jimmy learns that Liam is leaving town again and he believes it may be his fault. Amy eventually tells him that Liam has a job offer in New York City and wanted Jimmy to go with him, but she asked him to leave instead. Jimmy assures his mother that he would never have left with Liam, but he later tells Kirsha that it would be cool to go to New York. Paul later asks Jimmy whether he wants to go and Jimmy tells him that he does, as it is only for six months. Amy gives Jimmy her blessing to go, and Paul accompanies Jimmy and Liam to New York to help him settle in.

The following year, Amy's partner Gary Canning (Damien Richardson) flies Jimmy over to Erinsborough for her birthday party, and their surprise wedding. After Amy refuses to marry Gary at the party, she and Jimmy go away for a few days. On their return, Paul tries to convince Jimmy that Amy was happier with Kyle, but he says it is Amy's decision. Jimmy has dinner with Paul, Terese Willis (Rebekah Elmaloglou), Gary and Amy before he leaves for the airport. Months later, Amy learns that Jimmy has been going through a difficult teenage phase. Jimmy returns to Erinsborough, after Liam informs Leo that he is missing. Amy tries talking with him and Jimmy explains that he and Liam have been arguing for a few months. Amy also learns from Liam that Jimmy has been spending time with some friends that Liam disapproves of, so she confronts him about his behaviour. Jimmy later steals some money from Amy's purse. Amy discovers Jimmy has brought his girlfriend to Australia with him, and is hiding her from her abusive father. Jimmy begs Amy to move to New York with him as he misses her support. With her reconciliation with Kyle already on the rocks, Amy decides to break off their relationship and leave Erinsborough with Jimmy and Leo.

== Aaron Brennan ==
Aaron Brennan, played by Matt Wilson, made his first screen appearance on 16 June 2015. The character and casting was announced on 17 May 2015. Wilson relocated from Sydney to Melbourne for filming. Aaron is the third member of the Brennan family to be introduced, after his older and younger brothers Mark (Scott McGregor) and Tyler Brennan (Travis Burns). Wilson said Aaron was "a very confident young guy", who likes to make people happy and is unfazed by many things. Aaron made "a memorable entrance" as a male stripper, before he tried to reconnect with his brothers. Aaron is also gay and Matt Bamford from The Daily Telegraph reported that he could be a love interest for Nate Kinski (Meyne Wyatt). Anthony D. Langford from TheBacklot.com was surprised that one of the Brennan brothers was gay and hoped Wilson had been cast for more than his looks.

== Mary Smith ==
Mary Smith
- Neighbours character
- Portrayed by: Gina Liano
- Duration: 2015–2016
- First appearance: 30 June 2015
- Last appearance: 11 February 2016
- Introduced by: Jason Herbison
In-universe information
- Occupation: Events manager
- Husband: John Smith (divorced)
- Sons: Ethan Smith
- Adoptive daughters: Paige Smith
- Grandsons: Gabriel Smith (adoptive)

Mary Smith, played by Gina Liano, made first screen appearance on 30 June 2015. Liano's casting was announced on 6 April 2015 and the role marks her acting debut. Luke Dennehy of the Herald Sun reported that the casting directors hired Liano after she impressed them with a screen test. Liano began filming with the show on 14 April. Of her casting, Liano said "I'm thrilled, I think it will be a lot of fun. It's a new experience, I love a challenge and I'm really looking forward to working with Olympia and the rest of the crew down there on the Neighbours set." Mary is Paige Smith's (Olympia Valance) adoptive mother. Valance believed Liano was the ideal person to play Mary, commenting "She's exactly what I imagine Paige's mum would be." Liano's look and style was not changed for the part and she said that it was one of the reasons she was chosen to play Mary. Mary returned in February 2016. While reviewing Paige's wedding, Clare Rigden of the Herald Sun commented "the wackiest and most awesome thing is the return of Gina Liano, who plays Paige's mum. She's back to offer a pink bespangled shoulder to cry on."

Mary comes to Erinsborough for her adopted daughter Paige's 21st birthday. She also meets Paige's biological parents Lauren (Kate Kendall) and Brad (Kip Gamblin). Mary apologises to Paige for turning up unannounced and reveals that her son Ethan (Matt Little) has been keeping her up to date with Paige's business. Terese Willis (Rebekah Elmaloglou) later visits Mary and learns that she wants Paige to come to Singapore with her. During a meeting, Paige tells Mary that she once overheard her say the minute she arrived was the minute everything went wrong. Mary does not deny saying it, but explains that she had learned that Paige had been stolen and that her husband had lied to her, which eventually ruined their marriage. Lauren asks Mary to stay longer to show Paige that she cares. Terese encourages Mary to use Lassiter's Hotel for a business event. Mary asks that Naomi Canning (Morgana O'Reilly) is not involved due to her prior connection with a client. Mary and Paige bond over a crafting event at Off Air, and Paige accepts Mary's invitation to Singapore. She later changes her mind due to her involvement in a police investigation. Before she leaves, Mary tells Paige that she is proud of her. She also mentions that Terese seemed pretty keen for Paige to go to Singapore. Mary tells Paige she cannot come to her wedding to Mark Brennan (Scott McGregor), but sends her a glamorous wedding dress as a present. As a surprise, Mary does arrive, but finds the wedding called off as Mark arrested Paige at the ceremony. Mary comforts her daughter and tries to convince Mark to talk to Paige, but he refuses. Seeing how upset she is, Mary then convinces Paige to come back to Singapore with her.

== Russell Brennan ==
Russell Brennan
- Neighbours character
- Portrayed by: Russell Kiefel
- First appearance: 29 July 2015
- Last appearance: 9 September 2015
- Introduced by: Jason Herbison
In-universe information
- Occupation: Mechanic
- Wife: Fay Brennan (divorced)
- Sons: Mark Brennan; Aaron Brennan
- Daughters: Chloe Brennan
- Adoptive sons: Tyler Brennan

Russell Brennan, played by Russell Kiefel, made his first screen appearance on 29 July 2015. The character and casting was announced on 29 June 2015. Russell is the father of Mark (Scott McGregor), Tyler (Travis Burns) and Aaron Brennan (Matt Wilson). The family will be at the centre of "a controversial" domestic violence storyline. Russell abused his sons and later became estranged from them, so they are wary when he tries to convince them he has changed. Of the character, Kiefel said "He has a lot of ground to make up with his boys and the challenge is to convince them that he is a changed man... but is he?" Claire Crick of All About Soap observed, "while he might not be as easy on the eye as his hunky sons, he's certainly set to cause a stir in his new neighbourhood!" Producers planned for Kiefel to reprise his role as part of a major storyline for the Brennan family, but it had to be rewritten following his death in November 2016. The Brennan brothers' mother Fay (Zoe Bertram) was introduced instead.

After his eldest son Mark contacts him to catch-up, Russell comes to Ramsay Street to see his sons. He remarks to Aaron that it is the first time in a while that they have all been together. Aaron makes a quick exit, while Tyler tries to avoid his father. Russell meets Mark's girlfriend Paige Smith (Olympia Valance) and Sheila Canning (Colette Mann), who he later flirts with. Russell learns Aaron is an exotic dancer and admits to Nate Kinski (Meyne Wyatt) that he finds it hard to relate to his son. At home, Russell tries talking to Aaron about his job and Aaron asks if he wants to watch the football with him. Russell continues to bond with his sons and they arrange a barbecue, which Russell invites Tyler to. He apologises for beating him when he was younger.

Russell and Sheila begin dating. She offers to help him buy Fitzgerald Motors, as he is unable to get a quick sale for his current garage in Port Lincoln. However, Mark finds out the money was illegally obtained by Sheila's son, Gary Canning (Damien Richardson), so she hands it into the police instead. Mark and Aaron offer to help buy the garage with their savings. Tyler and Russell spend the day with Ben Kirk (Felix Mallard), who they play practical jokes on. Russell loses his temper when Ben pulls down his shorts and Karl Kennedy (Alan Fletcher) stops him from hitting Ben. Tyler is reminded of the past and begins acting up again. Russell challenges him on his behaviour and nearly hits him, but Tyler retaliates by punching him. When Mark finds out, he confronts Tyler, who reveals Russell's years of abuse. Russell confirms this to Mark and Aaron and they tell him to leave. He asks Sheila to come with him, but she refuses, telling him he needs to get help. They say goodbye, as his three sons look on.

Two years later, Russell suffers a massive heart attack and asks his former wife Fay Brennan (Zoe Bertram) to visit him. Shortly before his sons and Sheila are due to fly up to see him, Russell dies. It later becomes apparent that Hamish Roche (Sean Taylor) is Tyler's biological father rather than Russell, who was murdered by Hamish and his girlfriend, nurse Louise McLeod (Maria Theodorakis).

== Courtney Grixti ==
Courtney Grixti
- Neighbours character
- Portrayed by: Emma Lane
- Duration: 2015–2017
- First appearance: 4 August 2015
- Last appearance: 27 November 2017
- Introduced by: Jason Herbison
- Spin-off appearances: Mrs Robinson (2017)
In-universe information
- Occupation: Barmaid; University student; Lassiter's Spa manager; Rejuvenation consultant
- Father: Tim Collins
- First cousins: Jude

Courtney Grixti, played by Emma Lane, made her first screen appearance on 4 August 2015. Lane is in a relationship with Travis Burns, who plays Tyler Brennan, and commented "I was over the moon when I got the news but I think Travis was more excited than me. He is a very supportive boy." Lane admitted to being nervous about portraying a romance with Harley Bonner on-screen, as they are friends in real life. Following her initial guest stint, Burns posted photos on his social media accounts showing Lane had returned to filming. She made her on-screen return on 4 February 2016.

Courtney is a barmaid at The Waterhole who attends a staff meeting. She questions the cost of soft drinks when Terese Willis (Rebekah Elmaloglou) implements a new food and drinks policy for the staff, and then makes a comment about Terese's managerial privilege behind her back. Courtney meets Terese's son Josh (Bonner) and they have sex. He makes it clear that he wants to see her again, and they decide to go camping together. At the camp site, Courtney meets Josh's sisters Imogen Willis (Ariel Kaplan) and Paige Smith (Olympia Valance), and his pregnant ex-girlfriend Amber Turner (Jenna Rosenow). Courtney uses her body language reading skills to work out whether Aaron Brennan (Matt Wilson) is interested in her boss Nate Kinski (Meyne Wyatt), and she bonds with Amber. When Josh reveals that he has moved out of his house, he asks Courtney if he can stay with her, but she turns him down and then breaks up with him. Courtney begins dating Tyler Brennan (Travis Burns), causing Piper Willis (Mavournee Hazel) to become jealous of her. Piper later films Courtney arguing and then hugging the much older mayoral candidate, Tim Collins (Ben Anderson), thinking that they are having an affair. She publishes the film to smear Tim, but soon learns that Courtney is in fact Tim's daughter. Courtney is initially outraged by Piper's actions, but after Piper reveals that Tim intends to sue her, and that she is in love with Tyler, Courtney ultimately defuses the situation, convincing her father to drop the lawsuit.

Disgusted when Tim tries to publicly humiliate Sonya, Courtney vandalises his car. She moves in with Tyler to get away from her father, but he becomes tired of her trying to run his life, and they break up. Courtney supports Paige after her relationship with Tyler's brother ends. They go out to a club together to show that they are moving on, and Courtney sets Paige up on a date with their older university lecturer, Noel Creighton (Kristian Beddow). Months later, Courtney and Paige are at The Waterhole when Tyler walks in. Courtney decides that she wants to get back together with him and convinces Paige to host a house party. Courtney flirts with Tyler at the party, but he is not interested and she leaves with Elly Conway (Jodi Anasta). Months later, Courtney comes to Paige's birthday party, and reveals that she has quit university. Terese gives Courtney a job at Lassiter's Hotel spa. Courtney receives large tips from male clients and sends Xanthe away during sessions. Sheila suspects that Courtney is illegally administering botox, so Karl Kennedy (Alan Fletcher) confronts her. Courtney tells him that she has designed a tailored service for some of her male clients and she offers them privacy while it happens. She treats Karl and he makes return visits, along with Shane Rebecchi (Nicholas Coghlan), leading to further suspicion from their wives Susan (Jackie Woodburne) and Dipi (Sharon Johal). Terese later investigates Courtney and accuses her of giving the male clients a happy ending, which is broadcast to those inside The Waterhole by a microphone Courtney is wearing. Terese fires Courtney, but soon learns that she was using her psychology skills to offer massages and emotional therapy, which often made the male clients cry. Terese apologises and attempts to offer Courtney her job back, but Courtney quits. Susan and Dipi also offer their apologies. Courtney soon realises that Tim believed the rumours too. She decides to leave the country for a while, and later sues Terese for $5 million. A few weeks later, Courtney returns to Erinsborough engaged to Paul Robinson (Stefan Dennis).

Paul convinces Courtney to drop the lawsuit against Terese, as he is now the biggest investor in the hotel, which means Terese has to answer to him and Courtney, who Paul hires as a Rejuvenation Consultant. Paul and Courtney inform his children of their engagement and Amy Williams (Zoe Cramond) suspects Courtney is after Paul's money. Tim tries to get Courtney to come home, but she refuses. Paul's son Leo Tanaka (Tim Kano) helps Courtney give a speech to the judges of the Most Liveable Suburb Competition. After thanking him for his help, she tells him he is welcome to stay the night. Courtney apologises, telling him that she is naturally flirty, but she is committed to Paul. Leo later attempts to kiss Courtney, but she pushes him away. She decides not to tell Paul, as she does not want to hurt him. Paul soon admits that he and Courtney are not in a relationship, and that they just wanted to get revenge on Terese and Tim. Courtney hosts a silent disco at The Waterhole, but it does not attract much attention. Paul saves the event by turning it into a tea dance for his cousin Hilary Robinson (Anne Scott-Pendlebury) and her friends. After dancing together, Courtney tells Paul that they should make their relationship real, but Paul is hesitant. He later suggests to Courtney that they elope. Tim accosts Courtney outside Lassiter's, where she tells him that she and Paul are married. She then tells Amy, Leo and their friends. However, it emerges that they did not go through with the ceremony. Courtney begins packing up her belongings to move out of the penthouse, but she remarks that she has nowhere to go. Paul tells Tim the truth and brings him back to the penthouse to speak with Courtney. Tim tells her that he cares for her and apologises for pushing her too hard. He asks her to return home and she agrees. Courtney gives Paul her resignation from Lassiter's and he tells her to keep the engagement and wedding rings.

== Piper Willis ==
Piper Willis, played by Mavournee Hazel, made her first screen appearance on 16 September 2015. The character has often been mentioned since the arrival of her on-screen family in May 2013, while Hazel's casting was announced on 18 August 2015. The actress relocated to Melbourne for filming and commented "It's a great feeling to be rewarded with the role of Piper after years of hard work, especially when I fell in love with the character after my first audition." Ahead of her first appearance, the character was featured in a series of webisodes titled Hey Piper, which see her talking to her family via online video calls. Piper is the youngest daughter of Brad (Kip Gamblin) and Terese Willis (Rebekah Elmaloglou). She has been away studying in Canada. Hazel stated that she and the producers had a similar idea of how they wanted the character to be, and she was billed as being "feisty" and "quirky".

== Shay Daeng ==
Shay Daeng
- Neighbours character
- Portrayed by: Yasmin Kassim
- Duration: 2015–2016, 2021
- First appearance: 29 October 2015
- Last appearance: 12 August 2021
- Introduced by: Jason Herbison
In-universe information
- Other names: Shay Quill
- Occupation: Assistant hotel manager
- Stepmother: Julie Quill
- Brothers: Tom Quill; Jesse Porter (step)
- Half-brothers: Archie Quill

Shay Daeng (also Quill), played by Yasmin Kassim, made her first screen appearance on 29 October 2015. The character and Kassim's casting was announced on 25 October 2015. Kassim told Jonathon Moran of The Daily Telegraph that she filmed her guest stint over "a couple of months" in Melbourne. She described her character as being "really cool" and explained that Shay comes to Erinsborough to work at Lassiter's Hotel. Kassim added that Shay would endure drama in her personal and work lives and would have secrets. Kassim reprised the role in 2021.

Shay connects with Kyle Canning (Chris Milligan) on a dating app and they meet for a drink at The Waterhole. Kyle later invites Shay back to his house. Kyle later introduces Shay to his grandmother Sheila Canning (Colette Mann) and his colleague Amy Williams (Zoe Cramond). Shay reveals that she has been brought in as the assistant manager of Lassiter's Hotel, while Terese Willis (Rebekah Elmaloglou) recovers from injuries sustained in a fire. Terese later praises Shay for her work at Lassiter's and questions where she has seen Shay before. Shay confronts Kyle about breaking up with her via text message, and she threatens him and Amy. She later looks at a photo of herself as a young girl with Terese in Perth. Terese asks Shay about her CV, causing Shay to call someone to let them know Terese is suspicious of her. After entering Terese's home, Shay photos the Lassiter's staff personnel files. Terese catches her and demands to look in her bag to check she did not take anything. She then sees the photo of herself and Shay. Terese later realises that she met Shay at a Lassiter's conference with her step-mother, Julie Quill (Gail Easdale), fifteen years ago. Shay reveals that she has been spying for the Quill Group and they now own Lassiter's. She then asks Paul Robinson (Stefan Dennis) to vacate the premises immediately. Shay oversees the restructuring of the hotel and keeps Terese on as manager. She gets her revenge on Kyle by cancelling his contract with Lassiter's and bad-mouthing his business. Amy smears manure on Shay in retaliation. Shay then leaves for Dubai.

Five years later, Shay meets with Jesse Porter (Cameron Robbie), a Lassiter's employee who has been spying for the Quill Group. He gives her a report about a drive-in movie night idea that Lassiter's has had. When Shay demands information about budgets and contracts, Jesse tells her that Paul and Terese already know the Quill Group stole their film festival pitch, and they will eventually figure out that he was behind it. Shay tells Jesse that she knew what to look for when she worked for Terese, so he should not be telling her it cannot be done. She then asks if he would say that to Julie and Jesse tells her that he will work it out. It soon emerges that Jesse is Julie's son and he is trying to help Shay repair the Quill Group's damaged reputation. Shay demands Jesse finds more information and says that he is not doing enough. She tells him that the Quill Group is still suffering due to Julie's actions. Jesse argues that Paul was also a victim of Julie's crimes, but Shay says that he was not. She threatens to kick Jesse out of the business if he does not help. After discovering the truth about Jesse's connection to Julie and the Quill Group, Terese confronts Shay and tells her not to punish Jesse because of his mother's actions. Shay accuses Terese of loving the fact that the Quill Group is folding. Terese says that cutting Jesse out will ruin his life. Terese later tells Shay that she is interested in having Lassiters invest in the Quill Group to save the business. However, Terese informs Shay that the investment will have to be postponed indefinitely, as Paul has some personal matters to sort out. Shay reminds Terese that the company is close to folding and she will now be forced to source another financier who can help them out.

== Cecilia Saint ==
Cecilia Saint
- Neighbours character
- Portrayed by: Candice Alley
- Duration: 2015–2016
- First appearance: 11 November 2015
- Last appearance: 6 June 2016
- Introduced by: Jason Herbison
In-universe information
- Sons: Harrison Saint

Cecilia Saint, played by Candice Alley, made her first screen appearance on 11 November 2015. The character and Alley's casting was announced on the same day. Alley auditioned for the role and learned she had been successful a couple of days later. She commented that the cast and crew had been very welcoming towards her. Of joining the show, the singer said "With such a love for acting, I feel so fortunate to be part of such an iconic Australian series and working with such an amazing team of people." Alley filmed her first scenes in August, and returned to the set in 2016 to continue her character's storyline. Cecilia was billed as "a mysterious woman" who becomes involved in a scheme to unhinge Stephanie Scully (Carla Bonner). Alley told a New Idea reporter that she enjoyed "being able to delve into a character who's also a single mother."

Cecilia brings her car to Fitzgerald Motors for a service. She also asks Steph to replace the brake pads. Cecilia also brings her son Harrison (Zebedee Howell) along and calls him Charlie in front of Steph. When Cecilia returns, she gets angry, claiming she did not ask for new brake pads, and Steph's boss Tyler Brennan (Travis Burns) refunds her, despite Steph telling him she did. Afterwards, Cecilia calls Paul Robinson (Stefan Dennis) to tell him that she has followed his instructions and unnerved Steph. Cecilia later has Harrison call Steph to tell her that he is missing her. Months later, Paul contacts Cecilia and pays her to ruin the Citizen of the Year event at Lassiter's Hotel. After the hotel is destroyed by an explosion, Paul tries to contact Cecilia to find out if she caused it, but she ignores his calls. Following Paul's arrest, Steph confronts Cecilia about Paul's instructions. Cecilia tells her that she had to take her son to the hospital at the time of the explosion. When Steph asks her to go to the police, Cecilia refuses and says she will deny any involvement if anyone asks. Cecilia turns up at Terese Willis's (Rebekah Elmaloglou) house looking for her daughter Piper (Mavournee Hazel), who uploaded an interview with Paul in which Cecilia was mentioned. Terese asks Cecilia if she thinks Paul is guilty and when Cecilia says that she does, Terese pays her to go to the police and implicate Paul in the explosion. Terese also offers her a job. During the trial, Cecilia gives her false testimony. But Terese feels guilty at what she has done and tells the court that she paid Cecilia to lie.

== Others ==
| Date(s) | Character | Actor | Circumstances |
|---|---|---|---|
| 9 January | Margot Bisco | Diana Joselle | Margot is a friend of Naomi Canning, who gives her a car to sell. Margot later turns up at Fitzgerald Motors to give mechanic Mark Brennan the car's service history. |
| 12 January | Errol Gill | Eyawn Harry | Errol comes to Fitzgerald Motors to look at a classic MG car, with a view to purchasing it from Naomi Canning. |
| 12 January | Timmy Fogerty | Michael Foster | Erin Rogers meets with Timmy to purchase drugs. |
| 12 January | Darren Mayer | Jamie Sheather | Darren attacks Sonya Mitchell, pushing her against a wall several times, before stealing her bag. |
| 16 January | Marco James | Khisraw Jones-Shukoor | Marco works at The Waterhole. He serves a piece of cake to his boss Paul Robinson and wishes him a happy birthday. |
| 21 January 2015–28 January 2016 | Dennis Dimato | David Serafin | Dimato is a local business owner, who asks mayor Paul Robinson if he can sponsor the upcoming Erinsborough Festival. Paul initially agrees, until he learns that Dimato has a bad reputation. Dimato later offers Naomi Canning a bribe to convince Paul to reinstate his sponsorship. Naomi gives the money back and Mark Brennan tells Dimato that he knows all about it. Dimato threatens Naomi and continues to intimidate her when she makes a statement to the police. Matt Turner takes a second job as a security guard for Dimato. When Matt learns that Dimato is stealing cars, he is forced to stay quiet when Dimato blackmails him. Dimato gives Tyler Brennan a job stripping stolen cars for parts. After Tyler steals a car with a tracking device, Dimato is arrested by Mark. After he is released, Dimato purchases the local garage and then skips bail. A few months later, Dimato returns to town and invites Tyler to a meeting with the rest of the group. Dimato picks Tyler up in his car and discards his phone. Dimato reveals his plans to start up the illegal car parts business again. Tyler tries to escape, but he is caught and Dimato orders his men to get rid of him. However, the police turn up and arrest Dimato. He is later released and hatches a plan to get revenge on Tyler and Paige Smith, with the help of Michelle, who befriends Paige, claiming Dimato assaulted her. When Michelle begins verbally abusing Dimato, sick of putting herself in unpleasant situations for the plan, he hits her. He is then attacked by Nate Kinski. After discovering Dimato is trying to set Paige up for robbery, Paul blackmails him into leaving Erinsborough. |
| 23 January | Phil Lloyd | Colin Masters | Mark Brennan talks to Phil about his boss Dennis Dimato. Phil later tells Mark that he has been fired from his job at Grease Monkeys. |
| 27 January 2015, 3 March 2016 | Andres Serna | Henry Torres | Andres is a new barman at The Waterhole. Sheila Canning hopes his good looks will bring in more customers. Andres does not understand English very well and struggles with orders. Lou Carpenter later poaches Andres for Harold's Store. The following year Andres delivers materials to Doug Willis for his carpentry. |
| 28 January–6 July | Snr Sgt Milov Frost | Hadrian Jonathan | Matt Turner asks his senior sergeant about working overtime at the station, and Frost tells him that there is none due to budget cuts. When Matt explains that he has just purchased a house, Frost suggests that he gets a second job. A few months later, Mark Brennan tells Frost that he suspects Dennis Dimato has moved his operation to a legitimate business. Frost agrees and asks Brennan to check out all the local mechanics. Brennan later asks Frost what is happening with Dimato's associate Michelle Kim. Frost tells him that they are planning to get her by using his brother Tyler Brennan in a sting operation. Brennan brings Toadfish Rebecchi to the station to talk to Tyler, but they are too late and Frost reveals that Tyler has agreed to the deal. |
| 2 February 2015, 5 February 2018 | Bill Warley | Darren Mort | Bill is Sue Parker's husband and the father of Jayden Warley. He punches Paul Robinson after seeing an old picture of Sue and Paul kissing. Three years later, Bill meets with Fay Brennan and tells her the police have contacted him about his whereabouts on the night of the fireworks. Fay asks Bill to keep quiet. When Mishti Sharma approaches them, Bill leaves suddenly. Fay later admits that she and Bill spent the night together. |
| 3 February | Lorraine Newman | Michelle Celebicanin | Lorraine comes over to Number 30 to talk with Sonya Mitchell and Toadfish Rebecchi about her foster daughter Cat's living arrangements. Lorraine convinces Cat that she is wanted and loved. Cat decides to return home with Lorraine. |
| 4 February–5 August | Joey Dimato | Steven Sammut | Joey is Dennis Dimato's nephew. Naomi Canning gives him a bill for some broken gnomes and tells him Dennis is now dealing with the entire Canning family. Joey later spots Amber Turner taking pictures of him outside Grease Monkeys and confronts her. She tells him that she was just taking pictures of the buildings and he got in the way. When Joey tries to grab the camera, Josh Willis stops and threatens him. When Sheila Canning catches Joey attempting to steal a customer's belongings, she asks Matt Turner to arrest him. Matt takes Joey away and gives him a warning, knowing he cannot arrest Joey, as he is working for Dennis. Joey and Michelle Kim notice Tyler Brennan is belittled by his brother Mark and decide to use it to their advantage. Joey takes Tyler and Nate Kinski out for a beer, while Michelle encourages Tyler to steal cars for them. Joey later tells Tyler that he will be dropping off a stolen car to the garage, and a few weeks later, he leaves a bag of money with Tyler and Paige Smith. When Dennis returns to town, he gathers his group together to let them know that he is starting up the business again. The police turn up to arrest them, but Joey manages to escape. Weeks later he turns up at Paige's house and holds her hostage, but she manages to overpower him and tie him up. The police arrive and Joey is arrested. |
| 16–17 February | Bryson Jennings | Brodie Derrick | Bryson is Paige Smith's online friend. Bryson accepts Paige's invite to meet her in Erinsborough, but he is too nervous to say hello to her. Bryson later meets Paige at Harold's Store and she is surprised to see that he does not look like his photos. Paige then accuses him of stealing money from her family and Bryson is questioned by the police, who find no evidence on his laptop. Paige finds Bryson working out in the park and is surprised that he is still in town. Bryson and Paige talk and bond over their shared interests, but when Bryson tries to kiss Paige, she pulls away. Bryson realises that she is not interested in him romantically, even though Paige asks him to stay. He tells her not to contact him again and leaves. |
| 25 February | Janice Stedler | Helen Noonan | Janice is Hilary Robinson's friend. They attend the flu clinic at the Erinsborough Community Centre together, where they complain about the waiting times. Paul Robinson later ropes Janice and Hilary into a photo for the paper. |
| 25 February | Jane Crozier | Maria Papas | Jane is a journalist who interviews Paul Robinson about the Erinsborough Festival. |
| 4 March | Baby Sebastiana | Izabella Anderson | Vanessa Villante and Lucas Fitzgerald's young daughter, who they bring to the Erinsborough Festival. |
| 19 March | Ryan Holt | Preston Taura | Ryan is a volunteer at the Erinsborough Festival. After noticing an open drain cover, he closes it, unaware Daniel Robinson and Imogen Willis are trapped below. |
| 23 March–19 May | Bouncer 2 | Uncredited | Bouncer 2 is a stray Labrador Retriever that comes over to Kyle Canning as he is working, before being caught by his grandmother Sheila. Chris Pappas tells Lucy Robinson that the dog's owner died and the council are trying to find relatives to take her in. They later learn the dog is related to Lucy's Labrador Bouncer, so Lucy names her Bouncer 2. Lucy vows to find a new owner for Bouncer 2 and later leaves the dog with Paul, who nicknames her B2. Paul grows attached to B2, even though she chews his possessions. He later lets Hilary Robinson take B2 to live with her. |
| 30 March | Janine Morgan | Helen Bongers | Janine is a minor celebrity, who is admitted to Erinsborough Hospital. When news of her stay is posted on nurse Georgia Brooks's social media page, Janine complains and Georgia is suspended. |
| 31 March | Trish Baker | Eliza D'Souza | After Georgia Brooks is suspended from Erinsborough Hospital, she approaches Trish, who works in the IT department, to ask for her help in identifying where and when her social media page could have been hacked. |
| 14 April | Samantha Turnbull | Lucy-Rose Leonard | Samantha is the head of the Law Society at Eden Hills University. She converses with Imogen Willis at a networking even in The Waterhole. Imogen tries to begin a conversation about Samantha's future job at a law firm, but Samantha is only interested in talking about her skiing holiday. |
| 21 April | Jai Roberts | Kristopher Brown | When Bailey Turner and Jayden Warley impersonate police officers, Jai is one of their victims. Bailey tells Jai to pick up some dropped litter. |
| 21 April 2015, 4 January 2016 | Stacey Harding | Vimbai Nenzou | Stacey is also one of Bailey Turner and Jayden Warley victims. They try to stop her for speeding, but she sees through their ruse. The following year, Stacey is working at Erinsborough Hospital when Sonya Rebecchi asks her to check on her husband's surgery, as fellow nurse Belinda Bell had previously made threats against him. Stacey later tries to stop Sonya from interrupting the surgery. |
| 4 May–15 June | Trevor McCann | David Bergin | Trevor is a councillor, who meets with Georgia Brooks to discuss giving Kyle Canning's handyman business a contract for a beautification project. Weeks later, Kyle brings Trevor to his yard to see his progress. Trevor is impressed with a bench Amy Williams has made and agrees that hard wood is better than the pine Kyle suggested. |
| 11–21 May | Clem Hanley | Max Whitelaw | Clem is Ezra Hanley's son. He enrols at Erinsborough High and is placed in Brad Willis's class. When Clem insults Brad's wife, Terese, Brad gives him a detention. Clem then tells Susan Kennedy that Brad picked a fight with him and he files an official complaint against Brad. Clem later receives a text from his former girlfriend Chloe and he becomes upset, leading Brad to take his phone from him. Clem rips up some trading cards given to him by Ezra and refuses to believe Terese when she tells him Ezra tried to assault her. He also tells her that Chloe made advances towards his father. He later confides in Susan that he confronted his father and he believes that he might have assaulted Chloe. Clem returns to Perth. |
| 15 May | Clara Edwards | Marie Chanel | Sonya Mitchell meets Clara for a drink at The Waterhole, after connecting with her through an app. |
| 18 May | Hannah Dunham | Kate Greer | Hannah takes her car to Fitzgerald Motors to have it washed by Tyler Brennan. She later returns and has sex with Tyler in the garage. |
| 18 May | Terence Rogers | Scott Reid | Terence also takes his car to Fitzgerald Motors to have it washed, but by Paige Smith, who becomes uncomfortable around him leering at her. |
| 21 May | Jamal Jacks | Vincent Hooper | Jamal is a paramedic who attends to Amber Turner after she collapses. He assures Amber that she and her unborn baby are okay. |
| 22 May | Chloe Jones | Gaby Seow | Chloe is Clem Hanley's ex-girlfriend. Terese Willis contacts Chloe over the internet to discuss Clem's father, Ezra. Terese tells Chloe that Ezra tried to assault her and Chloe admits that he tried to do the same thing to her. She later gives a statement to the police, resulting in Ezra's arrest. |
| 26 May–1 July | Alistair Hall | Nick Cain | Alistair plays a round of pool with Nate Kinski, who then asks him out to dinner. Alistair tells Nate to leave before he hits him and Nate realises that he is not gay. Nate later asks Alistair and his friends to keep the noise down, but Alistair insults him. Sheila Canning then intervenes, shouting at Alistair to leave. Alistair and his friends go to Off Air, on the same night Nate is having a drink with Brett Holden. Alistair spends most of the night staring at Nate, even after Kyle Canning tells him to go. Alistair later apologises to Nate for insulting him and then kisses him. He meets with Nate and tells him he was just drunk. Nate offers him some advice, but Alistair reiterates that he is not gay. Alistair threatens to report Susan Kennedy for breaching confidentiality when his fiancée, Coco Lee, finds out about the kiss. Nate tells him that he told Coco and Alistair asks him to take it back. Aaron Brennan later talks with Alistair and he agrees to drop the complaint. |
| 26 May | Rich Doyle | Jordan Rif'at | Rich joins his friend Alistair Hall at The Waterhole for a game of pool. They start to make too much noise, causing Nate Kinski to tell them to keep it down. Rich records Sheila Canning shouting at Alistair to leave. |
| 29 May–14 July 2015, 18 January 2016 | Michael Coluzzi | Bay Stefan Abbey | Michael comes to Fitzgerald Motors to pick up $50,000 from Tyler Brennan. When Tyler admits that the money is $6,000 short, he pleads with Michael to give him an extra day. Michael later returns after speaking with Michelle Kim and beats Tyler with a crowbar. Michael comes to collect the remaining money and tries to attack Nate Kinski. Nate immobilises him and when Michael wakes, Nate tells him he will pay the debt. Michael joins the rest of Dennis Dimato's group at a warehouse when Dimato returns to town. When Tyler tries to escape, Michael and the other associates manage to catch him and try to bundle him into a van on Dimato's orders. When the police show up, Michael is arrested. Dimato later asks Michael to make sure Karl Kennedy keeps quiet about Dimato's assault on Michelle and his medical treatment. Michael turns up at the Kennedy house and warns Karl's wife Susan that Karl should forget everything he has witnessed. |
| 1 June–9 July | Forrest Jones | Nicholas Gunn | Daniel Robinson shows potential buyer Forrest around the Off Air bar. Forrest plans to turn the bar in to a mixed martial arts venue. He gets talking to Josh Willis about their respective sporting careers ending due to shoulder injuries. Forrest offers Josh a job selling supplements and later tells a contact over the phone that Josh is totally clueless. Forrest later tells Josh that direct sales would provide the most income and Josh agrees to give Forrest $5000 for supplements to sell. After Josh's sister Imogen gets him fired, she appeals to Forrest to give Josh his job back and he agrees. Forrest later advises Imogen to take some self-defence classes and gives her his phone number. Josh asks Forrest for more supplements to sell and is given some illegal peptides. Imogen arranges a date with Forrest. Josh tells him that she is suspicious about the peptides and Forrest catches her with some pills. He attacks her and she hits him with a branch. Forrest fires Josh, telling him that he will report Imogen to the police if Josh does not return the rest of his supply. |
| 2 June | Craig Quill | Alec Gilbert | Craig meets with Paul Robinson to discuss the resale of Lassiter's Hotel. Paul berates Craig for hiring Ezra Hanley as the Quill Group's acquisitions manager and damaging the hotel's image. Craig later sells the hotel back to Paul. |
| 3–12 June | Brett Holden | Oliver Coleman | Brett attends an LGBTI fundraiser at The Waterhole. He asks Sheila Canning for a selfie, having seen her "Cranky Granny" persona online. He talks with Nate Kinski and they exchange numbers. Brett and Nate meet up for a drink, but when Brett thinks Nate is interested in Alistair Hall, he leaves. |
| 3 June | Sam Myers | Chris Stipic | Sam attends an LGBTI fundraiser at The Waterhole with Brett Holden. Kyle Canning keeps Sam talking, so he will not interrupt Brett and Nate Kinski. Sam eventually tells Kyle that he is not his type, and that he prefers Toadfish Rebecchi. |
| 4–15 June | Robin Dawal | Max Brown | Terese Willis hires Robin to design a new logo for Lassiter's Hotel. Robin bonds with Lauren Carpenter after learning she is a fellow artist, and he asks Terese about Lauren's relationship status. Lauren and Robin visit an art gallery and she shows him her sketches. Brad Willis tells Robin to back off as Lauren recently lost her husband. Robin later returns to work with Lauren on the logo, after she contacts him to apologise for Brad's actions. Terese rejects Robin's initial designs, but she asks him to continue working on the logo with Lauren. Robin asks Lauren out to dinner, but she turns him down. |
| 9 June | Barry Dickson | Simon Todman | Barry is a debt collector who repossesses Amy Williams's belongings. She tries to reason with Barry and begs him not to take her carpentry tools. |
| 19 June, 24 September | Conrad Leveson | Christian Poppi | Conrad purchases some dietary supplements from Josh Willis. Conrad later starts working for the same company as Josh selling illegal peptides. Paul Robinson meets with Conrad to discuss getting revenge on Josh. Conrad plants some illegal peptides in Josh's bag, leading to his arrest. |
| 22 June | Coco Lee | Sophie Cheeseman | Coco is Alistair Hall's fiancée. She wants Susan Kennedy to act as the celebrant at their wedding, but Susan refuses and tells Coco to speak to Alistair. Nate Kinski later informs Coco that Alistair kissed him. |
| 3 July | Gav Browne | Kieran McShane | Gav is working for the council when he spots Amy Williams and whistles at her. He continues to harass her, causing Paul Robinson to yell at him to stop. Amy's boss, Kyle Canning, brings over some beers for Gav and asks that he stops harassing Amy, which Gav agrees to do. |
| 14 July | Dimato Associates | Liam Titheridge; Alan Sheen | Dennis Dimato's associates are called to a meeting at a warehouse when he returns to town. He reveals his plans to start up the illegal car parts business again. When Tyler Brennan tries to escape with Dimato's phone, the associates grab him and hold him while he is searched. Dimato then orders them to put Tyler in a van, but the police arrive and manage to arrest the group. |
| 24 July–5 August | Caspar Smythe | Barton Welch | Imogen Willis meets Caspar at a French film festival and they go to The Waterhole for their first date. At the university, Imogen introduces Caspar to Daniel Robinson, who drops by. Caspar invites Daniel to his talk on sustainable living and they continue to bond, much to Imogen's annoyance. Imogen breaks up with Caspar after realising they do not have much of a romantic spark. Caspar tells Daniel about the break up and mentions that it would not have worked as Imogen liked Beyoncé. |
| 7 August | Eddie Bull | Jarrah Volpe | Eddie attends an LGBTI fundraiser at The Waterhole. He offers to buy Mark Brennan a drink, then asks Aaron Brennan and Nate Kinski for a selfie. |
| 7 August–26 November | Ashtyn Harries | Matthew Hayduk | Ashtyn is Kyle Canning's new apprentice. He accidentally turns a hose on Karl Kennedy, soaking him with water. Ashtyn continues to be incompetent at his job; knocking stock over and almost electrocuting himself. Kyle later hires Amy Williams back. A few weeks later, Ashtyn returns to Erinsborough High, having been expelled from two other schools, and he befriends Ben Kirk. He acts up during a careers lesson and drops grapes on the floor, which results in a pregnant Amber Turner slipping and injuring herself. Ashtyn taunts Piper Willis about her part in the school fire following her first day back. |
| 10 August | Balloon lady | Cassidy Anderson | The balloon lady creates balloon animals for the children at the opening of the Erinsborough Childcare Centre. |
| 13 August 2015 – 8 July 2016 | Alison Gore | Madeleine Andreopoulos | Alison auditions for Erinsborough High's interschool concert, but her rendition of "Amazing Grace" is off-key. After Ben Kirk is chosen to take part over her, Alison taunts him about his naked photos. A few months later, Alison asks Susan Kennedy why Piper Willis is allowed back at school following her part in the fire there. She also taunts Piper throughout the day, resulting in Piper threatening to burn Alison's hair. When Xanthe Canning starts at Erinsborough High, Alison demands her money back from a party Xanthe threw, but Piper tells her she cannot have a refund. When Xanthe struggles with a reading exercise, Alison makes fun of her, earning a warning from Susan. She later taunts Xanthe and Piper defends her. Susan gives all three detention. Alison tells Ben that Cooper might have been assaulted by his mother, Maureen, and not by Gary, but refuses to make a statement to police. |
| 17 August | Liv Cartledge | Liv Cartledge | Liv is an Erinsborough High student taking part in the interschool concert. She is rehearsing when a drunk Terese Willis causes a scene. |
| 26 August | Milla Poulos | Tracey O'Brien | After noticing Milla sitting by herself in The Waterhole, Aaron Brennan invites her over to meet Josh Willis. They flirt, until they are interrupted by Milla's ex-boyfriend Evan Shields. |
| 26 August | Evan Shields | Daniel Fischer | Evan notices Josh Willis flirting with his ex-girlfriend Milla Poulos and interrupts them. Aaron Brennan apologises to him, admitting that he invited Milla over to meet Josh. Evan later attacks Aaron outside, but is stopped when Nate Kinski comes to Aaron's rescue. |
| 27–28 August | Greg Keys | Ryan Faucett | While he is walking through the Lassiter's complex, Greg is briefly stopped by Aaron Brennan, who asks if he was the man who saved him from being attacked the night before. Greg later turns up in Ramsay Street to tell Kyle Canning that he is in love with Kyle's wife Georgia Brooks. He makes it clear that he and Georgia did not have an affair, but that they share a bond. |
| 17 September | Jasmine Jones | Celina Yuen | Jasmine holds her hen party at The Waterhole, with Aaron Brennan and Josh Willis performing a strip routine for her. She asks if Aaron is single on behalf of her friends, and he gives her some business cards. |
| 21 September–14 October 2015, 24 April–25 May 2018 | Liam Barnett | James Beck | Liam comes to Erinsborough to visit his son Jimmy Williams. Liam explains to Amy Williams that he is town to sell his range of organic hand sanitiser. He plays with his son and tells Amy that he wants to become a better father. Liam meets with hotel manager Terese Willis to show her the hand sanitiser. Kyle Canning accuses Liam of swapping labels on the bottles, but Liam explains that he was conducting a test. Liam, Amy and Jimmy spend time together as a family, and Liam later shares a kiss with Amy. When Amy's father Paul Robinson finds that the hand sanitiser is not organic, he cancels the deal. Liam asks Amy to change Paul's mind. Amy and Liam have sex and learn Jimmy is missing. Liam suspects Sam Mako has taken him, as he owes Sam money. Liam then admits to stealing Toadfish Rebecchi's benefit fund and trashing Harold's Café. Paul bribes Liam into leaving town and never contacting Jimmy or Amy again. Liam returns in 2018 as he pitches to sell toiletries to Lassiter's. He tells Amy that he's a changed man, pays outstanding child support and says he wants to be a good father to Jimmy. It is later revealed that Liam went on a date with Elly Conway. Liam suggests that Jimmy moves back to New York with him. Jimmy accepts and leaves with Liam. |
| 22 September | Lenny Macey | Slavko Zwirn | Lenny steals tools and bikes from Fitzgerald Motors. He later offers them for sale and Mark Brennan poses as an interested buyer. When he attempts to arrest Lenny, he runs off, but Tyler Brennan tackles him to the ground. |
| 23 September 2015, 6–7 June 2016, 18–23 April 2019 | Judge Jan Barton | Natalie Gamsu | Judge Barton meets with law student Imogen Willis for lunch. She bonds with Imogen's boyfriend Daniel Robinson over their shared love of musician Paul Kelly. Judge Barton later presides over Paul Robinson's trial for the Lassiter's Hotel explosion. After he is found guilty of two counts of manslaughter, thirty-one counts of reckless conduct endangering of lives and one count of criminal damage with a view to gain, Judge Barton sentences him to eighteen years in prison, with a non-parole period of fourteen years. Three years later, Judge Barton presides over Finn Kelly's sentencing hearing. She does not hand him a custodial sentence, believing it will not be beneficial to his rehabilitation, and she releases him into the care of the Kennedy family. |
| 30 September | Ros Michaels | Nadia Andary | Ros is a cleaning lady who comes to help out Sonya and Toadfish Rebecchi as part of a home assistance scheme. |
| 2 October | Jesse Greene | Clyde Boraine | Jesse is Naomi Canning's new assistant. He arrives in Ramsay Street in a limo to take her to the airport. |
| 7 October 2015–4 April 2018 | Wayne Baxter | Jon Bryden | Wayne is a teacher at Erinsborough High. He and Brad Willis confront Susan Kennedy about rumours the school is closing. He asks if Eden Hills Grammar is taking the teachers as well as the students, but Susan cannot give him any confirmation. He later learns that Eden Hills does not need any new teachers, but they are looking for a new principal. Wayne shows Susan some graffiti that has been daubed on a school wall and she tells him that she thinks she knows who did it. Wanye chaperones the school formal and the Halloween dance. Wayne leaves a love letter for Elly Conway in her bag, and tells her and Susan that the poor spelling was down to him being nervous. Elly tells him that she is not interested in dating him. Wayne is briefly appointed assistant principal. Finn Kelly later lies to Wayne that he did not get him fired from the job, and turns him against Susan. He also convinces Wayne that Elly has form for giving her students generous marks, so Wayne makes a formal complaint against her. Wayne is pleased when Finn is made acting principal, while Susan recovers from illness. After Finn is removed from the school, Wayne tells Elly that he made the complaint about her grade tampering because Finn promised him the deputy principal position. Elly suspects that Wayne could be Piper Willis' online troll, but after seizing his laptop, Elly finds he is writing a post-apocalyptic romance novel about her. Amy Williams has a one-night stand with Wayne. After he writes her a poem, Amy tells him that nothing more is going to happen between them. Wayne continues to online stalk Amy and Elly, and meets them in The Waterhole for a game of pool. Amy begs for Wayne to leave her alone, so Wayne tells her he never wants to see her again, before leaving. |
| 7 October | Christina Bouchard | Erin Connor | Christina is human resources representative at Eden Hill Grammar. She meets with Erinsborough High principal Susan Kennedy and teacher Brad Willis. Christina tells Brad that Eden Hills has been following his career and offers him a job as Head of Sport. |
| 8 October | Madeleine Hart | Elizabeth Walley | Madeleine runs an antenatal class at the Erinsborough Community Centre, which is attended by Amber Turner and Josh Willis. |
| 9 October | Leon Jones | Tom McCathie | Leon is a homeless man who turns up at Off Air during their suspended coffee scheme. Daniel Robinson serves Leon and later gives him a muffin. As he is closing up, Daniel notices Leon asleep and wakes him. A startled Leon hits Daniel and runs off. |
| 13 October | Sam Mako | Adam May | When Liam Barnett's son Jimmy goes missing, Liam believes Sam has taken him as he owes him money. He arranges to meet Sam in The Waterhole, but Paul Robinson calls the police and has them both taken to the station for questioning. Sam is found to have an alibi. |
| 16 October 2015 – 6 September 2016 | Belinda Bell | Nikki Shiels | Belinda comes to see Stephanie Scully, after reading an article about her finding a missing child. Belinda expresses her worry about Steph being back in Erinsborough. She later speaks with Toadfish Rebecchi about Steph's time in the Bendigo psychiatric hospital. She tells him that Steph is not ready to be back in Erinsborough. Steph later tells Belinda to stay away from her. Steph and Belinda make up and Toadie sees them kissing. Steph tells him that Belinda was her psychiatric nurse and they developed a relationship. Steph catches Belinda going through her handbag looking for her medication and she asks her to leave. Belinda applies for a job at Erinsborough Hospital and tells Steph she wants her back. After Steph learns Belinda spoke to Paul about her condition, she tells her that they will never get back together. Belinda considers buying Number 26 and punches Paul. Someone reports Belinda and Steph's relationship to the hospital board in Bendigo. Belinda believes it was Toadie and threatens him. She is later assigned to his spinal surgery, which causes Sonya Rebecchi to interrupt as she fears Belinda will hurt Toadie. Belinda tries to assure Sonya that she would not hurt a patient. Belinda is suspended from the hospital because of her relationship with Steph. She tells Sonya that Steph is in love with Toadie, causing Sonya to ask her to help Toadie's rehabilitation, hoping that she might also get back together with Steph. Belinda soon quits and leaves Erinsborough, after finding it too hard to be around Steph. Belinda returns when Toadie agrees to represent her in her meeting with the nurse registration board. Paul reveals that he is paying her legal fees in the hope that she will break up Steph and Mark Brennan's relationship. Belinda is refused re-registration as a nurse. She repays Paul what he paid for her legal fees. Belinda kisses Steph, but Steph rejects her, as she loves Mark. When her former patient Ari Philcox stalks Steph, Belinda returns and explains that Ari is in love with her. Belinda later meets with Ari, but Steph's son Charlie Hoyland turns up. She passes him her phone, as she tries to calm Ari down. When he sees Charlie texting for help, Ari produces a knife and threatens them. The police apprehend Ari, but Mark is stabbed in the process. Belinda helps him, before leaving town. |
| 19 October | Gary "Gazza" Saunders | Brendan Bacon | Gazza comes to Erinsborough High to try and sell some cans of liquid fertilizer to Kyle Canning. He later sells them to Aaron Brennan. |
| 21 October | Fire Fighter Mitch | Ben Terrell | Fire Fighter Mitch rescues Susan Kennedy and Amber Turner from a classroom during a fire at Erinsborough High. |
| 22 October 2015 – 8 January 2016, 5 April 2016 | Matilda Turner | Eloise Simbert; Kathleen Vagg | Matilda is Amber Turner and Josh Willis's daughter. Before her birth, she was diagnosed with a congenital diaphragmatic hernia. Amber goes into labour during a fire at Erinsborough High and Matilda is born prematurely by caesarean section. She spends the first few weeks of her life in the neonatal intensive-care unit and later undergoes surgery. Amber and Josh then bring Matilda home. While taking care of Matilda, Josh falls asleep and almost smothers her. Josh initially struggles to take care of Matilda on his own. Amber accepts a job in Brisbane and she takes Matilda with her. Months later, Josh video calls Amber, so he can talk to Matilda one last time before he dies. |
| 23 October | Kerry Foley | Kylee Ellis | Mark Brennan meets with Kerry, a fire investigator, to discuss the Erinsborough High fire. Kerry tells Mark that they think the fire started in the principal's office, but it is too early to say whether it was deliberate or an accident. Kerry also tells Mark that the explosions heard could have been the gas lines or chemicals in the science labs. |
| 11 November | Harrison Saint | Zebedee Howell | Harrison accompanies his mother Cecilia to Fitzgerald Motors, where she calls him Charlie to unnerve Stephanie Scully, and remind her of her own son. Cecilia later has Harrison call Steph to tell her he misses her. |
| 12 November | Dean Holt | Josh Aiello | Dean sends a dead rat to Paul Robinson's penthouse. Paul's bodyguard Aaron Brennan confronts Dean and he explains that the rat was meant for Aaron as he ruined his circuit party business. |
| 12 November | Dennis Cain | Silas James | Dennis meets with Piper Willis and Ben Kirk to discuss their employment with his fruit picking business. He later returns and asks for $200 up front, before the minibus leaves. |
| 23 November–3 December | Stanley Neve | Alex Pinder | Stanley asks Lauren Carpenter about the whereabouts of her father Lou, claiming to be a friend from Cambodia. She tells him that Lou is not yet back from overseas and Stanley leaves. Stanley later attends Lou's memorial service, where Lou accidentally reveals himself. Stanley explains that he found out Lou was having an affair with his wife, so he planted some baking powder in his luggage in the hope that he would get stopped at customs. Stanley then informs Lou that his wife is on her way to Erinsborough to be with him. |
| 30 November–2 December | Indiana Crowe | Georgia Chara | Indiana is Sheila Canning's first Airbnb guest. Tyler Brennan befriends Indiana and takes her into the city to see the Christmas lights. Tyler invites Indiana over to his place. They are interrupted by Piper Willis, who comes over to talk about her problems with Tyler. Indiana bonds with Piper and shows her some zines. She and Tyler spend the rest of the day together, before Kyle drives her to the bus stop. |
