= Josh Willis (Neighbours) =

Fictional character

- Neighbours character
- Portrayed by: Harley Bonner
- Duration: 2013–2016
- First appearance: 20 May 2013
- Last appearance: 27 April 2016
- Introduced by: Richard Jasek
In-universe information
- Occupation: Student; Competitive swimmer; Gym manager; Supplements salesman; Topless waiter; Exotic dancer; Waiter
- Family: Willis
- Father: Brad Willis
- Mother: Terese Willis
- Sisters: Imogen Willis; Piper Willis
- Half-brothers: Ned Willis
- Half-sisters: Paige Smith
- Daughters: Matilda Turner
- Grandfathers: Doug Willis
- Grandmothers: Pam Willis
- Uncles: Nick Petrides

Joshua "Josh" Willis is a fictional character from the Australian soap opera Neighbours, played by Harley Bonner. The actor was cast in the role after being persuaded to attend the audition by his agent. He began filming his first scenes in early February 2013. Bonner's character and his family were created and introduced to Neighbours, as part of an ongoing overhaul of the show's cast and renewed focus on family units within the show. He made his first screen appearance during "Episode 6646", which was first broadcast on 20 May 2013. Bonner left Neighbours to pursue new acting opportunities, and Josh was killed off during the episode broadcast on 5 April 2016.

Josh is portrayed as being driven, "self-motivated", charismatic and having "a real fight in him". Bonner thought viewers would empathise with his character and relate to his "inner conflict." Josh gets on well with his parents and shares a love-hate relationship with his twin sister Imogen (Ariel Kaplan). Josh's storylines have often revolved around his swimming career and his on-off relationship with Amber Turner (Jenna Rosenow). Josh's competitive swimming career later ended when he suffered a shoulder injury as a result of an abseiling accident. He also embarked on a casual relationship with his older neighbour Naomi Canning (Morgana O'Reilly) and was part of a storyline focusing on the consequences of a coward punch he inflicted on Chris Pappas (James Mason), which earned the TV Week Soap Extra Award for Most Topical Storyline of 2015.

== Creation and casting ==
On 7 February 2013, it was announced that the four-strong Willis family would be introduced to Neighbours, as part of an ongoing overhaul of the show's cast and renewed focus on family units. News of the Willis family's introduction came shortly after producers decided to also bring in the five-strong Turner family. Executive producer Richard Jasek commented "As viewers will find out shortly, the Turners are a family of secrets, and the unique backstory of the Willis family is just as compelling." The character of Brad Willis (Kip Gamblin) was reintroduced to the show, along with his wife Terese (Rebekah Elmaloglou) and teenage twins Imogen (Ariel Kaplan) and Joshua.

Actor Harley Bonner was cast as Imogen's twin brother Joshua. His casting was confirmed on 18 February. Bonner's mother, Carla, previously appeared in Neighbours as Stephanie Scully. Bonner explained that he received a call from his agent who told him about the role and asked him to audition for it. Bonner admitted to being hesitant about auditioning, as he was aware that it might look like he was following in his mother's footsteps, while he wanted to be seen as his own person. His agent convinced him to pursue the role and he was then shortlisted for the part. Bonner acted out a scene with the casting director, but did not think he had done a good enough job, until he was offered the role. Bonner said it had been a "smooth process", adding that he was "super excited" about being cast. He and the other actors began filming their first scenes two weeks after the family's casting announcement. Bonner made his first screen appearance as Josh on 20 May 2013.

== Development ==
=== Characterisation ===
Before his introduction, Bonner described Josh as being driven, having set goals and not liking things that get in his way. Bonner told Thomas Mitchell from TV Week that people who are "super driven" would relate to Josh. He explained that Josh has "a real fight in him" and he strives for what he believes in. Bonner added that while Josh does tend to have a one-track mind, he thought viewers would empathise with him and relate to his "inner conflict." A writer for the show's official website agreed with Bonner's assessment of the character, calling Josh "highly self-motivated" and "a natural born competitor". The writer pointed out that Josh inherited his charisma from his father and his drive from his mother. Bonner said Josh got on well with his parents and called the Willises "a great family unit". He added "We've clicked really well as actors as well as characters. It was funny when we first met, as the family dynamic of the Willises was quite similar to the way we were in person." Bonner stated that Josh and Imogen have "a sort of love-hate relationship". Josh loves his sister, but he does not like it when she tells him how to do things.

In May 2014, Josh was diagnosed with alcohol intolerance after collapsing during his 18th birthday party. Bonner said Josh was feeling excited ahead of the party, explaining "I guess it's a rite of passage for him, and he sees it as a chance to spread his wings." While Josh was playing around, he suddenly collapsed and his family assumed that he had drunk too much alcohol. However, after undergoing some tests, Josh was given his diagnosis. Bonner said Josh was disappointed, but instead of feeling sorry for himself, he decided to take some inspiration from his grandfather, Doug (Terence Donovan), and focus on his future. The following year, Bonner admitted that he would probably be friends with Josh in real life. He pointed out that Josh had no friends within the show and he liked to support the underdog. Bonner said there would be some big drama coming up for Josh and he hoped he would make friends with someone he could have light hearted conversations with.

=== Swimming career ===
Following his arrival, it was established that Josh was an elite swimmer training for the 2014 Commonwealth Games. His father was his coach and Gamblin said Josh was "sort of" Brad's protégé. Bonner admitted that he had to overcome his fear of deep water to film Josh's training scenes in a real-life Olympic pool. Bonner explained that he did not like going underwater or getting his head wet, so he initially did not swim too far away from the side of the pool. Bonner eventually overcame his fears to become a confident swimmer. Hudson Walsh (Remy Hii) was later introduced to the show as a love interest for another character and a rival for Josh. Hii told Digital Spy's Daniel Kilkelly that Hudson and Josh would clash, as they were both elite sportspeople trying to win the same medal. Hii continued, "However, I guess the difference with them is they know what each other is going through, which helps them understand each other." Hii did not think Hudson was as competitive as Josh, but believed he was more confident because he had a natural ability.

When Josh became frustrated with his father's coaching methods, he asked a rival coach, Don Cotter (John Adam), for advice. Don invited Josh to join his squad and Josh agreed, devastating Brad. A few weeks later, Josh learned that Don was forcing Hudson to take performance-enhancing drugs, while holding Josh back. Josh decided to sack Don as his coach and resumed training with Brad. In January 2014, Brad resigned as Josh's coach after becoming fed up of Josh's lack of focus. Josh allowed himself to be distracted when his public profile started to grow. Instead of spending his time training, he started focusing on fame. When Josh refused to take responsibility for his poor performance in the pool, Brad lost patience and fired his son a week before the selection trials for the Commonwealth Games began.

=== Relationship with Amber Turner ===
"I think they make a horrible couple. They are constantly fighting and breaking up. They are totally dysfunctional and I don't know what I feel about their future. I don't know whether I am hopeful or whether I am just going to go with it, like I think Josh is."

— Bonner on Josh and Amber's relationship

Following Josh's arrival, promotional pictures of him with Amber Turner (Jenna Rosenow) were released. When asked if a romance would develop between the two characters, Bonner said "Hmmm, there's not a lot I can say now but there is a bit of a connection, but I'm not sure where it will go!" Amber immediately developed a crush on Josh, but he kept missing her "subtle attempts at flirtation". Amber resorted to following Josh to the local pool to watch him train, but he was too busy to notice her. Amber later told Josh that she had been watching him, but he did not seem to mind. When an embarrassed Amber asked then him out on a date, Josh had to turn her down as he had a meeting with the school principal. Amber jumped to the conclusion that she had messed things up and assumed Josh was not romantically interested in her.

Josh and Amber eventually grew close when she helped him with his homework and after sharing a kiss, they began dating. The couple later broke up and when Amber saw Josh chatting to another girl at a party, she decided to get even. After being introduced to Clay Blair (Charlie Terrier), Amber kissed him. At the same time, Josh was looking for Amber and Rosenow explained "Josh was trying to get away from the girl. When he finally does, he goes to find Amber." Josh eventually found Amber and witnessed the kiss, leaving him devastated. While Amber was unaware that Josh had seen her with Clay, Imogen did and found herself stuck in the middle of her best friend and brother. Rosenow commented that Imogen was all too aware that Josh did not have a good track record and she did not want Amber to get hurt. Amber later agreed to go on a date with Clay, leaving Josh convinced that they would not get back together.

After Amber admitted to having sex with her ex-boyfriend, she and Josh struggled to get things back to normal. They were then banned from seeing each other by their respective parents, who believed they were spending too much time together. Realising that they needed to fix their relationship, Amber and Josh began sneaking around. They were soon caught by neighbour Susan Kennedy (Jackie Woodburne) who told their parents. Susan also revealed that Josh was in danger of failing the school year, causing Josh to make "a strong stand for independence" by quitting school and making Amber and his training his priorities. Amber and Josh were divided by their different hopes for their relationship, especially when Josh thought they were ready to have sex. He was then surprised when Amber asked him to wait at least six months before they had sex. A Soap World columnist questioned whether a "lovestruck and sex-starved" Josh could stay celibate. While Bonner did not think Josh and Amber made a good couple, he believed they genuinely loved each other.

Josh broke up with Amber following an argument over her new job. Josh struggled to deal with the break up, but he was soon distracted when local journalist Ruby Knox (Maggie Naouri) came to interview him. Ruby made it clear that she was interested in Josh and they shared a kiss. Bonner explained that Josh was scared by Ruby's strong advances towards him, but he was flattered as she was older than him. The actor believed the kiss was nothing more than a rebound thing and that Josh did want anything more to happen. Bonner admitted that he thought there was a real connection between Josh and Ruby, but realised that she was just using his character to get a story. He said Ruby kissed Josh to get him close and Bonner branded her "a tactical journalist." Despite not being in a relationship at the time, Josh felt guilty about the kiss and chose not to tell Amber when they got back together. He assured Amber that she was the one for him and they finally consummated their relationship.

=== Abseiling accident ===
In early February 2014, Josh suffered a serious shoulder injury that ended his swimming career. Prior to the accident, Josh and Amber had planned a romantic camping trip, but realising that neither of them could drive, they were forced to invite Imogen and Mason Turner (Taylor Glockner) along. Josh was not happy with Mason coming as they were not friends and Josh thought Imogen could do better than Mason. The rivalry between Josh and Mason came to a head when Mason challenged Josh to go abseiling. Bonner told Inside Soap's Sarah Ellis that with Josh's competitive nature, he was not going to let Mason get the upper hand and agreed to do it. However, just as Josh started his descent, a carabiner clip broke and Josh fell to the ground. Josh was rushed to hospital, where he learned that while his life was not in danger, he had suffered a serious shoulder injury. Bonner said "Josh bangs up his shoulder pretty badly, which is the worst thing that could happen for a swimmer." Josh underwent surgery on his shoulder and Bonner explained that from a medical perspective the surgery went well, but in terms of his career, it was a "disaster".

Josh was devastated when he was told that he would not be able to swim competitively again. Needing someone to blame, Josh and his family pointed the finger at Mason and war was declared between the Turner and Willis families. Not prepared to give up on his swimming career, Josh went to the gym to build up his strength. Bonner pointed out that Josh was a strong person mentally, who overcame hurdles before, so he believed this was just another one. When Josh experienced a "searing pain" during training, he was forced to face the fact that his body was not capable of doing what it used to do. Bonner stated that was the moment that Josh became desperate, saying "His mental state isn't where it should be." Determined to carry on with his training, Josh decided to accept some strong painkillers from a drug user at the gym. Bonner explained that Josh told himself the painkillers were harmless and okay for him to use. However, he knew it was not right, but it was easier to talk himself into taking them.

=== Casual relationship with Naomi Canning ===
In July 2014, Susan Hill from the Daily Star reported that Josh would begin a casual relationship with his older neighbour Naomi Canning (Morgana O'Reilly) following his break-up with Amber. Bonner explained that when Josh moves some boxes to the hotel for Naomi, they flirt and Josh hinted that they should go to a hotel room, but Naomi rejected his offer. However, while they were in an elevator together, Naomi hit the emergency stop button and they had sex. Bonner commented that the hook-up was good for Josh, saying "after everything Josh went through with Amber, it's a realistic avenue for him to explore." Due to the large age gap between them, Josh and Naomi decided to keep their casual relationship a secret. The relationship was almost discovered by Sheila when she returned home unexpectedly and interrupted Naomi and Josh. Naomi forced Josh to hide outside in the garden wearing nothing. Naomi ended the relationship after Terese found out about it and confronted her.

=== Coward punch ===
In September 2014, Neighbours launched a storyline focusing on the consequences of a coward punch. During Kyle and Georgia's joint bucks and hen night, Chris was forced to eject a drunk Josh from The Waterhole when he started causing a scene. Shortly after, Josh returned and hit Chris with a coward punch, causing him to fall and hit his head. Mason commented that the storyline was a topical issue in Australia at the time and the moral of it would be "that one little mistake can have really dire consequences." Mason thought that Chris might be able to forgive Josh in the future, but it would be "a long process", and he would have to deal with the fact that his life has changed forever due to the attack. Mason also thought that Chris would have difficulties accepting that someone like Josh attacked him.

A guilt-ridden Josh attempted to make up for attacking Chris by helping out at the garage where he worked. Josh realised that Chris had been struggling, so he decided to work there in secret. Josh's good deed ended when he got crushed between two cars and ended up in hospital with minor injuries. Josh tried to keep the incident a secret from Chris, but he soon found out and offered Josh no sympathy. Bonner explained, "Chris feels like he's being made to feel guilty because Josh hurt himself while trying to make it up to him." Bonner praised the storyline for raising awareness of how a "stupid" split-second decision could change the lives of so many people.

=== Exotic dancing ===
In an effort to earn money for an operation for his sick daughter, Josh teamed up with Aaron Brennan (Matt Wilson) to form an exotic dance duo called The Heat. Bonner and Wilson attended classes at the Ministry of Dance and took lessons with a choreographer for the dance numbers. Bonner admitted that he was nervous, but once the cameras began rolling, he was not bothered. Bonner said Josh was "terrified" when the Heat received their first booking, a 50th birthday party. Aaron and Josh put together a routine on the day and although it started off "a bit rough", the female audience enjoyed it. After performing the "raunchy" routine, Josh was packing up their gear when Sue Parker (Kate Gorman) propositioned him. Bonner stated, "He doesn't know what she means to start with, but then he realises she wants some sexy time with him!" Sue asked Josh to spend the night with her in return for money. Bonner added that Josh considered the proposal as he was willing to try anything to help his sick daughter.

=== Departure ===
When Bonner chose to leave Neighbours to pursue new acting opportunities, the decision was taken to kill Josh off during the "Hotel Death Trap" storyline on 5 April 2016. When the boiler room at Lassiter's Hotel exploded, Josh and Daniel were both injured by a fallen column. Josh sacrificed himself to save Daniel. His family gathered to say their goodbyes, while he also spoke to Amber and Matilda via video call, with Rosenow reprising her role as Amber for the scenes. Josh later appeared to Imogen in her dreams.

== Storylines ==
Josh moves onto Ramsay Street with his family, after his mother gets a job at the local hotel. During swim practice, Josh is given some advice by another coach Don Cotter. While Brad rejects Don's advice, Josh later makes the decision to hire Don as his coach. Josh struggles to keep up with his school work and Amber Turner offers to help. She later tells him that she did not understand the subject, but wanted to impress him. Josh kisses her and they begin dating. When Josh turns up late to training, Don offers him an ultimatum – Amber or swimming. Josh chooses swimming, but does not break up with Amber and tells Don she is stalking him when he catches them together. When Amber realises what Josh said, she breaks up with him. Don switches Josh to middle-distance swimming, so there is less competition for his rival Hudson Walsh. Josh later realises Don has been under timing him and fires him.

Josh attempts to reunite with Amber, but he sees her kissing someone else. Brad starts coaching Hudson and Josh is initially hostile towards him. Josh learns Amber's ex-boyfriend, Robbo Slade (Aaron Jakubenko), is using footage of her having sex with him to blackmail her brother Mason. Josh, Mason, Hudson and Chris Pappas (James Mason) arrange to pay Robbo. Josh confronts Robbo on his own and is punched. When Robbo dies after being involved in a hit-and-run, Josh is briefly considered a suspect, until Hudson confesses. Josh and Amber get back together, and he quits school to focus on his swimming. Josh and Amber break up twice due to his failure to take her ambition to be a photographer seriously and his kiss with journalist Ruby Knox. Josh wins a local emerging talent award and his public profile increases. He begins missing training sessions and is rude to his father. Terese eventually manages to convince him to return to serious training.

Josh qualifies for the Commonwealth Games, but his competitive swimming career ends when he injures his shoulder in an abseiling accident. Josh buys painkillers from a drug dealer and Amber tells his parents, causing Josh to break up with her. Imogen persuades the couple to get back together. Josh returns to school and has to repeat a year. At his joint eighteenth birthday party, Josh collapses after he drinks a glass of champagne and learns he is alcohol intolerant. Dejected by this, he is inspired by Daniel Robinson (Tim Phillipps) to take up skateboarding. Josh becomes jealous when Daniel says that he and Amber share a spiritual 'vibe', but both insist it is not physical. Josh flirts with newcomer Paige Novak (Olympia Valance). Josh is fined by the police after Jayden Warley (Khan Oxenham) injures himself copying one of his skateboarding stunts. Jayden's mother, Sue Parker (Kate Gorman) threatens to sue Josh, but Daniel talks her out of it. Josh discovers Amber has been having an affair with Daniel and he ends their relationship.

After quitting school for a second time, Josh becomes the manager of the local gym. Josh and Imogen learn Paige is their half-sister. Josh is more accepting of the news, until he learns that she knew about Amber's feelings for Daniel. Josh embarks on a casual relationship with Naomi Canning. Josh gets drunk at Kyle and Georgia's engagement party and punches Chris, causing him serious injury. Feeling guilty, Josh sells his swimming trophies to pay for Chris's rehabilitation and he leaves food parcels for him. He also gives a talk at the community centre about the consequences of his actions. Josh helps at the garage to save Chris's job, which leads to an accident where he is crushed between two cars. Josh is given 300 hours of community service and a two-year suspended sentence for hitting Chris. Josh admits that he still loves Amber and vows to win her back, but she reunites with Daniel. Josh comforts Amber when Daniel fails to turn up for their wedding, and they have sex.

Josh finds out Amber is pregnant, but Paige assures him that the baby is Daniel's. Josh befriends Danni Ferguson (Laura McIntosh), the woman who killed Amber's father, and they later share a kiss and continue to meet until Danni breaks off contact. Amber tells Josh that he could be the father of her baby and he uses the information to try to get closer to her. Amber becomes stressed and leaves Erinsborough, but Daniel and Josh track her down. She asks them to leave after an argument breaks out. She later collapses from the stress. A paternity test reveals that Josh is the baby's father. Josh is hired by Forrest Jones (Nicholas Gunn) to sell nutritional supplements. Imogen suspects Josh's new job is a pyramid scheme and gets him fired, but Forrest gives Josh his job back. Amber and Josh learn their baby has congenital diaphragmatic hernia (CDH) and a 50% chance of survival. They decide to go to the United States for further treatment, despite opposition from their families.

Josh begins selling illegal peptides, but is fired when Imogen threatens to expose Forrest. Amber asks Josh to give her some space, but he contacts her through an online forum, pretending to be a young mother named Phoebe. Josh befriends Aaron Brennan and they form an exotic dance duo called The Heat. Following a performance at a birthday party, Josh is approached by Sue Parker, who offers him money to spend the night with her. Josh and Amber learn that they are expecting a daughter and that her CDH is mild. Aaron encourages Josh to come clean about Phoebe, but Amber discovers the truth before he can. She tells him that from now on, he can only be there for the baby. Josh has a relationship with barmaid Courtney Grixti (Emma Lane), which ends when he asks if he can move in with her during his parents' separation. He then has an affair with Naomi, who is having doubts about her engagement to Paul. When Paul finds out, he appears to forgive them both. After the police received an anonymous tip off, they search Josh's bag and arrest him for possessing illegal peptides. The charges are dropped when CCTV footage shows the peptides were planted in his bag. Josh later learns that Paul set him up in revenge for his affair with Naomi. Imogen gives Josh a USB flash drive that contains Paul's encrypted files and he teams up with Nate Kinski (Meyne Wyatt) to open them. Josh learns that the council are closing the high school and he tells Susan Kennedy (Jackie Woodburne). Amber goes into premature labour and is rushed to hospital, where Josh is waiting. She gives birth to their daughter, who is quickly admitted to the neonatal intensive care unit. Josh and Amber name their daughter Matilda (Eloise Simbert), and she undergoes a successful operation.

Shortly after bringing Matilda home, Josh almost rolls on her when he falls asleep. When Josh admits that he is overwhelmed, Amber tells him that he should not be alone with Matilda. Josh learns Amber is planning to move to Queensland with Matilda and tries to stop her, before deciding to join them. However, when Josh kisses Amber, she believes he is still suffering from post-natal depression and asks him to stay in Erinsborough. In the wake of Amber's departure, Josh makes himself sick with excessive exercise. He later admits he has not been feeling a paternal connection with Matilda, and decides to stay away from her until he is ready to be a father. Josh helps Brad train Brodie Chaswick (Matt Testro), and is infuriated to discover Piper and Brodie have a secret relationship. Josh decides to move to Brisbane to be closer to Matilda. However, Josh is caught up in the boiler room explosion at Lassiter's Hotel and pinned under a fallen column. Daniel is trapped by the same column, but Karl explains that if they move it to save Daniel, Josh will die. Josh sacrifices himself for Daniel, and after saying goodbye to his family and Matilda, Josh dies.

== Reception ==
In 2014, Bonner won the Soap Extra Award for Most Topical Storyline for his character Josh's coward punch storyline with Chris Pappas. Peter Dyke and Katie Begley from the Daily Star cited Bonner and his character as one of the reasons extra female viewers were tuning into Neighbours. While Laura Morgan from All About Soap branded Josh a "hunky newcomer". Morgan later observed that Josh was "secretly pleased" when Imogen broke up with Mason, but thought he should "wise up to the fact Amber's been crushing on him for weeks", before interfering in his sister's love life. Of Amber and Josh, a TV Week columnist quipped "Never before have two such genetically blessed individuals been drawn together." The columnist also thought that the relationship would be over in "record time" because of Josh's dedication to his swimming. Anthony D. Langford from TheBacklot.com disliked the pairing, calling them "a really boring, chemistry free couple."

The Daily Record's Tony Stewart pointed out that "it hasn't taken young Joshua long to get over his 'heartbreaking' split from Amber, because he's soon locking lips with another young lady." Langford liked the rivalry storyline between Josh and Hudson, and commented "I do agree that Joshua needs to give it a rest in regards to Hudson. His endless whining isn't attractive. I like that even Brad told him to shut up and focus on his swimming." Langford thought it was a shame that Josh was not gay too, as it would have made for a love triangle storyline, believing Josh and Hudson's fighting hid "an underlying attraction." In April 2014, Langford checked on Josh and found things had not changed, saying he was "still annoying and his romance with Amber is still chemistry free and boring."

Stephen Downie liked Josh's relationship with Naomi, commenting, "The romance between Josh and Naomi has a use-by date but, much like the couple, we're willing to enjoy this ride while it lasts." Claire Crick from All About Soap praised the pairing and said "we love their hilarious secret hook-ups, especially when they end with Josh dashing naked across Ramsay Street!"
