= Naomi Canning =

Fictional character from the Australian soap opera Neighbours

- Neighbours character
- Portrayed by: Morgana O'Reilly
- Duration: 2014–2015, 2020, 2022
- First appearance: 25 March 2014
- Last appearance: 28 July 2022
- Introduced by: Richard Jasek (2014); Jason Herbison (2020)
In-universe information
- Occupation: Executive assistant Wrestling events organiser
- Father: Frank Canning
- Mother: Sheila Canning
- Brothers: Gary Canning; Frank Canning Jr.
- Nephews: Kyle Canning

Naomi Canning is a fictional character from the Australian soap opera Neighbours, played by Morgana O'Reilly. Naomi was introduced as the daughter of established character Sheila Canning (Colette Mann) after producers decided they wanted to explore her background further. O'Reilly filmed her first audition in her garden in Sydney, before flying to Melbourne to audition in studio. She competed with five other actresses for the part, but she believed that she was meant to get the role as Naomi is her middle name. A week after the second audition, O'Reilly's agent informed her that she had won the role. O'Reilly then relocated to Melbourne and began filming her first scenes in November 2013. She made her first screen appearance on 25 March 2014. The character departed on 2 October 2015, following O'Reilly's decision to pursue new acting roles. O'Reilly later reprised the role and Naomi returned on 7 May 2020 and appeared in the show's final episode on 28 July 2022.

Naomi is portrayed as being spoilt, sophisticated, quirky and caring. O'Reilly did not think Naomi was truly bad, despite her questionable actions. O'Reilly worked closely with the producers, the costume and make-up departments to find the right look for Naomi, whose style she described as sassy and "quite sexual". Naomi's initial storylines focused on reconciliation with her mother, after they fell out over Naomi's affair with a married man. Naomi then tests one of the serial's established marriages after she develops feelings for Toadfish Rebecchi (Ryan Moloney) and exploits the problems in his marriage. She also engages in a casual relationship with her much younger neighbour, Josh Willis (Harley Bonner). Producers later paired her with Mark Brennan (Scott McGregor) and Paul Robinson (Stefan Dennis), whom she becomes engaged to. Naomi and her storylines received mostly positive attention from viewers and critics, with one dubbing her "the best new character of the last few years" and another calling her "a breath of fresh air".

== Creation and casting ==
In October 2013, cast member Colette Mann, who plays Sheila Canning, revealed that her character's daughter was going to be introduced. Producers decided to bring in another member of Sheila's family as they wanted to explore her background further. The producers were also keen to introduce a character similar to Izzy Hoyland (Natalie Bassingthwaighte), who would provoke strong reactions among the characters and viewers. Mann added that the role was in the process of being cast and the character would arrive the following year. On 30 December 2013, it was announced that New Zealand actress Morgana O'Reilly had been cast as Naomi. O'Reilly attended two rounds of auditions before being cast. She and her husband filmed her first audition in their garden in Sydney, before O'Reilly flew to Melbourne to audition in the studio, alongside Mann and Stefan Dennis (Paul Robinson).

She competed with five other actresses for the part, but she believed that the role was meant to be hers, as Naomi is both her grandmother's name and her middle name. O'Reilly also said, "When I got the scripts, I really loved how Naomi works on lots of levels at all times. That is extremely satisfying to play as an actor." A week after the second audition, O'Reilly's agent informed her that she had won the role. She and her husband then relocated to Melbourne from Sydney to be closer to the studios. O'Reilly was initially offered a three-year contract, but she felt that was too long and suggested an 18-month contract instead, which produces agreed to. O'Reilly began filming her first scenes in November 2013 and she made her screen debut as Naomi on 25 March 2014.

== Development ==
=== Characterisation ===
Before her arrival, O'Reilly said Naomi was "a lot of fun", but she would be hiding some secrets and it would be interesting to see the lengths she would go to in order to keep them hidden, particularly from her mother. O'Reilly described Naomi as having a "good heart", but when it comes to getting what she wants, some of her actions are "questionable". She also said Naomi is good at turning a situation to her advantage, and likened her to a cat, as she enjoys the "finer things in life". The actress continued, "On top of all that, she is her mother's daughter. She has the Canning straight up, strength and vulgarity that her genes and upbringing have given her in spades. She's quirky but sophisticated, and at times petulant and silly. All in all, she is very, very fun to play." O'Reilly did not think Naomi is bad, but she was spoilt and always tries to get her own way. However, underneath the surface, she is kind and caring. When asked whether viewers would like Naomi, O'Reilly believed that she could turn out to be a "character everyone loves to hate".

O'Reilly explained that Naomi's style was harder to get right and she worked with the producers, the costume and make-up departments to find the right look. The actress said, "She has to have a sense of sass and sexuality about her, but she's not cheap and she has worked very hard to shake off her trashy past. What we've come up with is amazing. Some days I put my costume on for a scene and think, 'Oh Naomi, you're outrageous! I could never wear this! Oh well. Go get 'em girl!'" O'Reilly thought some of Naomi's outfits complimented her "quite sexual" nature, especially the six-inch heels and small tops. O'Reilly admitted that she did not have too much in common with Naomi, but they could both be "goofy and funny". She thought Naomi is not as level-headed as she is in real life. She also said that she enjoyed playing a character who was different from herself. Executive producer Jason Herbison told Sarah Ellis from Inside Soap that he thought Naomi's type of character – a "classic, troublemaking vixen, who underneath it all is just deeply insecure" – had been missing from Neighbours for a few years.

=== Early storylines ===
Naomi's first storyline focus on her unexpected arrival in Erinsborough and her reconciliation with her mother, Sheila (Mann), who she had not spoken to in five years. They previously fell out when Sheila discovered Naomi's affair with a married man and told his wife, which Naomi had never forgiven her for. Naomi's first scenes see her meeting and flirting with Paul Robinson (Dennis), who is later surprised to learn that she is Sheila's daughter. She then reunites with her mother and her nephew, Kyle (Chris Milligan). While Sheila is pleased to see her daughter, she is suspicious of her motives and sudden urge to see her. Mann commented, "Sheila has learned the hard way that there is always an agenda with Naomi. Nothing is ever as it seems." When Sheila finds a discarded SIM card, she hopes to find some clues as to why her daughter has reappeared in her life. After seeing a lot of numbers and messages stored on the card, Sheila believes Naomi is having another affair. She then accuses Naomi of repeating her past mistakes and "a fierce war of words" erupts between the two, which results in Naomi deciding to leave. Sheila then promises not to interfere in her life and "reluctantly" offers Naomi a place to stay, until she got back on her feet.

A few weeks later, Naomi sells a valuable painting to Paul in order to pay off her debts. However, the painting was given to her by Charles Tranner (David Whiteley), the married man she had an affair with, and his wife, Polly (Michelle O'Grady), soon turns up to reclaim the artwork. O'Reilly explained that as Charles was away on business, there was no definite answer as to who the painting belonged to. She continued, "Naomi says it was a gift, and belongs to her – but Polly argues that Charles used family money to buy it, so she is the owner." Polly and Naomi later end up in a scrag fight, which has to be broken up the police. O'Reilly enjoyed filming the fight, saying she had "a great time". The police eventually confiscate the painting and Paul demands his money back. When Naomi is unable to pay him back, Paul asks her to spend the night with him for him to forget the debt. O'Reilly said that while Naomi is not amused, part of her admired Paul's tenacity.

=== Toadfish Rebecchi ===
"She finds something in Toadie that she hasn't found in a man before. He is a decent, lovely, caring man who makes her laugh. As we know, this is lady kryptonite. And remember, when Naomi wants something, she goes for it."

— O'Reilly on Naomi's feelings for Toadie.

Shortly before Naomi's first scenes were broadcast, Daniel Kilkelly from Digital Spy reported that she would test one of the show's established relationships by setting her sights on a married man. Ryan Moloney, who plays Toadfish Rebecchi, previously hinted that his character might be tempted by another woman and it was later confirmed that Naomi would develop feelings for Toadie. The storyline begins when Toadie hires Naomi to be his new personal assistant at his law office. While Naomi runs the office well, Toadie's wife, Sonya (Eve Morey), does not fully trust her, even after she helps Sonya out with a business problem. Naomi later convinces Toadie that Sonya would be a liability if she attended a meeting with some important clients with him, and then makes sure that Sonya is busy when the meeting takes place. Sheila, noticing her daughter's "intimate" celebrations with Toadie, then accuses her of trying to seduce another married man. This prompts Naomi to arrange a romantic evening for Toadie and Sonya, while she has dinner with Paul to throw Sheila off the scent.

Naomi later signs up for an internet dating website and uses it to drive a wedge between Sonya and Toadie. Naomi finds a guy she thought would be perfect for Sonya and then asks her and Toadie to come on the date for moral support. Naomi's date ends up having an argument with Sonya, causing Toadie to apologise to Naomi for ruining her date and comforting her. Naomi continues to cause problems for Sonya and Toadie's marriage and when Sonya goes away, Naomi decides to make her move. She invites herself over to Toadie's house, where they enjoy watching DVDs together. Moloney explained that it was all innocent to begin with, but when they begin trying out wrestling moves, Toadie should have realised that it was not a good idea. However, Toadie does not stop Naomi and she pins him to the floor and then kisses him. Moloney admitted that Toadie was "mortified" by the kiss, but it made him realise that he has no emotional investment in Naomi at all. Sheila then tells Toadie that Naomi has been trying to seduce him for weeks and Toadie feels "duped." Moloney said, "He trusted Naomi and appreciated their friendship, and now he's been blindsided. He feels utterly betrayed when he discovers the whole situation was premeditated."

When Sonya returns home and discovers what Naomi had done, she is furious with her for lying and trying to undermine her marriage. When Naomi and Sonya come face-to-face, Naomi provokes her and blames her for the troubles in her marriage, causing Sonya to "impulsively" slap her. Morey revealed that she was uncomfortable about having to film the slapping scene, as she "adores" O'Reilly. Sonya eventually apologises to Naomi, but tells her to stay away from her family and Morey called it a "pretty satisfying" moment. When asked whether the tension between Sonya and Naomi would continue to be explored, O'Reilly explained that things between them would remain awkward for quite some time, but she hoped that the characters would become friends, as she wanted to share more scenes with Morey. O'Reilly also thought that Sonya was right to trust Toadie when he re-hires Naomi, but said that it the experience would be hard for Naomi.

When Toadie takes on a difficult case, his reasons for doing so makes Naomi realise that she still had feelings for him. When Sheila "assassinates his character", Naomi tells her that she is still in love with him. She then quits the law firm and, on the advice of her mother, chooses to distract herself from Toadie by temporarily leaving Erinsborough. The storyline was devised to accommodate O'Reilly's two-month break from filming in order to perform her one-woman show at the Edinburgh Festival Fringe. The break was agreed upon when O'Reilly got the part and she was thankful to the producers for giving her the time off. Upon her return, Georgia Brooks (Saskia Hampele) learns that Naomi had been in Melbourne instead of Hawaii and Toadie accuses her of sending Sonya poison-pen letters. Naomi denies being the sender.

=== Casual relationship with Josh Willis ===
Naomi has a casual relationship with her much younger neighbour, Josh Willis (Harley Bonner). Alison Gardner of What's on TV noted that they were both on the rebound, as Naomi is getting over her crush on Toadie and Josh has recently broken up with Amber Turner (Jenna Rosenow). O'Reilly thought the development was good for both characters, commenting "I think it's quite nice for Naomi to have someone who wants to kiss her back, but I think she's enjoying it for purely shallow reasons." O'Reilly told Mark James Lowe from All About Soap that the relationship comes out of the blue for Naomi and was not planned. The actress also told Lowe that she was not surprised when she received the storyline and compared Naomi's life to "a really trashy novel." After Josh starts showing interest in her, Naomi decides to "take the bull by the horns and go for it!"

O'Reilly said the scenes in which Josh and Naomi have sex in a hotel elevator were not awkward to film, as Bonner's sense of humour made the shoot fun for her. O'Reilly also explained to Lowe that Naomi is concerned about keeping the fling from her mother, as Naomi is trying to get her life back under control and she does not want to ruin their relationship again. Naomi ends the fling after Josh's mother, Terese Willis (Rebekah Elmaloglou), finds them and confronts Naomi. O'Reilly thought Naomi and Josh were well suited, as they had "similar energies", but ultimately he was too young for her. She added that she wanted her character to have a relationship with someone "completely different", like a "rough-and-tumble guy" or someone dangerous.

=== Brother and career change ===
In November 2014, Naomi is reunited with her older brother, Gary Canning (Damien Richardson), after he decides to extend his stay in Erinsborough to reconcile with Sheila and Kyle. Naomi is angry with her mother's "blatant favouritism" of Gary and urges him to reveal the truth about his past and the reason why he abandoned his family. When Kyle's work tools are stolen, Naomi makes "more damning accusations" against Gary. After Sheila learns that Gary had committed a violent assault, she has a heart attack. Naomi finds her mother unconscious and rushes her to the hospital, where "an incensed" Naomi then reveals to Kyle the full truth about Gary's criminal history.

Needing a new job, Naomi decides to start her own events business, and takes on the role of organising the local Christmas carols in Lassiter's Complex. Naomi faces difficulties with the event when the "Santa Union" refuses to provide a Father Christmas or Snowman, forcing Naomi to ask her mother and neighbour, Susan Kennedy (Jackie Woodburne), for help. The event then comes under threat from a councillor, who informs Naomi that she does not have the correct insurance. Once the issue is sorted, the carols go ahead as planned. Naomi's next job is to plan the Erinsborough Festival. Local businessman Dennis Dimato (David Serafin) approaches Paul and Naomi about sponsoring the event, but when Mark Brennan (Scott McGregor) informs them that Dimatio had "a dodgy past", Paul and Naomi turn down his offer.

O'Reilly thought the development was interesting as the old Naomi would have teamed up with Dimato. Dimato later tries to bribe Naomi, and Brennan encourages her to go to the police, but she refuses and gives the money back. Brennan confronts Dimato, who then corners Naomi and threatens her for talking about the bribe. O'Reilly commented that Naomi was annoyed at Brennan's interference, as she felt she could handle Dimato. She continued, "She's tough as nails. She would never admit there is danger there – and especially not to Brennan!" Matt Turner (Josef Brown) later asks for Naomi's help, so the police can build a case against Dimato. Naomi gives a statement, even though she is still receiving threats from Dimato and his men. Dimato later targets Sheila, forcing Naomi to retract her statement. Matt tries to get her to change her mind, but it is only when Sheila learns what she had done and tells her to re-submit her statement when Naomi agrees.

=== Mark Brennan and Paul Robinson ===
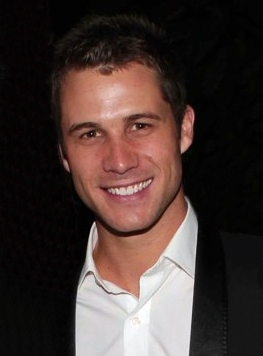
Writers established a love story between Naomi and Mark Brennan, played by Scott McGregor (pictured).

Naomi's friendship with Brennan eventually turns into a romance, after they grow closer during the Dimato situation. O'Reilly said that Naomi was initially "oblivious" to Brennan's feelings for her. She told an Inside Soap columnist that Naomi was wary of Brennan and figured that he was not ready for a relationship, but neither was she. During a yoga session, Naomi and Brennan flirt heavily and eventually share a kiss. Naomi tries to take the relationship slowly as she is scared of being hurt. Naomi and Brennan later declare themselves an official couple, despite Naomi's insecurities. When Naomi sees Brennan exchange glances with his ex-girlfriend, Paige Smith (Olympia Valance), she becomes anxious about her relationship and questions Brennan as to who he wants to be with. As Naomi and Brennan's relationship starts to "gain ground", Naomi is hired to be Paul's executive assistant and she is told in confidence that he has been diagnosed with leukaemia.

Naomi begins to do everything to help Paul and a TV Soap columnist noted "although their working relationship has often been a tense one, Paul and Naomi have always managed to make it work." While Naomi home-nurses Paul, her mother becomes suspicious, worrying that it might impact Naomi's relationship with Brennan. This forces Paul to defend their connection. When Paul is informed that his body is no longer responding to the chemotherapy, he starts putting his affairs in order and shows a vulnerable side to Naomi. While comforting him, Naomi is "overcome with emotion" and she kisses Paul. Despite trying to make their relationship more professional, Naomi realises that she had developed feelings for Paul and she decides to break up with Brennan.

Paul and Naomi eventually embark on a relationship, but are faced with problems early on when she interferes in his family business by contacting his estranged daughter, Amy Williams (Zoe Cramond). Paul confronts Naomi in public, but with Sheila supporting her, Naomi refuses to apologise and threatens to quit her job and their relationship. Paul later apologises to Naomi, as he has now bonded with Amy. O'Reilly believes Paul and Naomi's relationship would "stand the test of time" and joked that their pairing would be part of Neighbours history. Paul and Naomi's romance is tested when Naomi learns of Paul's involvement in her brother's crime, and when Paul questions whether she was still in love with Toadie, following an accident that was her fault. Naomi tells him that she admires Toadie as he was a good man, something that Paul was not. Paul promises to be a better man and later proposes to Naomi.

The proposal surprises Naomi, as they had only been dating for a few months, but she "feels duty bound" to accept. Naomi instantly has second thoughts and when Paul wants to tell everyone, in the hope that it might boost his mayoral position, she asks him to keep their engagement a secret. Naomi and Paul's relationship eventually ends after she has a one-night stand with Josh. Paul asks if they could try and work out their differences, but Naomi declines and he told her she would not amount to anything.

=== Departure ===
During 2015, O'Reilly became pregnant. On screen, O'Reilly's pregnancy was covered up by her holding large objects, mainly folders, in front of her stomach. Following her split from Paul, Naomi learns that she has secured a dream job in the United States. She leaves Erinsborough after saying goodbye to her family and friends. The day after her exit aired in Australia, it was confirmed that O'Reilly had permanently left Neighbours to pursue new career opportunities after the birth of her daughter. Of her exit, Herbison commented, "The Neighbours audience fell in love with Naomi instantly and we have certainly left the door wide open for her to rejoin the Cannings in the future – Sheila wouldn't have it any other way." O'Reilly then posted to social media, "Thank you so much for all your lovely words for Naomi. She has been a blast to play! When I first started on Neighbours I thought you guys would hate us (me and Nomes), trying to break up Toadie and Sonya and what not. But I what I have come to learn is that you Neighbours fans are a riotous bunch, who appreciate a sassy character with a dubious background and sneaky ways."

O'Reilly believed that Naomi had "a really wonderful Neighbours redemption story" and that her departure means that she has "found genuine friendships and loyalties along with her own life and her own career." Of Naomi's new job, O'Reilly explained that it would give the character a "real sense of self and independence that she hasn't had before. She's working in her dream job where she gets to be the boss and not the assistant!" O'Reilly told a writer from 10Play that she enjoyed working with Mann, Milligan, McGregor, Bonner, Dennis, Morey and Moloney the most and that a word to sum up her time on the serial was "good" as "the fast pace at Neighbours really helps you hone in on[sic] your process and make something happen. It makes you good and screen fit."

=== Returns ===
On 27 April 2020, it was confirmed O'Reilly had reprised the role and she returned on 7 May. Naomi comes back to Erinsborough to support her mother following Gary's death. O'Reilly told Sarah Ellis of Inside Soap that Kyle contacts Naomi when he becomes worried about Sheila's state of mind, as she has started talking to a bird. The actress said that coincidentally Naomi is having some trouble in Los Angeles, where she has been living and working, so she takes it as a sign to leave and return to Erinsborough. She also told Ellis, "On one hand, it's food for the soul to be back with her family. But on the other hand, Naomi is facing the past, and everyone has their opinion about her. She knows she has to work extra hard to prove she's a new person."

Sheila is initially overjoyed to see her daughter, until she realises that Naomi is back to talk sense into her. Naomi also notices the tension between Sheila and Susan, and realises that getting them talking could help Sheila move on. O'Reilly commented that Naomi "feels deeply for her mum, but also wants to push her to kick start her life again". Naomi locks both women in the Willis house, giving them a chance to talk and let down their guard. The character was also revealed to have a connection to series regular Pierce Greyson (Tim Robards). O'Reilly said that Naomi and Pierce "have a shared wild past" from their time in Sydney, and she is still attracted to him.

O'Reilly made a cameo appearance as Naomi for the serial's then finale, broadcast on 28 July 2022. Naomi appears in a video message sent to Toadie, congratulating him on his wedding to Melanie Pearson (Lucinda Cowden).

== Reception ==
"She may be the baddest girl in Erinsborough, but we can't help but love Naomi Canning. She's smart, sassy and sexy, yet still gets in trouble with her bossy mum Sheila – and underneath it all, she just wants to find a decent man to love her."

— Sarah Ellis of Inside Soap on Naomi.

Naomi and her storylines received mostly positive attention from critics. Ahead of Naomi's on-screen introduction, Rebecca Lake of TV Week said it was about time the show got "a new vixen" and thought she looked like quite a "sexy character". Kilkelly believed Naomi was "bound to stir up trouble" following her arrival. Ben Pobjie from The Sydney Morning Herald commented that Naomi acted like "an idiot" during the painting storyline, while a reporter for What's on TV branded the character "Naughty Naomi" and thought she got "the slap she so richly deserved from Sonya" after she kissed Toadie. O'Reilly's co-star Eve Morey observed, "Naomi is a femme fatale. She's opportunistic and manipulative."

Bridget Jones from New Idea stated that Naomi was "sweet-at-heart". In August 2014, Inside Soap's Michael Cregan expressed his love for the character, commenting "We love Neighbours' Naomi and her flirty ways." Cregan also thought the storyline involving Josh was "saucy stuff". While Stephen Downie from TV Week quipped, "The romance between Josh and Naomi has a use-by date but, much like the couple, we're willing to enjoy this ride while it lasts." Claire Crick from All About Soap praised the couple, even though she thought they were complete opposites. Crick also loved their "hilarious secret hook-ups". O'Reilly was concerned about how her character would be received by viewers, especially when she went after Toadie, but she was pleased with the positive reaction to Naomi.

"The unlucky-in-love event planner was always effortlessly entertaining and one of the few characters to be both a consistent source of drama and comedy, though the latter came largely from the increasingly large folders she was given to hold as the show tried to disguise O'Reilly's real-life pregnancy."

— Ethan Sills of The Spin Off on Naomi.

Guest writer Ethan Sills from The Spin Off called Naomi "one of the best characters the show has produced in recent years" and said that O'Reilly played the character to "perfection". Sills said that Naomi would be the only one of six departing characters in 2015 who he will "mourn the loss of". In 2015, Kerry Barrett from All About Soap placed Naomi at number 29 on the magazine's list of 30 favourite Neighbours characters. Barrett quipped "Spoilt, bratty, kooky, sexy Naomi hasn't been in Ramsay Street for long, but she's definitely made her mark!". Barrett thought Naomi's best moment was "getting jiggy with Josh in a lift!" A reporter for The New Zealand Herald stated "business savvy, attention commanding, bossy; Naomi was a woman who knew what she wanted and always put herself first." Laura Denby said that Naomi's feature in the serial's finale "was a delight" due to her popularity as a character.

During a feature on what storylines were working and not working for the show, a Soap World columnist praised the character, saying "Naomi Canning has been perhaps the best new character of the last few years. Her cougar/cub sex fling with Josh is pure hotness and tends towards the controversial, thus providing good watercooler moments for fans." The columnist also enjoyed Naomi's feud with her mother, as it led to some strong scenes between the two women. However, they criticised Naomi's attempts to seduce Toadie, believing that it was not well executed and for a character "designed to be a husband-stealing minx" her pursuit was "tepid at best". During his review of the show in 2014, Kilkelly praised O'Reilly's addition to the cast, saying "Naomi has also been a breath of fresh air as a character who will push the boundaries just that little bit more than many of her neighbours!"

After her brief 2022 return, Laura Denby from Radio Times called Naomi a "popular character" and called her cameo "a delight".
