= Harley Bonner =

Australian actor (born 1991)

- Born: 27 April 1991 (age 35); Melbourne, Victoria, Australia
- Occupation: Actor
- Years active: 2012–present
- Spouse: Natalie Roser (m. 2022)
- Children: 1
- Mother: Carla Bonner

Harley Bonner (born 27 April 1991) is an Australian actor known for his roles as Josh Willis on Neighbours (2013–2016) and Logan Bennett on Home and Away (2021–2022).

== Early life ==
Bonner was born in Melbourne and lived in Belgrave, Victoria. He is the son of actress Carla Bonner and has a younger brother.

== Career ==
Bonner had a guest role in House Husbands in 2012 and appeared in the documentary series Creative Kids in 2014. He joined the cast of Neighbours as Josh Willis in 2013. He admitted that when he started acting, he did not want to appear in Neighbours, as his mother had played Stephanie Scully in the show for 11 years and he did not want "a free ride" because of that. In August 2018, Bonner appeared in an episode of True Story with Hamish & Andy playing the lead role of Stephen in "Stephen's Meet The Parents Story".

In March 2021, Bonner joined the cast of Home and Away as Dr. Logan Bennett. He made his debut in August 2021. On 8 January 2022, it was announced that Bonner had left the serial and would not return to set when filming resumes, as he had not received a COVID-19 vaccine; Seven Network requires all staff working on their productions to be vaccinated. Bonner's last scenes as Logan aired on 6 June 2022. Bonner wrote, co-directed and starred in the short film Rise & Fall, which was co-produced by fellow Neighbours actor Taylor Glockner.

== Personal life ==
Bonner was previously in a relationship with his Neighbours co-star Ariel Kaplan, who played his on-screen sister. Bonner has been in a relationship with model Natalie Roser since 2017. They announced their engagement in November 2021, and married on 18 February 2022 at the Krinklewood Estate in New South Wales. On 16 February 2025, Bonner and Roser confirmed they had welcomed their first child, a daughter, Aurelia Mae Rose Bonner, on 14 February.

== Filmography ==
Year	Title	Role	Notes
2012	House Husbands	Adam	Episode: "Phoebe Arrives"
2013–2016	Neighbours	Josh Willis	Main cast: 672 Episodes
2014	Creative Kids	Guest	Episode: "How to be an Actor"
2018	True Story with Hamish & Andy	Stephen	Episode: "Stephen's Meet The Parents Story"
2021	The Quirky Best Friend	Samuel	Short film
2021–2022	Home and Away	Dr. Logan Bennett	Main cast: 84 Episodes
2024	Rise & Fall	Stoner #2	Short film
