= Meyne Wyatt =

Australian actor (born 1989)

- Born: 1989 (age 36–37); Kalgoorlie, Western Australia, Australia
- Education: Hale School; National Institute of Dramatic Art (BFA)
- Occupation: Actor
- Years active: 2010–present
- Known for: Neighbours; Redfern Now

Meyne Wyatt (born 1989) is an Aboriginal Australian actor. He has appeared in short films, feature films, telemovies, and television series, and has also written for television.

== Early life ==
Meyne Wyatt was born in Kalgoorlie in 1989, to Sue, a painter and children's book illustrator, and Brian, who worked for the National Native Title Council. His father was a Yamatji man, while his mother is from the Wongatha group, and Wyatt is the youngest of four siblings. He attended Hale School in Perth from the age of 13.

After leaving Hale, Wyatt completed a theatre course at the Western Australian Academy of Performing Arts (WAAPA). He auditioned for full-time places at WAAPA and the National Institute of Dramatic Art (NIDA), and was accepted into both. He decided to attend NIDA and graduated in 2010.

== Career ==
Following his graduation from NIDA, Wyatt appeared in several theatre productions in Sydney, Adelaide and Brisbane. He won the Best Newcomer accolade at the 2011 Sydney Theatre Awards for his performance as an Aboriginal teenager in Lachlan Philpott's production of Silent Disco. In 2012, Wyatt was cast in the supporting role of Jimmy Middleton in the musical comedy film The Sapphires. He also made his debut with the Bell Shakespeare company, in a production of The School for Wives.

In early 2013, Wyatt starred in the lead role of Ralph Meyers's production of Peter Pan at the New Victory Theater. In that same year, Wyatt filmed a supporting role in The Broken Shore, a television miniseries based on Peter Temple's 2005 novel of the same name. He also appeared in the film adaptation of Tim Winton's short story collection The Turning. Wyatt played Frank Leaper, a footballer "who walks away at a key moment of his career", in the segment titled Family, which was directed by Shaun Gladwell.

Wyatt appeared in the second season of Redfern Now as a father whose newborn baby goes missing. He was initially cast in the first season of the drama, but had to drop out due to a scheduling conflict. His performance earned him nominations at the 2014 Logie Awards and at the 3rd AACTA Awards.

In 2014, Wyatt also appeared in the cast of feature film Strangerland, alongside Nicole Kidman and Joseph Fiennes. On 20 July 2014, it was announced that he had joined the cast of long-running soap opera Neighbours, as Nate Kinski. Wyatt is the first Indigenous actor to join the main cast since the show began in 1985. Executive producer Jason Herbison stated the decision to cast an Indigenous actor was "unintentional" and that Wyatt had been the best actor for the role. Wyatt relocated to Melbourne for filming and made his screen debut as Nate on 18 August 2014. Wyatt began appearing in the six-part sketch-comedy show Black Comedy in November 2014.

Wyatt took a break from Neighbours to appear in a Sydney Theatre Company production of King Lear, alongside Geoffrey Rush, from November 2015 to January 2016. Wyatt's father died from throat cancer in October, causing him to miss the first two weeks of rehearsals. The director, Neil Armfield, briefly considered recasting the role of Edmund, as he was concerned that Wyatt would find it hard to play a man who plots to murder his father. However, Wyatt found the play "a good distraction". He also appeared in the feature film What If It Works?.

Wyatt left Neighbours in early 2016 and his character's last scenes aired in June that year. In 2017, Wyatt appeared in the American series The Leftovers, which was filmed in Australia. In 2018, he had a regular role in drama series Mystery Road, as Cedric Thompson.

Wyatt's first play, City of Gold, was published in July 2019 by Currency Press. A co-production between Queensland Theatre and Griffin Theatre, the play premiered in Brisbane, before transferring to Sydney.

In 2021, Wyatt joined Shareena Clanton, Sachin Joab and Remy Hii in bringing to light racism on the set of Neighbours. He reported several instances of racism, including "the 'c' word", and hearing multiple instances of homophobia.

Wyatt starred in the 2021 ABC television comedy series Preppers. He also appeared in 2024 horror film The Moogai and in the comedy drama series Strife.

On 17 April 2025, Wyatt was named as part of the extended cast for season two of Return to Paradise.

== Other activities ==
In June 2020, Wyatt delivered a powerful four-minute monologue from his play City of Gold, on a special episode on ABC Television's Q+A about Black Lives Matter and Aboriginal deaths in custody. In the monologue, he describes the impact of racism on his life. It was widely covered by national media. Comedian Nazeem Hussain suggested in a tweet that it was "the best two minutes of Australian television ever".

In 2020, encouraged by his mother, Wyatt entered a painted self-portrait in the Archibald Prize and became the first Indigenous artist to win the Packing Room Prize in September 2020.

Wyatt co-authored a children's book, Maku, with Randa Abdel-Fattah, published in 2022.

== Awards and nominations ==
Year	Work	Award	Category	Result	Ref.
2011	Silent Disco	Sydney Theatre Awards	Best Newcomer	Won	
2014	Redfern Now	Logie Awards	Most Outstanding Newcomer	Nominated	
2014	Redfern Now	AACTA Awards	Best Lead Actor in a Television Drama	Nominated	
2020	Meyne Wyatt	National Dreamtime Awards	Actor of the Year	Finalist	
2020	City of Gold	Sydney Theatre Awards	Best Male Actor in a Leading Role in a Mainstage Production	Won	
2020	City of Gold	Sydney Theatre Awards	Best New Australian Work	Nominated	
2020	City of Gold	Victorian Premier's Literary Awards	Victorian Premier's Prize for Drama	Shortlisted	
2020	Self portrait	Archibald Prize	Packing Room Prize	Won	
2024	Maku	DANZ Children's Book Award	Best Chapter Book	Won	

== Acting credits ==
=== Television ===
Year	Title	Role	Notes	Ref.
2013	The Broken Shore	Donny Coulter	Miniseries	
2013	Redfern Now	Justin Myles	Episode: "Babe in Arms"	
2014–2016	Neighbours	Nate Kinski	426 episodes	
2014–2018	Black Comedy	Guest	9 episodes	
2017	The Leftovers	Rowan	1 episode	
2018	Mystery Road	Cedric Thompson	6 episodes	
2019	Les Norton	Percy Kirby	1 episode	
2019	Wentworth	Anton	2 episodes	
2021	The Moth Effect	Milo	1 episode	
2021	Preppers	Guy	6 episodes	
2023	Strife	Robert	5 episodes	
2025	Return to Paradise	Scott Forbes	Episode: "Death Trip"	

=== Film ===
Year	Title	Role	Notes	Ref.
2012	The Sapphires	Jimmy Middleton		
2013	The Turning	Frank Leaper		
2014	The Night Sky	Narrator	Short film	
2015	Strangerland	Burtie		
2016	Exhale	Chaz	Short film	
2017	What If It Works?	Drew		
2018	The Obscure	Raleigh	Short film	
2018	The Nightingale	Voice artist		
2018	Reaching Distance	Zach		
2020	The Moogai	Fergus	Short film	
2022	We Are Still Here	Michael		
2022	Fences	Adam/A2	Short film	
2024	The Moogai	Fergus	Feature film	

=== Stage ===
Year	Title	Role	Notes	Ref.
2011	The Brothers Size	Oshoosi Size	Stables Theatre, Sydney with Griffin Theatre Co	
2011	Silent Disco	Squid	Stables Theatre, Sydney, Butter Factory Theatre, Wodonga with HotHouse Theatre, Griffin Theatre Co & ATYP	
2011–2012	Bloodland	Gulami	Wharf Theatre, Sydney, Dunstan Playhouse, Adelaide, QPAC, Brisbane with STC, Adelaide Festival, Queensland Theatre, & Bangarra Dance Theatre	
2012	The School for Wives		Australian tour with Bell Shakespeare	
2012	Buried City	Meynedog	Belvoir Theatre, Sydney	
2013	Peter Pan	Peter Pan	Belvoir Theatre, Sydney	
2015–2016	King Lear	Edmund	Sydney Theatre Company	
2019	City of Gold		Bille Brown Theatre, Brisbane, Stables Theatre, Sydney	
2022	City of Gold		Wharf Theatre, Sydney with STC	
2026	Redfern Renaissance		Belvoir Theatre, Sydney	

=== As writer ===
Year	Title	Role	Notes	Ref.
2012	Buried City	Devisor	Belvoir Theatre, Sydney	
2019; 2022	City of Gold	Playwright	Bille Brown Theatre, Brisbane, Stables Theatre, Sydney, Wharf Theatre, Sydney with STC	
2022	Heartbreak High	Writer	Episode 4	
2023	Total Control	Writer	Season 3, episode 4	
