= Tyler Brennan =

Fictional character from Neighbours

- Neighbours character
- Portrayed by: Travis Burns
- Duration: 2015–2019
- First appearance: 6 February 2015
- Last appearance: 3 April 2019
- Introduced by: Jason Herbison
- Spin-off appearances: Pipe Up (2016); Summer Stories (2016); Neighbours vs Time Travel (2017)
In-universe information
- Occupation: Mechanic; Barman
- Father: Hamish Roche
- Mother: Fay Brennan
- Adoptive father: Russell Brennan
- Half-brothers: Mark Brennan; Aaron Brennan; Cassius Grady
- Half-sisters: Chloe Brennan

Tyler Brennan is a fictional character from the Australian television soap opera Neighbours, played by Travis Burns. The actor was asked to audition for the role in 2014, while he was working in the United States. After winning the role, Burns relocated to Australia. Neighbours marks Burns' first Australian television acting job. He made his first screen appearance during the episode broadcast on 6 February 2015. Burns left the cast in late 2017, and Tyler made his on-screen departure on 27 February 2018. He made a brief return from 16 October 2018, and again on 3 April 2019.

Tyler was introduced as the younger brother of established character Mark Brennan (Scott McGregor). He is portrayed as an impulsive, cocky "badboy-with-a-heart". Burns said that Tyler was untidy and relaxed, which was the exact opposite of Mark. Tyler had a short-lived romance with Imogen Willis (Ariel Kaplan), before switching his attentions to her half-sister Paige Smith (Olympia Valance). One of the character's first story arcs focused on his involvement with Dennis Dimato's (David Serafin) stolen car ring. Tyler eventually realises that he is in too deep and makes a confession to Mark, which results in his arrest.

Tyler and Mark's brother Aaron Brennan (Matt Wilson) and father Russell Brennan (Russell Kiefel) were introduced in 2015. Russell's introduction marked the start of a "controversial" domestic violence storyline, as it emerged that he had abused Tyler when he was younger. The following year, producers paired Tyler with Imogen and Paige's younger sister Piper Willis (Mavournee Hazel), whose parents oppose the relationship due to the age difference between them. The relationship lasts until Tyler's departure in 2018, but Burns later reprised his role to help facilitate Piper's exit from the serial, which saw the couple reunite.

== Casting ==
On 30 October 2014, the serial's official website announced that actor and model Travis Burns had been cast as Tyler Brennan, the younger brother of established character Mark Brennan (Scott McGregor). Burns was working in the United States when he was asked to audition for the part in early 2014. After securing the role, Burns relocated back to Australia. Of his casting, he said "When you score a role on a show as iconic as Neighbours, you don't say no. It's especially cool to be joining the show in its 30th-anniversary year. I feel like I've arrived at the perfect time." Neighbours marks Burns' first Australian television acting job, following his on-screen debut in The CW series SAF3. Burns had previously met McGregor through their modelling agency and believed that they had developed a "brotherly spark" through that connection, which he felt helped him secure the role. He also believed the role was meant to be his as his young nephew is also named Tyler. Matt Wilson also auditioned for the role of Tyler, before he was cast as Tyler's brother, Aaron Brennan. Burns made his screen debut as Tyler on 6 February 2015.

== Development ==
=== Characterisation and introduction ===
Tyler is a mechanic and the youngest of four siblings. Tyler's profile on the official Neighbours website billed him as "cheeky, charming and cocky". While Melissa Field from TV Week Soap Extra described him as a "badboy-with-a-heart", a "ladies' man" and a "troublesome little brother". Tyler is also impulsive and suffers from "a short attention span". Burns explained that Tyler was the exact opposite of his older brother Mark, branding Tyler untidy, relaxed and "a go-with-the-flow type of guy". In August 2015, Burns told TV Soap's Tim Falk that Tyler's storylines had allowed him to explore many different sides of the character. He explained "I feel that Tyler has not only changed but he has definitely grown from his experiences while living on Ramsay Street. I think he can be quite misunderstood, so it's been nice to watch different layers of him unfold." Tyler has long hair, which he often wears in a man bun. Burns had been growing his hair long for a year prior to securing the role of Tyler, and the producers decided to keep it for the character. Burns noted that it is "a point of difference" for his character.

After attending a toga party at the local university, Tyler came across a hungover Imogen Willis (Ariel Kaplan) and carried her to his motorbike. Burns commented that "sparks fly" between them. Tyler brought Imogen home to Ramsay Street and she hit her head, after falling from the bike. Imogen's state caused her friend Daniel Robinson (Tim Phillipps) to believe that Tyler had taken advantage of her. Daniel confronted Tyler and when it escalated, Tyler was taken into police custody. Tyler then had the station call his brother, who was "not overly impressed" at having to bail him out. Burns admitted that the brothers had a complicated relationship and had not been in touch with each other for a long time. Tyler moved in with Mark and asked him for a job at the garage. Mark was not happy with the idea and Burns explained, "He knows Tyler never finishes anything he starts! But after reconsidering, he decides to give Tyler a second chance for once, and puts in a good word for him." Burns added that Mark wanted to see if Tyler would prove him wrong.

=== Relationships ===
==== Imogen Willis ====
After settling in, Tyler asked Imogen to spend some time with him. She agreed, but had no intention of pursuing a relationship with him due to her feelings for Daniel. However, Imogen's sister Paige Smith (Olympia Valance), believed that there could be something more between them and invited them both to a pool party. Imogen tried to make it clear that Tyler was more suited to Paige. But after Paige encouraged Tyler to get to know Imogen better, they bonded. Tyler's crush on Imogen faded when he realised she was in love with Daniel. Valance observed "Imogen's too smart for him. That whole thing was Imogen trying to distract herself from her love for Daniel." A couple of months later, Tyler proved to be "a welcome distraction" for Imogen at a law society meeting. They went on to play a game of strip poker at the Men's Shed, while flirting heavily with each other. Tyler later convinced Imogen to "embrace her wilder side" and when he asked her on a date, she took him paintballing. After returning to Tyler's house, they ended up kissing and Tyler tried to take things further, but Imogen panicked and left.

Imogen and Tyler's flirtation eventually developed into a romance and Imogen decided to lose her virginity to him. Kaplan explained that Imogen believed having sex with Tyler would help her to move on from her feelings for Daniel. Her peers were all in relationships and she thought she should be in one too. Kaplan continued, "Tyler is fun, there's nothing offensive about him, and he's probably the distraction she needs at this time." Imogen soon began having doubts about the relationship. When she and Tyler were together in his bedroom, she admitted to him that she was still in love with Daniel. Kaplan said that Imogen realised that she would be losing her virginity to Tyler for all the wrong reasons, and did not want to regret it. Imogen then fled Tyler's house, leaving him alone and confused.

==== Paige Smith ====
After realising that Imogen did not reciprocate his feelings, Tyler switched his attentions to Paige, who had once dated his brother. She initially told him that she would not be his second choice, but when she learned that Mark had moved on with someone else, she changed her mind. Tyler thought Paige might be using him to get back at Mark, but Paige assured him that she was genuinely interested in him. After spending the day flirting, Tyler and Paige kissed, but during the moment Paige called out Mark's name. Paige and Tyler then decided to just be friends. When Paige and Tyler were forced to work together to pay off their debt to Michelle Kim (Ra Chapman), they became involved in a fake relationship to cover up their illegal activities. To try to get out of debt, Paige and Tyler tried to raise some money by taking part in a bikini car wash. After realising that they made a good team, Tyler made a romantic advance towards Paige, but she rebuffed him. However, Paige later changed her mind and returned to the garage with the intention of having sex with Tyler, but she discovered he had already moved on with a customer.

Valance thought Paige was better off with Tyler's brother, commenting "I think she needs someone with a bit more maturity – Paige and Tyler are a lethal combination." When Tyler and Paige became stuck in a well together, they gave into their feelings for each other and kissed. Tyler was pleased by the development in their relationship, but Paige later admitted to him that she still had feelings for Mark. Tyler was then forced to tell her that he just wanted to be friends. Burns said "Tyler would keep fighting for Paige, even if she was going out with his brother!" The actor believed that Tyler would respect the situation if Paige was with his brother, but he would secretly be trying to win her back, as he really liked her. Tyler later learned that Paige and Mark had decided to get back together and Burns commented that it hurt Tyler to see them as a couple, as he had felt a genuine connection with Paige.

==== Piper Willis ====
Tyler becomes friends with his neighbour, and Imogen and Paige's younger sister, Piper Willis (Mavournee Hazel). She begins to idolise him and soon develops romantic feelings for him. Burns told an Inside Soap writer that Tyler and Piper were both "young, free and spirited" and that Tyler was initially "oblivious" to how she felt about him. Tyler decides to let Piper down gently and is pleased with how he handled the situation, but he was unaware of how strong Piper's feelings were. When Piper encourages Tyler to attend a singles' night, he hopes that he will meet someone new, while Piper wants him for herself. As they return home, Tyler is "gobsmacked" when she initiates a kiss between them. Burns explained Tyler surprise: "It's fair to say that Tyler's shocked. There's a connection between them, but Tyler has never seen it in a romantic way. He's worried about the age difference, and then there's the fact that Piper's dad Brad (Kip Gamblin) is staying with the Brennans – so it could be awkward!"

=== Dennis Dimato ===
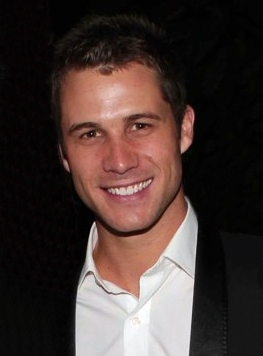
Tyler's brother Mark, played by Scott McGregor (pictured), ended up arresting him when he confessed to working for Dimato.

Tyler began working for businessman Dennis Dimato (David Serafin) to earn more money, but soon realised that the work he was carrying out was illegal when he was asked to strip Imogen's stolen car for parts. Dimato later called in a favour from Tyler, asking him to spy on Mark and the police investigation into his business. Tyler learned that Mark's sergeant did not think the case was worth pursuing, but Mark wanted to bring Dimato down on his own. When Matt Turner (Josef Brown) later saw Tyler and Dimato together, he warned Tyler to stay away from him. That same day, Paige caught Tyler checking out cars to steal and he was forced to tell her the truth about his job with Dimato. When Dimato and his associates started looking for a new base to continue their illegal car parts business, Tyler tried put them off buying the garage by telling that it had an uncertain future as the owner was selling it. However, Tyler realised he had made a mistake when Dimato decided to buy garage and pointed out that it provided Tyler with the perfect cover.

Both Tyler and Paige were later blackmailed into selling stolen car parts to pay off their debts to Dimato and his partner Michelle. When Tyler missed a meeting with Joey Dimato (Steven Sammut), who was leaving a stolen car at the garage, Paige's younger brother Bailey Turner (Calen Mackenzie) took the car. Michelle told Tyler to find the car or she would make him pay. But when she overheard Paige telling Tyler that she had reported the car to the police, Michelle ordered them both to pay her the money owed or get another car. A TV Soap columnist noted, "Tyler knows he's getting in way over his head, but he also knows it's far too late to back out". Michelle later blackmailed Paige into taking a job at the garage selling the stolen car parts.

Tyler and Paige tried to make the garage go legitimate by setting up car washes and automotive courses, but they were soon drawn back into Dimato's crime syndicate when Joey left them a bag of money and Michelle ordered them to make a drop-off. When they discovered that a community fundraiser was taking place near the drop-off point, they decided to leave the money in an old well and return for it later. However, they became stuck in the well when they realised that they could not surface with the money due to a large number of people nearby. Tyler and Paige later learned that there was $6000 missing from the bag and Tyler was "viciously beaten" when he asked for more time to find the money.

When Tyler realised that he was in "too deep" with Dimato, he eventually admitted his involvement to Mark, believing it was the right course of action. However it resulted in his arrest. Burns explained that Tyler believed that his confession would mean Mark would go easier on him, but "he's heartbroken when Mark arrests him – you don't expect that from your own brother!" When the police offered him a reduced sentence, Tyler agreed to become their informant and wore a wire to a meeting with Michelle. However, before he could get any incriminating evidence, the transmitter was damaged. Tyler then learned that Dimato was returning to town and he agreed to go undercover again. But Dimato got to him first and Tyler was forced to attend a meeting with Dimato and his associates.

=== Family and domestic violence ===
When Mark felt that Tyler had "gone off the rails", he invited their brother Aaron (Matt Wilson) to help, as he knew Aaron and Tyler were close. Wilson explained that it had been six years since the brothers had seen each other. He described Aaron as an opportunist like Tyler and said he often acted as a mediator between Tyler and Mark. Burns told Inside Soap's Sarah Ellis that Aaron's arrival changed the dynamic between Tyler and Mark. He continued, "One of us will always take the other's side and we end up teaming up against each other." Shortly after Aaron's arrival, Tyler tries to set him up with his friend Nate Kinski (Meyne Wyatt), but they quickly realise that they have nothing in common. Following Tyler's arrest, Aaron bails him out of jail. This makes Mark "furious", as he believes that they are teaming up against him. He then throws Tyler out of his house. Burns said Tyler initially believes Mark is joking, but he is forced to stay in the Men's Shed for a few nights. An Inside Soap reporter observed that Tyler and Mark's relationship was at "an all-time low".

The Brennan family was expanded again following the introduction of the brothers' father Russell (Russell Kiefel) in August 2015, and the family became the centre of "a controversial" domestic violence storyline. When Tyler saw his father on Ramsay Street, he packs up his belongings and leaves. Burns explained that Tyler initially feels "pain and fear" upon seeing his father and decides to avoid him, as he is worried that what happened between them would happen again. After leaving the street, Tyler stays at the Men's Shed. Karl finds him and Tyler opens up about the physical abuse he suffered at Russell's hands. Burns said, "Tyler feels he can trust Karl, so he opens up and tells him everything. The relationship between Tyler and Russell is obviously very damaged – but it's been great for me as an actor to be able to bring it to life on screen." Falk (TV Soap) observed that the abuse Tyler suffered had "a huge influence" on the type of man that he had become. Falk branded it "a compelling storyline" and said that it helped to explore the Brennan's complex family relationships.

When Tyler invites Karl's grandson Ben Kirk (Felix Mallard) to work on a bike, Russell also invites himself along. Burns told Alana Wulff of TV Week Soap Extra that Tyler is initially hesitant because of what happened between them in the past. However, he is surprised when he and Russell bond and play practical jokes on Ben. But when Ben gets his own back on Russell, he loses his temper and threatens them both, forcing Karl to step in. Tyler suffers flashbacks to his teenage years with his father. Burns said "When Tyler's alone with his dad, he fears the worst – that anything could go wrong at any second." Russell plans to purchase Fitzgerald Motors with Mark and Aaron's support. Tyler's lack of enthusiasm leads Russell to confront him. Tyler begs his father to apologise for the way he treated him when he was growing up, but Russell refuses. Tyler is "overcome" by his anger and he punches his father. Burns explained that Tyler stands up for himself, and to Russell, for the first time. Mark intervenes and Tyler reveals that their father used to beat him. Mark initially thinks that Tyler is lying, but he and Aaron soon learn the truth from Russell. They both feel that they have let their younger brother down. Russell finally apologises to Tyler, before he leaves town.

Producers planned for Kiefel to reprise his role as Russell Brennan, but when he died in November 2016, the storyline was changed. On-screen, the family are informed that Russell has died. Shortly after, Tyler learns that Russell is not his biological father. Tyler does not expect his real father to turn up in Erinsborough, but while he is playing pool at The Waterhole, an older man begins talking to him. The man, Hamish Roche (Sean Taylor), later turns up at the Brennans' house and introduces himself as Tyler's father. Burns commented that "it's a massive shock" for Tyler, who initially does not want anything to do with Hamish. Burns said he would tell his character to get to know Hamish, explaining "There's a huge void in Tyler's life because he never got to make amends with Russell before he died – and now he has chance to connect with Hamish." Hamish is the father Tyler's always wanted, as he is caring and interested in Tyler's life.

=== Departure and returns ===
In November 2017, Burns initially confirmed via social media that he was not leaving Neighbours in the near future. However, during the following month, Fiona Byrne of the Herald Sun reported that Burns was leaving the show to pursue other roles in United States. His departure was confirmed on 14 February 2018, and Tyler's exit scenes aired on 27 February.

On 8 October 2018, Kilkelly (Digital Spy) confirmed that the character would be returning on 16 October, following his release from prison, where he was serving a twenty year sentence for Hamish's murder. After Tyler's charges are downgraded to assault, he is reunited with his brothers and sister Chloe (April Rose Pengilly). He initially refuses to see Piper, but they eventually talk about everything that has happened. Burns filmed his scenes earlier in the year, and they helped to "tie up all of the loose ends" in Tyler's storylines. Burns made a brief appearance on 3 April 2019 for Piper's exit storyline.

== Storylines ==
Tyler takes a hungover Imogen Willis home and she cuts her head falling from his motorbike. Daniel Robinson and Paige Smith accuse Tyler of assaulting Imogen and they fight, causing them to be arrested. At the station, Tyler is reunited with his brother Mark. He moves in with Mark and gets a job at the local garage. Needing money to pay the rent, Tyler contemplates selling his bike, but is offered a job by Dennis Dimato. He is tasked with stripping Imogen's stolen car for parts, but he returns it anonymously, after agreeing to do a favour for Dimato. Tyler bonds with Imogen and he kisses Paige, but after she calls out his brother's name, they agree to be friends. Tyler steals a car for Dimato, but it is tracked by the police and Tyler is forced to hide while Dimato is arrested. Dimato purchases the garage to continue his operations and then flees the country. His partner Michelle Kim takes over his business and makes Tyler steal more cars. Imogen and Tyler go on a couple of dates, and Imogen decides to lose her virginity to him, but soon changes her mind.

Paige's brother Bailey takes one of the stolen cars and when it is reclaimed, Michelle demands Paige and Tyler get her $8,000 or another car. Michelle also blackmails Paige into working with Tyler at the garage. Tyler develops feelings for Paige, but she is still in love with Mark; however, when he catches them working late at night, they are forced to tell him they are dating. Paige and Tyler try to make the garage a legitimate business in order to pay off their debts. Joey Dimato leaves them a bag of money that needs to be dropped off. Not wanting to be caught with it, they throw it down a well and retrieve it later. They discover some of the money has been stolen and Tyler is beaten. He refuses to go to the hospital and Paige gets him some painkillers. He tells his brother that he came off his bike. Tyler becomes dependent on the painkillers and steals Karl Kennedy's prescription pad to get more, causing tension between him and Nate Kinski. Mark contacts their brother Aaron and asks him to visit, knowing that he and Tyler are close.

Karl discovers the missing prescriptions and Tyler confesses to taking them. He also admits to Mark that he has been working for Dimato. Mark arrests Tyler and asks him to leave the house. Nate persuades Karl to let Tyler stay with him. Tyler agrees to wear a wire and meet with Michelle, in return for the charges against him being dropped. When the wire is damaged, a second sting is organised, but Dimato returns and takes Tyler to a meeting at a warehouse. Tyler attempts to run away, but is quickly caught. Before he is harmed, Mark and the police arrive to arrest Dimato and his accomplices. Tyler attempts to tell Paige that he has feelings for her, but soon learns that she and Mark are back together. He befriends Karl's grandson Ben, but when Ben skips school to spend the day with him, Karl and Susan (Jackie Woodburne) tell Tyler to be more responsible. He decides to move home, but when he spots his father, Russell, in the street, he stays at the Men's Shed. Tyler then admits to Karl that Russell used to beat him. Russell eventually apologises to Tyler for his actions.

Tyler and Russell spend the day with Ben, and they bond when they play practical jokes on him. But when Russell loses his temper with Ben, Tyler is reminded of their past. Russell later goads Tyler and Tyler punches him. He then tells Mark about the abuse he endured when he was younger, and his brothers ask Russell to leave. Ben accidentally leaves the garage unlocked, leading to the theft of tools and Tyler's bike. Paige helps Tyler to find the stolen items and he kisses her, but Paige assures him that she loves his brother. Tyler helps Mark arrest the thief and he later meets the new owner of the garage Lucas Fitzgerald (Scott Major), who keeps him on as manager. Tyler is tasked with hiring another mechanic for the garage and he offers the job to Stephanie Scully (Carla Bonner). He later discovers Steph kidnapped Lucas' son while suffering from a psychotic break. Steph convinces him and Lucas she has changed and keeps her job. Tyler manipulates Paige and Mark into talking about having children, knowing Mark wants to be a father, but Paige is not ready. Aaron confronts him on his behaviour, realising he is trying to break them up. Tyler is trapped in a lift with Paige when a fire breaks out at Erinsborough High. He confesses his love for her, before passing out due to smoke inhalation. Paige gets Tyler breathing again and they are rescued by Mark. At the hospital, Tyler tells Paige that he plans to move on from her.

Tyler befriends Piper Willis (Mavournee Hazel) when she turns to him for advice. Piper develops a crush on Tyler and kisses him. He tells her nothing can happen, as she is too young for him. Piper's parents also warn him to stay away from her, after learning about the kiss. Imogen arranges a date with Tyler to get over Daniel. Piper admits that she has feelings for Tyler, but he tells her he would only bring her trouble and he begins dating Courtney Grixti (Emma Lane). They break up when Tyler feels that Courtney is trying to run his life. Imogen develops feelings for Tyler, so Tyler propositions her, as a ploy to get her to realise she wants to be with Daniel. Tyler confesses to the police that his interference with the Lassiter's boiler may have caused the explosion, but he is soon cleared as he did not touch the gas valve. Piper and Tyler grow closer and admit their feelings for each other. Tyler tells Piper that if they want to date, they need her parents' permission. Piper tells Tyler that Brad has given his blessing, and they agree to keep their relationship a secret, until Terese (Rebekah Elmaloglou) gives hers. However, when Terese learns Piper plans to have sex with Tyler on the night of the school formal, she bans them from attending the dance together. Tyler breaks up with Piper, and he and Paige soon start a casual relationship.

Tyler and Piper become close again when he takes her to the beach to celebrate her birthday. He later rejects a kiss from her, before deciding that they should be together. However, he soon learns that she spent the night with Angus Beaumont-Hannay (Jai Waetford). Piper later tells Tyler that she is done with him. He then takes Tim Collins's (Ben Anderson) car from the garage and crashes it. Simone Bader (Kahli Williams) offers to take the blame and Tyler agrees. He gives her $600 and lets her stay at the Men's Shed. He later tells Paige and Jack that he took the car and hands himself into the police. Tyler sells his half of the house to Mark to pay for the repairs to Tim's car. Tim asks Tyler to do a job for him in return for him not pressing charges, but Tyler refuses. He later learns Tim has changed his mind, as Piper has blackmailed him. Tyler and Piper reconcile at Brad and Lauren's wedding. Brad and Terese refuse to support the relationship, due to Piper's age. When Brad attacks Tyler, he and Piper drive off together. Mark and Ned find them at a motel in Glenrowan, and Tyler persuades Piper to return home. Tyler loses his job at the garage. Leo Tanaka (Tim Kano) invites him and Piper to move into his backpackers hostel. They struggle financially, until Tyler gets a job at a bar in the city. Weeks later, he is fired, but he manages to convince Lucas to give him his job back at the garage.

Tyler feels insecure when he sees Piper bonding with backpacker T-Bone (Des Flanagan) and later fights with him. Piper is injured after a ute crashes into the hostel and Tyler initially believes T-Bone was responsible. With Mishti Sharma's (Scarlet Vas) help, he finds T-Bone in the city and attacks him. Piper decides to return home while she recovers, while Tyler moves back in with his brothers. Their mother Fay Brennan (Zoe Bertram) comes to visit, and she apologises to Tyler for leaving him and his brothers with Russell and for the abuse he suffered. Fay later tells Tyler, Mark and Aaron that their father, Russell is seriously ill and wants to see them. However, before they set off for the airport, Fay learns that Russell has died. Mishti strikes Tyler with her car, leaving him with severe bruising. Shortly after returning from Russell's funeral, Sheila Canning (Colette Mann) tells Mark, Aaron and Tyler that one of them is not Russell's son. Fay then returns to explain that Tyler was born after she had an affair with Hamish Roche (Sean Taylor). Tyler struggles with the revelation. Hamish soon comes to Erinsborough to meet Tyler, who is encouraged to spend time with him by Mark. Hamish persuades Tyler and Aaron not to sell the boat they inherited from Russell, and asks Tyler to repair it.

Tyler is fired from the garage when a car engine falls on Amy Williams (Zoe Cramond). His relationship with Mark suffers when Mark is accused of hurting Hamish. He later breaks up with Piper when T-Bone returns to town and he thinks she is cheating on him. Hamish's body is later found in the Cannings' spa. Tyler admits to his brothers that he argued with Hamish about his recent actions and involvement in Russell's death. He then struck him with a garden gnome, but Hamish was alive when Tyler left him. Tyler reunites with Piper and supports her through her panic attacks, following an incident on the boat, in which she was pushed overboard. Tyler confesses to the police about hitting Hamish and he is charged with manslaughter, but the charge is later upgraded to murder. The Brennans agree to sell the boat to pay for Tyler's legal defence, and various Ramsay Street residents buy shares in it. Tyler is approached by Adrian Snyder (Michael Vice), who explains that he is there on behalf of Philip Banks, an inmate at the prison Tyler will be sent to, who will make Tyler's arrival easy, but only if he did something in return. Adrian asks Tyler to seduce Philip's wife, Verity (Simone Amman), to check that she is being unfaithful. Tyler goes through with the plan, but Verity knows that it is a trap as Philip has done it before. Verity tells Tyler that Mark was the police officer who had put her husband in prison.

Snyder later poisons Piper's cat, Clementine and Tyler agrees to do another job. Snyder asks him to cut out a hole in the bottom of a van, so Banks can escape prison. However, Tyler fails to carry out the job when he finds Aaron has collapsed at the gym. Snyder dumps broken glass in the swimming pool at the Brennans' house, leading to Ben cutting his foot. The night before Tyler's trial, Piper arranges for them to stay in a hotel in the city. She then persuades him to go on the run with her, and they change their appearances. After hearing the police are on their way to them, Tyler and Piper go up to the roof and Tyler realises that he can jump over to the next building. He tells Piper that he has to leave her behind, but she tries to follow him and ends up hanging from the edge of the building. Tyler and a detective save her, and they are both arrested. At his trial, Tyler pleads guilty to murder. The judge sentences him to 20 years imprisonment, with a non-parole period of ten years. When Piper visits him the following day, Tyler breaks up with her. After learning Banks is being released from solitary confinement, Tyler is persuaded to request a transfer and he says goodbye to his brothers, before being moved to a prison in Adelaide.

After months of no contact, Piper receives a letter from Tyler, declaring his continued love for her but encouraging her to move on. She begins dating Cassius Grady (Joe Davidson), but it later emerges that Cassius is Tyler's half-brother, and the true killer of their father Hamish. When Cassius confesses, Tyler is transferred back to Melbourne for a hearing and granted release from prison. Piper and Tyler contemplate their future, but she admits that she is still in love with Cassius. Tyler visits Cassius and unleashes his anger at his half-brother, accusing him of stealing months of his life; soon after, Cassius is attacked by a fellow prisoner and Piper asks whether Tyler organised the attack, which he denies. Piper later apologises to Tyler and they kiss. But he tells her that too much has happened and he is not the same person anymore. Tyler decides to move to Adelaide for a fresh start. Months later, Piper turns up on Tyler's doorstep after leaving Erinsborough, and they resume their relationship.

== Reception ==
The character has received a positive reception from television critics for being aesthetically pleasing. During his first appearance, a Coventry Evening Telegraph reporter branded Tyler "an attractive stranger". A TV Week columnist called the character "hunky" and observed "everyone loves good Neighbours, especially one as hot as this newcomer!" Another contributor to the publication called Tyler the "new resident hottie". While an Inside Soap columnist labelled him "troublesome". Their colleague Michael Cregan praised the character, saying "imagine how thrilled we were to hear that there's another hunky Brennan brother in town. Happily for us, it looks as if Tyler shares the family aversion to clothes!"

Another Inside Soap columnist dubbed Tyler "eye candy for the slightly younger lady" and thought his "womanising ways" could cause trouble. A reporter for the Sunday Mail branded Tyler a "loveable tearaway", and quipped "as one might expect, Tyler shilling for the cops in an attempt to nab Dimato has not gone down well." During a feature on the Brennan brothers, Claire Crick from All About Soap commented "if you prefer the bad-boy vibe and like to be kept on your toes, Tyler's definitely your perfect match".
