= Imogen Willis =

Fictional character from the Australian soap opera Neighbours

- Neighbours character
- Portrayed by: Ariel Kaplan
- Duration: 2013–2016, 2019, 2023
- First appearance: 20 May 2013
- Last appearance: 16 November 2023
- Introduced by: Richard Jasek (2013); Jason Herbison (2019)
- Spin-off appearances: Pipe Up (2016)
In-universe information
- Occupation: Student; Garden nursery worker; Law firm assistant; Lawyer
- Family: Willis; Robinson; Ramsay
- Father: Brad Willis
- Mother: Terese Willis
- Brothers: Josh Willis
- Sisters: Piper Willis
- Half-brothers: Ned Willis
- Half-sisters: Paige Smith
- Husband: Daniel Robinson (2016–)
- Grandfathers: Doug Willis
- Grandmothers: Pam Willis
- Uncles: Nick Petrides
- Nephews: Gabriel Smith
- Nieces: Matilda Turner
- First cousins: Roxy Willis

Imogen Willis is a fictional character from the Australian soap opera Neighbours, played by Ariel Kaplan. The actor was cast in the role after a quick process, in which she auditioned once and attended a screen test. She began filming her first scenes in early February 2013. Kaplan's character and her family were created and introduced to Neighbours, as part of an ongoing overhaul of the show's cast and renewed focus on family units within the show. She made her first screen appearance during "Episode 6646", which was broadcast on 20 May 2013. Kaplan returned in the first episode of the 2023 Neighbours revival.

Imogen is portrayed as being "intelligent", "creative" and "confident". Kaplan thought her character was a good role model for female viewers because she does not feel she has to impress anyone. Imogen initially tried to hide her insecurities and resentment at being sidelined by her family due to her brother's swimming career. Due to a lack of attention, Imogen developed bulimia nervosa. The storyline was the first to portray the issues of eating disorders in Neighbours for six years. Both Kaplan and the producers worked closely with the Butterfly Foundation during their research.

The character's other storylines have often revolved around her romantic relationships with Mason Turner (Taylor Glockner), Tyler Brennan (Travis Burns), and Daniel Robinson (Tim Phillipps), whom she married before leaving for a job opportunity in the United States on 26 April 2016. Kaplan reprised the role three years later, and returned on 22 March 2019. Imogen helps run Toadfish Rebecchi's (Ryan Moloney) law firm and becomes Finn Kelly's (Rob Mills) defence lawyer, which causes conflict with her family and neighbours.

== Creation and casting ==
On 7 February 2013, it was announced that the four-strong Willis family would be introduced to Neighbours, as part of an ongoing overhaul of the show's cast and renewed focus on family units. News of the Willis family's introduction came shortly after producers decided to also bring in the five-strong Turner family. Executive producer Richard Jasek commented "As viewers will find out shortly, the Turners are a family of secrets, and the unique backstory of the Willis family is just as compelling." The character of Brad Willis (Kip Gamblin) was reintroduced to the show, along with his wife Terese (Rebekah Elmaloglou) and two children Josh (Harley Bonner) and Imogen.

Actor Ariel Kaplan was cast as Josh's twin sister Imogen following an audition process. Kaplan called the process one of the quickest that she had attended. She auditioned once and was then asked to do a screen test with Bonner, Elmaloglou, and Gamblin to see if they had the right "family dynamic". Kaplan said that she and the other actors bonded well and a few days later, while she was studying at the 16th Street Actors Studio, her agent called to tell her she had won the role. She and the other actors began filming their first scenes two weeks after the family's casting announcement. Growing up in South Africa, Kaplan had never seen Neighbours prior to filming and learnt about the street with her character. Kaplan made her first screen appearance as Imogen on 20 May 2013.

== Development ==
=== Characterisation ===
Imogen has been described as being "beautiful, intelligent and creative" by a writer for the serial's website. They asserted that Imogen often hid her insecurities from her family and resented the fact that she was sidelined because of Josh's swimming career. Comparing the two siblings, Gamblin said Imogen was definitely not sporty like Josh. He called her academic, nerdy and quirky. He later stated that Imogen had always been the "easier" child to parent, as she is "an A-grade student, she's intelligent, she's smart". Kaplan believed Imogen was a good role model for younger female viewers, saying "I love the character, she is outwardly confident and very comfortable in her own skin, and doesn't feel she has to impress anyone by doing things she might regret." Bonner observed that Josh and Imogen had a "love-hate" relationship, explaining "It's never that intense that we hate each other, but Imogen really likes to niggle him and tell him how things should be done."

Imogen befriended Amber Turner (Jenna Rosenow) shortly after her arrival. Rosenow liked having another actress playing a 16-year-old girl on-set, and said that it helped her and Kaplan to get back into the "teenage stage". A few months after her introduction, Kaplan decided to change her image and had her long hair cut short. The Neighbours wardrobe department took the opportunity to freshen up Imogen's style, as Kaplan's long hair had often covered up Imogen's outfits. Imogen was given a more edgy look and Kaplan commented that the wardrobe team were also working on a monochrome look for the character. In November 2013, Bonner thought that the revelation of Imogen's eating disorder had changed the Willis family dynamic. He also believed that Imogen was not neglected because the family wanted to help Josh achieve his goal. He continued "If Imogen had the goal, they would be putting in just as much effort with her. It wasn't neglect."

In late 2014, Imogen began causing "a bit more drama", which led to viewers asking for her to go back to her old self. Kaplan liked that Imogen's storylines had caused such a reaction, saying it was better than having no comments at all. She did not think Imogen needed to stay likeable as it could become boring. She said "The important thing is that viewers like watching her and she isn't always going to be the nice girl next door." Kaplan also said viewers would see "a sisterly bond" form between Imogen and her long-lost sister Paige Smith (Olympia Valance). Despite their different personalities, they would "have each other's back."

=== Eating disorder ===
A few months after her arrival on-screen, it emerged that Imogen was suffering from bulimia nervosa, an eating disorder that is characterised by binge eating and purging. Imogen's storyline was the first to portray the issues of eating disorders in the show for six years, with the last one featuring male character Ringo Brown (Sam Clark). Kaplan was told about the storyline a couple of months ahead of filming and in order to do it justice, she began researching the condition. She commented "It's such an important issue that people are dealing with more and more these days. I contacted an organisation over here called the Butterfly Foundation, which is a support network for people with eating disorders. They helped with the scripts and gave me plenty of information." Kaplan thought it was an honour to be given the storyline. The producers also worked closely with the Butterfly Foundation to develop the scripts and made sure they portrayed an accurate representation of the condition. The foundation's CEO, Christine Morgan, stated that they were "grateful" for the way the producers developed the storyline and hoped it would increase awareness of eating disorders.

Kaplan explained that Imogen had been keeping her eating disorder a secret from her family and that it stemmed from a lack of attention, as she was often overshadowed by her brother's swimming career. Imogen school principal Susan Kennedy (Jackie Woodburne) was the one who first noticed Imogen's condition, after seeing the family dynamic and how "disregarded" Imogen was. When Susan realised that Imogen had eaten a whole box of cupcakes, she recognised the signs and tried to find out if Imogen had an eating disorder. Although Imogen denied she had a problem with food, Susan became more suspicious. Once Imogen was alone, she began binge eating. Kaplan told Jackie Brygel from TV Week, "Imogen is a smart girl, so she's scared to be seen as vulnerable and weak. Having an eating disorder scares her. So, the immediate reaction is to deny it. It's a defence mechanism." The actress pointed out that for Imogen, it was not "a superficial thing", but actually about control.

The truth about Imogen's eating disorder was revealed when her father found her collapsed in the garden and coughing up blood. After she was rushed to the hospital, Imogen's parents were informed that she had a ruptured oesophagus, caused by excessive vomiting. Doctor Karl Kennedy (Alan Fletcher) then informed them that Imogen had bulimia. Kaplan said it was hard for Imogen to accept that her secret was out and her parents' reaction was just added pressure. Trying to help Imogen, Terese opened up to her about the eating disorder she suffered as a teenager. Kaplan called the moment "really powerful" and thought it would bring Imogen and Terese closer together, as well as help Imogen to come to terms with her own condition.

=== Relationships ===
==== Mason Turner ====
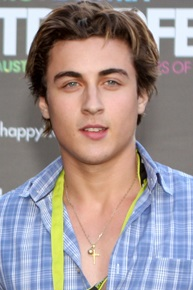
Mason Turner, played by Taylor Glockner (pictured), was Imogen's first love interest.

Imogen briefly dated her neighbour Mason Turner (Taylor Glockner), following the end of his relationship with her teacher Kate Ramsay (Ashleigh Brewer). Imogen used her fledgling romance with Mason to get her family to notice her. She tried to "stir up some controversy" by kissing Mason in front of her mother, who did not notice them. However, they were spotted by Josh instead, who tried to warn Mason off. While Imogen ignored her brother's disapproval of her relationship, she quickly realised Mason still had feelings for Kate and not wanting to be second best, Imogen ended their brief romance. Glockner said Imogen was just a distraction for Mason and even though he thought she was "a pretty cool girl" and very self-assured, he was not over Kate. A few months later, Imogen continued to harbour a crush on Mason and her friend, Amber (Jenna Rosenow), encouraged her to tell him. Kaplan explained that Imogen was not one to show her vulnerability, but she got the courage to open up to Mason about her feelings for him.

Before she could speak with Mason, Imogen caught him kissing Rhiannon Bates (Teressa Liane). Kaplan said "Imogen is heartbroken. She feels as if she is always an afterthought to Mason. It makes her feel like she's never good enough." After having her confidence knocked, Imogen skipped her counselling session and considered binge eating. Kaplan commented that binging seemed like the only option to Imogen when she felt inadequate. In January 2014, Isaac Woods (Josh Burton), a new love interest for Imogen, was introduced to the show. Isaac was "handsome, charming and a university law student". Kaplan stated that Imogen liked Isaac because he was older and made her feel more mature. They were both "a bit nerdy" and had an interest in the law. While Isaac and Imogen bonded over shared interests, they were spotted by a jealous Mason at the lake.

Mason told Isaac that Imogen was still in high school, something that she had been keeping quiet. However, Isaac was not bothered by Imogen's age, causing Mason to confess to Imogen that he wanted to be with her. Imogen was "deeply flattered" by Mason's declaration, but was wary about reuniting with him. Kaplan commented "Imogen's incredibly happy that he feels this way, but she's also scared because she feels Kate will always be in the background." Mason tried to win Imogen over by appearing more intellectual, which Kaplan said was fun to film. However, Imogen was not impressed and believed Mason was only doing it, so she would break up with Isaac. Kaplan told an Inside Soap reporter that there would be a rough road ahead for Imogen and Mason when a "major crisis" impacts on their families. Mason and Imogen began a secret romance and Kaplan said that there was "something really fun" about their relationship, adding that the fact it was forbidden was enticing.

==== Daniel Robinson ====
In June 2014, Kaplan bemoaned the lack of romance in Imogen's life, saying "Imogen hasn't had too much of a serious relationship yet but I really hope she does because she hasn't been too lucky with love. She needs a serious, smart, maybe an older boyfriend who is on her intellectual level." She also believed that Daniel Robinson (Tim Phillipps) would not be a suitable love interest for Imogen, believing him to be too free spirited. However, a few months later it was confirmed that Imogen would develop feelings for Daniel. After Daniel began a relationship with Amber, Imogen became jealous and bitter towards her friend. Imogen realised that she had feelings for Daniel after they joined forces for a community project. Naomi Canning (Morgana O'Reilly) became Imogen's confidant after she confronted her about her crush. A show spokesperson commented, "Imogen decides to confess all to Naomi, admitting that she's in love with Daniel and now realises she has been for a while."

Kaplan found Imogen's crush an interesting storyline to portray, but was glad that it was not real as she would be "an emotional wreck". Kaplan expressed her wish for Imogen and Daniel to become a couple, saying "I have wanted them to be together from the start. I think they balance each other out and Daniel brings out the best in Imogen, so I'm always hoping that it happens secretly!" When Daniel comforted an upset Imogen, she leaned in and kissed him. While Daniel was shocked by the kiss, Imogen tried to convince him that it was "a brain snap and nothing more". Kaplan said the kiss happened because it had become harder for Imogen to hide her feelings for Daniel. She saw an opportunity and went for it. Kaplan dubbed the moment "a hit and kiss". Kaplan also hoped Imogen and Amber's friendship would not be affected by the kiss. Daniel and Amber later broke up, but Daniel assured Imogen that it had nothing to do with their kiss and she tried to convince him to work things out with Amber.

When Daniel and Amber broke up for a second time, Imogen secretly hoped that she now had a chance at a relationship with Daniel. Kaplan told an Inside Soap columnist that Imogen was "torn" as she wanted to remain loyal to Amber, but did not want to miss the opportunity to be with Daniel. After noticing how low Daniel is feeling about the break up, Imogen suggested they go to a local nature reserve for the day. The plan worked and Daniel thanked Imogen with a kiss, after realising his feelings for her. However, Imogen did not react to the kiss the way Daniel hoped, believing that she was the "rebound girl". Kaplan explained, "She isn't sure if Daniel really likes her, or if he just needs a distraction. She's really confused..."

==== Tyler Brennan ====
In 2015, Imogen befriended Tyler Brennan (Travis Burns) and their relationship eventually turned romantic. When Imogen decided to lose her virginity to Tyler, Kaplan explained that Imogen hoped it would help her move on from Daniel. She continued, "Her peers are all in serious relationships, so she feels it's time for her to be in one, too, Tyler is fun, there's nothing offensive about him, and he's probably the distraction she needs at this time." Imogen insisted that she no longer had feelings for Daniel, but her half-sister Paige Smith (Olympia Valance) had doubts and tried to make sure that she was taking the next step with Tyler for the right reasons. Kaplan felt for her character, as her feelings changed from "very definite and determined, to really floundering". While Imogen was in Tyler's bedroom, she realised that she could not go through with consummating their relationship and told Tyler that she still loved Daniel. Kaplan thought Imogen would have regretted having sex with Tyler and believed that backing out was the right thing to do. Kaplan hoped Imogen would focus on what makes her happy in the future.

=== Departure and returns ===
On 4 April 2016, Daniel Kilkelly of Digital Spy speculated Kaplan had left Neighbours due to posts on her social media accounts that appeared to be "disguised farewells" to the show. A week later, Kilkelly and Sophie Dainty confirmed Imogen would be leaving the show, alongside Daniel (Tim Phillipps) on 26 April. Imogen receives a job offer from Naomi Canning in Los Angeles, and she and Daniel decide to move over there for a fresh start, following the deaths of Josh and Doug Willis (Terence Donovan). They are married shortly before their departure.

On 25 February 2019, a writer for Soap World announced that Kaplan had reprised the role. Imogen reappeared on-screen during the episode airing on 22 March 2019. The character returns to run Toadfish Rebecchi's (Ryan Moloney) law firm, after he takes time away to grieve for his wife Sonya Rebecchi (Eve Morey) who recently died. Kaplan confirmed that Imogen was still married to Daniel. Imogen soon discovers that her younger sister Piper Willis (Mavournee Hazel) is in a casual relationship with their mother's former partner Leo Tanaka (Tim Kano), and urges her to tell Terese or she will. Imogen is later involved in the Finn Kelly (Rob Mills) redemption storyline when she becomes his lawyer. Mills said that Finn trusts Imogen, and explained "He knows that she has his best interests at heart and that she's copping some heat for defending him. And their relationship is purely professional. Now Finn's reverted back to when he was 19, he's a bit naive – so he really respects her." Imogen's decision to represent Finn causes conflict with her family and friends, and she later receives a threat in the form of a pig's head left on her car.

Kaplan made an unannounced return to the serial as Imogen, alongside Phillipps, in 2023 during the serial's reboot episode premiere. They return to support Terese in her wedding to Toadie Rebecchi (Ryan Moloney). Their returns were kept secret up to the episode's broadcast in order to cover Terese and Toadie's marriage. Kaplan continued to make appearances in 2023, including during a week of flashback episodes designed to showcase to viewers stories that occurred whilst Neighbours had ceased broadcasting.

== Storylines ==
Imogen moves to Erinsborough with her family, when her mother becomes manager of Lassiter's Hotel. Imogen befriends Amber and tries to discourage her crush on Josh. Imogen develops a crush of her own on Amber's older brother, Mason. They go out on a date, but Imogen realises Mason still has feelings for Kate Ramsay and she breaks up with him. Feeling sidelined by her family, Imogen buys a car, as a small act of rebellion. Mason offers to fix the car, which Imogen names Hermione, in exchange for joint ownership. Imogen continues to feel ignored by her parents and Susan Kennedy notices that Imogen has developed unhealthy eating habits as a coping mechanism. Imogen denies this, but at home she begins binge eating. Imogen finds Robbo Slade (Aaron Jakubenko) unconscious, after he was involved in a hit-and-run. She calls an ambulance and flees the scene. Imogen later learns her car was used in the hit-and-run and she and Mason try to cover it up. When Robbo dies and Imogen receives a bad grade at school, the stress becomes too much and she collapses. Brad finds her coughing up blood and she is rushed to hospital, where it emerges that she has an inflamed oesophagus from excessive vomiting. Imogen is diagnosed with bulimia.

Terese tries to get Imogen to open up to her, by revealing her own struggles with an eating disorder. Terese later finds Imogen binge eating and comforts her daughter when she breaks down. Imogen begins attending counselling sessions. While undergoing work experience at Toadie Rebecchi's law office, Imogen learns a client, Eric Edwards (Paul O'Brien), is suing Brad over an injury he sustained at the gym. Imogen goes through Eric's file and Facebook page, where she learns that Eric is lying about when he got his injury. Toadie fires Imogen for breaching client confidentiality. Imogen develops feelings for Mason, but she is heartbroken when she sees him kissing Rhiannon Bates. She almost suffers a binging relapse, but Terese catches her in time. Imogen becomes school captain and her teacher Gemma Reeves (Kathryn Beck) threatens to reveal Imogen's bulimia secret, but Imogen tells her classmates herself. Imogen befriends Isaac Woods when she finds he is squatting at Number 24. They grow closer, causing Mason to declare his feelings for Imogen. Imogen is upset when Isaac is later arrested and he insults her. Josh is injured in an abseiling accident and while Brad blames Mason, Imogen supports him and they date in secret.

Imogen helps clear Mason's name and her family find out about their relationship. Imogen breaks up with Mason when she realises she is not as attracted to him as she had first thought. Imogen is shocked to discover she has a secret half-sister and she is initially angry with her father, but she accepts that Brad was unaware that the child existed and supports him when he begins searching for his daughter. After Kate dies, Imogen brings food to Kate's partner, Mark Brennan (Scott McGregor). When Imogen goes to Brennan's home unannounced, she is held hostage by Stephen Montague (Damian Hill), but Brennan protects her and tackles Montague. Imogen is frustrated when Daniel Robinson begins camping at Lassiter's Lake. Imogen continues to be annoyed by Daniel, but later wonders if he has feelings for her. Brennan suspects Imogen has a crush on him and lets her down gently. Imogen briefly dates Ethan Smith (Matthew Little) and when she skips school to meet him, Susan strips her of the school captaincy. After finding out Amber cheated on Josh, Imogen ends her friendship. Josh and Imogen learn Paige Smith is their half-sister. Tensions between Imogen and Amber do not improve and they get into a scrag fight. Imogen also verbally attacks Amber at a story slam.

Imogen asks Amber to sell her share of Hermione. Amber agrees, but Imogen later changes her mind and allows Amber and Daniel to use the car. Imogen bonds with Daniel when they find an orphaned wombat and she reconciles with Amber. Imogen realises that she has feelings for Daniel. Imogen supports Josh after he punches Chris Pappas (James Mason). She speaks to a reporter about the situation, but her words are twisted, which makes things worse. To make up for it, Imogen helps Toadie prepare Josh's legal defence. Brad almost costs Imogen her job when he takes a piece of evidence. Imogen grows closer to Daniel and kisses him. She apologises, claiming it was a mistake. Amber also forgives Imogen. Josh tells Daniel that Imogen loves him, but Imogen denies it. Imogen attends a university toga party, where she gets drunk and passes out. Imogen is found by Tyler Brennan who takes her home. Tyler is interested in Imogen, but she rejects him due to her feelings for Daniel. When Amber is called away days before her wedding, Imogen helps with the organisation, and Paul Robinson (Stefan Dennis) realises she has feelings for Daniel. Trying to stop Daniel and Amber from marrying, Paul tells Amber, who asks Imogen not to come to the wedding.

Daniel tries to convince her to come, but they become trapped down a well and miss the wedding. Their cries for help go unheard and the conditions exacerbate Imogen's asthma. When water is pumped into the well, Imogen and Daniel start to panic, but Josh realises where they are and they are rescued. Amber and Imogen reconcile at the hospital. In an effort to prove that she is not boring, Imogen plays strip poker with Tyler. They later go on a date and kiss. Imogen decides to lose her virginity to Tyler, but changes her mind at the last minute, saying that she still has feelings for Daniel. Imogen suspects Josh's job selling supplements is a pyramid scheme and her questions lead to him getting fired. Imogen manages to get his job back after speaking to his boss Forrest Jones (Nicholas Gunn). Imogen joins Forrest's self-defence classes and continues to believe something is wrong with the supplements. Imogen goes on a date with Forrest, but he attacks her when she takes a bottle of illegal peptides from his bag. Imogen hits him with a tree branch and escapes. Josh is fired and he tells Imogen that he wants nothing more to do with her. Daniel and Imogen spend the day together and he kisses her. Imogen suspects she is just a rebound, but Daniel assures her she is not. Imogen starts dating Caspar Smythe (Barton Welch) after meeting him at a French film festival. She breaks up with Caspar when she realises that they do not have much of a romantic spark. Daniel serenades Imogen and she loses her virginity to him that same night.

Upon leaving Erinsborough, Naomi gives Imogen a USB containing information about Paul's criminal activities. Josh, Daniel, Nate and Aaron Brennan expose this information online, ruining Paul's reputation. Daniel repents for his actions and tries to sell houses to make back Paul's lost money, but when he deliberately misleads Nate to try and sell a house to him, Imogen reveals this to Nate. Daniel's changing personality leads him and Imogen to break up. In a bid to move on, Imogen goes on a date with Tyler. She tries to seduce him, but he turns her down. Daniel and Imogen make amends and get back together. When he asks her to move in with him, Imogen admits that she has feelings for Tyler, and Daniel suggests they take a break. Both Daniel and Josh are injured during an explosion at Lassiter's Hotel. Josh sacrifices himself to save Daniel, and Imogen says goodbye to Josh shortly before he dies. Imogen and Daniel reunite and he supports her through Josh's funeral. Naomi offers Imogen a job offer in Los Angeles. She initially turns it down as she feels she cannot leave Terese, but changes her mind. Daniel offers to quit his job and go with her. When Imogen mentions that spouses can apply for a visa, Daniel proposes and Imogen accepts. A judge grants them an expedited marriage license and they decide to marry in secret. Imogen is worried about leaving Terese when she discovers she has turned to alcohol again. Brad and Terese interrupt the ceremony and convince Daniel and Imogen to get married at Number 22 in front of their family and friends. Terese also lends Imogen her wedding dress. After the wedding, Daniel and Imogen leave Erinsborough for Brisbane to see Daniel's parents, before going to Los Angeles.

Imogen returns to Erinsborough to help run Toadie's law practice, while he is in the United States. She learns from Chloe Brennan (April Rose Pengilly) that Piper is casually dating Terese's former boyfriend Leo Tanaka (Tim Kano), and she demands that Piper tell Terese or she will. Imogen meets with Finn Kelly and tells him he needs some legal advice, after learning that he has retrograde amnesia and is unable to recall the many crimes he has committed. When Imogen overhears that Finn has agreed to transfer to another hospital, she tells him to stay in Erinsborough and agrees to take him on as client. Imogen keeps it a secret, but Piper soon discovers that she is representing Finn and publicly confronts her. Imogen tells Piper that she is just treading water and is unhappy with herself, which prompts Piper to leave Erinsborough. Sheila Canning (Colette Mann), whose granddaughter is one of Finn's victims, makes it clear that she is not pleased that Imogen representing Finn, and upon learning that Finn might change his plea, she throws a drink in Imogen's lap. Imogen later finds a pig's head left for her on her car bonnet, and learns that Sheila put it there. She makes an official complaint to the police in the hope that they charge Sheila. Finn receives a non-custodial sentence, but Imogen struggles to find him somewhere to live until the Kennedys agree to house him. On the strength of her work with Finn, Imogen is offered a high-profile case in Los Angeles and books her flight back. Imogen drops the complaint against Sheila, who apologises. She visits Finn to wish him well, and Toadie to thank him for giving her an opportunity. Imogen says goodbye to her mother and leaves to visit Brad in Queensland, before returning to Los Angeles.

Four years later, Imogen returns to Erinsborough with Daniel to attend Terese's wedding to Toadie. Imogen reassures her mother when she has doubts due to her recent divorce from Paul. Imogen and Daniel return to Los Angeles a few days later.

== Reception ==
Shortly after her introduction, Jackie Brygel and Thomas Mitchell from TV Week commented "Imogen Willis has largely flown under the radar since her family arrived in Erinsborough." Susan Hill from the Daily Star said that Imogen was "pretty". While Digital Spy's Daniel Kilkelly branded her a "stressed-out schoolgirl". While a writer for the Daily Record called Imogen a "troubled teen". A Sunday Mail reporter observed that there was tension between Imogen and Josh and stated "It seems that Imogen just wants attention from their father". A columnist for the TVTimes wrote, "When you're as slim and gorgeous as Imogen, you can have your cake and eat it, but a whole cake?" During a review of the best bits from the soaps in 2013, a writer for Inside Soap pointed out September was a bad month for Imogen when she was diagnosed with bulimia.

A TV Week columnist branded Imogen and Mason "a modern-day Romeo and Juliet." Ben Pobjie, writing for The Sydney Morning Herald, called Imogen "the Walking Aneurysm" and observed that "she just enjoys being angry at people." Pobjie later dedicated a review to Imogen skipping school and losing the captaincy, calling it "the 6.30 timeslot's equivalent of Girls Gone Wild". He also wondered, "Will Imogen's head literally explode from all the stress and uptight facial expressions?" Larissa Dubecki, from the same newspaper, said Imogen had "officially become Erinsborough High's most annoying ex-school captain". A Soap World writer thought Imogen was a problem character, saying "Yes, she's fiery and funny but why the lack of romance in her life? Could Imogen be a lesbian? It would give her a great story to play!"

The character's 2019 return proved decisive among viewers, with some complaining that her attitude was irritating and annoying. Kaplan addressed the complaints on her social media, writing "While I realise many people aren't loving Imo's attitude (she sure is fierce), I promise she's not THAT bad the entire time." Kaplan later received hate comments from viewers who disliked Imogen's attitude, leading to her co-star Mavournee Hazel to come to her defence. Hazel stated, "You're well within your right to not like that character but nobody gives you permission to attack the actor who plays this character. And to get personal as well. No-one gave you permission." Simon Timblick of Radio Times commented that Imogen "made herself Public Enemy No.1 by becoming Finn Kelly's (Rob Mills) lawyer". Conor McMullan of Digital Spy praised Imogen's guest stint and involvement in Finn' storyline, writing: "We were particularly happy to see the return of Ariel Kaplan as Imogen Willis as his legal counsel. She's a joy to watch and we're hoping this opens the door to future appearances."
