= Daniel Robinson (Neighbours) =

Fictional character from the Australian soap opera Neighbours

- Neighbours character
- Portrayed by: Tim Phillipps
- Duration: 2014–2016, 2023
- First appearance: 29 April 2014
- Last appearance: 20 September 2023
- Introduced by: Jason Herbison
In-universe information
- Occupation: Hotel staff Bar manager Real estate agent
- Family: Robinson; Ramsay; Willis
- Father: Scott Robinson
- Mother: Charlene Robinson
- Sisters: Madison Robinson
- Wife: Imogen Willis (2016–present)
- Grandfathers: Harold Bishop (step)
- Grandmothers: Madge Bishop
- Uncles: Paul Robinson
- Aunts: Lucy Robinson
- First cousins: Amy Williams; Leo Tanaka
- Other relatives: Hilary Robinson; Tom Ramsay; Jimmy Williams

Daniel Robinson is a fictional character from the Australian soap opera Neighbours, played by Tim Phillipps. Daniel was created in 1992 as the son of iconic Neighbours couple Scott (Jason Donovan) and Charlene (Kylie Minogue). He was occasionally referred to in the episodes since then, but never seen on-screen. At the end of 2013, it was announced that Daniel would be introduced as a new family member for Paul Robinson (Stefan Dennis). Auditions were held for the role, with producers stating that the actor would need to resemble his on-screen parents. During the casting process, Phillipps was approached for the role and, following a chemistry read with Dennis, was given the part. He had previously appeared in Neighbours in 2007. Phillipps relocated to Melbourne for filming and was initially contracted for 12 months. He made his first screen appearance during the episode broadcast on 29 April 2014. Two years later, Daniel was written out of Neighbours, and he made his departure on 26 April 2016. Phillips made an unannounced return in the first episode of the 2023 Neighbours reprisal.

Daniel was initially portrayed as a happy-go-lucky, easy-going, hippy, who wanted to make the most out of life. He is a keen photographer, skateboarder and surfer. Phillipps used traits from his own personality to flesh out the character. Daniel came to Erinsborough to see where his parents fell in love and decided to stay for his uncle. Phillipps stated that Paul and Daniel have a great relationship, as they both want to be good influences on each other. Daniel's first major storyline was a love triangle involving himself, Amber Turner (Jenna Rosenow) and Josh Willis (Harley Bonner). Amber and Daniel were later engaged. Daniel's past was explored a little further when his ex-girlfriend Rain Taylor (Airlie Dodds) was introduced towards the end of 2014. The character has also formed a relationship with Imogen Willis (Ariel Kaplan) and been manipulated by Dakota Davies (Sheree Murphy). Daniel's personality also changed, as he became more ruthless and career driven. The character has received mixed reviews from critics.

== Creation and casting ==
Daniel is the son of iconic Neighbours couple Charlene (Kylie Minogue) and Scott Robinson (Jason Donovan), who departed the show in 1988 and 1989 respectively. He was created as an off-screen character in 1992. He was occasionally mentioned in episodes since then, but never appeared on-screen. Daniel's arrival was first teased by executive producer Jason Herbison in November 2013, who said a new family member for Paul Robinson (Stefan Dennis) would be introduced the following year. The character's arrival was officially confirmed on 2 December and the casting department began auditions for the role, with producers stating that he would need to resemble his screen parents. Dennis said the process was long as everyone wanted to find the right actor for the part. Dennis was "heavily involved" in the casting. He explained that as Daniel was an important character, "they wanted to get it right with looks, with acting ability and most importantly the chemistry between Paul and Daniel."

After the role was cast, producers planned to reveal the actor during his first episode broadcast in Australia. However, on 20 April 2014, a reporter for The Australian confirmed that actor Tim Phillipps had been cast in the role. Phillipps previously appeared in Neighbours in 2007, as Fox, a figment of Paul's imagination. Phillipps was cast shortly after returning from the United States where he was working for three-and-a-half years. He was approached for the part after he sent a tape to Melbourne, where Neighbours is filmed. He met with the producers and did "a chemistry read" with Dennis. He was offered the role shortly after. Phillipps relocated to Melbourne for filming and he was initially contracted for 12 months. He later said that he wanted to stay for longer as a year was not long enough. Phillipps researched his screen parents by watching clips of the show on YouTube. He made his screen debut as Daniel on 29 April 2014. In March 2015, Phillipps said that he was happy at Neighbours and would be staying for at least two more years.

== Development ==
=== Introduction and characterisation ===
Ahead of his introduction, Herbison said Daniel's unexpected arrival would see him "begin the next chapter of his life." While Jack Klompus for Digital Spy reported that Daniel would come to Erinsborough to see where his parents fell in love. Shortly after his arrival, Daniel set up camp at Lassiter's Lake, the scene of a fatal shooting involving his cousin Kate (Ashleigh Brewer). When Imogen Willis (Ariel Kaplan) discovered him there, she asked him to move on. When she saw Daniel had still not left, Imogen told Paul Robinson to come down and tell him to leave, but Paul was "delighted" to find the camper was actually his nephew. Dennis called Daniel's arrival "a huge surprise" for Paul and thought it was a good distraction for him. Paul's happiness was short-lived when Daniel told him he was only passing through, but after a phone call to his mother, Daniel changed his mind and stayed for his uncle.

In his fictional backstory, Daniel grew up in Brisbane with his family. He dropped out of university to travel around the country. Phillipps initially said Daniel was "happy-go-lucky" and in touch with nature. He asserted that Daniel would not arrive with any secrets. Phillipps later described Daniel as being "a laid-back surfer dude who is a bit of a hippy as well. He is easy-going, care-free and positive." Phillipps also said Daniel was a loving person, who wants the make the most of his life. Daniel is a keen photographer, skateboarder and beach bum. He is around four years younger than Phillipps, who was 26 when he joined the show. Phillipps stated that he shares some similarities with Daniel, as he used parts of his own personality to try and flesh out the character. He also said that he could relate to Daniel's friendly "loving side".

In March 2015, Phillipps hoped that he would get to explore a darker side to Daniel and said that he had been filming scenes which revealed Daniel had been a bully in the past. He continued, "this is really cool and it explains why he is so good now. He just decided one day that he doesn't want to be this guy because he saw how it was affecting people, so he became ultra good." Phillipps wanted to show that Daniel was not always good and he thought that he might have his uncle's darker traits in him.

=== Relationships ===
==== Paul Robinson ====
Sarah Ellis from Inside Soap wrote that Daniel's arrival could not have come at a better time for Paul, who was grieving for his recently deceased niece Kate. Phillipps said that Daniel was excited to spend time with Paul and believed that he could help him with his grief. He continued, "I think Daniel is really happy to just be settled for a while because he is road-tripping. Paul has been grieving over Kate's death, so they are a really good match for each other right now. Their relationship is really strong." Dennis asked for Paul and Daniel's first scene to be rewritten as he wanted to establish their strong relationship from the beginning. The original script saw Paul failing to recognise his nephew. Dennis took his worries to the writers who agreed to change the scenes. Phillipps stated that Paul and Daniel have "a great uncle and nephew relationship" and thought they were a good pairing, as they both wanted to be good influences on each other. He explained that Daniel initially believed his uncle was beloved by the community, but he slowly realised that a lot of people do not like Paul. Daniel decided to stay in Erinsborough and try and redeem his uncle. He told Ellis, "Daniel finds it bizarre that Paul isn't well liked, because he is all about the love!"

As Daniel bonded with his uncle, Paul invited him to move into his penthouse apartment. They clashed a little, due to Daniel's different outlook on life. He values relationships over material possessions, which is an odd concept to Paul. Daniel also picked up some shifts in Paul's hotel, but Phillipps pointed out that it was to keep his uncle happy. Daniel found the job too restricting to stay there forever. Phillipps has said that he enjoyed working with Dennis again, following their previous storyline together in 2007. He thought that it was an interesting piece of writing, saying that if Paul was going to imagine someone, it makes sense that the guy looks like his nephew. When Paul suffered a public meltdown due to his grief over Kate's death, Daniel was there to comfort him while he broke down. However, the situation proved too much for Daniel and he had to call in Karl Kennedy (Alan Fletcher), hoping that his uncle would receive the medical and psychological help he needed. Phillipps later said that helping Paul was "a pretty tough ask" for Daniel and while he thinks of himself as kind of therapist to people, the situation was "pretty extreme". Phillipps added that the storyline presented "an interesting dynamic" for the pair.

==== Amber Turner ====
"Daniel is now there to be a really great option for Amber. I think the fans are happy for Amber to be involved in a relationship that's free, fresh, fun and loving."

— Phillipps on Amber and Daniel's love triangle storyline (2014).

During a behind-the-scenes video posted by Neighbours, Phillipps hinted that Daniel could find romance with established character Amber Turner (Jenna Rosenow), who was in a relationship with Josh Willis (Harley Bonner) at the time. Phillipps later said that Daniel and Amber would become friends, as they bond over their shared love for photography. When Josh began to worry about Daniel's intentions towards his girlfriend, Daniel was "able to put Josh at ease". He and Amber were honest about their connection and passed it off as platonic love. A few weeks later, Amber and Daniel almost shared a kiss, as she started to fall out of love with Josh. Rosenow explained that Amber was attracted to Daniel's caring side and liked how he noticed things about her that Josh never had. When it became difficult for them to be apart, they spent the afternoon together, which resulted in their near kiss. With Amber feeling guilty about betraying Josh, she decided to break-up with him, but when he made a romantic gesture, she found she could not go through with it.

After Amber failed to break-up with Josh, Daniel tried to keep his distance from her. However, Paige Smith (Olympia Valance) had already noticed their growing closeness, so she kissed Daniel to prompt a reaction and work out what was truly going on with them. Amber was "gutted" when she witnessed the kiss and it caused her to give into her feelings for Daniel and they kissed. Daniel was left feeling guilty about Josh and Phillipps commented "He wants to be with Amber, but it's not in his nature to just walk all over people." Phillipps liked that Daniel's first major storyline was a love triangle as it was "quite relatable" for everyone. He thought the reaction to it had been mixed, but there had been support for Amber and Daniel. A few weeks later, Josh walked in on Amber and Daniel kissing. Bonner told an Inside Soap reporter that Josh was devastated by the scene and did not want to hear Amber's apology. Josh eventually went to the penthouse to speak with Daniel and came close to hitting him. He then smashed up Amber and Daniel's darkroom, knowing that is where they had spent a lot of their time together. Phillipps confirmed that Amber and Daniel would stay together despite the fallout and that they would grow closer because of it. The couple were given the portmanteau Damber by fans and critics.

When a tornado hit Erinsborough, Amber and Daniel decided to go out in it to take photographs. Prior to their departure, Daniel fells out with Paul after he told Amber about the origin of Daniel's tattoo, which he got while he was with his ex-girlfriend. As the weather became more severe, Amber and Daniel were caught up in the tornado and the roof of their car was ripped off. They sought shelter in the local garage and later rescued Paul, who came looking for them. Phillipps commented that the situation made Daniel see things clearly and he realised that he wanted to "take things to the next level" with Amber, so he proposed to her. Phillipps told All About Soap's Carena Crawford, "He's so happy when she says yes because its exactly what he wants. No matter what happens next, he'll never regret asking her to be his wife." When Amber's parents refused to support the engagement, she decided to move out. Daniel asked her to move into the penthouse with him, but Paul vetoed the plan, so they briefly moved into Daniel's car instead. Phillipps joked that Daniel was "Mr Positive", so he did not let their living arrangements ruin his enthusiasm. Amber struggled with her new living conditions and eventually moved back home.

In October 2014, Daniel's ex-girlfriend Rain Taylor (Airlie Dodds) was introduced, and the official website stated that she would cause "misery" for Daniel. Rain came to Erinsborough to establish a commune called New Eden. However, after befriending Amber, Rain began manipulating her into moving into the commune and giving up her university studies. Amber's mother, Lauren (Kate Kendall), came to Daniel and expressed her fears about Rain's influence on her daughter. Daniel then tried to tell Amber that she was being brainwashed by Rain, but she refused to listen to him. Rain later questioned why Daniel and Amber were together and kissed Daniel in a bid to show him that his relationship with Amber was wrong. When Amber asked Rain for a meditation session, Rain used the opportunity to try and brainwash her into breaking up with Daniel. Rain's plan failed, but her influence left Amber questioning her relationship with Daniel and whether she should try to discover who she really is. When Daniel invited Amber to Queensland to meet his parents, she declined and instead ended their engagement. Shortly after Amber's car was stolen, Daniel came to her rescue, explaining that he sensed she was in trouble. Amber took this as a sign that they were meant to be together and they resumed their relationship.

After they set a wedding date, Harold Bishop (Ian Smith), who was married to Daniel's grandmother Madge (Anne Charleston), returned to Erinsborough for the ceremony. He gave Daniel some advice about marriage, telling him to have "realistic expectations." Phillipps thought that Daniel and Amber were rushing into marriage, but explained that the producers wanted the wedding to air as part of the show's 30th anniversary in March 2015. He thought they should have waited another year. Phillipps also admitted that he did not think Amber and Daniel were well suited, saying "they are very easygoing people and I am not sure if that creates the best sparks." On the day of his wedding, Daniel decided to be "a hopeless romantic" and try to get Amber an antique ring from a well that belonged to his ancestor. Phillipps explained that Amber had been obsessing about the love story connected to the ring and Daniel wanted to give it to her on their wedding day. Daniel and Imogen climbed into the well, but the ladder gave way, trapping them down there and forcing Daniel to miss his wedding. While Daniel worried about Amber, she assumed that he had run off with Imogen. After a few days, Josh worked out where Daniel and Imogen were, and they were rescued, leading to a reconciliation between Daniel and Amber.

Shortly afterwards, Amber discovered she was pregnant, forcing her to admit to Daniel that she had a one-night stand with Josh. Rosenow commented that it was not "an ideal situation" and that Amber hoped the baby was Daniel's, as she wanted their relationship to work. Amber later took a paternity test and Daniel assured her that no matter what the result was, he would support her. However, Daniel was "devastated" when Josh was confirmed to be the father. He tried "to put a brave face on things", but soon realised that he could not support Amber and the baby financially. This gave Josh an opportunity to try and prove himself to Amber, hoping she would come back to him. But Daniel sold some shares in Off Air to lessen his financial troubles. As their relationship became more strained, Daniel attempted to "get things back on track" with a romantic gesture. But they soon realised that too much had changed and decided to break-up.

==== Imogen Willis ====
Digital Spy's Daniel Kilkelly noticed a connection between Daniel and Imogen in their first scenes together and Phillipps told him that something could happen between them in the future. He continued, "Imogen gets into twists and gets very worked up about things and Daniel just doesn't get it. He finds it really funny and thinks that Imogen is super sweet. He doesn't get why she finds stuff so frustrating, but he really loves that about her as well." Daniel and Imogen clashed again when she dropped her birthday dress after he ran into her on his skateboard. Daniel bought her a new dress, but it was too big for Imogen and she refused to accept it. Later that day, Imogen accidentally crushed Daniel's skateboard during a driving lesson, but Daniel believed it was her way of getting revenge for the dress. Imogen developed feelings for Daniel after they teamed up for a community project. Phillipps commented that Daniel and Imogen had developed "a great chummy friendship", so he thought Daniel would be surprised to learn that Imogen has feelings for him.

When Daniel comforted an upset Imogen, she leaned in and kissed him. While Daniel was shocked by the kiss, Imogen tried to convince him that it was "a brain snap and nothing more". Daniel then had to choose whether to tell Amber about the kiss or not. Following his break-up with Amber, Daniel had to assure Imogen that it was nothing to do with their kiss. She then tried to convince Daniel to work things out with Amber, but his "unwavering confidence in their love" had been knocked. Kaplan expressed her wish for Imogen and Daniel to become a couple, saying "I have wanted them to be together from the start. I think they balance each other out and Daniel brings out the best in Imogen, so I'm always hoping that it happens secretly!" Phillipps later admitted that Daniel and Imogen were better suited than Daniel and Amber. He thought they should get together and hoped the writers had noticed that there was a demand for them to be a couple on social media sites.

On the day of his wedding, Imogen told Daniel that she was in love with him. Phillipps commented that Daniel took Imogen's confession on board and just went with it. However, after they became trapped in a well, things became awkward between them and they talked it through. Phillipps quipped "poor little Imogen gets let down gently yet again." Both Daniel and Imogen thought they would be found quickly, but when someone shut the grill and water was pumped into the well, they realised that they might die down there. However, they were eventually rescued and Phillipps joked that he was relieved that he still had a job. He added that he enjoyed working on the storyline with Kaplan. When Daniel and Amber ended their relationship for a second time, an Inside Soap columnist noted that Daniel was "understandably" upset by the break up. In an effort to cheer Daniel up, Imogen suggested a day out at a local nature reserve. Daniel thanked Imogen with a kiss, after realising his feelings for her. However, Imogen did not react well as she was unsure if Daniel actually liked her, or she was just his "rebound girl".

Daniel eventually convinced Imogen that he reciprocated her feelings and loved her as much as she loved him. After consummating their relationship, Paul saw them together and was "thrilled that his nephew has found happiness". Despite Imogen wanting to keep the relationship a secret, Paul told her mother Terese (Rebekah Elmaloglou) and Susan Kennedy (Jackie Woodburne). Daniel was invited to lunch with the Willis family and he tried his best to impress Terese, but soon realised that it was Imogen's father, Brad (Kip Gamblin), that he needed approval from. Daniel's efforts to impress Brad went wrong when he caused "an unsettling incident" that suddenly ended the lunch.

=== Dakota Davies' manipulation ===
When Paul's former lover Dakota Davies (Sheree Murphy) came to town, Daniel became embroiled in her plan to get revenge on Paul and smuggle diamonds into Australia. Dakota convinced Paul to finance a bar for her and she then set out "to ingratiate herself with an impressionable Daniel". Noting Paul's love for his nephew, Dakota offered Daniel the managers job at the bar and he accepted after being persuaded by Paul. They were both unaware that Dakota was planning on setting up Daniel as "the perfect front-man" for their plan. When Daniel was tasked with signing for several shipments of coffee beans, Mark Brennan (Scott McGregor) realised that he was being set up. Shortly before a planned police raid was carried out on the bar, Brennan learned that Daniel was meant to sign for another delivery containing smuggled diamonds, so he told Amber's father, Constable Matt Turner (Josef Brown) in the hope that he could help. Matt then detained Daniel for jaywalking, while the raid went ahead, which infuriated him. Daniel and Amber initially believed that Matt was trying to "punish" them both for the engagement, but they eventually thanked him when he explained that he was only protecting Daniel.

=== Personality change ===
In December 2015, Daniel Kilkelly (Digital Spy) revealed plans for Daniel's "good-natured" personality to change as he turned away from his hippy ideals. Daniel changed his look and became more career-driven. Of the changes to Daniel's personality, Phillipps explained: "I think it's an important change that had to happen for Daniel's development. He's always been a positive person, and I don't think that goes away in this storyline. But Daniel has been under Paul's guidance for a long time now. It's made him start to understand some really important life messages about how sometimes you've got to take more risks, be more ruthless and push a little harder. It's all part of Daniel's evolution as a character." Phillipps told Kilkelly that he spoke to the writers about giving Daniel "more status" within the community and believed that making him more career-driven would be a good way for him to gain respect from other characters. The actor also believed that viewers would find Daniel more interesting, but added that his positive attitude would still be there. Daniel began working at Lassiter's Hotel, following his brief stint in real estate sales. He already knew the hotel business from working alongside Paul. Daniel's new attitude and career change was marked by a new haircut. Phillipps had chosen to shave his hair off, so the writers incorporated his new style into the storyline. Phillipps added that he would not like to see Daniel become a copy of his uncle, but he did want Daniel to be "strong-willed and street smart" like him.

=== Departure ===
On 16 April 2016, Daniel Kilkelly and Sophie Dainty of Digital Spy confirmed Daniel would be leaving the show, alongside Imogen on 26 April. Phillipps told Sarah Ellis of Inside Soap that it was not his decision to leave Neighbours, and that producers had chosen to write out Daniel so he and Imogen could go together. He explained, "So much negative stuff had happened that the show wanted something positive to come out of it – so with Imogen going, the only real option was for Daniel to go, too."

After Imogen is offered a job in Los Angeles, Daniel is "thrilled" for her and feels like something positive has come along at the right time, following the death of her brother. When they realise that in order for Daniel to go with her, they would need a spouse visa, so Daniel proposes. Daniel and Imogen attempt to get married in secret, but Imogen's parents find out and organise a wedding at Number 22. Phillipps said, "I think the writers also wanted to create a parallel with Daniel leaving Ramsay Street after getting married, just like his parents Scott and Charlene did." He added that there was possibility Daniel could return to Erinsborough in the future, especially as he had to fix his relationship with Paul.

Phillipps reprised his role in 2023 upon the reboot of Neighbours, alongside Kaplan, to support Paul while his now ex-wife, Terese, gets re-married. Daniel's return spans across three episodes. Phillipps explained that he had been contacted by Neighbours producers and asked to "pop back to the show" for a few episodes. He described feeling "honoured and excited" to return to the serial and thanked Dennis and Kaplan for working with him again.

== Storylines ==
While on a road trip, Daniel comes to Erinsborough and sets up camp at Lassiter's Lake. Imogen Willis asks him to move on, but when she finds he has not, she brings Paul Robinson to ask him instead. Paul is happy to see his nephew and asks him to stay. Daniel agrees after seeing how unpopular and lonely his Uncle Paul has become. He starts working at Lassiter's Hotel and he also clashes with Imogen again. Daniel bonds with Amber Turner over their shared love of photography, and Daniel assures her boyfriend, Josh, that they have a platonic connection. However, both Amber and Daniel develop feelings for each other and soon begin an affair. Josh becomes suspicious and finds Daniel and Amber kissing in their dark room. Daniel asks Amber to move in with him, but she feels it is too soon. When Amber and Daniel get caught up in a tornado that hits Erinsborough when they go out to photograph it. Despite arguing beforehand, Daniel proposes to Amber and she accepts. Imogen and Daniel bond when they care for an orphaned wombat.

Daniel finds himself being manipulated by Dakota Davies, who installs him as manager of her new bar. She asks Daniel to sign for a shipment of coffee beans containing diamonds, but Matt Turner detains Daniel for jaywalking so he is not arrested during a police raid on the bar. When Amber's parents and Paul do not support the engagement, Amber and Daniel move into his car. Amber returns home after the car is attacked. Daniel's ex-girlfriend, Rain Taylor, arrives in town to set up a commune called New Eden. Rain tries to manipulate Amber into breaking up with Daniel, before she is driven out of town. While Daniel is comforting Imogen, she kisses him. She apologises and tells him it was a mistake. Amber realises that she wants to discover who she is and refuses to Daniel's invite to meet his parents, ending their engagement. Daniel opens the Off Air bar. Josh competes with Daniel for Amber, while she learns about the kiss with Imogen. After Amber's car is stolen, Daniel comes to her rescue and they renew their engagement.

Harold Bishop visits and admits to having reservations about Amber and the wedding, causing Daniel to rescind his invitation. Paul also tries to stop Daniel from getting married by inviting Des Clarke (Paul Keane) to talk to him about his failed first wedding. On the day of the wedding, Daniel tries to persuade Imogen to attend, but she admits that she is in love with him. Daniel learns the whereabouts of Agnes Robinson's ring and Imogen goes with him to retrieve it from an old well. They become trapped in the well after the ladder breaks, causing Daniel to miss the wedding. The situation in the well grows worse when Imogen's asthma makes it hard for her to breathe and water is pumped in. Josh manages to work out where they are, leading to their rescue. Amber and Daniel reunite, and Amber learns she is pregnant. Amber admits that she had a one-night stand with Josh and a DNA test shows he is the father. Daniel tries to support Amber financially and sells some of his Off Air shares to Karl Kennedy. He and Amber later break-up.

Daniel helps Paul to reunite with his estranged daughter Amy Williams (Zoe Cramond). He also kisses Imogen, but she rejects him, fearing that he might be on the rebound. Daniel becomes jealous when she starts dating Caspar Smythe (Barton Welch) and his feelings for her clear. Imogen and Daniel begin a relationship and he supports her when her parents separate. Daniel moves in with the Brennan brothers at Number 24. He runs a suspended coffee scheme at Off Air, which leads to him being attacked by a homeless man who misinterprets Daniel's attempt to wake him. Daniel refuses to report the man, but he is clearly affected by the incident and displays unusual behaviour. He later takes his anger out on Aaron Brennan (Matt Wilson). Off Air is closed when Daniel struggles to keep up with the payments, and Paul refuses to give him a loan. Daniel finds Aaron and Nate Kinski (Meyne Wyatt) searching through Paul's personal computer files, and they find Paul's plans for a housing estate surrounding Erinsborough High. Daniel sends all the files to the media.

Daniel sells one of the houses from the estate, and Paul gives him a job as a salesman. Imogen voices her concerns about Daniel's changing behaviour, after he convinces Nate to buy a house knowing that certain amenities will not be built. Imogen tells Nate the truth and she and Daniel break up. Daniel also falls out with Paul when he admits to leaking Paul's files to the media. Daniel sees Paul receiving a loan from Dimato for Paul's new business venture. Paul tells Daniel to leave town, which he does without revealing what he knows. He returns with a new hair cut and wants to work at Lassiter's again. Julie Quill agrees to employ him. Daniel and Imogen eventually get back together, but when he works extra hours, she becomes dissatisfied and develops feelings for Tyler. She admits this to Daniel, who decides they take a break and be free to date other people, despite Imogen insisting she would never have acted on her attraction to Tyler. Josh tries to convince Daniel to reconsider the break-up, but Daniel responds by criticising him for his failures as a father, before the hotel boiler explodes, trapping them both under a column. Despite knowing the column is the only thing keeping him from haemorrhaging to death, Josh asks Karl to lift it to save Daniel.

Imogen tells Daniel that Josh died to save him, and they reunite. Daniel is discharged after undergoing surgery. Imogen receives a job offer in Los Angeles and she accepts. Daniel offers to quit his job and go with her. When Imogen mentions spouses can apply for a visa, Daniel proposes and she accepts. Daniel's younger sister Madison Robinson (Sarah Ellen) arrives to check up on him on behalf of their parents. A judge grants Daniel and Imogen an expedited marriage license and they decide to marry in secret. However, Imogen's parents interrupt the ceremony and convince Daniel and Imogen to get married at their home in front of their family and friends. After the wedding, Daniel and Imogen leave Erinsborough for Brisbane to see Daniel's parents, before going to Los Angeles, where Daniel enrols in a university to study nursing.

Seven years later, Daniel returns to Erinsborough with Imogen to attend Terese's wedding to Toadie Rebecchi (Ryan Moloney). Daniel explains that he also came to support Paul, who is now Terese's ex-husband. He meets up with his aunt, Lucy Robinson (Melissa Bell), and his cousin, Leo Tanaka (Tim Kano), as well as with Harold. He and Imogen return to Los Angeles a few days later.

== Reception ==
For his portrayal of Daniel, Phillipps was nominated for Best Daytime Star at the Inside Soap Awards. The Sydney Morning Herald's Ben Pobjie observed that Daniel's introduction was one of the "most mildly anticipated events" in the show's history and that the character provided a link to the show's past. But he was not keen on his personality, saying "Daniel Robinson is a handsome young thing, whose good looks more than make up for the fact he's an incredibly irritating hippie tosser." Dianne Butler, writing for news.com.au, branded Daniel "a gorgeous blond vision" and suspected he had been introduced in a bid to increase ratings. Butler later praised Phillipps' performance and compared him to Guy Pearce, who appeared on the show in the 1980s, writing "Friends, we're going to look back and talk about Tim Phillipps, pictured, the way we mention Guy Pearce's Neighbours' years: like a lovely dream and weren't we lucky we had him at all. There's a picture for you. Now."

A Soap World writer thought that Daniel was "idealistic and naive". An Inside Soap columnist observed that the chemistry between Amber and Daniel was "undeniable". Laura Morgan of All About Soap believed Amber was better suited to Daniel than Josh, as she had "way better chemistry" with him. Morgan said, "from the minute she clapped eyes on Scott and Charlene's sexy son, it was clear they were going to get it on. It definitely didn't take them long either." During a review of the year, Digital Spy's Daniel Kilkelly praised Phillipps for being "a strong actor" and said he deserved "a chance to shine" as Daniel in the new year. Kilkelly bemoaned the lack of challenging storylines for him and hoped he would be given something more to do that did not revolve around his relationship with Amber. When Daniel got stuck in the well, an Inside Soap columnist quipped "What kind of idiot thinks that climbing down a well an hour before his wedding is a good idea? Neighbours' Daniel, that's who!"
