= Paige Smith =

Fictional character from the Australian soap opera Neighbours

- Neighbours character
- Portrayed by: Olympia Valance
- Duration: 2014–2018, 2020, 2022
- First appearance: 2 June 2014
- Last appearance: 28 July 2022
- Introduced by: Jason Herbison
- Spin-off appearances: Hey Piper (2015)
In-universe information
- Other names: Paige Novak
- Occupation: Waitress; Garage manager; University student; Executive assistant; Real estate agent
- Family: Willis
- Father: Brad Willis
- Mother: Lauren Carpenter
- Adoptive father: John Smith
- Adoptive mother: Mary Smith
- Stepfather: Matt Turner
- Stepmother: Terese Willis
- Brothers: Ethan Smith (adoptive)
- Half-brothers: Ned Willis; Mason Turner; Josh Willis; Bailey Turner
- Half-sisters: Imogen Willis; Amber Turner; Piper Willis
- Husband: Mark Brennan (2020–)
- Sons: Gabriel Smith; Freddie Brennan
- Grandfathers: Doug Willis; Lou Carpenter
- Grandmothers: Pam Willis; Kathy Carpenter
- Uncles: Guy Carpenter
- Nieces: Matilda Turner
- First cousins: Roxy Willis

Paige Smith (also Novak) is a fictional character from the Australian soap opera Neighbours, played by Olympia Valance. The actress was cast in February 2014 after a lengthy audition process, which included four call-backs. Series producer Jason Herbison said Valance was cast in the role as she was "the perfect fit" for the character. Valance had been a successful model prior to her casting and Paige marked her first acting role. Valance's half-sister Holly Valance previously appeared in the show as Felicity Scully. Valance was initially contracted for three years. She made her first screen appearance during the episode broadcast on 2 June 2014. Valance filmed her final scenes in November 2017 and Paige's departure aired on 30 March 2018. Valance returned on 24 February 2020, as part of the serial's 35th anniversary celebrations. On 4 May 2022, Valance confirmed that she was returning for the show's final episodes and Paige returned on 20 July 2022 until the show's final episode on 28 July 2022.

Paige is portrayed as being "feisty", "tough", "unpredictable" and resourceful. Valance said Paige was not a mean character and often hid her softer side behind a "hard exterior". The character was introduced as the biological daughter of Brad Willis (Kip Gamblin) and Lauren Carpenter (Kate Kendall) and her early storylines focused on building relationships with her parents and half-siblings. Paige initially chose to keep her identity a secret as she was scared that she would not be accepted. Paige also developed a relationship with her housemate Mark Brennan (Scott McGregor) and was blackmailed into selling illegal car parts alongside Tyler Brennan (Travis Burns). The character has received mostly positive attention from critics, with one saying she had caused "quite a stir" since her debut and another who noted that she had a distinctive on-screen presence. Valance earned a nomination for Most Popular New Talent at the 2015 Logie Awards for her portrayal of Paige.

== Casting ==
On 9 March 2014, Colin Vickery from news.com.au reported that Olympia Valance had joined the cast of Neighbours as Paige Novak. Valance had been a successful model prior to her casting in February and Paige marked her first acting role. She won the part after a lengthy audition process, which included four call-backs that got "harder and harder" each time. Of her casting, Valance commented "When I got the call to say the part was mine, I was so excited. In Australia, if you're on Neighbours, you're considered to have one of the best jobs in the world. It's iconic." One of the first people Valance called was her half-sister Holly Valance, who previously appeared in Neighbours as Felicity Scully. She later said that working with people who knew her sister made her feel "very comfortable" on-set.

Series producer Jason Herbison confirmed that Valance had won the role based on her own talents, saying she was "the perfect fit for Paige". Valance was initially contracted for three years. She made her screen debut as Paige on 2 June 2014. In December, Valance commented that she would leave Neighbours at the end of her contract, as she had a desire to move to London. However, in October 2016, Fiona Byrne of the Herald Sun reported that Valance had decided to extend her contract with the show for another six to eight months. Valance commented, "I love my job and I don't feel ready to leave just yet and they were happy to have me for a bit longer."

== Development ==
=== Backstory and characterisation ===
In her fictional backstory, Paige had "a miserable upbringing" with her adoptive parents, and always felt second best to brother Ethan (Matthew Little). After leaving her boarding school, Paige became self-sufficient and worked various jobs. Her adoptive parents would send her "guilt-induced cash gifts" which she spent quickly on holidays and parties. Ahead of her introduction, Valance said "Paige isn't a mean character – she's cool and sexy and a bit edgy — and I think everyone is going to love her." She also thought Paige's personality had many layers and hoped viewers would like her and find her interesting.

Valance later described Paige as being "feisty", "unpredictable", "funny" and "very compassionate". She called Paige resourceful and said her "hard exterior" often hid her softer side. The Neighbours official website branded Paige "tough" and "volatile", adding that she works hard and enjoyed partying and skateboarding in her spare time. Valance liked her character and said she could identify with her family situation, as she is one of eight half-siblings. She also felt lucky to be playing someone with "such a complex history".

=== Family ===
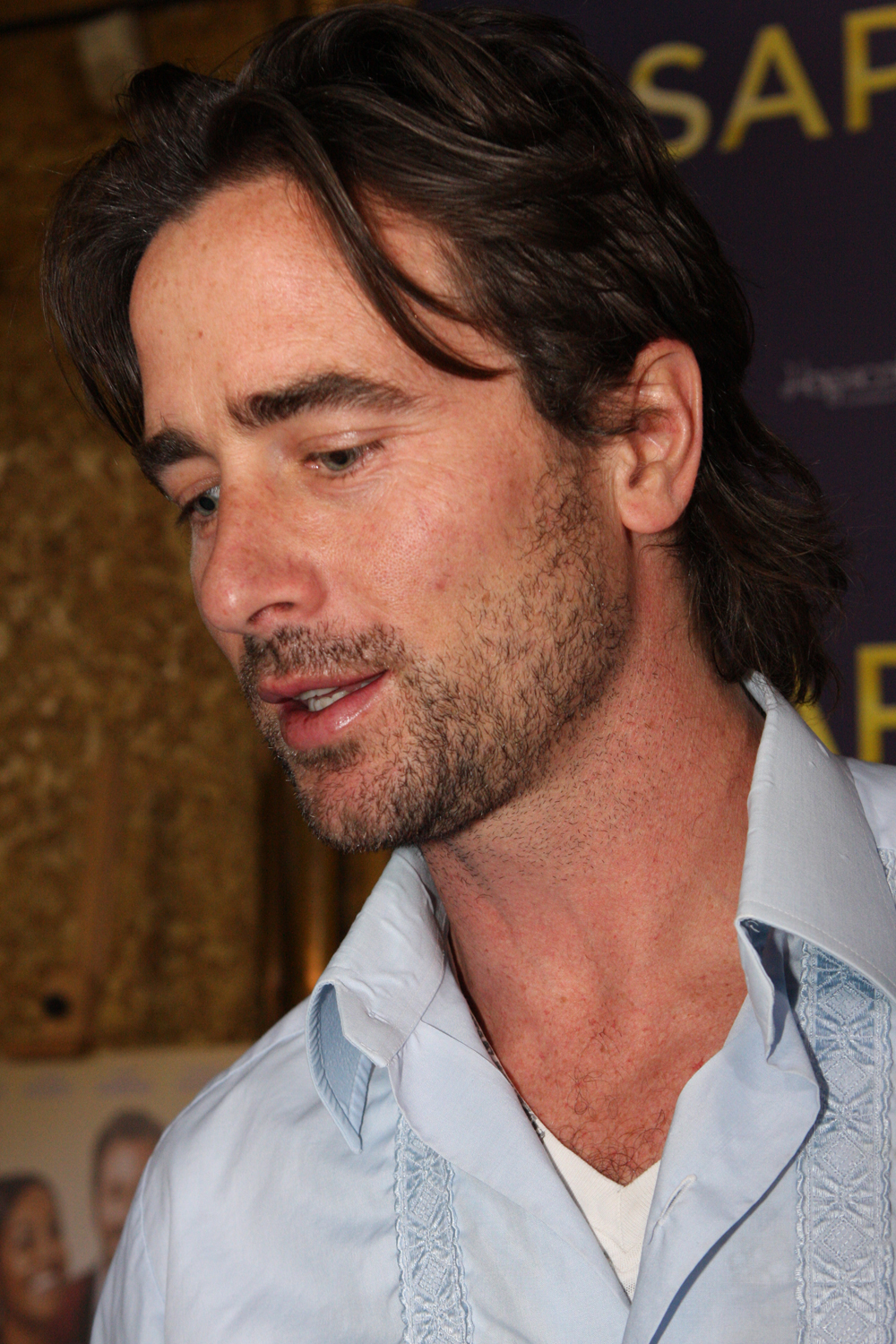
Kip Gamblin plays Paige's biological father Brad Willis.

Paige first became aware that her biological parents, Brad Willis (Kip Gamblin) and Lauren Carpenter (Kate Kendall), were looking for her when Brad met with Ethan in Adelaide. Valance told All About Soap's Carena Crawford that Paige felt relieved that she had finally found her parents, but there were so many unanswered questions surrounding them and her adoption. Paige became curious about her parents and followed them back to Erinsborough to find out more about them. She decided to keep her identity a secret, in order to find out what Brad and Lauren were really like. Paige checked into the local hotel with the fake surname Novak and made up a back story about being from Tasmania. Paige immediately ran into Josh Willis (Harley Bonner) and flirted with him, unaware that he was her half-brother. Valance explained that Paige was naturally flirty and thought Josh was "pretty hot" until she learned they were related. Paige's actions also put her half-sister, Amber (Jenna Rosenow), offside as she was dating Josh at the time.

Paige met her mother at her café and managed to get herself a job as a waitress. Lauren and Paige made a good impression on each other and Valance said there was a connection between them. Paige also engineered a meeting with Brad by joining the gym he managed, and Valance commented that Paige really liked her father. However, Brad's wife, Terese (Rebekah Elmaloglou), was quite suspicious of who Paige was, especially as Paige had no ID and had checked into the hotel with "disposable cash". Paige also struggled to get along with her other half-sister, Imogen (Ariel Kaplan), as she was also suspicious of her, but Paige bonded well with her younger half-brother Bailey (Calen Mackenzie). Valance thought that deep down Paige was scared that her parents would not accept her as their daughter. She later said, "She builds relationships with people on the street who think she's someone she's not. Afterwards, people will find it hard to accept her because of it. There are a lot of people involved."

Paige's grandmother, Kathy Carpenter (Tina Bursill), was the first to discover her true identity. Paige learned that Kathy had hired a private detective to find her granddaughter and realised that she would soon have to tell everyone the truth. When Kathy asked Paige to mind her own business, Paige became angry and "in the heat of the moment", she took Kathy's heart medication. Valance insisted that Paige regretted her actions and intended to return the pills. While they were out for a drive together, Kathy found Paige's sketchbook with a drawing of Lauren inside that had the world "mum" underneath it. Kathy was so startled that she drove away without concentrating and crashed into Toadfish Rebecchi (Ryan Moloney). Kathy then struggled to breathe as her scarf was choking her, and Paige had to step in and save her. Valance commented, "This isn't the way she wanted things to work out, of course, and she knows that she has to do everything she can to save Kathy's life."

After Kathy was rushed to hospital, Paige decided to leave town, believing that everyone would be disappointed in her. Valance said it would be hard for Paige to convince her parents that she did not mean to cause trouble, as she had been lying to them for so long. Paige left two teddy bears Lauren gave her at birth on her doorstep and caught a bus. Lauren managed to catch up to her and they had a "very emotional" reunion. Lauren then took Paige to Brad who was shocked at the revelation. When he asked Paige for a DNA test, Valance understood why. Her siblings had mixed reactions; Amber was not happy about Paige being her sister, while Imogen and Josh were accepting and started "to warm to her". However, Amber later showed them Paige's sketchbook and the unkind things she had written about them, which undermined the progress Paige had made with them. Valance did not think things would be easy for Paige going forward, but hoped that her new family would realise her heart was in the right place, even though she went about things the wrong way.

Neither Terese or Matt were pleased when Paige revealed her identity. When Lauren asked Matt to welcome Paige into the family, he agreed. But Terese then asked him to join her in excluding Paige from both their families. When Matt learned Paige was responsible for trashing Harold's Store, he was forced to arrest her. Paige trashed the store after becoming frustrated over hiding her identity from Lauren. Paige admitted to the crime, while Lauren pleaded with Matt to go easy on her, but he could not give Paige any "special treatment" and they had to leave it to the law. Things between Paige and Terese eventually got easier, and Elmaloglou explained that there was a point where Terese finally accepts that Paige is not going anywhere. She hoped that Terese would take Paige under her wing in the future.

=== Relationship with Mark Brennan ===
"Paige is very keen to make a go of things with Mark as she really likes him. It won't be easy for them as Mark is still hurting over Kate, but if she persists it looks like they could make a great couple."

— A show spokesperson on Paige's romance with Mark. (2014)

Paige became Mark Brennan's (Scott McGregor) new housemate when she moved onto Ramsay Street. Valance did not rule out a relationship between Mark and Paige, saying "Hmmm, she is single, he is single – I can't say anymore!" In August 2014, it was confirmed that producers had planned a romance storyline for Paige and Mark. They grew closer and realised that they had a deeper connection than friendship. During a gym work out, Paige proposed a little competition that meant whoever lost had to buy the other dinner. Paige pushed Mark over, causing him to lose and agree to take her out, but neither of them call it a date. Valance commented that Paige had been "really attracted" to Mark from the start, so she gets dressed up for the dinner. However, Mark struggled with the idea of moving on from his deceased fiancée Kate Ramsay (Ashleigh Brewer), and even though he knew it was a date, he had not admitted it out loud.

Mark made the situation worse by ignoring Paige afterwards, causing her to confront him as a storm hit Erinsborough. Valance explained "They're both saturated from bringing in everything from outside and she's super fired up. She just loses it and screams in his face." Mark and Paige then consummated their relationship. Paige and Mark's first official date ended abruptly when Paige turned up wearing Kate's dress, which she had purchased from a charity shop. Mark reacted angrily and accused Paige of being up to something, before shouting at her to get out of the bar. Mark later realised that he had been too harsh on Paige, but just as he decided to give their relationship another go, he saw her kissing another man. McGregor commented "He thinks he's blown his chances with her – but he's also wondering if this is what he really wants." McGregor was cautious about his character getting involved with Paige, as he believed that they were "at different stages of their lives". There was an age gap between them and a difference in maturity, which McGregor thought would impact on their future as a couple.

Paige later witnessed Mark kissing Dakota Davies (Sheree Murphy), leaving her "hurt and frustrated". After sitting down to discuss their relationship, Mark told Paige that he had been undercover with the police and was investigating Dakota, who kissed him. Paige made it clear that Mark had not been treating her right, especially as he did not confide in her about his job. They then decided that their relationship was not working. A few weeks after their break-up, Mark invited Paige to an afternoon tea for Sonya (Eve Morey). But when she arrived she witnessed Mark engaging in "a heart-to-heart" with Rain Taylor (Airlee Dodds) and she left. Following Brad's advice, Paige told Mark that she loved him, but he explained that he did not feel the same way and probably never would. Valance told Alana Wulff of TV Week Soap Extra that being with Mark was the first time Paige had "ever fallen deeply in love". Even when he moved on with Naomi Canning (Morgana O'Reilly), Paige did not give up hope that he might reciprocate her feelings eventually.

The following year, Mark realised that he still had feelings for Paige, but did not act on them as he believed she was dating his brother Tyler (Travis Burns). When he learned Paige and Tyler were about to break up, he offered Paige his support. Paige then tried to kiss him, but he rejected her advances. Valance commented, "Paige still has deep feelings for Brennan, and it's very hard for her to keep them under wraps." The actress thought that Mark pulled away because he was scared to get involved while she was still with Tyler. Valance backed a reunion for Mark and Paige, telling Digital Spy's Sophie Dainty, "Paige just absolutely adores him. She completely loves him and even now that she is doing whatever with Tyler, deep down she is just completely besotted with Brennan." Valance stated that the relationship had become popular with viewers and wanted to work more with McGregor, who she felt she shared a good chemistry with. The couple did reunite after Paige "pours her heart out" to Mark following a stalking incident. Paige was "touched" when Mark came to check on her, but when he told her he was just doing his duty, she confronted him and they ended up kissing.

Mark and Paige later become engaged, after Paige proposed. Valance described the moment as "a bit of an accident" and thought it happened rather suddenly. The actress also pointed out that Paige was not sure about whether she wanted to get married, but she did want to be with Mark. When Paige started planning the wedding, she began to realise that she did want to get married and she became excited about it. Valance had fun picking out her character's wedding dress and she enjoyed having her hair and make-up done differently. Ahead of the wedding, Paige had been framed for several robberies, so she was unable to enjoy her hen party. She also told Lauren about her fears that Mark will soon find out what kind of woman he is marrying. On the day of the wedding, Paige assumed that she had gotten away with handling the stolen items. But when Mark turned up at the house, he arrested her in front of their friends and family. Mark then ended their relationship due to a lack of trust between them.

=== Tyler Brennan and working for Michelle Kim ===
Mark's younger brother Tyler began flirting with Paige after realising that Imogen did not have feelings for him. Paige initially told him that she would not be his second choice, but she later changed her mind. Tyler was wary that Paige was using him to get back at Mark, but Paige managed to assure him that she was genuinely interested in him. After spending the day flirting, Tyler and Paige kissed, but during the moment Paige called out Mark's name. Valance commented that it was just "a slip of the tongue" as she was constantly thinking about Mark. Paige and Tyler decided to just be friends. However, their attraction to one another grew stronger and they kissed again. Valance thought "Tyler and Paige were "too much alike", but they brought out the best in each other."

When Bailey took a stolen car from outside the garage, Paige reported it to the police and told Tyler. However, she was overheard by Michelle Kim (Ra Chapman), who ordered Paige and Tyler to give her $8000 or steal another car. Paige then learned Tyler was working for businessman Dennis Dimato (David Serafin) stripping stolen cars for parts. Michelle blackmailed Paige with video footage of Bailey stealing the car and then forced Paige into taking a job at the garage selling the stolen car parts. Paige and Tyler faked a relationship to cover up their illegal activities and tried to raise some money to pay off their debt by taking part in a bikini car wash. After realising that they made a good team, Tyler made a romantic advance towards Paige, but she rejected him. However, Paige later changed her mind and returned to the garage with the intention of having sex with Tyler, but she discovered he had already moved on with a customer. Valance told an Inside Soap columnist that Paige was better off with Tyler's brother, as she needed someone with more maturity.

Paige and Tyler tried to turn the garage into a legitimate business, but they soon realised that they were not rid of Dimato when his nephew Joey (Steven Sammut) left them a bag of money and Michelle ordered them to make a drop-off. When they discovered that a community fundraiser was taking place near the drop-off point, they decided to put the money in an old well and retrieve it later. However, they became stuck in the well when a crowd of people gathered nearby. During their rime in the well, Paige and Tyler gave into their feelings for each other. Paige later admitted that still had feelings for Mark and Tyler told her that he just wanted to be friends. Paige and Tyler later learned that there was $6000 missing from the bag and Tyler was beaten. When Nate Kinski (Meyne Wyatt) learned of their debt, he offered to lend them the money. Paige was unhappy that someone else had become involved, and Valance said "She's also annoyed that Tyler didn't discuss it with her first. They're heaping lie upon lie, and she feels that their situation is escalating."

At the end of the year, Michelle seeks Mark's help, while he believes she may be able to lead the police to Dimato. Paige was wary and Valance explained that when Michelle tells Paige she was trying to get away from Dimato, Paige does not believe her as she has been "badly burned" by her before. However, Paige began to feel sorry for Michelle when she says she does not feel safe at the caravan park, where the police have hidden her. Michelle also opens up to Paige about her past and how she has found religion. Mark warns Paige that Michelle is manipulating her, but she does not listen to him and goes off to meet Michelle. Paige was then kidnapped and locked in a car boot. Of the scenes, Valance said "Paige is terrified – and as soon as that boot closed on me, I got a real sense of what that would feel life. The whole thing shocks Paige, but she works out it has something to do with the Dimato situation." Paige managed to escape her captor by striking him over the head and running out of the door. But as she ran down the road, Paige was unaware of the speeding car behind her until it clipped her, leaving her unconscious.

Weeks later, Michelle came to Paige asking for her help as Dimato had been physically abusing her. Valance commented that Michelle was "a convincing victim" and Paige accepted that she needed help. Although Mark warned Paige that Michelle was playing her, Paige agreed to organise a SIM card in her name and a flat lease for Michelle. Valance told an Inside Soap columnist that Paige's sympathy for Michelle "clouds her judgement" and if she learnt Michelle was playing her, she would be very hurt. After a word from Paul Robinson (Stefan Dennis), Paige found the flat she leased for Michelle was full of stolen goods. During a "tussle" between the two women, Michelle managed to pin Paige to the ground and admitted that she was getting her revenge for Paige sending her to jail. Paul warns Paige that she needs to get rid of the stolen items as soon as possible, and Paige takes them to a charity bin, where she is almost caught by Mark. Paul later points out that Paige's plan is flawed and when she tries to get the items back, she finds them gone. Mark and Detective Ellen Crabb (Louise Crawford) find Paige's fingerprints on the items and learn that she has a second phone fill of incriminating message. Ellen tells Mark to bring Paige in for questioning.

=== Departure ===
In early 2017, Valance admitted to Holly Byrnes of the Herald Sun that while she wanted to pursue acting opportunities in London or Los Angeles, she would find it hard to make the decision to leave Neighbours, explaining "A lot of people don't get this opportunity, so I feel very lucky and very blessed to have been given this chance. To go and throw it away for the unknown ... it's going to be really hard because I've loved the cast, I love the crew." Valance also revealed that she had asked the producers not to kill her character off if she did leave, as she wanted to return for guest appearances. On 1 December 2017, a reporter for The Daily Telegraph confirmed Valance had filmed her final scenes that week, and would be leaving the show to pursue new acting roles. Valance's step-father Ross Wilson, who filmed a cameo in the same week, later confirmed that Valance felt it was time to move on and she would be moving to Los Angeles in January 2018. He added "It's an emotional week for her. I know there will be a few speeches and a lot of tears." Paige's exit scenes aired in March 2018.

=== Returns ===
On 24 November 2019, Neighbours confirmed that Valance would reprise the role for the serial's 35th anniversary celebrations. Valance was asked by executive producer Jason Herbison to return, but she only agreed upon hearing that McGregor was also returning. Paige returns on 24 February 2020, followed shortly after by Jack. It soon emerges that the couple's relationship is on the rocks and Paige suspects Jack may have had an affair. Paige and Jack later end their relationship and she reconciles with Mark, whom she marries as one of the five weddings featured as part of the serial's 35th anniversary. Valance commented that the wedding felt like "the happy ending we wanted for Paige and Mark all along." She also said that she was "so thrilled" upon hearing the storyline and revealed that Mark was the person she always wanted Paige to end up with.

On 4 May 2022, Zoe Thomaidou of Neos Kosmos announced Valance would reprise her role for the show's final episodes. Of her return, Valance stated: "Neighbours has always felt like home to me. It was my first acting job, and it taught me so much. There is a reason why everyone refers to Neighbours as the best training ground in the world." Herbison welcomed Valance back and commented "Paige Smith has an edge to her that is guaranteed to shake up things – stand by." Paige returned during the episode broadcast on 20 July in the UK and 25 July in Australia, as she comes back to Erinsborough with Chloe Brennan (April Rose Pengilly) to help sell Number 24.

== Storylines ==
After learning her biological parents, Lauren Turner and Brad Willis, came looking for her, Paige follows them to Erinsborough. Paige gets a job as a waitress at Lauren's cafe and moves in with Mark Brennan on Ramsay Street. She does not reveal her identity to her parents as she wants to get to know them first. Her behaviour makes Lauren and Brad's spouses, Matt and Terese, suspicious. Paige also struggles to get along with her half-sisters Amber and Imogen, but bonds with her half-brothers Josh and Bailey. When Paige feels Lauren has rejected her, she trashes Harold's Store. Ethan visits and encourages Paige to tell her family who she is. Paige learns Lauren's mother, Kathy, was responsible for her being adopted and decides to get revenge. When Kathy tells Paige she is getting too close to Lauren, Paige takes her heart medication. Kathy later finds Paige's sketchpad, which contains drawings of her family, and realises Paige is her granddaughter. Kathy has a heart attack and hits Toadfish Rebecchi with her car. Kathy's scarf restricts her breathing and Paige saves her. Paige decides to leave town, but Lauren catches up with her, finally knowing the truth. Lauren takes Paige to Brad and tells him they have found their daughter. Paige's half-siblings have mixed reactions to the news. Terese learns Paige trashed Harold's Store and Matt is forced to arrest her. Terese later drops the charges and tries to be more welcoming.

Paige and Brennan develop feelings for each other, but Brennan struggles to move on from his deceased fiancée Kate. After a few problems, Brennan and Paige eventually begin dating. Brennan starts acting secretively and Paige sees him kissing Dakota Davies. Brennan tells Paige that he was investigating Dakota along with the police. Realising that their relationship is not working, they break-up and Paige moves in with the Turners. When Paige admits that she still has feelings for Brennan, he tells her does not feel the same way. Paige strikes up an online relationship with Bryson Jennings (Brodie Derrick). Paige designs a logo for the Erinsborough Festival, but when her design is altered to cover up the female figure, but not the man, Paige stages a topless protest and the logo is changed back. When a large sum of money is stolen from the Turners, Bryson becomes the prime suspect. Paige invites him to meet her and after his arrival, Bryson is questioned by the police and cleared. Bryson realises Paige is not interested in him romantically and leaves. Bailey later admits that it was his fault the money was taken. Paige almost has sex with Brennan's brother, Tyler, but she leaves after realising she still loves Brennan. She and Tyler later kiss again, and Paige says Brennan's name in the heat of the moment. She apologises and they agree to be friends.

Paige sees Tyler checking out a car to steal, and later discovers that the same car was involved in a hit-and-run on Matt the same day. She finds the car at the garage and accuses Tyler, but Danni Ferguson (Laura McIntosh) admits she did it. Matt dies of his injuries. While supporting her family, Paige calls Lauren "mum" for the first time. She later accuses Imogen of spending too much time with Daniel and tells her to let him concentrate on Amber. She later realises that she has been unfairly taking out her anger on Imogen. Bailey takes a car from the garage, leading Paige to discover that it was already stolen and was part of an illegal car ring. She is blackmailed by Michelle Kim into helping Tyler raise $8,000 and is made manager of the garage. Tyler makes it clear he has feelings for Paige, but she tells him she is still in love with his brother. When Paige becomes jealous of Brennan's new relationship, she asks Tyler out, but then finds him with another woman. Paige tries to make the garage a legitimate business, but Joey Dimato soon leaves them with a bag of money. Paige and Tyler throw the bag down a well and when they go to retrieve it, they kiss. They later discover some of the money has been stolen. Paige suspects Jayden Warley (Khan Oxenham), but it turns out to be Glen Darby (Luke Jacka). When Tyler is beaten, he refuses to let Paige take him to the hospital, so she steals a prescription from Karl Kennedy (Alan Fletcher) for strong painkillers.

When Nate Kinski is almost attacked by the man who beat Tyler, they tell him everything and he pays their debt. Jayden tries to blackmail Paige into having sex, but she gives him strawberries laced with laxatives, and then threatens to release a video of him relieving himself outside if he does not leave her alone. Brennan admits that he has feelings for Paige, but refuses to act on them out of respect to Tyler. Paige plans to get Lauren and Brad back together, but Terese learns of the plan when she sees a text message from Ethan. Paige celebrates her 21st birthday at The Waterhole and her adoptive mother, Mary (Gina Liano) turns up unexpectedly. Paige claims Mary neglected her, while Brad and Lauren try to get them to reconcile. Paige eventually confronts Mary about the time she overheard her saying she ruined everything. Mary explains that she had just learned that Paige was stolen from Lauren and her husband had lied to her. They reconcile and Mary invites Paige to go to Singapore. When Tyler disappears Paige tells Brennan about her part in the stolen car ring. They find Tyler, and Dimato and his gang are arrested, with the exception of Joey. Brad confronts Paige when Terese tells him about the plan to get him and Lauren back together. Paige apologises to Terese. She fears Joey is after revenge, and he later holds Paige hostage in her back yard. Paige manages to overpower Joey and ties him up, before he is arrested. Paige confronts Mark about his feelings for her and they get back together.

Paige helps Tyler to track down items stolen from the garage and he kisses her. She makes it clear that she loves Mark, but Amber suggests that she is too flirty and might be dating the wrong brother. Mark asks Paige about them having children, and when she confesses she does not want them for a long time, it makes things awkward between the couple. Paige helps out at the Erinsborough High sleep-out protect, and ends up trapped in a lift with Tyler when a fire breaks out. Tyler confesses his love for her, and she admits that though she loves Mark there is something drawing them together. Tyler then passes out, but they are both rescued by Mark. After discussing their future, Mark and Paige get engaged. When Dimato is released, Michelle asks Paige to help her escape him. Paige goes to meet Michelle, but is knocked out and abducted by a man who mistakes her for Michelle. She escapes but whilst fleeing is hit by a car. Her injuries aren't serious and Michelle visits her in hospital. Later Mark urges her to marry him as soon as possible. Paige tells Mark she will have no more contact with Michelle, but then Michelle turns up with a bruised face in Paige's back yard. Paige finds accommodation for Michelle, who she thinks is turning her life around, but actually is still working for Dimato, and is trying to frame her for theft. After Paige learns the truth, Paul Robinson (Stefan Dennis) blackmails Dimato into leaving town and advises Paige to hide the stolen items. She disposes of them in a charity bin, but they are found by the police. Mark arrests Paige on their wedding after learning her fingerprints were found on the items, and she explains everything to him. Furious at her for lying to him again after promising they would have no secrets, Mark calls off the wedding.

After a brief trip to Singapore with Mary to deal with her heartbreak, Paige enrols in a fine arts course at Eden Hill university, hoping to find some direction in her life. She tells Mark she does not want to get back together, believing they are too different. In an attempt to move on from Mark, Paige agrees to a blind date and Courtney Grixti (Emma Lane) sets up her up with their older university lecturer Noel Creighton (Kristian Beddow). When the boiler at Lassiter's Hotel explodes, Paige is saved by a John Doe (Andrew Morley). Wanting to thank him, Paige stays by his beside until he wakes up. John suffers from amnesia and does not know who he is. Paige decides to help him recover his memories and she eventually falls in love with him. John's memories return and he tells Paige that his name is Jack Callahan and that he is a priest. Paige tries to seduce Jack, who struggles to choose between his faith and pursuing a relationship with her. Jack sees Paige kissing Dustin Oliver (Kevin Clayette), causing tension between them. Jack eventually chooses the church over Paige. To deal with her grief, Paige throws a party and begins a casual relationship with Tyler, upsetting her sister Piper Willis (Mavournee Hazel), who is in love with Tyler. Paige ends the relationship with Tyler in order to spend time with Jack and learn about his work as a priest.

Paige pursues a boxing career, with Tyler helping to coach her and Aaron Brennan (Matt Wilson) as her manager. Paige's first boxing opponent is Angelina Jackson (Sarah Howett), who Aaron thinks is too strong. Paige contemplates pulling out, until she learns Aaron will go into debt if the fight is cancelled. During the fight, Angelina gets the upper hand, but Paige manages to knock her out. However, Angelina suffers a brain haemorrhage and Paige blames herself, until the doctors discover Angelina had a brain tumour. Paige bonds with Angelina's sister, Nikki Jackson (Tiarnie Coupland) and helps out at Blaze Outreach. Jack once again rejects Paige for his faith. Out of anger, Paige dresses up as a nun for Lauren's hen's night, which Jack sees. During a hot-air balloon ride the following day, Paige tells Lauren all of the things she wants to say to Jack, which Piper records and sends to him. The burners go out and as the balloon descends, Paige decides to jump from the basket. Jack finds her on the shore of a dam and takes her to a nearby shack to warm up, as she is suffering from hypothermia. They consummate their relationship, before being found by Brad. Jack leaves town to gather his thoughts, but when he tells Paige that he needs more time, she tells him she is done with their relationship. Jack's childhood sweetheart Simone Bader (Kahli Williams) comes to visit him and asks Paige to let him go, because she is in love with him.

Paige worries that some people are put off attending Blaze because of its connection to the church. She clashes with Jack over her plans to display material about sex education and LGBT issues. A council meeting gives control of Blaze to the church, and Paige and Jack fall out. After feeling overemotional, Paige takes a pregnancy test and learns she is pregnant with Jack's child. During a night out in the city with David Tanaka (Takaya Honda), Paige starts spotting and worries she is having a miscarriage, but an ultrasound shows the baby is okay. Paige tells her family about the pregnancy, but refuses to name the father. David later offers to say he is the father and Paige agrees. She later allows David to end the pretence early. She then confirms to Brad and Lauren that Jack is the father of the baby, but she struggles to tell Jack the truth. Paige decides to move to Queensland with her parents. She is involved in a car accident, and has to be cut free from her car. Before she is taken into surgery, Paige tells Jack that he is the father of her baby. Brad and Lauren announce that they are moving to the Gold Coast, and Paige decides to join them and raise her baby there without Jack's help, but Jack convinces her to stay as he wants to be in the baby's life. Paige drinks a tea made from mushrooms, and has to be taken to the hospital, where Jack blames Piper for not looking after Paige. Mark invites Paige to move into Number 24, after she admits that she is lonely at home. Paige learns the baby is breech and she worries about becoming a mother. The ladies of Ramsay Street form a club to support her. Paige returns to the shack where the baby was conceived and she goes into labour. Karl and Jack find her and she gives birth to a son. She then loses consciousness and is rushed to hospital for surgery. Lauren returns to support Paige and Jack. Paige names their son Gabriel (Kian Bafekrpour). Paige learns that Amber has a burst appendix and accompanies Lauren to Queensland to help out. Paige returns to find Jack has left the church. She decides to move in with Terese and Piper at Number 22. It soon emerges that Mark visited Paige in Queensland and they kissed, but Paige told him it was a mistake. Paige rejects Jack and realises that she has feelings for Mark. While Paige is at home with Terese and Gabe, a Specialist Response Group enter the house having been called about a baby being threatened with a knife. The call is found to have been made by Piper's online troll.

Paige puts a note on the new wishing tree about her continuing feelings for Mark. Elly, who is dating Mark, sees it and thinks Steph wrote it. When she learns it was written by Paige, Elly estranges herself from her and Mark, but eventually reconciles with them and sets them up together. Jack becomes jealous of Paige and Mark, thinking Mark is becoming a replacement father for Gabe. When Mark is investigated for tampering with evidence, he and Paige fall out as she is angry he covered up Sonya's crimes but arrested her on their wedding day. Jack also asks Mark to stay away from Gabe, as he is a suspect in Hamish Roche's (Sean Taylor) murder. After taking an ill Gabe to a medical centre on Christmas Day, he is kidnapped by Louise McLeod (Maria Theodorakis), who steals Paige's car. Louise contacts Mark to demand $20,000 and a fake passport for Gabe's safe return. After Louise is arrested she refuses to reveal the whereabouts of Gabe, but the baby is left on Paige's front door step by an unknown person, later revealed to be Cassius Grady. Gabe's kidnapping ultimately pushes Paige and Jack back together, culminating in them having sex a month later. Mark proposes to Paige, forcing her to confess that she had sex with Jack. They attempt to stay together, but ultimately decide it is too difficult. Paige and Jack eventually reunite, but their relationship proves too difficult for Mark and Jack's girlfriend Steph Scully (Carla Bonner) to deal with. They decide to make a fresh start in Queensland, near Paige's family.

Two years later, Paige returns to Erinsborough alone and is attacked by her cousin, Roxy Willis (Zima Anderson), who believes Paige is breaking into her house. Paige tells Terese that she thinks Jack is having an affair. Jack later joins her and reveals that he wants to go back into the priesthood, leading to their amicable break up. Paige spends time with Mark, who has returned for work, and Aaron and Chloe Brennan conspire to set them up together. After a few dates, Paige proposes to Mark at the Lassiters Wedding Expo and he accepts. After another couple drop out of their wedding, Mark and Paige take their place. Jack brings Gabe to Erinsborough and Mark and Paige marry. Paige is also surprised to learn that Terese and Paul are now married. Paige soon returns to Queensland to pack up her house and move to Adelaide, while Mark stays behind for work. Paige rings Mark while he is still in Erinsborough and tells him she is pregnant. Shortly before Christmas, David and Aaron receive news from Mark that Paige has given birth to a son called Freddie.

Two years later, Paige returns to help Chloe Brennan sell her house as a real estate agent and meets Chloe's housemates. She tells Terese that it will be her first job as a real estate agent and Paige plays with her niece, Isla Tanaka-Brennan (Mary Finn). Paige also tells Terese that she is surprised that she is now dating Paul's half-brother, Glen Donnelly (Richard Huggett), while Glen's daughter, Kiri Durant (Gemma Bird Matheson), listens in. Paige gets an offer on Chloe's house from Izzy Hoyland (Natalie Bassingthwaite), Susan's nemesis, and Paige asks Izzy if Susan would accept her living on the same street. Paige helps Toadie Rebecchi (Ryan Moloney), Terese and Wendy Rodwell (Candice Leask) erect sale signs on their front lawns. Paige continuously notices Terese thinking about Paul and teams up with Roxy to get Terese to admit she still loves Paul and to reunite the couple. They overhear Terese defending Paul in front of Glen and Terese later tells Glen that she still loves Paul. Paul and Terese rekindle their marriage and Paige sells Shane's house, however the other residents decide to stay. Paige and Lauren attend Toadie's wedding to Melanie Pearson (Lucinda Cowden), then attends their reception on Ramsay Street.

== Reception ==
For her portrayal of Paige, Valance received a nomination for the Logie Award for Most Popular New Talent in 2015. She was also nominated for Best Daytime Star at the Inside Soap Awards. Paige and her storylines have received mostly positive attention from critics. A reporter for the Daily Record observed that Paige's arrival "ruffles some feathers". Kirsty Nutkins from the Daily Express quipped "Paige Smith has been causing quite a stir since her arrival in Ramsay Street". Digital Spy's Daniel Kilkelly praised Valance's addition to the cast, calling her a "standout" despite her lack of acting experience. He also thought Paige had "an instant and distinctive presence on screen". A reporter for The Age branded Paige "mysterious and cranky". Glen Williams from TV Week disliked Paige's lies, saying her "conniving deceit is simply chilling". While his colleague Stephen Downie thought Paige was "probably the last person you'd go to for advice."

A Soap World columnist noted that Neighbours had "mastered the art of big event storytelling" with plots such as the Paige reveal. All About Soap's Claire Crick was a fan of Paige and Brennan's romance, commenting "It's sad Kate died, but we can't help but love the new Prennan romance, it's about time someone put a smile on Mark's oh-so handsome face and there's no denying they make possibly one of the best-looking couples ever to grace Ramsay Street!" During a review of 2014, Kilkelly commented "We've been gripped by the huge repercussions from Paige's arrival in Erinsborough". In 2015, Kerry Barrett from All About Soap placed Paige at number 28 on the magazine's list of 30 favourite Neighbours characters. Barrett quipped that Paige "caused quite a stir in Erinsborough!" and thought her best moment was "revealing her true identity to mum Lauren." Melinda Houston of The Sydney Morning Herald was not a fan of the character, saying "she's certainly proved herself psychopathically untrustworthy and the latest carry-on looks highly suss."

In December 2015, Ethan Sills of The Spin Off said that Paige was "probably the show's best character right now" and Valance would "most likely" go to Hollywood the following year. At the start of 2016, Alana Wulff from the Herald Sun quipped "Poor Paige (Olympia Valance) hasn't had an easy run of it lately. From love triangles to school fires, it hasn't been fun. When a bruised and battered Michelle shows up begging for a place to stay, Paige can't say no." Of Mark and Paige's doomed wedding, Crick (All About Soap) quipped, "Wow! We thought we'd seen it all when it comes to soap weddings here at All About Soap – but never before have we seen a groom arrest the bride just moments before the ceremony is about to start!" Crick went on to say that the wedding would "go down in Erinsborough history" for the wrong reasons, and that she thought Mark and Paige seemed like they were "made to be". A Herald Sun reporter included Lauren discovering Paige's existence in their "Neighbours' 30 most memorable moments" feature.
