= Joel Christensen =

American classical scholar

Joel P. Christensen
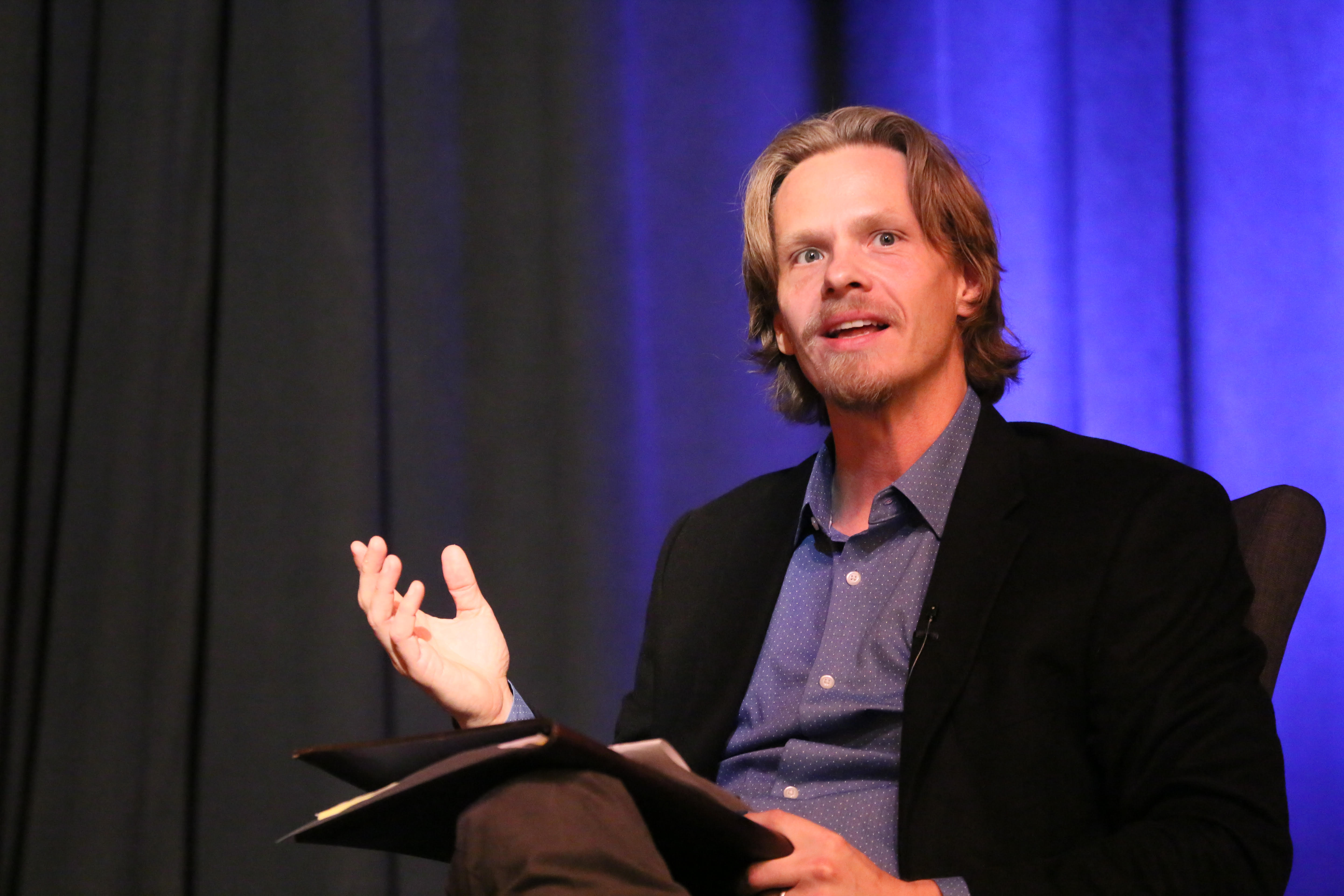
- Christensen in 2019
- Occupation: Classicist

Academic background
- Education: New York University; Brandeis University
- Thesis: The Failure of Speech: Rhetoric and Politics in the Iliad (2007)
- Academic advisor: David Sider

Academic work
- Discipline: Classics
- Sub-discipline: ancient literature and myth, particularly Homer
- Institutions: University of Texas at San Antonio; City University New York; Brandeis University

Joel P. Christensen is an American academic and classics scholar. He is the Provost and Senior Vice President for Academic Affairs at the CUNY Graduate Center in New York, where he also serves as Professor of Classical Studies. He previously served as Senior Associate Provost for Faculty Affairs at Brandeis University.

His research focuses on language, myth, literature, Homer, and the translation of ancient texts, particularly through the blog "Sententiae Antiquae". Christensen is a regular contributor to the newspaper Neos Kosmos.

== Education ==
Christensen received his PhD in Classics from New York University in 2007. His doctoral thesis was The Failure of Speech: Rhetoric and Politics in the Iliad. His supervisor for the dissertation was Professor David Sider. He received his BA and MA (2001) from Brandeis University in 2001, where he was a major in Classics and English.

== Career and research ==
Christensen taught at the University of Texas at San Antonio 2007–2016. He taught at Brandeis University, and became a Professor of Classical Studies. He was promoted to Senior Associate Provost for Faculty Affairs, School of Arts and Sciences, at Brandeis University, in 2024. In June 2025, Christensen was appointed Provost and Senior Vice President for Academic Affairs at the CUNY Graduate Center in New York and Professor of Classical Studies.

Christensen publishes on Greek epic and myth. He published the book Homer: A Beginner’s Guide to Homer in 2013, co-authored with Elton Barker. He published the book Homer’s Thebes: Epic Rivalries and the Appropriation of Mythical Pasts, with Harvard University Press, again co-authored with Barker, in 2019. He published A Commentary on the Homeric Battle of Frogs and Mice with Bloomsbury in 2018, co-written with Erik Robinson. In 2020, his book The Many-Minded Man: The Odyssey, Psychology, and the Therapy of Epic came out with Cornell University Press. In 2023, he contributed to the edited volume The Oxford Critical Guide to Homer's Iliad. He has published numerous journal articles, including those in Classical World and Arethusa. His second monograph, Storylife: On Epic, Narrative, and Living Things, came out with Yale University Press in 2025. Prior to the release of Christopher Nolan's film, The Odyssey (2026), Christensen published his third monograph, Why Odysseus: Survivor, Scoundrel, and (Anti)hero in July 2026.

Christensen was a Fellow at the Center for Hellenic Studies in 2013 and in the same year received the Society for Classical Studies’ Award for Excellence in Teaching at the Collegiate Level.

Christensen has a classics blog that provides original translations and analysis of ancient texts called Sententiae Antiquae. He has done numerous radio spots, including WNPR’s The Colin McEnroe Show, and a podcast for the Getting Curious with Jonathan Van Ness show called "What Were The Very First Olympics Like?" with Professors Sarah E. Bond and Joel Christensen. He has written for Inside Higher Ed and other public media. He writes regularly for Neos Kosmos and The Conversation. He has written for the Los Angeles Review of Books and done numerous webinars on Homer. In partnership with Out of Chaos Theatre, the Center for Hellenic Studies, and the Kosmos Society, he served as the host and faculty consultant for Reading Greek Tragedy Online, a series that performs Greek tragedy online through YouTube.
