= Blood, Sweat and Gears =

- Presented by: Scott McGregor
- Starring: "Series 2" Shane Soutter, Murry Forman, Sean Fardell, Aleksandar Ninovic Shane Kennett .Darryl Jhinku, Brendan Findlay, George Isaac
- Judges: Ian Luff; Nathan Luck; Samantha Stevens
- Country of origin: Australia
- Original language: English
- No. of seasons: 2

Production
- Production location: Shepparton Vic

Original release
- Network: Fox8
- Release: 18 January 2008 – 2009

Blood, Sweat and Gears is an Australian television series that airs on Fox8. It debuted on 18 January 2008, and is hosted by Scott McGregor, and judged by Ian Luff and Nathan Luck. In Season II 2009, Luck was replaced with Samantha Stevens.

The show featured seven contestants who took part in multiple challenges across an eight-week period.

== Reception ==
Brad Newsome of The Age praised the show's second season, calling it "still good fun, with a bunch of good-humoured blokes putting their hotted-up cars through rubber-burning challenges". Peter Vincent, another writer for The Age said Luff, a judge on the show was "the real TV talent", "who relished constantly stirring the pot". Vincent concluded, "Top Gear it may not be but in some ways it's a more honest show, in that it puts the car owners out in front of their cars, letting them be themselves." In a positive review, The Weekend Australian reviewer Ian Cuthbertson wrote, "There are too few places on TV where men can get together to be boys. McGregor and his team have created exactly that, and done it with flair, innovation and buckets of blokey charm."
