= Dimitri Gogos =

Greek-Australian journalist and editor (1931–2019)

- Born: February 13, 1931; Chios
- Died: May 20, 2019 (aged 88)
- Occupation(s): Journalist, editor
- Years active: 1957–2019
- Known for: Founding Neos Kosmos
- Relatives: Olympia Valance (granddaughter)

Dimitri Gogos (13 February 1931 – 20 May 2019) was a Greek-Australian journalist and editor known for founding the Melbourne-based Greek community newspaper Neos Kosmos.

== Early life ==
Dimitri Gogos was born in Chios on February 13, 1931, to Greek immigrants from Asia-Minor. In 1950, he immigrated to Melbourne, Australia, where he worked as a waiter and busboy before finding work in various factories, including General Motors Holden. Gogos later reflected that he experienced discrimination as a Greek immigrant teenager in Australia. After working a stint at the Australia Post, he began working as a reporter and journalist in his spare time for publications like The Olympic Youth Club, The Australian Greek Review and The Australian Greek.

== Career ==
In 1957, Gogos bought the Greek Communist newspaper Australoellinas, and was its sole editor. He later founded his own newspaper Neos Kosmos. The first edition of Neos Kosmos was published on February 13, 1957, the occasion of Gogos' 26th birthday. Gogos was an advocate for Hellenic culture and the rights of Greek workers, and his political position greatly influenced Neos Kosmos.

== Personal life ==
He is the grandfather of Australian actress Olympia Valance.
