= Ariel Kaplan =

Australian actress, singer and dancer (born 1994)

- Born: Ariel Erin Kaplan; 4 May 1994 (age 32); Johannesburg, South Africa
- Occupations: Actress, singer, dancer
- Years active: 1998–present
- Relatives: Gemma-Ashley Kaplan (sister); Dena Kaplan (sister)

Ariel Erin Kaplan (born 4 May 1994) is a South African-born Australian actress, singer and dancer. She is known for her roles as Lisa Atwood in the third season of children's series The Saddle Club and Imogen Willis in the Australian soap opera Neighbours.

== Early life ==
Ariel Erin Kaplan was born in South Africa on 4 May 1994. Kaplan comes from a Jewish family of performers; her father is a musician, her grandfather was an actor and her grandmother was a professional ballerina. Her two older sisters Gemma-Ashley Kaplan and Dena Kaplan are also actresses. Dena Kaplan is best known for her role as Abigail Armstrong on Dance Academy. Aside from acting, Kaplan also had extensive training in dancing and singing. She studied various dance styles such as jazz, contemporary, ballet and tap at the Jane Moore Academy of Ballet in Melbourne from 1998 until 2011. Kaplan was home schooled through distance education.

== Career ==
As a child, Kaplan appeared in several Australian theatre productions, including Joseph and the Amazing Technicolor Dreamcoat, The Sound of Music, Oedipus, Annie and Les Miserables. In 2002 and 2003, she played the role of Florence in IMG's production of Oliver! in both Melbourne and Singapore. Between 2003 and 2004, Kaplan had minor roles in sketch comedy shows Skithouse and The Hamish & Andy Show, and appeared in the short film The Mischief Maker. In 2005 and 2006, she played the role of Young Nala in Disney Theatrical's production of The Lion King for both the Melbourne and Shanghai seasons.

Kaplan's first major television role came in 2007, when she took over the role of Lisa Atwood for the third season of The Saddle Club. The third season was filmed from November 2007 to May 2008, and premiered in March 2009. Kaplan recorded several songs for the show's accompanying album Best Friends. Between 2009 and 2012, she made guest appearances in television shows John Safran's Race Relations and Tangle, and appeared in the theatre production Grey Gardens as Jacqueline Bouvier.

In February 2013, it was announced that Kaplan had joined the cast of the long-running soap opera Neighbours as Imogen Willis. She won the role after a quick audition process, which included one audition and a screen test with cast members Harley Bonner, Rebekah Elmaloglou and Kip Gamblin. Kaplan made her first appearance as Imogen on 20 May 2013. Kaplan left her role as Imogen on 26 April 2016 to pursue other projects Kaplan reprised the role of Imogen on 22 March 2019 for a guest stint and later for the series reboot in 2023.

== Filmography ==
Film and television
Year	Title	Role	Notes
2003	Skithouse	Barbie Cops girl	
2003–2004	Skithouse	Bit part	
2004	The Hamish & Andy Show	Extra	
2004	The Mischief Maker	Sottise	Short film
2008-2009	The Saddle Club	Elizabeth "Lisa" Atwood	Main: 26 Episodes
2009	John Safran's Race Relations	Lyla	
2011	Shaolin	Shengnan (English dub)	Film
2012	Tangle	School Girl #1	Season 3, episode 2
2012	Odin's Eye	Xiaolong (English dub)	Film
2013–2016, 2019, 2023	Neighbours	Imogen Willis	Main cast: 416 Episodes

== Awards and nominations ==
Year	Award	Category	Work	Result	Ref.
2015	TV Week and Soap Extra #OMGAwards	Best Shock Kiss (Daniel and Imogen)	Neighbours	Nominated	
2015	TV Week and Soap Extra #OMGAwards	Best BFFs (Imogen and Amber)	Neighbours	Nominated	
