= Olympia Valance =

Australian actress and model (born 1993)

- Born: Olympia Montana Vukadinović; 7 January 1993 (age 33); Melbourne, Victoria, Australia
- Occupations: Actress; model
- Years active: 2012–present
- Spouse: Tom Bellchambers (m. 2022)
- Children: 1
- Relatives: Ross Wilson (musician) (Step Father) Holly Valance (half-sister); Dimitri Gogos (grandfather)

Olympia Montana Valance (born 7 January 1993) is an Australian actress and model, whose roles include Paige Smith in the soap opera Neighbours (2014–2018, 2020, 2022) and Tahlia Woods in Playing for Keeps. For her role as Paige, Valance received a nomination for the Logie Award for Most Popular New Talent.

== Early life ==
Olympia Valance was born in Melbourne, Victoria on 7 January 1993 to Rajko Vukadinović, a model and musician, and Tania Gogos. Valance's father is Serb from Montenegro and her mother is Australian of Greek descent, the daughter of journalist Dimitri Gogos. Her step-father is Australian music legend Ross Wilson. Valance has seven half-siblings; Her older half-sister Holly Valance, with whom she shares Vukadinović as a father, is also a singer and an actress. Valance attended Shelford Girls' Grammar School and studied at the Melbourne Actor's Lab.

== Career ==
In March 2014, it was announced that Valance would make her acting debut in the long-running soap opera Neighbours as Paige Smith. Valance had been a successful model prior to her casting and won the role after going through a long audition process, which included four call-backs. Her half-sister Holly previously appeared in the show as Felicity "Flick" Scully from 1999 until 2002. Valance was initially contracted for three years and she made her screen debut as Paige on 2 June 2014. Valance's portrayal of Paige earned her nominations for Most Popular New Talent at the Logie Awards and Best Daytime Star at the Inside Soap Awards in 2015. She appeared in a documentary special celebrating the show's 30th anniversary titled Neighbours 30th: The Stars Reunite, which aired in Australia and the United Kingdom in March 2015.

In December 2014, Valance became the new face and body of UK lingerie brand Gossard. Of her role, she said "The last year has been a whirlwind and to work with such an established name as Gossard is a dream come true. I absolutely love working on Neighbours and the fact that I am able to come over to England and do an incredible campaign like this is a credit to the show's following, both here and down under." Valance has appeared in photo shoots for the brand's swimwear and lingerie collections, including their 2015 spring/summer campaign. In July 2015, she became an ambassador for the Australian chocolate bar Cherry Ripe.

In January 2016, Valance was the ambassador of the Jeep Marquee for the annual Jeep Portsea Polo event. That same month, she revealed that she signed with California-based agency Roar after they came looking for her. The agency also looks after fellow Australian actors Liam and Chris Hemsworth, who have both had successful careers in Hollywood. Valance has expressed an interest in moving on from Neighbours once her three-year contract ends. On 1 December 2017, it was announced that Valance had filmed her last scenes as Paige. Wilson confirmed that Valance would be moving to Los Angeles in January 2018 to pursue film and television roles during pilot season.

Valance joined the cast of Network Ten's sports drama Playing for Keeps in May 2018. She plays Tahlia, a socialite who is engaged to the captain of an Australian rules football team. In January 2019, Network Ten announced Valance would compete on the sixteenth season of Dancing with the Stars. Valance was paired with professional dancer Jarryd Byrne. On 18 March 2019, they became the fourth pair to be eliminated, despite receiving a high score from the judges for their jive. Valance then appeared in the crime drama Informer 3838.

In 2020, Valance reprised her role as Paige for Neighbours' 35th anniversary. Valance was announced as a judge for the 2020 season of Australia's Got Talent, however due to the COVID-19 pandemic she never fulfilled the role. On 4 May 2022, Valance confirmed to Zoe Thomaidou of Neos Kosmos that she would be returning to Neighbours for the serial's final episodes. The following year, Valance appeared in the British-Australian thriller series Heat as Sergeant Angelos. She also joined the cast of the Netflix teen drama Surviving Summer.

In May 2024, Valance took part in the second season of the Nine Network reality show The Summit.

== Personal life ==
Valance announced in June 2019 that she was in a relationship with AFL footballer Tom Bellchambers. The couple announced their engagement in October 2020, and they married on 12 June 2022 in Daylesford. In July 2023, Valance revealed that she had miscarried twins during the COVID-19 pandemic, and that she and Bellchambers were undergoing IVF after struggling to conceive for two years. In August 2024, Valance announced that she was 25 weeks pregnant with her and Bellchambers' first child, and she gave birth to their son on 3 December 2024.

In August 2020, Valance reported that in 2019 she was a victim of a cyber crime. Her phone was hacked and personal images were distributed without her consent.

Valance is the co-owner of Splash Vodka.

A lover of horse racing, Valance part-owns a horse named Mr. Sneaky that competed in the Spring Racing Carnival. In 2020, Valance was announced as a Caulfield Cup Carnival ambassador and judge of the Social Style Stakes.

== Filmography ==
Year	Title	Role	Notes
2014–2018, 2020, 2022	Neighbours	Paige Smith	Main cast
2015	Hey Piper	Paige Smith	Webseries
2015	Neighbours 30th: The Stars Reunite	Herself	Documentary
2016	All Star Family Feud	Herself	Season 1, Episode 4
2017	Have You Been Paying Attention?	Herself	Guest Quiz Master
2017	Ghetto Heaven	Jaye Patrice	
2018–2019	Playing for Keeps	Tahlia Woods	Main cast
2019	Dancing with the Stars	Herself	Contestant
2019	Hughesy, We Have a Problem	Herself	Celebrity problem
2019	Celebrity Name Game	Herself	2 episodes
2020	Informer 3838	Emma Darlington	2 episodes
2022	Dancing with the Stars: All Stars	Herself	Contestant
2023	Heat	Sergeant Demi Angelos	Miniseries
2023	Surviving Summer	Elo Radic	
2024	The Summit	Herself	

== Awards and nominations ==
Year	Award	Category	Work	Result	Ref.
2015	Logie Awards	Most Popular New Talent	Neighbours	Nominated	
2015	Inside Soap Awards	Best Daytime Star	Neighbours	Nominated	
