= Neos Kosmos (newspaper) =

Australian newspaper

- Type: Biweekly newspaper
- Format: Broadsheet and tabloid
- Owner: Ethnic Publications Pty. Ltd.
- Founders: Dimitri Gogos; Bill Stefanou; Alekos Doukas
- Editor: Sotiris Hatzimanolis
- Founded: 1957; 69 years ago
- Headquarters: Melbourne, Australia
- Website: www.neoskosmos.com

Neos Kosmos is a national Greek community newspaper in Melbourne, Australia.

== History ==
Founded in 1957 by Dimitri Gogos, Bill Stefanou and noted author Alekos Doukas. The newspaper is published by Ethnic Publications Pty Ltd.

In its early days, the newspaper was heavily left-leaning, and was considered radical by the Greek community in Australia although it soon grew in popularity. Neos Kosmos was known to advocate for issues which impacted the Greek community, like unionization and worker's rights.

The paper was monitored by the Australian Security Intelligence Organisation during the Vietnam War, due to its frequent publication of anti-conscription and anti-war sentiments.

It has been published in Greek as a broadsheet on Monday and Thursday and as a tabloid in English and Greek on Saturday since August 2010.

Neos Kosmos has received two Multicultural Media Awards, for best print publication and a high commendation for a print article in Sydney, New South Wales, in 2014.
