= Scott McGregor (actor) =

Model and actor

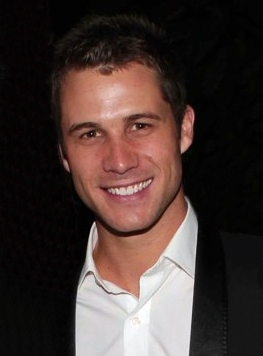
- McGregor in 2011
- Born: April 1981 (age 45); Albury, New South Wales, Australia
- Occupations: Model, actor, television presenter
- Years active: 2005–present (modelling); 2008–present (acting)
- Spouse: Bianka Voigt (m. 2019)
- Children: 2
- Modelling information
- Height: 6 ft 1 in (1.85 m)
- Hair colour: Brown
- Eye colour: Brown
- Agency: Chadwick Models

Scott McGregor (born April 1981) is an Australian model, television presenter and actor. McGregor worked as a model on the game show Temptation. He has also appeared in television commercials and print advertisements. From 2008, McGregor hosted the motoring show Blood, Sweat and Gears. As an actor, he has appeared in Underbelly, Winners & Losers and Offspring. McGregor joined the cast of Neighbours as Detective Mark Brennan in 2010. He departed the show the following year to pursue other career opportunities, before returning in 2013 for a guest stint. He returned in 2014 in a regular capacity, until his departure in 2019. He reprised the role once more the following year.

== Early life ==
McGregor was born in Albury, New South Wales. He has four brothers. McGregor studied graphic design and worked part-time for Melbourne advertising company Visual Jazz. He did some modelling while studying to earn extra money and meet new people.

== Career ==
=== Modelling ===
From 2005, McGregor worked as a model on the Nine Network programme Temptation. McGregor has done photo shoots for Men's Health Australia, Cleo, DNA and Boyfriend, as well as television commercials for a beer product and print advertisements for a range of products including clothing and underwear. In 2006, McGregor was a contestant in Cleo's Bachelor of the Year contest. McGregor was named one of fifty finalists in the 2011 contest.

In 2016, McGregor became a brand ambassador for men's underwear company Noble by Noble.

=== Acting and presenting ===
In January 2008, McGregor began presenting the motoring show Blood, Sweat and Gears on Foxtel's Fox8. That same year, he appeared in an episode of Underbelly. McGregor has also appeared in Carla Cametti PD (2009), and the drama series Winners & Losers (2011).

McGregor joined the cast of the soap opera Neighbours as Detective Detective Mark Brennan in 2010. McGregor was initially contracted for six months, but this was later extended to a year. McGregor left Neighbours in April 2011. He revealed that he wanted to pursue modelling opportunities in Europe and new acting roles. McGregor said he would not rule out returning to the show. In April 2012, McGregor made a guest appearance in the third season of Offspring as Theo.

On 4 November 2012, it was confirmed that McGregor would be returning to Neighbours in May 2013 for a brief stint. McGregor reprised the role again in October 2013 and made his screen return in February 2014. He appeared in a documentary special celebrating the show's 30th anniversary titled Neighbours 30th: The Stars Reunite, which aired in Australia and the UK in March 2015. In August 2019, it was announced that McGregor had decided to leave Neighbours for a second time.

== Personal life ==
McGregor dated his Temptation co-model Chelsea Butler from November 2006 to 2011. In May 2016, McGregor became engaged to his partner Bianka Voigt. On 27 March 2017, McGregor announced that he and Voigt were expecting their first child, and Voigt gave birth to their daughter on 27 September 2017. McGregor and Voigt married in January 2019. Their second child, a son, was born in January 2020.

McGregor's hobbies include surfing, Australian rules football, cricket, golf, poker and music.

In April 2019, McGregor was glassed by a stripper, Danielle Lee, during a verbal altercation at Hollywood Showgirls in Surfers Paradise, which left him with a cut lip. During a hearing at Southport Magistrates Court on 20 August, the defence said McGregor was "intoxicated and verbally abusive" towards the exotic dancer, which he denied. McGregor stated that he turned down a private dance, which is when the glass was thrown. He was unable to recall how much alcohol he had consumed, but he was not drunk. The court also heard that McGregor "has a history of public drunkenness and aggression towards women, and police had previously been called to the Melbourne home of his ex-girlfriend." The trial was adjourned until 8 October 2019. Lee was found guilty. She was given a good behaviour bond and ordered to pay for McGregor's medical costs.

In November 2022, McGregor was charged with one count of sexual assault after an alleged incident at the Esplanade Hotel in St Kilda on 20 February 2022. In August 2023, McGregor was granted diversion in Melbourne Magistrates Court, keeping the charge out of the formal court system. Diversion means he did not plead guilty to the charge and was not formally found guilty. Magistrate Simon Zebrowski refused to release details of the charge but described it as "one momentary very slight touch" and "a single non-sexual episode that was extraordinarily minor in the circumstances". He ordered McGregor write a letter of gratitude to the police officer who recommended his case be diverted from court, a letter of apology to the complainant and make a $300 donation to the charity of his choice. If he complies by December, the case will be struck out.

== Filmography ==
Year	Title	Role	Notes
2008	Underbelly	Young Man	Episode: "Wise Monkeys"
2009	Carla Cametti PD	Barman	Episode: "To Have and to Hold"
2010–2011, 2013–2020	Neighbours	Mark Brennan	Main role; 940 episodes
2011	Winners & Losers	Brett	Episode: "Covert Aggression in Netball"
2012	Offspring	Theo	Episode: "Happiness is a Delusion"
2014	Brennan on the Run	Mark Brennan	Webseries
2015	Neighbours 30th: The Stars Reunite	Himself	Documentary

== See also ==
- List of male underwear models
