= Episode 7921 (Neighbours) =

- Neighbours episode
- Episode no.: Season 33; Episode 7921
- Directed by: Chris Adshead
- Written by: Libby Butler
- Original air date: 3 September 2018

Guest appearances
- Magda Szubanski as Jemima Davies-Smythe; Zoe Bertram as Fay Brennan; Sophia Davey as Annabel Rutherford

Episode chronology
← Previous; Episode 7920	Next → Episode 7922

Episode 7921 of the Australian television soap opera Neighbours was broadcast on Eleven and Channel 5 on 3 September 2018. The episode was directed by Chris Adshead and written by Libby Butler. The plot focuses on the wedding of popular couple Aaron Brennan (Matt Wilson) and David Tanaka (Takaya Honda). It is Australia's first televised fictional same-sex wedding since the country voted in favour of legalising same-sex marriage on 9 December 2017. The episode also sees the beginning of a relationship between David's brother Leo Tanaka (Tim Kano) and Terese Willis (Rebekah Elmaloglou).

Initial plans for the wedding began in 2016 when Honda joined the cast. He was informed that his character would have a relationship with Aaron, which would lead to their marriage. Producers and script writers planned for an engagement and wedding between the couple before same-sex marriage was legal in Australia. After same-sex marriage was legalised, the actors and viewers began calling for a same-sex wedding storyline. Both Honda and Wilson were keen for their characters to marry and they wanted Neighbours to be the first to show a legal same-sex marriage on Australian television. However, the serial's executive producer Jason Herbison wanted David and Aaron to face relationship challenges like the serial's other couples before marrying.

Confirmation of the wedding plot was announced on 30 May 2018, with production on the episode at the show's set in Nunawading already underway. The ceremony scenes were filmed in one day, with the reception scenes filmed during the following week. The day of the shoot was "pretty cold and miserable" and the bad weather meant that the cast and crew had to work as quick as possible. There was also a large media presence on set and Honda and Wilson would carry out interviews in between filming. Producers introduced comedian and actress Magda Szubanski as Jemima Davies-Smythe as the celebrant who marries David and Aaron. They contacted Szubanski's agent about the role after her prominent involvement in the campaign for marriage equality, and Szubanski accepted immediately. She improvised some lines during filming and continued to appear in the show after the episode aired.

To promote the episode, Neighbours released a trailer, featuring specially-filmed clips. They also released a promotional video and a countdown to the wedding on its official YouTube channel and website. Episode 7921 was well received by critics. Luke Dennehy of TV Week praised the writers and producers for marrying two of their most popular characters, and called the episode "an Australian television moment of history". A Mediaweek reporter called it an iconic episode of Neighbours, while News.com.au's Maria Bervanakis said it was "the biggest wedding since Scott and Charlene in 1987." Gary Nunn of The Guardian felt the episode would leave LGBTQI+ viewers feeling represented and called Szubanski's appearance "a stroke of genius". Bridget McManus of The Sydney Morning Herald also praised Szubanski's performance, saying it was clear she would steal the show. In November 2018, the wedding was nominated for the inaugural Screen Diversity and Inclusion Network Award.

== Plot ==
At Number 24 Ramsay Street, Aaron Brennan (Matt Wilson) is getting ready for his wedding to David Tanaka (Takaya Honda). He tells his family that the day will likely be a disaster, as they have no celebrant and his back is sore. At Lassiters Hotel, David is getting ready with his father Paul Robinson (Stefan Dennis) and his brother Leo Tanaka (Tim Kano) reads out a card from their mother. At Number 28, Karl (Alan Fletcher) and Susan Kennedy (Jackie Woodburne) return from Echuca, where Karl was hoping to find his half-sister. Susan finishes writing her celebrant's speech, unaware that Aaron and David believe she has pulled out. Aaron drops off the cake decoration at The Waterhole pub, where chef Gary Canning (Damien Richardson) tries to dodge a woman (Magda Szubanski) giving him cooking advice. Aaron turns down his sister Chloe's (April Rose Pengilly) offer to act as the celebrant, as he and David would have to marry at a registry office later on. They return home where the family take a picture, before getting into a waiting limo. However, Aaron slips and hurts his back, leaving him unable to walk properly. At the hotel, Leo tells manager Terese Willis (Rebekah Elmaloglou) there have been complaints about a group in one of the rooms, which she promises to deal with.

At the Pavilion, David is surprised to see Susan, but they soon work out that Aaron misunderstood a text message cancelling a meeting. David explains that they have a replacement – the woman from the pub. Aaron arrives in a wheelchair, but he manages to walk down the aisle. The celebrant starts off using Susan's speech, but soon ad-libs. Aaron and David recite their own vows and exchange rings, before the celebrant declares them to be married. As the guests leave to take photos, David checks Aaron is okay. Paul orders Leo to return to the hotel, as the guests from earlier have trashed their room and the police are involved. Susan complains to Karl about the celebrant, then accidentally breaks the front grill off the celebrant's car when she leans on it. Karl offers to pay for the damage and hands the celebrant his card. She recognises his name and reveals that she is his sister, Jemima Davies-Smythe. Leo gets to the hotel room just as the police are leaving. Terese makes a start on tidying up and Leo decides to help out. They both reach for a champagne bottle, which leads to them kissing. Terese then locks the door and they start taking off their clothes.

== Production ==
=== Conception and development ===
The episode features the wedding between Aaron Brennan (Wilson) and David Tanaka (Honda), making it the first same-sex wedding in the show and the first fictionalized legal same-sex wedding on Australian television. Planning for the wedding began when Honda joined the cast in 2016. He was informed in a script meeting that his character would have a relationship with Aaron, which would lead to their eventual marriage. Producers and script writers planned the engagement and wedding between the pair before marriage equality was legal in Australia. The following year, Australia voted in favour of legalising same-sex marriage and the Act came into effect on 9 December 2017. Coincidentally, Neighbours aired a failed proposal scene between the characters in January 2018, which had been filmed months before the referendum. A line in which David mentions the proposal is symbolic as they cannot legally marry was cut from the final script, following the outcome of the vote.

With the legalisation of same-sex marriage in Australia, Neighbours viewers and actors began calling for a same-sex wedding storyline. Honda stated "Whether that's a David and Aaron wedding, or whether it's somebody else. I'm really hoping Neighbours gets the opportunity. Neighbours have worked really hard to ensure they reflect the wider community so I think it's a really important step. Hopefully we get to do it soon!" Honda later told Johnathon Hughes of the Radio Times that as a result of the vote, a potential wedding between David and Aaron would be the first legal same-sex marriage on Australian television, an accolade he felt the show deserved due to the work that had been put into their storyline and other LGBT plots. The serial's executive producer Jason Herbison initially wanted David and Aaron to face relationship challenges like the serial's other couples before marrying.

On 18 May 2018, the show aired another proposal between the characters, which resulted in their engagement. Wilson commented that it was "a long time coming" and joked that the writers had finally run out of ideas to keep the characters apart. Wilson was really keen for Aaron and David to become the first couple to have a legal same-sex marriage, before fellow soap opera Home and Away or another Australian drama beat them to it. He believed that the episode would still be special, but being the first production to do it would be "even bigger." He admitted that he often went to the writing department to ask them to marry Aaron and David, saying "I think I started throwing that out about a year ago or even more. I feel like I've got a lot of ownership over this, so I want it to be perfect. I'm starting to feel like a bit of a groomzilla."

At the end of May, it was confirmed that David and Aaron would marry. Talking with Will Stroude of Attitude, Honda explained that for some people same-sex marriage needed to be legalised for the plot to air, as it could be "painful" to watch the wedding go ahead "without it being given the legitimacy of being legalised by society." Herbison described the episode as being "very meaningful" to everyone on the production team. Honda was keen to see viewer reaction to the episode, knowing that he and Wilson had put a lot of work into making their character's relationship "truthful", while Wilson was confident that fans would enjoy it. Honda also pointed out that the wedding is "proudly mixed-race" as David, like Honda, is of Japanese heritage. Honda said it was significant, but not something that had been brought up, whereas in the past it would have been "a huge deal".

Honda called the episode "a huge ball of positivity" and said there would be some dramatic moments before David and Aaron get to say their vows, but it would be beautiful. Two such moments occur just before the ceremony, as Aaron aggravates a back injury and has to use a wheelchair. Unable to walk down the aisle, he has to be supported by his siblings. The couple are also forced to find a new celebrant. Honda explained that the moment the couple are married has "a realistic seriousness of the occasion" and is "given the weight it requires and deserves." Following "an unusual ceremony", the pair are pronounced husband and husband. Wilson hoped the wedding would eventually lead to the couple having children.

The episode also sees the beginning of a relationship between Terese Willis (Elmaloglou) and David's brother Leo Tanaka (Kano). As they deal with a trashed hotel room, the "sexual tension between the couple is too explosive to ignore" and they have sex, making Leo late for the wedding reception. Elmaloglou commented that it was not premeditated, but "one thing just leads to another..." Elmaloglou admitted that she was surprised by the development, as it was the last thing she was expecting. She was worried about how she and Kano would look on-screen, as their body types are so different and she had to stand on a box for their kissing scenes. Kano was nervous about viewer reaction to the age gap between the pair and Leo's betrayal of Paul, who has feelings for Terese.

=== Szubanski's casting ===
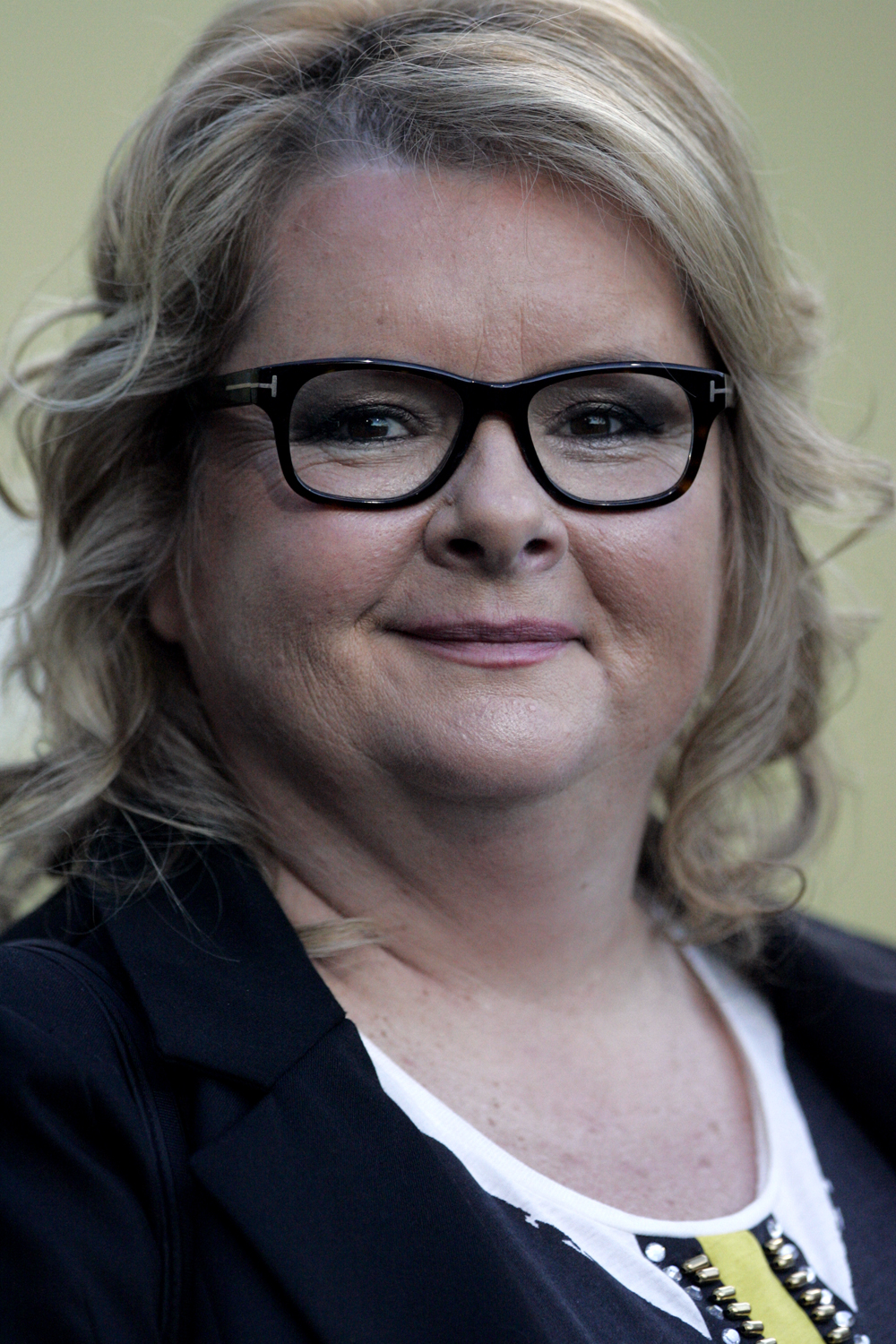
Actress and LGBTQ+ rights activist Magda Szubanski (pictured) was cast as celebrant Jemima Davies-Smythe.

Comedian and actress Magda Szubanski was cast in the role of Jemima Davies-Smythe, the celebrant who marries David and Aaron. Producers contacted Szubanski's agent about the role, after her prominent involvement in the "Yes" campaign for marriage equality. Szubanski accepted immediately, believing it to be "a fabulous, moving and hilarious idea." She added, "I thought it was just one of the best offers I've had for a long time. I thought it was both hilarious and historic so when they asked me I just jumped at it. I think it's gold." Szubanski recalled watching the wedding of Scott Robinson and Charlene Mitchell (Jason Donovan and Kylie Minogue) in 1987 when she was in her twenties. She told Bridget McManus of The Sydney Morning Herald that she and other gay people loved Neighbours, but they did not think there would ever be gay characters or a same-sex marriage. She said, "It didn't even occur to you that something like that would happen in your lifetime. If there had been, I would be completely different, honestly."

McManus wondered if Jemima's lines and jokes were written by Szubanski, as they seem "so quirkily Magda", but Szubanski said that while she did not write the script for Jemima, she did improvise some lines. Wilson also mentioned in his interview with Inside Soap that Szubanski helped "massage the scripts" with the writing department to make sure everything was perfect. Szubanski told McManus: "I thought the writers wrote some really funny stuff. Jason [Herbison], the producer, had some really funny ideas, but we also had to make sure that we honoured and acknowledged the moment. It was about getting the balance right. It is a joyous moment, so you want to have all of the feels – the laughing and the tears and the serious. I actually found it very moving when the boys were giving their vows. They were so sincere. Both Takaya and Matt were so respectful and got what it all meant."

Jemima is introduced shortly after some confusion results in the original celebrant Susan Kennedy (Jackie Woodburne) pulling out of the ceremony. Szubanski enjoyed playing Jemima, who she thought was the opposite of her well-known Kath & Kim character, Sharon Strzelecki. She called Jemima "a lot of fun" and "tricky", traits that she loved playing. Szubanski did not disclose if Jemima identified as LGBTQI+. Jemima's eccentric side is revealed as she carries out her celebrant duties, resulting in an unusual ceremony. Szubanski had considered becoming a marriage celebrant in real life and was even more interested in pursuing it after her appearance. McManus confirmed that Szubanski would continue to appear in the show after the wedding, and Network 10 stated that Jemima has a connection to "Ramsay Street royalty". It later emerges that she is the half-sister of established character Karl Kennedy (Alan Fletcher).

=== Filming and music ===
The episode was filmed in late May 2018 at the show's set in Nunawading. The wedding ceremony scenes were filmed in one day, with the reception scenes filmed during the following week. Herbison commented that filming took place on "a pretty cold and miserable Melbourne day", and Wilson said that the unpredictable weather meant that the cast and crew had to be as quick as possible. He also said "The set was outstanding, the extras looked incredible and everyone was in the best mood on the day. It strangely felt like a real wedding. You'll see the wedding guests' seating list in the back of some of the shots, the crew usually fill those out with their own names as a nod to all their hard work that goes into it. And it is well deserved." Honda found filming the episode to be both "special" and "crazy" due to the storyline and media presence on set. In between takes, he and Wilson would carry out interviews with the press, and Honda joked that it "put our multitasking abilities to the test." He also revealed that he was ill during the shoot.

Both Honda and Wilson admitted to feeling wedding jitters before they said their character's vows. Honda thought it helped their performance, as grooms are usually nervous on their wedding day. Wilson commented, "Once the suits were on and people started to arrive at this amazing set the art department had done such a good job on, I was nervous! There was a real buzz shooting the scenes. Takaya joked about inviting our girlfriends to be extras at the wedding but it seemed so real I would've felt weird having my partner watch me marry someone else!" Actress Colette Mann (who plays Sheila Canning) was on set during filming, and she praised the art, make-up and wardrobe departments for their work on the episode, saying they "worked their asses off!". Herbison also praised the show's art department for creating the setting. He said that the production crew "felt the emotion of the event" and many told him how meaningful the episode was to them.

The episode features music from Clare Bowditch and Gavin James. In the UK broadcast, the wedding ceremony features the song "Especially for You" by former Neighbours actors Jason Donovan and Kylie Minogue, as David and Aaron exchanged their vows.

== Promotion ==
On 10 August 2018, Neighbours released a trailer promoting the wedding. The trailer features specially-filmed clips and scenes from the episode. Josh Jackman of PinkNews called it "an uplifting, joyful clip, but we would forgive you for shedding a tear at that point." Days later, the show released another promotional video on its YouTube channel. Presented by Honda and Wilson, it features scenes from the wedding and reception, with commentary and personal insights into the filming and creation of the episode. The show's official website on TenPlay hosted a countdown to the wedding featuring articles, videos, photo galleries, and sneak peeks of the episode released daily in the lead up to the broadcast. "Episode 7921" aired in both Australia and the UK on 3 September 2018.

== Reception ==
The original broadcast of "Episode 7921" on Eleven was watched by 172,000 viewers in Australia. In the UK, the episode failed to make the top 15 most watched television shows on Channel 5 for that week, but it was the second highest rated episode of Neighbours across PC/laptop, tablet and smartphone users with 20,945 total views.

The episode received a positive response from television critics. The Sydney Morning Herald's Bridget McManus gave the episode three out of five stars. Praising Szubanski's casting and performance, McManus wrote: "From the moment that Szubanski's character, the confidant, strange, enigmatic Jemima Davies-Smythe, appears on screen, milling about the periphery of preparations for the nuptials of Erinsborough lovebirds, David Tanaka (Takaya Honda) and Aaron Brennan (Matt Wilson), it's clear she's going to steal the show." Siobhan Duck from the Herald Sun gave the episode four stars. She thought that Szubanski brought "some comic relief to the tear-jerking nuptials of Aaron and David" and that her appearance held a "special significance" due to her involvement in the Yes campaign.

Luke Dennehy of TV Week praised the writers and producers for "acting quickly" by marrying two of their most popular characters, as well as casting Szubanski as the celebrant. Dennehy thought the wedding should be "celebrated loudly", adding "it's an Australian television moment of history, and cheers to that." A reporter for Mediaweek called it "an emotionally charged, iconic episode of Neighbours". They noted that in typical Neighbours style, Aaron and David's day is marred by "last-minute disasters, injuries and family drama." Laura Morgan of Digital Spy included the episode in the website's "big soap moments" of the week feature. She also pointed out that "in true soap wedding style, things don't go without a hitch", and hoped that Aaron and David's marriage would "be less eventful!"

In a positive review for The Guardian, Gary Nunn stated "Three decades after Scott and Charlene tied the knot, the nuptials of David and Aaron send a powerful message about Australia's diversity." He felt the episode would leave LGBTQI+ viewers feeling represented, as well as sending "a very powerful message" to younger fans, who were able to watch a same-sex wedding during the daytime. Nunn branded it a "form of education about acceptance, respect and equal love." He liked that the plot was free from any controversy and the characters' relationship was not used to create drama or conflict. He called Szubanski's appearance "a stroke of genius" and concluded "the episode was also fun, avoiding the temptation to be self-congratulatory or saccharine by being genuinely funny."

Mamamia's Clare Stephens also reckoned that the wedding would continue to further LGBTQI representation, saying it was "a moment that shouldn't be underestimated." She observed that viewers were brought to tears by Szubanski's role as the celebrant, and wrote "Magda's power in her scenes, as well as during the campaign for marriage equality, was her ability to bring joy, happiness and laughter, while simultaneously acknowledging the significance of recognising same sex marriage in Australia." News.com.au's Maria Bervanakis called the event "the biggest wedding since Scott and Charlene in 1987. And it didn't disappoint." Bervanakis also noted there was an emotional reaction from viewers on social media, including those from the UK and US.

The episode was later reviewed during season 8 of Gogglebox Australia. In November 2018, the wedding received a nomination for the inaugural Screen Diversity and Inclusion Network Award. In March 2020, Tahlia Pritchard included the episode in her feature of "Iconic 'Neighbours' moments every Aussie knows by heart". Similarly, Jackie Epstein of the Herald Sun named the wedding as one the serial's 35 most memorable moments. In 2022, the wedding was included in a Radio Times poll to find "the best Neighbours moment in the show's history." The Hull Daily Mail's Ivana Finch named the wedding as one of the show's top five iconic moments. David Brown of Yahoo! Entertainment included the wedding in his feature on the ten most memorable Neighbours moments and called it "a landmark event".

Aine Toner of The Belfast Telegraph also named Episode 7921 as one of her ten most memorable episodes, writing "The first same-sex marriage on Australian television after its legalisation, never let it be said that Neighbours didn't move with the times. Surely as memorable as Scott and Charlene's, David Tanaka and Aaron Brennan walked down the aisle. There were a few ups and downs but nevertheless, it was branded one of the show's best ever episodes. Lovely touch that marriage equality campaigner Maga Szubanski played the couple's celebrant Jemima Davies-Smythe."
