= Simon Shinberg =

Australian fashion designer

Simon Shinberg (died 2012) was an Australian fashion designer known for popularizing the pantsuit at a time when women wearing pants was considered to be controversial.

== Career ==
In the 1940s, Shinberg founded the fashion house Sharene Creations in Melbourne which was a success. He later founded the fashion house Mr. Simon which was more affordable. and also licensed designs for international fashion houses. In 1957, he produced a line of costumes for British performer Sabrina. He was known for the diversity of his models, who included Aboriginal Australian and Asian women.

Shinberg designed a women's pantsuit after visiting Paris during the 1960s, which proved controversial. Beginning in 1964, he staged publicity events in which models wearing his pantsuits went to venues such as restaurants and nightclubs which denied entry to women wearing pants. The campaign proved successful, and played a role in the normalization of pants as an item of women's clothing in Australia. He retired in 1989.

== Personal life ==
Shinberg died in 2012.

== Legacy ==
In 2017, a posthumous showcase of his original designs made by his daughter Debra Dascal appeared the Melbourne Fashion Festival.
