= Elly Conway =

Fictional character in the Australian soap opera Neighbours

- Neighbours character
- Jodi Gordon as Elly Conway (2019)
- Portrayed by: Kendell Nunn (2001–2002); Jodi Gordon (2016–2023)
- Duration: 2001–2002, 2016–2020, 2022–2023
- First appearance: 13 December 2001
- Last appearance: 28 December 2023
- Introduced by: Stanley Walsh (2001); Jason Herbison (2016)
In-universe information
- Other names: Elly Brennan
- Occupation: Student; English teacher; Assistant principal
- Father: Ian Conway
- Mother: Liz Conway
- Half-sisters: Beatrix Nilsson
- Husband: Mark Brennan (2019)
- Wife: Chloe Brennan (2023–)
- Daughters: Aster Conway
- Aunts: Susan Kennedy; Carmel Tyler
- First cousins: Darcy Tyler; Malcolm Kennedy; Libby Kennedy; Billy Kennedy; Holly Hoyland (step)
- Other relatives: Ben Kirk; Jackson Kennedy; Susannah Kennedy

Eleanor "Elly" Conway (also Brennan) is a fictional character from the Australian soap opera Neighbours, played by Jodi Gordon. She was originally played by Kendell Nunn from her first appearance on 13 December 2001, until her departure in May 2002. Neighbours marked Nunn's first television role. The character was introduced as Susan Kennedy's (Jackie Woodburne) teenage niece, giving her instant connections within the show. Nunn said Elly had "a lot of attitude", while she was also billed as being rebellious and spirited. Elly did not like living in Ramsay Street, but she eventually befriends her neighbour Michelle Scully (Kate Keltie). A notable storyline for the character focused on her relationship with her estranged father Ian Conway (Peter Maver). When she gets in contact with Ian, he leads her to believe that Susan's husband Karl Kennedy (Alan Fletcher) is actually her real father.

The character was reintroduced on 18 July 2016, with Gordon taking over the role. She was initially contracted for three years and chose not to relocate to Melbourne, where the show is filmed, as her family is based in Sydney. Gordon explained that since Elly's last appearance, she had trained as an English teacher. Elly is now portrayed as a feisty, unpredictable "free spirit". Gordon also said she used her outgoing persona to hide her insecurities. The character's early storylines saw her clash with her student Piper Willis (Mavournee Hazel) and later Stephanie Scully (Carla Bonner) when she flirted with Steph's partner Mark Brennan (Scott McGregor). Later storylines saw Elly miscarry after being bitten by a venomous snake, and establish an on-off relationship with Ned Willis (Ben Hall). Elly's housemate Angus Beaumont-Hannay (Jai Waetford) develops an obsessive crush on her and takes advantage of her twice, which almost causes her to lose her job and home. Producers introduced Elly's former boyfriend Finn Kelly (Rob Mills) in March 2017, which led to further exploration of her background.

In January 2020, Gordon announced that she would be leaving Neighbours. She filmed her exit scenes in April and Elly made her final appearance on 10 July 2020. Gordon reprised her role for the show's finale episodes in 2022, and returned again in November 2023 upon the soap's revival. Her final appearance aired on 28 December 2023, following Elly's wedding to Chloe Brennan (April Rose Pengilly).

== Casting ==
On 22 November 2001, Kylie Miller of The Age reported that Kendell Nunn had joined the cast as Elly, along with Blair McDonough as Stuart Parker. Nunn successfully auditioned for the role a year after being discovered by a model scout in August 2000. Neighbours marked Nunn's first television role. She had to complete her last year of high school while working on the serial, which she said was "a bit of a struggle." The show's producer Peter Dodds told Wendy Granditer of Inside Soap that Elly would have instant ties to the show as she would be introduced as the "rebellious niece" of Susan Kennedy (Jackie Woodburne). Nunn made her first appearance as Elly during the episode broadcast on 13 December 2001.

== Development ==
=== Introduction and early storylines ===
Elly is introduced as the teenage daughter of Susan Kennedy's sister, Liz Conway (Christine Keogh). The show's producer Peter Dodds stated that Elly's arrival in Erinsborough would occur at the same as her cousin, Libby Kennedy (Kym Valentine), goes into labour in "typically trying circumstances." It later emerges that Elly has been expelled from her school after she was caught smoking cannabis. Of Elly, Nunn said "She's a great character – she has a lot of attitude and sometimes gets on the wrong side of people." Nunn explained that Elly initially dislikes Susan's husband Karl Kennedy (Alan Fletcher) because she has been without a father figure in her life. She also dislikes being in Ramsay Street. The official Neighbours website described the character as a "spirited teenager", as well as "smart, insightful and just a touch rebellious". During her time in Erinsborough, Elly befriends her cousin Darcy Tyler (Mark Raffety) and her neighbour Michelle Scully (Kate Keltie).

In one of her early storylines, Elly stays out late partying, angering Karl and Susan. Elly makes it clear that she does not intend to live by their rules. Nunn attributed this behaviour to a lack of discipline in Elly's life. She explained that her mother, Liz, let her do whatever she wanted, so she is not going to listen to Karl and Susan. The Kennedys know that Liz does not intend on returning to Australia to collect Elly, but she is unaware. Nunn stated "Elly thinks she's only staying for a short while – that either her mum will come back, or send her a ticket so she can join Liz in Europe. So she doesn't make much of an effort to get along with her aunt and uncle – she pushes them as far as she can." Elly's behaviour leads to Karl losing his temper and insisting that she abides by his rules or leave. Nunn said that Karl and Elly do not get along and they "rub each other up the wrong way" because of the lack of male figures in her life.

Towards the end of her stay with the Kennedys, Elly decided to meet with her estranged father. Karl tried to help and managed to get in touch with Ian Conway (Peter Maver), as he felt that Elly might settle down if she met with her father. However, Elly soon found out and contacted Ian herself to set up a meeting. When Ian arrived he insisted on having some time alone with Elly. Nunn told an Inside Soap columnist, "Once Karl and Susan have left the room, Ian tells Elly that he's not her dad but he knows who is. Then he comes out with it – her real dad is Karl!" Ian claims that Karl and her mother had an affair and Elly was born as a result. Elly was horrified by Ian's revelation, but the more she thought about it, the more it made sense. Nunn thought that since Elly and Karl did not get along, part of her did not want it to be true. But because she wanted a family, she hoped that she did belong to Karl. When Elly looked into Karl's background and found out he had previously had an affair, she started to believe that he was her father. However, it was later revealed that Ian really was Elly's biological father.

=== Reintroduction ===
If you watch Neighbours a lot and you are quick to judge, then what you will see is a not very likeable girl. She is flirting with the wrong people and finding herself in these situations that are very misleading, But if you tough it out, get to know her, give her a chance – you will see that there is a very special girl behind that."

— Anasta on whether viewers would like Elly (2016)

On 28 April 2016, Jonathon Moran of The Daily Telegraph reported that the character would be returning to the show with actress Jodi Anasta in the role. Anasta told Moran that she was "thrilled to be working" and said that her "biggest hurdle" was learning all of her scripts. She chose not to relocate to Melbourne, where the show is filmed, as her family is based in Sydney. She initially signed a three-year contract and made her first appearance as Elly on 18 July 2016. Anasta explained that in the character's fictional backstory, she has been living in Bondi and visiting her mother in Sweden. Elly has trained as a schoolteacher and has come to Erinsborough to teach alongside Susan. She thought Elly was different, as she had "gone through those young adult years where you test the boundaries."

Anasta described the older Elly as "fun, feisty", unpredictable and wild. She also called Elly "a free spirit" and thought she was "a bit of a tomboy". Anasta went on to say that while her character has many layers of naughtiness, she has "a heart of gold." Anasta thought Elly was a strong character, who often hides her insecure side with her "outgoing, positive personality". The actress told Daniel Falconer of FemaleFirst that Elly often goes out to party instead of focusing on her work. Anasta did not think she shared many of Elly's personality traits, such as her flirty and unpredictable side, but she thought that she did have some of Elly's strength. Anasta also compared Elly to her Home and Away character Martha MacKenzie, calling Elly "much more troublesome, and manipulative and vindictive than Martha; a lot more fiery and nasty." In the years away from Erinsborough, Elly has become an English teacher, like her aunt Susan. Anasta called Elly's teaching style unconventional, but thought she was "naturally gifted" at it. Anasta had trouble understanding how Elly manages to balance her job with her personal life, saying "I think it's because Elly is smart – she's a naturally good teacher – but she's also lazy and focuses on doing what she wants."

Elly returns to Erinsborough amid the high school formal and clashes with Piper Willis (Mavournee Hazel) over Tyler Brennan (Travis Burns). When Piper sees Elly talking to Tyler, Piper throws a drink over her, before learning Elly is her new English teacher. Of the incident, Anasta explained, "It's just some harmless flirting in Elly's eyes. From then on, their relationship is on a downward spiral. So I can tell you Elly won't be making friends with Piper!" Elly also got on the wrong side of Stephanie Scully (Carla Bonner) by flirting with her partner Mark Brennan (Scott McGregor). Anasta said Elly enjoys flirting with Mark, but had no intention of trying to take things further. She enjoys the company of all the Brennan brothers and develops a good friendship with them. Anasta also said that Elly would be accepted eventually, as people get to know her, and she would go on to make friends.

Elly moves in with Karl and Susan on Ramsay Street straight away. Anasta was pleased with the way Elly and Susan's relationship is portrayed, saying "Susan doesn't necessarily agree with the way Elly goes about things, but she doesn't judge her either." When asked by Sophie Dainty of Digital Spy what Elly and Susan's relationship was like, Anasta replied that they have a very mother/daughter relationship. Elly brings out Susan's "spicy side" and they have fun together, but Elly can also talk to Susan about her life. She also pointed out that there was an interesting contrast between Elly and Susan's teaching styles. Mark James Lowe of All About Soap observed that Elly appeared to be running away from something, and Anasta said Elly's past would be revealed in due course. She also told the show's official website that Elly had a broken heart and had some "personal issues to battle". The actress thought it would be "a big summer for Elly as she finds her place". She added that Elly would leave some fractured relationships in her wake, but she would also form some solid ones.

=== Snake bite and miscarriage ===
Anasta teased Elly's first storyline, saying it would happen quickly and be "quite a big tragedy". She also said that it would be linked to Elly's past and give the audience more insight into the character. A week after her return, Elly is bitten by a venomous tiger snake on Ramsay Street. Elly had spent the day having several "run-ins" with Steph and they later begin arguing in the street, where Elly notices Nell Rebecchi (Scarlett Anderson) is about to come into contact with the snake. She manages to pick Nell up and get her out of the way, but the snake bites her instead. Anasta was worried that no one would want to help Elly, as she had upset a few of the other characters since her arrival, but she thought that the event showed them that she is not all bad. She stated, "I think what this whole scenario has shown is that Elly does have a good heart. What she did for Nell was quite heroic I think, and shows another side of Elly; that she puts others before herself." Anasta told the show's official website that she enjoyed working with the real snake during the storyline.

As Elly is rushed to the local hospital, Karl is waiting to treat her and he knows that the snake's venom could be fatal. However, blood tests also showed that Elly is pregnant. Elly was unaware of her condition and she has very little time to process the news, before Karl tells her that the antidote she needs could harm the baby. Elly is "torn", as she does not want to risk the baby's health, but Karl tells her she has no choice but to take the antidote, and she allows him to administer it. Shortly after, Elly goes into anaphylactic shock and Karl has to administer some adrenaline too, which increases the pressure on her body, causing Elly to miscarry the baby. Susan offers her support to Elly and when she learns the truth behind Elly's problems, she begins to feel sorry for her.

=== Relationship with Ned Willis ===
When asked what storylines were ahead for Elly, Anasta mentioned that there would be "a bit of romance on the cards" with a character that was already familiar to viewers. In August, Elly was introduced to Ned Willis (Ben Hall) and they soon go on a date. Following that, Elly decides to play "hard to get" with Ned, but her aloofness causes him to ask Madison Robinson (Sarah Ellen) out on a date instead of her. This leads Elly to "throw her all into the challenge" of gaining Ned's attention once more. While looking through Ned's wallet, Elly finds a lock of blonde hair and immediately thinks it belongs to Lauren Turner (Kate Kendall), Ned's former crush and his father's partner. Hall explained that the romance with Elly starts out with lust and is "very unstable", before it begins to develop into something more long-term. He believed the relationship had potential to be long lasting, but admitted that Ned initially uses it as an opportunity to prove to everyone that he has moved on from Lauren. Hall described Ned and Elly's romance as a "passionate, fiery, 'up and down' sort of relationship", with the potential for drama.

Hall thought the couple were a good match, saying that it was a pairing that did not look like it would work, but that it just did. He also stated that as the characters were such passionate people, when they argued, it was their way of showing that they cared about one another. Ned later breaks up with Elly and warns her to stay away from him, as he will only put her in danger. Feeling rejected, Elly goes to The Waterhole for a drink and meets a stranger, who buys her a drink. When Ned sees them together, he realises the stranger is Jacka Hills (Brad McMurray), the husband of his former lover. Ned realises that Jacka is using Elly as part of his revenge plan and tries to fight him, before deciding to leave town. Ned and Elly are briefly reunited during Hall's third guest stint with the serial, but writers soon decided to end the relationship ahead of his departure. Elly tells Ned that she needs to be single and independent for a time, and Ned accepts her decision, having realised that they just have "bad timing."

=== Angus Beaumont-Hannay's crush ===
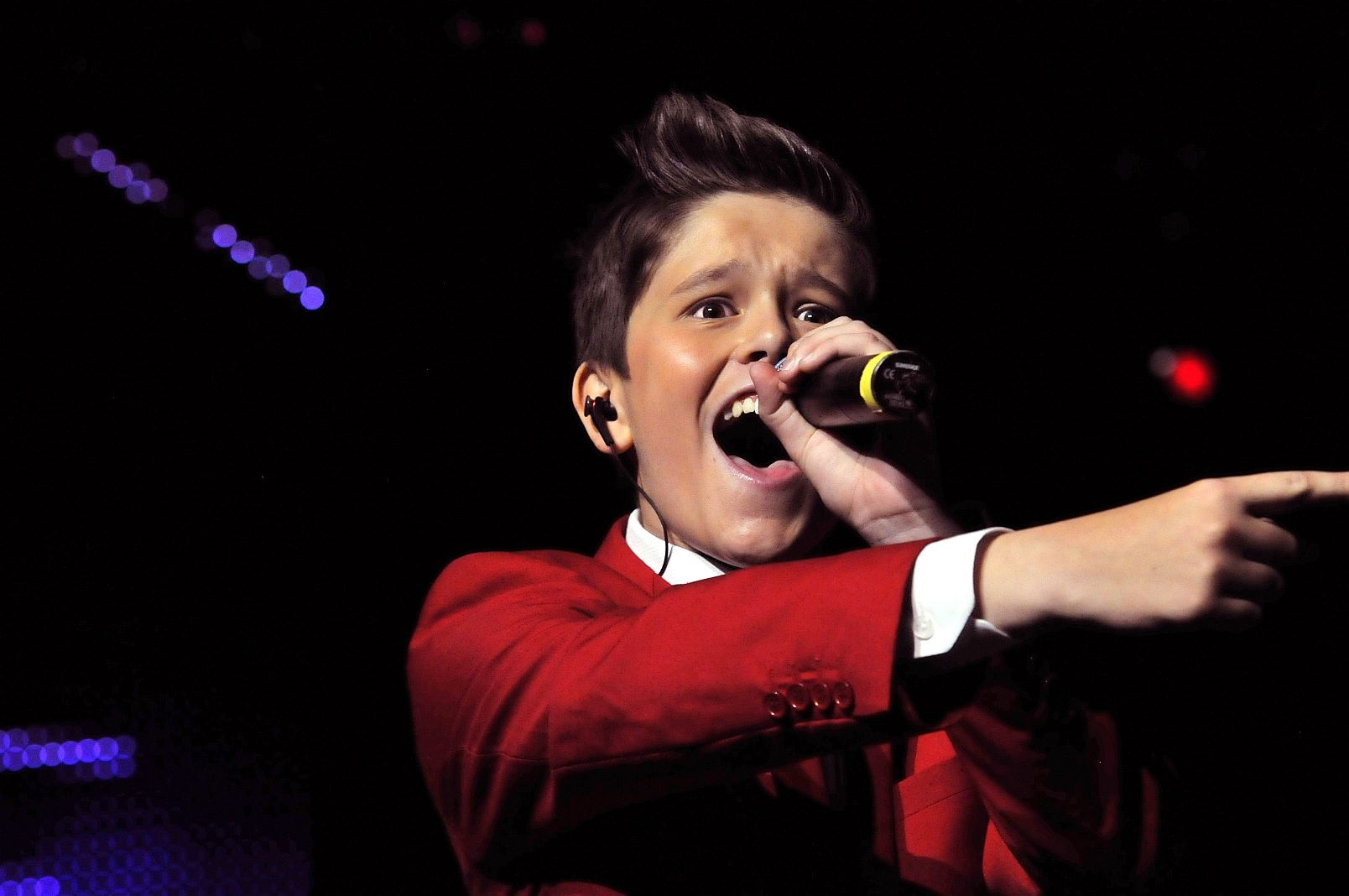
Singer Jai Waetford (pictured) plays Angus Beaumont-Hannay, who develops an obsessive crush on Elly.

When teen character Angus Beaumont-Hannay (Jai Waetford) was reintroduced in September, a new story arc saw him develop a crush on Elly. After he returns to stay at the Kennedy home, Angus "takes a clear interest" in Elly, but her cousin Ben Kirk (Felix Mallard) warns him off. However, Angus ignores Ben and manages to cause tension between Elly and Ned. Elly becomes aware that Angus has a crush on her, but she does not know how serious his feelings are. Anasta commented, "Elly is aware there is some sort of attraction, but definitely not how deep." At the school Halloween dance, Angus sings directly at Elly, leading her to realise that his crush is "bordering on obsession."

After growing uncomfortable with the attention, Elly returns home early and falls asleep on the couch, where she dreams about kissing Mark Brennan, who she has a crush on. Angus comes home and kisses her, leading Elly to kiss him back as she thinks it is Mark. Anasta said Elly "freaks out" when she realises it is Angus kissing her instead. Elly did not think Angus would ever act on his feelings and she feels "violated" by his actions. Susan becomes suspicious that something has happened between them, but Elly decides not to tell her about the kiss. Elly does tell her friend Leo Tanaka (Tim Kano), who confronts Angus and warns him away from Elly, leaving Angus "mortified".

Weeks later, Elly warns Angus to be careful after he befriends "a bad crowd" at his new school. Later that night, Elly receives a phone call from a drunken Angus, who she and Tyler Brennan rescue from a bar in the city. Angus believes that this means she has feelings for him too. Anasta explained that while Elly has been aware of Angus's crush on her, she has not led him on, saying "despite her sometimes questionable behaviour, Elly does have a moral compass – especially when it comes to things like this." Elly keeps the incident from Karl and Susan, as she does not want Angus to get into trouble. Anasta called the decision "Elly's biggest downfall", and she believed that if Elly told Susan what had happened, Susan would be able to help. Anasta also pointed out that Elly stood to lose her job and her home if Angus continued to put her in compromising situations.

Elly's former boyfriend Derek Meeps (Scott Tweedie) was later introduced. Angus becomes jealous and tries to stop Elly and Derek from meeting, but fails. Elly spends the afternoon with Derek, and she is "delighted" when it seems they are reuniting. However, after they have sex, Elly is left "deeply upset" by his sudden departure. Elly accepts Angus's support and he kisses her again in her bedroom. Susan catches Angus and she struggles to believe that he was just consoling Elly. Susan reports Elly to the education board and asks her to leave the house. The storyline concluded with Angus's departure from the show. Elly admits to Susan that Angus had taken advantage of her twice, leading the police to question Angus. Elly opts not to press charges against him, after he assures her that he knows his actions were wrong and he will not repeat them. Angus then leaves Erinsborough.

=== Feud with Finn Kelly ===
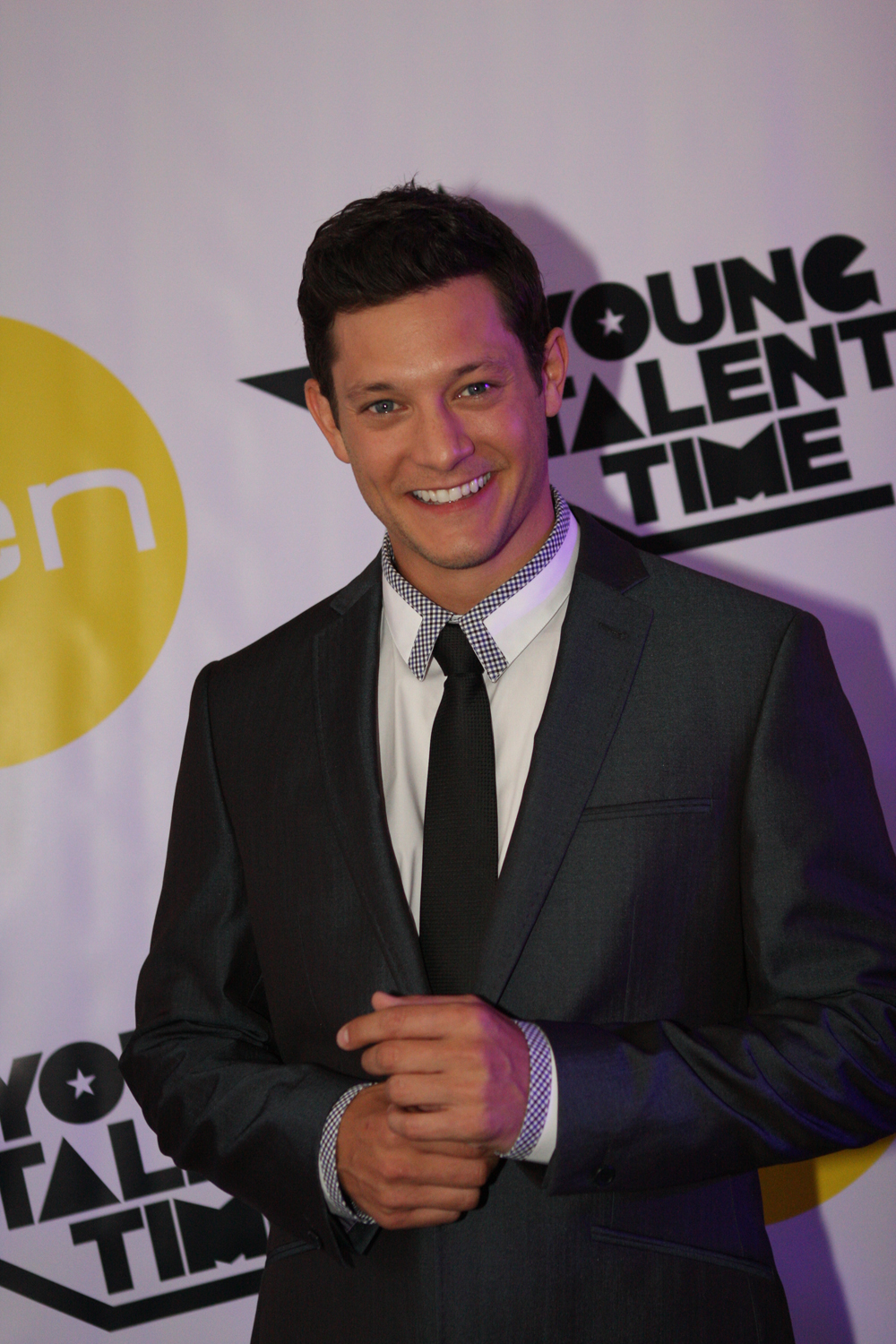
Elly's former partner Finn Kelly, played by Rob Mills (pictured), was introduced in March 2017.

Producers introduced Elly's former boyfriend Finn Kelly (Rob Mills) in March 2017. Ahead of his arrival, it is revealed on-screen that Elly had previously tried to run him down in her car. Anasta explained that following their break-up, Elly got in her car and drove straight at him. She continued, "I'd love to say we all have a moment like that – but that's not true! Most of us would hit the brakes. Elly just kept driving, though – so thank God he got out of the way." The actress also explained that Finn was married when he dated Elly, who was unaware he had a wife. Anasta described him as "the ultimate charmer and heartbreaker", and that because he broke Elly's heart, she is surprised to see him take a job at Erinsborough High. Finn's introduction helped to further explore Elly's background, with scenes showing where Elly came from, and all the manipulation and embarrassment she had endured and overcome because of him.

Elly tries to force Finn's resignation from the school, knowing that they cannot work together. When Susan advises her to stay professional, Elly realises that no one will believe her about Finn's "darker side". The pair later cause a scene at the Back Lane Bar when Elly refuses to forgive him. Following this, Finn takes over Xanthe Canning's (Lilly Van der Meer) tutoring from Elly and gets involved in Ben's career plans too. A message about the incident at the bar is posted online, which Elly suspects is Finn's doing. She fears that he is trying to isolate her, and during a confrontation, Elly pushes Finn away from her and he falls down some stairs in front of Xanthe. The former couple briefly reconcile when Finn "turns on the charm" and Elly is unable to resist him. However, Finn uses the relationship to undermine Susan's role as principal of Erinsborough High, and further his goal of taking over her job.

Of his character's relationship with Elly, Mills said "As far as winning Elly back, he can't tell her everything but still wishes she would trust him. He is a bit delusional, I think. He can't be honest, so she doesn't trust him, but he still feels like she should love him. I feel sorry for him in a way." Mills explained that Finn "genuinely" loves Elly, so he finds it hard when she does not reciprocate. He also thought that as Finn does not have trust, he cannot tell Elly about his brain aneurysm, which has "skewed his own sense of reality and morality as well, which is unfortunate because without it he's a good guy – just a slight sociopath." As Finn's storyline continues, he interferes with Susan's multiple sclerosis medication, resulting in her hospitalisation and his promotion to acting principal. He also manipulates Xanthe into keeping quiet, but when the swap is exposed, he tries to flee the country with Xanthe. Finn's brain aneurysm later ruptures, and at the hospital, he continues his downward spiral by claiming that Elly tried to smother him.

=== Departure and returns ===
Anasta signed a new one year contract with the show in May 2018. She felt that she knew what she was doing now and had become comfortable with the commuting between Melbourne and Sydney, where her daughter is based. She stated "I feel like Elly, my character, is in a great place. The storylines are getting bigger and better. There is a lot going on and it is an exciting time."

On 21 January 2020, Anasta confirmed that she would be leaving Neighbours later in the year, so she could return to Sydney to be with her daughter, and pursue other job opportunities. She also felt that her character had run her course, saying "She has done absolutely everything, I have had so much fun playing her. She is the most complex, crazy charismatic character in the world and I've gotten to a point with her where I just don't know where to go with her storyline." Anasta began filming her character's exit scenes during the following months. Of her departure, she commented, "Four years have just flown by, and for an actor, my character Elly has been an absolute gift. I am so grateful for my time on Neighbours and thrilled that I will be part of the 35th anniversary of the show." She added that Elly would have "a brilliant exit storyline", which she thought viewers would love.

In late March 2020, Neighbours began its planned Easter break one week early amid the Coronavirus pandemic, which changed the emotion of the character's exit storyline. Anasta later confirmed that she would return to Melbourne on 26 April for two weeks to finish filming Elly's exit. During a conversation with co-star Takaya Honda on his YouTube show Tak Talks, Anasta said that scenes had been rewritten to allow Elly to have the goodbye she deserves. The character's exit aired on 10 July 2020, as she moved to Switzerland for a fresh start.

On 7 May 2022, Dan Seddon from Digital Spy announced Anasta would reprise the role of Elly for the final episodes of Neighbours following its cancellation. She was one of numerous cast members who agreed to return for the show's end. The "most memorable characters" from each decade were chosen to return and Executive producer Jason Herbison explained that it ensured there was "something for everyone as Neighbours draws to a close." Elly's return aired on 22 July in the UK and 26 July 2022 in Australia, as she returns to Erinsborough to make Chloe "an unexpected offer". She is also reunited with Karl, Susan, and her cousin Malcolm Kennedy (Benjamin McNair). In May 2023, it was confirmed that Gordon would reprise the role again alongside Pengilly when the series returns.

== Storylines ==
=== 2001–2002 ===
Elly's mother, Liz Conway, comes to Erinsborough to ask her sister, Susan, to take care of Elly, as she is going to Sweden for six months. Elly arrives in Ramsay Street, accompanied by the police. She forms a bond with her cousin Darcy Tyler, but she struggles to get along with Susan's husband Karl. Susan faces a dilemma when she realises Elly thinks she is only staying for a couple of weeks, instead of six months. Darcy decides to tell her the truth, but Elly does not believe him and she is devastated when her friend, Michelle Scully confirms the news. Elly believes that she is getting a ticket to Stockholm, when her mother tells her to expect something in the post. However, she is disappointed when she receives a credit card. Elly then books herself on a flight to see her mother, but Susan manages to stop her from leaving. Elly forms a close relationship with Michelle, although they get off to a bad start when Michelle accuses Elly of cheating with her boyfriend, Zack Shaw (Owen Lee). Zack starts spreading rumours about Michelle and she teams up with Elly to get back at him. They write rumours about him on the blackboard, but they are soon caught. Elly stands up for Michelle, straining her relationship with Karl and Susan.

Elly informs Karl and Susan that she intends to move out when she turns sixteen. She changes her mind after listening to Lyn Scully (Janet Andrewartha) talk about family. Elly saves Darcy from the sudden effects of a heart problem, by giving him CPR. Elly is hailed a hero and she is given some work experience at the surgery. Elly briefly dates Tad Reeves (Jonathon Dutton). Karl and Susan decide to find out who Elly's father is, so they can give her some stability. Elly tracks down Ian Conway, who she believes is her father. Ian shocks Elly when he tells her that he had been informed Karl was her father. Elly asks Libby Kennedy if her father had ever had an affair and Libby admits that he did. Elly confronts Karl, but he tells her that he never had an affair with Liz. Elly is disappointed. Liz returns and reveals she is pregnant. She also admits that Ian is Elly's father, and that she had lied to him. Elly is devastated by her mother's neglect, especially when Liz forgets her birthday. When Liz asks Elly to come to Sweden with her, Elly is unsure, but decides to give her mother a second chance. She and Liz then leave for Sweden.

=== 2016–2023 ===
Fourteen years later, Elly returns to Erinsborough amid the high school formal. She flirts with Mark and Tyler Brennan. When Piper Willis sees Elly with Tyler, she becomes jealous and throws a drink over her. Piper is forced to apologise to Elly, who is revealed to be her new English teacher. Piper continues to be hostile towards Elly and later upsets her, causing Elly to almost hit Stephanie Scully and her son with her car. Mark is lenient towards her and Steph, who is dating Mark, becomes jealous of their friendship. Elly rescues Nell Rebecchi from a snake, but is bitten herself. Karl informs Elly that she is pregnant. However, she suffers an allergic reaction and miscarries the baby. Her former boyfriend offers no sympathy when Susan contacts him. Elly meets Ned Willis, Piper's half-brother, and they develop a relationship. Piper makes a formal complaint against Elly after she insults her. Susan finds that Elly has been marking Piper down, leading her to place Elly on probation. Elly undergoes counselling and she apologises to Piper.

Elly and Ned's relationship is strained when his former girlfriend Regan Davis (Sabeena Manalis) comes to him for help, and he takes her out of town to protect her from her husband Jacka Hills. Ned returns to see Jacka with Elly at The Waterhole, and they fight. Ned soon leaves town to get away from Jacka. Karl and Susan's teenage house guest Angus Beamont-Hannay develops a crush on Elly and kisses her while she is sleeping. Elly keeps the incident a secret, while telling Angus that nothing can happen between them. Elly's former boyfriend Derek Meeps visits and they have sex, leaving Elly to think they are getting back together, but Derek reveals he is engaged and expecting a baby. Elly gets drunk and Angus helps her to bed, where he kisses her again. Susan finds them together and reports Elly to the educational board. Elly tells Susan that Angus took advantage of her twice and he is questioned by the police. He apologises to Elly, before he leaves town.

Ned returns for his father's wedding and he and Elly reconcile. Ned is arrested for arson and Elly agrees to give him a character reference. Ned persuades her to stay in Erinsborough and Elly tells him that she deliberately drove her car at a man she was dating during a heated confrontation. Elly's former boyfriend, Finn Kelly, becomes a teacher at Erinsborough High. Elly asks him to leave, but briefly reconciles with him. When Susan's medication is switched causing her to be hospitalised, Elly blames Finn, but no one believes her. Elly enters Finn's motel room looking for evidence, and she is suspended when Finn is appointed acting principal. Finn's crimes are eventually exposed when he tries to leave the country with Elly's student Xanthe Canning. Elly admits that she has feelings for Mark, and they begin a relationship, which Elly ends when she learns her friend Paige Smith also has feelings for Mark. Elly and Paige's friendship is strained when Paige and Mark get back together. Following Paige's departure, Mark kisses Elly, but she refuses to be his rebound girlfriend.

Elly goes on a date with Amy Williams' (Zoe Cramond) former husband Liam Barnett (James Beck). Amy gives them her blessing to pursue a relationship, however, Elly decides to put her friendship with Amy first and ends things with Liam. Elly's younger sister Bea Nilsson (Bonnie Anderson) comes to Erinsborough and Elly attempts to reconnect with her. Elly encourages Bea to apply for a job at the local garage, and stands up for her when Mark accuses Bea of inputting the wrong figures on the invoices. When Mark tells Elly how he feels about her, she kisses him and then tells him that he has to earn her love, which he does. Elly becomes suspicious about Bea's boyfriend Patrick, after Bea reveals they are getting married. Later that day, Elly receives a text from Bea, asking her to come to the national park. Elly's car is stolen and used in a hit-and-run on Xanthe. Elly insists that she was not the driver, but she is arrested and charged. While trying to locate Bea, Elly and Susan find her car and come face to face with Finn, who reveals that he is Patrick and the perpetrator of the hit-and-run.

Finn locks them all in a shipping container and Bea blames Elly for ruining her life. Elly collapses due to dehydration just as they are found by Mark and Karl. Elly convinces Bea to move into Number 28, while Susan informs them that she has invited their mother Liz to Erinsborough. Both Elly and Bea confront Liz about Bea's departure when she was younger. Liz admits that she wanted Bea gone, as she reminded Liz too much of her father, Lars. Elly and Bea want Liz to leave, but let her stay when she claims that Finn robbed her. They soon learn that Liz made the story up, after she fell over while drunk, and Liz leaves. Elly and Bea grow closer and Elly offers her support when she realises that Bea is dyslexic. Elly bonds with Mark's sister Chloe Brennan (April Rose Pengilly), who confides in her about her relationship with businessman Pierce Greyson (Tim Robards). Elly, Susan, and Xanthe learn that Bea has gone to find Finn at a cabin in the bush and go after her. They run into Bea and then Finn, who taunts them on a cliff top. Finn is pushed over the cliff by Susan, after he threatens Bea's life.

Chloe calls Elly for help after she runs away from Pierce. Elly urges Chloe not to leave the country and tell her brothers about her relationship with Pierce. Chloe also tells her family that she has Huntington's disease, and Mark takes a test to see if he has it too. Jane Harris (Annie Jones) becomes acting principal at Erinsborough High and quickly comes into conflict with Elly. When Elly breaks the new rule about going off site, Jane fires her, claiming that she needs to lose a member of staff due to low enrolment levels. Chloe comforts Elly and kisses her. While waiting for Mark's test results at the hospital, Elly proposes to him and he accepts. During their engagement party, Chloe declares her love for Elly, but later tells her that she is always affectionate when she is drunk. Elly later reads a Christmas card from Chloe in which she admits that she is in love with her. She also learns Liz knew about the card and warned Chloe to back off. Elly, Chloe and a number of cafe customers are held hostage by Raymond Renshaw (Frank Magree). The incident brings Chloe and Elly together as they support one another. Elly encourages Chloe to talk with her former girlfriend Melissa Lohan (Jacqui Purvis), after she moves to Erinsborough. Mel soon learns about the kiss between Elly and Chloe, but promises to keep it from Mark. When Chloe and Mel reconcile, Elly expresses her concerns about Mel's intentions.

After their friend and neighbour Sonya Rebecchi (Eve Morey) reveals that she has ovarian cancer, Mark keeps his feelings to himself and shuts Elly out. She soon discovers that he is visiting the graveside of his former fiancée, and asks him to talk to her. After Sonya dies, Mark leaves town for a while and later calls off the wedding via text message. Chloe comforts Elly, who kisses her and they have sex. Mark soon returns home and apologises to Elly, before asking her to marry him. Elly and Mark marry, but she tells him that she cheated on him with Chloe during the reception. Chloe tells Elly that she loves her, but Elly rejects her, telling her that their night together was a mistake and that her heart belongs to Mark. Elly attempts to talk to Mark, but he refuses to listen to her and asks her for an annulment. Elly discovers she is pregnant and tells Mark. They reconcile, but Elly soon learns from the doctor that she had a false positive and is not pregnant. Leo advises her to keep quiet and try and get pregnant as soon as possible, however, Mark struggles to be intimate with Elly and rejects her advances. She goes out drinking and has a one-night stand with Shaun Watkins (Brad Moller), which results in her pregnancy. Mark later apologises for rejecting her and asks that they resume sleeping in the same bed.

Elly learns Shaun is Finn's brother at the sentencing hearing. Shaun realises he is the father of Elly's baby and uses it to blackmail her into changing her victim impact statement, and convincing the Kennedys to house Finn. Susan offers Elly her job back at the school, where she clashes with student Dean Mahoney (Harry Strand). With Leo's help, Elly manages to avoid having a twelve-week scan with Mark in attendance. He later catches her looking at his unborn daughter's ultrasound picture and assumes it is their baby, so Elly does not correct him. She later confides in Dr Dora Dietrich (Kirsty Hillhouse) about the paternity of her baby. Dean soon reveals that he is Dr Dietrich's son and has read Elly's file, leading him to blackmail her. Finn later works out that Shaun is the father of Elly's baby, but agrees to keep it a secret. Elly suffers a placental abruption after she is pushed over at school. Elly eventually tells Mark the truth about Shaun and the baby. She moves back to the Kennedys' and tells her family about the baby's paternity and why she asked them to house Finn. Shaun returns to town and asks to be a part of his baby's life. As he and Elly bond, Mark serves Elly with annulment papers, which she signs. When she learns that Mark has not filed the papers, she hopes they can reconcile. They share a kiss, and Shaun leaves town so they can have space, but Mark ultimately decides to end their marriage and files the papers. Elly and Chloe reconcile their friendship and Chloe stands up for Elly when a student taunts her about Dean. Elly and Chloe go on a date, where Elly admits that she feels overwhelmed, but Chloe assures her that she does not need to label herself and they end the date with a kiss.

Elly discovers that Bea is in a relationship with Finn and voices her disapproval, though she relents when she sees Finn help Bea with her dyslexia. When Chloe calls Elly her girlfriend, Elly reminds her that she needs them to take things slowly. Chloe breaks up with Elly and they agree to remain friends. However, Elly constantly texts Chloe to arrange outings, which leads to Pierce confronting Elly and telling her that it is causing Chloe pain. As Elly walks away, she slips and falls on her stomach, but the baby is okay. Elly takes her friends Aaron Brennan (Matt Wilson) and David Tanaka (Takaya Honda) to a birthing class, and continues to involve themselves in her pregnancy, which concerns Finn, who feels that Shaun is being left out. Elly goes to Sydney for a few days to spend time with her mother. She returns after Bea is hospitalised following an electric shock. Shaun supports her and asks her to start a romantic relationship with him, which she rejects. David later finds Shaun has some legal documents regarding custody arrangements, and when Elly confronts him, he tells her that his mother had them drawn up and they burn them. As Shaun helps Elly clear up the school after the formal, they share a romantic moment and later kiss. Mark leaves Elly a goodbye message as he plans to leave Erinsborough, but Elly seeks him out at the lake to talk and they say their goodbyes in person.

Shaun returns to Switzerland and goes missing in an avalanche. He is presumed dead and Elly and Finn rely on each other for support. Bea helps them by holding a memorial for Shaun by the lake. When Finn violates his parole to bring Elly some pain medication at the school, he scares a student who later goes missing. Elly takes the blame and is fired. Finn offers her financial support and they grow closer. Finn finds and holds onto an old photo album of Elly's from when they were a couple. Susan notices the growing bond between Finn and Elly, as does Finn's mother Claudia Watkins (Kate Raison), who tells Bea. Elly and Finn reassure her that nothing is going on between them. However, their feelings for each other grow stronger after Finn helps Elly give birth to her daughter Aster Conway (Isla Goulas; Scout Bowman), while she is being held hostage by Robert Robinson (Adam Hunter). Susan catches the two having a romantic moment in their backyard and confronts them. Knowing she can not hurt Bea, Elly begs Susan not to tell her and decides to move into Number 32. But she is forced to call Finn over when she struggles to settle Aster. Bea contacts Finn's father Trent Kelly (Peter Houghton), much to the Finn's chagrin. Elly comforts Finn when he discovers that his father intended to pay the ransom to rescue him when he was held hostage in Colombia, but ended up gambling the money. Elly and Finn kiss after Aster's naming ceremony, and Finn later tells her that he loves her.

Finn, Elly, Bea, Toadfish Rebecchi (Ryan Moloney), Chloe, Pierce, Kyle Canning (Chris Milligan) and Roxy Willis (Zima Anderson) head to Pierce's island for Elly's 35th birthday. Finn tells Elly that he and Bea have broken up and she has gone to Sydney, but Elly becomes suspicious when her mother tells her Bea has not turned up at her home and Chloe informs her that she and Finn had a confrontation. Finn offers to accompany Elly to Sydney, but when she finds Bea and Toadie's phones in Finn's backpack, she realises he has been deceiving her. She flees with Aster, with Finn chasing after her. Elly finds Gary Canning's (Damien Richardson) body and realises Finn has killed him. Finn eventually corners her, kidnaps Aster, and pushes Elly into a mineshaft where Bea and Harlow Robinson (Jemma Donovan) are. He then sets the island on fire before leaving. Elly, Bea, Harlow are rescued when Paul Robinson (Stefan Dennis) finds an injured Toadie, and tells the others on the island of Bea's whereabouts. Upon reaching the mainland, Elly goes to find Finn, Susan and Aster in the Snowy Mountains. After rescuing them, she tells Susan that she is going to make sure Finn cannot hurt them anymore. She finds Finn has drowned in a makeshift grave he was digging for Susan. As the police arrive, she is seen attempting to bury Finn's body and is later charged with his murder. The charges are downgraded to voluntary manslaughter in a plea deal to avoid a custodial sentence, but Finn's mother Claudia blackmails the judge into giving her a three-year sentence, so she can gain custody of Aster.

Elly befriends Andrea Somers (Madeleine West) in prison when Andrea helps save her and Aster during a riot. However, she soon realises that Andrea is scheming to get her son back and warns Toadie and Andrea's sister Dee Bliss (Madeleine West). Andrea has her beaten up and later arranges a fight between her and another inmate. Elly is saved when she is called to the governor's office and told that she is being released, after Claudia's blackmail is found out. Elly is reunited with Aster and Shaun, who was recently rescued. Elly is initially reluctant to leave the house following her ordeal in prison, but Shaun encourages her attend Aster's vaccinations at the hospital. Shaun struggles to understand Finn's actions and decides to return to Switzerland to seek help. He returns a few weeks later and helps Elly when she is hassled by a journalist. He also supports her when she is rejected by a mother's group because of her history with Finn. Elly and Shaun have sex and begin a relationship. He later asks her to move to Switzerland with him. Elly's sentence for voluntary manslaughter is reduced to time served, and she is no longer allowed to teach. Toadie offers to get her and Aster some visas if they decide to leave the country, and Shaun tells her that he is considering taking over the family business. Elly agrees to move with Switzerland with him, but puts off telling Bea, leading to a confrontation when she does find out. Bea asks Elly to stay, as she needs her, but Elly says that she needs a fresh start. Karl and Susan return home from their holiday early to say their goodbyes. Bea decides not to accompany Elly to the airport and they say goodbye at the house, before Karl and Susan drive Elly, Aster and Shaun out of Ramsay Street.

Two years later, Chloe visits Elly in Sydney, where she and Shaun have moved to after breaking up. Elly follows Chloe back to Erinsborough and tells her that she wants to be with her. Elly admits that she is queer and knows who she is now. She tells Chloe to take her time and call her when she is ready to talk further. Elly then joins Karl and Susan for brunch with her cousin Malcolm and his girlfriend Izzy Hoyland (Natalie Bassingthwaite). She later returns to see Chloe, who says that out of all her relationships, Elly has meant the most to her, but she is unsure if it is real. Elly tells Chloe what their life could look like together in Sydney, but Chloe is still hesitant and pulls away from their kiss as she needs time to think. Elly catches up with David and she meets Chloe's former girlfriend Nicolette Stone (Charlotte Chimes). David points out that it took Elly a long time to come to terms with her sexuality, and that Chloe needs more than a day to figure out what she wants. Elly visits Chloe to tell her that she is leaving for Sydney, after realising that she needs to back off and give her some proper time to think things through. Elly adds that she will wait as long as it takes. Elly returns along with Bea to attend Toadie's wedding. Chloe kisses Elly, cementing their reconciliation as a couple. Chloe moves to Sydney to be with Elly and Aster.

A couple of years later, Chloe returns to Erinsborough to temporarily help run Lassiters. She invites Elly to join her, who soon notices her odd behaviour. Chloe admits that she has started presenting with Huntington's symptoms, and offers Elly a way out of their relationship, so she does not have to watch her condition deteriorate. Elly seeks advice from Susan and Nicolette, before assuring Chloe that she means a lot to her and Aster. She then proposes, which Chloe accepts. In the midst of planning their wedding, Elly learns that Liz has been leaving Aster home alone while she is meant to be babysitting. Elly tells Liz not to come to the wedding. Susan offers to take care of Aster while Elly and Chloe go on their honeymoon. The couple marry at the pavilion in front of their family and friends, before leaving for their honeymoon that same day.

== Reception ==
Ahead of her introduction, Kylie Miller of The Age branded Elly a "likeable delinquent", while Cameron Adams from the Herald Sun called her "a precocious teenage upstart". Michael Idato of The Sydney Morning Herald criticised Nunn's acting ability and her debut performance on Neighbours, writing that he was "rendered speechless" by her poor performance. Idato went on to say that her arrival was "so thoroughly underwhelming and her delivery so off the mark" that no one noticed McDonough's introduction during the same episode. He also dubbed Elly a "hybrid of the brazen-hussy-troublemaker and dumped-by-a-disinterested-mum character types that seem to reproduce like rabbits on soaps." Observing Elly's behaviour, a Liverpool Echo reporter commented, "Stand well back – Elly is about to fly off the handle." Roz Laws, writing for the Sunday Mercury, dubbed Elly a "troublesome teen". A writer for the BBC said Elly's most notable moment from her first stint was "Asking Karl if he was her real father."

While reviewing the character's reintroduction, a critic for The Advertiser stated "Elly is classic Neighbours vixen and she's making her presence felt far and wide, especially with the Brennan brothers." Clare Rigden of the Herald Sun enjoyed Anasta's first episode, writing "This episode has it all – a school formal, some truly questionable frock choices, and the first appearance of everyone's favourite WAG, Ms Jodi Anasta, who arrives in town as Erinsborough High's newest English teacher – and promptly makes moves on one of her student's boyfriends. Keep it classy, Miss!" When Elly was bitten by the snake, Phillip Portman of the Daily Star quipped "Only on Neighbours can someone arrive in Ramsay Street and a week later, be fighting for their life." Portman also dubbed the character "promiscuous". A TV Week contributor observed, "It hasn't been the smoothest introduction to Ramsay Street for newcomer Elly." Another critic for The Advertiser noted how "fans are loving Jodi Anasta's transformation from Summer Bay's golden girl to Ramsay St's vixen." Kate MacCarthy of the Radio Times wondered if Elly and Ned were "set to be the cutest new couple in Ramsay Street?" While Sarah Ellis of Inside Soap observed "it's clear from the get-go that this is going to be an interesting relationship given that both Ned and Elly are a little on the mischievous side!" A reporter for the Liverpool Echo noted that the school Halloween dance was "aptly horrific for Elly" when Angus sang to her.

When the character departed in 2020, Joe Julians of the Radio Times wrote "Having returned to Neighbours in 2016, things haven't been simple for Elly Conway (Jodi Anasta) as the character has bounced from one dramatic story to the next." While pointing out that Elly was no longer allowed to teach, Julians quipped "if we're totally honest, we aren't sure she was suited to the job anyway." He compiled a list of seven of the character's "best moments", which includes Elly being bitten by a snake upon her arrival, allowing Angus to get too close, "everything with Finn Kelly", her relationships with Mark and then Chloe, giving birth while being held hostage, and her brief time in prison.
