= April Rose Pengilly =

Australian actress and model (born 1988)

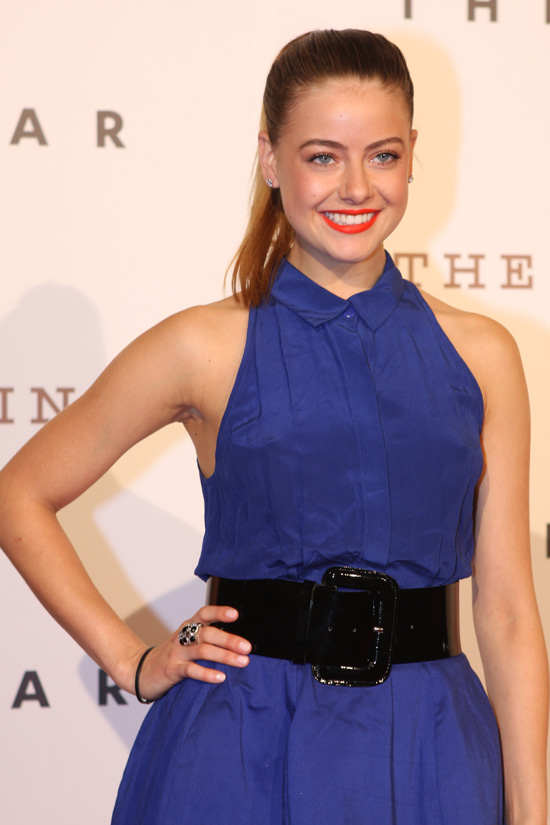
- April Rose Pengilly in 2011
- Born: April Rose Pengilly; 12 April 1988 (age 38); Sydney, New South Wales, Australia
- Education: Wenona School, National Institute of Dramatic Art
- Occupations: Actress, model
- Years active: 2004–present
- Height: 5 ft 8 in (1.73 m)
- Spouse: Adam Paul Jones (m. 2025)

April Rose Pengilly (pen-GILL-ee; born 12 April 1988), also known as April Rose, is an Australian actress and model.

== Early life ==
April Rose Pengilly is the daughter of INXS member Kirk Pengilly and designer Karen Hutchinson. She attended Wenona School and began modelling during Year 12. She has used the stage name April Rose to separate herself from her father. She is also the step daughter of world champion surfer Layne Beachley.

== Career ==
=== Modelling ===
Pengilly signed to Sydney's Chadwick Models at age 16, then to New York's Wilhelmina Models after graduating from high school and became a youth ambassador for the 2006 David Jones Summer collection, along with Megan Gale.

Pengilly has walked for leading designers at Australian Fashion Week, lived and worked in New York, London, Tokyo and Osaka, and fronted major campaigns. She has worked with top photographers Rankin, Pierre Toussaint, and Terry Richardson. She has featured on magazine covers and in editorials for InStyle, Elle (UK), The Times (UK), Harper's Bazaar, Marie Claire, Oyster, Seventeen (US), and Glitter (Japan).

Pengilly has been selected for many elite roles, including ambassador for leading Australian department store David Jones, face of the Melbourne Fashion Festival, face of the Nokia L’amour cell phone collection, ambassador for Sony, ambassador for Barbie and the "legs" of Japanese stocking label ATSUGI.

In 2009, Pengilly was named Ambassador for the Melbourne Fashion Festival, working alongside J. Alexander and Doutzen Kroes. She has worked as a TV presenter for Fashion TV at London Fashion Week. She signed on as an ambassador for the charity Dementia Australia, adding to her previous involvements with charities including The Eye Foundation, SunSCHine/Sydney Children’s Hospital and the RSPCA.

Pengilly began a fashion and lifestyle blog in 2011. She was nominated for PETA's annual Sexiest Vegetarian Celebrity Awards in 2014.

=== Acting ===
Pengilly began studying acting in her spare time, and attended classes at National Institute of Dramatic Art (NIDA) and Actors Centre Australia. She was cast in the independent feature film LBF in 2011. The film is based on the Australian novel Living Between Fucks by Cry Bloxsome and stars Australian actors Toby Schmitz, Gracie Otto, Septimus Caton and Bianca Chiminello. The film, directed by Alex Munt, premiered internationally at South by Southwest festival.

Pengilly starred in the independent short film Object in 2013, which screened at the Cannes Film Festival. The following year, she competed on the season 14 of Dancing with the Stars. She was partnered with Russian dancer Aric Yegudkin and danced for Dementia Australia. Pengilly and Yegudkin were eliminated in week three despite a score of 29 out of 40. Viewers thought Pengilly and Yegudkin's elimination was unfair, as fellow contestant Mark Holden had received a lower score and broken rules. Holden later offered to swap places with Pengilly.

Pengilly has worked as a television host, covering London Fashion Week for FashionTV. In 2015, Pengilly had a guest role in the Channel 7 miniseries Peter Allen: Not the Boy Next Door. The following year, she had a guest role in Brock. She also appeared in the short films Jinxed, Duffy, and Lovelost.

Pengilly admitted she struggled to be taken seriously as an actress in Australia following her modelling career. She was ready to move to the United States when she joined the cast of soap opera Neighbours as Chloe Brennan in late 2017. She made her first appearance on 27 March 2018. For her portrayal of Chloe, Pengilly won the Best Daytime Star accolade at the 2021 Inside Soap Awards. Pengilly departed Neighbours following its cancellation in 2022, but returned for a guest stint when it was revived by Amazon Freevee in 2023.

After leaving Neighbours, Pengilly voiced the role of Amy Haqq in the six-part audio series Gripped: Second Son, which also stars Lincoln Younes and Zoe Carides. She also appears in the online comedy series Full Story created by and starring Australian comedian Troy Kinne. Pengilly makes a cameo appearance alongside her former Neighbours co-star Tim Robards in James Demitri's Australian horror film Drax. She has also joined the cast of Australian survival-thriller film Bully.

== Personal life ==
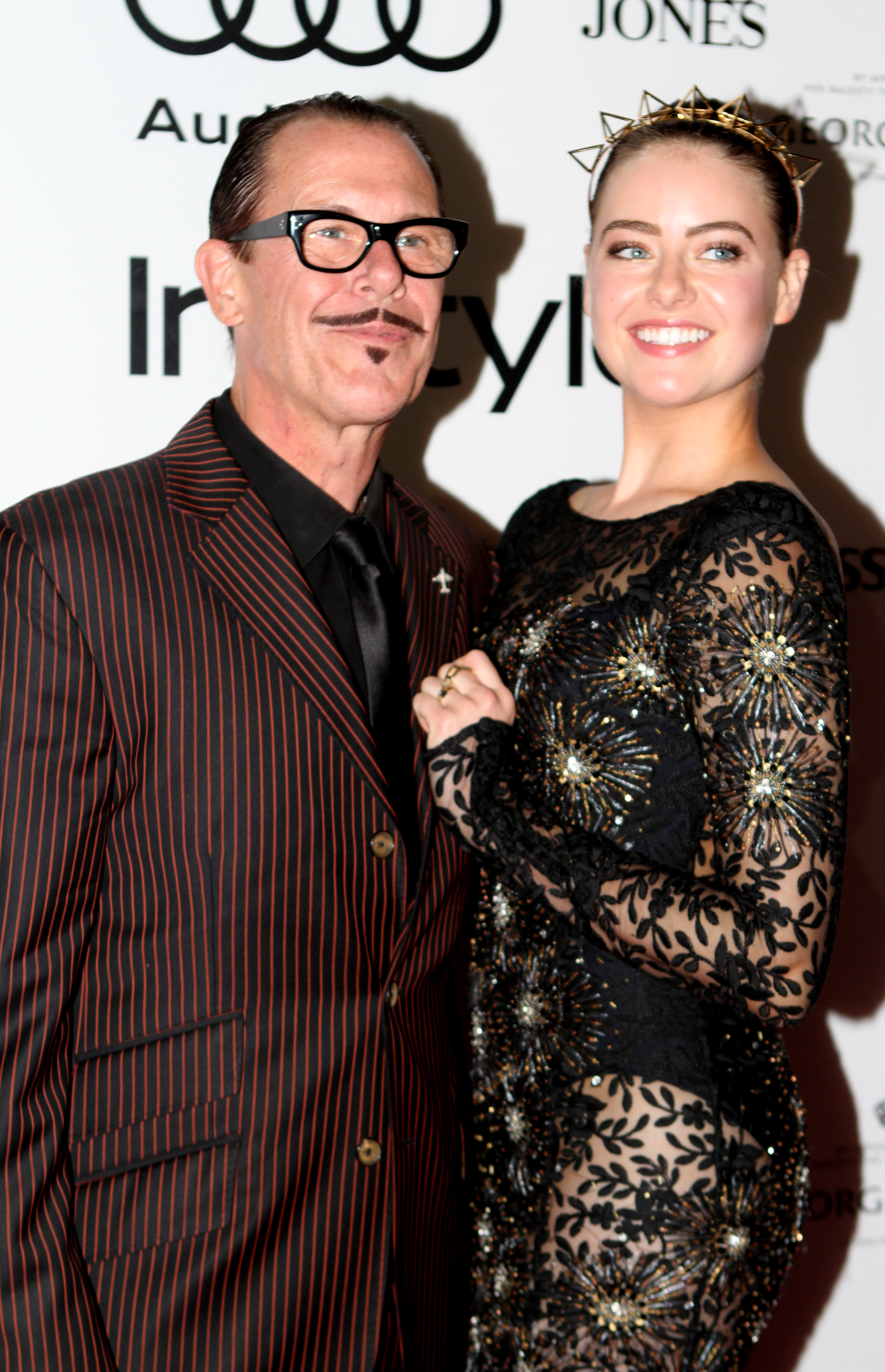
April Rose Pengilly and father Kirk Pengilly in 2015.

When she appeared on Neighbours, Pengilly split her time between her home in Sydney and Melbourne, where the show's studios are located.

Pengilly was in a relationship with drummer Tim Commandeur for three years, before they broke up in 2014. She later dated musician Alex Laska of Melbourne rock band Kingswood.

On 9 December 2023, Pengilly announced her engagement to architect Adam Paul Jones, with whom she has been in a relationship since early 2022. They were married at the Château de Challain-la-Potherie in France on 26 August 2025.

== Filmography ==
Year	Title	Role	Notes
2011	LBF	Tanya	
2013	Object	Model	Short film
2014	Dancing with the Stars	Herself	
2015	Peter Allen: Not the Boy Next Door	Tracey	
2016	Jinxed	Jane	Short film
2016	Duffy	Lydia	Short film
2016	Brock	Hippy Girl	
2018	Lovelost	Sophie	Short film
2018–2023	Neighbours	Chloe Brennan	Series regular (2018–2022); guest (2023)
2025	Full Story	Caroline	Webseries
2026	Drax	Dana	
