= Change of Heart (EP) =

- 2012 release

EP by Kingswood
- Released: May 2012
- Label: Kingswood

Kingswood albums chronology
Quiesce (2012)	Change of Heart (2012)	Microscopic Wars (2014)

Change of Heart is the third extended play by Australian alternative rock group Kingswood. The EP was released in May 2012. A deluxe version was released in April 2013.

The EP contains theis debut single "Yeah Go Die" released in 2011. and second single "Medusa" released in June 2012.

Following its release the group completed over 100 gigs in 2013, including festival slots and opening for Aerosmiths Steve Tyler and in December 2013, the group signed with Dew Process.

At the AIR Awards of 2013, the EP was nominated for Best Independent Hard Rock or Punk Album.

== Reception ==
Simon Topper from Beat Magazine said "the songs are split evenly into those that absolutely work, and those that would benefit from a little spontaneity" calling out "Medusa" and "Ohio" as highlights.

== Track listing ==
Change of Heart
No.	Title	Length
1.	"Change of Heart"	2:49
2.	"Medusa"	3:39
3.	"Yeah Go Die"	3:32
4.	"Sun"	3:40
5.	"Yeah Go Die" (acoustic)	3:32

Change of Heart (Deluxe)
No.	Title	Length
1.	"She's My Baby"	2:49
2.	"Medusa"	3:39
3.	"Ohio"	3:44
4.	"Sun"	3:40
5.	"Change of Heart" (stoner mix)	4:00
6.	"Yeah Go Die"	3:32
7.	"Wolf"	5:01
8.	"¡Si, Anda y Muerete!"	4:03

== Release history ==
Release history for After Hours, Close to Dawn
Region	Date	Format	Label	Catalogue
Australia	May 2012	CD; digital download; streaming	Kingswood	KWDCD006
Australia	April 2013	CD (Ltd edition re-issue); digital download; streaming	Kingswood	KWDCD008
