= Midnight Mavericks =

Studio album by Kingswood
- Released: 22 May 2026
- Genre: Country rock
- Length: 36:53
- Labels: Kingswood; ABC
- Producer: Alexander Laska

Kingswood chronology
The Tale of G.C. Townes (2023)	Midnight Mavericks (2026)

Midnight Mavericks is the eighth studio album by the Australian alternative rock group Kingswood, released on 22 May 2026. The album debuted at number 23 on the ARIA Charts, becoming the group's fifth top 50 album.

Writing for Country Town, Megan Hopkins said "Written in the spaces between touring, long drives and late night self reflection, Midnight Mavericks explores themes of ambition, belonging, loyalty and escape with the kind of perspective that comes from living it, rather than chasing a polished product."

At the 2027 Country Music Awards of Australia, the album was nominated for Alt. Country/ Americana Album of the Year and Album of the Year.

== Reception ==
Justine McNamara from The AU Review gave the album 4 1/2 out of 5 saying "Kingswood create a country-rock album that showcases their experience on the road and provides an insight into their Americana influences. The production delivered by Laska on this album is excellent, every instrument sings alongside his and Linacre's vocals. These songs take you on late-night drives, nights out at small country bars, and long, long road-trips with no end in sight."

James Daykin from Entertainment-Focus said "Across Midnight Mavericks, Kingswood continue to evolve, leaning further into American heartland, folk and country influences while still retaining their indie rock DNA. The result is a rich, varied record that moves effortlessly between jangly 90s Americana, darker western tones and classic melodic rock."

== Track listing ==
Midnight Mavericks track listing
No.	Title	Writer(s)	Length
1.	"Two Lovers" (featuring Steph Greenwood)	Alexander Laska; Fergus Linacre	2:40
2.	"Lovin' a Girl"	Laska; Linacre	3:22
3.	"The Action"	Laska; Linacre	4:27
4.	"Highway Signs"	Laska	3:18
5.	"Mary Jane"	Laska	3:33
6.	"Jenny"	Laska; Linacre	5:15
7.	"Faith"	Laska; Jon Decious; Tyler Halverson	2:49
8.	"Pouring Rain"	Laska; Linacre	3:39
9.	"Joanie"	Laska	3:52
10.	"Last First Kiss"	Laska; Linacre	3:53
Total length:			36:53

== Personnel ==
Credits are adapted from Tidal.

=== Kingswood ===
- Alexander Laska – production, engineering, mixing, mastering (all tracks); electric guitar (tracks 1, 3, 5–8, 10), lead vocals (2, 4, 9)
- Fergus Linacre – lead vocals (1, 5–10), background vocals (2, 4)

=== Additional contributors ===
- Ben Cremer – drums (1, 3–10)
- Shane Reilly – guitar (1, 3–10)
- Stephany Greenwood – lead vocals (1, 3), background vocals (2, 4–10)
- Paddy Montgomery – mandolin (4)

== Charts ==
Chart performance for Midnight Mavericks
Chart (2026)	Peak position
Australian Albums (ARIA)	23

== Release history ==
Release history for Home
Region	Date	Format	Label	Catalogue
Australia	22 May 2026	CD; LP; digital download; streaming	Kingswood, ABC Music	ABCKWA26
