= After Hours, Close to Dawn =

Studio album by Kingswood
- Released: 3 March 2017
- Recorded: Sound Emporium
- Length: 35:06
- Label: Dew Process

Kingswood chronology
Microscopic Wars (2014)	After Hours, Close to Dawn (2017)	Juveniles (2020)

After Hours, Close to Dawn is the second studio album by Australian alternative rock group Kingswood. The album was announced in December 2016 and released on 3 March 2017. The album peaked at number 10 on the ARIA Charts.

== Reception ==
Tex Miller from Forte Magazine gave the album 4 out of 5 and described the album as "a big evolution in their sound" closing with "this album one of my favourites of 2017."

Rod Whitfield from The Music gave the album 3.5 out of 5 spoke of how different it was from their debut album "the beauty of it all is that the vast majority of it works a treat."

== Track listing ==
After Hours, Close to Dawn track listing
No.	Title	Writer(s)	Length
1.	"Looking for Love"		3:04
2.	"Creepin'"		3:46
3.	"Golden"	Alex Laska	3:23
4.	"Library Books"		3:27
5.	"Belle"		3:11
6.	"Big City"		3:48
7.	"Like Your Mother"		2:23
8.	"Rebel Babe"		3:58
9.	"Alabama White"		2:56
10.	"Atomsphere"		3:54
11.	"Why Do I Get Stuck When You Arrive ?"		1:17
Total length:			35:06

== Charts ==
Chart performance for After Hours, Close to Dawn
Chart (2017)	Peak position
Australian Albums (ARIA)	10

== Release history ==
Release history for After Hours, Close to Dawn
Region	Date	Format	Label	Catalogue
Australia	3 March 2017	CD; LP; digital download; streaming	Dew Process	DEW9000914 /DEW9000915
Australia	2022	LP (Ltd edition re-issue)	Dew Process	DEW9001326
