= Creepin' (Kingswood song) =

Single by Kingswood

from the album After Hours, Close to Dawn
- Released: 12 October 2016
- Recorded: Nashville
- Length: 3:46
- Label: Dew Process
- Songwriter: Alex Laska

Kingswood singles chronology
"Micro Wars" (2014)	"Creepin'" (2016)	"Golden" (2017)

Music video
- "Creepin'" on YouTube

"Creepin'" is a song by Australian alternative rock band Kingswood and released on 12 October 2016 is the lead single from their second studio album, After Hours, Close to Dawn. The song was certified gold in Australia in 2025.

When asked about the themes behind the song, vocalist Fergus Lunacre told Triple J "it's about that little dark voice inside your head… Because we're all creeps."

The song was voted in at number 48 on the Triple J Hottest 100, 2016.

At the APRA Music Awards of 2018, the song was nominated for Rock Work of the Year.

== Reception ==
AM Rap via Community Broadcasting Association of Australia said "The track lures you in with its opening, soothing, psychedelic guitar notes and Fergus Linacre's tender, soulful vocals, before its jaws close down around you in the form of thunderous drum rolls and a crunching, stadium-sized bass line."

Zanda Wilson from Music Feeds said "The new track is a slow burner that builds as the lyrics profess the desire for a forbidden and unobtainable love. Moody guitar builds to a harder, grungy riff which peaks in a raucous guitar solo right in the tune's mid section."

== Music video ==
The music video was direct by Alex Laksa and features Mietta Gornall, Olivia Paine, Kristy Lee Donovan, Georgia Taylor and Kalman Warhaft.

== Certifications ==
Region	Certification	Certified units/sales
Australia (ARIA)	Gold	35,000^{‡}
^{‡} Sales+streaming figures based on certification alone.
