= Home (Kingswood album) =

Studio album by Kingswood
- Released: 24 March 2023
- Length: 48:57
- Label: Kingswood / MGM

Kingswood chronology
A Kingswood Christmas (2020)	Home (2023)	The Tale of G.C. Townes (2023)

Home is the sixth studio album by Australian alternative rock group Kingswood. The album was announced in October 2022 and released on 24 February 2023. The album peaked at number 15 on the ARIA Charts.

== Reception ==
Bruce Baker from The AU Review said "Home features rich story telling, some sweet guitars and beautiful harmonies. From the hopefull sorrow of 'One Too Many Times' the celebration of acceptance and contentment in 'Burning Holes' and the shredding guitars in 'Last One's Kicking In', Home is their strongest work to date."

Lars Brandle from Rolling Stone Australia gave the album 3.5 out of 5 describing the album as "A set that strolls deep into blues-rock territory and invites us to come along".

== Track listing ==
Home track listing
No.	Title	Writer(s)	Length
1.	"Home"	Alex Laska, Fergus Linacre	2:55
2.	"Mercy"	Laska, Linacre	3:55
3.	"Burning Holes"	Laska, Caldwell	3:30
4.	"Mother Did Say"	Laska	3:37
5.	"Heartbreak Ain't Gold"	Laska	3:53
6.	"One Too Many Times"	Laska	5:12
7.	"Good Whiskey"	Laska, Linacre	4:07
8.	"Last One's Kicking In"	Laska, Linacre	4:14
9.	"Gone Baby Gone" (CD version only)	Laska, Linacre	3:38
10.	"God & Gun"	Laska, Linacre	3:48
11.	"Movin' On"	Laska	5:19
12.	"Riches"	Laska	5:08
Total length:			48:57

== Charts ==
Chart performance for Home
Chart (2023)	Peak position
Australian Albums (ARIA)	15

== Release history ==
Release history for Home
Region	Date	Format	Label	Catalogue
Australia	24 February 2023	CD; LP; digital download; streaming	Kingswood / MGM	KINGSWOOD001CD / KINGSWOOD001LP
