= Golden (Kingswood song) =

Single by Kingswood

from the album After Hours, Close to Dawn
- Released: 3 February 2017
- Recorded: Nashville
- Length: 3:22
- Label: Dew Process
- Songwriter: Alex Laska

Kingswood singles chronology
"Creepin'" (2016)	"Golden" (2017)	"Atmosphere" (2017)

Music video
- "Golden" on YouTube

"Golden" is a song by Australian alternative rock band Kingswood and released on 3 February 2017 is the second single from their second studio album, After Hours, Close to Dawn. The song was certified gold in Australia in 2019 and platinum in 2025.

The song was voted in at number 68 on the Triple J Hottest 100, 2017.

== Reception ==
Emmy Mack from Music Feeds called the song "surprising" and "Un-Kingswood" saying the song "is light on the rock but heavy on the soul, swapping out the band's trademark chunky distorted guitar lines for a plodding organ, twinkling vibraphone, cheeky horns and feather-light drums."

Andrew Massie from The Rock Pit said "Golden is a seductive, slow jam, which again highlights the unexpected and subtler nuances about what lies beneath Kingswood's rock n' roll swagger."

== Music video ==
The music video was filmed at Parramatta's Historic War Memorial Swimming Centre, stars Aussie Olympic diver Brittany O'Brien and was released in February 2017. Speaking about the clip, guitarist Alex Laska told triple J that O'Brien's high-diving antics are a metaphor that "reflects the idea of a lonesome high". Laska said "I've often thought diving must be so exhilarating / euphoric but only really enjoyed by the few who pursue it. In a way, it reflects that ideas behind the song by representing elements of that feeling only you are left with after a specific emotional experience."

== Certifications ==
Region	Certification	Certified units/sales
Australia (ARIA)	Platinum	70,000^{‡}
^{‡} Sales+streaming figures based on certification alone.
