= Microscopic Wars =

Studio album by Kingswood
- Released: 22 August 2014
- Length: 42:53
- Label: Dew Process
- Producer: Vance Powell

Kingswood albums chronology
| Change of Heart (2012) | Microscopic Wars (2014) | After Hours, Close to Dawn (2017) |

Microscopic Wars is the debut studio album by Australian alternative rock group Kingswood. The album was announced in early July 2014 and released on 22 August 2014. The album peaked at number 6 on the ARIA Charts.

At the 2014 ARIA Music Awards, the album was nominated for Best Rock Album.

The group celebrated the 10th anniversary of the album with an Australian tour and album re-release.

== Reception ==
Alastair McGibbon from Forte Magazine said "Microscopic Wars is one of those rare rock albums that truly shines from start to finish, with the band combining a wide range of styles and sounds into a set of songs that make for one hell of a debut album. I expected big things from these boys, and they certainly delivered."

A staff writer from The Music gave the album 4 out of 5 said "they could easily fall into a straight forward radio rock trap, overuse their olden day influences and become the next Wolfmother, they instead opt to put as many twists and turns in as possible while maintaining a cohesive edge to their music that is utterly enjoyable"

Nicholas Jones from Tone Deaf said "The 13-track long-player sees the quartet explore a plethora of sounds, from dry desert tunes to wailing blues, mind-bending psychedelica and space-rock atmospherics, surprising mournful piano ballads to punk rock ferocities, Microscopic Wars confidently offers a sonic slice for any palate."

== Track listing ==
Microscopic Wars track listing
| No. | Title | Writer(s) | Length |
|---|---|---|---|
| 1. | "All Too Much" | Justin Debrincat, Alex Laska, Fergus Linacre | 3:10 |
| 2. | "Suckerpunch" | Debrincat | 3:43 |
| 3. | "ICFTYDLM" (I Can Feel That You Don't Love Me) | Debrincat | 3:44 |
| 4. | "Micro Wars" | Debrincat | 4:08 |
| 5. | "So Long" | Debrincat | 3:04 |
| 6. | "Ohio" | Jeremy "Mango" Hunter, Laska, Linacre | 3:47 |
| 7. | "Hours" | Debrincat | 0:36 |
| 8. | "Side to Side" | Debrincat | 3:44 |
| 9. | "Tremor" | Debrincat | 3:09 |
| 10. | "Eye of the Storm" | Laska, Linacre | 4:17 |
| 11. | "She's My Baby" | Debrincat | 2:47 |
| 12. | "Piece By Piece" | Laska, Linacre | 3:24 |
| 13. | "Chronos" | Debrincat | 3:12 |
| Total length: | | | 42:53 |

Microscopic Wars (deluxe bonus disc)
| No. | Title | Length |
|---|---|---|
| 1. | "Vlad" |
| 2. | "Baby Doll" |
| 3. | "ICFTYDLM" (live) |
| 4. | "So Long" (live) |
| 5. | "Ohio" (live) |
| 6. | "Sucker Punch" (live) |
| 7. | "Tremor" (live) |

== Charts ==
Chart performance for Microscopic Wars
| Chart (2014) | Peak position |
|---|---|
| Australian Albums (ARIA) | 6 |

== Release history ==
Release history for Microscopic Wars
| Region | Date | Format | Label | Catalogue |
|---|---|---|---|---|
| Australia | 22 August 2014 | CD; digital download; streaming | Dew Process | DEW9000690 |
| Australia | November 2014 | LP | Dew Process | DEW9000705 |
| Australia | 2015 | 2xCD (deluxe); digital download | Dew Process | DEW76266 |
| Australia | 2022 | LP (Ltd edition re-issue) | Dew Process | DEW9001327 |
| Australia | August 2024 | LP (10th Anniversary re-issue) | Kingswood | KW202400001 |
