= Chloe Brennan =

Fictional character from the Australian soap opera Neighbours

- Neighbours character
- Portrayed by: April Rose Pengilly
- Duration: 2018–2023
- First appearance: 27 March 2018
- Last appearance: 28 December 2023
- Introduced by: Jason Herbison
In-universe information
- Occupation: Executive assistant Lassiters general manager
- Father: Russell Brennan
- Mother: Fay Brennan
- Brothers: Mark Brennan; Aaron Brennan
- Half-brothers: Tyler Brennan
- Husband: Pierce Greyson (2019–2021)
- Wife: Elly Conway (2023–)
- Stepsons: Hendrix Greyson
- Stepdaughters: Aster Conway
- Nieces: Isla Tanaka-Brennan

Chloe Brennan is a fictional character from the Australian television soap opera Neighbours, played by April Rose Pengilly. Pengilly auditioned for the role without knowing anything about the character. Not long after she made plans to move to Los Angeles, Pengilly was invited for a screen test and she was offered the part of Chloe a week later. Neighbours marks her first regular television role, and she made her debut during the episode broadcast on 27 March 2018. Chloe is the sister of the established Brennan brothers, and had often been mentioned on-screen by her family prior to her arrival. Chloe is portrayed as "well-meaning", "carefree" and "fun-loving". She wants to get along with everyone and live her life to the fullest. However, she also suffers from intimacy and "daddy issues", due to her upbringing which saw her raised by her mother following her parents' separation.

Chloe comes to Erinsborough to reconnect with her brothers Mark Brennan (Scott McGregor) and Aaron Brennan (Matt Wilson), following their father's death. Shortly after her introduction, writers established a romantic relationship between Chloe and her boss Leo Tanaka (Tim Kano). An ongoing, issue-led storyline saw Chloe diagnosed with Huntington's disease. Pengilly enjoyed exploring another side to her character, and she hoped the story arc would raise awareness of the condition among viewers. Chloe comes into conflict with her family, neighbours and boss when she launches an escort service, which sees her charging men for platonic dates. The plot led to the introduction of millionaire businessman Pierce Greyson (Tim Robards), who develops strong feelings for her.

Towards the end of 2018, producers decided to explore Chloe's bisexuality and began an unrequited love story as Chloe falls in love with Mark's girlfriend Elly Conway (Jodi Anasta). Her former girlfriend Melissa Lohan (Jacqui Purvis) was also introduced leading to further exploration of Chloe's fictional backstory. For her portrayal of Chloe, Pengilly was included on the long list for the Logie Award for Most Popular New Talent, despite not having appeared on-screen when voting opened. She also received a nomination for Best Soap Newcomer at the 2018 Digital Spy Reader Awards. Pengilly won Best Daytime Star at the 2021 Inside Soap Awards.

Chloe appeared up to the finale episode of Neighbours, which aired on 28 July 2022, and returned for the reboot on 13 November 2023. Pengilly left the show again on 28 December 2023 after Chloe and Elly Conway got married.

== Casting ==
The character is the sister of the established Brennan brothers; Mark (Scott McGregor), Aaron (Matt Wilson), and Tyler (Travis Burns) who were introduced in 2010 and 2015 respectively. Chloe has been mentioned by her family on-screen several times, and Wilson teased her introduction in July 2017, saying "The Brennan family is expanding – we have got our mum coming onto the show, and a sister we have been talking about for years." On 1 March 2018, Alison Stephenson for The Daily Telegraph confirmed that actress and model April Rose Pengilly had been cast in the role of Chloe. Pengilly was asked to send over an audition tape to the producers using a "random" script they sent her. She was not given any details or description of the character she was reading for. The actress admitted that she "didn't think much of it", as she made plans to move to Los Angeles for work in September 2017. She explained, "I think it's a goal for most Aussie actors to be on one of these iconic Aussie shows that is beloved world wide, but I'd kind of given up on it, my goal was America."

Pengilly received a call asking her to fly to Melbourne for a screen test, as the producers had narrowed it down to herself and another actor. She met with the actors playing Chloe's brothers and love interest. She learned that she had won the role a week later. While the producers selected Pengilly for the role of Chloe over Bonnie Anderson, they also created the role of Bea Nilsson for the latter. Majella Davis, who later played Krista Sinclair, also auditioned for the role. Pengilly said that she was asked why she was still in Australia and not Los Angeles, but she tried to "lay low" in an attempt to keep her casting a secret. After dying her hair blonder for the role, Pengilly spent six months posting photos of herself as a brunette on social media and setting Sydney as her location. Neighbours marks Pengilly's first regular television role, and she commutes between her home in Sydney and the studio in Melbourne. She found that Chloe was "one of the most fun, interesting roles I've ever been offered and I'm already having a ball playing her." The show's executive producer Jason Herbison said the crew were "delighted" to introduce Chloe and praised Pengilly's casting, saying she "brought a fantastic energy to the character". Pengilly made her debut appearance as Chloe on 27 March 2018.

== Development ==
=== Characterisation ===
After reading the character biography, Pengilly thought the role could have been written just for her, as she and Chloe share a lot of similarities. She explained, "There are a lot of elements of my personality that are slight, but have been amped up to 100 per cent with Chloe. Sometimes my big mouth gets me into trouble like it does her, too!." Pengilly described Chloe as a "well-meaning person", who sometimes does or says the wrong thing, but never intends to hurt anyone. Pengilly likened Chloe to a puppy who "stumbles into trouble!" She also called her "very adventurous and very fun-loving", with "a big heart". Pengilly also told Daniel Kilkelly of Digital Spy, "She's not a bad girl, but she wants everything to be fun. She wants to get on with everyone and she wants to live life to the fullest."

The character was also described as having a good sense of humour and being "a whirlwind of creative energy" by the serial's official website. She often hides her vulnerability and worries about getting hurt. The character's look is "casual feminine boho chic", a style worn by actresses Teresa Palmer and Sienna Miller. Pengilly confirmed that Chloe dates both men and women, saying she was "very carefree and open to everything life has to offer. She doesn't like to set limitations on anything." Chloe suffers from intimacy and "daddy issues", so she tries not to get close to her partners. Pengilly hoped Chloe was living up to the audience's expectations, as they had been teased about her introduction for a long time.

=== Introduction ===
"In the wake of everything with Tyler and with their father passing away, it's time for her to come home and face the music."

— Pengilly on Chloe's reason for visiting her brothers. (2018)

In her fictional backstory, Chloe was in her early teens when her parents' separated, and she was raised away from her father and brothers by her mother Fay Brennan (Zoe Bertram) in Adelaide. The official show website said that Chloe did not have any contact with her father from that point and she saw her brothers very little, which left her feeling like an only child. After deciding against going to university, Chloe spent her time working various jobs, including waitressing, nannying and working on a minor celebrity's yacht.

The character was introduced shortly after Burns left his role as Tyler Brennan. Chloe comes to Erinsborough to be with her brothers Aaron and Mark, after spending years travelling overseas on "an extended gap year". After running out of money, Chloe visits her brothers to repair their fractured relationships, but Mark is aware that she could leave as suddenly as she arrived. Pengilly felt like she had real brothers in McGregor and Wilson, as they were very welcoming towards her when she started, and she said her favourite scenes to film were set in the Brennan house.

After arriving in Erinsborough, Chloe meets up with Mark and they go to the local coffee shop to catch up. Mark's former girlfriend Elly Conway (Jodi Anasta) sees them together and is "curious" about the newcomer, but she is angered when she sees Chloe going through Mark's wallet after he leaves it unattended. Elly comes over to confront Chloe and "a tug-of-war" ensues as she tries to take back the wallet, which results in some of her hair being pulled out. When Mark returns, Elly tells him his date is stealing from him, but he reveals that Chloe is actually his younger sister. Chloe then upsets Tyler's former girlfriend Piper Willis (Mavournee Hazel) when she asks how long she plans to stay in Tyler's room, as she was hoping to move in there. Pengilly commented that Chloe is not very "tactful" in the way she approaches the situation with Piper. Aaron eventually gives her his room.

Chloe later meets Elly again and openly admits that she is experimental when it comes to relationships and would not mind with "experimenting" with her some day, leaving Elly "horrified by her forward attitude." Aaron is happy to have his sister around, but Mark is more cautious, knowing that trouble tends to follow Chloe around. When Chloe successfully applies for an executive assistant job at Lassiters Hotel, Brandon Danker (Nick Bracks) is tasked with checking her CV and it soon emerges that she has lied about her skills and previous jobs. Chloe decides to seduce Brandon in a bid to keep her job, and invites him to spend time with her in the spa at Number 32. They are soon interrupted by returning character Jane Harris (Annie Jones), who disapproves of their antics.

=== Relationship with Leo Tanaka ===
Writers soon established a casual relationship between Chloe and her boss Leo Tanaka (Tim Kano). The storyline begins when Leo is ordered by Terese Willis (Rebekah Elmaloglou) to fire Chloe for incompetency, after she evicts lawyer Toadfish Rebecchi (Ryan Moloney) from his office within the Lassiters complex. Leo decides not to fire Chloe when she resolves the situation with Toadie. He then makes a romantic advance towards her. A Neighbours publicist told Claire Crick of Soaplife that "Leo realises that maybe there's more to bolshy Chloe than meets the eye and he tries to seduce her." Chloe turns him down, as she does not want to risk her job. However, after she reads "a mysterious" email that leaves her "shaken", Chloe returns to Leo's office and crawls across his desk to kiss him. A stunt coordinator was hired to go through safety procedures for Chloe's desk crawl. Pengilly had to practice crawling across the desk, so that she was safe and that the desk did not break. Kano commented, "I did feel for her having to do that and being so new. We had to practice over and over."

Kano thought it was a classic rebound storyline for his character, who broke up with his girlfriend shortly beforehand. He also thought that Leo and Chloe "definitely have great chemistry". He also admitted that some of the scenes between the characters may not have made it past the censor, and he was interested to see how much would have to be edited for the show's early evening time slot. In a later interview, Kano said Leo was capable of developing genuine feelings for Chloe despite the initial fun and casual nature of their relationship. He also pointed out that their affair could have consequences for them professionally, as Lassiters has a policy asking staff members not to date one another. He commented, "So I think it's destined for failure, but that's what makes it so exciting. The possibility of getting caught creates a thrill."

Chloe and Leo are caught kissing in his office by Chloe's mother Fay, who comes to Erinsborough unannounced. Fay is "not impressed" with Chloe, and later reveals that she is being forced to sell her house to cover Chloe's debts. The couple are also blackmailed by Brandon after he discovers their affair, but they continue to sneak around. They are eventually found out when they are late for Aaron and David Tanaka's (Takaya Honda) engagement party. They become trapped in the loft of the Backpackers' hostel when Terese arrives. Both Mark and Leo's father Paul Robinson (Stefan Dennis) realise that they are together and come to confront them. Paul then demotes Leo for being "unprofessional". Leo later asks Chloe to continue their relationship now it is out in the open, but she turns him down, saying that it was only fun for her when they were trying to keep it a secret.

=== Huntington's disease diagnosis ===
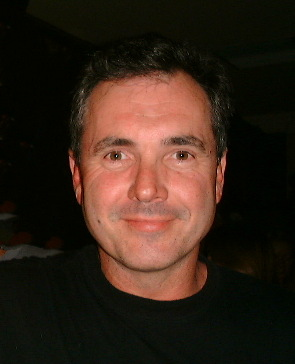
Karl Kennedy, played by Alan Fletcher (pictured), gives Chloe her diagnosis and becomes her confidant.

In August 2018, an issue-led storyline for the character began when she is diagnosed with Huntington's disease. Prior to the diagnosis, Chloe receives several letters and emails from a clinic in the United States, where she underwent some genetic medical trials in return for money. Pengilly explained that Chloe puts off getting her results, as she fears getting bad news and she is worried that the frequency of the letters means there is something seriously wrong. Chloe eventually speaks with Doctor Karl Kennedy (Alan Fletcher) about the trials. He later informs her that the results show that she has Huntington's disease, a hereditary condition which results in the death of brain cells. Pengilly said Chloe is "stunned" by the news and she feels helpless because there is no cure. Karl later explains that her mother and brothers could have the condition too, which concerns her more than her own diagnosis.

Speaking to Charlie Milward of the Daily Express, Pengilly stated that she had not heard of Huntington's disease before the storyline. She was initially shocked upon receiving it, but she was "grateful" to be given the opportunity to raise awareness among the show's viewers. Pengilly spoke with the writers, and carried out her own research, so she could "sensitively and accurately" portray someone with the condition. Chloe chooses to keep her diagnosis a secret until after Aaron and David's wedding, as she does not want to ruin their moment. Pengilly commented, "She thinks she should keep carrying the burden alone." She later said that Chloe thinks telling them would be "selfish". Karl begs Chloe to tell her family, as they need to be tested for the gene too. Pengilly enjoyed working with Fletcher on the storyline, calling the opportunity "a dream". Pengilly also enjoyed exploring another side to her character, but she preferred the lighter scenes where Chloe is the comic relief, saying "comedy is my jam".

Chloe struggles in the wake of her diagnosis and takes a sick day from work, before inviting Amy Williams (Zoe Cramond) on a girls night out. She steals some money from the family fund for alcohol. Chloe and Amy are joined by Chloe's friend Danielle Southgate (Annie Lumsden) and the women proceed to get drunk. After Amy goes home early, Chloe and Danielle steal the Ramsay Street sign, resulting in Chloe's arrest. Mark has to bail his sister out and tells her that the money she took was for their mother's food shopping. In an effort to pay her mother back, Chloe organises a games room at Lassiters where she earns tips. The storyline was revisited in November 2018 when Chloe finally tells her siblings about her diagnosis. Chloe is forced to reveal her secret when Aaron and David plan to have a child using Aaron's sperm. After failing to persuade the couple to let David be the donor, she tells Mark and Aaron that she has the Huntington's gene and they could have it too. Mark decides to get tested straight away, but Aaron refuses, saying that he would rather not know.

=== Escort business ===
In the wake of her Huntington's diagnosis, Chloe launches a new business venture, Cash4Company which sees her charging men for dates. Pengilly told Sarah Ellis of Inside Soap that she did not see the storyline coming, but she understood that her character was desperate to pay back her mother. She explained, "Chloe loves meeting new people anyway and she sets a lot of ground rules with the business. It's absolutely platonic – it's being friendly to people who are lonely, while also finding a way to pay her mum back. So Chloe thinks it's win-win, really." The storyline begins with Chloe accepting a lunch date with rich widower Orion Ibraheim (Simon Barbaro), who gives her $300 at the end of the date. Chloe realises that she can build a business and improve her financial situation. Orion's friend Harrison Keller (Chris Hanrahan) asks her out, which brings Chloe into conflict with Mark, who disapproves of her meeting up with men for money. Mark researches Chloe's client on social media to see if he can be trusted, before interrupting the date to tell Chloe that Harrison is married, however, Chloe reveals that she already knows and Harrison leaves. Chloe then confronts her brother for ruining the date. Pengilly branded Mark "the disapproving father figure".

Chloe's business also brings her into conflict with neighbour Dipi Rebecchi (Sharon Johal), who hears that her husband Shane Rebecchi (Nicholas Coghlan) has been using Chloe's services. Speaking to Johnathon Hughes of the Radio Times, Pengilly explained that Shane actually asks Chloe for some information about her latest client, as he wants to do business with him. When Dipi later sees Chloe and Shane talking, she confronts them, leading Chloe to fall back onto some rubbish. Pengilly commented that Chloe "had the best intentions and was trying to help Shane and his family, unfortunately the wires are definitely crossed..." Both Pengilly and Johal admitted that they were opposed to how the scene was originally written, which saw their characters engage in "a classic cat fight" and had Dipi slut shame Chloe for her choices. The actresses changed their characters' dialogue as much as they could, and the finished scene moved the blame onto Shane instead of Chloe. Pengilly later wrote that she and Johal thought it was "inappropriate" for Dipi to pin the blame on Chloe, while keeping Shane out of it, despite initially believing that he was cheating on her.

The incident with Dipi exposes Chloe's business and Paul fears that it will have an effect on Lassiters, so he wants her fired. But when Chloe catches Leo and Terese together and realises they are dating, she blackmails them into helping her keep her job. When Hughes questioned if that was somewhat harsh, Pengilly replied "I think Chloe is indignant because Terese is very judgemental about Cash4Company and doesn't stand up for her at first. When Chloe and Leo were caught together in the office that time Terese deemed it inappropriate and Chloe was practically forced into ending things with him. It's double standards and very hypocritical now Terese is sneaking around and Chloe is quite annoyed." The actress said Chloe takes "a moral standpoint" for being told off for something Terese is also doing. Chloe later finds herself in an awkward situation when a mother asks her to take her son's virginity on his 21st birthday in return for payment.

==== Pierce Greyson ====
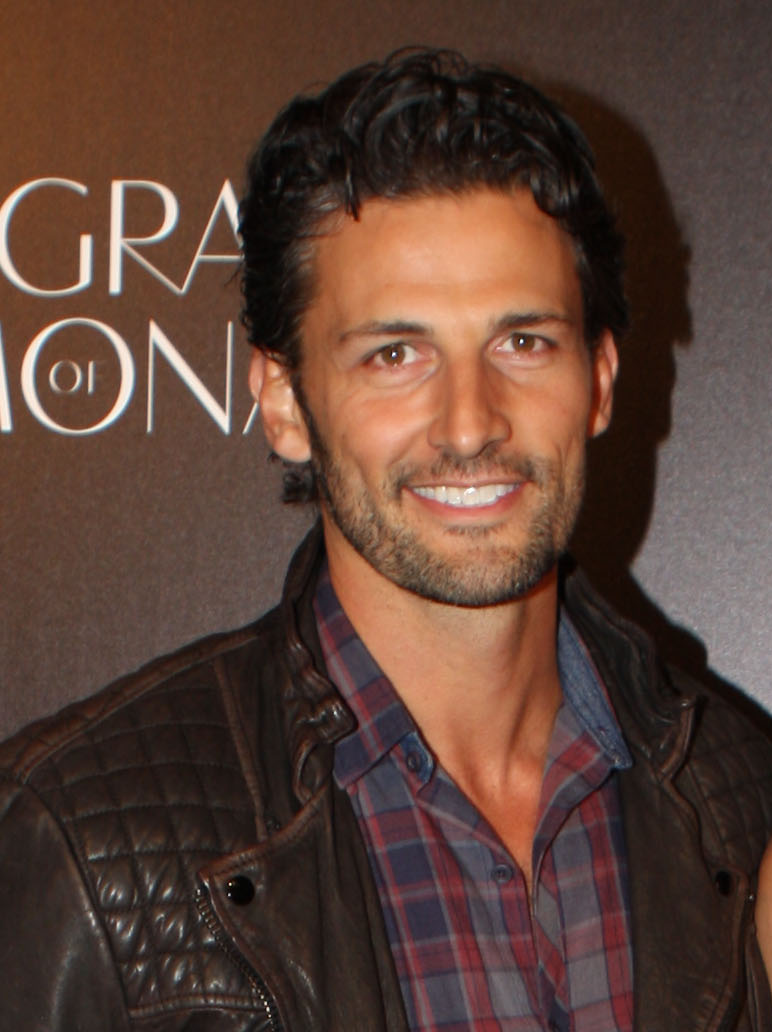
Tim Robards (pictured) portrayed businessman Pierce Greyson, Chloe's client and later lover.

When Hughes (Radio Times) asked Pengilly if Chloe would find romance through her business, she told him that it was possible, but Chloe had closed herself off to starting a long-term relationship because of her Huntington's diagnosis. Not long after, producers introduced multi-millionaire businessman Pierce Greyson (Tim Robards) to Chloe's storyline. Pierce is "a charming multi-millionaire", who comes to Erinsborough to complete a deal with the Lassiters brand. After discovering Chloe's business, Pierce asks to become one of her clients, but is rejected as Chloe does not want to jeopardise the deal. However, Pierce persists and books Chloe's services using a pseudonym. Their date goes well, and leads to another during which Chloe tells him about her brother Tyler's upcoming release from prison. At the end of the night, Pierce asks Chloe to spend the night with him in return for payment, but Chloe decides not to go. She later admits to Elly that she may reconsider, and after rejecting Elly's "well-meaning advice", Chloe goes to Pierce's room and he gives her a necklace, but she turns down his proposition.

While helping Pierce organise a wine tasting event, Chloe hugs him upon hearing that Tyler is being released, which leads to them having sex. Chloe is left "confused" when Pierce sends her the necklace and a bottle of wine afterwards, as she thought that they had had sex for "fun", but she realises that Pierce may see it as a transaction instead. She confides in Elly, who encourages her to speak to Pierce about their relationship, but Chloe chooses to keep the gifts and focus her attention on Tyler's imminent return. Speaking to the Metro's Katie Baillie, Pengilly said "Initially Chloe does really like Pierce and she initiates taking the relationship further, but she's not up for anything serious or long term which she's quite clear about, and he agrees."

Pierce is also brought into Terese's storyline when she plots a takeover of Lassiters from Paul. He joins forces with her, but she is unaware that he does not really care for the hotel and all of his focus is on Chloe, who is starting to feel "overwhelmed" especially when Pierce presents her with a ring. Of Pierce's feelings towards Chloe, Robards commented "He sees her business almost as a challenge to get her to fall a bit deeper. He wasn't expecting it, but he realises he has feelings for this girl." Chloe wants to end the relationship, but worries that Pierce will pull out of the takeover plans, something which he later confirms.

Pierce and Chloe's storyline comes to a conclusion when he takes her to a ski resort. Chloe is initially surprised by the offer to accompany him on a business trip, as she has just told him that she is uncomfortable with how their relationship has been progressing. But Chloe thinks she will be able to convince Pierce to finalise the Lassiters deal during the trip, so she can be free. However, Pierce does not want to do business once they reach the resort, leaving Chloe feeling "trapped". In an attempt to put him off pursuing a long-term relationship with her, Chloe tells Pierce about her Huntington's diagnosis, but he vows to care for her as the disease progresses, so Chloe decides to run away and leaves their cabin in the middle of the night. Chloe asks Elly to bring her passport to her, so she can leave the country, but Elly convinces her to stay and continue repairing her relationships with her brothers.

=== Crush on Elly Conway ===
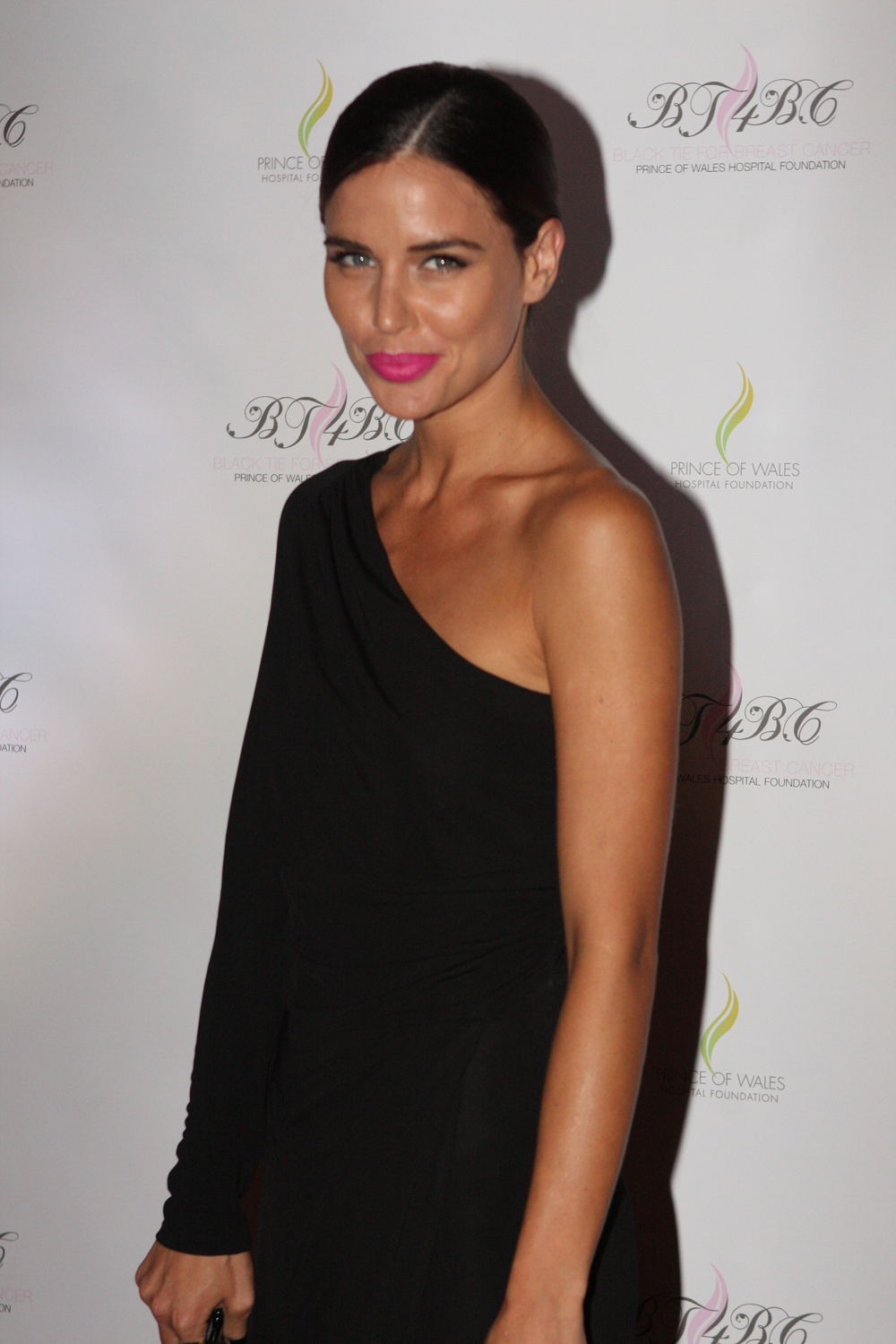
Chloe develops a crush on her brother's partner Elly Conway, played by Jodi Anasta (pictured), leading to exploration of her bisexuality.

Towards the end of 2018, producers decided to explore Chloe's bisexuality and began a "long-term story of unrequited love" as Chloe develops a crush on Elly, her friend and Mark's girlfriend. After Elly loses her job at the local high school, she confides in Chloe about her feelings of loss and devastation. In an effort to cheer Elly up, Chloe arranges for them to spend a fun afternoon at home together. As they drink wine and discuss their recent problems, they admit how much they care for one another and Chloe kisses Elly. Anasta said that for Elly the kiss is "very unexpected" and "obviously awkward", as she is in a relationship with Chloe's brother. Anasta supported her character's decision not to tell Mark, saying "She doesn't tell Mark because she doesn't want it to ruin their relationship, and she also wants to protect Chloe. I think she's doing the right thing, as she doesn't want to mess with that family dynamic."

When asked if the storyline came as a surprise, Pengilly referred to her character's impulsive nature and commented that the kiss was "classic Chloe". She also pointed out that Chloe's bisexuality has been mentioned on a few occasions and she has flirted with Elly in the past, but it had largely been left unexplored. Pengilly and the writers made sure that Chloe's sexuality was not "the defining aspect of her personality" and the storyline was not "exploitative". Following the kiss, Elly is keen to talk about it and make sure Chloe is okay, but Chloe would rather forget it happened. However, her feelings for Elly become stronger and she struggles to keep them to herself. Elly and Mark get engaged shortly afterwards, leaving Chloe "heartbroken". During Elly and Mark's engagement party, Chloe gets drunk and reveals her Huntington's diagnosis during a spontaneous toast. As Elly is attending to her outside, Chloe tells her she loves her.

Chloe later writes Elly a Christmas card in which she reveals exactly how she is feeling and ends up declaring her love for her. Elly is "touched" by the gesture, but remains committed to her relationship with Mark. Elly and Chloe's bond grows after they are involved in a siege at the local cafe and they turn to each other for support. Aaron notices their closeness and when he encourages Chloe to open up to him, she admits that she is in love with Elly. Pengilly explained to an Inside Soap columnist, "It's bittersweet for Chloe, being so close to Elly, yet so far. She can't take the pressure any more, and she ends up telling Aaron in a moment of desperation." The actress also revealed that she actually suggested that Elly and Chloe should get together when she joined the cast, but she was "basically laughed out of the room!" However, some viewers noticed chemistry between the characters and asked for the story.

Producers soon introduced Chloe's former girlfriend Melissa "Mel" Lohan (Jacqui Purvis), leading to further exploration of Chloe's background. Aaron contacts Mel and invites her to Erinsborough in an effort to cheer Chloe up, but he "instantly regrets" his actions when their mother Fay tells him that Chloe would probably not want to see Mel. Aaron also angers Chloe with his attempts to "supervise" her and Elly when they spend time together. There is initial tension between the former couple, as Mel left Chloe in "a dangerous situation" when the relationship came to an end. Mel apologises to Chloe, explaining that she has changed, and Chloe accepts the apology. In a bid to suppress her feelings for Elly, Chloe finds Mel during Elly's hen night and kisses her. When Elly returns home, she finds Chloe and Mel together on the couch. Chloe and Mel decide to give their relationship another go. Pengilly said that Chloe hopes it will work out between them, as she does have feelings for Mel. However, Pengilly confirmed that "it is a bit too good to be true" and Mel betrays Chloe yet again.

== Storylines ==
Chloe comes to Erinsborough to be with her brothers Aaron and Mark, after spending years travelling overseas on "an extended gap year". After running out of money, Chloe visits her brothers to repair their fractured relationships. After arriving in Erinsborough, Chloe meets up with Mark and they go to the local coffee shop to catch up. Mark's former girlfriend Elly Conway (Jodi Anasta) sees them together and is "curious" about the newcomer, but she is angered when she sees Chloe going through Mark's wallet after he leaves it unattended. Elly comes over to confront Chloe and "a tug-of-war" ensues as she tries to take back the wallet, which results in some of her hair being pulled out. When Mark returns, Elly tells him his date is stealing from him, but he reveals that Chloe is actually his younger sister. Chloe then upsets Tyler's former girlfriend Piper Willis (Mavournee Hazel) when she asks how long she plans to stay in Tyler's room, as she was hoping to move in there. Aaron is happy to have his sister back, but Mark isn't convinced on her true intentions.

Months later she is diagnosed with Huntington's disease. Prior to the diagnosis, Chloe receives several letters and emails from a clinic in the United States, where she underwent some genetic medical trials in return for money. Chloe eventually speaks with Doctor Karl Kennedy (Alan Fletcher) about the trials. He later informs her that the results show that she has Huntington's disease, a hereditary condition which results in the death of brain cells. Chloe is forced to reveal her secret when Aaron and David plan to have a child using Aaron's sperm. After failing to persuade the couple to let David be the donor, she tells Mark and Aaron that she has the Huntington's gene and they could have it too. Mark decides to get tested straight away, but Aaron refuses, saying that he would rather not know. In the wake of her Huntington's diagnosis, Chloe launches a new business venture, Cash4Company which sees her charging men for dates. Chloe's business also brings her into conflict with neighbour Dipi Rebecchi (Sharon Johal), who hears that her husband Shane Rebecchi (Nicholas Coghlan) has been using Chloe's services. The incident with Dipi exposes Chloe's business and Paul fears that it will have an effect on Lassiters, so he wants her fired. But when Chloe catches Leo and Terese together and realises they are dating, she blackmails them into helping her keep her job. After discovering Chloe's business, Pierce asks to become one of her clients, but is rejected as Chloe does not want to jeopardise the deal.However, Pierce persists and books Chloe's services using a pseudonym. Their date goes well, and leads to another during which Chloe tells him about her brother Tyler's upcoming release from prison. At the end of the night, Pierce asks Chloe to spend the night with him in return for payment, but Chloe decides not to go. She later admits to Elly that she may reconsider, and after rejecting Elly's "well-meaning advice", Chloe goes to Pierce's room and he gives her a necklace, but she turns down his proposition.

While helping Pierce organise a wine tasting event, Chloe hugs him upon hearing that Tyler is being released, which leads to them having sex. Chloe is confused when Pierce sends her the necklace and a bottle of wine afterwards, as she thought that they had had sex for fun, but she realises that Pierce may see it as a transaction instead. She confides in Elly, who encourages her to speak to Pierce about their relationship, but Chloe chooses to keep the gifts and focus her attention on Tyler's imminent return. After Elly loses her job at the local high school, she confides in Chloe about her feelings of loss and devastation. In an effort to cheer Elly up, Chloe arranges for them to spend a fun afternoon at home together. As they drink wine and discuss their recent problems, they admit how much they care for one another and Chloe kisses Elly.

Mark later finds out about this on Elly and his wedding day. Pierce eventually returns to Erinsborough for a wine deal with Lassiter's. They get back together however there is tension when Chloe finds out that pierce has a teenage son Hendrix. Hendrix develops a crush on Chloe and kisses her and she rejects him. Pierce and Chloe get engaged soon after. Hendrix believes this is way too soon but Chloe explains that they are moving so fast because of her Huntington's disease and he understands. They get married at Pierce's vineyard and have another ceremony in Adelaide so the rest of her family can attend.

After they got married they had some dramas about whether they should have kids. As pierce wanted kids but Chloe was worried about being a mum when she has Huntington's disease. They thought of fostering a child but were rejected by the agency. Chloe later finds out that she is pregnant and Terese and Paul find out before Pierce. She does not immediately tell him as she is unsure what to do. They take a test to see if the baby will have Huntington's and the results come back with low indicators so they decide to have the baby.

During this time Nicolette moves in with Chloe and Pierce to be a in house nurse for Faye. Chloe is unsure about letting Nicolette be the nurse as she had confessed that she loved Chloe. Pierce grows jealous about Nicolette and Chloe's friendship believing that Chloe may be developing feelings for her. Chloe assures pierce that she only sees Nicolette as a friend. Pierce confides in Dipi and they develop a friendship due to them both having issues in their marriage. They later begin an affair with pierce gifting her a necklace he originally bought Chloe that she rejected. They get caught by Chloe in a hotel room. Chloe is very mad at pierce and moves into David and Aaron's. She is unsure whether to end the marriage but they both decide that their marriage is over and pierce gives her the house.

She moved back in for a bit and considered renting it out however she ends up staying there. She gets mad at Hendrix when she discovers he was holding illegal black jack games at the house and bet the house. Chloe finds out Nicolette planted the necklace for Chloe to find out about the affair and she is very mad dismissing Nicolette.

They later reconnect and start dating which David and Aaron are not very supportive of as she is carrying their baby and it could create drama. Nicolette moves into the house with her mother Jane. When pierce comes back to town he tells Chloe her relationship is moving to fast and not to trust Nicolette. She begins to think maybe he is right but continues her relationship with Nicolette. Pierce also tells her that Nicolette called the baby hers and Chloe's which makes everybody worried. Leo later comes into town to buy the vineyard from Pierce. They create a plan to offer chloe a job at the vineyard so they can get intel on her relationship with Nicolette. Nicolette visits the vineyard and has a fall. Chloe believes she should turn down the role so she can take care of Nicolette but Nicolette says that's not necessary. Chloe begins confiding in Leo about her relationship issues and how she thinks they are moving to fast. Leo suggests that Chloe should tell Nicolette to move in with Aaron and David so it is easier with the baby. She is about to tell her but finds Nicolette has set up a romantic surprise near the lake where she proposes and Chloe says yes even though she is reluctant.

At the engagement party Nicolette keeps talking about how they are going to have kids and Chloe feels overwhelmed. Chloe and Leo spend a night at the vineyard together where they say that there is a late function on. Chloe wakes up with only Leo's jacket on and believes they slept with each other she calls Leo to confirm and he does not answer. She tells Nicolette she thinks she cheated and Nicolette ends up running away to Canberra while still pregnant. Chloe finds out she did not sleep with Leo and fell into a puddle and wore Leo's jacket since her clothes were wet. She goes to Nicolette but finds out she has disappeared.

While Nicolette is gone she misses her. She takes time off work and when she returns tension erupts between her and Harlow. As Harlow was taking over Chloe's job while she away. Harlow is meant to be demoted to housekeeping but Paul has other plans and creates a new role for her that deals with organizing events which comes under Chloe's role. Harlow remains in housekeeping as there is a strike when she gets promoted due to nepotism. When Nicolette returns Chloe wants to get back with her though Nicolette rejects her. Chloe supports Kyle when she finds out he has cancer, they grow closer as friends since she can understand his fear about kids and dying as she has Huntington's disease. Chloe invites Mckenzie, Freya and Kiri to live with her in No. 24, she develops a crush on Kiri who Nicolette is also attracted to. They have sex with each other, but there is no chemistry so they decide not to pursue a relationship. Chloe later decides to sell No. 24 as she wants to move to Adelaide to be with the rest of her family. On a trip back to Erinsborough it is revealed she met up with Elly. Elly later comes back, telling Chloe she wants her to move to Sydney so they can be together. Chloe is unsure if Elly is ready for a relationship with her after some convincing Chloe decides to move to Sydney with Elly where she gets a job at Lassiters Sydney. Two years later, Chloe returns to Erinsborough to help run Lassiters, following the absences of Paul and the new co-owner's daughter Reece Sinclair (Mischa Barton). Chloe experiences an increase in her Huntington's disease symptoms, and when Elly eventually joins her, she offers her the chance to leave their relationship before her condition worsens. Elly proposes to Chloe, who accepts. The couple marry at the pavilion in front of their family and friends, before leaving for their honeymoon that same day, which Paul pays for.

== Reception ==
Pengilly's inclusion on the long list for the Logie Award for Most Popular New Talent caused some controversy, as she had not yet appeared on-screen. By the time voting closed, Pengilly had only appeared in four episodes. Of the situation, TV Week stated "It is up to the networks to submit the talent they feel is most deserving of an award." Later that year, Pengilly received a nomination for Best Soap Newcomer at the 2018 Digital Spy Reader Awards; she received 5.9% of the vote putting her in sixth place. She was longlisted for Best Daytime Star at the 2019 Inside Soap Awards. Pengilly won the Best Daytime Star accolade in 2021.

Inside Soap's Sarah Ellis said the character was "much-hyped" ahead of her introduction, and branded her a "wild child" once she made her debut. Ellis also said Chloe had "certainly caused a stir since landing on Ramsay Street!" Claire Crick of Soaplife commented that Mark and Aaron's lives were "about to be turned upside-down, and not necessarily for the better, when their sister, Chloe, arrives..." Crick also observed that Chloe "doesn't waste any time making her presence felt on Ramsay Street – and it soon becomes clear she's used to rubbing people up the wrong way!" Pengilly found that viewers took to her character quickly, saying "I've had nothing but incredible fan support, and I'm so grateful the viewers have embraced me the way they have."

Chloe was the focus of a Tenplay article asking if she was "A Bit Wild, Or Psycho?" The writer looked at the character's early scenes and stated, "The bohemian Brennan sister has started ruffling feathers. But with her big smile and blasé attitude to everything, it's hard to tell if she's just a bit of a free spirit, or a bit of a sociopath." Huntington's Victoria, a service that supports those who have been impacted by Huntington's disease praised Neighbours for raising awareness of the condition through Chloe's storyline.

At the end of 2018, Daniel Kilkelly of Digital Spy included Pengilly in his feature on "soap's rising stars". He started by praising the character of Chloe, writing "Some fans weren't quite sure what to make of feisty Chloe when she first joined Ramsay Street this year, but we've quickly warmed to the latest member of the Brennan family. Chloe's character is proving to be entertaining and pretty unpredictable, but we've also seen plenty of vulnerability too, in particular when she was diagnosed with Huntington's disease." Kilkelly hoped Pengilly would be staying with the serial for a long time, and predicted that her best storylines had yet to air.

Of Chloe and Elly's relationship, Katie Baillie of the British newspaper Metro observed: "There's been so much sexual chemistry between Elly Conway (Jodi Anasta) and Chloe Brennan (April Rose Pengilly that it's seemed like a sure thing they might get together." The storyline has proved popular with viewers, who have given the characters the portmanteau "Chelly" on social media. In 2021, Chloe was placed sixth in a poll ran via soap fansite "Back To The Bay", which asked readers to determine the top ten most popular Neighbours characters. In a 2022 feature profiling the "top 12 iconic Neighbours characters", critic Sheena McGinley of the Irish Independent placed Chloe as the second most iconic. She praised Chloe's bisexuality and coupled with Chloe's terminal illness, the issues were a huge responsibility for Pengilly. McGinley also praised Chloe's stories, adding "when it comes to a full story arc - from escort to businesswoman, and everything in between - Chloe's the full package."
