= Kingswood (band) =

Australian alternative rock group

- Origin: Melbourne, Victoria, Australia
- Genre: Alternative rock
- Years active: 2007–present
- Labels: Dew Process (2013–2020); ABC Music (2025–present)
- Members: Fergus Linacre; Alex Laska; Braiden Michetti; Josh Koop
- Past members: Jeremy "Mango" Hunter; Justin Debrincat
- Website: http://www.kingswoodband.com/

Kingswood is an Australian alternative rock group, formed in 2007 in Melbourne by Fergus Linacre, Alex Laska, Jeremy "Mango" Hunter, and Justin Debrincat. In July 2025, they signed with ABC Music. The group has released eight studio albums to date.

== History ==
=== 2007–2013: Formation and EPs ===
Kingswood formed in 2007 by Fergus Linacre (lead vocals), Alex Laska (lead guitar), Jeremy "Mango" Hunter (bass) and Justin Debrincat (drums) having met at Melbourne Grammar School. In 2010, the group released a self-titled EP, limited to 500 copies on CD. Their debut single "Yeah Go Die" was released in February 2011 and received airplay on Triple J. "Medusa" was released in June 2012, followed by "She's My Baby"/"Wolf" in October 2012. "Ohio" was released in April 2013, alongside the deluxe re-release of the EP Change of Heart.

=== 2013–2019: Dew Process ===
In December 2013, The group announced it had signed with Dew Process and confirmed the release of their debut album for February 2014. Microscopic Wars was recorded at Blackbird Studio, Nashville with three-time Grammy Award-winning producer/sound engineer Vance Powell (Consolers of the Lonely – The Raconteurs, Blunderbuss – Jack White). It debuted at number six on the ARIA Albums Chart in February 2014. At the ARIA Music Awards of 2014, the album was nominated for Best Rock Album In August 2014, the group released "ICFTYDLM" (I Can Feel That You Don't Love Me") to positive reviews.>

In 2016, the band spent time in Nashville USA, recording their second album, and in October 2016, released "Creepin'", the album's lead single. Principal songwriter Alex Laska said "Creepin' is a song about the darker and more lustful parts of one's mind, when longing for an object or person of desire. The idea being an attempt at reconciliation of the thought itself when the reality is an insatiable quest that ultimately transforms the protagonist entirely from something quite innocent and pure into a more sinister, powerful self through recognition of this transformation".

In March 2017, Kingswood released their second album After Hours, Close to Dawn, which peaked at number 10 on the ARIA Charts. The album spawned two further singles, "Golden" and "Atmosphere".

In September 2018, the group released the single "Messed It Up", which was described by AIRIT as "all sinewy synth-soul compulsion with a restless rock undertow".

In 2019, "Say You Remember" and "You Make It So Easy" were released as the lead singles from their third studio album, Juveniles, followed by "Bittersweet" in January 2020. Juveniles was released in March 2020 and peaked at number 14 on the ARIA Charts.

=== 2023–present: Kingswood Band and Midnight Mavericks ===
Kingswood's sixth studio album, Home, was released on 24 February 2023. This was followed in November with The Tale of G.C. Townes.

On 15 August 2025, the group released "Lovin' a Girl", the lead single from their forthcoming album and first with ABC Music. Their eighth studio album Midnight Mavericks was released on 22 May 2026.

== Discography ==
=== Studio albums ===
List of albums, with selected chart positions
Title	Album details	Peak chart positions
Title	Album details	AUS
Microscopic Wars	Released: 22 August 2014; Label: Dew Process (DEW9000690); Format: CD, LP, digital download	6
After Hours, Close to Dawn	Released: March 2017; Label: Dew Process (DEW9000914); Format: CD, LP, digital download	10
Juveniles	Released: 13 March 2020; Label: Dew Process (DEW9001213); Format: CD, LP, digital download	14
Reveries	Released: 23 October 2020; Label: Kingswood, Best & Fairest (BAF046); Format: CD, digital download	—
A Kingswood Christmas	Released: 27 November 2020; Label: Kingswood, Best & Fairest (BAF047); Format: CD, digital download	—
Home	Released: 24 February 2023; Label: Kingswood (KINGSWOOD001CD); Format: CD, LP, digital download	15
The Tale of G.C. Townes	Released: 3 November 2023; Label: Kingswood, Best & Fairest; Format: digital download, streaming	—
Midnight Mavericks	Released: 22 May 2026; Label: ABC Music (ABCC0042); Format: CD, digital download, streaming	23

=== Extended plays ===
List of extended plays
Title	EP details
Kingswood	Released: 2010; Label: Kingswood; Format: CD; Limited to 500 copies
Quiesce	Released: March 2012; Label: Kingswood (KWDCD004); Format: CD, digital download
Change of Heart	Released: May 2012; Label: Kingswood (KWDCD006); Format: CD, digital download

=== Certified singles ===
List of certified singles as lead artist, with certifications, and album details
Title	Year	Certification	Album
"Creepin'"	2016	ARIA: Gold	After Hours, Close to Dawn
"Golden"	2017	ARIA: Platinum	After Hours, Close to Dawn

== Awards and nominations ==
=== AIR Label Music Awards ===
The Australian Independent Record Awards (commonly known informally as AIR Awards) is an annual awards night to recognise, promote and celebrate the success of Australia's Independent Music sector.

Year	Nominee / work	Award	Result
2013	Change of Heart	Best Independent Hard Rock, Heavy or Punk Album	Nominated

=== APRA Music Awards ===
The annual APRA Awards (Australia) are presented by the Australasian Performing Right Association. Kingswood have received three nominations.

Year	Nominee / work	Award	Result
2015	"Sucker Punch"	Rock Work of the Year	Nominated
2016	"Micro Wars"	Rock Work of the Year	Nominated
2018	"Creepin'"	Rock Work of the Year	Nominated

=== ARIA Music Awards ===
The ARIA Music Awards are a set of annual ceremonies presented by Australian Recording Industry Association (ARIA), which recognise excellence, innovation, and achievement across all genres of the music of Australia. They commenced in 1987. Kingswood have received one nomination.

Year	Nominee / work	Award	Result	Ref.
2014	Microscopic Wars	Best Rock Album	Nominated	

=== Country Music Awards of Australia ===
The Country Music Awards of Australia is an annual awards night held in January during the Tamworth Country Music Festival. Celebrating recording excellence in the Australian country music industry. They commenced in 1973.

Year	Nominee / work	Award	Result	Ref.
2025	The Tale of G.C.Townes	Album of the Year	Nominated	
2025	The Tale of G.C.Townes	Traditional Country Album of the Year	Nominated	
2025	"Jet"	Instrumental of the Year	Nominated	
2025	"Tell Me a Story"	Bluegrass Recording of the Year Artist	Nominated	
2027	Kingswood	Group or Duo of the Year	Pending	
2027	Midnight Mavericks	Alt. Country / Americana Album of the Year	Pending	
2027	Midnight Mavericks	Album of the Year	Pending	

=== J Award ===
The J Awards are an annual series of Australian music awards that were established by the Australian Broadcasting Corporation's youth-focused radio station Triple J. They commenced in 2005.

Year	Nominee / work	Award	Result
2012	themselves	Unearthed Artist of the Year	Nominated
2013	"Ohio"	Australian Video of the Year	Nominated
