= Melbourne Fashion Festival =

The Melbourne Fashion Festival, officially PayPal Melbourne Fashion Festival, is Australia's largest consumer fashion event, held annually in Melbourne, Victoria. Established in 1996, the festival showcases Australian fashion designers through a programme of runway shows, exhibitions, and associated events. It operates as a not-for-profit organisation and has previously been sponsored by brands including L'Oréal and Virgin Australia, with PayPal currently holding naming rights.

== History ==
The festival was founded in 1996 with the aim of inviting a public audience to participate in fashion culture. It has since evolved into a significant event on Melbourne's cultural calendar, celebrating Australian fashion and design.

== Format and programming ==
The festival follows a consumer-focused model, often featuring a "see now, buy now" format that allows attendees to purchase garments shown on the runway immediately. The event also includes fashion-related seminars, industry workshops, musical performances, and public exhibitions. It forms part of the Victorian Major Events calendar and is promoted as a driver of tourism and economic activity within the state. According to event organisers, more than 15% of public ticket sales originate from outside Victoria.

The organisation has implemented a ban on the use of animal fur at its events. The festival is typically held in mid-to-late March each year.

== Controversy ==
In 2023, the festival attracted criticism after a runway show featured garments printed with the Arabic phrase "Allah walk with me." The clothing, designed by the label Not A Man's Dream, included sheer fabrics, which led to condemnation from the Australian National Imams Council. The council considered the display disrespectful to Islamic beliefs due to the use of religious text on transparent clothing.

In response, the festival issued an apology and removed the designer from the programme, acknowledging the concerns raised and the offence caused.

== Governance ==
The festival operates as a not-for-profit organisation, with a board of directors overseeing its activities. It has been led by various industry professionals over the years. In 2003, Robert Buckingham served as the founding creative director of the festival, during which he invited international experts to address the Australian fashion industry at a business seminar.

== See also ==
- Australian Fashion Week
