= Sheila Canning =

Fictional character from the soap opera Neighbours

- Neighbours character
- Portrayed by: Colette Mann
- Duration: 2012–2022
- First appearance: 3 May 2012
- Last appearance: 16 February 2022
- Introduced by: Richard Jasek and Susan Bower
- Spin-off appearances: Summer Stories (2016); Neighbours vs Time Travel (2017); SheilaTV (2018); Sheila & Clive (2019)
In-universe information
- Occupation: Barmaid; Legal secretary; Executive bar manager
- Husband: Frank Canning
- Sons: Gary Canning; Frank Canning Jr.
- Daughters: Naomi Canning
- Grandsons: Kyle Canning; Dane Canning; Harley Canning; Levi Canning
- Granddaughters: Xanthe Canning; Kylie Canning

Sheila Canning is a fictional character from the Australian soap opera Neighbours, played by Colette Mann. The character was teased by the show's executive producer Richard Jasek in January 2012. The following month Mann's casting was announced. She had previously appeared in the soap in 1995 and 1996, temporarily taking over the role of Cheryl Stark for eight weeks. Mann made her debut screen appearance as Sheila during the episode broadcast on 3 May 2012. After taking a brief break to appear in a play, Mann was promoted to the regular cast. Sheila was created as a "warmer" version of 1980s character Nell Mangel (Vivean Gray) and a resident stickybeak.

Sheila was introduced as the grandmother of established character Kyle Canning (Chris Milligan). She is a widow and the matriarch of the Canning family. She often meddles in her family's business, believing she knows what is best for them. Mann described Sheila as being "pushy, slightly controlling – and a little bit of a gossip", while reporters called her "opinionated" and "over-affectionate". Sheila comes to Erinsborough to visit Kyle and she instantly clashes with his then girlfriend Jade Mitchell (Gemma Pranita). She also develops a comedic rivalry with Lou Carpenter (Tom Oliver). Sheila has had romantic relationships with Walter Mitchell (Chris Haywood), Russell Brennan (Russell Kiefel) and Clive Gibbons (Geoff Paine). Further exploration of the character's background began with the introductions of her children Naomi Canning (Morgana O'Reilly) and Gary Canning (Damien Richardson) in 2014. The character has been well-received by television critics. In February 2022, Mann confirmed that she had departed the show. Her final scenes aired on 16 February in Australia, with Sheila's exit taking place off-screen in subsequent episodes.

== Casting ==
During a January 2012 interview with a TV Week writer, Neighbours executive producer Richard Jasek commented that viewers would see more of Kyle Canning's (Chris Milligan) family, starting with the introduction of his grandmother later in the year. Jasek said the character would be quite big in all senses. On 8 February 2012, it was announced Colette Mann had rejoined the cast of Neighbours as Sheila Canning. Mann previously appeared in the show in 1995 and 1996, when she temporarily took over the role of Cheryl Stark for eight weeks when Caroline Gillmer fell ill. She was one of three actresses who auditioned for the part. Mann stated that she was looking forward to working with Milligan, saying "Chris is a lovely boy, however like my sons, he'll wonder what has hit him after working with me for a few weeks." Mann made her screen debut as Sheila on 3 May 2012.

Sheila initially started out as a guest character, but eventually become a member of the regular cast. Mann took a short break from Neighbours in July 2012 to appear in a play. Mann said that plans for her to appear in the play had been made before she took on the role of Sheila. Milligan confirmed that Mann had returned to filming in September 2012. In March 2013, Mann commented that she was enjoying working on Neighbours and things had become more natural now that there was a familiarity with Sheila. When asked if she had put her own stamp on Sheila, Mann explained that playing a regular character meant that she got to know them better than anyone and she had subconsciously added layers. She added that the producers and directors allowed her "great leeway" with her lines. In October 2013, Susan Hill from the Daily Star reported that Mann had signed a new contract keeping her with Neighbours for another year.

== Development ==
=== Characterisation ===
Mann confirmed that the original idea for Sheila was to be "a warmer Mrs Mangel" and the show's resident "nosy stickybeak". Before her introduction, Sheila was described by a Herald Sun reporter as being "opinionated" and someone who would ruffle feathers. Susan Hill from the Daily Star commented that Sheila was "over-affectionate", but "lovable". In her newspaper column, Mann called Sheila "a pushy, slightly controlling – and a little bit of a gossip – grandmother." She wrote that she had to do "a great deal of research" as the character is so far removed from her own personality. Mann later told TV Week's Andrew Mercado that Sheila's arrival would be like "a galleon in full sail" and that she loved injecting some humour into the show. Mann later explained that she brought in for her comedic abilities, and that she had based some aspects of Sheila's personality on her own mother. A writer for the show's official website revealed that Sheila was a widow who often meddled in her family's business. They explained "If she knows what's best for her kids and grandkids – and she always does – she'll do whatever it takes to achieve it, even if that means being underhanded."

Mann told an Inside Soap writer that Sheila was the matriarch of the Canning family, who loved her grandson Kyle "very much". The actress suspected that Kyle was actually Sheila's favourite. Sheila likes to know what is happening to everyone else around her and is more than willing to offer her advice if it is asked for. The writer stated that while Sheila is not intellectual, she does have good instincts and "a sharp sense of humour". However, she is quick to make judgements about other people and has no time for political correctness. In March 2013, Mann called Sheila "a tough old bird" and quipped that she has some endearing characteristics, but they can be harder to find. The actress also branded the character "a first-class meddler" and stated that she often speaks her mind, which is one of the only things Mann has in common with her.

=== Interfering in Kyle's love life ===
After deciding to visit her grandson Kyle, Sheila turns up unannounced on his doorstep and is "thrilled" to see him. Mann thought that Sheila was getting sick of waiting for Kyle to visit her in Frankston, so she came to him instead. Sheila was also interested in meeting Kyle's girlfriend, Jade Mitchell (Gemma Pranita). Mann said that Sheila had already heard a few things about Jade and had made her mind up about her already; she was the wrong girl for her grandson. While looking around Kyle's handyman business, Sheila meets Kate Ramsay (Ashleigh Brewer) and mistakes her for Jade. Impressed by Kate's manners and politeness, Sheila is then left to wonder whether Kate should be "in her precious grandson's life" instead. When Sheila finally meets Jade, she is underwhelmed by her brashness and does not hold back her opinion towards her.

Jade becomes frustrated and her attitude convinces Sheila that the conservative Kate is really the one for Kyle. A show spokesperson commented "Sheila adores Kyle and would do absolutely anything for him, which rubs Jade up the wrong way. Everyone can expect the sparks to fly between the two women in his life. It's going to be a very tricky time for Kyle as he tries to please them both." Sheila informs Kyle that Jade is not marriage material and that Kate would be better for him. Sheila decides to meddle in Kyle's love life, but Mann believed that it was out of love as Sheila just wanted Kyle to be happy. Although Sheila does not get on with Jade, she decides to stay around to keep an eye on Kyle.

When Kyle starts spending time with Georgia Brooks (Saskia Hampele), Sheila becomes concerned that Georgia is trying to seduce him, even though she has a boyfriend. When asked whether Sheila would warm to Georgia, Mann replied that everyone "goes through a screening process with Sheila", but because family means a lot to her, her grandson's welfare always comes first. She gives anyone who becomes close to him a hard time for a while. After accusing Georgia of leading Kyle on, Sheila encourages her grandson to pursue a relationship with Jana Noviac (Kyrie Capri). Sheila also clashes with Georgia's aunt, Angie Rebecchi (Lesley Baker), who has noticed the sexual tension between Georgia and Kyle too. The two women end up defending their families.

=== Relationships ===
==== Lou Carpenter ====
Sheila developed a rivalry with Lou Carpenter (Tom Oliver), but when questioned about a potential romance between the characters, Mann thought it would be best if they stayed "at each other's throats". She said that the rivalry would provide the writers with more scope in terms of humorous storylines for the pair. Mann added that she and Oliver had already had a romance when she filled in as Cheryl Stark, who was Lou's partner. Later episodes hinted at a spark between Sheila and Lou. Jasek was also asked if he would like them to embark on a romance and explained that it was an interesting idea and one that was still being discussed. He continued "We have certainly thought of putting them together – it's an obvious direction to go in – however I think the best humour comes from their constant sparring with each other and some of their stories coming up are just hilarious." In October 2013, Mann reiterated that Sheila and Lou should not be put together, believing that their relationship was better when they were fighting.

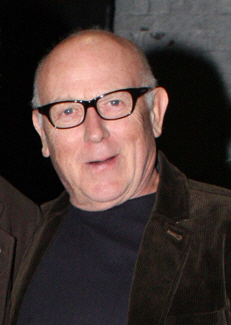
Chris Haywood played Walter Mitchell, a love interest for Sheila.

==== Walter Mitchell ====
In March 2013, Mann teased the arrival of a potential love interest for Sheila, saying "her attention is somewhat diverted by a visitor to Erinsborough." In June 2013, Walter Mitchell (Chris Haywood) was introduced to the show and Digital Spy's Daniel Kilkelly reported that one of the local Ramsay Street residents would become "smitten" with him. Shortly after meeting Sheila, Walter "flirts outrageously" with her, which she reciprocates. Walter later embarks on a plan to steal Sheila's personal identification number (PIN), so he can access her bank account. Sheila is unaware of his intentions as she is charmed by Walter's "romantic overtures" towards her. Walter later packs his bags and departs Erinsborough, leaving his niece Sonya Rebecchi (Eve Morey) and Sheila devastated. Mann said she enjoyed having Walter in Sheila's life and called him "a bit of a rotter", commenting that no one can be happy for too long in Erinsborough. Mann also said that a woman does not need a man to be happy and she believed Sheila was happy on her own.

==== Russell Brennan ====
Two years later, a new love interest for Sheila was introduced in the form of Russell Brennan (Russell Kiefel), the father of the Brennan brothers. As their romance progresses, Kyle worries that his grandmother will get hurt, while Tyler Brennan (Travis Burns) is not happy that his father is planning to stay around for longer. Sheila later suggests that Russell buys the local garage Fitzgerald Motors and offers to lend him the money he needs, causing concern from her family and friends. When Sheila sees Angie Rebecchi talking to Russell, she becomes jealous of their friendship. Angie decides to deliberately flirt with Russell to wind Sheila up. Russell later walks in on the two women "scrapping like teenagers". Baker said the scenes were "great fun" to film, and she and Mann decided to play them up a little as they knew each other well. It soon emerges that Russell had physically abused Tyler when he was younger. Russell apologises, but his sons asks him to return to Port Lincoln. Of Sheila's reaction, Mann explained, "Russell was the first man she'd been interested in since her husband died, so it was part of her way of starting again. But, she's not prepared to put up with that sort of behaviour." Sheila tells Russell that he needs to work on his issues and watches on as his taxi leaves the street.

==== Clive Gibbons ====
Sheila embarks on a romance with Clive Gibbons (Geoff Paine) in 2017. Mann told Johnathon Hughes of the Radio Times that she was "excited" upon learning that Sheila would date Clive. Clive and Sheila initially clash when he wrongly accuses Xanthe of stealing hospital medication. Sheila later learns that he is attracted to her because she is "fiery" and "a bit barmy". When they meet each other again, Clive asks if they can start over and she agrees to go out on a date with him. Clive tells Sheila that he will take her to an art gallery, but she feels that she will be out of her depth and asks Paul Robinson for his help. Mann told Hughes, "Sheila is already nervous about the date because she was married to the same man for 25 years, but it was a very comfortable relationship with not much spark. This is different. Clive is chief operating officer at the hospital, she thinks he's above her intellectually and is a bit intimidated." Hughes thought Clive and Sheila were opposites, but Mann thought that this was the reason why their relationship could work. Sheila relationship with Clive is short lived, ending when she receives a letter from Russell, who tells her he is ill and wants to reconcile with her. The actress enjoyed working with Paine during the storyline, as she had known him for a number of years and they once acted in a play together. Mann also confirmed that series producer Jason Herbison had promised to reintroduce Clive into Sheila's life "with a big bang".

The pair ensue in a long-distance relationship from 2018 until 2020. Paine's position in the soap as a semi-regular cast member allowed producers to create a new webisode series, titled Sheila & Clive, a spin-off to help fill viewers in on their relationship when Clive was not on screens. In September 2020, it was announced that Sheila and Clive's relationship would be coming to an end as Clive breaks up with Sheila after she tries to hide Levi Canning's (Richie Morris) epilepsy test results. Clive begins a secret relationship with Jane Harris (Annie Jones), and keeps it secret from Sheila in order to not hurt her feelings. Sheila "gets her hopes up" when Clive invites her over for dinner, being "excited at the prospect of a romantic reunion with Clive", however Clive informs her that "there is no hope for them". Sheila later discovers Clive and Jane's relationship and is left "furious", "devastated" and "angry". Additionally, she refuses to accept and approve of their relationship. Sheila later discovers that Jane used to be in love with Des Clarke (Paul Keane), so Sheila contacts Des and "convinces him to come to Erinsborough". Sheila uses Des to reel back Clive by taking him out on a date, however when Des sees Jane on a date with Clive, they all realise what Sheila has been up to and confront her. Des yells at her and she subsequently collapses, landing in hospital and being "fitted" with a pacemaker. Sheila accepts Des' apology and then accepts that her and Clive's relationship is truly over.

Speaking to What's on TV, Mann revealed that she was not happy with the producers' original intent of portraying the storyline humorously. She told the publication, "As a woman who's been through it herself twice in life, I said I don't think it's a funny situation. Believing that you're in love with someone when they're in love with someone else. The producers were fantastic and we didn't change the storyline but we changed the way we played it." Towards the end of the storyline, the opening titles were changed to move Clive from a shot with Sheila to a shot with Jane, which was called "a nice surprise" by Jess Lee of Digital Spy. Mann also hinted that Sheila would continue to be a prominent character in another upcoming storyline, teasing, "Sheila is very busy with other things in her family and I love working with the young people, which I'm doing a lot of at the moment."

=== Anxiety issues ===
During a story meeting, Mann asked why her character was not given a dramatic storyline and the writers agreed that she should have one. Sheila's storyline was tied up with Chris Pappas's (James Mason) story. When Chris takes some sleeping tablets and leaves the house while sleepwalking, Sheila chases after him dressed only in a nightie, a dressing gown and a pair of Ugg boots. During the chase, Sheila is approached by Derek Blasko (John Jones) in his car and he tries to solicit her, which she dislikes. Sheila initially dismisses the event, but a few days later when she thinks about it, she reacts badly. Because of the restrictive time slot in Australia, Derek was not allowed to be shown approaching or touching Sheila. Mann explained "I said, 'Look, this is all a bit silly. Sheila is a tough old nut so she'd probably just tell him to get lost and keep walking!' There wasn't much we could do about it because of the restrictions, so then we decided that it will come out further in a story, much later on, that this reminded her of a time when a much worse thing happened to her. Back when she was younger and managing the hotels in Frankston, she was attacked by two men in the back car park." Mann said the next layer of the story would play out in a few months time and it would see Sheila suffer flashbacks, which become "really bad". Sheila refuses to talk about it and Mann added that the point they are trying to make is that it is best to talk about things.

=== Family introductions and heart attack ===
In October 2013, Daniel Kilkelly from Digital Spy reported that Sheila's youngest daughter would be introduced, after producers decided to explore Sheila's background further. Sheila's daughter had previously been mentioned on-screen several times before her arrival, with Sheila still restless about an argument that resulted in a large falling out between them. Morgana O'Reilly was cast as Naomi Canning soon afterwards, and began appearing from March. Naomi and Sheila were seen to clash regularly, as fives years prior Sheila had discovered Naomi's affair with a married man and told his wife. Sheila was pleased to see Naomi, but she was suspicious of her sudden urge to see her. Mann said, "Sheila has learned the hard way that there is always an agenda with Naomi. Nothing is ever as it seems." Sheila later believed Naomi was having another affair and accused her of repeating her past mistakes. However, after Naomi threatened to leave, Sheila promised not to interfere in her life anymore and allowed Naomi to move in. Mann said the producers were "starting to bring in her family over the next six months", and added that "hopefully there'll also be... an older male (coming in)", but warned that Sheila does not get on with him either.

The second of Sheila's children to be introduced was her son Gary (Damien Richardson), Kyle's estranged father. Gary appeared for a guest stint from November 2014. Although bonding with Gary again initially, like she had done with Naomi, Sheila later realised he was intent on fleeing Erinsborough, leaving her to pick up the pieces with Kyle. She also discovered he was responsible for a vicious attack, ordered by Paul Robinson (Stefan Dennis). When she failed to stop Gary fleeing, Sheila suffered a massive heart attack on Christmas Day. Naomi found her mother unconscious on the living room floor and immediately called Karl Kennedy for help. Sheila was rushed to the hospital, where her family waited by her bedside for news of her condition. Naomi initially assumed that she was to blame for causing Sheila's heart attack as she had argued with her mother earlier in the day. However, when Gary turned up, he revealed that it was his fault. A "furious" Naomi then told Kyle that the reason Gary walked out on the family was due to his involvement in a robbery.

=== Departure ===
After fans noticed that the Canning family scene in the opening titles was not changed and Mann was not appearing in behind the scenes videos, it was announced on 7 February 2022 that Mann was not currently filming on the serial and would be making a "surprise" exit. Digital Spy's Daniel Kilkelly reported that Sheila leaves for the Los Angeles after learning that Naomi's partner is ill. She later contacts the Cannings to let them know that Naomi's partner has died, so she is staying indefinitely to help her look after his three children. Subsequent scenes see the Cannings talk about the situation, but Sheila's exit takes place off-screen. On 9 February, Mann confirmed her departure from Neighbours by saying "Looks that way" on social media when asked by a fan if she had left permanently, after her final scenes aired in the UK the previous day. Sheila's final on-screen appearance aired on 16 February 2022 in Australia. The character was later removed from the opening credits. In an interview with New Idea, Mann commented that "They didn't want to kill me off and I didn't want to leave Ramsay Street in the taxi … I just sort of disappeared! That was the best way for me to go." Mann also expressed her sadness over the serial's cancellation, but explained that the news was not a surprise to her and she joked, "I like to think it couldn't go on without Sheila Canning, but I don't quite think that is the case." Following Mann's departure, Digital Spy pointed out that Neighbours writers had seemingly distributed Sheila's planned role in subsequent scenes to other characters, including Roxy Willis (Zima Anderson), Terese Willis (Rebekah Elmaloglou) and Ned Willis (Ben Hall). Producers then introduced Wendy Rodwell (Candice Leask) as the new busybody neighbour.

== Storylines ==
Sheila comes to Erinsborough to meet her grandson Kyle's girlfriend, Jade Mitchell, after selling her bar in Frankston. While Kyle is showing Sheila around his business, Sheila meets Kate Ramsay and takes an instant liking towards her. When she finally meets Jade, Sheila is disappointed and tells Kyle that she is not right for him. Sheila believes Kate is a better fit for Kyle and encourages Kate to go after him. Sheila is instantly suspicious of Kyle's business partner, Lou Carpenter. After spotting Lou accepting money from Vera Munro (Marie-Therese Byrne), Sheila tells Vera that Lou has been conning her. Sheila organises a street party for the Queen's Jubilee and she clashes with Paul Robinson. A few weeks later, Sheila returns and discovers that Kyle kissed Kate, causing Jade to end their relationship. After witnessing how unhappy Kyle and Jade are, Sheila tries to help them get back together. She admits to Kyle that she encouraged Kate to go after him and he tells her to go home. A few months later, Sheila comes to collect her youngest grandson, Harley (Justin Holborow) and take him home to his mother. When she sees the state of Number 26, she tells Kyle and his housemates that she is moving in to sort it out. She also gets a job at the local bar.

Sheila and Lou continue to clash, as she does not trust him. Sheila notices that Georgia Brooks has developed feelings for Kyle and warns her off, as she has a boyfriend. They later begin dating. Sheila puts down a deposit for a new apartment at Lassiter's, but when she notices that the council have yet to approve the development, she demands her money back. Sheila finds a garden gnome in the hard rubbish and takes it for her collection. She later finds $10,000 inside it. When Sheila catches Bailey (Calen Mackenzie) and Mason Turner (Taylor Glockner) in her garden, they explain that the money in the gnome belongs to Lou and she gives him the money. Sheila takes Rhiannon Bates (Teressa Liane) under her wing, when she briefly moves into Number 26, and help her change her image and get a job. Lou tries to kiss Sheila, which offends her. Sheila forgives him when Bailey and Mason confesses to winding Lou up about her. Sheila meets Walter Mitchell and is attracted to him. However, he cons her out of money at the bar and takes her bank card. Sheila is devastated when she learns that Walter lied about his identity and stole from her neighbours. Walter apologises, but Sheila makes it clear that she does not want to see him again.

Lou believes Sheila is interested in him, as she was leaving him flirty messages on his blog. However, Bailey admits that he left the messages using Sheila's name and she tells him to sort it out. When a sleep walking Chris leaves the house in the middle of the night, Sheila chases after him. She is accosted by Derek Blasko, who follows her in his car, until she tells him to leave her alone. The incident leaves her shaken. When a man takes her picture, Sheila's paranoia causes her to confront him and break his camera. She is informed by a police officer that man was a photography student and she got in the way of his shot. Sheila is initially charged with wilful damage, until she pays for a new camera and writes a letter of apology. Kate then convinces Sheila to enrol in a self-defence class. Sheila encourages Kyle to propose to Georgia and she throws them a surprise engagement party. Sheila's youngest daughter, Naomi arrives in town and it soon emerges that they have not seen each other in five years, due to Sheila interfering in Naomi's affair with a married man. Sheila offers Naomi a room at Number 26 and Naomi makes it clear that she will not stay if Sheila interferes in her life, and Sheila agrees to back off.

Naomi begins working for Toadfish Rebecchi (Ryan Moloney) and Sheila starts to believe that Naomi has set her sights on another married man. She encourages her daughter to find a boyfriend and supports Naomi when she claims she has a stalker. Naomi later kisses Toadie and Sheila finds it hard to talk to her afterwards. Sheila then tells Naomi that she is to blame for her father's death, as he suffered a fatal heart attack when he learned about her affair. Naomi moves out to Number 24 and Sheila gives her a cheque to leave town. Kyle and Georgia try to get them to make up. Sheila remains angry with Naomi and Kyle's bans her from his upcoming wedding. Naomi eventually tells Kyle and Georgia what happened and makes amends with Sheila. After reading an erotic novel, which Lou claims he wrote, Sheila begins fantasising about him. She later dreams of Paul, after they become locked in The Waterhole's store room together. Sheila joins an online dating site and meets Alan Haywood (Paul Roberts). When Alan admits that he has dating profiles on websites looking for men, Sheila breaks up with him for lying to her. Sheila helps Naomi leave Erinsborough for a while to move on from her feelings for Toadie, and is overjoyed when Kyle and Georgia marry.

Sheila meets with her estranged son, Gary, to give him money, but Kyle sees them and seeks answers as he has not seen his father since he was 8. Sheila admits that Gary did not want contact, but Georgia convinces Gary to rejoin the family. Naomi returns and Sheila helps her with her new business venture, organising carols at the Lassiter's Complex. On Christmas Day, Sheila discovers Gary is responsible for an attack on Ezra Hanley (Steve Nation) for Paul. Paul pays him for the attack on the condition he leaves Erinsborough immediately, but the exchange is witnessed by Sheila and she confronts him, telling him to turn himself into the police. Gary refuses and leaves, so Sheila starts to call the police, but she collapses from a heart attack. Naomi finds her and she is rushed to hospital. When Sheila comes home, she experiences more chest pains, but a check-up reveals it is just indigestion. Sheila and Lou clash again over their businesses, so Lauren Carpenter (Kate Kendall) makes them work together for the Erinsborough Festival. Sheila discovers that Georgia is still taking the pill after she and Kyle agreed to try for a baby, forcing Georgia to admit to Kyle that she is not ready.

Naomi asks Sheila and Susan Kennedy (Jackie Woodburne) to act as judges for the Erinsborough Festival's baking competition, but they soon decide to enter and a rivalry begins. They compete against Janelle Timmins (Nell Feeney), but all three lose out to Karl Kennedy (Alan Fletcher) after their entries are ruined. Sheila worries about Naomi's closeness with Paul, and is disappointed when Naomi ends her relationship with Mark Brennan (Scott McGregor). Ezra Hanley becomes the acquisitions manager for Lassiter's and clashes with Sheila. He demotes her and hires Nate Kinski (Meyne Wyatt) as the new bar manager. After Sheila finds Ezra's plans for redeveloping The Waterhole, she and Nate team up to get on Ezra's good side and learn more about the plans. After Nate is verbally attacked by homophobic customer Alistair Hall (Nick Cain), Sheila intervenes and sends Alistair away. Her rant is caught on camera and uploaded to the internet. Alistair attempts to sue Sheila for defamation, but later backs down when the full clip, featuring his homophobic words towards Nate, is published.

Jimmy Williams (Darcy Tadich) blackmails Sheila into giving him treats after he finds a letter detailing her feelings for Paul. Under pressure, Sheila shakes Jimmy. She later apologises to him after revealing the blackmail. Sheila discovers Terese has been taking wine from The Waterhole and suspects she has a drinking problem. Sheila begins a relationship with Russell Brennan and offers to lend him money to buy the local garage. Sheila reveals that the money was given to her by Gary, and is the proceeds of crime. She decides to hand the money to the police. Sheila fights with Angie Rebecchi when she thinks that Angie is flirting with Russell. After learning that Russell abused his son Tyler, Sheila ends their relationship and tells Russell to seek professional help. Sheila is caught up in the Erinsborough High fire and leaves a paralysed Toadie trapped in the rubble to save herself. In a bid to ease her guilt, Sheila does Sonya and Toadie's laundry. Karl urges her not to push herself as her blood pressure is high, but she later faints after carrying furniture. Sheila explains to Karl how she left Toadie, but he assures her that she would not have been able to save Toadie on her own. Sheila suffers another anxiety attack and accidentally strikes Ben Kirk (Felix Mallard) with her car. She then tells Toadie the truth about the night of the fire and he forgives her.

After learning Paul is selling Number 26, Sheila decides to buy it herself. She rents a room out via Airbnb to raise money for a loan. Gary's daughter Xanthe Canning (Lilly Van der Meer) arrives, and Sheila decides to take care of her after learning her mother is missing. Kyle reunites with Georgia and leaves. When Xanthe is bullied by Alison Gore (Madeleine Andreopoulos), Sheila confronts Alison and slaps her. Facing a charge of assault, Sheila attempts a mediation session with Alison's mother, but it ends badly. She later receives a fine from the magistrate. Sheila gives support and advice to Xanthe when she suffers from low confidence in herself and her body image. Gary is released from prison and moves in. He confronts Sheila about everything Xanthe has gone through and what she has been keeping from him. Sheila later encourages Gary to date Terese. Kyle returns to see his family, and Amy decides to move out, but Sheila, Xanthe and Gary encourage her to stay. The Cannings and Amy appear on Family Feud, where Sheila learns Gary has been in a secret relationship with Terese. Xanthe's mother Brooke Butler (Fifi Box) visits her daughter and Sheila doubts she is being honest with her. Brooke scams the Cannings' friends and neighbours by selling faux-jewellery, leading to a feud with the Kennedys.

Sheila feels threatened by Terese's influence over Gary and Xanthe, and makes a drunken phone call to Brooke, who returns to Erinsborough to make amends. However, Sheila costs Brooke a job at the hospital when she tells the new chief operations officer Clive Gibbons about Brooke's past. Sheila later asks Terese to give Brooke a job at Lassiters Day Spa. Clive asks Sheila on a date, but she cancels it when he and Karl accuse Xanthe of stealing medication from the hospital. Sheila meets Clive while she is looking for Xanthe and they agree to start again. Clive decides to take Sheila to an art gallery, and she asks Paul for help. Clive and Sheila admit that neither of them know much about art and their date goes well. Sheila receives a letter from Russell in which he asks for her forgiveness. Sheila competes with Karl to become the head of the Liveability Committee, and Sheila wins after blackmailing Karl. She meets Russell's former wife Fay Brennan (Zoe Bertram) and she and the Brennans learn that Russell is ill. Sheila tells Clive that she needs to see Russell, as she needs closure. Before Sheila and Brennans leave for Port Lincoln, they learn Russell has died. Sheila asks Karl to take over the leadership of the Liveability Committee while she deals with her grief. Fay later admits to Sheila that Russell was not the father of one of her sons, and Sheila tells them when they return from Russell's funeral.

Sheila meets Tyler's biological father Hamish Roche (Sean Taylor) and he seduces her. She later admits to her friend Dipi Rebecchi (Sharon Johal) that she experienced her first orgasm with him. Weeks later, Sheila learns that Hamish was also in a relationship with Louise McLeod (Maria Theodorakis). Hamish's body is found in the Cannings' spa and Sheila becomes one of several suspects. Gary asks Paul to help with his and Sheila alibis. Sheila admits that she thought Gary had killed Hamish, while Gary thought she had killed him. Sheila explains that she asked Hamish to meet her at Number 26, but she was too upset to face him and left the house, while he was in the backyard. Sheila asks Clive if they can try again, but he turns her down. Sheila is asked to perform in the Erinsborough variety show and she writes a piece about her life, but skips over her high school days. She admits to Susan and Dipi that she was bullied by her former friend Joanne Schwartz (Val Lehman). They fell out over a mistake with some Daddy Cool tickets. Xanthe contacts Joanne, who agrees to meet with Sheila. Their reunion does not go well and when Joanne reminds Sheila of the last time she performed on stage, in which she forgot her lines and vomited over an actor, Sheila briefly pulls out of the variety show. Joanne laughs when Sheila causes feedback from the microphone, causing Sheila to leave the stage. She is convinced to return and receives a round of applause for her performance. Joanne admits that she was jealous of Sheila and that she was supposed to buy the Daddy Cool tickets. Sheila suggests that they go and see Ross Wilson in concert together.

Sheila asks Clive if he is willing to give their relationship another chance, while offering to help publicise his plan to expand the hospital. Sheila enrols in biology classes at night school, as does Shane Rebecchi (Nicholas Coghlan), which Clive is asked to teach. Sheila accuses Shane of cheating on a test and feels Clive is bullying her. She leaves the class, but later returns to apologise. Sheila and Clive sort out their differences and he invites her out to dinner. Sheila later hires Shane as a barman at The Waterhole. Shane and Gary notice Sheila is suffering some memory lapses, and she worries that she is developing Alzheimer's disease. Clive arranges for Ross Wilson to sing for Sheila, but when she is invited to sing with him on stage, she cannot remember the words to the song and she tells Clive about her fears. He books her in for some tests and discovers that her statin-based heart medication is causing the memory loss, so it is changed as a result. Sheila fails a compliance training course, and when Paul learns she has been selling Gary's deserts from The Flametree Retreat, he fires her. Sheila and Fay Brennan agree to look out for jobs for one another, but they fall out when Fay accepts the managerial position at The Waterhole. Toadie later hires Sheila as his legal secretary. After Fay leaves for Adelaide, Toadie persuades Terese and Leo Tanaka (Tim Kano) to rehire Sheila, as she is not happy working for him.

After Gary is murdered by Finn Kelly (Rob Mills), who also previously tried to run Xanthe over in a car, Sheila begins struggling. Her behaviour becomes odd and she falls into a state of depression. A pigeon begins hanging around Sheila's backyard and Sheila believes it is her son, Gary, in a reincarnated form, as Gary used to be the owner of a flock of racing pigeons. Sheila develops an emotional connection to the bird, which leads her family and friends in concern of her. Gary the pigeon goes missing, causing Sheila to fall into a state of panic. She frantically searches around her house and town to find the pigeon, until she eventually finds him unresponsive in Susan and Karl's backyard. Sheila - who had been blaming Susan for the real Gary's death - begins expressing her pain and anger towards Susan again, accusing her of killing Gary the pigeon. Karl checks over the bird again and it flies into the air. Luckily, Gary the pigeon had just suffered a reaction from a plant it had eaten and had become unconscious due to it. Sheila is relieved and becomes more attached to the bird, worrying her family. Kyle finally contacts Naomi and tells her that Sheila is struggling, so Naomi returns to Erinsborough to help her mother out. She locks Sheila and Susan in a room together and tells them that she isn't going to let them out until they sort out their differences. Sheila finally gets some closure after she burns an inaccurate book about Finn that was written by Olivia Bell (Alyce Platt).

Sheila begins receiving odd packages in the mail that were apparently ordered by her. Confused, she begins giving the packages to her friends and neighbours, giving expensive earrings to Susan and hand lotion to Chloe Brennan (April Rose Pengilly). Sheila keeps a pair of shoes for herself and begins wearing them to work at The Waterhole. A lady - who coincidentally is also called Sheila Canning (Shareena Clanton) - approaches Sheila and claims that the shoes she is wearing are hers. The second Sheila accuses Sheila of stealing her mail and giving it away, before revealing her name is also Sheila Canning. Sheila begins getting the gifts of the people she had given them away to and approaches the second Sheila, offering the products back apologetically. The second Sheila finds Sheila a nuisance at first, but the two of them eventually become good friends. Sheila's grandson, Levi Canning (Richie Morris), is planning a road trip with his girlfriend, Bea Nilsson (Bonnie Anderson). Bea confides in the second Sheila about her relationship doubts and the second Sheila tells her to break it off if she has concerns. Bea listens to her advice, which causes Sheila to get mad at the second Sheila. The two Sheilas later make amends, before the second Sheila leaves.

Sheila is opposed to Levi's new polyamorous relationship with Amy Greenwood (Jacinta Stapleton), who is concurrently dating Ned Willis. Sheila begs Levi to break up with Amy and sides with Levi's mother, Evelyn Farlow (Paula Arundell), when she visits Erinsborough. Evelyn reveals that at Canning gatherings, she felt neglected and that Sheila often sided with Levi's stepmother, Jackie, instead of her. Sheila explains that was not the case, but the two continue to bicker for the rest of Evelyn's stay. Sheila is overjoyed when Levi goes on a date with Felicity Higgins (Isabella Giovinazzo) and watches them together, but their relationship does not last. The following year, Sheila walks Gary the pigeon down the aisle at Kyle and Roxy Willis' wedding and, after Levi breaks up with Amy, Sheila successfully attempts to set up him and Freya Wozniak (Phoebe Roberts) on a date. Later, Sheila leaves for Los Angeles after Naomi's boyfriend falls ill. He subsequently dies, leaving Naomi to look after his three children, and Sheila remains to support her daughter. After a number of weeks away, Sheila informs Kyle that she is selling the house and remaining in LA.

== Reception ==
At the 2016 and 2017 Digital Spy Reader Awards, Sheila received nominations for the Funniest Character accolade. Colin Vickery of the Herald Sun was pleased to see Mann in a new role, writing "Colette Mann makes a welcome return to TV drama playing grandmother Sheila Canning. Sheila springs a surprise visit on Kyle (Chris Milligan), but ruffles feathers when she takes an instant dislike to Jade (Gemma Pranita)." An Inside Soap columnist stated "It's been a while since Ramsay Street was home to a good old stickybeak, but that changes when Sheila Canning arrives".

Geoff Shearer from The Courier-Mail commented "Former Prisoner Colette Mann is continuing to delight since joining the series as Kyle's grandmother Sheila late last month." Claire Crick from All About Soap quipped "Sheila doesn't exactly strike us as someone who beats around the bush". A reporter for the Belfast Telegraph called Sheila a "busybody". Dianne Butler, writing for news.com.au, praised the character and actress, saying "That Sheila's a canny old biddy. She's outfoxing Tash, who's pretty wily herself. I'm loving Colette Mann." In June 2013, Butler quipped "Sheila did time on Prisoner so I say what Sheila wants she should get." Melissa Field from TV Week enjoyed Sheila ripping into Alan when she learned his secret, but quipped "unlucky-in-love Sheila can't get a break." During his end-of-year review, Daniel Kilkelly of Digital Spy praised Mann as being one of the better additions to the cast and observed that Sheila "has lightened up the Street with wit, warmth and some memorable one-liners." While reviewing a January 2015 episode, Cameron Adams of the Herald Sun quipped "And how good is it when Sheila announces herself as a 'beloved local colourful identity'. It's funny because it's true." Adams later praised the actress, saying "How good is Colette Mann as Sheila? Very, very good."

When Sheila met Russell, Claire Crick of All About Soap commented "look out for Sheila in full flirtation mode when she gets to know the new arrival...these two are about to hit it off – big time." Jonathan Hughes of the Radio Times branded Sheila "Ramsay Street's resident battleaxe" and a "gobby granny". Adam Beresford of HuffPost placed Sheila at number twenty-three on the "35 greatest Neighbours characters of all time" feature as part of the serial's 35th anniversary. Journalist Adam Beresford described her, stating "this Aussie battler takes no prisoners, is fiercely protective of her family and is also prone to being a bit of sticky beak. We would not mess with Sheila, but she has a good heart and brings a dose of earthy humour to Erinsborough." When discussing Sheila's motherhood, Sarah Ellis of Inside Soap called the character a "bossy mum". A critic for The Advertiser named Sheila a "veteran character". They said Gary's death led to Mann "delivering some of her best scenes in years. Tissues at the ready, people." Ahead of Sheila's off-screen departure, Kilkelly named her the "Ramsay Street matriarch".
