= List of Neighbours characters introduced in 2014 =

Neighbours is an Australian television soap opera. It was first broadcast on 18 March 1985 and airs on digital channel Eleven. The following is a list of characters that appeared in the soap in 2014, by order of first appearance. All characters were introduced by the shows executive producer Richard Jasek, or by his successor Jason Herbison. The 30th season of Neighbours began airing from 6 January 2014. Kathy Carpenter, Sienna Matthews and Naomi Canning made their debut appearances in March. Will Dempier and Daniel Robinson arrived in April, while Ethan Smith began appearing in May. Paige Smith made her debut in June, while Nate Kinski arrived in August. Dakota Davies was introduced in September. October saw the debut of Rain Taylor, while Gary Canning, Ezra Hanley and Erin Rogers arrived in November.

== Kathy Carpenter ==
Kathy Carpenter
- Neighbours character
- Portrayed by: Tina Bursill
- Duration: 2014, 2016
- First appearance: 10 March 2014
- Last appearance: 2 December 2016
- Introduced by: Richard Jasek (2014); Jason Herbison (2016)
In-universe information
- Occupation: Businesswoman
- Husband: Lou Carpenter (backstory)
- Sons: Guy Carpenter
- Daughters: Lauren Carpenter
- Grandsons: Mason Turner; Bailey Turner
- Granddaughters: Paige Smith; Amber Turner

Kathy Carpenter, played by Tina Bursill, made her first screen appearance on 10 March 2014. Bursill's casting was announced on 22 November 2013, while Kathy has previously been mentioned in the series. A Neighbours spokesperson confirmed that Bursill began filming her scenes in early 2014. Kathy is the former wife of established character Lou Carpenter (Tom Oliver). Bursill and Oliver previously worked with each other in the 1970s and Bursill commented "While it has been a long time between takes, it was lovely to work with Tom again and also a lot of new faces." In May 2014, Calen MacKenzie, who plays Kathy's on-screen grandson Bailey, confirmed Bursill had reprised her role as Kathy for a second guest stint. Kathy returned on 18 July 2014. Bursill reprised the role again in 2016, and returned on 4 November 2016.

Kathy comes to Ramsay Street to visit her daughter Lauren (Kate Kendall). Kathy is the only other person who knew Lauren had been pregnant with Brad Willis's (Kip Gamblin) child and she helped her daughter to hide the pregnancy. Executive producer Jason Herbison commented that during her visit, Kathy would deliver news that will rock the Turner and Willis households, setting the stage for "some major fireworks throughout the year." Bursill later said that Kathy would shock Lauren when she reveals her child is alive and added "Kathy had been trying to protect her daughter by concealing the truth." Daniel Kilkelly from Digital Spy also reported that Kathy would clash with Lou.

Lauren calls Kathy to say that she is going to tell her husband, Matt (Josef Brown), and Brad Willis about the baby she gave birth to twenty years ago. Kathy arrives in Erinsborough to see Lauren and instantly clashes with her former husband Lou. Lauren intervenes to say Kathy is staying with them. She then takes her mother to see her coffee shop and they discuss the phone call. Kathy tells Lauren that she should keep quiet about the baby. Kathy's youngest grandson, Bailey (Calen Mackenzie), tries to get to the bottom of his grandparents' issues and sits them both down to talk. With Lauren determined to tell Matt about the baby, Kathy admits that the baby was not stillborn and is still alive. Lauren is devastated by Kathy's revelation. Kathy goes on to explain that the baby was adopted out. Lauren is unable to forgive Kathy and asks her to leave. Kathy stays at Lassiter's Hotel, where she meets Brad's wife, Terese (Rebekah Elmaloglou). Kathy tells Terese that she is stopping Lauren from trying to find her daughter. Kathy then informs Bailey and Amber (Jenna Rosenow) about their half-sister, leading to a confrontation with Lou. He asks Kathy to leave, as she is making things worse. However, Kathy stays and buys Number 32 for Lauren. Lauren accepts Kathy's offer on behalf of the children. She then asks her mother to stay away from her family and Kathy leaves town.

Several months later, Lauren invites Kathy back to Erinsborough for Amber and Bailey. She is surprised when, after reconciling over the phone, Kathy makes a sudden arrival, and tells her to book at a room at Lassiter's. Kathy clashes with Terese and Lauren's employee, Paige Smith (Olympia Valance). When Paige shows an interest in Kathy's homeware business, she apologises for her earlier behaviour and Kathy agrees to mentor her. Paige learns that Kathy has hired a private investigator to search for her granddaughter. Paige asks Kathy to abandon the search for Lauren's sake, but Kathy goes ahead with it. Paige later sees Kathy taking some medication and Kathy tells her she has a heart condition. Kathy's private investigator informs her that her granddaughter has been found in Canberra. Kathy meets with Megan Dennison (Stefanie Jones), but she is not happy when Paige interrupts them. Megan later leaves and sends Kathy a text saying the meeting was a mistake. Kathy becomes suspicious of Paige and starts asking around about her. While they are out driving, Kathy goes through Paige's bag and finds a sketch pad with drawings of the Turners and Willises. Kathy realises Paige is the granddaughter she has been searching for, and she has a heart attack causing her to lose control of the car, which then hits Toadfish Rebecchi (Ryan Moloney). Kathy's scarf becomes caught in the door, strangling her. Paige frees her and Kathy and Toadie are taken to the hospital, where Kathy undergoes surgery. When she wakes up, Kathy tells Matt that Paige is Lauren's daughter. Kathy abandons her plans to open a store in Erinsborough and she decides to return to Queensland.

Kathy returns to Erinsborough ahead of Lauren's wedding. Lou follows shortly after and they are hostile towards one another. Kathy explains to Lauren that she and Lou had sex, but when she woke up, Lou had gone. They later learn that Lou thought Kathy had ordered him to leave, but she was actually talking to the cat. They decide not to get back together and Kathy leaves for Brisbane. She returns for the wedding, where she and Lou realise that they still have feelings for each other. They reconcile and hold a small ceremonial vow renewal. They then leave Erinsborough in Lauren and Brad's wedding camper van.

== Sienna Matthews ==
Sienna Matthews
- Neighbours character
- Portrayed by: Sarah Roberts
- First appearance: 21 March 2014
- Last appearance: 22 May 2014
- Introduced by: Richard Jasek
- Spin-off appearances: Brennan on the Run (2014)

Sienna Matthews, played by Sarah Roberts, made her first screen appearance on 21 March 2014. Roberts previously appeared in Neighbours as Clare Henderson (2010) and Jess Walker (2011), while Sienna first appeared in Brennan on the Run, a series of webisodes that focused on Mark Brennan's (Scott McGregor) time in witness protection. Sienna arrived in town to win Mark back and she immediately confronted his former girlfriend Kate Ramsay (Ashleigh Brewer). Kate assumed Mark has invited Sienna to Ramsay Street because he wanted to get back together with her. However, Brennan told Sienna that he was still in love with Kate and a "furious" Sienna demands that Kate stay away from Mark. When Sienna moved in with Mark, TV Week's Rebecca Lake commented, "After an unwelcome kiss from Sienna, Brennan now realises what we've known since last week. Yep, it's time to kick his crazy ex out!" Another TV Week contributor branded Sienna "loopy", "unstable" and a "psycho".

After arriving in Erinsborough, Sienna breaks into Mark's house, surprising both him and Kate Ramsay. Sienna wants to get back together with Mark, but he rejects her as he is in love with Kate. Sienna confronts Kate and asks her to tell Mark that she does not love him. Sienna then speaks with Mark and tells him about the conversation with Kate. She declares her love for Mark, but he rejects her advances again. Paul Robinson (Stefan Dennis) encourages Sienna to stay and fight for Mark. A couple of weeks later, Sienna breaks into Mark's house again and sees that he has bought an engagement ring for Kate. Sienna tries to tell Mark that Kate does not love him, but Mark reveals that he and Kate are back together. Sienna becomes a suspect in Kate's murder after she is found to have given a false alibi. When Sienna claims she has been fired and kicked out of her house, Mark allows her to stay with him. Sienna helps Mark to go through Kate's things and she kisses him. Mark asks her to leave, but changes his mind when Sienna tells him she has nowhere else to go. Sienna then goes away for a few days to give him space. On her return, Mark confronts Sienna with a threatening note she wrote to Kate before her death. Sienna is questioned by the police, but she maintains that she did not shoot Kate. A taxi driver then comes forward to back up Sienna's alibi. Mark tells Sienna to go back home and she wishes him luck in finding Kate's killer.

== Naomi Canning ==
Naomi Canning, played by Morgana O'Reilly, made her first screen appearance on 25 March 2014. The character was teased in an October 2013 interview by cast member Colette Mann, who plays Naomi's estranged mother Sheila. Mann commented that the actress was in the process of being cast, while on-screen, Sheila revealed that she had a bad relationship with her youngest daughter. O'Reilly's casting was announced on 30 December 2013. She filmed her first scenes the previous month. Of her casting, she stated "When I was offered the role, I reverted back to my teenage self and was jumping and squealing. I was so excited." O'Reilly said Naomi was a lot of fun, but would be hiding some secrets from her mother. Shortly before her arrival, it was confirmed that Naomi would test one of the show's established relationships, after she sets her sights on a married man.

== Will Dempier ==
Will Dempier
- Neighbours character
- Portrayed by: Christian Heath
- Duration: 2014, 2017
- First appearance: 8 April 2014
- Last appearance: 19 May 2017
- Introduced by: Richard Jasek (2014); Jason Herbison (2017)
In-universe information
- Occupation: Nurse

Will Dempier, played by Christian Heath, made his first screen appearance on 8 April 2014. The character and Heath's casting was announced on 7 April 2014. Heath began filming three months prior to his casting announcement. He told the Buckinghamshire Advertiser's Camilla Goodman that he was "ecstatic" when he learned that he had won the part of Will. He landed the role after seeing the casting director at Neighbours just once. Heath did not need to perfect an Australian accent for the part and he explained, "When I initially read the sides, I could see this character as English and created a whole backstory that he was from England. I auditioned in my natural accent and luckily got it, they never asked me to change."

Will was introduced as a love interest for established character Chris Pappas (James Mason). Will is a nurse who works at the local hospital. Chris notices Will during his stay in the hospital, after he is attacked. Digital Spy's Daniel Kilkelly said there would be "an instant spark between Chris and Will when they first meet", which leaves Chris with a tough decision whether to break up with his boyfriend Hudson Walsh (Remy Hii) or not. Heath reprised his role in 2017.

Will fetches a pair of crutches for Chris Pappas when he comes into the hospital with a knee injury. Will is later assigned to care for Chris following surgery. Chris has a reaction to the analgesic and flirts outrageously with Will. The following day, Chris apologises to Will, who laughs it off and then gives Chris his number. Will discovers Chris has a boyfriend and tells him that his boyfriend should be by his side, but Chris tells him it is complicated. Will and Chris arrange to meet up for a drink, but Chris cancels at the last minute. He is later admitted to hospital with a blood clot in his leg and Will helps to prep him for a procedure. Chris apologises for leading Will on and tells him about his boyfriend, Hudson, who is in jail. When Will learns from Georgia Brooks (Saskia Hampele) that Chris and Hudson have broken up, he calls on Chris to see if he wants to talk. However, Chris tells Will that he cannot deal with him right now and shuts the door in his face. Will helps Georgia and Chris plant some trees at the local high school. Chris flirts with Will and later asks him on a date. After some initial cold feet from Chris, he and Will being dating. Will and Chris bring their dogs, Napoleon and Bossy, to meet, but Napoleon bites Bossy's leg, which needs treating by a vet. When Will and Chris later meet up, Will refuses to accept responsibility and apologise, so Chris breaks up with him.

Three years later, Will flirts with David Tanaka (Takaya Honda), while David is a patient at the hospital. David and Will share a coffee, but Will is later hostile towards David and reveals that someone has reported him for acting inappropriately with a patient, so he has been placed on night shifts. Will blames David, but Paul Robinson (Stefan Dennis) later admits that he made the complaint. David invites Will out for a drink, and explains that he has only just come out and is nervous. Will walks David home and they kiss. Aaron Brennan (Matt Wilson) overhears Will talking on the phone about how inexperienced David is, and Aaron warns him to stay away from David.

== Daniel Robinson ==
Daniel Robinson, played by Tim Phillipps, made his first screen appearance on 29 April 2014. Daniel has been referred to during several episodes, but had not been seen on-screen before. The character's introduction was confirmed on 2 December 2013. The casting department held auditions for the role and producers stated that Daniel would need to resemble his on-screen parents Scott (Jason Donovan) and Charlene Robinson (Kylie Minogue). On 20 April 2014, a reporter for The Australian confirmed Phillipps had been cast in the role. Daniel comes to Erinsborough to see where his parents met and fell in love. He also catches up with his uncle Paul Robinson (Stefan Dennis). Phillipps described his character as "your happy-go-lucky, hippie-at-heart nature boy" and stated that Daniel would not arrive with any secrets or baggage. While a reporter for The Australian said he would clash with Paul and find romance on Ramsay Street.

== Ethan Smith ==
Ethan Smith
- Neighbours character
- Portrayed by: Matthew Little
- First appearance: 27 May 2014
- Last appearance: 18 July 2014
- Introduced by: Jason Herbison
In-universe information
- Father: John Smith
- Mother: Mary Smith
- Sisters: Paige Smith (adoptive)

Ethan Smith, played by Matthew Little, made his first screen appearance on 27 May 2014. The character and Little's casting was announced on 6 May 2014. Before Little filmed his guest stint with the show, he asked his brother-in-law, actor Dan Ewing, for advice. Little commented "Dan was great and obviously knows the pace you work at on a weekly drama. I had so much fun filming, and everyone was awesome to me and really made me feel welcome." Ethan was billed as being "mysterious" and having a connection to one of the show's regular characters. Ethan will try to keep the connection a secret, but he also finds time for romance.

Ethan meets Brad Willis (Kip Gamblin) when he comes looking for his daughter, who was adopted. Ethan listens to Brad's story and then tells him that he must have got the wrong Smiths, as he was an only child. Brad leaves his business card with Ethan and when he has gone, Ethan makes a phone call to his sister Paige (Olympia Valance), telling her that her biological parents have tracked her down. After Paige goes to Erinsborough to see her parents, she calls Ethan to inform him of her progress. Ethan comes to Erinsborough as he is worried about Paige. Paige tells her brother about her family and Ethan encourages her to come clean.

Ethan meets Imogen Willis (Ariel Kaplan) and is attracted to her, but Paige warns him off. Ethan flirts with Imogen at a party and she kisses him. They exchange numbers and Imogen later skips school to meet up with Ethan, causing her to lose her school captaincy. Brad comes looking for Ethan and he hides from him. Ethan tries again to get Paige to tell her family the truth about her identity. However, Paige urges him to go home as his presence is risking her secret. Ethan says goodbye to Imogen, before he leaves. A few weeks later, Ethan returns to Erinsborough when Paige begins investigating Kathy Carpenter (Tina Bursill), Lauren's mother. Seeing that she is becoming obsessive, Ethan encourages her to come and live with him in Ibiza for a year to consider her options. She declines, and he leaves for Ibiza.

== Paige Smith ==
Paige Smith (previously Novak), played by Olympia Valance, made her first screen appearance on 2 June 2014. The character and casting was announced on 9 March 2014. Paige marks Valance's first acting role and she won the part after a lengthy audition process, which included multiple call-backs. Valance described her character as being "cool and sexy and a bit edgy". She thought viewers would love Paige, especially as she is not mean. Series producer Jason Herbison thought Valance was "the perfect fit for Paige" and called the character "fiery". Paige was revealed to be the daughter of Lauren Carpenter (Kate Kendall) and Brad Willis (Kip Gamblin). When Paige learned that her biological parents were looking for her, her curiosity was piqued and she decided to go to Erinsborough to learn more about them. Paige initially decided to keep her identity a secret.

== Nate Kinski ==
Nate Kinski, played by Meyne Wyatt, made his first screen appearance on 18 August 2014. The character and Wyatt's casting was announced on 20 July 2014. The actor relocated to Melbourne where Neighbours is filmed. Wyatt is the first indigenous actor to join the regular cast of the show since it began in 1985. Executive producer Jason Herbison told Elissa Blake from The Sydney Morning Herald that the decision to cast an indigenous actor was "unintentional" and that Wyatt was the best actor for the role. Nate is "loosely linked" to Susan (Jackie Woodburne) and Karl Kennedy (Alan Fletcher), as Susan was once married to his uncle Alex Kinski (Andrew Clarke). Meyne said his character would be "misunderstood at times, but his heart is in the right place." The actor also said that a challenging storyline would reveal the truth behind Nate's unusual behaviour.

== Dakota Davies ==
Dakota Davies
- Neighbours character
- Portrayed by: Sheree Murphy
- Duration: 2014, 2018
- First appearance: 19 September 2014
- Last appearance: 26 March 2018
- Introduced by: Jason Herbison
In-universe information
- Occupation: Businesswoman

Dakota Davies, played by Sheree Murphy, made her first screen appearance on 19 September 2014. The character and Murphy's casting was announced on 16 June 2014. The actress has previously appeared on two British soap operas and commented that she was "excited" to be returning to work. Murphy said, "It's just kicked in that it's actually happening. I'm going back to work. The kids don't remember me on Emmerdale, so they're excited about seeing mummy on TV. The last thing I did was Hollyoaks and I was really nervous. I feel a bit like that on Neighbours, not necessarily because they watch English soaps but more because it's, 'Oh, that's Harry Kewell's wife – what's she doing?'" Murphy also said that she had watched Neighbours since the beginning and was very happy to be part of the cast, calling it "unbelievable." Murphy spent six weeks filming the recurring role. Murphy later said she would be open to a longer stint with Neighbours, as she and her husband were thinking of moving to Australia permanently.

Dakota is a British businesswoman and a former partner of one of the show's regular male characters. Sophie Dainty from Digital Spy added that Dakota has not fully recovered from their break-up. It was later revealed that Dakota has a history with Paul Robinson (Stefan Dennis). Murphy also said that Dakota would have a fling with another character during her time in Erinsborough. The actress described her character as being worldly, "strong-willed" and "one of these characters where if she sees something she likes, she will just go for it – she doesn't care." Murphy added that she liked playing someone different from herself. Melissa Field from TV Week enjoyed seeing Murphy on Neighbours and branded her character "fiery".

On 5 October 2017, it was confirmed that Murphy had reprised her role, after she was photographed filming scenes for the show in London, alongside Tim Kano who plays Leo Tanaka. Of her return, Murphy stated, "I am so excited to be joining the cast of Neighbours once again! It's even more special that it's on British soil. Dakota is such a fun, sassy character to play and I am interested to see what she is up to three years on." Dakota returned for one episode on 26 March 2018.

After arriving in Erinsborough, Dakota goes to The Waterhole where she slaps and kisses Paul Robinson. When Paul catches up with Dakota, he explains that a brain tumour affected his memory and he is not sure who she is. They bond when she explains their past; he abandoned her in South America, and when his deputy, Carlos, took over the business, Dakota entered a romantic relationship with him. However, he was involved in dodgy deals and when Dakota accidentally gave information to the authorities, she fled the area, fearful of Carlos' reaction. Paul offers her a room at the Lassiter's Hotel, and she phones Carlos, revealing that she has returned to scam Paul into buying them a bar. Although initially having his doubts, Paul agrees, eager to impress her. She bumps into Mark Brennan (Scott McGregor) in the Waterhole and flirts with him. Paul shows Dakota the location for the bar at a disused radio station, and she decides that she wants to employ his nephew, Daniel (Tim Phillipps) to work in the bar. Dakota uses the bar as a front for a diamond smuggling ring. The diamonds are hidden in shipments of coffee beans, which Dakota puts in Daniel's name. She continues to flirt with Brennan and later kisses him, which angers his girlfriend, Paige (Olympia Valance), who then tips a drinks over Dakota's laptop. Paul also becomes jealous of Dakota flirting with Brennan. Dakota assures Paul that she is only interested in him. When a new shipment of diamonds come in, Dakota asks Paul to sign for them, after Daniel is arrested for jay walking. Dakota learns that Brennan used to be a detective and she tells Paul not to worry about the shipment. The police launch a sting operation and find the diamonds, while Dakota disappears. She later returns to blackmail Paul into giving her $10,000 to leave the country. Four years later, Paul's son, Leo Tanaka (Tim Kano), meets with Dakota to investigate a fire in a factory in São Paulo that killed Rafael Humphreys' (Ryan Thomas) mother. Leo pretends he is meeting with Dakota for a business meeting and Dakota explains that she and Paul were business partners in São Paulo. Dakota gets suspicious of Leo after seeing that he has a call from Lassiter's. Leo eventually reveals that he is Paul's son, before trying to force Dakota to tell him the truth by threatening her with a USB containing emails from her regarding stolen diamonds. When Leo becomes distracted, Dakota manages to take the USB and run off. It is later discovered that Dakota started the fire for compensation from her insurance company.

== Sharon Canning ==
Sharon Canning
- Neighbours character
- Portrayed by: Natasha Herbert
- Duration: 2014–2015, 2022
- First appearance: 6 October 2014
- Last appearance: 24 January 2022
- Introduced by: Jason Herbison
In-universe information
- Occupation: Cruise line worker
- Husband: Gary Canning (divorced)
- Sons: Kyle Canning

Sharon Canning, played by Natasha Herbert, made her first appearance on 6 October 2014. Herbert was introduced as the mother of Kyle Canning (Chris Milligan), who comes to Erinsborough for his wedding to Georgia Brooks (Saskia Hampele). Following Herbert's one episode stint in 2014, Milligan and Colette Mann (who plays Sheila Canning) asked producers to bring her back for a longer stint, noting that "there could be so much storyline material if she came back just for a few weeks." Producers reintroduced Sharon on-screen the following year. Herbert reprised the role in 2022, as Sharon returns for Kyle's wedding to Roxy Willis (Zima Anderson). Sharon returned on 19 January in Australia and 17 January in the UK. Herbert said that Sharon would be staying in Erinsborough "for a good time, but not a long time." In an interview posted on the serial's social media accounts, Herbert explained that Sharon is more fond of Roxy than Georgia, and Milligan later joked about Sharon's persona, saying that Sharon "just comes for the free alcohol".

Sharon visits her son, Kyle Canning, before his wedding and later watches over the ceremony in which he and Georgia Brooks are married. After talking to Matt Turner (Josef Brown) at the reception about her relationship troubles, Sharon puts her hotel key in his pocket and tells him she is leaving the following day. Five months later, Sharon returns to visit Kyle and runs into Matt again. They share a drink and Matt goes back to Sharon's hotel room, but Terese Willis (Rebekah Elmaloglou) stops Matt from taking things further. Sharon later returns to town after learning of Matt's death. Terese tells her to stay away from Matt's wife, Lauren (Kate Kendall), but Sharon goes to see her. Before she can tell Lauren about her and Matt, Terese interrupts and takes Sharon away. She later sends Sharon on a cruise. After learning the truth about Matt's affair, Lauren confronts Sharon. She tells Lauren that Terese bought her off with a cruise, and that Terese wants Lauren to stay away from her husband. Seven years later, Sharon returns for Kyle's second wedding to Roxy Willis, Terese's niece, and helps the bridal party with their preparations. Despite noticing the flirtation between Glen Donnelly (Richard Huggett) and Roxy's mother, Gemma Willis (Beth Buchanan), Sharon has sex with Glen in the honeymoon suite the night before the wedding, where they are caught by Terese and Gemma. Sharon later attends the wedding ceremony, where she continues to spend most of her time with Glen and returns to the hotel with him again afterwards, which Terese witnesses.

== Rain Taylor ==
Rain Taylor
- Neighbours character
- Portrayed by: Airlie Dodds
- First appearance: 29 October 2014
- Last appearance: 27 November 2014
- Introduced by: Jason Herbison

Rain Taylor, played by Airlie Dodds, made her first screen appearance on 29 October 2014. Dodds's casting was announced on 20 October 2014 and the role marks her television debut. The character has been previously mentioned on-screen, as Rain is Daniel Robinson's (Tim Phillipps) ex-girlfriend. Following her arrival in Erinsborough, Rain causes trouble for Daniel and his fiancée Amber Turner (Jenna Rosenow). Of Rain, Dodds stated "She is a shades of grey character because some of her actions are quite justified, but then others are so wrong. There is spookiness about her which makes playing her a lot of fun as well." Dodds later said Rain was "good-natured" and a little narcissistic.

Rain comes to Erinsborough to visit her former boyfriend, Daniel Robinson. Rain tells Daniel that she is homeless due to the closure of the community where they lived. She meets Daniel's fiancée Amber Turner, who is initially threatened by her until Rain reveals she has a boyfriend, one of Daniel's old friends Wolfie. Rain plans to establish a new community, called New Eden, in Erinsborough and speaks to Daniel's uncle Paul (Stefan Dennis) about purchasing some land. Although initially clashing with Amber at times, she convinces her of some of her hippy ways and they become friends. Rain shows her volatile side when Daniel shifts his focus from New Eden to the bar he is opening, but apologises afterwards, and begins to counsel Amber on the ways of being sustainable, like going dumpster diving. She confesses she is having problems with Wolfie, and fears he is cheating on her. However, Wolfie tells Daniel that he and Rain broke up weeks ago as she cheated on him. Amber's mother Lauren (Kate Kendall) worries about Rain's influence on Amber due to her past experience with a religious cult. Rain's plan to establish New Eden is halted when Lauren lodges an objection with the council and urges other business owners to do so too. Rain decides to head up to the Mornington Peninsula to check out a site there, and Amber announces that she and Daniel will be going with her. Amber comes to Rain for another guided meditation, and Rain uses the opportunity to manipulate Amber into breaking up with Daniel. Rain later kisses Daniel, telling him that he does not belong with Amber. He realises that she has been manipulating him and Amber. Amber and Daniel confront Rain, and she tells them that they do not belong together, before she leaves Erinsborough.

== Gary Canning ==
Gary Canning, played by Damien Richardson, made his first screen appearance on 7 November 2014. The character and casting was announced on 15 October 2014. Gary is the estranged father of Kyle Canning (Chris Milligan). Prior to his reappearance, he had not seen his son for sixteen years, having walked out on him when he was eight years old. Milligan said Kyle was unsure whether "to hit him or hug him" when they were reunited. Gary was also reunited with his mother Sheila (Colette Mann) and his sister Naomi (Morgana O'Reilly) during his time in Erinsborough. In October 2015, it was confirmed that Richardson had returned to filming and Gary returned in early 2016. He returned again from 14 June 2016, this time in a permanent capacity, remaining in the series until March 2020, when the character was killed off.

== Ezra Hanley ==
Ezra Hanley
- Neighbours character
- Portrayed by: Steve Nation
- Duration: 2014–2015
- First appearance: 19 November 2014
- Last appearance: 22 May 2015
- Introduced by: Jason Herbison
In-universe information
- Occupation: Hotel manager Acquisitions manager
- Sons: Clem Hanley

Ezra Hanley, played by Steve Nation, made his first screen appearance on 19 November 2014. Nation's casting was announced on the same day. He had previously spent twenty years auditioning for roles on Neighbours and Home and Away, so he was "thrilled" to be given a role on the show. He commented "As an actor it's an honour and a privilege to be on Neighbours. It's kind of where everyone who's anyone has been before. Hopefully, it's the game changer in my career. I've been acting for 20 years but this is another stepping stone." Nation said his character would "stir things up a little" and confirmed that following his initial guest stint, he would return to filming in February 2015.

Paul Robinson (Stefan Dennis) contacts Ezra and invites him to Lassiter's Erinsborough to help his former colleague Terese Willis (Rebekah Elmaloglou) organise a festival. Ezra soon questions Paul as to why he flew him over, believing that Paul wants him to come between Terese and her husband Brad (Kip Gamblin). Ezra later agrees to go for a drink with Terese. He decides to delay his return to Perth and he takes Terese out to dinner. While they are working in her room, they almost kiss, but Terese realises she still loves her husband, and asks Ezra to leave. However, he locks the door and attempts to assault Terese, causing her to forcefully eject him from the room. Ezra is fired, and he decides to sue both Terese and Paul. Both Paul and Brad threaten Ezra, and Terese later finds him badly beaten. After he is treated, Ezra drops the lawsuits and leaves town. It soon emerges that Paul paid Gary Canning (Damien Richardson) to attack Ezra.

The following year, the Quill Group purchases Lassiter's Erinsborough from Paul and sends their acquisitions manager, Ezra, to check it out. Soon after he arrives, Ezra is confronted by Terese. Ezra conducts an efficiency evaluation and clashes with Gary's mother, Sheila (Colette Mann). He reduces Terese's responsibilities at the hotel and demotes her to receptionist. Ezra continues to make things difficult for Terese and after he makes a suggestive comment, she quits her job. Ezra demotes Sheila and hires Nate Kinski (Meyne Wyatt) as trainee bar manager at The Waterhole. Brad tries to ask Ezra about his son, Clem (Max Whitelaw), but Ezra shuts him down and complains to Susan Kennedy (Jackie Woodburne). He later warns Brad to stay away from Clem. After Nate complains about Sheila, Ezra invites him for a drink and he tells him about the redevelopment plans for The Waterhole. Terese asks Ezra about Clem's behaviour and if it has anything to do with his ex-girlfriend Chloe Jones (Gaby Seow). Clem later tells Susan that his father assaulted Chloe. After Clem returns to Perth, Ezra angrily confronts Terese. Ezra is arrested when Chloe makes a formal complaint against him. Terese tells Ezra that his contract has been suspended and Quill have hired her to be the new manager of operations for Lassiter's.

== Erin Rogers ==
Erin Rogers
- Neighbours character
- Portrayed by: Adrienne Pickering
- Duration: 2014–2015
- First appearance: 24 November 2014
- Last appearance: 27 January 2015
- Introduced by: Jason Herbison
In-universe information
- Daughters: Cat Rogers

Erin Rogers, played by Adrienne Pickering, made her first screen appearance on 24 November 2014. The character and Pickering's casting was announced on 17 November 2014. Pickering said "she was a very challenging character to play because she is so different from me, which made the whole experience really enjoyable and interesting." Erin is a former friend of Sonya Mitchell (Eve Morey), who will shake up Erinsborough following her arrival. Pickering stated that Erin had "a dysfunctional upbringing" which has caused her to struggle to deal with situations rationally. Pickering added that as Erin has only known chaos in her life, her reactions to things could be jarring. Morey also explained that Erin was once Sonya's best friend in high school. Erin has been sending poison pen letters to Sonya, as she blames Sonya for her addiction to substances. Melinda Houston from The Sydney Morning Herald praise Pickering's performance as Erin and the storyline, writing "I'm actually rather enjoying the Erin plot arc, not least because Adrienne Pickering is doing such a good job (within the confines of the genre) of playing a woman on the edge. Her scenes generate genuine angst, and the unfolding of events is equally believable."

Erin breaks into Sonya Mitchell's house and knocks Mark Brennan (Scott McGregor) unconscious. She later returns and is confronted by Sonya and her husband Toadfish Rebecchi (Ryan Moloney). Erin admits to sending poison pen letter to Sonya's friends and neighbours, as she blames Sonya for her addiction to drugs and the subsequent loss of her daughter to social services. Erin is charged with assault, stalking and trespass. Toadie visits Erin at the police station and warns her to stay away from his family. A few days later, Sonya confronts Erin and then pays her bail. Sonya vows to help Erin get back on her feet and reconnect with her daughter. She takes Erin to The Waterhole, knowing there is a job available, and Sheila Canning (Colette Mann) hires Erin to collect glasses. Brennan tells Sheila that Erin sent Sonya the poison pen letters, causing Erin to quit her job. Sonya brings some food to Erin's squat on Christmas Day. Erin nearly collapses from a coughing fit, but tells Sonya to leave.

Brennan returns and convinces Erin to go to the hospital to get medication. After learning that her living conditions are making her health worse, he invites her to stay with him. Erin begins a treatment program overseen by Karl Kennedy (Alan Fletcher) and learns her daughter wants to see her. Erin borrows money from Sonya to buy a new dress. She meets with a drug dealer, but later tells Sonya that she did not make a purchase. Erin's daughter, Cat (Maleeka Gasbarri), does not come to meet her, but she later arranges another time and Erin becomes stressed. She propositions Karl in a bid to get something to calm her down. Cat's visit goes well, until she learns that Erin came to see her cricket matches, but did not speak with her. Erin writes Cat a letter and Cat returns. She and Erin bond while playing cricket. Sonya convinces Erin to ask Cat to stay a few days, and Cat agrees. The pressure becomes too much for Erin and she takes Mark's wallet and watch, before fleeing. Sonya later catches up with Erin outside a pawn shop and begs her to come back, but Erin refuses.

== Others ==
Date(s)	Character	Actor	Circumstances
6 January	Juston Cicero	Nic Romney	Justin is a paramedic who attends to Georgia Brooks, after she suffers a head injury and gas inhalation.
9 January	Nigel Sheppard	Sean Ladhams	Nigel is the head of acquisitions for the Quill Hotel Group. He and Paul Robinson negotiate a deal for Lassiter's Hotel to join the group.
14 January	Louise Flannagan	Samantha Lavale	Louise spots up-and-coming swimmer Joshua Willis in the park and asks for a picture. She also gives Josh her phone number and tells him to call her.
15 January	Sylvie Johns	Camille Edwards	Sylvie tells Karl Kennedy that she is not going to vote for him in the mayoral election out of concern for his wife, who has multiple sclerosis.
15 January	Nora Evans	Ali Ryrie-Golding	Nora photographs Joshua Willis for a jewellery line that he is endorsing.
21 January 2014, 11 November 2015, 13 September 2016	Dale Lancer	Nick Backstrom	Dale is a representative from Harper Mining company looking to host a conference at Lassiter's Hotel. After Mason Turner tells him about a recent explosion in the grounds of Lassiter's, Dale awards the account to a rival hotel group. The following year, Dale meets with Paul Robinson to discuss buying a property on the planned Freestyle housing estate. He signs a contract after being convinced that it is a good investment by Daniel Robinson. The following year, Dale, now a drug tester, informs Gary Canning that his racing pigeon has been doped and he takes the pigeon in for further testing.
22 January–3 February	Isaac Woods	Josh Burton	Isaac asks to borrow a law book from Imogen Willis, who later finds that he is squatting at Number 24. Imogen befriends Isaac and brings him food. Imogen invites Isaac on a camping trip, but makes it clear nothing will happen between them. Isaac is later arrested for selling off the furniture in Number 24. He does not think it is a big deal and insults Imogen, saying he should not have gotten involved with a school girl.
23 January	Nicole Livingstone	Herself	Nicole interviews Joshua Willis after he competes for a spot in the 2014 Commonwealth Games.
28 January	Love Your Sister	Samuel Johnson	The Love Your Sister campaign visits the Lassiter's Complex to raise awareness of breast cancer.
28 January	Love Your Sister	Connie Johnson	The Love Your Sister campaign visits the Lassiter's Complex to raise awareness of breast cancer.
28 January	Bevan Lockwood	Michael Davoren	Bevan is a letting agent, who shows a couple around Number 24.
4–14 February	Loki	Uncredited	Loki is a dog bought by Callum Rebecchi, who is given to Josie Lamb as a present. Josie names him Loki, but later tells Callum that she cannot keep him due to her allergies, so Callum takes him in. Toadie Rebecchi says Callum cannot keep the dog either, so Callum puts posters up to sell Loki, but purposely makes the poster looks bad so he is not sold. Loki ceases to make any further appearances following.
6 February	Dr Anthony Croker	Philip Hayden	Brad Willis contacts Dr Anthony, a specialist sports surgeon, to operate on his son Josh's injured shoulder. Following the surgery, Dr Anthony breaks the news that tears to Josh's rotator cuff were deeper than he first thought and Josh will not be able to compete at the top level of swimming.
7 February	James Spector	Robin Darch	While he is in Charlie's, James tries flirting with Kate Ramsay and offers to buy her a drink. She tells him she is not interested and Mark Brennan chases James off.
7 February	Wendy Barkley	Danielle Butlin	Wendy is a receptionist at Lassiter's Hotel, who tells hotel manager, Terese Willis, that Mason Turner has not shown up for work.
26 February–6 March	Kirk Porter	Michael Kirwan	While he is at the gym, Kirk notices Joshua Willis having problems with his injured shoulder. He tells Josh that he needs something stronger than the painkillers he is on and offers to get him something stronger. Kirk later offers Josh some more pills, telling him the come down will be bad. After initially declining, Josh accepts when the pain in his shoulder gets worse.
26 February	Jed Burger	Luke D'Emanuele	Jed enquires after buying half a car from Mason Turner. When he learns that he would be sharing it with a girl, Jed seems keen. But Mason then tells him the car is no longer for sale.
3 March–25 April	Stephen Montague	Damian Hill	Montague is Danni Ferguson's abusive ex-boyfriend, who tries to kidnap her. Mark Brennan tackles Montague, while Kyle Canning saves Danni. Montague is then arrested by the police, but later granted bail. Montague returns and breaks into Number 24 to find Danni. He tries to attack Chris Pappas, before escaping. Montague sends Mark a threatening text and drives by Kyle's yard. He later appears in the Lassiter's Complex and Chris gives chase, before he is knocked out. When Mark's fiancée, Kate, dies after being shot, the police and Mark suspect Montague killed her. Montague breaks into Number 24 again and holds Mark and Imogen Willis hostage. After Mark tackles him, Montague escapes and goes into Number 32's backyard, where he holds Callum Jones hostage in the shed. Callum convinces Montague to go to Number 30, where he hits him over the head and escapes. Montague is then arrested, but he denies shooting Kate and the police confirm he has an alibi.
4 March	Susanna Toms	Emily Buxton-D'Arcy	Susanna teaches a yoga class at Dingoes Gym, which is attended by Georgia Brooks and Kate Ramsay.
5 March	Reno Cardillo	Robert Rokosi	Reno teaches a salsa class at the Community Centre and dances with Terese Willis.
11 March	Billie Tyler	Tamzen Hayes	Billie brings her son Alex to the hospital when he develops a rash. Georgia Brooks takes care of them.
11 March	Baby Alex Tyler	Otis Roberts	Billie brings her son Alex to the hospital when he develops a rash. Georgia Brooks takes care of them.
13 March	Sam Maxwell	Peter Verheyen	Georgia Brooks tells the Maxwells to go home and get some rest, after their daughter is admitted. They thank Georgia for her help.
13 March	Felicity Maxwell	Alexandra McTavish	Georgia Brooks tells the Maxwells to go home and get some rest, after their daughter is admitted. They thank Georgia for her help.
26 March 2014, 3 May 2016	Aaron Fleming	Marc Mulcahey	Aaron meets with Kyle Canning at his yard to discuss building materials for a project. Aaron is attracted to Kyle, and Georgia Brooks catches him checking Kyle out. She later poses as Kyle's girlfriend to put Aaron off. Two years later, Aaron is brought into the police station to provide Tom Quill with an alibi. Aaron explains that he was with Tom the night of the explosion at Lassiter's Hotel. He asks Mark Brennan not to tell his wife.
31 March–1 April	Talia Maslin	Ella Cannon	Talia is Toadfish Rebecchi's assistant. Talia visits Toadie's wife, Sonya, to drop off some files and she lets slip that Toadie has been talking to her about his marital problems. Sonya confronts Talia when she finds a sexy picture of her in Toadie's files. Talia calls Sonya paranoid and Sonya fires her. Talia tells Callum Jones that the picture was meant for her boyfriend. Sonya apologises, but Talia explains that she has found another job.
3 April	Lisa Tucker	Millie Samuels	Lauren Carpenter and Brad Willis fly Lisa to Erinsborough, as they believe she is their adopted daughter. Lisa gets on well with Brad and Lauren's families, but Brad's wife, Terese, suspects Lisa is lying when she forgets how long her adoptive parents have been dead for. Lisa later admits that she lied, because her father is in prison and her mother wants nothing to do with her. After a blood typing test, Lisa learns that Brad and Lauren are not her biological parents.
7 April–17 June	Victor Cleary	Richard Sutherland	On the day Kate Ramsay is shot, Victor watches Chris Pappas chase after Stephen Montague, before getting up from his table at Harold's Store. Months later, while reviewing CCTV footage from his builders yard, Kyle Canning sees Victor hiding something in his mulch. Holly Hoyland identifies Victor as a friend of her mother and it emerges he is Gus Cleary's brother. Paul meets with Victor, who explains that he was waiting for Gus to testify in court for him, but Gus never showed up thanks to Paul and Victor was sent to jail. Paul tries to give Victor money, but he refuses to take it and then taunts him about Kate. Paul pulls out a gun, but the police arrive and arrest Victor. He confesses to killing Kate and apologises to Mark Brennan, Kate's fiancée. He also tells him to make sure Paul suffers for what he did to his brother. Off-screen, Victor is sentenced to life imprisonment.
10 April	Dave Reilly	Lucas Linehan	Dave is a builder working on the refurbishment on Charlie's. When Paul Robinson asks who authorised the work, Dave inadvertently insults him.
14 April	Guillermo Ibáñez	John Burgos	Guillermo and Mirelle meet with lawyer Toadfish Rebecchi and Naomi Canning to discuss and finalise a deal. Guillermo and Mirelle argue, but Guillermo later explains that Mirelle was nagging him about his diet.
14 April	Mariana Ibáñez	Mirelle Vidal	Guillermo and Mirelle meet with lawyer Toadfish Rebecchi and Naomi Canning to discuss and finalise a deal. Guillermo and Mirelle argue, but Guillermo later explains that Mirelle was nagging him about his diet.
15 April	Tim Miller	Jack Osbourne	Tim meets with Zeke Kinski at the Lassiter's Complex, but when they are spotted by Karl and Susan Kennedy, Tim leaves.
16 April	Victoria Elmahdi	Sophia Emberson-Bain	Victoria is Zeke Kinski's fiancée. She arrives in Erinsborough to meet with Zeke's step-parents Karl and Susan Kennedy. Victoria and Zeke then get married that same day.
16 April	Wayne Foster	Daniel Humphris	Wayne is a marriage celebrant, who marries Zeke Kinski and Victoria Elmahdi. He mispronounces Zeke's name several times during the ceremony.
21 April–5 May	Rick Blaine	James Harvy	Rick is a photographer, who employs Amber Turner as an intern. He reprimands her for not charging the batteries in a camera, but is impressed with her alternative suggestion for the shoot. He later offers her a job, saying she has potential. Rick is the official photographer for the reopening of The Waterhole and he shouts at a confused Doug Willis, when he gets in the way. Amber quits her job when Rick is rude to Nell Rebecchi and her family.
29 April	Norm Symonds	Adam McConvell	Norm comes to Ramsay Street to find Naomi Canning, on behalf of the wife of Naomi's lover, who wants a painting she has returned. After Norm forces his way into Naomi's home, Sheila Canning kicks him and sends him away.
29 April–6 May	Tracey Wong	Aileen Huynh	Tracy is a private investigator hired by Paul Robinson to look into Kate Ramsay's death. Tracey later finds that Sienna Matthews was in the hotel minutes before Kate was shot. Brad Willis hires Tracey to find his daughter.
12 May	Polly Tranner	Michelle O'Grady	Polly comes to Erinsborough to retrieve a painting that her husband Charles gave to his lover Naomi Canning. Polly berates Naomi over her affair and they end up in a scrag fight. Naomi's mother, Sheila, breaks them up, but when Polly insults Naomi, she pushed Polly to the ground and encourages her daughter to fight her. The police then break up the fight.
14–15 May	Charles Tranner	David Whiteley	Charles comes to Erinsborough to see his lover Naomi Canning. When Charles insults Naomi's mother Sheila, she throws a drink at him. Naomi asks Charles to sign a document saying he gave her an expensive painting, which his wife, Polly wants back. Charles later flirts with Georgia Brooks, leading Naomi to realise that he will not sign her document. She gets her lawyer, Toadfish Rebecchi, involved and he threatens to take the matter to court. Charles gets Polly to drop the charges against Naomi, in return for the painting.
16 May–31 October	Bryce Bukowski	Keith Purcell	Bryce joins some of the Erinsborough High students planting trees at the school. Bryce watches on as an argument breaks out between Josie Mackay and his friend Jayden Warley. Jayden later challenges Bailey Turner to a fight, but Bailey manages to bribe him, Bryce and their friends with alcohol. Bryce later taunts Bailey over his attempts to fight Jayden. While walking through the Lassiter's complex, following a tornado, Bryce throws an empty can on the floor and is ordered to pick it up by Paul Robinson. Bryce later plans a Halloween prank in Ramsay Street, but Toadfish Rebecchi catches him and tells him off.
28 May	James Bunkum	Johnny McNamara	James goes on a date with Naomi Canning, which turns into a double date with Sonya and Toadfish Rebecchi. Sonya argues with James about his environmental issues and he insults her, Naomi and Sheila.
4 June	Karina Purcell	Tessa Donnithorne	Karina tells Bailey Turner that Jayden Warley is being unfair on him and gives him her number, so they can talk. When they later meet up, Karina praises Bailey and then asks him to bring some alcohol to a gathering, making him realise she is using him.
5–6 June	Honor Taylor	Ann Truong	Mark Brennan notices Honor struggling to fix her shoe in Harold's Store, and offers to fix it for her. They flirt and talk about Doctor Who, before Mark suddenly leaves the store.
16 June 2014, 13 July 2016, 16 January–10 February 2017, 10–31 December 2018	Kev McNally	Troy Davis	Kev sells Paul Robinson a gun. Two years later, Kev meets up with Gary Canning, who asks him if he has any work going. Kev offers him a job delivering illegal goods, but Gary turns it down. A few months later, Gary arranges a meeting with Kev to ask for work, as he has debts to pay. The following year, Kev visits Gary with a job offer delivering stolen goods, which Gary accepts.
19–30 June	Lee Barnes	James O'Connell	Lee accepts $500 from Naomi Canning to break into her house and act as her stalker. Lee loses his hat during his escape and is chased by Toadfish Rebecchi. Lee later returns for his money and increases his price to $5000 when he learns the police are involved. Naomi struggles to get the money and gives Lee the keys to a car, so he can steal it. Naomi later meets with Lee and blackmails him into forgetting her debt with photos of him taking the car.
20 June	Mike Enekwe	Idelson Mabjaia	Mike notices Imogen Willis in The Waterhole and asks her to play pool with him. They are later told off by bar manager Sheila Canning for kissing.
3 July, 8 October	Ricky Masters	Patrick Williams	While inspecting his gym, Ricky tells his manager, Brad Willis, that the books are not up to date. He then notices Brad's son Josh and Paige Smith mucking around and is not pleased. After learning that Brad has been running yoga classes on the side, Ricky fires Brad for breaching his contract. A few months after hiring Josh Willis as the new manager, Ricky meets with Josh to tell him that he is fired, as the gym is looking for someone with more experience.
3–14 July	Belinda Long	Katrina Gow	Belinda is a councillor, who meets with Terese Willis to discuss an application to extend Lassiter's trading hours. Belinda later informs Paul Robinson that a complaint has been made against him.
15–25 July	Anya Salter	Lauren Brumby	Anya is a journalist from the West Waratah Star, who asks Karl Kennedy for a response to the rumours that Paul Robinson is unfit to be Mayor. She also asks him if he would run should the position become available. Karl tells Anya that Paul has his full support. Days later, Anya attempts to question Imogen Willis about her brothers' assault on Chris Pappas, when Terese Willis tells them to leave her alone. Anya then asks Terese about her decision not to increase security at Lassiter's.
17 July–11 August 2014, 24 April–16 October 2015	Hayley Hahn	Lucy Barrett	Hayley is an Erinsborough High student. She develops a crush on new teacher Brad Willis. She later mocks Principal Susan Kennedy about her husband's erotic novel. The following year, Hayley flirts with Mark Brennan at The Waterhole. When she initiates a game of pool, Sheila Canning comes over and tells Hayley that Mark is her lover and Hayley leaves. A few months later, Hayley holds her hen night at The Waterhole. She gets drunk and her friends leave her behind, so Sheila escorts her to a taxi. While in The Waterhole with friends, Hayley moves a stool out of the way for Toadfish Rebecchi, who uses a wheelchair, and spills her drink on him. She then tells him that he is very brave.
17 July–5 November 2014, 27 March 2015	Alice Azikiwe	Vivienne Awosoga	Alice is Bailey Turner's rival for NASA space camp. Alice and Bailey compete to become president of the school's astronomy club. When Alice recruits more students and gets them to sign a proxy that means they vote for her, Bailey sets up a rival club. Alice gets Bailey's sister, Amber, to take her picture for her space camp application and Bailey does the same. However, he later learns that Alice set him up and did not send a picture after all. Both Alice and Bailey reach the interview stage. While helping to clear up after a tornado, Alice taunts Bailey about space camp, but Bailey tells her he is more focused on his family, who are going through a tough time. Alice later gives Bailey a copy of The Art of War to cheer him up and they kiss. Alice and Bailey begin dating, and Bailey is tempted to give up his space camp dream for her, until Alice tells him not. Alice gets into space camp and she admits that while she is happy, she also feels bad that Bailey did not get in. They both agree to deal with their issues the best they can. Alice breaks-up with Bailey when she can not include him in her schedule. They say their goodbyes, before she leaves for her uncle's house in the mountains. Months later, Alice returns from space camp to see Bailey. After they talk, Bailey kisses her and they move to the bed, but he suddenly breaks down and, as Alice comforts him, he admits that his father died a few days earlier.
29 July	Megan Dennison	Stefanie Jones	Megan arrives from Canberra to meet with Kathy Carpenter, who believes she is the granddaughter she put up for adoption. Paige Smith introduces herself to Megan and takes her outside to talk. Megan then leaves and sends Kathy a text to say it was all a mistake.
30 July	Kalika De Silva	Tarah Carey	Kalika is a vet who treats Bossy after she is bitten by a tiger snake.
11 August 2014, 13 February 2015	Aimee Wu	Catherine Larcey	Aimee is one of several women who try to talk to Karl Kennedy in The Waterhole about his erotic novel The Book of Secrets. The following year, Aimee notices Lou Carpenter and Sheila Canning bickering in Harold's Store and mistakes them for a couple.
11 August 2014	Grant Tao	Damien Harrison	Grant meets with Naomi Canning for a date after seeing her dating profile online. He tells her he thought she was taller, had a different nose and a different style of hair, so he leaves.
19 August	Stu Brown	Matt Burn	Stu asks to join in a game of totem tennis and then tries to take Paige Smith's racket, leading Nate Kinski to tackle him to the ground.
27 August–19 September	Alan Haywood	Paul Roberts	Alan arranges to meet Sheila Canning at a wine and cheese tasting event, after meeting on an online dating site. Sheila's nerves cause her to become clumsy and when she knocks over a leaflet stand, Alan takes the blame for her. He and Sheila arrange a second date. Sheila cooks for Alan and he meets her daughter, Naomi, who he kisses on the lips when he leaves. Alan and Sheila go on another date. Naomi confronts Alan about an online dating profile she has found and urges him to tell Sheila about it. Alan tells Sheila that he took his profile down from dating sites for women, but he still has his profile up on dating sites for men. Sheila breaks up with him because he lied to her.
1 September	Johanna Mayberry	Elmira Jurik	Johanna is a Channel 12 news reporter, who warns viewers that a large storm is heading towards Erinsborough.
2 September	Bar Man	Stephen Hawkins	The bar man stays at The Waterhole during the tornado and brings towels for Georgia Brooks when she turns up.
5 September	Oliver	Uncredited	An orphaned, young wombat that is found by Imogen Willis and Daniel Robinson when they hear his cries from a bush. As Imogen is cuddling him, Daniel discovers that Paul Robinson accidentally hit the wombat's mother with his car during the Erinsborough tornado. Imogen calls Wildlife Victoria and uses Daniel's jumper to warm the wombat. Imogen decides to name the wombat Oliver, after Oliver Twist, before Wildlife Victoria comes to pick him up. Imogen later receives a call telling her that Oliver's injuries are only superficial and that he will survive.
10 September	Max Kimble	Peter Thackerah	A man who rejects Josh Willis' offer of joining Dingo's Gym.
11 September	Party Pablo Pyke	Byron Adu	Pablo drives Paige Smith home to Ramsay Street and he kisses her, before she goes home.
12 September	Ranger Sally	Sally Willis	A ranger who brings Erin to Paul Robinson's press conference.
12 September	Erin	Uncredited	A wombat who Paul Robinson uses as part of a press conference, claiming she is Oliver.
22 September	Zayn Robertson	Travis Khan	Zayn and Lexi are strippers hired for Georgia Brooks and Kyle Canning's hen and bucks parties, who initially go to the wrong addresses.
22 September	Lexi Stringer	Bridget Bailey	Zayn and Lexi are strippers hired for Georgia Brooks and Kyle Canning's hen and bucks parties, who initially go to the wrong addresses.
22 September	Tony Ronson	John Van Putten	Tony notices Chris Pappas and Josh Willis arguing outside The Waterhole and tells Chris to let Josh back inside. Chris and Nate Kinski tell him to move on, and Tony calls Chris a loser.
29 September	Lorna Kriptic	Kaylee Archer	Lorna visits Harold's with her mother, Sandra Kriptic, and notices that Daniel Robinson is giving out free hugs, so she asks for one.
30 September 2014, 10 October 2014, 17 September 2015	Greta Jackson	Alexis Porter	Greta is Mark Brennan's former witness protection handler and a federal agent. Mark contacts Greta about Dakota Davis, after he becomes suspicious about her. Greta informs Mark that Dakota has links to a diamond smuggling operation and asks him to go undercover and befriend Dakota. Mark later Greta that Dakota is using bags of coffee beans to smuggle the diamonds into Australia. The police raid Dakota's bar, but she escapes.
2–16 October	Layla Azikiwe	Carolyn Shakespeare-Allen	When Layla comes to the Turner's to picks up her granddaughter, Alice, she meets Lou Carpenter, who she recognises as being E. M. Williams, an erotic novel writer. Layla admits to Lou that his first book changed her life. Lou and Layla start spending time together. When Layla invites Lou to her hotel room to role play scenes from the book, he panics and leaves. Layla comes to his house and says that she realises he is doing research for his next book, and that she will be back. Lou then leaves the country to get away from her.
6 October 2014, 27 April–9 May 2015	Rhonda Brooks	Kim Denman	Rhonda comes to Erinsborough for her daughter, Georgia's wedding. She and Sheila Canning help Georgia to get ready. The following year, Rhonda returns to visit Georgia. She also meets with Nick Petrides, an oncologist, who starts her on a course of treatment for cancer. Karl Kennedy later pulls Rhonda to one side and asks her about her treatment, explaining that he has been tasked with checking Nick's patients in the wake of his arrest. Georgia catches them together and Rhonda tells her that her cancer has returned. Angie Rebecchi later learns that Rhonda is in remission.
6 October	Patto Brooks	Aston Elliot	Patto accompanies his wife, Rhonda, to their daughter, Georgia's wedding.
17–24 October 2014, 21 February 2020	Gretchen Kruger	Elissa Elliott	Gretchen is a potential client of Toadfish Rebecchi's law firm. Imogen Willis directs her to Toadie's house, and Gretchen walks in on him and his wife, Sonya, in the nude. They apologise, but Gretchen tells them that she is a naturist too and invites them to dinner. Gretchen later returns with her husband, Niklas, for a naked lunch. They are interrupted by Karl Kennedy, who is looking for a lost scratchcard, and after he takes his clothes off, he tells Gretchen and Niklas that he is a naturist too. Niklas asks Sonya and Toadie if they would like to go to a naturist resort with him and Gretchen, but Toadie soon admits that he and Sonya are not really naturists. Gretchen is impressed with the lengths they went to, to secure the contract, and she and Niklas give it to them. Six years later, Gretchen and Niklas attend a naked brunch at The Waterhole, after being invited by Karl and Toadie.
24 October 2014, 21 February 2020	Niklas Kruger	Frank Handrum	
27 October	Brandon Swain	Tim Constantine	Brandon brings his car to Fitzgerald Motors. He later returns to get his phone, but Josh Willis tells him that he cannot let him touch the car while it is being worked on. Brandon ignores Josh and accidentally releases the handbrake, while retrieving his phone, causing the car to roll into Josh.
6 November	Judge Lockwood	Nina Landis (voice)	Judge Lockwood presides over Josh Willis' court case following his coward punch on Chris Pappas. Judge Lockwood sentences him to 300 hours of community service.
13 November	Barry Burdett	Giordano Gangl	Barry is Josh Willis' community service supervisor. When Josh asks to leave, so he can find his missing grandfather, Barry refuses to let him go. Josh decides to leave anyway, aware that Barry will have to report his absence to his probation officer. When Josh returns, Barry lets him get back to work when his sisters, Paige and Imogen, plead his case.
13 November	Isabella Pinter	Lea Porcaro	Isabella is a DHS worker who checks up on Nell Rebecchi after she receives a complaint that Nell's mother, Sonya, is neglecting her. Isabella finds that everything is fine and tells Sonya that she had to follow up the complaint due to Sonya's history.
14 November	Brooke Zhou	Victoria Chiu	While Brooke and her daughter Willow are looking around Sonya's Nursery, they find a novelty pig planter. Willow wants it, but Karl Kennedy tells her that it belongs to him and was kidnapped from his garden. He asks Willow if there is anything else in the nursery that she wants instead of the pig, and she points out an expensive scarecrow that Karl buys for her.
14 November	Willow Zhou	Lauren Wu	While Brooke and her daughter Willow are looking around Sonya's Nursery, they find a novelty pig planter. Willow wants it, but Karl Kennedy tells her that it belongs to him and was kidnapped from his garden. He asks Willow if there is anything else in the nursery that she wants instead of the pig, and she points out an expensive scarecrow that Karl buys for her.
20 November	Ava Rosetta	Bella Merrington	Ava is Nate Kinski's therapist.
27 November	Morris Richards	Nick Dutt	Morris sells Gary Canning some tools out of the back of his car.
28 November	Axl	Uncredited	Karl Kennedy brings home an axolotl and names him Axl, after Axl Rose. Karl's wife, Susan Kennedy, is opposed to the pet, so Chris Pappas and Nate Kinski say that axolotls sometimes turn on their owners. Karl later cannot find Axl, but Susan spots him under a rock in his aquarium. Spooked, Karl gives Axl away to Chris and Nate.
1 December 2014, 27 May 2015	Phil Tractor	Michael Gwynne	Phil comes to Number 22 to serve Terese Willis with legal papers. The following year, he serves Sheila Canning with papers in the street.
3 December	Ralph the Elf	Cameron Zayec	Ralph notices Georgia Brooks and Bailey Turner dressed as Christmas Elves eating lunch outside Harold's Store. He comes over to tell them off for not being "elf-like". When Ralph returns he tells Georgia and Bailey to leave, and when they refuse, he takes Bailey's hat. Bailey chases him around the Lassiter's Complex, until Georgia stops them. She tells them to shake hands, but Ralph just leaves.
4 December	Stuart Pearson	Sam Winspear-Schillings	Stuart insults Sheila Canning when he sees her dressed up as Santa Claus. Sheila then scares him off by threatening to bite him.
4 December	Oliver Klozoff	Ravi Chand	Oliver is a representative from the council who tells Naomi Canning that her planned Christmas carols event cannot go ahead as she does not have the correct liability insurance. Naomi's mother, Sheila, locks Oliver in an office while the event takes place and lets him out when it is over.
