= Toadie Rebecchi =

Fictional character from Neighbours

- Neighbours character
- Portrayed by: Ryan Moloney
- Duration: 1995–2025
- First appearance: 23 January 1995
- Last appearance: 8 September 2025
- Created by: Elizabeth Packett
- Introduced by: Stanley Walsh
- Spin-off appearances: Neighbours vs Zombies (2014); Summer Stories (2017); Neighbours vs Time Travel (2017)
In-universe information
- Occupation: Erinsborough High student; Coffee Shop waiter; Barman; Eden University student; Disc Jockey; Lassiter's Hotel staff; Lawyer
- Father: Kevin Rebecchi
- Mother: Angie Rebecchi
- Brothers: Shane Rebecchi; Stonefish Rebecchi
- Wife: Dee Bliss (2003); Stephanie Scully (2010–divorced); Sonya Mitchell (2013–2019); Melanie Pearson (2022–; divorced); Terese Willis (2023–;separated)
- Sons: Hugo Somers
- Daughters: Nell Rebecchi
- Adoptive sons: Callum Rebecchi
- Aunts: Janelle Timmins; Coral Reeves; Rhonda Brooks
- Nephews: Jay Rebecchi
- Nieces: Yashvi Rebecchi; Kirsha Rebecchi
- First cousins: Dylan Timmins; Stingray Timmins; Janae Timmins; Bree Timmins (adoptive); Anne Baxter; Tad Reeves; Gemma Reeves; Georgia Brooks
- Other relatives: Kerry Mangel

Jarrod Vincenzo Rebecchi, commonly known as "Toadfish" or "Toadie", is a fictional character from the Australian soap opera Neighbours, played by Ryan Moloney. He made his first screen appearance during the episode broadcast on 23 January 1995. Toadie was created by writer Elizabeth Packett. Moloney had previously auditioned for another role in the show and had played a minor character before being cast as Toadie. The actor was originally scheduled to play Toadie in one scene, but he went on to become a recurring cast member. When Toadie became popular with viewers, Moloney was promoted to the regular cast. In 2015, Moloney celebrated his 20th anniversary with Neighbours. The finale of the serial in 2022 focused on his character's wedding to Melanie Pearson (Lucinda Cowden), while the 2023 premiere of the revival focused on the character's wedding to Terese Willis (Rebekah Elmaloglou). Toadie departed as a regular character on 25 September 2024, with guest appearances following over the subsequent year until 8 September 2025.

Toadie was initially portrayed as a troubled teenager and a "class clown". After qualifying as a lawyer, Toadie matured into a responsible member of the community. Labelled "unlucky in love", Toadie has had several love interests and has been married five times, most enduringly to Sonya Rebecchi (Eve Morey), a fan-favourite decade-long romance tragically cut short by Sonya's death to Ovarian Cancer in 2019.

Toadie has received mostly positive attention from television critics and viewers. For his portrayal of Toadie, Moloney earned a nomination for Best Actor in a Soap at the 2004 Rose d'Or Awards. In 2010, Moloney won the first Best Daytime Star award at the Inside Soap Awards. He has since won it four more times in 2011, 2012, 2019, and 2024. He was also nominated for the Logie Award for Most Popular Actor in 2019.

== Creation and casting ==
The character of Toadfish was created by writer Elizabeth Packett. Actor Ryan Moloney was cast in the role after previously auditioning for the role of Brett Stark and appearing as a minor character called Cyborg, who vandalised the Willis family's property. Moloney made his first appearance as Toadie during the episode broadcast on 23 January 1995. He recalled that his first scene lasted for ten minutes and that it featured Toadie begging his brother, Stonefish (Anthony Engelman), to take him to the beach. Moloney was originally contracted to play Toadie in that one scene, but he went on to become a recurring character. He thought the producers kept him on as he looked similar to Engelman when he was younger and they wanted to see more of the Rebecchi family. Toadie proved to be popular with the Neighbours viewers and he was asked to continue on the show full-time.

By 2003 Moloney said he had remained grounded and surpassed the "big-headed stuff" that comes with being in a soap opera. Moloney celebrated his 15th year on Neighbours in 2010. Moloney said: "Fifteen years on the show is quite an achievement in my eyes." During an interview with entertainment website, Digital Spy, Moloney said "Like Toadie, I've literally grown up with Neighbours. Since I started out as a tearaway teenager in the series, I've experienced many transformations." Moloney told What's on TV that he plans to stay in Neighbours until the producers decide that they no longer require his service. He also added "It's just the best job in the world. I turn up, I muck around, tell a few jokes and then go home." In 2015, Moloney celebrated his 20th anniversary with Neighbours. Series producer Jason Herbison told Inside Soap that a major storyline was planned for Toadie, featuring returning characters connected to him.

== Development ==
=== Characterisation ===
Toadie as he appeared in 1998, with his long hairstyle.

Toadie's nickname was derived from the toadfishes of Australia. The serial's official website described a young Toadie as "fun-loving, mischievous and the class clown." TV Week branded Toadie "another troubled-teen-turned-good" who was "fond of a practical joke". Soap opera reporting website, Holy Soap, said he was "initially a bit of a layabout" that "got his act together and qualified as a lawyer." He also observed him as coming in "as a rough bloke and now he's a nancy." Toadie is portrayed as an "unlucky in love character". He would often be played as the "third-wheel" alongside Billy Kennedy (Jesse Spencer), who was more popular with female characters. In 2003, Moloney said: "Billy always got the chicks and it annoyed me because I wanted a chance at pashing someone... and now it's all making up for lost time." Moloney said when Toadie is "not in love and when he's not heartbroken" he has the ability to do anything he wants.

Toadie's persona is similar to Moloney's in the sense that they both "mess around". He further added, "In fact he is me, seeing how much fun and frivolity I can get away with." Moloney documented Toadie changing from "a bit of a bad boy" into a "lawyer who’s supposedly a responsible member of the community." He felt that, to begin with, Toadie was not a good lawyer, because many of his clients would receive prison sentences. On Toadie's professionalism, Moloney said he is the type of lawyer that "probably likes to take his pants off behind the desk."

Toadie initially had long hair. Moloney stated that his styling of a mullet was based on Scott Robinson's (Jason Donovan) hairstyle, and jested that it appeared as though a possum was on his head. When Moloney wanted to cut his hair in 1999, the writers chose to incorporate his decision into a storyline in which a "reluctant" Toadie offers to have his hair cut for charity, which is performed by Lou Carpenter (Tom Oliver).

=== Relationships ===
In one storyline Toadie and Connor O'Neill (Patrick Harvey) decide to take part in local wrestling, where he meets Genevieve Doyle (Lulu McClatchy). Moloney was required to train and learn wrestling routines in preparation for his scenes. He found it "physical and hard" to perform the stunts, without bringing any harm to himself or colleagues.

Toadie begins a relationship with old friend Steph Scully (Carla Bonner). Their relationship develops after Steph's marriage to Max Hoyland (Stephen Lovatt) falls apart. During an interview with What's on TV, Bonner said they have been friends for years, "but it’s never extended beyond friendship until now." Bonner thought it was "inevitable" because they spent so much time together and he fitted into her life. She concluded "Toadie’s been a fantastic support to Steph, there every step of the way." They later become engaged. Describing the developments in Toadie and Steph's relationship during 2008, Dan Bennet speaking for Network Ten stated: "Steph has already agreed to a long engagement with Toadie, but she's not ready to marry. This relationship will reach a massive fork in the road early in the new year. Toadie will force Steph to decide what she wants from this relationship." Moloney said that considering Toadie's ill-fated association with weddings, he "should stay single forever. It's safer that way." Executive Producer Susan Bower said Toadie and Steph would always be "soul mates." Although she opined they did not have real love between them and there were other characters more suited to Steph.

=== Adoption ===
In 2008, viewers saw Toadie trying to adopt an East Timorese orphan, after claiming that he had lived in Indonesia for 12 months. Producers decided to stop the storyline at the last minute and they introduced Callum Jones (Morgan Baker) for Toadie instead. Of the axed storyline, Moloney said "I thought was just ridiculous. And it was just to spite Steph! I was like, 'What are we doing?'" To begin with Toadie is more of a brother figure to Callum. Moloney said this was because Toadie "has no idea what he is doing with kids and constantly gets angry and shouts at him first. He then thinks about his actions and tries to think how he can get through to him better." Bower was pleased with their progression. She said Toadie was "working incredibly well with Mini Me" Callum. Toadie becomes close to Callum's teacher, Kelly Katsis (Katrina Milosevic). Though they date and kiss, nothing more happens between the pair. Moloney said that Toadie's newfound parental role had to come foremost to his own feelings. Moloney added "He's new to fatherhood and it's like baptism of fire." Though he did feel that Kelly would have been a good character to keep in Toadie's life. Callum started emulating certain characteristics of Toadie, and Moloney stated that he was like a young version of his character.

=== Sonya Mitchell ===
Toadie meets Sonya Mitchell (Eve Morey) and they begin a relationship. Moloney told Holy Soap that Sonya is Toadie's "someone special" and that she is perfect for him. Of Sonya, Moloney said "She's funny and a little bit zany and really accepting and loving as well." However, their relationship ends when Toadie reveals that he is back together with Steph. Toadie leaves Sonya "heartbroken", though he keeps the fact it is a sham a secret. Of the situation, Moloney said "Toadie is in love with Sonya, but he's had to give up the chance to follow his heart. Now we see that he really wants nothing more than to be able to tell her he loves her and that he wants to be with her – but he just can't." Toadie realises that Sonya still loves him when he notices she is still wearing the bracelet he gave her. Toadie becomes jealous of Sonya's new boyfriend David Foster (Ben Ridgwell). Sonya discovers that the wedding is a sham and the baby is not Toadie's. She agrees to wait for Toadie, but Steph's secret is revealed early and Sonya and Toadie decide to start their relationship over.

Callum wins tickets for a tropical cruise and he decides to give them to Toadie and Sonya. Toadie meets Eli Baker (P.J. Lane), Sonya's ex-boyfriend, on the trip. Eli brings "out an inferiority complex" in Toadie and he feels challenged by him. Toadie and Eli compete in a karaoke competition. The scenes for the cruise storyline were filmed in late August 2010, around Darling Harbour and on board the Pacific Jewel. The episodes marked only the second time Neighbours had filmed outside of Victoria. The actors and crew took five hours to shoot on and around the Pacific Jewel's running track and circus arena on the top deck. In February 2011, Morey revealed that she would like to see Toadie and Sonya have children together in the future. Toadie discovers that Sonya is Callum's mother and Morey explained that Toadie's reaction is one of devastation. Toadie has to ask Sonya if she ever loved him or was only with him to get Callum. Dieter Brummer joined the cast as Sonya's ex-boyfriend, Troy Miller in March 2011. Brummer told TV Week that Troy will cause waves between Sonya and Toadie.

=== Character reflection ===
In 2022, it was announced that Neighbours would be airing its final scenes on 28 July 2022. While talking to Shivani Dubey of Digital Spy, Moloney revealed that he had considered quitting the serial in the past. He admitted that he did not expect to be on the serial for 27 years and called each contract a "blessing". He continued, "There were times I thought about leaving, especially when I was growing up. My friends on the show came in, had a great time and then left for their adventure, either in the UK, US or Australia. I actually feel as though now I'm about to go on my adventure, and I get to see what else is going to happen from this point on. I'm really excited about it." When asked about his time on the serial, Moloney recalled of his casting, "I was just happy to have a job! I was a 15 year old kid and didn't really grasp the concept of it being anything more than that. I was just ready to turn up, have fun and go home."

=== Marriage to Terese Willis ===
Neighbours' return was announced in November 2022, with Moloney among the four longstanding cast members initially announced to be reprising their roles. When the series returned in September 2023, the first episode revealed that Toadie was marrying Terese Willis (Rebekah Elmaloglou), with their romance having developed off-screen after they both separated from their respective partners. Elmaloglou and Moloney were informed that their characters were to marry shortly before scripts were circulated to the cast. Following the episode's premiere, Herbison explained his decision to unite Toadie and Terese, highlighting the storyline's potential to re-engage viewers. Moloney further discussed his determination for the relationship to not be a "gimmick", highlighting the work he and Elmaloglou had done to create a believable couple. Moloney stated that he could see how Toadie and Terese could be right for each other, pointing out that "Toadie is always trying to save people, but for the first time ever he's got this powerful woman who he doesn't have to save at all, who is completely capable. So in that aspect he is just able to love her, have fun with her, lighten up and enjoy life. For Terese, she's always been with somebody who she can never trust or believe. So now she gets somebody who just genuinely loves her and she can trust." Elmaloglou expressed concern that fans would not accept Terese and Toadie as a couple, but asserted that they are "genuinely in love with each other and have got together in a beautiful way". She was also excited for the "challenge" of working closely with Moloney.

Problems emerge for Toadie and Terese's marriage after his ex-wife Melanie Pearson (Lucinda Cowden) confesses her love for him, which Toadie initially conceals from Terese. Jealous of the time Terese is spending with her ex-husband Paul Robinson (Stefan Dennis), Toadie gives into Melanie's continued advances and they have sex. Moloney stated his desire to tell the story in "a genuine and honest way", emphasising Toadie's continued issues with abandonment and revealing that he had attempted to play the character as "close to a mental breakdown" at this point. After spending time apart in the aftermath of his affair, Toadie and Terese begin to rebuild their relationship and agree that they both rushed into remarriage.

Moloney later discussed his desire to "split the audience" with the relationship, which he viewed as having been fulfilled, with further fan engagement encouraged by Mel's return and the increase in scenes between Terese and Paul.

=== Departure and guest returns ===
On 27 June 2024, Toadie's exit from the series was announced. In an Instagram video announcing his departure, Moloney disclosed that he had undertaken training as a director and had recently directed a Neighbours episode. Moloney disclosed that he had been considering leaving the role for "quite a long time", including prior to the show's cancellation in 2022, but had never felt able to decline each new contract when it was offered; he therefore felt "grateful" that the producers had not extended his role further. He also recognised that cutting his role would help secure the show's economic longevity, and described his retention on the show for so long as "the biggest gift of all". Herbison further explained that Toadie's exit was conceived out of consideration for "keep[ing] the production model fresh and sustainable" and "to keep viewers on their toes, while also progressing storylines in a natural way". He promised that "our long-term plans will become clearer in the fullness of time", and was also glad to be able to support Moloney's ambitions to train as a director. Toadie left the series on 25 September 2024, with guest appearances up to a total of five weeks expected to follow in subsequent months.

Moloney viewed the character's exit as an opportunity to tell a story focused on mental health, though felt that the focus on other characters' reactions over Toadie's state of mind prevented viewers from fully connecting with the story. Moloney's impression of Toadie's emotional state following the breakdown of his marriage to Mel influenced the development of the storyline. On-screen, Toadie encountered a series of reminders of his old home and previous marriages, leading him to feel conflicted. Toadie's mental health continued to be focused on in the build-up towards his exit, with Toadie hiding his growing insecurities from Terese and reacting angrily at her attempts of support.

In July 2024, the character was announced as being involved in the forthcoming "Death in the Outback" storyline, during which promotional material stated that one character would depart the series. While the guest character of Heath Royce (Ethan Panizza) was killed during the episode first shown on 22 August, Toadie and Mackenzie Hargreaves (Georgie Stone) were both also left in potentially fatal circumstances. After freeing himself and Mel from Heath's captivity, Toadie collapsed onto train tracks in the Outback and experienced visions of his five wives before passing out. Moloney described the possibility of Toadie dying in the Outback as "a pretty spectacular way to go".

Although Toadie survives the ordeal, Moloney described the character as "mentally gone" and accepting that he cannot fight any longer, influencing his subsequent decision to leave Erinsborough. Moloney approved of the "positive resolution" to the emotional storyline, a well as the "fun" of the farewell party in his departure episode.

Moloney reprised his role in late November 2024 for his first of multiple forthcoming guest stints. The storyline revolves around Toadie returning to Erinsborough for a visit, and asking if Nell could temporarily live with the Kennedys after his father Kevin Rebecchi was diagnosed with cancer and was set to die. Toadie later allows Nell to move in with Terese after she requests it for both of them. In an interview for Ramsay Street Revelations, Ayisha Salem-Towner, who plays Nell, reveals that after Moloney's exit, her future on the show was "a little bit uncertain for several months". She then went on to say that "The producers came up with the idea that Nell can stay with Terese, who can be her guardian." Toadie remains on screen for about 2 weeks, before going back to Colac with Hugo.

Another return for Toadie was confirmed in February for March 2025, which coincides with the show's 40th anniversary. Spoiler pictures released by Digital Spy reveal he will return in the episode broadcast on Thursday 13 March, and will share scenes with Nell, Terese, Paul and Nell's boyfriend JJ Varga-Murphy (Riley Bryant). He returned again on 1 May, to help Nell process her manslaughter of Sebastian Metcalfe (Rarmian Newton). He returned again on 1 September for Aaron's departure, and remained to support Nell following her breakup with JJ.

On 28 November 2025, it was confirmed that Moloney had been unavailable to return for the upcoming finale episodes, and had thus made his final appearance as Toadie.

== Storylines ==
Toadfish is a practical joker at school and he soon becomes close friends with Billy Kennedy. Toadie comes into conflict with Billy's father, Karl (Alan Fletcher) because of his behaviour and his mother Angie (Lesley Baker) later sends him to live with his aunt Coral (Denise Scott). A few months later, Toadie is sent back to Erinsborough and he decides to try to make a go of things at school. Toadie discovers that he has an above average IQ and is put into an accelerated learning class, but he keeps up his mischievous ways. Toadie becomes good friends with Hannah Martin (Rebecca Ritters) and Lance Wilkinson (Andrew Bibby). Toadie is horrified to learn that his mother and father plan to leave Erinsborough, so he and Billy convince Karl and Susan Kennedy (Jackie Woodburne) to let Toadie move in. Toadie passes his exams and studies law at Eden Hills University. He becomes a popular DJ on Uni FM, moves in with Lou Carpenter (Tom Oliver) and takes a job at Lou's Place. Toadie moves into Number 30 with Sarah Beaumont (Nicola Charles) and Joel Samuels (Daniel MacPherson). Toadie briefly becomes a guardian to his cousin, Tad (Jonathon Dutton). Toadie and Joel meet Dee Bliss (Madeleine West) and Vanessa Bradshaw (Julieanne Tait) on a night out. Dee later moves in with them.

Toadie is not happy when Geri Hallett (Isabella Dunwill) becomes his new Uni FM co-host and he plots to get her fired. His new co-host is Steph and Toadie develops feelings for her, but they decide to just be friends. Toadie is sacked from Uni FM, when he gives out some illegal advice. He is charged with inciting a crime and he decides to defend himself. Toadie becomes friends with law student Maggie Hancock (Sally Cooper) and she helps Toadie win his case. A romance develops between Toadie and Sheena Wilson (Zoe Stark), but when he tells her that her mother keeps coming onto him, Sheena breaks up with him. Toadie gets a job with a corporate law firm and becomes involved in Karl and Susan's divorce. He later works for Tim Collins (Ben Anderson). Toadie falls in love with Dee and the couple get engaged. Shortly after they wed, Toadie drives their car off a cliff into the sea and Dee goes missing, devastating Toadie. A while later, Toadie falls for Sindi Watts (Marisa Warrington) and they start dating. With his friend, Connor, Toadie becomes a wrestler. He meets Genevieve and they begin a relationship, but it ends when she goes on tour.

Toadie is left a bikini store by a client and he runs it with Connor. When Connor goes missing, Toadie believes he has been killed by Robert Robinson (Adam Hunter). Connor later sends Toadie some gifts and proves he is still alive. Toadie is shot in the back by Guy Sykes (Fletcher Humphrys) and he almost dies. Steph tells Toadie that she loves him, but she goes back to her husband. Toadie dates Abby Stafford (Louise Crawford), but their relationship ends when he realises that he is still in love with Steph. Toadie and Steph become a couple and they get engaged. However, on their wedding day, Toadie realises that Steph does not love him and he leaves her to go travelling. Toadie becomes Callum Jones's guardian after his grandmother is taken to hospital. Toadie briefly dates Callum's teacher, Kelly. Guy Sykes returns and holds Toadie and Callum hostage. Toadie helps Callum escape and wrestles Guy to the ground, before the police arrive. Toadie discovers that his dog Bob has cancer and he has him put to sleep. Bob's ashes are scattered at the lake.

Toadie gets Callum a new dog called Rocky and they train him to be a guide dog. During Rocky's training, Toadie and Callum are visited by Sonya Mitchell. Toadie asks her out, but she initially turns him down. Toadie and Elle Robinson (Pippa Black) believe Sonya and Lucas Fitzgerald (Scott Major) are seeing each other, but Sonya reveals she is his Gamblers Anonymous sponsor. Sonya and Toadie begin a relationship. Toadie agrees to help Steph cover up the fact she is pregnant with Daniel Fitzgerald's (Brett Tucker) baby. They tell their family and friends that they are back together and they decide to get married. Toadie eventually tells Sonya the truth and asks her to wait for him. Paul Robinson (Stefan Dennis) starts blackmailing Toadie and later reveals Steph's secret during a public event, devastating Dan's wife Libby Kennedy (Kym Valentine). Toadie falls out with Libby, while Karl and Susan tell Toadie that he is no longer part of the family. Callum also becomes angry with Toadie, but Sonya gets them talking again.

Toadie defends Steph when she is charged with the accidental death of Ringo Brown (Sam Clark), but she is sent to prison. Sonya moves in, as does her sister, Jade (Gemma Pranita), who clashes with Toadie. Callum tries to find his mother and realises that she is Sonya. Toadie asks her to leave and cuts off contact with her. Toadie calls Harold Bishop (Ian Smith) for help, while Lucas convinces Toadie that Sonya loves him. Callum's father, Troy Miller (Dieter Brummer), arrives and Toadie allows Callum and Troy to spend time together. Sonya and Toadie get back together. Troy turns nasty and punches Toadie, before Callum tells him to leave. Toadie takes a job with law firm Simmons & Colbert, so he and Sonya can get a loan to purchase the community gardens. Toadie begins representing The Hamilton Group, who want to build a new shopping complex in Erinsborough. Toadie is forced into relocating the development's car park or risk being fired by Peter Noonan (James Saunders).

Toadie offers Lucas, Lou and Kyle Canning (Chris Milligan) money for their businesses, so the car park can be built in their place. Lou accepts the offer on Kyle's behalf, while Lucas declines it. Peter start putting pressure on Toadie to get Lucas to sell. Lucas declines all of Toadie's offers and he blames the law firm for sabotaging his garage. When Lucas's apprentice, Chris Pappas (James Mason), is attacked, Toadie is questioned by the police and he realises that Peter is setting him up. Paul gives him an alibi, but the wrench Chris was attacked with is found in Toadie's car. Lewis Walton (Andy McPhee) is later arrested for attacking Chris, but he states that Toadie hired him. Toadie poses as Lewis' lawyer and when Lewis does not recognise him, the charges against him are dropped. Charlotte McKemmie (Meredith Penman) takes over Peter's job and informs Toadie that he is being let go from the law firm. However, after Toadie decides to sue for wrongful dismissal, he is given his job back.

Sonya and Toadie struggle to conceive a child and a fertility test shows that Toadie has a low sperm count. Toadie starts a health kick in a bid to increase his chances of conception, but test results indicate his count is still low. Toadie suggests they try IVF or a sperm donor, but Sonya tells him that she knows that it is not what he wants. Before donating blood at the hospital, Sonya takes a pregnancy test and learns that she is pregnant. Troy purchases Number 32 and makes it clear that he wants to be a part of Callum's life. He hires Toadie's friend Ajay Kapoor (Sachin Joab) to help him gain access. When Troy goads Toadie about Sonya and the baby, Toadie punches him and is later served with an intervention order. He is forced to leave the street. Sonya collapses from the stress, but she and the baby are fine. Troy drops the custody case when Callum agrees to spend time with him.

Troy holds Sonya and Jade hostage, but is injured during their escape. Toadie finds Troy unconscious on the floor, but when he returns with the paramedics, Troy is gone. He is later admitted to hospital, but he leaves early to go to the school to get Callum. Toadie finds them and tries to reason with Troy. When Callum tells him to go, Troy tries to drive away, but dies from a head injury. Toadie and Callum attend his funeral together. Toadie starts a Twitter account for the baby and tries to be Sonya's birthing coach as he feels left out of the pregnancy. When they learn they are having a daughter, Toadie and Sonya decide to name her Nell. Toadie's cousin, Georgia Brooks (Saskia Hampele), moves in and Connor turns up after six years. He and Toadie soon revert to their House of Trouser ways. Toadie proposes to Sonya and she accepts. Sonya gives birth to Nell (Scarlett Anderson) via caesarean section. She falls unconscious and has to undergo surgery, leaving Toadie and Callum to care for Nell on their own for a few days.

Despite believing his wedding is jinxed, Toadie and Sonya marry. However, during the reception a gas bottle explodes, causing the marquee to collapse and injure Sonya, who suffers amnesia. Her memories return when Toadie organises a vow renewal ceremony for them. Steph returns to Erinsborough following her release from prison. She refuses to forgive Toadie for botching her case, but later apologises to him when she is arrested again. Ajay and Toadie go into partnership together. When Sonya is threatened by Robbo Slade (Aaron Jakubenko), as she is the witness in his court case, Toadie tries to protect his wife. After Robbo spikes Toadie's drink, he wakes up the next morning with no memory of the night before. Robbo dies after being involved in a hit-and-run and Toadie is convinced he did it. However, Hudson Walsh (Remy Hii) admits that he was responsible for Robbo's death. Toadie and Sonya's marriage becomes strained when she starts spending less time at home with her family to help out other people, including single father Jacob Holmes (Clayton Watson), who kisses her.

Toadie hires Naomi Canning (Morgana O'Reilly) as his executive assistant. He is impressed when she brings in new business and offers her comfort when she reveals that she is being stalked. Callum gets a scholarship to a school in the United States and Toadie convinces Sonya to let him go. Naomi admits she has feelings for Toadie and kisses him. He realises that she has been manipulating him and Sonya, and fires her. Sonya and Toadie agree to cut back on their work, so that they can spend more time together as a couple. Toadie is hit by a car driven by Kathy Carpenter (Tina Bursill) and he suffers a fractured coccyx. Toadie receives a poison pen letter detailing Sonya's addictions. After he and the neighbours receive more letters, Toadie asks Mark Brennan (Scott McGregor) for his help in identifying the sender. It later emerges that Sonya's former best friend Erin Rogers (Adrienne Pickering) sent the letters, as she blames Sonya for introducing her to drugs. Sonya invites Erin to stay and her daughter Cat (Maleeka Gasbarri) visits. Cat bonds with Toadie and later asks to live with him and Sonya, but they help her to reconcile with her foster mother. Toadie helps Kyle out for the day, but accidentally causes a power outage.

While attending an open day for the new childcare centre, Toadie is injured when he tries to rescue Nell from a bouncy castle that is not anchored to the ground. He is unable to feel his legs and undergoes surgery to stabilise a T5 vertebra fracture. Karl informs Sonya that the surgeon was unable to remove the bullet that is still there and that Toadie may be paralysed. Angie returns to help out. Toadie struggles to accept his condition and the fact that he will have to use a wheelchair. After learning that his clients are leaving him, Toadie considers suing Naomi for compensation, but decides against it. On his return home, Toadie's confidence is knocked when Nell refuses to hug him, as she is scared of his wheelchair. In a bid to prove to Sonya that he can cope without her, Toadie looks after Nell alone, but he is unable to go after her when she runs outside and is almost hit by Sonya's car. Toadie's brother Stonefish visits to offer his support, and he encourages Toadie to attend a benefit in his honour. Steph returns, trying to rebuild her life, and she and Toadie make a pact to support each other. Toadie has surgery to remove the bullet from his spine, which he hopes will enable him to walk again. Belinda Bell (Nikki Shiels) threatens Toadie, as she believes he reported her relationship with Steph to the hospital board. Sonya interrupts Toadie's operation, fearing Belinda will sabotage it, causing a complication that leaves Toadie unable to have more children.

After he is discharged, Sonya asks Belinda to assist Toadie's rehabilitation, and he begins walking again. Sonya tells Toadie that she hired Belinda because she was worried about his bond with Steph, causing a brief rift in their marriage. Toadie is trapped inside Lassiter's following a boiler explosion, but is later rescued. Toadie tries to keep Sonya's uncle Walter (Greg Stone) from meeting her, as he is not yet sober. However, Walter arrives in town and they are reunited. Steph tries to persuade Toadie to represent Paul in his trial for the Lassiter's explosion, but he only agrees to do it if Paul pleads guilty. Toadie is shocked when Sonya suggests that she act as a surrogate for Steph and Mark, as Steph cannot cope with a pregnancy on account of her mental health problems. He agrees to talk to the couple about the idea, but is relieved when they reject it. He starts looking into ways of him and Sonya having another baby, but his plans are thrown when Steph and Mark change their mind. Toadie gets back on board with the plan again, realising Nell is enough for him and Sonya. Stonie sends Toadie a photo he took of a woman that looks like Dee, leaving Toadie to wonder if she is still alive. He contemplates hiring a private investigator to look into her disappearance. Sonya announces she is pregnant with Mark's child.

Andrea Somers (West), masquerading as Dee, shows up at Number 30, and explains how she survived the car crash. Toadie helps Andrea with a claim on Dee's family estate. She later claims that she was pregnant at the time of the car accident and introduces Toadie to her daughter Willow (Mieke Billing-Smith). Toadie bonds with Willow and helps her gain entry to a private school. He struggles with his feelings for Dee, and Sonya's closeness with Mark. Toadie hands over a bankers draft for $100,000 to Andrea, and he later finds that she and Willow have left town for London. With Sonya's blessing, Toadie goes to London to find them. When Toadie calls home, Nell answers the phone and tells him Sonya is in bed with Mark. He assumes that Sonya has cheated on him and confronts her during a video call. He fails to close the call properly, and when Andrea comes to his room to talk, Sonya sees them have sex. While Andrea is in the shower, Toadie finds her passport with her real name on it. She soon admits that she is not Dee, but she does love him. Toadie rejects her and quickly leaves the hotel. Willow tries to talk to him, but he walks into the road and is hit by a taxi. At the hospital, Karl visits him and reveals that Sonya has had a miscarriage and that she saw him have sex with Andrea.

Upon his return to Erinsborough, he misses the memorial for Caitlin and rushes to see Sonya. Consumed by her grief, Sonya resolves to end their marriage and Toadie moves in with Shane and his family. Toadie vows to salvage his marriage and is devastated when a broken Sonya relapses. Angie urges him to fight Sonya for custody of Nell, but he refuses and brings Callum back to Australia in an attempt to pull Sonya back on track. She eventually agrees to return home and things improve between her and Toadie. Willow briefly returns to Erinsborough and Toadie forgives her for her part in Andrea's scheme. He helps her reconnect with her biological father and she moves away. Sonya urges Toadie to work through his grief for Dee and he begins seeing a psychologist, Sam Feldman (Alex Tsitsopoulos). He later learns Sam is a former boyfriend of Sonya and becomes jealous of their rekindled friendship. The situation makes Sonya realise she loves Toadie and they finally reconcile; he moves back into No.30 and they renew their wedding vows. Months after their reunion, Sonya convinces Toadie to hire a private detective to find Andrea and reclaim their missing $100,000. Willow urges them to stay away from Andrea; it later transpires that Toadie's one-night stand with Andrea resulted in her falling pregnant. Sindi Watts arrives in Erinsborough with Toadie and Andrea's six-month-old son, Hugo Somers (John Turner). While Toadie is quickly smitten with Hugo, Sonya struggles with the idea of raising Andrea's child, and she later tracks Andrea to a psychiatric facility in Hobart. Toadie visits Andrea, who is delusional and believes she is Dee. Sonya commits to raising Hugo and the Rebecchis agree to pay for Andrea's care on the condition she has no contact with them.

Toadie and Sonya struggle to raise Nell and Hugo alongside running their businesses and hire Alice Wells (Kerry Armstrong) as their live-in nanny. Sonya begins behaving strangely and Toadie worries that she may have relapsed. She later disappears, but it conspires that Alice – whose real name is Heather Schilling and is Andrea's biological mother – has been drugging Sonya with strong painkillers and has poisoned her. With the help of Willow, Toadie finds Sonya at the roadside and rushes her to hospital. Sonya is discharged but remains in pain for several weeks. She collapses and tests reveal she has stage four ovarian cancer. Toadie is devastated and supports his wife as she begins intensive chemotherapy. Sonya visits Andrea and convinces her to give Toadie full custody of Hugo. Sonya's cancer becomes public knowledge and both Callum and Jade return to Erinsborough to support the family. However, Sonya's health deteriorates rapidly and she dies in Toadie's arms during a visit to the beach. After Sonya's memorial, Toadie decides to take Nell and Hugo overseas, staying close to Callum as they work through their grief.

When Toadie returns, he is unhappy to learn that Finn Kelly (Rob Mills), who had poisoned Nell two years earlier, is now living with the Kennedys, and that Imogen Willis (Ariel Kaplan) has been defending him. He initially distances himself from the Kennedys, but they later reconcile. Toadie later defends Finn when he is accused of assaulting an obsessed fan. A few months later, he discovers that Andrea believes that Dee may still be alive. After reluctantly accepting offers from Karl to put Andrea and Heather under hypnosis, he decides to try and track down a "Karen" whom they claim to be Dee. Dee later returns to Ramsay Street after Andrea attempts to kill her and she is rescued by Heather. She reveals to Toadie that she has been living in Byron Bay and had been targeted by a criminal group called the Zantucks who mistook her for Andrea and tampered with their wedding car. It is later revealed that Dee was adopted, and is Andrea's twin and Heather's daughter. After realising it is too soon to move on from Sonya, he and Dee say their goodbyes.

Toadie later helps his niece Kirsha Rebecchi (Vani Dhir) as she applies to attend a special school in Sydney. This angers Shane and his wife Dipi (Sharon Johal) but they later reconcile. The following year, Toadie struggles as Sonya's first anniversary is approaching, unsure of how to commemorate her. When Roxy Willis (Zima Anderson) inadvertently wears Sonya's wedding dress to the Lassiter's Wedding Expo, he lashes out at her though later apologises. Sometime later, he agrees to accompany Finn to Pierce Greyson's (Tim Robards) island for Elly Conway's (Jodi Anasta) birthday celebrations. Toadie is stunned when Finn tells her that Elly's sister Bea Nilsson (Bonnie Anderson) has returned to Sydney on the islanders' dinghy. As he prepares to leave, he discovers the dinghy hidden in some bushes. He informs Finn, who attacks him, reveals that he attempted to kill Bea as he did not want a relationship with her anymore, and pushes Toadie out to sea after puncturing the bottom of the dinghy and placing his body in it. Paul later rescues Toadie, and they are briefly held hostage by Harry Sinclair (Paul Dawber). After learning what Finn did to Toadie and spotting the island on fire, Harry allows him and Paul to go to the island and rescue the others on the island.

Dee later returns to Ramsay Street after Andrea insists on meeting with her again. She and Toadie decide to recommence their relationship. However, Elly, who has been wrongly imprisoned for killing Finn and is Andrea's cellmate, warns them that Andrea is attempting to gain custody of Hugo by connecting with Dee. Dee supports Toadie as he attempts to appeal Elly's sentence. However, their relationship falls apart after Dee decides to connect with Heather despite Toadie's warnings and Toadie refusing to allow it. They later break up. On another visit to the prison, Andrea and Owen Campbell (Johnny Ruffo) drug and attack Dee, allowing for Andrea to escape and kidnap Hugo pretending to be Dee. Heather later traps Andrea at Erinsborough High, and she is arrested. Although grateful towards Heather for helping him, Toadie remains angry at her and Dee for being part of the reason Andrea escaped and, despite Shane and Dipi attempting to convince him to talk to her, he refuses to see Dee. A private investigator tracks down Dee's biological father Peter Wilson, who is living in Alaska, and Toadie informs Dee of Peter's whereabouts and that he has lung cancer. With Heather having a prison transfer due to Toadie and Andrea's anger at her, Dee decides to leave and meet Peter in Alaska after reconciling with Toadie.

Toadie begins a casual relationship with his personal assistant, Melanie Pearson (Lucinda Cowden), which later becomes serious, and the two ultimately marry. The couple plan to leave Ramsay Street after their wedding, but are convinced to stay by a series of video messages from past residents of the street. However, within two years, Mel has left Toadie and fled Erinsborough, after which he discovers a surprising romantic connection with his long-time neighbour Terese Willis (Rebekah Elmaloglou), who has also split up with Paul. Ignoring concerns that they are rushing their relationship, Terese and Toadie quickly marry, and Toadie moves into Terese's family home with Nell and Hugo. Two months after the wedding, Mel returns and reveals that she abandoned the family due to her becoming embroiled in blackmail threats and ultimately the apparent death of Krista Sinclair (Majella Davis), while Paul jilted Terese due to the same circumstances. Although Toadie initially remains determined to move on with Terese, the marriage is destabilised by the revelations and Toadie eventually has sex with Mel. When Terese discovers his betrayal, she ends the relationship but later agrees to work on their marriage.

Toadie experiences a series of reminders of Dee and Sonya, leaving him confused about his relationship history. He confides in Karl but refuses to tell Terese, resulting in moments of anger towards her. After an aggressive outburst towards Terese, Toadie impulsively pursues Heath Royce (Ethan Panizza) with Mel when he hears that Heath may present a danger towards Karl's daughter, Holly Hoyland (Lucinda Armstrong Hall). Toadie and Mel are kidnapped and transported to the Outback, where Holly finds and frees them. Toadie looks for help and is separated from Mel and Holly. He eventually collapses onto a set of train tracks as night falls, experiencing visions of his former wives as he loses consciousness. He is rescued the following day, and after returning home ends his relationship with Terese. Experiencing how difficult Terese finds being around him in the wake of their separation, Toadie decides it is best for everyone if he moves closer to his family in Colac. Nell, having recently begun a relationship with JJ Varga-Murphy (Riley Bryant), objects to his plans, but after Toadie explains his fears of her repeating Sonya's mistakes she relents and agrees to move with the family. Terese declines to attend Toadie's leaving party, but ultimately relents and wishes him well before he leaves with Nell and Hugo.

Several months later, Toadie returns to Erinsborough and meets Terese at Harolds cafe, where he reveals that his father had been diagnosed with cancer and only has a few months left. He later spots Nell in the complex, who is visiting JJ behind his back. Toadie finds out about Terese's recent relapse, and that she convinced Nell to hide it. He asks Susan if Nell can live with her and Karl for a while. Toadie explains to Nell that she can move back to Erinsborough for a while during big Kev's cancer, but will not be able to live with Terese. Toadie and Paul help Terese convince the residents of Eirene Rising to allow her to come back and work there, and they manage to convince them to reinstall her as manager. Toadie celebrates Nell's birthday at Terese's house with Hugo, before he receives a call from the Erinsborough city council that they will not be renewing the building for the Sonya Rebecchi foundation. Paul allows them to move the foundation to Lassitters. Toadie ultimately allows Nell to move in with Terese, and he leaves Erinsborough with Hugo. Toadie later returns and Terese asks if Paul can move in with her and Nell, but he is firmly against the idea. He later warms to it, instead allowing Nell and Terese to move into Paul's penthouse. He attends Nell's art exhibition in the Lassiters complex and Krista and Leo Tanaka's (Tim Kano) wedding, where he catches up with Melanie. He later returns again after Nell reveals she accidentally killed Sebastian Metcalfe (Rarmian Newton), and makes sure she is ok. Months later, he again returns to Erinsborough for the farewell party of Aaron Brennan (Matt Wilson) and Rhett Norman (Liam Maguire). Terese vents to him about her concerns over Elle Robinson's (Elise Jansen) return to the street.

== Reception ==
"Who could be a better friend and neighbour than "Toadfish" Rebecchi? Since 1995 he's been a great comrade and a veritable rock to Bill, to Joel, to Sarah, to Amy, to Lance, to Drew ... Toadie has been the very incarnation of the listening ear and the supportive hand. The writers rewarded him by having the lovely Dee become his girlfriend. While Toadie is physically no great bargain, glamorous Dee confesses that it is his integrity and capacity for loyal friendship that attracts her."

— The Age's Chris Middendorp on Toadie (2002)

For his portrayal of Toadie, Moloney was nominated for a Rose d'Or award for Best Actor in a Soap in 2004. In 2010, Moloney won the very first Best Daytime Star award at the Inside Soap Awards. Moloney won the award for a second and third time in 2011 and 2012 respectively. He was nominated in the same category at the 2017 Inside Soap Awards. He progressed to the viewer-voted shortlist, but lost out to Lorna Laidlaw, who portrays Mrs Tembe on Doctors. In 2019, Moloney received a nomination for the Logie Award for Most Popular Actor, and he won the Inside Soap Best Daytime Star Award for a fourth time. He won the same award in 2024 shortly after leaving the serial.

In 2008, men's magazine Zoo Weekly placed Toadie on their annual Top 50 People We Hate List. Zoo editor Paul Merrill said "Toadie has just been on the show for too long, he's not a great character and we wish he wasn't on the show." Though, in a survey carried out by Yahoo! to find viewers favourite Neighbours character of all time, Toadie came joint second with Harold Bishop with 15 per cent of the votes. Stephen Moynihan writing for The Age said Toadie is one of the "most enduring and popular characters" in Neighbours.

The Herald Sun's Siobhan Duck included Toadie and Dee's wedding day tragedy on a list of "Top 6 Neighbours moments". Whilst Duck's colleague Darren Devlyn said it was one of Neighbours' most memorable weddings. Herald Sun readers also voted the wedding as the third "most memorable" moment in Neighbours' history. Daniel Kilkelly and Ryan Love of Digital Spy also shared Devlyn's sentiment. They said the wedding caused "a whole flood" of tears to the eye and said the ceremony was like a "fairytale". They concluded "as for Toadie, his luck when it came to weddings never did get any better…"

In 2010, to celebrate Neighbours' 25th anniversary Sky, a British satellite broadcasting company profiled 25 characters of which they believed were the most memorable in the series' history. Toadie is in the list and describing him they state: "Toadie – or Jarrod, to his bogan mother – has taken the mantle from Harold of looking after the Ramsay Street flock, ending his time as the errant child of the Street. After all, he entered the show as a bad influence on pretty boy Billy Kennedy, and there was that weird period when he ran a bikini store, Bounce, with House of Trouser co-member Connor. There's something a little Ian Beale about the character – he's slightly annoying, it's difficult to care about his plots and you dread the day he's going to attempt a sex scene, but the show just wouldn't work without him." They also describe his most memorable scenes as the death of his wife Dee; looking after Callum; on-off relationship with Steph. Holy Soap also described Dee's death scenes as his most memorable. Roz Laws of the Sunday Mercury said Toadie and Callum shared an "unlikely love" for wrestling. She also wondered if he was actually up to the challenge of looking after Callum full-time.

Natalie Craig writing for The Sydney Morning Herald said Toadie was always destined for greatness. She said as a teenager he was a "major ratbag with a major mullet to match", but a genius at the same time. Craig opined many "memorable Toadie moments" occurred when he shared his home. She cited her favourite ever scene as being one in which Toadie, Joel and Lance had a stand-off over the washing up. Toadie was placed at number six on the Huffpost's "35 greatest Neighbours characters of all time" feature. Journalist Adam Beresford described him as an "Aussie everyman" with a "disastrous" love life; adding he is a "prime example" of the joy long-term featured characters give viewers. Beresford described his transformation from "class clown" to lawyer after he "ditched the Hawaiian shirts and the greasy ponytail." The critic concluded that Toadie "earned his place among the Neighbours greats." In 2022, Kate Randall from Heat included Toadie in the magazine's top ten Neighbours characters of all time feature. Randall opined that Toadie had "come a long way" to become a lawyer. She described him as once being a "ratbag with long hair and loud Hawaiian shirts." She added that Toadie and Stonefish "wreaked havoc" on Ramsay Street. Toadie was placed first in a poll ran via soap fansite "Back To The Bay", which asked readers to determine the top ten most popular Neighbours characters. In response the Daily Mirror's Susan Knox assessed that Toadie "has faced endless trials and tribulations".

In an Irish Independent feature profiling "the top 12 Neighbours icons", Sheena McGinley titled Toadie as the most iconic. McGinley assessed that "Toadie's been many things — cheeky, caring, seemingly gifted in the bedroom department, a lawyer, and a dad." She continued to list his many stories but noted his comic persona. McGinley concluded that his comedy "is why he's the most multi-faceted, relatable character to ever grace the street." Lorna White from Yours profiled the magazine's "favourite Neighbours characters of all time". Toadie was included in the list and White stated that he had "become a hugely popular character in the series." A reporter from The Scotsman included Toadie and Sonya's wedding day explosion as one of the show's top five moments in its entire history. Toadie and Dee's wedding was placed at number five in a feature compiled for The Guardian, celebrating the show's most memorable moments. Critic Sam Strutt also likened Dee and Toadie's romance to the tale of the Beauty and the Beast. Chloe Timms from Inside Soap agreed with the assumption Toadie and Terese's marriage was doomed. She called for the return of "fun Toadie" instead of his marital woes. In 2015, a Herald Sun reporter included Toadie having his mullet cut off, Toadie and Dee's wedding disaster and Toadie and Sonya's pregnancy storylines in their "Neighbours' 30 most memorable moments" feature.
