= Matt Hancock (Neighbours) =

Character in TV soap

- Neighbours character
- Portrayed by: Stephen Hunt
- Duration: 2001–2002, 2005
- First appearance: 26 March 2001
- Last appearance: 27 July 2005
- Introduced by: Stanley Walsh (2001); Ric Pellizzeri (2005)
In-universe information
- Occupation: Barman; Elvis impersonator Moco employee Businessman
- Father: Evan Hancock
- Mother: Genevieve Murdoch
- Stepfather: Roger Murdoch
- Stepmother: Maggie Hancock
- Brothers: Chris Hancock
- Half-brothers: Leo Hancock
- Half-sisters: Francesca Hancock; Emily Hancock

Matthew "Matt" Hancock is a fictional character from the Australian soap opera Neighbours, played by Stephen Hunt. He made his first on screen appearance on 26 March 2001 and departed on 9 May 2002. In 2005, Hunt reprised his role as Matt for the show's 20th anniversary episode.

== Creation and casting ==
In early 2001, the Neighbours scriptwriters decided to introduce some "new blood" to the show to fill the void left by the temporary departures of six regular characters. The writers created and introduced the five strong Hancock family, with eldest son Matthew, or "Matt", becoming the first member to arrive, shortly after the departure of Lance Wilkinson (Andrew Bibby). Swimmer and actor Stephen Hunt was cast as Matt. His friend and fellow Neighbours actor Daniel McPherson (Joel Samuels) helped him start his acting career and secure the role of Matt when the role came up. Neighbours marked Hunt's first television role and the actor relocated from Sydney to Melbourne for filming. Of joining the cast, he stated "Neighbours is a fantastic opportunity and I want to make a really good go of it. I was quite ready for something different in my life and I was thrilled when I got the part." He said the job had been "a huge learning curve", but he was enjoying it. Hunt made his debut as Matt on 26 March 2001.

In 2002, the entire Hancock family were written out of Neighbours. A writer for the Herald Sun said Hunt was disappointed with the decision as he thought the family had great on screen chemistry. Hunt explained "The producers decided to write the whole family out, which we were all unhappy about. It was disappointing for me because I thought there was so much more they could do with my character. But they turned him into the loser of the street." In April 2005, Kris Green of Digital Spy reported Hunt would be reprising his role of Matt for Neighbours' 20th anniversary episode, which was broadcast in July of that year.

== Development ==
Upon his entrance, Matt was said to be nineteen and the oldest boy in the Hancock family. He has a brother called Chris and half-siblings Leo (Anthony Hammer) and Emily (Isabella Oldham). Matt has a good relationship with his father, Evan (Nicholas Opolski), but not with his mother, Genevieve (Julie Campbell). He gets along well with his step-mother, Maggie (Sally Cooper), and sees her as "a good mate." Of Matt, a writer for the BBC's Neighbours website commented "As the eldest in the family Matt saw himself as playing a very adult role in their household. He was keen to take on all the attributes of adulthood, but not so ready to accept all the responsibilities." His parents wanted him to go to university, where he had been accepted onto an Arts course, but Matt decided to defer for a year. James Joyce of The Newcastle Herald said Matt was intelligent, but had trouble applying himself to study. He added "Apparently, 'his parents despair about his future but are secretly proud of his handsome looks and wit'. They are indeed blessed." Hunt also stated that his character was "a very intelligent and skilled sort of guy, but he can be quite cocky. He likes to muck around with people."

Hunt said that Matt becomes "quite obsessed" with Dee Bliss (Madeleine West) when he arrives in Ramsay Street. Matt finds employment at Lou's Place. A reporter for the official Neighbours website wrote that Matt often received attention from girls, but "he lacks the maturity to keep up with most of them." Matt becomes good friends with Felicity Scully (Holly Valance) and dates Laura Wallace (Fiona Choi). When Matt learns Laura is an exotic dancer, he is shocked by her occupation.

When the serial's scriptwriters noticed that there was a physical resemblance between Hunt and a young Elvis Presley, they decided to give his character a storyline in which he became an Elvis impersonator. Matt accepts a job as an Elvis impersonator and uses the job to get closer to Felicity. Hunt told a TV Week columnist, "Matt has developed a crush on Flick, but he hasn't made a move because she's going out with Joel Samuels (Daniel MacPherson)." The actor explained that Matt gets stage fright and realises that he can only perform if Felicity is around, luckily for him she agrees to help him out. Hunt commented that he was unsure if he could watch the scenes where Matt attempts to do one of Elvis' pelvic thrusts, calling them "a bit embarrassing".

Matt borrows some money to purchase a sports car and he later struggles with "crippling debt". Matt then becomes involved in illegal drag racing to raise some money. Hunt explained "Matt is in a lot of financial trouble. To make money, he's been drag racing against a guy named Glen Bushby (Nathaniel Marshall). So far the races have been small, but each time the stakes have risen so there is a lot riding on this final race. Matt knows it's dangerous - and against the law - but he's so desperate he goes through with it." Matt's brother, Leo, learns about the race and is excited for his older brother. Hunt stated that Leo idolises Matt and manages to convince him into letting him come along and watch. However, just as the race begins, Leo jumps in the car. The cars reach "dangerously high speeds" and Leo presence distracts Matt, who loses control of his car. Hunt revealed that everything then happens quickly - Matt hits Glen, who crashes. He then collides with Harold Bishop (Ian Smith) and hits a tree. The actor commented that the next thing Matt knows, he and Leo are waking up in hospital with minor injuries. Matt learns Harold has been blinded and Glen is in a coma. He also realises that if Glen dies, he will be facing manslaughter charges. The accident strains the already fragile relationship between Matt and his father and knowing that a court case will be costly, Matt packs his bags and leaves.

Matt returns and the charges against him are reduced with the help of an expensive barrister. Hunt told Inside Soap's Jason Herbison "The barrister manages to talk Matt's part down, which means he probably won't go to jail. But his court date is still four months away, and the family have to keep paying the barrister - which puts them under even more financial pressure." The Hancock family sell their house to Malcolm Kennedy (Benjamin McNair) to fund the legal fees and they then decide to go. Matt and Evan manage to resolve their issues in "a touching family scene". Matt thanks his father for standing by him and Evan tells his son that he will always be there for him. During his court case, Matt is fined, rather than handed a prison sentence. The BBC writer opined that the whole experience matured Matt greatly. The Hancock family then say goodbye to their friends and neighbours and leave.

== Storylines ==
Matt goes to Lou's Place looking for a job as a barman. Lou Carpenter (Tom Oliver) is reluctant to hire Matt at first, but agrees to give him a trial. Matt and his family move into Ramsay Street. Matt tries to flirt with Dee Bliss, but she is not impressed when she learns he is only nineteen. Matt befriends her housemate, Toadfish Rebecchi (Ryan Moloney). Matt starts dating Laura Wallace and he pretends he lives alone. However, he is forced to admit he still lives with his parents after Laura spots his sister's toys. Laura tells Matt she is a stripper and that many of her previous boyfriends had issues with her job. Matt tries to pretend he is comfortable with Laura's job, but it soon becomes evident he is not when he punches an audience member at one of Laura's shows. Laura is fired and she and Matt break up.

Laura gets Matt a job as an Elvis impersonator and he asks Felicity Scully to be his Priscilla Presley for the shows. After the two share a hug, Matt begins to fall for her. After scoring a job at Moco with Flick's older sister Steph (Carla Bonner), Matt continues the Elvis gigs. Steph eventually fires Matt after he proves unreliable. Matt helps Evan and Susan Kennedy (Jackie Woodburne) chaperon the Year 12 camping trip. Tad Reeves (Jonathon Dutton) smuggles in a bottle of whiskey and shares it with the other teens. Matt catches them, but is persuaded not to tell Susan. Tad is later bitten by a scorpion and Matt admits to Susan that the teens were drinking. While stocking the pub cellar, Matt and Flick are trapped inside. Flick immediately accuses Matt of planning it and confronts him about his feelings for her. Flick apologises and tells Matt she likes him only as a friend.

Matt purchases a car and starts spending a lot of time on it. Glen Bushby challenges him to a drag race, but Matt's car stalls and he loses. Matt receives a letter demanding he pays $400 within two days or his car will be repossessed. Matt challenges Glen to another race and Stuart Parker (Blair McDonough) puts down a bet of $500. Matt defeats Glen and is able to meet his payments. Matt overhears Toadie confessing his feelings for Maggie and things become strained between the friends. When his debts begins to mount up, Matt agrees to another drag race, this time for higher stakes. Leo joins Matt for the race and they take the lead. However, Matt swerves out of control and hits Harold Bishop who is out power walking. Both cars crash and the drivers are seriously injured. Harold is left temporarily blind due to detached retinas.

Matt wakes up in hospital and confesses all to Evan and Maggie. He is interviewed by Terri Hall (Robyn Charlesworth) who tells him he will be charged with reckless driving and potentially manslaughter if Glen dies. When the realisation sinks in that he may be going to prison and he sees a priest enter Glen's room, Matt flees the hospital and hides in a shack by the beach. Leo finds and visits Matt who begs him to stay quiet. After Terri follows Leo and tracks down Matt, he is arrested and denied bail. Evan and Maggie bail him out and Matt returns home. He is confronted by Glen's father, Roger (D.J. Foster), who angrily informs him that Glen may never walk again as a result of his injuries. Evan quickly defends Matt and the tension between them eases.

Matt's sentence is a fine instead of prison. This, and the legal fees, bankrupt the family and they are forced to sell their house. Matt visits Harold and apologises, which Harold accepts. Matt appears in Annalise Hartman's (Kimberly Davies) documentary about Ramsay Street. He has become a businessman and he explains that the reason he liked Ramsay Street was everything was so laid back. He adds that Lou's pub was the only place to go and that it is no wonder it was burned down.

== Reception ==
In June 2002, Matt came sixth in a poll run by Newsround to find viewer's favourite Neighbours character. He received 2.34% of the vote. A writer for Newsround called Matt a "heart-throb", while James Joyce of The Newcastle Herald branded him a "pin-up." While reviewing the Hancock family's first episode, Jackie Brygel of the Herald Sun said Matt was "hunky (of course)" and quipped "who said the Robinsons could never be replaced?" The BBC said Matt's most notable moment was "His participation in an illegal drag race which saw him injure Harold, himself and Leo." Tom Adair of The Scotsman was not a fan of the Hancock family and cheered their departures. He described them as "boring, whinging, plot-clogging, wastes of space".
