= Tess Bell =

- Neighbours character
- Portrayed by: Krista Vendy
- Duration: 1999–2001, 2023, 2025
- First appearance: 17 September 1999
- Last appearance: 17 June 2025
- Introduced by: Stanley Walsh (1999); Jason Herbison (2023, 2025)
In-universe information
- Occupation: Teacher
- Husband: Brendan Bell; Darcy Tyler

Teresa "Tess" Bell is a fictional character from the Australian soap opera Neighbours, played by Krista Vendy. She made her first appearance during the episode broadcast on 17 September 1999 and departed on 18 September 2001. Vendy reprised the role in 2023 and appeared again from 13 May 2025 until 17 June 2025.

== Creation and casting ==
Vendy originally auditioned for the role of Sarah Beaumont, but Nicola Charles was cast instead. Three years later, Vendy auditioned for another role in Neighbours through her agency. Vendy auditioned three times in total and she revealed she was one of three girls up for the role. The actress told the official Neighbours website she learnt she had won the part of Teresa six months later. Of her reaction to the news, Vendy said "I'd put it out of my mind until one night when I got a call from my manager, Scott. He called me all the way from the UK to say 'congratulations, you've got the part'. It was a dream come true for me because I've been trying to get into acting for such a long time."

Vendy told Jason Herbison from Inside Soap that her character had originally been "a barmaid called Tamsin Flynn", but after she was cast, the producers looked at her audition again and changed the character's name and occupation. Vendy said Tamsin was supposed to be a surfer and a party girl, but when the character became Teresa she was changed into a "strait-laced schoolteacher" instead. Vendy revealed her cousin, Kristian Schmid (who played Todd Landers in the show), gave her some advice before she entered the show. The actress said "Kristian told me to always think about the motivation of other characters as well as my own." Vendy filmed her first scenes on location at the Erinsborough High set. Two months after her on screen debut, Gina Leros of The Sun-Herald said Vendy would be the one to watch in Neighbours in 2000. In July 2000, Vendy's contract was renewed for two years, with an option for another 12 months. Vendy called it "fantastic", as she had finally begun to "flesh out" her character and no longer felt nervous on set.

== Development ==
=== Characterisation ===
Teresa was introduced as a 24-year-old, married English teacher. She moved to Erinsborough to regain her independence and found employment at the local high school. Vendy said Teresa prefers to be called Tess and she described her character as a "perfectionist", especially when it came to teaching and cleaning. Vendy said while she is not a "cleaning freak" like Tess, she does share the same work ethic as her. The actress revealed Tess has a vivacious side to her and she has been married to her husband for a couple of years. Vendy told an Inside Soap columnist that she was glad her character had more depth than a bimbo and she said Tess is nothing like the person she thought she would be playing. When asked if it felt strange to be playing a married school teacher, Vendy said "Yeah! It is weird because in real life, I have no desire to get married whatsoever! Tess has many more responsibilities than Krista, so it has been interesting to play someone like her." A writer from the official Neighbours website called Tess "headstrong and intelligent."

=== Marriage to Brendan Bell ===
Shortly after her arrival, Tess makes the decision to leave her violent husband, Brendan (Blair Venn). Vendy said Brendan had been physically and mentally abusing Tess and she was desperate to get away from him. The Kennedy family suspect Brendan has been hitting his wife when they notice a scratch on Tess' face. They ask her to move in with them and Tess opens up about Brendan and his behaviour. Of her character's marriage to Brendan, Vendy explained "Tess is a very strong woman, but she has lost a lot of her confidence during the abusive marriage. She is only 24 years old and she looks up to Brendan because he is 11 years her senior and is a successful lawyer. Sadly, he only sees her as a trophy." A writer for Inside Soap said Neighbours rarely strayed from its formula of light-hearted story lines, so when the producers decided to tackle the issue of domestic violence they made sure it would be handled realistically and sensitively. Vendy said to get her head around what Tess was going through, she researched domestic violence and made sure the story line was dealt with carefully.

Brendan comes to Ramsay Street to see Tess and he tries talking his way back into her affections. Vendy said despite Brendan's past behaviour, Tess wants her marriage to work and her stubbornness keeps her going back for more. The actress explained "She doesn't want to be seen as a failure, or to think she has failed herself. She believes Brendan when he says that he has changed, because she wants to believe him. She doesn't see any of the warning signs." Tess' friends, Stephanie Scully (Carla Bonner) and Susan Kennedy (Jackie Woodburne), become alarmed when they learn Tess has allowed Brendan back into her life and they try to warn her about him. However, this just makes Tess want to be with him more and Vendy said Tess and Steph fall out over the situation. Teresa believes Brendan has changed, but she is unaware he has turned on a few people and has shown a split personality. The actress revealed she had received positive reactions about the storyline from viewers.

=== Daniel Fitzgerald ===
Tess develops a crush on her housemate Daniel Fitzgerald (Brett Tucker) and when she learns he has asked Steph out on a date, she is "crestfallen". It does not stop her pining for him and even though Dan and Steph fail to hit it off, Tess finds it difficult to live with Dan and she decides to move out. Vendy told Inside Soap's' Jason Herbison that Tess talks to Steph about her feelings and she is told that living with Dan is unhealthy when there is unresolved tension. Tess takes Steph's advice because she does not think Dan will ever see her as more than a friend. She chooses to move out as it is the easiest option. Vendy revealed "Tess suggests that Daniel takes over the lease on his own. He is totally shocked by this, and asks her why she wants to move out. Finally, Tess admits that she likes him more than a friend, and that it's hard for her to live under the same roof knowing he doesn't feel the same way."

However, Dan then admits he is also likes her. He explains that he has always been attracted to her, but did not do anything about it as it was not long since Brendan died. Herbison stated "one might expect this mutual admission to lead to romance", but Vendy thought it was not as simple as that. She said that the moment had passed and Tess and Dan had crossed the boundary into friendship and had become too familiar with each other. Dan then makes the decision to move out, saying that if they are to have a chance, they will need some space. Herbison quipped "With both Tess and Dan employed as teachers at Erinsborough High, there would seem to be plenty of opportunities for them to get together in the future." Vendy was unsure if the story line would continue as Tucker was not a regular cast member. But she added that it was nice to see Tess so happy while it lasted.

=== Affair with Darcy Tyler ===
Tess began an affair with Darcy Tyler (Mark Raffety) in 2001, despite the fact that he was dating her best friend Dee Bliss (Madeleine West). Vendy explained that Tess was "a sucker" when it came to men and her attraction to Darcy was so strong, that she could not see anything else. Tess believed everything he said, so when Darcy tried to reassure her that he was going to break up with Dee, she does not doubt him. Teresa eventually decided to tell Dee what was going on. Vendy stated "Tess is completely under Darcy's spell. Over the past few weeks, Darcy has told her that he doesn't love Dee and wants to break up with her. The only reason he hasn't done it so far is that he doesn't want to hurt Dee's feelings." Tess initially believed him, but she became frustrated and decided to send Dee a letter telling her everything. Vendy thought that Tess felt that everything would be okay between herself and Darcy, even if her best friend hated her for a while. However, Darcy tries to retrieve the letter before Dee reads it, as he actually liked having two girlfriends.

=== Departure and returns ===
In 2001, Vendy quit Neighbours and her final scenes aired that September. Jackie Brygel of the Herald Sun reported that Vendy's decision surprised a lot of people in the television industry. Vendy said she did not regret quitting the show, telling Brygel "It was late last year when I started thinking about whether or not I should stay on the show for much longer. With any role, you don't want to become stereotyped, which can happen if you stay on a show for too long. It can make it a lot harder to get another job." In addition to wanting to try new roles, Vendy also said that she got "itchy feet" and missed being able to go travelling. Vendy was grateful to Neighbours for providing her with her big break. She called it her "foundation" and thought that actors that forget where they come from was "quite ridiculous." Her character's final scenes see her leave Erinsborough and her "womanising" fiancé Darcy. Vendy was pleased with Tess' exit story and relieved that she "came to her senses" about Darcy, adding "I didn't want her to be a victim. I think the storyline is a bit of a victory for women and you've got to love that."

Vendy reprised the role in 2023. On 2 December, Tess' return was announced via the official Neighbours Twitter/X account. They posted a photograph of Vendy in character and Tess' return coincides with a protest to save the Erinsborough High school from closure. On 2 January 2025, it was announced that Vendy would be reprising the role of Tess later that year, with Neighbours' official Instagram account teasing, "Another blast from the past! Krista Vendy is soon set to reprise her role as Tess Bell... but what's brought her back to Erinsborough this time?"

== Storylines ==
Tess attends an interview with Susan Kennedy for a teaching post at Erinsborough High. She is successful and secures the position. During her first week at the school, Tad Reeves (Jonathon Dutton) is a constant thorn in Tess' side but she ultimately gets the better of him. On New Year's Eve 1999, Tess arrives at Number 28 with a cut on her face and admits to Susan that her husband, Brendan is responsible. Susan sympathizes and helps Tess collect her stuff, only to find Brendan has changed the locks. After smashing her way in with a rock, Tess is then caught by Brendan who tries to put on a calm front, but Susan is not fooled and speaks to former Neighbour Philip Martin (Ian Rawlings) about renting his old house, Number 32 Ramsay Street to Tess.

After Tess settles in Ramsay Street and makes friends with Anne Wilkinson (Brooke Satchwell) who moves in with her, Brendan is persistent in her life making it seem like Tess is overreacting about him. Tess then softens after Brendan goes away for a while then returns leaving her flowers. Teresa surprises her students when she comes to school in the same clothes she had been wearing the previous night. When Daniel Fitzgerald moves into Number 32 while his house is repaired, Tess worries how Brendan may react to find her sharing with another man. When Brendan returns, Tess unexpectedly kisses him and the couple move closer together after she lets him stay when his car fails to start. Tess' friends Libby Kennedy (Kym Valentine) and Steph Scully are unimpressed with the fact that she has forgiven Brendan but Tess is adamant they can make it work this time. Things become strained with Tess and her friends and when Brendan loses his patience with Paul McClain (Jansen Spencer) and Michelle Scully (Kate Keltie) for nearly running him over on their bikes, Susan mentions it to Tess, but she shrugs it off.

Upon Brendan's return, he is incensed to find out from Toadfish Rebecchi (Ryan Moloney) that Tess has gone clubbing. Brendan storms out into a vicious downpour and drives to confront his wife. While on the road he pulls out from behind a bus and collides with Steph and Libby on a motorcycle, injuring the three of them. Tess rushes to hospital and Brendan explains that it was an accident. Tess believes him at first but doubts it when Toadie tells her about the incident leading up to the crash. After Brendan is charged with reckless driving, Tess wonders if she will ever forgive him but Karl Kennedy (Alan Fletcher) breaks the news that Brendan is dead.

Being racked with guilt on top her own grief, Tess tries to build bridges when it is learned that the accident has rendered Libby unable to have children. Everyone realises she was just as much a victim in of this. When Dan returns and begins staying once again, Tess is worried when she becomes more and more attracted to him. Dan reveals that the one person he is interested in is Steph, and likes Tess as a friend. Local nurse Dee Bliss moves in with Tess as her next housemate, but her living habits don't sit with well with Tess at first. After Dee sprains her ankle, Tess has no choice but to let her stay but with some binding house rules. The ladies then become fast friends.

When Philip sells the house, Tess and Dee decide to put in a bid but they are beaten by new teacher, Evan Hancock (Nicholas Opolski) on auction day. Tess and Dee then look for new accommodation, with Dee moving next door into the spare room Number 30. Tess, deciding she cannot live in a student environment with Toadie and his friend Joel Samuels (Daniel MacPherson), looks further afield and begins house-sharing with Veronica Anderson (Monika Karwan) in a nearby suburb. Tess later forges a friendship with doctor Darcy Tyler, Dee's boyfriend, which later turns into a love affair. Dee later finds out and exposes the affair in the pub leaving Darcy and Tess humiliated. Tess flees and goes into hiding for a while, ending things with Darcy.

Darcy, however, refuses to give up and proposes to Tess, who shocks everyone by accepting. When Tess stumbles upon Darcy's scheme to take over the local surgery and leave Karl jobless, she has doubts which mount up until the day of the wedding. After contacting Darcy's ex-girlfriend, Alice Jamison (Pip Sallabank), Tess decides not to go through with the wedding and stands Darcy up. Before leaving for London to find teaching work, Tess pays Dee a visit and they resolve things.

Twenty-Two years later, Tess returns to join a protest against the closure of Erinsborough High School. She and Susan see each other and begin to reminisce.

Two years later Karl contacts Tess due to his suspicions about Darcy and meets her in secret, Tess reveals she and Darcy were married and that they divorced due to Darcy's shady dealings, his manipulating behaviour and his infidelity. Tess warns Karl that Darcy is not to be trusted.

== Reception ==
A writer for the BBC's Neighbours website said Tess' most notable moment was Dee's discovery of her affair with Darcy. Jason Herbison, writing for TV Week, proclaimed "She may be one of the most beautiful residents in Ramsay Street, but when it comes to men, Tess Bell really doesn't have much of a clue!" The Herald Sun's Jackie Brygel branded Tess "the least dowdy-looking teacher we've seen in our entire TV-viewing lives". Referring to Vendy's modelling career, Brygel added "And sometimes it's smart to look like you've just stepped off the cover of a men's magazine when you're a school-teacher on a nightly soapie." Writing for TV Week, Brygel and Sigourney Gray praised the character's departure, stating "We were all sad to see her leave, but we couldn't help cheering when Tess left the evil Dr Darcy Tyler standing at the altar back in 2001. What a way to leave a soap!"
