= List of Neighbours characters introduced in 2001 =

Neighbours is an Australian television soap opera. It was created by Reg Watson and first broadcast on 18 March 1985. The following is a list of characters that first appeared in the soap in 2001, by order of first appearance. All characters were introduced by the show's executive producer Stanley Walsh. The 17th season of Neighbours began airing on 15 January 2001. Jess Fielding made her debut in the following month. Matt Hancock arrived in March, while his father, Evan, and Jack Scully began appearing from April. Maggie Hancock made her debut in May and Larissa Calwell arrived the following month. September saw the introduction of Tim Collins. Sandy Allen began appearing from October, while Mitch Foster followed in November. December saw the introductions of Liz Conway, Stuart Parker and Elly Conway, as well as the year's first birth, Ben Kirk.

== Jess Fielding ==
Jess Fielding
- Neighbours character
- Portrayed by: Elisha Gazdowicz
- First appearance: 14 February 2001
- Last appearance: 4 May 2001
- Introduced by: Stanley Walsh
In-universe information
- Occupation: Student
- Sisters: Mary

Jessica "Jess" Fielding, played by Elisha Gazdowicz, made her first screen appearance on 14 February 2001. Jess was a student at Erinsborough High who reported Susan Kennedy (Jackie Woodburne) for hitting her and was accused of planting a bomb, a storyline which saw her make an immediate impact on the show. A writer for the Daily Record said Gazdowicz's character was "one viewers either love or hate" and they called Jess a "vixen" and a "wild child" who managed to upset everyone in Ramsay Street. Gazdowicz told the writer that she hoped she did not become a hate figure, saying "I was worried about the way my character comes across as I know it is seen by millions of people world-wide. I just want viewers to like Jess but I can understand why they don't." Gazdowicz also revealed she was the opposite to Jess when it came to school work. Following a confrontation about a low mark, Jess lashes out at her teacher, Susan Kennedy. Susan strikes Jess in self-defence and she is later suspended for her actions, while an investigation is carried out. Jess' boyfriend Tad Reeves (Jonathon Dutton) witnessed the incident and urges Jess to tell the truth about what happened. Jess initially refuses, but she eventually confesses that it was not Susan's fault.

Jess joins Year 12 at Erinsborough High and immediately attracts the attention of Tad Reeves. Jess makes an enemy of Susan Kennedy and she displays no interest in her school work. Tad asks Jess out and she agrees to a date. They work together on a school project and when Tad goes to Jess' home, he is shocked to see how wealthy her family is. Jess tells Tad that her sister, Mary, has had a baby and her parents have being ignoring her to spend time with Mary and their new grandchild. Jess' behaviour at school become worse and when a bomb threat is reported, Jess becomes the prime suspect. A bomb does go off on the school playing field and Jess finds herself under suspicion from Susan and Tad. It is later revealed Colin Rogers (John Tarle) set the bomb. Jess becomes angry with everyone who had accused her. A few days later, Susan gives Jess a low grade for an assignment and Jess confronts her. Susan takes Jess aside after class to talk to her about the mark and her behaviour. Jess lashes out at Susan and Susan puts her arm up to defend herself, causing Jess to fall to the ground. Jess makes everyone aware of the attack and her mother threatens to file a complaint with the school. Susan is suspended and Tad tries to work out why Jess is trying to ruin Susan's career. Eventually Jess admits Susan was not to blame and the complaint is dropped. Jess turns up at Tad's home asking if she can stay. She explains she had an argument with her parents and Tad manages to talk her into calling them. Tad realises his relationship with Jess is becoming too serious and he ends it.

== Matt Hancock ==
Matthew "Matt" Hancock, played by Stephen Hunt, made his first screen appearance on 26 March 2001. Matt was the first member of the five strong Hancock family to be introduced. Matt is the eldest of the Hancock children and he tries to play an adult role in their household. James Joyce of The Newcastle Herald said Matt is intelligent, but has trouble applying himself to study. He added Matt's parents "despair about his future", but are proud of his looks and wit.

== Evan Hancock ==
Evan Hancock
- Neighbours character
- Portrayed by: Nicholas Opolski
- Duration: 2001–2002
- First appearance: 13 April 2001
- Last appearance: 9 May 2002
- Introduced by: Stanley Walsh
In-universe information
- Occupation: Teacher; Councillor
- Wife: Genevieve Murdoch; Maggie Hancock
- Sons: Matt Hancock; Chris Hancock; Leo Hancock
- Daughters: Francesca Hancock; Emily Hancock

Evan Hancock, played by Nicholas Opolski, made his first appearance on 13 April 2001. At the beginning of the year, the Neighbours scriptwriters decided to introduce some "new blood" to the show to fill the void left by the temporary departures of six regular characters. The writers created the five strong Hancock family, consisting of two parents and three children. Opolski was cast as Evan Hancock the head of the family and a new teacher for Erinsborough High. In his fictional backstory, Evan was previously married to Genevieve Murdoch (Julie Campbell), but they divorced when their sons; Chris and Matt (Stephen Hunt) were young. Evan then married Maggie (Sally Cooper) and they had two children; Leo (Anthony Hammer) and Emily (Isabella Oldham). A writer for Inside Soap said "conveniently Evan is a teacher who happens to land a job at Erinsborough High." The Hancock's were described as fun-loving and the "average Aussie family." A writer for the BBC described Evan as being committed to progressive education and a devoted father. They said "Evan's easy going manner made him popular with his kids and students alike. That's not to say he didn't run into problems. Sometimes, his kids were embarrassed to have a high school teacher as a father, while his students have been known to take advantage of his good nature." In 2002, the entire Hancock family were written out of Neighbours.

When Evan gets a job at Erinsborough High, he also decides to move his family to the suburb. Evan outbids Dee Bliss and Teresa Bell (Krista Vendy) for Number 32 Ramsay Street and manages to upset his new neighbours. Shortly after moving in, Evan's ex-wife, Genevieve, arrives and tries to convince their son, Matt, to go to Switzerland to attend a catering school. Evan is pleased when Matt turns her down, but he is upset when his other son, Chris, decides to stay with Genevieve. Evan gets off on the wrong foot with Susan Kennedy (Jackie Woodburne) when he reveals he has a radical approach to teaching. Evan feuds with both Joe Scully (Shane Connor) and Karl Kennedy (Alan Fletcher). Leo tells Evan that his P.E teacher, Dean Hearn (Jason Buckley), is unfairly treating him and Evan witnesses Dean pushing his son to the ground. Evan goes to Susan with his concerns, but Dean convinces her he did nothing wrong. Evan is horrified when he hears Dean admitting to throwing a chalk duster at Leo and he gets angry with him. Susan asks Evan to leave the school to cool off, while Dean resigns. The Hancocks begin having money worries and Evan and Maggie are concerned by Leo's strange behaviour. When they see him taking money from his friends, they confront him and he tells them that he has a paper round. Evan is not convinced and later learns Leo has been selling essays to raise money for break dancing lessons. Evan then bans Leo from attending any more classes, but when he sees how talented he is, Evan relents. Things between Evan and Maggie become strained when her studies get in the way of home life. Evan runs for a position on the local council against Joe and wins. Evan starts becoming estranged from his wife and children and he helps Genevieve when she returns to ask for his support, following a break up. Evan keeps his meetings with Genevieve a secret. Evan is shocked when he learns Matt and Leo have been involved in a car crash and Harold Bishop (Ian Smith) was injured too. Evan is angry with Matt when he faces police charges and Matt runs away. He later returns and Evan and Maggie are faced with large legal fees to keep him out of jail. They decide to sell their house. Evan's marriage to Maggie is strained further when he learns Toadfish Rebecchi (Ryan Moloney) is in love with her and tried to kiss her. Evan asks her for a divorce, but he and Maggie later decide to work through their issues. Evan and his family then say goodbye to their neighbours and leave.

Following his introduction, James Joyce of the Newcastle Herald quipped that Evan should prove extremely popular with the younger residents as he is the new maths teacher at Erinsborough High. Jackie Brygel of the Herald Sun called him brave for taking the job at the high school. A writer for the BBC said Evan's most notable moment was "Emailing The Chronicle about bullying and causing a huge row between him and Susan Kennedy."

== Jack Scully ==
Jack Scully, played by Paul Pantano, made his first screen appearance on 17 April 2001. Following the introduction of the Scully family in 1999, Jack was often mentioned by his parents and siblings. Producers later decided to introduce the character and Pantano was cast in the role. The character was reintroduced in 2002, with Jay Bunyan taking over the role. Bunyan was auditioned for the role in New Zealand by Jan Russ. A writer for the BBC described Jack as being "a little feisty" and said he "certainly set the cat among the pigeons with the local teenage girls when he came to Erinsborough."

== Maggie Hancock ==
Maggie Hancock
- Neighbours character
- Portrayed by: Sally Cooper
- Duration: 2001–2002
- First appearance: 19 April 2001
- Last appearance: 9 May 2002
- Introduced by: Stanley Walsh
In-universe information
- Occupation: Law student
- Husband: Evan Hancock
- Sons: Leo Hancock
- Daughters: Francesca Hancock; Emily Hancock
- Stepsons: Matt Hancock; Chris Hancock

Maggie Hancock, played by Sally Cooper, made her first screen appearance on 9 May 2001. The character was introduced alongside her family, after the Neighbours scriptwriters decided to add some "new blood" to the show to fill the void left by the temporary departures of six regular characters. Cooper was cast as Maggie, the matriarch of the Hancock family. Maggie is married to Evan (Nicholas Opolski) and they have two children; Leo (Anthony Hammer) and Emily (Isabella Oldham). Maggie is also a stepmother to Chris and Matt (Stephen Hunt). Maggie is a law student and a writer for the BBC stated "Maggie had a difficult task in negotiating her way through the world of the modern blended family. It was a role she managed well. Add all this to her legal career and you have one very busy woman." Maggie works alongside Toadfish Rebecchi (Ryan Moloney) and he later confesses his feelings for her. They almost share a kiss, but Maggie "nipped the romance in the bud". However, Evan finds out that Maggie and Toadie were more than friends and Maggie has to decide whether she is still fully committed to her husband. Hunt, who played Matt Hancock, commented "Toadie was the one who started it, but there was some doubt whether Maggie had feelings for him too." Evan and Maggie are united when Matt is involved in a car accident and when Maggie spots Evan and Matt sorting through their issues, she decides her marriage is worth saving and convinces Evan to try again. In 2002, the producers decided to write the Hancocks out of the show.

Maggie and her family move to Erinsborough after her husband, Evan, gets a job at the local high school. On the day they are moving into 32 Ramsay Street, Maggie and Evan realise that their youngest son, Leo, is missing. They drive round looking for him and eventually find him in the local pub with Toadfish Rebecchi. Maggie learns Toadie is in his final year of law and she reveals she is also a law student. They become friends and Maggie helps Toadie with his court case against UniFM radio. Shortly after their arrival, Maggie and Evan deal with the anniversary of their daughter Francesca's death. Maggie reassures Leo that it was not his fault Francesca died and learns he has spoken about it with Dee Bliss (Madeleine West). Maggie becomes eager to help Libby Kennedy (Kym Valentine) sue The Chronicle for unfair dismissal. Libby's father, Karl (Alan Fletcher), believes his daughter should not pursue her case as she is pregnant and he takes his frustrations out on Maggie. Libby eventually takes an out-of-court settlement. Maggie is not happy when she realises that Evan has been feuding with most of their neighbours. The family are also hit with financial difficulties, with matters being made worse when Emily loses a pair of expensive earrings and goes missing. The police tell Maggie and Evan that Emily boarded a bus, but ran off when the driver opened the door. They join the search and Maggie is delighted when Leo finds Emily.

Maggie takes on some work from a legal firm and she starts spending less time at home, which Evan resents her for. Maggie and Evan suspect Leo is taking drugs when they notice his strange behaviour. However, Matt discovers that Leo is actually writing essays for his classmates so he can pay for breakdancing lessons. Evan bans Leo from breakdancing, which causes a rift between them. Maggie finds it hard to concentrate on her studies and she fails an exam. After she pleads her case, Maggie is allowed to graduate and she begins working at a law firm with Toadie. Maggie learns he likes someone at work and assumes it is the sandwich girl. Maggie and Evan continue to grow apart and Maggie accuses him of trying to control the family. She also becomes fed up with Evan's ex-wife Genevieve (Julie Campbell), leaning on him for support. Toadie tells Maggie that he has feelings for her and it causes tension between them at work. However, as her family problems increase, Maggie becomes closer to Toadie. Just as they are about to kiss, Evan appears and announces Matt and Leo have been in a car accident. Maggie and Evan discuss selling their house to pay for Matt's legal fees and Maggie realises she needs to stay loyal to her family. She goes to see Toadie and tells him she is sticking by her family and rejects him when he tries to kiss her. Emily later finds and reads out a letter from Toadie, which mentions his feelings for Maggie. Evan becomes angry when Maggie tells him Toadie made her feel alive, and he demands a divorce. After selling their house, Maggie and Evan manage to resolve things and the family move to Albury.

A writer for the BBC said Maggie's most notable moment was when she rejected Toadie.

== Larissa Calwell ==
Larissa Calwell
- Neighbours character
- Portrayed by: Leah de Niese
- First appearance: 11 June 2001
- Last appearance: 6 August 2001
- Introduced by: Stanely Walsh
In-universe information
- Occupation: Student

Larissa Calwell, played by Leah de Niese, made her first appearance on 11 June 2001. De Niese previously appeared in Neighbours as Miranda Starvaggi when she eleven years old. Larissa is involved in a love triangle between Paul McClain (Jansen Spencer) and Tad Reeves (Jonathon Dutton). She and Paul first meet off-screen, before Tad pretends to be Paul in a series of emails to Larissa. She soon asks to meet Paul, but then Tad admits that he is romantically interested in her too. Jansen commented: "They both like her, so they have to go along with the lie otherwise she will be dirty on both of them and neither of them will have her."

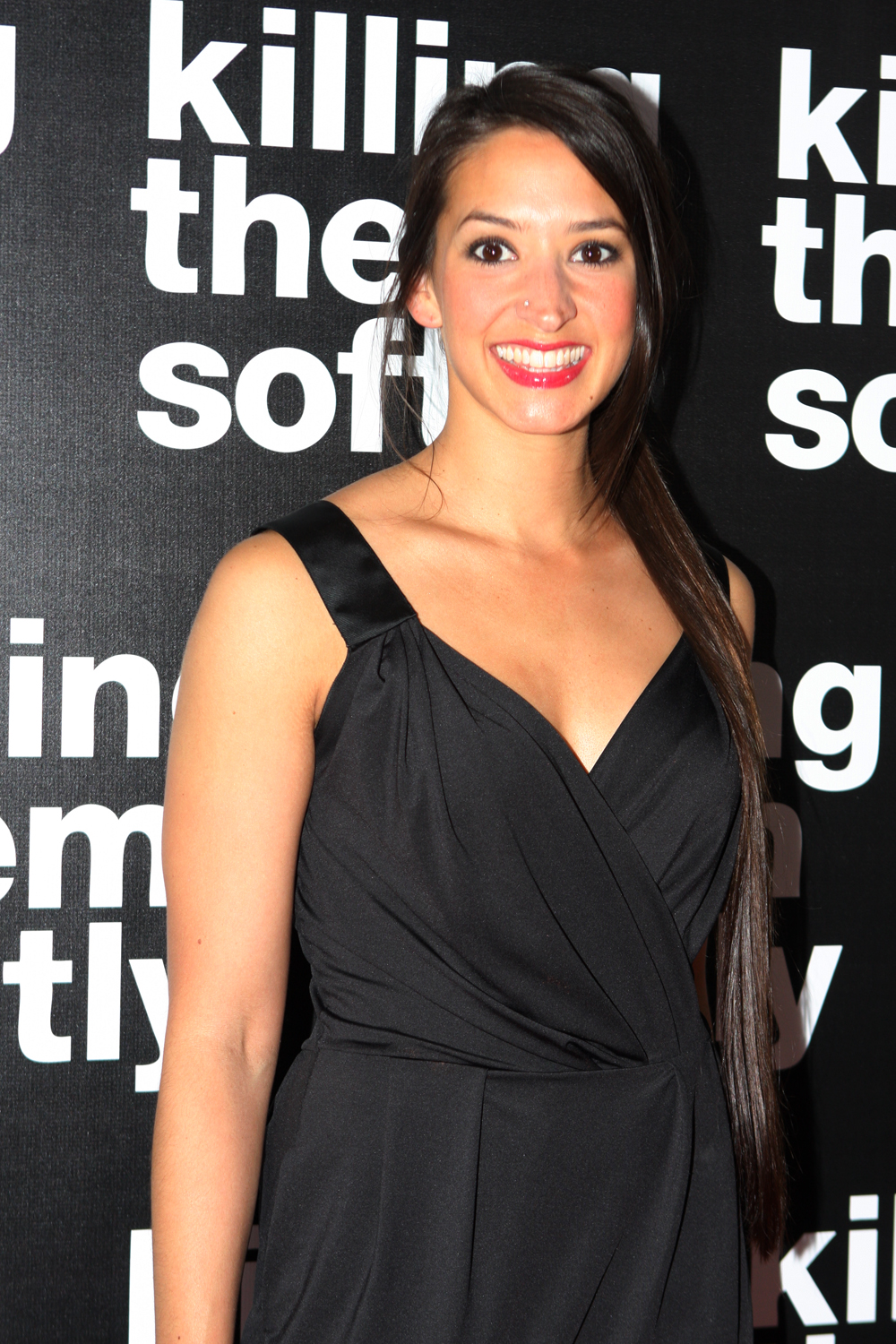
Leah de Niese portrayed Larissa Calwell

When they eventually admit what they have been up to, Larissa "turns the tables" on them. Dutton said "She's hurt when she finds out, but them she turns it to her advantage. She thinks that since she likes both of them, she'll give them both a trial run and then decide who she's most attracted to." Paul and Tad agree to Larissa's plan and try to out do each other on their respective dates. Tim Randall of the Daily Record observed: "Larissa is loving every minute of having two men fighting for her affections – and she just can't wipe that smug smile off her perky little face." Larissa was described as being a "sly manipulator" by a writer for a film press kit.

During a trip to Paris, Paul McClain befriends Larissa. Upon his return to Australia, Paul learns Larissa has been emailing him and Tad Reeves has been replying on his behalf. Paul believes Tad's personality will win Larissa over and he asks him to continue emailing her. Larissa calls Paul and tells him she is coming to visit him. Tad coaches Paul on some of Larissa's interests, particularly dance music. Paul and Larissa's first date goes well and she reveals that she wants to see him again. They go to the Coffee Shop for their next date, where Paul impresses Larissa with his knowledge of music and DJing. Tad tells Paul to make Larissa a mix tape, but when she wants to see him do it, they make an excuse about the mixing equipment being broken. Paul and Tad reveal to Larissa what has been going on and they decide to let her choose between them. Larissa tells them that she will go on a date with both of them and work out who she prefers. The boys initially protest the idea, but Larissa states that they have been messing her around and they relent.

Larissa picks Paul for the first date. They watch a movie and go for a pizza, which results in Larissa and Paul kissing on the doorstep. A few nights later, it is Tad's turn and he takes Larissa on a date which he makes up as it goes along. Larissa realises that while Paul is romantic, Tad is more exciting. Both boys call Larissa again to arrange another date and they confide in Felicity Scully (Holly Valance), who meets with Larissa to tell her to stop playing games. Larissa states that she is only having a little fun. After her parents catch her chatting online too often, Larissa is taken off the school correspondence course and she begins attending Erinsborough High. Larissa attends Paul's football game and runs into Tad. She tells him she it is a coincidence and that she had just gone for a walk when she spotted the game. Shortly after, Larissa goes to see Tad DJing at a nightclub. Paul also attends the event and catches Larissa and Tad kissing. Larissa leaves, while Paul and Tad fight. However, they realise she is not worth losing their friendship over and they agree to ignore her.

== Tim Collins ==
Tim Collins
- Neighbours character
- Portrayed by: Ben Anderson
- Duration: 2001–2005, 2007–2010, 2013–2022
- First appearance: 27 September 2001
- Last appearance: 25 July 2022
- Introduced by: Stanley Walsh (2001); Ric Pellizzeri (2007); Richard Jasek (2013)
In-universe information
- Occupation: Lawyer; Councillor; Acting Mayor; Owner of the West Waratah Star newspaper
- Daughters: Courtney Grixti
- First cousins: Marc Lambert

Tim Collins, played by Ben Anderson, made his first appearance on 27 September 2001. Tim is a lawyer and has represented or worked with many of the Ramsay Street residents. Tim is Toadfish Rebecchi's (Ryan Moloney) enemy. He has been branded "ruthless" and "slimy" by reporters for the Daily Record. While a writer for the Sunday Mail called him a "creepy" lawyer. Anderson reprised his role as Tim in 2013. On 24 January 2016, Melinda Houston of The Sydney Morning Herald praised Anderson's appearance on the show, saying "Absolutely stealing the show tonight is Ben Anderson as Tim Collins, erstwhile crony of Paul Robinson and now a major player on the apparently powerful and prestigious Erinsborough Council." Tim appears as part of the show's final episodes in July 2022, as he informs Shane Ramsay (Peter O'Brien) about Paul Robinson's (Stefan Dennis) behaviour over the years.

Tim meets Toadie Rebecchi when he begins working for legal firm Stewart, Whitehead and Moore. Toadie discovers an insurance company is about to go bust and he decides to break Tim's confidence to warn his friends. Tim acts as best man at his cousin, Marc Lambert's (David Karakai), wedding to Stephanie Scully (Carla Bonner). Later that same year, he begins working for Susan Kennedy (Jackie Woodburne) during her divorce. Tim leaves Stewart, Whitehead and Moore and asks Toadie to join him at his new firm, Tim Collins & Associates. Despite their differences, Toadie and Tim work well together. When Toadie and Tim lose their premises, they move into the offices at the Lassiter's complex. Tim starts spending a lot of his time in Sydney, leaving Toadie to run the practice. A few months later, Tim and his girlfriend, Molly Milevic (Abby Meates), go out with Toadie and Genevieve Doyle (Lulu McClatchy). Molly has a good time listening to Genevieve's stories about wrestling, but Tim is not impressed. He tells Toadie to break up with her because she does not present a good image for company. However, when Genevieve is hired to sing at the Lassiter's complex reopening, she impresses Tim with her voice. Tim apologises and realises he should not have judged her.

Tim starts taking more cases at the Sydney office, leaving Toadie and Rosetta Cammeniti (Natalie Saleeba) to run the Melbourne office. Tim gives Toadie and Rosie an ultimatum – whoever bills the most hours for a month will get a pay rise, while the loser will be fired. Tim clashes with Toadie's brother, Stonefish (Anthony Engelman) and accuses him of stealing an expensive pen from his father. Tim later finds the pen in his briefcase, but does not apologise to Stonie. Tim displays a lack of compassion when Toadie suffers a panic attack and Rosie later catches him sleeping and listening to music instead of working. She and Toadie realise they are better off working for themselves and they set up their own law firm, Rebecchi Cammeniti. They also take over the lease for the office at Lassiter's. Tim represents Kirsten Gannon (Nikola Dubois) during her custody battle for her son. Kirsten tries to Tim and he rejects her. Tim tells Oliver Barnes (David Hoflin) that his adoptive brother is contesting his rights to their parent's hotel empire. Tim decides to purchase 26 Ramsay Street, so he can knock it down and build townhouses on it. Tim almost wins the house, but he is outbid by Steve Parker (Steve Bastoni) at the last minute. Tim represents Paul Robinson when he is charged with the hit and run of his half-sister. Weeks later Tim is hired by Erinsborough Hospital during their fight with the Kennedy family, who had been denied the right to try IVF. Declan Napier (James Sorensen) hires Tim after he believes Steph was responsible for the accident that caused the death of his wife, Bridget (Eloise Mignon). When Declan realises he cannot afford the legal fees, Tim agrees on a no-win-no-fee case. When it is revealed that Johnno Brewer (Damien Aylward) was responsible for Bridget's death, Paul hires Tim to represent Johnno and lose the case. Lyn Scully (Janet Andrewartha) asks Tim to appeal Steph's jail sentence. Tim tells her he has found some new evidence that could help, but Lyn struggles to meet his fees and later abandons the case.

Paul asks Tim to help him out when Ajay Kapoor (Sachin Joab) and Elaine Lawson (Sancia Robinson) bring a civil action against him, following an explosion on Lassiter's property that killed his wife and her son. Tim advises Paul to offer Elaine a cash settlement. Paul later asks Tim to represent Mason Turner (Taylor Glockner) and ensure that he is sent to prison. However, Mason changes lawyers at the last minute. Tim draws up a lawsuit for Paul when he decides to sue Georgia Brooks (Saskia Hampele). But Paul changes his mind and asks Tim to get his conviction for fraud expunged from his criminal record instead. The following year, Paul calls Tim to mediate between himself, Terese Willis (Rebekah Elmaloglou) and Ezra Hanley (Steve Nation), after the latter decides to sue them. Tim also sits in on Paul's police interview when he is questioned about paying Gary Canning (Damien Richardson) to assault Ezra. He berates Paul for talking and tells him he will be lucky to avoid a jail sentence. After Toadie is injured, Tim pays a visit to his wife, Sonya, to try to find out whether they are planning on suing for compensation. He then relays the information back to Paul, but Naomi Canning (Morgana O'Reilly) asks Paul to call Tim off. Tim tells Naomi that she should listen to Paul, as the Rebecchi's will sue even if they are friends. A few months later, Tim takes Paul's place on the council. He later refuses to help Paul when the police want to question him. Tim is elected to the council and he becomes interim mayor.

After listening to Sonya and Aaron Brennan's (Matt Wilson) concerns about the closure of the community centre, Tim later informs them that it will be closed within a month as it needs too much work and money to maintain it. He later closes the bridge across the lake, after Sonya protests the removal of the love locks. Sonya runs against Tim in the mayoral election. Piper Willis uploads a video of Tim hugging Courtney Grixti online, believing that he is having an affair. However, Courtney is actually Tim's daughter and she manages to talk her father out of taking legal action against Piper. Tim tries to ruin Sonya's character at a public debate, causing Courtney to vandalise his car. Sonya wins the election.

Paul attempts to stop the West Waratah Star from printing a story about his daughter Amy Williams' (Zoe Cramond) involvement with a lingerie-cleaning business, but he soon learns Tim is the paper's new editor and the story is printed. During Erinsborough's run for the Best Liveable Suburb competition, a drunken Mayor Sonya walks onto the stage and publicly bad-mouths Tim, who uses the paper to run a smear campaign against Sonya. He comes to Terese Willis with an offer to smear Paul's name and writes positive stories about Lassiter's, in exchange for a free hotel room, so he can conduct an affair. Tim is blackmailed by Ryan Prescott (James Sweeny), who planted hidden cameras in the hotel rooms, and he gives Terese a USB stick with the footage after paying Ryan. Terese is also blackmailed by Ryan, so she has his car towed. She and Tim watch, before Terese reveals that Ryan will also be visited by the tax office. Tim asks Terese to join him for a drink, but she tells him to go home to his wife.

Tim is incensed to learn that Courtney is engaged to Paul. This is soon revealed to be a ruse, motivated in part to enact revenge on Tim after he believed rumours that Courtney was providing erotic massages in the Lassiter's day spa. Courtney returns to live with Tim after he apologises to her. The next year, Terese arranges to give Tim an exclusive interview with Piper following her boyfriend Tyler's murder trial, in order to protect her from press intrusion in the meantime. After Tyler is found guilty, Piper's interview devolves into her blaming Terese for her situation. Gary, now Terese's partner, threatens Tim to prevent the interview from being published. Tim retaliates by arranging for the kitchens at The Flametree Retreat, where Gary works, to be shut down by the council over health and safety concerns. The following year, another hidden camera is found in a Lassiter's room and Tim sends Paul a link to a website via email. The website is full of all the footage taken from the camera. Paul, Terese and Tim meet at Harold's and Tim tells them that he is not going to publish an article about the footage, as Paul and Terese helped him when the last hidden cameras were exposed. Tim leaves and tells them that they owe him a favour, before Paul and Terese discover that other news websites have already published stories about the footage.

Tim later talks to Amy Greenwood (Jacinta Stapleton) about the new Lassiter's uniforms she is creating. Nicolette Stone (Charlotte Chimes) confides in Tim and he gives legal advice to her, but she decides not to take it on. During a Lassiter’s event in The Waterhole, Tim presents Paul and Terese with a cease and desist letter from an airline company claiming the new Lassiter’s uniforms created by Amy have been copyrighted and stolen from them. Tim explains the legal process to an aggressive Paul and Terese. He then tells them that Amy came to him for advice and he used gained information to inform the airline company on the situation. A few days later, Tim informs Paul and Terese that the airline company has withdrawn the cease and desist and that Lassiter’s is allowed to use the uniforms, before calling Amy an air-head. As he is leaving, he overhears Terese and Harlow Robinson (Jemma Donnovan) discussing Terese’s decision to not have Lassiter’s celebrate Australia Day and support the "change the date" movement. Toadie shows Terese an article that Tim has published in the West Waratah Star about Terese and a statement she said five years prior that contradicts her decision to cancel Australia Day celebrations. Terese confronts Tim, but Tim responds with a smug comment and walks off. Tim visits The Flamingo Bar and compliments Amy on the service. Toadie begins dating his assistant, Melanie Pearson (Lucinda Cowden), at the same time as he is taking on a large legal case for a man named Mr Carmello. Amy accidentally indirectly tells Tim that Toadie and Melanie are dating and Tim calls Mr Carmello to inform him of the unprofessional situation. Mr Carmello drops Toadie as his lawyer and hires Tim. When Toadie finds out, he calls Tim pathetic and says that he will always be alone. The following year, Tim gives Shane Ramsay information on Paul. He gives him files on Paul's ex-wives, when he burnt down Lassiter's complex, owned a sweatshop in Brazil and paid Nicolette Stone (Charlotte Chimes) $1,000,000 to hand over her baby. Tim then says that the latter is his favourite of Paul's wrong doings. Paul later greets Tim in The Waterhole and says that his latest client will not be happy with the way Tim operates. Tim ignores him and continues drinking, as Paul walks off.

== Sandy Allen ==
Sandy Allen
- Neighbours character
- Portrayed by: Catherine Hill
- Duration: 2001, 2007
- First appearance: 5 October 2001
- Last appearance: 6 March 2007
- Introduced by: Stanley Walsh (2001); Ric Pellizzeri (2007)
In-universe information
- Occupation: Pre-school teacher
- Husband: John Allen
- Sons: Braiden Allen
- Daughters: Keisha Allen
- Stepdaughters: Lolly Allen

Sandy Allen, played by Catherine Hill, made her first on screen appearance on 5 October 2001. After her husband, John (Adrian Mulraney), learns he has fathered Lolly Allen (Jiordan Anna Tolli) with Cheryl Stark (Caroline Gillmer), he and Sandy come to Erinsborough to meet her. John and Sandy meet with Lolly several times and they are eventually granted full custody of her. A few years later, Lolly (now played by Adelaide Kane) begins fighting with Sandy and John and they decide to let her visit Lou Carpenter (Tom Oliver). When Pepper Steiger (Nicky Whelan) discovers Lolly has some bruising, the teenager reveals she is being abused by Sandy. When her stepmother comes to Ramsay Street, Lolly decides she cannot live with the abuse anymore and sabotages the brakes on Sandy's car. Kane said "It's got to the point where Lolly can't live like this anymore, and this is Lolly's way of dealing with what's been happening. Trying to sabotage her car is a way that Lolly can avoid directly confronting Sandy and actually coming face to face with her because she's so terrified of this horrible woman." Lolly's plan fails and she and Sandy end up having a confrontation by a swimming pool. Sandy becomes aggressive and when she goes to hit Lolly, Lolly pushes her into the pool, where she hits her head. Lolly eventually jumps in and saves Sandy and confesses everything to Lou.

When a DNA test proves John Allen is the biological father of Louise "Lolly" Carpenter, Sandy encourages her husband to meet his daughter. John meets Lolly a few times, before Sandy asks if she can meet her too. John and Sandy meet up with Lolly and Lou Carpenter, the man who thought he was her father, and Sandy gets on well with Lolly. Shortly afterwards, Sandy beings working in a nursery close to Ramsay Street and she annoys Lou by constantly appearing at the local coffee shop. Sandy apologises to Lou and insists their meetings are simply coincidences. John and Sandy eventually apply for full custody of Lolly and they win. Sandy and John then move to the country. Years later Sandy gives birth to two children following IVF. Sandy starts to resent Lolly's presence as she reminds her of John's infidelity. She begins abusing Lolly mentally and physically. Lolly returns to Erinsborough and Sandy visits her shortly after when she hears Lolly ran away. Sandy warns her not to act up again and agrees to look after her while Lou is away. Lolly later becomes upset and confronts Sandy, while she is cleaning the pool. They have an altercation and Sandy falls into the pool, hitting her head on the way in. Lolly pulls Sandy out and saves her life with CPR. While Sandy is at the hospital, Lolly tells Lou all about the abuse. Upon her return from hospital, Sandy finds her bags packed and she reacts angrily to Lolly's accusations. Lou tells Sandy he has been in contact with John and human services. Sandy leaves realising she has lost her husband and access to her children.

== Mitch Foster ==
Mitch Foster
- Neighbours character
- Portrayed by: Hugh Sexton
- Duration: 2001–2002
- First appearance: 14 November 2001
- Last appearance: 3 September 2002
- Introduced by: Stanley Walsh
In-universe information
- Occupation: Rig supervisor

Mitch Foster, played by Hugh Sexton, made his first screen appearance on 14 November 2001. Mitch is a criminal and an acquaintance of Larry "Woody" Woodhouse (Andrew Curry). A reporter for the BBC's Neighbours website called Mitch "an opportunist" and a "sinister character". Mitch dates Woody's ex-girlfriend Stephanie Scully (Carla Bonner) and she defends him when he is accused of a crime, but they break up when she learns he has been lying to her. Mitch later robs the courier company Steph works for and disappears. Bonner told Inside Soap's Jason Herbison "After the robbery, Steph reported Mitch to the police and then tried to wash her hands of the whole thing. Then out of the blue, a brand new motorbike turns up on her doorstep, as a gift to her. The only person she knows who could've sent it is Mitch, so she decides to do the right thing and tell the cops." However, Steph finds herself under investigation as the police suspect that she either made the story up or she helped Mitch. When she is released, Steph goes to find Mitch. Bonner explained that Steph gave Mitch the benefit of the doubt while others were pointing the finger. Now Mitch is the only one who can get her out of the mess she is in. The BBC reporter added that Mitch took advantage of Steph's kind nature.

When Steph finds herself attracting the unwanted attentions of a group of guys in the pub, Mitch comes to her aid. He later goes to the local garage where Steph is working and delivers a rig for Joe Scully (Shane Connor). Mitch asks Steph out for a drink and he explains that he is friends with her ex-boyfriend, Woody. He is shocked to learn Woody had died in a car accident a few weeks earlier. When asked about his time in prison, Mitch becomes evasive about the topic. Steph invites Mitch to dinner and her mother, Lyn (Janet Andrewartha), joins them as she does not trust Mitch. Mitch manages to impress Steph's family when he smooths things over with his employers, after Joe has an accident in his rig. Mitch and Steph begin dating and Mitch helps Joe out with a client, who threatens to financially ruin him. Steph and Mitch plan to go to Sydney for a holiday, but Woody returns and reveals he was in witness protection. He then tells Steph that Mitch had been in prison for killing a man. Steph decides that she cannot trust Mitch or Woody and decides not to see them again. Six months later, Mitch returns to Erinsborough with serious injuries and begs Steph for help. Mitch tells Steph that he fell from his motorbike and when his wounds have been cleaned up, he disappears again. The next morning, the paper carries a story about an armed robbery and Libby Kennedy (Kym Valentine) calls the police believing Mitch was involved. Mitch turns up at MOCO, Steph's workplace, and threatens her with a gun. He then takes the contents of the till and disappears, leaving Steph to be investigated for assisting a robbery. Steph and Stuart Parker (Blair McDonough) find Mitch in the bush, seriously ill from his injuries. They take him to the hospital and Stuart, an orderly, brings Mitch his lunch and starts talking about the robbery. Mitch admits that no one will ever prove that Steph is innocent and Stuart records the conversation. He gives the tape to the police and Mitch apologises to Steph, before he is arrested and taken away.

A BBC website writer named Mitch's most notable moment as "Holding up MOCO and robbing Steph." After the robbery scenes aired, Ben Doherty of The Newcastle Herald stated "Steph Scully's (Carla Bonner) habit of hooking up with undesirables has come back to bite her in the bottom after she's implicated in no-good Mitch's robbery."

== Liz Conway ==
Liz Conway
- Neighbours character
- Portrayed by: Christine Keogh (2001–2002); Debra Lawrance (2018–2019)
- Duration: 2001–2002, 2018–2019
- First appearance: 5 December 2001
- Last appearance: 25 June 2019
- Introduced by: Stanley Walsh (2001); Jason Herbison (2018)
In-universe information
- Occupation: Administrator; Real estate agent
- Mother: Grace Smith
- Sisters: Carmel Tyler; Susan Kennedy
- Husband: Ian Conway (divorced); Lars Nilsson (divorced)
- Daughters: Elly Conway; Bea Nilsson
- Granddaughters: Aster Conway
- Nephews: Darcy Tyler; Malcolm Kennedy; Billy Kennedy
- Nieces: Libby Kennedy; Holly Hoyland (step)
- Other relatives: Ben Kirk; Jackson Kennedy; Susannah Kennedy

Liz Conway made her first appearance on 5 December 2001, originally played by Christine Keogh. The character was introduced as the older sister of Susan Kennedy (Jackie Woodburne). She comes to Erinsborough to ask Susan to care for her "troublesome" teenage daughter, while she is abroad for six months. On 29 June 2018, Sophie Dainty of Digital Spy confirmed that the character would be returning to the show the following month, with former Home and Away actress Debra Lawrance in the role. An Inside Soap writer confirmed that Lawrance would be joining the show for an extended guest stint. Of her casting, Lawrance told Dainty, "It's fabulous, really fabulous. I have got some very dear friends on the show and it's only filmed 20 minutes from my house."

Liz returns to Erinsborough to reunite with her daughters Elly Conway (Jodi Anasta) and Bea Nilsson (Bonnie Anderson). Lawrance also said Liz was very different from her sister Susan, with the actress calling her "ego-centric, very selfish and quite flighty." In September 2018, Anderson said that Liz would be returning, and Inside Soap confirmed that she would appear from December. Following her return, Bridget McManus of The Sydney Morning Herald praised Lawrance's performance, saying she "shines in the unforgiving role of the scatty, heinously insensitive mother of reluctant songstress Bea (Bonnie Anderson). The dark humour of their clash gives way to the heavier theme of the mother-daughter bond, in all its manifestations. Not even Christmas can call a ceasefire in this fractious cul-de-sac." The character returned again on 24 June 2019.

Following their mother's death, Liz and her younger sister Susan (Woodburne) fall out. Liz marries Ian Conway (Peter Maver) and they have a daughter, Elly (Kendell Nunn; Jodi Gordon/Anasta). When Liz is offered some work in Sweden, she visits Susan. After apologising to her, she asks her to look after Elly. Susan agrees and Elly arrives a week later. A few months later, Liz returns and reveals that she has a new boyfriend called Lars and that she is pregnant. Elly confronts Liz about her paternity, as she has come to believe that Susan's husband Karl Kennedy (Alan Fletcher) is her father. Liz realises how confused Elly is and reassures her Ian is her biological father. Karl tells Liz that Elly needs some love and attention from her mother, and after discussing things with Lars, Liz decides to take Elly to Sweden with her.

Sixteen years later, Liz returns to Ramsay Street after Susan informs her that her daughters, Elly and Bea, need her support, having recently been manipulated and held hostage by Finn Kelly (Rob Mills). Liz also learns that Bea slept on the streets after leaving home at 15. Elly asks her mother whether she ever said or implied anything that meant she did not want Bea around, but Liz assures her that she was not at fault. However, the following morning, she lets Bea believe that Elly does not remember saying she wanted her gone. Bea then finds an old photo of Liz and Elly in Liz's wallet, and realises that she has been folded out. The sisters confront Liz, who admits that she wanted Bea gone, as she reminded her too much of her father, Lars. Elly and Bea ask Liz to leave, while Susan encourages her to stay and fix things with her daughters. Liz asks Elly and Bea to lunch, but she drinks too much and they leave when she tries to make the situation about her. Liz also rejects Susan's advice. When Mark Brennan (Scott McGregor) later finds an injured Liz on the ground, with the contents of her bag strewn around her, she claims that she was mugged by Finn. Liz's purse is later found in some undergrowth and when Mark analyses the CCTV footage from that night, he sees a drunken Liz tripping over. Mark confronts Liz, and she admits to Elly and Bea that she made up the story about Finn attacking her. Liz attacks Susan verbally for having an easy life, but Susan counters that Liz only thinks about herself. Before Liz leaves, she apologises to her daughters, while Susan decides to go with her in order to help her deal with her past.

Liz comes to stay with Susan and her daughters for Christmas. She tells them that the retreat she attended really helped her, and she has stopped drinking. Liz later explains to Susan that she wanted to make sure her daughters were coping, following Susan's arrest for attempted murder. Liz says that she will be around to hold the family together if Susan goes to prison. Liz meets Bea's boyfriend Ned Willis (Ben Hall) and flirts with him and Mark during lunch. She later finds a card from Mark's sister Chloe Brennan (April Rose Pengilly) in which she declares her love for Elly. Liz calls Chloe selfish and advises her to tear the card up and keep her feelings to herself.

== Elly Conway ==
Elly Conway made her first screen appearance on 13 December 2001. The character was originally played by Kendell Nunn. Elly is the "rebellious niece" of Susan Kennedy (Jackie Woodburne). A writer for Neighbours.com said Susan and Karl (Alan Fletcher) would have their work cut out for them trying to keep Elly out of trouble, adding that she was "smart, insightful and just a touch rebellious". On 28 April 2016, Jonathon Moran of The Daily Telegraph reported that the character would be returning to the show with actress Jodi Anasta in the role. Anasta initially signed a three-year contract and made her first appearance as Elly on 18 July 2016. Elly is now a school teacher, like her aunt Susan, and Anasta said "I get to play out one of my childhood dreams of being a teacher and I get to have fun and be a little bit naughty."

== Stuart Parker ==
Stuart Parker, played by Blair McDonough, made his first screen appearance on 13 December 2001. McDonough's looks and personality attracted the attentions of the show's producers when he became a runner-up on the first series of Big Brother Australia. He was offered a three-month contract to play Stuart. Shortly before his debut episode aired, McDonough's contract was extended to six months. Stuart comes from Oakey. He is introduced as the younger brother of one of Drew Kirk's (Dan Paris) friends. Stuart later follows Drew to Erinsborough. McDonough thought he was similar to Stuart, saying "There's a lot of him in me. He's a fairly straightforward guy, who's just out to have a good time." Dan Silkstone of The Age branded Stuart a "goodnatured country boy." McDonough was nominated for the Logie Award for Most Popular New Male Talent in 2002.

== Ben Kirk ==
Ben Kirk, played by Noah Sutherland, made his first on-screen appearance on 14 December 2001. Ben is the son of Libby Kennedy (Kym Valentine) and Drew Kirk (Dan Paris). Ben's birth placed Libby's life in danger and she was rushed to intensive care with blood loss, but she eventually recovered. Valentine told TV Week that Sutherland was "a complete natural" and that she had bonded with him "straight away". Paris admitted that he was a little nervous around the baby, saying "Working with Noah has been quite daunting - it's unfamiliar territory to me." Blake O'Leary was later cast in the role of Ben. A writer for Network Ten described Ben as being "his mother's biggest supporter and her rock".

== Others ==
Date(s)	Character	Actor	Circumstances
16 January–15 February	Jeannie Truman	Libby Stone	Allana and Clementine Truman's mother. Lance Wilkinson dates Allana and learns she still lives at home with Jeannie, who is a possessive mother. Jeannie states that she is sick and needs Allana at home as she cannot survive without her. Allana begs her mother not to make her choose between her and Lance. Eventually the two women sit down and talk through their issues. Jeannie later gives Lance and Allana the money for them to go to America together.
16 January–15 March	Richie Hampson	Michael O'Malley	A Beauty Tree Salesman, who tries to manipulate Lyn Scully into investing in the company. Teresa Bell meets Richie at a singles night. She thinks he is the perfect man until she realises he is using her to make himself look good at events.
19 January–2 February	Alice Jamison	Pip Sallabank	Darcy Tyler's partner, who co-owns a medical practice with him. She arrives in Erinsborough and finds Darcy at a ball with Dee Bliss and warns her off. It becomes evident that Darcy and Alice are having difficulty in their relationship and they later break up.
20–21 February	Fergus MacLeod	Tommy Dysart	Drew Kirk's great uncle who arrives from Scotland to attend Drew's wedding to Libby Kennedy. On the eve of the wedding, after preparing a haggis, he recites a Robert Burns poem. Fergus sings backing vocals with Harold Bishop for Drew's rendition of "Wild Mountain Thyme", which is performed at the reception.
21 February	Sally Kirk	Niobe Dean	Sally and Stuart are Drew Kirk's siblings. They come to Erinsborough for his wedding to Libby Kennedy.
21 February	Stuart Kirk	Stephen Godfrey	Sally and Stuart are Drew Kirk's siblings. They come to Erinsborough for his wedding to Libby Kennedy.
21 February–12 April	Reverend Loftus	Bill Johnston	Reverend Loftus presides over the wedding of Libby Kennedy and Drew Kirk and the funeral of Madge Bishop.
1–22 March	Glen Goldman	Gerard Cogley	A radio presenter and DJ, who hosts a quiz show that Lance Wilkinson takes part in. Lance meets with Glen, who gets his name wrong, and he goes on to win $500. Lance takes up Glen's offer to double his money twice, and he takes part in a phone-in after revealing he is doing a Labours of Love challenge to win over Allana Truman. During an advert break, Glen asks Lance to come back the following week to win $8000, but Lance is hesitant to risk the money he already has. Glen tells him that it is in the bag and he gives Lance the questions for the quiz. Lance goes on to win the $8000, but he does not sound enthusiastic about it. He then tells the listeners that he is doing the quiz to win enough money for Allana and him to go to America, but he would rather stay home than take money from a rigged quiz show, as Glen tries to get Lance to stop talking.
6 March–5 July 2002	Nathan Tyson	Luke Hemsworth	Nathan plays for the Eastside Dingoes football team. His teammate Paul McClain discovers he is using steroids to enhance his performance on the field and warns him of the dangers. However, Nathan threatens him into keeping quiet. After Nathan continues using steroids, Paul informs the team doctor Karl Kennedy. Nathan attacks Paul and is dropped from the team after refusing a drug test. Nathan later takes a job as a baliff and repossesses a television set from Number 24 after Tad Reeves allegedly racks up debts. He also takes some things from Lou Carpenter's pub when he fails to settle his debts.
29 March, 6 April	Steve Crandall	Travis Clark	A delivery driver for MOCO. Stephanie Scully is tasked with sacking either him or fellow driver Dave Patrick. Steph decides to sack Steve, as he is the company's most recent employee, until she learns that he needs the money for his daughter, who has asthma. After learning Dave's wife has recently died, Steph goes with her first decision and arranges to meet Steve at the local pub, where he reveals that he has been offered a better job with MOCO's rivals.
30 March	Dave Patrick	Chris Gaffney	A long-time delivery driver for MOCO. When Stephanie Scully is tasked with sacking a driver, she has to choose between him or Steve Crandall. Steph learns Dave's wife has recently died, but chooses to sack him over Steve, who has a sick child. However, when she approaches Dave, he asks her to contribute to a colleague's birthday collection and explains how the company has become his whole life since the death of his wife. Steph changes her mind, but Steve later quits taking the decision out of her hands.
6 April	Brian Curtis	Ron Bingham	A food critic, who comes to review the menu at Lou's Place for the Perfect Pub competition. Owner Lou Carpenter is distracted throughout the visit, as he worries about his friend Madge Bishop, who has terminal cancer. In honour of Madge, Lou serves "Spag Madge", a spaghetti dish from her recipe book, which impresses Brian. He tells Lou that he will put his pub on the shortlist.
17 April–17 May	Veronica Anderson	Monika Karwan	Teresa Bell begins house-sharing with Veronica "Ronnie" Anderson and they become good friends. Ronnie develops a crush on Drew Kirk, who fixes her car for her. Ronnie steals a photo of Drew and deliberately damages her car in order to spend more time with him. Drew tells Ronnie that he does not have feelings for her, but she later kisses him, just as his wife, Libby, walks in. Ronnie begins following Drew and making up rumours of an affair between them. Libby finds a missing poster featuring Ronnie's photo and learns that she is actually Pamela McAdam. Pamela's father, Gordon, arrives and explains that her husband died on their honeymoon and she latched on to Drew because he looked like her husband. Gordon then takes Pamela home.
20–26 April	Elly Turnbull	Cherise Donovan	Elly is Michelle Scully's friend and classmate. She is a maths genius and becomes upset when her teacher Daniel Fitzgerald leaves Erinsborough High. However, she develops a crush on his replacement, Evan Hancock and refuses to hear anything bad said about him.
20 April–11 May	Aleks Rama	Dean Ali	Aleks is Leo Hancock's best friend. He comes to stay with the Hancock family while his parents go away to Albania.
23 April–13 September	Barry Burke	David Whiteley	Barry is a criminal associate of Kev Kelly, who is sent to track down Larry Woodhouse, the main prosecution witness trial against Kev. He brings Johnny Otten to Carpenters' Mechanics in order to threaten Woody out of testifying and levies threats against The Scully family. After the harassment escalates, Woody goes into Witness protection. When Steph Scully tracks Woody down, Barry begins following her and almost catches her. Several weeks later, Barry surprises Woody and orders him to drive at gunpoint. The vehicle then crashes and explodes, witnessed by Steph who is distraught. However, several months later Woody returns alive and well, revealing only Barry died in the crash.
25 April–6 March 2002	Genevieve Murdoch	Julie Campbell	Shortly after Evan Hancock and his family move to Ramsay Street, his first wife, Genevieve, arrives to visit their son, Matt. She offers to pay for Matt to attend a culinary college in Switzerland, but when Genevieve comments on Evan's lack of ambition, he tells her to leave. Months later, Genevieve contacts Evan and admits she has had a cancer scare. She also reveals that her husband had not been very supportive. Evan asks Matt to speak to his mother, but their meeting goes badly. Evan continues to see Genevieve and supports her when she reveals she is getting divorced. When Genevieve comes to the Hancock house during a party for Evan, Maggie Hancock asks her to leave. Evan and Matt back her up and Genevieve goes.
27 April–26 July	Nigel Armstrong	Andy Poulter	Nigel lives above Drew Kirk and Libby Kennedy at their apartment complex in Eden Hills. His constant drumming annoys the couple. When Drew complains, Nigel counters that he and Libby are equally noisy. Nigel's drumming gets worse and Drew threatens him, after a recuperating Libby is disturbed. Sergeant Ralph Walker turns up and Drew believes Nigel called him, but Walker reveals he is there on an unrelated matter. Nigel later apologises to the couple and they reach a compromise.
10 May–6 June	Luke Dawson	Adrien Foley	Luke is a student and skateboarder. He dates Felicity Scully, but realises things are not working out between them because Felicity is not over Joel Samuels. They break up, but remain friends. Luke later invites Felicity to stay with him for a while.
15 May–6 June	Simone Pike	Amanda Levy	Simone is a British traveller, who meets Joel Samuels in London. She comes to Ramsay Street and notices there is tension between Joel and Felicity Scully. Simone later ends the relationship as Joel is in love with Felicity.
17 May	Gordon Scott	Lachlan MacDonald	Gordon is Pamela McAdam's father. Libby Kennedy contacts Gordon and explains that his daughter is in Erinsborough and has become fixated on her husband, Drew Kirk. Gordon thanks Libby and Drew for contacting him and he takes his daughter away to get her some help.
23 May–2 February 2012	Audrey	Audrey	When Drew Kirk finds a young female Cairn Terrier in a cardboard box, he takes her home to his wife Libby. Since they were not allowed to keep pets in their flat, the couple take her to the local shelter. When they learn that the puppy has a heart condition and will be put down, Libby and Drew adopt her and name her Audrey. After Drew dies, Libby moves away to Adelaide, but Audrey later walks back to Melbourne and is found by Jamie Clarke. She is later taken in by Stuart Parker. When Malcolm Kennedy runs Audrey over, she is taken in by his parents Karl and Susan Kennedy. Year later, when Audrey becomes lethargic and refuses to eat, a vet confirms that she is suffering from liver shunt. Karl and Susan have Audrey put to sleep and she is buried at the nursery.
14 June–2 July	Dean Hearn	Jason Buckley	Dean is the P.E teacher at Erinsborough High. He starts bullying Leo Hancock and is confronted by his father, Evan. Dean claims Leo has got the wrong end of the stick, but Evan witnesses Dean pushing Leo to the ground. Susan Kennedy speaks to Dean and he tries to manipulate her emotions. Susan then witnesses more incidents involving Dean and when he throws a board duster at Leo, she tells him a full internal investigation would take place. However, Dean resigns.
18 June–6 July	Laura Wallace	Fiona Choi	When Laura goes to Lou's Place to ask about a job, she is chatted up by Matt Hancock. She gives him her number and they arrange a date. Laura and Matt discover they have a lot in common. Matt claims that he lives alone, but when Laura notices toys lying around his house, he admits he lives with his family. Laura tells Matt that she is a strippogram and that her past boyfriends have had a problem with that. Matt initially accepts Laura's job, but his jealousy starts to come out and he admits that he hates it. Laura gives him another chance and asks him to fill in as her minder at a party. However, Matt punches one of the party goers who gets too close and Laura is sacked. She breaks up with Matt, but they decide to stay friends and Laura later puts Matt's name forward for a job as an Elvis impersonator.
28 June–4 November 2002	Collector Bob	Henry Ismailiw	Collector Bob owns a store called Toy Heaven in the local mall, which is visited by Leo and Emily Hancock. Emily notices a doll in the store similar to one she owned before it went missing. Emily accuses Bob of stealing the doll and she and Leo plan to get it back. Leo uses a remote control car to distract Bob and they hide in the store, but they are caught. Bob accuses of them of theft and calls their mother, Maggie. She proves the doll belongs to Emily as she owned it when she was a child and the doll has teeth marks caused by her dog. Bob reluctantly surrenders the doll. A year later, Bob gives Joe Scully a cheque for $2000 when he cashes in his vinyl collection to fund his daughter Michelle's exchange trip to New York.
18–19 July	Dame Margaret Woolstead	Helen Noonan	A famous opera singer, who Libby Kennedy seeks an interview with when she comes to Eden Hills. Libby goes to her house, but Margaret refuses to give her an interview. However, just as Margaret goes to close the door, Libby doubles up in pain and believes that she is losing her baby. Margaret calls an ambulance and takes Libby inside, where she grants her the interview to take her mind off the pain. Margaret later visits Libby in the hospital.
13 August–17 October	Marcus Teague	David Gould	Marcus is a representative of Total Cover Healthcare who meets with Darcy Tyler who plots to sell the Erinsborough medical centre from under Karl Kennedy's nose. Marcus is prepared to offer $1.6 million for the practice but refuses to proceed unless Karl is involved. He later pulls out of the deal after finding another site.
15–22 August	Rhonda Wilson	Brenda Addie	Rhonda is the mother of Sheena Wilson. She flirts with her daughter's boyfriend, Toadfish Rebecchi and tries to give him a shoulder massage one day, but he quickly leaves. Rhonda comes to Toadie's house for dinner with him and Sheena, but they are left alone when Sheena is called into work. Rhonda attempts to seduce Toadie, but they are interrupted by his housemates. Toadie and Sheena later break up and Rhonda calls Toadie about meeting up, but he turns her down.
29 August–10 September	Victor McMillan	Desmond Connellan	Darcy Tyler asks Victor to cover some shifts at his practice, which he co-owns with Karl Kennedy. Darcy later tells Victor that he needs to integrate himself into the practice, so he might become a partner and then they can take it over and sell it off as a superpractice. Victor meets Dee Bliss at a singles night and they go on a date. Victor mentions the superpractice to Dee and she tells Karl, ruining Darcy's plan.
4–11 September	Monique Disney	Jacqi Swallow	During a Year 12 camping trip, Paul McClain and Tad Reeves try to impress Monique. She holds Paul's hand, while Tad talks about the stars. Felicity Scully is annoyed when she has to share a tent with Monique as she believes she is stringing Paul and Tad along. The group share a bottle of whiskey, which Tad had brought with him. Tad is stung by a scorpion and he collapses. The others fetch their teacher Susan Kennedy and she realises they have all been drinking. Tad is taken to hospital and the following day, Susan suspends Monique, Felicity and Paul. Monique then takes the opportunity to reveal that Tad brought the alcohol along.
13 September–7 October 2002	Adam Stevens	Nicholas Colla	Adam is a student at Erinsborough High, who hassles Leo Hancock. In order to make some money, Leo begins writing essays for Adam and his mates. When Adam and his friend hand in identical essays, he tells Susan Kennedy who wrote them, before being suspended. Adam bullies Boyd Hoyland on his first day at school, but later thanks him when he takes the rap for a prank. Adam becomes captain of the cricket team and befriends Max Hoyland.
24 September–14 November	John Allen	Adrian Mulraney	John has an affair with Cheryl Stark and seven years later, he sends Lou Carpenter a letter explaining that he believes he is Cheryl's daughter Louise's biological father. John meets Lou and he takes a DNA test, which proves he is Louise's father. John and his wife Sandy meet and bond with Louise. Lou tells John that he can have access to Louise for one day each month, but John explains that he wants more. John later applies for full custody of his daughter and wins. He and Sandy then decide to move to the country and they take Louise with them.
3 October–4 February 2002	Archie Whitehead	Jerry Booth	Archie is one of the senior partners of the law firm Stewart, Whitehead and Moore. He offers Toadfish Rebecchi an internship. Archie is unimpressed when he sees Toadie handling confidential documents and seemingly shredding the wrong files, which Tim Collins told him to do so. Toadie becomes annoyed when Archie constantly forgets his name. At a function, Toadie manages to insult Archie's sleeping friend by suggesting he is drunk when in fact he is ill. Several weeks later, at another function to welcome the new interns at the firm, Toadie tires of covering Tim's mistakes and tells everyone in attendance that he never wanted to become part of a corrupt firm such as Stewart, Whitehead and Moore.
4 October–6 February 2002	Zack Shaw	Owen Lee	Michelle Scully meets Zack, while he is doing community service for a graffiti charge. They begin dating and Zack starts attending Erinsborough High. He ignores Michelle when she tries to get his attention and later tells her that as he is older, he thought it was best that they only see each other outside of school. Zack tells Michelle that they should take their relationship to the next level, but Michelle is unsure that she wants to have sex with him. Zack turns his attentions to Elly Conway and asks her out to a gig, but she turns him down. Zack then tells Michelle their relationship is over and he spreads rumours about her being frigid. Michelle retaliates by writing rumours on the blackboard that he is gay.
29 October–25 July 2003	Annabelle Mann	Justine Press	Annabelle is hired to be a mediator when John Allen and Lou Carpenter fight for custody of Louise Carpenter. Annabelle decides that Lou should retain custody of Louise. A few years later, Annabelle represents Cameron Hodder a doctor who was fired by Karl Kennedy. Cameron reveals that he had been in a relationship with Karl's daughter, Libby and that it ended badly. Annabelle realises that Cameron has cost them the case and the judge rules that Karl pays Cameron for the remainder of his contract.
16 November–6 December	Vernon Wells	Vince Gil	Joel Samuels visits marine biologist Vernon in the hopes of getting a job. Joel brings Matt Hancock and Toadfish Rebecchi along and they climb aboard Vernon's boat. Vernon initially assumes they are there to rob him, but Joel asks for a job and Vernon puts him on his dive team, which is scheduled to dive on a ship wreck. Joel lies that he has his deep sea diving certificate and Dee Bliss tells Vernon that he has an ear infection to stop him diving. Joel later gets his certificate and Vernon gives him a second chance. Joel finds the items they are searching for and Vernon offers Joel a research job with him.
21 November–30 January 2002	Scotty Gibson	Philip Cameron Smith	Scotty asks his friend, Drew Kirk, for a large loan to keep his farm open. Drew and his wife Libby decide to lend Scotty the money, but Drew makes him sign a contract to have the money back before their baby is born. A few weeks later, Drew and Libby realise they need the money and during a trip to the rodeo, Drew asks Scotty about it. Scotty explains that he does not have it and he later turns up in Erinsborough asking for more money and begins emotionally blackmailing Drew, as Drew was responsible for Scotty losing a leg when he accidentally shot him when they were younger. Drew eventually tires of the events of the past being held over him and gives Scotty $50 and gets him a job at Lou's Place. However, Scotty does not show any gratitude and publicly exposes Drew's responsibility for his amputation but Joe Scully comes to Drew's defence and Drew ends his friendship with Scotty.
28 November–5 March 2002	Serena Lucas	Ruth Callum	Serena works for Karl Kennedy and Darcy Tyler as their receptionist. She starts flirting with Karl, but he asks her to stop and issues her with a warning. Darcy asks Serena out on a date and when he steps outside, Serena steals a prescription pad from his bag. Serena steals more prescription pads from the surgery and hands them over to Cam Crane. Fake prescriptions start turning up and Serena lies that someone may have stolen them when she went to the Coffee Shop. Darcy later spots Serena handing over some pads to Cam and calls the police on her.
