= Fergus MacLeod =

Fergus MacLeod may refer to:

- Fegus MacLeod, a fictional character in the television series Neighbours
- Crowley (Supernatural), born Fergus MacLeod, a fictional character in the television series Supernatural
