= Tessa (disambiguation) =

Tessa is a feminine given name. Tessa or TESSA may also refer to:

- Tessa (novel), by Margit Sandemo
- Tessa (play), by Jean Giraudoux
- Tessa, Niger, a village and rural commune
- Tessa Elliot, a human side character from the webseries Murder Drones (2021-2024)

== See also ==
- TESSA (disambiguation)
