= Tabasa =

Tabasa may refer to:

- An alias for Charlotte Helene
- Tessa (disambiguation)
