= Tess (given name) =

- Gender: Female

Origin
- Origin: Greek
- Meaning: "Harvester; to reap," "Summer," "Star"

Other names
- Related names: Theresa, Therese, Tessa, Esther, Hester

Tess is a feminine given name, typically a diminutive form of Theresa or Tessa. It is occasionally a diminutive form of Esther or Hester.

== People ==
- Tess Amorim (born 1994), Brazilian actress
- Tess Broussard (born 1972), American model and actress
- Tess Daly (born 1969), British television presenter
- Tess Frazer, American actress
- Tess Gaerthé (born 1991), Dutch singer
- Tess Gallagher (born 1943), American writer
- Tess Gardella (1894–1950), American actress and vaudeville performer
- Tess Gerritsen (born 1953), American novelist
- Tess Harper (born 1950), American actress
- Tess Haubrich (born 1990), Australian actress
- Tess Henley (born 1987), American singer-songwriter
- Tess Holliday (born 1985), American model and blogger
- Tess Jaray (born 1937), British painter and printmaker
- Tess Joffroy (born 1994), Réunionese singer-songwriter
- Tess Kingham (born 1963), British politician and one-term Member of Parliament
- Tess Lambe, Irish vaccine development scientist
- Tess Ledeux (born 2001), French freestyle skier
- Tess Mattisson (born 1978), Swedish singer
- Tess Merkel (born 1970), Swedish singer
- Tess Oliveira (born 1987), Brazilian water polo goalkeeper
- Tess Olofsson (born 1988), Swedish football referee
- Tess Rafferty, American writer, comedian, and actress
- Tess Richey (1994–2017), Canadian murder victim
- Tess Rothschild (1915–1996), British counter-intelligence officer and magistrate
- Tess Routliffe (born 1998), Canadian Paralympic swimmer
- Tess Taylor (born 1972), American poet, academic, and CNN contributor
- Tess Wiley (born 1974), American singer-songwriter

== Fictional characters ==
=== Film ===
- Tess Skeffington, in Murder By Death, played by Eileen Brennan
- Tess Carlisle, in Guarding Tess, played by Shirley MacLaine
- Tess Carroll, in Charlie St. Cloud, played by Amanda Crew
- Tess Coleman, in Freaky Friday, played by Jamie Lee Curtis
- Tess Durbeyfield/D'Urberville, in Tess, based on Thomas Hardy's novel, played by Nastassja Kinski
- Tess Finnegan, in Fool's Gold (2008), played by Kate Hudson
- Tess Harding, in Woman of the Year, played by Katharine Hepburn
- Tess McGill, in Working Girl, played by Melanie Griffith
- Tess Nichols, in 27 Dresses, played by Malin Åkerman
- Tess Ocean, in Ocean's Eleven (2001) and the sequel Ocean's Twelve, played by Julia Roberts
- Tess Tyler, in the television movie Camp Rock and Billboard Dad, played by Meaghan Jette Martin
- Tess Scali, in Burlesque, played by Cher

=== Television ===
- Tess Adamson, on the New Zealand soap opera Shortland Street
- Tess Bateman, on the British medical drama Casualty, played by Suzanne Packer
- Teresa Bell, on the Australian soap opera Neighbours
- Tess Doerner, on the American science fiction series The 4400, played by Summer Glau
- Tess Fontana, on the American series Eureka
- Tess Foster, protagonist of the Canadian sitcom Life with Boys
- Tess Harding, on the series Roswell, played by Emilie de Ravin
- Tess Silverman McLeod, on the Australian series McLeod's Daughters, played by Bridie Carter
- Tess Mercer, on the American series Smallville
- Tess O’Malley, on the Disney Channel series Raven's Home
- Tess Ramsey, on the American soap opera Port Charles, played by Kelly Monaco
- Tess Smith, an alternate personality of the character Jessica Buchanan on the American soap opera One Life to Live, played by Bree Williamson
- Tess, on the television series Touched by an Angel, played by Della Reese

=== Books and comics ===
- Tess Durbeyfield/D'Urberville, in the novel Tess of the D'Urbervilles by Thomas Hardy
- Tess Clark, in Chuck Palahniuk's novel Haunted
- Tess Trueheart, in the Dick Tracy comic strip series

=== Video games ===
- Theresa "Tess" Servopoulos, in the game The Last of Us
- Tess Wintory, in the game Test Drive Unlimited 2
- Tess Everis, in the game Destiny (video game)
- Tess Greymane, in the game World of Warcraft

== See also ==
- Tessa
- Tess (disambiguation)
