= TESSA =

TESSA may refer to:

- Tax-exempt special savings account, a tax-privileged investment wrapper in the United Kingdom which was replaced by the ISA
- Texas Severe Storms Association
- The online historical collections at the Los Angeles Public Library named after Tessa Kelso, the city's chief librarian 1889–1895

== See also ==
- Tessa (disambiguation)
