= Darcy Tyler =

Fictional character in the Australian soap opera Neighbours

- Neighbours character
- Portrayed by: Mark Raffety
- Duration: 2000–2005, 2025
- First appearance: 15 November 2000
- Last appearance: 23 June 2025
- Introduced by: Stanley Walsh (2000); Ric Pellizerri (2004); Jason Herbison (2025)
In-universe information
- Occupation: Doctor; Orderly
- Father: Robert Tyler
- Mother: Carmel Tyler
- Aunts: Susan Kennedy; Liz Conway
- First cousins: Malcolm Kennedy; Libby Kennedy; Billy Kennedy; Holly Hoyland (step); Elly Conway; Bea Nilsson
- Other relatives: Ben Kirk; Jackson Kennedy; Susannah Kennedy

Darcy Tyler is a fictional character from the Australian soap opera Neighbours, played by Mark Raffety. He made his first screen appearance during the episode broadcast on 15 November 2000. The following year, Raffety became a series regular. He departed in June 2003, but made returns in 2004 and 2005. He made another return for the soap's 40th anniversary on 20 March 2025 and departed on 23 June 2025 after being arrested.

== Development ==
Raffety admitted that he did not find Darcy "interesting" to begin with, but he came up with a plan to change him, which the writers picked up on and helped "take Darcy to other places". Of his character's personality, Raffety said: "Darcy has a childlike wish to be loved and nurtured, but at the same time he has a scheming side. At the end of the day he's both an angel and a devil, I suppose!" Rafferty also found that his character was "not without a sense of humour". The actor told Joe Riley of the Liverpool Echo that the reason he stayed with the show was the "opportunity to develop the character".

After Darcy ending his seven-year relationship with Alice Jamison (Pip Sallabank), Darcy begins a relationship with nurse Dee Bliss (Madeleine West). However, Alice "remained a constant thorn in his side", and after realising that Darcy has moved on, she wants revenge. Alice contacts Darcy to say that she is ready to divide their assets, while "planning to take him for everything he's got". Although Alice and Darcy were not married, Alice is legally allowed to take half of Darcy assets, as the law recognises de facto relationships. Things get worse for Darcy after the tax department discovers anomalies in the book-keeping at Karl Kennedy's (Alan Fletcher) surgery, which Darcy oversees. Rafferty commented, "Things are pretty bad for Darcy all around. And this is only the beginning of it all – they're going to get a lot worse!"

The character was written out in early 2003, but producers made sure that he could return in the future. Darcy's departure came at a time when the show was returning to its original focus on families. Raffety admitted that he was "a little bit sad to be going", and believed that more could have been done with his character. He thought Darcy would be missed, and revealed that his favourite storylines had been Darcy's attempt at stealing the surgery from Karl and his schemes to win Dee back. He later said he was enjoying Darcy's stories in the lead up to his exit, saying "The storylines at the moment are vintage Darcy – he's up to his old tricks again and I love it." Darcy's exit scenes aired in June of that year.

On 1 January 2025, in an interview with Johnathon Hughes from Radio Times, Neighbours' executive producer Jason Herbison revealed that he was reintroducing a past member of the Kennedy family. He added that it is "someone who we have wanted to bring back for some time." On 3 January 2025, it was announced that Raffety would be reprising the role of Darcy later that year, with Neighbours' official social media accounts teasing, "Dr Darcy Tyler returns! Susan's nephew will make a shock return to Erinsborough as part of the show's 40th anniversary celebrations. But has dastardly Darcy changed his ways? Or is he set to cause more misery for his old neighbours? We cannot wait to find out..."

== Storylines ==
=== 2000–2003 ===
Darcy arrives in Ramsay Street to stay with his aunt, Susan Kennedy (Jackie Woodburne) and her husband, Karl after accepting a post in Accident and Emergency at Erinsborough Hospital. Darcy immediately catches the eye of Dee Bliss, a local nurse at the hospital who lives in the same street. There is an obvious attraction between the pair and they both begin to enjoy each other's company and attend the medical ball together. Darcy's business partner and girlfriend, Alice Jamison, turns up on the day of the ball and warns Dee to stay away from him. Darcy returns home with Alice, but he comes back to Erinsborough several months later after having broken up with her and resumes his relationship with Dee. After Alice demands money from Darcy to buy her out of the practice, he borrows $1000 from Dee. While working as a locum for Karl, Darcy causes friction by overcharging patients for medication and causing an audit at the surgery, almost causing closure. With things strained between Karl and Darcy at Number 28, Darcy decides to move out. After saving Louise Carpenter (Jiordan Anna Tolli) from drowning in the pool at Number 30, Louise's father, Lou (Tom Oliver) offers Darcy the spare room at Number 22 where he and Louise live.

Darcy begins an affair with Dee's friend, schoolteacher Tess Bell (Krista Vendy) and it remains secret for a while until Lou arrives home to find them kissing. Darcy tries to convince Lou Tess pursued him, but he is not so quick to believe Darcy. The affair is eventually discovered by Dee when she spies Darcy and Tess kissing after winning a fishing competition. At the pub during the celebrations, Dee pours champagne over Darcy and promptly dumps him. Darcy and Tess remain a couple and become engaged, but on the day of the ceremony Tess backs out and jilts Darcy and subsequently flees to London. While arguing with Joel Samuels (Daniel MacPherson), Dee's other ex-boyfriend and housemate, Darcy learns that he fathered the child Dee miscarried and offers sympathy, but is rejected. Darcy tries to make a move on new receptionist, Serena Lucas (Ruth Callum), but she only has eyes for Karl. After learning that Karl is married, Serena turns her attentions to Darcy but this is only a cover to steal prescription pads and deal drugs at nightclub Hemisfear. After a young girl collapses at the club, Darcy is in trouble, but Serena confesses her deceit and is arrested. Darcy suffers a heart attack in the surgery one day and his teenage cousin, Elly Conway (Kendell Nunn) acts quickly to save his life. While in hospital, Darcy is cared for by Dee and they manage to heal their rift.

After a series of meaningless relationships, Darcy dates Lassiter's owner, Chloe Lambert (Stephanie Daniel). She offers him the chance to see a performance of The Graduate at a local theatre after Darcy saves her life during an asthma attack. This relationship does not sit well with Jordan Lambert, Chloe's daughter, who begins a hate campaign against Darcy, including having his car trashed and having him beaten up. While being hospitalised for the second time in a year Darcy overhears a conversation between Dee, and Martin Cook (Tony Bonner), a retiring surgeon and one of Chloe's friends. It emerges that Martin is sexually harassing Dee, but denies it when she makes a complaint. Darcy invents a plan to bring Martin to justice by befriending him and ultimately tricking him into confessing his misdeed, which is recorded on a hidden tape recorder. When Chloe finds out she is unimpressed and she and Darcy part.

Darcy begins working on a scheme to win Dee back. First, he rummages through her personal effects and discovers her marriage certificate which reveals that Dee was previously married to Darren Turner when they were eighteen. Darcy contacts Darren and invites him to Erinsborough to attend a charity ball along with Dee and her partner, Toadfish Rebecchi (Ryan Moloney). Throughout the evening, Darcy puts into action his plan to drive a wedge between Dee and Toadie and asks how she and Darren know each other. When Darren reveals his connection with Dee, Dee and Toadie split up and both come to Darcy for advice. Darcy then contacts Sindi Watts (Marisa Warrington), the sister of his ex-girlfriend Penny (Andrea McEwan), and enlists her in the final phase of his plan; he pays her to flirt with Toadie at the pub just as Dee walks in with Darcy's cousin, Libby Kennedy (Kym Valentine). Sindi falls for Toadie for real and Darcy is displeased, but is forced to comply when Sindi threatens to reveal his plan.

After gaining acceptance to the Aurora Club, Darcy begins playing poker regularly and ends up $10,000 in debt to James Atkinson (Jeff Keogh). Darcy's gambling gets the better of him and the next time he loses, he owes $60,000. Desperate to pay James, Darcy resorts to burgling the pub and stealing $2,000 from the takings but it is not nearly enough. Upon learning of Karl and Susan inheriting some valuable jewellery from an elderly relative, Darcy stages a break-in at Number 28, but is discovered by Lyn Scully (Janet Andrewartha). Upon fleeing the scene, he knocks a pregnant Lyn down. Darcy is able to pay off James. Darcy treats Lyn after she is admitted to hospital. Lyn cannot remember at first, but after hypnotherapy, she remembers Darcy being at the Kennedys on the day of the robbery. Susan is outraged and refuses to believe it. However, Dee finds Susan's ring in a plant pot at Darcy's place and contacts the police. Darcy tries to sneak the ring back into the house during dinner with Karl and Susan but when Karl spills some wine and Darcy offers a handkerchief, the ring falls out onto the kitchen table. Darcy is forced to confess. After being told to leave by Susan, Darcy walks away and notices police cars arriving on Ramsay Street. He makes a run for it but his escape is blocked and he is arrested for burglary. While on remand, Darcy summons Dee and Toadie to visit him and reveals his plan to split them up, garnering disgust from them both. Darcy is later given an eighteen-month prison sentence for his crimes.

=== 2004–2005 ===
Darcy is seen again the following year when, Lou is sentenced to three years imprisonment for being involved in Rocco Cammeniti's (Robert Forza) horse fixing scam. Lou, fearing the worst, is a little relieved when Darcy is revealed to be his cellmate at Warrinor. Lou agrees to sponsor Darcy for day release but is unable to after being in prison himself. Susan reluctantly agrees and Darcy works as an orderly at Erinsborough Hospital.

After learning of Karl and Susan's separation, Darcy antagonizes Izzy Hoyland (Natalie Bassingthwaighte), the woman Karl had left Susan for. On the day of Izzy's maternity appointment, Darcy sneaks a look at her records and sees that the father of her baby is listed as "Unknown". Darcy confronts Izzy and she offers him money to keep quiet but he refuses to keep quiet. As Darcy turns to leave, he falls down the stairs, hits his head on the wall and loses consciousness. Izzy quickly plants some jewellery on him. After lapsing into a coma, Darcy is transferred to a hospital near his mother Carmel Tyler (Kirsty Child), with little hope of recovery.

However, Darcy wakes from his coma when he is transferred back to Erinsborough Hospital. He keeps up the pretence of being comatose when crooked nurse Gareth Peters (Philip McInnes) taunts and steals from him. Gareth continues taunting Darcy, who eventually punches him. As he is being wheeled down the corridor, Darcy locks eyes with Izzy, who faints in Karl's arms. Darcy passes a police polygraph test after claiming to have no memory of the supposed robbery Izzy alleged. Darcy blackmails Izzy as he remembers her secret and demands $70,000. Izzy pays him, but Darcy demands $200 plus sexual favours. Izzy then contacts Paul Robinson (Stefan Dennis) out of desperation to get rid of Darcy by asking him for the number of a hitman. Paul, also in hospital with Darcy, only gives Izzy a number for a local linen supplier.

Darcy stands trial and Izzy testifies with a glowing reference, resulting in Darcy escaping with a 12-month good behaviour bond. Darcy immediately considers the debt repaid. Before leaving, Darcy gives Susan a letter revealing the truth about Karl not being the father of Izzy's baby. As Darcy's bus is about to depart, he meets Karl who is frosty with him and tells him that he is not the evil person in his life and will one day be thankful that Susan is there for him.

=== 2025 ===
Karl and Susan are shocked when Darcy returns to Erinsborough, renting Number 22 Ramsay Street from Paul's partner Terese Willis (Rebekah Elmaloglou); Darcy explains that he has returned to Erinsborough for a fresh start after having his medical license re-instated, with the ultimate goal of setting up a health centre. Susan eventually begins to trust Darcy after phoning her sister, but Karl remains distrustful. Karl sabotages Darcy's attempts at gaining employment at Erinsborough Hospital, but after Darcy discovers Karl's painkiller addiction, he uses this to his advantage; he blackmails Karl into agreeing to a job share as resident doctor at Terese's retirement community Eirini Rising, which he secures by offering to seduce Paul's ex-fiance Chelsea Murphy (Viva Bianca), whom Terese fears will wreck her relationship with Paul. Darcy develops feelings for Chelsea but the relationship breaks down when the truth is exposed, leaving Karl and Susan disgusted. Despite this, Darcy retains his job at Eirini Rising, proving popular with residents like Vera Punt (Sally-Anne Upton) and Gino Esposito (Shane McNamara).

Darcy befriends Amanda Harris (Briony Behets) upon her arrival at Eirini and soon realises that she is suffering from Alzheimer's disease. Darcy takes advantage of this, deliberately manipulating Amanda into conflict with her daughter Jane Harris (Annie Jones) and grandchildren Nicolette (Hannah Monson) and Byron Stone (Xavier Molyneux) in the hopes of embezzling her finances to fund his medical centre plans. Darcy fears that Karl is about to uncover his crimes and plants drugs in his desk, resulting in Karl's addiction being exposed and his dismissal from Eirini. Darcy eventually realises that Amanda's family are on to him and takes her on a trip to the Dandenongs, where he confesses his crimes. That night, Amanda is found dead, having fallen from a cliff in the area, leaving Jane devastated. Darcy initially evades suspicion for his involvement, having arranged a date with his former flame Tess at the same time to give himself an alibi.

Karl returns from rehab and expresses doubt at Darcy's version of events, believing that Darcy has murdered Amanda. After sharing these concerns with Paul, Karl meets up with Tess, where he learns that Darcy had been late to the meeting (having been with Amanda at the time). Darcy learns of Karl's meetings with Tess and confronts Karl when alone at home during a power-cut. After a tense argument during which Karl accuses Darcy of murder, Darcy attacks Karl by injecting him with powerful anaesthetic before making it appear that Karl had self-administered in a relapse. With Karl rendered comatose in hospital, Darcy begins planning to flee Erinsborough. However, Darcy faces further jeopardy when Paul begins sharing Karl's suspicions amongst the community and Karl emerges from his coma. Darcy steals medication from Elenora Santoro (Gianna Affinity) and administers it to Karl, setting back his recovery to give him long enough to escape; the theft of medication is soon discovered by JJ Varga-Murphy (Riley Bryant), an employee at Eirini, who informs Susan. Darcy realises that his aunt is suspicious of him and attempts to poison her tea before fleeing Erinsborough; however, Susan swaps the tea and calls an ambulance when Darcy collapses, thus confirming Karl's suspicions of Darcy. Karl is saved when the hospital identifies Elenora's medication in his bloodstream and Darcy is finally arrested and charged for his crimes and remanded into custody. Jane visits Darcy in prison, where he confesses that he had taken Amanda to the Dandylongs with the intention of murdering Amanda but decided against it at the final moment, leaving him horrified when Amanda accidentally slipped off the cliff. Jane chooses to believe this version of events and encourages Karl and Susan to visit Darcy to get some closure, during which he lambasts Karl for his weaknesses. Afterwards, a traumatised Karl chooses not to return to Eirini, claiming his ordeal with Darcy had changed him (much to Susan's chagrin) whilst Jane is informed that Darcy has made a full confession for all of his crimes off-screen.

== Reception ==
"All soaps need a good villain, and Neighbours' medic, Darcy Tyler, is just what the doctor ordered. With one eye on the ladies and the other on a dodgy deal, Darcy is shaping up as the baddie we love to hate. Not to mention being easy on the eye! If you were Dee Bliss would you go for cosy Toadie Rebecchi or the dishy doc? We know who we'd choose!"

— An Inside Soap writer on Darcy (2003)

For his portrayal of Darcy, Raffety earned a nomination for Best Newcomer at the 2001 Inside Soap Awards. The following year, Raffety was nominated for the Best Bad Boy award. In 2003, the character came joint thirteenth in a BBC poll to find the Best Villain in the network's drama shows. A writer for the BBC's Neighbours website said Darcy's most notable moment was "Cheating on Dee with Tess, then discovering that Dee was pregnant and had lost the baby."

Cameron Adams of the Herald Sun nicknamed the character "dodgy doctor Darcy". After he robbed and injured a pregnant Lyn Scully, Adams quipped "Oh, how we hate him." Adams later dubbed him "dirty devil doctor Darcy". Molly Blake from the Birmingham Mail branded Darcy "dastardly" and "a bad'un". While Ben Doherty of The Newcastle Herald called him "creepy". Joe Riley of the Liverpool Echo noted, "Dr Darcy is Neighbours' 'baddie', a character who brought much grief to the soap's Kennedy clan, and then ended up in prison." Brian Courtis from The Age observed that Darcy was "back to his old tricks" when he blackmailed Izzy and dubbed him "the bearded villain".

An Ausculture reporter placed Darcy at number six on their "Top Ten Aussie Soap Villains" list. The reporter called him "one of Neighbours' truly great cads" and a womaniser, despite him starting off "rather nicely". They added "he began trying to steal Uncle Karl's surgery from under his feet. Tut tut! Selling prescription drugs in night clubs soon followed, as did his attempt to break up Dee and Toadie, who at this stage were blissfully in love. Finally, Darcy stole from his own family – Karl and Susan – and when running from the burglary, managed to knock over a heavily pregnant Lynn Scully!" On his return, Ausculture said that he was looking shady and sporting an evil goatee.

In 2015, Kerry Barrett from All About Soap placed Darcy at number 23 on the magazine's list of 30 favourite Neighbours characters. Barrett quipped "Darcy was Susan and Karl's nephew and at first he seemed like a thoroughly nice chap. But after a few failed relationships and a lot of gambling debts, Darcy went bad – and we loved it!" Barrett thought Darcy's best moment was "blackmailing Izzy." A TVNZ reporter also included Darcy in their list of the top 30 Neighbours' characters, and stated, "A villain through and through, charismatic yet dastardly, Dr Darcy was the character everybody loved to hate."

In July 2018, Conor McMullan of Digital Spy included Darcy in his list of the "12 characters Neighbours needs to bring back". McMullan wrote, "Before Paul returned in 2004 to cause mischief, it was Darcy Tyler who filled the role of charming neighbourhood villain. His crimes seem a little low-key these days – womanising, burglary, blackmail – but that's what made Darcy work. He wasn't a bad man, but a flawed one and well-played by actor Mark Raffety." McMullan also thought that Darcy was a blank slate for the writers, and speculated that he could be a romantic interest for Terese Willis (Rebekah Elmaloglou), which would upset Paul. His colleague, Daniel Kilkelly branded the character a "legendary schemer", adding that "we all know that relying on devious Darcy is never a good idea."
