= Nicholas Colla =

Australian actor, writer and director (born 1986)

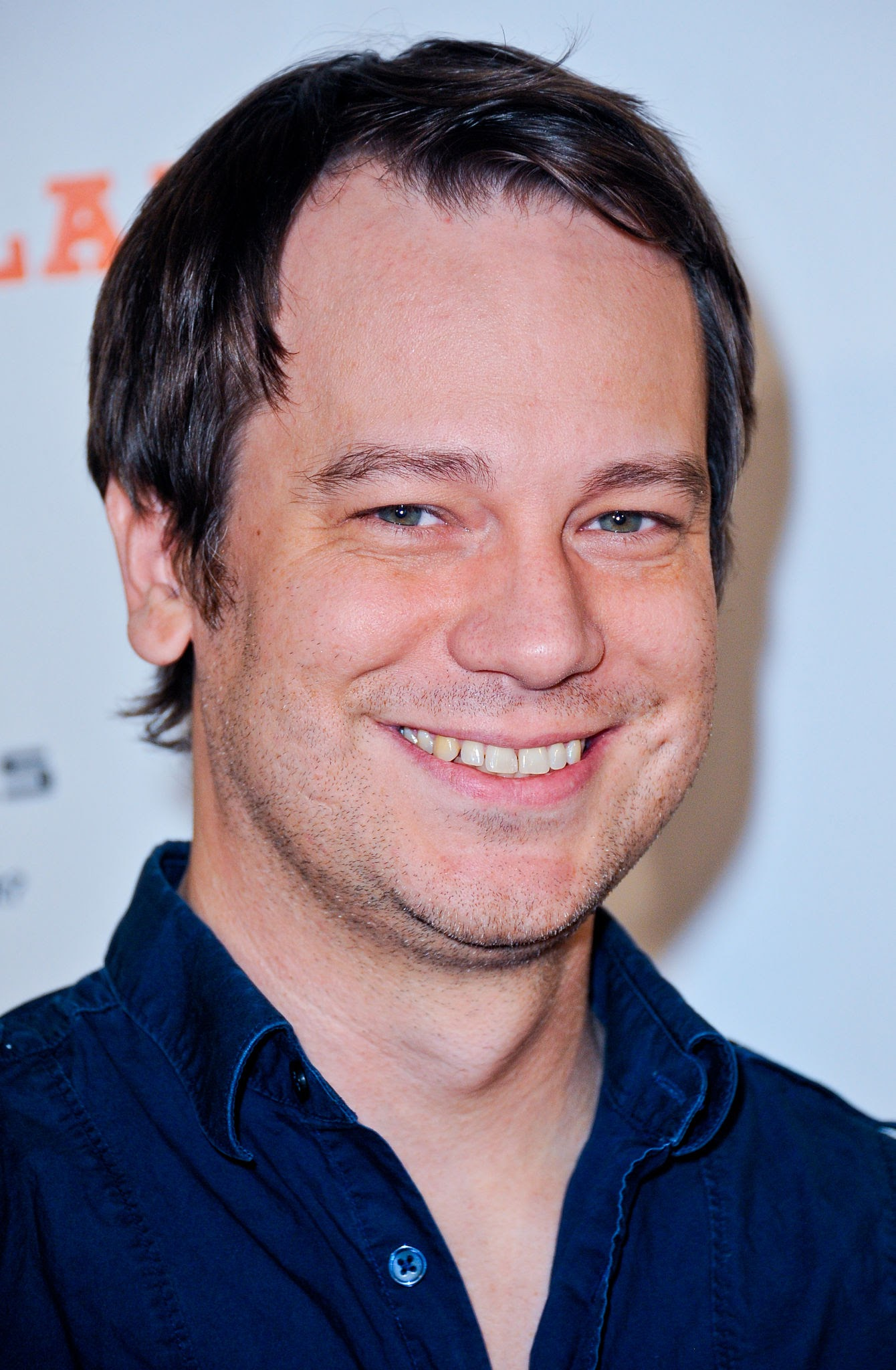
- Actor Nicholas Colla at Babes In Toyland And BenchWarmer Charity Toy Drive held at Avalon on December 9, 2015 in Hollywood, California.
- Born: 14 October 1986 (age 40)

Nicholas Colla (born 14 October 1986 in Melbourne, Australia) is an Australian actor, writer and director, best known for his roles as Joel Peterson in Holly's Heroes and Adam Stevens in Neighbours.

== Career ==
Colla began acting at an early age, appearing in a McDonald's commercial directed by US pilot director David Nutter and shot by Academy Award-winning cinematographer Wally Pfister. Since then he has appeared in television series such as Neighbours, The Saddle Club, Blue Heelers, City Homicide, Wicked Science 2 and the AFI award-winning Holly's Heroes.

Colla's performances on stage include Mamillius in the Bell Shakespeare Company's The Winter's Tale, Shedding directed by Sam Strong at La Mama Theatre, as well as the lead in the debut season of Australian play The Cutting Boys.

His directing credits include the short films Palindromes and Rocketman which have screened at festivals including Palm Springs ShortFest, Cinequest, Flickerfest and St Kilda Film Festival.

He is also a producer on the Australian television series The Wizards of Aus.

== Filmography ==
Year	Title	Type	Episodes	Role
2015	The Wizards of Aus	TV series		Mr Swinton
2015	Molly	TV series		Donnie Sutherland
2014	The Cutting Boys	Theatre		Max
2014	The Weatherman	TV series		Nick Turpinson
2014	John Doe: Vigilante	Feature film		Rob
2013	Winners & Losers	TV series		Miles Englert
2013	Gallipoli from Above	TV mini-series		Frank Parker
2013	Songs for Europe	Theatre		Patrick
2012	Way to Heaven	Theatre		He/Red Cross Worker
2009	City Homicide	TV series		Mags
2006	Blue Heelers	TV series		Darius Jasinski
2005	Wicked Science	TV series		Oliver Simmons
2004	Holly's Heroes	TV series		Joel Peterson
2003	The Saddle Club	TV series		Neville Cowlin
2001–02	Neighbours	TV series	10 Episodes	Adam Stevens
1998	Driven Crazy	TV series		Luke
1997	The Winter's Tale	Theatre		Mamillius
