= Tessa =

Tessa is a feminine given name, sometimes a shortened form of Theresa. It may refer to:

== People ==
- Tessa (rapper) (born 1997), Danish rapper
- Tessa Albertson (born 1996), American actress
- Tessa Balfour, Countess of Balfour (born 1950), British aristocrat
- Tessa Blanchard (born 1995), American professional wrestler
- Tessa Bonhomme (born 1985), Canadian ice hockey player
- Tessa Brooks (born 1999), American musician and influencer
- Tessa Dahl (born 1957), English author and actress
- Tessa Dare, American novelist
- Tessa de Josselin (born 1989), Australian actress
- Tessa Dunlop (born 1974), British television presenter, radio broadcaster and historian
- Tessa Ferrer (born 1986), American actress
- Tessa Fowler, Vanuatuan politician
- Tessa Ganserer (born 1977), German politician
- Tessa Giele (born 2002), Dutch swimmer
- Tessa Gräfin von Walderdorff (born 1994), German countess
- Tessa Hadley (born 1956), British author
- Tessa Hofmann (born 1949), German sociologist
- Tessa Howard (born 1999), English field hockey player
- Tessa Humphries, Australian actress
- Tessa Ía (born 1995), Mexican actress
- Tessa James (born 1991), Australian actress
- Tessa Johnson, American basketball player
- Tessa Joseph, Indian model and actress
- Tessa Jowell (1947–2018), British Labour politician
- Tessa Kelso, (1863–1933), City librarian, Los Angeles Public Library 1889–1895
- Tessa Kennedy (born 1938), British interior designer
- Tessa Keswick (1942–2022), British policy analyst
- Tessa Lark, American concert violinist
- Tessa Majors (2001–2019), American murder victim
- Tessa Mittelstaedt (born 1974), German actress
- Tessa Munt (born 1959), British politician
- Tessa Niles (born 1961), English singer
- Tessa Parkinson (born 1986), Australian sailor
- Tessa Peake-Jones (born 1957), English actress
- Tessa Pollitt (born 1959), British bass guitarist
- Tessa Prendergast (1928–2001), Jamaican actress, fashion designer, and businesswoman
- Tessa Prieto-Valdes (born 1963), Filipino columnist, media personality, and socialite
- Tessa Ross (born 1961), English film producer
- Tessa Sanderson (born 1956), British javelin thrower and heptathlete
- Tessa Schram (born 1988), Dutch actress and film director
- Tessa Simpson (born 1986), American mixed martial artist
- Tessa Tennant (1959–2018), British investment advocate
- Tessa Thompson (born 1983), American actress
- Tessa Violet (born 1990), American musician, singer-songwriter, activist and YouTuber
- Tessa Virtue (born 1989), Canadian ice dancer
- Tessa Wheeler (1893–1936), British archaeologist
- Tessa Worley (born 1989), French skier and military officer
- Tessa Wullaert (born 1993), Belgian footballer
- Tessa Wyatt (born 1948), English actress

== Fictional characters ==
- Tessa Gray, protagonist of The Infernal Devices novel series by Cassandra Clare
- Tessa Noël, in the TV series Highlander: The Series
- Teresa "Tessa" Testarossa, in the multimedia franchise Full Metal Panic!
- Tessa, a character on the TV series Supernatural
- Sage, a Marvel Comics superhero also known as Tessa
- Tessa (Capcom), in the Red Earth video game series
- Tessa, in the Gilbert and Sullivan opera The Gondoliers
- The title character of Tessa (novel), by Margit Sandemo
- The title character of Tessa (play), by Jean Giraudoux
- Tessa Young, the main character in After (2019 film), based on the novel written by Anna Todd
- Tessa James Elliott, a character from the Australian animated web series Murder Drones (2021–2024)

== See also ==
- TESSA, the usual abbreviation for a Tax-exempt special savings account, a tax-privileged investment wrapper in the United Kingdom which was replaced by the ISA.
- TESSA, the Los Angeles Public Library online historical collections, after Tessa Kelso, (1863–1933), City librarian, 1889–1895
- Tess (given name)
