= Tad Reeves =

Fictional character from the Australian soap opera Neighbours

- Neighbours character
- Portrayed by: Jonathon Dutton
- Duration: 1998–2002, 2022
- First appearance: 16 November 1998
- Last appearance: 28 July 2022
- Introduced by: Stanley Walsh (1998); Jason Herbison (2022)
In-universe information
- Other names: Paul West (birth name); Wayne Terrance Reeves
- Occupation: Student; Mechanic; Waiter; Labourer; Disc jockey
- Father: Greg
- Mother: Rachel Bailey
- Adoptive father: Barry Reeves
- Adoptive mother: Coral Reeves
- Sisters: Gemma Reeves (adoptive)
- Half-brothers: Tim Bailey
- Half-sisters: Jasmine Bailey
- First cousins: Toadie Rebecchi

Tad Reeves (also known as Tadpole) is a fictional character from the Australian television soap opera Neighbours, played by Jonathon Dutton. He made his first appearance during the episode broadcast on 16 November 1998. After deciding not to renew his contract, Dutton made his last appearance as Tad on 18 June 2002. He reprised his role in an unannounced cameo appearance in the serial's final episode on 28 July 2022.

== Creation and casting ==
In 1998, Jason Herbison from Inside Soap revealed that producers were casting for the role of Toadfish Rebecchi's (Ryan Moloney) young cousin, Tadpole. Herbison believed that as Toadie had grown up, the soap needed a new "rascal". Jonathon Dutton had had a small guest role in Neighbours as Kenny Hyland before he secured the regular role of Tad. To keep up with his schooling, Dutton was given a tutor on the set.

Dutton departed Neighbours in 2002. Of his decision to leave the soap, Dutton told the Liverpool Echo's Joe Riley "I had done Neighbours for four years and I just felt there was no point in going on for ever. Although they asked me to renew my contract, I decided the time had come for a move, so I gave them six months notice."

== Storylines ==
Tad’s teenage mother Rachel (Carolyn Bock) put him up for adoption following the death of her boyfriend Greg. Barry (Fred Barker) and Coral Reeves (Denise Scott; Donna Lee), who already had a daughter of their own called Gemma (Kathryn Beck), adopt Tad and renamed him Wayne Terrance Reeves. As Wayne grew up, he was nicknamed "Tadpole" or "Tad" for short.

Tad arrives in Erinsborough to stay with his older cousin, Toadfish at Number 30 Ramsay Street. He arrives and is greeted by Toadie's housemate, Sarah Beaumont (Nicola Charles) who tells him Toadie is at the station looking for him. Tad is instantly attracted to Sarah who promptly dismisses his teenage crush. During the first few weeks, Tad causes mischief by stealing Toadie's car and ends up in court on a charge, much to the chagrin of Toadie. Tad's mother Coral arrives for the trial, and tells Tad off for his behaviour. Tad is issued a $100 fine and a 12-month Good Behaviour Bond. Later, he overhears Coral talking to Toadie about Tad staying for 6 months as she is busy at work and finding it difficult to cope with him. Tad runs off after an argument but is found.

Tad later enlists the help of Paul McClain (Jansen Spencer) in creating a website featuring doctored photos of a scantily-clad Sarah. Sarah is upset and annoyed and first when she finds a photo on a poster board at Erinsborough Hospital where she works but she later plays Tad at his own game and takes photos of him coming out of the shower as payback. When Toadie is unable to be a full-time guardian for Tad, he moves in with Paul and his foster parents, Harold (Ian Smith) and Madge Bishop (Anne Charleston). Tad, Paul and Hannah Martin (Rebecca Ritters) begin hanging out at Harold's allotment riding their bikes. John "Teabag" Teasdale (Nathan Phillips) appears and agrees to help them make a BMX video. Tad and Paul quickly learn that Teabag is bad news and have trouble convincing Hannah. Eventually Hannah realises the truth before leaving Erinsborough. Tad begins working at local restaurant, Grease Monkeys but his hours cause friction with Madge and Susan.

Barry, Tad's father pays him a visit and reveals that he and Coral are separating, with the intention divorce and also tells Tad that he is adopted. Tad takes the news very hard begins misbehaving and gets drunk after drinking some alcohol he finds at the garage. Harold finds Tad passed out on the floor and calls ambulance. Tad is rushed to hospital and is diagnosed with alcohol poisoning. After talking things over with Barry and Coral, Tad goes on a quest to track down his birth parents. Tad finds Rachel Jones but discovers she is not his birth mother, leaving him disheartened. The Adoption Agency contact Tad not long after and told him they had located his birth mother, Rachel Bailey. Tad meets Rachel and she tells him she gave him up as a baby as she and her boyfriend, Greg were only teenagers when he was born and that his birth name was Paul. When Tad asks about Greg, Rachel tells him that he died before Tad was born.

Things seem to be going well but Tad is angry when he finds out she has not told her husband and children about him. Tad goes to Rachel's house with the intention to reveal the truth about who he is, but meets his half brother, Tim, who answers the door. Tad opts out of his plan. Eventually, Tad makes peace with Rachel and contact is minimal. Tad displays a talent for being a DJ and Doula Tsobanopoulos (Katherine Halliday) is impressed and offers him the chance to play a few sets at Hemisfear, a local nightclub. Tad's choice of job is met with disapproval from Harold and Madge, but he continues anyway. Tad soon realises Doula is underpaying him and threatens to report her. When Rachel's husband, Stephen arrives at Number 24 with news of Rachel's death during a family picnic, Tad is distraught. Stephen has more news; Tim has Leukemia and every other member of the family has been screened but no one is a suitable bone marrow match. Tad is having trouble processing the news but is willing to help his younger sibling. Tad is a match and Tim makes a full recovery after a shaky couple of weeks.

After a brief spell as a labourer for Joe Scully (Shane Connor), Tad returns to school and begins dating Jess Fielding (Elisha Gazdowicz). Paul and Felicity Scully (Holly Valance) find it hard to get along with Jess because of her attitude. Things get out of hand when one day Jess violently confronts principal Susan Kennedy (Jackie Woodburne) about a paper she received a C+ grade, Tad only manages to catch the end of the argument which looks like Susan struck Jess. Susan is suspended and Tad urges Jess to come clean about the incident. Jess admits she went to slap Susan but she blocked her, resulting in Jess falling to the floor. Tad and Paul later fall out over Larissa Calwell (Leah de Niesse), a girl who Paul met while in Paris with Harold, following Madge's death from Cancer. This starts because Tad assumes Paul's identity via email.

On the Year 12 camping trip, Tad smuggles in a bottle of alcohol to impress Monique Disney (Jacqi Swallow). Tad is stung by a scorpion and fearing that he is going die, he tells Flick that he's always fancied her. After Tad is airlifted to hospital and recovers, he and Flick begin dating but it quickly fizzles out when both realise they are better off as friends than lovers. Shortly after, Paul leaves to play in the AFL for the Adelaide Crows in December 2001, Tad begins University at Eden Hills and frequently stays out all night and sometimes does not return home, which puts Harold at unease. Tad brings home classmate Cherry Fox (Anya Trybala) and is very friendly with her. Harold makes an insinuation about Cherry which annoys Tad, who threatens to move out. When Tad realises it is Harold and Madge's wedding anniversary, they quickly patch up their differences.

Tad meets Steve McCann and Renton Millar and is offered the chance to DJ for an Extreme Sports Tour in America. and leaves for several months. On his return to Erinsborough with the intention to pack up and move to the States permanently, Tad is the victim of identity theft when his passport is stolen and he has allegedly run up thousands of dollars in debt. Tad accuses Connor O'Neill (Patrick Harvey), who has recently moved in with Flick and her family, but is forced to apologise when he finds out Connor is illiterate. One day, Tad and Connor come face to face with the impostor but he is too quick for them and escapes by kicking Connor in the groin. Tad later bumps into Doula, who is surprised to see him in town and offers him a job. Tad is hesitant but takes it. Toadie then figures out that Doula must have set Tad up.

When Tad goes to confront Doula, he discovers Richard Knott (Scottie Cameron), the man who stole his identity and chases after him again. Later that evening, Harold receives a call that Tad has been rushed to intensive care after being hit by a car. When Harold arrives at the hospital with Susan, and her son-in-law Drew Kirk (Dan Paris), nurse Dee Bliss (Madeleine West) tells him Tad was in theatre and lost a lot of blood and died. Harold, devastated, identifies the body which is revealed not to be Tad, but that of Richard instead. Tad turns up at the hospital and Harold is overjoyed. After recovering his documentation and leaving his favourite vinyl record with Harold, Tad says his goodbyes to his friends and Neighbours and Harold drives him to the airport to the soundtrack of Tuba Electrica (a collaboration between Harold and Paul on Tuba and electric guitar respectively).

Twenty years later, he appears in a video messages congratulating Toadie on his marriage to Melanie Pearson.

== Reception ==
A television critic for the Wigan Evening Post said Dutton was "the best thing about the Aussie soap during his four-year stint in Ramsay Street".

After his brief 2022 return, Laura Denby from Radio Times expressed happiness that Tad was still "alive and well".
