= Nicholas Opolski =

Australian actor

- Occupation: Actor
- Years active: 1985–present

Nicholas Opolski is an Australian actor, who is best known for his role as Evan Hancock on the Australian soap opera Neighbours in 2001–2002. He has also played B2, one of the characters in the children's television show Bananas in Pyjamas for the ABC. He also worked as a presenter on another ABC Kids show Play School since 1992–1994. His hobbies are reading biographies, swimming, traveling and playing tennis.

== Filmography ==
=== Film ===
- I Can't Get Started (TV movie, 1985) as Nicholas
- For Love Alone (1986)
- The Facts of Life Down Under (TV movie, 1987)
- 13 Gantry Row (TV movie, 1998)
- Curtin (2007) as Fred McLaughlin

=== Television ===
- A Country Practice (1991)
- Bananas in Pyjamas (1992–2001) as B2 (voice)
- Play School (1992–94) as Presenter
- G.P. (1993)
- Water Rats (1998, S2 E7-8)
- BackBerner (2001)
- Neighbours (2001–02) as Evan Hancock
- Blue Heelers (2002)
- MDA (2003)
- Stingers (2004)
- Satisfaction (2007)
