= Anthony Hammer =

Australian actor (born 1986)

Anthony Hammer (born 1 March 1986) is an Australian actor. He played lead roles in Bootleg and Driven Crazy.

== Career ==
After a series of stage roles Hammer got the role of Ned in Driven Crazy at age 12. He followed this up with High Flyers the next year. He went on to play Leo Hancock on the Australian soap opera Neighbours in 2001–2002 and acted in The Secret Life of Us, The Saddle Club and We Jimmy. After this, he finished school and appeared in the UK as a main character in the 2002 BBC miniseries Bootleg, which was filmed in Melbourne over a three-month period. He has worked in the theatre too.
