= Tessa (novel) =

1997 novel by Margit Sandemo

- Author: Margit Sandemo
- Language: Swedish, Norwegian
- Genre: Crime novel
- Publisher: Boknöje AB
- Publication date: 1997
- Media type: Pocket book
- Pages: 142
- ISBN: 91-7710-940-6
- OCLC: 55079483

Tessa was a novel published by Margit Sandemo in 1997, though it was completed by 1970. She had originally planned to publish it as a serial in a Norwegian weekly magazine, but the editors of magazine abandoned it. The novel went missing for the next 25 years, until Sandemo found a copy in a cupboard in 1995. A short version of the story is used as part of the novel Selv om jeg elsker deg (1986).

== Plot ==
Tessa is the story of Tessa, a sixteen-year-old schoolgirl who has a vivacious imagination but is, in spite of this, a loner. Therefore, not many believed her when she said that thieves would break into a well-known family that night. But policeman Rikard Mohr took Tessa's information seriously - and it would soon turn out that she was not exaggerating this time. There is a crime or a riddle to solve in that novel, which is typical of Margit Sandemo. The story begins when a burglar makes a wrong phone number. He inadvertently calls Tessa and tells her about his upcoming crime. Tessa plans to check his intentions.
