= Jonathon Dutton =

Australian actor and director (born 1981)

- Born: 13 August 1981 (age 44); Geelong, Australia
- Occupations: Actor, director
- Years active: 1998–2022
- Spouse: Eve Morey (m. 2015)
- Children: 2

Jonathon Dutton (born 13 August 1981) is an Australian actor and director. From 1998 to 2002, Dutton played Tad Reeves in Neighbours. He later returned to the show as a director. Dutton has also appeared in MDA, Two Pints of Lager and a Packet of Crisps and Packed to the Rafters.

== Career ==
Dutton was born in Geelong. He had a small part in the Australian soap opera Neighbours, before going on to secure the regular role of Tad Reeves. He also made appearances in Thunderstone and Blue Heelers.

In 2003, Dutton played Brett Ferris in an episode of MDA. That same year he began appearing as David Fish in the British comedy series Two Pints of Lager and a Packet of Crisps. Dutton also portrayed Jeff in Australian drama series The Secret Life of Us. In 2006, the actor portrayed an ambulance driver in All Saints.

2009 saw Dutton make an appearance in Packed to the Rafters as Simon. In mid-2009, Dutton began a director's attachment with Neighbours, and from 2010, he began directing episodes of the serial. In 2012, he received a nomination for Best Direction in a TV Drama Serial from the Australian Directors Guild Awards for his work on Episode 6188.

In 2019, Dutton directed the Neighbours spin-off series Neighbours: Erinsborough High.

== Personal life ==
Dutton has been married to actress Eve Morey since 31 October 2015. Their first child, a daughter, was born in November 2014. During an appearance on The Wright Stuff in June 2017, Morey announced she was expecting her second daughter with Dutton.

== Filmography ==
=== Film ===
Year	Title	Role	Notes
2004	The Watch	Jonno	Short film

=== Television ===
Year	Title	Role	Notes
1998	Neighbours	Kenny Hyland	2 episodes
1998	Blue Heelers	Lucas Summers	Season 5, episode 13: "This Mortal Coil"
1998–2002, 2022	Neighbours	Tad Reeves	293 episodes
1999	Thunderstone	Morgan	Season 1, 6 episodes
2003	Blue Heelers	Kyle Madigan	Season 10, 2 episodes
2003	MDA	Brett Ferris	Season 2, episode 19: "Bigger Fish to Fry"
2003–2004	Two Pints of Lager and a Packet of Crisps	David Fish	Season 3–4, 12 episodes, including S3 E2: "Fish" – S4 E2: "Piggy Goes Oink"
2005	The Secret Life of Us	Jeff	Season 4, 9 episodes
2006	All Saints	Kane Hely	Season 9, 5 episodes
2009	Packed to the Rafters	Simon	Season 1, episode 16: "Having It All"
2009	Chandon Pictures	Harley	Season 2, episode 6: "Pack"
