= Dee Bliss =

Fictional character from the Australian soap opera Neighbours

- Neighbours character
- Portrayed by: Madeleine West
- Duration: 2000–2003, 2017, 2019–2020
- First appearance: 3 February 2000
- Last appearance: 25 June 2020
- Introduced by: Stanley Walsh (2000); Jason Herbison (2017)
- Spin-off appearances: Summer Stories (2017)
In-universe information
- Other names: Karen Hambley
- Occupation: Nurse
- Father: Peter Wilson
- Mother: Heather Schilling
- Adoptive father: John Bliss
- Adoptive mother: Magda Bliss
- Sisters: Andrea Somers; Cecile Bliss (adoptive)
- Husband: Darren Turner (1997); Toadfish Rebecchi (2003)
- Grandmothers: Nancy Bliss (adoptive)
- Nephews: Hugo Somers
- Nieces: Willow Somers

Dione "Dee" Bliss is a fictional character from the Australian soap opera Neighbours, played by Madeleine West. The actress received the role three days after securing an agent. West deferred her law degree studies to take the part. She made her first screen appearance during the episode broadcast on 3 February 2000. The character proved popular with viewers and producers soon promoted her to the main cast. West decided to leave Neighbours at the end of her contract in 2003. She filmed her final scenes in April and Dee made her last appearance on 29 July 2003.

West returned to the show in September 2016. Although initially introduced as Dee, it transpired that West was playing a new character Andrea Somers, a woman who impersonates Dee in an attempt to receive money from the Bliss family estate. Dee made a brief return on 9 January 2017, in a series of dream sequences experienced by her former husband Toadfish Rebecchi (Ryan Moloney). On 14 August 2017, West briefly appeared as Dee, though the identity of her character was left ambiguous at this point. In 2019, Dee's survival was confirmed and West reprised the role of Dee for a one-month period, as she comes face to face with Andrea for the first time, bonds with Toadie and learns the truth about her parentage. Dee returned once again from 23 April 2020 until 25 June 2020.

== Casting ==
West was enrolled in university studying law, when she decided to try acting and found an agent. She secured the role of Dee three days later. West said "It happened pretty quickly. I got the agent, then I went to the audition for Neighbours and luckily I got the part. I know it doesn't always happen that quickly for people, so I consider myself fortunate." West then deferred her law degree studies after she was offered the role. Dee became an audience favourite, so the Neighbours producers decided to make her a regular cast member and offered West a new contract.

In July 2002, West was struck by a bus. She needed re-constructive plastic surgery and was written out of Neighbours. West returned to the show a month later and said she was pleased to be back, but found it to be tiring. She said, "It was actually really good because it felt so nice to be back at work and to be not just lying in bed and doing nothing. It was so good to see everyone, so that really kept me occupied. But, I found that weekend that I just crashed and burned."

== Development ==
=== Relationships ===
==== Joel Samuels ====
Shortly after her arrival, Dee begins dating Joel Samuels (Daniel MacPherson) and their relationship progresses slowly. MacPherson said their relationship was "a little more lust than love" and when Dee introduces him to her best friend, Carrie Clark (Vanessa Rossini), Joel is instantly attracted to her. Joel tries to keep his feelings for Carrie a secret, as he does not want to hurt Dee, but MacPherson commented that it was not an easy thing to do and the truth would come out in the end. West empathised with Dee, saying that her character was "besotted" with Joel, so to find out he is attracted to Carrie would be an awful moment for her. Joel dates Carrie in secret and tries to choose between the two women, but Dee later catches him and Carrie in the pool at Number 30 and breaks up with him. Joel and Dee eventually reconcile, but their relationship is tested again by the arrival of Joel's father Bernie Samuels (Sean Scully). Bernie flirts with Dee, leaving her "just the slightest bit uncomfortable".

==== Darcy Tyler ====
In 2001, Dee was paired with local doctor Darcy Tyler (Mark Rafferty). Dee and Darcy's relationship becomes strained and Rafferty explained that Darcy was looking for some sympathy, as he had problems at the surgery, but Dee was "taking a harder line" instead of being supportive. Rafferty also said, "Darcy feels that his enthusiasm and hers don't quite match." Darcy seeks advice from Dee's friend Teresa Bell (Krista Vendy), who suggests that he does something romantic for Dee, so he buys them ballet tickets. However, Dee "brushes him off" and suggests that he takes Tess to the ballet instead. Darcy soon began an affair with Tess. While attending a fishing competition, Dee finds Darcy and Tess kissing inside his truck. Of the scene, West commented, "They are so caught up in each other that they don't even notice that she's there." Unsure how to react, Dee decided to leave the competition early. Dee confides in Joel and Toadie, who are surprised that she did not confront Darcy and Tess.

West explained that Dee wanted revenge and that would serve as her therapy. When Darcy came to see her, Dee pretended everything was okay, as she knew that it would be worth it when she exposed him and Tess as adulterers. West enjoyed the challenge that the plot brought her, saying "I was shocked when I first read the storyline, but I thought it was so dramatic that two best friends would be divided by a man." The actress also hoped that the storyline would have a positive impact on her character, as it was the second time she had been betrayed by her partner, following Joel's affair with her Carrie. West called Dee "too trusting" and thought she would be a changed person at the conclusion of the storyline.

Following the end of her relationship with Darcy, Dee learned she was pregnant with his child. An Inside Soap writer observed that her reaction was "one of shock and horror". With support from her friends, Dee accepts the pregnancy, but does not tell Darcy. Shortly after, Dee slips on some water and falls, landing hard on her stomach. She is rushed to the hospital, where Karl Kennedy (Alan Fletcher) informs her that she has suffered a miscarriage. West stated that Dee is "understandably devastated" by the news. She continued, "As a paediatric nurse, she loves children, and obviously it's deeply upsetting for any woman to lose her own child." While she is recovering, Darcy arrives at the hospital to begin his shift and West added that the last thing Dee needed was "a run-in" with Darcy. To remember the child, Dee plants a roe bush in Ramsay Street.

=== Departure ===
In March 2003, West announced that she was to leave Neighbours after her contract expired. She filmed her final scenes in early April. In her final storyline, Dee married her housemate and friend Toadfish Rebecchi (Ryan Moloney) in a "romantic ceremony", which ended in tragedy when Toadie accidentally drove their car off a cliff and into the sea. Dee's body was not found and Toadie was forced to accept that she had died. He initially blamed himself for causing her death. In 2014, series producer Jason Herbison admitted that he was asked every year if the show was going to bring back Dee. He told Bridget McManus and Scott Ellis of The Age that he was unsure if West would return to the role, and added that the writing team would have to come up with a different plot to the one that brought Harold Bishop (Ian Smith) back in 1996, following his disappearance in 1991.

=== Return ===
On 15 September 2016, Tiffany Dunk of News.com.au reported that West had reprised her role thirteen years after Dee's supposed death. West returned to filming that same week, with the role continuing through to January 2017. Of her decision to return, West stated, "It is a very rare and wonderful thing when an actor has the opportunity to step back into the shoes of a character they created, even more so when that character had not been seen for some 13 years, and was one as beloved as Dee Bliss. For me, this return to Neighbours is something of a homecoming, to the place where I took my first tentative steps into the entertainment industry, and where I truly learnt my craft."

In an interview with Daniel Kilkelly of Digital Spy, West said she had been asked to return to the show several times, but she had always been busy with her family and other acting work. When Dee and Toadie's wedding was voted viewers' second favourite Neighbours storyline for the 30th anniversary, West felt "honoured" and thought her return would be a chance to give something back to the fans, as well as allow her the chance to finish Dee's story. It was important to West that Dee's return storyline was plausible and while she was not initially aware of all the details, she thought that it was "really topical" and "juicy". She also speculated that Toadie would go through a range of emotions upon seeing Dee, including remorse and happiness. She continued, "There's going to be some really interesting and hard-hitting scenes for us both to play, along with everyone else in Ramsay Street who will feel the repercussions of Dee's return." West added that she would be filming for "a reasonable chunk of time" and that "the door is always left open."

West later told Holly Byrnes of The Daily Telegraph that she would be back for fourteen weeks. She also confirmed that Dee would definitely be back, and is not "a ghost, nor is she a figment of Toadie's imagination and she wasn't abducted by aliens." West added that she had plans to write and direct for Neighbours later in 2017. In the 2016 season finale episode, Toadie was shown a photograph of a woman that looked like Dee, leaving him with the possibility that Dee is alive. A trailer showcasing upcoming storylines showed Toadie appearing to meet Dee face to face. During the first episode of 2017, Toadie was shown to be "haunted" by dreams featuring Dee. It was later revealed that the returned Dee was in fact Andrea Somers, an imposter hoping to scam Toadie. After Andrea's exposure and departure, West made an unannounced return appearance on 14 August 2017. The closing credits concealed the character's name by crediting West as a "Special appearance", leading viewers to speculate that West was playing the real Dee. West wore "a flowing white dress", similar to Dee's wedding dress, and viewers also noted her long wavy hair, a style Dee sported shortly before her disappearance. The resolution of the storyline in 2019 confirmed that this appearance was of the real Dee. West continued to play Andrea intermittently from December 2017, again credited as special appearances; in 2018, a hospitalised and mentally unstable Andrea briefly claimed to be Dee once more.

On 5 July 2019, the show resolved the mystery of Dee's fate when she meets her lookalike Andrea Somers in "a dramatic showdown" on a cliff top in Byron Bay. Dee, who has spent the last 16–17 years using the name Karen, wants to know who Andrea is, but Andrea does not give much away. The women fight and Dee goes over the cliff, and Andrea returns to Erinsborough pretending to be her. Dee soon makes her way to Erinsborough and Toadie is faced with both women. Moloney said that Toadie is "totally stumped by it". Dee's time away from Erinsborough and what happened to her after the car crash was also explored. West stated, "the intervening 17 years have been very difficult and have changed the fibre of who she is, but at the end of the day, she's still that cheery, funny, well-meaning humanitarian minded Dee that we all came to love." West revealed that Dee and Andrea are twins, who were separated at birth. It was later confirmed that Dee was adopted and Heather is her biological mother. The character made her exit on 8 August 2019, as West's guest stint came to an end.

On 15 December 2019, Fiona Byrne of the Herald Sun confirmed that West would begin filming another guest stint in January 2020. West's return scenes aired on 21 April 2020, and she played both Dee and Andrea. Their return coincides with Elly Conway's (Jodi Anasta) trial for murder. Dee comes back to Erinsborough following a phone call from Toadie.

== Storylines ==
=== 2000–2003 ===
Dee and her friend Vanessa Bradshaw (Julieanne Tait) meet Joel Samuels and Toadfish Rebecchi in a bar. Joel pretends to be an Argentine football player, while Toadie pretends to be his lawyer. The girls play along with the charade, telling them that Dee is a model and Vanessa is a fashion designer. Dee and Vanessa go out to dinner with Joel and Toadie, but leave them in the restaurant without money to pay the bill. Dee is reunited with Joel when she comes to collect her younger sister, Cecile (Molly McCaffrey), from Ramsay Street. Dee and Joel meet at the local pub and decide that they want to get to know one another. They begin dating, but break up when he also dates her friend, Carrie Clark. Dee agrees to give their relationship another go, but it is tested when Joel's father, Bernie flirts with Dee, and her former boyfriend, Max Crawford (Simon Gleeson), tries to get back with her.

The character as she appeared in the 2000s

The couple play a series of practical jokes on one another. This comes to a climax when Joel fakes a letter from a noted art gallery, asking to put on an exhibition of Dee's work. He enlists his friend Malcolm Kennedy (Benjamin McNair) to pose as a distant relative, who is interested in Dee's paintings. Upon finding out that it was a joke, Dee breaks up with Joel. She moves into Number 32 Ramsay Street with Teresa Bell and begins a relationship with local doctor, Darcy Tyler. When Number 32 is put up for sale, Tess and Dee try to buy it, but are outbid. Dee then moves into Number 30, with Toadie and Joel. She breaks up with Darcy after learning he is having an affair with Tess. Dee finds out she is pregnant, but miscarries after a fall. Dee and Tess later repair their friendship and Dee reconciles with Joel. The relationship does not last, as Joel leaves on a diving expedition. She briefly dates new housemate Stuart Parker (Blair McDonough) and then his army friend Ray Milsome (Tom Meadmore), the latter of which tries to force himself on her but stops when Nina Tucker (Delta Goodrem) arrives. Toadie then publicly calls Ray out on his treatment of Dee and then he leaves.

Dee realises she has feelings for Toadie and they begin dating. Darcy conspires to break Toadie and Dee up with multiple schemes. Claiming to have turned over a new leaf, he plays the pair off against each other whilst pretending to be a sensitive confidant to both. He also learns Dee was married and invites her former husband, Darren Turner (Daniel Fletcher) to a charity ball. Darcy's plan is successful, and whilst paying Sindi Watts (Marisa Warrington) to flirt with Toadie and keep him away from Dee, Darcy persuades Dee to get back together with him. The relationship is short-lived however when she learns that he robbed his aunt and uncle, Susan Kennedy (Jackie Woodburne) and Karl Kennedy to pay illegal gambling debts. Dee and Toadie eventually reconcile and they get engaged. In the lead up to the wedding, Dee clashes with Toadie's mother Angie Rebecchi (Lesley Baker) and becomes a bridezilla. Dee and Toadie marry in front of their family members, friends and neighbours. As they are driving off together, Toadie and Dee take their eyes off the road to kiss, causing Toadie to lose control of the car. It veers off a cliff and crashes into the sea. Toadie manages to escape the car, but Dee's body is never recovered, despite efforts from rescue teams, and she is presumed dead.

=== 2017–2020 ===
Thirteen years later, Toadie and his new wife Sonya Rebecchi (Eve Morey) are scammed by a woman named Andrea Somers (West), who looks identical to Dee. A year after Andrea's con, Toadie tracks her down to a psychiatric facility in Tasmania. She eventually approaches the Rebecchis with a theory that Dee could be alive and living a new life as a woman named Karen. Andrea agrees to help Toadie find Dee, hoping that he will fall in love with her. Andrea reveals to her mother Heather Schilling (Kerry Armstrong) that Karen lives in Byron Bay. Wanting to ensure that Dee does not complicate Andrea's chances with Toadie, Heather arranges to meet Dee, but Andrea turns up instead to confront her lookalike. Andrea claims she is in love with Toadie, and when Dee decides to call Heather, Andrea pushes her off a cliff top. Dee is rescued by Heather, who tends to her injuries and keeps her in a motel room. Dee takes advantage of Heather's drunken state to convince her to go to Erinsborough, where she finds Andrea impersonating her. She convinces Toadie that she is the real Dee Bliss with the last words he said to her. Andrea and Heather are arrested, leaving Dee to explain why she faked her death.

Dee explains to Toadie their wedding car was tampered by a criminal gang, the Zantucks, who had placed her name on a hitlist shortly before the wedding. After the accident, Cecile's boyfriend, Riley Cooper (Lliam Murphy), rescued Dee and helped her start a new life as Karen, safe from the Zantucks. Constable Mark Brennan (Scott McGregor) discovers that the attempt on Dee's life was actually meant for Andrea, who dated one of the Zantucks. With the gang behind bars, Dee is free to resume her life. After briefly returning to Byron Bay, Dee returns at Toadie's invitation and stays with the Kennedys. Intrigued by Andrea's resemblance to her, Dee requests a DNA test, which reveals that Dee and Andrea are sisters. Heather is later confirmed to be their biological mother, but she was unaware she had given birth to twins and that Dee was given to the Blisses. Although she initially wants to remain in touch with Heather and Andrea, a prison visit indicates that while Heather was genuinely remorseful, Andrea had sole interest in having a connection to use as leverage for a shorter sentence. Thus, Dee decides to cut off contact with Andrea and Heather. As Toadie supports Dee with the revelations and her attempts to readjust to a normal life, their feelings for each other return. Still grieving for his wife Sonya, who had died due to ovarian cancer, Toadie panics when they kiss and Dee returns to Byron Bay. Toadie follows her and they agree that neither of them are ready for anything to happen, and they say their goodbyes.

Nearly a year later, Dee returns to Erinsborough to visit Andrea. Despite Toadie's reservations, Dee enjoys getting to know Andrea and decides to stay local while they reconnect. Dee and Toadie share a passionate kiss after they go fishing together and agree to try dating. When Karl sees how much Susan enjoys having Dee around, he invites her to move in with them. Unknown to both of them, however, was that Andrea wanted to use their connection as an advantage to regain custody of her son, Hugo Somers (John Turner). After overhearing Andrea tell other inmates about this, Andrea's cellmate, Elly Conway (Jodi Anasta), warns Dee and Toadie about her underhanded tactics and devious intentions. This also pushes her and Toadie closer together, and they eventually decide to start a relationship. She supports Toadie as he lodges an appeal regarding Elly's sentence, and later discovers that Andrea was involved in the scheme for Elly to lose custody of her daughter, Aster Conway (Isla Goulas, Scout Bowman) after Aster's grandmother, Claudia Watkins (Kate Raison), paid her to start a riot in the prison. Dee visits Andrea again to confront her, and she eventually confesses to her actions and why she has done them. Dee reveals what Claudia did with Aster, but Andrea shows no remorse for her actions. Furious, Dee berates Andrea for feigning emotions to secure a closer relationship with her for a personal advantage and requests that the latter stop acting so heartless towards others.

Dee later discovers that Heather is in the same prison and decides she wants to know her mother. Upon visiting her several times, Dee voices her belief that Heather has genuinely changed, much to Toadie's chagrin. He attempts to force Heather into cutting ties with Dee, much to her annoyance. Although they appear to work this out, Toadie once again tries to prevent Heather and Dee from having a relationship, but Dee tells him that he is the one being controlling and manipulative rather than Heather and questions their relationship. Toadie and Dee later break up, after which Dee asks Heather about her biological father. Dee learns her father's name, but ultimately decides not to investigate further. Owen Campbell (Johnny Ruffo) later manipulates Dee into coming to visit Heather in the prison garden, where he drugs her in order for Andrea to impersonate her again. Andrea is later remanded while trying to flee after kidnapping Hugo, and Heather asks to transfer to another prison. In the meantime, Toadie learns that Dee's father lives in Alaska and has terminal lung cancer. Upon learning this, Dee decides to meet her father as soon as possible. Toadie offers to come with her or wait for her to return, but she declines. After offering Andrea the opportunity to write to their father, Dee says an emotional goodbye to Toadie and leaves for Alaska.

== Reception ==
For her portrayal of Dee, West earned a nomination for Most Popular New Female Talent at the 2001 Logie Awards. In June 2002, Dee came fifth in a poll run by Newsround to find viewer's favourite Neighbours character. She received 9.37% of the vote. Dee and Toadie earned a nomination for Best Couple at the 2003 Inside Soap Awards. Jim Schembri of The Age said Dee was "Ramsay Street's reigning blonde beauty." While the Newcastle Herald called her "effervescent." The BBC said Dee's most notable moments were "When Darcy discovered she was secretly pregnant to him and had lost the child" and "Being killed on her wedding day."

The episode featuring Dee's death earned writer Shane Porteous the Australian Writers' Guild award for Best Episode in a Television Serial in 2003. In 2007, Australian newspaper the Herald Sun placed Dee's death from the car accident at number three on their list of Neighbours Top Ten moments. They said, "One of the more dramatic deaths was of Dee, played by Madeleine West. One of the soap's most loved characters, Toadie, was having the time of his life after marrying Dee, but tragedy struck as they drove off to their honeymoon, probably in Mildura. As Toadie leaned over to kiss Dee, he lost control of the car and drove off a cliff into the ocean. Toadie managed to get out of the car, but despite his anguished search, Dee's body was never found". The Daily Telegraph placed Dee and Toadie's wedding at number nine on their list of "Top 10 TV weddings". They said, "Happiness turns to tragedy when Toadie (Ryan Maloney) and Dee (Madeleine West) drive off a cliff on their wedding day and she is killed. He watches as her veil drifts away in the wind."

Sarah Megginson of SheKnows placed Dee and Toadie's wedding and her death on her list of "Most Memorable Neighbours Moments". She said viewers "beamed when the wedding celebrant announced that Dee and Toadie were married", but knew something was about to happen. She added "Toadie lost control of the car. They fly off a cliff and plunge into the ocean below ... and Toadie loses his bride mere hours into their marriage."

Daniel Kilkelly of Digital Spy expressed his surprise at Dee's apparent return in 2016, saying "it's the Neighbours news we never thought we'd hear and we couldn't be more excited about it". In 2019, Laura-Jayne Tyler of Inside Soap praised Dee's actual return, writing "We've seen a fair few soap characters come back from the dead in our time, but Neighbours' Dee turning up alive and well after 16 years has been our absolute favourite plot of the summer. Yes, we know some of the details don't quite add up, but the final twist – that Dee and Andrea are actually twins – is one of the most bonkers and brilliant things we've ever seen in soap. Neighbours, we salute you!" Dee was placed at number fifteen on the Huffpost's "35 greatest Neighbours characters of all time" feature. Journalist Adam Beresford described her as a "sweet natured nurse" who was "due a happy ending" and viewers always hoped she would return from the dead. Beresford was also impressed with the Dee and Andrea storyline, stating "this insanely OTT saga had it all and more. One of the most genuinely brilliant storylines of any soap, period." In 2022, Sam Strutt of The Guardian published a feature counting down the top ten most memorable moments in the history of Neighbours. Strutt listed "angelic" Dee's wedding and her subsequent disappearance at sea as the fifth most memorable. Strutt also likened Dee and Toadie's romance to the tale of The beauty and the beast.
