= List of Neighbours characters introduced in 1998 =

Neighbours is an Australian television soap opera created by Reg Watson. It was first broadcast on 18 March 1985. The following is a list of characters that first appeared in the serial in 1998, by order of first appearance. All characters were introduced by the show's executive producer Stanley Walsh. The 14th season of Neighbours began airing from 19 January 1998. Sally Upton was introduced during the following month. March saw the arrivals of Nicholas Atkins and Drew Kirk, while Joel Samuels and Veronica Olenski made their debuts in May. Karen Oldman and Mike Healey began appearing from August. Tad Reeves and Geri Hallett were both introduced during November.

== Sally Upton ==
Sally Upton
- Neighbours character
- Portrayed by: Sally Davis
- Duration: 1998–1999
- First appearance: 23 February 1998
- Last appearance: 22 January 1999
- Introduced by: Stanley Walsh
In-universe information
- Occupation: Student; Radio station assistant

Sally Upton, played by Sally Davis, made her first screen appearance on 23 February 1998. Three weeks prior to playing Sally, Davis made a guest appearance in the show as Alison Nova. Shortly after Sally's introduction, she became a love interest for Joel Samuels (Daniel MacPherson). The couple were initially not "on the same wavelength", but they became closer when Sally confided in Joel about her mother's death. Sally was "opinionated" and "quite pushy". Her green Volkswagen Beetle car was later owned by Libby Kennedy (Kym Valentine), Sally's one time love rival.

Sally works as an assistant at the Erinsborough University radio station UniFM, alongside Toadfish Rebecchi (Ryan Moloney). Toadie introduces Sally to his housemate Joel Samuels and she is instantly attracted to him. Joel initially finds Sally hard to work out, but they soon begin dating. Sally opens up to Joel about the death of her mother and they become closer, but when Sally notices the closeness between Joel and Libby Kennedy, she becomes jealous and suspects Joel has feelings for Libby. Sally and Joel also fall out over Libby and Sarah Beaumont (Nicola Charles), as Sally had made friends with Sarah and did not understand the bad feelings between Sarah and Libby's family. Sally has difficulty dealing with the anniversary of her mother's death and her heightened emotions cause her to reject Joel's attempts at sympathy. She then accuses Joel of cheating on her and ends their relationship.

Weeks later, Sally runs into Drew Kirk (Dan Paris) at the local pub and they decide to go and see a movie together. While Drew goes to change, Sally waits downstairs for him. However, she then bursts into his room and tries to kiss him. Drew rejects her as he is friends with Joel. After Joel ends up in the hospital, things between Sally and Drew become awkward, especially as Joel believes Sally still has feelings for him. Sally plays along, as she is worried that rejecting Joel might affect his recovery. When she begins to struggle with the charade, Sally tells Joel that she cannot see him anymore and leaves.

A writer for the BBC's official Neighbours website said Sally's most notable moment was "rushing in on Drew when he was changing and attempting to kiss him."

== Nicholas Atkins ==
Nicholas Atkins
- Neighbours character
- Portrayed by: Jason Crewes
- First appearance: 12 March 1998
- Last appearance: 24 June 1998
- Introduced by: Stanley Walsh
In-universe information
- Occupation: Teacher
- Brothers: Ben Atkins (adoptive)
- Sisters: Caitlin Atkins

Nicholas "Nick" Atkins, played by Jason Crewes, made his first appearance on 12 March 1998. Crewes was appearing on fellow soap opera Breakers at the same time as he was appearing in Neighbours. His character was the third member of the Atkins family to be introduced. Nick immediately causes upset when he "comes down heavy" on his young sister Caitlin Atkins (Emily Milburn), after catching her with her boyfriend. One of Nick's first storylines saw him pretend to be Toadfish Rebecchi (Ryan Moloney). Another notable storyline saw him accused of assault. When the charges were dropped, it left Nick "feeling bitter about the experience" and wondering whether he should accept more work at Erinsborough High.

The character's departure was confirmed in the 23–29 May 1998 issue of TV Week. Nick and Caitlin depart Neighbours at the same time to return to Adelaide. The siblings have "a cheeky farewell" after Caitlin paints a goodbye message on the road to make sure the residents do not forget them in a hurry. Their exit aired on 24 June 1998. Tony Johnston, author of Neighbours: 20 Years of Ramsay Street, branded Nicholas "handsome". Peter Grant of the Liverpool Echo called him a "big bad brother". While Stephen Murphy from Inside Soap thought Nick and his sister "made a big impact in Erinsborough".

Nick arrives in Erinsborough to look after his younger sister, Caitlin. He arrives just as Caitlin tries to run away with her boyfriend, Josh Hughes (Sullivan Stapleton). Nick argues with his brother Ben (Brett Cousins) over Caitlin, as they both feel that they can care for her better than the other. Karen Oldman (Pia Miranda), a fan of Toadie's, comes over and mistakes Nick for Toadie. As Toadie is worried that Karen will be disappointed to see the real him, he convinces Nick to pretend to be him for a while longer. Nick is uncomfortable with the deception, but goes along with it. He is relieved when Toadie later reveals himself to Karen. Nick finds himself in charge of Caitlin when Ben moves away. He gets himself a job teaching at Erinsborough High and settles into the neighbourhood.

Nick befriends his colleague Jacquie Boyd (Amy Lapin), which upsets Caitlin, as she dislikes her. When student Mickey Dalton (Trent Fowler) falls out with Paul McClain (Jansen Spencer), a fight breaks out between them and Nick tries to break it up. Mickey takes a fall and hurts his ankle, leading his mother, Jean (Joanne Canning) to sue Nick for assaulting her son. Nick is then suspended from the school. After his name is cleared, Nick is allowed to return to the school, but he admits that he is not sure he wants to continue teaching. When Nick and Caitlin's mother returns from the Middle East, Nick tells his sister that they are going home to Adelaide. Despite Caitlin's protests, they leave Erinsborough.

== Drew Kirk ==
Drew Kirk, played by Dan Paris, made his first screen appearance on 27 March 1998. Neighbours was the first television show Paris auditioned for. He won the role of Drew straight away. He was contracted until March 2002. Drew is a country boy who previously worked on a farm in Oakey, before coming to Erinsborough. Drew replaced Ben Atkins (Brett Cousins) at Carpenter Mechanics. James Joyce of the Newcastle Herald said Drew was a "suitably spunky rival" for Ben. Denise Everton from the Illawarra Mercury thought Drew was "nice, naive and gorgeous." Drew was known for his long hair, which gave him a "hippy look". Paris was banned from cutting his hair by the producers.

== Joel Samuels ==
Joel Samuels, played by Daniel MacPherson, made his first screen appearance on 13 May 1998. MacPherson auditioned for the show's casting director, Jan Russ, who then approached the producers and suggested they create the role of Joel for him. MacPherson joined the cast when he was seventeen. He relocated to Melbourne from Sydney for filming. Annette Dasey from Inside Soap said Joel was "good-looking, down-to-earth, friendly and a champion triathlete." She also branded him a "heart-throb", but MacPherson said Joel was unlucky in love, mostly due to his naivety. For his portrayal of Joel, MacPherson received a nomination for Most Popular New Male Talent at the 1999 Logie Awards.

== Veronica Olenski ==
Veronica Olenski
- Neighbours character
- Portrayed by: Caroline Lloyd
- Duration: 1998–2009
- First appearance: 18 May 1998
- Last appearance: 29 October 2009
- Introduced by: Stanley Walsh
In-universe information
- Occupation: Doctor; Gynaecologist
- Husband: Greg Michaels

Veronica Olenski, played by Caroline Lloyd, made her first screen appearance on 18 May 1998. Lloyd appeared in the semi-regular role of Dr. Olenski for eleven years. A notable storyline for Veronica saw the introduction of her husband Greg Michaels (Nick Farnell) and his subsequent affair with Veronica's patient Stephanie Scully (Carla Bonner). Greg told Steph that he and Veronica had separated, despite the fact that they still lived together. Greg admitted that he cared for Veronica, but no longer loved her. When Steph attended a charity meeting, she received "short shrift" from Veronica who was the charity's chairwoman. Steph's young son was later injured in an accident and Veronica had to put her feelings aside to treat him.

Dr. Veronica Olenski works as a doctor and gynaecologist at Erinsborough Hospital. Her first patient is competitive swimmer Caitlin Atkins (Emily Milburn), who she treats for exhaustion. A few months later, Dr. Olenski informs Joel Samuels (Daniel MacPherson) that he has damaged the ligaments in his knee, and it is unlikely that he will ever be able to compete in triathlons again. Dr. Olenski treats Craig "Pinhead" Pinders (Nathan Godkin), Libby Kennedy (Kym Valentine) and Brendan Bell (Blair Venn) when they involved in road accidents. The following year, Dr. Olenski helps to deliver Libby's son and saves her life when she goes into cardiac arrest. Dr. Olenski also helps to deliver Oscar Scully (Ingo Dammer-Smith), Ashley Thomas (Amielle Lemaire) and Charlie Hoyland (Aaron Aulsebrook-Walker). That same year, Dr. Olenski becomes responsible for the care of Izzy Hoyland (Natalie Bassingthwaighte). Dr. Olenski accidentally gives away Izzy's pregnancy secret when she leaves a message on the Hoyland house phone about an ultrasound appointment.

Dr. Olenski is forced to deliver Sky Mangel's (Stephanie McIntosh) baby during a fire at the hospital, due to Sky's advanced labour. Once the baby is born, Dr. Olenski moves them to another part of the hospital. Six months later, Dr. Olenski treats Pepper Steiger (Nicky Whelan) for stage 2 cervical dysplasia and incorrectly diagnosis Susan Kennedy (Jackie Woodburne) with the menopause, when she is really suffering from Multiple sclerosis. When Carmella Cammeniti suffers pains during her pregnancy, she is rushed to hospital where Dr. Olenski performs an ultrasound and assures Carmella that there is nothing to be alarmed about. Carmella later goes into premature labour and Dr. Olenski delivers her daughter by caesarean section. During Rosetta Cammeniti (Natalie Saleeba) and Frazer Yeats's (Ben Lawson) first ultrasound, Dr. Olenski cannot find their baby's heartbeat and believes that Rosie has experienced a false pregnancy. Frazer later asks Dr. Olenski if there is a chance that Rosie could still be pregnant, and she offers to perform another ultrasound. Dr. Olenski finds a heartbeat and tells Rosie and Frazer that they are expecting a baby after all.

When Dr. Olenski runs into Stephanie Scully at the hospital, she admits that she is having a tough day as her husband, Greg, has left her for another woman. Steph then admits that she is the other woman and Veronica slaps her. They exchange heated words at a breast cancer charity meeting, of which Veronica is the chairperson. When Charlie is injured, Veronica is forced to treat him and she calls a truce with Steph. However, she is upset when she later sees Steph hugging Greg and freezes her joint bank account. Steph tells Veronica that she is being unfair, but Veronica refuses to listen. Veronica lashes out at Steph and they get into a physical fight. Veronica later apologises and asks Greg for another chance, but he turns her down. When Susan plans to act as a surrogate for her daughter, Dr. Olenski warns her that the physical strain could cause a serious relapse of her MS. The local newspaper soon gets hold of the story and Dr. Olenski tells Susan's husband, Karl (Alan Fletcher), that the hospital are not happy with the media attention. She also offers to fight the hospital's CEO over his opposition to IVF. Not long after, Dr. Olenski carries out the IVF procedure on Susan and treats a newborn India Napier (Alia and Gabriella De Vercelli).

== Karen Oldman ==
Karen Oldman
- Neighbours character
- Portrayed by: Pia Miranda
- Duration: 1998–1999
- First appearance: 24 August 1998
- Last appearance: 7 April 1999
- Introduced by: Stanley Walsh
In-universe information
- Occupation: Student

Karen Oldman, played by Pia Miranda, made her first screen appearance on 13 August 1998. Neighbours marked Miranda's first television role, three years after she graduated from drama school. She admitted that her first day on set was embarrassing, as a tampon fell out of her bag and into her co-star Todd MacDonald's (Darren Stark) lap during their first meeting. Miranda found Neighbours to be a good training ground for her acting skills, saying "It's fantastic training because I never forget my lines. After being on Neighbours you are so used to getting reels and reels of script, and you are used to working under heaps of pressure." Karen was Toadfish Rebecchi's (Ryan Moloney) "first big romance", so he was devastated when he discovered she was having an affair.

Karen is a first year student at Eden Hills University. She listens to Toadfish Rebecchi's radio show on UniFM and mistakes Nick Atkins (Jason Crewes) for Toadie. As Toadie is too shy to meet Karen, he and Nick stage a ruse that Nick is Toadie and Nick dates Karen for a while. Eventually, the truth is revealed and Karen is angry with both guys, but decides to give things a go with Toadie.

During a meal with Toadie's housemate Sarah Beaumont (Nicola Charles), Karen finds herself attracted to Sarah's boyfriend Alex Fenton (Guy Hooper) and they leave together when Toadie and Sarah start bickering. When confronted, Karen and Alex admit that they have been seeing each other and their respective relationships end. However, Karen returns several weeks later and she and Toadie reconcile. Toadie suggests Karen pilot his and Lou Carpenter's (Tom Oliver) flying machine in order to win money to go away to Bali, but she refuses after a mishap involving a helium doll version of her floating away. Karen does test a newer flying machine, but is unsuccessful in winning the money. Karen tells Toadie she is moving to New Zealand with her family. They agree to try to keep things going long distance, but Karen ends the relationship during a phone call several months later, breaking Toadie's heart.

== Mike Healey ==
Mike Healey
- Neighbours character
- Portrayed by: Andrew Blackman
- Duration: 1998–1999
- First appearance: 17 August 1998
- Last appearance: 5 April 1999
- Introduced by: Stanley Walsh
In-universe information
- Occupation: University lecturer Newspaper editor
- Mother: Bianca Healey
- Wife: Victoria Healey
- Daughters: Sasha Healey

Mike Healey, played by Andrew Blackman, made his first appearance on 17 August 1998. Mike was introduced as a love interest for Libby Kennedy (Kym Valentine). Mike faced disapproval from Libby's family, as he was her university lecturer and several years older than her. The couple faced further problems when Libby learned Mike regularly spent social time with his estranged wife. Valentine commented "She understands Mike and his wife have to keep in touch as they have a child together, but she can't help but fear the worst." Valentine added that as the relationship continued, there would be "a lot of drama" as they were confronted with further crises. A writer for the BBC's Neighbours website believed Mike's most notable moment was "getting his ex-wife pregnant whilst he was seeing Libby." A columnist for Inside Soap quipped, "Mike is just the latest in a long line of rotters who caused Libby heartache over the years."

While lecturing at Eden Hills University, Mike is attracted to his student Libby Kennedy and they begin dating. The couple decide to keep their relationship a secret, due to their age difference and the problems Mike could encounter at the university. When Libby lies that she is horse-riding, and is reported missing from the group, she is forced to come clean about her relationship with Mike. Her family hold a dinner party in order to meet Mike. Libby's father Karl (Alan Fletcher) is not pleased that Mike is dating his daughter, especially when he learns that Mike has a young daughter of his own. Mike introduces Libby to his daughter, Sasha (Chelsea Driessen), which causes her to have second thoughts about their relationship. Mike reassures Libby that he does not have feelings for his ex-wife, Victoria (Tamar Kelly), but Libby is uneasy when she learns Mike still socialises with Victoria. To prove his love for Libby, Mike rents Number 32 and they become closer.

While Libby is at Mike's house, his mother Bianca (Joy Mitchell) calls by and tells Libby that she cannot replace Victoria. When Mike learns what Bianca said, he tells Libby that he has spoken to his mother and assures her there is no problem. However, it soon emerges that Mike only said that to placate Libby and Bianca had not changed her opinion. Libby manages to bond with Sasha, but Mike's behaviour towards Libby starts to change. Drew Kirk (Dan Paris) catches Mike cheating on Libby with Victoria. Drew confronts Mike and punches him. Drew does not tell Libby, as he does not want to upset her, and she continues to date Mike. Libby then told Mike he needed to formally divorce Victoria if they were to resume their relationship, which was initially accepted by both him and Victoria. When Sasha tells Libby that Victoria is expecting another baby, Libby realises that Mike has been cheating on her and she ends their relationship. Mike tries to win her back, but she refuses, knowing she will always come second in his life. Mike then moves out of Number 32.

== Tad Reeves ==
Wayne "Tad" Reeves, played by Jonathon Dutton, made his first screen appearance on 16 November 1998. Producers began casting for the role of Tadpole, Toadfish Rebecchi's (Ryan Moloney) younger cousin, as they needed a new "rascal" character because Toadie had grown up. Dutton had previously appeared in Neighbours in a small guest role, before he won the role of Tad. Dutton was sixteen when he joined the show and he had a tutor on set, so he could keep up with his schooling. Denise Everton from the Illawarra Mercury thought Tad was "outgoing". Dutton admitted to her that one of his hardest storylines to film was when Tad learned that he was adopted.

== Geri Hallett ==
Geri Hallett
- Neighbours character
- Portrayed by: Isabella Dunwill
- Duration: 1998–2001
- First appearance: 25 November 1998
- Last appearance: 28 February 2001
- Introduced by: Stanley Walsh
In-universe information
- Occupation: Journalist

Geri Hallett, played by Isabella Dunwill, made her first appearance on 25 November 1998. Dunwill was initially contracted for a two week guest role, but she believed the writers "saw something" in her performance and they kept bringing her character back. Dunwill said she was "thrilled" as Geri was "fun to play." She also admitted that she would love her role to become more permanent.

Geri was billed as a "bad girl character", while Dunwill described her as "a troublemaker, she's manipulative, and she'll stop at nothing to get what she wants." Geri causes friction between couple Drew Kirk (Dan Paris) and Libby Kennedy (Kym Valentine), after developing a grudge against Libby because she won Drew's affections. Dunwill explained "While Geri pretends she's not jealous, there's an underlying bitterness. She wants to get revenge on Libby." The character's revenge plan involves securing a job at the Erinsborough News, which Dunwill called "Libby's domain", and dating Libby's boss Simon in order to get ahead of her rival. This results in Geri receiving a byline on her first story, which took Libby two years to get. Valentine said Libby's "blood is boiling" over Geri's actions and when she complains to Drew, he tells her that she is worried about nothing, causing friction between them. Valentine and Dunwill were good friends off-screen, and Dunwill found the scenes between their characters "a lot of fun". Dunwill expected the public to dislike her character and she was warned that she might have "bricks thrown through my windows", however, people told her that they enjoyed watching "a nasty character."

Geri attends Eden Hills University and shares the same journalism course with Libby Kennedy. The two girls frequently clash. Matters are not helped when Geri begins dating Drew Kirk, who Libby previously rejected after he declared his feelings for her. Geri confronts Drew about his feelings for her and when he cannot give her a straight answer, she realises he still loves Libby and the relationship ends. Geri becomes Toadfish Rebecchi's (Ryan Moloney) co-host at UniFM and he plots to have her fired, as he dislikes her. Toadie discovers Geri is being paid to appear on the volunteer radio station, and while investigating further, he learns that Geri is receiving bribes in exchange for promoting local businesses. Toadie tells Libby, who publishes the story in a magazine, resulting in Geri being sacked. Geri causes more trouble when she spreads rumours about Drew seeing Libby's friend Stephanie Scully (Carla Bonner) after noticing Steph's attraction towards Drew. However Libby and Steph set up Geri to expose her muckraking: Steph deliberately gives the impression of affection to Drew while Geri was watching, with Geri gossiping to Libby as predicted. Libby and Steph found this amusing, though Drew was annoyed at being involved in the setup. She increases Libby's ire by publishing Libby's rejection of Drew's marriage proposal in her Erinsborough News column, but Libby retaliates by exposing Geri's practice of accepting bribes from local businesses in return for free plugs on her UniFM radio show. Following Libby and Drew's wedding, they run into Geri on the Gold Coast during their honeymoon. Geri takes photos of them for the paper and continues to seemingly follow them around all day. This 2001 storyline was her last appearance on the show.

== Others ==
Date(s)	Character	Actor	Circumstances
19 January–20 February	Dr. Shepherd	Drew Tingwell	Dr. Shepherd treats Ben Atkins after he is involved in a serious car crash. Dr. Shepherd informs Ben's mother, Ruth, that Ben has a depressed fracture of the skull, which is pressing on his temporal lobe, and he is going to operate. Following the surgery, Dr. Shepherd tells Ruth, Philip Martin and Caitlin Atkins that Ben is breathing alone, but it is too soon to know how what kind of recovery he will make. Dr. Shepherd treats Madge Bishop the following month, after she falls down some stairs and needs an aneurysm removing.
20 January–17 March	Geoff Burke	Andrew McKaige	Geoff is a former boyfriend of Ruth Wilkinson and the father of their son Ben Atkins. He visits a comatose Ben in hospital following a crash at Calder Park Raceway during a race. He talks to Ben and tells him who he is. Ben awakes and has no memory of this and Ruth warns Geoff to stay away. When Ben finds out the truth, he is upset and rejects Geoff at first, however he decides to give him a chance and they bond. Geoff coaches Ben's adoptive sister Caitlin with her swimming. He shows Ben a video of the crash during Ben's recovery, which freaks Ben out and angers Ruth. Geoff explains he showed Ben the video in order to get him to face his fears. Ben accepts his apology and Geoff offers him a job at his garage in Sydney. Ben is reluctant to leave at first after only having just found Ruth, but decides to go with his father to get to know him better.
9 February 1988–24 June 1999	Shannon Jones	Diana Glenn	Shannon is a single mother, who befriends Toadfish Rebecchi when they meet at a playgroup when Toadie takes Louise Carpenter there. Toadie develops a crush on Shannon and she agrees to go to the university ball with him. Toadie believes that she has feelings for him and tries to kiss her. Shannon rejects him, and at the ball, she kisses Darren Stark, who is dating Libby Kennedy. Shannon and Darren's kiss is taped by Paul McClain and Hannah Martin and when Libby sees the video, she breaks up with Darren. The following year, a fire destroys Shannon's house and the locals try to help her. Drew Kirk spends time with Shannon and her son, Brian, even offering them a room at Number 22. Drew and Shannon go on a couple of dates, but she realises that he does not have feelings for her and she eventually moves back to her newly repaired house.
9 February 1998–7 June 1999	Brian Jones	Joshua Wojniusz	
5 February	Alison Nova	Sally Davis	Alison is Perry Pinchen's girlfriend. She laughs when she learns that Amy Greenwood has enlisted Perry's services in order to make Lance Wilkinson jealous enough to do ballroom dancing with her.
16 February–7 July	Kim Howard	Paul Dawber	Kim is a teacher at the High School in Wangaratta where Susan Kennedy takes a temporary position. They share a house together and build up a friendship. Kim visits Erinsborough several months later and supports Susan when she discovers her husband Karl kissed Sarah Beaumont, who Kim previously dated and suggests Susan return to country with him for several days, which she does before returning home.
18 February–17 March	Josh Hughes	Sullivan Stapleton	Josh begins training with the Erinsborough swimming team and dates Caitlin Atkins. When the couple decide to skip swimming class and spend the day together, Josh falls and sprains his arm during a play fight. It soon emerges that Josh is exaggerating his injury, so he can escape from training and spend more time with Caitlin. Josh and Caitlin soon find themselves in trouble, particularly from Caitlin's brother, Nick, and they decide to run away. They do not get very far and return home, realising they cannot cope on their own.
26–27 February	Kenny Hyland	Jonathon Dutton	Kenny is a member of Harold Bishop's scout troop. He and Paul McClain race ahead on a hike much to Harold's chagrin. When Kenny wants to take a closer look at a lizard he sees, he falls into a ravine, injuring himself. Harold acts quickly and saves Kenny.
23 March 1998–18 November 2003	Tony Simpson	Stan Tsitas	Tony is the station manager of Eden Hills University's radio station UniFM.
30 March–15 June	Mickey Dalton	Trent Fowler	Mickey is Paul McClain and Hannah Martin's classmate. When Mickey falls out with Paul, he frames him for shoplifting at the Coffee Shop. A fight breaks out and their teacher Nicholas Atkins tries to break it up, resulting in Mickey taking a fall and hurting his ankle. Mickey's mother, Jean sues Nick for assault and he is suspended from teaching. Paul and Hannah make sure the truth comes out and Nick is allowed to return to work.
23–28 April	Declan Hewitt	Chris Milne	Declan is Libby Kennedy's guest lecturer, who previously had a brief relationship with her mother, Susan Kennedy, while they were at university together. Libby becomes infatuated with Declan, and Susan is concerned that he has always been a womaniser. Susan convinces Libby that Declan is not worth her interest, and Libby publicly exposes his true nature. Milne previously played Philip Martin in 1985.
27 April–12 June	Jacquie Boyd	Amy Lapin	Jacquie is a teacher at Erinsborough High and Nicholas Atkins's colleague. Nick's younger sister, Caitlin, a student of Jacquie's, is annoyed that she is spends so much time with her brother. Jacquie later stands by Nick when he is accused of assaulting Mickey Dalton.
5 May–29 October	Lily Madigan	Alethea McGrath	An elderly Lily befriends Anne Wilkinson and Libby Kennedy when they help her fight a corporation who want to buy her house and knock it down to build on the land. Lily grows close to Anne. A few months later, Anne learns Lily is in hospital and starts visiting her. Lily later dies and leaves Anne her house in her will.
20 May–6 October	Mark Sindon	Marc Stafford	Mark is a student at Erinsborough High. He asks Hannah Martin to be his date and she accepts. They begin dating for a while, but break up ahead of Hannah's departure for France.
22 May 1998–13 July 2001	Ryan Moller	Pieter Siertsema	Moller is a local police officer. He investigates a threat against Libby Kennedy and brings Nicholas Atkins to the police station to answer questions of an alleged assault on Mickey Dalton. Following promotion to Sergeant, Moller questions Harold Bishop over a robbery in Tasmania and questions Toadfish Rebecchi over a theft allegedly inspired by his radio show. He also helps with the search for Emily Hancock when she goes missing from her home.
12–15 June	Jean Dalton	Joanne Canning	Jean is Mickey Dalton's mother. She arrives at Erinsborough High to lodge an assault complaint against teacher Nicholas Atkins, after he breaks up a fight between Mickey and Paul McClain, and accidentally causes Mickey to fall and injure his ankle. Jean accuses Nick of being out to get Mickey and threatens legal action and decides to withdraw Mickey from the school, but Mickey, not wanting to leave his friends, confesses that Nick is innocent and Nick is reinstated.
17 June–26 November	Maddie Harford	Karly Drever	Maddie is a Year 12 classmate of Billy Kennedy, Amy Greenwood, Lance and Anne Wilkinson. She attends Lance and Anne's 17th birthday party and dares Lance and Caitlin Atkins to kiss for a full minute, which upsets Amy. Maddie later attends a camping trip with the others.
17 June 1998–16 November 2000	Craig "Pinhead" Pinders	Nathan Godkin	Pinhead is a student of Erinsborough High, who has been left back on multiple occasions. He is nominated for school captain, but loses out to Anne Wilkinson and Amy Greenwood, who become co-captains. When Bill Kennedy returns to repeat Year 12 after dropping out of university, Pinhead goads him. When Pinhead and Bill play basketball, things get rough and Pinhead is injured as a result. When Ruth Wilkinson suspects Pinhead's father, Graham of committing incapacity benefit fraud, he is angered. Pinhead enters a flying machine competition, but is unsuccessful as he is the first to fail. When Bill and Anne spend the night together, Pinhead tries to get details, but Bill shuts him down, underplaying the event, which upsets Anne who overhears. Pinhead and Lance Wilkinson are injured in a car accident when a lorry hits their car and Pinhead suffers a broken arm. He recovers and then trains to be a primary school teacher.
18 June–5 February 1999	Janine Sumner	Caroline Wilson	Janine is a real estate agent who suggests that Karl Kennedy sell his home Number 28 as the market is good. She comes over to value the property much to the annoyance of Karl's family. Several months later, Janine inspects Number 30 when the property is to be sold.
30 June–1 July	Fred Parkes	Colin Duckworth	Anne Wilkinson interviews Fred for a school sociology project. Anne is surprised that Fred lives in a homeless shelter, as he is well dressed. Fred is positive about his situation and Anne agrees to talk to him again. Fred explains that he was a gambling addict, his wife walked out on him, and he lost his home and job. Feeling like she owed Fred something for talking to her, Anne asks him to her house for dinner. Anne goes to the kitchen to turn the oven on and when she returns to the living room, she discovers Fred has died. Anne later decides to attend Fred's funeral.
1 July–18 November	Patrick Greenwood	Matthew Barnes	Patrick is Amy Greenwood's younger brother. He and Paul McClain decide to work on a flying machine together and test out various equipment and end up breaking a window in the process. Patrick hides out at Number 32 and is discovered by Hannah Martin, who agrees to keep it a secret, but Amy finds out and wants answers. Patrick explains to Amy that his advanced high school is too pressured and he feels lonely. Their mother, Josie, comes to collect him. Patrick later goads Paul about his designs for the flying machine and pushes Paul too far when he mocks his recovering alcoholic father, Leo. Paul punches Patrick and a fight ensues, but Drew Kirk breaks it up. On the day of the contest, Patrick's attempt fails miserably and he instantly falls into the water.
16 July–28 September	Alex Fenton	Guy Hooper	Alex is a psychiatrist at Erinsborough Hospital. He tends to Adam Sherry, a post-traumatic house fire victim and impressed when Sarah Beaumont gets Adam to communicate. Alex asks Sarah to dinner. They begin a relationship, but Sarah is dismayed when she finds out Alex has been seeing Karen Oldman and promptly ends things with him.
20 July 1998–18 February 1999	Leo McClain	Ross Thompson	Leo is Paul McClain's estranged father, who turns up on Ramsay Street to see his son. Paul and Leo argue when they come face-to-face, with Paul attacking his father for suffering he caused his mother. Leo apologises and insists that has changed and has beaten his alcoholism. Paul runs away, but on his return, he decides to give Leo a chance. They meet up to talk and Leo explains the circumstances that led to his alcoholism and his abusive behaviour towards Paul and his mother. Paul agrees to stay in touch when Leo leaves town to work on a fishing trawler.
27 July–3 August	Denny Cook	Kate Ditchburn	A transfer student from Eden Hills Grammar. Principal Susan Kennedy asks Hannah Martin and Zoe Tan to help make Denny feel welcome at Erinsborough High. Despite Hannah and Zoe's best efforts, Denny is constantly negative. Hannah catches Denny spraying graffiti on a wall near Carpenter's Mechanics and confronts her, but Denny shoves her to the floor and sprays her. Denny frames Hannah for some graffiti outside a local hall, but the truth is discovered when Susan finds the paint in Denny's locker.
28 July–27 October	Josie Greenwood	Sally Keil	Josie is the mother of Amy Greenwood and her brothers Jeff and Patrick. She arrives to collect Patrick from Number 26 when she finds out he has been hiding out in Ramsay Street and calls for Philip Martin's resignation from the school committee after his failure to insure some school computers that are vandalised.
29 July 1998–24 May 1999	Shelley Hanson	Jane Allsop	Shelley and her fiancé, Ray, come to Erinsborough to visit her ex-boyfriend Drew Kirk. An embarrassed Drew asks Libby Kennedy to pretend to be his girlfriend for the night. The following year, Drew and Libby go to the Oakey Rodeo and meet up with Ray and Shelley. Shelley is heavily pregnant and, just as Libby and Drew are about to share their first kiss, she goes into labour in the middle of the rodeo ball. Drew and Libby visit Shelley, Ray and their daughter, Ruby, in the hospital the following morning.
29 July 1998–24 May 1999	Ray Hanson	Ren De Haas	
5–12 August	Hilary Grant	Olivia Hamnett	When Madge Bishop joins the local women's basketball team, she takes an instant dislike to Hilary and her sister Portia Grant.
7 September 1998–1 April 1999	Sasha Healey	Chelsea Driessen	Sasha is Mike Healey's daughter. When Mike begins dating Libby Kennedy, she initially struggles to develop a relationship with Sasha, but they eventually start to form a bond. Sasha later tells Libby that her mother, Victoria, is pregnant, leading to the end of Mike and Libby's relationship.
10–15 September	Graham Pinders	Jim Daly	Graham is the father of Craig "Pinhead" Pinders and a physiotherapy patient of Ruth Wilkinson. He complains of back pain and wants Ruth to sign some forms but Ruth's husband Philip is convinced Graham is faking his pain in order to play the system.
11 September–6 October	Richard Downing	John Arnold	Sarah Beaumont becomes worried when she notices a strange man following her. She soon realises she has a stalker. Richard makes himself known to her and Sarah realise that he is a patient from the hospital, who had been on the psychiatric ward. Richard is grateful to Sarah when she talks to him. After Richard is arrested, Sarah sees him at the police station and drops the charges, as she cannot blame him for his actions.
30 September 1998–26 July 2006	Joanna Douglas	Matilda White	Joanna is a local police officer. She investigates a break-in at Erinsborough High and later questions Harold Bishop about a series of armed robberies in Tasmania, when an e-fit that looks like him is circled around. Joanna questions Stuart Parker about assaulting Marc Lambert and searches for Susan Kennedy when she disappears. The following year, Joanna questions Toadfish Rebecchi about a car accident, that led to the death of Dee Bliss, and investigates a robbery at Harold's house. When Toadie goes missing, Joanna reassures his mother that he is okay as he has been using his credit cards. Stuart later joins the police force, but when his eyesight is damaged, Joanna tells him that there are not a lot of jobs for visually impaired people. She assures him the force will not abandon him and tries to find him something to do.
1 October 1998–25 March 1999	Portia Grant	Sue Ingleton	When Madge Bishop joins the local women's basketball team, she takes an instant dislike to Portia and her sister Hilary Grant. Portia is the team coach and she becomes jealous of Madge's popularity. Madge decides to run for team coach, but Portia intimidates the team members from voting for her. Madge captains the team when Portia is injured. Portia later considers buying Number 30 and opens the Grease Monkeys café.
14 October 1998–9 October 2000	Tuong Pham	Trent Huen	Tuong is a first year law classmate of Toadfish Rebecchi. They face off in a mock trial where Toadie is the victor. He and his friends win Jack Ramsay's bequest of $7000 when they design a flying machine, which makes it the furthest distance across the river. Tuong helps out at the university radio station, UNIfm. He also organises the student elections and chairs the debate between Lance Wilkinson and "Sandy Swimmer", who is revealed to be Toadie. He declares Toadie the winner. Tuong buys Madge Bishop and Lou Carpenter's business, Ozechef.
14 October 1998–22 January 1999	Deidre Kaufmann	Lidia Faranda	Deidre is Karl Kennedy's patient. Several months later, she is hospitalised and goes into cardiac arrest. Sarah Beaumont saves Deidre's life, but as she is not a qualified medical professional, her job is placed in jeopardy.
14 October 1998r–17 July 2000	Pippa Layton	Natalie Shostak	Pippa is Karl Kennedy's receptionist at his surgery.
26 October 1998–7 December 2000	Pat Horrocks	Mirren Lee	Pat is a player for the senior women's basketball team The Grey Growlers, and Madge Bishop's teammate.
3–5 November	Bianca Healey	Joy Mitchell	Bianca is Mike Healey's mother. When Mike introducers her to his new partner Libby Kennedy, Bianca makes it clear she does not like Libby and compares her to Mike's estranged wife, Victoria, who she prefers.
25 November 1998–30 March 1999	Victoria Healey	Tamar Kelly	Victoria is Mike Healey's estranged wife. Mike's new partner Libby Kennedy witnesses Victoria kiss Mike, but he explains there was nothing in it. Victoria and Libby constantly clash. Drew Kirk later catches Victoria and Mike kissing and punches Mike. Drew tells Libby, but she refuses to believe him and stays with Mike, until Mike's daughter Sasha reveals that Victoria is pregnant. Victoria admits that she and Mike have seen each other a few times since their separation and apologises to Libby before leaving.
