= Paul McClain =

- Neighbours character
- Portrayed by: Jansen Spencer
- Duration: 1997–2001, 2005
- First appearance: 4 November 1997
- Last appearance: 27 July 2005
- Introduced by: Stanley Walsh (1997); Ric Pellizerri (2005)
In-universe information
- Occupation: High school student; Waiter; AFL player
- Father: Leo McClain
- Mother: Angela McClain

Paul McClain is a fictional character from the Australian television soap opera Neighbours, played by Jansen Spencer. Paul made his first appearance during the episode broadcast on 4 November 1997. Spencer decided to leave the role in September 2001, and Paul departed on 11 December 2001. In 2005, Spencer reprised the role for a cameo appearance in the show's 20th anniversary episode.

== Casting ==
In 1997, Jansen Spencer heard about the possibility of a role on Neighbours and he originally auditioned for a small part. Spencer told Jon Peake of Inside Soap "It was a month before I heard anything, but when I did they told me I hadn't got a little part – I had got a permanent role instead!" Spencer revealed he was initially star stuck when he first started filming on set. In September 2001, Peake's colleague Jason Herbison reported that Spencer had decided to leave Neighbours after four years. He filmed his final scenes that same month. Spencer commented, "I've had a great time and I've learned a lot – I didn't know a thing wen I started." The actor later said that he was sad to leave the show, but he had remained in the role for longer than he ever expected to. Paul's exit storyline saw him leaving Erinsborough to play football for the Adelaide Crows. Spencer later reprised his role for the soap's 20th anniversary episode, which was broadcast in July 2005.

== Storylines ==
Paul was born to Leo (Ross Thompson) and Angela McClain in 1983. Leo was an alcoholic who would frequently beat Angela, and subsequently walked out when Paul was four years old. Angela raised Paul on her own until her death in 1997, which left Paul with no choice but to go into foster care.

Paul's case worker Tracey Cox (Margot Knight) brings him to Number 24 Ramsay Street to meet Harold Bishop (Ian Smith), who is working for the foster care programme via The Salvation Army. Harold, Paul and Tracey go to Calder Park Raceway after Paul mentions he likes motor racing. After Harold reveals all to his wife, Madge (Anne Charleston), he suggests they foster Paul. Madge is reluctant at first to foster, and Paul is equally reluctant to be fostered by the Bishops but everyone agrees to it. During Paul's first week with the Bishops, his enthusiasm for playing the electric guitar does not go down very well with Madge. Paul confides in Harold that he feels that bonding with Madge would be betraying his late mother, but Harold assures him that would not be the case and his mother would want him to be happy. After Paul is accused when some money goes missing from the coffee shop, he runs away but is found and Harold apologises.

Paul quickly befriends Hannah Martin (Rebecca Ritters), Harold's neighbour, but virtually ignores her when her internet friend Mike Burns (Daniel Jolles) shows interest in Paul's guitar playing and tastes in music. Hannah is hurt, but forgives Paul when he explains that he has a lot in common with Mike but doesn't know anything about her. Paul and Hannah begin hanging out together a lot but are too shy to discuss their feelings and remain friends. Hannah agrees to teach Paul how to dance for the upcoming formal.

When Tracey tells Paul his father Leo wants to get in contact with him, he refuses to speak to his father. Leo arrives in Ramsay Street and Paul is very frosty towards him and refuses to listen to Leo's story of how he's changed and beaten his alcoholism. Paul eventually softens and agrees to bond with his father, visiting him occasionally. Paul realises he likes Hannah as more than just a friend, but it comes a little too late as she leaves to stay in France with her friend Claire Girard (Adele Schober) for six months. When the local residents of Erinsborough enter a contest to win a bequest of $7,000 left by Madge's grandfather, Jack Ramsay, Paul enlists the help of local mechanic Drew Kirk (Dan Paris) to help him design a flying machine in order to fly across the river. Patrick Greenwood (Matthew Barnes) gets under Paul's skin by mocking the machine and his father and the two have a fight at the garage, which is quickly broken up by Drew. The day of the bequest arrives and Patrick's machine only manages to make it two feet; Paul and Drew's invention makes it a little further, but they ultimately lose out to university student Tuong Pham (Trent Huen).

During Hannah's absence, Paul finds himself the subject of unwanted female attention at Erinsborough High. Around this time, Tad Reeves (Jonathon Dutton) arrives from Tindara to stay with his cousin, Toadfish Rebecchi (Ryan Moloney) and he and Paul quickly make friends. When Leo returns to Erinsborough and stays with the Bishops, Paul is delighted. However, Harold is unimpressed when he finds out Leo and Paul were at the local pub, as Leo is an alcoholic. Things are tense when Leo suggests that if Angela was alive, she would not let him see Paul. Eventually things are resolved and Leo goes back to Port Lincoln and suggests Paul join him on the next holiday. Hannah returns from France and confronts Paul when she finds out he has been dating Jade Cleary (Talia Krape) while she was absent. Paul counters that Jade told him Hannah had been seeing Claire's brother Pascale, while she was in France. Paul and Hannah temporarily break up, but later reunite.

John "Teabag" Teasdale (Nathan Phillips) appears when Paul, Tad and Hannah are riding their bikes down at Harold's allotment. They befriend Teabag when he agrees to help them make a BMX video. When Paul discovers Teabag is a criminal and the culprit behind the robbery of Billy Kennedy's (Jesse Spencer) workshop, he tries to warn Hannah off him. Paul and Teabag get into a physical confrontation and things escalate when Teabag makes a nuisance of himself by harassing Madge and generally being unpleasant in the coffee shop. Paul and Tad try to gain some measure of revenge but a stone-throwing incident backfires when the police are called and the boys are arrested and cautioned. When Hannah's father, Philip (Ian Rawlings), gets a new job in Darwin, Hannah refuses to leave and Paul is equally reluctant to let his girlfriend go. He tries to persuade Harold and Madge into letting Hannah stay with them at Number 24, but the idea is shot down as Tad is already living there and there is no room for Hannah. Paul and Hannah spend Hannah's final night in Erinsborough together in her treehouse. On the morning of the Martin's departure, Paul and Hannah share a tearful farewell and agree to keep in touch.

The Scully family move into Number 26 and Paul is instantly attracted to Felicity Scully (Holly Valance), while her younger sister, Michelle (Kate Keltie) is attracted to Paul. Paul tries to get Flick's attentions, but sours relations when he tries to kiss her. After Tad explains that Paul is crazy about Flick, she forgives him and they agree to be friends. Paul supports Tad after he finds out he is adopted. When Paul knocks back Simone King's (Denise Briskin) advances and comes back from visiting Leo, to find out Tad is dating her, there is tension between the boys. Paul's talent for football is noticed by Daniel Fitzgerald (Brett Tucker), who asks him to play for Erinsborough's senior team. During this time, Paul catches the attention of Cheyenne Rivers (Angelique Meunier) and they begin dating. When Cheyenne frames Paul for a robbery at the local sports store, where Joel Samuels (Daniel MacPherson) works, he agrees to take the blame for her after she tells him her father would come down hard on her. Paul then dumps Cheyenne after he realises how selfish she is being. Cheyenne then confesses and is sent away, but returns to be Paul's partner at the Deb Ball.

Madge is diagnosed with terminal pancreatic cancer, putting a strain on the family. Paul, knowing Madge has limited time, vows to make it as enjoyable for Madge as possible. During Madge's final hours, Paul tells her she is the best mother he could ask for. Madge dies, leaving Paul, Harold and Tad devastated. Following Madge's funeral, Paul and Harold agree to go to Paris, as Madge had planned to go before she died. After returning home, Paul is shocked when Harold decides to sell up after he feels he is surrounded by too many reminders of Madge so Paul, Tad, Lou Carpenter (Tom Oliver) and the other residents host a barbecue to show Harold what he means to them.

When Paul rejoins the Dingoes football team after a failed run the previous year, he discovers teammate Nathan Tyson (Luke Hemsworth) is using steroids to bulk up. After alerting Doctor Karl Kennedy (Alan Fletcher), Nathan is dropped and Paul becomes a pariah among the team for blowing the whistle on Nathan. The coach, Pat Miller (Matt Norman), keeps Paul on the bench for the next few games but eventually relents when he is forced to play Paul due to the injury of another player. After Paul scores the winner, he confronts Pat, tells him he is a bully and walks off.

At the end of the year, Paul is unsure about taking his Year 12 exams but decides to after Lyn Scully (Janet Andrewartha) tells him that it is not the end of the world if he fails. Paul's results are reasonably good. He is later offered a chance to join the Adelaide Crows after being selected. Paul's friends and family throw him a leaving party at Lou's place where Tad gives him a photo and Flick gives him a kiss. Paul then leaves for Adelaide. Four years later, Paul appears in Annalise Hartman's (Kimberly Davies) Ramsay Street documentary.

== Reception ==
A writer for the BBC described Paul's most notable moment as "Being picked for the Adelaide Crows after so many false starts." Jackie Brygel of the Herald Sun had a positive reaction to the character, writing "What a nice boy that Paul is – a young fellow who has had more than his share of problems but who always manages to rise above them and get on with life. This week, however, Paul takes on a challenge that no adolescent should ever have to face: driving lessons with Harold!"
