= Anne Wilkinson =

Fictional Australian TV character

- Neighbours character
- Portrayed by: Brooke Satchwell
- Duration: 1996–2000
- First appearance: 19 November 1996
- Last appearance: 5 April 2000
- Introduced by: Stanley Walsh
In-universe information
- Occupation: Student at Erinsborough High; Student at Eden Hills University; Waitress
- Father: Bill Hails
- Mother: Ruth Wilkinson
- Stepfather: Philip Martin
- Brothers: Lance Wilkinson
- Half-brothers: Ben Atkins
- Husband: Billy Kennedy
- Sons: Jackson Kennedy

Anne Wilkinson (also Hails) is a fictional character from the Australian soap opera Neighbours, played by Brooke Satchwell. She made her first on screen appearance on 19 November 1996. Satchwell quit the role in 1999 and the character departed on 5 April 2000

== Casting ==
Emily Milburn originally auditioned for the role of Anne, before she was cast as Caitlin Atkins six months later. Brooke Satchwell had just completed an advertisement for Just Jeans, when a make-up artist advised her to find an agent. Twelve months later she received an audition for the role of Anne, which she won. Satchwell was fifteen when she joined the cast in 1996 and the role was her first professional job in the acting industry. Shortly after she started, Satchwell came down with glandular fever and she had to stop filming for a fortnight. During her time in the show, Satchwell lived in Mornington Peninsula and spent five hours a day commuting to and from the Neighbours set. As she was still at school, Satchwell received tutoring on weekends, but she eventually had to finish by correspondence.

Satchwell decided to leave Neighbours in 1999 and she filmed her final scenes in November of that year. Satchwell told The Sun-Herald that she never intended to stay with the show for more than three years.

== Storylines ==
Anne arrives in Ramsay Street to stay with her mother, Ruth (Ailsa Piper) and twin brother, Lance (Andrew Bibby) at Number 32 for several days. Anne reveals to Lance that she dislikes their father, Bill's (Ian Stanley Pearce) new girlfriend and after a talk, moves in with Ruth and Lance. Anne later meets Billy Kennedy and is attracted to him but is reluctant to admit it, as he is, in turn, attracted to Anne. Lance and Toadfish Rebecchi (Ryan Moloney), Billy's friend and housemate formulate a plan to get Billy and Anne together at the Street's Christmas party by buying gifts and signing Billy and Anne's respective names to them.

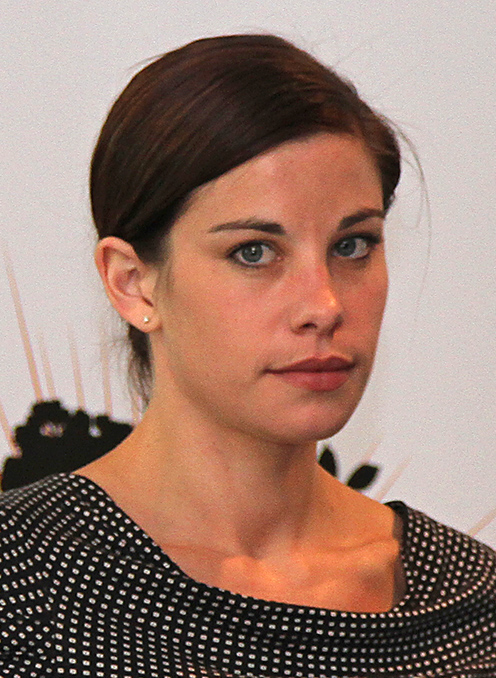
Brooke Satchwell portrayed the role for the character's full duration.

Anne and Billy begin dating but their blossoming relationship is threatened when Anne's ex-boyfriend, Justin Black (Chris Ryan) arrives on the scene and begins competing with Billy for Anne's affections. Justin ultimately leaves and Anne and Billy resume dating. When Ben Atkins (Brett Cousins) arrives is Erinsborough and moves next door to the Wilkinsons, Anne is immediately taken with him and develops a crush on him, putting strain on her relationship with Billy. To dissuade Anne's advances, Ben confesses to Anne he is her half-brother, something she initially disbelieves until Ruth confirms that she gave birth to Ben at age 15 and subsequently adopted him out. Anne is upset with the revelation and remains angry with Ruth and Ben. Anne wants to move back in with her father, but relents when she finds out he is moving away with his new girlfriend.

Anne eventually accepts Ben as her half-brother and she and Billy reconcile. When Caitlin, Ben's younger adoptive sister, arrives in Erinsborough and begins training to be a competitive swimmer along with Billy, Anne becomes jealous and resentful. In the 1997 season finale of Neighbours, Anne travels to Sydney to visit Billy after a big swim team meet, only to find him kissing Caitlin in a hotel room. Billy tries to explain his actions, but Anne will not listen to him and returns to Erinsborough. Caitlin later visits Anne and warns her that she is going to take Billy away from her.

After Ben is involved in a huge car crash during a race at Calder Park Raceway, Anne and Caitlin are forced to put aside their differences while Ben recovers in hospital. Billy asks Anne for another chance but with Caitlin in the picture, things are difficult so they split once more. When Drew Kirk (Dan Paris) and Joel Samuels (Daniel MacPherson) arrive in Erinsborough, Anne makes a play for both but is unsuccessful with the former, as Drew turns her down for being too young. Anne briefly dates Joel but it fizzles out due to the complication of Joel living at the Kennedys and Billy not being completely over her. Anne quickly befriends local pensioner, Lily Madigan (Althea McGrath) and tries to help save her house from being bulldozed by developers. When Anne makes a campaign the man responsible for the impending project, he sues for defamation of character. However, the developer is revealed to be corrupt and Lily's house is saved.

While interviewing local homeless man, Fred Parkes (Colin Duckworth), Anne goes to the kitchen and when she returns, she notices Fred has died. The incident leaves her shaken and soon after, Lily also dies, making Anne wonder whether she is cursed. Anne runs for School captain alongside one of her closest friends, Amy Greenwood (Jacinta Stapleton), who is Lance's girlfriend. After it is revealed that Lance voted twice, the girls share the captaincy.

After Ruth marries Philip Martin (Ian Rawlings), The Wilkinson move into Number 26 with him and his daughter Hannah (Rebecca Ritters). During this period, Anne becomes close to Billy again due to living right next door and him repeating Year 12 (despite having gotten into University). Anne receives news that she has inherited Lily's house. To celebrate, she and the other teens go away on a camping trip. While there, Billy and Anne have sex for the first time. The following morning when Billy tries to downplay it to Craig "Pinhead" Pinders (Nathan Godkin) as no big deal, Anne is hurt and drives off in the ute. Anne is bogged down at a river bank and is found by Joel and Billy's father Karl (Alan Fletcher). The men help with the car but it careens forward down the bank and ends up in the water, trapping Joel's knee. Anne runs to get help while Karl battles to save Joel. Luckily, a rescue crew arrive and airlift Joel to hospital.

Billy apologises to Anne and explains his comments were to shut Pinhead up. Anne later receives her VCE results and is eligible to study art at Dawber University in Queensland. Anne leaves but immediately returns after a change of heart, and decides to study locally at Eden Hills. Ruth is disappointed by this but ultimately realises it is what Anne wants. Gary O'Neil (Kevin Hopkins), Lily's nephew contests her Will and demands Anne relinquish Lily's house to him. Anne refuses and battles Gary in court and wins. David "Fanto" Hodges (Daniel Dinnen) takes an interest in Anne, much to the chagrin of Billy, who sneakily reads Anne's diary and is collared by Hannah. Later, during a confrontation about Anne's feelings for Fanto, Anne is accidentally injured when she and Billy fight over the diary. Anne then breaks up with Billy and moves into Fanto's warehouse with all his artist friends shortly after Philip, Ruth and Hannah leave Erinsborough for Darwin.

After dating Fanto a while, Anne begins to see changes in his behaviour. One night at a meal with Lance and Amy, Fanto tells Anne to disassociate herself with her respective brother and best friend. Anne refuses and when she finds out that Fanto made advances towards Amy, she promptly dumps him and moves out of the warehouse and back into her old home at Number 32 with local teacher Teresa Bell (Krista Vendy). Anne finds herself drawn back to Billy and they give their relationship yet another chance after sharing a kiss. Several weeks later, Anne finds out that Amy has been cheating on Lance with her airline colleague Damien Smith and has consequently fallen pregnant, which she keeps a secret. When Lance finds out he is upset with Anne and Amy, but eventually forgives them. Amy leaves to marry Damien.

When Billy is offered an apprenticeship by Greg Mast (Roy Thompson) in Queensland and has to leave immediately, Anne is distraught. After Billy's farewell party at Luna Park, Anne decides to get a transfer to Dawber University and visits him by train a month later. Billy is pleasantly surprised to see Anne at the station and the two vow to stay together forever. Billy and Anne have a son called Jackson and later welcome twins. They then marry.

== Reception ==
For her portrayal of Anne, Satchwell received a Logie Award for Most Popular New Talent in 1998. The following year, Satchwell was nominated for Best Actress at the Inside Soap Awards. In 2000, Satchwell won the People's Choice award for Favourite Teen Idol.

The BBC said Anne's most notable moment was "Being caught skinny-dipping with Billy." Miranda Wood of The Sun-Herald said Anne and Billy's romance "captivated audiences for the past three years. Their on-screen relationship was likened to the Scott (Jason Donovan) and Charlene (Kylie Minogue) phenomenon." In 2010, Sky criticised Anne and branded her as the "boring sweetheart" in the series. Paul Brooks from Soaplife included Anne and Billy in his list of "dream lovers". He assessed that "the emotional ups and downs of Bill and Anne are almost a soap on their own." In November 1999, an All About Soap critic praised Satchwell and Spencer's performance stating "if Jason and Kylie were the soapworld's sweethearts in the 1980s, then their crown has undoubtedly been passed onto Jesse and Brooke, alias teenage lovers Billy Kennedy and Anne Wilkinson."
