= Ruth Wilkinson =

- Neighbours character
- Portrayed by: Ailsa Piper
- Duration: 1996–1999, 2005
- First appearance: 3 October 1996
- Last appearance: 27 July 2005
- Introduced by: Stanley Walsh (1996); Ric Pellizerri (2005)
In-universe information
- Occupation: Physiotherapist
- Husband: Bill Hails (until 1996); Philip Martin (1998–present)
- Sons: Ben Atkins; Lance Wilkinson
- Daughters: Anne Wilkinson
- Stepsons: Michael Martin
- Stepdaughters: Debbie Martin; Hannah Martin
- Grandsons: Jackson Kennedy

Ruth Wilkinson is a fictional character from the Australian television soap opera Neighbours, played by Ailsa Piper. She made her first appearance during the episode broadcast on 3 October 1996. Ruth was introduced as Helen Daniels' (Anne Haddy) physiotherapist. She was a divorced single mother, who later established a relationship with Philip Martin (Ian Rawlings), which attracted some opposition from their children. The relationship was later tested by the introduction of Ruth's long lost son, Ben Atkins (Brett Cousins) and his father Geoff Burke (Andrew McKaige). Philip and Ruth marry in 1998, amid a breast cancer scare for Ruth. The Martin family were written out of Neighbours and they departed together on 20 October 1999. Piper reprised her role for the show's 20th anniversary episode, which aired on 27 July 2005.

== Casting ==
Piper was originally considered for the role of Susan Kennedy, before Jackie Woodburne was cast. Piper was an established theatre actress and writer, who had not acted in television. She was invited to join the cast as Ruth in early 1996. She explained "I was lying on a beach in Bali when the fax came through from my agent. (Actress) Tracey Mann was with me and said: 'Do it, you'll have the greatest time of your life' and she's right." Piper admitted to being surprised by the offer of a two-year contract with the show. She relinquished her position as a board member of the Playbox Theatre Company, as she knew she would be unable to attend the meetings. She initially found the fast rehearsal process to be a big challenge, stating "In rehearsing for the theatre you can muck up and there's no one to see you fail. With TV there's 60 million people around the world who will see you fail if you don't get your rehearsal shot right. But I'm having a great time and the adrenalin's pumping. I think there must be a part of me that quite likes speed."

== Development ==
=== Characterisation and relationship with Philip Martin ===
Ruth is introduced as Helen Daniels' (Anne Haddy) new physiotherapist and a love interest for Philip Martin (Ian Rawlings). She is a single mother to Lance Wilkinson (Andrew Bibby) and Anne Wilkinson (Brooke Satchwell). A reporter for the Illawarra Mercury said Piper's role allowed her to "portray the non-traditional family unit in a positive light." When asked in what ways she was similar to her character, Piper told Penny Harrison of The Sydney Morning Herald: "We share the same legs and the same quick temper."

Ruth gets on well with Helen, but not with her grandson-in-law, Philip. However, when her ex-husband, Bill Hails (Ian Stanley Pearce), turns up, Philip becomes a "useful ally." Philip becomes nervous about asking Ruth out and he is "egged on" by Helen who plays matchmaker. The Daily Record said "the makers of Neighbours can stretch out this relationship for several episodes before we have a clear idea if it's actually going anywhere." Lance later catches Ruth and Philip sharing a secret kiss and they begin a relationship. The BBC said Ruth and Philip's relationship was "no picnic" and their children took time getting used to it. Philip's youngest daughter, Hannah Martin (Rebecca Ritters), resents Ruth until they have a heart to heart talk.

Ruth and Philip also have to cope with her long lost son, Ben Atkins (Brett Cousins) and his father, Geoff Burke (Andrew McKaige), arriving in town. Piper told a reporter for the Illawarra Mercury that she would never forget the moment producers told her that she was going to have a 21-year-old son and that her character had been pregnant at 16, which she had kept hidden. Ben comes to Ramsay Street to meet Ruth, and Piper said it was "the first time we ever saw Ruth's character as anything but a bright and sunny person." Piper found that uncovering new things about her character led to "really meaty scenes." Ben's arrival won an AFI Award and Piper said the episode was "beautifully written" and she and Cousins were allowed to feed the characters and not just the plot. Ben is later involved in a major car accident and he is left in a coma, which is a testing time for Ruth.

=== Wedding and cancer scare ===
Ruth and Philip get engaged and Piper said while it was an exciting change for her character, she loved being a single parent. She later told Colin Vickery of the Herald Sun that a lot of single mothers related to her character and had told her that they enjoyed the relationship Ruth had with her children. She continued: "Because of that I was loath to give up Ruth's single status, but then I realised that there are a whole lot more women out there trying to blend families than are staying single." Piper was "spooked" about filming her first wedding, and she admitted to being "superstitious" about saying the vows. During the shoot, Piper injured her ring finger in a car door, which meant close ups of Ruth's wedding ring being placed on her finger could not be filmed due to the bruising. Piper joked "I said it was my husband getting me back for marrying another man."

Ruth and Philip marry during a period of anxiety for Ruth, who is waiting for test results to see if she has breast cancer. The storyline began with Ruth discovering a lump in her breast, leaving her fearful that she has cancer. A reporter for The Weekly News described the scenes that followed as "harrowing for Piper to film, as she often broke down in tears due to her character's "terror" at the thought she would die and never see Anne and Lance grow up. Piper felt that she had "a sense" of what was going in her character's body, and had to tell herself that it was not her going through the scare. The storyline also brought back memories of Piper's own mother's death from cancer.

As she continued filming the storyline, Piper endured her own health issues when she was informed that she had three skin cancers on her face. Piper stated: "At first I couldn't believe it. It all seemed just too extraordinary. There I was, going to work every day to try to act out Ruth's feelings of apprehension. And I was facing the same fears in real life." Piper did not want to take time off, knowing that her character's storyline would have to be interrupted at a crucial moment, so she asked her doctors to delay surgery for six weeks. Piper admitted to being "terrified" and experienced "terrible anxiety" about the skin cancer and how her face would look after surgery. Piper completed her character's storyline and underwent the operation which was a success.

On-screen, Ruth is determined to go ahead with the wedding and Piper explained: "This is her big day and she wants it to be just right. However, as she doesn't have her results, there is the thought at the back of her mind that the news might not be good. She's doing her best not to think about it." Ruth arrives at the ceremony on the back of a classic Harley Davidson motorbike and she is "thrilled" to see both Ben and Michael Martin (Troy Beckwith), who return for the wedding. Piper said that there is an atmosphere of madness, happiness and excitement to the day. Ruth later discovers that she does not have cancer.

=== Departure and cameo ===
In September 1999, Inside Soap reported that the Martin family had been written out of Neighbours and that they had already filmed their final scenes. Piper later revealed that she had originally decided to leave at the end of her two-year contract, thinking that the producers would not want her for much longer, however, she was persuaded to stay on for another year. She said the extra time had been a bonus. Piper suggested that Ruth could be killed-off after succumbing to cancer, following her previous scare, but the producers were "horrified" at the thought of killing off a character who had become popular with viewers. Piper found filming her final scenes to be very emotional. She said that the farewell scene with Satchwell and Bibby was "devastating" for her, and even rehearsing the moment had been difficult.

Due to crying, Piper struggled to get her lines out, stating "I thought I'd be fine, but literally every time, I'd just turn and look at my screen kids and I would be gone. When we came to film it for real, I was crying absolutely uncontrollably." The character's final storylines saw her "harangued" by her former husband, who asked her for money, while Lance developed a gambling addiction. After Philip has a mid-life crisis, he decides to move the family to Darwin. Ruth initially considers commuting thousands of miles, but ultimately chooses to follow her husband when she gets a top job at a Darwin hospital. Piper explained that "it's nice that Ruth's left to go somewhere rather than running away from something." In April 2005, Piper reprised her role for Neighbours' 20th anniversary episode, which aired in July 2005.

== Storylines ==
Ruth became pregnant to her boyfriend Geoff Burke when she was sixteen. She gave birth to a son, who she named Christopher. Ruth's parents advised her to place Christopher for adoption. He was later adopted by the Atkins family and renamed Ben. Ruth went on to marry Bill Hails and they had twins, Anne and Lance. Bill and Ruth later divorce and Lance chooses to live with Ruth, while Anne stays with Bill.

Ruth comes to Erinsborough to work as Helen Daniels' physiotherapist. Ruth clashes with Philip Martin and after an argument, Ruth is fired. Philip changes his mind after seeing how her departure affects Helen. Philip accompanies Ruth to retrieve her car from Bill and he offers to rent a house to her. Ruth and Philip discover Lance and Hannah are dating and it causes friction between them. The tension between Ruth and Philip comes to a head on Christmas Day when they kiss. Ruth and Philip become a couple despite opposition from their children. When Ben arrives in Ramsay Street, and moves in next door to Ruth, she becomes worried about the amount of time he is spending with Lance and Anne, who had since moved to Ramsay Street. Ben confesses to Ruth that he is the son she gave up and after an emotional conversation, Ruth builds up a relationship with Ben.

Ruth and Philip break up and Ruth decides to leave Erinsborough. Anne and Lance try to convince her to stay and Ruth relents. She takes a job at Karl Kennedy's (Alan Fletcher) surgery and has a short-lived relationship with Alistair O'Connor (Michael O'Neill). Helen dies and Ruth and Philip become close again. Philip suggests that Ruth, Lance and Anne move in with him and Hannah, but she is not keen on living together out of wedlock. During Ben's race at Calder Park Raceway, Philip proposes to Ruth, but before she can accept, Ben has a car crash. He is rushed to hospital and is left in a coma but later recovers. Ben's father, Geoff, arrives, which shocks Ruth and she warns him that his presence could set Ben's recovery back. Ben decides to move away with Geoff, which devastates Ruth.

Ruth accepts Philip's proposal, but before the wedding, she finds a lump in her breast. She and Philip bring the wedding forward and Ben and Philip's son, Michael, return. On the day of the wedding, Ruth is brought to Lassiter's Lake on the back of a motorcycle. At the reception, Ruth receives a phone call telling her that she is in remission. Ruth, Lance and Anne then move in with Philip and Hannah. Ruth and Hannah clash constantly, but after talking things through, they start to get on better. Ruth starts exhibiting strange behaviour and when Hannah spots her hugging Bill, she thinks they having an affair. Ruth reveals that Bill has been left bankrupt by his new wife and she has been lending him money. Lance develops a gambling addiction and sells Ruth's fob watch. Ruth supports her son when he agrees to attend Gamblers Anonymous.

Philip gets a job in Darwin, but Ruth is reluctant to leave. They eventually decide on moving to Darwin, but have a hard time convincing Hannah to go with them. Hannah eventually agrees to go and the Martins say goodbye to their friends. Six years later, Ruth appears in Annalise Hartman's (Kimberly Davies) documentary about Ramsay Street.

== Reception ==
Marion McMullen of the Coventry Telegraph said Piper had some "meaty" storylines during her three years on Neighbours. She also said Ruth had "certainly been through the mill" with "a messy divorce, a cancer scare, a resentful rebellious daughter and the reappearance of a long-lost son that she'd placed for adoption when he was just a baby." McMullen added that Ruth was a "super-mum." The BBC said Ruth's most notable moment was "Sharing a secret Christmas kiss with Philip." Tina Baker said Ruth was a "much loved" character. In 1999, viewers voted Ruth the third "Best female over 30" in the Neighbours.com Awards. Brian Courtis and Andrew Ryan of The Age said there would be "some sad faces around the box" when Ruth, Philip and Hannah departed.
