= Caitlin Atkins =

- Neighbours character
- Portrayed by: Emily Milburn
- Duration: 1997–1998
- First appearance: 29 September 1997
- Last appearance: 24 June 1998
- Introduced by: Stanley Walsh
In-universe information
- Occupation: Student; Swimmer
- Brothers: Nicholas Atkins; Ben Atkins (adoptive)

Caitlin Atkins is a fictional character from the Australian soap opera Neighbours, played by Emily Milburn. The actress originally auditioned for the role of Anne Wilkinson and received the part of Caitlin six months later. She made her first appearance during the episode broadcast on 29 September 1997. Caitlin is introduced as the younger sister of series regular Ben Atkins (Brett Cousins). She is portrayed as being strong willed and manipulative, yet vulnerable. Milburn said Caitlin was very different from her, but she enjoyed cutting loose for the role. Caitlin is a talented swimmer and she falls for her training partner, Billy Kennedy (Jesse Spencer), whom she pursues despite knowing he is in a relationship. Producers decided to write the character out of the show in April 1998. Caitlin departed alongside her older brother, Nicholas Atkins (Jason Crewes) on 24 June 1998.

== Casting ==
Milburn originally auditioned for the role of Anne Wilkinson, but it was Brooke Satchwell who was eventually cast. Of her audition, Milburn said "It was the worst audition I'd ever done. Afterwards I bawled my eyes out. I thought I'd never work for Neighbours, but six months later I got the part of Caitlin." Milburn enjoyed being part of the cast, which felt like a family to her. Milburn later explained how she had never really considered a career as an actor despite being interested in the industry. After deciding to get an agent, she thought she would attend a few auditions and she secured a role in The Genie from Down Under. Milburn said that her "whole year turned upside down" when she won the role of Caitlin. She had to drop four of her VCE subjects in order to film on the show. In February 1998, Colin Vickery of the Herald Sun reported that Milburn had signed on for another stint with the show. Milburn initially signed on to play Caitlin for 13 weeks, as producers tested out the character, and the audience reaction was positive. Milburn told Vickery: "I never dreamed I'd get an offer like this so soon in my acting career. I thought something like this would only happen a long time in the future." She hoped that after Neighbours, she would finish school, travel, study drama, and then try for work in the theatre and film.

== Development ==
Caitlin is introduced as the younger sister of Ben Atkins (Brett Cousins). She comes to stay with him while their parents are overseas for work. Caitlin decides to "fire up the neighbourhood", as she feels lost and rejected by her parents. Describing the character's personality, a writer for the Illawarra Mercury said "Caitlin Atkins manages to stir up trouble in Ramsay Street, hiding her inner feelings under an air of tough bravado." Milburn found that Caitlin was very different from her and she called Caitlin her "worst nightmare." She said: "I had to think about my worst nightmare and play it like that because I'm usually pretty calm. I hold back a little bit and I don't think like Caitlin does, but it was fun to cut loose and just go for it." Milburn told Annette Dasey of Inside Soap that Caitlin is a "crazy woman" at first as she wants to be noticed and popular. Although she is strong willed, Caitlin has a vulnerable side too. Playing the character's "bitchy" side worried Milburn, and she initially struggled to accept "the love/hate response" Caitlin received from the audience. Caitlin is a talented swimmer. A writer for the BBC said she "displayed an intense dedication to her training regime." Milburn was also an accomplished swimmer and said she and Caitlin shared the same strength and determination.

Caitlin prioritises finding a boyfriend over swimming and she sets her sights on her training partner, Billy Kennedy (Jesse Spencer). Milburn explained that Caitlin falls for Billy immediately and she does not care that he is dating Anne Wilkinson. Caitlin wants him and prepares to go all out to get him. Billy and Anne were a popular couple with the serial's viewers at the time. Caitlin's profile on the BBC states that she becomes "quite a determined young woman" and uses her "feminine wiles" to try to date Billy. After flirting "non-stop" with him, the pair share "a passionate kissing session that Anne witnesses." Milburn told Vickery (Herald Sun) that she would never copy her character's actions as she would "hate it" if it were to happen to her. She also believed that the absence of Caitlin's parents led her to want to be wanted by someone. She said "I think the whole thing with Billy is 'I need to be loved' rather than 'I'm in love and I love him'. She could potentially break the couple up because of her own insecurity rather than any real love she has for Billy." Milburn told Vickery that she knew Caitlin was supposed to be "strong-willed", but she was surprised that she became "as devious" as she did. Caitlin continues to pursue Billy, which causes Anne "heartache". She later dates fellow swimmer, Josh Hughes (Sullivan Stapleton).

In April 1998, Inside Soap's Jason Herbison reported that Milburn's character had been written out of the show. Herbison commented that Caitlin had seemingly run her course, but the news came as a surprise to Milburn. She stated "It wasn't my decision to leave. It was just something they decided regarding my character." Caitlin and her older brother, Nicholas Atkins (Jason Crewes) leave Ramsay Street together and return to Adelaide. The siblings make sure the residents do not forget them in a hurry by painting a goodbye message on the road. Of her character's exit, Milburn said "I was sad to go. But it's a good chance to do other things. I'm looking forward to travelling and studying, as well as playing different characters."

== Storylines ==
When her parents decided to move away temporarily to the Middle East for her father's work, Caitlin decided she wanted to stay in Australia. With one brother, Nicholas, travelling the world tutoring the children of wealthy families, Caitlin was shipped off to stay with her other brother, Ben. Caitlin's main passion in life was swimming, at which she competed at professional levels. Upon arriving in Erinsborough, Caitlin immediately heads down to the local pool to check out the facilities. She soon meets Billy Kennedy who works as a pool attendant and she soon decides that he would be hers. When Caitlin learns that Billy is already in a relationship with Anne Wilkinson, Ben's biological half-sister, she is disappointed, but this is not enough to put her off.

Caitlin manages to make friends with Mandi Rodgers (Sabina Lokic) from the swim team, but fails to impress her neighbours and housemates on Ramsay Street with her behaviour. Sarah Beaumont (Nicola Charles) is particularly unhappy about having to share with a teenager. Caitlin begins to feel increasingly isolated on the street, and her friendship with Billy strengthens, especially when Caitlin learns that he is a very competent swimmer and he joins the local team. The more time Caitlin and Billy spend together training causes Anne to feel paranoid. When the team heads off to Sydney to compete, and Billy and Anne have been going through an especially rocky patch, Caitlin seizes her opportunity to make a move on Billy. She kisses him, unaware that Anne had followed Billy to Sydney in order to resolve the problems in their relationship. Anne sees them kissing in Billy's hotel room, which causes further damage to their already fragile union.

Upon their return to Erinsborough, things are frosty and are not helped when Ben falls into a coma following a racing accident at Calder Park Raceway. Caitlin and Anne briefly put their differences aside out of concern for their shared brother. After Ben makes progress, Anne and Caitlin resume the grudge and Billy is forced to choose between them. Billy chooses Anne. However, Anne and Caitlin remain friends and play a trick on bully Jacinta Myers (Caroline Morgan) during the Erinsborough High Swim Carnival by switching places, which fools Jacinta into thinking she is initially racing weaker swimmer Anne, when in fact she is up against Caitlin who bests her in the event.

Josh Hughes arrives in Erinsborough to train with the swim team. Despite him being a few years older, Caitlin quickly falls for him. One day, The couple decide to skip swimming class and spend the day together, but while play fighting, Josh falls and sprains his arm. However, it soon emerges that he is exaggerating his injury in order to escape from training and spend more time with Caitlin. As the couple find themselves in trouble from all angles – including from Caitlin's brother Nicholas, who has come to look after her during Ben's convalescence- they decide to run away. However, the couple do not get very far and upon their eventual return, Josh has to go home and Caitlin realises things have failed to work out for her once again.

Caitlin constantly clashes with Nick as he is not only her guardian but her teacher at school now and finds things a lot tougher than when Ben was in charge. Meanwhile, things between Billy and Anne stall as he is unable to cope with her jealousy. Billy starts spending more time with Caitlin and attempts to start a romance with her, but Caitlin is unimpressed after all that had happened in the past. Caitlin's problems worsen when she pushes herself too far during swimming while training to win a place at the AIS and ends up collapsing in the pool at home. Caitlin is rushed to hospital and diagnosed by Dr. Veronica Olenski (Caroline Lloyd) with exhaustion. After several days rest, Caitlin figures that there is no point in making herself ill for her passion.

Caitlin notices how much Anne's twin brother, Lance (Andrew Bibby) is missing Amy Greenwood (Jacinta Stapleton) as his girlfriend, she hatches a plan to help Lance win her back. Caitlin and Lance begin pretending to see each other, making Amy extremely jealous. Amy confronts Caitlin in the toilets at Little Tommy Tucker's and warns her off, leaving Caitlin happy that her plan has worked. When Nick receives news that their mother had decided to return to Australia and wants him and Caitlin to return home to Adelaide, Caitlin refuses to believe him, but reluctantly agrees to leave with him but before her departure she paints "Never Forget Cait + Nick!" on the road as something for her friends to remember her by.

== Reception ==
The Herald Sun's Colin Vickery stated that "Caitlin has quickly become the character you love to hate on the Channel Ten soapie." A columnist for Inside Soap branded Caitlin "a minx" and said she would spice Ramsay Street up. Steven Murphy of the same publication later stated that Caitlin had made "a big impact in Erinsborough". Annette Dasey stated "Wilful and manipulative, Ben Atkins' younger sister Caitlin is trouble with a capital T." While a reporter for the Illawarra Mercury said Caitlin was "nothing short of a nightmare." When Caitlin began pursuing Billy, Michelle Hamer of The Sydney Morning Herald branded the character a "scheming teen temptress." The character's profile on the BBC stated that her most notable moment was "Kissing Billy."
