= Joel Samuels =

Fictional character from the Australian soap opera Neighbours

- Neighbours character
- Portrayed by: Daniel MacPherson
- Duration: 1998–2002, 2022
- First appearance: 13 May 1998
- Last appearance: 28 July 2022
- Introduced by: Stanley Walsh (1998); Jason Herbison (2022)
In-universe information
- Occupation: Triathlete; Marine Biology student; Sports shop assistant
- Father: Bernie Samuels
- Mother: Brenda Samuels
- Children: 2

Joel Samuels is a fictional character from the Australian television soap opera Neighbours, played by Daniel MacPherson. MacPherson secured the role after auditioning for casting director Jan Russ, who suggested that the script producers write the part of Joel for him. He relocated to Melbourne for filming, and made his first appearance during the episode broadcast on 13 May 1998. Joel was introduced as a friend of Malcolm Kennedy (Benjamin McNair) and comes to Erinsborough to stay with his family. MacPherson decided to leave Neighbours after four years and his exit scenes aired on 29 January 2002, as Joel leaves to work with a marine explorer. MacPherson reprised the role for the show final episodes, which aired in July 2022.

== Creation and casting ==
Neighbours casting director Jan Russ auditioned MacPherson; she approached the script producers and suggested they write the role of Joel for him. MacPherson joined the cast in February 1998, when he was seventeen, and he moved from Sydney to Melbourne for filming. He later recalled: "I'm not ashamed to say I bawled my eyes out that night going, 'What the hell am I doing? I've never acted, I've never lived out of home, I've never been to Melbourne, I've never been on a TV set. What the hell am I thinking?'"

== Development ==
=== Characterisation ===
Whilst travelling, Joel meets and becomes friends with Malcolm Kennedy (Benjamin McNair) and he comes to Ramsay Street "out of the blue" to stay with Malcolm's family. Upon his arrival, Joel was described as being "good-looking, down-to-earth, friendly and a champion triathlete." Annette Dasey of Inside Soap called Joel a "heart-throb" and said that he appears to be Mr Perfect. However, MacPherson told her that Joel is unlucky in love, saying "A couple of the girls throw themselves at him, but he's so naïve he doesn't really notice." The BBC said "Being a fit, young tri-athlete, Joel certainly set a few hearts a flutter among the Ramsay St girls."

=== Accident ===
When Anne Wilkinson (Brooke Satchwell) crashes her car into a riverbank, Joel and Karl Kennedy (Alan Fletcher) are first on the scene and try to help her. The car slides down the riverbank and Joel becomes trapped underneath the vehicle. A storm causes the water level to rise rapidly and Karl tries to help Joel breathe. Filming for the stunt took three days and McPherson spent most of his time underwater. He said "Luckily, that meant I didn't have too many lines to learn, half the time I had to just sit under the water, hold my breath and wonder if they were still shooting!" Joel is eventually rescued and taken to hospital and McPherson told Inside Soap that there is a chance that Joel may not be able to walk again due to his injuries. The actor said "That is a tremendous shock. The triathlon is his life." Joel tries to keep his injury from his sponsors, but Karl reveals to them that Joel may not walk again. Joel is "absolutely furious" with Karl and McPherson said "I think in his heart of hearts, Joel knew they would find out eventually, but he hasn't learnt how to deal with the consequences yet." Joel then faces a long recovery process, but he has a "good chance of pulling through."

=== Relationships ===
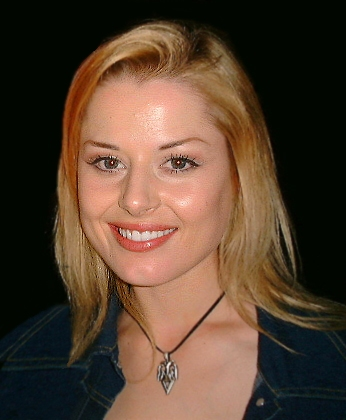
Joel dates Dee Bliss, played by Madeleine West (pictured), and ends up in a love triangle with her and her best friend.

Joel has a brief relationship with Natalie Rigby (Nicki Paull), a woman ten years his senior. Joel meets Natalie after auditioning to be a stripper and she asks him for a date. Natalie reveals that she has a teenage son, but refuses to introduce Joel to him until she is sure their relationship is serious. Joel and Natalie argue and Soaplife said Joel feels "belittled" by Natalie's over-protective attitude towards her son. The magazine added "Emotional baggage and not the age gap ruined the relationship in the end, as Natalie put her son first."

Joel begins a relationship with Dee Bliss (Madeleine West), which progresses steadily. Joel later finds himself "immediately drawn" to Dee's best friend, Carrie Clark (Vanessa Rossini), after Dee introduces him to her. MacPherson explained, "It's quite a complicated situation. He is over the moon about Dione, but I think it's a little more lust than love." Joel tries to keep his feelings about Carrie to himself, but Soaplife said this is not easy as his eyes "practically pop out of his head every time Carrie's name is mentioned." MacPherson said that Joel does not want to hurt Dee, but inevitably when feelings for someone become strong the truth comes out. West revealed that Dee feels awful after realising that Joel likes another woman, but the situation becomes worse for her as she becomes aware that it is Carrie Joel likes. Of Joel's love triangle storyline, Soaplife said "After playing the singles game for such a long time, you would think he'd want to focus all his energies on one girl. But it seems one lovely lass is not enough for him!" Joel is delighted when his father, Bernie (Sean Scully), arrives in town, but he is unaware that Bernie has been flirting with Dee. Of the interesting storyline, MacPherson said "Joel has Bernie up on a pedestal, but it turns out he's the last one to find out what he's really like. Everyone else can see that he has his faults, but nothing they can say or do make Joel realise it. He just thinks his old man is the best." Joel is "quite cut up" when he realises that his father is not the hero he perceives him to be. McPherson said the storyline was good for his character as everyone got to learn more about his background.

After their relationship ends, Dee is keen to remain friends with Joel, while Joel finds it awkward and wants them to get back together. Joel eventually moves on with his friend and neighbour Felicity Scully (Holly Valance). The official website said that they are "two of the sexiest residents in Ramsay Street" and that it was not surprising they would be getting together. The website said that up until now there has not been any attraction between Joel and Felicity. McPherson said Joel had always been aware of Felicity, but because he was dating Dee he just did not think about her. After Lance Wilkinson (Andrew Bibby) asks Joel and Felicity to star in his film, they have to kiss in a scene and McPherson said "they do a little more acting than is strictly necessary!" The actor said Joel backs off straight away and pretends it did not happen because Felicity is in high school and is "probably a little too young for him." However, Lance and Toadfish Rebecchi (Ryan Moloney) tease Joel about the kiss and Felicity's crush, so he cannot get away from it. Felicity invites Joel to the Erinsborough High debutante ball as her partner and McPherson explained that she is not exactly truthful, saying "Flick asks Joel to be her partner, and says it's because she can't find anyone else to go with. But she's actually already asked Paul, and as you can imagine, it leads to a bit of strife!"

=== Departure ===
After four years of playing Joel, MacPherson decided to leave Neighbours. He told Inside Soap's Jason Herbison: "I've learned a lot, worked with some amazing people, and got to travel. It really was the best possible way for me to break into the industry, and even though it's time for me to move on, I'll always be grateful for it." MacPherson admitted that his final week on set was sad, especially when he filmed his last scenes at Number 30. He also called his final day "weird" because he only had to film one scene early in the morning. MacPherson relocated to the United Kingdom to appear in a pantomime, followed by an appearance in a production of Godspell. MacPherson's last scenes aired in January 2002. The following year, MacPherson admitted that he occasionally watched the serial "just to see what everyone's doing." He also said that he would like to go back for a few days or weeks to see everyone.

On-screen, Joel reunites with Dee and is offered the chance to travel the world, after securing a job working with marine explorer Vernon Wells (Vincent Gil). Dee later agrees to accompany Joel on his trip, after he convinces her that it is a good opportunity. MacPherson explained "They've come though a lot together, and recently Dee confided in Joel about her miscarriage. So they've reached a new level in their relationship, and Joel thinks that going away together will be a fresh start." However, their plans are thrown into doubt when Joel loses his temper with Dee's former boyfriend Darcy Tyler (Mark Raffety), who makes it clear that he thinks Dee going away with Joel is a mistake. Joel then accidentally reveals that Dee had a miscarriage and that the baby was Darcy's. MacPherson told Herbison that Dee sees what Joel has done as a "betrayal" and as he struggles to defend himself, it is too late for their relationship. He continued, "Dee can't see that they have much of a future together if she can't trust him. Of course, this means she won't be going away with him anymore." The Ramsay Street residents throw a farewell party for the pair, unaware that Dee has changed her mind and she does not say anything. MacPherson commented that it was "a weird send-off". Joel tells Dee that she knows what time the boat is leaving if she changes her mind, and he goes to the wharf to meet Vernon. Shortly before he is due to depart, Dee turns up to say goodbye. Joel then leaves Erinsborough alone.

=== Return ===
In May 2022, it was announced MacPherson would be reprising his role for the show's final episodes. Of his return, the actor stated "Joining Neighbours at age 17, little did I know, was going to kick start a career that continues to be the adventure of a lifetime. To go back and play Joel one more time, was a small way to show my enormous gratitude to cast, crew and fans of the show."

== Storylines ==
Joel meets Malcolm Kennedy in London and the two quickly become friends. Malcolm tells Joel that he will always be welcome in Erinsborough, where his parents live. Not long after, Joel turns up at the Kennedy's house in Ramsay Street and introduces himself to Malcolm's mother Susan and younger brother, Billy (Jesse Spencer). Karl, Malcolm's father has reservations about Joel staying as the Kennedys hardly know him but relents. Joel later settles in and makes friends and catches the eye of Hannah Martin (Rebecca Ritters), who has a crush on him and goes through the effort of buying a takeaway meal and passing it off as her own in order to impress him. Hannah is crushed when Joel tells her he only likes her as a friend. Joel later gets a job at Across the Line, a local sports store and later falls for Libby (Kym Valentine), Malcolm's sister. Joel is too scared to tell her his feelings but she eventually figures it out and the pair remain friends. After a number of problems at the Kennedys', including the breakdown of Karl and Susan's marriage, Joel moves in next door to Number 30 with Sarah Beaumont (Nicola Charles) and Toadfish Rebecchi. Toadie later introduces Joel to his co-host, Sally Upton (Sally Davis) at Uni FM, the radio station at Eden Hills University. Joel and Sally begin dating but things fall apart after Sally becomes jealous of Joel's closeness with Libby and accuses him of cheating.

When Joel decides to join the Ramsay Street teenagers at a campsite to celebrate the end of Year 12 and exams, Karl offers him a lift. When they drive by a river bank, they find Anne Wilkinson sitting in a bogged down ute by the riverbank crying. Joel and Karl stop to help and begin to push the vehicle from the front, but the vehicle slips down the bank and traps Joel's knee. As the water level rises due to drains bursting and a heavy downpour of rain, Karl battles to keep Joel breathing during the rise. Joel loses consciousness and Anne raises the alarm. After being airlifted to Erinsborough Hospital, Joel wakes up and Sally visits him. Joel thinks she wants to get back together, but she tells him of her attraction to his friend, Drew Kirk (Dan Paris). Sally leaves and Joel finds it hard to be positive. Joel's mother, Brenda Samuels (Pixie Jones) visits but she has a hard time getting close to her son as he has made so many friends in the community.

Joel is later discharged from hospital and moves back in with the Kennedys temporarily, as Toadie and Sarah are finding his mood swings difficult to live with. When Joel recovers, he takes part in a routine based on the movie The Full Monty along with Bill, Karl, Drew and Toadie. Joel later meets Natalie Rigby, the manager of a pub when he auditions as a solo stripper and they begin dating, but are opposed by Natalie's son, Liam (Damien Bodie) and the relationships fizzle out. After a while of being single, Joel and Toadie decide to go out one evening to Foxy's in February 2000, a local nightclub and meet Dione Bliss and her friend, Vanessa Bradshaw (Julieanne Tait) on under the pretence of Joel being an Argentine Footballer and Toadie being a lawyer (a partial truth as Toadie is studying law). The girls ultimately see through this but play along and during one date leave the boys stranded at Italian restaurant, Lanzini's when the time comes to pay the bill. Dione later reappears and Joel falls for her but cheats on her with her friend, Carrie Clark. Joel is dumped and goes out of his way to win Dione back. They get back together but their reunion is fraught with jealousy problems and things are not made easier when Joel's father, Bernie arrives and tries to make advances towards Dione every chance he gets. Dione tells Joel who disbelieves her at first but then he comes to realize Dione is telling the truth about Bernie and soon sends his father packing. Joel and Dione begin playing jokes on each other, but Joel ultimately takes it too far when he enlists Malcolm's help by pretending to be a distant relative of Joel's interested in Dione's art. This proves too much and Joel and Dione split once again.

After helping Lance Wilkinson film a home-made Sci-Fi movie, where he and Felicity Scully are the leads who share a kiss, Joel agrees to be Flick's date to Erinsborough High's debutante ball. As the ball nears, Joel finds himself falling for Flick. At the after party Joel and Flick spend all night talking and they share a kiss the next morning by the pool. Joel and Flick try to keep their relationship a secret but gradually their neighbours and friends find out. Flick's father, Joe (Shane Connor) catches the couple together one evening and angrily confronts Joel and pushes him, injuring his shoulder. Flick refuses to return home after this and stays with Joel. When Flick opts to move out after Joe comes down hard on her, she suggests that she moves in with Joel. Joel realises things are moving too seriously and decides to join the Kennedys on a trip to London to attend Malcolm's wedding to Sarah's sister, Catherine O'Brien (Radha Mitchell).

When Joel returns, problems still have not eased and things don't get any easier when Flick moves in temporarily much to the annoyance of Toadie and Dee. After an argument with Flick on her 18th birthday about spending so much time with Dee, Joel breaks up with her and is chastized by Dee and Joe for doing so on Flick's birthday of all days. Flick later begs Joel to take her back but he tells her they are not right for each other. Joel and Dee become close again and begin dating. This is nearly wrecked when Joel accidentally tells Dee's former boyfriend, Darcy Tyler that she miscarried his baby. Dee is furious but forgives Joel. Joel begins diving with marine biologist Vernon Wells, who soon offers him a job in Queensland. Dee agrees to go with him but on the day Joel leaves, she changes her mind and they share one final kiss at the docks and Joel walks away and sets off on his journey.

Twenty years later, Toadie finds a present on his dining table that contains an empty pizza box and some dead flower clippings, and he immediately calls out for Joel to make himself present. Joel runs into the room and hugs Toadie, then meets Toadie's fiancée, Melanie Pearson (Lucinda Cowden). Joel gives Toadie and Melanie an update on his life and explains that he is working and has two children, but is divorced. Joel also apologises to them for not being able to make it to their wedding. Having learned about their old friend Amy Greenwood's (Jacinta Stapleton) declaration of love to Toadie, Joel tracks her down in Cairns and helps her realise that she is mistaken, prompting her to return for Toadie's wedding. Despite having believed himself unable to attend the wedding, Joel briefly appears at the reception on Ramsay Street.

== Reception ==
Upon Joel's arrival, Robin Oliver of The Sydney Morning Herald said "We sent them Jason and Kylie and now the Poms have sent us Daniel Macpherson, who plays newcomer Joel Samuels and has survived the first week of coaching at the pool. Just what Erinsborough needs, a Pom to teach Aussies how to swim. But no doubt it'll give the UK ratings a lift. Joel was told by best pal Mal Kennedy to stay at his parents' place, but Mal forgot to tell anybody, so the week has been spent clearing that up. Stretch things thin, don't they?"

In 1999, MacPherson received a Logie Award for "Most Popular Male Talent" for his portrayal of Joel. In 2001, MacPherson was nominated for "Most Popular Actor".

The BBC said Joel's most notable moment was "Almost dying while being pinned under a ute in a river." Viewers voted Joel's rescue from beneath the car in the river the "Best storyline of 1999" in the Neighbours.com Awards. Inside Soap called the storyline one of the show's "most dramatic moments."

In 2010, Joel was included in a TV Week poll to find the Top twenty-five Neighbours characters. The character was popular in terms of his appearance. Nick Levine of media and entertainment website Digital Spy included MacPherson in a picture feature on male soap stars. Holy Soap called Joel a "beefcake." Lorna Cooper of MSN also commented on Joel's "Hunky" appearance, saying "In effect, he was Neighbours' major piece of totty. Joel's sporty prowess was put to good use on the show; I've lost count of the number of times his toned physique was on display." In 2015, a Herald Sun reporter included Joel being "trapped by a rising river and rescued just in time" in their "Neighbours' 30 most memorable moments" feature.
