= Lance Wilkinson =

- Neighbours character
- Portrayed by: Andrew Bibby
- Duration: 1995–2001, 2005, 2018, 2022–2023
- First appearance: 9 August 1995
- Last appearance: 13 November 2023
- Introduced by: Bill Searle (1995); Stanley Walsh (1996); Ric Pellizerri (2005); Jason Herbison (2018)
In-universe information
- Other names: Lance Hails
- Occupation: Student; Landscape gardener Sci-fi convention organiser
- Father: Bill Hails
- Mother: Ruth Wilkinson
- Stepfather: Philip Martin
- Sisters: Anne Wilkinson
- Half-brothers: Ben Atkins
- Sons: Kai
- Nephews: Jackson Kennedy

Lance Wilkinson (also Hails) is a fictional character from the Australian soap opera Neighbours, played by Andrew Bibby. He made his first on-screen appearance on 9 August 1995. Bibby was cast in the recurring role of Lance after an audition. After a year, Bibby auditioned for another character called Jon and the writers chose to turn him into Lance. Lance was a bookish, paranoid boy, with a kind heart and keen wit. Lance departed on 29 March 2001, but Bibby reprised his role in July 2005 for the show's 20th anniversary, in 2018 and also for the final episode in 2022. Bibby reprised his role in a flashback sequence the following year.

== Casting ==
Neighbours was Bibby's first major long-term role. He went for a general audition, where there were five parts available. Bibby was given the role of Lance, a three-month occasional role. A year later, Bibby auditioned for another character called Jon, who the writers decided to turn into Lance. During the audition, Bibby had to share a scene with various girls to see how they looked together as twins. Brooke Satchwell, an actress Bibby had met before, came in and was given the role of Lance's sister, Anne Wilkinson. Bibby's first day of filming was on location outside the coffee shop set, a day later the actor had to perform a kissing scene with his co-star Rebecca Ritters (Hannah Martin), which he said was "a bit embarrassing!" Bibby was fifteen years old and still in school when he joined the cast. He eventually completed his VCE without taking a break from the serial. Of joining Neighbours, the actor stated "I was excited and a bit nervous when I started. At the time it was just another job for me and I didn't really know how long it would last."

== Development ==
=== Characterisation ===
Lance became the man of the family after his parents, Ruth (Ailsa Piper) and Bill (Ian Stanley Pearce), separated. Lance is initially portrayed as a "bookish" character, who is also nervous and paranoid. A writer for the BBC said Lance is kind-hearted and has a keen wit. When he was asked how Lance has changed in the three and half years he had been on the show, Bibby said "He's changed a lot, and needless to say, has grown up a great deal. I suppose the biggest change for him was when his family left - his mum Ruth, and the inlaws, Phil and Hannah. That's when he had to move out of the nest and really grow up." Bibby went on to explain that after Anne left, Lance was "on his own" and that moving in with Toadfish Rebecchi (Ryan Moloney) and Joel Samuels (Daniel MacPherson) gave him the chance to "let loose" and have some fun.

Bibby enjoyed working with Moloney and McPherson as it gave his character something different to do, other than getting involved in romantic entanglements. Of Lance's friendship with Toadie and Joel, Bibby said "Together, we have this dynamic and kind of compliment [sic] each other, I guess you could say. We bounce off each other and we know how each other works, yet we are constantly thrown into situations that we have to try and get ourselves out of. That's where the humour comes from." Bibby opined that viewers liked Lance the way he is and he agreed with them, saying "I just want to see him stay the way as he was when I was cast. I want him to be individual, and not get too hooked up with the other characters or their character traits." Bibby revealed that he had become more distant from Lance, rather than like him. The actor added that he had matured, which the writers picked up on for Lance.

=== Gambling ===
After Lance placed some bets while watching the horse racing, he soon became hooked on gambling. The problem worsened when Lance became involved with an illegal bookie, who later gave him a fright when he came to collect his money. Lance learned to conceal his addiction and Bibby explained "He only realises he has a problem when Amy ends their relationship. She finds out he's been lying to her and has lost much money. What started out as a bit of fun has become very dangerous." Lance's gambling problem continued to get out of hand and after using up his money to bet on the horses, he eventually decided to steal from his mother to make another bet. Bibby commented that Lance could not stop himself. Lance decided to make one last bet to wipe out his debts and he took his mother's fob watch. Lance then faked a break in. Bibby said "He feels really guilty about what's he's done, but convinces himself that this will be his one last bet." Lance won the bet and his friend, Chris Burgess (Nathan Bocskay), delivered his money to him during Anne's birthday party. Anne witnessed the exchange and threatened to tell Ruth and Philip Martin (Ian Rawlings). Bibby told an Inside Soap writer that Anne's threat is what makes Lance finally begin to realise that his gambling has got out of control.

=== Relationships ===
Writers created an on-screen partnership between Lance and Amy. They eventually break-up and writers paired Lance with Megan Townsend (Allison Byrne). Despite his new romance, Amy continued to play a central role to his story. Amy begins interfering in their relationship because she wants to protect Lance from Megan. Bibby told Belinda Young (TV Week) that Amy dislikes Megan and decides to follow them. Bibby stated that "Lance's love life is interesting" because he has two blonde females fighting over him. Lance becomes concerned about Amy's reluctance to accept Megan and accuses her of being a stalker. Bibby explained that there is "a series of coincidences where Amy happens to be in the same place Lance is, so Lance jumps to the conclusion that she must be stalking him." Writers initially depicted Lance in enjoyment over Amy's jealously but this changes when Amy sabotages Lance and Megan's romantic evening. He later realises that Megan is just "stringing him along" and they break-up. Despite his newfound single status, the pair continue to play a "jealous mind game". Bibby stated that "Lance has to eat his words and what's worse is that Amy rubs it in." Bibby was hopeful that Lance and Amy would reunite because their mutual attraction always remained.

=== Departure ===
In November 2000, Jackie Brygel of the Herald Sun reported that Bibby had quit Neighbours and had already filmed his last scenes. Bibby told Brygel that he rejected a new two-year contract as he decided that it was time to move on. He said "You don't know what other doors are going to open until you close one door. So I've made myself available and now we'll see what happens." Bibby said he intended to audition for drama schools in Sydney and Perth. The actor was emotional during his last day on set, telling Brygel that the cast had helped him grow up and were like a family to him. Bibby's final scenes were not scheduled to be broadcast until 2001, but he told Brygel that Lance's exit would not be dramatic. He explained: "I don't die or lose any limbs either, so that's good. I'm glad because I do feel quite attached to old Lance by now."

=== Returns ===
In April 2005, it was announced that Bibby had reprised his role for Neighbours' 20th anniversary. His return aired in July of that year.

On 17 January 2018, it was announced that Bibby had reprised the role again, along with several other returning cast members, for a feature-length special episode, which first aired on 12 February 2018. The episode centres on a belated 21st birthday party for Toadie.

== Storylines ==
Hannah Martin develops a crush on Lance, a student in Year 9. Lance eventually asks Hannah out and they begin dating. Lance takes his mother's jewellery and gives it to Hannah to impress her. When Lance's father Bill reveals the truth about the jewellery, Hannah is furious, but forgives Lance. After boasting to his friends that he had had sex with Hannah, Lance is dumped. Lance changes schools and moves to the other side of Erinsborough. Lance returns the following year and he and Hannah become friends again. Lance's mother Ruth and Philip Martin, Hannah's father, are opposed to their children hanging around together. After a while, things improve and Lance returns to Erinsborough High and Ruth rents Number 32 from Philip. Lance gets a job at a plant nursery, so he can raise some money to send them on holiday in the hope they will get back together.

After denting Karl Kennedy's (Alan Fletcher) car with a shopping cart, Lance takes extra work at the nursery to pay for the damages. He discovers that his boss, Ned Goodman (Brett Tucker), is involved in some illegal activities and Lance's sister Anne urges him to stop Ned. Lance teams up with Toadie, so they can set Anne and Billy Kennedy (Jesse Spencer) up together. Lance finds Ruth and Philip kissing and he takes it very badly, as he hoped his parents would get back together. Ben Atkins (Brett Cousins) arrives in Erinsborough and reveals that he is Ruth's son. Lance agrees to bond with his half-brother. Amy Greenwood (Jacinta Stapleton) shows an interest in Lance and he is thrilled. However, Amy's friends do not like him. Jacinta Myers (Caroline Morgan) frames Lance for printing caricatures of Susan Kennedy (Jackie Woodburne), resulting in Lance's suspension. Toadie and Amy work together to get Jacinta to confess and Susan lifts Lance's suspension.

After returning home from a camping trip, Anne finds a snake in her belongings. Lance tries to save his sister and he is bitten. Lance becomes jealous when Amy begins to spend much time with Drew Kirk (Dan Paris). Philip and Ruth marry and Lance reassures Hannah about their new family. Lance and Amy break up and Lance begins exhibiting strange behaviour. Lance develops a gambling problem and the stress leads him to collapse. Harold Bishop (Ian Smith) offers to be an invigilator when Lance sits his exams at home. Lance's results are not what he expected, but good enough for him to study Horticulture at Eden Hills University. Amy introduces Lance to her boyfriend, Damien Smith (John Ridley), and he begins gambling again. Lance fakes a robbery at Number 26 after he pawns Ruth's fob watch. Lance is ashamed and he writes a letter of apology and begins attending Gamblers Anonymous meetings.

Philip, Ruth and Hannah move to Darwin, so Lance moves in with Toadie and Joel Samuels. Lance reconciles with Amy, but she starts avoiding him and eventually reveals that she has been seeing Damien and that she is pregnant. Lance finds out Anne knew and he stops talking to her, but ultimately is responsible for Amy and Damian getting back together because he wants Amy to be happy and knows it will be with Damien, rather than himself. Both Lance and Toadie compete for Stephanie Scully's (Carla Bonner) attention after she moves into the street. Lance meets Allana Truman (Josephine Clark) at a sci-fi convention and he falls for her. Allana sets Lance the task of completing Seven Labours of Love to win her heart. Lance completes the tasks and he and Allana begin a relationship.

Lance helps Allana get away from her mother and they decide to go travelling in America. Lance enters a radio quiz in order to win some money. He becomes popular with listeners and the radio station bosses decide to feed him the answers, to keep him on air. Lance exposes the scam and he and Allana leave Erinsborough for the United States, where they set up their own sci-fi convention. Four years later, Lance returns to Erinsborough for a Star Trek: Deep Space Nine convention and he decides to visit his old friends. He attends the viewing of Annalise Hartman's (Kimberly Davies) documentary about Ramsay Street and is surprised to see Amy make an appearance. Lance competes with Connor O'Neill (Patrick Harvey) for Toadie's friendship before heading home to Allana. Lance returns thirteen years later to celebrate a belated 1990s-themed 21st birthday party for Toadie, where he, Toadie, Stuart Parker (Blair McDonough) and Stonefish Rebecchi (Anthony Engleman) dress as The Teletubbies. Four years later, Lance sends Toadie and his new wife, Melanie Pearson congratulations in pre-recorded message on their wedding day; while also mentioning Amy; who was back living in Erinsborough at the time, and expressing his wish that one day he and Amy can walk down the aisle. Lance later makes a surprise arrival to the wedding reception, as he and Amy reveal to Toadie that they have actually gotten back together and are planning to have a baby, after taking some advice from Ruth and Philip. Lance also reveals that he recently accepted a job transfer to North Queensland, allowing him and Amy to make a fresh start up north. Off-screen, Lance and Amy become parents to a son, whom they name Kai.

== Reception ==
A writer for the BBC's Neighbours website said Lance's most notable moment was "discovering that a possum had pooed in the veggie ragout" on a camping trip. After Lance was seen dropping a washer into a public pay phone, the Australian national phone company said Neighbours would be found accountable if viewers began to copy the trick. While reviewing Lance's departure, the Herald Sun's Jackie Brygel stated "it's goodbye to one of Ramsay Street's most kind-hearted, er, heart-throbs with the Loveable Lance farewelling his mates in Erinsborough." Brygel was relieved that Lance was going somewhere different to the show's other departees, writing "And where, you may ask, is LL heading? To none other than the US with his main squeeze, Alana. Ah well, at least La La Land is a little further afield than the usual destination for ex-Ramsay Streeters – Queensland."
