= Ben Atkins =

- Neighbours character
- Portrayed by: Brett Cousins
- Duration: 1997–1998
- First appearance: 9 April 1997
- Last appearance: 26 June 1998
- Introduced by: Stanley Walsh
In-universe information
- Other names: Christopher Wilkinson
- Occupation: Mechanic; Carpenter's Mechanics owner; Racing driver
- Father: Geoff Burke
- Mother: Ruth Wilkinson
- Stepfather: Philip Martin
- Brothers: Nicholas Atkins (adoptive)
- Sisters: Caitlin Atkins (adoptive)
- Half-brothers: Lance Wilkinson
- Half-sisters: Anne Wilkinson

Ben Atkins is a fictional character from the Australian soap opera Neighbours, played by Brett Cousins. He made his first appearance during the episode broadcast on 9 April 1997. He departed on 22 May 1998, before making a two-episode guest appearance the following month.

== Casting ==
Cousins had previously appeared in a 50-word guest role not long after he graduated from Deakin University in 1996. Several months later, he went up for the role of Ben and admitted that he "could hardly believe it" when he was told he had the part of Ben, the illegitimate son of Ruth Wilkinson (Ailsa Piper). He told Caron James of TV Week: "It's a big jolt. I've been used to leading a student's life until now. But I enjoy it so much. I can get up at 5 am with a smile on my face, and I sail into work every morning." He made his first appearance as Ben on 9 April 1997.

Cousins became "a local hero" following his casting, as the show is filmed in his home city of Melbourne. He developed a close bond with Piper, and he described her as his surrogate mother. He explained: "When I got the part, everyone told me how vicious and cut-throat the TV industry was. But when I arrived at the studio on my first day, Ailsa ran up to me, gave me this huge hug and said 'Welcome!'. It was definitely a great start!" In a 1998 interview with a reporter from The Weekly News, Cousins revealed how winning the role of Ben left him feeling under constant pressure. He found it difficult to cope with the fame and recognition. He also had to quit his job of teaching abseiling because his work on Neighbours took up too much of his time.

== Development ==
Following his arrival, Ben moves into Number 30 Ramsay Street and he hides a secret, which has something to do with Ruth Wilkinson (Piper). It was later revealed that Ruth was Ben's biological mother. Piper was surprised by the development, saying "I'll never forget the time they told me I was going to have a 21-year-old son and I'd been pregnant at 16. I'd been hiding it all this time." Piper liked that the storyline led to some "meaty scenes" between Ruth and Ben, and that another side to her character was finally shown.

Cousins later explained that Ben's introductory storyline inspired a young female fan to get in contact with her real mother. He said, "It was very sobering to me to know that as an actor you can have that sort of impact on people's lives. I'm really moved by this girl's letters. They're a reminder to me that for every difficult thing that Neighbours brings you as a cast member, it brings 10 times more rewards."

Ben's younger sister Caitlin Atkins (Emily Milburn) was later introduced to show. Caitlin causes various problems for Ben with her troublesome behaviour, such as making up stories about his childhood and spending a number of nights "out on the town." Cousins sympathised with his character, as he has two younger sisters himself. He used his experiences to aid his research for the scenes with Milburn. He also admitted there were "quite a few similarities to the Caitlin thing", but his sisters were not as bad as her.

The last episode to air in Australia before the show's annual Christmas break saw Ben involved in "a horrific car smash" during a motor race. The stunt was the most expensive scene in the show's history at the time. Cousins thought it was a great end to the year, and was grateful that his stunt double took over during filming. As viewers were left with a cliffhanger, Cousins had to deal with people asking him what the outcome for Ben would be. He later visited the UK just as the same episode aired there, and had to deal with the same questions for a second time. Ben is left in a coma following the accident. After he wakes up, Ben is discharged from the hospital, but it takes time for him to fully recover and "piece his shattered life back together."

While he was in the hospital, Ben was visited by a stranger, who Ruth realises is his father Geoff Burke (Andrew McKaige), the man who left her when she fell pregnant. Piper commented that Ruth wants to hit Geoff, as he has never taken an interest in Ben until now. Ruth refuses to let Geoff tell Ben who he is, as she thinks Ben will relapse. The storyline marked Ben's departure from the show, as Cousins filmed his final scenes in April 1998. He leaves for Sydney with Geoff, but later returns to Erinsborough for Ruth and Philip Martin's (Ian Rawlings) wedding. Of his departure, Cousins stated "I was sad to leave the show. I've made some great friends, who I think I will stay close to for the rest of my life." Talking to Nikki White of the Kent Evening Post, Cousins told her that Ben had "a really good innings and a great set of storylines", so he was given an exit worthy of the character, which Cousins was pleased with. He also said that Ben's story was "left open-ended", allowing for the opportunity of a future return.

== Storylines ==
Ben grows up in Adelaide with his parents and siblings Nick (Jason Crewes) and Caitlin. His interest in cars leads him to pursue a career as a mechanic. When Ben discovers he is adopted, he decides to try to find his real mother and leaves Adelaide for Erinsborough. Ben arrives in Ramsay Street after responding to an advertisement for the spare room at Number 30. He encounters his birth mother Ruth, when she literally runs into him after practising rollerblading. Ben soon discovers Ruth has two more children, his half-siblings Anne (Brooke Satchwell) and Lance Wilkinson (Andrew Bibby). After settling in, Ben makes several friends in the area.

When Anne develops a crush on Ben, it puts a strain on her relationship with Billy Kennedy (Jesse Spencer). Ben realises he has to tell her the truth about being her half-brother even if it means hurting her. Anne refuses to believe it when Ben confesses. After Ben reveals the truth about his identity to Ruth, she explains that she was fifteen when she gave birth to him. She wanted to keep him, but her parents forced her to give him up for adoption. Ben understands this and Ruth and Lance are generally accepting of him, Anne however is slower to come around to idea and is still hurt by Ruth keeping the secret. Anne later relents after plans to move in with her father Bill (Ian Stanley Pearce) and his girlfriend fall through.

Ben later takes a job working for Lou Carpenter (Tom Oliver), who buys an old bus to use as a mobile restaurant. This is short-lived as the bus is later burned out by Jamie-Lee Duggan (Josephine Clark) leaving Ben out of work. However, Lou buys a local garage and asks Ben if he wants a partnership in the business. Ben accepts but later has seconds thoughts when Lou begins treating him more like an employee than a partner. Lou's friend, Philip, who is dating Ruth, comes up with a solution that sees Lou and Ben have a 49% share apiece and he looks after the other 2%.

After Ben overhears a telephone conversation between housemate Lisa Elliot (Kate Straub) and her mother, he mistakenly believes she is in love with him and on the night of her leaving party, he kisses her, much to her surprise. Lisa, flattered, explains she was referring to his mechanical skills and tells him she would be interested in a relationship, if she was not about to leave. Ben then falls for Angela Quinton (Fiona McGregor), whom he met at a night club. Within days, he fixes Angela's car for free and offers her Lisa's old room. But just before she moves in, Ben's other housemate Sarah Beaumont (Nicola Charles) breaks the news to him that Angela had got back together with her ex-boyfriend.

Ben and Sarah continue searching for potential tenants but none are suitable until policeman Matt Compton (Jonathon Kovac) applies for the spare room. Ben is hesitant at first but Sarah manages to persuade him to let Matt move in. Within days of moving, things are strained between when the guys when Matt pulls Ben up for failure to renew his driving license on time. Things get even worse between the two when Matt suspects Ben of having dodgy cars in the garage, and begins dating Sarah, making Ben feel like a gooseberry in his own home. However, their mutual love of motor racing brings Ben and Matt together and they become friends just before Matt leaves for a new post in Port Campbell.

When Ben's adoptive parents move to the Middle East temporarily, he is left to care for his younger sister, Caitlin. Ben struggles to act in the role of guardian as Caitlin finds it difficult to settle in and is used to having things done for her, as opposed to living in a share house environment. Ben takes his interest in motor racing for the next level and begins spending more and more time at the race track. Lou offers his support but Ben finds it difficult to be competitive, even when goaded by rival racer Steve Van Eck (Daniel Tobias). After Barry Sheene has a few words of encouragement to Ben, he gets the motivation he needs.

The day of the big race arrives, and many of the Ramsay Street residents show up at Calder Park Raceway to support Ben. As the race begins, Ben begins doing well and manages to hold his place, but is preoccupied with spotting where Steve is in the line-up. Ben fails to notice a car pull out from the pits right in front of him and they collide. The car flips over and bursts into flames. Ben is cut free from the wreck and rushed to hospital. Ben's family await news all night. Ben's operation is a success but he remains comatose.

A mysterious stranger visits Ben, sitting by his bedside and talking to him. The stranger is Geoff Burke, Ben's biological father who read about the incident in the newspaper. Geoff admits his identity to a comatose Ben. After waking up, Ben has no memory of this and Ruth wants it kept that way. Ben is irate when finds out that Geoff was in fact his father, and not a hospital worker as he had believed and he rejects him. However, he realises how lucky he is to be alive and have the chance to get to know both of his natural parents. When Ben is discharged from hospital, He agrees to stay with his family next door after he realizes he would be too much of a burden for his housemates. Geoff decides to stay on and help take care of his son, while getting to know him. Ben finds life challenging when he has to adjust to using a zimmer frame. One day, he falls when getting out of the bath and is forced to wait for Anne to come home to assist him. However, he manages to maintain a positive attitude. Ben's recovery takes a setback when Geoff shows him a video of the crash. When Ben begins to make progress, Geoff decides to return to his family in Sydney and tells Ben he is welcome there any time.

After Ben recovers, he returns to Number 30 which is overcrowded with his older brother, Nick (who came to help with Caitlin) and Toadfish Rebecchi (Ryan Moloney) having moved in during his absence. Ben tries to adjust to sharing a room with Nick, but is unable due to his brother's snoring. Geoff later offers Ben a job running his garage in Sydney and he takes him up on it. Ben is worried about leaving Ruth, but she assures him he needs to get to know Geoff. Ben leaves after a farewell Barbecue. The following month, Ben returns for Ruth's wedding to Philip. In early 1999, Ben later phones Anne and Lance to congratulate them on their exam results.

== Reception ==
For his portrayal of Ben, Cousins earned a nomination for Best Newcomer at the 1998 Inside Soap Awards. The episode featuring Ben's confession about his identity won Best Episode in a Television Drama Serial at the 1997 Australian Film Institute Awards. The award was given to the director of the episode, Peter Dodds.

After his arrival, a Daily Record reporter observed the female characters at Number 30 were "bowled over by their new flatmate". A writer for the same publication noted that Angela's departure "plunges Ben into deep despair". Stephen Murphy of Inside Soap wrote, "You've got to feel sorry for Ben Atkins. Once a happy-go-lucky chap, the likeable mechanic has become a shadow of his former self since his sister Caitlin arrived in town." A writer for the BBC's official Neighbours website stated that Ben's most memorable moment was "Being in a coma after a car accident."
