= Jansen Spencer =

Australian actor

- Born: 25 May 1981 (age 45); Melbourne, Australia
- Occupation: Actor
- Years active: 1987–2011

Jansen Spencer (born 25 May 1981) is a former Australian actor, best known for his role as Paul McClain in the Australian soap opera Neighbours.

== Career ==
In 1997, Spencer heard about the possibility of a role on Neighbours and initially auditioned for a small part, only to receive the part of Paul McClain. Originally slated for only a few guest appearances, he proved so popular they kept him on as a regular until 2001. Paul's exit storyline saw him leaving to play football for the Adelaide Crows.

Spencer performed in a few pantomimes in the UK after his departure from Neighbours. He later reprised his role in a cameo for the soap's 20th anniversary episode, broadcast in July 2005.

Spencer went on to work as a real estate agent on the Sunshine Coast, Queensland.

== Personal life ==
Spencer is married to wife Romany, with whom he has two children.

== Filmography ==
Year	Title	Role	Notes
1987	The Flying Doctors	Jamie Brett	Episode: "Horses for Courses"
1996	Skippy		
1997	Newlyweds	Guest appearance	
1997–2001; 2005	Neighbours	Paul McClain	Series regular
2002	Blue Heelers	Robbie Hart	Episode: "Broken Dreams"
2005	Holly's Heroes	Cousin Vito	Episode: "Three Man Weave"
2010	Rush	Dimitrius / Gunman	Episodes: "Cooked", "Crash"
2011	Winners & Losers	Jim	Episode: "Covert Aggression in Netball"
2011	Yes I Can		Short film

== Theatre ==
Year	Title	Role	Type
1999–2000	Cinderella	Prince Charming	Lyceum Theatre, Sheffield
2000–2004	Snow White & the Seven Dwarfs	The Prince	Swansea Grand Theatre, Hull New Theatre, Kings Theatre, Southsea
2001–2002	Cinderella	Prince Charming	His Majesty's Theatre, Aberdeen
