= Billy Kennedy (Neighbours) =

Fictional character from the Australian soap opera Neighbours

- Neighbours character
- Portrayed by: Jesse Spencer
- Duration: 1994–2000, 2005, 2022
- First appearance: 27 September 1994
- Last appearance: 28 July 2022
- Introduced by: Ian Bradley (1994); Ric Pellizerri (2005); Jason Herbison (2022)
In-universe information
- Occupation: Student; Lifeguard; Carpenter
- Family: Kennedy
- Father: Karl Kennedy
- Mother: Susan Kennedy
- Brothers: Malcolm Kennedy
- Sisters: Libby Kennedy
- Half-sisters: Holly Hoyland
- Wife: Anne Wilkinson
- Children: 3
- Sons: Jackson Kennedy
- Grandfathers: Ronald Davies-Smythe; Tom Kennedy (adoptive)
- Grandmothers: Molly Kennedy; Grace Smith
- Aunts: Carmel Tyler; Liz Conway; Jemima Davies-Smythe
- Nephews: Ben Kirk
- Nieces: Susannah Kennedy
- First cousins: Darcy Tyler; Elly Conway; Bea Nilsson; Trudy Callhoun
- Other relatives: Aster Conway; Jasper Callhoun

Billy Kennedy is a fictional character from the Australian soap opera Neighbours, played by Jesse Spencer. He made his first appearance on 27 September 1994, arriving in Ramsay Street with his family. He departed on 5 April 2000, but made a small cameo for the show's 20th anniversary episode broadcast on 27 July 2005, and for the show's then final episode on 28 July 2022.

== Creation and casting ==
In 1994, the Neighbours storyliners decided to introduce a new "solid" family called the Kennedys. The family, which consisted of five members – a mother, father, two sons and a daughter – moved into Number 28 Ramsay Street. The storyliners felt that they needed to take the show back to its roots, as it seemed that all the houses on the street were populated with misfits and distant relatives. Alan Fletcher and Jackie Woodburne were cast in the roles of parents Karl and Susan, while Benjamin McNair and Kym Valentine were cast as teenagers Malcolm and Libby. Jesse Spencer was cast as Billy, the youngest member of the Kennedys. Spencer originally auditioned for the role of Brett Stark, but was told that he was too young. The following year, he successfully auditioned for the role of Billy.

== Development ==
=== Relationship with Melissa Drenth ===
Billy's first long-term love interest was his school friend Melissa Drenth (Aimee Robertson). Their relationship got off to "a shaky start", especially when Billy's father gave him a hard time about it. Spencer was glad that his character was given a girlfriend, saying "It's about time. At last he's acting his age. Getting a girlfriend should help him become a bit more mature. He's not going to be the naive country boy any longer. There's no doubt Billy's completely smitten." When Melissa mother found a packet of condoms in Melissa's school bag, she called for an end to the relationship. However, she did not know that Billy and Melissa had not yet had sex, as they had had problems finding a suitable place. Billy's brother, Mal, offered the couple the use of his house, but Billy and Melissa were interrupted by Mal's girlfriend, Danni Stark (Eliza Szonert) and Angie Rebecchi (Lesley Baker).

Melissa received a "telling-off" from her mother over the condoms and the couple's plans to have sex were put on hold. When their parents began to fear that the relationship was getting "too serious", Billy and Melissa promised that they would wait to have sex. However, they later realised that they could not wait and they went to Billy's bedroom. A Grundy Television spokesperson commented "When it comes to the crunch Billy can't go through with it. Melissa flees in tears and Billy is convinced she will want nothing to do with him after his flop in bed." The BBC cut the scenes ahead of broadcast in the UK, fearing they were "too raunchy" for the early evening timeslot. Billy and Melissa eventually broke up when Billy discovered she was cheating on him. Melissa departed the show shortly after.

=== Relationship with Anne Wilkinson ===
Billy was later paired with Anne Wilkinson (Brooke Satchwell), who moved into Ramsay Street with her mother and brother. Spencer thought the relationship lasted so long because the couple shared so much. Billy and Anne lived in the same street, had the same friends, went to the same school and grew up together. Spencer said "In the early days, our relationship seemed perfect, but, as we've got older and wiser, there have been more problems."

Billy became the centre of a love triangle following the arrival of Caitlin Atkins (Emily Milburn). One of Caitlin's top priorities, upon moving to Erinsborough, was to find a boyfriend and she set her sights on Billy, her training partner at the pool. Milburn said Caitlin fell for Billy immediately and she did not care that he was dating Anne. Caitlin wanted Billy and she was prepared to "go all out" and get him. Satchwell told Steven Murphy from Inside Soap that neither Anne nor Caitlin were prepared to back down over Billy. As Caitlin and Billy began swimming together more, they grew closer and Anne could see that Billy was attracted to Caitlin. Billy later shared a kiss with Caitlin, which Anne witnessed. Billy and Anne then briefly split up. Satchwell thought that it would have made everyone's lives easier if Billy and Anne had just sat down and talked about their relationship problems in the first place.

=== Departure and cameo appearances ===
Spencer chose to depart Neighbours in November 1999. Speaking of his decision to leave, Spencer said "I'd been in Neighbours for five years and I'd had enough. The storylines were boring and I wasn't enjoying it any more. When I said I was leaving, I hoped they would make Bill's departure interesting - but he just moves away from Erinsborough, there's no drama to it. It's disappointing and typical of the last two years of storylines." Spencer revealed that the door had been left open for a possible return in the future. Spencer later said that Neighbours had been "a launchpad" for him.

In 2005, Spencer reprised his role and became one of many former members who made a return to Neighbours to appear in the show's 20th anniversary episode "Friends for Twenty Years". Spencer could not return to Australia to shoot his cameo because of his filming commitments in Los Angeles. Instead, he got a costume and asked a friend to film him on Malibu Beach, where he pretended Billy was on holiday, and sent it to the producers.

Four years later, Spencer revealed that he had been approached about a return to the show and said he would not rule out a one-off appearance. He later agreed to reprise the role for a cameo appearance in the show's then final episode, which was broadcast on 28 July 2022.

== Storylines ==
Billy arrives in Ramsay Street with his family after his father, Karl, buys Number 28 at an auction. Billy soon makes friends with Toadfish Rebecchi (Ryan Moloney) and Hannah Martin (Rebecca Ritters) and meets his first girlfriend, Melissa Drenth. Billy breaks up with Melissa when she reveals her homophobia towards his teacher, Andrew Watson (Christopher Uhlmann) who was trying to help him after he was diagnosed with dyslexia. Billy and Toadie become best friends and create a pirate radio station together. When Amy Greenwood (Jacinta Stapleton) arrives and the Wilkinson twins, Lance (Andrew Bibby) and Anne, a new group of friends is born. Billy and Anne fall in love with some help from Lance and Toadie and they became inseparable. Billy joins the local pool as a life guard and takes Anne there one night for a romantic date. The couple also enter a Perfect Couple competition, but Billy gets cold feet when it comes to the photoshoot and Lance fills in for him. When Caitlin Atkins (Emily Milburn) arrives she wastes no time in admitting her feelings for Billy and they even share a kiss.

Billy plans to leave school and move out of home, but Anne and his parents are not keen on the idea. Shortly after, Billy and Anne receive letters for university placements and Anne is placed in Queensland. Billy misses Anne while she is away and enters a kissing contest with Amy to win the prize money and fund a trip to see her. Billy later realises that he has a talent for carpentry and Karl gives him a loan to start his own business. Billy and Anne drift apart and she moves into an artist's studio. When Billy's workshop is trashed, he realises that he had left the door unlocked and would not be covered by the insurance. Billy then begins work on a building site, but after a near-death accident he speaks up about the safety of the site. This makes Anne proud and they begin to repair their friendship, but when Anne tells Billy that she would go out with David "Fanto" Hodges (Daniel Dinnen) if he asked, Billy decides to get her out of his system.

Felicity Scully (Holly Valance) takes an interest in Billy, but realises that he is not over Anne and quickly backs off. Billy creates a new kitchen table for the Scully family and, despite Joe Scully's (Shane Connor) protests, the table stays in the Scully kitchen. Billy is then offered an apprenticeship by Greg Mast (Roy Thompson) a woodworker in Queensland. Toadie arranges a trip to Luna Park for the old gang and they all say their goodbyes. Anne is sad that Billy is leaving and they try to make a long-distance relationship work. Anne transfers to a nearby university instead and she surprises Billy at the train station. The couple vow to stay together forever. Five years later, Billy appears in Annalise Hartman's (Kimberly Davies) documentary about Ramsay Street, and says hello to his parents whilst he and Anne are on holiday.

Seventeen years later, Billy sends a video congratulating Toadie on his wedding to Melanie Pearson (Lucinda Cowden).

== Reception ==
Spencer earned several award nominations for his portrayal of Billy. In 1998, he received a nomination for Most Popular Actor at the Logie Awards. He received another nomination in the same category the following year. At the 1999 Inside Soap Awards, Spencer was nominated for Best Actor, while he and Satchwell earned a joint nomination for Best Couple. He also garnered a nomination for Favourite Teen Idol at the People's Choice Awards.

A writer for the BBC's Neighbours website stated that Billy's most notable moment was "Setting up a pirate radio station." Spencer's looks made him a teen idol during his time with series. A writer for Virgin Media called Billy a teen heartthrob during a feature called 'Who is soapland's hottest hunk?'. During a feature called "Neighbours stars make it big", a contributor for Holy Soap said "Billy's gorgeous looks and sweet romance with Anne Wilkinson ensured his popularity among Neighbours fans". Paul Brooks from Soaplife included Billy and Anne in his list of "dream lovers". He assessed that "the emotional ups and downs of Bill and Anne are almost a soap on their own." In November 1999, an All About Soap critic praised Spencer and Satchwell's performance stating that "if Jason and Kylie were the soapworld's sweethearts in the 1980s, then their crown has undoubtedly been passed onto Jesse and Brooke, alias teenage lovers Billy Kennedy and Anne Wilkinson."

In 2010, to celebrate Neighbours' 25th anniversary, a writer for Sky profiled 25 characters of which they believed were the most memorable in the series history. Billy is included in the list and describing him the writer states: "Easygoing Billy didn't take life as seriously as the rest of his family did, preferring to hang with Hannah in the club house and get into scrapes with best mate Toadie. Though troubled by dyslexia and asthma, he was a hard worker, spending lots of time swimming. This somewhat inevitably helped him to, ahem, 'fill out', and lead to lots of him, Ben's sister Caitlin and spontaneous lodger Joel wandering around the Kennedy house with very few clothes on. He eventually left the Street with boring sweetheart Anne."
