= Drew Kirk =

- Neighbours character
- Portrayed by: Dan Paris
- Duration: 1998–2002, 2005
- First appearance: 27 March 1998
- Last appearance: 16 December 2005
- Introduced by: Stanley Walsh (1998); Ric Pellizerri (2005)
- Spin-off appearances: Neighbours vs Zombies (2014)
In-universe information
- Occupation: Carpenter's Mechanics employee and owner Bouncer
- Father: Ron Kirk
- Mother: Rose Kirk
- Brothers: Stuart Kirk; Dougal Kirk
- Sisters: Sally Kirk
- Wife: Libby Kennedy (2001–2002)
- Sons: Ben Kirk
- Aunts: Janet Kirk
- Other relatives: Minnie Kirk; Fergus MacLeod

Andrew "Drew" Kirk is a fictional character from the Australian soap opera Neighbours, played by Dan Paris. Following his decision to move into acting, Paris won the role of Drew after attending his first ever audition. He admitted that he initially found filming difficult, as he was not sure what he was doing. He made his first screen appearance during the episode broadcast on 27 March 1998.

Drew was a country boy from a farm in Oakey. Upon arriving in Erinsborough, Drew found employment at the local garage. Drew was portrayed as nice, naive and loyal. Paris shared many similarities with his character and they came from similar backgrounds. Drew was also known for his long hair, which gave him a "hippy look". The character began a relationship with established character Libby Kennedy (Kym Valentine), which eventually saw them marry and have a child together.

Paris chose to leave Neighbours in 2002 to pursue new challenges and Drew made his final on-screen appearance during the episode broadcast on 13 September 2002, but was killed off in the next episode. Three years later, Paris reprised his role and Drew began appearing in Stephanie Scully's (Carla Bonner) dreams. A Daily Record reporter called Drew's return "an X Files style plot". In 2014, Drew appeared as a zombie in the webisode spinoff Neighbours vs Zombies.

== Casting ==
Shortly after former model Dan Paris made the decision to move into acting, he began asking his agent to send him to castings and Neighbours was the first show he auditioned for. Paris won the role of Drew straight away. He called the transition from modelling to acting "easy" and thought it was a natural progression. He was contracted until March 2002. Paris trained with a drama coach for a week before he filmed his first scenes. He initially found the work hard, saying "I had no idea what I was doing when I started. I thought all I would have to do was go in a say my lines, but it turned out to be a lot harder than that." It took Paris almost a year to work out what the cameras were doing and where he should stand, but he finally relaxed when he got the hang of it. Paris made his television debut as Drew in March 1998.

== Development ==
=== Characterisation ===
Drew is a country boy who works on a farm in Oakey. He comes to Erinsborough to stay with his aunt Janet (Roberta Connelly) and is later hired by Lou Carpenter (Tom Oliver) to work at Carpenter Mechanics, replacing Ben Atkins (Brett Cousins). James Joyce of the Newcastle Herald said Drew was a "suitably spunky rival for established stud Ben, who thinks his boss has shafted him as he recovers from his car accident." A writer for the BBC said Drew initially had a hard time adjusting to city life and working for Lou was not an easy task. Colin Vickery of the Herald Sun noted that once the women of Erinsborough see Drew, their cars "suddenly" start having problems which only he can fix. Paris commented: "Drew's more than slightly naive. He thinks these women are coming to him because he's good at fixing cars!"

Illawarra Mercury writer, Denise Everton, described Drew as "eternally nice, naive and gorgeous." Jason Herbison from Inside Soap observed that Paris shared many similarities with Drew, most notably his loyalty, sense of humour and that they were both from the Australian outback and preferred the outdoors. Paris said that unlike himself, Drew was more traditional when it came to things like marriage and starting a family. The character was known for his long hair, which gave him a "hippy look". When Paris asked producers if he could cut his hair, they turned down his request and invoked his contract, saying they did not want to upset Paris's female fans. A BBC insider commented "They don't want to allow a make-over that could be a turn-off."

=== Marriage to Libby Kennedy ===
Drew developed a crush on Libby Kennedy (Kym Valentine), but he decided to take his time courting her. Paris admitted that Drew had never wanted someone as much as Libby and that he would stop at nothing to get her. Valentine added that Drew understood Libby and she finally allowed herself to let her guard down around him. Drew and Libby eventually began a relationship during a trip to Drew's home town of Oakey. Paris and Valentine knew their characters would be getting together, but became worried when it took longer than they had anticipated. Both Drew and Libby worried that a relationship would ruin their good friendship and Paris told an All About Soap writer that the couple's romance started out with them exploiting each other's differences and working out how to deal with each other's likes and dislikes. Paris believed Drew and Libby's relationship would last.

Shortly after getting engaged to Drew, Libby was involved in a motorbike accident that left her with internal bleeding. Paris explained that Drew was obviously concerned for his fiancée, but when he was told by the doctors that Brendan Bell (Blair Venn) was responsible, he had to confront him. Drew managed to get Brendan to almost confess to causing the accident, but Brendan then unexpectedly died from his injuries. Libby then took a turn for the worse and developed a fever and began hallucinating. The doctors tried to play it down, but Libby's father Karl (Alan Fletcher) knew how serious it was and told Drew there was a chance Libby could die. Paris called the situation "difficult" and said Drew felt helpless as he willed Libby to pull through. Both Paris and Valentine thought the storyline was exciting to play out and Paris added that he had done some of best work because of the emotional content involved.

Libby decided to call off the wedding, after she learned that the injuries she sustained in the accident may have left her infertile. Paris confirmed that Drew was unprepared for Libby's announcement. Although he had noticed that she had begun pulling away from him, he had put it down to what she was going through. Paris continued "He doesn't seriously believe that she's having second thoughts about their future together." Libby told Drew that the accident made her re-evaluate her life and she realised that she no longer loved him, therefore she could not go ahead with the wedding. An Inside Soap columnist observed that Libby's news left Drew "bewildered and devastated." Paris agreed, and said Drew knew there was something more to Libby's decision, but the more he asked about it, the more Libby pushed him away. Paris believed Drew would be patient, but if Libby did not give him a chance, then Drew would be forced to move on and forget her. Paris added that he was shocked when he learned of the storyline and was not sure how it would turn out.

Drew and Libby got back together and their wedding finally went ahead, after fans asked for it. Producers decided that the wedding would go without a hitch, but saved a few surprises for afterwards. Drew and Libby's wedding was "celebrated in Scottish splendour" and Drew sung a traditional Scottish song during the reception. Paris was dismayed to learn that the producers wanted him to sing on-screen, as he had never done it before. He explained "I thought I'd kind of talked them out of it. But when they said they wanted to go ahead with it, I asked if we could at least play it up that I wasn't any good at singing and not make it serious." Paris thought the producers might regret asking him, but he said the scene was edited together well and called it "a tearjerker."

=== Departure ===
In late June 2002, Herbison reported Paris had filmed his final scenes for Neighbours. Herbison confirmed that Drew was to be killed off in a cliffhanger episode, after Paris decided to exit the show to pursue "fresh challenges". Paris said that after appearing in over 1,000 episodes, he did not think there was anything left for his character to do. He explained "I've taken the character as far as he can go, and personally, I've learned about as much as I can. I'm now in the frame of mind to do other things." Drew died in hospital after falling from a horse. Years later, Paris explained to Andrew Bucklow of News.com.au that his desire to continue travelling around Australia with his partner and spend more time outside the studio were the deciding factors in his departure. He told Bucklow that he asked for his character to be killed off, saying "They said to me that obviously if I was killed off that I couldn't come back. And I said, 'You know what? I think I need the door shut because I know that when the money runs out that I'm going to want to come back.' I needed to do other things in life and at the time that felt really right." He admitted that he did not watch or even hear about Drew's funeral when it aired.

== Storylines ==
Drew comes to Erinsborough to stay with his aunt and he gets a job working for Lou Carpenter at Carpenter Mechanics, replacing Ben Atkins. When Drew mentions that he is keen on growing his own stuff, and that rural people prefer plants to alcohol, Lou becomes suspicious and immediately suspects Drew of growing marijuana. However, he discovers Drew is only growing tomato plants.

Lou and Drew soon become close friends. His interest in Libby Kennedy is apparent to several people before Drew realises it, and it was some time before he make a move on Libby. Their relationship ends after Libby is critically injured in a motorcycle accident, believing she would never be able to have children. They get back together and ultimately have son Ben, although both mother and baby came close to death.

While Drew and Libby are in Oakey, Drew falls from his horse. He later dies in hospital from internal injuries and Libby is devastated. During Drew's funeral, Libby places a flower on his coffin and begins to sing "Wild Mountain Thyme", while remembering Drew singing it to her at their wedding the previous year.

Drew briefly returns as a vision to Stephanie Scully (Carla Bonner) in her dreams to warn her that her cancer is active.

== Other appearances ==
On 18 September 2014, it was confirmed that Paris had reprised his role as Drew to appear in the webisode series Neighbours vs Zombies. Paris was transformed into a zombie with the help of make-up and he was reunited with Alan Fletcher and Jackie Woodburne who played Drew's in-laws Karl and Susan Kennedy. Of his return, Paris commented "This was just too much fun to pass up and it was great to see Alan and Jackie again, it was as if no time had passed – not unlike how a zombie feels I guess."

== Reception ==
Viewers voted Drew the second Best Male Under 30 and the second Sexiest Male in the 1999 Neighbours.com Awards. For his portrayal of Drew, Paris won Best Aussie Actor at the 2000 Australian Inside Soap Awards. In June 2002, Drew came fourth in a poll run by Newsround to find viewer's favourite Neighbours character. He received 11.57% of the vote.

Of the character's debut, the Herald Sun's Colin Vickery observed: "Neighbours gets a hunky new resident tomorrow night. He's virile young mechanic Andrew (Drew) Kirk and Ramsay St's female hearts are in a flutter." Vickery also branded the character a "heart-throb". A writer for the BBC's website said Drew's most notable moments were "Finally marrying Libby. The birth of his son Ben. Rescuing Lolly from a fire. Being killed."

A Virgin Media contributor included Drew in their feature on "Soap's most tragic deaths", they said "Even if you didn't shed a tear when Neighbours hottie Drew died after falling off his horse in his hometown of Oakey, nothing could have stopped the emotions when his wife Libby sang at his funeral a few days later." Of Drew exit, Cameron Adams from the Herald Sun quipped "Erinsborough isn't big enough for two hotties, so with Blair now on Ramsay St, it's time for Dan Paris (Drew) to exit." Remarking on how quick the character's departure occurs, The Daily Telegraph's Darren Devlyn stated "It's rare that a soap will dispense with one of its key characters within one episode. Dead and buried in 30 minutes." He thought Drew's death would be "a quick, sharp shock to viewers".

A reporter for the Daily Record was less than impressed by Drew's 2005 return, saying "The Erinsborough-based soap has been accused of having far-fetched storylines – and it outdoes itself this week as, in an X Files style plot, Steph continues to have dreams of Drew, Libby's long-dead husband."
