= Hannah Martin =

- Neighbours character
- Portrayed by: Rebecca Ritters
- Duration: 1992–1999, 2005
- First appearance: 20 July 1992
- Last appearance: 27 July 2005
- Introduced by: Don Battye (1992); Ric Pellizerri (2005)
In-universe information
- Occupation: Student
- Family: Robinson
- Father: Philip Martin
- Mother: Julie Martin
- Stepmother: Ruth Wilkinson
- Half-brothers: Michael Martin
- Half-sisters: Debbie Martin
- Grandfathers: Roger Bannon; Jim Robinson (adoptive)
- Grandmothers: Anne Robinson
- Uncles: Paul Robinson; Scott Robinson; Glen Donnelly
- Aunts: Lucy Robinson; Jill Ramsay
- First cousins: Andrew Robinson
- Other relatives: Helen Daniels; Rosemary Daniels; Wayne Duncan

Hannah Martin is a fictional character from the Australian soap opera Neighbours, played by Rebecca Ritters. She made her first on-screen appearance on 20 July 1992. Hannah is the only child of Philip and Julie Martin and the younger sister to Michael and Debbie. The Martin family were written out in 1999 and Hannah departed on 20 October 1999. In 2005, Ritters reprised her role for a brief cameo in the show's 20th anniversary episode.

== Casting ==
Ritters joined the cast of Neighbours when she was eight years old. Her school teacher had suggested that she join an agency and she got the part of Hannah within a couple of months, after her first professional audition. Ritters said "It was all a bit unexpected. I never had acting classes, but I did a school play once."

Ritters took a five-month break from the show in 1998 and she said she really enjoyed it. She added that she had the chance to go to school every day and have a social life, instead of being tutored on set with her co-stars. In February 1999, Inside Soap reported that producers were going to give Hannah a makeover to make her appear more mature, before Ritters stepped in front of the cameras again.

In September 1999, Inside Soap reported that the Martin family had been written out of Neighbours and that they had already filmed their final scenes. In April 2005, Ritters reprised her role as Hannah for Neighbours' 20th anniversary episode in July of that year.

== Storylines ==
Hannah arrives with her parents for Todd Landers' (Kristian Schmid) funeral but the family are lost along some country roads. When Hannah remarks that she sees Helen Daniels, her parents ignore her but on the way back, they find Helen who was held hostage by Todd's father Bob (Bruce Kilpatrick) and abandoned on the roadside. The Martins are going through financial difficulties and Hannah struggles to make friends at school and begins hating the area. However, she befriends Toby Mangel (Ben Geurens). While selling Lollipops for charity with Toby after school one day, Hannah is grabbed by Raymond Chambers (Greg Parker) who attempts to abduct her but Toby foils him. Further drama comes when Hannah discovers Chambers is Julie's old boss. Julie and Philip initially disbelieve her but they report the matter to the police. Further drama ensues when neighbour Cameron Hudson (Benjamin Grant Mitchell) represents Chambers and he is cleared. However, Chambers later confesses after trying to abduct another young girl and the matter is resolved.

Michael (Troy Beckwith), Hannah's half-brother returns home for the school holidays and there is a deep animosity between the two as Michael resents Julie for marrying Philip so soon after his mother Loretta's (Lyn Semmler) death. Michael then spikes Hannah's orange juice with Jim Robinson's (Alan Dale) vodka and is soon packed off to boarding school. On Michael's next visit, Hannah is so scared after he attempts to kill Julie, she calls the police and Michael is arrested and imprisoned for six months. Hannah finds her life in danger when she and Beth Brennan are trapped in a burning cottage behind Lassiter's and are rescued by Brad Willis (Scott Michaelson).

When Michael is paroled, everyone is willing to make an effort, however Hannah resents his presence and tells him she does not want him in the house. Michael decides to leave but Hannah apologises and agrees to give him a chance they put the past behind them. Hannah experiences tragedy when Julie dies after falling from a tower while away on a murder mystery weekend with Philip and Debbie. She blames herself for Julie's death as well as Jim's, as he had been playing with her before he died. The Kennedy family move in next door and Hannah befriends the youngest son, Billy Kennedy (Jesse Spencer) and develops a crush on him. Billy becomes uncomfortable with Hannah's attraction to him and in order for Hannah to take a hint, he begins seeing Nicole Cahill (Andrea McEwan) which Hannah witnesses, leaving her hurt.

Philip begins dating again, seeing Molly Harrison (Robyn Hughan), a woman he met in the newsagency. Hannah goes out of her way to break up Philip and Molly to the extent of spiking her dinner with chilli causing her to have a bad reaction to the mixture. Hannah's behaviour worsens and she begins treating classmate Robert Dong (Nelson Leongue) badly. Philip realises the effect of his relationship with Molly and stops seeing her and Hannah realises how selfish she is being. Hannah responds positively when Philip begins dating Jen Handley but the relationship lasts a short while. Hannah begins seeing Lance Wilkinson (Andrew Bibby) but ends the relationship when he brags about how far he has really gone with her. However, Lance and Hannah find themselves back in each other's lives when Philip begins dating Lance's mother, Ruth, who treats Helen after she suffers a stroke. Hannah is devastated when Helen dies the following year.

Hannah struggles to adjust when Philip and Ruth marry, and Lance and his sister Anne move in. She feels Ruth is trying to replace Julie and is constantly hostile towards her despite reassuring she is not. Hannah decides she wants to spend time in France with her friend Claire Girard (Adele Schober) for six months. Philip is against it at first but agrees. At the airport, Paul McClain (Jansen Spencer) declares his feelings for her and they share a kiss. On her return, Hannah has visibly changed, sporting short hair and bringing a new attitude home with her. It takes several weeks for her to readjust to life in Erinsborough and she and Paul resume their relationship. However, when Paul obsesses over BMX riding, Hannah breaks up with him and takes an interest in John "Teabag" Teasdale (Nathan Phillips), much to Philip's chagrin. Hannah is shocked when Philip and Ruth decide that they plan to move to Darwin and refuses to go, and is determined to stay when she realises Lance and Anne are staying put. Teabag offers to let Hannah stay with him but after she sees his place, she declines. On the night before the Martins' departure, Hannah is distressed when Helen's ring goes missing. Ruth finds it and Hannah is overjoyed. She and Paul spend the night in her cubby house in the backyard and discuss old times. The following morning before the Martins leave for Darwin, Hannah and Paul share one final kiss and agree to keep in touch. Six years later, Hannah makes a brief cameo in Annalise Hartman's (Kimberley Davies) documentary where she is revealed to be living in London and discusses her experiences of living in Ramsay Street.

== Reception ==
For her portrayal of Hannah, Ritters was nominated for "Best Young Actor" at the 1999 Inside Soap Awards. The BBC said Hannah's most notable moment was "First noticing that Helen had died."

In 2010, to celebrate Neighbours' 25th anniversary British satellite broadcasting company, Sky, profiled twenty-five characters of which they believed were the most memorable in the series history and Hannah was included in the list. Sky were critical of her storylines making note that her plots were limited, stating "Neighbours isn't exactly great at pre-teen characters – just look at the current nails-down-the-blackboard lot – and Hannah Martin wasn't any different, just longer-lasting. Most plots revolved around one of three scenarios: either Hannah was crying because no-one liked her at school; Hannah was crying because she was fighting with Debbie; or Hannah was crying because dad Phil was out on a date. She was last seen in the 2005 anniversary video living in London, so if you see an Australian crying there, you know what's going on."

Reporters for the Herald Sun said Hannah was "who many consider to be the most annoying character ever on the soap." Katie Baillie writing for Metro included Hannah on a list of the "worst Neighbours characters" ever. Baillie stated that the character was a "snob" when she returned from France and that "whining" Hannah deserved second place because "my GOD Hannah was annoying. She was ALWAYS getting herself in stupid situations." A writer from The New Zealand Herald called her a "frizzy-haired schoolgirl". Fiona Day from Closer called Hannah a "Tempestuous teen" who was "an integral part of the soap" and noted that "life really does imitate art" due to both Hannah and the actress moving to Europe.
