= Illawarra Mercury =

Australian newspaper

- Type: Daily newspaper
- Format: Tabloid
- Owner(s): Australian Community Media
- Founded: 1855
- Headquarters: AHM Building; 77 Market Street; Wollongong NSW 2500
- ISSN: 1443-900X
- Website: illawarramercury.com.au

The Illawarra Mercury is a daily newspaper serving the Illawarra region of New South Wales, Australia. It has been published since 1855, making it one of Australia's oldest newspapers and the second-oldest regional newspaper in New South Wales. It has been published daily since December 1949, and has had no local daily competition since the 1960s. It has strong links to the Illawarra community.

Under editor Peter Cullen, the Mercury was jocularly known as The Mockery among Illawarra residents for its poor copy editing, resulting in frequent typographical errors. As a result, it became a running gag on the ABC's Media Watch in the period when Stuart Littlemore hosted the programme. The Mercury is published in the standard Australian tabloid format, with each page having an approximate size of A3.

The Mercury has had several Walkley Award winners on staff, most recently journalists Mario Christodoulou (2008), Nicole Hasham and Laurel-Lee Roderick (2010), and photographer Sylvia Liber (2014).

The paper has often supported Labor at state and federal elections, but backed the Liberal Party for the 2011 New South Wales state election. It has links to neither party. Alistair Langford-Wilson became editor in April 2012.

The Illawarra Mercury is owned by Australian Community Media, though the newspaper is editorially independent. Fairfax Media became a major shareholder in 1962 only to later acquire the paper in 1969. Fairfax merged with Nine Entertainment in 2018.

== History ==
The Illawarra Mercury was established by Thomas Garrett and W. F. Cahill in 1855. The first issue was printed as 8 large folio pages and was circulated on 8 October 1855. Initially the newspaper was published once a week then increased to twice weekly in 1929. During the 1930s the depression had a significant effect on the region and forced the newspaper to revert to a weekly publication. It wasn’t until 1950 that the newspaper increased its publication to a daily paper; this led to the newspaper changing its name to the Illawarra Daily Mercury, which lasted until 1954. In 1979 and after having dropped the "Daily" from its title the Illawarra Mercury officially became a metropolitan daily newspaper.

One of the significant events of the newspaper includes the amalgamation with the Bulli Times and Port Kembla Pilot in February 1949. The paper also later merged with the South Coast Times in 1968.

In 1981 the Illawarra Mercury acquired a new offset press that allowed the newspaper to be brought to life in full colour. As technology emerged an order was placed in 1988 for a new electronic colour scanner which would enhance the newspaper's production and appearance. It was the first newspaper in Australia to use the state-of-the-art Itek 210S scanner.

In 2012 Fairfax relocated the editorial production, involving subeditors and page layout, of Illawarra Mercury to New Zealand.

== Proprietors ==
- Thomas Garrett
- John Curr
- Archibald Campbell
- Joseph Hart
- Margaret Campbell
- Edward Allen
- Standish Musgrave
- Wilfrid Musgrave
- R Henderson
- John Fairfax Ltd
- Ron Steward
- Corinne Whiteman

== Readership ==
Despite being marketed towards residents of the Illawarra and surrounding regions, it can be purchased throughout the Sydney metropolitan region where it is popular due to the high quality of its horse-racing and sport coverage.

== Awards ==
In 2005 The Mercury was named Newspaper of the year 20,000-50,000 circ. by the Pacific Area Newspaper Publisher's association PANPA.

In 2004 the Illawarra Mercury won the Walkley Award for Investigative Journalism and the Pacific Area Newspapers Publishers’ Association Marketing prize.

Its editorial cartoonist, Vince O'Farrell, has won international awards for his work - his cartoon immediately after the 11 September 2001 attacks depicting tears rolling down the Statue of Liberty's cheeks is one example. O'Farrell is a six-time winner of the Rotary cartoons award.

The Illawarra Mercury in 1972 won two of the State’s leading newspaper awards – a W. A. Richard award for technical excellence in newspaper production and a "certificate of merit in journalism".

== Archives ==
The newspaper is available on microfilm at Wollongong City Library and the State Library of New South Wales. It has been digitised by the National Library of Australia under its Newspaper Digitisation Program.

== Digitisation ==
The issues of this paper from 1856 to 1954 have been digitised as part of the Australian Newspapers Digitisation Program project of the National Library of Australia.

== Endorsements ==
National election	Endorsement
2025	Labor

== See also ==
- List of newspapers in Australia
