= Ian Rawlings =

Australian actor

- Born: 9 March 1959 (age 67); Whyalla, South Australia, Australia
- Occupation: Actor
- Years active: 1982−2023
- Known for: Wayne Hamilton in Sons and Daughters; Philip Martin in Neighbours
- Spouse: Lee Dowling (1984−present)
- Children: 2

Ian Rawlings (born 9 March 1959) is an Australian former actor. He is best known for his long-running roles in soap operas Sons and Daughters and Neighbours. He also appeared in the short-lived serial The Power, The Passion.

== Early life ==
Rawlings was born on 9 March 1959, in Whyalla, South Australia. He has four brothers and a sister. Rawlings played Australian rules football for Whyalla in the South Australian northern league. He developed a keen interest in betting on horse racing after his father and grandfather took him to the races in Adelaide when he was eight years old. He also developed an interest in greyhound racing when he was 14, and went onto own and train a number of dogs along with his siblings. He was only interested in racing and training the dogs and not the gambling side of the sport.

Rawlings worked as a storeman in Adelaide for a computer company, before becoming a model when he was 18. He also worked loading trucks at a large freight company, and as a tow-truck driver.

== Career ==
Rawlings had little acting experience when he signed for the Grundy Organisation in 1981 to play Wayne Hamilton in Sons and Daughters. He had spent two years trying to secure substantial acting work, and appeared in several amateur productions and as an extra in films produced by the South Australian Film Corporation. He was initially contracted for 15 weeks. In 1985, Rawlings also portrayed his character's look-alike Gary Evans. That same year, he won the Logie Award for Best Supporting Actor in A Series. Rawlings continued in the role of Wayne for the show's entire 1982–1987 run. Ahead of production ending in March 1987, Rawlings formed his own production company, after completing a producers course at the Australian Film and Television School.

In 1989, Rawlings appeared in the short-lived Seven Network soap opera The Power, The Passion as Ryan McAllister. After The Power, The Passion was cancelled, Rawlings took on a job as a salesman at the freight company he previously worked for prior to his acting career taking off. He said it was a "natural place to go back to" with no acting work forthcoming. He found that being well known to the public helped him with sales.

In 1992, Rawlings had a guest role as Marcus Stone in the Network Ten soap opera Neighbours. A few months later, he joined the main cast as Philip Martin, taking over the role from Christopher Milne. Rawlings played Philip until 1999. He briefly reprised this role in episodes commemorating the programme's 20th anniversary in 2005. Rawlings reprised the role for the Neighbours vs Time Travel webseries in 2017. Rawlings made a cameo appearance in the final episode of Neighbours in mid-2022, and again in late 2023, when the series was picked up once again.

Rawlings struggled to find work after leaving Neighbours, and launched his own entertainment business Trivial Fun and Games for clubs and hotels. He made guest appearances in Stingers and MDA in 2003. In 2019, Rawlings was working as a bingo caller at the Werribee Rotary Club.

== Personal life ==
Rawlings met his wife, model Lee Dowling, while he was performing at an opening ceremony for a chicken takeaway shop. He proposed after six weeks, and they married four months later in September 1984 on the Isle of Capri. Several of his Sons and Daughters co-stars were in attendance, along with his brother and Dowling's daughter from her marriage to Garry Dowling. Rawlings and Dowling also have one child together, a daughter.

== Filmography ==
Year	Title	Role	Notes
1982–1987	Sons and Daughters	Wayne Hamilton / Gary Evans	Series regular
1989	The Power, The Passion	Ryan McAlistor	Series regular
1990	Mission: Impossible	Gibbs	Episode: "Cargo Cult"
1992	Neighbours	Marcus Stone	Guest
1992–1999, 2005, 2022, 2023	Neighbours	Philip Martin	Series regular
1999	Night Fever	Contestant	Episode: "Millennium Eve Special"
2000	It's Anybody's Guess	Contestant	
2000	Blue Heelers	Matthew Quinn	Episode: "Life Class"
2003	Stingers	Tyrone Pattison	Episode: "New Blood"
2003	Blue Heelers	Dennis Morgan	Episode: "Every Man and His Ute"
2003	MDA	Paul Rees	Episode: "Bigger Fish to Fry"
2006	Temptation	Contestant	Episode: "Superchallenge: Heat 3"
2006	Where Are They Now?	Guest	
2017	Neighbours vs Time Travel	Philip	Webseries
