= List of Neighbours characters introduced in 1997 =

Neighbours is an Australian television soap opera created by Reg Watson. It was first broadcast on 18 March 1985. The following is a list of characters that first appeared in the serial in 1997, by order of first appearance. All characters were introduced by the show's executive producer Stanley Walsh. The 13th season of Neighbours began airing from 20 January 1997. Lisa Elliot was introduced in the same month. February saw the arrival of student Tim Buckley. Ben Atkins debuted in April, while Amy Greenwood made her first appearance in July. Matt Compton and Ben's sister Caitlin Atkins were introduced in September. November saw the first appearance of Paul McClain.

== Lisa Elliot ==
Lisa Elliot
- Neighbours character
- Portrayed by: Kate Straub
- First appearance: 27 January 1997
- Last appearance: 25 July 1997
- Introduced by: Stanley Walsh
In-universe information
- Occupation: Science teacher

Lisa Elliot, played by Kate Straub, made her first appearance on 27 January 1997. Straub was cast after being spotted in the audience of variety television show Hey Hey It's Saturday. Host Daryl Somers saw Struab and offered to set up a meeting with production company Grundys. Straub told Amanda Ruben of TV Week that she felt embarrassed by what had happened, but considered it the break into television that she needed having previously appeared in theatre productions. She continued: "This has been a lucky break which I see as a great challenge. I'm taking it very seriously because I'm determined to prove myself." Straub was contracted with the show until early 1997. She added that she was "an avid fan of Neighbours when Kylie and Jason were on, but I haven't watched much since. But my short time with the show has given me a huge appreciation of the television industry." Lisa is introduced as a new teacher at Erinsborough High. Straub said it was "a great part to have". Jason Herbison of Inside Soap noted that at 21, Straub was barely old enough to have achieved a teaching qualification in real life. Producers decided not to renew Straub's contract, and Herbison reported that her lack of training contributed to their decision.

Lisa moves to Erinsborough after she gets a job as a science teacher at the local high school. When Susan Kennedy (Jackie Woodburne) learns Lisa needs somewhere to stay, she tells her the residents of Number 30 Ramsay Street are looking for a new housemate and Lisa moves in. She gets on well with sisters Catherine O'Brien (Radha Mitchell) and Sarah Beaumont (Nicola Charles). Lisa is the target of several pranks by her students, including boot polish on her bike seat. Lisa and Sarah compete for the same man, and fall out when Lisa offers the spare room to Darren Stark (Todd MacDonald), who was involved in the breakdown of Catherine's relationship with Malcolm Kennedy (Benjamin McNair). They soon reconcile and invite Ben Atkins (Brett Cousins) to become their new housemate.

Lou Carpenter (Tom Oliver) persuades Lisa to coach the netball team. She becomes depressed when the team lose the final, but Sarah later diagnoses her with an over-active thyroid. Billy Kennedy (Jesse Spencer) becomes suspicious of Lisa's marking methods and writes an insulting sentence in his essay, which Lisa fails to notice. Billy proves that Lisa has not been reading the student's essays and Susan launches an investigation. Lisa quits her job, realising that she is not cut out for teaching. She later accepts a job in the research labs at a university in Tasmania. Before Lisa's leaving party, Ben overhears her talking about him on the phone and believes she has feelings for him. Ben kisses Lisa and she tells him that they might have had a chance of a relationship if she was not about to leave. After selling her belongings at a garage sale, Lisa says her goodbyes and leaves.

== Tim Buckley ==
Tim Buckley
- Neighbours character
- Portrayed by: Dean Francis
- First appearance: 27 February 1997
- Last appearance: 2 April 1997
- Introduced by: Stanley Walsh
In-universe information
- Occupation: Student

Tim Buckley, played by Dean Francis, made his first screen appearance on 27 February 1997. Tim was a high school student, who was a friend of Michael Martin (Troy Beckwith). He stayed with Michael's family on Ramsay Street. Tim was a shy boy, who was befriended by his school teacher Susan Kennedy (Jackie Woodburne). Tim developed a crush on Susan after she took him to the theatre. An Inside Soap reporter observed that it was clear Tim confused her friendly gestures for something more. They also noted that Tim became "a bit too dependent" on Susan's company. A few weeks later, Tim was unable to hold back his feelings for Susan and kissed her. Woodburne commented that to Tim it was not just a childish crush, saying "he truly think that he's in love with Susan. It's a very serious thing as far as he's concerned." Susan did not respond to the kiss, but Tim told her he was in love with her. Woodburne said Susan was not attracted to Tim, but felt an obligation to him, as it was affecting his studies. When Tim learned this, he became embarrassed and threatened to leave town.

Tim comes to stay with Michael Martin's family while he repeats Year 12. He tells Michael's sister, Hannah (Rebecca Ritters), that he had to drop out of school when his dad got sick. Tim is introduced to his teachers Susan Kennedy and Lisa Elliot (Kate Straub). He struggles to connect with anyone at school due to his age. Tim invites Susan to come to the theatre with him to see a play and she agrees. Tim later asks for her help with his history essay and she begins tutoring him. Toadfish Rebecchi (Ryan Moloney) takes Tim aside and tells him that he knows all about his crush on Susan and warns him to back off. Tim admits to Susan that he likes her, but wants to stop the rumours about him having a crush on her. When Susan searches out a book for Tim, she begins quoting from it and Tim kisses her. He later tells Susan that he loves her, but she lets him down gently. He sends her a love letter and Susan's husband, Karl (Alan Fletcher), confronts Tim. He leaves that same day, but Susan drives to his home and convinces him to return to Erinsborough for his schooling. However, Tim finds it hard being back and he returns home after saying goodbye to Susan.

== Ben Atkins ==
Ben Atkins (previously Christopher Wilkinson), played by Brett Cousins, made his first appearance on 9 April 1997. Cousins previously appeared in the show in a small guest role. He was surprised when he learned that he had won the role of Ben, saying "I could hardly believe it when they rang and said I had the part." A Daily Record reporter commented on Ben's arrival, saying "the girls at number 30 are bowled over by their new flatmate, Ben Atkins ... but he is harbouring a secret which has something to do with Ruth." It later emerged that Ben was actually Ruth Wilkinson's (Ailsa Piper) son. She had given birth to him when she was just 16 and kept it to herself. Ben's arrival won an AFI Award and Piper said the episode was "beautifully written", allowing her and Cousins to feed the characters and not just the plot.

== Amy Greenwood ==
Amy Greenwood, played by Jacinta Stapleton, made her first screen appearance on 10 July 1997. Stapleton had previously guested in a few television dramas, before being cast in the regular role of Amy. She called Neighbours "the best training ground" for herself. Amy was "fun-loving", "mischievous" and "sneaky". Stapleton said she shared some similarities to Amy, as they both liked to party and did not take things too seriously. Amy began a relationship with Lance Wilkinson (Andrew Bibby) shortly after meeting him. A reporter from The Age branded Amy "Ramsay Street's wild child turned party, fashion and gossip queen".

== Matt Compton ==
Matt Compton
- Neighbours character
- Portrayed by: Jonathon Kovac
- First appearance: 4 September 1997
- Last appearance: 16 October 1997
- Introduced by: Stanley Walsh
In-universe information
- Occupation: Police officer

Matt Compton, played by Jonathon Kovac, made his first screen appearance on 4 September 1997. Kovac was working at Melbourne's Crown Entertainment Complex when he saw and greeted the Neighbours casting agent. A couple of weeks later, his own agent informed him the casting agent wanted to see him. He was offered the role of Matt soon after and it marked his first acting role. Of his casting, Kovac commented "I was happy. Thrilled. It took a long time for it to sink in." Matt was introduced as a love interest for Sarah Beaumont, after actress Nicola Charles complained about a "lack of success" in her character's romantic life. Kovac found his first storyline "pretty nerve-racking", adding "It is hard enough just acting, let alone being thrown into a romance." Matt was also the first policeman to live on Ramsay Street. Jason Herbison of Inside Soap commented "Writers have always tried to avoid the long arm of the law, deeming it as a soap stereotype." Charles said there is an instant attraction between Sarah and Matt, and Sarah wants him to move into Number 30 as soon as she sees him. However, her housemate, Ben Atkins (Brett Cousins), is not so keen, as he does not want to live with a policeman. The pair had also agreed there would be no household relationships, so Matt and Sarah try to hide their attraction to one another, until it becomes too hard. Charles was pleased that her character had finally been given a love interest, but she did not want Sarah to settle into a long-term relationship. Sarah and Matt's romance marked Charles and Kovac's first on-screen love scenes. Kovac admitted that the kissing scenes were initially hard to do in front of the crew, but he praised Charles for helping him. An Inside Soap reporter branded the character "hunky".

Matt applies for the spare room at Number 30 Ramsay Street and is interviewed by Sarah Beaumont and Ben Atkins. When Ben learns Matt is a policeman, he worries about living with him, but Sarah informs Matt that he can move in. Matt pulls Ben over as his car is not registered and gives him a ticket. When he returns home, Matt apologises to Ben and invites him to the pub to play pool. While Ben is showing some school students around the garage, Matt notices that one of the engines does not have a serial number, resulting in tension between him and Ben, who thinks Matt is accusing him of stealing. Matt and Sarah share a kiss. Matt and Ben apologise to each other and Matt asks Sarah to the police graduation ball, which she agrees to go to as friends. They kiss again and start dating, but they initially hide their relationship from Ben. Matt and Ben eventually bond while working on Ben's new car. Matt is given a transfer to Port Campbell and asks Sarah to come with him. She turns the offer down and they agree to a long-distance relationship. Matt gives Sarah a friendship ring before he leaves and Ben throws him a farewell party. A few weeks later, Sarah and Matt end their relationship.

== Caitlin Atkins ==
Caitlin Atkins, played by Emily Milburn, made her first screen appearance on 29 September 1997. Milburn unsuccessfully auditioned for the role of Anne Wilkinson. She was cast as Caitlin six months later. Caitlin moved to Erinsborough to be with her adopted brother, Ben (Brett Cousins). She was described as being "wilful and manipulative" by Annette Dasey of Inside Soap. A reporter for the Illawarra Mercury observed, "Caitlin Atkins manages to stir up trouble in Ramsay Street, hiding her inner feelings under an air of tough bravado." Milburn did not share any similarities with Caitlin, but she found it was fun playing her. Caitlin was a competitive swimmer, who developed a romantic interest in her training partner Billy Kennedy (Jesse Spencer).

== Paul McClain ==
Paul McClain, played by Jansen Spencer, made his first screen appearance on 4 November 1997. Spencer auditioned for a small role on the show, but a month later he was told that he had secured a permanent role. Spencer was initially contracted for three months. Of joining the cast as a teen, Spencer commented "Getting a full time job at the age of fifteen or sixteen is a bit weird, because most kids are still at school or just working part time then. You can't really muck around too much on a show like Neighbours because everyone has a job to do." Spencer described Paul as being "a bit of a dag", but thought that as he got older he was becoming cooler. Paul was best friends with Tad Reeves (Jonathon Dutton) and dated Hannah Martin (Rebecca Ritters).

== Sondra Pike ==
Sondra Pike
- Neighbours character
- Portrayed by: Cathy Godbold
- First appearance: 10 November 1997
- Last appearance: 20 November 1997
- Introduced by: Stanley Walsh
In-universe information
- Brothers: Martin Pike

Sondra Pike, played by Cathy Godbold, made her first appearance on 10 November 1997. Godbold's casting was confirmed in the 4 October 1997 issue of TV Week. The month-long guest role marked Godbold's first television appearance in two years, following the cancellation of Newlyweds. She had been doing voice over work while attending auditions. Godbold was initially shocked after hearing a message from her agent telling that she had the role, before she ran around her flat screaming. She admitted that being cast in the show was "the best thing that's happened to me in a long time." Her character causes trouble after she is left in charge of a house that Darren Stark (Todd MacDonald) is renovating. Kelly Baker of TV Week called Sondra "a seductive young woman who sets her sights on Darren." Goldbold said her character would "wreak havoc", and described her as "the Heather Locklear of Ramsay Street" in reference to the actress's villainous character Amanda Woodward from Melrose Place.

Sondra meets with Darren Stark and introduces herself as Martin Pike's (Fletcher Humphrys) sister, who will be joining them on their house renovation. She explains that she has been taking an interior design course and her father wants her in charge. Darren asks if they can talk about her ideas for the house when he returns to work next week, but Sondra tells him that she wants him back tomorrow, as she does not believe he has a bad back. After Darren's girlfriend Libby Kennedy (Kym Valentine) leaves, Sondra asks him to attend her father's party with her or she will replace him on the renovation project. When Sondra comes to pick Darren up, Libby tells her that the only reason he is going is because Sondra forced him into it, but Sondra replies that Darren jumped at the chance. When they return, Sondra mentions that her father thought they would make a great couple, but Darren tells her that they only have a working relationship. Sondra later tells Libby that Darren is not her type, however, she soon makes it clear that she is romantically interested in him. She makes advances towards him while he is working on the house and he tries to put her off by pretending he wants to kiss her. Sondra hesitates and asks about Libby, but Darren says it is between them and she kisses him. Darren runs off and Sondra questions him about his behaviour. He explains that he was not really coming onto her, he just wanted her to stop flirting with him. Libby also tells Sondra to stop flirting with Darren, but she counters that Darren propositioned her. Sondra continues to pursue Darren, who tells her she has no chance. Days later, Sondra visits Darren to discuss some changes to the bathroom and he later brings Libby to work with him, so Sondra tries talking to her about interior design. Libby gets bored and leaves the site, leading Sondra to ask Darren why he wants to be with Libby and not her. She runs her hands over his body and he tries to fend her off just as Libby returns. Sondra later threatens Darren, but he and Libby dare her to ring her father. Instead she leaves and Libby admits that she feels sorry for her.

== Others ==
Date(s)	Character	Actor	Circumstances
22 January	Attendant	Brett Cousins	The attendant helps Billy Kennedy prepare for a bungee jump.
6–14 February	Claudia Harvey	Anne Phelan	Claudia befriends Harold Bishop, while he is suffering from amnesia. When Harold regains his memories and returns to Erinsborough, he invites Claudia to stay with him and his wife, Madge. Claudia and Madge do not get along, and Claudia attempts to leave as she does not feel welcome, but Harold insists that she stay. Claudia deliberately causes trouble to get Harold's attention, causing Madge to ask Harold if they can have some time alone. He then makes arrangements with some friends in Tasmania to look out for Claudia and sends her home.
20 February–4 March	Justin Black	Chris Ryan	Justin is Anne Wilkinson's ex-boyfriend. He competes with Billy Kennedy for Anne, which does not impress her. Anne and Justin share a kiss, but Justin eventually gives up and returns home.
7–22 April	Wayne Peterson	Andrew Wall	When Debbie Martin offers Darren Stark a job renovating the Coffee Shop, Darren asks his former cellmate Wayne to help. Wayne offers to get some stolen materials from a friend when Darren cannot pay his supplier, but later reveals that they have to rob a warehouse. Wayne begins dating Debbie and when she learns about his plan to rob the warehouse, she tells him to stay away from her. Wayne gets violent with Debbie but Darren warns him off and Lou Carpenter bars Wayne from the pub.
9 April 1997 – 7 December 2004	Dorothy Stevens	Jenny Seedsman	Dorothy manages the Pacific Bank and several Ramsay Street residents visit her for business loans. She also owns the Coffee Shop lease, which Malcolm Kennedy and Harold Bishop offer to buy from her. Dorothy also goes on dates with both Harold and Lou Carpenter. In 2004, Stuart Parker foils an armed robbery at the bank and Dorothy presents him with a cheque for $5000.
28 April–9 May	Rebecca Knotts	Charmaine Gorman	Rebecca dates Toadfish Rebecchi while she is visiting Erinsborough. They both lie about their age, but Rebecca eventually confesses that she is only 17 and still at school. Toadie continues to lie that he is older, but Billy Kennedy reveals that Toadie is still at school too. Rebecca forgives Toadie for lying and they part as friends.
2 May–9 July	Rohan Kendrick	Paul Zebrowski	Rohan is a blind man, who hires Libby Kennedy to help him around the house. Libby does not get along with Rohan, until she learns that he is lacking in confidence in himself. While out walking one day, Libby slips off a ledge and Rohan fetches help by himself. Libby and Rohan date, but Rohan ends the relationship when he realises Libby is not over her ex-boyfriend, Darren Stark.
20 June–10 July	Jamie-Lee Duggan	Josephine Clark	Runaway Jamie-Lee attempts to steal from Helen Daniels, but ends up befriending her. Jamie-Lee takes advantage of Helen's kind nature and she torches Lou Carpenter's mobile restaurant. Jamie-Lee is reunited with her parents and she confesses to torching the bus.
14 July 1997 –10 February 1998	Jacinta Myers	Caroline Morgan	When Amy Greenwood begins dating Lance Wilkinson, Jacinta refuses to accept him. When Lance humiliates Jacinta during class, she and Mitch get revenge by inserting a rude drawing of Susan Kennedy, drawn by Lance, into the school newsletter. Lance is suspended and struggles to prove that Jacinta was to blame. When Jacinta learns that Amy and Lance have broken up, she accepts Amy back into the group and reveals how she sabotaged the newsletter. Amy asks Jacinta to repeat the story and Toadfish Rebecchi films Jacinta from a tree. When Susan sees the tape, she suspends Jacinta for a week. During a swimming carnival, Jacinta taunts Anne Wilkinson about being a better swimmer than her. Anne swaps places with Caitlin Atkins, who easily beats Jacinta.
14 July–17 October	Mitch	Simon Adler	Mitch helps Jacinta Myers replace one of the pages in the school newsletter with a rude drawing of Susan Kennedy, to get Lance Wilkinson into trouble. Amy later invites Mitch and Cara Winfield to Lou Carpenter's house while Lance is babysitting, but their partying angers Lance and they fall out with Amy.
15 July 1997 –26 November 1998	Cara Winfield	Siho Ellsmore	Cara is Amy Greenwood and Jacinta Myers's friend. Amy invites Cara and Mitch to Lou Carpenter's house while Lance is babysitting, but their partying angers Lance and they fall out with Amy. After Lance is suspended for including a rude drawing of Susan Kennedy in the school newsletter, Cara admits that Jacinta had something to do with the incident. Cara later tells Mitch and Jacinta that Amy has broken up with Lance. Cara is injured during a muck-up day prank when Toadfish Rebecchi puts polystyrene balls in the air-conditioning system, causing dangerous gases to be pumped out.
18–20 July	Lloyd Hawkins	Denzil Howson	Lloyd meets with Marlene Kratz for a date. They bond over their shared love of Elvis Presley, but Lloyd soon becomes more interested in Debbie Martin after learning that she is running the Coffee Shop. He talks to her about his businesses and later comes to her house to continue their conversation. Lloyd visits Marlene to tell her about his plans for another business and wants her as a partner. Marlene eventually tells him that she just wants to be friends.
24 July–29 August	Tommy Roles	Tibor Gyapjas	Tommy is a friend of Darren Stark, who gives Harold Bishop tuba lessons. When Darren mentions that he knew Tommy from the prison, Harold assumes Tommy is a criminal, until Tommy explains that he was a chaplain. Tommy later advises Darren about a move to Byron Bay.
28 July 1997–23 April 2009	Bob	Bob; BJ; Ricky	After finding a stray Maltese, Sarah Beaumont names him Bob and takes him home. Bob destroys Sarah's roommate Richard Jones' ventriloquists dummy, is run over twice and dyed blue. When Sarah marries and leaves the country, she gives Bob to Toadfish Rebecchi and Joel Samuels. Bob goes missing and Toadie picks him up from the pound, but soon realises that he has brought home the wrong dog. Toadie spots Charlie Thorpe with Bob and they swap dogs. Bob and the Scully's dog, Harvey, go missing together and are put up for sale. Joel, Lou Carpenter and Stephanie Scully manage to get them back. Sarah eventually calls Toadie to ask that he sends Bob over to her, but Toadie sends her Bib, an identical dog as he has fallen in love with Bob. In 2008, Frazer Yeats hits Bob with his car and leaves him to be cared for by Steve Parker, the local vet. Bob is forced to move out of Number 30 when Daniel Fitzgerald says he is allergic to him. However, it turns out Dan is allergic to Bob's bed and he returns home. In 2009, Bob is diagnosed with cancer and is put to sleep. His ashes are scattered over the lake.
6–13 August	Richard Jones	Chris Fortuna	Richard moves into Number 30 with Sarah Beaumont and Ben Atkins. Sarah and Ben become worried when they hear Richard talking to himself in his room, but soon learn that he is practising his ventriloquism. Sarah's dog Bob does not like Richard's dummy and destroys it. A devastated Richard soon moves out.
11–26 August	Alistair O'Connor	Michael O'Neill	Alistair is an old school friend of Ruth Wilkinson. They meet up to discuss their lives and Alistair admits that he had a crush on Ruth. They go out to dinner and begin seeing more of each other. Alistair tries to impress Ruth and her children. He gives Lance Wilkinson some dating advice and introduces him to his daughter. Eventually, Ruth tells Alistair that she just wants to be friends.
21–26 August	Angela Quinton	Fiona MacGregor	Angela has a brief relationship with Ben Atkins after they meet in a club. Ben wants Angela to move into Number 30 with him, his housemate, Sarah Beaumont, puts her foot down as she does not want to live with a couple. Angela later reconciles with her ex-boyfriend.
25–26 August	Samantha O'Connor	Elise Hearst	Samantha is Alistair O'Connor's daughter. He introduces her to Lance Wilkinson and she develops a crush on him.
26 August 1997 – 5 February 1998	Jack Foster	Craig McMahon	Jack works as a lifeguard at the local swimming pool. Hannah Martin develops a crush on him and tries to catch his attention with the help of her friend Claire Girard. But after Claire gives Hannah a make-over, Jack asks Claire out instead. Claire tries again and succeeds in getting Jack to ask Hannah on a date, but then Jack learns Hannah is only 14. Jack is fired when he becomes distracted and Toadfish Rebecchi injures himself.
8 September–30 October	Claire Girard	Adele Schober	Claire is a French exchange student, who stays with Madge and Harold Bishop. Claire develops a crush on Billy Kennedy and befriends Hannah Martin. Claire and Hannah reignite the feud between the Ramsay and the Robinson families, by replacing the Ramsay Street sign with a Robinson Street one. Claire comforts Hannah when her grandmother, Helen Daniels dies and returns to France shortly after. The following year, Hannah goes to stay with her family.
26 September–3 November	Jimmy Drane	Peter Hardy	Jimmy is the track manager at Calder Park Raceway. Ben Atkins shows his car to Jimmy and he lets him have a drive on the track, as long as he does not race. Sarah Beaumont gets into another car with Jimmy and when he picks up speed, so does Ben. However, Ben skids off at a corner and Jimmy threatens to ban him from the raceway. He later drops off an application form for Ben's racing licence. Jimmy introduces Ben to his rival Steve Van Eck.
29 September 1997 – 2 February 1998	Mandi Rodgers	Sabina Lokic	When competitive swimmer Caitlin Atkins goes to the local pool to join the swim team, she befriends Mandi. Their coach Simon Butterworth realises that their friendship is beneficial to their training and encourages them to spend more time together. When Mandi's family move to Geelong, she is allowed to continue her training in Erinsborough, until she misses her train home one day and has to stay with Caitlin. That night, Mandi and Caitlin go to a club and Ben Atkins catches them coming home in the morning. When Mandi, Caitlin and Billy Kennedy go to Sydney for a swimming contest, Caitlin asks Mandi to lock her and Billy in the changing rooms. When Billy girlfriend, Anne Wilkinson, comes to see him, Mandi unlocks the door. She and Caitlin eventually drift apart.
30 September 1997 – 8 July 1998	Carol Maitland	Helen Trenos	Carol is a tax inspector who comes to help Lou Carpenter with his audit. While they are working, they realise that they have seen each other before at a dating agency. Lou asks Carol out to dinner and she accepts. A few months later, Carol visits Lou and apologises for not returning his calls. She admits that she was wary of starting a relationship with him, as he has a young daughter. However, she wants to be with him and they begin dating. The relationship ends when Carol realises that Lou is not over his former partner Cheryl Stark.
6–14 October	George Marshall	David Ravenswood	George meets Marlene Kratz at their local bowls club and they get on well. George asks Marlene to accompany him on a three-month world cruise and Marlene agrees.
9 October 1997–14 May 1998	Simon Butterworth	David Le Page	Simon coaches the local swim team. He encourages Caitlin Atkins and Mandi Rodgers to spend time together as their friendship is beneficial to their training times. He later takes the team to a contest in Sydney and puts Billy Kennedy in the relay race, after another swimmer is injured.
28 October 1997 – 4 August 1998	Tracey Cox	Margot Knight	Tracey is a social worker, who convinces Harold and Madge Bishop to foster Paul McClain. Tracey later returns to tell Paul that his father, Leo, wants to see him.
3 November 1997 – 19 January 1998	Steve Van Eck	Daniel Tobias	Steve is Ben Atkins's motor racing rival. Steve tells Ben that his car has a timing problem, but Ben disagrees. They race, but Steve easily beats Ben. The following day, Steve teases Ben about his engine and wins another race. Ben eventually beats Steve, but at their next race, Ben hits a stationary car and flips over before coming to a stop. The engine bursts into flames, but Ben is pulled to safety and put in an ambulance, as Steve watches on in shock.
3 November	Kay Winfield	Reiko Nagao	Kay is Cara Winfield's mother. When Cara is injured during a muck-up day prank executed by Toadfish Rebecchi, Kay takes her to Susan and Karl Kennedy's home to demand that he is punished.
21 November 1997–21 January 1998	Mike Burns	Daniel Jolles	Mike befriends Hannah Martin on the internet and eventually visits her in Erinsborough. Hannah's father, Philip, becomes suspicious and tries to contact Mike's parents. After he is reported missing on the news, Mike later reveals that his parents are on holiday and he told his grandmother he was staying with a friend. Mike is allowed to stay and he befriends Paul McClain, before he leaves.
24 November 1997, 17 November 1999–3 February 2000	Jeff Greenwood	Brad Flynn	Jeff is Amy Greenwood's brother and captain of the local cricket team. He invites Amy's boyfriend Lance Wilkinson to play cricket with him and his friend Johnny, but the game ends when Lance is injured. Stephanie Scully asks to join the team and Jeff tells her that no woman has ever played for them. When Steph proves to be capable of playing with the team and is selected, Jeff threatens to quit.
24 November 1997 – 27 February 1998	Johnny Winters	Shane Nicholson	Johnny is Jeff Greenwood's friend. He and Jeff play cricket with Lance Wilkinson, until Johnny bowls the ball and hits Lance in the face. Johnny later asks Jeff's sister, Amy, to the university ball and she accepts. Johnny then taunts Lance about the date.
