= Darren Stark =

- Neighbours character
- Todd MacDonald as Darren Stark (2008)
- Portrayed by: Scott Major (1993); Todd MacDonald (1996–2008)
- Duration: 1993, 1996–1998, 2004–2005, 2007–2008
- First appearance: 20 July 1993
- Last appearance: 30 January 2008
- Introduced by: Alan Coleman (1993); Bill Searle (1996); Ric Pellizerri (2004)
- Book appearances: Facing Tomorrow
- Scott Major as Darren Stark (1993)
In-universe information
- Other names: Freddo
- Occupation: Student; Handyman; Barman; Electrician
- Father: Maurie Stark
- Mother: Cheryl Stark
- Brothers: Brett Stark
- Sisters: Janine Stark; Danni Stark
- Half-sisters: Lolly Allen
- Grandfathers: Hector Kratz
- Grandmothers: Marlene Kratz
- Uncles: Patrick Kratz
- First cousins: Sam Kratz

Darren Stark is a fictional character from the Australian soap opera Neighbours, played by Todd MacDonald. He made his first on-screen appearance on 20 July 1993 and was originally played by Scott Major. When the character was released from prison in 1996, MacDonald took over the role and remained with the show until 1998. MacDonald has since returned twice for guest stints, plus a cameo appearance in the serial's twentieth anniversary episode.

== Casting ==
Scott Major, who would later appear in the serial as Lucas Fitzgerald, originated the role of Darren when the character appeared in a recurring capacity for three months in 1993. Producers decided to reintroduce the character in 1996. Thousands of actors auditioned for the role, including 19 year old Todd MacDonald. MacDonald's audition and the subsequent recalls were held in Sydney. He was then flown to Melbourne, where the actors were "whittled" down to five, before MacDonald was told he won the part. He then had to choose between Neighbours and the lead role in a touring production of Romeo and Juliet, which he had also successfully auditioned for. He choose Neighbours and said he was "thrilled" about being cast. He was contracted until May 1997, and admitted that he was worried about being typecast in a soap opera, so he only signed up for one year, but he later agreed to do a further six months. He commented "Then we'll renegotiate the contract. I guess they'll work out whether Darren goes back to jail or stays."

MacDonald felt the show gave him "valuable experience in front of the camera". But he found it difficult being in the public eye, and recounted a time when he was recognised at a cricket match and the crowd called out his character's name to him. He called it "one of the worst nights of my life." He explained that he started avoiding people and found it hard to take public transport, but added that "sometimes it's very warming to be recognised." After 20 months in the role, MacDonald left Neighbours and filmed his final scenes in late 1997. MacDonald told a TV Week reporter that he always planned to leave after around 18 months and was not going because of anything he liked or disliked about the show. He stated "This show has taught me a hell of a lot. I feel like I'm graduating again." MacDonald planned to look for TV, stage or film work and wanted to stay in Melbourne, where he had been based for Neighbours. MacDonald initially refused to reveal how his character departed the show, but said he was not being killed off and the door was open to a possible return. His exit scenes aired in April 1998.

== Development ==
Before he is sent to juvenile detention, Major described his version of Darren as "really aggressive and completely out for himself." Following the character's recast and return, Amanda Ruben of TV Week reported that his stint inside had transformed him, but his return to Erinsborough would not be "smooth sailing." MacDonald told her that Darren has come home and wants to "make good", but he has trouble with everyone's preconceived ideas of his character. MacDonald stated: "He's been on a prison farm and at a detention centre for three years, so he's picked up a few bad habits and isn't used to dealing with people in such an environment as Ramsay Street." MacDonald said the character's background, particularly his stint in prison for armed robbery, was what attracted him to the role and he felt that it was something he could "get my teeth into." Darren's presence on Ramsay Street causes "a stir" among its residents. Ruben also reported that Darren was set for a "sizzling" romance storyline with Libby Kennedy (Kym Valentine).

After a six year absence, MacDonald reprised the role in early 2004 for a ten-week guest stint. He revealed that he had been asked to return several times over the years, but prior commitments had prevented him from accepting. He said the timing was finally right and he was enjoying working with friends. He stated "Coming back was like going back in time, in a way. There are new faces now, but on particular days and with particular scenes, it's just like it was when I left." Darren returns to Erinsborough to try and reconcile with Libby. MacDonald said Darren never stopped loving Libby, explaining "The feeling is that he's gone away and is now on the straight road. And it's pretty clear from the start that he wants Libby back." In April 2005, Kris Green of Digital Spy revealed that MacDonald would be reprising his role to join many ex-cast members returning for the show's 20th anniversary episode. In November 2007, David Knox of TV Tonight reported MacDonald had returned to Neighbours once again.

MacDonald made his final appearance as Darren in January 2008. The character's final storyline began in December 2007, as he shares a kiss with Janae Timmins (Eliza Taylor-Cotter), which leads to the breakdown of his relationship with Libby. Janae's love rival Kirsten Gannon (Nikola Dubois) witnesses the kiss and threatens to tell Janae's partner Ned Parker (Dan O'Connor) because she is feeling vindictive. O'Connor commented that Janae was in "a bit of an emotional state when she kissed Darren. Darren was there and it happened, but now she feels terrible about it and doesn't wait long to tell Ned." Ned keeps the news from Libby, as she has recently been injured in a warehouse collapse. She leans on Darron for support, while he is convinced that she will not find out about the kiss. Valentine felt that Libby's feelings for Darren could never compare to those she had for her late husband Drew Kirk (Dan Paris), saying "I don't think she's ever really loved Darren the way she loved Drew." She thought Libby had put Drew on a pedestal and would not let anyone get as close to her again. After learning about the storyline, Valentine believed her character should not become hysterical or angry, as Darren has cheated on Libby three or four times at that point. She told TV Week's Jackie Brygel: "Darren has been this person since they were 18 years old. I think, at this point, Libby will have to go, 'You know what? See you later!' It's almost expected." When Libby eventually learns of the kiss, she ends the relationship with Darren.

== Storylines ==
=== 1993–1998 ===
Darren is first seen in a detention centre with Michael Martin (Troy Beckwith) and it is evident that there is a deep-seated enmity between the two. On his release, Darren heads to Erinsborough, where his mother Cheryl Stark (Caroline Gillmer) is living. Michael tries to warn his family about Darren but little does he know that Darren is working his way into his sister Debbie's (Marnie Reece-Wilmore) life by using his cellmate Freddo's (Luke Wright) name. Darren manages to manipulate Debbie by alienating her from her friends. Cheryl later rents Number 22 Ramsay Street (in order to get to know Lou Carpenter (Tom Oliver) and she and Darren move in, enabling him to get closer to Debbie.

Debbie's ex-boyfriend, Rick Alessi (Dan Falzon) is determined to get her away from Darren, but every attempt he makes backfires and seems to draw Debbie closer to Darren. Rick witnesses Darren kissing Louise Barker (Katrina McEwan) and tells Debbie who refuses to believe it. Rick learns Darren has a plan to drag Debbie into a robbery, so he helps break Michael out of the detention centre, disguised as a woman. Rick and Michael track Darren and Debbie down at a local service station where Darren pulls a knife on the cashier and Michael bursts in several seconds later and is shot by the cashier. Darren tries to flee but is arrested and subsequently jailed.

Three years later, Darren is paroled and returned to live with his mother and grandmother, Marlene Kratz (Moya O'Sullivan) in Ramsay Street. On his first day back in the area, he runs into Debbie, who is very cold with him. Darren struggles to find work and even contemplates breaking the law once again. He risks his life when he finds out some money is hidden in a derelict house and chooses to break in on the day of demolition. Darren manages to escape alive.

Libby Kennedy takes a shine to Darren and they become close much to ire of Libby's father Karl (Alan Fletcher). When Karl's surgery is firebombed and Darren happens to be in the area and is thrown off the bridge by the explosion, which is witnessed by Debbie, Darren is the prime suspect. It later emerges Gary Collins (John Powell) is the culprit, who had a grudge against Karl, who had been treating his son Pete (Sudi de Winter).

After the surgery episode, Darren's luck worsens when he is framed for stealing several CDs when a shoplifter thrusts them at him during a visit to the mall. Darren is re-imprisoned and this seems to enforce Karl's beliefs that he is trouble. Libby and Cheryl are convinced Darren is innocent. Darren temporarily breaks up with Libby as he doesn't want her waiting for him if he goes back to jail. Cheryl later finds a security tape exonerating her son. The couple reunite but Karl and Cheryl disagree with the relationship and things reach breaking point when Karl comes home one afternoon and learns that Darren has been in Libby's room and is convinced the couple have been having sex. After a massive argument between Karl, his wife Susan (Jackie Woodburne) and Cheryl, Darren and Libby temporarily move out. After several days in a bedsit, They decide to return home as it is detrimental to Libby's VCE exams. Cheryl is killed the day the couple return home when she tries to stop Darren's younger sister, Louise (Jiordan Anna Tolli) from running into the road. Darren and his sister Danni (Eliza Szonert) are devastated. After seeing Cheryl's body in the morgue Darren blames Karl, who was on hand to witness Cheryl's accident and attend to her. It is revealed Cheryl had been taking anti-depressant tablets which reacted with the morphine Karl had given her. An enquiry reveals Cheryl would have died of her injuries, regardless but it does not help Darren's mood.

When Darren's younger brother, Brett (Brett Blewitt) arrives home for Cheryl's funeral, Darren is cold with him. They later begin bonding but ultimately fall out over Libby, who Brett had befriended while Darren was in jail. Lou later returns to reconcile with Cheryl but is unaware that she had died when he arrives at Number 24 during her wake. Darren is incensed when he learns Lou is the beneficiary of Cheryl's estate and tries to fight it but ultimately gives in and moves next door with Marlene, Lou and Lolly. Darren also manages to repair things with Brett before he and Danni leave.

On Christmas Day 1996, Darren, Libby's brother, Malcolm (Benjamin McNair) and Karl renovate the pub previously owned by Cheryl. Malcolm suffers an accident which involves a plank crushing his trachea and Darren urges Karl to help him. Karl, who had given up medicine following Cheryl's death, manages to operate on Malcolm successfully and Darren's grudge abates when he realises Karl was not responsible for his mother's death.

After several weeks of ups and downs, Libby and Darren's relationship also seems to be back on track, but things change when Darren offers Malcolm's girlfriend, Catherine O'Brien (Radha Mitchell) driving lessons. After several arguments, Darren and Catherine realize they are attracted to each other and Darren cancels the lessons. Fate intervenes when Catherine's sister, Sarah Beaumont (Nicola Charles) asks Darren to put up a picture rail, leaving Darren and Catherine alone to give into their desires. Marlene catches them, but they are unaware. Catherine's guilt gets the best of her and she confesses all to Malcolm, who promptly punches Darren in the nose and disappears for the night, causing Karl to worry. Libby finds out second from Sarah and promptly dumps Darren. Darren tries to win her back but it fails when she spots Catherine at Number 22. Things aren't helped when Darren proposes and Libby rejects him. He decides to cut his losses and throw the engagement ring into Lassiter's Lake.

After Malcolm and Catherine reconcile and leave for London, Darren needs an extra person to help him run Handy Sam's – his and Malcolm's business formerly owned by Sam Kratz (Richard Grieve). Darren hires Wayne Peterson (Andrew Wall) to help him with the coffee shop renovations. Wayne tries to romance Debbie but it ultimately backfires one night when she rejects him and he gets aggressive, luckily Darren is on hand to warn him off. Darren and Debbie begin dating again despite their history. Their relationship is shaky as Libby is still in the picture albeit dating someone else, causing Debbie to become jealous. Darren and Debbie later agree on a mutual break-up

When a group of Ramsay Street residents go out to Dinner, the lift breaks down and Darren tries to investigate the problem by climbing through the hatch. The lift starts again and Darren is endangered until Libby manages to rescue him. Darren returns the favor and rescues Libby when she endangers herself while putting up a banner at Eden Hills University on the side of the building and is left hanging. Darren decides to leave Erinsborough and move to Byron Bay but Libby chases his bus down and convinces him to stay. Darren later scores a job working for Martin Pike (Fletcher Humphrys), a uni friend of Libby's. Martin's sister, Sondra (Cathy Godbold) tries to seduce Darren but he rejects her, risking the job and livelihood.

Darren faces temptation again in the form of Shannon Jones (Diana Glenn), a university friend of his housemate Toadfish Rebecchi (Ryan Moloney). Darren, Libby, Toadie and Shannon attend the uni ball. When Libby leaves after an argument with Darren, Shannon spots Darren outside and they kiss, which Darren later admits. Libby forgives him but it does not last very long after discovering video evidence of a second kiss between Darren and Shannon recorded by Paul McClain (Jansen Spencer) and Hannah Martin (Rebecca Ritters). Libby realises Darren can't be trusted and he leaves town but not before a lengthy chat.

=== 2004–2008 ===
Darren returns to Erinsborough, where he takes over Macauley's electrician business. Libby is shocked when he turns up to mend the faulty wiring at Number 28. Darren tells Libby that Brett has kept him informed of the events of her life, including her relationship and marriage to Drew Kirk (Dan Paris). Ben, Libby's toddler son takes a liking to Darren and she is impressed. After several weeks of tiptoeing around each other, Darren and Libby finally pick up where they left off six years earlier. Shortly after the wedding of Steph Scully (Carla Bonner) and Max Hoyland (Stephen Lovatt), Darren and Libby finally sleep together after taking things slow for a number of weeks. Karl still doesn't trust Darren, but Darren doesn't seem to care.

When Darren is accused of robbing Joe Scully's (Shane Connor) building site, it puts a strain on his relationship with Libby. Eventually the real culprits are revealed as Joe's son Jack (Jay Bunyan) and crooked police officer Olivia MacPherson (Sylvie de Crespigny) but Darren tells Libby that she will never completely trust him and leaves, despite her begging him to stay. He makes one last phone call to her before leaving an engagement ring in the telephone box. Several weeks later, Darren sends flowers to Libby and asks her and Ben to join him in Shepparton. Libby and Ben then leave to join him. The following year, Libby and Darren both appear in Annalise Hartman's (Kimberly Davies) documentary about Ramsay Street.

Two years later, Darren returns shortly after Libby arrives back in the area. It transpires that Darren was unfaithful while in Shepparton with their neighbour, Lynda Stephens (Nicola Wright). Libby eventually forgives Darren but true to form, Darren betrays her again by kissing Janae, who is going through some relationship problems with her boyfriend, Ned Parker (Daniel O'Connor). Kirsten, Ned's ex and the mother of his child Mickey (Fletcher O'Leary) witnesses this. Janae tells Ned, but Darren hides it from Libby, until Janae accidentally admits it aloud when music at a barbecue is turned off. Darren tells Libby and they break up and after saying a teary goodbye to Libby, Lou, Harold, and Ben he leaves Erinsborough again.

== Other appearances ==
In 2005, four novellas based on characters from Neighbours were released. The books were available to buy online and at some Australia Post outlets. Darren and Libby Kennedy were the focus of one of the books entitled Facing Tomorrow. It explains what happened after the couple left Erinsborough in 2004 and follows their new life together. Of the books, a spokeswoman said "It's different to what happens in the show; it's more like a fantasy of what happens, might have happened, in the show, they would take about an hour to read if you're a quick reader".

== Reception ==
While played by Major, Sharon Black of the Evening Herald called the character a "detention-centre trouble-maker". He was also branded a "bad guy" by Clare Horton of Huddersfield Daily Examiner, and a "bad boy" by a writer for British weekly magazine NOW. A reporter for the Gloucester Citizen quipped "When Darren Stark first showed up in Neighbours he came with a 'bad boy' tag firmly attached."
