= List of Neighbours characters introduced in 1999 =

Neighbours is an Australian television soap opera created by Reg Watson. It was first broadcast on 18 March 1985. The following is a list of characters that first appeared in the serial in 1999, by order of first appearance. All characters were introduced by the show's then executive producer Stanley Walsh. The 15th season of Neighbours began airing from 18 January 1999. Bess O'Brien, the mother of established character Sarah Beaumont, was introduced in February. May saw the arrival of Peter Hannay, while Martin Chester began appearing from July. Daniel Fitzgerald, Teabag Teasdale and Teresa Bell arrived in September. Charlie Thorpe debuted in October, along with the five-strong Scully family consisting of parents Joe and Lyn, and their daughters Stephanie, Felicity and Michelle.

== Bess O'Brien ==
Bess O'Brien
- Neighbours character
- Portrayed by: Diana McLean
- First appearance: 8 February 1999
- Last appearance: 10 March 1999
- Introduced by: Stanley Walsh
In-universe information
- Occupation: Environmental activist
- Daughters: Catherine O'Brien; Sarah Beaumont
- Grandsons: Angus Beaumont-Hannay
- Granddaughters: Antigone Hannay; Susannah Kennedy

Bess O'Brien, played by Diana McLean, made her first screen appearance on 8 February 1999. McLean was happy to take on the role of Bess and said the cast and crew made her feel welcomed on set. Bess is Sarah Beaumont's (Nicola Charles) mother. She came to Erinsborough to visit her daughter, but their reunion was not entirely happy, as they had some issues to deal with first. McLean explained, "Bess is a highly dedicated environmental campaigner. Over the years she has spent more of her time fighting for various causes than she has bringing up her own daughter." McLean said it was not easy for Bess to make things up with Sarah, but Bess was "a determined lady." Realising that Sarah had been through some tough times, Bess wanted to be there for her.

Bess comes to Erinsborough to give a talk and to see her daughter, Sarah. Bess tells Sarah's friends that she had named her daughter Chakira Sunshine, while her sister Catherine (Radha Mitchell) was named Chandra Rain. They had both changed their names when they started school. Bess stay with Sarah, who confides in her about her bad year, which culminated in her dismissal from her job at the hospital. Bess speaks to the director of nursing at the Hospital and gets Sarah's appeal brought forward. Bess befriends Susan Kennedy (Jackie Woodburne) and learns that Sarah had an affair with Susan's husband. Sarah becomes frustrated with her mother and when Bess suggests that maybe she should get a job with Greenpeace. A furious Sarah tells Bess that she wants to help people. She then admits how angry she and Catherine were at Bess for never being there for them while they were growing up. Bess cooks dinner for Sarah as a peace offering, and Sarah forgives her.

Bess and Sarah go to the country together to visit some of Bess's friends. Back in Erinsborough, Bess receives a call asking her to attend a conference in New Zealand. Realising that her daughter needs her, Bess decides to stay with her. Bess helps Sarah raise money for a hospital fundraiser and helps Sarah's housemate Joel Samuels (Daniel MacPherson) get his job back. Bess is grateful that she has mended the rift between her and Sarah and she leaves for home. A few months later, Bess sends her friend Peter Hannay (Nick Carrafa) to visit Sarah and they become engaged. Bess fails to make it to the wedding after missing her flight.

== Peter Hannay ==
Peter Hannay
- Neighbours character
- Portrayed by: Nick Carrafa
- Duration: 1999, 2016
- First appearance: 17 May 1999
- Last appearance: 30 November 2016
- Introduced by: Stanley Walsh (1999); Jason Herbison (2016)
In-universe information
- Occupation: Doctor
- Wife: Sarah Beaumont (1999–2003)
- Sons: Angus Beaumont-Hannay
- Daughters: Antigone Beaumont-Hannay

Peter Hannay, played by Nick Carrafa, made his first appearance on 17 May 1999. Carrafa was contracted for a twelve-week guest stint. He previously appeared in Neighbours as Tony Romeo in 1987 and is married to Fiona Corke, who played Gail Robinson. He told Belinda Young of TV Week that he had been "an occasional Neighbours watcher" and joked that when he was younger, Gail was his favourite character. Peter is introduced as a love interest for Sarah Beaumont (Nicola Charles) and helped facilitate her exit from the serial. Carrafa explained that Peter knows Sarah's mother and when he mentions that he is going to be spending time in Erinsborough, she tells him to visit her daughter. Of Peter and Sarah's first meeting, he said "The mother is a bit of a hippy, so Sarah is expecting my character to be a hippy... and I am expecting her to be a hippy, too. We are both relieved when we discover we're not, so go to a restaurant, have a good time and talk about our childhoods and the things we have in common, because I'm a doctor and she's a medical receptionist. The relationship goes from there."

Following a "whirlwind romance", Peter and Sarah get engaged. Ahead of the proposal, Sarah and Peter declare their love for one another and Peter decides to stay on in Erinsborough. He then "whisks" Sarah away on a camping trip, where he proposes and she accepts. Peter later presents her with a $40,000 engagement ring, which is coincidentally similar to Susan Kennedy's (Jackie Woodburne). Sarah initially has reservations about marrying Peter, as she still has feelings for Susan's husband Karl Kennedy (Alan Fletcher). During the episode broadcast on 13 July 1999, a "lovestruck" Peter and Sarah exchange vows and marry a month. Peter almost catches Sarah sharing a goodbye kiss with Karl, before they depart for their new life overseas. This marked the departure of both characters. A writer for Inside Soap called Peter "dashing" and "hunky". Another columnist hoped Peter was the one doctor to "finally mend Sarah's broken heart."

When Charles returned to Neighbours in 2013, she revealed that Sarah and Peter had two children and had since separated. Carrafa briefly reprised the role for "a surprise return" in November 2016. Peter returns to Erinsborough to collect his son Angus Beaumont-Hannay (Jai Waetford) and escort him to Sydney. Angus is angry with Peter for not caring that he went missing on the Gold Coast. Peter apologises for not being there for him and they reconcile. Peter thanks Karl and Susan for taking care of Angus. He tells Karl that he will be based in Sydney for the foreseeable future, as he has a job with the Flying Doctors.

== Martin Chester ==
Martin Chester
- Neighbours character
- Portrayed by: Gil Tucker
- First appearance: 29 July 1999
- Last appearance: 2 September 1999
- Introduced by: Stanley Walsh
In-universe information
- Occupation: Doctor
- Wife: Trish

Martin Chester, played by Gil Tucker, made his first screen appearance on 29 July 1999. Martin was an old friend of Karl (Alan Fletcher) and Susan Kennedy (Jackie Woodburne). After he arrived in town, he took Susan out to dinner. While Karl was aware that his friend and his wife were out to dinner, he did not think Susan would be capable of cheating on him. Woodburne explained, "Susan is very attracted to Martin, but she wouldn't be aware of it if her marriage was more solid and she wasn't feeling so unloved." Woodburne added that Susan was attempted to have an affair with Martin, but she ultimately wanted her marriage to survive. Woodburne was good friends with Tucker before his Neighbours appearance, having appeared with him in Cop Shop thirteen years previously. She thought their friendship made it easier to play ex-lovers on-screen.

Martin is an old university friend of Karl and Susan Kennedy. Martin had been a member of Karl's band The Right Prescription and had dated briefly dated Susan. When Martin comes to Erinsborough as part of his job, he comes into contact with Susan and they grow close. Martin explains that he has recently split up from his wife, while Susan was recovering from Karl's affair. After spending a few evenings together, and with Karl away, Martin admits to Susan that he is in love with her. Karl is pleased to see Martin and insists on taking him out to lunch, so they can catch up. Martin and Susan meet up in secret to talk about things. They are spotted by Tad Reeves (Jonathon Dutton) and Susan realises that it would look bad to Karl if he found out. When Karl suggests reforming The Right Prescription, Martin tells him he is leaving for Alice Springs. Susan later admits to Karl that she was tempted to have an affair with Martin.

== Daniel Fitzgerald ==
Daniel "Dan" Fitzgerald, played by Brett Tucker, made his first screen appearance on 1 September 1999. Tucker played the role of high school teacher Dan for a brief period. His major story arc was a romance with his housemate Tess Bell (Krista Vendy). Tess had a crush on Dan, but was heartbroken when he dated Steph Scully (Carla Bonner). When Tess eventually told Dan about her crush, he admitted that he liked her too, but did not want to pursue his feelings as she was married. Dan later moved out to give their relationship a chance. Vendy was unsure if the storyline would continue as Tucker was not a regular cast member. Tucker reprised his role in 2007, when Neighbours shifted its focus back to character driven storylines and family values. Dan took on a counselling role at the high school. Michael Lallo from The Age said Tucker raised "the hunk quotient" as Dan.

== Teabag Teasdale ==
Teabag Teasdale
- Neighbours character
- Portrayed by: Nathan Phillips
- First appearance: 3 September 1999
- Last appearance: 19 October 1999
- Introduced by: Stanley Walsh
In-universe information
- Occupation: Student

John "Teabag" Teasdale, played by Nathan Phillips, made his first screen appearance on 3 September 1999. Phillips made his acting debut on Neighbours. He was a drama student at the time of his casting, and had only just decided to become an actor. His character was meant to have one line, but he was later given a two-month contract. Sacha Molitorisz from The Sydney Morning Herald thought Teabag was "unlikely". Tony Johnston, author of Neighbours: 20 years of Ramsay Street, wrote that Teabag was, for a time, the show's "resident bad boy" and that he was "nothing but trouble". Phillips later said that he still gets recognised for his role as Teabag.

John Teasdale or Teabag, befriends Hannah Martin (Rebecca Ritters), Paul McClain (Jansen Spencer) and Tad Reeves (Jonathon Dutton) after they turn a local allotment into a BMX track. Tad tells Teabag that he is going to make a film about BMXing and Teabag agrees to help. He throws a brick through the window of Grease Monkeys as part of the opening shot, and he and the others have to run when the police turn up. Teabag is impressed by Hannah when he sees her performing some BMX moves. He gives her his old BMX bike as a gift and they grow closer. When Hannah learns that her family are planning to move away, she becomes desperate to find somewhere to stay in Erinsborough. Teabag offers her a place at his share house. Paul is not happy with Hannah's growing relationship with Teabag and he confronts him, which leads to Teabag punching Paul.

Teabag brags about committing several local robberies and he later admits to Hannah that he broke into Billy Kennedy's (Jesse Spencer) workshop. Hannah, Paul and Tad tell Billy the truth and he reports Teabag to the police. Realising that Teabag is not the guy she thought he was, she decides to move away with her family. Teabag learns that Paul and Tad told Billy about the robbery and he makes their lives difficult by harassing them. He also admits to Hannah that the bike he gave her was stolen. Teabag continues to harass the Bishops by sitting in the Coffee Shop playing loud music and not ordering anything. He also phones in a fake order for food and cancels it once it is prepared. He also has a large number of pizzas sent to the Bishop house. Paul and Tad decide to get their own back by pulling apart Teabag's bike. Teabag goads them into returning to his house and Paul and Tad throws things at it. When Tad smashes one of the windows, a police car arrives and Teabag is pleased to get one over on them. Paul and Tad decide to stop trying to get even with Teabag. On Hannah's last day at school, Teabag gives her a bracelet and he gives up harassing the Bishops.

== Teresa Bell ==
Teresa "Tess" Bell, played by Krista Vendy, made her first screen appearance on 17 September 1999. Vendy secured her audition for Neighbours through her agency. She auditioned three times in total and was one of three actresses up for the role. The actress learned that she had won the part of Teresa, or Tess, six months later. Tess was originally a barmaid called Tamsin Flynn, but after Vendy won the role, the producers decided to change the character's name and occupation. At the time of her introduction, Tess was a 24-year-old, married English teacher, who decided to move to Erinsborough to regain her independence. She found employment at the local high school. Despite being married, Tess developed a crush on her housemate Daniel Fitzgerald (Brett Tucker). Gina Leros of The Sun-Herald said Vendy would be the one to watch in Neighbours throughout 2000.

== Charlie Thorpe ==
Charlie Thorpe
- Neighbours character
- Portrayed by: Katrina Baylis
- First appearance: 8 October 1999
- Last appearance: 15 November 1999
- Introduced by: Stanley Walsh

Charlie Thorpe, played by Katrina Baylis, made her first screen appearance on 8 October 1999. Following a "whirlwind romance" with fellow student Toadfish Rebecchi (Ryan Moloney), Charlie asked him to marry her. Moloney said Toadie was shocked by the proposal, and while he believed it was too soon, he accepted. Moloney believed that one of the reasons Toadie fell for Charlie was that he was on the rebound. He added that Toadie had never met someone like Charlie before and the more she pursued him, the more Toadie fell in love with her. Baylis said that Charlie was just using Toadie, as her work visa was running out. Of her character, the actress commented "You never know what to expect from Charlie. She's sweet and fun-loving one minute, then cold and calculating the next."

After Toadfish Rebecchi loses his dog, Bob, he goes to the local pound, but comes away with the wrong dog. He eventually comes across a woman in the park walking a similar looking dog to Bob. She explains that the dog is called Fluff, and belongs to her flatmate. After checking the dog, Toadie realises that it is Bob and the two dogs are exchanged back. Toadie then has a coffee with the woman, who introduces herself as Charlie. Toadie later spots Charlie at the university, and she tells him that she is from London and is studying law in Australia. Charlie tells Toadie about her ex-boyfriend, Rupert (Craig Blumeris), who she is still sharing a house with. Charlie later shows up at Toadie's house and tells him that Rupert refuses to move out. Charlie asks Toadie if she can stay with him and he agrees. When Toadie tries to kiss her, Charlie pulls away, making it clear that she is not ready. Charlie realises Toadie's housemate, Joel (Daniel MacPherson), is not happy with her staying, and she leaves.

Charlie later apologises for her behaviour and offers to cook for Toadie at his house. Joel becomes suspicious of Charlie, and he and Lance Wilkinson (Andrew Bibby) fall out with Toadie, when he invites Charlie to move in. When Charlie turns up with her stuff, Joel and Lance explain that she cannot move in. Charlie then goes to Toadie and claims that Joel and Lance had been rude to her, worsening the rift between them. Toadie and Charlie find a flat together, and Charlie later proposes to him. Toadie takes some time to think about it and then proposes to Charlie himself. Charlie later subtly drops her visa problems into the conversation and Toadie realises that she wants to marry him to stay in the country. Rupert also warns Toadie that he is making a mistake and shows Toadie a love letter from Charlie. Toadie confronts her and he learns that Charlie is not a student at the university and that she does not love him. Charlie then walks out of Toadie's life forever.

== Joe Scully ==
Joe Scully, played by Shane Connor, made his first screen appearance on 20 October 1999. Connor was invited to audition for the role of Joe by the show's producers. Connor decided to accept when he learned that there was a chance he work with Janet Andrewartha, who played Joe's wife Lyn. The character also offered Connor a chance to play someone other than a bad guy or "a man on the verge." Connor was contracted with Neighbours for three years, with 12-month options. Joe was a builder and Connor said, "He's the only one who isn't so easy to get along with. Well, he is, as long as you don't get on the wrong side of him. He doesn't really care what people think." Andrew Mercado, author of Super Aussie Soaps, described Joe as being a "permanently missing-in-action" character.

== Lyn Scully ==
Lynette "Lyn" Scully, played by Janet Andrewartha, made her first screen appearance on 20 October 1999. Andrewartha asked her agent to find her a role that would keep her in Melbourne, so she could be with her children. Six months later, Andrewartha's agent suggested she try out for Neighbours, and Andrewartha talked to producers, did a screen test and was offered the role of Lyn. The actress said her character did not feel good enough for Erinsborough and tried hard to fit in. This caused some conflict between Lyn and her husband, Joe (Shane Connor). Guy Davis from The Newcastle Herald observed Lyn's "vulnerability and messiness" resonated with viewers. The actress added "She's imperfect but she keeps trying. Marriages break up, businesses fall over, this happens, that happens, but Lyn keeps pulling her socks up and giving it another go."

== Stephanie Scully ==
Stephanie Jo "Steph" Scully, played by Carla Bonner, made her first screen appearance on 20 October 1999. Before Bonner was cast in the role, actress Emma Roche was initially contracted to play Stephanie. However, Roche unexpectedly quit the role after three weeks. Bonner auditioned twice, before landing the part. Reporters for eBroadcast wrote that Steph was the eldest of the Scully siblings, and she preferred leathers and motorbikes to the hobbies of her friends. Steph was a tomboy and a "straight shooter". She had plenty of male admirers upon her arrival and she quickly became best friends with Libby Kennedy (Kym Valentine). In June 2002, Steph came first in a poll run by Newsround to find viewers' favourite Neighbours character. She received 34.85% of the vote. Steph was voted viewers favourite Neighbours character in a survey carried out by website Yahoo! in 2010.

== Felicity Scully ==
Felicity Jane "Flick" Scully, played by Holly Valance, made her first screen appearance on 20 October 1999. Valance did not have much experience auditioning prior to Neighbours. She learned that she had won the part of Felicity three months later. Of her reaction to finding out she had the part, Valance said "I never would have [believed it]. You know the show that I've been watching since I was two years old and been such a huge fan. Not in a million years would I thought I would be a part of." Neighbours was Valance's first major television role. She was sixteen when she was cast as Felicity, one year older than her character. Felicity was "a devoted feminist" and someone who had a "very active social conscience." For her portrayal of Felicity, Valance was nominated for the Most Popular New Female Talent Logie Award in 2000.

== Michelle Scully ==
Michelle Scully, played by Kate Keltie, made her first screen appearance on 20 October 1999. Keltie was thirteen when she was cast as the youngest Scully sibling Michelle. She was a year older than the character she portrayed. Reporters for eBroadcast said Michelle had "an over-active imagination." While Keltie branded Michelle a spoilt little princess, who looked like butter would not melt. Keltie told Alison James of Soaplife, "She's actually wild and thinks she can get away with anything. She also has a mad imagination which means she tells very convincing fibs." Michelle was close to her father and, a writer for the BBC's Neighbours website observed that she was "very mature, very clever, and very determined." Shortly after her arrival, Michelle developed a crush on neighbour Paul McClain (Jansen Spencer).

== Others ==
Date(s)	Character	Actor	Circumstances
19 January–6 May	Jade Cleary	Talia Krape	Jade takes an interest in Paul McClain, while his girlfriend Hannah Martin is away.
19 January–3 February	Gary O'Neil	Kevin Hopkins	Gary comes to Ramsay Street to see Anne Wilkinson. He tells Anne that he is Lily Madigan's great nephew and that he missed her funeral, as he did not know about it. He initially claims that he does not want to fight over her house, that she has left to Anne, but he takes the case to court. Anne wins and she decides to rent the house out.
19 January–9 March	George Caruana	Greg Ross	George is a radio DJ who begins working at Eden Hills' station, Uni FM and immediately riles Susan Kennedy when he claims that the local high school is failing its students. He causes problems when he tries to lean on Joel Samuels for the story about his accident and threatens to make up a story when Joel refuses. Toadfish Rebecchi challenges George verbally on air and all the listeners hear. After a controversial comment about Adolf Hitler, the station manager, Tony Simpson, has George removed from air.
26 January	Brenda Samuels	Pixie Jones	Brenda is Joel Samuels's mother. She arrives in Erinsborough from Tasmania after reading about her son's accident in a local newspaper. Brenda fusses over Joel much to his discomfort and it becomes evident that things between them are strained as Brenda never approved of Joel pursuing athletics. She upsets Anne Wilkinson who was responsible for Joel's accident, but apologises when Joel tells her to stop fussing. After seeing how much support Joel has in the community, Brenda returns home.
29 January–16 February	Andy Sisson	Martin Copping	Andy is a homeless busker who Harold Bishop and Karl Kennedy meet while doing voluntary work for the Salvation army. Andy is annoyed when Karl suspects him of buying drugs and later steals one of his prescription pads. After Karl punches Stevie Wells, who protects Andy's busking spot on the streets, Andy declines to be seen with Karl.
3–26 February 2001	Cluney Webb	Cecilia Specht	Cluney is a physiotherapist at Erinsborough Hospital who attends to Joel Samuels after his knee injury, and assists with his rehab. Several years later, she tends to Lou Carpenter when he suffers back problems.
24 February–26 October	Allie Bentley	Jade Butler	Allie is Hannah Martin's friend, who takes an interest in Tad Reeves and later Paul McClain.
10–18 March	Alita Zagarnauskas	Annabel Mounsey	Alita is a friend of Ruth Wilkinson who applies for the position of Vice-Principal at Erinsborough High. Alita is shortlisted but when Susan Kennedy discovers Alita is a friend of Ruth's, she is annoyed and Ruth worries that a conflict of interest may have jeopardised Alita's chances. In spite of this, Alita is given the job much to Ruth's relief.
24 March–20 July	Jemma Acton	Jessica Gower	Jemma is a classmate of Lance Wilkinson at Eden Hills University. Lance shows an interest in Jemma but she is more interested in Joel Samuels and they begin casually dating. Jemma hosts the "Single and Suffering" Ball at the university and crowns Lance and his date, ex-girlfriend Amy Greenwood King and Queen, much to their awkwardness.
31 March–28 June	Vincenzo Coletti	Tasos Petousis	Vincezo hires Anne Wilkinson to work as a waitress for his restaurant. After a disastrous first evening where Anne is slow and ends up spilling wine on a customer, Vincenzo sends Anne to do a waitressing course after she admits her references were embellished. At the end of one shift, Vincenzo kisses Anne on the cheek, which is witnessed by her boyfriend, Billy Kennedy. Bill is jealous at first, but thinks nothing of it.
31 March 1999 – 14 March 2000	Damien Smith	John Ridley	Damien works for the same airline as Amy Greenwood and they begin a relationship. However, when Amy begins to exaggerate the details of the relationship to the point she tells her friends that Damien has asked her to move in with him, he breaks up with her. Amy and Damien get back together just before the new year, while Amy has supposedly reconciled with Lance Wilkinson. Amy soon falls pregnant and is forced to admit to Lance's sister, Anne that the baby is Damien's. Lance tells Damien the truth and he proposes to Amy, who rejects it at first, but then accepts. Damien and Amy then marry in Fiji and Amy gives birth to their son, Jax. When Amy returns to Erinsborough twenty years later, she reveals to Toadie Rebecchi that she and Damien have divorced due to Damien's homosexuality.
8 April–12 July 2001	Frances Nagel	Judith Roberts	Frances is a librarian at Eden University, who takes a liking to Harold Bishop when he returns a long overdue book. She is disappointed when she learns he is married, but she begins spending a lot of time with Harold and offers to cook for him, but he turns her down. Frances admits that she has been lonely since the death of her husband five years earlier and her daughter lives interstate. Following the death of Harold's wife, Madge, Frances reappears in Harold's life and they resume their friendship, however, Harold's foster son, Paul McClain finds Frances' presence uncomfortable and Harold stops seeing her.
18 May–16 September 2002	Ron Kirk	John Orcsik	Rose and Ron are Drew Kirk's parents, who live in Oakey.
18 May–20 March 2001	Rose Kirk	Diana Greentree	Rose and Ron are Drew Kirk's parents, who live in Oakey.
18 May–16 September 2002, 7 March 2018	Dougal Kirk	Michael Barallon; Steven Bahnsen; Brandon Burns	Dougal is Drew Kirk's younger brother. He is initially hostile towards Drew when he returns home as Drew promised to come back home to Oakey for good, but Drew is able to smooth things over by suggesting Dougal comes to Erinsborough in the next school holidays. Dougal tries to stow away in Drew's car on his return to Erinsborough, but is foiled. Dougal later attends Drew's wedding to Libby Kennedy and also runs away to live with them, but is returned to Oakey. Dougal is happy when Drew and Libby agree to move to Oakey, but Drew dies after falling off a horse and Dougal attends his funeral. Years later, Stephanie Scully and Drew's son Ben Kirk visit Dougal's garage in Oakey. Dougal tells them he is busy and avoids spending time with Ben. Steph confronts him and Dougal explains that he can see too much of Drew in Ben. He also admits to feeling guilty about Drew's death, but Steph tells him he was not at fault. Dougal apologises to Ben and they spend the rest of the day together at Dougal's garage. Dougal later offers Ben a job as an apprentice after seeing how skilled he is.
24 May	Ruby Hanson	Leyden Brewer	Ruby is the newborn daughter of Ray and Shelley Hanson. Shelley goes into labour with Ruby at a Rodeo Ball in Oakey. The Hansons' friends Libby Kennedy and Drew Kirk visit Ruby at Oakey Hospital the following morning.
7 June–11 November	Barry Reeves	Fred Barker	Barry is Tad Reeves's father. He arrives to tell Tad that he and Tad's mother, Coral, are separating and that Tad will remain in Erinsborough. He returns several months later to tell Tad that he is adopted, which upsets him. However, before Barry leaves he tells Tad he and Coral will always love him.
10 June–6 July	Chloris Mott	Lise Rodgers	Chloris is a bridal shop assistant. She serves Sarah Beaumont and Amy Greenwood when they look for a dress for Sarah's wedding. When they learn that the dress Sarah wants costs $3,800, Amy devises a plan to copy it and has Toadfish Rebecchi distract Chloris with wedding talk while she takes a photo of the dress. However, Chloris catches them and confiscates the film telling them a copy will never look as good as the real thing. Several weeks later, Sarah and Amy come back for the dress, but it has been sold. However, Chloris sells them a similar one.
17 June–24 February 2000	Julia Burrows	Rhian Skirving; Ruth Callum	Julia meets Lance Wilkinson on a fruit-picking trip in Mildura and she later arrives in Erinsborough at a seminar at Eden University. Julia and Lance begin dating, making Lance's ex-girlfriend, Amy Greenwood jealous. Several months later, Lance arrives to see Julia after his reconciliation with Amy fails. Julia realises that Lance is on the rebound and rejects his advances and he returns to Erinsborough alone.
23 June–24 September	Becky Niedermyer	Diane Viduka	Becky is a Year 12 girl who Tad Reeves tries to impress by organising a concert at a local hall featuring a band named The Dogs, but things fall apart when the speakers short out as soon as the band play.
24 June–3 August	Megan Townsend	Allison Byrne	Megan meets Lance Wilkinson at a nightclub and gives him her number on a slip of paper, which he accidentally washes in his trousers, prompting his friends to think he is making her up. They meet again in the university library and go on a date. Lance's ex-girlfriend, Amy Greenwood finally believes him when she sees them together. When Amy appears on another one of Lance and Megan's dates, Lance accuses her of stalking them. Amy suspects Megan of using Lance and her suspicions are confirmed when she overhears Megan and her friend, Rachel Ball, talking in the toilets and learns that Megan only dated Lance to win a bet. Amy tells Lance and he confronts Megan who admits to the bet. She also admits that she genuinely likes him, but he breaks up with her.
24 June–6 April 2000	Gordon Collins	Chris Waters	Gordon is a client of Philip Martin. His manner and general attitude annoy Philip's wife, Ruth, especially when he takes up a lot of Philip's time. Gordon nominates Philip to join an exclusive club in Eden Hills. Philip brings Lou Carpenter to the club as his guest, but Gordon can see Lou's desperation to join and is unimpressed. He later ends his association with Philip after he learns Philip is indirectly responsible for Lou's tax problems. Several months later Gordon and Lou make a $1000 bet on a local cricket game, which Lou wins.
9 July–17 January 2000	Kate Johns	Fiona Harris	Kate is a nurse at Erinsborough Hospital and a friend of Sarah Beaumont. She attends Sarah's hen party and tends to Drew Kirk after he is admitted with burns following a fire on Millennium eve.
12–13 July	Trent Rushworth	Christopher Lee	Trent is a friend of Peter Hannay. He arrives for Peter's wedding to Sarah Beaumont and serves as best man.
20–27 July	Rachel Ball	Pip Sallabank	Rachel is a student at Eden Hills University and a friend of Megan Townsend. They laugh about classmate Lance Wilkinson. Amy Greenwood, Lance's ex-girlfriend overhears a conversation between Rachel and Megan about dating Lance for a bet and witnesses Rachel paying Megan $10.
9 August–10 November	David "Fanto" Hodges	Daniel Dinnen	David, nicknamed Fanto due to his love of Phantom comics, is an art student at Eden University, who takes an interest in Anne Wilkinson. Anne is flattered, but as she has recently broken up with Billy Kennedy, just wants to be friends. She and Fanto bond over painting. Their relationship moves up a gear and Fanto and Anne decide to live as artists in a warehouse. During a meal with Anne's brother Lance and his girlfriend Amy Greenwood, Fanto sees them as shallow and suggests Anne no longer associate with them. Fanto then tries to proposition Amy to pose nude for him, but she is disgusted and refuses. He then tells Anne his side of the story. Anne soon discovers Fanto has been taking $50 rent from everyone in order fund an exhibition, as well as lying about the warehouse being knocked down and needing to find new premises. Anne then breaks up with Fanto.
16 August–15 March 2000	Craig Harrison	Stephen Macklin	Craig is drinking at Lou's place with a group friends and they behave rowdily, despite warnings from Libby Kennedy, who is on duty. Craig and his friends take notice and continue with their behaviour. When Craig tries to grab some drinks from behind the bar, Geri Hallett warns him off and orders the group out, threatening to call the police. Craig later asks Steph Scully and Tess Bell for a dance at a nightclub but they decline, leaving.
18 August–7 June 2002	Maurie Ryan	Neil Fletcher	Maurie is a local builder who hires Billy Kennedy to work on his site. Maurie's dubious and dangerous work practices become evident when one of his apprentices, Sam Rodgers, is injured. Billy's sister, Libby does some investigating after Sam suffers a fall. Maurie threatens both Billy and Libby, but is arrested. Several months later, Joe Scully hires Maurie to work for him on his site. Maurie finds himself at loggerheads with Karl Kennedy, when Karl fails to notice a tumour in Maurie's wife Glenda's arm. Maurie threatens to sue for malpractice and only calls off the suit when Glenda loses patience with him. Maurie later tries to prevent Stuart Parker from working on the site as he is not a member of the Union, but Joe overrules him.
23 August–27 September	Sam Rodgers	Matthew Albert	Sam is a second year apprentice on Maurie Ryan's building site. Billy Kennedy notices that Sam is often the victim of practical jokes on the site, including one that left him injured. Maurie claims Sam is making it up, but Billy is suspicious. Sam thinks about quitting, but Billy tells him to keep working on the site as the apprenticeship will be worth it. Maurie orders Sam to work on the roof without a safety harness and Sam loses his footing and falls injuring his back. Billy's sister, Libby, begins investigating for the Erinsborough News and finds out about Maurie's work practices. Billy is skeptical at first, but then after seeing everything that happened with Sam, quits.
31 August–11 November	Desi Grant	Katherine McLean	Desi is the daughter of Portia Grant. When her mother buys local restaurant, Grease Monkeys, it quickly becomes a rival for the Lassiter's Coffee Shop, owned by Madge and Harold Bishop. A war breaks out between the two restaurants and Tad Reeves takes a job at Grease Monkeys, much to the chagrin of the Bishops. Desi threatens to sack Tad when he tries to cut back his hours due to falling grades at school. After learning about Tad's predicament, Libby Kennedy poses as a teenager applying for a job in order to expose the unfair working conditions to the Erinsborough News, but the ruse falls through, when Desi learns from Portia that Libby is a journalist. Libby wants to continue with the article, but Desi informs her that the investors have pulled out and the restaurant will be closing. Desi then calls a truce with the Bishops.
6 September–26 July 2001	Ralph Walker	Paul Collins	Ralph is a police officer. He spots some teenagers attempting to smash the window of Grease Monkeys but they get away. A month later, he arrests Paul McClain and Tad Reeves when they throw rocks at Teabag's house. He is also present when Libby Kennedy and Stephanie Scully are involved in a road accident with Brendan Bell. Ralph also investigates the theft of Karl Kennedy's car, Paul's alleged shoplifting and the theft of the Wigs for Kids charity fund. Following his promotion, Ralph is involved with Steph's problems with her ex-boyfriend Woody and when Drew Kirk assaults Nigel Armstrong.
8 September–29 April 2002	Cindy Lipman	Natasha Pincus	Cindy is a local photographer who takes pictures of Joel Samuels for a nude calendar and several years later, she takes publicity photos for Lassiter's which feature Marc Lambert and Felicity Scully.
28 September–26 June 2000	Viv Garnett	Emma Buckland	Viv is a nurse at Erinsborough Hospital. She treats Sam Rodgers following his fall on a building site and tends to Drew Kirk and Louise Carpenter on Millennium eve following a house fire. Viv also tends to Libby Kennedy following a motorcycle collision with Brendan Bell.
29 September	Steve Formosa	Cameron Knight	A stripper, who auditions for Natalie Rigby, but fails to impress her. After she lets him down, Steve passes Joel Samuels on the way out and wishes him good luck because he will need it.
29 September–20 October	Natalie Rigby	Nicki Paull	Natalie hires Joel Samuels as a barman, when his stripping audition fails, and they begin to get along well. When Joel discovers Natalie has a son, Liam, he is shocked, but tells her he does not care that she is a mother. However, Natalie and Joel's relationship begins to feel strange when she turns down invites to spend time with his friends as they are Joel's age and Natalie is much older. Liam, upon finding out about the relationship, warns Joel to stay away as Natalie's previous boyfriends have let them down. Natalie then breaks up with Joel.
4–15 October	Liam Rigby	Damien Bodie	
11 October 1999 – 30 April 2007	Lindsay Hall	Glenn Hunt	A volunteer for the Salvation Army, who befriends Harold Bishop. When Harold is mistaken for an armed robber and is arrested, Lindsay comes to see him. Harold offers his uniform back to Lindsay, who refuses to take it and reveals that everyone supports him. Lindsay later helps Harold to cope with the loss of his wife. After Harold's son, daughter-in-law and granddaughter die, Lindsay says a few words at their funeral. A couple of years later, Lindsay tells Harold that his dealings with so-called spiritualist Terrence Chesterton are conflicting with the Salvation Army's Christian views. Harold then returns his uniform to Lindsay.
27 October 1999 – 2 February 2001	Roy "Stanno" Stanley	Cameron Douglas	A biker friend of Stephanie Scully.
2–3 November	Katie Freeman	Nikki Visser	Katie is a prospective tenant for Number 30 Ramsay Street. She considers taking Toadfish Rebecchi's recently vacated room and Toadie's housemates Lance Wilkinson and Joel Samuels agree to Katie staying on a trial basis, due to their attraction to her. However, Katie's strict cleaning regime begins to irk them and when she insists Bob the dog will have to stay outside, they conspire to get rid of her. However, Katie's boyfriend Daryl calls and offers to move in with her and she leaves.
4 November–5 June 2002	Bianca Nugent	Jane Harber	Bianca becomes friends with Michelle Scully when she stands up to school bully Cecile Bliss. The girls get into various scrapes over the years and their friendship is tested when Bianca suggests that Elly Conway is out to steal Michelle's boyfriend Zack Shaw, but they later make up. While Michelle and Bianca are out together, Bianca falls down a storm drain. She is rescued by Michelle's father, Joe, and is not badly injured. However, her mother bans her from seeing Michelle for a while. Bianca makes her final appearance when she and some others tease Boyd Hoyland on his first day at Erinsborough High.
9 November	Kurt Hodges	Paul Glen	Kurt is David Hodges's father. When Kurt calls round to his son's warehouse, he meets Anne Wilkinson and tells her that the warehouse will be demolished soon. He then surprises Anne when he mentions that the tenants were living there rent free.
10 November–5 September 2000	Tim Harrison	Tom Budge	Tim is a student at Erinsborough High who works at Grease Monkeys. He is questioned by an undercover Libby Kennedy about the working conditions under manager Desi Grant. Tim tells Libby about the low pay and that employers are fired after age 18. He next appears to taunt Paul McClain and Tad Reeves when Harold Bishop is arrested on suspicion of armed robbery, prompting Paul to shove him. Tim is also present when a controversial book, Rainbow Alley is on the syllabus and discussed in class.
15 November	Rupert Coburn	Craig Blumeris	Rupert has a one-night stand with Charlie Thorpe, who then becomes obsessed with him. She sits in the back of his lectures and sends him love letters. Rupert meets Toadfish Rebecchi and learns that he is engaged to Charlie, whose work visa is running out. Rupert tells Toadie that Charlie is using him, so she can stay in the country and be closer to him. Rupert then shows Toadie one of Charlie's recent love letters.
23 November–27 January 2000	Chas Hancock	Don Hirst	Chas is a local councillor who Libby Kennedy interviews for an article in the Erinsborough News. Shortly after Chas' appointment as mayor, Geri Hallett Libby's colleague and rival is determined to expose an alleged affair between Chas and a woman named Pat Lemon, but is foiled when Chas and his wife appear to be a solid couple.
