= Ben Kirk =

Fictional character from the Australian soap opera Neighbours

- Neighbours character
- Felix Mallard as Ben Kirk (2016)
- Portrayed by: Noah Sutherland (2001–2003); Sean Berends (2004); Blake O'Leary (2007–2010); Felix Mallard (2014–2019)
- Duration: 2001–2004, 2007–2010, 2014–2019
- First appearance: 14 December 2001
- Last appearance: 7 January 2019
- Introduced by: Stanley Walsh (2001); Ric Pellizzeri (2004, 2007); Jason Herbison (2014)
- Book appearances: Facing Tomorrow
- Spin-off appearances: Xanthe ♥ Ben (2016); Pipe Up (2016); Summer Stories (2016)
In-universe information
- Other names: Baby K. Ben Kennedy-Kirk; Ben Fitzgerald
- Occupation: Student; Apprentice mechanic
- Family: Kennedy
- Father: Drew Kirk
- Mother: Libby Kennedy
- Stepfather: Daniel Fitzgerald
- Grandfathers: Karl Kennedy; Ron Kirk
- Grandmothers: Susan Kennedy; Rose Kirk
- Uncles: Malcolm Kennedy; Billy Kennedy; Stuart Kirk; Dougal Kirk
- Aunts: Sally Kirk; Holly Hoyland
- Other relatives: Tom Kennedy; Carmel Tyler; Liz Conway; Darcy Tyler; Elly Conway; Bea Nilsson; Aster Conway; Jackson Kennedy; Susannah Kennedy; Jemima Davies-Smythe; Trudy Callhoun

Ben Ian Kirk (also Kennedy-Kirk and Fitzgerald) is a fictional character from the Australian soap opera Neighbours, last played by Felix Mallard. The character was previously played by Noah Sutherland, Sean Berends and Blake O'Leary. He made his first screen appearance during the episode broadcast on 14 December 2001. Ben is the son of Libby Kennedy (Kym Valentine) and Drew Kirk (Dan Paris). Ben and Libby departed Ramsay Street in 2003, returning briefly the next year before moving to Shepparton with Darren Stark (Todd MacDonald). The family returned in 2007, with Libby and Ben remaining permanently. Ben departed Neighbours on 2 September 2010. In March 2014, it was announced that Ben and Libby would return, with Mallard cast as Ben. He made his screen return on 11 June 2014. The character returned again from 23 July 2015 until 16 November before making a permanent return on 31 March 2016, moving in with his grandparents. Mallard left the show in late 2017, with his on-screen departure airing on 10 April 2018. The character made two guest appearances on 31 December 2018 and 7 January 2019.

== Development ==
=== Early life ===
In 2001, Libby Kennedy (Kym Valentine) gave birth to her and husband Drew Kirk's (Dan Paris) son. The birth placed Libby's life in danger and she was rushed to intensive care with blood loss. Paris said "All their worst fears are realised, they both knew the birth would be risky for both Libby and the child – and while the baby is alright, Libby is still fighting for her life". Libby makes a recovery and she is allowed to hold her son for the first time. Valentine said "It's a wonderful moment when Libby holds her new-born baby". Off set, Valentine and Paris both bonded with Noah Sutherland who played their on-screen baby. Valentine told TV Week that Sutherland was "a complete natural" and that she had bonded with him "straight away". Paris admitted that he was a little nervous around the baby, saying "Working with Noah has been quite daunting – it's unfamiliar territory to me.

Libby and Drew struggle to name their new son and after a debate, they decide on Ben. Valentine revealed that she asked the producers to name the baby Ben after a close friend of hers who had died a few years before. Ben's middle name, Ian, is a tribute to Neighbours writer Ian Coughlan. The couple were then seen arguing over Ben's surname, with Libby unconvinced that Ben should be a Kirk. They later decide that he should be Ben K, until they resolve the situation. Libby and Drew are forced to choose a surname as Ben's baptism approaches. Valentine commented, "Libby's parents, Karl and Susan, are beside themselves, because they think you can't baptise a baby with just a Christian name. And Lou Carpenter – who is godfather – also wants them to decide once and for all. Libby and Drew feel like everyone is ganging up on them!" The couple eventually settle on Kennedy Kirk, and Ben is baptised in the same church his parents were married in.

=== Return (2007) ===
Following a brief appearance in 2004, the character and his mother returned permanently in 2007. Blake O'Leary originally auditioned for the role of Mickey Gannon, but his elder brother Fletcher O'Leary was handed the role instead. A few months later auditions for the character of Ben Kirk came up and O'Leary was cast in the role. Network Ten describe Ben as being "his mother's biggest supporter and her rock" following his father's death. They also say that Ben is a "loyal friend".

In August 2010, it was announced that O'Leary and Ben would be leaving the show in September. Of the reason for Ben's departure, a spokesperson said "The Ben character is younger than the other main kids, Sophie and Callum. They are now in high school, but Ben is still in junior school, so it was tricky to come up with storylines which involve all the kids".

=== Return (2014) ===
On 11 March 2014, it was announced that the character would be returning to Neighbours with Felix Mallard in the role. Ben came back to Erinsborough with Libby, and their return coincided with the Kennedy family's 20th anniversary on the show. Mallard said that his first impression of Ben was that he was "a pretty chilled-out country sort of kid, and he then comes to Erinsborough and gets into a bit of trouble..." In 2015 producers decided to reintroduce Ben to the series independently of Libby, and Mallard reprised the role in July 2015. On-screen, Ben moved in with his grandparents Karl (Alan Fletcher) and Susan Kennedy (Jackie Woodburne) on Ramsay Street. Following a break to accommodate the end of his schooling, Mallard appeared on a permanent basis from March 2016.

One of Ben's early storylines upon his 2015 return was dealing with the consequences of sending naked pictures to his ex-girlfriend, Emma. When Ben returned to Erinsborough, he was alone and distressed. Karl and Susan encouraged him to tell them what had happened, and Ben explained that he had broken up with his girlfriend. Ben then begged them to let him move in, as he needed to get away from Ballarat. Ben befriended their neighbour Tyler Brennan (Travis Burns) and they bonded over a dirt bike ride, which ended with Ben telling Tyler that he broke up with Emma as she posted naked pictures of him on her social media.

Tyler supported Ben, who became "isolated" from everyone at Erinsborough High. Susan grew concerned after Ben deleted his social media account and skipped school, after receiving a text message from an old friend in Ballarat. Susan started to think that Ben might self-harm and forced Tyler to tell her the truth behind Ben's behaviour. Ben was "humiliated" when the pictures were leaked online and his classmates saw them. Susan tried to help Ben find a way to deal with his shame, but it was his teacher Brad Willis (Kip Gamblin) who suggested that he take control of the controversy. Ben filmed himself revealing the history behind the pictures and the guilt and shame he felt about the leak, before showing the video to his classmates.

Once Ben had finally adjusted to living in Erinsborough, Karl wanted to bond with his grandson and was pleased when Ben joined him in playing the guitar. Karl believed Ben had inherited his musical talents and suggested they form a band. Ben was "secretly appalled" by the idea, especially after Karl revealed they would be playing a gig at a local nursing home. Ben did not want to hurt his grandfather's feelings, so he kept quiet as Karl named their band K-Squared. Ben later told Susan that he did not want to be a part of the band and she encouraged him to speak to Karl, but he was worried about breaking his heart.

=== Erinsborough High fire ===
In late 2015, the local high school was damaged by a fire. It soon emerged that Ben had accidentally started the fire. With Piper's encouragement, Ben lit a piece of paper on fire and held it under a sprinkler to set off the alarm system. However, it soon caused a "devastating fire" that left Piper's mother with burns to her body. Both Ben and Piper felt guilty about their actions, and Ben struggled as he watched Susan trying to deal with the aftermath. Although Piper urges him to keep quiet, Ben owns up to what he did and is charged with reckless conduct. As he realises that he is going to end up with a criminal record and a possible custodial sentence, Ben decides to run away with Piper. They get jobs as fruit pickers to raise money, but Piper has to work alone, as Ben struggles with pain from his fractured ribs, which he sustained after being struck by Sheila Canning's (Colette Mann) car. He later collapses.

=== Departure (2018) ===
On 26 February 2018, Daniel Kilkelly of Digital Spy confirmed Mallard had finished filming with the show in late 2017. Ben left Erinsborough on 19 March 2018, but he continued to make appearances via video calls after his departure. He made his final appearance on 10 April 2018. Ben's exit storyline begins with him feeling like he is "at a loose end", as he struggles to bond with Mark Brennan (Scott McGregor) at the garage. He is also unsure about what he wants for his future, unlike his girlfriend Xanthe Canning (Lily Van der Meer). His parents' friend Stephanie Scully (Carla Bonner) takes him to Oakey to visit Drew's family, and his uncle Dougal Kirk (Brandon Burns) realises that Ben reminds him of Drew and finds it difficult to be around him. After bonding, Dougal offers Ben a job at his garage and Ben decides to move to Oakey.

== Storylines ==
After Libby was injured during a bike accident, she was told that she would not be able to carry a child to full-term. When Libby does fall pregnant, she decides to keep the baby, despite being told that she could be risking her own life. While attending a rodeo in Oakey, Libby becomes locked in a barn and she goes into labour. She is eventually found by her father, Karl, and husband, Drew Kirk, and airlifted to hospital. Although Libby almost dies, Ben is born safely, but kept in the hospital for a few weeks. After his birth, Ben almost dies when he is locked in Libby and Drew's house while it is being fumigated. Ben is saved by Summer Hoyland (Marissa Siketa) who opens the back door. Libby, Drew and Ben go to visit Drew's father up in Oakey. While out riding, Drew falls from his horse and he dies, leaving Ben fatherless. Libby begins a relationship with Darren Stark (Todd MacDonald) and they leave Ramsay Street to live in Shepparton. Libby and Ben return without Darren three years later and Libby explains that Darren cheated on her. Darren arrives and tells Susan and Karl that Libby constantly told him that he was not Ben's father. He ends up leaving the Street alone.

Darren and Libby's split hurt Ben as Darren had been the only father he had known. Libby enrols Ben at Erinsborough Primary and he becomes friends with neighbour Mickey Gannon (Fletcher O'Leary). Libby meets Daniel Fitzgerald (Brett Tucker) and they start a relationship. Ben begins to look up to Dan and sees him as a father figure. Libby and Dan marry and Ben is a page boy at their wedding. Libby also finds out she is pregnant and Ben is excited to have a younger brother or sister around. However, Libby loses the baby, which makes Ben sad. Ben starts to feel out of place in his family as he was the only one with a different surname. Libby allows Ben to change his name to Fitzgerald, but this causes friction between Libby and Stephanie Scully. Ben tells Steph that he will leave his name the way it is, but Steph realises that it is none of her business and Ben changes his name.

Dan becomes a good stepfather to Ben and he does all the fatherly things with him. Ben and Dan's relationship goes through a rough patch when Dan threatens to hit Ben for misbehaving. Susan agrees to carry Libby and Dan's child and she becomes pregnant. However, she miscarries the baby and Libby has to tell Ben that he would not be a big brother. Libby and Dan decide to separate, leaving Ben without a father figure again. This hurts Ben and he asks Libby and Steph why no one wants him. Steph reassures him that Drew never wanted to leave. Ben continues to have a good relationship with Lucas Fitzgerald (Scott Major). Lucas helps Ben out with school, takes him on his motorbike and helps coach the soccer team.

Ben befriends Callum Jones (Morgan Baker) and they, along with Mickey and Charlie Hoyland (Jacob Brito), form a band. Ben becomes friends with Sophie Ramsay (Kaiya Jones) too and they join the soccer team, which is being coached by Andrew Robinson (Jordan Smith), until he is banned from training them. Libby takes over, which embarrasses Ben, as she does not know anything about soccer. Ben decides that he wants to be a dancer, after he gets a lesson from Sophie's sister, Kate (Ashleigh Brewer). Ben is hurt it emerges Steph is carrying Dan's baby and Libby tried to keep it from him. Libby initially stops Ben from attending Callum's birthday party, but she eventually relents. Ben complains that his teacher will not let him give a speech to the class as she believes that he did not complete an assignment. Ben believes his teacher does not like him. Libby meets with his teacher and she learns that Ben has been writing many stories. Libby gets Ben tested as she thinks he is bright and when he passes the test, he is accepted into an arts school in the country.

Almost four years later, Ben returns to Erinsborough with his mother when she accepts the role of acting deputy principal at Erinsborough High for three weeks. Ben enrols at the school and befriends Bailey Turner (Calen Mackenzie), when he notices he is being bullied by Jayden Warley (Khan Oxenham). Ben later gets into a fight with Jayden, earning himself a detention from Libby. Jayden blackmails Bailey into lying about what happened and Ben tells Libby that he started the fight. Libby suspends Ben, so Susan gets him a part-time job at the local garden nursery. Ben tells Karl that he is struggling being back in Erinsborough where his father grew up, and wants to leave. Ben eventually tells Libby the truth and he also decides to change his surname back to Kirk. Libby and Ben then leave for Oakey, so Ben can learn more about Drew's roots.

The following year, Ben turns up unannounced at Karl and Susan's house. He asks if he can stay with them, as Libby is going to China for work. Ben bonds with Tyler Brennan and reveals that his ex-girlfriend posted his naked photos online, leading to his move to Erinsborough to get away from the negative attention. Ben isolates himself at school and refuses to take part in a social media assignment set by Brad Willis. Ben skips school to hang out with Tyler. He refuses to open up to Karl and Susan when they notice his social media profile has been deleted. Tyler encourages Ben to take part in a school concert and his audition is successful. However, Ben soon learns that the other students have found his naked photos and he pulls out of the concert. Tyler tells Karl the truth about the photos, while Brad persuades Ben to own his mistake. Ben shows the students a video that he has recorded, in which he holds up cards detailing how he was in love and hoped that others would not make the same mistake. Karl suggests that he and Ben form a band called K-Squared and he organises a gig for them, but Ben does not want to play. Ben spends the day fixing a bike with Tyler and his father Russell (Russell Kiefel). They play practical jokes on him, but when Ben pulls Russell's trousers down, Russell loses his temper and threatens him. Karl stops Russell from hurting Ben.

Ben befriends Piper Willis (Mavournee Hazel) and helps her to film a segment for her vlog. He accidentally leaves the door to the garage unlocked, leading to the theft of the tools and Tyler's bike. After Libby comes back from China, Ben goes home. A few weeks later, Ben returns to help out with the protest to save Erinsborough High from closing. Piper berates him for speaking to his ex-girlfriend after everything she did. Piper later apologises and opens up to Ben about her ex-boyfriend. A fire breaks out at the school and Ben is treated for smoke inhalation. Sheila Canning accidentally reverses her car into Ben, leaving him with broken ribs. After seeing how upset Susan is about the school, Ben admits that he started the fire. Ben and Piper run away together to Glenrowan. They get jobs as fruit pickers to earn money to get to Sydney, but Ben is unable to work when his ribs cause him to collapse in pain. Piper calls a taxi to take him to the local hospital, while her parents and Karl and Susan track them down. Ben then returns to Ballarat.

Months later, Ben returns to stay with Karl and Susan. Xanthe Canning is instantly attracted to Ben. She invites herself over to the Kennedy's to spend time with Ben, and they drink some alcohol. Xanthe gets tipsy and is sick on Susan, who tells Ben not to spend time with Xanthe. The following day, Xanthe apologises to Ben and tries to make it up to him by arranging a meet-and-greet with Angus Young at Lassiter's Hotel. This turns out to be a ruse so they can spend time together, and they are briefly trapped in the hotel following an explosion, during which they find money belonging to Tom Quill (Kane Felsinger). Xanthe persuades Ben to take the money as Tom is believed to have been killed in the explosion, but he later turns up alive. Their theft of the money is discovered by Piper and Angus Beaumont-Hannay (Jai Waetford), who steals Ben's share. When Tom demands his money back, Ben, Xanthe and Angus sell old clothes and busk to raise the amount. Ben believes that Karl and Susan are favouring Angus over him and when Angus goes unpunished for spraying graffiti at the school, this makes him more angry, which leads to a fight between them. Ben learns Angus's mother Sarah Beaumont (Nicola Charles), has cancer and is asked not to tell Angus. However, he confides in Xanthe, who tells him. Angus runs away and takes the busking money. Ben and Xanthe find him at Off-Air and they try to persuade him to return. Ben takes Angus's passport, so he cannot leave the country, while Xanthe leaves to stop him from getting to the airport. Ben and Xanthe then confess to stealing Tom Quill's money.

Xanthe's father Gary Canning (Damien Richardson) pays Ben to take Xanthe to the school formal. Ben and Xanthe kiss, but when she learns Ben accepted the money from Gary, she breaks up with him. They later make up and arrange to meet, but Xanthe is late and Ben believes she has stood him up. He kisses Alison Gore (Madeleine Andreopoulos) and they briefly date, until Ben sets out to prove Xanthe was assaulted by Cooper Knights (Charlie Hannaford). Ben sings a song he wrote for Xanthe at The Waterhole and the couple get back together. Ben travels to the Gold Coast as Madison Robinson's (Sarah Ellen) guitarist, and Xanthe joins them. She and Ben plan to have sex, but Susan shows up and stops them. Xanthe and Ben are reunited with Angus, who returns to Erinsborough with them. He develops a crush on Ben's cousin Elly Conway (Jodi Anasta) and asks Ben to give him a tattoo to match hers. Angus, Ben and Xanthe sing at the Halloween school dance. Ben suspects Xanthe's mother Brooke Butler (Fifi Box) is scamming Karl, and Brooke later causes a rift between Ben and Xanthe. They break up as their families feud, but secretly get back together. Karl arranges for Ben and Xanthe to carry out their work experience at the hospital, but Ben decides that he wants to be a mechanic after working at the garage with Tyler. Finn Kelly (Rob Mills) convinces Ben to quit school and attend TAFE classes. Xanthe breaks up with Ben after falling for Finn, who has been manipulating her. Ben soon returns to school.

When he overhears Yashvi Rebecchi (Olivia Junkeer) and Luke Browne (Connor Harvey) gossiping about Xanthe, Ben shoves Luke into a locker, injuring Yashvi in the process. Yashvi admits that she encouraged Luke and joins Ben on punishment duty. Yashvi tells her friends that she and Ben are in a casual relationship. When Ben kisses her, Yashvi tells him she just wants to be friends. She later apologises for making up the rumours about them. Ben takes the blame for a muck up day prank to save Yashvi from being expelled, and Susan expels him instead. Ben and Xanthe realise they still have feelings for one another and they get back together. Ben tells the police that he heard Tyler arguing with Hamish Roche (Sean Taylor) before Hamish's death. Piper later asks Ben to change his statement, but after talking with Xanthe, she apologises to Ben. Ben and Xanthe have sex for the first time, and they are caught in bed by Terese Willis (Rebekah Elmaloglou). Ben misses Tyler after he is sent to prison and he struggles to bond with his new boss, and Tyler's brother, Mark Brennan (Scott McGregor).

Ben's grandparents send him Drew's old car to fix up. Ben asks Steph to help him and she later accompanies Ben to Oakey to visit Drew's family. Ben's uncle Dougal Kirk (Brandon Burns) is initially hesitant to spend time with him, as Ben reminds him of Drew too much, but they later work together and Dougal offers Ben a job at his garage. Ben turns down the offer, but he later reconsiders it and accepts. Xanthe agrees that they should try a long distance relationship. Ben visits Piper to say his goodbyes and Xanthe tells him that they will make their relationship work, before Susan drives him to the airport. Ben and Xanthe keep in touch via video calls and she later flies up to visit him, but Ben is busy and cannot spend much time with her. A week later, Ben comes back to Erinsborough to surprise Xanthe, but Xanthe has to study and later tells him that they have to break up. Ben says goodbye to his grandparents, Steph, Yashvi and Xanthe before driving back to Oakey in Drew's car. A few months later, Ben video calls Xanthe on New Year's Eve to tell her about a job offer at an aged care facility near to him in Oakey. He calls again when she contemplates rejecting her uni offer in Toowoomba, and convinces her to accept it.

== Reception ==
For his portrayal of Ben, O'Leary was nominated for Best Young Actor at the 2009 Inside Soap Awards. At the 2016 Digital Spy Reader Awards, Ben was nominated for the Biggest Unsung Hero accolade. A writer for the BBC said Ben's most notable moment was "Almost being born in a barn."

The character of Ben has been received negatively by Ruth Deller of television website Lowculture. She said "It's hard to believe something so evil is the child of Drew. One can only assume his father's horse-related death traumatised the child terribly, as otherwise there is no excuse for the brat's whining. Hopefully there'll be some sort of Ben gets redeemed storyline, because right now, he's fast threatening to overtake Hannah 'Button' Martin as the most irritating child to ever hit Ramsay Street". Deller has further commented on Ben stating: Ben has long been a contender for the most annoying child in Erinsborough award [...] He's been acting like a three-year-old despite being about ten putting on cutesy voices when making shite presents for 'the baby'. But worst of all, he idolises Fitzy, who isn't even the good Fitzgerald brother, and wants to get rid of the saintly Drew's surname, who (despite being long dead) any normal child would surely prefer to be named after."

In June 2014, Kerry Barrett from All About Soap was pleased to see Ben and Libby return, but could not help noticing that Ben's attitude. Barrett commented, "Maybe it was just his teenage moodiness, but he didn't seem over-excited to be back in Ramsay Street." She thought that it must have been difficult for Ben being back in the town where he was born and his father lived. Barrett added "We don't reckon he's happy about being back in Erinsborough. But the question is, will he tell Libby what he thinks?"

Writing for Digital Spy, Laura Morgan included Ben in her feature on the nine soap characters in need of a decent storyline. She wrote that both her colleagues and Woodburne (Susan) thought Mallard was "a huge talent", but wondered why his character had not been involved in anything more than small dramas with Xanthe. Morgan also pointed out that Xanthe, Piper and the rest of the teen characters have all had "their chance to shine" throughout 2016 and 2017, but Ben was sidelined. She added, "He deserves a slice of the action too, and given that Karl and Susan are his grandparents, we can't think it would be too tricky for the writers of Neighbours to come up with a suitable story to showcase his skills."
