= Sarah Beaumont =

- Neighbours character
- Portrayed by: Nicola Charles
- Duration: 1996–1999, 2005, 2013, 2016
- First appearance: 25 September 1996
- Last appearance: 28 June 2016
- Introduced by: Bill Searle (1996); Ric Pellizerri (2005); Richard Jasek (2013); Jason Herbison (2016)
In-universe information
- Occupation: Model; Boutique assistant Barmaid; Receptionist; Waitress; Nurse; Globewise Communications employee
- Mother: Bess O'Brien
- Half-sisters: Catherine O'Brien
- Husband: Peter Hannay (1999–2003)
- Sons: Angus Beaumont-Hannay
- Daughters: Antigone Beaumont-Hannay
- Nieces: Susannah Kennedy

Sarah Beaumont (also Hannay) is a fictional character from the Australian soap opera Neighbours, played by Nicola Charles. Shortly after Charles moved to Australia, she was encouraged to try out for a part in the serial by a drama coach. The actress received the role of Sarah and made her first screen appearance during the episode broadcast on 25 September 1996. In January 1999, it was announced that Charles had decided to quit Neighbours to move to London with her then fiancé. She filmed her final scenes in April 1999 and Sarah departed on-screen on 13 July 1999. Charles later appeared in the show's 20th anniversary episode, which was broadcast in July 2005. Charles reprised the role in 2012 and Sarah made a six-week return from 4 February 2013. She returned again from 5 April 2016.

Sarah is Bess O'Brien's (Diana McLean) daughter and Catherine O'Brien's (Radha Mitchell) half-sister. She returned to Australia shortly after she jilted her British fiancé. Charles' British and Brazilian heritage was incorporated into Sarah's background and personality. One of the character's most notable storylines saw her fall in love with and share a kiss with Karl Kennedy (Alan Fletcher), a married doctor. Charles wrote the storyline between Sarah and Karl and it provided Neighbours with an increase in ratings. Peter Hannay (Nick Carrafa) was introduced as a love interest for Sarah in May 1999 and they went on to get married. Sarah shared another kiss with Karl, before departing Australia with Peter. Off-screen, Sarah moved to London and had two children.

== Creation and casting ==
Charles landed the role of Sarah shortly after moving to Australia to be with her then boyfriend, Scott Michaelson. A drama coach suggested that Charles try out for a part on Neighbours and when she did, the producers were so impressed that they created the role of Sarah for her. Charles commented that it was "very exciting" to be joining the cast of Neighbours and added "At home in England I was a big fan of the show. I used to rush home from school to watch Jason and Kylie." Of Charles' casting, a spokesperson stated "Nicola has real star potential. We think she's going to be a big hit." Charles initially trained to be an actress and a dancer, but she spent six years modelling. Of her struggle to fit in and be accepted by the cast of Neighbours, Charles revealed "I was seen as an ex-model and no one expected I'd be able to act. But I knew I could do it and I think I shocked them all. Soon after I joined, the script editor told me he thought I could handle any storyline he threw at me, which was a huge compliment."

== Development ==
=== Background ===
The writers incorporated Charles' British and Brazilian heritage into Sarah's background and personality. Dave Lanning from The People commented that Sarah was "a Tasmanian-born half Brazilian raver". Sarah relocated from the UK to Erinsborough as she was "trying to escape a tortured past." She had been engaged to Lord Steven Harrow (Stewart Morritt), but she jilted him and fled to Australia. Sarah is the daughter of Bess O'Brien (Diana McLean) and half-sister to Catherine O'Brien (Radha Mitchell). Bess was a "dedicated environmental campaigner" who spent more time fighting for causes than bringing up her daughters. When Bess visited Sarah, the reunion was not a happy one, as they had a few issues to deal with. Bess realised that it was going to be hard to make things right with Sarah, but she knew that her daughter was going through a tough time and wanted to help her.

=== Matt Compton ===
Sarah's first romance was with her housemate, Matt Compton (Jonathan Kovac). Matt was a policeman who came to Ramsay Street to rent the spare room at Number 30. Charles revealed that there was an instant attraction between Sarah and Matt and she jumps at the chance to have him as a housemate as soon as she sees him. Sarah's other housemate, Ben Atkins (Brett Cousins), is not so keen as he does not want to live with a policeman. However, Sarah gets her own way and Matt soon moves in. Charles explained that she was "really pleased" to finally have a love interest, but did not want her character to settle into a long-term relationship. She said "the ups and downs are much more interesting to do than the smoochy scenes." Sarah and Matt soon began dating and their romance marked Charles and Kovac's first on-screen love scenes.

=== Affair with Karl Kennedy ===
One of Sarah's most notable storylines saw her fall in love with and kiss Karl Kennedy (Alan Fletcher). Sarah and Karl revealed their feelings for each other at the end of the 1997 season and Craig Platt of The Age called it one of the serial's "most memorable" cliffhangers. Sarah and Karl's sexual tension became central to the show throughout 1998 and the storyline gave Neighbours a large ratings boost. Karl was married to Sarah's friend, Susan (Jackie Woodburne), and when she found out about the affair, she was devastated. Karl and Susan's daughter, Libby (Kym Valentine), was also upset, as she was close friends with Sarah and knew that she had been in love with a married man. Sarah's life started to fall apart when she was unable to let go of Karl and Susan was not happy with Karl maintaining a friendship with her. Charles wrote the storyline between Sarah and Karl, but not the script. She told an Inside Soap writer that she had no idea it would be so successful or have such an impact.

=== Relationship with Peter Hannay ===
Dr. Peter Hannay (Nick Carrafa) was introduced to Neighbours in May 1999, as a love interest for Sarah. Peter knew Sarah's mother and when he mentioned that he was spending some time in Erinsborough, she suggested that he visited her daughter. Peter took Sarah out to dinner and after getting on well, they began a relationship. Peter shocked Sarah when he asked her to marry him after five weeks, but she accepted. A writer from Inside Soap proclaimed that Sarah had not had much luck with men in the past, but they hoped that Peter would break the pattern and mend her broken heart. Sarah asked Lou Carpenter (Tom Oliver) to give her away and Amy Greenwood (Jacinta Stapleton) to be her bridesmaid at the wedding. Charles helped design her character's dress at the same time she designed her own gown. She commented "I was working on both gowns at the same time and trying to keep them different." When Sarah was left stranded and late for the ceremony, Karl came to her rescue and gave her a lift to the church.

Of the wedding, Sydney Morning Herald writer Doug Anderson said "Can Sarah Beaumont make it to the altar on time to tie the knot (around her neck preferably), with Dr Peter Hannay? All the leftover mishaps from the stage play, Secret Bridesmaid's Business, are slathered over the screen as Karl sulks darkly somewhere and Lou carries on like a counter lunch. Not for the fainthearted." During the ceremony, a specially-written song called "Flowers", sung by Janine Maunder, was played. The single was made available to purchase from the Neighbours website after the episode aired. Shortly after she married Peter, Sarah kissed Karl in the vestry and Peter very nearly saw. An Inside Soap columnist explained "Sarah and Karl give into the feelings they've been stifling for months, and share an illicit passionate kiss." Sarah then left the country with Peter, so she could accompany him as he treated patients around the world.

=== Departure and cameo appearance ===
On 7 January 1999, Matthew Wright from the Daily Mirror reported that Charles was quitting Neighbours to move to London with her new fiancé. Charles had gotten engaged to London-based actor Jason Barry, while she still had a year-long contract with Neighbours. Charles then had to choose whether to continue with Neighbours or quit to be with Barry. The actress decided to stay and see her contract out as she did not want to let anyone down. Charles filmed her final scenes in April 1999 and Sarah departed the show after marrying Peter.

In January 2005, Neil Wilkes from Digital Spy reported that producers were trying to get Charles to return to Neighbours for a cameo appearance in their 20th anniversary episode. A month later it was confirmed that Charles had agreed to reprise her role. Charles revealed that she was "thrilled" to be asked to return for the anniversary special, but she equally "horrified at the prospect" because she had recently given birth to her daughter and felt overweight. The actress was happy when the producers suggested that she filmed her scenes in her back garden. Charles explained "The storyline saw an old character, Annalise Hartman, making a video documentary about all the old Neighbours characters and what they are up to now. A lot of us have moved to London so it made sense to film it here. It was very exciting and it was great to be part of such good show again. It made me very nostalgic."

=== Return (2013) ===
In a 2011 interview with Jason Herbison from Inside Soap, Charles revealed that she would love to return to Neighbours. The actress said "I've always felt that the loose ends between Sarah and Karl weren't tied up. I'd love her to return with a son who turns out to be Karl's!" On 4 November 2012, it was announced that Charles had reprised her role and Sarah would return to Neighbours for six weeks. Speaking to Daniel Kilkelly from Digital Spy, Charles said that she received an email from the serial's executive producer after the Inside Soap interview was published and she "made it quite clear" that she was open to a return. When asked if a return was something she had to take time to think about, Charles told Kilkelly "When the magazine first posed the question I was stunned. I had never imagined a return would be possible. But my husband Mark had always felt that I should revisit Sarah and so I had pondered it for a while. The answer was always going to be yes." Charles began filming her return scenes in October and commented that she was open to a longer stint with the show in the future. Sarah returned on 4 February 2013.

Charles told Kilkelly that she found it easy to slip back into the character of Sarah and thought that it was more fun now she is "a grown-up". Describing how her character's personality had changed, Charles stated "Sarah has changed immeasurably. She is smarter, thinks faster, knows herself better and has a valid perspective on what happened. Being a mother seems to have been the making of her, and I can easily draw parallels from my own life for that." Sarah now has two children, but Kilkelly reported that while she would make references to them, neither one would be seen on-screen. Charles admitted that while Karl is not the reason Sarah returns to Erinsborough, she would be catching up with him and Susan. When asked if Sarah is over Karl, Charles said "Is Sarah over Karl? Gosh, that's an eternal question, isn't it? Are we really ever over our exes? Sarah is separated from her husband Peter Hannay and is therefore single." The actress added that there would be tension between Sarah and Susan, while any questions about what happened between Sarah and Karl would be answered.

=== Return (2016) ===
On 7 March 2016, it was announced Charles had agreed to reprise the role once again and that Sarah would make her return the following month on 5 April. Sarah will return "under a cloud of suspicion", and leave some people questioning whether she wants Karl or has another agenda. The show's series producer Jason Herbison stated, "Sarah Beaumont is a wonderful character that doesn't need an introduction, viewers wait with bated breath for her next move and the latest instalment will surprise everyone."

== Storylines ==
Sarah arrives in Erinsborough and successfully applies for a job at Danni Stark's (Eliza Szonert) clothes shop. Sarah then calls Luke Handley (Bernard Curry) after seeing an advert for a room at Number 30 for rent. Sarah appears eager to live in Ramsay Street and she admits that her sister, Catherine, lives there. When she is asked why their surnames are different, Sarah admits that she used her father's surname when she became a model. Sarah starts receiving phone calls from UK journalists and Joanna Hartman (Emma Harrison) recognises her from some magazines. Catherine discovers that Sarah was engaged to Lord Steven Harrow, but she had jilted him. Sarah decides to leave town when she hears that Steven is coming to Erinsborough, but Catherine convinces her to stay. Sarah and Steven talk through their problems and agree to be friends. Sarah's neighbour, Toadfish Rebecchi (Ryan Moloney), becomes infatuated with her and tries to fight Steven on her behalf. Sarah thanks Toadie with a kiss and he tells everyone that they are a couple. Sarah tells him off and they become friends.

Sarah gets a job at Lou's Place, but has trouble adjusting to being looked at by the male customers. She then finds employment as a receptionist at Karl Kennedy's surgery. Sarah battles Marlene Kratz (Moya O'Sullivan) for the title of "Receptionist of the Year", but drops out when she learns the competition is actually to find a model rather than a competent receptionist. When Sarah saves the life of a patient at the surgery, she decides to take on a basic first aid training course. Sarah and Ben Atkins advertise for another housemate and policeman Matt Compton applies. Sarah is impressed by Matt and after he moves in, they begin dating. Matt later receives a transfer to a station in Port Campbell and leaves. He and Sarah agree to a long-distance relationship, but they break up a few weeks later.

Sarah, feeling depressed at work one day is comforted by Karl and the pair share a kiss. Karl tells Sarah he is a married man and nothing can come of it and Sarah quickly agrees to forget it, but she cannot and things are tense in the surgery. Several sets of circumstances cause Karl and Sarah to be thrown together, arousing suspicion. Sarah becomes increasingly distressed about the situation and leaves town. Toadie tracks her to a caravan park and she enlists his help in avoiding Karl. Karl finds out from Toadie where Sarah is staying and visits Sarah to convince her to return home. After sharing a meal Karl decides that they've both had too much wine to drive home that night. He books them separate rooms at a nearby hotel for the night. After Toadie hears from Karl's son, Billy (Jesse Spencer) that Karl spent the night at a hotel he lets slip that Karl must have spent the night with Sarah. Billy then tells his mother, Susan, who throws Karl out. Sarah completes her nursing diploma and begins working at Erinsborough Hospital. She meets Alex Fenton (Guy Hooper) and they begin dating. However, the relationship ends when Sarah learns that Alex has been seeing Karen Oldman (Pia Miranda) too. Sarah is stalked by Richard Downing (John Arnold), a psychiatric patient from the hospital who had become obsessed with her. Sarah decides not to press charges when Richard is arrested. After resuscitating Deidre Kaufmann (Lidia Faranda), a patient who went into cardiac arrest, Sarah is reprimanded by the hospital board as she is not qualified enough to perform such procedures. She is suspended and Karl tells her to fight for her job.

Sarah's mother, Bess, arrives in town and she and Sarah immediately clash. Bess reveals to Sarah's friends that she named her Shakira Sunshine, but Sarah and Catherine took more mainstream names at school to fit in. Sarah and Bess manage to make peace before Bess leaves. Sarah learns that Bess has set her up with Peter Hannay and is initially reluctant to meet him. However, she and Peter fall in love and he asks her to marry him within a few months. On the day of the wedding, the bridal car breaks down and Karl offers Sarah a lift. After a second breakdown, they finally make it to the church thanks to a passing police car. After the wedding, while Sarah is in the vestry preparing for the wedding photos, Karl tells her how beautiful she looks and they share one final kiss. Sarah and Peter marry and leave Erinsborough for Amsterdam. Sarah attends Catherine's wedding to Malcolm Kennedy (Benjamin McNair) in London and it is revealed that she and Peter have had a daughter called Antigone. Two years later, Sarah splits from Peter and she phones Karl for a reference as she is looking for a new job. Karl obliges, but Susan rewords the reference before Karl sends it off. Sarah then arranges for several bags of manure to be dumped on the front lawn of Number 28 in retaliation. Sarah appears in Annalise Hartman's documentary about Ramsay Street and mentions that she was not fooled when Toadie sent her Bib, a dog almost an exact double of her pet, Bob. Sarah then states that she learned a few hard lessons in Erinsborough and that some people could be narrow-minded, before blowing Karl a kiss.

As a representative from a large media company, Sarah returns to Erinsborough fourteen years later to oversee the purchase of the Erinsborough News from Paul Robinson (Stefan Dennis). Sarah catches Callum Jones (Morgan Baker) filming her and when she confronts him, he reveals that he knows who she is. Sarah gives him some money to keep quiet. She later goes to the hospital to see Karl and asks him to visit her at Lassiter's. Sarah apologises for what happened between them and Karl begs her to her not to tell anyone that they had sex together. He also mentions that he and Susan have separated. Susan later catches Sarah and Karl together outside the hotel. Sarah apologises to her and Karl, before they go for a drink. Susan then learns that Sarah is the representative for the company buying the newspaper. Sarah catches up with Toadie and later reveals that she is staying around for longer than originally intended. Karl explains that he wants to get back with Susan, but she has filed for divorce. Susan confronts Sarah about their issues and Sarah later visits Karl. She tells him that her marriage to Peter was a big disaster, but her children, Antigone and Angus, are the best thing that ever happened to her. They then share a kiss, but Karl pulls away, realising that is a mistake. Toadie asks Sarah whether she had anything to do with Susan seeking a divorce from Karl and Sarah hopes that she did not. Sarah then meets with Susan and tells her that Karl still loves her. She tries to ask Susan if her presence has influenced her decision to get a divorce, but Susan replies that it has not. Paul asks Sarah to become project manager of his new development at Lassiter's, but she turns him down. Shortly before she leaves for London, Sarah is surprised when Susan thanks her for helping her to reunite with Karl.

A couple of years later, Sarah returns to Erinsborough and asks Karl to meet her at Lassiter's Hotel. She suffers a sprained ankle and leg injury when the boiler room explodes and Karl treats her, before helping her from the hotel. Sarah asks when they can talk, just as Susan sees them together. Sarah comes to Ramsay Street to thank Karl for helping her, but as he is out, Ben Kirk (Felix Mallard) lets her wait inside with him. Sarah asks various questions about Karl and Susan's relationship. Sheila Canning (Colette Mann) later invites Sarah to stay at Number 26 with her and her granddaughter Xanthe (Lily Van der Meer). Sarah continues to ask about Susan and Karl's life, and she later makes an advance towards Karl, but he does not act on it. After Susan accidentally traps Sarah's fingers in her car door, Karl treats her at the hospital and she reveals to him the reason why she is in town. However, she asks him to keep it quiet. Toadie later finds Sarah in pain at the garden nursery and takes her to The Waterhole. Sarah overhears Julie Quill (Gail Easdale) saying Lassiter's is short staffed and she offers her services, which Julie accepts. When Susan confronts her, Sarah reveals that she is dying from cancer. She then tells Karl that she came to town to ask him and Susan to take care of her son Angus (Jai Waetford) indefinitely and they agree to do so. Sarah explains that she has decided to stop chemotherapy treatment, but Karl and Susan encourage her to fight, and Karl later gets her a place at a German research centre. Sarah warns the Kennedys that Angus might react badly to her departure, before she flies out to Germany. Sarah returns the following month and reveals that the treatment is going well. She apologises to Angus for not telling about her cancer and asks him to come to Germany with her, while she continues her treatment. Sarah later rings Karl to tell him that she is in remission.

== Reception ==
A writer for the BBC's Neighbours website said Sarah's most notable moment was her affair with Karl. Viewers voted Sarah's wedding to Peter the second "Best storyline of 1999" in the Neighbours.com Awards. Of Sarah's arrival, Lanning quipped "Jaws dropped and blood pressure soared among the randy young bucks of Ramsey Street at the arrival of a bedazzling new bimbo on the block in Neighbours". Speaking positively of Sarah, a writer from Virgin Media stated "She was the sole reason teenage boys tuned into Neighbours each night between 1996 and 1999. And after Sarah Beaumont had that affair with dishy doc, Karl Kennedy, she quickly became the hot topic around the water coolers nationwide..."

In 2007, a reporter from the Herald Sun placed Karl and Sarah's affair at number eight on their list of Neighbours Top Ten moments. They said "In one of the most shocking storylines, no one could believe that the perfect Dr Karl, played by Alan Fletcher, could cheat on his wife of many years, Susan, played by Jackie Woodburne. But, that's exactly what happened when he couldn't resist his receptionist Sarah Beaumont played by the vampy Nicola Charles". Simon Kent of The Sun-Herald said Sarah had a "waspish tongue and sharpish put down", while Tony Squires of The Sydney Morning Herald branded her "luscious." Squires' colleague Ben Pobjie wrote that everyone remembers where they were at the time they watched Karl kiss Sarah behind Susan's back. In 2022, Kate Randall from Heat stated that "we'll never forgive you, Sarah" for destroying the Kennedy's marriage. Katie Baillie writing for Metro included Sarah on a list of the "worst Neighbours characters" ever. Baillie explained that Sarah was the root cause of Susan and Karl's problems. However, Baillie thanked the character for creating the infamous slap scene when Susan attacked Karl. In 2015, a Herald Sun reporter included Sarah and Karl's first kiss in their "Neighbours' 30 most memorable moments" feature.
