= Rebecca Ritters =

Australian journalist and actress (born 1984)

- Born: 26 January 1984 (age 42); Melbourne, Australia
- Occupation: DW News journalist
- Years active: 1992–present
- Employer: DW News

Rebecca Ritters (born 26 January 1984) is an Australian journalist and current news anchor for Deutsche Welle. Prior to her journalism career, she was an actress.

== Career ==
She is also known as an actress, mostly for her role as Hannah Martin in the soap opera Neighbours. She first appeared in the show in 1992 when she was eight years old, and remained for a further seven years. Ritters briefly reprised the role of Hannah as part of Neighbours' 20th anniversary celebrations.

After leaving Neighbours in 1999, Ritters appeared as Caz in the Australian soap Pig's Breakfast in 2000, and as Amelia Porter in Blue Heelers in 2001.

In 2002, Ritters toured with the British Shakespeare Company in an open-air production of Romeo and Juliet, playing Juliet opposite Tama Matheson as Romeo, and in the same year played Peaseblossom in A Midsummer Night's Dream with Wayne Sleep as Puck, also an open-air production. In December 2002 and January 2003, she also played Dorothy in The Wizard of Oz at the Hazlitt Theatre in Maidstone, Kent. Also in 2002 she appeared in the British soap opera Coronation Street, playing Australian backpacker Jules Robinson who briefly boarded with Les Battersby, and who playfully sent up his mistaken belief that she intended to seduce him.

Ritters travelled extensively throughout Europe and America, working on the stage in the UK. She had a short stint in the Australian medical drama All Saints, in which she played Nurse Rachel Simms.

Ritters then worked as a news and current affairs producer for the Australian Broadcasting Corporation. In 2015, she started as a journalist for Deutsche Welle in Berlin.

== Acting credits ==
=== Television ===
Year	Title	Role	Type
1992–1999; 2005	Neighbours	Hannah Martin	TV series, 507 episodes
2000	Pig's Breakfast	Caz	TV series, 2 episodes
2000; 2001	Blue Heelers	Amelia Porter / Libby Orr	TV series, 2 episodes
2002	Coronation Street	Jules Robinson	TV series, 3 episodes
2005	Life	Ida	TV movie
2007	All Saints	Nurse Rachel Simms	TV series, 6 episodes
2010	Rush	Miranda / Crystal	TV series, 2 episodes

=== Theatre ===
Year	Title	Role	Type
2002	Romeo and Juliet	Juliet	British Shakespeare Company
2002	A Midsummer Night's Dream	Peaseblossom	British Shakespeare Company
2003	The Wizard of Oz	Dorothy	Hazlitt Theatre in Maidstone, Kent
