= Libby Kennedy =

Fictional character in the Australian soap opera Neighbours

- Neighbours character
- Kym Valentine as Libby Kennedy (2009)
- Portrayed by: Kym Valentine; Michala Banas (2008)
- Duration: 1994–2005, 2007–2011, 2014, 2022
- First appearance: 3 October 1994
- Last appearance: 28 July 2022
- Introduced by: Ian Bradley (1994); Ric Pellizzeri (2007); Jason Herbison (2014)
- Book appearances: Facing Tomorrow
In-universe information
- Occupation: Student; Newsagency assistant; Journalist; Barmaid; Waitress; Carpenter's Mechanics owner; Teacher
- Family: Kennedy
- Father: Karl Kennedy
- Mother: Susan Kennedy
- Brothers: Malcolm Kennedy; Billy Kennedy
- Half-sisters: Holly Hoyland
- Husband: Drew Kirk (2001–2002); Daniel Fitzgerald (2009–2010)
- Sons: Ben Kirk
- Grandfathers: Ronald Davies-Smythe; Tom Kennedy (adoptive)
- Grandmothers: Molly Kennedy; Grace Smith
- Aunts: Liz Conway; Carmel Tyler; Jemima Davies-Smythe
- Nephews: Jackson Kennedy
- Nieces: Susannah Kennedy
- First cousins: Darcy Tyler; Elly Conway; Bea Nilsson; Trudy Callhoun
- Other relatives: Aster Conway; Jasper Callhoun

Libby Kennedy (also Kennedy-Fitzgerald) is a fictional character from the Australian soap opera Neighbours, played by Kym Valentine. She made her first appearance during the episode broadcast on 3 October 1994. Valentine auditioned for the role when she was 15, and upon being cast as Libby, she relocated from Sydney to Melbourne, where the show is filmed. Libby was introduced along with her parents and brothers during a period of low ratings for the show. Valentine departed on 2 October 2003, before returning for six months the following year and a single episode on 27 July 2005. She returned on a permanent basis on 12 November 2007.

Libby's storylines have included being involved in a motorbike accident, the loss of her husband Drew Kirk, giving birth to Ben Kirk, marrying Daniel Fitzgerald and subsequently separating from him. In 2008, Valentine was forced to take sick leave for one month and executive producer, Susan Bower, made the decision to temporarily recast McLeod's Daughters actress Michala Banas in the role for a month. Valentine temporarily left Neighbours in 2010 due to ill health and, after returning to filming briefly, took indefinite leave the following year. Valentine's contract with the series lapsed later in 2011, with Libby having not appeared on-screen since 26 May. Valentine reprised the role for a three-week guest appearance in June 2014, and for the show's then final episode on 28 July 2022.

== Creation and casting ==
In 1994, Neighbours' storyliners decided to introduce the "solid" Kennedy family. They felt that they needed to take the show back to its roots when it seemed that all the houses on Ramsay Street were populated with misfits and distant relatives. The show was also suffering from low ratings, and the Kennedys were brought in to "bring a fresh burst of energy". Alan Fletcher and Jackie Woodburne were cast as Karl Kennedy and Susan Kennedy, with Benjamin McNair and Jesse Spencer cast as brothers Malcolm Kennedy and Billy Kennedy.

The role of the Kennedy's only daughter went to actress Kym Valentine. She first auditioned for the role of Libby when she was 15 in her home town of Sydney. She recalled: "I'd been in Home and Away, and in a sitcom called My Two Wives, but Neighbours was a much bigger thing. For starters, it is filmed in Melbourne, so getting the part meant that I had to move there. I didn't know anyone at all, so it was pretty terrifying." Kristy Wright, who went on to star in Home and Away, was asked to audition for the role, but upon learning that she would have to relocate to Melbourne, she thought that it was "such a big step" that she decided not to audition. Both Wright and Valentine attended the same talent school as children, and Wright expressed her delight that her friend had been cast, saying "I was so happy that she won the part – and when I saw her on air, I thought she was fantastic."

Valentine began working on Neighbours when she was 17. She admitted that leaving her family behind in Sydney was the hardest part about joining the show, but she "seized" the role of Libby and was determined to be a success. The Kennedys were described as a believable family, and Valentine thought it down to the actors' close bond off-screen. She said they were "like a surrogate family to me, and still are." Discussing her longevity in 2000, Valentine explained that she stayed with Neighbours as it provided her with work, and she felt she was still learning and being challenged by the role.

== Character development ==
=== Characterisation ===
"The looks of her mother, the stubbornness of her father – quite a formiddable combination, and one that makes Libby Kennedy quite unstoppable."

— The BBC on Libby

Upon her introduction to Neighbours, Libby was described as an opinionated girl who makes a stand on "any and every issue." She is as a communist and her political views frustrate her father. She initially wants to go into a government job, but she studies journalism at university instead. The teenage Libby was said to be bright, inquisitive and "prim and proper." Her "wise beyond her years" side has followed her into adulthood and Libby is now a "passionate and idealistic" woman. She is hard working, honest, headstong and focused on her career and life goals. Libby has a humorous and quirky side, which Valentine loves acting out. The BBC said "there's no keeping that irrepressible sense of humour down. She loves a good laugh."

On Valentine's return to the Neighbours set in January 2011, she decided to cut her long hair off in favour of a short hairstyle. It was also revealed that Libby would return with a new attitude to life. She has spent time at a health retreat, learnt the "art of Zen" and now refuses to judge anyone. Valentine said that Libby wants "to detach from negativity." She added "She looks at her situation – single mum, still living with her parents – and starts to focus on her career at the school."

=== Departure and return ===
On 5 June 2003, Valentine filmed her final scenes before taking six months maternity leave from the show. She became the first ever actress to take maternity leave from Neighbours. Valentine stated "I was so clucky a few years ago, and I was sussing it out, just what would happen out of curiosity and how they would deal with it. I couldn't believe it – it's an amazing stroke of luck that for nearly 20 years that the show's been going, and they haven't had any long-term cast member fall pregnant. Trust me to be the first." Valentine also admitted that the producers had difficulty hiding her pregnancy before she left. On-screen, Libby takes a break from Erinsborough.

Valentine decided to depart Neighbours in 2004, so she could pursue other acting roles and spend time with her daughter. However, she did make a brief return in 2005 for the show's 20th anniversary episode, "Friends for Twenty Years". In 2007, Neighbours suffered a decline in ratings and plans were made to take storylines "back to basics", so they would be less controversial and focus more on relationships and family dynamics. It was then announced that Valentine would be reprising her role of Libby. Of her comeback Valentine said "I really felt like I was coming home and it was very easy to slip back into the role of Libby, she's like an old friend. Plus she was older and the writers were able to do a lot more with her so it was a great time to return." Valentine initially intended to return to Neighbours for a brief time.

=== Temporary recast ===
On 4 July 2008, Valentine collapsed on a flight home from New York and was diagnosed with pneumonia and a collapsed lung. Valentine was told that she needed to rest for a month and that she could not return to work on Neighbours. news.com.au initially reported that Libby would be written out of scenes for a week. However, as the character was involved in too many storylines, executive producer Susan Bower realised that she could not be suddenly written out of the show and she took the decision to temporarily recast the role of Libby. Bower called McLeod's Daughters actress Michala Banas and asked her to take over the role. Banas only had four days to research Libby's history on the show and learn the scripts before she began filming. Banas told the Herald Sun "It was crazy, a whirlwind. I spent the first week of filming really stressing about it – am I doing this right, is this what Libby would do, am I making the right choices? I felt this real sense of responsibility to Kym and to the character and to the show. I just wanted to do the best job I could for everyone."

Banas explained that Libby is a strong woman with a lot of energy and she tried to keep the essence of the character in her portrayal. However, she said that the only way she could "tackle" the role was to make Libby her own. She added "I came to the realisation that I can't be the same Libby as Kym is – it's impossible." Banas was reunited with Brett Tucker, her co-star from McLeod's Daughters, for Libby's storylines. Of her character being recast, Valentine said "It is like handing over a child to be looked after by somebody else". She later returned to the set on 15 September 2008. In May 2009, a short video was created which made light of the recast. The clip, featuring Valentine, Fletcher and Woodburne, saw Susan and Karl questioning Libby over why she changed her head.

=== Marriage to Daniel Fitzgerald and surrogacy ===
Libby's relationship with Darren Stark (Todd MacDonald) comes to an abrupt end after he kisses Janae Timmins (Eliza Taylor-Cotter), but Libby soon finds romance again with Daniel Fitzgerald (Brett Tucker). Valentine told TV Week that Libby decides that she has had enough of Darren and their relationship is over for good. Then over the next few months there is a hint of romance for Libby and Dan. Tucker said that there is "an immediate attraction" for Dan when it comes to Libby. Dan hides some secrets from Libby and when she discovers them, there is "an emotional upset." Valentine explained "Libby will begin to feel like she's being constantly let down by men. She can't seem to take a trick. Guys just keep disappointing her." Tucker added that it was never planned for Libby and Dan to have a trouble free relationship, although he previously thought otherwise. When she was asked to choose between Dan and Drew, Valentine chose Dan and she explained "I do honestly think that Dan is more her match. [...] I just think Dan and Libby are very similar like with their careers – they've got a lot more in common, they're both teachers and they're both very articulate and educated. I think maybe Libby and Dan can entertain each other a little bit more, in many different ways, than Libby and Drew could." Libby and Dan's relationship does not run smoothly and Dan's ex-wife Samantha (Simone Buchanan) causes problems for them. Sam lies to Dan that she is pregnant with his child and when the lie is exposed, Libby sees Dan is upset that he does not have a child. Valentine told Digital Spy; "when Libby sees how upset Dan is about it all, she desperately wants him to have his own child. So for the next few months, we've got this long-term storyline based around Libby wanting to have a baby with Dan which we all know is incredibly risky because she could die if she has another baby."

Libby and Dan later marry. During an interview, Susan Bower said that there is nothing interesting in watching an on-screen marriage that is working and she highlighted her plans for the couple; "It's a very, very slow, long burn and there's some wonderful humour and the fact there's the Brady Bunch a bit. We are making stories about what happens in people's lives and there's the good and the bad." Libby and Dan decide to have a child via surrogacy. Libby's mother, Susan offers to become the surrogate after Libby is unable have any more children. Following a fight with the hospital board, Susan becomes pregnant. However, this causes friction between her and Dan. Following a fall, Susan loses the baby. Alan Fletcher said he was pleased at the way the surrogacy scenes were handled and he added "The notion of a mother being a surrogate for their daughter is something you can't pretend is not controversial. The writers embraced that and showed how Susan's decision divided the community, and has potential to divide the family". The show's timeslot presented difficulties for the storyline and the writers were forced to tone the plot down to comply with guidelines. The surrogacy saga puts pressure on Libby and Dan's marriage and it falls apart. Valentine drew on her own experience of going through a divorce to film the scenes. She revealed that she was "really really proud" of how they portrayed the end of Libby and Dan's marriage and she said that she put her "heart and soul" into the storyline. She added "It was the most intimate storyline I've ever done in my life. I got the chance to really exorcise some demons."

=== Second departure and returns ===
In 2010, Valentine took three months off from Neighbours due to ill health. In July of that year, she spent a week in hospital with a lung problem and in December she checked herself into a clinic as she was suffering from exhaustion. Valentine said "I'm very grateful to the producers for allowing me time off to get healthy again and this year is already looking fantastic." Valentine returned to the set in January 2011.

A few months after her return to filming, Valentine took indefinite leave from Neighbours. Fiona Byrne of the Herald Sun reported the actress was undergoing treatment in hospital for a depressive illness. Susan Bower said Valentine had the support of the production team and her character would be written out of the show in a "nice and neat way." Byrne added "It has been done so when she is ready to return she (Libby) can walk straight back into the show." Byrne's colleague, Luke Dennehy reported Valentine's contract was up for renewal at the end of 2011. In September 2011, Byrne said Valentine was unlikely to return to Neighbours, though this was not confirmed by the show.

On 11 March 2014, it was announced that Valentine would be returning to Neighbours as part of a storyline to celebrate 20 years of Karl and Susan Kennedy. Valentine's return came a few months after she filed a complaint against FremantleMedia. She told Sarah Thomas from The Sydney Morning Herald, "I'm really looking forward to catching up with old friends at Neighbours as well as getting to know many of the new cast. Playing Libby was a very important part of my life and I can't wait to reintroduce audiences to her." Libby returned on 11 June 2014.

Valentine reprised the role for a cameo appearance in the show's then-final episode, which was broadcast on 28 July 2022.

== Storylines ==
=== 1994–2005 ===
Following her arrival, Libby meets Brett Stark (Brett Blewitt) and they become best friends. Brett later forms a crush on her. Libby gets a part-time job at Philip Martin's (Ian Rawlings) newsagent. When she is threatened by a thief, Karl is convinced the job is not safe, but she goes back to work there. She leaves for a cadetship at the Erinsborough News. Libby develops a crush on Luke Handley (Bernard Curry) and he begins to develop feelings for her too. They share a kiss, but Karl is disapproving of the relationship and Luke is uncomfortable with the age difference. Luke then tells Libby that they can only be friends. Libby begins a relationship with Sonny Hammond (Tom Hutchings), but she grows uncomfortable when Sonny wants to take things further. After breaking up with him, Libby and Brett lose their virginity to each other. Despite feeling awkward, they both agree that it was the right thing to do. Brett leaves to go travelling and he gives his pet Galah, Dahl, to Libby.

Brett's older brother, Darren, moves to Ramsay Street and Libby begins a relationship with him. Darren cheats on Libby with Catherine O'Brien (Radha Mitchell) and Libby is upset by Darren's betrayal. Darren decides to leave Erinsborough, but stays when Libby tells him she loves him. However, he later kisses another woman and Libby ends their relationship for good. Drew Kirk (Dan Paris) moves to the town shortly after Darren leaves and falls in love with Libby. Libby is initially oblivious to Drew's love for her and she begins dating her university lecturer, Mike Healy (Andrew Blackman). Libby and Mike's relationship upsets her parents as he is much older than her and recently separated from his wife. Libby continues seeing Mike until he starts dating his wife again. Libby and Drew eventually start a relationship and Libby becomes good friends with new neighbour, Stephanie Scully (Carla Bonner). Drew proposes to Libby and she accepts, but weeks before the wedding, Libby and Steph are involved in a motorbike accident. Libby is told that she would never carry a baby to full term as a result of her injuries. Libby pushes Drew away, but they eventually reconcile and they marry. Libby then finds out that she is pregnant and decides to keep the baby despite the risks to her life. Libby goes into labour whilst locked inside a barn at a rodeo in Oakey. When she is found, she is taken to the hospital and she gives birth to Ben (Noah Sutherland). Just a year later, Drew dies after being thrown from a horse leaving Libby devastated.

Libby becomes a teacher at Erinsborough High. She helps Taj Coppin (Jaime Robbie Reyne) with his assignments and he develops a crush on her. When Taj turns eighteen, he pursues Libby but she ignores him. When he offers to walk her home one night, Taj invites Libby to his house and they sleep together. Libby goes away for a while and Taj realises that they cannot have a relationship and leaves Erinsborough. Libby is offered a teaching job in Adelaide and she accepts and moves away. When Karl and Susan split up, following Karl's relationship with Izzy Hoyland (Natalie Bassingthwaighte), Libby returns home. Libby is shocked to see Darren working as an electrician and is impressed that Darren has matured and gets on well with Ben (now Sean Berends). They start their relationship again and Libby and Ben move to Shepparton with him.

=== 2007–2022 ===
Libby and Ben (now Blake O'Leary) return to Erinsborough for a short stay, but when Susan is diagnosed with multiple sclerosis, Libby decides to move back home. Libby is questioned about Darren, but she avoids talking about him and attacks Karl about his past infidelity. Darren arrives in Ramsay Street and reveals that he cheated on Libby. Darren tries to reconcile with Libby, but she insists that their relationship is over. Darren then kisses Janae Timmins, which ends his relationship with Libby for good and he returns to Shepparton alone.

Libby returns to teaching at Erinsborough High and she develops feelings for Daniel Fitzgerald. They begin dating, but Libby calls the relationship off when Dan's estranged wife, Samantha (Simone Buchanan), arrives in town. Dan asks Sam for a divorce, but Libby refuses to get involved with him. Libby and Ben move in with Steph and Libby begins a relationship with Lucas Fitzgerald (Scott Major), not knowing that he is Dan's brother. When she finds out the truth, she cuts both men out of her life. Libby and Dan both go for the job of Head of Senior School, but Libby forgets her notes during her interview. Dan gets the job, but turns it down after hearing about what happened to Libby. Dan then tells Libby that he loves her and they begin dating. Dan moves in with Libby and Ben, he later proposes and Libby accepts. Samantha returns and announces she is pregnant with Dan's child. Libby calls off the wedding and she accuses Sam of using her pregnancy to try to win Dan back. Steph tells Libby and Dan that she overheard Sam talking about the baby and that Dan is not the father. Sam admits the truth, before leaving once more. On the day of her wedding, Libby begins to feel unwell, but manages to get through the ceremony. However, she collapses and is rushed to hospital, where she finds out she is pregnant. Libby believes the baby is a girl and she and Dan decide to name her Grace after Susan's mother. Libby later loses the baby and when she begins hemorrhaging, Dan gives his permission for the doctors to perform a hysterectomy.

Libby suggests trying surrogacy to have a baby. Steph initially offers to carry the baby, but Libby turns her down and Susan offers instead. Libby and Dan accept and Susan later becomes pregnant. Dan begins to question Susan's interference in his and Libby's lives. Karl tries to defuse the situation by taking them on a break, so they can talk. Dan and Susan argue and Dan announces that he should never have agreed to the surrogacy, upsetting Libby. Libby and Karl later find Susan, following a fall, and rush her to hospital, where she miscarries the baby. Libby blames Dan for the loss of their child and she ends their marriage. Dan leaves Ramsay Street without saying goodbye, to Libby's shock and confusion, and she and Ben move back in with Susan and Karl. Libby meets Doug Harris (Mahesh Jadu) at Ben's dance class and they initially get off to a bad start, but begin dating. Libby is unaware that Doug is Karl's boss, until he takes a phone call from him. Karl later walks in on Libby and Doug kissing.

Libby is shocked to find out that Steph and Toadfish Rebecchi (Ryan Moloney) are back together and that Steph is pregnant. Libby finds it hard knowing her best friend is pregnant. She clashes with the new school principal, Michael Williams (Sandy Winton), over some of his ideas for the school. Libby acts as bridesmaid for Steph and Toadie's wedding. Libby is shocked to learn that Dan has been injured in an accident and is not happy that Steph and Toadie tried to keep it from her. Paul Robinson (Stefan Dennis) plays a recording of a conversation between Steph and Dan over the radio where she confesses he is the actual father of her child, which Libby hears. Finally realizing why Dan abruptly left the street, Libby tells Steph that they are no longer friends. Toadie reveals his part in covering up the secret, which devastates Libby further. She later splits up with Doug following an argument. Libby and Lucas sleep together, but agree to keep things casual between them. Ben is accepted into an arts boarding school and Libby finds it hard to let him go. Libby makes up with Toadie, but tells him that she cannot do the same with Steph. After Lyn Scully (Janet Andrewartha) reveals her concerns over Steph's mental state, Libby decides to go and find her. She tracks her down to a motel and they talk. Steph gets angry and races off on her motorbike and accidentally kills Ringo Brown (Sam Clark). Libby helps Steph realise that she is suffering from postpartum depression and goes to the hospital with her to talk to Doug. Libby is shocked to see Sam back in town for Steph's trial. Karl and Susan discover that Libby is prepared to lie about Steph's state of mind at the time of the accident and they beg her to tell the truth. Libby gives her evidence in court, but Sam exposes her lies. Steph is sent to prison for six years, which shocks Libby. She then decides to visit Ben.

After attending a health retreat, Libby returns to Ramsay Street. She defuses an argument between Susan and Lyn and then comforts Toadie. Karl and Susan believe Libby's new attitude to life is just a phase, which she denies. Paul tries to get Libby to support his bid to join the school board. Libby draws up a five-year plan, which includes her becoming principal. Libby later supports Michael's no uniform policy and she tells Paul that it will fail. Libby then accepts Michael's offer of mentorship. Karl tries to set Libby up with Jonathan Swan (Gary Abrahams), a doctor who works at the hospital with him. After her first mentoring session with Michael does not go well, Libby leaves to visit Ben indefinitely.

Three years later, Libby returns to Erinsborough with Ben (now Felix Mallard), when Susan asks her to become acting deputy principal of Erinsborough High for three weeks. Libby goes to see Paul to express her condolences over his niece Kate Ramsay's (Ashleigh Brewer) death. She then offers him some advice about how to cope with his loss. When Susan falls ill, Libby becomes acting principal and has to cope with several problems on her first day. When Ben gets into a fight with another student, Libby has to suspend him. Libby realises that Karl and Susan want her to come back home permanently and she is angry when she learns that they have tried to trick her. Karl and Susan apologise, and Libby admits that she has enjoyed being back in Erinsborough. Ben later tells Libby that he wants to leave as everywhere reminds him of Drew. Libby and Ben decide to go to Oakey to get to know Drew's roots, before going home to Ballarat.

Eight years later, Libby sends Toadie a video message congratulating him on his wedding to Melanie Pearson (Lucinda Cowden).

== Other appearances ==
In 2005, four novellas based on characters from Neighbours were released. The books were available to buy at some Australia Post outlets and on the internet. Libby and Darren Stark were the focus of one of the books entitled Facing Tomorrow. It explains what happened after the couple left Erinsborough in 2004 and followed their new life together. Of the books, a spokeswoman said "It's different to what happens in the show; it's more like a fantasy of what happens, might have happened, in the show, they would take about an hour to read if you're a quick reader".

== Reception ==
For her portrayal of Libby, Valentine has earned various awards nominations. In 2008, she was nominated for Sexiest Female at the Inside Soap Awards. The following year she received a nomination for Best Actress and in 2010 was nominated for Best Daytime Star. Libby and Susan's surrogacy storyline was nominated for Best Baby Drama at the 2010 All About Soap Bubble Awards. In June 2002, Libby came third in a poll run by Newsround to find viewer's favourite Neighbours character. She received 19.33% of the vote.

In January 2009, Ruth Deller, of television website Lowculture included Libby in her monthly list of best and worst soap characters. Libby was placed at number ten on the worst characters list. Deller said "Libby's always had the tendency to be a bit smug and self-absorbed, but she's taking it to ridiculous levels at the moment. And her and Fitzy (or her and Lucas) is clearly a wrong thing indeed". Virgin Media compiled a list of their sexiest soap couples, Libby and Dan were featured and they stated that they believed the couple were a "match made in soap heaven" and that "nothing can stand in the way of their love apart from Sam". Soap opera reporting website Holy Soap opined that Libby's most memorable moment was collapsing at her wedding, finding out she was pregnant and subsequently losing the baby.

To celebrate Neighbours' 25th anniversary Sky, a British satellite broadcasting company profiled 25 characters of which they believed were the most memorable in the series history. Libby is in the list and describing her they state: "When Libby first joined the programme, she seemed to spend most of her time trying to out-do Ruth Wilkinson in the ugly short-wearing stakes. Then she got all curvy sexy, and as an adult Libby has seen three of the hottest Ds in the Greater Erinsborough area: Darren, Drew and Dan. Her feisty newshound days are long behind her too as she's become a teacher, which apparently in Australia requires no formal training. Interesting."

British newspaper, The Guardian, included Libby in a feature called "Soaps' most bizarre recasts". Of the character's temporary recast, they said "A staple of Neighbours since 1994, we've watched Libby Kennedy get married, get widowed, get married again, get divorced and – for one confusing month – turn into a completely different person. They added that the recast was the "most confusing Neighbours moment since that time Bouncer got married in his dreams". British weekly magazine NOW compiled a special gallery to decide whether Libby was best played by Valentine or Banas. They describe Libby has never having any luck in her love life and since Drew's death has been doomed it's got worse. TV Week ran a poll asking their readers to give their opinions on Banas playing Libby temporarily. 49 per cent of readers voted "it's been weird", 27 per cent decided "it's been better" and the remaining 24 per cent felt "it's made no difference." In 2014, Matt Bramford from What to Watch put Libby on his list of the 18 best recastings in British and Australian soap operas, calling it "probably the weirdest soap recast ever".

In June 2014, Kerry Barrett from All About Soap was pleased to see Libby return, saying "We were just as thrilled as the Kennedys were to see lovely Lib back in Erinsborough. And when Karl asked if she had anything to go home to, we thought how brilliant it would be if she stayed." Libby was placed at number thirty-four on the Huffpost's "35 greatest Neighbours characters of all time" feature. Journalist Adam Beresford branded her "the classic girl next door" type who was "principled, driven and kinda self-righteous." In 2016, Katie Baillie writing for Metro included Libby on a list of the "worst Neighbours characters" ever. She stated that Libby was dubbed "saint Libby" by viewers, owing to her "judgemental and self-righteous attitude" despite romancing a student. Baillie also criticised her for constantly moving home as an adult. In 2015, a Herald Sun reporter included Libby and Steph's bike accident in their "Neighbours' 30 most memorable moments" feature.
