= Nicola Charles =

British-born Australian author and actress

- Born: 22 December 1969 (age 56); Worcestershire, England
- Occupations: Actress, model, entrepreneur, author
- Spouse(s): Sean Cochrane (m. 1993; div. 1994) Jason Barry (m. 2003; div. 2008) Mark Tabberner (m. 2012)
- Children: 3

Nicola Charles (born 22 December 1969) is a British-Australian actress, author, and conspiracy theorist. She is known for her role as Sarah Beaumont in the Australian soap opera Neighbours.

== Early life ==
Nicola Charles was born and raised in Worcestershire, England, around 1970, to a microbiologist and professional racer. She moved to London in 1987.

== Acting career ==
Charles started her career in British television commercials, having been chosen as the face to launch Coca-Cola's new flagship brand Sprite. She continued in commercials and modelling work for brands including Oil of Ulay and Häagen-Dazs.

After moving to Australia in the mid-1990s with then boyfriend Scott Michaelson, she landed her first acting role. Having turned up at Grundy Television studios auditioning for game show The Price is Right, Charles was noticed by casting director Jan Russ and invited to read for a part on Neighbours, and was offered the role of Sarah Beaumont.

Charles left Neighbours in 1999. She made her feature film debut in the 2000 black comedy Muggers, playing the small role of Belinda.

In 2009, she had a supporting role in the 2011 comedy film For Christ's Sake.

Charles returned to Melbourne in early 2012, and in 2013 reprised her role in Neighbours.

== Other activities ==
In 2001, Charles finished writing and recording an album called Listening in Color in London. The album was mixed by prominent sound engineer Chris Lord-Alge in Los Angeles, but not released by Mushroom Records UK.

Charles has penned two novels, Click Monkey: Who Do You Trust with Your Kids? (2019), and The Witches of Toorak (2020). In July 2020 Charles bought the publisher of her books, Shield-Maiden Publishing, becoming CEO and sole owner.

She became known as a conspiracy theorist during the COVID-19 pandemic, calling herself "The White Rabbit". In the lead-up to the 2023 Australian Indigenous Voice referendum, she created a video falsely claiming that the establishment of the Voice would lead to the UN taking over land in Australia, appointing "one man and one woman in every district".

She was a candidate for The Great Australian Party in the 2025 Australian federal election.

== Personal life ==
Charles was engaged to model Dan Travers. She married kickboxing champion and model Sean Cochrane ten days after meeting him in March 1993, but the marriage ended four months later and they divorced in 1994.

Charles married her Muggers co-star Jason Barry in August 2003, and they relocated to Los Angeles, so Barry could pursue his acting career. They have two daughters. Charles and Barry divorced in 2008.

On 1 June 2012, Charles married DJ Mark Tabberner in Caulfield. Charles and Tabberner have a son.

== Filmography ==
| Year | Title | Role | Notes |
|---|---|---|---|
| 1996–1999, 2005, 2013, 2016 | Neighbours | Sarah Beaumont | Series regular |
| 2000 | Muggers | Belinda | Feature film |
| 2009 | For Christ's Sake | Mary Murphy | Feature film |

== Writer ==
| Year | Title | Publisher |
|---|---|---|
| 2019 | Click Monkey: Who Do You Trust with Your Kids? | Shield-Maiden Publishing |
| 2020 | The Witches of Toorak | Shield-Maiden Publishing |
| 2021 | Soap Star | Shield-Maiden Publishing |

== Discography ==
| Year | Title | Type | Status |
|---|---|---|---|
| 2001 | Listening in Colour | Album | Unreleased |
