= Final =

Final, Finals or The Final may refer to:

- Final examination or finals, a test given at the end of a course of study or training
- Final (competition), the last or championship round of a sporting competition, match, game, or other contest which decides a winner for an event
  - Another term for playoffs, describing a sequence of contests taking place after a regular season or round-robin tournament, culminating in a final by the first definition.

== Art and entertainment ==
- Finals (comics), a four-issue comic book mini-series
- The Finals, a first-person shooter game

=== Film and television ===
- Final (film), a science fiction film
- The Final (film), a thriller film
- Finals (film), a 2019 Malayalam sports drama film
- "Finals" (Doctor in the House), a 1970 television episode

=== Music ===
- Final, a tone of the Gregorian mode
- Final (band), an English electronic musical group
- Final (Vol. 1), 2021 album by Enrique Iglesias
  - Final (Vol. 2), 2024 album by Enrique Iglesias
- The Final (album), by Wham!
- "The Final", a song by Dir en grey on the album Withering to Death

== Other uses ==
- Final case, a grammatical case
- Part of a syllable
- NBA Finals, the championship competition of the National Basketball Association, known as "The Finals" from 2003 until 2017.
- final (Java) and final (C++), keywords in the Java and C++ programming languages

== See also ==
- Final approach (disambiguation)
- Finale (disambiguation)
- Finality
- Finally (disambiguation)
- Ending (disambiguation)
- End (disambiguation)
