= Approach =

Approach may refer to:

== Aviation ==
- Visual approach
- Instrument approach
- Final approach

== Music ==
- Approach (album), by Von Hertzen Brothers
- The Approach, an album by I:Scintilla

== Other uses ==
- Approach Beach, a gazetted beach in Ting Kau, Hong Kong
- Approach shot (disambiguation)
- Lotus Approach, a database
- Bridge approach
- Approaches to scientific method
- Bowling action in the sport of cricket
- Flirting

== See also ==
- Capability approach, in economic theory
- Final approach (disambiguation)
