= Finally =

Finally may refer to:

== Albums ==
- Finally (Namie Amuro album) (2017)
- Finally!, a 2024 album by The Aquabats
- Finally (Blackstreet album) or its title song
- Finally (Sean Ensign album) or its title song "It's My Life (Finally)"
- Finally (Layzie Bone & A.K. album) (2008)
- Finally... (EP), a 1996 EP by Low
- Finally... (album), a 2002 album by One True Thing
- Finally (CeCe Peniston album) or its title song
- Finally! (T. G. Sheppard album) (1982)
- Finally (Velvet album) (2006)
- Finally!, a 2008 album by Iya Villania
- ...finally, a 1996 album by Too Much Joy

== Songs ==
- "Finally" (CeCe Peniston song) (1991)
- "Finally" (D'banj song) (2013)
- "Finally" (Fergie song) (2008)
- "Finally" (Kings of Tomorrow song) (2001)
- "Finally" (T.G. Sheppard song) (1982)
- "Finally", a song by the Frames from Burn the Maps
- "Finally", a song by Joyner Lucas from ADHD
- "Finally", a song by Mamamoo from Purple
- "Finally", a song by M.I.A. from AIM
- "Finally", a song by Yes from The Ladder
- "Finally", a 2019 single by Thabsie
- "Finally", a 2023 single by Jonas Blue and Rani

== Other uses ==
- Finally (company), an American light bulb company
- Finally (film), a 1991 documentary about Eric Burdon
- Finally, a keyword in exception handling syntax

== See also ==
- Final (disambiguation)
- Finale (disambiguation)
- Finally, Betty Carter, a 1976 album by Betty Carter
- Finally Karen, a 1997 album by Karen Clark Sheard
