= Finality =

Concept of things having a definitive end

Finality is the concept of things having a definitive end. There are a number of different philosophical and functional views of the concept.

== Intrinsic and extrinsic finality ==
Intrinsic finality is the idea that there is a natural good for all beings, and that all beings have a natural tendency to pursue their own good. It is an underlying principle of both teleology and moral objectivism. The concept was summarized by Thomas Aquinas as follows:

By the form which gives it its specific perfection, everything in nature has an inclination to its own operations and to its own end, which it reaches through these operations. Just as everything is, such also are its operations and its tendency to what is suitable to itself.

The idea of intrinsic finality presumes an objective reality that obeys a natural order or natural law in the universe. Things are meant to be and behave a certain way, and naturally tend to act that way. For instance, animals have natural instincts for self-preservation, seeking food, and reproduction. They do so because it is their nature to do so. Theologians go further, to argue that they do so because they were created to do so.

The existence of such a finality is often challenged, particularly by philosophers ascribing to philosophical naturalism. They argue that it is unreasonable to say that all beings naturally pursue their own benefit, when some beings clearly do not. They point to instances of imperfection, disease, and death as evidence that natural beings do not naturally move toward perfection. But proponents of intrinsic finality respond that the very recognition of such imperfection requires an ideal or standard of the perfect end from which the being in question falls short owing to a variety of factors including improper education, sin, or predestination.

Intrinsic finality provides the basis for the teleological argument for the existence of God and its modern counterpart, intelligent design. Proponents of teleology argue that Darwinism does not resolve a fundamental defect in philosophical naturalism; that it focuses exclusively on the immediate causes and mechanisms of events and does not attend to the reason for their synthesis.

Naturalists respond that biology has been profoundly concerned with the ways function constrains structure since the time of Aristotle and that Darwin's own awareness of teleology is evident in his study in functional constraints on the evolutionary development of the beaks of Galapagos finches, of which he wrote, "Seeing this gradation and diversity of structure in one small, intimately related group of birds, one might really fancy that from an original paucity of birds in this archipelago, one species had been taken and modified for different ends." (Origin of Species, chapter 19)

Extrinsic finality is a principle of the philosophy of teleology that holds that a being has a final cause or purpose external to that being itself, in contrast to an intrinsic finality, or self-contained purpose. One example is the view that minerals are "designed" to be used by plants that are in turn "designed" to be used by animals.

Overemphasizing extrinsic finality is often criticized as leading to the anthropic attribution of every event to a divine purpose, or superstition. For instance, "If I hadn't been at the store today, I wouldn't have found that $100 on the ground. God must have intended for me to go to the store so I would find that money." or "We won the game today because of my lucky socks." Such abuses were criticized by Francis Bacon, Descartes, and Spinoza.

== Application to law ==
In law, finality is the concept that certain disputes must achieve a resolution from which no further appeal may be taken and from which no collateral proceedings may be permitted to disturb that resolution. For example, in some jurisdictions, such as the state of New York, those convicted of a crime may not sue their defence attorney for incompetence or legal malpractice if the civil lawsuit would call into question the finality of the criminal conviction.

Finality is crucial because otherwise, there would be no certainty as to the meaning of the law or the outcome of any legal process. The principle is an aspect of the separation of powers, a distinction between the executive and the judicial power. That concept was defined in Kable v Director of Public Prosecutions (NSW) in which a court stated that unless orders were valid until set aside, "the exercise of judicial power could yield no adjudication of right and liability to which immediate effect could be given". The importance of finality is the source of the concept of res judicata: the decisions of one court are settled law and may not be retried in another case brought in a different court.

== See also ==
- Final (disambiguation)
- Finale (disambiguation)
- Finiteness
- Teleology
