= John Goscha =

American inventor and entrepreneur (born 1984)

- Born: John Ross Goscha; 1984 (age 41–42); Littleton, Colorado
- Education: Babson College B.S.
- Occupations: Founder and CEO, The Finally Light Bulb Company
- Years active: 2002–present
- Known for: IdeaPaint

John Goscha (born 1984) is an American inventor and entrepreneur. He is the founder of companies such as IdeaPaint and Finally Light Bulb Company. In 2020, he founded Native Voice, an on-demand voice assistant library that aims to deliver multi-voice connectivity accessible across all owned products.

== Early life ==
Goscha was born in 1984 in Littleton, Colorado. He graduated from Regis Jesuit High School in Aurora, Colorado in 2002 and earned a B.S. in Economics and Entrepreneurship from Babson College in Wellesley, Massachusetts in 2006.

== Career ==
Goscha's entrepreneurship began when he was sixteen years old, launching a website that sold custom golf clubs. As an undergraduate at Babson College, Goscha founded IdeaPaint and was able to secure funding for its production as well as expand distribution into stores such as Lowe's.

In 2012, John founded Finally Light Bulb Company, a company that has engineered a lighting technology that replicates all the attributes of incandescent technology while using 75% less energy. It is an adaptation of induction lighting that has been miniaturized to fit inside a standard light bulb form. It is an adaptation of induction lighting that has been miniaturized to fit inside a standard light bulb form.

In 2020, He founded Native Voice. The company raised $14 million from investors in seed funding to build an on-demand voice assistant library that enables users to communicate directly with various brands via voice.

John also serves on the Education and Awareness Council of For All Moonkind, Inc., a nonprofit organization committed to developing the legal framework to protect and manage human cultural heritage in outer space.

== Awards and recognition ==
In 2009, Goscha was named to Inc.'s "30 Under 30" list and was named one of America's Best Young Entrepreneurs by Businessweek. Goscha was also named to Forbes' "30 Under 30" list for Technology in 2011.
