= The Steph Show =

- Starring: Stephanie McIntosh
- Country of origin: Australia
- No. of episodes: 8

Production
- Production locations: Sydney, Australia
- Running time: 22 minutes

Original release
- Network: Network 10
- Release: 28 July – 15 September 2006

The Steph Show is an Australian reality television series starring singer and actress Stephanie McIntosh. The show premiered on Australian TV at 6 pm 28 July 2006 on Network Ten. The show, in the same vein as The Ashlee Simpson Show, had cameras following McIntosh as she recorded her debut album Tightrope which was released on 9 September 2006. The first single "Mistake" was released the day after the season premiere. The theme song is "Tightrope" by Stephanie McIntosh. The last episode is to coincide with the release of "Tightrope".

The final show was aired on 15 September 2006. The finale included McIntosh shooting the music video for "Tightrope".
