= So Do I Say Sorry First? =

2007 single by Stephanie McIntosh

Single by Stephanie McIntosh

from the album Tightrope
- Released: 5 March 2007
- Recorded: 2006
- Studio: Metropolis (Melbourne)
- Label: Universal
- Songwriter(s): Klaus Derendorf; McIntosh; Tom Nichols
- Producer(s): Derendorf; Nichols

Stephanie McIntosh singles chronology
"Tightrope" (2006)	"So Do I Say Sorry First?" (2007)	"Catching My Breath" (2007)

Audio video
- "So Do I Say Sorry First?" on YouTube

"So Do I Say Sorry First?" is a song written by Klaus Derendorf, Stephanie McIntosh and Tom Nichols, produced by Derendorf and Nichols for McIntosh's debut album, Tightrope (2006). It was released as the album's third single on 5 March 2007 in Australia. The track was co-written by McIntosh herself and it is the only track on her album written by her.

McIntosh performed the song live on stage in the Australia MTV Music Awards. The performance was received poorly by the audience which resulted in McIntosh running off stage straight after the performance.

== Music video ==
The music video for "So Do I Say Sorry First?" was directed by Anthony Rose and was released on 15 January 2007. It features McIntosh sitting a driving test with a "geeky" instructor but driving extremely fast and driving in a stunt style and knocking over cones. It also has McIntosh singing in a stage setting at various points in the video. The video ends with McIntosh crashing the car and walking away from the scene.

== Track listings ==
Australian CD single

1. "So Do I Say Sorry First?" (vocal up version) – 2:56
2. "So Do I Say Sorry First?" (Steve Mac electrik disko mix) – 6:06
3. "So Do I Say Sorry First?" (Steve Mac electrik disko instrumental dub) – 6:06

UK digital download

1. "So Do I Say Sorry First?" (vocal up version) – 2:56
2. "So Do I Say Sorry First?" (Steve Mac electrik disko mix) – 6:06

== Charts ==
=== Weekly charts ===
Chart (2007)	Peak position
Australia (ARIA)	34

== Release details ==
Country	Date	Label	Format	Catalog	Ref.
Australia	5 March 2007	Universal	CD	1720689	
