= The Finale =

The Finale may refer to:

- "The Finale" (Everybody Loves Raymond), the final episode of Everybody Loves Raymond
- "The Finale" (Seinfeld), the final two episodes of Seinfeld
- "The Finale" (What We Do in the Shadows), the series finale of What We Do in the Shadows
- "The Finale" (Will & Grace), the final episode of Will & Grace
- "The Finale", the final episode of The Nanny
- "The Finale", the final episode of The Big C
- "The Finale", a song by Jolin Tsai from the 2006 album Dancing Diva

== See also ==
- Finale (disambiguation)
