= Finale =

Finale may refer to:

== Pieces of music ==
- Finale (music), the last movement of a piece
- Finale (Loggins and Messina album), 1977
- Finale (Pierrot album), 1999
- "Finale" (song), by Madeon
- "Neo Universe/Finale", a single by L'Arc-en-Ciel
- "Finale", a song by AJR from their album Neotheater
- "Finale", a song by Anthrax from State of Euphoria
- "Finale", a song by Bikini Kill from Reject All American
- "Finale", a piece of film music by John Williams from Harry Potter and the Prisoner of Azkaban
- "Finale", a song by Patrick Wolf from The Magic Position
- "Finale", a track from the soundtrack of the 2015 video game Undertale by Toby Fox
- "Finale", song by Funeral Party from The Golden Age of Knowhere
- "Finale", a song from the musical In the Heights
- "Finale B", a 1996 song from the rock opera Rent

== Places ==
- Finale Emilia, a municipality in Emilia-Romagna, Italy
- Finale Ligure, a municipality in Liguria, Italy

== Television ==
- Finale (Everybody Loves Raymond), the series finale of American sitcom Everybody Loves Raymond
- "Finale" (Modern Family), the series finale of American sitcom Modern Family
- Finale (Neighbours), the series finale of Australian soap opera Neighbours
- "Finale" (The Office), the series finale of American edition of The Office
- "Finale" (Skins series 6), the series finale of the sixth series of the British teen drama Skins
- Finale (Smallville)
- Season finale, the last episode of a single season of a television show
- Series finale, the last episode of a television show

== Other uses ==
- Finale (novel), a 2012 novel by Becca Fitzpatrick
- Finale (film), a 2009 film
- Finale (software), music notation software

== See also ==
- The Finale (disambiguation)
- Final (disambiguation)
- Finally (disambiguation)
