= Tightrope (Stephanie McIntosh album) =

Studio album by Stephanie McIntosh
- Released: 11 September 2006
- Recorded: 2004–2006
- Genre: Pop
- Length: 45:40
- Label: Universal
- Producer: Tom Nichols, Rami Yacoub, Carl Falk, Peter Zizzo, Greg Kurstin, Klaus Derendorf

Alternative cover
- Cover of the album released in the UK.

Singles from Tightrope
- 1. "Mistake" Released: 31 July 2006; 2. "Tightrope" Released: 21 October 2006; 3. "So Do I Say Sorry First?" Released: 3 March 2007

Tightrope is the debut album from Australian pop singer Stephanie McIntosh, which was released on 11 September 2006, and re-released on 19 March 2007. It was released to the UK on 20 August 2007 with an alternate track listing and cover, but some Australian editions of the album have been seen in UK music stores such as HMV.

== History ==
McIntosh worked on her debut album with award-winning songwriter/producer Tom Nichols, who has written and produced songs for the likes of Jessica Simpson, Lindsay Lohan, Alistair Griffin, Kylie Minogue, S Club 7 and Atomic Kitten.

Nichols has co-written and produced McIntosh's debut album along with Rami, Greg Kurstin, Klaus Derendorf and Guy Roche. The writing and recording process found McIntosh travelling all over the world to studios in LA, London and Sweden along with her hometown of Melbourne. The album Tightrope was two years in the making, and McIntosh had a film crew following her around the world documenting the journey. The result was The Steph Show, which debuted on Channel 10 at 6pm on 28 July 2006.

The album features a cover of the song "Wishin' and Hopin'". McIntosh co-wrote one track on the album, "So Do I Say Sorry First?", which is a guitar-driven rock track. Most of Tightrope was recorded at the beginning of 2006. The album title, Tightrope, was decided by McIntosh and Nichols (producer/co-writer), with McIntosh saying "it's a cliché, but life can be like walking a tightrope sometimes".

On 5 September, the full album was available for play on Ninemsn music. The album leaked onto the internet on 6 September. It was assumed that it leaked because of the Ninemsn exclusive. Tightrope was re-released on 19 March 2007.

McIntosh arranged numerous radio interviews in the UK to promote Tightrope, which was released on 20 August 2007. However, it was supposed to be released earlier, on 2 July. During her promotion campaign, Tightrope debuted at number 40 on the UK Preorder Top 100 Albums chart and later on rose to its peak of number 11. Universal poorly promoted the album, and the first UK single "Mistake" debuted at number 168 on downloads alone reaching its peak a week later at number 47. The follow-up single, "So Do I Say Sorry First?", peaked at number 258.

== Critical reception ==
Reviews of the album were mixed, with Lizzie Ennever of the BBC wrote that "Steph’s voice isn’t bad, it’s just not very memorable or interesting" and that "[she sounds like] a good singer who’s been given a day in a recording studio as a present, rather than a future star in the making". However, tracks such as "So Do I Say Sorry First?" and "God Only Knows" were praised, the former being that "[it], in a kind of teen-angsty, 'rock out in your bedroom after a fight with your parents' way is pretty OK" and the latter being described as "going back to the rockier flavour of the opener, but again, it’s just not really very stimulating". In reference to the album overall, Ennever wrote: "if I had to sum Tightrope up in three words, they would be bland, boring and banal", also adding "I love Sky Mangel, I do not like Stephanie McIntosh the pop star".

Tony Bartholomew of Virgin Media's review was also negative, writing that "McIntosh has pedigree, as well as the prerequisite blonde hair, forgettable voice and complete lack of musical vision" saying that the album was "more Dannii Minogue than Kylie Minogue".

== Chart performance and singles ==
In Australia, the album entered at number four on the ARIA Albums Chart on the issue dated on 18 September 2006 and was the second-highest debut for that week. Next week it stayed at number four and was certified gold for shipping 35,000 copies. The album ended up spending fourteen weeks in the top one hundred, nine of which were in the top fifty, and became the 92nd-highest-selling album in 2006.

"Mistake" was the album's first single, released on 31 July 2006 in Australia. It made it to the top 3 on the ARIA Singles Chart and was certified Gold in Australia for sales of over 35,000. It was also her debut single in the UK and Ireland, but it did not get into the top 40 in either country. The second single, released only in Australia on 21 October 2006, was "Tightrope". Although it did not do as well on the charts as "Mistake", it did get into the top 20, peaking at number 16, and was certified gold. "So Do I Say Sorry First?" was released as the album's third Australian single on 3 March 2007. It was her weakest-selling single to date there, and it peaked at number 34. It was released in the United Kingdom as the second single as a download-only single on 6 August 2007.

== Track listing ==
Original release
No.	Title	Writer(s)	Producer(s)	Length
1.	"So Do I Say Sorry First?"	Klaus Derendorf, Stephanie McIntosh, Tom Nichols	Derendorf, Nichols	3:01
2.	"Mistake"	Arnthor Birgisson, Nichols, Rami Yacoub	Birgisson, Yacoub	3:20
3.	"Tightrope"	Greg Kurstin, Nichols	Kurstin, Nichols	3:19
4.	"You Should Have Lied"	Carl Falk, Savan Kotecha, Nichols	Falk, Nichols	3:30
5.	"Wishin' and Hopin'"	Burt Bacharach, Hal David	Nichols	3:20
6.	"Out in the Rain"	Charlie Grant, Nichols, Pete Woodroffe	Grant, Nichols, Woodroffe	3:26
7.	"You Don't Love Me"	Nichols, Quiz & Larossi	Quiz & Larossi	3:10
8.	"A Change Is Coming"	Nichols, Guy Roche	Nichols, Roche	4:03
9.	"God Only Knows"	Falk, Nichols	Falk, Nichols	2:59
10.	"Overcome"	Nichols, Peter Zizzo	Nichols, Zizzo	3:55
11.	"Sink like a Stone"	Derendorf, Jeeve, Nichols	Derendorf, Jeeve, Nichols	4:12
12.	"The Night of My Life"	Desmond Child, Nichols	Nichols	3:12
13.	"I'd Be You" (hidden track)	Nichols, Thom Pierce		3:08

Tightrope Australian repackaged release
No.	Title	Writer(s)	Producer(s)	Length
14.	"Catching My Breath"	Derendorf, Nichols, Laurent Proneur	Derendorf, Nichols	4:31
15.	"Mistake" (Jewels & Stone remix)	Birgisson, Nichols, Yacoub		6:06
16.	"Tightrope" (Black Fras extended remix)	Kurstin, Nichols		5:35
17.	"So Do I Say Sorry First?" (Steve Mac Electrik Disko mix)	Kurstin, Nichols		6:06

iTunes release
No.	Title	Writer(s)	Length
14.	"Mistake" (music video)	Birgisson, Nichols, Yacoub

UK edition
No.	Title	Writer(s)	Producer(s)	Length
1.	"So Do I Say Sorry First?"	Derendorf, McIntosh, Nichols	Derendorf, Nichols	3:01
2.	"Mistake"	Birgisson, Nichols, Yacoub	Birgisson, Yacoub	3:20
3.	"Tightrope"	Kurstin, Nichols	Kurstin, Nichols	3:19
4.	"You Should Have Lied"	Kotecha, Nichols, Falk	Falk, Nichols	3:30
5.	"Out in the Rain"	Grant, Nichols, Woodroffe	Grant, Nichols, Woodroffe	3:26
6.	"You Don't Love Me"	Nichols, Quiz & Larossi	Quiz & Larossi	3:10
7.	"A Change Is Coming"	Nichols, Roche	Nichols, Roche	4:03
8.	"God Only Knows"	Falk, Nichols	Falk, Nichols	2:59
9.	"Overcome"	Nichols, Zizzo	Nichols, Zizzo	3:55
10.	"Sink like a Stone"	Derendorf, Jeeve, Nichols	Derendorf, Jeeve, Nichols	4:12
11.	"The Night of My Life"	Child, Nichols	Nichols	3:12
12.	"Catching My Breath"	Derendorf, Nichols, Proneur	Derendorf, Nichols	4:31
13.	"I'd Be You" (hidden track)	Nichols, Thom Pierce		3:08

== Charts and certifications ==
=== Charts ===
Chart (2006)	Peak position
Australian Albums Chart	4

=== Certifications ===
Country	Certifications (sales thresholds)
Australia	Gold

=== Year-end charts ===
Chart (2006)	Peak position
Australian Albums Chart	92

== Release details ==
Country	Date	Label	Format	Catalog
Australia	11 September 2006	Universal Music	CD	1703889
Australia	19 March 2007	Universal Music	CD	1726345
United Kingdom	20 August 2007	UMTV	CD	1735817
