= Stephanie McIntosh =

Australian actress, singer and songwriter (born 1985)

- Born: 5 July 1985 (age 41); Sydney, Australia
- Occupations: Actress, singer, songwriter
- Years active: 1998–present
- Height: 1.66 m (5 ft 5 1/2 in)
- Children: 2
- Mother: Sue McIntosh
- Relatives: Jason Donovan (half-brother); Jemma Donovan (niece)
- Musical career
- Genres: Pop rock, power pop
- Instrument: Vocals
- Label: Universal

Stephanie McIntosh (born 5 July 1985) is an Australian actress, singer and songwriter. She played the role of Sky Mangel in the Australian soap opera Neighbours from 2003 to 2007. She made a brief appearance for one episode in 2015 as part of the show's 30th anniversary celebrations, and returned again in 2020 as part of the shows 35th anniversary episodes, and a cameo appearance in 2022 and 2024. As a singer, she released her debut album, Tightrope, in September 2006. It peaked at No. 4 on the ARIA Albums Chart.

== Early life and education ==
Stephanie McIntosh was born on 5 July 1985 and grew up in Sydney, Australia. Her father is John McIntosh and her mother is Sue McIntosh (née Menlove), a former TV actress and ABC newsreader. McIntosh has two older sisters, Katherine and Olivia. Her half-brother is actor and singer Jason Donovan from her mother's previous marriage to actor Terence Donovan.

McIntosh attended Firbank and then Melbourne Girls Grammar School, where she recalled "I involved myself in every play and every musical and I did drama classes." She left during Year 12 to start her acting career. As a teenager, she worked in a musical with stand-up comedian and part-time dancer, Tommy Dassalo.

== Career ==
=== 2001–2007: Acting career and Neighbours ===
McIntosh's acting debut was in the film The Wilde Girls (2001) as Carrie, alongside Olivia Newton-John. She followed this with a role on Australian children's television show The Legacy of the Silver Shadow (2002). In March 2003, McIntosh signed a three-year contract to appear in the Australian soap opera Neighbours. McIntosh joined the main cast as character Sky Mangel. Her half-brother, Jason Donovan, had also acted in Neighbours from 1986 to 1989. Growing up, she was neighbours with Alan Fletcher and was invited to the set by him, prior to acting alongside him. For McIntosh's performance in Neighbours, she was nominated for the "Most Popular New Female Talent" award at the 46th Annual TV Week Logie Awards held in 2004. She was also nominated for "Favorite Hottie" at the Nickelodeon Kids' Choice Awards. After filming over 500 episodes, she left Neighbours in April 2007 to focus on her singing career.

=== 2004–2007: Music career ===
McIntosh's music career began in 2004 when her version of the song "Santa Claus Is Coming to Town" was included on the album The Spirit of Christmas 2004. She recorded her debut demo single, "Happiest Day of My Life", in March 2005.

In April 2006, McIntosh signed a multi-album deal with Universal Music Australia.

The two years that McIntosh spent making the album was turned into a reality TV show The Steph Show, produced by Tom Nichols and Arnon Woolfson. The show debuted on Network Ten on 28 July 2006, the day before the release of her debut single, "Mistake", and finished on 15 September 2006, the date the music video for her second single Tightrope was released.

Her debut single, "Mistake", was released on 29 July 2006 and premiered on Australian radio on 26 June 2006. It debuted on the ARIA Charts at No. 3, and was certified Gold in August 2006, with shipments of over 35,000 units.

"Tightrope", the second single to be lifted off the album, made the Australian top 20. The album debuted and peaked at No. 4 on the ARIA Charts and at No. 1 on the Australasian Charts and was also accredited Gold.

The third single, written by McIntosh, "So Do I Say Sorry First?", was not as successful as her previous singles, peaking at number No. 34 on the ARIA Singles Chart.

A special re-packaged edition of the album Tightrope was released on 19 March 2007. At her appearance on Habbo Hotel on 8 March 2007 McIntosh confirmed that the re-packaged edition will feature remixes of the singles released from Tightrope as well as the bonus track "Catching My Breath". She also confirmed that a second season of The Steph Show was in the pipeline. In mid-May 2007, she released her demo single, "In My Skin". McIntosh was also nominated for "Spankin' New Artist" at the 2006 MTV Australia Video Music Awards, at which she also performed "So Do I Say Sorry First?"

McIntosh performed at university bars and nightclubs across the UK from September to November 2007 to build her popularity there.

=== 2008–present: Further acting roles ===
McIntosh was approached in 2008 to appear on Dancing with the Stars in Australia; however, she has not appeared in the series.

In May 2008, the Herald Sun reported that McIntosh had been in Los Angeles, meeting with potential agents and managers. She auditioned for roles in Transformers: Revenge of the Fallen (2009), the CBS mini-series Harper's Island, and Beverly Hills, 90210, but failed to secure them.

McIntosh appeared in the thriller Liars All (2013) as Casey Kass, and in Red Herring (2014) as Charlie, which co-starred former Neighbours castmate Holly Valance.

McIntosh reprised the role of Sky Mangel in Neighbours for one episode in 2015, as part of the show's 30th-anniversary celebrations. She was heavily pregnant at the time, and her return had initially been set up as a one-month role.

After a five-year acting career hiatus, McIntosh reprised her role on Neighbours as Sky Mangel on a recurring basis in 2020. Sky also appeared in the last-ever episode, broadcast on 29 July 2022, though McIntosh was not seen in the UK broadcast. She returned to Neighbours briefly on 3 July 2024.

== Personal life ==
In 2009 McIntosh ended her four and a half year relationship with AFL footballer Nick Riewoldt.

In March 2014, she began dating Peter Hieatt, a landscape designer. They have two daughters.

== Filmography ==
Year	Title	Character	Notes
2001	The Wilde Girls	Carrie	Guest role, alongside Olivia Newton-John
2002	Legacy of the Silver Shadow	Samantha	Guest role, TV series
2002	Short Cuts	Katie	TV series, appeared in 1 episode
2003–2007, 2015, 2020, 2022, 2024	Neighbours	Sky Mangel	TV series – regular role
2006	The Steph Show	Herself	Reality show
2010	My Dear	Mady	Short film
2012	Liars All	Casey Kass	Film
2014	Red Herring	Charlie	Film

== Awards and recognition ==
Year	Award-giving Body	Award	Result
2004	Logie Awards	Most Popular New Female Talent (Neighbours)	Nominated
2007	MTV Australia Awards	Spankin' New Artist (Tightrope)	Nominated

== Discography ==
=== Studio albums ===
List of studio albums, with selected chart positions and certifications
Title	Album details	Peak chart positions	Certifications
Title	Album details	AUS	Certifications
Tightrope	Released 9 September 2006 (Australia); Label: Universal Music; Formats: CD, digital download	4	ARIA: Gold

=== Singles ===
List of singles, with selected chart positions and certifications
Title	Year	Peak chart positions		Certifications	Album
Title	Year	AUS	UK	Certifications	Album
"Mistake"	2006	3	47	ARIA: Gold	Tightrope
"Tightrope"	2006	16	—		Tightrope
"So Do I Say Sorry First?"	2007	34	—		Tightrope
"Catching My Breath"	2007	—	—		Tightrope re-packaged
"—" denotes items which were not released in that country or failed to chart.

=== Music videos ===
List of music videos
Title	Year	Director
"Mistake"	2006	Anthony Rose
"Tightrope"	2006	Anthony Rose
"So Do I Say Sorry First?"	2007	Anthony Rose
