= Approach shot =

Approach shot may refer to:

- In racket sports, when a competitor places a shot while moving towards the net in sports such as:
  - Pickleball
  - Tennis
- Approach shot (golf), a shot intended to land on the green

== See also ==
- Approach (disambiguation)
