= Tightrope (Stephanie McIntosh song) =

Single by Stephanie McIntosh

from the album Tightrope
- Released: 21 October 2006 (Australia)
- Recorded: 2006
- Length: 3:03 (radio edit); 3:19 (album version)
- Label: Universal
- Songwriter(s): Greg Kurstin; Tom Nichols

Stephanie McIntosh singles chronology
"Mistake" (2006)	"Tightrope" (2006)	"So Do I Say Sorry First?" (2007)

Audio video
- "Tightrope" on YouTube

"Tightrope" is the second single from singer and actress, Stephanie McIntosh from the album of the same title, Tightrope. "Tightrope" was confirmed as the second single on The Steph Show. It was released on 21 October 2006 in Australia only, as due to poor sales of the album. Included with the single release are a set of free Habbo Hotel stickers.

== Music video ==
Tightrope was filmed in the second last week of August at Fox Studios in Sydney. It was directed by Anthony Rose who also directed "Mistake". The Steph Show had an exclusive behind the scenes preview of the video, and the video itself, which was aired on 15 September 2006.

The video begins with McIntosh in a bed, in a New York style apartment. She then looks out the window, and sees a man in the opposite apartment, and opens the window. She then questions herself as to whether she should go to him, but she steps on the ledge, and begins walking the tightrope to the man's apartment. As she reaches closer, he steps onto the ledge to help her into his room. She reaches the apartment, but falls off as she reaches the ledge. The man grabs her arm but can not lift her up, and she slips. He then jumps to save her. As they are about to hit the ground they embrace, McIntosh wakes from her dream.

== Formats and track listings ==
These are the formats and track listings of major single releases of "Tightrope".

Australian single

1. "Tightrope" – 3:03
2. "Tightrope" (Black Fras extended remix) – 5:35
3. "Tightrope" (acoustic mix) – 3:21

Official remixes

- "Tightrope" (acoustic mix) – 3:21
- "Tightrope" (Black Fras extended remix) – 5:35

== Chart performance ==
"Tightrope" debuted on the ARIA Digital Chart Track at #32. It also debuted at #44 on the Australian iTunes, and reached #2 on the ARIA Australasian Chart. It made its first official peak at #16 on the ARIA Charts, on 29 October 2006. The song only stayed on the Digital chart for one week giving it a much lower peak than McIntosh's previous single, "Mistake" which peaked at #3. It spent a total of nine weeks on the ARIA Top 50. It also helped to take the album from #29 to #26 when the single was released.

Chart (2006)	Peak position
Australia (ARIA)	16
