= Mistake (Stephanie McIntosh song) =

2006 single by Stephanie McIntosh

Single by Stephanie McIntosh

from the album Tightrope
- Released: 31 July 2006
- Length: 3:20
- Label: Universal
- Songwriters: Rami; Arnthor Birgisson; Tom Nichols
- Producers: Rami; Birgisson

Stephanie McIntosh singles chronology
| "Mistake" (2006) | "Tightrope" (2006) |

Audio video
- "Mistake" on YouTube

"Mistake" is a song by Australian actress Stephanie McIntosh. It was released as the first single from her debut album, Tightrope, on 31 July 2006. "Mistake" was written by Tom Nichols, Rami, and Arnthor Birgisson and produced by the latter two at Maratonem with mixing handled by Niklas Flycht. The original title for "Mistake" was "Another Mistake".

"Mistake" was released as the debut single from Tightrope in the UK and Ireland, where it was released on 25 June 2007 with McIntosh promoting the album there in June 2007. In its first week on the chart, "Mistake" entered the UK Singles Chart at number 168, on downloads alone. After its physical release, it jumped 121 places to number 47. It is McIntosh's highest-charting single inside and outside of Australia.

== Music video ==
The music video features Ryan Carnes, who acts on Desperate Housewives, a show of which McIntosh is a fan. It premiered on Video Hits on the morning of 1 July 2006, and it was available to view on her official website. McIntosh has said that the video clip took 18 hours of shooting.

The opening scene starts with McIntosh dumping her boyfriend and walking up to a house singing. Once she approaches the door, she knocks, and a man (Ryan Carnes) opens the door to let her in. After that, McIntosh begins to get ready for her catering job, and all the people arrive. McIntosh serves drinks as she sings but trips over. No one helps her up and everyone laughs except the man. She runs off to the bathroom and is almost in tears. She sings into the mirror and takes off her white shirt, revealing a green blondie T-shirt. The man walks in on her and they look at each other.

They then walk into the main party area with the man leading her to an unknown place. It is soon discovered that it is a stage, and McIntosh walks up and starts to sing. Everyone cheers her on and she gets into it. The ex-boyfriend comes in and she pours a drink all over him. Everyone laughs at him, and the scene ends with McIntosh smiling and biting her lip.

== Chart performance ==
"Mistake" debuted at number three on the Australian ARIA Singles Chart on 5 August 2006, becoming the highest debut of the week. "Mistake" was accredited gold by ARIA and was the 22nd-best-selling single of 2006 in Australia. It spent a total of 17 weeks on the ARIA Singles Chart. "Mistake" entered the UK Singles Chart on 24 June 2007 at number 168 on downloads alone, and after its physical release, it peaked at number 47 on 1 July 2007.

== Track listings ==
- Australian CD single
1. "Mistake" – 3:21
2. "Mistake" (Jewels & Stone remix) – 6:06
3. "Mistake" (Black Fras remix) – 4:23
- A free signed poster was included as a special bonus with all copies of the Australian edition of "Mistake".
- UK CD single
1. "Mistake" – 3:21
2. "Mistake" (Jewels & Stone remix) – 6:06

== Charts ==
=== Weekly charts ===
| Chart (2006–2007) | Peak position |
|---|---|
| Australia (ARIA) | 3 |
| UK Singles (OCC) | 47 |

=== Year-end charts ===
| Chart (2006) | Position |
|---|---|
| Australia (ARIA) | 22 |

== Certifications ==
| Region | Certification | Certified units/sales |
|---|---|---|
| Australia (ARIA) | Gold | 35,000^{^} |
^{^} Shipments figures based on certification alone.

== Release history ==
| Region | Date | Format | Label | Catalog | Ref. |
|---|---|---|---|---|---|
| Australia | 31 July 2006 | CD | Universal | 1703887 | |
| United Kingdom | 25 June 2007 | CD | Universal | 1739005 | |
