= Neighbours: The Finale =

- Neighbours episodes
- The final shot of the 90-minute version, showing the cast and crew on Ramsay Street.
- Episode nos.: Episodes 8901, 8902 and 8903
- Directed by: Scott Major
- Written by: Shane Isheev (8901); Jason Herbison (8902 and 8903)
- Cinematography by: Heath Kerr
- Editing by: Kylie Robertson
- Original air date: 28 July 2022
- Running time: 90 minutes

Guest appearance
- List of guest stars: Ian Smith as Harold Bishop; Peter O'Brien as Shane Ramsay; Natalie Bassingthwaighte as Isabelle Hoyland; Olympia Valance as Paige Smith; Benjamin McNair as Malcolm Kennedy; Scarlett Anderson as Nell Rebecchi; Zima Anderson as Roxy Willis; Morgan Baker as Callum Rebecchi; Melissa Bell as Lucy Robinson; Emerald Chan as Sadie Rodwell; Freya Van Dyke as Zara Selwyn; Jodi Gordon as Elly Conway; Henrietta Graham as Sam Young; Ben Turland as Hendrix Greyson; Olivia Junkeer as Yashvi Rebecchi; Paul Keane as Des Clarke; Candice Leask as Wendy Rodwell; James Mason as Chris Pappas; Chris Milligan as Kyle Canning; John Turner as Hugo Rebecchi; Lloyd Will as Andrew Rodwell; Guy Pearce as Mike Young; Kylie Minogue as Charlene Robinson; Jason Donovan as Scott Robinson; Margot Robbie as Donna Freedman; Natalie Imbruglia as Beth Brennan; Holly Valance as Felicity Scully; Daniel MacPherson as Joel Samuels; Delta Goodrem as Nina Tucker; Bonnie Anderson as Bea Nilsson; Lesley Baker as Angie Rebecchi; Juliet Basaraba as Abigail Tanaka; Andrew Bibby as Lance Wilkinson; Carla Bonner as Stephanie Scully; Nathan Borg as Curtis Perkins; Anne Charleston as Madge Bishop; Terence Donovan as Doug Willis; Jonathon Dutton as Tad Reeves; Mary Finn as Isla Tanaka-Brennan; Ben Hall as Ned Willis; Harlow Ireland as Annie Robinson; Kate Kendall as Lauren Turner; Mark Little as Joe Mangel; Blair McDonough as Stuart Parker; Stephanie McIntosh as Sky Mangel; Scott Major as Lucas Fitzgerald; Rob Mills as Finn Kelly; Eve Morey as Sonya Rebecchi; Jessica Muschamp as Sharon Davies; Morgana O'Reilly as Naomi Canning; Ian Rawlings as Philip Martin; Jesse Spencer as Billy Kennedy; Sally-Ann Upton as Vera Punt; Kym Valentine as Libby Kennedy

Episode chronology
← Previous; Episode 8900	Next → Episode 8904

"Neighbours: The Finale" comprises the 8901st, 8902nd and 8903rd episodes of the Australian television soap opera Neighbours. It premiered on 28 July 2022 on both Network 10 and 10 Peach in Australia, and on 29 July on Channel 5 in the United Kingdom. It was conceived as the end of the serial, after it was cancelled due to the loss of its UK broadcaster and failure to find an alternative buyer, and production ceased after it was filmed. The episodes were written by Shane Isheev (episode 8901) and executive producer Jason Herbison (episodes 8902 and 8903), and directed by Scott Major. Production on Neighbours ended on 10 June. Production and cast had known the show was facing cancellation since 2021 and ideas for a suitable finale were already being planned at that point. In response to the news of the show's potential cancellation becoming public in early 2022, an online petition amassed more than 67,000 signatures to save the show. The petition did not change Channel 5's decision, who maintained that Neighbours remained popular and ending the show was solely a "business decision". Production were then tasked with bringing the show to an end within a few months. Herbison had already envisioned an ideal way to end the series, and Isheev and other writers supported his plans. Herbison did not wish to end the show with excessive finality, such as in the destruction of the primary location of Ramsay Street, and opted for a celebratory theme that acknowledged the show's history.

Alan Fletcher, who played Karl Kennedy, regularly provided the media with updates about the finale's development. Neighbours writers finished storylining the episodes in March and in May cast members received their final scripts. The finale contains numerous cast returns, some of which were publicised, while others remained secret. Jason Donovan and Kylie Minogue's returns as Scott and Charlene Robinson attracted much media attention. Other high-profile returning cast included Margot Robbie, Natalie Imbruglia, Holly Valance and Delta Goodrem. Many returns were facilitated by one of the episodes' main stories, the wedding of Melanie Pearson (Lucinda Cowden) and Toadie Rebecchi (Ryan Moloney). The episodes also featured the return of Guy Pearce as Mike Young. His story provided the finale with further nostalgia, as writers reunited Mike with his 1980s love interest Jane Harris (Annie Jones), who had returned to the regular cast in 2020. Other stories included all but one of the houses on Ramsay Street being put up for sale, and Amy Greenwood's (Jacinta Stapleton) plan to have more children. Herbison used the latter story to fulfil his wish to leave viewers with a remaining mystery.

There were post-production challenges, following Network 10's decision to broadcast the finale in a ninety-minute format. Episode 8901 was edited into the original sixty minute version, with the extended run-time allowing for extended dialogue and an extra cameo from Stephanie McIntosh as Sky Mangel. These were not featured in the British broadcast, where episode 8901 was broadcast earlier on the same day as the final hour, which was broadcast in a primetime slot. Herbison later revealed that there were more than fifteen minutes of footage cut from the episode. The episode featured more commercial music than any episode had done previously. One of the episode's most prominent features was a monologue performed by Jackie Woodburne as Susan Kennedy, which forms the final scenes of the show. Herbison wanted Woodburne to have the opportunity to have a final "performance of a lifetime" in Neighbours. Woodburne reads Susan's entry into the Ramsay Street history book as the character reminisces and walks around a party held on Ramsay Street. Many television critics and fans praised the scene for its sentimental and emotional value.

There was considerable hype and anticipation from the media in the build-up to the finale, and the episodes attracted much praise from television critics. It was a television event that garnered many positive cast and celebrity responses, although three former cast members were disgruntled and criticised the episodes. Ratings for the finale were high; in Australia the episode was watched by 1.382 million viewers and gave Network 10 its biggest audience of the year. In the United Kingdom the Broadcasters' Audience Research Board reported that 4.02 million viewers watched the finale, with the addition of recordings and catch-up services. In the wake of the finale's success, Amazon Freevee finalised an agreement with the show's production company to revive the series, with its return announced in November 2022.

== Plot ==
Malcolm Kennedy visits his parents, Karl and Susan, for lunch. Jane Harris also arrives to talk to Susan about her personal problems and her partner, Clive Gibbons, tells Shane Ramsay about his. Levi Canning asks Izzy to contribute to the Ramsay Street history book. Callum Rebecchi arrives home to attend his father Toadfish Rebecchi's wedding to Melanie Pearson. Clive surprises Jane by dressing up as a gorillagram. She is touched by the gesture, but they are interrupted by Mike Young on a motorcycle. Izzy becomes tearful as she reads the Kennedy family page in the history book. Mike goes to see his daughter Sam, and his old friend Paul Robinson. Karl and Susan visit Malcolm to tell him that Izzy and Shane kissed, but discover that Izzy has already told him, ending the relationship. Paul tells Mike that Shane is buying Lassiters and they arrange a get-together in the Lassiters complex. Jane meets Mike, whom she had previously dated, and she joins them for drinks. Toadie voices his regrets that his friend Amy Greenwood will not be at the wedding. Amy returns and explains that she ran away because she thought she had romantic feelings for Toadie, but Joel Samuels helped her realise otherwise. Susan finds Izzy, thanks her for being honest and tells her that she needs to find happiness. Harold and Shane join Jane, Paul, Mike and Sam, and they reminisce. An uncomfortable Jane leaves the group when Clive arrives and talks to Mike. Mike reassures Clive he is visiting Sam and does not want to reconcile with Jane.

Susan is shocked to see all the houses on Ramsay Street are up for sale. She and Karl go through the history book with Harold, who suggests she writes the introduction. Mike and Sam visit the street and meet Jane; they reminisce about their history together on a tour of the street. Paul admits to Clive that he still loves his former wife, Terese Willis. Susan and Karl discuss their neighbours leaving the street, and she admits her uncertainty about writing the book's introduction. Witnessing Jane and Mike on Ramsay Street, a drunken Clive tries to fight Mike using a lamp as a weapon. Harold separates them by spraying them with water. Clive claims to have suffered a nervous breakdown, and Mike tells Paul he is not trying to cause trouble. Des turns up and says that he told Clive to give up as Jane is not interested in him any more. Jane admits that she has thought about Mike a lot over the years, while Paul asks Mike what he wants. Paul and Terese kiss, but Paul leaves before Terese can tell him she and Glen Donnelly broke up. Karl posts a video to the Ramsay Street Facebook page, which former residents Felicity Scully and Beth Brennan watch when they coincidentally meet. Beth tells Felicity that Toadie is getting married. Back in Erinsborough, Terese tells Lucy about her kiss with Paul. Sam encourages her father to move on, like her mother has, after revealing that Jane is not attending the wedding.

Everyone gathers for Toadie and Melanie's wedding, while Mike visits Jane. Paul and Terese reconcile after the ceremony, and Paul then cancels the hotel sale. Scott and Charlene Robinson turn up on Ramsay Street and realise no one is home. Scott then stops Charlene entering through an open window at Number 24. Mike tells Jane about his break-up with Sam's mother and that, while they are emotionally damaged, they should try to be happy. The wedding party relocates to the street for the reception. Aaron Brennan, and David and Leo Tanaka, decide to stay in Erinsborough when they learn that Paul and Terese have reconciled. Nicolette Stone agrees to stay and resumes her relationship with Kiri Durant, while Elly Conway and Chloe reconcile. Toadie and Melanie decide to stay on Ramsay Street after watching congratulatory video messages. Clive tells Jane and Mike that he is going to Los Angeles. Jane reconciles her friendship with Paul. Amy tells Toadie that she found a sperm donor, implying it is someone he knows. Mike reveals to Jane and Sam that he has matched Shane's offer to buy Number 24 and will seek work at Erinsborough High. Mike confesses his love for Jane, and they resume their relationship. Susan decides what to write in the history book. She then walks through Ramsay Street as her book introduction is voiced over the scene. Various residents celebrate in the street as a floating balloon bursts, showering everyone with confetti.

== Regular cast appearances ==
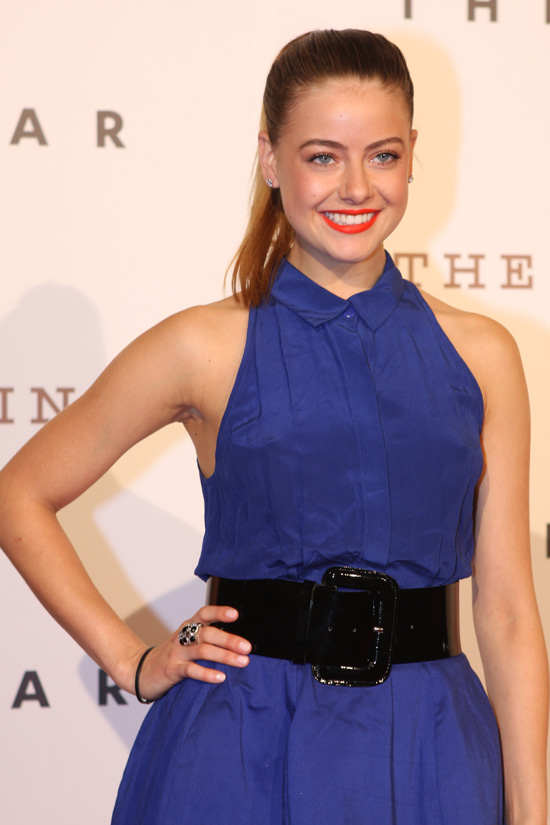
April Rose Pengilly

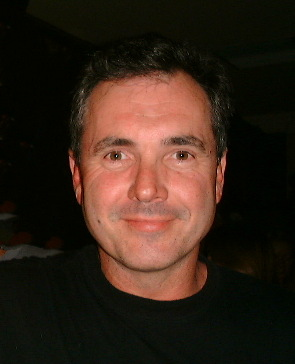
Alan Fletcher

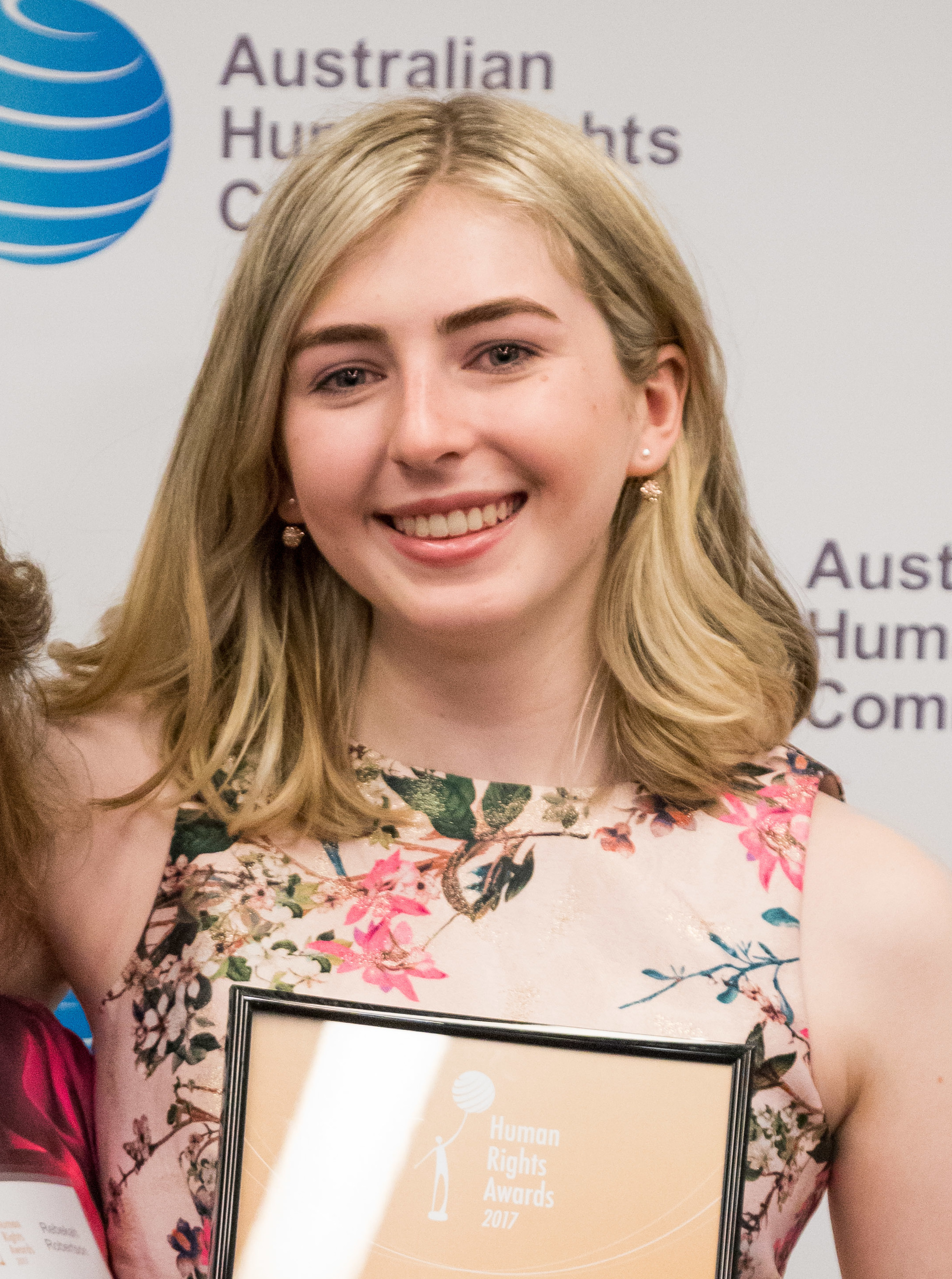
Georgie Stone

- Stefan Dennis as Paul Robinson
- Alan Fletcher as Karl Kennedy
- Ryan Moloney as Toadie Rebecchi
- Jackie Woodburne as Susan Kennedy
- Lucinda Cowden as Melanie Pearson
- Charlotte Chimes as Nicolette Stone
- Rebekah Elmaloglou as Terese Willis
- Takaya Honda as David Tanaka
- Richard Huggett as Glen Donnelly
- Annie Jones as Jane Harris
- Tim Kano as Leo Tanaka
- Gemma Bird Matheson as Kiri Durant
- Richie Morris as Levi Canning
- Geoff Paine as Clive Gibbons
- April Rose Pengilly as Chloe Brennan
- Phoebe Roberts as Freya Wozniak
- Jacinta Stapleton as Amy Greenwood
- Georgie Stone as Mackenzie Hargreaves
- Matt Wilson as Aaron Brennan

== Production ==
=== Background ===
In July 2021, Australian magazine Woman's Day ran a story revealing Neighbours was facing cancellation. The report cited the recent decrease to four episodes a week in Australia, British broadcaster Channel 5's desire to establish an hour of news programming over the show's afternoon timeslot, and the accusations of prejudice made by guest star Shareena Clayton. The show's Executive Producer, Jason Herbison, was informed about the possibility the show could end in 2021, and relayed the news to cast and crew. On 6 February 2022, it was reported that Channel 5 had not reached a new deal with Neighbours' production company Fremantle, and as a consequence would not be funding or broadcasting the show beyond its current contract. Fremantle remained committed to producing the series on the understanding the show could secure a new international backer. Herbison did not receive confirmation of Channel 5 ending their contract until shortly before it was publicised. Herbison told Andrew Mercado from Mediaweek that "we are very proud of everything Neighbours has achieved. We see the next few months as being a huge celebration for the show with a bit of everything for viewers. Any ending will be respectful of the past, the present and always open to a future." In response to the news, an online petition titled "Channel 5 – Don't Axe Neighbours" was created via Change.org, which gained more than 67,000 signatures. The name of the petition's creator, Edward Skylover, was used in an episode of Neighbours broadcast later in the year, in gratitude for his display of support.

On 3 March, it was confirmed that the show would end because an alternative broadcasting partner had not been found. It was stated that production would cease in June that year after thirty-seven years of filming. A statement from the production team read: "we are so sorry to say that after nearly 37 years and almost 9,000 episodes broadcast we have to confirm that Neighbours will cease production in June." The statement detailed that there was "no option" to continue production but promised "to end the show on an incredible high." Herbison used the terminology that the show was being "rested" rather than "axed". He explained that Neighbours is a huge brand and the company would be "open to all possibilities", but the show was ending for the foreseeable future and cast members were free to pursue other projects following its end. In the show's final month on-screen, Channel 5 controller Ben Frow described ending the show as solely a "business decision".

=== Development ===
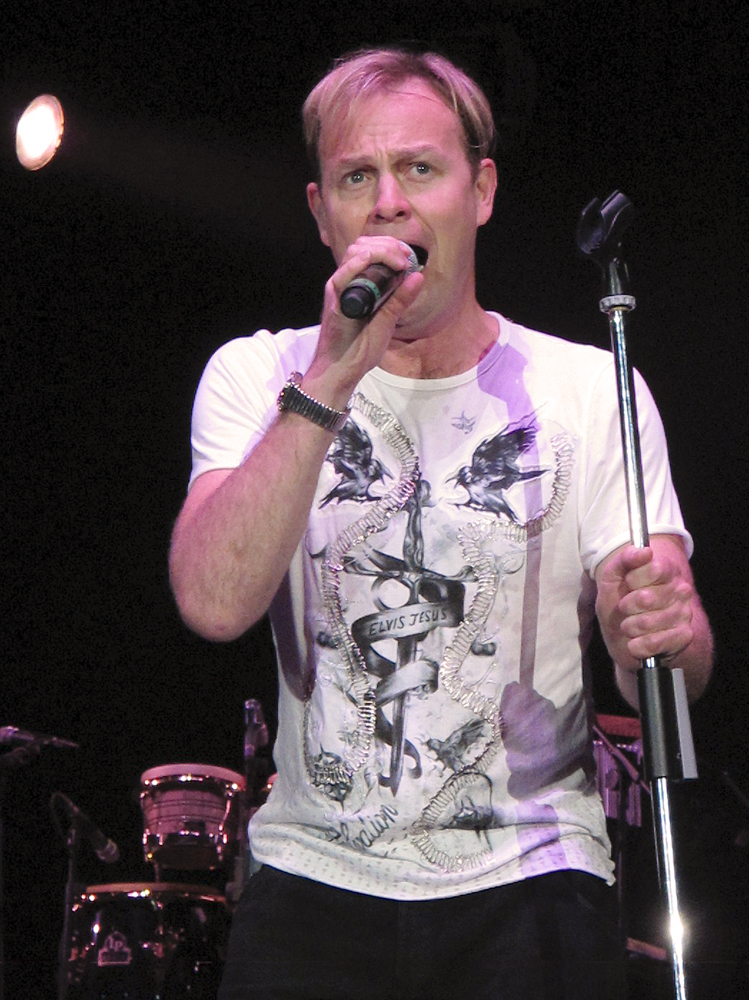
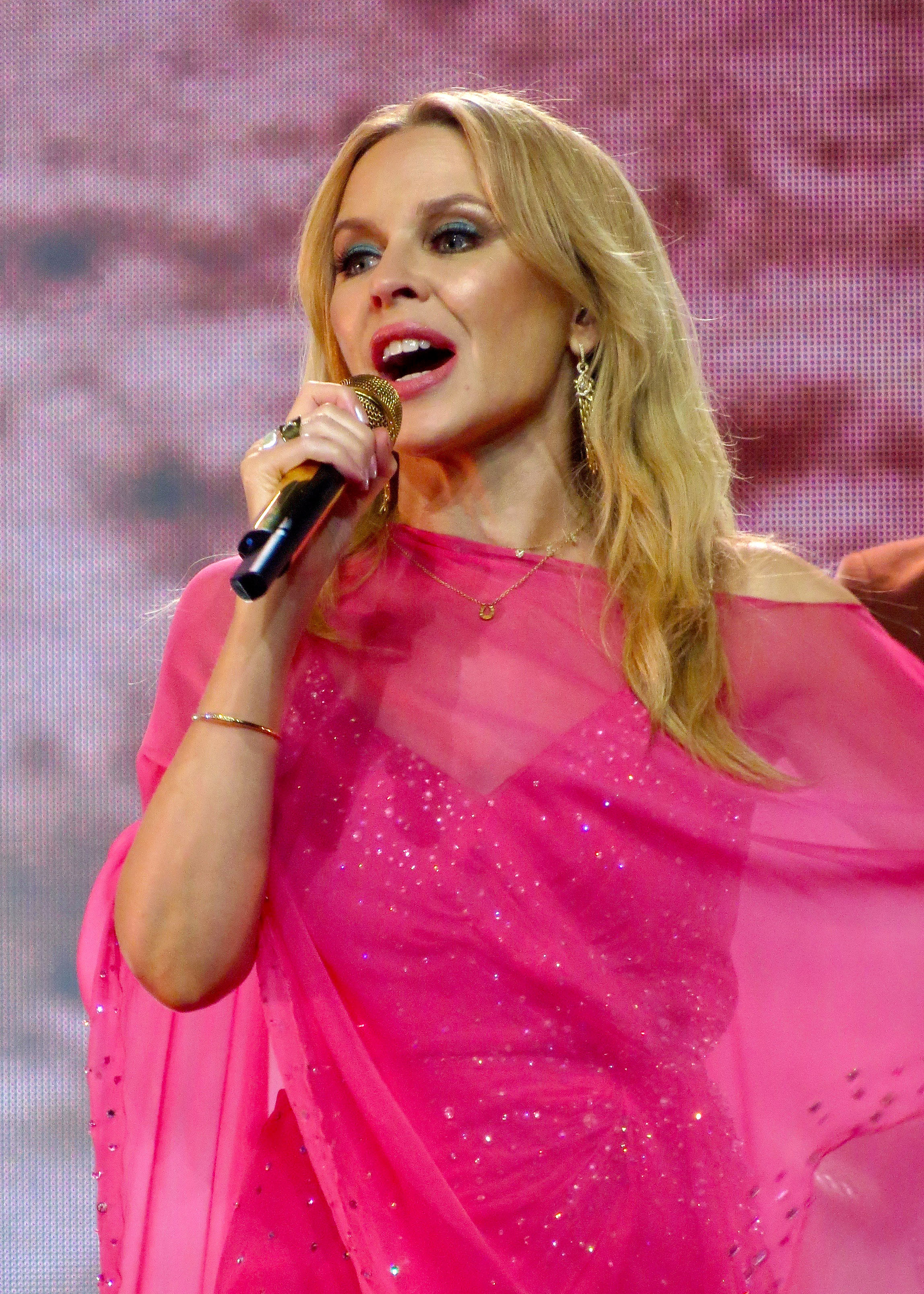
Jason Donovan and Kylie Minogue's returns as Scott and Charlene Robinson formed the early developments of the finale.

After the show's cancellation was confirmed, Herbison disclosed that he had already thought of an idea to end the show. He did not reveal any details and noted that it was not storylined or written, and could still change. He teased that the final episode would be a "wonderful" ending to end the show "on a high". After the finale was broadcast, he confirmed that his initial vision included "the joyous street party, Susan's voiceover, the characters no longer with us, the balloon, the original theme song and the message to audience". Herbison elected not to end the show with a destructive storyline, preferring to construct the finale as a celebration of the show's history. He told David Knox from TV Tonight that "I would never, ever blow [Ramsay Street] up. The ending will be a celebration of the past and the present, with the door very much left open for a future." He added that "Ramsay Street is eternal" and he wanted it to live on in the minds of its viewers. Herbison and the show's story producer Shane Isheev began working together on the show's final episodes and last scenes. Herbison asked Isheev to pitch his ideas for the show's finale. Herbison began by revealing his vision and even detailed the final scene and dialogue. Isheev recalled becoming emotional and experiencing "goosebumps" upon hearing Herbison's ideas, and was so impressed with Herbison's vision that he chose not to pitch his own ideas. Isheev, a fan of the show himself, believed that he and Herbison had created an ending fitting for a Neighbours fan, while acknowledging that it would be impossible to please everyone.

Herbison, Isheev and story consultant Sarah Mayberry worked together storylining the final two weeks, before Herbison worked on the finale personally. Herbison knew there was too much material to fit into the finale, so supervised the revision of earlier episodes. On 4 March, Isheev announced that his writing team had finished storylining the show's ending. The team gathered for their final group sessions on the set of 22 Ramsay Street's rear-garden set.

On 9 May, Bella Fowler from news.com.au reported that a script of one of the final episodes had been leaked and revealed Kylie Minogue and Jason Donovan's role in the finale. Fowler reported that the script ended with Scott and Charlene Robinson arriving on Ramsay Street in a car, before they step out and say the line: "We're home." The leaked script remained unverified, until Herbison later claimed that the details were inaccurate and the show's ending remained a secret. On 20 May, Alan Fletcher, who plays Karl Kennedy revealed that he had received his scripts for the show's final episode. Neighbours writer Emma J Steele also confirmed via her Twitter account that she had finished her final shift with the show. On 23 May, Herbison confirmed he had written the final episodes and the scripts had been given out to the show's cast and crew.

Herbison felt "very privileged" to be able to write the episodes and bring the show to its conclusion. He was able to write his vision of how he wanted to end the show and hoped the audience would enjoy it. He told Digital Spy's Daniel Kilkelly: "The magnitude of the moment is not lost on me and everyone is coming together behind the scenes to make the ending as befitting as possible." Herbison also said that he had yet to see anyone guess what would happen and believed the final scene would be quite hard to guess. Upon completion of the finale's development, Herbison hoped to "wrap everything up in a satisfying way" with "ultimately joyous" scenes that follow months of "triumph, tragedy, laughter and tears." Ryan Moloney who plays Toadie Rebecchi revealed that the finale has a "vibe" to it where everyone involved said "come on, let's finish it really well." Rebekah Elmaloglou (Terese Willis) told Tom Spilsbury of Total TV Guide that "the finale is a lovely, big celebration of the show. It was important to all of us that we went out with a bang. We're in for a treat."

=== Cast ===
In February 2022, Laura-Jayne Tyler of Inside Soap reported that Ian Smith would be reprising his role of Harold Bishop to play a part in the show's prospective finale, and that he had already started filming. On the day the show's cancellation was confirmed, it was announced that Peter O'Brien would also return as original character Shane Ramsay. Shortly after, Fletcher publicised the fact that producers were working "very hard" to convince some of the show's most memorable cast members to return for the finale. On 14 February 2022, it was reported that producers wanted Jason Donovan and Kylie Minogue to reprise their respective roles as Scott Robinson and Charlene Robinson. Donovan had already stated his interest in returning while producers were waiting for Minogue's response. On 1 May 2022, their return was indicated by Instagram posts of a Neighbours script from both Minogue and Donovan. Herbison confirmed the casting news via his Twitter account and stated it would not have been right to end the show without "the ultimate Neighbours couple", adding that they "play a very special part in our series finale." Herbison told Laura-Jayne Tyler of Inside Soap that it took "very little persuading" to get Donovan and Minogue to return as they both had an appreciation for the show and the part it played in their respective careers. Herbison wrote their scene in secret and initially kept it from the script department.

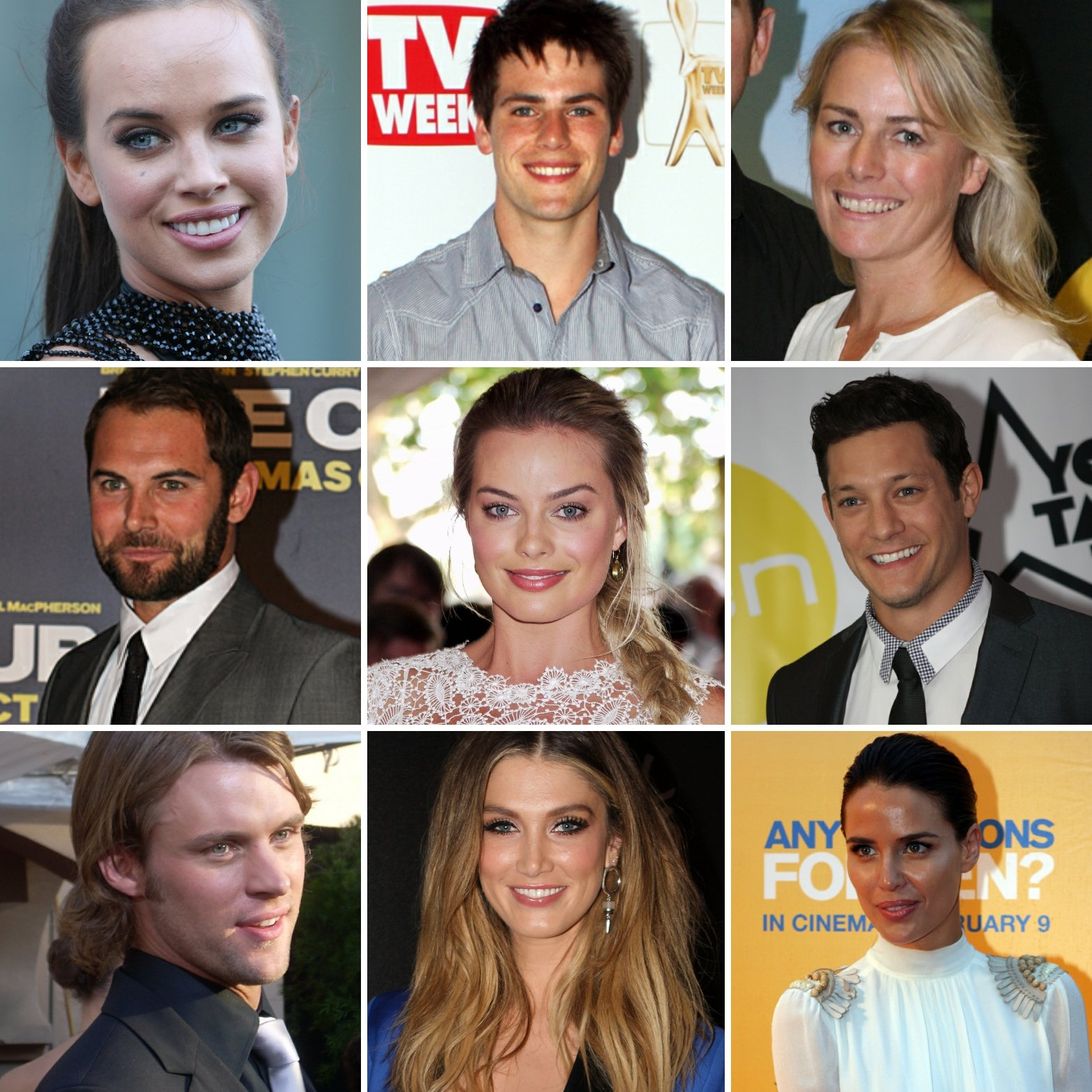
Bonnie Anderson, James Mason, Kate Kendall, Daniel MacPherson, Margot Robbie, Rob Mills, Jesse Spencer, Delta Goodrem and Jodi Gordon all guest starred in the finale.

Of her return, Minogue told Brooke Boney from Today that she had spent "so long" thinking a return to Neighbours would be nonsensical. Donovan suggested to Minogue that it would be a good opportunity to thank Neighbours. She recalled that driving into Ramsay Street "was quite something" and that upon her return old memories resurfaced of the characters Charlene, Scott, Harold and Jane Harris (Annie Jones). She later told Jenny Paul from Glamour that she and Donovan agreed to return to thank long-term viewers of the series who watched their characters. On 26 May, footage of Minogue in character as Charlene was leaked onto video hosting application TikTok. The video showed Minogue conversing with a film crew. Donovan later revealed that their return involved "denim" clothing but warned, "I do hope the expectations aren't too big."

On 7 May 2022, numerous other cast members from each decade of the show were announced to be returning. On 24 May, Bonnie Anderson was confirmed to be returning as Bea Nilsson for the final episode, where she was reunited with her on-screen sister Elly Conway, played by Jodi Gordon. On 1 June, Rob Mills confirmed his return as Finn Kelly during an interview on Studio 10. Two days later, it was announced Guy Pearce had reprised his role of Mike Young. Having already discussed a hypothetical return with Donovan, Pearce accepted the invitation to appear when it was offered in March 2022.

In the week leading up to the finale, more former cast returns were confirmed. These included Anne Charleston reprising her role as Madge Bishop for the second time since the character's death. Margot Robbie reprised her role as Donna Freedman for the episode. Her return was newsworthy as she had become a successful film actress in the United States. It was also confirmed that the characters Nina Tucker (Delta Goodrem), Libby Kennedy (Kym Valentine), Billy Kennedy (Jesse Spencer) and Stephanie Scully (Carla Bonner) would feature in the episode. These cast announcements were publicised via Neighbours social media in a "surprise" statement. More returns included Natalie Imbruglia as Beth Brennan and Holly Valance as Felicity Scully.

Jason Donovan's father, Terence Donovan, briefly reprised his role of Doug Willis, making the finale the only occasion where the two featured in the same episode. Jason's daughter, Jemma Donavan, had been a regular cast member as Harlow Robinson from 2019, but left the series shortly before it ended and did not appear in the finale. Jason's half-sister Stephanie McIntosh also briefly reprised her role as Sky Mangel via video in some versions of the finale. Again, it was the only episode starring both siblings. Other characters reintroduced during the episode included Callum Rebecchi (Morgan Baker), Lucas Fitzgerald (Scott Major) and Ned Willis (Ben Hall). Alan Fletcher told Adam Beresford from TV Mag that producers managed to secure so many returnees because they were all grateful for the many professional opportunities the show gave them. He added that the returning cast provided the viewers with a "beautiful celebratory experience", allowing the show to end "in the style it deserves." He told Tom Spilsbury from Total TV Guide that people could think the numerous returns were "a bit gratuitous" but noted that Jason Herbison had a long history of bring back former characters. He concluded that he was "blown away" and shocked Herbison managed to secure so many returning cast members.

Some returns were not made public or leaked prior to the finale. These were the returns of Sharon Davies (Jessica Muschamp), Lance Wilkinson (Andrew Bibby), Tad Reeves (Jonathon Dutton), Stuart Parker (Blair McDonough), Naomi Canning (Morgana O'Reilly), Philip Martin (Ian Rawlings), Sonya Rebecchi (Eve Morey), Hendrix Greyson (Ben Turland) and Sky Mangel (Stephanie McIntosh), the latter who only appears in the Australian broadcast of the finale.

Herbison later confirmed that he wanted to bring more characters back but it was not possible due to COVID-19 isolation rules in Australia. Herbison continued to reintroduce cast into the final days of filming, and saw their successful integration as "a huge testament to the incredible crew". In addition to the cast that returned, Tom Oliver declined a personal invitation from Herbison to reprise his role as Lou Carpenter. Herbison nevertheless ensured that Lou was included in flashback sequences during the final week, in the photograph montage that accompanied the end credits, and also featured a letter addressed to "T Oliver". Don Bridges, who played Toadie's father Kevin Rebecchi, was asked to return, but he could not get time off from a play he was starring in. Herbison also wanted to include a white Labrador Retriever running through Ramsay Street, in homage to Bouncer, but he realised it was too difficult.

=== Filming ===
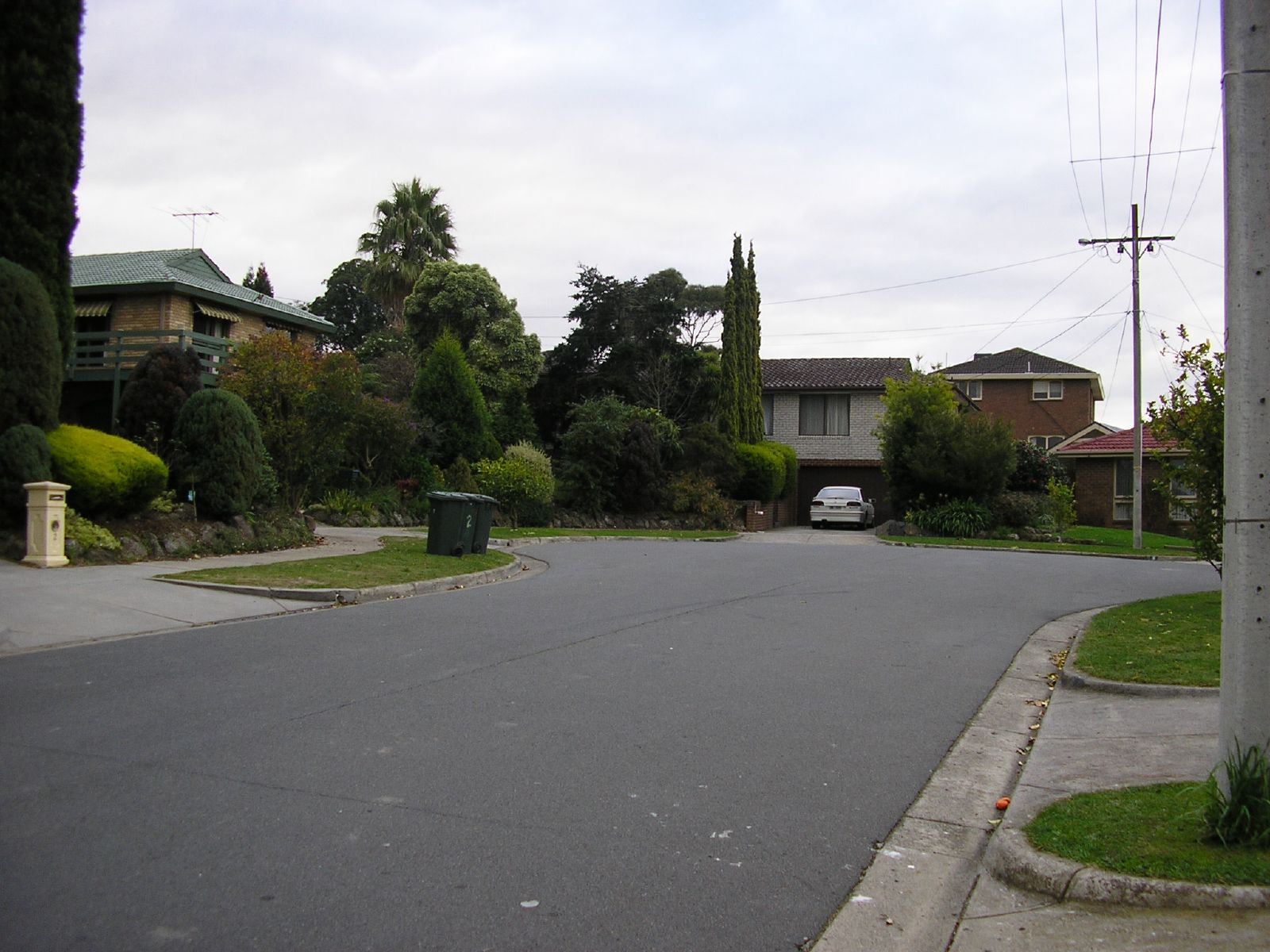
The show's finale scenes were filmed on Pin Oak Court in Melbourne, which is the setting of Ramsay Street

The episode was directed by former Neighbours actor Scott Major, who also appears on-screen as his character, Lucas Fitzgerald. Alan Fletcher publicised the finale in the months leading up to it. In March 2022, Fletcher claimed that the finale episodes would be an "incredible celebration with returning characters and extraordinary story lines." Nevertheless, the cast were not told about how exactly the show would end prior to filming the final episode. In May 2022, Fletcher told Tina Campbell from Evening Standard that he had been on a filming break but would soon return to the Neighbours set for the final four weeks of filming. He explained that "they are keeping it all very, very top secret I have to say [...] everyone has been voting on different ideas and laughing, but they are keeping it very much underwraps." He also revealed that writers had recently finished the scripts for the final episode and that it was likely to be a "huge celebration".

Minogue and Donovan filmed their return scene in the final week of April 2022, after the scheduling and logistical challenges to get both actors to film together were successfully overcome. Scott and Charlene's appearance is largely unconnected from the main storylines of the finale, with minimal dialogue. This was attributed to the pair's desire not to "overshadow" the current cast, and their scene having been filmed prior to the rest of the finale being written. Herbison was present when the pair filmed their scene and described it as "a very moving experience" and one that he felt privileged to be part of. It was later reported by a writer for the Herald Sun that body doubles had to be used when the couple were not in focus, as Minogue and Donovan were only available for half a day. Actor Rob Mills said filming on the final episode occurred on 1 June, describing the scenes as "very heartfelt" and reporting that the show ends "beautifully". Filming on the series wrapped on 10 June 2022. Cast member Georgie Stone (Mackenzie Hargreaves) chose to miss her own film premiere at the Tribeca Film Festival in order to film the show's final episodes. She said that she had to be part of the finale, as it is "a moment in history", and she wanted to finish her character's story after investing three years in it. Woodburne revealed that filming the finale scenes was challenging because of the cast's emotions. She described the finale scene as "very joyful and happy", although those involved were close to tears. Woodburne, whose in-character monologue dominates the last scene, said that "I was thrilled to be given that opportunity to narrate that last scene."

Geoff Paine, who played Clive Gibbons, described large news crew and a paparazzi presence outside of the Nunawading studios as filming concluded. There was cold weather during the final scenes filmed in Pin Oak Court, which is the setting of Ramsay Street. Paine revealed that the cast members involved had to act like it was a warm weather day. In addition paparazzi were attempting to obtain photos of the filming and Paine hid in a driveway to avoid being photographed. Fletcher described an emotional atmosphere on set but the busy filming schedule helped everyone remain focused. He told Gareth McLean from Radio Times that "right up until the end of the day, we were suppressing the emotions about the end of the show and just got on with the work. We had a lot to get through and some very big scenes, and it was obviously important that we finished on time. Being extremely focused is the thing that got us through."

Natalie Imbruglia (Beth) and Holly Valance (Felicity) filmed their scenes in London on 27 May 2022, after pitching the idea that they appear together to the producers. While the characters had never previously met, Imbruglia and Valance are close friends in real life. When Pearce arrived back on the set of Neighbours he was unsure of how to play Mike again. The producers still had Mike's old motorcycle gloves which Pearce said helped him get back into character. Herbison later revealed that there were scripted scenes that were not filmed due to running out of time. There was a planned sequence showing the party on Ramsay Street being ensembled in "record time". This was cancelled but Herbison revealed he would "love" the opportunity to reinstate it. Margot Robbie sent thirty-seven bottles of champagne to the Neighbours set as a gift to celebrate the end of filming. The cast also gathered for a wrap party on the show's set after filming ceased.

=== Post-production ===
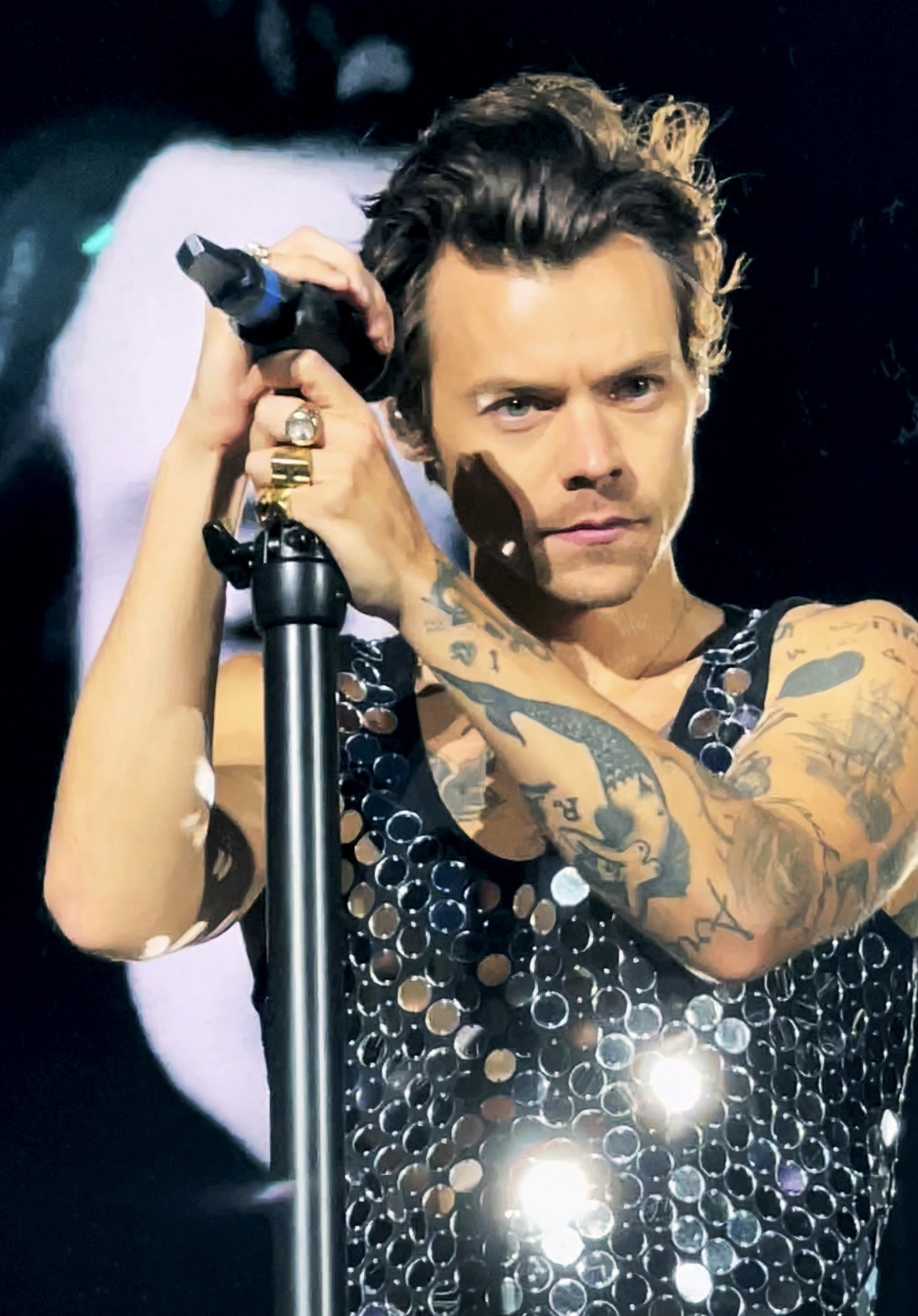
The episode features music from Harry Styles.

Three edits of the finale episodes were created for different broadcast territories. In Ireland, all three episodes were broadcast separately on consecutive nights. For the British broadcast, episodes 8902 and 8903 were edited together, creating a "specially-created hour" format with a "bespoke" teaser voiced by Stefan Dennis. Commercial tracks were also added to the UK broadcast, more extensively than in any previous episodes. Barnett claimed that the episode features "a mix of contemporary and classic" songs each chosen to suit the scene and "enhance the viewer experience". Production added songs from Harry Styles and George Ezra, but these were not featured in the Australian edition. The original Neighbours theme song, performed by Barry Crocker was used at the end of the episode. The end credits feature a montage of photographs from former and present characters before a message appeared on the screen stating: "Thank you for loving us, we love you."

When Network 10 decided to allocate a ninety-minute timeslot for the finale in Australia, further post-production was undertaken to add episode 8901 to the UK edit. The revised format opened up additional time, allowing deleted scenes to be "hurriedly" added in to the Australian broadcast. These scenes included an additional video message from Sky Mangel (Stephanie McIntosh), a scene in which Beth Brennan (Natalie Imbruglia) tells her son Ned Willis (Ben Hall) that she loves him, and a scene featuring Karl Kennedy (Alan Fletcher) telling Toadie Rebecchi (Ryan Moloney) that he is a son to him and Susan (Jackie Woodburne). This version was later broadcast in New Zealand, under the tile Neighbours: The Final Farewell.

There is an additional fifteen minutes of cut scenes that were removed from the episode. Herbison stated that these could be used in a future special cut of the episode. Isheev later revealed that a longer scene between Melanie (Lucinda Cowden) and Callum (Morgan Baker) was cut for time from the finale. It was later revealed that a portion of Paine's dialogue had been cut from a scene featuring Clive, Jane and Mike. On-screen Clive announces he is going to Los Angeles. The scene originally featured Clive explaining he is going to visit Sheila Canning (Colette Mann), following a phone call he received from her earlier in the week. Clive would have stated he is not reconciling with Sheila, but attempting to understand his failed relationships.

== Story development ==
=== Main stories ===
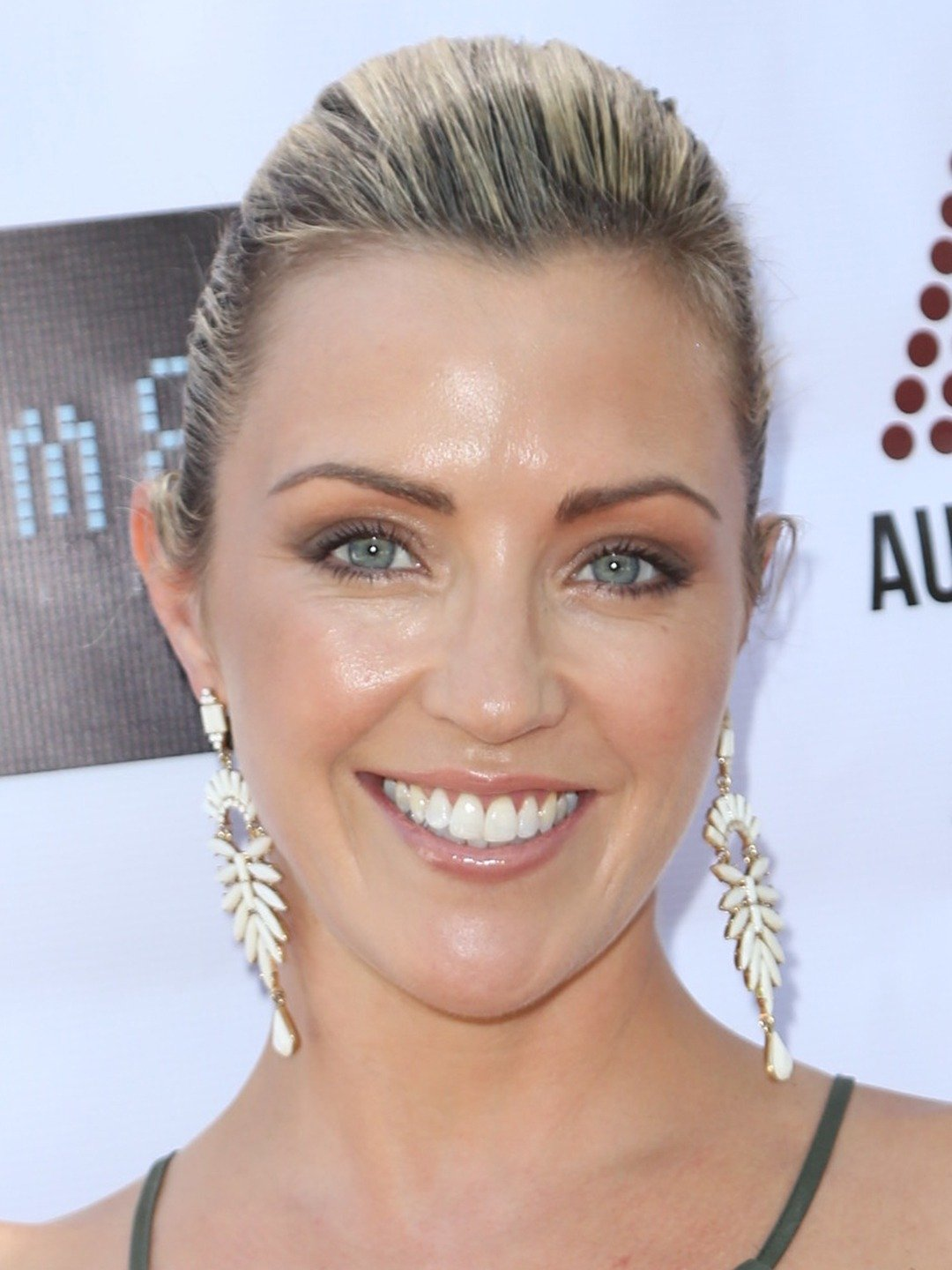
Writers deliberately gave Jacinta Stapleton's character, Amy Greenwood, a storyline which left viewers with unanswered questions.

One of the finale's main stories was the culmination of the potential sale of numerous houses on Ramsay Street, which would have left Karl and Susan as the only present regular characters remaining on the street. A Neighbours publicist told Johnathon Hughes from Inside Soap that "one by one, and for all sorts of different reasons, the owners of each house have decided to leave to make fresh starts elsewhere." Karl and Susan are "devastated" to see the for sale signs and worry about being left behind. The main narrative purpose of the house sales was to ensure that Ramsay Street itself played a significant role in the finale. Producer Jason Herbison told Daniel Kilkelly from Digital Spy that he wanted to create a "threat to the street", while not wishing to repeat stories featuring developers taking over the street. Instead, Herbison believed that having other residents moving on and leaving the Kennedys behind created an "emotional anchor" for the finale. He concluded that "I wanted to tug at the heartstrings as much as I could." The story also provided the opportunity for Mike and Jane's tour of the houses in Ramsay Street, as they were available for viewings. In the finale, all but one of the house sales is aborted, which was the plan from the storyline's conception. While Herbison felt that each character "had a natural reason to be moving on", some compromises were made to the storyline: "admittedly it happened very quickly and it's the perfect example of trying to balance story ambition with time. I originally envisaged a few more twists and turns to get everyone in the selling spirit".

Another central storyline is the wedding of Toadie Rebecchi and Melanie Pearson. The wedding allowed writers to introduce an upbeat celebration into the finale. Cowden told Alice Penwill from Inside Soap that it was a "really cute idea" to end the show with a wedding. She explained that the characters split the day into two with Toadie planning the ceremony and Melanie organising the after-party. The wedding takes place at the lake and this location was used to honour the deceased characters Sonya Rebecchi and Hendrix Greyson. Cowden described "cool vintage cars" transporting their characters in the wedding scenes. Melanie had often been portrayed as a pig enthusiast and revealed that writers remained true to that characterisation by including pig-related props. Writers used the character of Amy Greenwood to pose a potential threat to the success of the wedding. Amy had recently declared her love for Toadie and her return creates an issue. After Amy claims to have just been confused about her feelings, Melanie allows her to attend the wedding. Cowden believed that Melanie "feels sorry" for Amy, concluding that "Melanie isn't a person who judges others" and is able to forgive.

Many former characters return during the finale, the majority appearing for the wedding celebrations. Cowden believed that writers were correct to prominently feature Melanie and Toadie in the final story, with both having strong links to returning characters from their respective tenures. Cowden added "it's the best reason to get people back" and singled out the return of Morgan Baker as Callum Rebecchi. She revealed that Callum is "supportive" of his father's new marital arrangement and described Baker as a "joy" to work with. In 2021, Cowden was only supposed to briefly return but Melanie ended up staying and creating a life with Toadie. She concluded that "I can't believe the show is ending with my wedding – I'm incredibly grateful. And I got to bag the Toad!" Herbison told Daniel Kilkelly from Digital Spy that "I wanted the stories to provide natural opportunities for other characters to appear, which of course the wedding did."

Guy Pearce's return as Mike Young allowed writers to revisit the romance storyline between him and Jane Harris. which dated from the 1980s. Mike was Jane's first love, and she had recently ended her relationship with Clive Gibbons, who had previously lived with Mike on Ramsay Street. Mike's return causes trouble, and Mike and Clive end up having a physical altercation. Mike and Jane's scenes also explore their history, including reminiscences about Jane's famous makeover and when they were banned from visiting each other. Writers had storylined Mike and Jane's rekindled romance but it was dependent on Pearce reprising his role. Herbison believed that Pearce brought "so much more" to the story than was planned, particularly the revelation that Sam Young (Henrietta Graham) is Mike's daughter. Pearce is a family friend of Graham's, and requested to work with her as part of his appearance. He further suggested that Sam be made his character's daughter, which Herbison commented "we all felt was one of the most touching elements of the finale."

In one scene, Amy Greenwood (Jacinta Stapleton) reveals that she has found a sperm donor to enable her to have another child, but does not reveal the identity of the character. Herbison explained that his writers wanted to resolve most stories but they also wanted the odd "small mystery" to tease fans. He praised Stapleton's performance in the scene, adding that he had not decided on the donor's identity. Stapleton did not reprise her role when Neighbours returned in September 2023, and the mystery of her sperm donor was not initially revisited. However, later flashback scenes set shortly after the finale saw Amy reveal that Lance Wilkinson (Andrew Bibby) was the father of her baby.

Estranged couple Paul and Terese were also reunited in the finale. Herbison believed that had the show continued, the couple would have been separated for longer. He added: "with Paul, I think it's a case of better the devil you know. Terese hasn't always walked a straight line and they are each other's equal. I'm glad I reunited them and I don't think Paul will ever change. But as Terese wrote on her note, she accepts that. That doesn't mean she won't end up ripping up the note!"

=== Susan's speech ===
"How do you begin to describe a street? Do you talk about the houses? The bricks and the mortar, the gardens and the trees? Or do you talk about the people? The young, the old, and everyone in between? Where do you begin with the history? Do you start with your own, or those who came before you? When we moved to Ramsay Street, the community was already here. The Ramsays and The Robinsons... The stories from those early days are legendary, and their legacy still lives on today...

There have been many families over the years of all shapes and sizes... some of them unexpected. And friends who became like family, whether they were related or not. Love has always been a central theme. How many romances were born on this street? Things seldom ran smoothly, of course, but they usually worked out in the end. I think of all the people who never crossed paths who could have been great friends. And those who kept turning up whether we welcomed them or not. The street always has a way of bringing people back.

Then I think of the people who can't come back... The people gone too soon... how would they look if they were still alive today? If they'd been allowed to reach their potential? So many people that were lost... and then others... others who were just lost. I think you have to acknowledge everything. Celebrate it all. The good, the bad. Because all of that makes us who we are. Everyone deserves a place in the history of Ramsay Street. Even those who watched us from afar. Together, we've been the perfect blend."

— Jackie Woodburne's voiceover speech as Susan.

The closing moments of the show feature a voiceover speech performed by Jackie Woodburne as Susan. It accompanies scenes in which Susan leaves her house and walks through Ramsay Street during the wedding reception street party. Harold asks Susan to be the custodian of the Ramsay Street history book and asks her to write the introduction, which forms the words of her monologue. She also imagines characters who were killed off in the series attending the party. Herbison believed the speech was the easiest part of the script to write because they were his genuine thoughts about the show. Herbison chose Woodburne to close the show because "Susan is the heart of Ramsay Street". He added that he wanted her to "give us one more performance of a lifetime" before the credits rolled.

Director Scott Major and production designer Peta Lawson were tasked with transforming Herbison's vision into the closing moments. After Susan's speech a balloon bursts and showers confetti onto the street. Herbison claimed that Major and Lawson "looked at me like I was slightly crazy" but "supported the vision and made it happen." The show's international viewers were referenced in the line "everyone deserves a place in the history of Ramsay Street. Even those who watched us from afar." The closing line of "together, we've been the perfect blend", pays homage to the show's theme tune, which contains the lyrics "the perfect blend". The original scripts for the speech were later made available to view online.

== Promotion ==
In the final week of filming, the Australian morning talk show Studio 10 broadcast live from the Neighbours studios in Nunawading, hosting a series of promotional interviews. They were the only media organisation given access to the set. On 11 July, Minogue released exclusive on-set photographs of herself and Donovan in character. Minogue and Donovan also decided to re-release their 1988 single "Especially for You" to commemorate their on-screen reunion. The single was released on vinyl, cassette and digital download. Network 10 promoted the episode as a "history making finale" which would be "gripping and emotional" and contain "something for everyone spanning all generations of viewers".

Various British magazines promoted the finale in the week of its broadcast. Minogue and Donovan featured on the cover of TV Choice, TV Mag, What's on TV and TVTimes. Smith, Minogue, Donovan, Jones and Dennis appeared on the cover of the Daily Mirror's "LOVE TV" magazine. The finale was also given the header space on Inside Soap's thirtieth 2022 issue. Den of Geek compiled a how-to-guide on hosting your own Neighbours finale viewing party and urged fans to do so.

The finale received television news coverage on BBC News, Channel 5 news and ITV News. It was also covered in the official Sky News podcast. In Australia, Meg Watson, Thomas Mitchell and Caroline Schelle liveblogged the finale for The Age and The Sydney Morning Herald. In the United Kingdom, The Guardian's live blog was run by Scott Bryan.

== Broadcast ==
In March 2022, it was announced that the final episode would be broadcast on 1 August 2022 in both the UK and Australia. Australia's broadcasts of new episodes had fallen behind the United Kingdom's but from 13 June, 10 Peach began airing double episodes to catch up. A press release issued in May detailed that the finale would be an "epic double episode". David Knox from TV Tonight reported that executives from Network 10 had considered other options for the broadcast of the finale. One executive stated that the network wanted Neighbours to reach "the biggest, broadest audience" but was unsure it could air on their main channel.

On 30 June, amended scheduling was announced, placing the Neighbours finale on Network 10 in Australia, and in primetime on Channel 5 in the UK. The Australian triple episode was broadcast on Network 10 and 10 Peach simultaneously on 28 July at 7.30 pm. Hundreds of Australians gathered in the show's home city of Melbourne to watch the finale live on a big screen. Channel 5 also rescheduled the double episode finale to 29 July at 9 pm, following episode 8901 in the usual lunchtime and evening repeat timeslots on the same day. In Ireland, Neighbours concluded with episode 8903 on 3 August 2022 on RTÉ One and RTÉ2. The 90-minute finale aired on TVNZ 1 in New Zealand on 2 September 2022. The show's social media teams agreed not to post any spoilers regarding the episode until after the UK broadcast.

Channel 5 controller Ben Frow had asked his commissioning editor Greg Barnett to approve the Neighbours episode being moved into a primetime timeslot. Once he agreed, Frow asked Barnett to help create additional Neighbours themed content to coincide with the broadcast. The first show Neighbours: Made Me A Star explores the careers of successful cast following their departures from the series. The second, titled Neighbours: All The Pop Hits & More; Especially For You showcases a number of music videos from cast members who went onto have music careers and documents facts about them. They also commissioned a bespoke channel ident to celebrate and promote Neighbours in the week of the finale, and Alan Fletcher read continuity announcements for Channel 5 on the evening of the final episode.

== Reception ==
=== Hype and anticipation ===
Anticipation for the series finale was high, with an initial focus on Donovan and Minogue's return. Ash Percival of HuffPost reported that the casting of Minogue and Donovan "lit up Twitter" with fan reactions and predicted an "emotional finale". Emily Martin (WalesOnline) addressed her doubts about how writers could create a celebration of the show ending. She opined that everyone was "sulking" until Minogue and Donavan's returns were confirmed.

Of the reports that the finale's closing moments had leaked, Chantelle Schmidt from Pedestrian said that ending with Scott and Charlene's arrival "does feel like a cute and almost predictable way to finish" the show. She also believed Scott and Charlene were the best characters to end the show with given the televised ratings their wedding episode achieved. Bella Fowler of news.com.au expressed disappointment that Scott and Charlene would not gain a return storyline, though she believed it would give "millions of diehard Neighbours fans closure". A reporter from New Zealand's More FM branded it the supercouple's "perfect ending".

There was also much anticipation of the final episode's story. Michael Idato of The Sydney Morning Herald compiled a list of six possible endings. Idato believed that writers had a difficult task to end the series. He noted a hastily written script would be "best business practice" but "disastrous" for the show and its viewers. On-set photographs released via Minogue featured a property sale sign in the background and fans began speculating that the show would end with Scott and Charlene returning to Ramsay Street to buy the house. During the week prior to the finale's broadcast, Jared Evitts from Wales Online reported that producers remained secretive but "speculation has gone wild for how the show might draw to a close". Digital Spy's Joe Anderton wondered what Pearce's role in the finale would be and confessed "we can't see wait to see how it all plays out."

=== Ratings ===
The original broadcast of the finale saw Neighbours become the number one show of the night in Australia. The finale attracted an audience of 873,000 metropolitan viewers and led all demographics across the two channels, making it the show's highest rated episode since 2009. Television journalist Colin Vickery confirmed the episode achieved an average of 1.2 million viewers nationally, which combines the metro and regional audiences, and had a peak of 1.41 million viewers. It had a 41.6% commercial share.

Revised numbers released by OzTAM on 5 August 2022 showed that the episode was watched by 1.382 million viewers. This combines overnight, regional, and BVOD numbers, which was an increase of 27% on the overnight metro number. David Knox of TV Tonight expected the number to rise once the 28-day consolidated viewing data came in. He also reported that the finale achieved Network 10's biggest audience since the broadcast of Oprah with Meghan and Harry, which was seen by an audience of 1.78 million.

In the UK, Episode 8901 was seen by 800,000 viewers, giving it a 16.1% audience share during its broadcast at 1.45 pm. The 6 pm airing secured 700,000 viewers and a 6.6% share. The finale was watched by 2.5 million viewers, giving it a 17% audience share. It became the highest rated episode since 2008 and the third highest rated episode since the serial's move to Channel 5. On 8 August, the Broadcasters' Audience Research Board reported that the number had increased to 4.02 million viewers, with the addition of recordings and catch-up services. Neighbours was the most-watched show of the week on Channel 5, the 17th most-watched show of the week across all channels, and it rated higher than every episode of British soap opera EastEnders that aired in the same week. The final figure is expected to rise further with the addition of the Saturday afternoon repeat figure and 28-day data.

=== Critical response ===
==== Positive analysis ====
Professional ratings
Review scores
Source	Rating
The Daily Telegraph	5/5 stars
The Guardian	5/5 stars
i	5/5 stars
The Independent	1/5 stars
Radio Times	4/5 stars
TVTimes	5/5 stars
Weekend	5/5 stars
Whattowatch.com	5/5 stars

The episode was chosen as the "Pick of the day" feature in the following magazines: Radio Times, The Times: Saturday review, Total TV Guide, TV Mag, TV Choice, TVTimes, Weekend and What's on TV. The episode was featured in What's on TV's "Hot TV" feature where it was named a "history-making finale" and "end of an era". Radio Times' David Brown believed writers were tasked with creating a finale to please generations of viewers. Brown described it as "less an hour of TV drama and more a mere parade of old familiar faces, there's just enough here to elicit squeals of delight from anyone who's spent time obsessing over Erinsborough." Brown also assessed that Mike and Jane were "at the heart" of the finale rather than Scott and Charlene as many had assumed. His colleague Helen Daly branded the wedding a "sweet, American-western inspired affair" and "unusual" because Neighbours weddings do not run successfully. She hailed Scott and Charlene's return as "big and bold", "nostalgia", "goosebump-inducing" and "camp" - but was "a little bit forced and slightly disconnected from the main storyline." Daly opined that the finale was Woodburne's episode because she was the "heart". The segments success was because "beloved Susan held all the values that Erinsborough put on a pedestal [...] If anyone could reflect on the history of the show, it's Susan." She believed the "beauty" of the "beautiful monologue" was how "delicately it spoke to fans"; its ghostly returns were also the "most touching moment of the entire week." Daly concluded "to say fans got what they wanted is an understatement. I defy anyone to be disappointed with the sheer amount of famous faces back on screen."

James Jackson from The Times: Saturday review branded it a "TV event" and recognised it as "the soap worlds Top Gun: Maverick". Frances Ryan (The Guardian) stated that the opening credits montage made "it feel like watching your life flash before your eyes." She branded it a "nostalgia-filled finale" and called the wedding "the crux" of the episode, allowing a "celebratory mood" and "most importantly" an angle for former character returns. She believed the slew of high-profile actors returning for the finale was "a testament" to Neighbours' success. She singled out a returning Pearce, who appeared to be "having the time of his life" and created "a moving reunion" with Jane. Ryan added that Scott and Charlene's returns made it feel like "thirty years have passed and no time at all." She also praised writers for managing to end existing plots alongside "sufficient nostalgia for older fans" despite the "challenge". Ryan concluded that "this isn't a finale mourning a show's demise: it's a celebration of its success – and what a success it was."

David Knox from TV Tonight believed original cast member Dennis having the opening lines of the finale was a fitting tribute. He believed that there was a lot of content to "cram" into one episode. Knox thought writers faced a difficult task to balance numerous returns with concluding stories. Knox claimed that they got it "mostly right" because of the sentimental wedding. He described "soapie U-turns left, right and centre" and numerous "nods to the past" and criticised the episode's fast pacing. The writer claimed that one scene was done at "such dizzying speed" that is caused him to "yell" at his television. Knox also critiqued Izzy's final story and opined that the Ramsay Street history book finally brought "Izzy to her senses" and ended her story. Knox believed writers reuniting Jane and Mike was "bringing soapie viewers the union they had longed for". On "favourite couple" Scott and Charlene's return Knox stated it was "a pop culture moment that was a miracle to bring off." He concluded that Susan's speech as "the finale's finest moment." Karl Quinn from The Age thought that Izzy was given a moment of "redemption" during the finale but true to her characterisation she could not "help but heap infamy upon scandal". He described the episode as "comforting, heartwarming, funny and even genuinely moving – in this last hurrah, it was certainly all that."

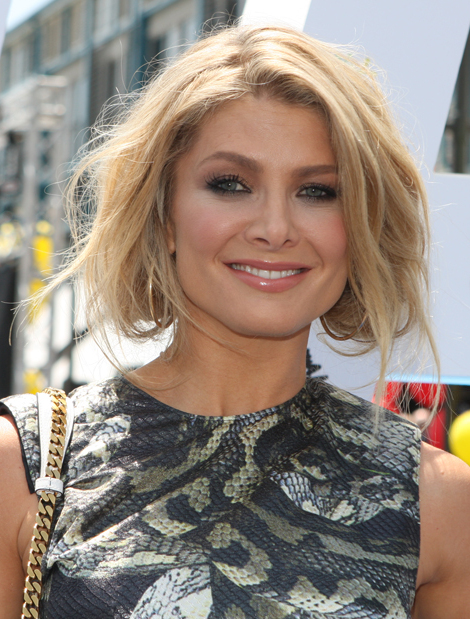
Natalie Bassingwhaite plays Izzy Hoyland, who critics believed gained redemption during the finale.

Laura-Jayne Tyler of Inside Soap praised Jackie Woodburne in particular for her performance, writing "For all the fanfare for the big name returns – the Hollywood blessings of Guy Pearce and Margot Robbie, or the strangely silent Kylie – the true star of the Neighbours finale was Jackie Woodburne. Susan's final speech about friendship and love, and especially remembering 'those who'd gone too soon' packed a real punch. Sleep well, Neighbours. You were just too good for this world." Tyler also enjoyed the scene in which Mike told Jane he still loved her, saying the moment "almost finished us off for good." Their colleague Johnathon Hughes branded the episode an "epic last episode" and Alice Penwill added that the wedding meant the characters leave television screens with "smiles on their faces". Digital Spy's Daniel Kilkelly believed that writers tricked viewers in the episodes prior to the finale via the sale of the Ramsay Street houses. He called it "depressing" and stole viewers "comfort" that life on Ramsay Street was eternal. Kilkelly believed the characters deciding not to move away provided an "element of surprise". Though he though "the sudden and implausible u-turns" were the type of "silliness that could only work on Neighbours." Kilkelly stated that Pearce "slotted back in effortlessly" as Mike and Scott and Charlene's return issued a "heartwarming moment which provided plenty of nostalgia." He branded Beth and Flick's returns as "gloriously silly" and questioned Philip Martin's "random" return. Kilkelly also had high praise for Woodburne's performance as Susan, who was "arguably the most beloved" of the finale cast. He wrote that she "stole the show" as was given the "well-deserved honour" of ending the show. He concluded that "tears will have been shed on both sides of the world thanks to Susan's heartfelt voiceover, reflecting on Ramsay Street and what it meant to her."

Ash Percival from HuffPost UK said that viewers "were left beside themselves" as they watched Woodburne narrate "a moving entry into the Ramsay Street history book". He branded the speech a "poignant monologue", "emotional scene" and "tear-jerking nostalgia trip". Charlie Milward of the Daily Express assessed that all characters "got their happy-ever-afters" and viewers were in disbelief over the finality of it all. Milward described episode 8901 as a "rollercoaster episode". Paul Stuart from the Coventry Telegraph described Susan's monologue as a "powerful speech" during an "emotional farewell show" that was "one last hurrah" for deceased characters. Katy Hallam from Birmingham Mail described the speech as "tear-jerking" and "powerful".

Shannen Findlay from Mamamia wrote that viewers were "understandably nervous" about Toadie and Melanie's wedding considering his past dramatic weddings. Findlay was "thankful" the wedding went "smoothly". She described Paine's dialogue dressed in a gorilla costume as "pretty emotional and corny". Imbruglia and Valance's cameos were described as "one heck of a surprise" and summarised the finale as an "emotional episode". A writer from STV News stated "Neighbours closed out its final moments with emotional reunions, a joyful wedding and a nostalgic tribute to past and present stars." They assessed that the wedding "provides moments of reunion and love" and the cameo video a "star-studded line-up" filled with "emotional tributes". Naomi Clarke and Kaitlin Easton from Daily Record headlined "Neighbours ends 37-year run with nostalgia, emotional reunions and wedding joy." They added that Susan's speech was "poignant".

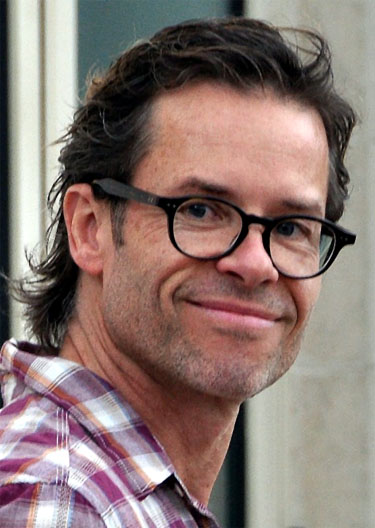
Guy Pearce received critical acclaim for his reprisal of the Mike Young role.

Claudia Connell from Weekend the episode had the "promise to be an emotional farewell" given all of the returning cast members. Steven Murphy from the Daily Express Saturday Magazine opined that the "action" in the episode mainly focuses on Toadie and Melanie's wedding and "contains several surprises". Jon Peake, editor of Total TV Guide opined that the finale allowed viewers to "wallow in nostalgia as a slew of old faces return." A Total TV Guide writer added that they were grateful Neighbours had "the chance to go out in a blaze of glory" and branded the wedding theme a "truly joyful occasion". A TV Mag writer stated their disbelief that the show was ending and branded the finale three episodes forming the finale as "emotional". Simon Timblick and Sarah Selwood from TVTimes branded the episode a "prime-time double-length episode celebrating its history." They thought that the returnees provided "more magic in the air" and that producers delivered on their promise to end the show on an "incredible high". Writing for Whattowatch.com, Timblick wrote it was an "emotional send-off" filled with romance, reunions and surprise appearances.

Emma Shacklock from Woman & Home praised the episode for being "packed full of special moments" and a "bittersweet experience". She singled out Woodburne's monologue performance and branded her lines as "amongst the most impactful and emotional of the episode". The episode's emotional theme surprised Anita Singh of The Daily Telegraph. She branded Mike and Jane's "genuinely touching" reunification as the show's "Casablanca moment". She praised Pearce's performance which was delivered "as if he was in an Oscar-worthy film". Singh assessed it was wholly "all about nostalgia" and ideal for older viewers. Daily Mirror's Ian Hyland wrote that the finale had "glorious offerings", "an absolute treat" mixed with the "added bonus" of cast returns. Hyland judged that there were "no major shocks" in the story but anyone who enjoyed a teenage romance would be "thrilled" by Mike and Jane's obvious "spark". Hyland appraised "the fact that you could watch them falling in love all over again without thinking, 'That's actual Guy Pearce from Hollywood right there!' spoke volumes for their enduring chemistry." Hyland believed that promotional photographs of Donovan and Minogue ruined "their brief royal walkabout" on-screen resulting in "an anti-climax".

==== Mixed and negative analysis ====
Ed Power (The Irish Times) wrote "goodness it goes out with an all-star bang." Power thought the regular cast and guest cast stories made the episodes feel like "two finales in one" set "in one universe". He also praised Pearce stating "he commits entirely to the part and never acts as if he's slumming it or doing Ramsay Street a favour." Gwendolyn Smith from i praised the "many joys of the momentous double-episode finale". She branded Clive and Mike's fight as "pure Ramsay Street" and "a bittersweet reminder of all the delightful absurdity we're going to miss." Smith thought it satisfied "Neighbours fanatics" and returning viewers. She summarised the finale as a "tear-jerking, star-packed nostalgia fest", "grand homecoming of the soap's illustrious Hollywood and pop alumni" and "an unapologetically soppy, self-referential affair studded with flashbacks to iconic Neighbours moments." Smith also observed "low-stakes drama and absurd emotional U-turns". She noted viewers had to "suspend disbelief" when all residents chose to remain on Ramsay Street. Smith described the final scenes as "cheesy, heart-rending and faintly hallucinogenic."

Ben Dowell from The Times criticised the episode because "it was narratively all over the place, the editing was terrible, the directing was clunky and some of the acting is best forgotten." He added "I loved it, but let's be honest: on one level this was terrible, less 47-odd minutes of drama than a shonky documentary." Nick Hilton from The Independent was not impressed with the episode, issuing it a one star rating. He scathed "a star-studded swansong that forgot the thing that makes soap operas so captivating: the plot." Hilton believed writers had a "Herculean task of resolution" to tie-up four decades of stories. He called the extended runtime "a creative decision that only prolongs the agony." The finale shows the juxtaposition between Neighbours' "bumbling soap actors and its A-list escapees in deep chiaroscuro." Hilton concluded that the numerous cameos gave the episode "an almost meta quality" and returning viewers would "undoubtedly find the production so cheap and flimsy that it's hardly a surprise it's fallen apart." Writing for Yahoo! News, David Brown arraigned the inclusion of various scenes as pointless. He lambasted "Neighbours brought us less an hour of television drama, and more a mere parade of old familiar faces who'd been booked to tickle the belly of fans both current and lapsed." Brown concluded that the finale was more "awkward" than "affecting" and was ultimately a "strangely hollow enterprise." Amy Denman of the Daily Mirror reported that cut scenes in the UK broadcast aggravated its British viewers. They profiled numerous angry messages posted to social media networking website Twitter.

=== Cast and celebrity response ===
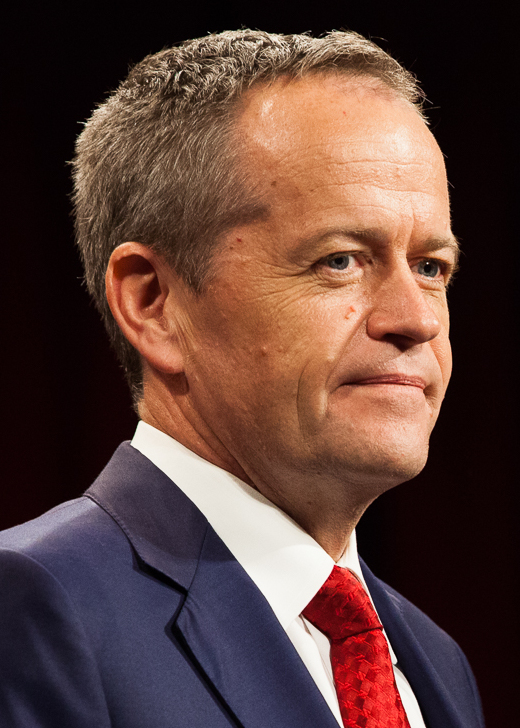
Australian politician Bill Shorten praised the finale.

Former Neighbours actor Craig McLachlan, who played Henry Ramsay, was not invited to appear in the episode despite his character's popularity. McLachlan had previously been found not guilty of sexual assault allegations and blamed cancel culture for being snubbed by producers. His agent claimed that it was unfair that his on-screen family returned for the episode without Henry. After the finale, McLachlan paid tribute to the show and filmed himself in character as Henry. Original cast member David Clencie, who played Danny Ramsay claimed that his offer to return for the finale was ignored by producers. He also accused the show's writers of stealing his storyline ideas after he publicised them via the Neighbours fansite "The Perfect Blend". Nicola Charles, who played Sarah Beaumont, believed she was not asked to appear as she is unvaccinated against COVID-19. She was critical of the episode, calling it a "shambles" and said that she felt relieved that her character was not part of it.

Takaya Honda revealed that many of the cast involved in the episode were having a watch party gathering. Fellow Australian soap opera Home and Away paid tribute to Neighbours after the finale. A farewell video for Neighbours was produced by the British soap opera EastEnders and featured a cameo from Alan Fletcher. It was released on the day of the finale and also contained cast members well wishes. Coronation Street also posted a farewell video to social media featuring two of their actors Sally Ann Matthews and Rob Mallard saying goodbye to the show.

Australian politician Bill Shorten stated the "Neighbours finale is the ultimate throwback. Every face is as familiar as our own neighbours, but also showing inclusive TV for people with disability. Brilliant." Australian actress Penny McNamee stated that the finale "had me feeling all the feels" and congratulated the cast. Rove McManus opined that the production "pulled the stops out to deliver a blockbuster finale." After viewing the finale, presenter Angela Bishop congratulated the cast and branded the finale a "brilliant" episode. Media personality Myf Warhurst praised Pearce and Jones' performance in the finale and called for their own spin-off show. Television presenter Lisa Wilkinson believed that they were "magical together" and wanted more television content from them. Actress and producer Jane Kennedy also voiced her admiration of the duo stating "Mike and Jane is everything". She added that the finale made her cry while she watched it. Home and Away actress Emily Symons stated that she and her co-stars were not happy to be the only Australian soap opera still airing and that they felt sad for the Neighbours cast and crew. She described the finale as "the most beautiful episode you've ever seen", adding "It was so emotional and wonderful to see all the old characters coming back – it was really special.". Screenwriter Russell T Davies called the finale "brilliant", praising Woodburne, the Izzy storyline and the revisitation of Jane's makeover.

=== Fan response ===
Fans praised the final episode of the series, including its wrapping up of storylines and reintroduction of former characters. In a study conducted by Dr Adam Gerace of CQUniversity shortly after the final episode aired in Australia and the UK, fans reported that they had experienced considerable feelings of grief and loss at the end of the series, but that they were grateful for what the series had given them. It was also found that an important influence on fans' upset was the extent to which they had formed strong connections and bonds with their favourite characters (termed a parasocial relationship).

=== Accolades ===
In 2024, Herbison received a nomination for Best Script for a Television Serial for Episode 8903 at the 56th AWGIE Awards.

== Aftermath ==
Discussions with potential broadcast partners for Neighbours had been held throughout 2022 and were ongoing with five interested parties, including Amazon Freevee, at the time of the finale's broadcast, unbeknownst to the cast and crew other than Herbison. Following the significant reaction to the finale, Amazon finalised plans with Fremantle to co-produce future episodes. The series' recommission was announced on 17 November 2022, and it resumed with episode 8904 on 18 September 2023. The revived series ran for a further two years, concluding again with episode 9363 in December 2025.
