= Final case =

Grammatical case

Final case is used for marking final cause ("for a house"). Semitic languages had this case, but all of them lost it. In Arabic, nouns in such position are marked by the accusative marking (e.g. ǧadda ṭalaban li-l-ʼaǧri he worked hard for the sake of reward).

== See also ==
- Causal-final case found in Hungarian language.
