= Finally (company) =

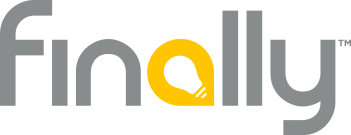
- Type: Private
- Industry: Consumer electronics
- Founded: 2012; 14 years ago in Woburn, Massachusetts
- Founder: John Goscha
- Headquarters: Charlestown, Boston, Massachusetts, U.S.
- Key people: Scott Almquist (CEO); John Goscha (Chairman)
- Website: finallybulbs.com

Lucidity Lights Inc., doing business as Finally, is an American company based in Boston, Massachusetts. Founded in 2012 by John Goscha, the company makes energy-efficient light bulbs that use induction technology and are being offered as a substitute for incandescents and LEDs. Company appears to be no longer in business.

== History ==
The Finally Light Bulb Company was founded in 2012 by John Goscha, who as an undergraduate at Babson College, founded IdeaPaint. Goscha enlisted Victor Roberts, a former General Electric engineer, Walter Lapatovich from Osram Sylvania, and engineers from Philips for technical expertise in lighting technology. With Roberts and Lapatovich, Goscha was able to adapt induction lighting technology, previously only used in commercial light fixtures, and miniaturize it for home use. The light bulb was officially launched and began sales in May 2014, with $19 million in initial funding from several investors including Babson College professors. The company was founded in Woburn, Massachusetts, but later moved to Boston, Massachusetts. The company's business model is focused on the 2020 phase-out of incandescent light bulbs in the United States mandated by federal law.

In January 2017, the company received an additional $15 million in funding from investors. As of July 2017, the Finally reported a total of $38 million in funding and employed 32 employees. In August 2018, Scott Almquist became CEO and President, and Goscha became Chairman. Almquist previously led four private equity-backed companies as CEO, President, or Chief Customer Officer, having spent the first twenty years of his career at Procter & Gamble. At the time, Finally light bulbs were available at Staples, Ace Hardware, Amazon, Wayfair, and Walmart's online store.

In March 2018, a new round of funding of $50 million brought the company's total funding to $93 million. The company announced that its products were added to The Home Depot and Costco stores, bringing the total number of stores where the products are available to almost 3,000.

== Product ==
The company claims that Finally light bulbs create a light similar to incandescents and better than LED light bulbs. Based on technology developed by Nikola Tesla, the bulb utilizes induction technology to create omnidirectional light in a traditionally-shaped light bulb. The tungsten filament in incandescent light bulbs is replaced by an induction coil. An electronic driver, and the three-inch antenna with a copper coil excite a mixture of argon gas and mercury vapor in the bulb to produce ultraviolet light which excites the phosphor coating on the inside of the glass to create visible light. They are "75 percent more efficient and last 15 times longer than incandescents." The current generation of LED lamps on the market have surpassed this by a substantial margin however and Finally is one of the few manufactures still marketing induction lamps.
