= Final Approach =

Final Approach may refer to:

- Final approach, the last leg in an aircraft's approach to landing
- Final Approach (1991 film), a thriller starring James Sikking
- Final Approach (2007 film), a TV action thriller starring Dean Cain
- Final Approach (video game), a Japanese visual novel and adapted anime series
- "Final Approach" (Wings), the 1997 two-part finale of American TV series Wings
- "Final Approach", a 1986 episode from the second season of MacGyver
