= List of Neighbours characters introduced in 2018 =

Neighbours characters appearing in 2018

Neighbours is an Australian television soap opera. It was first broadcast on 18 March 1985 and currently airs on digital channel 10 Peach. The following is a list of characters that appeared in the show in 2018, by order of first appearance. All characters are introduced by the shows executive producer Jason Herbison. The 34th season of Neighbours began airing from 8 January 2018. Mick Allsop was introduced during the same month, while Rafael Humphreys made his debut in February. March saw the arrival of Chloe Brennan. Bea Nilsson made her first appearance in May. Jemima Davies-Smythe began appearing from September, while Nance Sluggett, Pierce Greyson, Andrew Rodwell and Heather Schilling made their first appearances in October. Valerie Grundy, Delaney Renshaw, Regina Grundy, and Shaun Watkins appeared in December.

== Mick Allsop ==
Mick Allsop
- Neighbours character
- Portrayed by: Joel Creasey
- Duration: 2018, 2020–2022
- First appearance: 30 January 2018
- Last appearance: 1 June 2022
- Introduced by: Jason Herbison
In-universe information
- Occupation: Hotel front desk manager Personal assistant

Mick Allsop, played by comedian Joel Creasey, made his first appearance on 30 January 2018. Creasey's casting was confirmed by Anna Byrne of the Herald Sun in October 2017. Of appearing in the show, Creasey commented, "That was fun because it was a soap opera. It was very over the top, and they were like 'Yes! More!' They're all so nice out at Neighbours. I had a blast doing it." Creasey described Mick as "a new gay in town with a backstory", and "a bit of a misunderstood stalker". Executive producer Jason Herbison praised Creasey's "hilarious" performance and added that his character could return in a recurring capacity in the future. Creasey reprised the role for scenes filmed at Sydney Mardi Gras in 2019. His appearance aired on 28 February 2020. The following year, Creasey reprised the role and returned to the Neighbours set in July 2021 for filming. Creasey commented that it was "a larger role" this time, adding "It's been great because I had my own legendary soap stars on tap each day for advice." His return aired on 3 November 2021. Alice Penwill from Inside Soap wrote that she was "secretly enjoying Mick's hilarious hotel antics!"

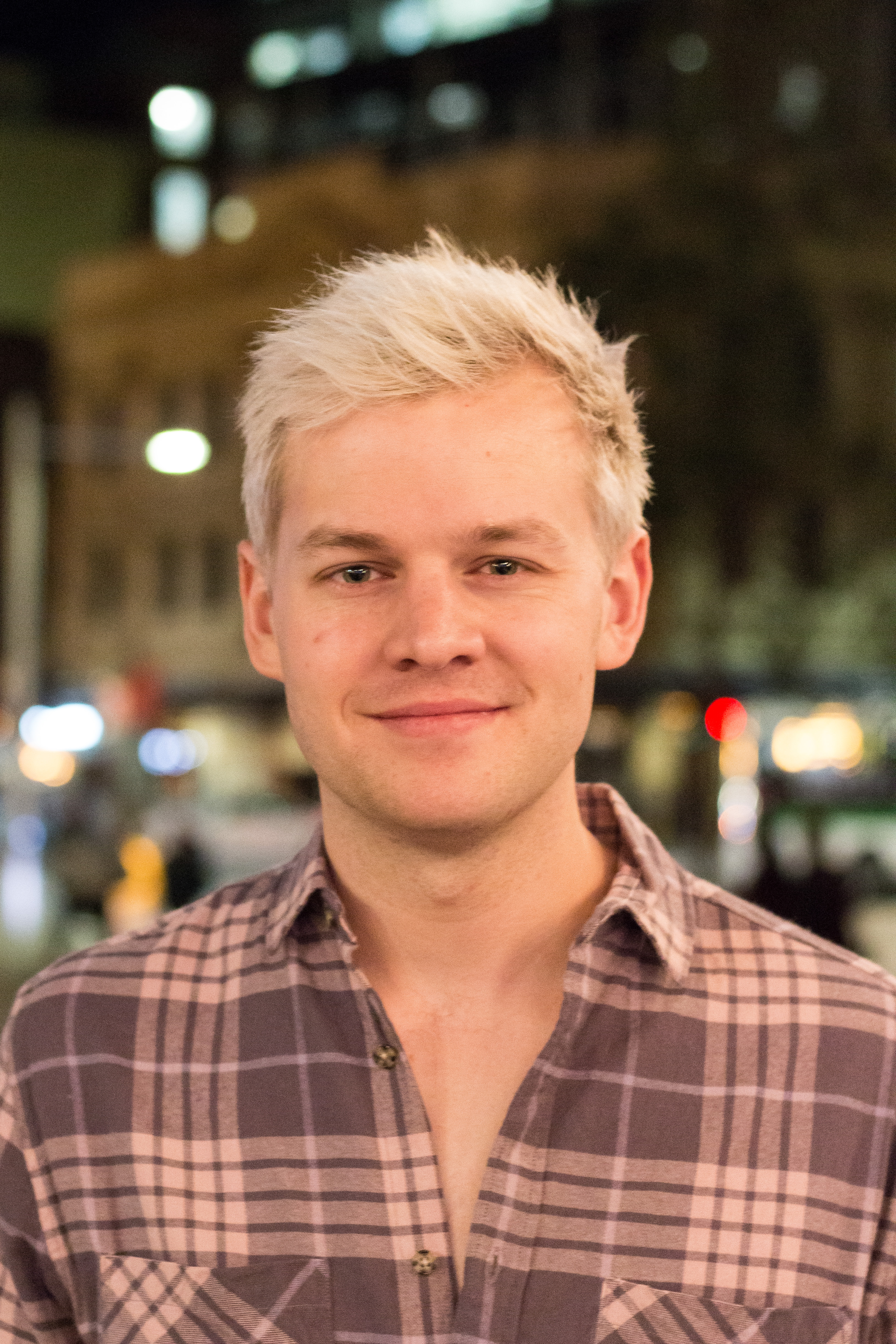
Joel Creasey first appeared as Mick in January.

Mick comes to Harold's Café for a coffee, where Aaron Brennan (Matt Wilson) recognises him as his stalker from his time in dance troupe Rough Trade. Rory Zemiro (Ash Williams) later claims that Mick has trashed his motel room, before approaching him at the Erinsbrough Backpackers' for a talk. Mick overhears Elly Conway (Jodi Anasta) and Paige Smith (Olympia Valance) discussing Rough Trade and he introduces himself. He tells them that he is a big fan of Rory and not Aaron, as they were led to believe. He also tells them that he and Rory used to have sex, while Rory was dating Aaron. Two years later, during Sydney Mardi Gras, Mick sees Aaron and his partner David Tanaka (Takaya Honda) taking a selfie together and photobombs them. Mick tells them that he recognised Aaron's walk and followed them, before asking what their plans are. Aaron and David then run off down the street and hide from Mick.

The following year, Mick is hired as the front desk manager at Lassiters Hotel and states that he prefers to be called Michel now. He briefly recognises Chloe Brennan's (April Rose Pengilly) surname, before going on a tour of the hotel with Harlow Robinson (Jemma Donovan). Mick later sees Chloe with Aaron and he ducks behind a bush to avoid him. When Mick asks Harlow to organise a birthday celebration for him, she asks him why he applied for a job in a hotel when he has no previous experience. Chloe then confronts Mick about asking a guest to cover up on their way to the pool, but Harlow saves him by saying that he meant for the guest to cover themselves in sunscreen. Mick later tells Chloe about his ideas for redecorating the outdoor areas in a jungle theme, but Chloe tells him that she would prefer him to learn the basics of his job first. Mick later enters Amy Greenwood's (Jacinta Stapleton) apartment while drunk and tells her that he was given the wrong key. He also notices some medicated STD cream on the kitchen bench. Amy soon realises that Mick is squatting in the apartments and took the master key from reception. She threatens to tell Chloe, who has been gathering evidence of Mick's indiscretions, and he counters by threatening to reveal that she has crabs. Mick suggests several ways to improve the hotel, but Chloe tells him that he needs to tone down his ideas. Mick then tries to convince Toadfish Rebecchi (Ryan Moloney) to turn his office into a Santa's grotto, before he runs into David, who asks whether he is after Aaron. Mick assures him that Aaron is not his type anymore and that he wants to keep their history a secret. Chloe later confronts him about stalking Aaron, having learned who he is. Mick wears a crab costume to the Lassiters Christmas party amidst a potential crabs outbreak at the hotel, which attracts the attentions of Amy, Chloe and manager Terese Willis (Rebekah Elmaloglou). Hotel owner Paul Robinson (Stefan Dennis) eventually tells Mick to change, while Amy tells him to stop him shaming her.

When Chloe and Harlow ask Amy for information about the issue at Lassiters, Amy assumes Mick has told them about her having crabs, so she tells them about him squatting at the apartments. Mick then publicly announces that Amy and her boyfriends Ned Willis (Ben Hall) and Levi Canning (Richie Morris) are responsible for spreading the crabs at the hotel, which later turns out to be bed bugs. After being fired, Mick attempts to take a bag of toiletries and stationary from the hotel, but is caught by Chloe and Harlow on the way out. A couple of weeks later, Kyle Canning (Chris Milligan) hires Mick as his and Roxy Willis' (Zima Anderson) wedding planner. Roxy is set to fire Mick, until he shows her a mood board he has worked on, which seems to match the couple's personalities. Roxy is still unsure, but is convinced to keep Mick on when he demonstrates that he knows her better than she thinks and tells her that he can pull anything together quickly. Mick later discusses his new job with Karl Kennedy (Alan Fletcher) and hires him to be the wedding singer. Mick's arrangements fall through and Kyle and Roxy's friends and family sort out the venue together. Months later, Terese and Chloe arrange a meeting with fashion designer Montana Marcel's (Tammin Sursok) assistant and are surprised when Mick turns up. He asks for a massage and a cocktail while Terese and Chloe try to explain their pitch for Montana's Fashion Week. He eventually agrees to arrange a meeting with Montana for them. Mick gives Terese, Chloe and Leo Tanaka (Tim Kano) some suggestions to impress Montana, including adding tiki torches, gladioli, and an ice sculpture to the potential locations for the runways. He accompanies Montana on her visit and it emerges all the things Mick suggested remind Montana of being jilted by her fiancé. Chloe realises that Mick set them up and confronts him, but he wishes her good luck proving it. Mick visits Aaron at the hospital, after an unsuccessful date with porter Dean Covey (Travis Cotton). He tells Aaron that Dean would not stop talking about David and came to warn Aaron. Mick later finds Montana entertaining Leo and she threatens to fire him for sabotaging the Lassiters pitch. He says that it was just a test and Montana tells him that it is lucky he makes her laugh, before asking him to leave them alone.

== Rafael Humphreys ==
Rafael Humphreys
- Neighbours character
- Portrayed by: Ryan Thomas
- First appearance: 12 February 2018
- Last appearance: 2 April 2018
- Introduced by: Jason Herbison
In-universe information
- Occupation: Barman
- Mother: Maria Silva

Rafael Humphreys, played by Ryan Thomas, made his first appearance on 12 February 2018. The character and Thomas's casting details were announced on 12 October 2017. Unconfirmed reports of his casting were previously published in early September 2017. Thomas explained that he was on holiday when his agent contacted him about the role. After speaking with a producer, he accepted the part as the character was different to those he had played before. He added "I grew up watching the show so to get the chance to join the cast is amazing". Johnathon Hughes of Radio Times observed that Thomas's casting was "a canny coup" for the show, as a well known soap actor would please British viewers. Thomas finished filming his guest stint during the week commencing 20 November 2017.

Rafael was initially billed as being "a mysterious loner with dark secrets", who comes to Erinsborough to confront an incident from his past. Greg Barnett, the commissioning editor at Channel 5, described Thomas as "the perfect handsome devil", whose arrival would bring "darker times" to an established character. Thomas was photographed with actors Olympia Valance and Andrew Morley on set, leading Hughes to speculate that Rafael may be involved with their characters Paige Smith and Jack Callahan. He was also pictured filming scenes with Matt Wilson, who plays Aaron Brennan. Publicity photos later showed Rafael with scars covering his back and it was revealed that he is set to target Paul Robinson (Stefan Dennis) in a revenge storyline.

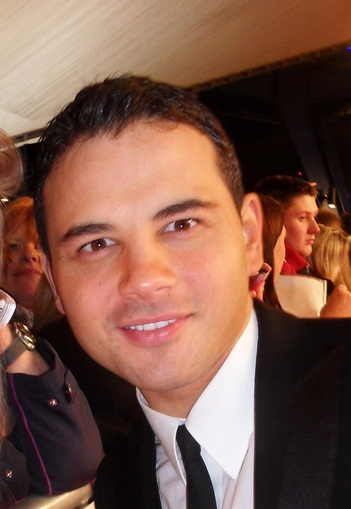
British actor Ryan Thomas plays Rafael.

Rafael visits the Lassiters Complex amid a 90s fancy dress party. He goes to The Waterhole and watches Paul Robinson from afar. After noticing that Paul has left his penthouse key card behind, Rafael takes it and lets himself into the penthouse. He watches on while Paul sleeps. Rafael checks into the Erinsborough Backpackers, and later enquires about a staff wanted poster in the pub. Sheila Canning (Colette Mann) gives him a trial shift. He befriends David Tanaka (Takaya Honda) after helping out with his mixed up meal order, and Sheila is impressed enough to hire him. Rafael asks Sheila about Paul and learns he owns a new housing development called Robinson Heights. David tries to flirt with Rafael and later asks him out for a drink. Rafael tells David that he was born in the UK, but spent a lot of time in South America as that is where his mother was born. Sheila lets Rafael know that David is Paul's son, so he cuts the date short and leaves. Rafael reports Robinson Heights for unsafe work practices. Mishti Sharma (Scarlet Vas) catches Rafael breaking into the building site and he asks her to charge Paul with murder. He explains that his mother died during a fire in a factory owned by Paul. He gleaned from his mother's diary that the factory was unsafe, so he blames Paul for her death. Mishti later tells Rafael that she has been unable to find anything to support his claim, and there is nothing she can do.

Rafael apologises to David and asks him out on another date. David invites Rafael to spend the evening with him at Paul's penthouse, where he is babysitting Gabriel Smith (Kian Bafekrpour). When David goes to check on Gabe, Rafael finds a folder on Robinson Heights and photographs the documentation, including a page about a reimbursement scheme for the former residents, which he then sends to the West Waratah Star newspaper. The paper runs a story about the housing development ripping off pensioners, and Rafael assures David that he did not say anything. Rafael tries to talk to Jayden Warley (Kahn Oxenham) about the safety at Robinson Heights and is overheard by Jayden's mother Sue Parker (Sue Gorman), who wants to know why Rafael is asking questions about Paul's interests. They plot to cause an accident at the site. Paul invites Rafael to a family celebration. When he is alone with David, Rafael shows him his scars and they have sex. Jayden reveals to Rafael that he has been sabotaging the Robinson Heights site for weeks on his mother's orders. Rafael contacts Sue to call off their arrangement, but as he reaches the site, he finds David's brother Leo Tanaka (Tim Kano) trapped under a fallen concrete slab. Rafael starts to call an ambulance, but leaves when Mark Brennan (Scott McGregor) comes across the scene.

Aaron Brennan questions Rafael about Jayden, but Rafael says he does not know him and accuses Aaron of being jealous of his relationship with David. Rafael later catches Aaron going through his belongings and Aaron asks him why he has Sue Parker's business card. Aaron knows that Sue hates Paul and believes Rafael is dating David to get to Paul. Aaron follows Rafael outside and grabs his shirt, which rips and exposes Rafael's scars. Rafael, Sue and Jayden are questioned by the police and Rafael admits to his involvement in the accident at the building site. Paul bails Rafael out and tells him that he does not recall Rafael's mother or the fire, but vows to find out what happened. Rafael assures David that his feelings for him are real despite what has happened. Leo meets with Paul's old business partner Dakota Davies (Sheree Murphy) in London and she later sends him a USB stick containing a document in which she admits to start the factory fire to claim the insurance. Rafael apologises to Paul, who offers to pay his $10,000 fine. Rafael decides to return to the UK to find Dakota. Before he leaves, he tells David to consider giving Aaron another chance.

== Chloe Brennan ==
Chloe Brennan, played by April Rose Pengilly, made her first appearance on 27 March 2018. Pengilly's casting and character details were confirmed on 1 March 2018. She secured the role shortly before moving to Los Angeles, stating "I think it's a goal for most Aussie actors to be on one of these iconic Aussie shows that is beloved world wide, but I'd kind of given up on it, my goal was America." Chloe is the sister of the established Brennan brothers; Mark (Scott McGregor), Aaron (Matt Wilson), and Tyler (Travis Burns). She has been mentioned on-screen by her family several times, and Wilson teased her introduction in July 2017. Chloe comes to Erinsborough to see her brothers, after spending years travelling overseas. Of her character, Pengilly said "Chloe Brennan is one of the most fun, interesting roles I've ever been offered and I'm already having a ball playing her." For her portrayal of Chloe, Pengilly was nominated for Best Soap Newcomer at the 2018 Digital Spy Reader Awards; she came in sixth place with 5.9% of the total votes.

== Bea Nilsson ==
Beatrix "Bea" Nilsson, played by Bonnie Anderson, made her first appearance on 18 May 2018. Anderson's casting details were announced on 5 May. She was initially contracted for two years and the show marks her first major acting role. Anderson auditioned for the role of Chloe Brennan, and was being considered for the part alongside April Rose Pengilly before producers decided to create the additional role of Bea for her. Of her casting, Anderson commented, "I do pinch myself, this is an amazing job to have, even though I started filming in February, it still feels surreal being on set, seeing how it all happens and being a part of it." Bea is the estranged half-sister of Elly Conway (Jodi Anasta) and Susan Kennedy's (Jackie Woodburne) niece. Megan Davies of Digital Spy stated that Bea and Elly have "a tempestuous history", and Elly worries that her sister will turn her life upside down, especially as Bea has "a dark past".

== Hugo Rebecchi ==
Hugo Rebecchi
- Neighbours character
- Portrayed by: John Turner (2018–2022); Tanner Ellis-Anderson (2023–2024)
- Duration: 2018–2024
- First appearance: 26 June 2018
- Last appearance: 5 December 2024
- Introduced by: Jason Herbison
In-universe information
- Other names: Hugo Rebecchi
- Father: Toadie Rebecchi
- Mother: Andrea Somers
- Adoptive mother: Sonya Rebecchi
- Half-brothers: Callum Rebecchi (adoptive)
- Half-sisters: Willow Somers; Nell Rebecchi
- Grandmothers: Heather Schilling; Angie Rebecchi
- Uncles: Shane Rebecchi
- Aunts: Dee Bliss; Jade Mitchell (adoptive)
- First cousins: Yashvi Rebecchi; Jay Rebecchi; Kirsha Rebecchi

Hugo Rebecchi (also Hugo Somers), played by John Turner until 2022 and by Tanner Ellis-Anderson until 2024, made his first appearance on 26 June 2018. Hugo is Toadie Rebecchi (Ryan Moloney) and Andrea Somers' (Madeleine West) infant son, who was conceived the previous year. Hugo is introduced to facilitate the return of West as Andrea and further develop the Rebecchi family. According to Daniel Kilkelly of Digital Spy, Hugo's presence allowed the manipulative Andrea to show a "more human side".

Sindi Watts (Marisa Warrington) brings Hugo to Erinsborough and tells Toadie Rebecchi that he is Hugo's father. Willow Somers (Mieke Billing-Smith), who previously knew of Hugo's existence, tells Toadie and his wife, Sonya Rebecchi (Eve Morey), that Hugo is a result of Toadie and Andrea Somers' affair the previous year. She reveals details of Andrea's pregnancy and subsequent post-natal depression, culminating in her abandoning Hugo with Sindi. Toadie takes a DNA test and cares for Hugo as he waits for the result, which eventually confirms that Toadie is Hugo's father. Toadie takes Hugo and Willow to visit Andrea in a psychiatric hospital in Hobart, but she does not acknowledge her children. Sonya attempts to bond with Hugo, but whilst changing Hugo, she is distracted and Hugo falls from the change table, but is not badly hurt. Toadie and Sonya hold a naming day for Hugo to officially welcome him to their family, and they give him the nickname Sunfish as per Rebecchi family tradition. Later, Andrea's mother, Heather Schilling (Kerry Armstrong), tricks the Rebecchis into hiring her as a live-in nanny, in an attempt to get closer to Hugo and eventually restore Andrea's role in his life, but her deception is uncovered when she attempts to murder Sonya. While still in recovery, Andrea gives full custody of Hugo to Toadie and Sonya, however Sonya shortly dies of ovarian cancer. In 2020, Andrea escapes from prison by dressing up her identical twin, Dee Bliss (also West). She then pretends to be Dee and takes Hugo, before escaping town with Owen Campbell (Johnny Ruffo). Owen eventually admits to Toadie where Andrea, who is still holding Hugo, is hiding. Using Heather, Constable Levi Canning (Richie Morris) lures Andrea into Erinsborough High and Toadie safely manages to get Hugo back.

Three years later, following Toadie's wedding to Terese Willis (Rebekah Elmaloglou), Hugo is told by his sister, Nell (Ayisha Salem-Towner), that she opposes their marriage. Nell tries to convince Hugo that Toadie is better suited to Melanie Pearson (Lucinda Cowden), to whom he married a year earlier. When Hugo is rummaging through Melanie's belongings that Nell has kept, Terese finds him and forces Nell to explain herself. Several months later, Hugo is kidnapped by Slade Westall (Charlie Di Stefano) and thrown into the boot of his car. Slade later abandons the car when its tire pops and Hugo is later found by Aaron Brennan (Matt Wilson).

== Jemima Davies-Smythe ==
Jemima Davies-Smythe
- Neighbours character
- Portrayed by: Magda Szubanski
- First appearance: 3 September 2018
- Last appearance: 27 September 2018
- Introduced by: Jason Herbison
In-universe information
- Father: Ronald Davies-Smythe
- Half-brothers: Karl Kennedy
- Daughters: Trudy Callhoun
- Grandsons: Jasper
- Grandfathers: Peter Davies
- Grandmothers: Elizabeth Smythe

Jemima Davies-Smythe, played by Magda Szubanski, made her first appearance on 3 September 2018. The character and Szubanski's casting details were announced on 30 May 2018, along with details of the show's first same-sex wedding. Of her guest role, Szubanski said, "I thought it was just one of the best offers I've had for a long time. I thought it was both hilarious and historic so when they asked me I just jumped at it. I think it's gold." Szubanski, who led the "yes" campaign for marriage equality law in Australia, plays marriage celebrant Jemima, who marries David Tanaka (Takaya Honda) and Aaron Brennan (Matt Wilson). Jemima is also revealed to have a connection to "Ramsay Street royalty". It was later confirmed that she is Karl Kennedy's (Alan Fletcher) half-sister. Anna Brain of the Herald Sun praised Szubanski's appearance, saying "it's been a treat to have her on Ramsay Street".

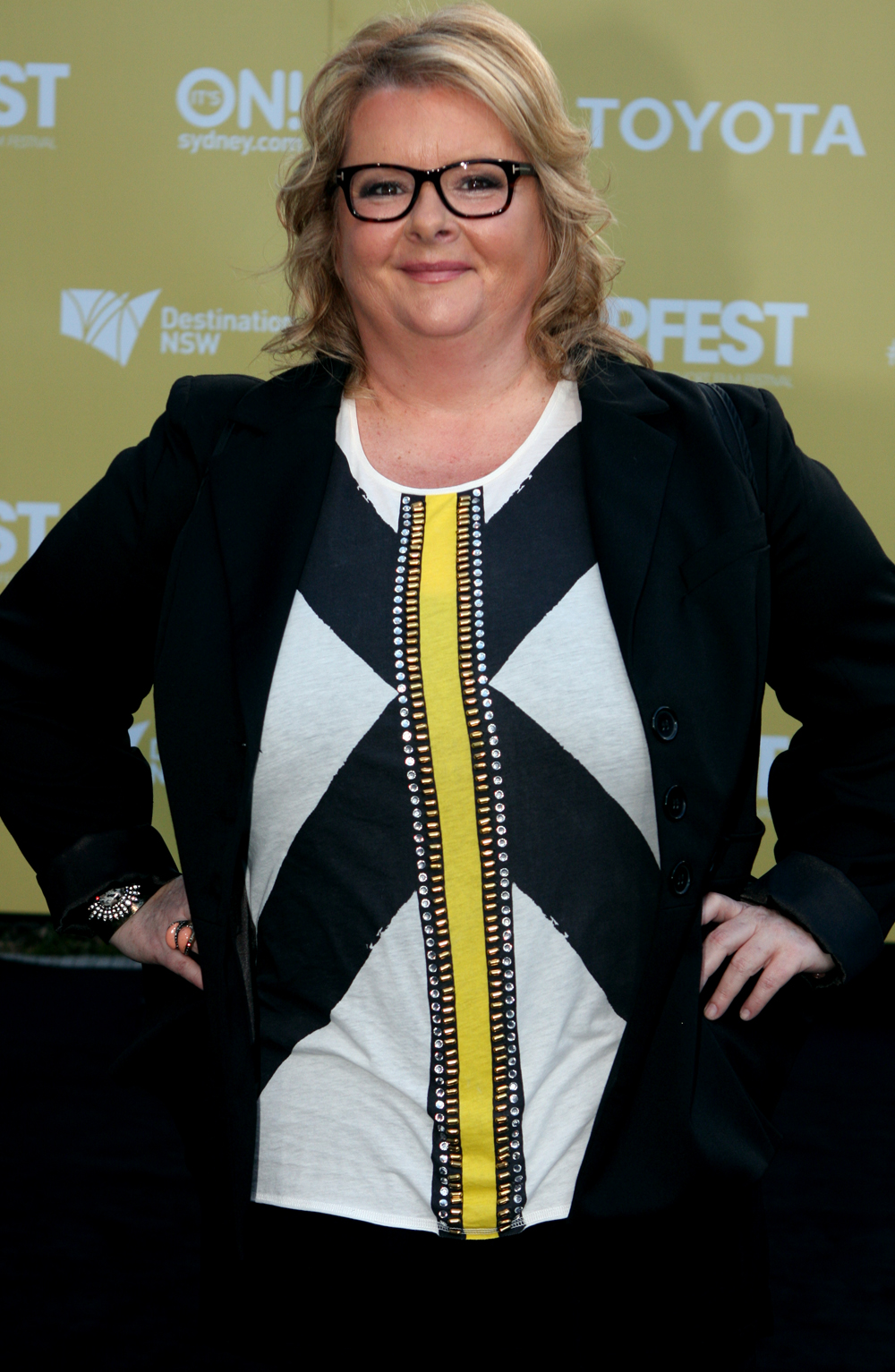
Magda Szubanski was introduced as Jemima in September.

Jemima is contacted by her half-brother Karl Kennedy, but she tells him she does not want to meet him. However, she later travels to his home town of Erinsborough, where she overhears that Aaron Brennan and David Tanaka need a celebrant. Jemima steps in for Susan Kennedy (Jackie Woodburne) and uses her speech. After the wedding, Jemima finds that the front grill of her car fell off when Susan leant against it. Karl offers to cover the cost and gives Jemima a business card, leading her to realise that he is her half-brother. Karl explains that he and Susan went to Echuca to find her, but Jemima says that she was not sure if she wanted to meet another half-sibling. Karl invites Jemima to stay with him and Susan, and they bond over their shared love of music. Susan starts to suspect that Jemima is a freeloader when she forgets her purse while out to lunch more than once, and allows Karl to pay for further repairs to her car.

Jemima befriends Sheila Canning (Colette Mann) when she offers to teach her how to speed read. They also bond over the fact that Susan appears to look down on them. Paul Robinson (Stefan Dennis) recognises Jemima and tells her that he knows her secret. They have lunch together, and Jemima overhears Susan telling Paul that she is a gold digger. Jemima redecorates Number 28 in the Danish Hygge style. She later encourages Karl to knock down some shelving units at the house. However, Susan is not pleased and asks Jemima to leave. When Karl refuses to throw his sister out, Jemima realises she can trust him and reveals that she is a multi-millionaire. Jemima explains that she earns money from a song she wrote about riding the tram, which was something she used to do with her father. Jemima plans to stay in Erinsborough, which prompts Susan to tell Jemima that she was hurt when Jemima changed the words to her speech at Aaron and David's wedding. Susan also apologises for calling her a gold digger and they make up. Jemima then announces that she wants to take care of Karl and Susan financially. After receiving a call from her daughter, Trudy, Jemima explains to Susan that Trudy and her grandson are just after her money. Karl and Susan turn down Jemima's offer, as Karl believes her money has poisoned her relationships. Susan encourages Jemima to reconcile with her daughter, and Jemima decides to visit her in Boston. Karl and Susan wave Jemima off from the hotel and discover she has gifted them a toy tram.

== Nance Sluggett ==
Nance Sluggett
- Neighbours character
- Portrayed by: Denise Drysdale
- First appearance: 3 October 2018
- Last appearance: 12 October 2018
- Introduced by: Jason Herbison
In-universe information
- Sons: Jeremy Sluggett

Nance Sluggett, played by Denise Drysdale, made her first appearance on 3 October 2018. Drysdale's casting details were announced on 27 June 2018. She began filming her first scenes that same week. Of joining the cast, Drysdale said "I am very, very excited about it! I have been around as long as the show so to be finally doing a role on it is quite an honour and everyone has been so welcoming."

The identity of Drysdale's character was not immediately released. But Sophie Dainty of Digital Spy reported that she would "make life very difficult for a particular local resident." The serial's executive producer Jason Herbison said the character would be "eccentric" and will perplex viewers "with her antics." On 24 September, it was announced that Drysdale would be playing Nance Sluggett, the mother of criminal Jeremy Sluggett (Tamblyn Lord). She comes to the Flametree Retreat to collect $100,000 that Jeremy left with Gary Canning (Damien Richardson). But when Gary admits that he has spent the money, Nance asks for free treatments in return for keeping her son off Gary's back. Dainty's colleague Daniel Kilkelly wondered if Nance and Gary's arrangement would become something more, saying, "With a flirtatious look in her eye, could Nance also have more than just treatments on her mind?"

Nance comes to The Flametree Retreat to collect her son, Jeremy's money from Gary Canning. He attempts to put her off, but Nance realises that he has spent the money. Gary explains that he paid for his daughter's university fees. Nance asks Gary to give her a foot rub, while she thinks about what to do. Nance invites Susan Kennedy (Jackie Woodburne) to join her. Nance continues to receive free treatments from Gary. A few weeks later, Nance returns to collect the money, as Jeremy is up for parole. But she then informs Gary that she can stop Jeremy from getting parole if Gary gives her a job as assistant manager at the retreat. Nance clashes with Gary's mother Sheila Canning (Colette Mann), leading her to cancel the deal with Gary.

== Pierce Greyson ==
Pierce Greyson, played by Tim Robards, made his first appearance on 5 October 2018. The character and casting details were announced on 19 July 2018. The show's executive producer Jason Herbison stated that Robards went through "a full audition process" and worked with several of the show's actors, before he was cast. Robards commented, "I've been putting in the work behind closed doors with different coaches – pushing myself out my comfort zone and then this role came up so I'm super excited. I watched Neighbours as a kid so to be on the set with such iconic characters like Paul Robinson, Toadie and Susan is an amazing experience – the entire cast and crew have been so welcoming." Pierce is a rich investor, who is billed as being a mix of Harvey Specter, Christian Grey and Robert Redford. Mat Whitehead of Ten Daily commented, "Pierce Greyson – which is exactly the sort of name you'd expect for someone who is as handsome as he may be mysterious – Robards is set to 'arrive in style'." Pierce also finds romance during his time in Erinsborough. The character departed on 19 November 2018, but on 14 February 2019, Robards announced that he would be reprising the role and joining the full-time cast.

== Andrew Rodwell ==
Andrew Rodwell
- Neighbours character
- Portrayed by: David Lamb (2018–2019); Lloyd Will (2020–2025)
- Duration: 2018–2025
- First appearance: 23 October 2018
- Last appearance: 11 December 2025
- Introduced by: Jason Herbison
In-universe information
- Occupation: Police sergeant
- Father: Steven Brook
- Brothers: Felix Rodwell (adoptive)
- Sisters: Gretchen Brook
- Wife: Wendy Rodwell
- Daughters: Sadie Rodwell
- Nephews: JJ Varga-Murphy

Andrew Rodwell, played by David Lamb and later Lloyd Will, made his first appearance on 23 October 2018. Will assumed the role off Lamb after Andrew's third appearance. Andrew is introduced as the local Erinsborough police lieutenant and later sergeant. Andrew continues to make appearances in a guest capacity until 2022, as his wife, Wendy Rodwell (Candice Leask), and his daughter, Sadie Rodwell (Emerald Chan), are gradually introduced. Neighbours executive producer, Jason Herbison, revealed plans for a new family, by saying, "We also have a new family moving into the street." On screen, viewers see Andrew and Wendy eventually decide to buy 26 Ramsay Street. Will, Leask and Chan were then added to the opening titles. Will revealed in an interview, "My character was just a tiny little daily for two episodes and I thought that was going to be it. And then I just kept getting invited back, and every time, you know, there was something going down at the police station, I was just invited back. And then I got a promotion to being a sergeant and they were like, 'By the way, you've got a family.' And then I'm like, 'Really? Okay, cool, sweet.'" Will also praised the crew members for styling the Rodwell house "very well." Script producer Shane Isheev later revealed that more of Andrew's children would have been introduced if it were not for the serial's cancellation. The character's final appearance aired on 28 July 2022 as part of the serial's finale, with Daniel Kilkelly of Digital Spy saying, "It's a real shame that we won't get to see more stories for the Rodwells." The character's return in the renewed series however was confirmed on 27 April 2023. Producers introduced Andrew's brother Felix (James Beaufort) in March 2024.

In 2025, Andrew and Holly's "controversial affair" received a "Best Soap Storyline" nomination at the Digital Spy Reader Awards.

Andrew stands guard outside Cassius Grady's (Joe Davidson) hospital room. When Sheila Canning (Colette Mann) notices Andrew yawning, she convinces him to briefly leave his post and get a coffee. The following year, he is assigned to guard the amnesiac Finn Kelly (Rob Mills), including on a visit to Ramsay Street. In 2020, he informs Hendrix Greyson (Ben Turland) that he faces a fine and licence ban for illegally driving his father's car. In 2021, Andrew and Yashvi Rebecchi (Olivia Junkeer) track down Kane Jones (Barry Conrad) and arrest him. At the station, they question Kane about his crimes and the kidnapping of Harlow Robinson (Jemma Donnovan). Andrew and Levi Canning (Richie Morris) investigate an assault on Roxy Willis (Zima Anderson) at Eden Hills University a few weeks later. Andrew tells Levi and Bea Nilsson (Bonnie Anderson) that there are no cameras and no witnesses, before Levi finds a distinctive ring in the undergrowth. Andrew later arrests Brent Colefax (Texas Watterston) with the help of Kurt Bridges (Jeff Gobbels). Weeks later, Levi congratulates Andrew on his promotion to sergeant. Andrew asks why Levi is at work when he is supposed to be on leave and Levi tells him he just wanted to check out the noticeboard for anything new. Later, Andrew informs Rose Walker (Lucy Durack) that her recently smashed in car windscreen was broken by Anna Buke (Fiona Macleod), who was under the impression that it was Melanie Pearson's (Lucinda Cowden) car.

When Isla Tanaka-Brennan (Mary Finn; Axelle Austin) is taken from her car, Andrew questions Aaron Brennan (Matt Wilson) and David Tanaka (Takaya Honda). When Andrew asks Levi if he has plans with his partners, Levi explains that he does not have partners, but rather his girlfriend, Amy Greenwood (Jacinta Stapleton), has another boyfriend. The following day, Andrew hands Levi a photoshopped image of Levi and Ned Willis (Ben Hall) that he found taped to Levi's locker. Rodwell asks Levi if he wants to make an official complaint, but Levi refuses as he does not want to encourage his colleagues. Two months later, Rodwell attends the Erinsborough police ball with his wife, Wendy Rodwell, where he kicks out Levi, Ned, Amy and Reuben Elliot (Lee Jankowski), after they almost get into a fight. Later, Rodwell allows Levi to take Freya Wozniak (Phoebe Roberts) on a joy ride in a police car. A few days later, Rodwell picks up Amy's daughter, Zara Selwyn (Freya Van Dyke), to hang out with his daughter, Sadie Rodwell. After a fire at Erinsborough High School, Rodwell attempts to reassure Sadie before her police interview, however later discovers that Sadie was the culprit. Shortly after, he and Wendy purchase 26 Ramsay Street from Sheila, although Kyle Canning (Chris Milligan) attempts to talk him out of the sale. Andrew helps his daughter find closure after Hendrix Greyson (Ben Turland) dies from lingering effects of the fire. Weeks later, Andrew finds Sadie knocked unconscious after she is hit on the head by Corey Smythe-Jones (Laurence Boxhall). The Rodwells decide to put their house up for sale, but later renounce the sale. Andrew attends Melanie and Toadie Rebecchi's (Ryan Moloney) wedding and reception party on Ramsay Street.

== Heather Schilling ==
Heather Schilling
- Neighbours character
- Portrayed by: Kerry Armstrong
- Duration: 2018–2020
- First appearance: 25 October 2018
- Last appearance: 23 June 2020
- Introduced by: Jason Herbison
In-universe information
- Other names: Alice Wells
- Occupation: Nanny
- Daughters: Dee Bliss; Andrea Somers
- Grandsons: Hugo Somers
- Granddaughters: Willow Somers

Heather Schilling (also credited as Alice Wells), played by Kerry Armstrong, made her first appearance on 25 October 2018. Armstrong's casting and character details were announced on 27 August. Of joining the cast, the actress stated "It is not often you get to be so creative in your own backyard so when the producers asked me to play the role of Alice Wells in Neighbours it was simply irresistible." Alice was billed as a "demure and kind-hearted shortbread baking" grandmother, who shows a darker side when she comes up with "a shocking plan" for one of the show's families. Armstrong said Alice would push boundaries, and the actress was encouraged by the producers to see how far she could go with her character. In the November 2018 issue of Soap World, it was revealed that Alice is Andrea Somers' (Madeleine West) mother. After she helps with their children, Sonya Rebecchi (Eve Morey) and Toadfish Rebecchi (Ryan Moloney) hire Alice as a live-in nanny. Armstrong reprised the role on 17 June 2019. The following month it was confirmed that Heather is also the biological mother of Dee Bliss (West), who was adopted by the Bliss family. Armstrong reprised the role the following year, and Heather returns on 18 May 2020.

Heather notices Sonya Rebecchi struggling with her children Nell and Hugo in Harold's Store, and helps her out by taking Nell to the toilet. She introduces herself as Alice Wells and offers to watch the children as Sonya works from home. Sonya and Toadie take Alice out to The Waterhole for a drink to say thank you. Alice explains that she came to pack up her daughter's belongings, after she went overseas, and Alice plans to reunite with her grandchildren, who she has not seen in a long time. Sonya and Toadie ask Alice if she would consider babysitting their children again, and she suggests that she could be a live-in nanny and they hire her. It emerges that Alice is Hugo's grandmother and Andrea Somers' mother, the woman who conned the Rebecchis. Alice begins manipulating the Rebecchis, convincing Toadie to pay for expensive treatment for Andrea and to keep it from Sonya, which causes an argument. She later convinces Nell to hide during a Halloween event, and pretends that she does not know where she is, sparking a search. Alice then calls the DHS, who question Toadie and Sonya. When Toadie tells Alice that her services are no longer needed, as Nell and Hugo have daycare places, Alice gives Nell food poisoning to keep her job. Alice manipulates Nell into saying that she wants to stay with her, instead of going to daycare.

Alice listens in on Sonya's AA meeting and learns that she is scared to take medication for a tension headache, so Alice crushes up some painkillers into a drink for her. Alice later visits Andrea to tell her about her plan to split Toadie and Sonya up, while Toadie learns from Andrea's daughter Willow Somers (Mieke Billing-Smith), that her grandmother is also a scam artist called Heather Schilling. Alice fakes a hand injury to get Codeine, which she secretly feeds to Sonya so she will develop a dependency on it. Alice deliberately hits her hand with a rolling pin to gain more painkillers, and suggests to Sonya's sister-in-law that Sonya is drinking again. She also learns that Toadie and Sonya are searching for Andrea's mother, and are expecting some information from a private detective. Alice strikes Toadie's assistant Piper Willis (Mavournee Hazel) over the head with a crowbar and steals the envelope containing Andrea's file. Alice amends the file to say that Andrea's mother is dead. She then stops giving Sonya the painkillers so that she develops withdrawal symptoms. Sonya becomes sick and is hospitalised after becoming dehydrated.

After Alice overhears Toadie declaring his love for Sonya, she decides to kill Sonya so Toadie will be free for Andrea. Alice soaks Sonya's gardening gloves in pesticide and then encourages her to work at the nursery, so she has to wear them. During a food break, Sonya licks her fingers and ingests the pesticide. She becomes seriously ill and asks Alice to pull over. Alice refuses to call an ambulance and watches as Sonya passes out. When she comes to, Alice explains that she had to poison her, as she wanted herself, Toadie, Hugo and Andrea to be a family. Alice apologises and then leaves Sonya to die. Willow comes to visit Toadie and Sonya, and finds her grandmother Heather posing as their nanny. Heather tells her about her plan and when she catches Willow texting Toadie, she locks Willow in the shed at the nursery. Heather flees Erinsborough and learns from Willow that Sonya has been found alive. She visits Andrea to tell her that her plan has gone wrong. When Andrea becomes upset, Heather tells her that when the time is right, she must tell Toadie about the person at the Salamanca Markets.

Months later, Heather surprises Andrea at her apartment in Geelong, having been kicked out of her friend's home. Andrea urges her to hide in the bathroom to avoid being seen by Willow. Heather overhears Willow mentioning that she used to lock Andrea up, and confronts Andrea about her lies when they are alone. Andrea allows Heather to stay at her apartment, while she moves into Lassiters, and urges her to lay low. However, Heather comes to Erinsborough and sees Andrea arguing with Ian Packer (Nathan Carter). Andrea later tells her mother that the police are ramping up their search for her, before learning she has been visiting Erinsborough. Heather copies down Ian's number from Andrea's phone, and later seduces him for information about Karen, the woman that Andrea looks like. Andrea catches them together and berates her mother, telling her that Karen is not a threat. She also asks Heather about a red-headed woman she recalled during her hypnotherapy session. Ian later returns and Heather asks him to keep their relationship a secret from Andrea. She then convinces Ian to tell her where Karen is, as she wants to make sure she will not return and ruin Andrea's life.

Heather travels to Byron Bay with Andrea following, and sets up a meeting with 'Karen' who is revealed to be Dee, resulting in Andrea pushing her off a cliff. Dee poses as Andrea so she can convince Heather to return to Erinsborough and Heather and Andrea are arrested. It is later learned that Heather is Andrea and Dee's mum, she recalls having given birth to two babies in which one was unknowingly taken from her by a nun and given to the Bliss family. Although Heather is remorseful for her actions, Dee decides to cut all ties with Heather and Andrea, and they are left in prison.

A year later, while visiting Andrea, Dee notices Heather walking through the prison and decides to organise a visit. Although Heather continues to show remorse for her past, Dee's decision to continually visit her angers Toadie. When he tries to prevent them from seeing each other, Dee becomes annoyed and after a series of issues, they break up. Meanwhile, Andrea vents her anger about not being able to see Hugo to Heather, who refuses to help her in any scheme. Dee asks Heather about her and Andrea's biological father, but Heather claims not to remember him. She later tells Karl Kennedy (Alan Fletcher) that his name is Peter Wilson. On another of Dee's visits, prison guard Owen Campbell (Johnny Ruffo) helps Andrea to escape by drugging Dee, so Andrea can change into her clothes. When Dee wakes up, Heather realises she is not Andrea. She and Toadie eventually convince the prison staff that Andrea has escaped. After learning that Andrea has taken Hugo, Heather works with the police to get him back. She contacts Andrea and tells her she is also on the run. They arrange to meet at Erinsborough High School, where Andrea is arrested and Hugo returned to Toadie. Although Toadie thanks her, he later visits Heather and says that he blames Dee's decision to reconnect with her for Andrea's actions. Heather later arranges a prison transfer due to this, and Dee leaves to meet her father Peter in Alaska.

== Valerie Grundy ==
Valerie Grundy
- Neighbours character
- Portrayed by: Patti Newton
- Appears on: 21 December 2018
- Introduced by: Jason Herbison
In-universe information
- Sisters: Vera Punt

Valerie Grundy, played by Patti Newton, appeared on 21 December 2018. Newton's casting was announced on 10 December, while Valerie's appearance had previously been teased in spoilers for the show's 8000th episode. The character's surname is a tribute to Reg Grundy, who produced Neighbours in the 1980s. Valerie is a "shy and reclusive" woman, who has lived in the corner house of Ramsay Street for 34 years. Her death brings the local community together, while Toadfish Rebecchi (Ryan Moloney) goes inside her house and discovers she was a hoarder, who has acquired a variety of items from the residents of the street over the years.

Val greets Aaron Brennan (Matt Wilson) and David Tanaka (Takaya Honda) as she passes through the Lassiters Complex, before Yashvi Rebecchi (Olivia Junkeer) apologises to her for kicking a football over her fence. As Val returns to her home on the corner of Ramsay Street, she waves hello to Toadfish Rebecchi and Piper Willis (Mavournee Hazel), who wonders whether to interview Val for her vlog. Later that day, Piper tells Toadie that she has tried knocking on Val's door, but there was no answer and Val's dog, Regina (Timba), is continuously barking. Piper and Toadie go inside and find that Val has died of a heart attack.

== Delaney Renshaw ==
Delaney Renshaw
- Neighbours character
- Portrayed by: Ella Newton
- Duration: 2018–2019
- First appearance: 21 December 2018
- Last appearance: 17 January 2019
- Introduced by: Jason Herbison
In-universe information
- Father: Raymond Renshaw
- Uncles: Ivan Renshaw

Delaney Renshaw, played by Ella Newton, made her first appearance on 21 December 2018. Newton's casting and character details were announced on 6 December. Delaney is the daughter of a "notorious" Sydney crime family, who have been mentioned on-screen several times since the arrival of Leo Tanaka (Tim Kano) in 2016. Delaney comes to Erinsborough to see Leo after informing him that her father and uncle are up for parole. She also makes it clear that she wants a romantic relationship with him now that she is an adult. Kilkelly branded Delaney "troublesome". Bridget McManus and Melinda Houston of The Sydney Morning Herald called the character a "femme fatale" and said "Delaney (Ella Newton, Harrow) continues to wreak thrilling havoc behind the scenes."

Delaney contacts Leo Tanaka to inform him that her father and uncle will be released from prison soon. Delaney comes to Erinsborough to see Leo and declares her love for him, but Leo tells her that he is in a relationship and nothing is going to happen between them. Delaney stays at Lassiters Hotel and discovers Leo is dating manager Terese Willis (Rebekah Elmaloglou). She propositions him in the hotel sauna, and threatens to tell her father and uncle that he was the person who informed on them if he does not enter into a relationship with her. Leo and his father Paul Robinson (Stefan Dennis) give Delaney a number of free items from the hotel to keep her happy. She later comes to Paul to ask for his help with Leo, and tells him that Mannix Foster (Sam Webb) died as a result of Paul leaving him in the middle of nowhere while injured. She uses the information and a recording made just before Mannix died to blackmail Paul. Leo breaks up with Terese, but is reluctant to be intimate with Delaney. When Terese comes face to face with Leo and Delaney in the elevator, he kisses Delaney to show that he has moved on. Delaney receives a phone call and tells the person on the other end that Leo has no idea what is going on. She later catches Terese with her phone, but Terese tells her that she was just putting it back, after it fell out of her bag.

Delaney tells Leo that her father and uncle got parole, and reveals that she is fearful of seeing her father. Leo spends the night with Delaney, but they do not have sex. He later tells Delaney that he cannot pretend to love her anymore and ends their relationship, as he is in love with Terese. Paul advises Delaney that she cannot make someone love her, and offers her a job with a Lassiters hotel abroad. After seeing Leo beg Terese for a second chance, Delaney returns to her hotel room to find her father Raymond Renshaw (Frank Magree) and uncle Ivan Renshaw (Michael Shanahan) waiting for her. Raymond learns that Delaney came to Erinsborough to see Leo, as she fell in love with him while he was working at the club. She then tells him that Leo was the one who went to the police about the money laundering, not Mannix. Ivan goes off to find Leo and Delaney worries that Ivan will hurt him and refuses to leave with Raymond. Delaney learns that Ivan shot at Leo, but Terese jumped in front of him and took the bullet. Delaney assures Leo that she did not talk to her father or uncle about him. Leo calls Delaney's mystery contact and discovers that it is Mannix, who explains that after Paul dumped him in the bush, he called Delaney, who took him to a motel where he recovered. Delaney also tells Paul that the body he dug up was an associate of Raymond's. Delaney attempts to apologise, but Paul and Leo order her to go. Leo later tells her she is safe from Raymond and Ivan, who are going back to prison. He suggests that she goes and finds her mother to make a fresh start. They hug and Delaney leaves.

== Regina Grundy ==
Regina Grundy
- Neighbours character
- Portrayed by: Timba
- Duration: 2018–2019
- First appearance: 21 December 2018
- Last appearance: 23 January 2019
- Introduced by: Jason Herbison
- Species: Dog
- Breed: French Bulldog
In-universe information
- Owners: Valerie Grundy; Aaron Brennan; David Tanaka; Vera Punt

Regina "Reggie" Grundy, played by Timba, is a French Bulldog, who made her first appearance on 21 December 2018. Daniel Kilkelly of Digital Spy announced on 17 December that a new dog was being introduced to the show during the 8000th episode. Reg initially belongs to Valerie Grundy (Patti Newton), who dies in the episode. After Reg fails to get along with the Rebecchi's dog, Clancy (Rocky), she is adopted by David Tanaka (Takaya Honda) and Aaron Brennan (Matt Wilson). Valerie and Reg were created as a tribute to Reg Grundy, who produced Neighbours in the 1980s. Timba is owned by Wilson. Reggie departed with Valerie's sister on 23 January 2019.

Reggie continuously barks after her owner Valerie Grundy dies, alerting Toadfish Rebecchi (Ryan Moloney) and Piper Willis (Mavournee Hazel), who enter the house and find Val. After Val's body is removed, Yashvi Rebecchi (Olivia Junkeer) convinces her parents to look after Reggie. Aaron Brennan and David Tanaka take Reggie out for a walk, as she is not getting along with the Rebecchi's dog. Piper tells them that she and Toadie have yet to find any of Val's relations, and it is not guaranteed that they would want Reggie. After speaking with Aaron's brother, David adopts Reggie for himself and Aaron, and brings her home to Number 24. While she is left alone, Reggie ransacks various rooms, leading Aaron to find a Christmas card from his sister Chloe Brennan (April Rose Pengilly) to Elly Conway (Jodi Anasta) amongst the rubbish. Reggie is taken from the Lassiters complex, while David is in the cafe. He and Aaron later spot her with Vera Punt (Sally-Anne Upton), who explains that she is Val's sister. David and Aaron are reluctant to let Reggie go, as they have fallen in love with her, but eventually decide to let her leave with Vera, who later moves into 34 Ramsay Street with Reggie.

== Shaun Watkins ==
Shaun Watkins
- Neighbours character
- Portrayed by: Brad Moller
- Duration: 2018–2020
- First appearance: 27 December 2018
- Last appearance: 10 July 2020
- Introduced by: Jason Herbison
In-universe information
- Occupation: School counsellor
- Father: Errol Watkins
- Mother: Claudia Watkins
- Half-brothers: Finn Kelly
- Daughters: Aster Conway

Shaun Watkins, played by Brad Moller, made his first appearance on 27 December 2018. Details of Moller's casting were not announced until his first appearance. Shaun was introduced as the younger half-brother of villain Finn Kelly (Rob Mills). He comes to Erinsborough to meet Susan Kennedy (Jackie Woodburne), and prove to her that Finn was not always bad. Shaun was later shown in a trailer promoting 2019 storylines, and Daniel Kilkelly of Digital Spy questioned if he could be trusted or whether he was "just as freaky as Finn? Only time will tell." Writers also involved Shaun in Elly Conway's (Jodi Anasta) relationship problems. They pair have a one-night stand and Elly falls pregnant with his child, giving him an opportunity for blackmail. In May 2020, it was announced that Moller had reprised the role once again, months after Shaun was declared dead.

Shaun leaves a photo album containing childhood photos of Finn Kelly on the doorstep of Susan Kennedy home. Susan and her husband Karl Kennedy (Alan Fletcher) meet Shaun at the local pub The Waterhole, where he reveals that he is Finn's half-brother. Shaun explains that when he and Finn were younger, they were both kidnapped during a trip to South America. Their mother and Shaun's father paid the ransom for Shaun, but not Finn, as they blamed him for the incident. Finn was held captive for six months, until he was rescued by the military. Shaun hopes that by telling Susan the story, she will understand Finn's actions better. Despite finding no record of the incident, Susan meets with Shaun again, who says it was covered up. He gives her an unopened letter from Finn to their mother that he wrote while he was held hostage. Shaun explains that their mother has had no contact with Finn, while his father blamed Finn for his heart attack. Shaun also says that Finn's anger caused him to do terrible things. Susan's niece Bea Nilsson (Bonnie Anderson) contacts Shaun asking to meet, but her boyfriend Ned Willis (Ben Hall) warns Shaun off and he leaves town.

Shaun returns when Finn wakes from his coma and claims to have retrograde amnesia. Shaun supports Finn when he visits Ramsay Street and meets his victims. Ned confronts Shaun and tells him to take Finn away, but Shaun refuses and Ned punches him. Mark Brennan (Scott McGregor) breaks up the fight, and Shaun press charges against Ned. Shaun and Finn's mother Claudia Watkins (Kate Raison) comes to Erinsborough intending to take Shaun home with her. He tries to convince her to visit Finn. Shaun meets Elly Conway at the Back Lane Bar, and they have a one-night stand. Shaun later learns Elly is pregnant and that he is the father. He uses the information to blackmail her into changing her victim impact statement and convince the Kennedys to house Finn. He leaves for Switzerland after seeing Finn settle in. Weeks later, Finn invites Shaun back to Erinsborough, after Elly's marriage ends. He almost gets into a fight with her husband Mark, who knows he is the father of her baby. Shaun tells Elly that he wants to be a part of his baby's life, but Elly is distant. Shaun attends an art class with Elly and they bond over the baby while they draw. Elly invites him to attend the 12-week scan. Mark asks Shaun about the fire at the police forensics locker, but Shaun assures him that he was not involved as he was in Sydney. After seeing how happy Elly is upon talking to Mark, Shaun goes to see Mark and asks if there is a chance they could get back together. Mark refuses to discuss the issue with him. Shaun tells Elly that he is planning on leaving to give her and Mark space, and will return for the birth. Elly later tells him that she and Mark kissed, so she agrees with his decision to leave. After Shaun tells Finn that he is going, he says his goodbyes to everyone and returns to Switzerland.

Shaun comes to Erinsborough to pull Finn into line, after he falls out with David Tanaka (Takaya Honda) and Aaron Brennan (Matt Wilson) over their involvement in Elly's pregnancy. After Finn apologises to David and Aaron, the four men take a baby swaddling class together. Elly returns from Sydney when Bea is injured, and Shaun comforts her when she gets upset. He asks Elly about them starting a relationship, but she turns him down. David finds custody papers in Shaun's bag and Elly accuses Shaun of trying to take her baby. He explains that his mother had the papers drawn up, but he has no intention of filing them and they tear them up. Shaun tells Finn about a program he ran in Switzerland that pairs disadvantaged children with mentors, and they present the idea to Toadfish Rebecchi (Ryan Moloney) for the Sonya Foundation, however, Toadie tells them that Finn cannot be involved as he will not get police clearance to work with children. After Shaun helps Elly to clean up after the school dance, she kisses him. He returns to Switzerland to begin organising his relocation to Erinsborough. A week later, Finn, Bea and Elly learn that Shaun is missing after being caught up in an avalanche while hiking. Claudia soon informs Finn that the search has been called off following a blizzard, and it is now a retrieval mission, leading Finn to declare that Shaun is dead.

Six months later, Shaun is rescued and flies to Melbourne on Claudia's private jet after realising she was there. Upon arrival he is greeted by her and his daughter Aster Conway (Isla Goulas, Scout Bowman). He reveals that while hiking, he injured his ankle before a blizzard and was forced to stay in a log cabin but was unable to leave due to heavy snowfall posing a risk to his life. Upon inquiring why Aster is with Claudia, he discovers his mother's numerous schemes to take custody away from the Kennedys, Elly and Bea, and how she sent Elly to prison for Finn's murder. He tries to convince her to do the right thing, as Susan and Bea arrive and are shocked by his presence. After Claudia turns herself into the police and was charged, Elly was bailed out of prison. Shaun refuses to forgive Claudia. Shaun reunites with Elly and he temporarily moves in with the Kennedys. Shaun breaks down in front of David, and admits that he misses Finn and is shocked and angry at him for what he has done to the residents of Ramsay Street. Bea tells Shaun that Finn made some video diaries and gives him a copy. Shaun watches them and angrily throws his laptop at Karl's garden shed, in front of Elly. Shaun then throws the memory stick, containing the videos into the lake, before announcing to Elly that he has decided to return to Switzerland to sort himself out. He promises to return to Erinsborough for her and Aster, and they say their goodbyes. Shaun returns weeks later and comes to Elly's defence when she is hassled by a journalist. Shaun takes a job as a counsellor at Erinsborough High, and he helps Emmett Donaldson (Ezra Justin), who struggles with maths and making friends. However, Shaun is fired when he admits to leaving the school doors open, which Emmett and his friends took advantage of to vandalise a classroom. Shaun supports Elly when she is rejected by a mother's group for being a murderer, and organises their own parent's group in the garden, where he and Elly have sex. Shaun then asks her to move to Switzerland with him, which she agrees to do. Shaun departs with Elly and Aster to start a new life together in Switzerland. However, Shaun and Elly move to Sydney and amicably split two years later and divide custody of Aster.

== Others ==
Date(s)	Character	Actor	Circumstances
9 January	Lyle Kinsey	Justin Monaco	Aaron Brennan returns to his gym and thanks Lyle for covering for him. Lyle later supports Rory Zemiro through a workout. When Rory asks him about Aaron's partner, Lyle tells him that he has only just started working there.
11 January	Petra Jabour	Frances McCarthy	Petra is a wellness blogger and influencer, who is invited to review The Flame Tree Retreat by Amy Williams. Petra is unimpressed with the restaurant and dismisses the food, saying it tastes like dirt. Amy points out that Petra does not understand that they are trying to create a positive space and tells her they do not want her money. Petra posts a video of Amy's rant online, but Amy receives positive attention from those commenting on the post.
12 January	Sebastian Haeusler	Adam Rowland	While at the Back Lane Bar, Sebastian notices Dipi Rebecchi dancing and later approaches her at the bar to introduce himself. He attempts to flirt with Dipi, but she soon tells him she is married. Sebastian replies that her husband is a lucky man, wishes her a good night and moves away.
17 January	Levi Jansen	Sam Allen	Levi is a restaurateur, who leaves his business card with Amy Williams at The Flame Tree Retreat. Shane Rebecchi gets in contact with Levi, and arranges a meeting to show Levi his urine powered generator. Gary Canning enters Levi's hotel room, believing that his daughter is in there, scaring him. Levi leaves the hotel and cancels his meeting with Shane.
19 January	Kurt Pilgrim	Rob Flanagan	Kurt is a property developer, who has a business meeting with Paul Robinson and Leo Tanaka on a boat. As he goes to leave, he and Leo come across Sonya and Toadfish Rebecchi kissing in the hallway.
22 January	Crystal Carmichael	Tanya Braunovic	Aaron Brennan auditions for Crystal on behalf of dance troupe Rough Trade. Crystal tells Rory Zemiro that she is impressed and wants Aaron involved in the gig. Rory accepts on Aaron's behalf.
25 January–19 March	Gus Martinez	Blake Draper	Gus is Tia Martinez's older brother, who buys several bottles of stolen alcohol from Jimmy Williams. Gus asks Jimmy for more and threatens to tell on him if he stops providing the bottles. Gus is displeased when he has to share his work experience at the Whitten Oval with Yashvi Rebecchi. AFL Women's player Ellie Blackburn puts them through several drills and is impressed with Yashvi, before telling Gus that he did well too.
25 January	John Bushell	David Robson	John complains to Lassiters receptionist Brandon Danker that he has been charged for alcohol he did not drink, as he has a liver condition. Leo Tanaka intervenes and tells John that his bill will be amended.
29 January	Kerry Lee	Bronwyn Lamb	Kerry notices Tyler Brennan in the Lassiters Complex and moves her grandchildren on to avoid being near him, as she is aware of his murder charge.
31 January–26 February	Adrian Snyder	Michael Vice	Adrian visits Fitzgerald Motors to get an oil leak fixed. When he returns to collect his car, Adrian asks Tyler Brennan if he knows a Phillip Banks. Adrian then explains that Phillip is inside the same prison Tyler is expected to be sent to, and he will offer Tyler protection if he gets proof that Phillip's wife is being unfaithful. Tyler initially tells Adrian that he will not do it, but accepts when Adrian threatens to harm his girlfriend Piper Willis. Days later, Adrian come back to the garage to see Tyler, but Ben Kirk tells him he has the day off. Adrian later has Piper's cat poisoned. Adrian asks Tyler to alter a van so Banks can escape prison. However, he finds Tyler has not carried out the work. Adrian tips broken glass into the Brennan's swimming pool, leading to Ben Kirk cutting his foot. Tyler's brothers Aaron and Mark Brennan meet with Adrian to make a deal to keep Tyler safe from Banks. Adrian asks them to carry out the work on the van.
1 February	Verity Banks	Simone Annan	Verity is approached by Tyler Brennan at The Waterhole and she accepts a drink from him. She invites him up to her hotel room, where she catches him going through her things. Verity tells him that she knows her husband, Phillip, sent him, and that his brother Mark Brennan was the police officer who put him inside. She also explains that her husband is looking to divorce her and leave her with nothing, but she is not going to let that happen. Tyler offers to help Verity if she can help him, but she apologises as there is nothing she can do.
7 February	Kurt Pilgrim	Rob Flanagan	Kurt visits Amy Williams to talk about the Robinson Heights housing development. Amy tells Kurt that his budget is grossly overestimated and she knows there are other contractors who could do the work for less. She asks him to reconfigure his quote, but Kurt refuses and then tells Amy that he will speak with her father, so she fires him from the project. Kurt attempts to talk to Paul Robinson about his dismissal, but Paul supports Amy's decision.
9 February	Sarah Whelan	Kylie Ryan	Sarah is a vet who treats Clementine after she is poisoned. She tells Xanthe Canning and Ben Kirk that she has pumped Clementine's stomach and she will be okay, before presenting them with a bill for $900.
13 February	Detective Hall Tucker	Damon Hunter	Detective Tucker helps Tyler Brennan rescue Piper Willis from falling off the edge of a building, before arresting them both. Tucker later informs Piper that the charges against her have been dropped.
13 February	Constable Marko North	Craig Johnson	Constable North escorts Tyler Brennan into the court room and removes him when he receives a jail sentence.
13 February 2018, 18 April 2019, 20 April 2020	Tipstaff Freddy Poljack	Nick Buckland	The tipstaff assists Judge Roz Challis and asks everyone in the court to stand when she is entering and exiting the court room during Tyler Brennan's trial. He is present also during Finn Kelly's sentencing hearing, and calls the various witnesses to the stand to give their statements. He is later present during Elly Conway's sentencing hearing.
22 February	Lisa Connolly	Tasha Sanders	Lisa is a building safety inspector, who visits the Robinson Heights housing development. She instantly notices Jayden Warley is not wearing a hard hat and later sees a truck with an unsecure load. She asks site manager Amy Williams to stop all construction until she has finished her inspection. Lisa issues Amy and Paul Robinson with a provisional improvement notice.
6–29 March	Cameron McGilp	Jharaiz Kiriona	Upon returning to the hospital, Izzy Hoyland approaches Cameron and tells him that she left her purse in the hospital's research lab. Cameron tells her that only staff can access the lab, so Izzy attempts to flirt with him, before threatening to report him to Clive Gibbons. A couple of weeks later, Cameron catches Holly Hoyland trying to return confidential files that she took.
8 March	TJ Gantry	Sami Obama	TJ tries to get a glass of wine at The Waterhole, but Shane Rebecchi keeps boring him with a story and stopping himself from pouring the wine.
15 March–12 June	Rita Newland	Lisa Kay	Rita visits Toadfish Rebecchi at his home to discuss Izzy Hoyland. She is the daughter of Izzy's late husband, Clint, and wishes to contest the validity of her father's will. Rita visits Toadie the following day and tells him to get everything signed before she leaves. Rita's deal asks that Izzy give up all claims to the estate, and Rita will forget about the money that has already spent. Rita later looks over the paperwork Toadie has drafted up, as Izzy plans to settle, but she turns down Toadie's plea to honour the $20 million hospital donation. Rita is impressed with Toadie's legal skills and offers him the chance to do more work for her, which he accepts after she agrees he can continue to work independently. However, when she gets hit in the face by a cake thrown by Toadie's brother Shane Rebecchi, she retracts Toadie's job offer. When she later returns to Erinsborough, Rita conspires to replace Clive Gibbons with Karl Kennedy as COO of Erinsborough Hospital. She asks Karl if he wants to help her company expand into multiple sclerosis treatment that Karl's wife, Susan, can benefit from. They accept the offer and Rita convinces Karl to run for the hospital board in order to introduce MS treatment trials to the hospital. When Rita is later in a meeting with Karl, he experiences chest pains and Rita rushes him to hospital. Rita then hires Finn Kelly, who pretends he has MS, to work as an intern in the trial. However, when Finn sabotages Karl's work and the trial is suspended, Rita cuts ties with the hospital.
16 March–10 May	Poppy Ryan	Eloise Ross	Poppy is one of Tia Martinez's friends, Jimmy Williams stops Poppy to talk, but he struggles as he has a crush on her. Days later, Kirsha Rebecchi meets Poppy in Harold's Cafe and tries to get to know her interests on Jimmy's behalf. She does not overhear Poppy insulting her. Jimmy asks Poppy out on a date to play mini-golf and she accepts. Jimmy's mother Amy Williams later interrupts Jimmy and Poppy kissing after a study session. Poppy tells Kirsha that she does not always have to hang out with them, as she is a third wheel. Amy brings Jimmy and Poppy over to Kirsha's house for a swim, and Poppy makes a comment to Kirsha about the time she got her period at school. At the school camp, Poppy continues to bully Kirsha, who alerts Jimmy. Yashvi Rebecchi comes to her sister's defence, and Poppy is sent home from the camp. Before she leaves, Jimmy breaks up with her.
19 March	Ellie Blackburn	Herself	Ellie puts Gus Martinez and Yashvi Rebecchi through drills, as part of their work experience. Ellie is impressed with Yashvi and suggests that she finds herself a team to play for, to help her technique.
22 March	Fraser Kurzil	Josh Geary	Fraser is interviewed by Mark Brennan and Elly Conway for a job at Fitzgerald Motors. Fraser admits that he has not started his TAFE course and Elly realises that he has lied on his CV, so he leaves.
27 March	Hayden Strom	Jack Stratton-Smith	Hayden is an Uber driver, who drops Chloe Brennan off at Lassiters, where she thanks him with a kiss.
29 March	Ross Wilson	Himself	Ross performs at The Waterhole for Sheila Canning, as a favour for Clive Gibbons. When Ross invites Sheila on stage, but she forgets the words to the song and leaves.
3 April	Vic Burton	Nick Mitchell	Vic takes photos of Number 32 Ramsay Street and tells Dipi Rebecchi that he is a real estate agent, who is following up on a request.
9 April 2018, 31 May 2019	Elaine Louder	Marie-Claire Anastasia	A Lassiters day spa assistant. Chloe Brennan asks her to change David Tanaka's booked massage to a couple's package. When Elaine shows David to the room, he finds Mark Brennan waiting for him. Elaine assumes Mark is not out when he insists that he should not be there, before revealing Chloe changed the booking. The following year, Elaine gives David, Aaron Brennan, Ned Willis and Bea Nilsson a letter from Finn Kelly explaining why they are at the spa. She asks which couple wants to start with the sauna and David and Bea follow her.
12 April–8 May	Jake Hendra	Guy Greenstone	Jake overhears Dipi Rebecchi calling his daughter a cheat for bumping Yashvi Rebecchi and tells her to pull her head in, as it was a fair move. When Jake yells at Yashvi to miss a goal kick, Dipi tells him to shut up and punches him. She soon apologises. When Jake comes to Harold's Cafe, Dipi agrees to serve him, but asks for an apology to Yashvi first. Jake tells her to get over it and Dipi asks him to leave, as he is banned from the café for life. Jake retaliates with an online post urging people to boycott the café, which affects Dipi's business. Dipi later apologises to Jake and rescinds the ban.
13 April	Jaida Patrick	Dana Miltins	Jaida is a football recruiter who attended Yashvi Rebecchi's last game. Shane Rebecchi brings Jaida to Harold's Cafe to meet Yashvi. Jaida tells her that she is still pretty raw, but if she keeps playing well, then she may be considered for next year's draft.
16 April	Lockie Harding	Alexander Arco	Piper Willis notices Lockie dropping off a book at the book exchange and believes he is the person who is underlining various passages in the books. She follows him to the local gym and learns he works at the Back Lane Bar. She introduces herself to Lockie, who does not confirm that he is the underliner, and he invites her to stay for a drink so they can talk about books. Lockie eventually admits that he was dropping the book off for his mother and refuses to believe that Piper does not want to have sex with him. He locks the door to the bar and attempts to force himself on Piper, who knees him in the groin and escapes the bar. She later reports him to the police.
17 April	Martin Popovich	Michael Rusic	Martin tells Terese Willis, Xanthe Canning and Elly Conway that he is just the cleaner when they burst into the Back Lane Bar looking for Piper Willis.
18–27 April, 28 September	Monique Hughes	Madeleine Vizard	Monique is Mishti Sharma's best friend. Her partner Leo Tanaka invites Monique to Erinsborough to visit Mishti. Monique later overhears Chloe Brennan talking about serving alcohol to an underage Xanthe Canning, and Monique tells Leo that she will keep it from Mishti if he gives her $1000. Leo refuses to pay up and he threatens to tell Mishti about the blackmail. Monique later calls a truce. Mishti introduces Monique to former police constable Mark Brennan. Mark tells Monique that he tampered with evidence and leads her to think he is corrupt himself. He then mentions that Sheila Canning is willing to pay protection money and Monique attempts to extort money from Sheila. She soon learns that she has been set up when Sheila goes to the police and Monique quickly leaves town. Mishti later contacts Monique and tells her about Dilhan Ozdil and the sex tape he created. Monique has Dilhan beaten up. She then meets with Mishti, and tells her that her former fiancé Zander was not corrupt, he just helped Monique out of a bad situation. Mishti then arrests Monique.
11 May	Brett Davis	Ed Rickards	After Kirsha Rebecchi and Susan Kennedy go missing in the bush, SES volunteer Brett leads the search for them. Brett is hesitant to let Kirsha's father Shane Rebecchi join in the search effort, as there is only 30 minutes of light left. In the morning, Amy Williams announces she is leading a group to start a search, and Brett tells her that no one should leave without coordinating with the SES first, but Elly tells him he cannot stop Amy. Brett is soon concerned to learn that Karl Kennedy is out in the bush, while being treated for DVT with blood thinners.
18 May–9 August	Marisa Taylor	Shannon Barker	Marisa plays for Eden Hills Dolphins AFLW team, along with Yashvi Rebecchi. She accuses Yashvi of receiving special treatment after overhearing Piper Willis asking to interview her. Following the game, Marisa tells Yashvi that she gets an easy ride from the umpires because of her skin colour. Marisa continues to racially abuse Yashvi, who eventually tells her mother. During a meeting with Yashvi, Dipi Rebecchi, their coach and her mother, Marisa refuses to apologise and says the comments were just sledging. Coach Romy removes her from the team. Yashvi's father Shane Rebecchi later refuses to let Marisa use the bathroom at The Waterhole, despite Marisa working at Lassiters Hotel. Marisa tells him there are a lot of people who think like her. Marisa helps Chloe Brennan decorate the pub, and reluctantly agrees to put up posters featuring the Rebecchi family. The posters are defaced and Marisa is seen tearing one of them down, leading Chloe to fire her. Yashvi's younger sister Kirsha Rebecchi later admits that she defaced the posters and Marisa blackmails her. When Shane finds out about the blackmail, he confronts Marisa and calls her a bigot. She films Shane and uploads the footage to the internet. Marisa is offered her job back at Lassiters, which she accepts. But after Yashvi tells her some home truths, Marisa resigns.
31 May	Lesley Taylor	Lisa Aldenhoven	Lesley, her daughter Marisa, and Coach Romy meet with Yashvi Rebecchi and her mother Dipi to discuss the racist comments Marisa has been making towards Yashvi. Coach Romy tells Marisa that the messages are racial vilification and that they are unacceptable. Marisa refuses to apologise, saying the comments were just sledging, so Coach Romy removes her from the team.
31 May	Coach Romy Britton	Jessica Hackett	Lesley, her daughter Marisa, and Coach Romy meet with Yashvi Rebecchi and her mother Dipi to discuss the racist comments Marisa has been making towards Yashvi. Coach Romy tells Marisa that the messages are racial vilification and that they are unacceptable. Marisa refuses to apologise, saying the comments were just sledging, so Coach Romy removes her from the team.
6–20 June, 27 September	Dilhan Ozdil	Kyle Hazebroek	Dilhan notices Mishti Sharma at The Waterhole bar, and she brings him home for a one-night stand. Xanthe Canning later catches Dilhan taking money from Mishti's purse. Xanthe screams and Dilhan flees the house. He later sends Mishti a text message asking her to call off the police or he will upload footage of them having sex to the internet. Aaron Brennan arranges to meet Dilhan and pretends that he shares his interests. He gets Dilhan to show him his laptop, before Mishti arrests Dilhan. Aaron deletes the footage of Mishti, but she later learns that it has been posted online. Dilhan's bail is posted by his father, and he later sends Mishti threatening text messages. Leo Tanaka finds Dilhan playing pool at The Waterhole and attempts to goad him into a fight, but Dilhan realises that his bail will be revoked if he fights Leo. As they argue, Leo throws a punch and hits Ned Willis, giving Dilhan the chance to walk away. Months later, Dilhan is brought in to Erinsborough Hospital, having been attacked by someone hired by Monique Hughes. He apologises to Mishti as he goes into surgery.
8 June	George Vellekoop	Andrew Burns	George is a client of Toadie Rebecchi. When George has doubts about keeping Toadie on as his lawyer, Toadie's PA, Sheila Canning, convinces him not to fire Toadie.
14 June	Travis Webb	Jack Martin	Travis goes on a blind date with Mishti Sharma. He tells her about his time volunteering at a wildlife sanctuary in Borneo, while she admits that she is very work-orientated. Travis encourages Mishti to dance with him.
15 June	Dean Duffy	Cezar Adams	As he is being taken to the Erinsborough police station, Dean notices Mishti Sharma and wolf whistles at her, before calling her gorgeous.
2 July, 13 July	Javier Gaetano	Bernard Angel	Javier works at the hospital. He remarks to his colleague Patrick that it seems he does not have a life outside of work. Patrick tells him that he has a partner, who reminds him of a former girlfriend who caused him trouble. Karl Kennedy and Mark Brennan later question Javier about Patrick, and he tells them about the conversation they had.
10 July 2018, 7 September 2018, 24 March 2020, 2 September 2020	Patricia Hillman	BillieRose Cachia	A paramedic, who brings Xanthe Canning to Erinsborough Hospital following a hit-and-run. She tells David Tanaka that Xanthe has a broken sternum and is not responding to any vocal commands. Weeks later, Patricia is called to Lassiters Hotel, after Ned Willis falls asleep in a sauna and develops hypothermia. She tells Amy Williams and Yashvi Rebecchi that he will be kept at the hospital overnight. She also reassures Yashvi that a few minutes more and the situation could have been much worse. Two years later, Patricia brings in Bea Nilsson and tells Karl Kennedy about her injuries, including a leg fracture. Patricia later admits a young female patient who has been involved in a car collision, and has to get David's attention when he struggles to focus.
17 July	Dr Wes Madden	Brian Lipson	Dr Madden is treating Andrea Somers at a psychiatric hospital in Tasmania. Sonya Rebecchi tells him that Andrea gave birth to a son six months ago, which leads Dr Madden to speculate that she is suffering from postnatal psychosis.
23 July	Sara Dennet	Emma Choy	Sara is a nurse at Grovesdale Hospital in Hobart. She tells Willow Somers, Sonya Rebecchi and Toadfish Rebecchi that they can visit Andrea Somers, but only one in at a time.
23 July, 30 August	Annabel Rutherford	Sophia Davey	Annabel is a well known photographer who agrees to shoot Aaron Brennan and David Tanaka's wedding, but only if she can photograph a recreation of their proposal first. Aaron poses with Ned Willis, but Annabel tells them that she is not seeing the love between them. Aaron admits that David could not make the shoot, but Annabel says she just wants her promo shot and Ned puts in more effort. The following month, Annabel is hired to photograph the Rebecchi family. After they turn up late, the children struggle to stay still and Annabel fails to get any good shots.
24 July	Ian Palmer	Bruce Carboon	Ian is an exam supervisor who watches Xanthe Canning take the UMAT at Erinsborough Hospital. When Xanthe drops her pencil due to a spasm, Ian has to tell her father and grandmother to leave when they rush in. Xanthe suffers a seizure and Ian leaves to fetch a doctor.
25 July–14 November	Jeremy Sluggett	Tamblyn Lord	Gary Canning meets with Jeremy to ask him for his former cellmate Finn Kelly's whereabouts. Jeremy says he has an address, but he will only give it to Gary if he holds onto some money for him. When Jeremy goes to collect the money from The Flametree Retreat, he is interrupted by Sindi Watts, who calls the police. She attempts to stop him from leaving, but he pushes her to the ground and makes his exit. He is later arrested by the police and sent back to prison. Following his release, Jeremy is approached by Paul Robinson with a plan to set Gary up. Jeremy tells Gary about a job he has for him, but Gary turns it down and reveals he knows that he is working with Paul. Lord previously guested on the serial as Barry Salter 30 years earlier.
27 July	Tean Murray	Siobhan Connors	Tean rejoins Leo Tanaka at a table in The Waterhole, and remarks that the bathrooms there are better than those at the Erinsborough Backpackers, where they met. They then leave together.
7 August	Louise Zimmerman	Jasmine Anders	Dr Zimmerman replaces Rob Carson when Amy Williams comes to the hospital for a mole check and a HPV test. She tells Amy that Dr Carson was called into a meeting.
13 August	Danielle Southgate	Annie Lumsden	Danielle joins Amy Williams and Chloe Brennan at Erinsborough Backpackers for drinks and games. After Amy leaves, Chloe and Danielle steal the Ramsay Street sign. When a police car pulls up to the Backpackers, Danielle runs off, leaving Chloe to deal with the police.
16 August	James McTavish	Jordan Holtman	James is one of the trainers at The Shed gym. Aaron Brennan tells James that he has to let him go, as the gym is losing money and he was the last trainer hired.
17 August	Lenny Hicks	Reg Watson	Lenny is a guest at Lassiters Hotel, who comes to see the new games room. He persuades Chloe Brennan to let him and his friends gamble for money.
22 August	Orion Ibraheim	Simon Barbaro	Orion asks Chloe Brennan out on a date, after meeting her in the games room at Lassiters Hotel. They have dinner and Orion reveals that he is a widower with two children. Orion gives Chloe an envelope of money for a taxi, and she finds $300 inside.
27 August	Harrison Keller	Chris Hanrahan	Harrison meets with Chloe Brennan at The Waterhole for a lunch date, following a recommendation from Orion Ibraheim. Harrison tells Chloe that he is married with children, and that he just wants someone to have an open and honest conversation with. Chloe's brother Mark Brennan interrupts and tells Harrison to leave or he will contact his wife.
30 August–18 October	Pavan Nahal	Akkshey Caplash	Pavan meets with Mishti Sharma after contacting her through an arranged marriage website. He flies to Melbourne for their first date which goes well. Mishti later invites him to Erinsborough to have lunch with her family, and her sister Dipi Rebecchi arranges for her drama group to host an improv event. Pavan impresses everyone with a rap about arranged marriage, and he later proposes to Mishti, who accepts. Mishti asks Pavan to take a marriage compatibility test. Pavan tells Mishti that he once got into debt, while Mishti reveals that she wanted to shoot the man who killed her former fiancé. Mishti meets Pavan's mother, Menna Nahal, who later comes down to meet Mishti's family. Mishti informs them that she has been suspended from the force. Pavan learns that Mishti was in a sex tape and ends their engagement. Days later, Dipi comes to see Pavan while he is in Erinsborough to talk about Mishti. He explains that he ended the engagement because Mishti lied to him. Dipi points out that Mishti was a victim of a crime, which is why she did not tell him about the video. Pavan apologises to Mishti and tells her that he still wants to marry her. Pavan accepts a job offer in Sydney and Mishti agrees to move to the city to be with him.
25 September–2 October	Thomas Hewes-Belton	Greg Parker	Gary Canning brings bank manager Thomas to the Lassiters Complex for lunch. Thomas informs Gary that the loan he has been approved for will not be in his account for two weeks. A week later, Gary asks Thomas if the loan can be paid into his account a day early, but Thomas tells him that he cannot approve the loan as he knows Gary cannot keep up with the repayments following his demotion.
28 September	Caroline Alexander	Melanie Beddie	Caroline hires Chloe Brennan through her Cash4Company business to have sex with her son, Sandy for his birthday. Chloe plans to outsource her services, but her friend cancels at the last minute. Chloe approaches Sandy at The Waterhole and asks him to have a drink with her. As they are talking, Chloe notices some girls at the pool table looking at Sandy and she encourages him to speak to them. Chloe introduces herself and Sandy to the girls. Greta initially assumes Sandy is Chloe's boyfriend, but Chloe assures her that they are not together. She then mentions that Sandy does taekwondo and Greta tells him she does it too. Caroline is pleased when Chloe tells her Sandy and Greta are going to continue seeing each other, and she gives Chloe a bonus.
28 September	Sandy Alexander	Charles Russell	
28 September	Greta Van Pelt	Peggy Ford	
1 October	Menna Nahal	Mala Singh-Narayan	Menna is Pavan Nahal's mother, who comes to Erinsborough to meet his fiancée Mishti Sharma. Menna is not impressed when Mishti admits that she has been suspended from the police force for disobeying orders. After Mishti's sister Dipi Rebecchi shows her around the house, Menna tells Pavan they have to leave.
4 October	Bohdi Crawford	Grady Lynch	Bohdi is approached by Elissa Gallow while he is collecting the mail, and she asks for his help in retrieveing a letter that she claims she mistakenly posted.
9 October–23 November	Det. Pete Shaw	Christopher Stollery	Detective Shaw asks Mishti Sharma whether Cassius Grady's confession letter is at the station, but she informs him that Cassius's mother Elissa Gallow intercepted it. After Elissa is apprehended, Shaw tells Cassius that Elissa will be charged as an accessory. Cassius refuses to give a statement about his involvement in Hamish Roche's murder, until Shaw releases Elissa. Piper Willis visits Cassius and gets him to change his mind. Shaw asks Cassius why he came back to Erinsborough and he explains that he needed to find his medallion. Instead of fleeing, he stayed because he fell in love with Piper. Weeks later, Shaw interviews Susan Kennedy after she confesses to pushing Finn Kelly from a cliff. He also interviews Bea Nilsson, Elly Conway and Xanthe Canning about that day. When Susan later admits that she wanted Finn dead, Shaw arrests her for attempted murder.
13–15 November	Dr Carla Taylor	Devon Lang Wilton	Dr Taylor is Andrea Somers' doctor at Grovesdale Hospital. She bumps into Alice Wells as she comes out of Andrea's room and, assuming Alice is a volunteer, asks her how Andrea seems. Days later, Dr Taylor meets with Toadfish Rebecchi to tell him that Andrea's growing sense of identity is a good sign her treatment is working. She tells him that Andrea has been asking questions about her family and advises him to visit her.
14 November	Mike Lalor	Mitchell Pope	Mike is a barman at The Waterhole, who Alice Wells orders a cocktail from. Karl Kennedy greets Mike and orders his usual. Karl tells Mike about his trip to Boston, but Mike is not very interested and Alice introduces herself to Karl.
7 December	Brian Pitts	Aaron James Campbell	Brian and his friends are drinking in the Botanical Gardens, when he notices Sonya Rebecchi coming towards them, so he offers her a drink from a bottle of bourbon.
10 December	Alex Bruce	Sinui Pavino	Nurse Alex helps Sonya Rebecchi as she drags herself into Erinsborough Hospital, and assures her that she will be okay. He later attempts to change Sonya's saline drip, but she resists as she thinks he is giving her painkillers.
11 December	Brit Edwards	Jodi Haigh	Brit drops off a van containing some stolen goods for Gary Canning to deliver.
17 December	Catherine Miragliotta	Holly Hargreaves	Gary Canning meets with Catherine at a warehouse to collect and move more stolen goods.
18 December	Blake Grimwood	Lochie Graham	A student at Erinsborough High. Blake hands Kirsha Rebecchi a note to pass along, but she is caught by acting principal Jane Harris, who gives them extra homework. Blake then tells Kirsha that he has a present for Jane from his mother, but he does not want to give it to her himself, so Kirsha does it. Blake watches on as Jane unwraps a box of aphrodisiac tea. Jane later tells him off for laughing when he notices her drinking the tea.
18 December 2018, 8 January 2019	Joseph Bullen	Will Ward-Ambler	Joseph remarks that Gary Canning is late with the delivery of stolen solar inverters, and Gary tells him that he got a flat tyre. Joseph notices that one of the boxes is opened and Gary replies that the inverter slipped out, but he put it back in. Joseph pays him and points out where to put the boxes. Joseph comes to Ramsay Street to ask Gary about the inverters that were placed in the Pavilion Coffee Hut. Gary tells him that they are gone, before Amy Williams asks him to leave because she is Paul Robinson's daughter and he knows people far worse than Joseph.
20 December	Mitch Neebles	Jack Doherty	Mitch meets Chloe Brennan at the Back Lane Bar, where he is celebrating with his water polo team. Mitch and Chloe talk and flirt most of the night, before they leave the bar together.
