= Shane Rebecchi =

Fictional character from Neighbours

- Neighbours character
- Portrayed by: Greg O'Meara (1994–1995); Nicholas Coghlan (2017–2021)
- Duration: 1994–1995, 2017–2021
- First appearance: 8 September 1994
- Last appearance: 30 March 2021
- Introduced by: Stanley Walsh (1994); Bill Searle (1995); Jason Herbison (2017)
In-universe information
- Other names: Pufferfish
- Occupation: Inventor; Bartender; University student
- Father: Kevin Rebecchi
- Mother: Angie Rebecchi
- Brothers: Stonefish Rebecchi; Toadie Rebecchi
- Wife: Dipi Sharma (2000–present)
- Sons: Jay Rebecchi
- Daughters: Yashvi Rebecchi; Kirsha Rebecchi
- Nephews: Callum Rebecchi; Hugo Somers
- Nieces: Nell Rebecchi
- First cousins: Dylan Timmins

Shane Rebecchi is a fictional character from the Australian television soap opera Neighbours. He was originally played by Greg O'Meara from his first appearance on 8 September 1994. Shane was introduced along with his parents and two younger brothers. His first stint in the show ends with him going to prison after committing a string of robberies, before escaping and trying to convince his brother Stonefish Rebecchi (Anthony Engelman) to hide him. Shane's exit scenes aired on 25 July 1995. The character was reintroduced 22 years later on 17 April 2017, with actor Nicholas Coghlan cast in the role. He was introduced along with his wife Dipi Rebecchi (Sharon Johal) and daughters Yashvi Rebecchi (Olivia Junkeer) and Kirsha Rebecchi (Vani Dhir), as part of a big expansion of the Rebecchi family. Executive producer Jason Herbison called Shane "one of the great untapped characters from Neighbours history".

Shane's fictional backstory details his rehabilitation from prison and subsequent move to Bourke, where he raised his family. Coghlan used his own personal experiences as "a bad boy" to help him with the role and he believed Shane had matured since his first stint. Shane is also portrayed as being calmer, fun loving and protective. He returns to Erinsborough to support his brother Toadfish Rebecchi (Ryan Moloney) through his marital issues, and is accompanied by his sister-in-law Mishti Sharma (Scarlet Vas), with whom he has a close friendship. The new Rebecchis were given immediate links with the show's characters, as Shane rents Number 32 Ramsay Street and takes over the lease of Harold's Café. Writers scripted a feud between Shane and neighbour Gary Canning (Damien Richardson), which begins when Gary loses Shane a potential investor. Gary later attacks Dipi, before befriending her, leading to jealousy from Shane.

Writers later established a friendship between Shane and his younger co-worker Roxy Willis (Zima Anderson), after she confides in him about being a donor match for David Tanaka (Takaya Honda). Anderson thought the friendship was unexpected and called it "an odd match", but said that Shane allows Roxy to be herself. The friendship is soon tested when Roxy kisses Shane and then tells Dipi. Johal said her character feels betrayed by Shane and that the kiss caused a breach of trust within Shane and Dipi's marriage. In 2020, the character was used to portray the problems of drug addiction. Shane takes amphetamines to help him keep up with his university coursework and cope with everyday life, as he suffers from low self-esteem. Coghlan was glad of the chance to take on a larger, more serious storyline. Roxy also becomes involved and Coghlan said Shane abuses their friendship, calling his actions towards her brutal and cruel. Coghlan's departure from the show was announced in March 2021, alongside Johal's.

== Development ==
=== Early history ===
Shane was originally played by Greg O'Meara. He was introduced as a member of the newly created Rebecchi family, which consisted of his younger brothers Stonefish Rebecchi (Anthony Engelman), Toadfish Rebecchi (Ryan Moloney), and their parents Angie Rebecchi (Lesley Baker) and Kevin "Big Kev" Rebecchi (Don Bridges). The character's first stint ends with him going to prison for a series of robberies, before he escapes and returns to Erinsborough, where he asks Stonie to hide him at Number 32. Despite Shane's pressure, Stonie is reluctant to abuse his housemates' trust. Shane eventually returns to prison, after turning himself in at Stonie's request, as it was "the right thing to do."

=== Reintroduction ===
"He's no longer the loose cannon he once was – Shane believes in family above all else, and would do anything for his loved ones."

— Coghlan on how the character has changed in 22 years.

On 27 March 2017, Daniel Kilkelly of Digital Spy reported that Shane was being reintroduced to Neighbours after 22 years, with actor Nicholas Coghlan cast in the role. Coghlan told a writer for Woman's Day that he was honoured to join the Neighbours cast and become a member of the Rebecchi family. He later explained that as he grew up in the same area where the show is filmed, he felt that securing the role was "a sort of homecoming" for him. He also admitted to surprising himself with how much he knew about his character's family history. Coghlan filmed his first scenes at Pin Oak Court, the outdoor location for Ramsay Street, where Shane meets up with Toadie and his young daughter Nell Rebecchi (Scarlett Anderson). Coghlan said he "hit the ground running, it was really fast and furious." Coghlan made his debut as Shane during the episode broadcast on 17 April 2017.

Shane's wife Dipi Rebecchi (Sharon Johal) and daughters Yashvi Rebecchi (Olivia Junkeer) and Kirsha Rebecchi (Vani Dhir) were also introduced alongside him, as part of "a major expansion" of the Rebecchi family. Of bringing back Shane, the show's executive producer Jason Herbison stated "Shane Rebecchi is one of the great untapped characters from Neighbours history. I'm delighted to welcome him back to Ramsay Street along with his beautiful wife, two children and sister-in-law, it's a great new chapter of the Rebecchi family." The new Rebecchis are an Indian-Australian family. Herbison said that he and the other produces felt it was important that the family "reflect the cultural diversity of the community and our audience." The commissioning editor for the show's UK broadcaster Channel 5, Greg Barnett added that "It's great to be expanding the Rebecchi family further. There'll be drama and intrigue from the moment they arrive."

==== Characterisation ====
The character was given a backstory explaining his time away from Erinsborough. It states that after Shane was rehabilitated and released from prison, he decided to move to Bourke, as he was too ashamed and proud to ask his family for support. While selling farming machinery, Shane met and married waitress Dipi, and they had three children together. Shane is an inventor and he enjoys working on his latest projects in his shed. He is also passionate about bush poetry, which he likes to perform after having a few drinks. Coghlan explained that Shane has worked hard to turn his life around, and he now wants to be a good brother to Toadie. Coghlan used his own personal experiences as "a bad boy" to help him with the role, commenting "I always seem to get myself into silly situations, thankfully never to the degree that Shane has been caught up in!"

Coghlan thought Shane had grown up and matured since his early days on the show, and said he was calmer and no longer desperate. Coghlan also called his character "pretty fun loving", and protective of his family, who he puts "at the heart of everything he does". Coghlan added "There's something in Shane that worries that he's not good enough as his brother Toadie is a successful lawyer; he feels as if he hasn't reached his full potential." Like the other members of his family, Shane has a fish nickname – Pufferfish. He is often styled in flannelette shirts and a stockman hat.

In July 2020, Coghlan called for the introduction of Shane and Dipi's son Jay Rebecchi, who has often been mentioned by his on-screen family. Coghlan explained that Jay is Shane and Dipi's middle child and he is away at a Sydney boarding school. Coghlan thought Jay's introduction would be good for his character, saying "I think a bright, young, male energy would be really good in that house. Shane is dominated by the women in the family. Someone who can bring out the silliness and 'House of Trouser' in Shane and his little brother, Toadie. That would be pretty fun." He added that Jay could also bring an element of comedy to the Rebecchi family and tap into their playful nature.

==== Early storylines ====
Coghlan told Sarah Ellis of Inside Soap that Shane comes back to Erinsborough to support Toadie during his "time of need", following his marriage breakdown. He uses the opportunity to avoid some financial problems back home in Bourke. Lesley Baker reprised her role as Toadie and Shane's mother Angie, as it emerges that she sent Shane to check up on Toadie. Coghlan explained that while Shane wants to be supportive towards his brother, he makes some mistakes such as telling Toadie that he saw his estranged wife Sonya Rebecchi (Eve Morey) kissing Mark Brennan (Scott McGregor). Shane is accompanied to Erinsborough by his sister-in-law Mishti Sharma (Scarlet Vas), who helps him organise a potential move to the town. Coghlan told Ellis that Shane and Mishti have a close friendship and they share some serious confidences. Writers gave Shane and his family immediate links with the show's other characters, as Shane rents Number 32 Ramsay Street for his family and takes over the lease of local business, Harold's Café. His wife and daughters then arrive to the news that they are moving to Erinsborough. Coghlan commented that Shane wants his family to fit in.

Another early storyline for the character focused on his invention of a solar-powered lawnmower and attempts to sell it to investors, which Kilkelly noted was "trickier than planned." The plot also involves Shane's family, who ask Aaron Brennan (Matt Wilson) to help market the lawnmower. He comes up several ideas on how to make it more marketable, including naming it Rolli. During a test run at Lassiters Lake, the lawnmower is accidentally driven into the lake, which leaves Shane in "a total slump" and feeling like a failure. He tells Dipi that he wants to give up on his hobby, as he has already invested too much time and money in it.

=== Feud with Gary Canning ===
During a "downward spiral", Shane ends up fighting with neighbour Gary Canning (Damien Richardson), which starts a feud between them. Shane is "feeling useless" after sustaining a hand injury while protecting Kirsha from being hit by a bike, but he hopes a meeting with entrepreneur Levi Jansen (Sam Allen) will result in Levi investing in his latest invention. However, he is left "mystified and somewhat miffed" when Levi cancels and the resulting low self-esteem leads him to get drunk. When Shane learns that it is Gary's fault for Levi's departure, he angrily confronts him in the street. Vas said that Shane goes around "kicking bins, yelling and threatening Gary", forcing her character to arrest him and causing a rift in the family. Vas told an Inside Soap columnist "Shane is clearly in the wrong on this occasion, and if Mishti didn't do her job properly, it would be very obvious to her superiors." Vas also said that Dipi is "fuming" about the arrest and believes Mishti should have gone easy on Shane, as he is family. But Vas pointed out that Mishti's job is to protect the public and she has to be a police officer first, and a sister second.

The second instance of the characters clashing occurs after Gary accidentally attacks Dipi on New Year's Eve, leaving her hospitalised. The men have another "Ramsay Street showdown" when Shane finds Gary apologising to and bonding with Dipi in his house. Shane "unleashes his anger" at Gary and physically manhandles him outside and throws him into the street. Some viewers believed that the friendship between Dipi and Gary would lead to an affair storyline for them, but Johal dismissed the theory saying that they were not well matched. The storyline was revisited in 2019, as Shane becomes jealous over Dipi and Gary's friendship. Things between Shane and Dipi are strained by Kirsha's departure for a Sydney school and his decision to help Toadie with a lawsuit against Lassiters, which could affect Dipi's business. Dipi "seeks solace" in Gary, who is going through a break up, and they spend a lot of time together. Shane catches them when he attempts to apologise and he "begins to resent their closeness" when Dipi helps Gary out at his restaurant, The 82. Shane then decides that he will "cause some chaos" in their friendship.

=== Friendship with Roxy Willis ===
Writers formed a friendship between Shane and his co-worker Roxy Willis (Zima Anderson), after she confides in him about being a match for David Tanaka (Takaya Honda), who needs a kidney donor. Shane advises Roxy that she needs to make a quick decision about whether to become a donor or not, as David does not have much time. Anderson, when asked if Roxy could lead Shane astray, Anderson told Inside Soap's Alice Penwill that Roxy's excitement often leads her to do "some crazy things", so there was a chance that she and Shane would "get up to mischief" as he has fun with her. She felt that she and Coghlan shared a similar bond to their characters and said that he was easy to work with and always there for her. Anderson later said that Roxy and Shane were "an odd match", but he allows her to be herself and he feels comfortable enough to be himself around her.

The close friendship between the pair leads Roxy to kiss Shane, affecting his marriage. The development comes after Roxy and Shane's boss Sheila Canning (Colette Mann) attempts to keep them apart at work, having noticed their bond. However, her plans fails when the pair are left to work alone one night, which leads to Roxy kissing Shane. Shane is taken by surprise and he pulls away, before leaving. He later tells Roxy that he wants to confess everything to Dipi, but Roxy asks Shane to keep it to himself, as she does not want to be known as a "homewrecker". Anderson thought that Roxy was a little hurt by Shane wanting to tell Dipi. She continued "The last thing she wants is to upset anyone. As long as Shane's happy, though, that's all that Roxy cares about." Dipi learns of the kiss from Roxy and moves in with the Cannings, leaving Shane wondering if he will be able to win back his wife. Johal said that the kiss had caused "a breach of trust" in Shane and Dipi's marriage, and pointed out that Shane has history of not telling Dipi things up front. She continued "Dipi feels betrayed by the person she loves most in the world. By Shane not telling her about it himself, she was put in a situation where she ended up being humiliated publicly."

As scenes showing Gary supporting Dipi aired, Alice Penwill of Inside Soap speculated that Shane might have something to worry about. But Johal told her that despite the grief Shane gave her over their friendship, Dipi truly sees Gary as a platonic friend; he just understands how she is feeling. Johal also said that Shane and Dipi's marriage is not "dire", but Dipi is concerned about their difficulties in communicating. She called them "an incredibly strong couple" who had lost their way. The characters' marriage comes under further strain when Dipi kisses Gary. She is "mortified" by her actions and vows to tell Shane straight away, but their neighbour Karl Kennedy (Alan Fletcher), having witnessed the kiss, gets there first.

=== Drug addiction ===
"This is probably the biggest peak for Shane in the whole time that he's been on Ramsay Street. It's definitely the most serious storyline he's had to go through. It feels pretty good to have some meaty material to work with."

— Coghlan talking to Digital Spy's Daniel Kilkelly about Shane's first major storyline.

Producers used the character to portray the social issue of drug addiction, as part of a larger storyline surrounding drug dealing in Erinsborough. Georgie Stone, who portrays Mackenzie Hargreaves, teased the storyline in a July 2020 interview, saying "Shane is starting to go through a very difficult time because of uni and he is so stressed and taking it out on the people around him – and because Mackenzie is at home recovering, she seems to be in the frontline of his outbursts." Shane's behaviour is the result of buying and taking "illicit pills" to help him keep up with his university coursework. He panics when Yashvi, who is a new police constable, conducts a search at the local high school, following reports of dealing. Coghlan told Sarah Ellis of Inside Soap that hearing Yashvi has been working on the drug dealing case gives Shane "the frights" and it is a small wake up call to what he has been doing. Coghlan pointed out that like most addicts, he feels that he has his drug taking under control. Shane struggles to hide his drug use from Dipi, but she starts to notice that he has not been acting like himself.

Coghlan was excited to receive the storyline, telling Radio Times' Johnathon Hughes that it was "something big and meaty to get my teeth into". He later explained to Daniel Kilkelly of Digital Spy that Shane had not had an "'A-storyline' or story arc" since his introduction, and the majority of his plots had been on the fun side. Coghlan felt the serious nature of the storyline had tested him. He told Kilkelly "It's probably the first time I've really been put through my acting paces in a real sense. So it's good. It's been a long time coming, I suppose, but it's been really good to stretch the muscles." The actor also told Kilkelly that the storyline appears to resolve quite quickly, but it is only the beginning of a longer term arc. He commented that there is "a lot of trauma to be explored in this storyline, on lots of different characters." Coghlan believed the plot tapped into the character's past, saying "Because of Shane's criminal past in his backstory there's always been a darkness that needed to be revealed at some point. Maybe this is just the beginning!"

Coghlan told Hughes that stress over his studies was the main reason Shane started using drugs, as well as difficulty coping with everyday life. In addition to those issues, Coghlan also felt that plans for Shane and Dipi's 20th wedding anniversary contributed to Shane's notion that he is a failure, and stated that Shane has "a warped sense of masculine pride". Coghlan later explained that his character suffers from low self-esteem, and he feels worthless and like "he hasn't amounted to much in his life". He also worries about being judged by people, but especially his wife. Getting his degree would mean that he has been successful at something. He added "The course that he's taking is an accelerated programme – it's three years compressed into one or something like that! So the pressure is great and he's not coping." The actor confirmed that Shane initially took ADHD medication, before moving onto amphetamines to help him stay awake. Describing Shane's mindset about the drugs, Coghlan explained "This is typical impulsive behaviour from Shane, he has no concept of consequences and acts out based on a current need. He thought it wouldn't do much harm and he'd deal with the fallout later."

Roxy also becomes involved in the storyline, after she finds a bag of drugs in men's bathroom at The Waterhole and Shane admits that they belong to him. Roxy demands that Shane gets clean or she will tell Dipi, so Shane decides to go cold turkey in a hotel room. When asked how Shane gets Roxy to keep his secret, Coghlan replied that like any good addict, he bargains with her and tells her about his plan to go cold turkey. Coghlan called it "a complicated exchange", and believed that Shane was abusing his friendship with Roxy, as he knows she trusts him. He continued, "Their dynamic is reversed, Shane is now the wrongdoer, he is the child and Roxy is the adult!" Coghlan praised the scenes for being an "interesting progression of the relationship" and for continuing the exploration of the characters. He also said that things would get worse as Shane continues to manipulate Roxy, calling Shane's actions "fairly brutal" and "incredibly cruel" as he attempts to stop her from revealing his secret. Coghlan doubted if Shane could come back from what happens.

Shane is overwhelmed by the withdrawal effects, so he "doesn't try very hard" despite Roxy's help. Coghlan told Ellis that Shane also has some underlying psychological issues that he has to address. He added that Shane is so keen on keeping his addiction from Dipi that he does not consider his friendship with Roxy might be an issue with her. In an interview with Digital Spy's Daniel Kilkelly, Coghlan was hopeful that Shane and Dipi would be able to work things out, but warned that it would be difficult and "a long road ahead for them as a couple, regardless of what's happening."

=== Departure ===
On 24 March 2021, David Knox of TV Tonight reported that Coghlan would be departing Neighbours, alongside Johal, whose own departure had been announced a couple of weeks prior. Executive producer Jason Herbison confirmed that the characters' exit storyline would allow them to return in the future. He also stated: "From their opening scenes four years ago, Sharon and Nick were completely committed to their characters and performance. They embraced some really challenging storylines as well as capturing loads of fun moments which have endeared them to the Neighbours audience here and in the UK."

== Storylines ==
=== 1994–1995 ===
Shortly after leaving prison, Shane is reunited with his brother, Stonefish. After noticing a poster for a pool competition at The Waterhole, Shane decides to enter. He meets Julie Martin (Julie Mullins) and buys her several drinks, before joining Rick Alessi (Dan Falzon) and Sam Kratz (Richard Grieve) at the table. During the contest, Shane distracts Sam and his friend bumps the table causing him to sink his shot, giving Shane the win. Sam's grandmother, Marlene Kratz (Moya O'Sullivan) refuses to pay out due to the cheating and a brawl ensues. Shane's family buy and move into 32 Ramsay Street, Shane begins stealing from the neighbours. When Shane gives a stranded Marlene and Helen Daniels (Anne Haddy) a ride to an art market, Helen notices a few stolen goods in the back of his van. Shane then panics and drives off, leaving the women stranded once more. He is eventually arrested and the family move out of Number 32. While he is on bail, Shane is asked by his younger brother, Toadfish to take himself, Billy Kennedy (Jesse Spencer), and Justin Devine (Nick Jones) on a joyride in Karl Kennedy's (Alan Fletcher) car. Shane breaks the taillight while reversing, but is able to fix it. The following week, Shane is sentenced to six months imprisonment for burglary. Several months later, Shane escapes from prison and asks Stonie to hide him at Number 32, where he is lodging with Malcolm Kennedy (Benjamin McNair) and Danni Stark (Eliza Szonert). Stonie reluctantly agrees, but is annoyed when Shane spends the money he gives him on cigarettes. After being convinced to give himself up, Shane is eventually arrested and sent back to prison.

=== 2017–2021 ===
Shane returns to Erinsborough 22 years later, having been sent by his mother to check up on Toadie, who is going through marital problems. Shane and Toadie reunite on Ramsay Street, and Shane meets his niece Nell Rebecchi (Scarlett Anderson) for the first time. At an Easter picnic, Shane tells Toadie that he saw Toadie's estranged wife Sonya Rebecchi (Eve Morey) kissing Mark Brennan (Scott McGregor) earlier that day. Shane rents Number 32 and buys the lease for Harold's Café, before his wife Dipi Rebecchi (Sharon Johal) and their two daughters Yashvi Rebecchi (Olivia Junkeer) and Kirsha Rebecchi (Vani Dhir) arrive. Shane and his sister-in-law Mishti Sharma (Scarlet Vas) share several secretive conversations, making Dipi suspicious. Shane admits that he accepted a loan from Mishti, as he lost a lot of money working on a solar-powered lawnmower. Dipi later learns that Shane had to stop Mishti from going after the person responsible for her fiancé's death with her police service weapon. Dipi realises Mishti gave Shane the loan on the condition that he kept it from her. Shane reassures Dipi of his love by writing and performing a bush ballad for her. Aaron Brennan (Matt Wilson) finds an investor who wants to manufacture the lawnmower. Shane bonds with Karl when they join the Livability Committee. After Karl is removed as head of the committee, Shane is chosen in his place, but he is also asked to step down when he loses control of the lawnmower during a demonstration. Shane accuses Karl of sabotaging the lawnmower and they fight.

After Kirsha suffers hearing loss in an accident with some fireworks, Shane admits that he feels like he has failed as a parent. Shane and Yashvi help Kirsha to learn Auslan, and Shane invents a device that allows her to feel vibrations from music. When he pushes Kirsha out of the path of Jimmy Williams's (Darcy Tadich) bike, Shane suffers a dislocated thumb and a torn tendon in his hand. Shane arranges a meeting with entrepreneur Levi Jansen (Sam Allen) about his urine-powered generator, but when Levi cancels their meeting and leaves town, Shane gets drunk. He soon learns that it was Gary Canning (Damien Richardson) fault that Levi left and confronts him in the street. Shane kicks over some bins and snaps Gary's fishing rod, forcing Mishti to arrest him. Shane later acts on some poor business advice from Leo Tanaka (Tim Kano), and he loses Levi as a potential investor. Dipi accuses Leo of sabotaging the deal when he offers to take a generator for his backpackers hostel. Shane takes adult education classes in an effort to get his Year 12 certificate. Sheila Canning (Colette Mann) accuses Shane of cheating when he comes top in a biology test, but he insists that while he considered it, he did not cheat. Sheila offers Shane a job at The Waterhole as a barman, as he needs the money to hire a physiotherapist for his hand.

The Rebecchis are chosen as the Face of Lassiters Hotel and take part in a photoshoot for a promotional poster campaign. Shane decides to promote his new urine-to-water generator at Dipi's fundraiser for her musical Flapper, without telling anyone. When he admits the water they have been drinking was previously urine, Paul Robinson (Stefan Dennis) pulls his $5000 investment. Shane later offers Toadie his support when Toadie leans he has fathered another child with Andrea Somers (Madeleine West). When the Face of Lassiters posters are vandalised, Marisa Taylor (Shannon Barker) is presumed to have done it, as she previously racially abused Yashvi. Kirsha admits to Shane that she is responsible, as she hoped the family would be let go from the campaign, so she would not be bullied. Kirsha later tells Shane that Marisa is blackmailing her and he angrily confronts Marisa, who records him and posts the footage online, leading to the family being dropped from the campaign. Lassiters also pulls its financial support of Dipi's musical. Dipi struggles to forgive Shane, until he arranges for himself, Kirsha, Yashvi, Toadie and Sheila to put on a private performance of the musical in their back yard. Shane and Dipi are concerned when Mishti decides to have an arranged marriage, and Shane tries to keep Dipi from intervening.

After Shane ridicules Clive Gibbons (Geoff Paine) about needing Dipi's performance-enhancing tea to help him with his erectile problems, Clive informs Shane that Dipi has secretly been giving him the tea for years, which leads to Shane feeling embarrassed and inadequate. Shane hires Chloe Brennan (April Rose Pengilly) through her escort business to talk, after he sees Levi Jansen is a client of hers, but Dipi believes Shane is paying for sex and confronts them in the street. Back home, Shane questions whether he is enough for Dipi and points out that his inventions never seem to go anywhere. He also tells her that she looks at him differently since they left Bourke. Dipi says that she is proud of him for pursuing what he loves, but Shane is unconvinced. Amy's partner Dr. Rob Carson (Christopher Farrell) promotes Shane's recycled-urine water on his social media, and Shane begins selling bottles at The Wellness Centre. When Elly Conway (Jodi Anasta) falls ill, she initially blames the water and Gary tells Shane that he never should have trusted him. Elly soon learns from Aaron that she has food poisoning and she apologises to Shane. Gary also apologises for losing his temper and they shake hands. During a promotional event for the water, Rob sprays the audience with urine after learning Amy is now dating Gary, however, Shane is glad of the publicity.

After Mishti gets engaged, she chooses to relocate to Sydney and at her farewell party, she thanks Shane and Dipi for taking care of her and supporting her. Shane gets a high enough ATAR result that allows him to pursue an engineering degree at the university. Dipi is hospitalised after being attacked by Gary, who mistook her for someone else. She suffers a severe allergic reaction during a scan and goes into cardiac arrest, but soon recovers. Shane takes out his anger on Sheila and throws her out of Dipi's hospital room. Days later, Shane finds Gary in his house bonding with Dipi over recipes and physically man-handles Gary out the door and into the street. After Yashvi and Kirsha are held hostage by Raymond Renshaw (Frank Magree), Dipi struggles in the aftermath and she spends more time with Gary. Yashvi fears they are having an affair and Shane confronts Gary, before he and Dipi agree to communicate better and be more supportive of one another. Shortly before Sonya dies from ovarian cancer, she enlists Shane's help to visit Andrea. She later confides in him that Andrea believes Toadie's former wife Dee Bliss (Madeleine West) is still alive, as a man she met in Hobart mistook her for Dee. Shane later tells Dipi this information and they decide not to tell Toadie, until he returns from a trip to the United States with the children.

After their house is sold, Shane and his family move in with Toadie. Shane and Dipi talk to Mark Brennan about Andrea, and he advises them to contact her, but she refuses to see them. Toadie asks Shane and Dipi to move out when they pack up Sonya's belongings, but he changes his mind as he needs their support. Shane later realises Toadie has not been to the garden nursery since Sonya's death, and organises a small gathering of Toadie's friends to help him move forward. Mark informs Shane that he has located Andrea and Shane visits her by himself, where she tells him about the man who recognised her as a woman named Karen. Believing that this could be Dee, Shane asks Andrea for her help and brings her back to Erinsborough. He also asks Mark to continue investigating Andrea's claims, and it later emerges that Dee is alive and Andrea is trying to con Toadie again. She is arrested when Dee turns up in Erinsborough. Shane sees Yashvi on a date with Ned Willis (Ben Hall) and cross-examines them. Ned later tells Shane that he plans on taking things slowly with Yashvi. Shane and Dipi realise Dee is in love with Toadie and ask her to take a step back for his and Nell and Hugo sake. When Dee avoids Toadie completely, Shane and Dipi have to tell Toadie what they said to Dee.

Shane and Yashvi's relationship becomes strained when she forgets a father-daughter date to spend time with Ned. She attempts to move out and Dipi bribes her with a car. They later learn from Ned that Yashvi was never going to move in with him, and Shane explains to Dipi that he does not like the person Yashvi is becoming, which she overhears. When Yashvi fails an English essay, Shane blames Ned for distracting her and asks him to break up with her. However, Yashvi tells him that she was unable to concentrate because she overheared him. They soon reconcile their differences. New Erinsborough High student Mackenzie Hargreaves (Georgie Stone) shows an interest in Shane and Yashvi suspects that she might be Shane's daughter, after finding a photo of him and Mackenzie's mother. Mackenzie soon reveals that she has asked Shane to help find her father Grant Hargreaves (Paul Mercurio), and that she and Yashvi used to know each other in primary school, but Mackenzie was known as Michael and has since transitioned. Shane defends Mackenzie when Ollie Sudekis (Ellmir Asipi) makes transphobic comments towards her by grabbing the boy and pushing him up against a wall. Ollie's mother decides not to take the matter further after learning what her son said.

Shane becomes invested in finding Mackenzie's father, and soon gets a lead. He also realises that he played a part in their estrangement and explains to Mackenzie that her father told him about her feminine belongings and he encouraged Grant to get rid of them, which resulted in Grant burning them. Mackenzie feels betrayed and Yashvi tells him that she is ashamed of him. Grant soon contacts Shane and comes to Erinsborough to meet Mackenzie, but when he admits that Mackenzie is and always will be his son, Shane admonishes him for being narrow-minded. When Grant leaves town, Shane takes his place in the father-daughter dance at the school formal. Toadie and Shane fall out when Toadie helps Kirsha with a scholarship application to a school in Sydney. When Kirsha is accepted into the school, Dipi initially refuses to let her go, but Shane realises that it will be good for Kirsha. Once she leaves, Dipi turns on Shane and Toadie and blames them for Kirsha leaving. Shane later tries to get in between Dipi and Gary's friendship, having notices their closeness. Shane's co-worker Roxy Willis (Zima Anderson) confides in him about being a donor match for David Tanaka (Takaya Honda) and he provides her with advice and support. Dipi becomes concerned about their friendship, especially when Shane drops everything to help a drunken Roxy, but he assures her that they are just co-workers.

When he notices Sheila has put himself and Roxy on different shifts, Shane accuses Dipi of interfering, but Sheila admits that she changed the rosters. When Shane fills in for another co-worker, Roxy kisses him at the end of their shift. He quickly leaves, and later says that he plans on telling Dipi what happened, but Roxy begs him not to. Roxy eventually tells Dipi about the kiss, causing tension between Shane and Dipi, who moves in with the Cannings. Karl provides Shane with unwanted updates about Dipi and Gary, and later tells him that he saw Dipi kiss Gary. Shane confront his wife, but they both realise that neither of them wanted to hurt the other and reconcile. Following Gary's death, Shane struggles to support a grieving Dipi. He is later offered an accelerated degree program at Eden Hills University, and the Rebecchis take in Mackenzie when her aunt moves out of town. Shane contacts Grant upon Mackenzie's 18 birthday and learns that he has had a workplace accident. Grant comes to Erinsborough to legal advice from Toadie and Shane admits to Dipi that he loaned Grant some money, which causes tension between them. Shane also clashes with Ned, who has quit his job to focus more on his art and took a small loan from Dipi. Shane becomes stressed with his university assignments and work, leading him to take amphetamines. His behaviour changes and he is noticeably tired.

Roxy learns about Shane's addiction when she finds some of his drugs in The Waterhole bathroom. He admits that he felt wiped out by his university course and needed a way to stay up all night. Roxy urges him to tell Dipi, but he refuses. He later decides to go cold turkey, but he struggles with withdrawal symptoms and Roxy tries to help him with mindfulness techniques. Shane begins taking drugs again and angrily insults Roxy when she finds them in his bag. He also misses a romantic dinner with Dipi to buy more pills from his study partner River Hanlon (Andrew Coshan). When Roxy attempts to throw his pills down the sink, Shane physically grabs her arm and wrestles the bag off her. Roxy cries out and Kyle Canning (Chris Milligan) intervenes and demands an explanation. Shane is unable to say anything and Kyle tells Dipi what happened, which causes her to think that Shane has been suffering with depression. She and Toadie stage an intervention and urge Shane to get help, so he tells them that he will go and stay with Stonie in Colac. Toadie later learns what has been happening from Roxy and he finds Shane hiding out in a shed in Bourke. He brings him home, where Shane tries to get through his wedding anniversary dinner with Dipi, but eventually tells her he is a drug addict. He explains that he started using Richie Amblin's (Lachlan Millar) ADHD medication, before River offered him something stronger. Yashvi is forced to take Shane to the police station for questioning, while Dipi arranges for him to go to rehab. Shane ends up leaving rehab early and tries to work on his beating his addiction himself.

Dipi tells Shane that she has been having an affair with Pierce and she moves out to stay with Sheila. Shane struggles with Dipi's silence and he is briefly tempted to take Richie's ADHD medication, but with Toadie's support, he attends an NA meeting instead. Shane and Dipi's son Jay makes a surprise visit, and Shane confronts Pierce in public when he learns that he is trying to fix his own marriage. The pair later get into a physical fight when they have to collect their sons from a schoolies campsite.

== Reception ==
The character's earlier appearance and storylines led a writer for Inside Soap to brand him a "dodgy" character, while a columnist for Women's Day dubbed him "notorious". They also commented that the other Ramsay Street residents "should be on high alert" due to his reputation. Radio Times writer Johnathon Hughes said Shane and his family's introduction hailed "a whole new era for Neighbours' classic Rebecchi clan". The character's arrival also led to a reporter for the Liverpool Echo to comment that "he's about to make a very big splash indeed." Critics thought the character's reappearance was good for Toadie. Sarah Ellis of Inside Soap wrote "Shane's support is exactly what Toadie needs right now, so the arrival of even more Rebecchis can only be good news for him." Shane's arrival was also chosen as of "The best bits of April" in the Inside Soap Yearbook 2018. Calling him one of the month's "great additions to soapland", a writer stated "There was finally something for Toadie to smile about, when his big brother Shane rocked up on Ramsay Street!"

Ben Fenlon of the Daily Express observed that Shane's solar-powered lawnmower "continued to provide light relief for viewers" amongst the dramatic storylines. An Evening Chronicle reporter thought Shane's urine-to-water converter "has plenty of potential", but they warned "launching it at the same time as Dipi's investor lunch for Flapper! The Musical is probably not the best of ideas." Shane's anger towards Gary led Fenlon's colleague Charlie Milward to brand him "hot-headed". Bridget McManus of The Sydney Morning Herald called Shane Mackenzie's "biggest Erinsborough champion", as she reviewed their scenes together.

Alex Davies noted fans of the show were "captivated" by Shane and Roxy's "will-they-won't-they romance", and he found that viewers hoped the pair would take things further. As scenes of Dipi kissing Gary aired, Katie Baillie of the Metro observed that Shane and Dipi's "marriage appears to be doomed. If it's not Shane kissing the Neighbours, it's Dipi." Radio Times' Johnathon Hughes said drug addiction was "a shocking new storyline" for the "lovable dad".
