= Gary Canning =

Fictional character from the Australian soap opera Neighbours

- Neighbours character
- Portrayed by: Damien Richardson
- Duration: 2014–2020
- First appearance: 7 November 2014
- Last appearance: 20 March 2020
- Introduced by: Jason Herbison
- Spin-off appearances: Summer Stories (2016); Neighbours vs Time Travel (2017)
In-universe information
- Occupation: Handyman; Hotel cleaner; Chef; Manager of The Flametree Retreat; Barista
- Father: Frank Canning
- Mother: Sheila Canning
- Brothers: Frank Canning Jr.
- Sisters: Naomi Canning
- Wife: Sharon Canning (divorced); Brooke Butler (divorced)
- Sons: Kyle Canning
- Daughters: Xanthe Canning
- Nieces: Kylie Canning

Gary Canning is a fictional character from the Australian soap opera Neighbours, played by Damien Richardson. He made his first appearance during the episode broadcast on 7 November 2014. Richardson previously appeared in the show in 1992. Following his first stint as Gary, Richardson reprised the role in late 2015 and returned the following year in a regular capacity. Gary is portrayed as an easy-going, work shy bogan. He was introduced as the estranged father of Kyle Canning (Chris Milligan), and his early storylines focused on his attempts to reconnect with his family. After accepting money from Paul Robinson (Stefan Dennis) to beat Ezra Hanley (Steve Nation), Gary was sent to prison.

A year later, the character was reintroduced, and he was reunited with his mother and teenage daughter. Gary's relationship with Terese Willis (Rebekah Elmaloglou) has faced several obstacles, including the return of his former partner Brooke Butler (Fifi Box), Terese's cancer diagnosis and infidelity. Others storylines have seen Gary arrested for assault, a feud with Karl Kennedy (Alan Fletcher), and financial difficulties. The character was killed off on 20 March 2020. Bridget McManus from The Sydney Morning Herald has praised Richardson in the role, but thought he was "underutilised", while other critics have expressed their sympathy for Gary.

== Casting ==
On 15 October 2014, Daniel Kilkelly of Digital Spy reported that the estranged father of established character Kyle Canning (Chris Milligan), would soon be introduced for a guest stint. Kilkelly confirmed that the character's scenes had already been filmed and his presence would "shake up life for the popular Canning family." Richardson's casting as Gary was announced on 3 November. He had previously appeared in Neighbours in the guest role of Kim White in 1992.

== Development ==
=== Characterisation and early storylines ===
The official website describes Gary as being "an easy-going likeable bloke who enjoys nothing more than lazy afternoons at the pub with a few mates, or long days with a fishing rod at some quiet spot." Gary also enjoys getting to know new people, and often uses his sense of humour to ease tense social situations. Although he is skilled as a handyman, Gary dislikes hardwork and will try to take short cuts to make easy money. In 2016, Gary takes up pigeon racing as a hobby. Richardson joked that the birds were great to work with. He also said Gary was doing his best to stay out of prison, saying that for now, "Gary's on the straight and narrow".

In his fictional backstory, Gary walked out on his family when Kyle was only eight years old, and he did not see or speak to his son for sixteen years. When Gary asks his mother Sheila Canning (Colette Mann) for money, Kyle's wife Georgia Brooks (Saskia Hampele) contacts him and asks that he visit Kyle, who has longed for a relationship with his father. Milligan explained that if he was in Kyle's shoes he would want answers as to why Gary left the family and did not attempt to contact him. When Gary and Kyle come face-to-face, Kyle is not sure if he should hit or hug his father. Milligan explained, "Kyle has really wanted his dad to come back and be part of his life for so long, but when he does, he doesn't know how he is feeling or how to react with his emotions. It's going to be a bit of a shake-up, but hopefully it works out for them!" Milligan praised Richardson's casting, believing that his portrayal of Gary showed viewers where Kyle inherited his "bogan and larrikin attitude from". He added that there were a few similarities between Gary and Kyle, like their stupidity and their jobs as handymen, which made them "a great father-son mix". As well as Kyle and Sheila, Gary is also reunited with his sister Naomi Canning (Morgana O'Reilly).

Naomi tires of Sheila's "blatant favouritism" of Gary, and tries to get him to reveal an event from his "dark past" that they both know about. It soon emerges that Gary carried out an assault on Ezra Hanley (Steve Nation) in exchange for money from Paul Robinson (Stefan Dennis). As Gary prepares to leave town, Sheila confronts him and asks him to give himself up to the police, but Gary flees the house. Sheila suffers a heart attack, which Naomi initially blames herself for causing. But when Gary arrives at the hospital, he soon admits that he and Sheila had a big argument after she learned that he attacked Ezra. Naomi is "furious" with her brother, so she tells Kyle that the real reason Gary walked out on his family all those years ago was because he took part in a robbery and went on the run. A devastated Kyle then calls the police on his father. Shortly before Gary is taken to jail, Sheila comes to visit him at the police station. She blames herself for how he has turned out, but Gary assures her that she is a great mother. Gary is "delighted" when Kyle eventually walks in and they say their goodbyes.

=== Reintroduction ===
"While Gary seems to be a reformed character after two years in prison, fans can expect to see him making one parental blunder after another – all under Sheila's watchful eye. With the financial pressures of raising a teenager to consider too, can Gary really stay on the straight and narrow, or will he make even more poor choices for the sake of his daughter?"

— Daniel Kilkelly of Digital Spy on Gary's return. (2016)

In October 2015, Mann hinted that a member of the Canning family would be returning to the show. The following day, it was confirmed that Richardson had reprised the role of Gary and had returned to filming, with Gary's return set to air in early 2016. Ahead of his reappearance, Gary's teenage daughter Xanthe Canning (Lily Van der Meer) was introduced. Xanthe was unaware that her father was in prison when she arrived in Erinsborough. When Kyle rejects a visiting order from Gary, Xanthe asks Sheila to take her to the jail to see him instead. Things are initially awkward, but Xanthe is delighted to be reunited with her father. Gary then reveals that he could be getting out of prison soon, and Sheila invites him to live with them once he is released. When Kyle learns of the invitation, he visits Gary and explains his concerns for Xanthe, who he feels needs people in her life who are going to stay around and look after her. Sheila is soon informed that Gary has been involved in a fight with another inmate and his parole will no longer be processed, leading her to realise that Gary started the fight on purpose.

Gary returned on 14 June 2016. He shows up in the prison yard just as Paul Robinson is close to being beaten up by the other inmates, who want protection money from him. Dennis called it "an interesting twist" as it seems Gary is coming to his rescue, while Paul is the reason Gary is in prison in the first place. He continued, "They have a strained relationship, so I don't know if Gary will want to help Paul..." Paul asks for Gary's help in keeping him safe, but Gary does not want to, so Paul tries to con him and Sheila into helping. Gary later has "a confusing conversation" with Paul, that leads Paul to think that Gary has got his back. However, Gary refuses to help Paul, as he has just been granted parole. Paul later ends up in the hospital after being badly assaulted. Richardson wanted to explore Gary and Paul's time in prison further, and thought it would have been fun if they were put in the same cell.

A couple of months after Gary returns home, Xanthe accuses her classmate Cooper Knights (Charlie Hannaford) of sexually assaulting her. Cooper is later attacked and Gary becomes the prime suspect, which later leads to his arrest. Richardson admitted that Gary was "definitely capable" of committing the attack, going by his history. Richardson told an Inside Soap writer, "He's very frustrated with the way the school is dealing with the issue, and he thinks he can handle it in a much more immediate way." Despite having an alibi from Paul for the time of Cooper's attack, it soon emerges that Cooper was assaulted 15 minutes earlier than the police first thought, meaning Gary is back on top of their suspects list. Richardson explained that all the evidence points toward Gary, and if he is found guilty then his parole will be revoked and he will go back to prison. The actor added, "things are looking very bleak indeed at this point." Ben Kirk (Felix Mallard) later learns that it was Cooper's mother who attacked him, and Xanthe is grateful to him for saving Gary from returning to prison.

=== Relationship with Terese Willis ===
In August 2016, Gary was romantically paired with Terese Willis (Rebekah Elmaloglou). Gary begins interacting with Terese more when he is paid by Paul to steal her strategy file for the upcoming sale of Lassiters Hotel. Gary goes along with Paul's plan, as he is cash-strapped. Gary soon develops feelings for Terese, and Richardson thought Gary was "batting well above his average". He explained, "Any man that thinks he has the chance of attracting a woman out of his league; you know it's hard to say no. She represents someone who Gary wouldn't have seen himself being with. I mean she owns something. She's corporate." The actor also said Gary feels bad about lying and deceiving Terese, but he has found himself in an awkward situation. Gary has been forced into choosing "the wrong course of action." Gary wins a pigeon race organised by Terese and uses the prize money to clear his debt with Paul. Terese later offers him a job at the hotel, but rescinds the offer when Gary's pigeon is disqualified for doping. Xanthe later admits that she accidentally drugged the bird, which Terese finds amusing and she "spontaneously" asks Gary out to dinner. However, Gary becomes involved in a family matter and stands Terese up, leaving Paul to take his place.

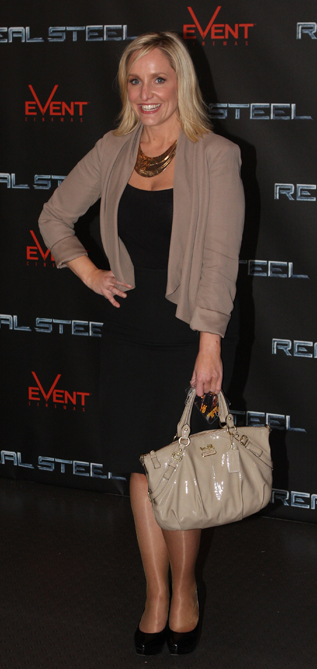
In 2016, Gary ends his relationship with Terese to reconcile with his former partner Brooke Butler, played by Fifi Box (pictured).

Gary and Terese continue to get closer, and Sheila attempts to give him advice on how to win Terese over. Instead, Gary bonds with Terese over parental challenges and she invites him to have coffee with her. Gary tells Terese how he would seduce and kiss her, which gets Terese "all hot and bothered." But she worries about Gary's past and her reputation, and decides that their relationship should stay professional. However, she later kisses him, and he kisses her back. Terese is adamant their relationship should stay a secret and Gary agrees to respect her wishes. When Terese learns the man who was responsible for her son's death has been released from jail, she turns to Gary for support. They soon share a kiss, which Paul witnesses. Shortly before the Canning family's appearance on Family Feud, Xanthe accidentally reveals that Gary is dating Terese. An argument between Sheila and Gary plays out in front of the cameras. Sheila is "furious" with the news, as Terese is her boss. Not long after, Xanthe's mother Brooke Butler (Fifi Box) comes to Erinsborough. She grows jealous of Gary's relationship with Terese, and she pretends that she still has feelings for Gary.

Gary reconciles with Brooke, but Xanthe suspects that her mother is planning on scamming him. She warns her father, but Gary assures her that he would know if Brooke was planning on conning him. Brooke later persuades Gary to give her his Family Feud winnings by claiming the jewellery she has sold to the neighbours is being held at Customs. Brooke leaves town when it emerges that the jewellery she sold was fake. Gary and Terese get back together, but their relationship is threatened by Brooke's reappearance. Terese is "horrified" when the Cannings allow Brooke to stay with them. She soon suspects that Gary is cheating on her when she notices their secretive conversations. Gary explains that he is trying to help Brooke reunite with her daughter Jessie, but Terese feels she cannot trust him and ends their relationship. A love triangle develops when Brooke realises she loves Gary, but Gary insists that he loves Terese. Brooke then encourages Gary to propose to Terese, believing that she will reject him and Gary will give up on their relationship. Brooke's plan backfires when Gary and Terese reconcile, and Terese accepts Gary's proposal.

Gary and Terese's relationship is strained when she is diagnosed with breast cancer. Terese initially keeps her diagnosis and treatment from Gary and her daughter, Piper Willis (Mavournee Hazel). Gary becomes concerned about her odd behaviour and suspects she is either pregnant or has relapsed into alcoholism, until Terese tells him and Piper about her diagnosis. Elmaloglou said Gary becomes "very supportive" during Terese's treatment. Gary seeks alternative treatments for Terese when her chemotherapy fails, and he later asks her incarcerated brother Nick Petrides (Damien Fotiou) for his help. When Terese learns that her tumours have shrunk, she tells Paul first and they have sex. She returns home to a surprise engagement party organised by Gary. Elmaloglou told Johnathon Hughes of the Radio Times that Terese and Paul have "a shared, spontaneous moment", but she does feel guilty about cheating on Gary. Elmaloglou added, "She knows how much Gary loves her and, despite what she's just done, she loves Gary too." The actress wanted Terese to marry Gary and gain some stability in her life.

During their wedding ceremony, Terese admits to Gary that she cheated on him with Paul. Elmaloglou commented that Gary is "absolutely devastated and in shock. And he's angry, too..." Gary returns to work, but finds that the Lassiters Hotel staff are gossiping about his failed wedding to Terese. Gary is later asked to throw away a couch from Terese's office and Paul reveals that it is the couch that he and Terese had sex on. On the advice on his co-worker, Gary decides to get revenge on Terese by publicly humiliating her at the Lassiters complex re-opening ceremony. He places the couch in the middle of the new walkway and writes "Cheater" on it.

=== Feud and debt ===
Following Brooke's departure, Gary begins feuding with neighbour Karl Kennedy (Alan Fletcher), who bought some of the fake jewellery from Brooke. The Canning and Kennedy families sit down together to sort out their issues. Karl's wife Susan Kennedy (Jackie Woodburne) suggests that they should move on and forget about the money, but Gary insists that he will pay them back despite having no money. Needing to get out of debt, Gary meets with ex-con Kev McNally (Troy Davis) and arranges to carry out some illegal jobs for him. Gary's first job is to move some stolen goods from a car, but he soon finds the car has gone missing. Gary turns to Tyler Brennan (Travis Burns) for help and he eventually finds the car, but it is empty. Gary later accidentally attacks Karl, thinking it was Kev. He tells Sheila that he is in debt and realising that she knows Kev's father, Sheila decides to seduce him to rectify the situation.

=== Departure ===
The character was killed off during the show's 35th anniversary episodes on 20 March 2020. Daniel Kilkelly (Digital Spy) confirmed that Richardson had left the cast and would be removed from the show's opening titles the following week. Finn Kelly (Rob Mills) shoots Gary with a bow and arrow, as he attempts to rescue Harlow Robinson (Jemma Donovan) and Bea Nilsson (Bonnie Anderson), who are being held hostage by Finn in a mineshaft. In the aftermath, Kyle is left to inform Sheila, who demands that Gary's autopsy is fast-tracked in order to bring her closure. Richardson revealed that when he quit the role, he asked producers for Gary to be killed off by either Paul or Finn, something Mills "appreciated". Richardson said that Gary ended in a "blaze of glory".

== Storylines ==
Gary contacts his mother Sheila Canning and asks for money. Sheila tries to persuade Gary to visit his son Kyle, but he refuses. However, he changes his mind when Kyle's wife Georgia begs him not to walk away from his son. Gary and Kyle initially struggle to bond. Gary explains that he left his family to protect them, after he witnessed a robbery and was seen by the perpetrators. Gary decides to stay around and he helps Kyle out with his handyman business. Gary and his sister Naomi agree not to tell Kyle that they have been meeting up over the years. One day, Gary leaves Kyle's toolbox unlocked and someone steals the tools. He tries to buy some second-hand tools to help Kyle, before getting a job to compensate his son. Paul Robinson pays Gary to beat up Ezra Hanley. Sheila sees Gary taking payment from Paul and confronts him. She urges her son to turn himself in, but he leaves. Gary later hears that Sheila has had a heart attack and he goes to the hospital, where he admits that it is his fault Sheila is ill. Naomi then tells Kyle that Gary walked out on him as he was actually the getaway driver in the robbery. Kyle reports Gary to the police. Gary also confesses that Paul paid him to assault Ezra. After Paul is questioned, he pays Gary to change his story. Gary offers the money to Kyle and Naomi, but they refuse to take it. Before Gary is taken to jail, Sheila and Kyle visit him to say their goodbyes.

A year later, Gary sends a visiting order to Kyle, but Sheila and his newly arrived, teenage daughter Xanthe come instead. Gary reveals that he is eligible for parole. After Kyle asks Gary not to let Xanthe down when he gets out, Gary deliberately gets into a fight and his parole is revoked. Months later, Gary encounters Paul in the prison yard. Paul asks Gary for protection and later begs Gary for help when the other inmates threaten to beat him, but Gary refuses as he is being released. At home, Gary finds a missing Xanthe and learns that she took $10,000 from Tom Quill (Kane Felsinger). Gary tells Tom that he will not receive any more repayments, as he believes the money was illegally gained to begin with, since Tom did not report the theft to the police. After Paul is released, Gary apologises for leaving him and Paul gives him a cleaning job at his motel. When Xanthe needs a tutor and a prom dress, Gary struggles financially and he asks ex-con Kev McNally for work. He later decides to get a loan from Paul, who also asks him to spy on his business rival, Terese Willis. Gary is arrested for attacking Cooper Knights, a student who assaulted Xanthe. Ben Kirk soon learns that Cooper's mother was the assailant. Gary enters a pigeon race and wins, but he is disqualified after officials find his bird was doped. Xanthe admits that she gave the pigeon paracetamol. Terese asks Gary on a date.

Gary and Terese date in secret, until Xanthe reveals the relationship to Sheila, while the family are on Family Feud. Xanthe's mother Brooke Butler comes to town and Gary reconciles his relationship with her. Brooke makes several jewellery sales and then persuades Gary to give her money, as the jewellery is being held at customs. She soon leaves town and Gary is forced to seek extra work to pay back those who she cheated. Gary feuds with Karl Kennedy, who bought some of the jewellery. He contacts Kev again, who offers him a job moving stolen goods from a car. Gary finds the car is missing and enlists Tyler Brennan's help to find it. After locating the car, Gary discovers it is empty and Kev tells him he now owes $30,000. Sheila speaks with Kev's father, who reveals Kev stole the laptops and set Gary up. Gary and Terese get back together, but shortly after Brooke returns and tries to make amends. Gary offers to help her reconnect with her daughter, Jessie. Their behaviour leads Terese to think Gary is cheating on her and she ends their relationship. Brooke persuades Gary to propose to Terese, who accepts. Terese has an allergic reaction to Gary's engagement ring, and he steals a replacement from the hotel's lost property box.

After noticing Terese exhibiting odd behaviour, Gary thinks she is either pregnant or drinking again, but she admits that she has breast cancer. Gary is supportive and tries to convince Terese to cut back on her work hours. When her treatment fails to work, Gary seeks out alternatives and approaches her brother, and former oncologist, Nick Petrides in prison. When Paul and Gary argue over Terese's new treatment, Gary learns that Terese told Paul about her diagnosis before him. Gary accidentally tells Terese's boss Jasmine Udagawa (Kaori Maeda-Judge) about her cancer, leading the Udagawas to withdraw their investment. Gary arranges a surprise engagement party for Terese. He later interviews for a chefs job at a local restaurant, but John Rotondo (Vincent Gorceis) turns him down. After John offers him an illegal oyster-fishing job, Gary follows him to Lassiters and realises Paul tried to set him up. On their wedding day, Terese pulls Gary aside and confesses to having sex with Paul. Days later, Gary returns to work and his colleague tells him to get revenge. While moving a couch from Terese's office, Paul tells Gary he and Terese had sex on it. Gary places the couch in the middle of Lassiters with the word "Cheater" painted on it to humiliate Terese.

While he is in The Waterhole, Gary is propositioned by Caro Watts (Janine Atwill), who gives him her hotel key card. He later reassures Terese that nothing happened with Caro. Gary is rushed to hospital after he inhales toxic fumes from cleaning fluid. When Terese visits him, he tells her he wants to give their relationship another go. Hamish Roche's (Sean Taylor) body is found in the Cannings spa, and Gary and Sheila becomes suspects in his murder. Gary asks Paul for an alibi and Paul agrees, but only if Gary breaks up with Terese. Gary and Sheila realise that they thought each other had killed Hamish, but neither of them did. Gary tells the police that he cleaned up the crime scene and is charged with obstruction of justice. Terese forgives Gary for going to Paul for help instead of her, and they go on a camping trip. She later offers him a trial in the Lassiters kitchen, but he annoys the head chef by making several mistakes. Gary enrols in a TAFE course to qualify as a chef. After catering for the launch of The Flametree Retreat, Stephanie Scully (Carla Bonner) offers Gary a job.

Gary learns that Xanthe and Ben are in a sexual relationship. When Gary sees them together at the hotel, he uses his master key to enter a room to stop them. But he ends up scaring hotel guest Levi Jansen (Sam Allen), who cancels a meeting with Shane Rebecchi (Nicholas Coghlan). Terese bars Gary from the hotel, while Shane confronts him in the street and breaks his fishing pole. Gary and Terese get back together, but he suspects that she still has feelings for Paul. Gary suspicions grow when he learns that Terese has engineered a reason for him to be delayed at work. He later finds Terese on the Lassiters mezzanine, where she proposes to him and he accepts. While they are spending a night at the hotel, Gary finds Terese and Paul together in her office for a phone call. Gary decides to end the relationship. He later accompanies Terese for her post-cancer check-up, telling her he will always support her. Steph gives Gary a trial as manager of the retreat, but reconsiders when Xanthe and Piper have their drinks spiked at a party. Sheila urges her to keep Gary on and Steph agrees. Fay Brennan (Zoe Bertram) asks Gary on a date. Sheila encourages him to accept, as she suspects Fay is laundering money through The Waterhole and needs evidence. Gary learns Fay is not doing anything illegal, but he humiliates her when she overhears him telling Sheila that he is not interested in dating her.

Xanthe is deliberately struck by Elly Conway's (Jodi Anasta) car. Gary initially blames Elly for Xanthe's injuries, but Xanthe later confirms that Finn Kelly was driving, so Gary goes to his apartment and trashes it. Gary meets with Finn's former cellmate Jeremy Sluggett (Tamblyn Lord) to ask for his whereabouts. Jeremy promises to give Gary the information, as long as Gary holds onto $100,000 for him for a week. They arrange for Jeremy to pick up the money from the retreat, but Gary's new employee Sindi Watts (Marisa Warrington) turns up unexpectedly and Jeremy knocks her unconscious. Jeremy is arrested and the money is returned to Gary, who uses some of it to fund Xanthe's medical treatments. Gary considers using Jeremy's money to help Xanthe pay for a private university. He asks for a bank loan instead, and he secures one when Steph gives him a new contract and a pay rise. Gary admits to Xanthe that he is lonely, and that he has feelings for Amy Williams (Zoe Cramond). After learning that the loan will not come through for two weeks, Gary uses Jeremy's money for Xanthe's university fees, intending to replace it with the loan. However, after one of Steph's friends see him fighting with Shane, Steph rescinds his pay rise and the bank cancel the loan. Jeremy's mother Nance Sluggett (Denise Drysdale) comes to collect his money, but deduces that Gary does not have it. She asks him for free treatments and then a job in return for derailing Jeremy's parole hearing. However, when she clashes with Sheila, Nance cancels the deal.

Gary tells his family and Amy about his situation, and Amy gifts him the money to pay Nance. Gary then declares his love for Amy, who breaks up with her boyfriend Rob Carson (Christopher Farrell) to be with him. Steph fires Gary after learning the truth about his deal with Jeremy, while Paul refuses to accept Gary and Amy's relationship, leading Amy to move in with Gary. Paul uses to Jeremy to try and set Gary up, but Gary realises what is happening and goads Paul, who punches him. Terese hires Gary as a barista at the pavilion coffee hut and he delivers stolen goods for Kev McNally to pay Amy back faster. He later discovers that he is moving solar converters stolen from Amy's Robinson Heights project. Kev agrees to let Gary quit if he retrieves a remote that was left behind at the site. Sheila catches Gary with the remote and he asks that she keeps it from Amy. Kev asks Gary to do another job, but Gary turns it down and Kev has some of the stolen converters placed in the coffee hut. Gary returns later that night to move them, but when he sees someone near the hut, he grabs them and throws them against the building. He soon realises he has attacked Dipi Rebecchi (Sharon Johal), who is left bruised and concussed. Shane vents his anger at Gary, while Amy learns the truth about the robbery and stolen converters in the coffee hut. She helps Sheila get rid of them and then breaks up with Gary.

Gary is encouraged to change his life around. He convinces Xanthe to leave Erinsborough to pursue her studies in Toowoomba or everything he did will have been for nothing. He apologises to Dipi properly and they bond over recipes, angering Shane and leading Sheila to suspect they are having an affair. They make it clear that they are just friends, and Gary focuses on trying to find and job and reconciling with Amy. Toadie gives Gary some work at the garden nursery and he gets a job in a warehouse, but he struggles to remember the instructions given to him due to tiredness and is knocked unconscious by some falling boxes. Amy finds Gary and he recovers in hospital. Amy admits that she wants to get back together, but only if Gary tells Sheila to back off, which he does. Gary proposes to Amy, but they are interrupted by Kyle who has returned to Erinsborough to take over Amy's former job at the Robinson Pines development. Amy accepts Gary's proposal and moves back in with him and Sheila. Gary reads out Xanthe's statement at Finn's sentencing hearing and is sure that he will be sent to prison, however, Finn is released into the Kennedys' care, causing tension between them and the Cannings.

After learning that Kyle is in love with Amy, Gary arranges a secret wedding, but Amy shuts it down. After a short break away, Amy returns and tells Gary that their engagement is still on. Gary and Kyle put in a tender for Karl's tram business. Karl chooses them both, forcing them to work together to turn the tram into a restaurant. Gary becomes competitive with Kyle, and fails to secure some scaffolding correctly, resulting in Kyle falling to the ground and straining their relationship. Gary suspects that Kyle and Amy have feelings for each other, leading him to agree to try for a baby with Amy. However, Amy overhears Gary admitting that he does not want another child, and she realises that she is content with the life she has with him. Gary learns that Sheila and Paul teamed up to split him and Amy up. He struggles to forgive Sheila and vents his anger at Paul, who is attacked later that night, leaving Gary as the prime suspect. Roxy Willis (Zima Anderson) tells the police that she saw Gary attack Paul, leading to his arrest. The charges are dropped when it emerges that Vance Abernethy (Conrad Coleby) attacked Paul. Gary realises Amy is in love with Kyle and he ends their relationship. Gary later goes on dates with two of Paul's former wives; Rebecca Napier (Jane Hall) and Gail Lewis (Fiona Corke). Gary then meets and bonds with Prudence Wallace (Denise van Outen) at The Waterhole.

Gary and Prue go on a few dates, until Prue's daughter Harlow Robinson warns Gary away. Harlow later apologises and Gary and Prue arrange another date. As Prue waits for Gary to finish work, he catches her attempting to take money from the tram's till. Prue reveals she is part of an organisation called the Restoration Order, but she cannot afford to pay her monthly fee. Gary loans Prue the money on the condition she tells him more about the Order. When Prue has to go back to England, Gary and Amy realise that she has deceived Harlow and is planning on bringing her into the Order. Gary and Paul find Harlow at a milk bar, where Prue left her, and bring her home. Gary later tells Harlow that although Prue left, she does love her and shows her a video of them dancing together. Gary and Dipi start spending more time together after her marriage becomes strained, and Shane tries to insert himself into their friendship. After Dipi learns Roxy kissed Shane, she moves in with Gary and Sheila. Gary is wary about how close he and Dipi are becoming, but she reassures him that she values their friendship. Dipi later kisses Gary and Shane learns about it from Karl. He and Dipi talk through their issues and she moves back home. Gary objects when Finn begins tutoring Harlow, as he is reminded of the situation with Xanthe years earlier. Gary goes to London to look for Prue and get her out of the Order. Prue later joins Gary in Erinsborough and reveals that she has left the Order and that she and Gary are engaged. Despite opposition from their families, Terese arranges for Prue and Gary to get married at the Lassiters wedding expo the following week. On his wedding day, Gary learns that Prue did not leave the Order for him, but rather she was kicked out. He tells her he cannot marry her and heads to Pierce Greyson's (Tim Robards) island glamping retreat to make amends with Kyle. While there, he becomes suspicious of Finn's increasingly erratic behaviour. After learning that Harlow is missing on the island, Gary joins in the search and finds her and Bea Nilsson trapped in a mineshaft. He attempts to save them by throwing down a rope, but Finn fatally shoots him in the back with an arrow. Finn then drags his body away, and it is discovered by Elly while she is fleeing from Finn. Kyle is then forced to break the news to an equally devastated Sheila and Xanthe, and his funeral is held a week later.

== Reception ==
Sophie Dainty of Digital Spy branded Gary "troublesome". Bridget McManus of The Sydney Morning Herald thought Richardson was "underutilised" in the role. She also thought the plot in which Gary gets involved with Kev and the stolen car was reminiscent of the television crime series Underbelly. McManus later wrote that although Richardson was convincing as a detective in his former roles, he has "the sort of furtive look that lends itself much more comfortably to roles such as the slightly paranoid ex-con Gary." When Terese learnt she had breast cancer, a South Wales Echo observed "If you were battling a life-threatening illness, who would you turn to? Probably not Gary Canning or Paul Robinson, and yet the pair of them end up arguing over Terese's new treatment – what's more, Gary is devastated that Paul knew about her cancer diagnosis before he did. Maybe he should take a long look at himself and work out why."

The Metro's Katie Baillie expressed her sympathy for Gary when Terese cheated on him, commenting "the poor guy doesn't deserve this". Baillie added that Gary and Terese's relationship had been "rocky to say the least". Ahead of Gary and Terese's wedding, a reporter for the Liverpool Echo noted that "the path of true love has not been a smooth one for this blushing bride and groom, you can bet that tying the knot will turn out to be rather tumultuous." After the aborted ceremony, a South Wales Echo reporter sympathised with Gary and his revenge plan, commenting "After being lied to for months, it's understandable that Gary is feeling angry and hurt. Even Terese although annoyed by his efforts to take revenge in a very public fashion, has to admit that she's brought much of it on herself." In a fan poll run by Back to the Bay, Gary was voted the 57th most popular Neighbours character. A writer from the publication was critical of the character however, calling him "one of those annoying characters that you never seemed to be able to get rid of." The writer also added, "If he wasn’t coming up with some hairbrained scheme, he was punching well above his weight with the woman he pursued. So, when evil Finn Kelly finally took him out with an arrow, he went up a lot in our estimations."
