= List of Neighbours characters introduced in 2016 =

Neighbours is an Australian television soap opera. It was first broadcast on 18 March 1985 and currently airs on digital channel Eleven. The following is a list of characters that appeared in the soap in 2016, by order of first appearance. All characters are introduced by the show's executive producer Jason Herbison. The 32nd season of Neighbours began airing from 4 January 2016. Julie Quill and Xanthe Canning were introduced during the same month. March saw the first appearance of Jacka Hills. Jack Callahan, Ned Willis and Madison Robinson arrived in April, while Angus Beaumont-Hannay, Walter Mitchell and Mandy Franze made their debuts in May. August saw the arrival of James Udagawa, while brothers David and Leo Tanaka were introduced in September, along with Xanthe's mother Brooke Butler.

== Julie Quill ==
Julie Quill
- Neighbours character
- Portrayed by: Gail Easdale
- Duration: 2016, 2021
- First appearance: 12 January 2016
- Last appearance: 8 September 2021
- Introduced by: Jason Herbison
In-universe information
- Occupation: Businesswoman; Owner of Lassiter's Hotel
- Sons: Archie Quill; Jesse Porter
- Stepsons: Tom Quill
- Stepdaughters: Shay Daeng

Julie Quill, played by Gail Easdale, made her first screen appearance on 12 January 2016. The character and Easdale's casting was announced on 4 January. The actress revealed that she had previously auditioned for another role on the show in 2015, but was unsuccessful. She was then asked to play Julie and she accepted. The role marks Easdale's return to acting after a break to raise her children. She is also the wife of Stefan Dennis, who portrays Paul Robinson. Julie was introduced as the new owner of Lassiter's Hotel and Paul's enemy. Easdale described Julie as being "a hard nut, but she also has a softer side because she has worked hard and she appreciates others that put in the effort." Easdale said Julie was forced to make an impact in a male dominated environment, which she admired. She added that Paul was "a great character to play against", which made her guest stint more interesting as Dennis is different at home. The character is later exposed as the perpetrator behind the Lassiters Hotel explosion, which resulted in the deaths of Josh Willis (Harley Bonner) and Doug Willis (Terence Donovan) and she departs in June 2016. Easdale reprises the role on 8 September 2021, as Terese Willis (Rebekah Elmaloglou) visits Julie in prison in a bid to gain closure over the death of her son. Julie's return follows the introduction of her own son Jesse Porter (Cameron Robbie) in March 2021. Of her return and how Julie has changed, Easdale stated: "It's always great doing any role, but to be able to be Julie in the familiar surroundings of Erinsborough makes it that much more fun. Julie has reflected on her past deeds, making her a changed, remorseful character since the last time you saw her."

Julie comes to Erinsborough to inspect Lassiter's hotel, the Quill Group's newest acquisition. Julie holds a grudge against the hotel's previous owner Paul Robinson, following a failed romance between them. When she learns Paul's nephew Daniel (Tim Phillipps) has applied for a job at the hotel, she turns him down after an interview. Julie discusses her struggles as a woman in the hotel industry with Terese Willis, and she decides to hire Daniel after realising that he and Paul have fallen out. She tells Terese that if there are problems, she will be held responsible. Julie returns a few weeks later for a meeting with Terese, and she clashes with Paul again. She later reveals to Terese her plans for a second hotel tower to be built on existing businesses within the Lassiter's complex. Julie becomes determined to ruin Paul's bid to host the Erinsborough Citizen of the Year event. She manages to persuade the council to hold the launch party at The Waterhole, but Paul arranges a job offer for the Lassiter's chef, causing him to quit before the launch. Harold's Store does the catering and leaves Julie, the guests and Mayor Sonya Rebecchi (Eve Morey) with food poisoning. Robinson's Motel is awarded the ceremony.

Julie meets with her stepson Tom Quill (Kane Felsinger) to discuss the progress of the second tower. Tom informs Julie that he has persuaded those opposed to the development to withdraw their objections. When Robinson's loses its liquor license, Lassiter's regains the Citizen of the Year event and Julie gloats to Paul. She also puts pressure on Tom to sort the environmental report for the tower by replacing any negative report with a more positive version. When Tom's deception is later exposed, Julie disowns him. Shortly after, the boiler room at Lassiter's explodes, destroying the hotel. Julie moves in with Terese, who is grieving for her son Josh Willis, and learns that Tom is missing and possibly buried under the hotel rubble. She hires Sarah Beaumont (Nicola Charles) to take over Lassiter's while Terese takes leave. Julie attacks Paul as he is accused of causing the explosion, and when he tries to comfort her she accuses him of assault. Tom turns up alive, and Julie is angry with Aaron Brennan (Matt Wilson) for lying to her as he attacked Tom just before the explosion. Julie fires Terese when it transpires that she paid someone to give a false alibi, ensuring Paul was put away. At the reopening of Lassiter's, Julie is arrested by Mark Brennan (Scott McGregor), as John Doe's (Andrew James Morley) memory returns, and he recalls that he saw her conspire with Jacka Hills (Brad McMurray) to cause the explosion. Mark charges Julie and she attempts to apologise to Terese and her family. Terese's daughter, Piper Willis (Mavournee Hazel) slaps her and Terese refuses to forgive Julie. Mark then takes Julie away, and she is later sentenced to ten years in prison. Five years later, Julie's son Jesse Porter starts working for Lassiters in a bid to gain information for Shay, who is trying to repair the damage to the Quill Group's reputation.

== Xanthe Canning ==
Xanthe Canning, played by Lilly Van der Meer, made her first screen appearance on 22 January 2016. The character and casting was announced on 30 November 2015. Colette Mann, who plays Sheila Canning, teased Xanthe's introduction during an October 2015 interview. She commented that the new arrival would start "a big new storyline" for the family. Of Van der Meer's casting, Mann said "Lilly's world has certainly been opened up since joining the show and we're loving having her here. She was already a Canning after just a couple of weeks, we had converted her." Xanthe is Sheila's granddaughter, the half-sister of Kyle Canning (Chris Milligan), and daughter of Gary Canning (Damien Richardson). Van der Meer said Xanthe would make "a good friend" on Ramsay Street, and that she would get into "trouble, excitement, and mischief."

== Jacka Hills ==
Jacka Hills
- Neighbours character
- Portrayed by: Brad McMurray
- First appearance: 7 March 2016
- Last appearance: 13 October 2016
- Introduced by: Jason Herbison
In-universe information
- Mother: Maxine Cowper
- Wife: Regan Davis (until 2016)

Jackson Derek "Jacka" Hills, played by Brad McMurray, made his first screen appearance on 7 March 2016. Jacka is an old friend of Stephanie Scully (Carla Bonner). He was billed as the show's "newest villain" and a writer for the official website said with "trouble brewing", Jacka would be in the middle of it. McMurray enjoyed playing the role, saying "It's a great show to be a part of and I'm quite adept at playing the bad guy so this is really a lot of fun. I love causing trouble and there are definitely a few surprises in store where Jacka is concerned." Following his original guest stint, the character returned in September. Jacka asks Steph to visit him in prison, after learning that his wife Regan Davis (Sabeena Manalis) might be having an affair. Steph agrees to speak to Regan to find out the truth. In 2022, script producer Shane Isheev confirmed a planned return for Jacka, however the storyline was unable to be pursued due to the cancellation of Neighbours. The storyline would have seen Jacka meeting with David Tanaka (Takaya Honda) in prison and an earthquake causing a "mass prison breakout", leaving villains to "wreak havoc on the show." Isheev also called Jacka one of the serial's "iconic villains".

Steph Scully recognises her old friend Jacka, after he pulls his bike up alongside her and Mark Brennan (Scott McGregor). Steph suggests they round up their old friends for a beer and a talk. When Jacka mentions that they have been kicked out of their usual place, Steph invites them to Robinsons Motel. Paul Robinson (Stefan Dennis) voices his displeasure at having a gang of bikers at the motel and asks them to leave. Unhappy at the way Paul spoke to Steph, Jacka and the group return to trash the room and steal Paul's prosthetic leg. A few weeks later, Jacka leaves some boxes of alcohol at Robinsons for Steph. Mark Brennan recognises that they are stolen. Steph confronts Jacka and he warns her not to tell the police about his connection to the alcohol. However, Mark has already called it in. In retaliation, Jacka sprays graffiti over the motel's entrance. He is later seen leaving the scene of the explosion at Lassiter's Hotel with a cash box. Steph approaches Jacka to do some investigating into the explosion for her and Paul. Jacka refuses, as he is convinced Steph is trying to set him up. Jacka calls someone to let them know that no one knows he placed the hotel's blue prints in Paul's briefcase. Due to their gang connections, Jacka is revealed to be old friends with Ned Willis (Ben Hall). Jacka goes to Robinson's Motel where he wipes Paul's list of suspects from the whiteboard. Paul later contacts him about buying a fake passport to escape the country, in exchange for money. Jacks tells someone the phone that he will make sure the passport does not get Paul past immigration. Later, he is seen talking to the same person on the phone and laughing at Paul's prison sentence. It soon emerges that hotel owner Julie Quill (Gail Easedale) planned to pay him $10,000 to blow up the Lassiter's boiler to claim the insurance payout. Jacka did so, but Julie refused to pay him afterwards, once they found out that there were fatalities. Jacka is arrested and taken into police custody.

Months later, Jacka asks Steph to visit him. He believes his wife, Regan Davis, is having an affair and he wants Steph to find out who it was with. After speaking with Regan, Steph returns to the prison and tells Jacka that Regan thought they were having an affair before he was jailed, which is why she stopped visiting him. Steph explains that she set Regan straight and Regan will visit him soon. Jacka then reveals that he had someone else check up on Regan and he thinks Steph is lying. He tells her to get him a name. Regan later tells him that she was having an affair with Ned. Jacka is released early to care for his dying mother and he returns to Erinsborough to get revenge on Ned. He watches Ned with Elly Conway (Jodi Anasta) and later finds her at The Waterhole. He introduces himself to her as JD and buys her several drinks. Ned sees them together and pulls Elly away, telling her who Jacka really is. Terese Willis (Rebekah Elmaloglou) then asks for him to be removed. Steph confronts Jacka and urges him to give up his revenge plan. Jacka breaks into Number 32 and poisons Ned's tattoo ink. He breaks in again, and is almost caught by Brad Willis (Kip Gamblin) and Toadfish Rebecchi (Ryan Moloney). After learning that some of Ned's family and Elly are going up in a hot-air balloon, Jacka tampers with the gas cylinders, causing it to crash. At the hospital, Jacka learns that Regan died as a result of the balloon crash and he accuses Karl Kennedy (Alan Fletcher) of killing her. Jacka is then arrested, and he is later sentenced to eighteen years in prison.

== Jack Callahan ==
Jack Callahan (also John Doe), played by Andrew Morley, made his first screen appearance on 4 April 2016. The character and Morley's casting details were announced on 30 January 2016. Morley received a call from his manager asking him to record an audition tape while he was in Cambodia helping to raise money for charity. Upon his return to Melbourne, Morley was offered the role. He began filming in December 2015. Morley's character was initially billed as having "a mysterious past" and no family connection to Erinsborough. Morley commented that it was "an interesting start" for his character, dubbed John Doe. John befriends Paige Smith (Olympia Valance) as she tries to help him. It later emerges that his real name is Jack Callahan and he is a Catholic priest. Jack decides to stay in Erinsborough, but finds it hard as he is forced to choose between Paige and God.

== Ned Willis ==
Ned Willis, played by Ben Hall, made his first screen appearance on 6 April 2016. Hall's casting was announced on 11 March 2016, while the character has been referred to for several years following his off-screen birth. Following his initial guest stint, Hall later returned to filming and Ned returned on 10 August. Ned is the son of Brad Willis (Kip Gamblin) and Beth Brennan (Natalie Imbruglia). His introduction united all of Brad's children on-screen for the first time. Hall explained that Ned has been living with his grandparents in Darwin. Ned is a tattoo artist and Hall commented that it would lead to some "mischief". He also described Ned as being "very complex" and "quite manipulative", adding "he has had a bit to deal with and it's really interesting how his story line pans out." The character was reintroduced as a regular on 20 June 2018.

== Madison Robinson ==
Madison Robinson
- Neighbours character
- Portrayed by: Sarah Ellen
- First appearance: 22 April 2016
- Last appearance: 27 September 2016
- Introduced by: Jason Herbison
In-universe information
- Occupation: Journalism cadet; Personal assistant; Singer
- Family: Robinson/Ramsay
- Father: Scott Robinson
- Mother: Charlene Robinson
- Brothers: Daniel Robinson
- Uncles: Paul Robinson
- Aunts: Lucy Robinson
- First cousins: Amy Williams
- Other relatives: Jimmy Williams

Madison Robinson, played by Sarah Ellen, made her first screen appearance on 22 April 2016. Ellen's casting was announced on 20 February, while Madison has previously been mentioned by other characters following her off-screen birth in 1995. Ellen filmed her guest appearance in the same month, but producers have said that she could return on a more permanent basis in the future. Of the casting, series producer Jason Herbison said "we always knew the character of Madison would appear in the Neighbours universe at some point and I'm thrilled to have cast Sarah in the role." Madison returned on 24 June and remained until 27 September, departing during scenes filmed on the Gold Coast. Ellen received on-screen credit for flashback scenes featuring Madison on 10 October 2019.

Madison is the younger child of iconic Neighbours couple Scott (Jason Donovan) and Charlene Robinson (Kylie Minogue). She comes to Erinsborough to check up on her brother Daniel (Tim Phillipps), on behalf of their parents. To help her prepare for the role, Ellen watched footage of her on-screen parents. She commented, "I watched a lot of episodes with Charlene and she was a very feisty and adventurous character and I think Madison has definitely inherited a few of those characteristics." Madison is "a budding journalist". Holly Byrnes from the Herald Sun described her as a "stylish teen". On 22 August, Byrnes colleague Nui Te Koha reported that Ellen had wrapped her guest stint and would be pursuing new roles in Hollywood. Ellen commented, "Neighbours is such a great training ground. I feel like I could easily walk on to another set and it would be a breeze."

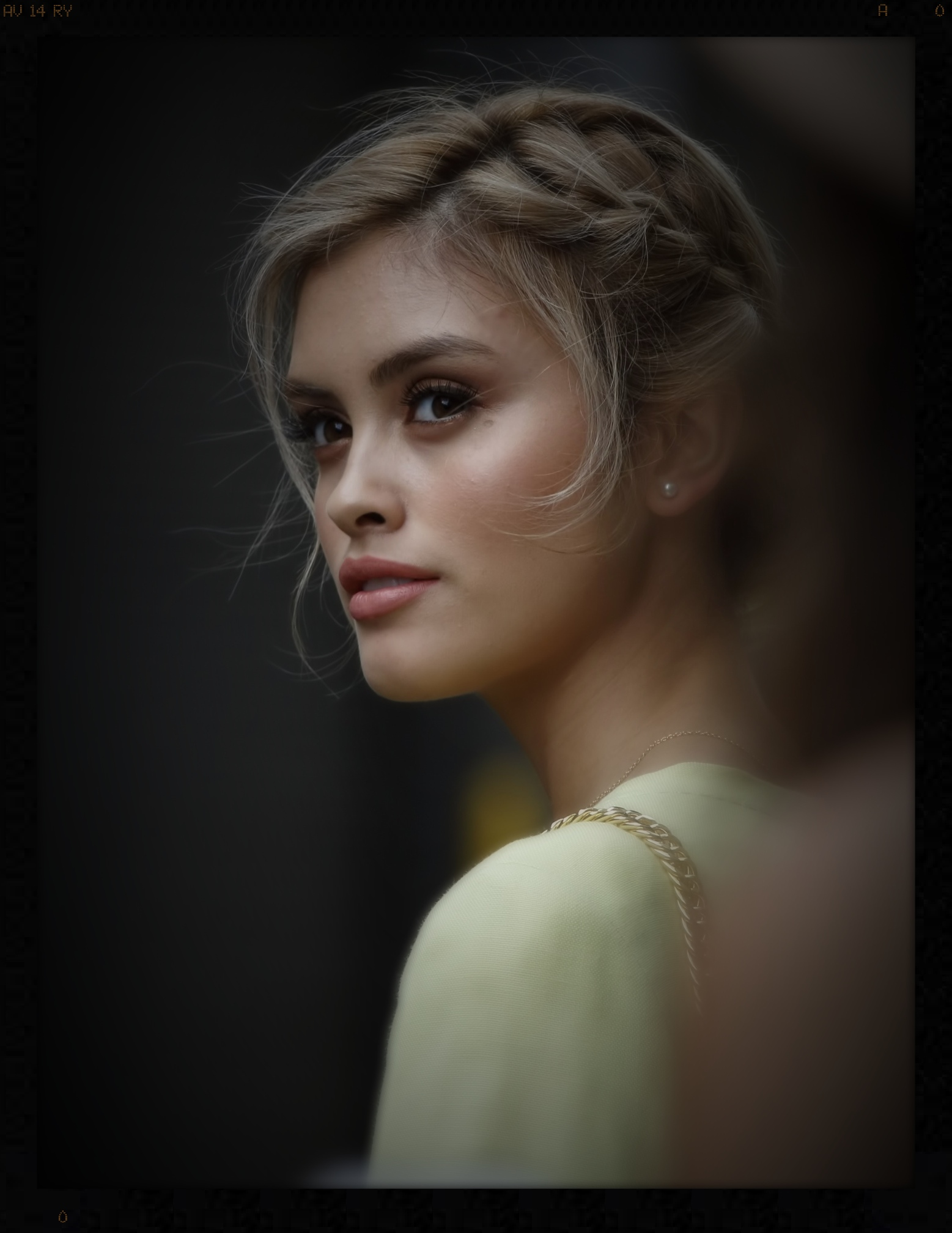
Sarah Ellen made her debut as Madison in April.

When no one answers the door of Number 24 Ramsay Street, Madison attempts to enter through an open window. When she is pulled down by her brother Daniel, she punches him. They get reacquainted with each other and Madison reveals that she has come down from Brisbane on behalf of their parents, following Daniel's announcement that he will marry Imogen Willis (Ariel Kaplan). Daniel tells Madison that he and Imogen are marrying so they can go to the United States. Madison lends some of her clothes to Daniel's neighbour Xanthe Canning (Lily Van der Meer). When she later enquires about Xanthe's photo shoot, Xanthe is disheartened by the pictures, but Madison tells her not to be. Daniel and Imogen's marriage license comes through and Daniel tells Madison that they will marry in secret the following day. When Imogen's parents learn about the wedding, they get Madison to tell them where it is happening. Daniel and Imogen are persuaded to hold the wedding at home in front of their family and friends. After they leave town, Madison decides to stay and speak to her uncle Paul Robinson (Stefan Dennis), who had been accused of causing the Lassiter's Hotel explosion. Madison tells Paul that she believes in him, as he had once taken her family out to dinner and told the waiter she was going to be the next Ita Buttrose. Madison explains that Paul is one of her heroes and she refuses to lose faith in him. After encouraging Paul to continue looking at the evidence, she leaves for Brisbane.

Paul is imprisoned for the explosion, but several months later, is found innocent when the police charge Julie Quill (Gail Easdale). When he is freed, Paul frames a trainee reporter for the West Waratah Star for writing a bad article about him and uses it to blackmail the editor into hiring Madison as a cadet at the paper. She takes the opportunity, flying to Erinsborough and abandoning a boyfriend and university plans. Paul urges Madison to write a feature about the locals, and he later alters some of the profiles so they become personal attacks. Paul's actions are soon discovered and Madison moves out of Paul's motel to live with Terese Willis (Rebekah Elmaloglou). As an apology, Paul tells Madison about another story involving the new cleaning company at Lassiter's, who used to employ ladies in lingerie. Madison discovers that her cousin Amy Williams (Zoe Cramond) worked for the company and tells her editor that she no longer wants to write the article. She is fired from the paper, so Terese hires Madison as her assistant. Madison encourages Terese to put in a bid for Lassiter's. When her aunt Lucy Robinson (Melissa Bell) accepts the offer, Madison flies to New York with her to oversee the paperwork on Terese's behalf. When singer Rhonda Riley (Shayne Francis) is late for her performance at The Waterhole, Madison is encouraged to take her place. Aaron Brennan (Matt Wilson) later arranges for her to perform again. Xanthe assumes Madison is dating Ben Kirk (Felix Mallard) when she sees them together, and her grandmother Sheila Canning (Colette Mann) fires Madison from The Waterhole. It soon emerges that Ben is working on a song for Xanthe with Madison's help. Madison receives an audition for a singing residency at Lassiter's Gold Coast courtesy of Lucy. At SeaWorld, Madison unexpectedly meets her former boyfriend Logan Dunne (Nick Slater), who she thought had gone to California. She confronts him about their break-up and learns that he did not receive her texts, as he threw his phone off a bridge. He also explains that he does not have a new girlfriend and that he still loves her. Madison is late to the audition, but impresses the judges is offered the job. She decides to give it up to accompany Logan to California, but he tells her that he will stay on the Gold Coast with her.

== Angus Beaumont-Hannay ==
Angus Beaumont-Hannay
- Neighbours character
- Portrayed by: Jai Waetford
- First appearance: 2 May 2016
- Last appearance: 30 November 2016
- Introduced by: Jason Herbison
In-universe information
- Occupation: Student
- Father: Peter Hannay
- Mother: Sarah Beaumont
- Sisters: Antigone Beaumont-Hannay

Angus Beaumont-Hannay, played by Jai Waetford, made his first screen appearance on 2 May 2016. Waetford's casting was announced on 10 February, but his character's identity was initially kept secret. He later revealed to Angus O'Loughlin of the Hit 30 radio show that his character was called Angus. Of his casting, Waetford said "I am super excited to be joining the Neighbours team. It's my first TV role and I am looking forward to spending time on set, learning new things and meeting new people." Waetford had a guest contract with the show. Waetford's character was initially billed as the "rebellious" son of "a controversial Erinsborough character." It was later revealed that Angus is Sarah Beaumont's (Nicola Charles) son. The show's series producer Jason Herbison commented that Waetford would have fun with his character, who pushes boundaries. Following Waetford's initial guest stint, he later returned to filming with the cast on the Gold Coast.

Angus comes to Australia after being expelled from his boarding school. He believes he is taking a holiday with his mother Sarah, but she tells him he is staying with her friends Karl (Alan Fletcher) and Susan Kennedy (Susan Kennedy) in Erinsborough while she goes to Germany for business. Angus clashes with Ben Kirk (Felix Mallard), after he finds and steals some money that Ben hid in his guitar case. Angus wants to leave, until he meets Xanthe Canning (Lily Van der Meer). Angus continues to feud with Ben, who later accuses him of planting matches and lighter fluid in his locker. Ben punches Angus in front of Xanthe and Susan. When Angus learns Xanthe has not prepared for an exam, he sets off the fire alarm. When Susan confronts him, he denies it was him. Angus buys Xanthe concert tickets and while sheltering from a storm, they kiss. When her friends fail to turn up for her 16th birthday party, Xanthe plans to make the day memorable by having sex with Angus. But after her grandmother Sheila (Colette Mann) stops them, Angus tells Xanthe that they are not right for each other and he ends their romance. Angus also tells Susan that he set off the fire alarm.

Angus also sprays graffiti on the wall at the high school, but is not punished, which angers Ben and they fight again. Angus overhears Ben asking Susan why he was allowed to get away with his bad behaviour and Angus asks Karl if he is his father. Karl assures Angus that he is not. Angus becomes involved when Tom Quill (Kane Felsinger) demands that Xanthe and Ben pay back the money they took from his hotel room. Aaron Brennan (Matt Wilson) helps them out with a clothes sale, while they also form a band so they can go busking. Angus learns from Xanthe that his mother has cancer, so he takes the money that Ben and Xanthe made busking and runs away. They find Angus at the Off-Air bar and he tells them he is going to Bali, but Ben takes his passport. Angus decides to hitch a ride to the airport and Xanthe goes with him, assuming that he has done it before. After becoming scared of the man who picked them up, Angus and Xanthe flee and her father, Gary Canning (Damien Richardson) takes them home. A few days later, Sarah returns to see Angus and apologises for not telling him about her cancer. She asks him to come to Germany with her, where she will continue her treatment. Angus asks if he can stay with Karl and Susan. However, after talking with his mother and realising that he did not cause her cancer, he agrees to go with her and they leave for Germany.

Weeks later, while he is on the Gold Coast with his father, Angus is reunited with Ben and Xanthe, after finding them on the beach. When he learns Madison Robinson (Sarah Ellen) is late for a singing audition, Angus fills in to by her more time. After speaking with Susan about how he has been affected by his mother's condition, she invites him to return to Erinsborough and he accepts. Susan's niece Elly Conway (Jodi Anasta) persuades Angus to return to school and he develops a crush on her. After Elly rejects Angus, he loses his virginity to Piper Willis (Mavournee Hazel), who also lost her virginity to him. He later decides to get a tattoo using Ned Willis's (Ben Hall) stolen ink, but Karl stops him as the ink is contaminated. Angus sings to Elly at the Halloween dance, rousing Susan's suspicions. That same night, Angus kisses Elly while she is sleeping and she reprimands him, but decides not to tell Susan. Leo Tanaka (Tim Kano) warns Angus to stop pursuing Elly. Angus decides to leave Erinsborough High, but he is persuaded to attend a music school instead. His drink is spiked by one of his new school friends and he makes a drunken phone call to Elly, who picks him up from the bar, with help from Tyler Brennan (Travis Burns). Aaron Brennan (Matt Wilson) informs Angus that an independent record label want to meet with him after seeing his music video. Elly plans to meet up with her former boyfriend and Angus asks Piper for her help in keeping them apart, but the plan fails and Elly asks Angus to stay out of her life. Angus helps a drunk Elly to bed and takes advantage of her state to kiss her. Susan finds him lying next to her on the bed and reports the incident to the education board, who refer the case to the police. At the same time, Angus is offered a record deal. Angus and Elly tell Mark Brennan (Scott McGregor) that nothing happened between them, but Elly later remembers what happened in her bedroom. Angus begs her to keep quiet, but she tells Susan and Angus is questioned by the police again, where he faces assault charges. Angus apologises to Elly and explains that he knows what he did was wrong. She decides not to press charges, and Angus's father escorts him to Sydney.

== Walter Mitchell ==
Walter Mitchell
- Neighbours character
- Portrayed by: Greg Stone
- First appearance: 13 May 2016
- Last appearance: 27 June 2016
- Introduced by: Jason Herbison
In-universe information
- Occupation: Musician
- Brothers: John Mitchell
- Wife: Roxanne (divorced)
- Daughters: Sonya Mitchell; Zoe Mitchell
- Granddaughters: Nell Rebecchi

Walter Mitchell, played by Greg Stone, made his first screen appearance on 13 May 2016. Walter was introduced as Sonya Rebecchi's (Eve Morey) estranged uncle. It soon emerged that Walter was hiding a secret from Sonya concerning the night her parents died in a car crash. He eventually revealed that he was actually Sonya's father. Furthermore, Sonya also learned Walter had a fourteen-year-old daughter called Zoe (Nicola Billie Gullotti). Sonya's half-sister suffers from leukaemia and Walter asks Sonya to get tested as Zoe needs a bone-marrow transplant. Daniel Kilkelly of Digital Spy branded Walter a "troubled relative", while an All About Soap columnist called him "cunning".

Walter arrives in Erinsborough, and Toadie tries to stop him meeting Sonya. Walter assures Toadie that he is three weeks sober, but he lent the money Toadie gave him to a friend instead of going to rehab. Toadie's friend Stephanie Scully (Carla Bonner) offers Walter a room at her motel. When Sonya arrives home early from a meeting, she meets Walter, but Toadie lies that Walter is one of his clients called Mitch. When she learns Mitch is an alcoholic, Sonya goes to an AA Meeting with him, where he meets Terese Willis (Rebekah Elmaloglou). Terese and Walter go for a drink and end up kissing. Sonya reveals that she has seen Mitch again, prompting Toadie to finally admit he is her uncle Walter. Sonya confronts Walter, who apologises for not finding her sooner, and though she tells him she cannot handle him in her life right now, he sticks around and continues to date Terese. Terese convinces Sonya to give Walter a second chance, but she becomes suspicious when she realises Walter was present in the car when her parents crashed and died. Walter reveals that he was arguing with his brother John, as he wanted Sonya to know he was actually her father, due to a brief affair between him and Sonya's mother.

Sonya is shocked and initially rejects Walter, prompting him to get drunk. When Sonya finds him, she agrees to help him get clean and invites him to move in. Walter breaks up with Terese and babysits Sonya's daughter Nell (Scarlett Anderson), impressing her, but she finds a text on his phone from his ex-wife Roxanne, urging him to be honest with Sonya about something. Walter admits that he has another daughter called Zoe, who has leukaemia. He asks Sonya to get tested to be a bone marrow donor. Sonya meets Zoe and gets tested, but they learn she is not a match. Walter then suggests that Nell could be a donor instead, and Sonya gets her tested in secret as Toadie objects. When she is found to be a match, Sonya tells Toadie, who refuses to let his daughter donate due to her young age. Walter collects Nell from nursery and takes her to the hospital. Realising what Walter has done, Zoe takes Nell back home. Walter apologises to Sonya and Toadie for kidnapping Nell, and Sonya decides not to press charges against him. When Sonya's son Callum (Morgan Baker) is found to be a match for Zoe, she and Walter leave for the United States. In 2018, Sonya learns that Zoe's cancer has returned and that chemotherapy is her only option left. Walter breaks his sobriety, so Sonya flies to the US to support him and he begins attending Alcoholics Anonymous meetings once more.

== Mandy Franze ==
Mandy Franze
- Neighbours character
- Portrayed by: Kristy Best
- First appearance: 26 May 2016
- Last appearance: 27 May 2016
- Introduced by: Jason Herbison

Mandy Franze, played by Kristy Best, made her first screen appearance on 26 May 2016. The character and Best's casting was announced on 1 May. Mandy is introduced as the "mysterious" former girlfriend of Andrew Morley's John Doe character, and a love rival for Paige Smith (Olympia Valance).

Mandy claims to be John Doe's girlfriend. She tells him that his real name is Jason Jones and that they live together. She had just got back from a trip when she learned where he was and what had happened to him. John questions Mandy about his life with her and she explains that they met in Geelong and that he is a handyman. Paige Smith is suspicious of Mandy, but John continues to get to know her and they kiss. Before John and Mandy leave town, Paige brings over a Hawaiian pizza for them. Mandy claims that it is John's favourite, as he loves pineapple, making him realise that she is lying about their relationship, as he is allergic to pineapple. Before she goes, Mandy reveals that she met John on the day of the Lassiter's explosion, but he did not tell her his name or many details about himself.

== James Udagawa ==
James Udagawa
- Neighbours character
- Portrayed by: Samuel David Humphrey
- Duration: 2016–2017
- First appearance: 3 August 2016
- Last appearance: 26 January 2017
- Introduced by: Jason Herbison
In-universe information
- Occupation: Businessman
- Stepfather: Hiroshi Udagawa
- Sisters: Jasmine Udagawa (step)
- Grandfathers: Toshiro Udagawa (step)

James Udagawa, played by Samuel David Humphrey, made his first screen appearance on 3 August 2016. The character and casting was announced on 25 July 2016. Humphrey, who has acrodysostosis, came to the attention of the casting directors after starring in a documentary about young people with physical disabilities. He was initially going to appear as an extra, but "a more substantial role" was later written for him. Of his casting, Humphrey stated "I love the whole process and I've learnt so much on Neighbours. I want to keep improving my skills and hopefully inspire other people to chase their dreams." James was billed as a "corporate whizz kid" and "highly-intelligent". He is brought in to help save Lassiter's Hotel from financial ruin and rein in Terese Willis (Rebekah Elmaloglou).

James joins Terese Willis in the lift at Lassiter's Hotel, where she mistakes him for a child due to his shortened height and directs him to the children's activity centre. When James later comes to Terese's office, she asks if he is lost and whether she can contact his parents. He then informs her that he is here to see her and the hotel's books, as he is a representative of his family's company, who have invested in the hotel. He explains that he wanted to experience the hotel as a guest and jokingly tells Terese that the children's activity centre is great. He asks to see the accounts, Terese's projections for the next year and the supplier contracts. A couple of weeks later, James returns for The Waterhole's quarterly review and to discuss the hidden cameras found in the hotel rooms. Elly Conway (Jodi Anasta) interrupts the meeting to explain that the cameras were part of a school media project and she apologises for it getting out of hand. James is satisfied with the explanation. Mr. Udagawa surprises Terese with his appearance a few weeks later. He lets her know that the figures for the Lassiter's pigeon race were satisfactory. Sheila Canning (Colette Mann) brings over a stock report for The Waterhole, which Udagawa takes from her. He tells Terese the takings are stagnant and demands to know what her plan is to improve them. James later confides in Terese that his sister Jasmine (Kaori Maeda-Judge) intends to usurp control of their family's company upon their grandfather's death. Jasmine manipulates their grandfather into relocating James, and he warns Terese to be careful around Jasmine.

== David Tanaka ==
David Tanaka, played by Takaya Honda, made his first screen appearance on 21 September 2016. The character and Honda's casting was announced on 22 August 2016, along with Tim Kano who plays David's twin brother Leo Tanaka. Of his casting, Honda said, "I feel so privileged to have the opportunity to join the regular cast of Neighbours. To learn from such prominent and longstanding Australian talent is truly seeing my dreams fulfilled." David and Leo come to Erinsborough in the hope of solving "a family mystery". David is a doctor, who has "a social conscience".

== Leo Tanaka ==
Leo Tanaka, played by Tim Kano, made his first screen appearance on 22 September 2016. The character and Kano's casting was announced on 22 August 2016, along with Takaya Honda who plays Leo's twin brother David Tanaka. Kano enjoyed portraying his character, saying "I'm loving the role of Leo, who is such a great character to play." The Tanaka brothers come to Erinsborough in the hope of solving "a family mystery". Unlike his doctor brother, Leo is an opportunist. Kano described the character as being superficial, "fun and cheeky". He also has "a good heart" and respects his brother.

== Brooke Butler ==
Brooke Butler
- Neighbours character
- Portrayed by: Fifi Box
- Duration: 2016–2017
- First appearance: 28 September 2016
- Last appearance: 26 May 2017
- Introduced by: Jason Herbison
In-universe information
- Occupation: Jewellery salesman Lassiter's Spa manager
- Husband: Gary Canning (divorced)
- Daughters: Xanthe Canning; Jesse

Brooke Butler, played by Fifi Box, made her first appearance on 28 September 2016. The character and Box's casting was announced on 18 July 2016. She began filming her first scenes during the same week. Reporters for the Herald Sun had previously confirmed that Box had auditioned for the serial on 15 July, after she was contacted by the casting director. Of her casting, Box commented: "I'm so excited to be heading to Ramsay Street to join the Neighbours family. Acting has been a lifelong dream of mine and to get this opportunity on Australia's most loved and popular show has blown my mind. I'm too excited for words!" Executive producer Jason Herbison praised Box's audition and said she won the role after showing that she "could pull off Gold Coast chic". Brooke is the estranged mother of Xanthe Canning (Lily Van der Meer) and ex-partner of Gary Canning (Damien Richardson). She was billed as "an opportunistic, flighty and dubious woman who relies on her looks to get by." Network Ten Executive Producer Claire Tonkin added that Brooke would be a "colourful character". In December 2016, Herbison confirmed that Brooke would return during 2017. She returned during the episode broadcast on 12 April.

Near their old Gold Coast apartment, Brooke sits in her car and watches her daughter Xanthe and Ben Kirk (Felix Mallard). Weeks later, Brooke comes to Erinsborough to reconnect with Xanthe. She is also reunited with her former partner Gary and meets his mother Sheila Canning (Colette Mann). Brooke apologises to Xanthe for leaving her for so long, but explains that she was being chased by several men that she had conned. Xanthe realises that Brooke has been in Perth with her half-sister Jessie the whole time. Brooke apologises for not being there for Xanthe. Brooke reveals that she has a business selling jewellery, but Sheila is suspicious of her timing, as the family have just won a cash prize on Family Feud. She later takes a pair of Brooke's sample earrings to get them valued, and when she learns that they are legitimate, Sheila apologises. Xanthe encourages her mother to host a jewellery party for their neighbours, where Brooke makes several sales. She later meets with Mack Sweetin (Brian Edmond), to whom she owes money, and asks for the jewellery order to be delayed, as she does not want the buyers to know they are getting fakes until she has convinced Xanthe to leave town with her. Ben sees Mack hand over the jewellery to Brooke, but she denies receiving the shipment. She then convinces Xanthe that Ben does not respect her, and the couple fall out.

Gary and Brooke reconcile their relationship, but Xanthe thinks Brooke is using her father. Gary confronts Brooke, but she convinces him that she has feelings for him. Mack warns Brooke that she is late with her repayment. Brooke manipulates Gary and Xanthe by saying Sheila is looking tired from looking after the house, working and caring for a teenager. She adds extra chilli powder to Sheila's meal, leading to her brief hospitalisation with indigestion. Karl Kennedy (Alan Fletcher) enquires about his jewellery order and Brooke lies that she has not received it yet. She later tells Gary that customs are holding the order and she has to pay a $2000 fee, so Gary lends her the money. Brooke arranges to take Xanthe to Perth for a holiday. Shortly before they leave, Brooke's former boyfriend Trey Johnson (Jason Buckley) turns up, demanding the money Brooke stole from him. Brooke repays him and he leaves. Brooke tells Xanthe, Gary and Sheila that she is in debt and that the jewellery is fake. Mack turns up to collect Brooke's latest repayment and Sheila pays him. She tells Brooke that she will organise some shifts at The Waterhole for her. However, Brooke later writes Xanthe a goodbye letter and leaves town. She later calls Xanthe, but hangs up without speaking to her.

Brooke returns to Erinsborough and applies for a job at the hospital, but Sheila ruins her chances. Brooke apologises to the Canning's neighbours for the jewellery scam and promises to pay them back when she gets a job. Terese gives Brooke a three-month trial as the manager of Lassiter's Day Spa. She also sets Brooke up on a date with Paul Robinson (Stefan Dennis). Brooke and Gary come up with a plan for Brooke to meet her daughter, Jesse, when she stops over in Melbourne on the way to Malaysia. When Terese sees Gary with Brooke, she thinks that Gary is cheating on her. Brooke and Gary wait outside a hotel where they think Jesse is staying, but Brooke receives a text message saying that she is at a different hotel. Brooke hopes to get back together with Gary, but when Gary and Terese become engaged, Brooke decides to leave for Malaysia to meet up with Jesse, after Sheila offers to pay her fare.

== Others ==
Date(s)	Character	Actor	Circumstances
4 January	Dr Lee	Marty Rhone	Dr Lee performs spinal surgery on Toadfish Rebecchi in order to remove a bullet lodged in his spine. The operation is interrupted by Toadie's wife Sonya, causing complications.
5–15 January	Warren Stacks	Michael Shanahan	Warren holds Paige Smith hostage and calls her Michelle, making her think that he was actually after Michelle Kim. Paige manages to free herself and hits Warren, before making her escape. He then accidentally strikes her with his car. Warren later meets up with Michelle and Dennis Dimato to explain why he took his mask off in front of Paige and then ran her over. Dimato is not satisfied with Warren's answers and tells Michelle he will deal with him.
7 January	Rochelle Neve	Carmen Warrington	Rochelle is Stanley Neve's wife, who had an affair with Lou Carpenter. She comes to Erinsborough to see Lou, believing that they will continue their relationship. However, Lou tries to trick her into thinking he is dating Sheila Canning, as he does not want a long-term relationship with Rochelle. She sees through his ruse and leaves.
15 January	Carla Watson	Gemma Bird Matheson	After the council receive a report about Bossy biting a child, Carla comes to interview Kyle and Sheila Canning. She issues them a fine for Bossy being unleashed in a public area and then impounds her, despite Kyle's protests that she is ill.
21 January–16 March, 30 May–6 June 2018	Philippa Hoyland	Wendy Bos	Philippa is Max Hoyland's third wife. During a video call, she tells Max's former wife Stephanie Scully that she wants to adopt Steph's son Charlie. An upset Steph asks Toadfish Rebecchi to talk to Philippa. A few weeks later, while Philippa is in Sydney on business, she notices Charlie is in Erinsborough. Philippa finds Charlie visiting Steph, and soon learns that it is not the first time. Lyn Scully explains that she previously brought Charlie down, without realising that it would be breaking the parenting order, while this time Charlie caught a train to see Steph again. Philippa accepts the explanations, but when she learns that Steph is going into business with Paul Robinson, the man who tried to drive her out of Erinsborough by messing with her medication, Philippa feels Steph's judgement cannot be trusted. She asks Steph to give her permission to adopt Charlie by signing away her parenting rights, but Steph rips up the letter. Philippa returns for a mediation meeting, but Steph's strange behaviour convinces Philippa that Charlie would be better off with her and Max. The next time they meet, Toadie explains that Steph was suffering from the heat and a lack of medication during their last session. Philippa brings in Lucas Fitzgerald as a witness, but she impeaches him when he says Steph is a good mother. After speaking with Max, Philippa tells Steph that the adoption is off and Charlie can visit again. Two years later, when Charlie returns to stay with Steph, he reveals that Philippa had an affair and that she forced him to keep it a secret from Max. Toadie tries to persuade Steph to use this to her advantage and gain custody of Charlie. He drafts a letter without Steph's permission and when his PA, Sheila Canning, accidentally sends it to Max, Philippa forces Charlie to leave Erinsborough with her. Philippa is later approached by Toadie's wife, Sonya Rebecchi, who convinces Philippa to give Steph another chance. Philippa calls Max and they agree to go to counselling, so she allows Charlie to stay with Steph and later move to Sydney with her.
27 January	Amanda Tucker	Jennifer Rose	Amanda is a Lassiter's beautician, who gives Karl Kennedy a manicure during his stay at the hotel.
2 February	Nigel Deme	Adam Dunning	Nigel is sent by the council to cut off the love locks on the bridge over Lassiter's Lake. Sonya Rebecchi and Karl Kennedy protest the removal of the locks and Nigel leaves. He later returns to close the bridge for being unsafe.
10 February	Lina Vella	Antonia Vekic	Lina is Tim Collins's mayoral campaign manager. She approaches Sonya Mitchell, Tim's rival, and asks her what will happen when the parents of her daughter find out she abandoned her son and suffered with addiction issues. Sonya cuts the conversation short and tells Lina not to come near her or family again.
15 February	Amanda Fowke	Hannah Cliff	Amanda conducts some survey work on behalf of the Quill Group and asks Imogen Willis if she can have access to the Rebecchi Law offices. After some boxes are delivered to the hotel, Amanda tells Daniel Robinson that the contents are valuable and that Julie Quill wants access to the store room prohibited.
15 February	Delivery Guy	Russell Leonard	The Delivery Guy brings some boxes to Lassiter's Hotel.
17 February	Trevor Lucas	David Rock	Trevor is a health inspector, who comes to assess the Erins Burrow motel. The co-owner Paul Robinson shows him into one of the rooms and explains that the other rooms are being fumigated. Trevor asks if the bedbugs have been dealt with and Doug Willis invites him to sit on the bed with him. Trevor declines and moves on.
18 February	Richard Pentecost	Akira Bradley	Richard is a journalist, who attends a public Q&A session between mayoral candidates Sonya Rebecchi and Tim Collins.
19 February–3 March, 28 February 2017	Noel Creighton	Kristian Beddow	Noel is a gender studies lecturer at Eden Hills University. His student Imogen Willis introduces Noel to Paige Smith, who sits in on their class. She initially struggles with the subject of intersectionality of gender, politics and the media, but Noel compliments her when she makes a good argument. Courtney Grixti later organises for Paige and Noel to go on a date, but nothing comes of it. Months later, Paige meets with Noal to discuss her potential transfer to a university on the Gold Coast.
22–24 February	Ainsley Gilzan	Emma Lucy Haughey	Ainsley buys a copy of a health class exam paper from Xanthe Canning. Ainsley is suspended for cheating on the exam and she tells Xanthe to make it right, as her friends, who were also suspended, blame her. Xanthe organises a party at Robinsons Motel for Ainsley, which is later broken up by Sheila Canning.
25 February–21 March	Aurora Green	Chloe Ng	Aurora joins in Paige Smith's protest against the removal of some trees to make way for a drainage project. When Sonya Rebecchi tells the protesters that she cannot stop the removal of the trees, Aurora tells Sonya to fix the problem or she will regret it. While planting shrubs with Paige, Aurora overhears Imogen Willis talking about relationships and tells her she might be polyamorous. Aurora later flirts with Daniel Robinson.
26 February–11 March	Cameron McPhee	Alexander Adams	Mark Brennan catches Cameron cutting flowers from the bushes outside Lassiter's Hotel, and soon realises that Cameron is also responsible for damaging several plants at Sonya's Nursery. Cameron admits that he did it for Paul Robinson, who wanted fresh flowers for his motel. Paul collects Cameron from the Erinsborough Police Station and when Cameron asks if he is going to fired, Paul tells him that he is a valued member of the team, but that he just needs to be more discreet if he is going to steal flowers from Lassiter's. Cameron later joins Brad Willis's outreach program.
1 March	Michael Arnold	Des Fleming	Michael is a mediator for a meeting between Stephanie Scully and Philippa Hoyland, who wants to adopt Steph's son. Michael and Philippa discuss a mutual associate and a law firm they worked for before the session begins.
1 March	Nursery Staff	Melissa Hill	Paul Robinson asks the garden nursery staff member to contact him if his grandson Jimmy Williams turns up.
3 March	Bernice Ashton	Rain Fuller	After Kyle Canning contacts the DHS about his sister Xanthe, Bernice comes to the hospital and determines that Xanthe needs to go into interim care while her grandmother is unable to look after her.
4 March	Juliet Worth	Lana Schwarcz	Juliet is Xanthe Canning's DHS caseworker. She meets with Kyle Canning and Amy Williams to discuss Xanthe's living arrangements while her grandmother, Sheila, is in hospital. Juliet asks Kyle why he called the DHS and he admits that he thought Xanthe caused Sheila's heart attack. Sheila arrives and tells Juliet that she is well enough to look after Xanthe, but Juliet replies that it is down to Xanthe to choose if she wants to stay.
9 March–22 July 2016, 31 May–28 June 2017	Tom Quill	Kane Felsinger	Tom is Quill's development manager. He buys a bottle of champagne for Mayor Sonya Rebecchi, but she declines it, so her executive assistant Aaron Brennan shares it with Tom, who tries to get him to talk about Sonya's feelings towards the new Lassiter's tower. Tom buys Aaron some shoes, but Aaron gives them back, along with a bottle of champagne, saying he does not accept bribes. Tom explains that he bought the shoes as an excuse to ask him out, but Aaron says he has a boyfriend. When Tyler Brennan accidentally flashes the patrons of The Waterhole, Tom asks Terese Willis to bar him. Tom and Aaron spend more time together and Tom takes advantage of the relationship by asking Aaron to send him the list of objectors to the second tower at Lassiter's. Tom talks them all into withdrawing their objections. Tom's step-mother Julie Quill puts pressure on him to make sure the environmental report is positive towards the tower. Tom gets Aaron to tell him who carried out the report, before uploading a doctored copy to his laptop. The council approve the tower, leading Aaron to realise Tom has used him. He records a confession from Tom, who is questioned by the police and disowned by Julie. Tom asks Paul Robinson to join him in destroying Lassiter's, but Paul refuses. Following the explosion at Lassiter's, Tom's ID badge is found in the wreckage. He is assumed to be dead, but he sends anonymous texts to Aaron blackmailing him. Aaron and Nate Kinski later find Tom at the complex and they report him to the police. He is interviewed over the explosion, but he has an alibi and is bailed. Tom believes Aaron has taken his money and demands it back. Tom receives a suspended sentence for the blackmail and is made manager of Lassiter's after Julie Quill is arrested. Tom returns the following year to oversee Paul's settlement from the Quill Group. He asks Aaron if he is interested in getting back together, but Aaron tells him he is interested in someone else. Tom meets with Paul's son and representative Leo Tanaka, who invites Tom to dinner with him and his brother David Tanaka.
11 March–25 May	Brodie Chaswick	Matt Testro	Brodie is Brad Willis's former swimming student. He comes to Erinsborough to apologise to Josh Willis for accusing him of using steroids and hurting his family. He then asks Brad if he will coach him again. Brodie also talks with Piper Willis and it emerges that they dated during their time in Canada. Terese Willis allows Brodie to stay at her house and he and Piper reunite in secret, until Josh catches them kissing. Terese and Brad also find out, but allow Brodie to stay with some conditions. Brodie under performs during training and Brad realises that he will not be good enough for trials. Brodie decides to leave Erinsborough, but Piper talks him out of it and they stay at Robinson's Motel. Brodie tries to turn Piper against her family and friends. He uses her phone to delete and send text messages to her family. Brodie convinces Piper to come to Perth with him. On their way out of town, Piper finds her phone in Brodie's hoodie top and confronts him. He locks her in the car and tries to convince her he has done it for her own good. Piper manages to text Tyler Brennan, who comes to pick her up. Brodie asks Terese for a job at Lassiter's, but she refuses and tells him to stay away from Piper and her family. Tyler also tells him to leave. However, Brodie later follows Tyler into the hotel's boiler room, shortly before an explosion destroys the hotel. Piper later texts Brodie, asking to see him. After being questioned by Piper, Brodie presents airline documents that provide him with an alibi.
24 March–2 August	Archie Quill	Harrison Mark	Archie accompanies his mother, Julie Quill, to The Waterhole. He overhears his half-brother Tom talking to an environmental planner and realises he has bribed him. Tom asks Archie what he wants for his silence. Archie later tells Julie that Tom has a plan when she voices her concerns about the upcoming environmental report on the second Lassiter's tower. Archie meets Charlie Hoyland and they spend time playing with a remote control car. They later get into a fight when Archie taunts Charlie about his mother's mental health problems. They claim that Charlie tried to use Archie's car without asking, but when Mark Brennan notices Archie alone in the complex, he questions him about the incident. Archie owns up to starting the fight and Julie apologises to Steph on his behalf. After Julie's arrest, Tom is left to look after Archie. He later leaves Archie with a relative, so he can continue his schooling. Archie teases Jimmy Williams about his mother's job as a lingerie-cleaner. When Charlie stands up to him, Archie and his friends lock Charlie in a dumpster. Archie denies seeing Charlie when questioned by Mark.
14 April	Alex Jones	Jana Wilkes	Alex comes to Erinsborough Hospital to tell Paige Smith that she is the real Alex Jones, not the John Doe in a coma. Alex explains that he carried her camping equipment and she gave him a Fitzgerald Motors card with her phone number on it.
5 May	Jackie Gore	Ana Mitsikas	After her daughter, Alison is slapped by Sheila Canning, Jackie meets with her for a mediation session. However, when Jackie insults Sheila's granddaughter, Xanthe, Sheila refuses to apologise and Jackie tells her they will meet again in court.
6 May	Steven Aniston	Garikai Jani	Steve notices a flyer asking if anyone knows John Doe and he gets in contact with Paige Smith. She and John Doe meet Steve at the garage, where he says he saw John before the explosion at Lassiter's Hotel. Steve explains that he and John started talking in a bar, but did not exchange names. John was supporting the Geelong Cats in the football match they were watching and he told Steve to check out Cunningham Pier.
11 May	Sharn Hauser	Juliette Salmon	As Sharn is walking past Ben Kirk, she calls him a loser and explains that Jayden Warley has just got off his good behaviour bond thanks to him. Ben tries to explain that Jayden falsified evidence during the school fire investigation, but Sharn insults him again and walks off.
11 May–2 November, 8 March 2017	Dustin Oliver	Kevin Clayette	Dustin meets John Doe and Paige Smith, after they find a picture of him and John together in Geelong. He calls John "Jay" as he greets him. However, before John and Paige can question him, Dustin sees Mark Brennan approaching and he runs off. Shortly after John is revealed to be Father Jack Callahan, Dustin comes to Erinsborough and apologises for running away. Paige spends time with Dustin, as they help out at a youth outreach programme, and they kiss, which Jack witnesses. Dustin realises that Jack has serious feelings for Paige and leaves. Paige later runs into Dustin and realises that he has been sleeping rough. Dustin reconciles with Jack and attends the outreach programme, where he begins boxing. Paige decides to get involved and spars with Dustin, who accidentally knocks her out. Weeks later, Dustin and Paige discuss her upcoming boxing match and he advises her to go through with it, after she suffers doubts. While catching up with Dustin, Paige tells him Jack's former girlfriend Simone Bader is in town, and he questions why women keep falling for Jack, as he is unobtainable. Dustin later goes back up north for family reasons. Jack invites Dustin back to town, so he can offer him a job at the new refuge centre. Dustin visits Paige and explains that the project does not sound like something he wants to be involved in, causing her to tell him to start taking some responsibility. Dustin texts Jack to say he will not be taking him up on the job offer.
17 May	Detective Chris Santini	Joel Pierce	Detective Santini informs Paul Robinson that someone has come forward saying they were hired by Paul to blow up Lassiter's Hotel. Santini refuses to name the person, but Paul suspects it was Cecilia Saint. Paul's daughter Amy Williams presses Santini for more information, and he explains that the witness claims that Paul sabotaged the boiler and then confessed everything to them. Santini cannot confirm if the witness will testify. Paul then admits to hiring Cecilia in the past, but reiterates that he did not cause the explosion.
30 May	Shandi Bouchard	Krystal Lencova	Shandi is a receptionist at the Rush Street Clinic. She tells Xanthe Canning that she will not have long to wait for her breast enlargement appointment. Shandi explains that Xanthe will love the new her, before pointing out that she had the same surgery and thinks it is the best thing she ever did.
30 May	Tess Land	Clare Pickering	Tess is a plastic surgeon, who prepares to operate on Xanthe Canning. Tess asks why Xanthe's mother is not with her and Xanthe explains that she is away in London. Xanthe later tells Tess that she no longer wants to go through with the surgery and Tess says she will lose her deposit. Xanthe's grandmother Sheila arrives and tells Tess that Xanthe fooled her with a fake email from her mother, before threatening to report Tess to the authorities.
6–7 June	Karen Harding	Wallis Murphy Munn	Karen is the prosecutor in Paul Robinson's trial for causing an explosion at Lassiter's Hotel. She instructs the witnesses not to talk about the case and that they tell the truth during proceedings. She then questions each witness on the stand.
6 June	Tipstave Alma Aboud	Arisha Bordbar	Alma asks Paul Robinson to stand to hear and answer the charges made against him.
6 June	Tipstave Roger Corr	Stanley Roach	Roger collects Stephanie Scully and Terese Willis from the court waiting room to give their evidence in Paul Robinson's trial.
7 June	Tipstave Sam Wise	James Ballard	Sam asks Paul Robinson to stand to hear the jury's verdict at the end of his trial, before instructing the jury foreman to read out the verdicts.
7 June	Foreman George Poulos	Andrew Pantelis	George is the foreman of the jury, who announces that they find Paul Robinson guilty of all charges.
9–13 June	Megan Cooper	Joanne Dobbin	John Doe notices Megan walking through the Lassiter's Complex and feels like he knows her. He fails to catch up to her, but later spots her entering a Braun & Bell Technologies company van. Paige Smith later meets with Megan and asks her how she knows John, but Megan admits that she never spoke with him and does not know who he is.
10 June	Graeme Lewis	James Romeril	John Doe goes to Braun & Bell Technologies to find Megan Cooper. He tells Graeme about his amnesia, but Graeme does not recognise him as one of their employees and says Megan has gone home for the day. Graeme tells John that the company is a franchise and it is possible he worked at one of the other sites, before explaining that they build and repair air conditioning and boilers.
14 June	Squeak McCain	Jesse Harris	Squeak is a prison inmate, who asks Paul Robinson for protection money. Just as Squeak and some of the other inmates are threatening Paul, Gary Canning intervenes and they walk away.
15 June	Stan Lewicki	Stephen Cook	Stan is another prison inmate, who gathers his crew to attack Paul Robinson.
17–27 June	Zoe Mitchell	Nicola Billie Gullotti	Zoe is Sonya Mitchell's fourteen year old half-sister. Their father Walter reveals that Zoe is dying from leukaemia and needs a bone marrow transplant. He brings Zoe to Erinsborough to meet Sonya and the sisters spend the day bonding. Sonya take a test to see if she is a bone marrow match for Zoe, but she is not. Zoe is briefly upset by the news. Walter decides that he and Zoe should return to Sydney, but Zoe falls ill and is hospitalised. When Walter brings his granddaughter Nell Rebecchi to the hospital, Zoe realises he has kidnapped her, as he knows Nell is a bone marrow match. Zoe takes Nell home to Sonya and Toadfish Rebecchi. When Sonya's son Callum is found to be a match for Zoe, she and Walter leave for the United States. In 2018, Zoe's cancer returns and she learns off-screen that a transplant will not be sufficient, leaving chemotherapy as her last option. Sonya flies to the States to support her and Walter, who begins drinking again.
20 June, 31 August	Father Peter McKinnon	Serge De Nardo	John Doe meets with Father McKinnon to get some advice about the flashbacks he has been suffering. John believes he may have caused the Lassiter's Hotel explosion and Father McKinnon urges him to go to the police. A couple of months later, after recovering from amnesia, Father Jack Callahan comes to Father McKinnon, to ask about a man who has admitted in confession that he is thinking of harming another person. Father McKinnon advises Jack to encourage the man to seek help. He also reminds him that the seal of the confessional is sacrosanct and to break it would mean automatic excommunication.
21 June	Danny Black	Chris Ostrenska	Danny picks Angus Beaumont-Hannay and Xanthe Canning up in his car. Danny stops at his place to invite his friend Rick to join them, but Angus and Xanthe run off. Danny and Rick almost catch up to them in the car, but Gary Canning arrives to take them home.
21 June	Rick Harrison	Christian Fazzari	Danny picks Angus Beaumont-Hannay and Xanthe Canning up in his car. Danny stops at his place to invite his friend Rick to join them, but Angus and Xanthe run off. Danny and Rick almost catch up to them in the car, but Gary Canning arrives to take them home.
24 June, 17 May 2017	Nathan Grundy	Joshua Monaghan	Nathan is a cadet for the West Waratah Star, who interviews Paul Robinson following his release from prison. Paul hacks into Nathan's article and changes it to make it sound defamatory. Nathan is later fired. The following year, Nathan questions Sonya Rebecchi about her losing the mayoralty and her alcoholism. Stephanie Scully threatens to call the police and Nathan backs off.
24 June–8 July	Penny Telford	Lisa Reynolds	Penny is an editor for the West Waratah Star, who meets with Paul Robinson to discuss the defamatory article about him. Paul tells Penny that he wants $50,000 in compensation, the cadet fired and his niece Madison Robinson to replace him. Penny agrees. After Madison writes an article about local people, which is turned into a character assassination by Paul, she expects to be fired. But Penny tells her she liked it and that she should run changes by her first. Penny later fires Madison, after she refuses to write an article about Ryan Prescott's lingerie-cleaning business.
24 June	Justyn Gutmann	Paul Herbert	Justyn notices Amy Williams in Harold's Café and asks where he knows her from. Amy tells him that he has probably just seen her around the neighbourhood and Justyn apologises for bothering her.
28 June–29 August	Ryan Prescott	James Sweeny	Ryan recognises Amy Williams in The Waterhole and calls her Anika, but she tells him he has got her confused with someone else. It emerges that Amy used to work for Ryan's lingerie-cleaning business. He asks her to come back, but she refuses. Tom Quill offers Ryan the cleaning contract at Lassiter's Hotel, provided he does not harass Amy further. Ryan flirts with Terese Willis and they go on a few dates. Terese later hires a private investigator to look into Ryan's background and Madison Robinson warns Ryan that his past is about to be exposed by the press. Terese fires Ryan and he later plants several cameras around Lassiter's to film the guests. He also pays Gregory Jenkins to date Amy and bring her back to the hotel. Amy meets with Ryan when she learns he has a copy of the camera footage and pretends to be interested in blackmailing Terese. Ryan then catches her trying to steal the hard drive and she leaves empty handed. Terese later meets with Ryan and buys the hard drive from him. She then has his car towed. Three years later, when it is discovered that one of Ryan's hidden cameras had been filming a hotel room since 2016, Terese confesses to the police and Ryan is arrested off-screen.
30 June	Brinsley Belden	Jack Green	Brinsley asks Xanthe Canning to the formal. She points out that they have never spoken to each other before. Brinsley says that her grandmother, Sheila Canning, told him she had no one to go with. Sheila tells Xanthe that Brinsley is from a good family, but Xanthe does not want to use him.
1 July	Scott Gaensler	Elias Anton	Scott is a member of Brad Willis's Blaze Outreach program, who attends a gym session at the Erinsborough Community Centre. Brad introduces Madison Robinson to Scott and explains that he is homeless and sleeps at some of the local shelters, as he cannot do so at the centre. Scott and some of the other Blaze Outreach members later graffiti the outside of the Community Centre.
14 July	Lionel Brown	Guy May	Piper Willis brings Lionel to Harold's Café to fix her laptop. While he sits down, Piper tells her mother Terese Willis that Lionel is her date to the formal. Terese tells Lionel to stay away from her daughter and he leaves.
18 July–31 August	Cooper Knights	Charlie Hannaford	Cooper and Alison Gore spike the punch at the Erinsborough High formal. Alison remarks to Cooper that she does not understand what Ben Kirk sees in Xanthe Canning, but Cooper replies that he does. Cooper later spends the day with Xanthe at Harold's Café. While they are filming a school project at Lassiter's Hotel, Cooper tries to kiss Xanthe and refuses to let her leave, before assaulting her. Cooper threatens Xanthe after she quits their film group. Xanthe tells Elly Conway about the incident, which is investigated by the police. Cooper is later attacked and suffers a head injury. He tells the police that he was attacked from behind. He returns to school and taunts Xanthe about no one believing her allegations. Her father, Gary Canning, later threatens Cooper, as he is boasting to his friends. Camera footage from the night of the assault proves Xanthe's allegations and Cooper comes to apologise to Xanthe. Ben and Tyler Brennan later find him over overexerting himself on the outdoor gym equipment, and get him to admit that his mother caused his injury. Cooper tells Susan Kennedy that he is sorry for what he did to Xanthe and that his mother has hurt him more than once. He is cautioned and sent on a course for assault offenders.
21 July–17 August	Clive West	David Bradshaw	Clive deliberately drives his car into a bike path damaging several bicycles. Mark Brennan finds Clive at The Waterhole and informs him that he will be charged. Mayor Sonya Rebecchi tries to reach out to Clive, having learnt that he lost his wife and daughter in a traffic accident caused by a cyclist. However, Clive refuses to listen when Sonya suggests a meeting about the proposed cycle lanes. He tells her she will regret crossing him and he goes to the press to accuse Sonya of intimidation. Clive continues to protest the building of the bike lanes. When he spots Charlie Hoyland looking around his vehicle, Clive scares Charlie. Brennan questions Clive about the incident and then spots a brick in the trailer, which is similar to the one thrown through the Rebecchi Law office window. Clive admits to throwing the brick, but denies releasing snakes onto Ramsay Street when questioned further.
22 July 2016, 26 April–27 August 2018, 3 March 2020–25 May 2022	John Wong	Harry Tseng	A private investigator hired by Terese Willis to investigate Ryan Prescott. Paul Robinson later pays John to send everything he found out about Ryan's lingerie cleaning business to the West Waratah Star. Two years later, Leo Tanaka hires John to look into Mishti Sharma's friend Monique Hughes. John cannot find anything on Monique, but learns that Mishti's deceased fiancé, Zander Mellas, was being investigated for corruption. Leo later tells John that he no longer requires his services. John begins following Xanthe Canning around town. Xanthe's father Gary Canning confronts John, who reveals that he has been observing her on behalf of their insurance company. Toadfish Rebecchi asks John to find a Peter Wilson, but cannot provide much detail beyond a hospital visit in the 1970s. John tells him it will take some time. John is hired by Aaron Brennan and David Tanaka to help them find Brent Colefax, who has gone missing. John finds Brent and takes him to Aaron and David, before wishing them good luck. When Nicolette Stone, who is carrying Aaron and David's baby, runs away, Paul hires John to find her. John tells Paul that he has been tracking Audrey Hamilton as per his instruction, and he presents Paul with a photo of Nicolette and Audrey in Canberra. When Paul has learned that Jane Harris has hired John to find Nicolette, he asks John to drop the case, then explains that he paid Nicolette to stay away. Paul says that he has been a good-paying client of John's and requests that John does his job badly as a favour. John asks if he is sure and Paul gives a nod of affirmation. Months later, John gives Harlow Robinson a file containing information on Glen Donnelly. When Glen finds out, he asks John to keep the information from Harlow because it will ruin people's lives, which John agrees to do. Months later, Paul asks John to investigate designer Montana Marcel, telling him that he has fears for his son and his own money. Paul demands that he gets some answers that day. Glen notices John and Paul together, and asks John whether their conversation was to do with his daughter, but John says Paul is worried about something else. John gives his findings to Paul, who learns Montana is facing financial difficulties.
26 July–1 August 2016, 27–28 July 2022	Annie Robinson-Pappas	Gracie Helen Vine; Harlow Ireland	Annie is Lucy Robinson and Chris Pappas' daughter. Lucy brings Annie from New York to Erinsborough with her, while she oversees the sale of Lassiter's. Six years later, Annie visits Erinsborough with her parents and has brunch with her family. When Annie learns that Paul Robinson, David Tanaka, Leo Tanaka and Aaron Brennan may be moving to New York, she tells David and Leo that she would enjoy having more cousins living near her. She also meets Glen Donnelly and Terese Willis. Annie goes to Toadie Rebecchi and Melanie Pearson's wedding with her parents a few days later and goes to their reception party on Ramsay Street, where she befriends Toadie's daughter, Nell, plays cricket and meets Shane Ramsay.
26 July	Pete Howard	Simon Barbaro	Pete comes to The Handywoman and enquires after Jimmy Williams's health, before asking Amy Williams about a garden arch she is putting together for him.
27 July 2016 – 18 February 2020	Clementine	Harry; Uncredited	A cat that lives in the house behind 26 Ramsay Street. It wonders off when its owner moves into a nursing home, but is found by Piper Willis at Erinsborough High and Piper gives it some food. Piper finds the cat's presence comforting when she feels lonely. Piper names the cat Clementine, after Clementine Ford, and it chases off a snake that has kept Xanthe Canning trapped in a shed. Piper's mother Terese Willis allows her to keep Clementine, and she later confides in her about her breast cancer diagnosis. Paul Robinson takes Clementine to Number 26 and puts her in with some racing pigeons ahead of a race to promote Lassiter's the following day. Clementine kills two of the birds. She is later poisoned by Adrian Snyder and found by Xanthe and Ben Kirk, who rush her to a vet. Hendrix Greyson befriends Clem after moving into Ramsay Street. When he moves to Number 28, Harlow Robinson, who is allergic to cats, brings Clem over, as Terese said that Hendrix can have her. Following the birth of Elly Conway's daughter, Susan Kennedy tells Hendrix that Clem has to go. Hendrix continues to spend time with Clem, until Harlow accidentally strikes and kills her with a car.
2 August–5 September 2017	Emily Newman	Marita Wilcox	Mrs Newman spends the day with Father Jack Callahan discussing various church matters. She later asks Father Callahan about the celebrations for the Feast of the Immaculate Conception and he assures her that he is about to start planning it. The following year, Mrs Newman bonds with Xanthe Canning, who is on work experience at the hospital. David Tanaka diagnoses Mrs Newman with potential hyperthyroidism. Father Callahan reveals that he is going to be a father, and Emily leaves a public event that he has organised with the cakes she has baked.
3–4 August	Gregory Jenkins	Kevin Kiernan-Molloy	After seeing Amy Williams in the paper, Gregory buys her flowers and asks her to meet him in The Waterhole for a drink. Amy agrees to stay for one drink, but enjoys Greg's company and agrees to go back to his hotel room. They kiss before Amy leaves, unaware that Greg was recording them with a hidden camera. The following morning, he offers a drunken Elly Conway a drink of water in his room.
5 August–14 September	Ari Philcox	Dylan Watson	Ari is an exterminator hired to look for a brown snake in Ramsay Street. He tells Mark Brennan that it is unusual for that type of snake to be in the area. Ari leaves after failing to find the snake, telling the Rebecchis to call him if they see it again. Ari is later called back to Ramsay Street to collect a different snake. It is then revealed that he has been releasing them and he confesses to Jack Callahan that he is getting revenge on someone in the street who should not be with the woman he loves. It soon emerges Ari's target is Stephanie Scully, as she was in a relationship with Belinda Bell, who he loves. Ari continues to stalk Steph and enters her home, but is scared off. Belinda meets with Ari, but Steph's son Charlie Hoyland also turns up. Belinda tries to calm Ari down, but he notices Charlie texting for help and produces a knife. As Ari is forcing Belinda and Charlie into his car boot, Mark tackles him and is stabbed. Ari is arrested, but he escapes on the way to the psychiatric hospital. He kidnaps Steph and takes her to Blaze Outreach, where he releases a snake. Jack interrupts and the snake bites Ari. Jack treats him, as Mark releases Steph. At the hospital, Ari apologises to Steph.
9–11 August	Poppy Jarvis	Tayla Bozelle	While Poppy's mother is in hospital, Father Jack Callahan offers to take care of her. When the Ramsay Street residents learn that she has cystic fibrosis and has been bullied, they organise a superhero-themed treasure hunt to cheer her up.
11 August	Felix Laing	Billy Doyle	Felix sees Poppy Jarvis with a remote controlled car and he snatches the controls away, telling her she will not be able to drive it. Karl Kennedy takes the controls back and tells Felix to leave.
12 August	Solomon Canter	Adam Ward	Solomon is a Michelin star chef, who is flown over to Australia by Terese Willis, as she wants him to take over running the kitchens at Lassiter's Hotel. However, Solomon later accepts a job running the new restaurant at Robinsons Motel.
17 August	Tugg Nelson	Kaden Hartcher	Tugg is drinking in The Waterhole when he recognises Ned Willis. They greet each other and Tugg offers to round up some of their friends for a get-together, but Ned tells him not to.
23 August–4 November	Maureen Knights	Judith Chaplin	Maureen is Cooper Knights' mother and a surgeon at the hospital. After learning Xanthe Canning has accused Cooper of assaulting her, Maureen comes to see her family and Gary Canning asks her to leave. Maureen approaches Karl Kennedy outside the hospital to ask about the Canning family and his wife Susan's handling of the situation. Maureen later tells Karl that Cooper has been admitted to hospital, after she found him with a head injury following an attack. Karl questions Maureen further about Cooper's history of concussions and whether he is clashing with a family member, which causes her to react angrily and walk off. After Cooper tells the police that Maureen caused his head injury, Karl leads her to a waiting police car. Maureen admits that she gets angry and did not mean to hurt her son, but Karl replies that there is no excuse. A few months later, Karl meets with to ask her about Nurse Eve Fisher, as he believes she is after revenge for the part he played in Maureen's job loss. Maureen later speaks with Eve and tells her to stick to the facts during an upcoming coroners hearing.
25 August	Rhonda Riley	Shayne Francis	Rhonda is hired to sing at The Waterhole, but Paul Robinson comes to her hotel room and asks her to sign an exclusive contract to sing at his new restaurant instead. He makes sure she is delayed for her gig at The Waterhole. When Rhonda sees Madison Robinson singing on stage, she tells Paul that she will not sing at his restaurant and leaves.
2 September–21 October	Bree Wozniak	Kate Boladian	Ned Willis notices Bree at Harold's Café and she tells him she is in town visiting a mutual friend. She asks him about Elly Conway and he tells her they are just friends. Bree sees Ned and Elly kissing, and tells him that his former girlfriend, Regan Davis, wants to see him. Ned later talks to Bree when someone tells Regan's husband Jacka Hills that she is having affair. Bree insists it was not her. Ned says that Jacka cannot know that he was the one seeing Regan. Bree replies that Regan is not good under pressure and that she has gone to visit Jacka. Weeks later, Bree attends Regan's memorial service following her death. When she sees Elly, Bree confronts her and Steph pulls her away.
5 September–13 October 2016, 1 January 2019–15 October 2020	Constable Miles Doughty	Lee Ton	A police constable, who discusses potential suspects targeting Stephanie Scully with Mark Brennan. He suggests that Miles should contact Belinda Bell. Miles then says that Mark was spotted outside the church that morning, but Mark manages to pass it off. Weeks later, Jimmy Williams gives a statement to Miles, as he believes he caused Stephanie Scully's bike accident with his drone. Miles tells him that Steph came off her bike due to an old muffler. He thanks Jimmy for coming forward and tells him to be more careful with his drone. Three years later, Miles comes to Erinsborough Hospital to question Gary Canning about his attack on Dipi Rebecchi. Gary tells Miles that it was an accident, and after Miles visits Dipi, he tells Gary that they will not be pursuing the matter further. A couple of months later, Miles reads Finn Kelly his charges, including fraud, theft, false imprisonment, and attempted murder. Following a hit-and-run at the hospital, in which Finn is injured, Miles tells Mark that they found the car, which was stolen from the hospital, and that the owner is not a suspect. Miles brings a box into the Erinsborough Police Station that is labelled with Scarlett Brady's name. An inspector rings the phone and asks Miles to go check on something. As he walks off, Shane Rebecchi opens the box, but is caught by Levi Canning.
5 September	Wilbur Jessup	Chris Gaffney	Wilbur is the senior ranger at a local animal sanctuary. Mark Brennan asks him about local licensed snake handlers and Wilbur suggests he talk to Ari Philcox. Mark has to leave suddenly, but when he returns to talk to Ari, Wilbur tells him Ari has gone and has taken all his snakes too.
6 September	Leny Ormond	Troy Cowards	Leny is Angelina Jackson's manager, who meets with Aaron and Tyler Brennan to discuss her upcoming fight with Paige Smith. When Aaron enquires about cancelling the fight, Leny tells him that he will need paying $12,000.
7–23 September	Angelina Jackson	Sarah Howett	Angelina is Paige Smith's boxing opponent. She watches Paige train and asks if their fight is still on. When Paige says it is, Angelina tells her that her last opponent ended up in critical condition. During the fight, Angelina gets the upper hand, until Paige knocks her out in the second round. Angelina suffers a brain haemorrhage and is placed in a coma. Doctors also find that she has a brain tumour. Angelina undergoes surgery to remove the tumour, which is successful.
9 September	Buttercup	Uncredited	Two racing pigeons that Gary Canning takes in after their previous owner moves into a nursing home. Karl Kennedy and Toadie Rebecchi agree to buy one each for a pigeon race at Lassiter's Hotel, however Paul Robinson releases Clementine the cat into their cage. Buttercup and Snowflake are killed and Sheila Canning cooks them in a pie.
9 September	Snowflake	Uncredited	Two racing pigeons that Gary Canning takes in after their previous owner moves into a nursing home. Karl Kennedy and Toadie Rebecchi agree to buy one each for a pigeon race at Lassiter's Hotel, however Paul Robinson releases Clementine the cat into their cage. Buttercup and Snowflake are killed and Sheila Canning cooks them in a pie.
12 September–12 October	Regan Davis	Sabeena Manalis	Regan comes to Erinsborough to see her former boyfriend Ned Willis after learning he is dating someone new. Ned tells her that it does not matter, as she is married and was not honest with him. Regan kisses Ned and then hugs him goodbye, which Mark Brennan witnesses. Regan comes to The Waterhole to talk to Ned, and his girlfriend Elly Conway tells her to leave him alone. It soon emerges that Regan is married to Jacka Hills. Stephanie Scully asks Regan if she is having an affair and Regan confirms that she was. They agree to keep it from Jacka, but when Regan visits him in prison she tells him about Ned. Jacka is released, and Ned asks Regan to give the police a statement that will put him back in prison, but she refuses. She asks Ned to keep her safe, before suggesting they start a new life together. Ned takes her out of town, but Regan returns to warn him about Jacka, who believes they are back together. Regan thinks Elly should speak to Jacka, and when Steph mentions Elly is about to go up in a hot air balloon, Regan leaves to find her. Regan is mistaken for an extra passenger and she manages to hide from Elly, until the balloon is in the air. She then asks Elly for her help in convincing Jacka that she is not with Ned, but Elly refuses. The burner goes out and the balloon crashes, leaving Regan with a serious head injury. Karl Kennedy is forced to drill into her skull to relieve the pressure. At the hospital, Regan undergoes surgery, but dies shortly after.
15 September	Carmen Ciabarra	Cecilia Low	Carmen is Paige Smith's boxing coach. She gives Paige advice about her opponent.
15 September	Gus Howard	Steve Hayden	Gus acts as the referee for the boxing match between Angelina Jackson and Paige Smith.
15 September	Blake Dyson	Thomas Petrakos	Blake is Angelina Jackson's trainer. He comes to Aaron Brennan and tells him that he has to cover Angelina's loss of earnings.
16–21 September	Rena Jackson	Kelly Nash	Rena is Angelina Jackson's mother. As she is coming out of Angelina's hospital room, she sees Paige Smith, her daughter's boxing opponent, and asks Karl Kennedy to tell her to leave. Rena later tells Lauren that she blames Angelina's trainer for her condition, as he pushed her into the fight. Paige persuades Rena to let Dr Adisa operate on Angelina.
22 September	Dr Anward Adisa	Yasmin Bushby	Dr Adisa is a neurosurgeon, who Karl Kennedy introduces to Rena Jackson. Dr Adisa advises Rena about the surgery she could perform on her daughter's brain tumour. Dr Adisa says she will be around until the weekend, while the family makes a decision about the surgery.
22–30 September	Nikki Jackson	Tiarnie Coupland	Nikki is Angelina Jackson's younger sister. She accuses Paige Smith of trying to pressure her mother, Rena Jackson, into allowing Angelina to undergo surgery because she feels bad. When Rena agrees to the surgery, Nikki calls her weak and tells Paige she will be sorry for interfering. Nikki finds Paige at Blaze Outreach and tries to fight her. Paige tells Nikki about her brother's death and they hug. Father Jack Callahan arrives and demands to know if Paige is okay. Nikki thinks that Jack has feelings for Paige. Angelina's surgery goes well and Nikki returns to the hospital to be with her. Jack invites Nikki to attend Blaze Outreach, despite her negative views about the church and priests. When Nikki catches Jack looking at a topless Paige, she accuses him of being sleazy and leaves.
26–27 September	Logan Dunne	Nick Slater	Logan is Madison Robinson's former boyfriend. While she is in the Gold Coast, Madison sees Logan emerging from the dolphin pool at SeaWorld. He tells her he is doing an internship there, after he failed to get a transfer to California. Madison confronts Logan about their falling out. He explains that he could not return her texts, as he threw his phone over the Storey Bridge, and that the girl in his Instagram photos is just a friend. Logan tells Madison that he loves her and that he wants her to come to California with him, as someone dropped out of the study program. However, when he learns Madison is willing to give up an opportunity to sing at Lassiter's Hotel for him, he realises that he cannot let her and decides to stay on the Gold Coast.
27 September	Clara Winter	Emma Louise Pursey	Clara and Peter are members of a panel, who are auditioning to be singers for Lassiter's Gold Coast. Angus Beaumont-Hannay claims he is Madison Robinson and performs for the judges. Madison arrives and they let her audition. At the end of her performance, Clara asks her what she is doing for the next few months and Peter tells her to pack her bags, as she is moving to the Gold Coast.
27 September	Ken Giles	Peter Rossi	Clara and Peter are members of a panel, who are auditioning to be singers for Lassiter's Gold Coast. Angus Beaumont-Hannay claims he is Madison Robinson and performs for the judges. Madison arrives and they let her audition. At the end of her performance, Clara asks her what she is doing for the next few months and Peter tells her to pack her bags, as she is moving to the Gold Coast.
5 October	Rick Haezlewood	Ben Rose	Paul Robinson contacts Rick to ask him to dig up information on Leo Tanaka. A few hours later, Rick brings Paul the information, which contains a press clipping. Rick explains that Leo was the manager of a nightclub that was linked to money laundering.
6–17 October	Diana McLaughlin	Tilly Legge	Diana interviews the Canning family and Amy Williams for a chance to appear on Family Feud. She later helps them on the day of filming.
11 October	Mike Niven	Lyall Brooks	Mike operates the hot-air balloon for Lauren Turner's hen party. He takes the consent forms and calls his head office to see if there is anyone on the waiting list to take the spare place. When Regan Davis arrives, Mike assumes she is the extra passenger and tells her to get in the balloon. During the ride, the burner goes out and Mike assures the women that everything is okay and he will change the fuel cylinders. Mike realises the fuel is not feeding through and tries a further cylinder, but the burner does not relight. Mike tells the women to assume the brace position on the floor, as the balloon crashes. Mike survives the crash and suffers minor injuries.
12 October–4 November	Nurse Eve Fisher	Abbe Holmes	Toadfish Rebecchi asks Nurse Fisher about Stephanie Scully, who in a bike accident. She tells him that the doctor is with her and she cannot tell him anything else. When victims of a hot-air balloon crash arrive, Karl Kennedy informs Nurse Fisher that he used a drill to relieve the pressure of Regan Davis's head injury. Nurse Fisher asks him if he is okay and suggests that he should go home. She also gives Mark Brennan an update on Elly Conway's condition. When Karl asks her if there is any news on Regan, Nurse Fisher informs him that Regan died. She then reports Karl for malpractice, after smelling alcohol on his breath. She later catches David Tanaka look through personnel files, but he claims to be looking for patient files as he is new. When he asks about the coroner's hearing, Nurse Fisher tells him that she plans on telling the coroner about Karl's mistakes, and that David should be careful about who he wants in his corner. Karl is exonerated when former Erinsborough doctor and Eve's friend Maureen Knights asks her to stick to the facts in the hearing.
17 October	Diana McLaughlin	Tilly Legge	Diana escorts Gary Canning, Sheila Canning, Xanthe Canning and Amy Williams to their Family Feud game.
17 October–11 November	Simone Bader	Kahli Williams	Paige Smith comes across Simone in the local church presbytery, and Simone introduces herself as a friend of Jack Callahan. She later tells Paige that she was Jack's childhood sweetheart. Jack admits to Simone that he broke his vows and had sex with Paige. Simone urges Jack to seriously think about whether he wants to give up the priesthood for Paige. Simone attempts to steal Amy Williams's ute, but she is caught by Mark Brennan. Jack pleads for leniency on Simone's behalf, and Mark offers to talk to Amy about dropping the charges. Simone goes to Paige and asks her to let Jack go, as she loves him. Simone offers to take the blame when Tyler Brennan crashes a car. He gives her $600 and a place to stay at the Men's Shed. Paige discovers bottles of pills in Simone's bag and when Jack confronts Simone, she tells him she found them in a bin at the hospital and has been selling them. Simone flirts with Brad Willis to make Jack jealous. She later vandalises Blaze Outreach with graffiti, calling Jack a "dirty priest". Simone opens up to Jack about the abuse she suffered at the hands of a priest, and how she loves him. She apologises to him and Paige, before Jack takes her back to Queensland.
18 October	Raj Gupta	Newnest Addakula	The Gupta family are Gary Canning, Sheila Canning, Xanthe Canning and Amy Williams' opposition in Family Feud.
18 October	Horan Gupta	Udara David	The Gupta family are Gary Canning, Sheila Canning, Xanthe Canning and Amy Williams' opposition in Family Feud.
18 October	Jiya Gupta	Noreen Hokai	The Gupta family are Gary Canning, Sheila Canning, Xanthe Canning and Amy Williams' opposition in Family Feud.
18 October	Holly Gupta	Jenny Tkaz	The Gupta family are Gary Canning, Sheila Canning, Xanthe Canning and Amy Williams' opposition in Family Feud.
19 October–23 November	Kazuko Sano	Linda Chin	Kazuko is David and Leo Tanaka's great-grandmother, who has been admitted to Erinsborough Hospital with pneumonia. David asks her about his father, after learning his name might be Bradley. Kazuko says she cannot remember and David leaves when she tells him she is tired. David takes Kazuko out for the day. His friend Aaron Brennan brings a golf cart to them, so Kazuko does not have to walk. David shows Kazuko a picture of Bradley Satchwell, but she denies knowing him. She refuses to tell David who his father is and asks to be taken back to the hospital. Leo and Amy Williams spend the morning with Kazuko. Amy urges Kazuko to tell David and Leo about their father. Kazuko's condition worsens and she tells David to renounce homosexuality, just before she dies.
27 October	Nick Deng	Ryland J Powell	Nick attends a tertiary application class at Blaze Outreach. Paige Smith helps him to write his application. Simone Bader distracts Nick with a mobile phone game and tells him he can have a turn, but Paige tells him to carry on with his application.
27 October	Lara Thornton	Terri Lynette Svoronos	Lara is Bradley Satchwell's former wife, who meets with David and Leo Tanaka. When she mentions that Bradley had affairs, David asks if any of the women got pregnant and Lara says it could be possible. Lara also tells them that Bradley suffers from alcoholism.
31 October–16 November 2017	Bec Simmons	Zenya Carmellotti	Bec flirts with Angus Beaumont-Hannay at the Erinsborough High Halloween dance. Months later, Piper Willis buys a fake ID from Bec. Elly Conway suspends Bec for selling the IDs, and Bec assumes Piper told Elly where she got the ID from.
7–29 November	Mack Sweetin	Brian Edmond	Brooke Butler meets with Mack to tell him how much money she has made from a jewellery party. He tells her she has reduced her debt to $4000, before she reveals that she gave her daughter Xanthe Canning one of the real pieces. Brooke asks Mack to hold off on shipping the fake jewels to her customers, so she can spend more time with Xanthe. Mack agrees to think about it, but warns Brooke that the penalty clause will kick in if she is late with her next repayment. Days later, Mack brings Brooke the fake jewellery, and tells her to move on from Erinsborough, but she asks for more time because of Xanthe. Mack asks Brook for her latest repayment and then threatens to tell Xanthe everything. He later comes to Number 26 to collect his money, but Brooke tells him she had to give it to someone else and needs more time. Sheila Canning pays Mack the money he is owed.
10 November	Kye Nesmith	Cameron Nicholls	Brad Willis asks Kye why he has not been at Blaze Outreach lately, and Kye says he hates Father Jack Callahan, before cycling away.
11 November	Lee Nikakis	Rigby Gray	Jack Callahan and Paige Smith ask Lee if he has seen Kye Nesmith. Lee tells them Kye is at the Erinsborough Police Station, as he was caught stealing and not wearing a bicycle helmet.
11 November	Rider Ward	Matthew Callan	Rider goes to the same music school as Angus Beaumont-Hannay, and he attends a performance by Angus and Ben Kirk at The Waterhole. Rider sells drugs to the sound engineer and later spikes Angus's drink.
11 November	Sound Engineer	Adam Steele	The sound engineer works at The Waterhole when Angus Beaumont-Hannay and Ben Kirk perform. He buys drugs from Rider Ward.
14 November–12 January 2017	Maxine Cowper	Kate Hood	Maxine is contacted by Paul Robinson, who tells her she has been chosen to take part in a survey at the Robinsons Motel. Paul tells Maxine that he knows about the payments she has been receiving from Brad and Terese Willis, but Maxine refuses to give him details. She then confronts Brad and Terese, asking them how Paul found out. Stephanie Scully later recognises Maxine as Jacka Hills' mother. Maxine demands that Brad find her a better place to live and threatens to tell the police that his son, Ned Willis, burnt her house down. Brad refuses and Maxine contacts Paul to tell him everything. Maxine shows up at Brad's wedding reception and demands more money from Brad and Ned. Ned is arrested after confessing to burning down the house, but he explains that he did not mean to do it. Ned later allows Maxine and her physiotherapist to use the pool at Number 32, as Maxine gets anxious at the public pool.
16 November	Chantrea Banks	Tracie Filmer	Chantrea is a wedding caterer, who meets with her client Lauren Carpenter at her café. Lauren's father Lou Carpenter scares Chantrea off by trying to flirt with her in Cambodian.
17 November	Sara Moran	Kamryn Morrison	Sara comes to Blaze Outreach seeking help after she is thrown out by her parents for being pregnant. Sara voices her concerns to Paige Smith that the church might not approve of her situation, but Paige assures her that Father Jack Callahan would want her to return.
18 November	Derek Meeps	Scott Tweedie	Derek contacts his former girlfriend Elly Conway asking to meet up. He apologises for the bad way he treated her following her miscarriage, and reveals that he saw a counsellor. Elly invites Derek back to her house and they have sex, which leads Elly to think they are reuniting, but Derek mentions that he is engaged and has a baby on the way. Elly then asks him to leave.
25–28 November	Trey Johnson	Jason Buckley	Brooke Butler notices Trey in Harold's Café and leaves before he can see her. Trey later turns up at Number 26, just as Brooke and Xanthe Canning are leaving town. Xanthe reveals that she called him, while Trey tells Brooke that he wants his money. Brooke gives him $2000 and Trey leaves.
