= Xanthe Canning =

Fictional character from the Australian soap opera Neighbours

- Neighbours character
- Portrayed by: Lilly Van der Meer
- Duration: 2016–2019
- First appearance: 22 January 2016
- Last appearance: 8 January 2019
- Introduced by: Jason Herbison
- Spin-off appearances: Xanthe ♥ Ben (2016); Pipe Up (2016); Summer Stories (2016)
In-universe information
- Occupation: Student; Waitress; Day spa worker; Hotel housekeeper
- Father: Gary Canning
- Mother: Brooke Butler
- Half-brothers: Kyle Canning
- Half-sisters: Jesse
- Grandmothers: Sheila Canning
- First cousins: Kylie Canning

Xanthe Canning is a fictional character from the Australian soap opera Neighbours, played by Lilly Van der Meer. The character's introduction was teased by actress Colette Mann, who plays Sheila Canning, during an interview in October 2015. Van der Meer's casting was announced the following month. She taped her first audition for the part at her home. Van der Meer learned she had won the role during her school lunch break, and she relocated from Queensland to Melbourne for filming. Xanthe is the granddaughter of Sheila Canning and the half-sister of Kyle Canning (Chris Milligan). She made her first appearance during the episode broadcast on 22 January 2016. In December 2018, it was confirmed that Van der Meer had relocated to Los Angeles, leading to her exit from the show. Xanthe made her final appearance on 8 January 2019.

Xanthe is portrayed as bubbly and confident. She comes to Erinsborough to live with her father, Gary Canning (Damien Richardson), after being abandoned by her mother. Early storylines for the character saw her clash with Sheila and Kyle, reconcile with her father, and suffer from low self esteem after being bullied. Xanthe developed a romantic relationship with Ben Kirk (Felix Mallard) and the characters starred in their own online spin-off. Following a break-up, Xanthe was assaulted by one of her classmates. Towards the end of 2016, Xanthe's mother, Brooke Butler (Fifi Box), was introduced, causing several problems between Xanthe's family and friends when she scams them out of their money.

During the following year, Xanthe found herself being manipulated by Finn Kelly (Rob Mills), who plots to become Principal of Erinsborough High. Finn uses Xanthe as his spy and he confides in her, after she learns he has a brain aneurysm. Finn later frames Xanthe for poisoning Susan Kennedy (Jackie Woodburne) and she realises that he has been using her all along. Van der Meer said Finn's actions would continue to impact Xanthe's life in the future. The storyline was revisited in 2018 when Finn deliberately strikes Xanthe with a car, leaving her with serious injuries. The character and Van der Meer's performance have received a positive response from critics, with one calling her the "find of the year". Van der Meer was also nominated for a Best Newcomer accolade.

== Casting ==
In October 2015, actress Colette Mann, who plays Sheila Canning, told Daniel Kilkelly of Digital Spy that a new member of the Canning family would be introduced to the show in the coming months. She said the new arrival would start "a big new storyline" for the family. The following month, it was announced that Lilly Van der Meer had joined the cast as Xanthe, Sheila's granddaughter and the half-sister of Kyle Canning (Chris Milligan). Van der Meer taped an audition with the help of her mother at their home. Two days after her 16th birthday, she was contacted by the producers and asked to fly to the studios in Melbourne.

Van der Meer learned she had won the role of Xanthe during her lunch break while she was at school. She then had to relocate from Queensland to Melbourne. The role marks her first major acting job, and she commented "The filming has been going really well, so it's amazing to finally get to see them on screen." To keep up with her studies, Van der Meer does her schooling online in between her scenes. Of Van der Meer's casting, Mann said "Lilly's world has certainly been opened up since joining the show and we're loving having her here. She was already a Canning after just a couple of weeks, we had converted her." Van der Meer made her first appearance as Xanthe on 22 January 2016.

== Development ==
=== Characterisation and introduction ===
Mann thought viewers would like Xanthe, commenting, "There is a toughness to her, but she has a fun side, too." While Van der Meer said Xanthe's arrival would "shake things up a bit". The character's profile on the official website describes her as "naturally confident", but adds that she had to hone her "survival skills" as she grew up with her "flighty" mother Brooke Butler (Fifi Box). Van der Meer enjoys portraying Xanthe's "bubbly personality", commenting "she's so bouncy and in your face the whole time, it's great." Van der Merr said she and Xanthe did not have much in common, which she found "exciting" as an actress, as she did not want to play a copy of herself. She explained, "I'm making completely different character choices for Xanthe. She does everything with a good heart but gets mixed up in the wrong things and goes about it the wrong way." Van der Meer described Xanthe's style as "very girly". She said Xanthe often wore tight tops, and favoured purples and pinks, whereas Van der Meer preferred loose tops and monochrome colours. The actress also said that Xanthe had some "insanely cool" dresses, which she thought she would wear in real life, and that high heels made the character.

Shortly after arriving in Erinsborough, Xanthe attempts to scam a free burger from The Waterhole pub. However, the manager, Sheila Canning, realises what she is up to straight away, causing Xanthe to run off. Xanthe next shows up at Sheila's house on Ramsay Street, where Sheila gives her "short shrift" when she sees her. Xanthe then reveals that she is Sheila's granddaughter. An Inside Soap writer observed that the revelation was "a huge development" for Sheila, who was unaware that her son, Gary Canning (Damien Richardson), had fathered another child. His son, and Xanthe's half-brother, Kyle, was also surprised to learn that he had a sister. Mann commented that Sheila is hurt that Gary kept Xanthe a secret from her, as he is her favourite child. Mann also said that Sheila "doesn't believe it at first, but soon realises it's true. She actually feels sorry for Xanthe, because Gary has kept a lot from her as well." Sheila initially struggles to get along with Xanthe, but Mann was pleased by the new addition to the Canning family, calling her "a great character". Van der Meer said Xanthe would eventually make "a good friend" on Ramsay Street and that she would also get into "trouble, excitement, and mischief."

=== Early storylines ===
Xanthe runs away and stays in a show home. She throws a party at the house and charges an entrance fee, so she can afford to buy a ticket back to Gold Coast. After she is caught by the police, Xanthe is given the choice of staying with Sheila or moving to a foster home. Xanthe opts to stay with Sheila, but she is "devastated" to overhear Kyle complaining about her poor attitude. Kyle later tells Xanthe that she is not wanted, but he realises that he is damaging their relationship and they have their first proper conversation. Sheila enrols Xanthe at Erinsborough High, but she worries that she will come across as stupid. Xanthe is told off for wearing too much make-up and she struggles with a reading exercise, leading to fellow student Alison Gore (Madeleine Andreopoulos) teasing her. Xanthe befriends Piper Willis (Mavournee Hazel) after she stands up for her. Piper does not condone Xanthe's stealing and selling of an exam paper to raise money.

Xanthe was unaware her father was in prison when she arrived, so when Kyle rejects a visiting order, Xanthe asks Sheila to take her to visit Gary instead. Xanthe is "over the moon" to see her father even though things between them are initially awkward. Gary tells Sheila and Xanthe that he could be getting out of prison in the near future, so Sheila invites him to stay with her. A concerned Kyle visits Gary to tell him that Xanthe needs people who are going to stay around and look after her. Sheila later learns that Gary has been in a fight and his parole has been revoked. Xanthe is prepared to fight for her father's release, but Piper's sister informs her that only a prisoner can appeal the decision. Gary refuses to see Xanthe and when she learns what Kyle said to him, she prepares to run away again. A confrontation with Sheila, leads to her suffering a heart attack. Xanthe is briefly taken into care.

Xanthe is the victim of cyber-bullying and suffers from low self esteem. After she is trolled online, Xanthe starts copying the comments and trolls herself. Van der Meer explained that Xanthe feels that if she cannot beat them, she should join them. The actress found the scenes "confronting" and she researched the topic beforehand, as she wanted to know what it was like for children in a similar situation. Of how the bullying affects Xanthe, Van der Meer continued, "When someone calls her stupid or dumb she starts to believe it and the only way to fix that is to become the most beautiful person that she can and she thinks plastic surgery is the only way to do that." Xanthe arranges an appointment with a plastic surgeon to get breast implants, but pulls out at the last minute when her friends tell Sheila. Xanthe later explains that she felt ugly growing up and blames her mother for her body issues.

=== Relationship with Ben Kirk ===
When Xanthe notices Ben Kirk (Felix Mallard) she is immediately attracted to him. She sets about trying to win his affection, and starts by supplying him with an alcoholic drink. Ben's grandparents Karl (Alan Fletcher) and Susan Kennedy (Jackie Woodburne) worry that Xanthe will disrupt Ben's attempts to settle down and get his life "on a positive course." After Karl and Susan order Ben to stay away from Xanthe, she tells him that she has come up with several ideas to get around the ban. But Ben is reluctant to go against his grandparents' wishes.

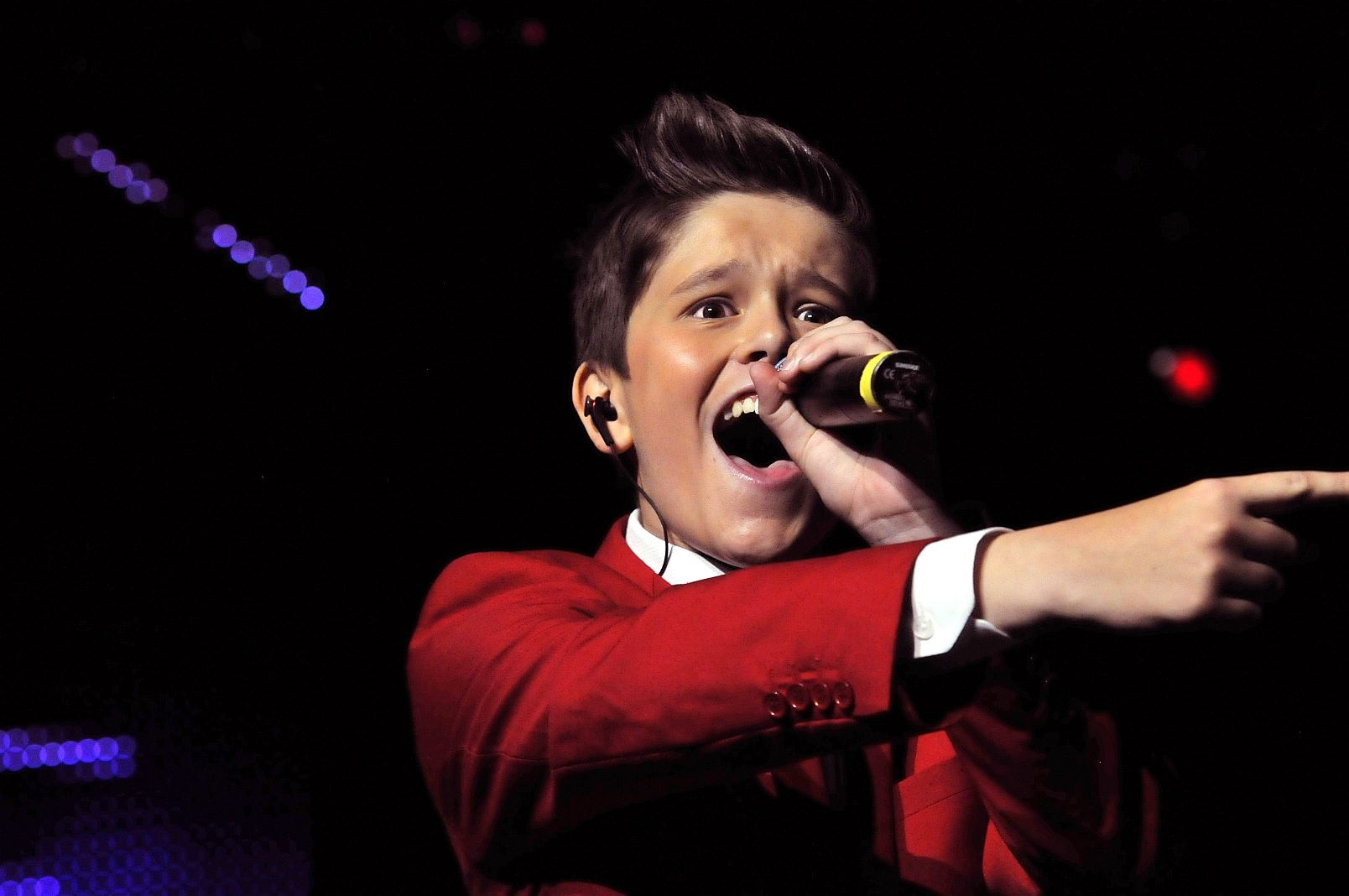
Angus Beaumont-Hannay, played by singer Jai Waetford (pictured), briefly comes between Ben and Xanthe, after he develops an interest in her.

In April 2016, it was announced that Xanthe and Ben would star in an online spin-off titled Xanthe ♥ Ben. The 20-part series was available via the show's Instagram account, and focused on the characters before and after the Lassiters' Hotel explosion. Xanthe and Ben take a bag of money belonging to Tom Quill (Kane Felsinger) from the hotel. Van der Meer pointed out that Ben and Xanthe were slowly forming "a connection". Although Ben appears uninterested, Xanthe is "infatuated" and Van der Meer commented that she is "very forward" in her approach. The actress hoped the characters would eventually get together.

Angus Beaumont-Hannay (Jai Waetford) later takes an interest in Xanthe. Angus also steals Ben's share of Tom Quill's money, leading Ben to try and break into Angus's school locker to get it back. The boys fight and Angus tells Susan that they were fighting over Xanthe, which pleases her. Xanthe spends time with Ben after he is suspended and feels that they are getting on well. However, she is "left humiliated" when Ben tells her the real reason why he and Angus were fighting. Xanthe is also annoyed with Angus, but he wins her over with his "charms". Waetford said Angus is "super flirty" with Xanthe. He buys her things and realises that he may have a reason to stay in Erinsborough after all. Angus later helps Xanthe get out of an English exam, by pulling the fire alarm and his actions win her "approval".

Ben and Xanthe attend the school formal together and finally start dating. Xanthe purchases an expensive dress for the dance and keeps the tags on, so she can return it. However, Piper later throws a drink at teacher Elly Conway (Jodi Anasta) and Xanthe is accidentally drenched. As Xanthe worries about how she can pay for the dress, Ben distracts her with a kiss. However, the following day Xanthe learns that Gary paid Ben to take her to the formal and she is "heartbroken" by the revelation, leading her to end their relationship. A few weeks later, Xanthe and Ben arrange a date, but Xanthe is late when she becomes trapped in a shed with a snake. Xanthe calls out for help, but this agitates the snake and Xanthe worries that it will bite her. Piper eventually comes to her rescue. Unaware of the reason why Xanthe was late, Ben kisses Alison, which Xanthe sees.

Xanthe and Ben later reconcile. When Ben travels to Gold Coast with Madison Robinson (Sarah Ellen) for a singing audition, Xanthe decides to follow him and consummate their relationship. Van der Meer explained that Xanthe and Ben are "loved-up" and are at a stage in their relationship where all they want to do is be together. When Ben and Madison leave Erinsborough, Xanthe feels left out and just decides to join them. She also wants to show Ben where she grew up. While Ben and Xanthe are at the beach, they are interrupted by the arrival of Angus, who is in Queensland with his father. After catching up with Angus, Ben and Xanthe go to his hotel room to have sex. However, they are stopped by Susan, which embarrasses them both. Van der Meer commented, "I think it's probably for the best – this was a spur-of-the-moment thing for Xanthe, and she hadn't considered the consequences."

Ben and Xanthe break up due to her mother's interference, and their families begin feuding. They get back together during the feud and keep their reconciliation a secret. Ben and Xanthe arrange to meet outside her house, but when Sheila comes out, Ben is forced to hide behind her car. Sheila gets in the car to drive off, forcing Ben to move. But when Sheila changes her mind, she strikes Ben with the car door. Karl sees the incident and accuses Sheila of attacking Ben, which worsens the feud.

=== Assault ===
Xanthe was assaulted by her classmate Cooper Knights (Charlie Hannaford) in August 2016. After breaking up with Ben, Xanthe begins spending time with Cooper to make Ben jealous. After a "run-in" with Ben, Xanthe goes to Lassiter's Hotel to work on a school film project with Cooper. Cooper "says all the right things", as he tells Xanthe that getting good grades will be a way of getting back at Ben. While they are together, Cooper tries to kiss Xanthe, but she pushes him away. Cooper insists that the kiss is part of the film and refuses to let Xanthe leave the hotel room until they get it right. Xanthe tries to fend off his advances. Xanthe is left "rattled" by the assault and she cannot complete the assignment, which does not go unnoticed by her teacher Elly.

Xanthe eventually opens up to Elly about what happened, but soon learns the accusation will be hard to prove. Shortly after he is accused of sexually assaulting Xanthe, Cooper is attacked. Xanthe's father Gary becomes the prime suspect. Richardson commented that Gary was capable of committing the attack, as he is frustrated with the way the school is handling the situation. Terese Willis (Rebekah Elmaloglou) later learns someone planted cameras in the hotel rooms and she gains footage of Xanthe's assault, which she anonymously posts to her. Ben also learns that Cooper's mother, Maureen Knights (Judith Chaplin), was the one who attacked him and urges him to tell the police. Xanthe is grateful to Ben for saving her father from going back to prison.

=== Mother ===
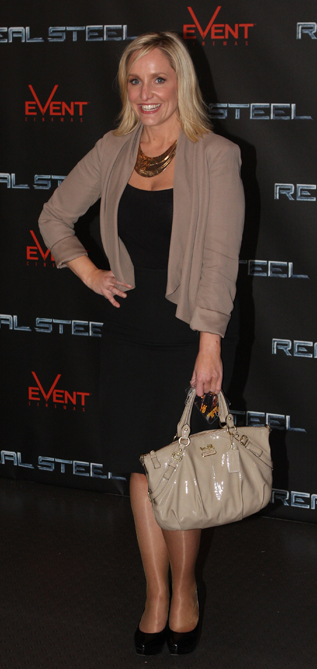
Fifi Box (pictured) was cast as Xanthe's mother Brooke.

Ten months after abandoning her daughter, Brooke Butler visits Xanthe in Erinsborough. Xanthe is both delighted and angry upon seeing her mother, and Brooke struggles to get her to listen to the reasons why she left. It soon becomes clear that Xanthe will not forgive her mother easily, so Brooke tries to convince Gary to help her. Xanthe later catches Sheila going through Brooke's things to find out the real reason she is visiting. Xanthe also voices her concerns about Brooke, although she hopes her mother is in town for her. Brooke's appearance comes just days after the Cannings win $10,000 on Family Feud. Brooke is in debt, but she manages to convince Sheila that she does not need money, as she runs a successful jewellery sales business. Xanthe is initially uncomfortable when Brooke tries to be maternal with her, but she soon helps her organise a jewellery party for their neighbours and Brooke makes several sales.

Brooke plans on taking Xanthe away from Erinsborough. She also grows jealous of Gary's relationship with Terese Willis. Brooke makes it clear to Gary that she is interested in him romantically, which raises Xanthe's suspicions. She believes Brooke is planning on scamming her father and after talking to Elly, Xanthe warns Gary about Brooke's past. Xanthe finds her parents kissing, but still tells Gary about Brooke's previous scams with men. A "vengeful" Brooke later has Elly sacked as Xanthe's tutor. Van der Meer told the official Neighbours website that Xanthe was uncertain about Brooke's reasons for visiting her in Erinsborough, and just as she starts to trust her mother, she suddenly becomes "very skeptical of her". Xanthe learns Brooke has given Gary a fake Rolex watch. She decides to contact the last man Brooke scammed, Trey Johnson (Jason Buckley), and asks him to come to Erinsborough. Meanwhile, Brooke cons Gary out of his Family Feud winnings. She claims the jewellery she sold is being held at customs and she needs to pay a release fee.

Brooke also causes problems in Ben and Xanthe's relationship. She hopes that if Xanthe breaks up with Ben, she will have few reasons to stay in Erinsborough. Xanthe is torn between her mother and her boyfriend. Van der Meer thought Xanthe would "always have that conflict in her mind" if she reconciled with Ben. Brooke leaves town after it emerges that the jewellery she sold was fake. Van der Meer enjoyed working with Box, and she revealed that their strong off-screen bond helped them create a realistic "mother-daughter relationship". Van der Meer hoped Brooke would return, so her relationship with Xanthe would have a chance to grow stronger. Producers brought back Brooke in April 2017. She tries to make amends for her actions.

=== Finn Kelly's manipulation ===
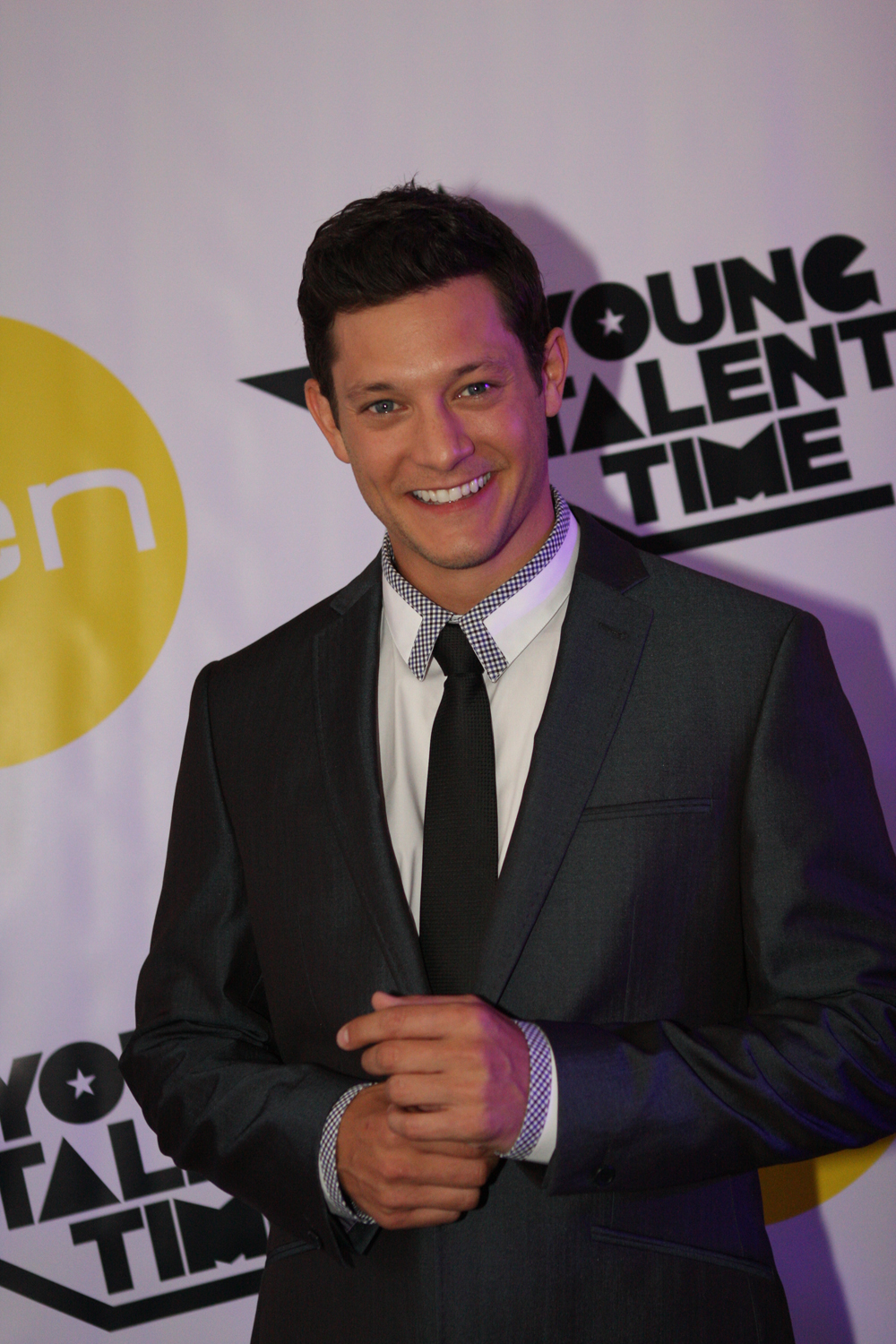
Rob Mills (pictured) was cast as teacher Finn Kelly.

In March 2017, science teacher Finn Kelly (played by Rob Mills) was introduced. Finn takes over tutoring Xanthe from his former girlfriend Elly Conway and he also shows an interest in Ben's career plans. During a confrontation, Elly accidentally pushes Finn down some steps, which Xanthe witnesses. Finn plots to steal the principal job from Elly's aunt Susan Kennedy, while trying to win her back. He confides in Xanthe, but Susan and Elly notice that she is too involved in his personal life, and find her another tutor. Xanthe develops a respect for Finn. She soon learns that he has a brain aneurysm after accidentally reading his hospital patient file. She also agrees to be his spy at the school. Xanthe grows closer to Finn when he joins her for a picnic by the lake, as she waits for her mother. Finn uses the opportunity to manipulate Xanthe further by telling her that he finds Mother's Day difficult since his mother died. Xanthe tells Finn that he needs to stop pushing people away and she encourages him to reconcile with Elly.

Finn gifts Xanthe a necklace for her birthday, and she attends a hospital appointment with him. As Xanthe continues to revel in Finn's attention, she is blind to his manipulative behaviour. He manages to convince her that everyone is out to get him. However, Ben starts to realise that Finn is not a good man and tries to find evidence. After Xanthe visits Finn at his motel room, she realises that she does not love Ben anymore and breaks up with him. Finn switches Susan's vitamins for Piper's pain medication, resulting in her hospitalisation. Finn is appointed acting principal in her place. When Xanthe realises what he has done, he manages to convince her to keep it to herself using "inappropriate flattery". Johnathon Hughes of Radio Times pointed out that Finn is "borderline grooming" Xanthe with his behaviour. Mills was worried about how far Finn was willing to go with Xanthe, saying "I spoke to the writers early on and they explained it wasn't going to be that kind of relationship. Xanthe has fallen for Finn, but it's not reciprocated romantically by him at all. She lacks a positive male role model in her life and Finn is the first person in her life who has really nurtured her."

Finn is eventually investigated by the police for the medication swap, leading him to flee town for Hong Kong. Xanthe decides to go with him, but they are soon found and escorted from the plane. When Xanthe chooses to run away with Finn, she focuses on the fact that she needs to keep him safe. Van der Meer explained that Xanthe will go to "any length" to make sure Finn is care for, as she is the only one who knows the full extent of his condition. Finn tells the police that Xanthe was responsible for poisoning Susan, but she refuses to believe that he is framing her and keeps quiet about what she knows. But when Xanthe visits Finn at his new hiding place, she realises that he has been manipulating her. Finn threatens Xanthe, but she records his confession and he collapses. Van der Meer stated that Finn's actions would have "a massive impact" on Xanthe's life in the future. She continued, "The people in her life despise Finn but she has had an overwhelming love for him that no one else understood. She has eliminated a lot of people from her life during the Finn saga."

The storyline was revisited in May 2018 when Mills reprised his role. Finn returns to Erinsborough with the intention of getting revenge on those who he feels wronged him. Mills admitted that Finn would not have much to do with Xanthe, but he added "when he does, it has a big impact..." It was later confirmed that Finn would strike Xanthe with Elly's car, leaving her with serious injuries. Xanthe is taking part in a scavenger hunt with Chloe Brennan (April Rose Pengilly) when a car comes speeding towards them. Xanthe is "terrified" when she sees Finn is driving it, but she manages to push Chloe out of the way, before the car hits her. Van der Meer commented that Xanthe "just blanks out" afterwards. Finn manages to cause confusion about who is driving the car, which belongs to Elly and she is later arrested. Xanthe's condition is critical and Van der Meer explained that things do not look good for her, saying "She's pretty badly injured – there's a scene where her family is not sure whether she will make it through the night. It's a difficult time for the Cannings, but it was really exciting for me to film, to have my character in such a critical condition. It's a very intense storyline." The actress was glad to have Finn back, as the viewers' reaction to their first storyline had been really positive. She also hoped that Xanthe would get a scene in which she finally confronts Finn for what he has done to her, adding "I want her to finally have the power to beat him!"

=== Departure ===
On 11 December 2018, Digital Spy's Daniel Kilkelly observed that Van Der Meer appeared to have left the serial, and relocated to Los Angeles. He later confirmed that she had filmed her final scenes in September. Xanthe departed during the episode on 8 January 2019, as she moves to Toowoomba to study medicine. In the lead up to her exit, Xanthe does not get the exam results she needs to attend a university in Melbourne, but she is later offered a place in Queensland. Her former boyfriend Ben also contacts her with information about a potential job nearby, which will help her pay for a place to live. After learning that Gary has returned to crime to help pay her fees, Xanthe briefly considers staying in Erinsborough and studying nursing at Eden Hills university, until Gary convinces her to go. She is also tempted to visit Finn, who is in the local hospital, but ultimately decides that "she doesn't need closure with Finn after all, as he's nothing to her and she's finally free of him." After her final scenes aired, Van Der Meer posted a farewell message on her Instagram account thanking the cast, crew and viewers. She said she would "cherish this amazing adventure forever" and added that "I'm so grateful, my heart is so full and I Love You. Thank you."

== Storylines ==
Xanthe comes to Erinsborough to find her father Gary Canning. She attempts to scam a free meal at The Waterhole, before she makes her way to Ramsay Street and introduces herself to his mother and son, Shelia and Kyle Canning. Sheila reveals that Gary is in prison. Xanthe clashes with Kyle and she runs away to stay in a show home. Needing money to get back to Gold Coast, Xanthe throws a party and charges an entry fee. After being caught by the police, she returns to stay with Sheila. On her first day at Erinsborough High, Xanthe struggles with a reading exercise and is taunted by Alison Gore. She also befriends Piper Willis. Xanthe steals a copy of an exam, which she sells to other students. She is caught and suspended for a week. Sheila has a heart attack during an argument with Xanthe. As Sheila cannot care for her, Xanthe is briefly taken into care. Xanthe finds employment at Harold's Cafe, after Sheila bribes the owner into giving her the job. Xanthe develops a crush on Ben Kirk, but after she gets drunk trying to impress him, his grandparents, Susan and Karl Kennedy, ban Ben from seeing her. Xanthe later tells Ben that she has arranged a meet-and-greet with Angus Young at Lassiter's Hotel. While there, they take money from Tom Quill's room. Xanthe is the victim of cyber-bullying and she feels conscious about her body, leading her to consider having breast enlargement surgery.

Angus Beaumont-Hannay takes an interest in Xanthe. He pulls a fire alarm to get Xanthe out of an exam, and then buys her concert tickets. Xanthe decides to lose her virginity to Angus, but Sheila stops them. Angus tells her they should just be friends. Tom Quill demands his money back, and Xanthe sells clothing and busks with Angus and Ben to raise the money. Gary, who has been released from prison, orders them to tell the police about the money. Xanthe falls behind at school and requires a tutor, but she uses the money to buy an expensive dress for the school formal. Xanthe plans to return the dress, but Piper accidentally throws a drink on it. Ben and Xanthe kiss at the formal, but she then learns Gary paid Ben to take her. Xanthe and Ben make up and arrange to meet, but Xanthe is late when she becomes trapped in a shed with a snake. Ben kisses Alison and they begin dating. Xanthe is assaulted by Cooper Knights, but lack of evidence means he is not charged. Eventually video footage proves the assault. Ben and Xanthe reconcile. She follows him to Gold Coast and they plans to have sex, but Susan interrupts them. The Cannings and Amy Williams (Zoe Cramond) win $10,000 on Family Feud. Xanthe contacts her half-sister, Jesse, to find their mother Brooke, who comes to Erinsborough shortly after. Brooke causes tension between Ben and Xanthe, and then scams Gary and their neighbours.

Xanthe and Ben date in secret while their families are feuding. During their work experience at the hospital, Xanthe realises that she wants to become a nurse. Xanthe is tutored by Finn Kelly and she accidentally sees his patient file, which reveals he has a brain aneurysm. Finn manipulates Xanthe in his bid to become principal of Erinsborough High. She breaks up with Ben, as she develops feelings for Finn. Finn is discovered to have swapped Susan's vitamins with opiates, and he attempts to flee to Hong Kong. Xanthe decides to go with him, but they are removed from the plane. Finn plants the opiates in Xanthe's bag. Xanthe realises that Finn has set her up and lied to her, so she records a confession. Finn suffers a stroke and Xanthe calls for help. She later breaks down in Elly's arms. Finn asks to see Xanthe at the hospital, where he apologises for manipulating her. Xanthe decides to quit school, but Susan persuades her to take work experience at the hospital instead. Xanthe is questioned by Karl about some missing morphine. He sends her home after she assumes that he is accusing her of taking the painkillers. Xanthe is attacked online by Piper's trolls. After Piper's mother and Gary's fiancée Terese Willis (Rebekah Elmaloglou) is diagnosed with cancer, Xanthe decides to return to school to support Piper. After enduring the gossip, she finds a report from Finn in her bag and flees the school. Sheila accepts Xanthe's decision to leave school for good. Xanthe is offered a job at the Lassiter's Spa, after she helps treat Sheila's hives which are caused by a skin wrap.

Xanthe becomes jealous of Ben and Yashvi Rebecchi's (Olivia Junkeer) closeness, and later admits that she still has feelings for Ben. She apologises for breaking up with him in the first place, and they get back together. Xanthe applies for a housekeeping job at Lassiters. She initially rejects Ben's suggestion of returning to Erinsborough High, but changes her mind as she wants to be a nurse. Xanthe loses her virginity to Ben, and Terese walks in on them afterwards. When Ben leaves for Oakey, they try to maintain a long distance relationship, but Xanthe realises she needs to break up with Ben, so she can concentrate on her school work. Xanthe befriends Chloe Brennan (April Rose Pengilly). When Xanthe needs consoling, Chloe buys her an alcoholic drink even though Xanthe is underage. During a school camp out in the bush, Xanthe joins in the search for a missing Susan and Karl. She comes across Karl, who has fallen down an embankment, and helps him to reset his dislocated knee cap. She calls for a rescue helicopter, but when Karl falls unconscious, Xanthe has to perform CPR. David Tanaka (Takaya Honda) praises Xanthe for her actions in keeping Karl alive, and she considers becoming a doctor. Xanthe has her 18th birthday party at The Flametree Retreat, and Freya Stone (Adele Wilson) spikes Xanthe and Piper's drinks. Xanthe later helps to matchmake Piper and Cassius Grady (Joe Davidson), despite having feelings for him herself. While taking part in a scavenger hunt with Chloe, Xanthe is struck by Elly's car, which is being driven by Finn. Xanthe undergoes surgery to reduce swelling on her brain and is placed into an induced coma. When she wakes up, she initially says Elly was driving the car, before remembering it was Finn.

Xanthe studies for the UMAT, but she suffers a seizure halfway through the exam and has to stop. Xanthe suffers further seizures and Cassius helps her with her physiotherapy. After receiving a six-figure payout from her insurance company, Xanthe applies for a private university to study medicine. Gary offers to make up the rest of the total. He later explains that Amy gave him the money, after he borrowed some from a criminal who left a bag of money with him. Xanthe, Elly and Susan realise that Elly's sister Bea Nilsson (Bonnie Anderson) has gone to find Finn at a cabin in the bush. They find her, but Finn catches up to them and attempts to hurt Bea. He is pushed off a cliff and left in a coma. The women agree not to reveal who pushed Finn, but Susan eventually confesses. Xanthe gets a job at the day spa to help Gary pay Amy back. Xanthe gets a high ATAR score, but learns that it is not enough to get into the Melbourne university. She is offered a place at the Toowoomba campus and Ben tells her there is a job available at a local nursing home, so she can afford to pay rent and bills. After learning that Gary has been moving stolen items, including solar inverters from Amy's building site, Xanthe decides to turn the university place down and study nursing at Eden Hills instead, so she can pay Amy back with the refunded money. Ben urges her to reconsider and not settle for something she may regret, which convinces Xanthe to change her mind. After some initial hesitation and a pep talk from Sheila, Piper drives Xanthe to the airport after she says goodbye to her family and friends. Just over a year later, Kyle calls Xanthe to tell her Gary has been murdered by Finn. Xanthe is too upset to return to Erinsborough but her aunt Naomi Canning (Morgana O'Reilly) spends time with her in Queensland after his funeral.

== Reception ==
"Tackling her role with instant gusto, Van der Meer has easily won her way into viewers' hearts with her ability to like Xanthe regardless of her behaviour."

— A Soap World columnist on Van der Meer's performance as Xanthe.

Briana Domjen of The Daily Telegraph cited Xanthe's appearance in a teaser trailer for 2016, prior to her introduction, as an example of how Neighbours had joined other Australian television shows in employing a "sex sells" philosophy. She commented, "The days of woolly jumpers and lingering looks at Lassiter's are clearly over." Network Ten drama executive Claire Tonkin added that viewers were excited about the introduction of characters like Xanthe, as there was "a lot of anticipation" about how they would fit into the cast and whom they would be paired with romantically. Ben Pobjie of The Sydney Morning Herald was critical of Xanthe's name, among others, saying "the writers have moved on away from using real names". He also thought Xanthe, Piper and Paige appeared to be the same person and branded them "hyper-millennials".

Shortly after Xanthe's arrival, Sarah Ellis of Inside Soap commented, "I'm sure Sheila will soon whip wayward Xanthe into shape." While another writer for the publication branded the character "troublesome". Of Ben and Xanthe's flirting, Ellis wrote, "'Banthe' needs to happen!" In February 2016, Stephanie Bennett of news.com.au observed "while her character has only been on-air since January, she is already proving to be one of the show's most popular." A Soap World columnist noted that Xanthe made "an immediate impression" and dubbed her a "brazen blonde". A critic for TV Soap called her a "wild child", and Phillip Portman of the Daily Star dubbed her a "bad girl" and "Barbie's Aussie cousin".

At the 2016 Digital Spy Reader Awards, Van der Meer was nominated for the Best Newcomer accolade. Andrew Mercado, writing for MediaWeek also praised Van der Meer, saying she was the show's "find of the year as she showed real comedic flair playing Xanthe." Xanthe was placed at number thirty-two on the Huffpost's "35 greatest Neighbours characters of all time" feature. Journalist Adam Beresford described her as "the standout star among recent Neighbours teens, the wonderfully named Xanthe had a winning combination of charm and comic timing." He added that Xanthe's romance with Ben was "sweet" and Finn's manipulation had viewers "hooked".
