= Jack Callahan (Neighbours) =

- Neighbours character
- Portrayed by: Andrew Morley
- Duration: 2016–2018, 2020
- First appearance: 4 April 2016
- Last appearance: 20 March 2020
- Introduced by: Jason Herbison
In-universe information
- Other names: John Doe
- Occupation: Catholic priest; Handyman; School counsellor
- Sons: Gabriel Smith

Jack Callahan is a fictional character from the Australian soap opera Neighbours, played by Andrew Morley. The actor was cast in late 2015 and landed the regular role of Jack. Morley had previously played Spencer Harrington in fellow soap opera Home and Away for two years. He made his first appearance during the episode broadcast on 4 April 2016. The character departed on 30 March 2018, but Morley later reprised the role and returned on 26 February 2020, as part of the show's 35th anniversary celebrations.

When Jack first arrives, he is involved in the explosion at Lassiters hotel and left unable to recall his identity. Morley described the character as one with a "clean slate" due to his amnesia and lack of family ties or connections to Erinsborough. Two months after his arrival, his name and identity as a Catholic priest was revealed. His storylines have subsequently focused on the conflict of his religious vocation and relationship with Paige Smith (Olympia Valance).

His storylines have also focused on his rivalry with Mark Brennan (Scott McGregor) despite Morley stating that Jack has a lot of respect for him and feels that he is a good role model for his son. The character made a tough decision over leaving the priesthood and viewers have expressed negative feelings towards his relationship with Stephanie Scully (Carla Bonner) with one calling their relationship "disgusting" and another seeing the coupling as "random". Katie Baillie from Metro UK showed her compassion for Jack but later felt that he didn't act like an adult when he gets into a fight with Mark.

== Casting ==
On 31 January 2016, Holly Byrnes from The Daily Telegraph announced the former Home and Away star Andrew Morley's casting on Neighbours as John Doe. Morley was asked to film an audition tape after he had received an email from his manager whilst in Cambodia helping raise money and awareness towards human trafficking. Morley began filming in December 2015. Morley commented on working with Paige Smith actress Olympia Valance describing her as "extremely friendly" and of a "great energy". Valance reminded Morley of Demi Harman, who he worked with early on on Home And Away.

When Morley first got the role, he was not briefed on what his character's true identity was and where the character was going. He also said that his character's alias 'John Doe' was still written on his scripts at times he was filming scenes under the name Jack. He later added that he now knows what direction his character is going in and said, "it'll be a big story arc". He also said that the audience will be taken through "a really interesting journey of trying to work out who he is" in finding out what his character is doing in Erinsborough, what significance his character is going to have and who his character will be involved with. Morley added that his character has a "clean slate" as he has no connections to anyone in Erinsborough.

== Development ==
=== Introduction and characterisation ===
"It was a big shock to me and it will be for the fans too. I haven't even told some of my friends and family. The ones that I have told have all said: 'Are you serious? How are you going to play that?!' It's been a brilliant journey over the past few months getting to this point."

— Morley on playing a priest

Jack arrives in Erinsborough with no family ties and a 'mysterious past' of which Paige helps him discover. Morley said that "Paige helps him to discover who he is", together they work out why he is in Erinsborough. Morley said, "It's been fun piecing together the puzzle." After he is involved in a fire at the Lassiter's complex in his first scenes, he suffers amnesia. Determined to find out his past, Paige becomes curious in Jack and decides to visit him in hospital, later becoming fascinated by him. With his details unknown, he is given the name John Doe. When talking about John's future identity, Morley described it as "completely off the scales". He also guaranteed that nobody would pick what his character turns out to be. Morley said "It's a good little journey and the audience is going to love it."

He later remembers that he is a Catholic Priest and goes to the police station to inform them of his past and his true identity is confirmed as Father Jack Callahan. Jack is described to be a "man of God" and to have "devoted his life to religion and helping people", with being a "genuine, kind, sincere and loving person". His reasonings for being in Erinsborough were also revealed, with Jack only passing through and staying at a friends house. He was at Lassiter's on the day of the blast off to help someone who had talked to him during confession.

=== Relationship with Paige Smith ===
After the explosion at Lassiter's, Paige visits John Doe in hospital, hoping to find out about his past. Mandy Franze (Kristy Best) turns up and claims she knows John and is the love of his life. After Mandy kisses John, Paige is forced to accept that she has lost him for good. Paige falls for John and the feeling is mutual, with Morley describing it as "true love for both of them" and that "Jack has never felt like this about anybody." However, with John revealed as Jack Callahan, a Catholic priest, Morley also explains that it will be a dilemma for Jack on deciding who he will devote his life to. Paige meets Dustin Oliver (Kevin Clayette), a person from Jack's past, and kisses him, much to Jack's dismay. After Jack dreams of a kiss with Paige, he goes to Father Guidotti (John Orcsik), the local priest for advice. He later prays and asks God for a sign.

Torn between two loves – Paige and the Priesthood. Struggling with this crisis of faith – Jack knows he must eventually choose between the Church or the woman he wants to be with.

— The official Neighbours website on Jack's tough decision.

After Father Guidotti dies, Jack sees this as the sign he asked for from God, with Jack feeling his death was down to God allowing him to continue his work in Erinsborough. With Paige feeling upset about Jack's decision, she confesses to her mother, Lauren Carpenter (Kate Kendall), that she is unable to think straight around him, vowing to keep her distance. However, after she realises Jack shares the same feelings as her, she decides to boycott the plan and spend as much time around him as possible. Paige later goes to confession and tells Jack of her recent hookups, to show that she has moved on from him. Daniel Kilkelly from Digital Spy commented on Paige's visit to confession saying, "Jack Callahan is probably used to awkward confessional visits every now and again, but this one really takes the biscuit".

After Paige dresses up as a nun, Jack feels like she is making a mockery of what he believes in. This leaves them no longer on speaking terms, but after Paige goes on a hot air balloon trip that ends up crashing, Jack comes to find Paige and the pair sleep together. However, an old friend of Jack's, Simone Bader (Kahli Williams), turns up in Erinsborough and after finding out Jack had slept with Paige, she questions if she is worth leaving the priesthood over.

"He doesn't try to fight his feelings and it's clear he wants a happy ever after with Paige and their son. The reason he left the priesthood was so they could be a proper family. Sadly she doesn't feel the same, Paige is deeply in love with Mark but Jack is hoping they won't last! Then he finds out Mark intends to propose on the glamping trip."

— Morley on his characters feelings for Paige

Paige finds out she is pregnant with Jack's baby, but decides against telling him. When Jack comes to Paige's rescue after she is involved in a car accident, she reveals to Jack that the baby is his. Paige considers leaving Erinsborough to move to Queensland along with her parents, taking the baby away and leaving Jack behind, but ultimately decides to stay. Paige goes back to where the baby is conceived and goes into labour and gives birth to a son, Gabriel Smith (Kian Bafekrpour). Jack along with Karl Kennedy (Alan Fletcher) come to Paige's rescue and takes her and the baby to hospital.

The pair later reunite and sleep together, betraying both their partners. Morley commented in an interview with Radio Times, "At that moment and with Gabe in front of them, everything felt so right and they went for it. That gave Jack hope but afterwards Paige wants to bury it and forget it happened. This hurts Jack who wants to tell Steph, even though he knows she'd be upset, but Paige is not of the same mindset and regrets it." He added, "Most of the feedback suggests fans want Jack and Paige to be together. It was hard playing the Steph and Jack relationship because it didn’t have the substance he had with Paige, so naturally the audience isn't going to believe in it as much. I loved working with Carla Bonner (Steph Scully) as we get on great and hang out a lot. But the audience will want Jack with Paige, though Paige is committed to Mark Brennan (Scott McGregor) who is a great guy and a lovable character... Fans will be torn as no one is the villain here, and everyone ends up getting hurt in some way."

=== Relationship with Stephanie Scully ===
After Steph helps Jack look after his son, Gabe, they develop feelings for one another and have sex. However Paige later bans Steph from being around Gabe due to her past mental health issues. This causes Steph to end her relationship with Jack, feeling that he needs to focus on his family and believing that things wouldn't have worked out with Jack in the long run anyway. Continuing their relationship however, Jack realises he is not Steph's priority when 'having a relationship' didn't feature on a list of what she wants to do in her life.

After Steph returns from a Christmas break with her mother, Steph expects to see Jack waiting for her when she returns, however instead he is with Paige. When he eventually sees Steph, he cancels his lunch with her to spend time with Gabe and Paige, but Steph insists she comes along too. She later becomes irritated as Jack's attention is focused on Gabe during the outing. However, Steph talks to her friend Toadfish Rebecchi (Ryan Moloney) about her concerns, feeling the age difference between herself and Jack may be too big. Toadie later gives Jack advice on how he can keep Steph happy in their relationship.

On 25 January 2018, Sasha Morris from The Daily Star questioned if this was the beginning of a love triangle between the couple and Paige. On 5 February 2018, Daniel Kilkelly from Digital Spy reported that Jack and Paige would have a one-night stand. Kilkelly also reported that Steph would seek revenge when she finds out about the affair with her ransacking Jack's room at the backpackers in a fit of anger but later confesses to the police of her actions. This brings repercussions for Steph as her planned trip for visiting her son in Fiji is ruined as her overseas visa is revoked due to the criminal charges for the damage.

=== Rivalry with Mark Brennan ===
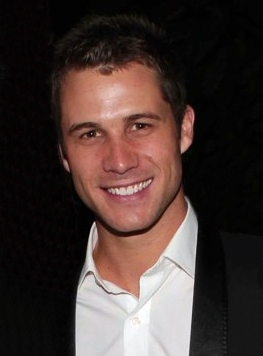
Scott McGregor (pictured) plays Mark, Jack's rival.

On 13 November 2017, it was reported by Kilkelly (Digital Spy) that Jack would "drive" Paige and Mark's relationship apart when he discovers that the pair are arguing. Jack challenges Mark about his behaviour, but without an explanation Mark is forced to steer clear from Paige and his baby.

Later, in December 2017, Digital Spy reported that Jack would get into a "violent" fight with Mark in the new 2018 season. After Gabe is kidnapped, with Paige dating Mark, he becomes involved and tensions rise between the pair. With Elly Conway (Jodi Anasta) and Amy Williams (Zoe Cramond) determined to get Jack and Mark on better terms, they decide to get them together with a game of Croquet. But a feud starts to arise and meets its climax when the pair have a "full-blown brawl" in public. Sophie Dainty from Digital Spy described the scenes as "explosive". During the fight, Jack's anger causes him to tell Mark how he really feels and blames Mark for his son's recent abduction.

After Paige discusses the "awkwardness", "occasional violence" and how Jack feels threatened by Mark as he feels he is "muscling in on his family", Paige goes to see Jack. When Paige turns up, old feelings arise from their previous relationship and Jack ends up sleeping with Paige. When asked in an interview with Radio Times about how Jack feels about Mark — Morley replied, "Jack has a lot of respect for him, he's nice guy and a great role model for Gabe. However he wasn't thinking of Mark's feelings when he slept with Paige, although Jack is upset that he's hurt the guy. Paige truly wants to settle down with Mark, but she knows what she did with Jack and her mind is in two places at once..." On 17 February 2018, Kilkelly (Digital Spy) reported that tensions may be flaring up again when Mark's temper puts Gabe in danger whilst with Paige and Jack.

=== Departure and return ===
On 19 March 2018, it was confirmed that Morley would be leaving Neighbours alongside Valance. After seeing how much Mark is struggling with their relationship, Paige and Jack decide to leave Erinsborough for a fresh start in Queensland with their son.

On 24 November 2019, Neighbours confirmed that Morley would reprise the role for the serial's 35th anniversary celebrations. Jack returns alongside Paige on 26 February 2020.

== Storylines ==
Shortly after arriving at the Lassiter's Complex, John bumps into Paige Smith. They run into each other again outside the hotel, just as the boiler room explodes. John throws himself on top of Paige to protect her. He is taken to the hospital, where he remains in a coma. One of the nurses tells Paige that they do not know who he is, as he had no identification on him. Paige stays by his bedside and is present when he wakes up. John has amnesia and cannot remember his own name. Paige gets him a job with Amy Williams's handywoman business. Amy also offers him a place to live. John meets with a hotel employee, who spoke to him on the day of the explosion, but she cannot help him find out who he is. Paige puts up flyers, asking if anyone can identify John. A hotel guest named Steven Aniston (Garikai Jani) recalls John saying he has links with Geelong. John and Paige travel to the city and stay in a local hostel. Just as Paige and John are about to kiss, Paige spots a photograph of John with another man, who they later learn is Dustin Oliver (Kevin Clayette). They arrange to meet Dustin in Erinsborough. He greets John as "Jay", before he runs away when he spots Mark Brennan in his police uniform. John decides to leave town, but Paige persuades him to stay. John has two hypnosis sessions with Karl Kennedy, who later refers him to a psychiatrist.

Mandy Franze claims to be John's girlfriend, but they soon find out she is lying. Paige tries to kiss John, but he rejects her and Paige asks him to leave. John sees a woman driving a van and says he remembers her and the company, which he later learns repairs boilers. John suffers flashbacks of the Lassiter's boiler room and believes that he may have caused the explosion. He then goes to the police to confess, but the detective tells him that he did not cause the explosion. John kisses Paige. The witness who saw him on the morning of the explosion later reveals she was paid to lie. John's memory returns and he is able to tell Mark that Julie Quill (Gail Easdale) and Jacka Hills (Brad McMurray) caused the explosion. Paige comes to the station and John emerges in clerical clothing. He reveals his name is Jack Callahan and that he is a priest. He explains that he was questioning his faith when he came to Erinsborough and was staying with a priest in Elliot Park, but when he went away to Rome, Jack was left to counsel Julie at the church. He followed her to Lassiter's and saw her in the boiler room, but did not expect her to cause an explosion. Jack briefly leaves Erinsborough to see his family and Paige says she will wait for him. Jack faces conflicting pressures between his love for Paige and his vow of celibacy. Jack looks after a little girl named Poppy Jarvis, who has cystic fibrosis, whilst her mother is in hospital, and he organises a fancy dress party for her. Ari Philcox reveals in the confessional that he's been releasing the snakes. Jack's priestly vows forbid him passing on this information. Jack thinks that Paige is the intended target, but later learns that Steph is.

Jack receives an audio message from Paige's sister, Piper Willis (Mavournee Hazel) of Paige declaring her love to him while on a hot air balloon trip, but during the voice message, Jack learns that Paige and her family are in danger and drives to the crash site. Jack sees everyone except for Paige, and Piper tells him that Paige jumped off the balloon before it crashed. Jack goes to find her and finds her red scarf in a dam. After searching, he finds an unconscious Paige on the shore, who suffers from hypothermia. He carries her to an abandoned shack to warm her up. Jack told Paige that he knows how sorry she is and confess his love to Paige. The pair then sleep together, reconciling their relationship. They are soon found by Paige's father, Brad Willis (Kip Gamblin). Jack leaves for Queensland, later returning with his former girlfriend, Simone Bader, causing Paige to again feel betrayed. Jack and Paige break up as he chooses the church over her again. Jack becomes jealous over Paige's friendship with David Tanaka (Takaya Honda). Jack finds out that Paige is pregnant and Jack assumes he's the father, but Paige says that he's not and that David is the father. Jack wants Dustin Oliver to help with a new refugee centre, but Dustin refuses thinking, wrongly, that he may be the father of Paige's baby, and wants to get away. When Jack learns that he is the father of Paige's baby, he considers leaving the priesthood and remaining in Erinsborough with Paige, whose parents are leaving for the Gold Coast. Paige considers leaving with them, but decides to stay, so Jack can be with his child. Paige returns to the shack where their child was conceived and goes into labour. Jack and Karl find her and help deliver her son. Paige loses consciousness and is rushed to the hospital, while the baby is taken to a neonatal unit. Jack decides to leave the church. Lauren returns to support Paige, and is initially angry with Jack for letting Paige go off on her own. Paige eventually regains consciousness and names their son Gabriel. After learning Paige's sister is ill, Jack encourages Paige to go to Queensland with Lauren to support her. Having decided to give up his position within the church, Jack calls Bishop Green (Mirko Grillini). Bishop Green tells Jack that if he quits the priesthood the church will close. He decides to go through with his plan and leaves the church. He moves into Erinsborough Backpackers. Jack declares his feelings for Paige, but she rejects him. Jack works with Stephanie Scully on an application for the Most Liveable Suburb competition and they kiss. Steph initially calls it a mistake, but they later have sex and soon begin a relationship. Jack supports Steph when she thinks she is having a mental health relapse, and when she turns her motel into a cancer wellness centre. Jack secures a job at Erinsborough High as a counsellor, but some students accuse him of promoting religion, though he is later vindicated.

When Gabe is kidnapped by Louise McLeod (Maria Theodorakis), Jack blames Mark for his family's involvement in the dodgy dealings of Hamish Roche (Sean Taylor), the father of Mark's brother Tyler (Travis Burns). He also calls the police when Mark attempts to negotiate with Louise despite Mark advising him not to, delaying the search. Although Gabe is later found and returned by Cassius Grady (Joe Davidson), Jack is still steamed with Mark, resulting in a brawl with him during a day out. Jack and Paige later have a one-night stand, which Steph and Mark discover after the four take a glamping trip. They break up with their respective partners, and after realising the damage their actions have caused, Jack, Paige and Gabe move to Queensland to be closer to Paige's parents.

Two years later, Paige returns to Erinsborough and informs her former stepmother Terese Willis (Rebekah Elmaloglou) that she believes Jack is having an affair. Jack also returns and reveals that he was talking to Mark Gottlieb (Bruce Samazan) about rejoining the priesthood. They later decide to break up and Jack returns to Queensland. He later returns with Gabe after Paige announces that she is marrying Mark. The following day, he presides over Sky Mangel (Stephanie McIntosh) and Lana Crawford's (Bridget Neval) wedding. Upon discovering that there is a vacancy at a parish church in Adelaide, where Mark is living, he offers to move there so Paige and Gabe can do so as well.

== Reception ==
Near to his first appearance, while his identity remained unknown, critics were not sure what to make of the character, with Digital Spy's Kilkelly describing him as "mysterious" and Sam Warner commenting: "it's unclear if he is a hero or villain". Their colleague Sophie Dainty felt that Jack caused big changes to Paige's life, describing him as "the priest who turned Paige Smith's life upside down".

As Jack considered leaving the priesthood for Paige, Clare Rigden of the Herald Sun observed: "What a dilemma Jack's facing – go back to the priesthood, or fall into the arms of Paige. Um – hello! As IF that's even a consideration for a twenty-something guy when faced with Olympia Valance diving semi-naked into a backyard pool (yes, this really happens in this episode. And yes, it's uncomfortable and a bit pervy to watch). But, by golly, Jack's taking those vows seriously." Rigden later stated that Jack did not stand a chance "when faced with the likes of Paige". She noted that he had "strong convictions", but wondered how long he could avoid being "seduced by matters of the flesh." However, Rigden admitted that she was enjoying the plot between the pair, writing "We're loving this forbidden love storyline, even if it's all laughingly implausible. A priest who's hot? C'mon!"

Katie Baillie from the Metro felt sorry for Jack after Paige did not tell him about the baby, calling him a "poor lad". She later showed him compassion when Paige told him her baby was his, commenting, "In fairness, it is pretty bad news for the guy, given that he's in the priesthood and shouldn't be making babies. But hearing it from Paige as she thinks she's about to die and learning other people knew this whole time isn't ideal for him either." Baillie later thought Jack may have a bit of a childish side after he fights with Mark over Paige, writing: "Jack can't act like an adult about it all." Fans disliked the pairing of Jack and Steph, labelling the paring "disgusting", "dumb" and "random". When Steph fails to prioritise her relationship with Jack, fans expressed their disapproval of the relationship again, with one saying "I don't like Jack and Steph at all. Time to split!"
