= Mishti Sharma =

Fictional character from Neighbours

- Neighbours character
- Portrayed by: Scarlet Vas
- Duration: 2017–2018
- First appearance: 18 April 2017
- Last appearance: 19 October 2018
- Introduced by: Jason Herbison
In-universe information
- Occupation: Waitress; Gym co-owner; Police officer
- Sisters: Dipi Rebecchi
- Husband: Pavan Nahal (2018–)
- Nephews: Jay Rebecchi
- Nieces: Yashvi Rebecchi; Kirsha Rebecchi

Mishti Sharma is a fictional character from the Australian soap opera Neighbours, played by Scarlet Vas. She made her first appearance during the episode broadcast on 18 April 2017. The character was introduced alongside an extended branch of the show's long-standing Rebecchi family, who consist of Indian-Australians. The show's producer Jason Herbison thought their inclusion was important to better reflect Australian society. Actress Sharon Johal, who plays Mishti's sister Dipi Rebecchi, originally auditioned for the role of Mishti. When writers changed the character's age they hired Vas to play her instead. Vas made her final appearance as Mishti on 19 October 2018.

Mishti is characterised as having a strong passion for physical fitness and is family oriented. She often plays the role of peacemaker in her family when they argue. Vas has described Mishti as a "harsh" character who is "righteous about staying within the law." When Mishti arrives in Erinsborough she is keen to start a new life, suggesting she has a troubled past. She forms a business partnership with Aaron Brennan (Matt Wilson) and opens a gym called The Shed. But viewers soon learn that Mishti is an ex-police officer who left the force following the death of her boyfriend Zander. Mishti's storylines have mainly focused on her relationship with Leo Tanaka (Tim Kano) and their many dramas. She also features in a pregnancy and miscarriage story. The character returns to the police force and begins investigating her neighbours who she believes are embroiled in the murder of Hamish Roche (Sean Taylor). Reaction to Mishti has been positive and Claire Crick from Soaplife branded her and Leo a "power couple".

== Casting ==
The character and casting details were announced on 27 March 2017. Mishti is Dipi Rebecchi's (Sharon Johal) sister. She arrives in Erinsborough with Dipi's husband Shane Rebecchi (Nicholas Coghlan), an extended branch of the show's long-standing Rebecchi family. The new Rebecchis are an Indian-Australian family. The show's producer Jason Herbison stated that "we felt it was important that our new extended Rebecchi family reflect the cultural diversity of the community and our audience." Network Ten's Head of Drama, Rick Maier added that "the new Rebecchi clan make for a very welcome addition to the neighbourhood, bringing fun, warmth and intrigue."

Vas was given the part a couple of days after she graduated from university, which she stated "was a dream come true". Vas found her first day on-set "nerve-wracking" but quickly settled into the role. Johal initially auditioned for the role after she received a call from the casting team. Mishti was originally supposed to be older, but casting directors decided to look for a younger actress following changes to the character's age. Producers still liked Johal's work and cast her as the much older Dipi instead. Mishti made her first appearance on 18 April 2017.

== Development ==
=== Characterisation ===
"Mishti is Dipi Rebecchi’s sister. She has passion for physical fitness. She grew up in Sydney, but has just arrived in Erinsborough, keen for a fresh start. While she seems enthusiastic about what this new place has to offer, there is an air of sadness about her. What dark secret is she carrying – and why is she really here?"

— An excerpt taken from Mishti's character biography hosted by Tenplay.

The show's official website have stated that Mishti is keen on physical fitness training and enthusiastic about starting a new life in Erinsborough. But she often appears sad because of her past experiences which are initially kept secret from viewers. Mishti is very family oriented and close to her sister Dipi. She has a history of being in the police force and therefore is keen to uphold the law. Vas has described Mishti as a "harsh" character who is "righteous about staying within the law." She is also "kind, warm-hearted and sweet" despite her career. Vas also believes Mishti "certainly knows what she wants and how to get it."

Vas has said that Mishti's "smarts are like her super powers, she's very savvy." She uses this in her approach to solving crimes. She behaves in a very moral and righteous manner. Vas said that when another character tries to bribe Mishti, it is a mistake because she is "Mrs Morals". In her approach to police work Mishti has proven to be a nosey neighbour. She wants to solve all the crimes in the show. Vas said viewers has obviously picked up on this trait as Mishti has to know everything in an investigation.

=== Introduction ===
Mishti arrives in Erinsborough to see her brother-in-law Shane. Coghlan, who plays Shane has explained that Mishti helps him when he considers moving to the area. The actor also described Mishti as "a dear friend" to Shane and said the two characters "share some pretty serious confidences." Mishti comes to Erinsborough wanting a fresh start. However, Daniel Kilkelly of Digital Spy thought she had a dark secret, noting "there's also an air of sadness about her." One of Mishti's early roles in her family's story was trying to unite the bickering clan. A series of arguments had left the family angry at one another. Mishti realises she needs to solve the family feud following Dipi's refusal to celebrate their annual Hindi ritual Rakhi. Mishti takes drastic action by handcuffing everyone together and forcing them to speak.

Mishti then decides to set-up a business in Erinsborough. She asks fellow fitness enthusiast Aaron Brennan (Matt Wilson) to be her business partner in running a gym. He is hesitant but Mishti goes ahead and buys The Shed. Aaron later agrees to Mishti's plan and they open for business. Vas told a reporter from Inside Soap that Mishti "freaks out" when Aaron first changes his mind. She has to figure out what she can get out of the partnership. The pair eventually bond and become good friends whilst training together. Vas explained that Mishti is "obsessed with fitness" and Aaron's equal passion for it brings them together. Vas was happy with the on-screen friendship because it is "cute". Wilson was also happy with the pairing because it offered his character stability. In another storyline Mishti returns to working as a police officer. When Shane gets drunk and starts threatening Gary Canning (Damien Richardson) and vandalising his garden, she is forced to arrest him. Vas told an Inside Soap reporter that "if Mishti didn't do her job properly it would be very obvious to her superiors." Dipi is angry with Mishti who believes she should have protected her family. But Vas explained that Mishti's role in the Erinsborough is to protect the public and Shane was being drunk and disorderly in public. The actress added that it is a moment when "she is a cop, not a sister."

In Mishti's early month's on-screen it became clear that she was hiding a secret. Mishti does begin to reveal certain aspects of her past to Leo Tanaka (Tim Kano). Vas told Alison James from Soaplife that she begins to confide in him after he earns her trust. Later Mishti and Shane discuss her secret in private which gives the impression they are having an affair. Vas explained that "whatever Mishti’s secret is, it’s complicated and it has the potential to cause problems within the family." She added that Mishti definitely wants Shane to keep her secret from other characters in the show. In addition Neighbours wanted to keep viewers guessing at what her secret could be. Mishti and Leo later argue when she discovers that he has been sabotaging his half-sister Amy Williams' (Zoe Cramond) relationship with Nick Petrides (Damien Fotiou). Their row esculates when Mishti is distracted and backs her car into Tyler Brennan (Travis Burns) and runs him over. The scenes were written into the episode to bring back "painful memories" for Mishti involving a past car accident.

=== Relationship with Leo Tanaka ===
Leo and Mishti equals Flirtation Nation from the very first day they met. [...] While their friendship has developed, so has the length of the longing looks they give one another, as soon as one of them turns the other way. The chemistry between them is explosive, even when they’re fighting. And while we’ve only seen Mishti crack under pressure once, it didn’t go unnoticed by Leo, who often reveals a softer, more caring side when around the tough former police officer.

— A reporter from the official Neighbours website assesses the early stages of their relationship.

Since her inception Mishti shared many of her scenes with Leo, from which producers began developing a romantic relationship. Initially their bond takes a while to form. After befriending each other Mishti's reluctance to discuss her past causes problems. Vas told James from Soaplife that "Mishti starts dropping her guard and she begins to confide in him." Leo, a character who had previously been portrayed as ruthless, began showing a caring side towards Mishti. Writers would continue to have the duo stuck contemplating a relationship but ultimately remain friends. Producers finally decided to unite the pair in September 2017. When Amy wants Leo to sell his share of the Robinsons hotel she concocts a plan to get him and Mishti together. She assumes that Mishti will be able to convince Leo to sell. Mishti is unaware of Amy's true intentions and thinks she is matchmaking. Leo is furious when he finds out Amy's deceit and presumes Mishti is part of the scam. But Mishti later convinces him of her innocence and they decide to begin a relationship. Their romance faces early issues when Leo kisses Courtney Grixti (Emma Lane) and Mishti witnesses the moment. Courtney is engaged to Leo's father, Paul Robinson (Stefan Dennis) and he wants to see if she will be unfaithful. Mishti later forgives Leo when he explains he wanted to ensure Courtney was committed to his father and not after money.

More problems followed focusing on the issue of trust. Mishti becomes secretive over her rogue investigation into the death of Hamish Roche (Sean Taylor). She lies about her whereabouts. But Mishti installed a tracking app on his telephone device, as a kind gesture to follow each other. Leo uses the app to track down Mishti and discovers she is lying. This caused Leo to believe he can no longer trust Mishti and they nearly break-up. Another issue arises when Leo's friend Elly Conway (Jodi Anasta) gets drunks and kisses Leo. The moment is witnessed by Dipi who informs Mishti, leading her to believe they were seeing each other. Mishti is forced to re-assume her role as peacemaker when Dipi and Leo begin arguing. Dipi believes that Leo has ill-advised her husband Shane over a business deal. She accusess him of plotting to secure a free urine powered generator Shane has invented. This is not true and Mishti is left with the task of solving their rift. They continue to bicker and fall into a swimming pool at a family barbecue.

In March 2018, Neighbours confirmed a new pregnancy story featuring Mishti and Leo. Leo is hurt at the Robinson Heights development site. A slab of broken concrete falls on top of him and leaves him trapped. Mishti is called out to the incident and is shocked to find Leo. Vas told Ellis (Inside Soap) that Mishti is worried and can only reassure her boyfriend. But he is taken to hospital and recovers. The events lead Mishti to reveal her pregnancy. Vas explained that Mishti and Leo's relationship is still new, so she is unsure of how he will react. They had not thought about having children so are unsure about keeping it. But their families discover their news and are excited. The actress added "she and Leo aren't even sure they want to have the baby yet - but they're forced to go along with the family's celebrations." But Vas told Sally Brockway from Soaplife that Dipi's advice and support actually helps Mishti accept her pregnancy. Dipi's encouragement about being a mother makes Mishti "feel like she can do it because Dipi is an amazing mum to her three children." Mishti's next problem is telling Leo's father Paul as she fears his disapproval. To her surprise he is supportive. Vas added that Mishti thinks everything will be okay once Paul accepts the news. But she warned of many "twists and turns" for her relationship with Leo. It was later announced that Mishti would lose her unborn child in a miscarriage story.

Mishti and Leo argue about his new role at Lassiters hotel and she experiences pains. When she is taken to hospital she is told that she has suffered a miscarriage. A reporter from Soaplife revealed that Mishti's loss would "utterly devastated" but ultimately bring Mishti and Leo closer together. Their resilience is short-lived when Mishti's friend Monique Hughes (Madeleine Vizard) visits and ruins their relationship. She was a colleague at the police academy Mishti and Zander attended. Monique discovers that Lassiter's has sold alcohol to a minor and blackmails him for money in exchange for her silence.

=== Dilhan Ozdil feud ===
Writers planned a revenge porn story for Mishti which began in June 2018. Rory O'Connor from the Daily Express reported that the story would leave a "trail of devastation" for the character. When Mishti attends a night out drinking with her friends she decides to have casual sex with Dilhan Ozdil (Kyle Hazebroek). She takes Dilhan back to her home and is unaware he intends to rob her. Vas told Maddison Hockey from TV Week that Mishti's reasons for her care-free behaviour is due to her need to move on from her miscarriage. She is initially "hesitant" but her friend Chloe Brennan (April Rose Pengilly) convinces her to have fun. Following their encounter Dilhan sneaks out of the bedroom to steal money, but Xanthe Canning (Lilly Van der Meer) disturbs him. Mishti is shocked and left questioning her behaviour but decides that she must track Dilhan down to arrest him. Then Mishti receives text messages revealing that he recorded them having sex and will upload it online if she does not drop the charges.

Mishti ignores his threats and enlists the help of Aaron to retrieve the footage from Dilhan, which is unsuccessful and it is shared online. Mishti is left humiliated and feels ashamed when a stranger recognises her and makes a lewd remark. Mishti feels more positive when Dilhan is arrested but his family secure his bail and he is released. Vas told from Hockey that Mishti wants to move on but Dilhan receiving bail hinders that. She explained that Mishti "just feels defeated, she's very angry with the whole situation." Leo becomes concerned and decides to try and trick Dilhan into breaking his bail conditions. He tries to cause a fight but when Dilhan goads him, Leo ends up punching Ned Willis (Ben Hall) instead. Dilhan continues to harass Mishti and sends her a series of threatening text messages. She worries her friends because of her reluctance to report the abuse. He threatens to visit her home and Mishti hears an intruder in her garden. Mishti is alarmed and recklessly withdraws her gun and fires a warning shot out of the door, which jeopardises her police career.

=== Departure ===
On 8 October 2018, Daniel Kilkelly of Digital Spy confirmed that the character would be departing the serial the following week. Mishti decides to leave Erinsborough to join her fiancé Pavan Nahal (Akkshey Caplash) in Sydney. Mishti's exit scenes aired on 19 October. The following day, Vas posted a message about her departure on Instagram saying she "loved portraying every minute" of Mishti. She added, "Thankyou [sic] to all the amazing viewers during my time on @neighbours.. To all my Mishti fans, your love and support means the world to me and I can't wait for you all to come with me on my journey in the next stage of my career...."

== Storylines ==
Mishti comes to Harold's Café in Erinsborough to talk to Shane Rebecchi about whether his brother Toadfish Rebecchi (Ryan Moloney) can help them. Mishti then tells Shane that she might have found a way to solve their problem. Shane later tells Mishti that he is thinking of moving to Erinsborough, as he and his wife Dipi need a fresh start. She asks Shane if he has told Toadie everything, but he says he is planning to. Mishti stays at the Erinsborough Backpackers and flirts with Leo. They agree that neither of them want a serious relationship. Mishti surprises Dipi when she and her daughters finally arrive in Erinsborough. Mishti helps an injured Piper Willis (Mavournee Hazel) when a ute crashes into the backpackers hostel. She continues to stay involved in the investigation and drives Tyler to the city, so he can question T-Bone (Des Flanagan). When Tyler assaults T-Bone, Mishti reports him to the police and it emerges that she is a former police officer. Shane admits to Dipi that Mishti gave him a loan, as he lost a lot of money trying to get his solar-powered lawnmower to work. Mishti also reveals that she followed Shane to Erinsborough to help out and get away from her old life.

Mishti befriends Aaron and they buy a local gym together. While arguing with Leo, Mishti gets into her car and reverses into Tyler. She briefly goes into shock, while Tyler is left with severe bruising. Mishti reveals to Leo that she was once engaged to a fellow police officer named Zander, who was run down and killed during an RBT patrol, and the driver responsible escaped justice. Shane later tells Dipi that shortly after Zander's death, he found Mishti smashing up the house and threatening to get justice for Zander. He stopped her from leaving with her service weapon, and she decided to quit the force. Mishti tells Dipi that the accident with Tyler reminded her of Zander. She starts a relationship with Leo. She finds Leo with Courtney and suspects he was cheating on her and runs off. Leo finds her and assures her that he was only trying to find out if Courtney was truly committed to her relationship with his dad, Paul. She is suspicious in the whereabouts of Gary and his mother Sheila Canning (Colette Mann) on the night of Hamish's death and investigates. Impressing the sergeant she is then offered to return to a job in the police force and accepts. Mishti tells Aaron that she will no longer be working with him at The Shed. Mishti investigates Paul's interference with hotel records, but is ordered to stop. She arrests Shane following a drunken public disturbance on Ramsay Street and puts him in a cell to sober up. Dipi is angry with Mishti arresting her own family, but she later forgives her sister.

While on duty, Mishti receives a radio call indicating that an accident occurred at the Robinson Heights housing development site. Mishti arrives to find Leo being treated by paramedics after being crushed by a concrete slab. After Leo is given the all clear, Mishti tells him she is pregnant. Kirsha hears about Mishti's pregnancy and tells her family. Mishti experiences pains and miscarries her baby. She and Leo agree that it was too soon to start a family and move on. Mishti's former colleague Monique Hughes (Madeleine Vizard) visits and they reminisce about their time working with Zander. Monique discovers that Lassiters have illegally sold alcohol to Xanthe and she tries to blackmail Leo in exchange for her silence. This causes Leo to hire a private investigator and he discovers that Monique and Zander had been involved with illegal gangs. Leo informs Mishti who is devastated that her boyfriend, best friend and ex-fiancé have all lied to her. She realises she can no longer trust anyone and ends her relationship with Leo. Mishti has a one-night stand with Dilhan Ozdil and he steals money from her purse. Dilhan threatens to upload footage of them having sex to the internet if she does not drop the theft charges. Aaron helps Mishti retrieve the footage and she arrests Dilhan. He is granted bail and makes the footage public. Mishti delivers a talk at Erinsborough High about the emotional impact of revenge porn. She tries to move on, but Dilhan starts sending her abusive text messages.

When she is home alone Dilhan's texts make her feel unsafe. Chloe creeps into Mishti's back garden to check-up on her, Mishti withdraws her gun and discharges a warning shot. Mishti is overcome with guilt and reports herself to the police, who decide not to take any legal action and request that she retakes her weapon training. Mishti sells her half of The Shed to Paul. After an unsuccessful date with Rob Carson (Christopher Farrell), Mishti joins an arranged marriage website, where she meets Sydney dentist Pavan Nahal. After opening up about their pasts, Mishti and Pavan become engaged. Mishti agrees to help Mark Brennan (Scott McGregor) search for Monique and contacts her. Monique has Dilhan beaten up, before meeting with Mishti. Monique realises she is being set up and Mishti arrests her. At the station, Mishti learns that she is compromised an investigation and is suspended. Pavan calls of the engagement when he learns about the sex tape and Mishti accuses Dipi of telling him about it. Dipi later intervenes and speaks to Pavan. She learns that Monique sent the video, and that he was angry that Mishti did not tell him about it. Pavan comes to see Mishti and they reconcile. When he receives a job offer in Sydney, Mishti decides to leave Erinsborough to be with him. Dipi organises a farewell party for her before she departs.

== Reception ==
Di Hollingsworth from What's on TV branded Mishti a "stunningly beautiful and superfit" character. She added "it's been clear from the off she’s hiding something." Claire Crick from Soaplife said "Leo Tanaka and Mishti Sharma are certainly something of a power couple. Not only are they both massively successful in their beloved jobs, but they also make a beautiful pairing to boot." Another branded her "mysterious Mishti Sharma". Sasha Morris from the Daily Star has called the character a "brunette bombshell" and "peacemaker", adding "Mishti cemented her position as Neighbours' latest hottie." Responding to the viewers incorrect theories Mishti is Dipi's secret daughter, Morris said "that would be the mother of all plot twists." Helen Daly from the Daily Express named her "the new cop on the block", "mysterious new character" and said she was "like every police officer that's come before her" for mistrusting Paul. Upon learning Mishti's secret past, a Liverpool Echo writer stated "they're the stuff on which soaps are so often built, so it should come as no surprise to learn than Mishti has one – and it's a whopper, too."
