= List of Neighbours characters introduced in 2017 =

Characters in Australian soap opera 2017

Neighbours is an Australian television soap opera. It was first broadcast on 18 March 1985 and currently airs on digital channel Eleven. The following is a list of characters that appeared in the show in 2017, by order of first appearance. All characters are introduced by the shows executive producer Jason Herbison. The 33rd season of Neighbours began airing from 9 January 2017. Andrea and Willow Somers made their debuts during the same month. Teacher Finn Kelly was introduced during March, while Dipi, Kirsha and Yashvi Rebecchi, along with Dipi's sister Mishti Sharma, arrived in April. Jeremy Newell and Mannix Foster appeared in June. Evan Lewis and Fay Brennan were introduced during the following month. September saw the first appearance of Hamish Roche, while Cassius Grady (uncredited until May 2018) and Rory Zemiro made their debuts in November. Joanne Schwartz appeared in December.

== Andrea Somers ==
Andrea Somers, played by Madeleine West, made her first appearance on 20 January 2017. West previously played Dee Bliss, who was presumed dead in 2003 when her husband Toadfish Rebecchi (Ryan Moloney) accidentally crashed their car into the sea. On 15 September 2016, Tiffany Dunk of News.com.au reported that West had reprised the role of Dee. West returned to filming that same week. However, during the episode broadcast on 2 February 2017, it was revealed that Dee was actually an impostor named Andrea Somers. Andrea is impersonating Dee to gain money from the Bliss family estate. She also includes her daughter Willow Somers (Mieke Billing-Smith) in the scam, by pretending that she is Toadie's daughter. Five months after Andrea's exit, West made a surprise return to the show on 14 August 2017. Her appearance was not announced beforehand and the closing credits stated it was a "Special appearance by Madeleine West", leading viewers to speculate that it was the real Dee and not Andrea. West later appeared during the season finale on 8 December 2017. Her character was seen watching Toadie's vow renewal from a taxi. Her character name was again withheld. She was seen again during the return episode on 8 January 2018. It was later confirmed on-screen that Andrea had been in Erinsborough to check up on Toadie, and Daniel Kilkelly of Digital Spy believed Andrea was the woman in the taxi. A set of flashbacks broadcast on 27 June 2018 showed Andrea had fallen pregnant after having sex with Toadie. She later fled town leaving her son Hugo Somers (John Turner) with Sindi Watts (Marisa Warrington). As Andrea and the real Dee Bliss came face-to-face in July 2019, West revealed that they are twins, who were separated at birth.

== Jasmine Udagawa ==
Jasmine Udagawa
- Neighbours character
- Portrayed by: Kaori Maeda-Judge
- First appearance: 26 January 2017
- Last appearance: 25 August 2017
- Introduced by: Jason Herbison
In-universe information
- Occupation: Businesswoman
- Father: Hiroshi Udagawa
- Brothers: James Udagawa (step)
- Grandfathers: Toshiro Udagawa

Jasmine Udagawa, played by Kaori Maeda-Judge, made her first appearance on 26 January 2017. Maeda-Judge joined the show's cast on a recurring basis, and on-screen Jasmine challenges business rival Paul Robinson (Stefan Dennis). Jasmine soon becomes involved in the mystery story surrounding the paternity of David Tanaka (Takaya Honda) and Leo Tanaka (Tim Kano). Jasmine shifts her attention from Paul to Leo, who she believes is related to her. Not wanting him to inherit Lassiter's she concocts a plan to sabotage his backpackers business and force him to leave Erinsborough. Terese Willis (Rebekah Elmaloglou) soon becomes suspicious of Jasmine's vendetta against Leo and snoops in a secret file and is shocked to learn he could potentially gain control of Lassiter's. Discussing Jasmine's ruthless plan to run Leo out of Erinsborohough, Daniel Kilkelly from Digital Spy said that "talk about a u-turn! [...] she certainly doesn't mess about." He added that the "very intriguing" story would progress with Amy Williams (Zoe Cramond) discovering the truth about Jasmine's file on Leo. It soon became clear that Jasmine's theories were incorrect.

Terese sees Jasmine working with her investor James Udagawa (Samuel David Humphrey) and mistakes her for his new assistant. Jasmine introduces herself as James's sister, before leaving to look around the Lassiter's complex. James explains that Jasmine has convinced their dying grandfather that she needs to step in and he warns Terese to watch her, as he is being relocated. Jasmine returns and has some questions for Terese after going through the books. A couple of weeks later, Jasmine brings her grandfather. Toshiro Udagawa (Lawrence Mah), to see an exhibition at Lassiter's Hotel and reacts to the mention of Leo name. Terese raises the moment with Jasmine, who decides to look into it. She asks Terese to continue to bring down Paul's business, but later changes her mind and tells Terese to drive Leo and his business out of Erinsborough.

Terese becomes suspicious of Jasmine's intentions and reads her secret file on him. Jasmine warns Terese that Leo could inherit the hotel. Amy overhears their exchange and decides to investigate. Jasmine tries to bribe Leo with money which leads him to suspect that they are related. When Jasmine confronts Toshiro, he contacts Kim Tanaka (Jenny Young) who is forced to reveal that her sons are not related to the Udagawas and that they are actually Paul's biological children. Later, Jasmine begins suspecting that something is wrong with Terese and eventually discovers that she has been diagnosed with breast cancer. Jasmine informs Terese that the Udagawa board has decided to pull their investment out of Lassiter's.

== Willow Somers ==
Willow Somers
- Neighbours character
- Portrayed by: Mieke Billing-Smith
- Duration: 2017–2019
- First appearance: 31 January 2017
- Last appearance: 1 August 2019
- Introduced by: Jason Herbison
In-universe information
- Other names: Willow Bliss
- Occupation: Student; Garden nursery assistant
- Father: Fergus Olsen
- Mother: Andrea Somers
- Stepmother: Astrid
- Half-brothers: Hugo Somers
- Half-sisters: 2
- Grandfathers: Peter Wilson
- Grandmothers: Heather Schilling
- Aunts: Dee Bliss

Willow Somers, played by Mieke Billing-Smith, made her first appearance on 31 January 2017. Billing-Smith's casting and her character details were announced on 23 January. Willow was introduced as the teenage daughter of Andrea Somers (Madeleine West), posing as Dee Bliss, who tells Toadfish Rebecchi (Ryan Moloney) that Willow is his daughter. Daniel Kilkelly of Digital Spy praised Billing-Smith for her role in the Andrea/Toadie storyline, saying she had been "a great discovery for the show". He also hoped Willow would return, especially as the show had a history of character's taking in "random waifs and strays". Executive producer Jason Herbison stated that he loved the character, and explained, "It's always a great dynamic when you have a child who's forced to parent an adult. She really was a leaf blown about in the breeze created by Andrea. I thought Mieke did a terrific job." He added that there was a chance Willow could return in the future. It was later confirmed that the character would be returning on 11 July. Willow departed again on 4 August, after deciding to live with her father Fergus Olsen (Andrew Percy), before making a guest appearance from 8 December for Toadie and Sonya Rebecchi's (Eve Morey) vow renewal. Billing-Smith reprised her role for another guest stint as Willow from 10 June 2019.

Willow's mother Andrea brings her to Erinsborough when she decides to scam Toadfish Rebecchi by posing as his deceased wife Dee Bliss. When Toadie finds Willow in Andrea's motel room, Andrea tells him Willow is his daughter. Willow is forced to go along with her mother's plan and she spends time with Toadie. They bond over her desire to become a pilot and he helps her get into a private school. Willow becomes involved in a fake ID scheme with Piper Willis (Mavournee Hazel), and tries to blackmail Elly Conway (Jodi Anasta) with a photoshopped picture of Elly in bed with student Angus Beaumont-Hannay (Jai Waetford). After Willow and Andrea flee to London, Toadie is able to use Willow's social media to track them down. After Toadie discovers Andrea's real identity, Willow tries to talk to him, but he walks into the road and is struck by a taxi. Willow visits him in the hospital. She also tries, unsuccessfully, to convince her mother to give back the $100,000.

Months later, Willow returns to Erinsborough and tidies up Sonya Rebecchi's garden nursery following a storm. Sonya later catches Willow outside her home and Willow sprains her wrist when she falls. Sonya takes her to the hospital, where Toadie meets them. Willow explains that she ran away from Andrea, after they failed to find her real father and Andrea lied about repaying Toadie. As Willow cannot support herself, Toadie decides that she can stay with him instead of going into care. Sonya gives Willow a job at the nursery. Toadie later decides that he and Willow should move into one of the Eclipse apartments at Lassiter's, as Number 32 is too crowded. Willow learns that her father, Fergus Olsen (Andrew Percy), is living in Port Macquarie and she decides she wants to meet him. Fergus comes to Erinsborough to meet Willow. He tells her how a swimming accident that left him paralysed helped him change his life around. He is married and has two young daughters. After spending some time with him, Fergus invites Willow to stay with him and his family. Willow weighs up the pros and cons of going to Port Macquarie, and eventually decides to go. Toadie decides to go with her to see her settle in. She tells Ben during her farewell party that she always thought something romantic would happen between them, and he agrees, but he was taking his time. Willow visits Sonya and Nell to say goodbye. She tells Sonya that if she wants Toadie back, not to take too long as Amy Williams (Zoe Cramond) has feelings for him. Willow returns to Erinsborough on Christmas Day to act as a bridesmaid at Sonya's surprise vow renewal for Toadie.

Toadie contacts Willow to let her know that he has Andrea's phone number, and she advises him to throw it away. Willow then tells Sindi Watts (Marisa Warrington) that she does not want to see Andrea, although she has been in contact. She also explains that there is something that Toadie and Sonya do not know about Andrea. Months later, Toadie informs Willow that a private detective has found Andrea in Perth. Willow flies to Erinsborough and asks that he and Sonya do not contact her. They explain that they need to try, as they want to get their money back. Willow's secret is revealed when Sindi abruptly arrives with Andrea and Toadie's baby son, Hugo Somers (John Turner). She explains that a heavily pregnant Andrea returned to Erinsborough on the day of the vow renewal, and Willow persuaded her to stay away from the Rebecchis. Toadie and Sonya assume custody of Hugo in Andrea's absence, and eventually track her down to a psychiatric facility in Tasmania. Willow accompanies them to visit her mother, who believes she is Dee Bliss and does not remember either of her children. Months later, Willow returns to Erinsborough and finds that her grandmother, Heather Schilling (Kerry Armstrong), is posing as "Alice Wells", the Rebecchis' nanny. Willow tricks Heather into revealing she has poisoned Sonya and left her to die. She warns Toadie and they rescue Sonya in time. Willow is devastated by how her family has hurt the Rebecchis again, but Toadie insists she is part of their family and should not feel guilty for her mother and grandmother's actions. The following year, Sonya dies of ovarian cancer and Willow returns for her memorial.

Months later, Willow returns to Erinsborough when she hears Andrea has made contact with Toadie, wanting to reconnect with Hugo. She decides to stay for a while to make sure Andrea is not trying to con Toadie again. However, it later emerges that Dee Bliss is alive and Andrea and Heather try to track her down. However, Andrea pushes Dee off a cliff, assumes her identity again, and returns to Ramsay Street to con Toadie. However, Heather and Dee later arrive in Ramsay Street and Willow rushes inside Number 30 where she is unable to tell the difference between Andrea, who pretends not to know her and Dee. When Dee prevails, Andrea attempts to flee, but Willow tackles her to the floor, and she is arrested and hospitalised for broken ribs. Willow then visits Andrea in hospital and returns to Port Macquarie after disowning her. She later speaks to Dee through Skype after it is revealed she is Andrea's twin sister. When Dee returns to visit Andrea and Heather in prison the following year, she reveals that Willow has passed her final school examination and has commenced pilot training.

== Finn Kelly ==
Finn Kelly, played by Rob Mills, made his first screen appearance on 15 March 2017. The casting and character details were officially announced on 15 November 2016. Luke Dennehy of the Herald Sun reported that Mills had begun filming his first scenes during the same week. Finn is "a progressive and respected school teacher", who joins the staff of Erinsborough High after being hired by Susan Kennedy (Jackie Woodburne). Finn was also introduced as Elly Conway's (Jodi Anasta) former boyfriend. Executive producer Jason Herbison called Finn "a really intriguing character" with some unexpected secrets. Following his guest stint, Johnathon Hughes of Radio Times branded Finn "one of the nastiest characters Neighbours has ever seen." Mills reprised the role in 2018, and he was promoted the regular cast in 2019.

== Mishti Sharma ==
Mishti Sharma, played by Scarlet Vas, made her first appearance on 18 April 2017. The character and casting details were announced on 27 March. Mishti is Dipi Rebecchi's (Sharon Johal) sister. She arrives in Erinsborough with Dipi's husband Shane Rebecchi (Nicholas Coghlan). Coghlan explained that Mishti helps her brother-in-law when he considers moving to the area. The actor also described Mishti as "a dear friend" to Shane and said the two characters "share some pretty serious confidences." Mishti comes to Erinsborough wanting a fresh start. However, Daniel Kilkelly of Digital Spy thought she had a dark secret, noting "there's also an air of sadness about her."

== Dipi Rebecchi ==
Dipi Rebecchi, played by Sharon Johal, made her first appearance on 24 April 2017. The character and casting details were announced on 27 March. Johal originally auditioned for the role of Dipi's sister Mishti Sharma, but the character's age was lowered and Scarlet Vas was cast. The producers liked Johal, so they decided to make Dipi work for her. Dipi is the wife of Shane Rebecchi (Nicholas Coghlan), the older brother of established regular Toadfish Rebecchi (Ryan Moloney), who returns to Erinsborough with his new family after 22 years. Dipi and Shane move to Erinsborough with their two daughters Yashvi (Olivia Junkeer) and Kirsha Rebecchi (Vani Dhir). The character was billed as "a ray of sunshine to those around her. Enthusiastic, bubbly and having an infectious lust for life, she always sees the best in people." Dipi takes over the lease of Harold Café.

== Kirsha Rebecchi ==
Kirsha Rebecchi
- Neighbours character
- Portrayed by: Vani Dhir
- Duration: 2017–2020
- First appearance: 24 April 2017
- Last appearance: 28 December 2020
- Introduced by: Jason Herbison
In-universe information
- Occupation: Student; Waitress
- Father: Shane Rebecchi
- Mother: Dipi Rebecchi
- Brothers: Jay Rebecchi
- Sisters: Yashvi Rebecchi
- Grandmothers: Angie Rebecchi
- Uncles: Toadie Rebecchi
- Aunts: Mishti Sharma
- First cousins: Callum Rebecchi; Nell Rebecchi; Hugo Somers

Kirsha Rebecchi, played by Vani Dhir, made her first appearance on 24 April 2017. The character and casting details were announced on 27 March. Dhir received the audition for the role through her stage school Young Australian Broadway Chorus. Of her casting, Dhir commented "I was happy and thrilled to get this role as I am now doing what I love and enjoying every bit of it. I wish I could be filming everyday but I have to go to school." When she is on set, Dhir films her scenes in a couple of hours, so she can keep up with her schooling. Kirsha is Shane (Nicholas Coghlan) and Dipi Rebecchi's (Sharon Johal) younger daughter. She is intelligent and enjoys reading. Kirsha is also shy and finds the move to Erinsborough terrifying, as she questions whether she will be accepted. Dhir told Preeti Jabbal of Indian Link that she is the opposite of the "anxious and nerdy" Kirsha. Dhir departed the serial on 22 November 2019, as Kirsha moves to Sydney for a scholarship. She later returned for guest stints on 30 December 2019, 29 June 2020, and 4 December 2020.

Kirsha arrives in Erinsborough with her mother Dipi and older sister Yashvi Rebecchi (Olivia Junkeer). Her father, Shane, reveals that he has rented Number 32 Ramsay Street for the family, and has bought Harold's Café for Dipi. Dipi bakes Anzac Biscuits and asks Kirsha and Yashvi to give them out to the community. Kirsha struggles with the move, but befriends Jimmy Williams (Darcy Tadich). Shane later buys back Kirsha's dog Clancy to cheer her up. Dipi, Kirsha and her aunt Mishti Sharma (Scarlet Vas) show Aaron Brennan (Matt Wilson) Shane's solar-powered lawnmower in the hope he can help them sell it to an investor. They take it out to show Aaron what it can do, but Kirsha accidentally drives it into the lake. Kirsha is paired with Tia Martinez (Erica Brown) for a school assignment, and Tia later invites her to a sleepover, which Kirsha does not want to attend. Dipi encourages her to go and Kirsha eventually agrees. However, she goes missing after Dipi drops her off at Tia's house. She is found the following morning sleeping in the garden bar. Kirsha tells her parents that she does not feel like she belongs in Erinsborough. Tia later forces Kirsha to steal Elly Conway's (Jodi Anasta) clothes, while she is showering at the school. Ben Kirk (Felix Mallard) teaches Kirsha how to play the guitar, and she joins him in a couple of public performances. Kirsha accidentally drops a lit sparkler into a box of Yashvi's fireworks, which go off and result in Kirsha suffering minor burns to her face and hearing loss, caused by nerve damage. She is given a course of steroids to help her recovery, which makes her anxiety worse. Yashvi apologises to Kirsha, but Kirsha says that it was an accident and no ones fault.

Kirsha fails a hearing test, and learns that her hearing is unlikely to improve. She begins learning sign language with Yashvi and Shane's help. Shane saves Kirsha from being struck by Jimmy's bike, but he is injured and cannot accompany her to a Deaf Children Australia event, which knocks her confidence. Tia and her friends bully Kirsha about her signing, and later a period stain on her dress. Xanthe Canning (Lilly Van der Meer) stands up to them and helps Kirsha clean up. Tia continues to bully Kirsha by putting chewing gum in her hair and throwing sweets at her. Kirsha's hearing returns and she overhears Mishti telling Leo that she is pregnant, and she tells the family. Jimmy admits to Kirsha that he has a crush on Poppy Ryan (Eloise Ross), so she helps him talk to her and they begin dating. Poppy later tells Kirsha to stop being a third wheel when Jimmy invites her to join them. Poppy continues to be mean to Kirsha when they attend school camp together, until Yashvi warns her to back off. After stopping to rest during a hike, Kirsha and her teacher Susan Kennedy (Jackie Woodburne) become lost in the bush for a night. They are eventually found by Yashvi and led back to the camp. A few weeks later, Jimmy informs Kirsha that he is moving to New York with his father, causing Kirsha to panic about how she will survive school without him. The Rebecchis take part in a photoshoot for the Face of Lassiters campaign and posters are made for the complex. When the posters are vandalised, Kirsha admits to Shane that she did it, as she thought the family might be let go from the campaign and she would not be bullied again. When she learns that Marisa Taylor (Shannon Barker) has been accused and let go from her job at the hotel, Kirsha tells her the truth, leading Marisa to blackmail her. Kirsha eventually tells Shane about the blackmail and he promises to sort it out, but Marisa records him confronting her and the family are dropped as the Faces of Lassiters.

Kirsha is one of a handful of students who are poisoned by hydrogen cyanide gas planted in the school by Finn Kelly (Rob Mills). She is also held hostage by Raymond Renshaw (Frank Magree) in the café and calls the police to alert them of his presence. Kirsha and her family move in with her uncle Toadfish Rebecchi (Ryan Moloney), after their house is sold. When Angela Lane (Amanda Harrison) calls for Elly to resign, Kirsha and Angela's daughter Lacy Lane (Sophie Hardy) create a petition to keep Elly at the school, which helps change Angela's mind. Kirsha helps Toadie with his accounts and confesses that she has been feeling overlooked recently. Toadie encourages her to speak up about what she wants and Kirsha tells her parents that she wants to apply for a scholarship at a school in Sydney. Both Dipi and Shane think it is too soon for her to leave home, citing her anxiety as an issue. Elly gives Toadie Kirsha's video essay, which he watches along with Shane and Dipi. While they refuse to change their minds, Toadie writes Kirsha a letter of recommendation and tells her to submit her application. Toadie and Shane fall out as a result, but soon reconcile. Kirsha learns that she has been accepted into the school, and Shane and Dipi decide to let Kirsha go. Kirsha says goodbye to Clancy and Yashvi, before telling her parents that she wants to go to Sydney alone to prove that she is independent. She arranges for Elly to drive her to the airport and for Mishti to pick her up. She says goodbye to Dipi and Shane in the street, promising to video call them all the time. Kirsha briefly returns to spend New Year with her family. Months later, Kirsha returns for Yashvi's graduation ceremony from the police academy, before she goes to science camp.

== Yashvi Rebecchi ==
Yashvi Rebecchi, played by Olivia Junkeer, made her first appearance on 24 April 2017. The character and casting details were announced on 27 March 2017. Yashvi is Shane (Nicholas Coghlan) and Dipi Rebecchi's (Sharon Johal) older daughter. She was described as being "a boisterous troublemaker who's fearless and confident." Yashvi likes to try tricks and jokes out on new people, and enjoys being the centre of attention. She is more of an "opportunist" than a "bad girl". On 5 July 2021, Junkeer confirmed her departure from Neighbours after four and a half years. She cited her on-screen family's departure and a desire "to experience something different" as her reasons for leaving. Her exit scenes aired the following week.

== Jeremy Newell ==
Jeremy "Jezza" Newell, played by Robbie Ryde, made his first appearance on 22 June 2017. The character and Ryde's casting details were announced on 8 June. Ryde previously appeared in the show as an extra. Jeremy is a carpenter, who appears in party scenes with fellow carpenter Amy Williams (Zoe Cramond). Of Jeremy, Ryde commented "My character is an antagonist, he's not a nice guy. It's always a challenge to play someone with different beliefs than yourself, but that is acting."

Jeremy attends Amy Williams' house warming at the Lassiter's Penthouse. He sees David Tanaka (Takaya Honda) and Tom Quill (Kane Felsinger) kissing. David later tries to make small talk with Jeremy, who replies with homophobic comments. He tells Amy that she should not be raising her young son Jimmy Williams (Darcy Tadich) around David. Amy become offended by his words and she tells him to leave the party, threatening to throw him off the balcony. He then leaves the party.

== Mannix Foster ==
Mannix Foster
- Neighbours character
- Portrayed by: Sam Webb
- Duration: 2017–2020
- First appearance: 26 June 2017
- Last appearance: 15 April 2020
- Introduced by: Jason Herbison
In-universe information
- Other names: Richard

Mannix Foster, played by Sam Webb, made his first appearance on 26 June 2017. Webb's guest stint was confirmed by Herald Sun reporters in March 2017. Of his casting, Webb stated "I auditioned, like everyone else, and got the part. I was a bit nervous but it's been amazing so far." He revealed that his character "stirs up a bit of trouble". Mannix is introduced as a friend of Leo Tanaka (Tim Kano). Daniel Kilkelly of Digital Spy described Mannix as "a troublesome face from his past". Mannix has been wrongly accused of being a snitch and comes to Leo for help after he is stabbed. Leo asks his brother David Tanaka (Takaya Honda) to treat Mannix and reveals that he was actually responsible for telling the police about a nightclub's "dodgy practices". Mannix disappears from town after being threatened by Leo's father Paul Robinson (Stefan Dennis). Conor McMullan of Digital Spy thought the conclusion to the storyline "seemed a little too easy" and said "would someone like Mannix really be scared that easily when he holds all the cards?" Mannix made a cameo appearance on 18 December 2018 in a flashback sequence, and made another appearance from 17 January 2019. Webb reprised the role in March 2020, as Mannix is revealed to have scammed Paul's friend Jane Harris (Annie Jones).

Leo Tanaka organises a room for his friend Mannix at Robinsons motel. The motel's co-owner Stephanie Scully (Carla Bonner) becomes suspicious of him, after seeing people enter and leave his room. She also finds a bag of money in his room and Paul Robinson tells Leo that Mannix needs to leave by the end of the week. Steph later questions Mannix about his check out time. Mannix meets Elly Conway (Jodi Anasta) in Lassiter's Complex and she recognises him from the Sydney clubbing scene. She agrees to go for a drink with him to catch up. Mannix locks himself in his motel room and asks to see Leo. He reveals that he has been stabbed and Leo gets his brother David to treat him. Paul tells Leo that Mannix needs to leave, so Leo takes him to the backpackers' hostel, making his wound worse. Leo explains to David that he informed on the Renshaws, who were laundering money through a nightclub, but Mannix got the blame and that is likely the reason why he got stabbed. Mannix's condition worsens and David steals some morphine from the hospital to treat him.

Paul later shows up and tells Mannix that he will see to it that he never has a reason to return to Erinsborough. Paul later explains that he got a couple of men to threaten Mannix, before he was taken to a regional hospital and admitted under a false name. The following year, Paul tells Leo that he actually left Mannix in the middle of nowhere. When he sent an associate to check on him, Mannix was gone, so Paul assumed that he made his way to the nearest town. Delaney Renshaw (Ella Newton) later tells Paul that Mannix died as a result of his actions. However, Leo discovers this is a lie when he goes to meet up with Delaney's mystery contact and comes face-to-face with Mannix. He brings Mannix to Paul and Mannix explains that he called Delaney after Paul left him and he recovered in a nearby motel, before going to Indonesia. Mannix then admits to telling Delaney's father that it was Leo who went to the police about the money laundering. Mannix attempts to blackmail David by threatening to reveal that he stole medication from the hospital to help him, but David goes to the hospital board himself. After Paul tells him David went to the police, Mannix leaves town.

To get back at Paul, Mannix catfishes his friend Jane Harris and cons her out of her savings. Paul learns Mannix is behind the con and tells him to pay back the money, but Mannix tells him that he has already spent it on a car. When Paul says he will go to the police, Mannix threatens to publicly reveal the messages he and Jane exchanged and Paul realises he was planning on extorting more money from Jane. He tells Mannix to sell the car and start working for him, as he will make up the difference to pay Jane back. Jane later arranges to meet Mannix to understand why he conned her. She admits that she really connected with him and he hurt her more than anyone else. Mannix tries to tempt Jane into giving him a second chance, but she rejects him and says Paul will put him through hell. Weeks later, Mannix moves in with Mackenzie Hargreaves (Georgie Stone), who needs a flatmate to share the rent and utility bills. They get on well, but Mannix asks Mackenzie not to go in his room and he later puts a lock on the door. Mannix is wary of visitors to the house and tells Mackenzie that she should let him know if anyone is coming over. The police raid the apartment with Mackenzie and Harlow Robinson (Jemma Donovan) inside, but Mannix escapes, and turns up at Paul's house. He offers Paul some stolen electronics in lieu of the money he owes, but Paul refuses and tells him to forget the debt. As Mannix is leaving, Harlow spots him and he is tackled to the ground by her boyfriend Hendrix Greyson (Benny Turland). Mannix is arrested and he tells the police that he was scoping out houses to steal from.

== Evan Lewis ==
Evan Lewis
- Neighbours character
- Portrayed by: Joe Klocek
- First appearance: 7 July 2017
- Last appearance: 2 August 2017
- Introduced by: Jason Herbison
In-universe information
- Occupation: Mechanic

Evan Lewis, played by Joe Klocek, made his first appearance on 7 July 2017. The character and Klocek's casting details were announced on 26 June. Evan is introduced as a rival for Ben Kirk (Felix Mallard). Tyler Brennan (Travis Burns) hires Evan as an apprentice mechanic at the local garage, and Ben soon learns he has more experience than him. Evan is also a potential love interest for Yashvi Rebecchi (Olivia Junkeer), who learns that they both have a passion for BMX bikes.

Evan begins working at Fitzgerald Motors alongside Tyler Brennan, and fellow apprentice Ben Kirk. Tyler tells Ben that Evan is in the third year of his apprenticeship, and sends Ben to get the coffees while he and Evan work inside. Evan comes to check on Ben and meets Yashvi Rebecchi. He admires her BMX bike, and asks if she is a member of a local Facebook BMX group. Yashvi later brings her bike to the garage for Evan to check over. When Yashvi's father brings his car to the garage, Yashvi takes the opportunity to spend time with Evan. They have a disagreement and Yashvi says he is stupid. She comes to apologise and invites Evan to a football game. Yashvi is forced to cancel the date when her younger sister goes missing, but Evan helps her search. He and Yashvi later attend a screening of another football match at Erinsborough Backpackers' and Yashvi gets drunk. Her mother confronts Evan, and he tells Yashvi that they are never going out again.

Days later, Yashvi comes by the garage and asks if she and Evan are okay. Ben points out that Yashvi still likes him and Evan later asks her out on another date. While they are together in Evan's car, Yashvi sends him out as she thinks she heard something. When he gets back in, he realises Yashvi has been through his phone and knows that he is Piper Willis' (Mavournee Hazel) internet troll. She throws his phone away and locks him out of the car when he goes to retrieve it. Yashvi accidentally reverses the car and hits something, which she assumes is Evan and she drives off. Evan calls Yashvi and she apologises for hitting him with the car and asks if the ambulance she called found him. He lies that his leg was injured and he cannot walk. He blackmails Yashvi into keeping quiet about him being Piper's troll. The following day, Evan comes to collect his car from the garage and quits his job. Yashvi's aunt Mishti Sharma (Scarlet Vas) confronts Evan for lying about being injured and harassing Piper. Evan is arrested and Piper tells him off for being a coward at the police station. Evan later receives a 12-month good behaviour bond.

== Fay Brennan ==
Fay Brennan
- Neighbours character
- Portrayed by: Zoe Bertram
- Duration: 2017–2021
- First appearance: 28 July 2017
- Last appearance: 8 March 2021
- Introduced by: Jason Herbison
In-universe information
- Occupation: Vineyard manager Manager of The Waterhole
- Husband: Russell Brennan (divorced)
- Sons: Mark Brennan; Aaron Brennan; Tyler Brennan
- Daughters: Chloe Brennan

Fay Brennan, played by Zoe Bertram, made her first appearance on 28 July 2017. Bertram's casting was announced on 17 July. She previously appeared in the show as Lorraine Dowski in 2011. Fay is the mother of Mark Brennan (Scott McGregor), Aaron Brennan (Matt Wilson) and Tyler Brennan (Travis Burns). Her introduction was revealed by Burns in May 2017. He commented that she would have a secret, while her arrival brings up issues from Tyler's past, resulting in "a big confrontation scene." Fay's introduction came about after the death of actor Russell Kiefel, who played the brothers' father Russell Brennan. Kiefel was due to reprise his role, but his unexpected death led to a storyline change. Wilson explained that all three brothers have various issues with their mother and Aaron acts "very out of character" towards her. Fay returns on 7 August 2020, as her Huntington's disease worsens and her daughter Chloe Brennan (April Rose Pengilly) wants her around. Pengilly said Chloe also wants to give her brothers a break. Bertram reprised the role for a final guest stint in February 2021. Fay's condition rapidly deteriorates while she is in Erinsborough and the character's death aired on 8 March 2021.

Fay comes to Erinsborough to see her sons Mark, Aaron and Tyler. Mark is pleased to see her, but Aaron questions her sudden visit. Fay later talks with Tyler about her divorce from their father, Russell. She apologises for leaving him and his brothers with Russell and for the abuse Tyler suffered at his hands. She also admits that she should have come to see him after he told her about it two years ago. Tyler accepts her apology and they reconcile, but Aaron is still angry with Fay for leaving them. Russell attempts to call Fay, but she rejects his call. His former partner Sheila Canning (Colette Mann) later introduces herself to Fay and asks if she has heard from Russell lately. Aaron and Fay talk and he tells her that he wishes she could have been around while he was coming to terms with his sexuality. Fay explains that Russell has been calling her lately, while Mark tells her Russell sent Sheila an apology letter. Fay calls Russell back and he asks her to visit him in Port Lincoln. Aaron encourages her to go.

Fay returns a couple of weeks later to inform the boys that Russell has had a heart attack and is in the hospital. As they plan to visit him, the hospital calls Fay and she informs her sons that Russell has died. Aaron's partner David Tanaka (Takaya Honda) contacts the hospital for more information and reveals that Russell's last words were Memory Cove, a place the family used to visit. Fay tells her sons that she is going back to Port Lincoln, before explaining to Sheila that she had an affair in Memory Cove and fell pregnant. Sheila realises that one of Russell's sons was not his and Fay begs her to keep it a secret. She then leaves town without saying goodbye. Fay returns when Sheila tells Mark, Aaron and Tyler the truth. Fay reveals that she had the affair while she and Russell were going through a rough patch in their marriage, so she knew the baby was not Russell's. She then tells Tyler he is not Russell's son and that his father's name is Hamish Roche (Sean Taylor). Fay apologises to Tyler, but he asks her to leave. At The Waterhole, Fay tells Sheila that without her, she might not have had the courage to tell Tyler the truth. Mark and Aaron tell her that it might take some time before Tyler can forgive her, and Fay returns to Adelaide. Fay later returns, at Mark's request. She sees Louise McLeod (Maria Theodorakis) at Erinsborough Hospital and recognises her as a nurse who cared for Russell in Port Lincoln. This leads Mark to deduce that Louise was in a relationship with Hamish and helped him murder Russell. Hamish is later killed, and while Tyler is awaiting trial for his murder, Fay claims she was the culprit, but her sons do not believe her confession. It is later revealed that she is innocent, as she spent the night of the murder with Bill Warley (Darren Mort).

Fay comes to Lassiters Hotel to visit her daughter Chloe Brennan (April Rose Pengilly), who has recently moved to Erinsborough. Fay walks in on Chloe kissing her boss Leo Tanaka (Tim Kano). Fay reveals that she has to sell her house, as she has been funding Chloe's lifestyle. Chloe vows to pay her mother back, while Fay says she will keep Chloe's relationship with Leo to herself. Fay and Sheila agree to look out for jobs for one another, but they fall out when Fay is offered Sheila's old job of managing The Waterhole. Chloe tells Fay that Sheila's son Gary Canning (Damien Richardson) is romantically interested in her, so she asks him out and he accepts. Following their date, Fay hears Gary telling Sheila that he is not interested in her. Sheila explains that she forced Gary into going on the date. When Fay hears that Tyler is struggling to cope in prison, she quits her job and returns to Adelaide. Fay returns to walk Aaron down the aisle during his wedding to David. Fays visits her children after Mark announces his engagement to Elly Conway (Jodi Anasta). She asks Chloe how she was able to pay her back in such large amounts, and Chloe explains that she went on dates with men in return for payment. She later tells Fay that she has Huntington's disease and that she suspects that Fay has it too. Fay admits that she has been having symptoms for a while and agrees to get tested. Fay's test comes back positive, and she decides to go to Bali to be with Tyler.

Fay returns to Erinsborough for Mark and Elly's wedding, where Elly reveals that she cheated on Mark with Chloe. When Chloe continues to talk about Elly, Fay slaps her as she is angry with Chloe's selfishness towards Mark. Fay tries to help Mark and Elly reconcile and she apologises to Chloe for slapping her. Fay tries giving Piper an update about Tyler, but Piper struggles to hear how he has moved on with his life when she is treading water. Mark tells Fay that Elly is pregnant and she encourages him to forgive Elly, before she returns to Adelaide. A few months later, Tyler calls his siblings to tell them Fay has gone missing. She soon turns up in Erinsborough and explains that she heard from Chloe that Mark was going through a hard time. Mark, Aaron and Chloe realise that Fay's Huntington's Disease is worse, and David later tells them that Fay's condition has progressed significantly. He suggests that she will need 24-hour supervision. The family go to Adelaide to come up with a plan for Fay, and Mark decides to move there to help Tyler and Piper take care of her. Months later, Mark calls Chloe to let her know that Fay almost choked on some food and needs to have a PEG tube fitted. Chloe goes to Adelaide to see her and, after talking it over with her husband Pierce Greyson (Tim Robards), invites Fay to stay with them for a while to give Mark and Tyler a break. Chloe and Pierce make the house more accessible, as Fay now uses a wheelchair, and they hire Nicolette Stone (Charlotte Chimes) to be her live-in nurse. Fay becomes fond of Nicolette, unaware of her ongoing feud with Pierce and her romantic feelings for Chloe. She is delighted when Chloe announces that she is pregnant. Pierce arranges for Fay to go on holiday with Aaron and David, and when she returns, she learns that Nicolette has got a new job. Fay arranges a baby shower for Chloe but she breaks down and reveals she has miscarried the baby. Fay decides to return to Adelaide; before she goes, she discovers that Nicolette has been causing a rift in Chloe and Pierce's marriage and urges her to stay away.

In the months that follow, Chloe separates from Pierce after Nicolette exposes his infidelity with Dipi Rebecchi (Sharon Johal). Chloe ends her friendship with Nicolette over her role in exposing Pierce's affair, but things are complicated when Nicolette becomes a surrogate for Aaron and David. When Fay visits Erinsborough, she mistakes the tension between Chloe and Nicolette for attraction, and continues to bond with Nicolette over her future grandchild. Aware of Nicolette's manipulative past, Toadie Rebecchi (Ryan Moloney) is suspicious when Fay changes her will to include Nicolette and raises it with the Brennans. Nicolette then confesses her past misdeeds, but Fay forgives her and insists she is part of their family. With her health deteriorating quickly, Fay pursues completing a bucket list, which includes trying Gary's famous chocolates one more time. She accidentally consumes a piece of chocolate which leads to an infection in her lungs. This becomes pneumonia and she is told she has days to live. She initially hides her diagnosis but confesses as her health worsens. She dies peacefully surrounded by Chloe, Aaron, David and Nicolette. Her body is flown to Adelaide for her funeral.

== Hamish Roche ==
Hamish Roche
- Neighbours character
- Portrayed by: Sean Taylor
- Duration: 2017–2018
- First appearance: 4 September 2017
- Last appearance: 8 October 2018
- Introduced by: Jason Herbison
In-universe information
- Occupation: Property developer
- Sons: Tyler Brennan; Cassius Grady

Hamish Roche, played by Sean Taylor, made his first appearance on 4 September 2017. The character's introduction was announced on 16 August 2017, while Taylor's casting details were announced on 28 August 2017. Hamish is Tyler Brennan's (Travis Burns) biological father, who arrives shortly after Tyler's mother Fay Brennan (Zoe Bertram) reveals that she had an affair, while married to Russell Brennan (Russell Kiefel). Bridget McManus of The Sydney Morning Herald described Taylor as being "marvellously suave" in his role of Hamish Roche. She also called the character a "smooth operator", and thought he worked "a little too hard" in his attempt to bond with Tyler and his brothers. McManus found the mystery of why he has a playing card in his wallet to be a "complicated familial conundrum on which soaps thrive". Hamish was killed off on 7 November 2017, but he made a brief reappearance on 22 August 2018, in which his murder is depicted in a flashback.

While he is in The Waterhole, Hamish notices Tyler Brennan playing pool and joins him for a game. He later turns up at Number 24 and introduces himself, and Tyler realises that Hamish is his father. He tells him to leave. Tyler's brother Mark Brennan (Scott McGregor) confronts Hamish, who states that he wants to get to know his son. Tyler later visits Hamish at Lassiter's with his girlfriend Piper Willis (Mavournee Hazel) and they talk. Hamish accepts Tyler's invitation to dine at The Waterhole with him and his brothers, Mark and Aaron Brennan (Matt Wilson). Hamish reveals that he never met their father Russell, but it emerges that he has the missing ace of spades playing card sent to him by Russell. Hamish gets to know Sheila Canning (Colette Mann). Hamish visits the boat Russell left to Tyler and Aaron, and encourages him to leave a message for Russell on his voicemail, like Aaron is doing. Hamish later pulls out Russell's phone and listens to Tyler's message. Hamish asks if he can stay on the boat, as he does not like the noise from the renovations at the hotel. Hamish continues to charm Sheila, before he meets up with his partner Louise McLeod (Maria Theodorakis) to tell her that he is working hard to secure the boat, so they can leave the country and avoid paying a large tax bill. He also plans to bring Tyler with them. When Tyler tells Hamish of his plans to sell the boat, Hamish convinces him to keep it and fix the engine himself.

Hamish learns about Tyler's history at the garage and that he is on his last chance with the boss. Hamish takes Tyler's keys to the garage and sabotages the mobile hoist, which later falls on Amy Williams, resulting in Tyler's dismissal from the garage. Hamish tells Amy that he will donate $200,000 to her Wellness Centre. When Sheila drops by the boat, she finds Russell's phone, but Hamish tells her it is his and then kisses her. Louise turns up unexpectedly and thinks they are ready to go, but Hamish wants to wait until Tyler has his boat licence. He convinces Louise to return to Port Lincoln. Hamish learns about Russell's abuse of Tyler. He starts putting doubts in Tyler's head about Mark's temper and tries goading Mark into violence. He manipulates Tyler into abandoning his brothers, and employs T-Bone to create fake texts that imply Piper has been cheating on Tyler with him. Hamish invites an increasingly isolated Tyler to join him on a trip overseas using the boat. When Louise becomes convinced that Hamish will betray her, she threatens to expose the fact that they worked together to get Russell to change his will, stole the original version, and murdered him. To stop her, Hamish poisons her with peanut oil, causing an anaphylactic reaction that leaves her comatose. However Mark and Sheila uncover clues to Hamish's true agenda, and Louise eventually awakens and steals the boat, also leaving information for Tyler, revealing Hamish's bankruptcy and the extent of his crimes. On the night of the Guy Fawkes Gala, Tyler confronts Hamish and they get into an argument, during which Tyler accuses Hamish of killing Russell, which he does not deny. The next morning Hamish is found dead in the hot tub of the Canning's family home by Stephanie Scully (Carla Bonner). The police conclude that he was murdered. Tyler later confesses to hitting Hamish with a garden gnome, and he is sent to prison. Months later, Hamish's other son Cassius Grady (Joe Davidson) reveals that after Tyler left, he drowned Hamish.

== Cassius Grady ==
Cassius Grady
- Neighbours character
- Portrayed by: Joe Davidson
- Duration: 2017–2018
- First appearance: 6 November 2017
- Last appearance: 6 November 2018
- Introduced by: Jason Herbison
In-universe information
- Occupation: Gardener; Garden nursery worker
- Father: Hamish Roche
- Mother: Elissa Gallow
- Half-brothers: Tyler Brennan

Cassius Grady, played by Joe Davidson, made his first appearance on 6 November 2017. Davidson was uncredited for this appearance, in which he appeared in the background of a party scene. The character and Davidson's casting details were later announced on 18 May 2018. Of joining the cast, Davidson said "I'm really enjoying it and there is a great sense of family here and everyone is so down to earth and friendly." Cassius is a gardener. Helen Daly of Daily Express said he would get "pulses racing – and it's not just because of his gardening skills." She also reported that he would become "sought-after" and that viewers would soon realise that there is more to Cassius than meets the eye. Cassius made his first credited appearance on 23 May 2018. Flashback scenes broadcast on 22 August 2018 revealed Cassius as the murderer of his father, Hamish Roche (Sean Taylor). Davidson filmed these scenes before beginning his regular role, along with his initial background appearance, which takes place on the same day. At the conclusion of his storyline, the character was written out and Davidson made his final appearance as Cassius on 6 November 2018.

Cassius delivers leaflets detailing his gardening skills around Ramsay Street, and Gary Canning (Damien Richardson) brings him round to the yard at Number 26 to meet his mother Sheila (Colette Mann), who tells Gary that she does not want a gardener. However, Sheila later meets Cassius in the Lassiters Complex and hires him to tend to her garden, as she will be too busy with her new job. When Dipi Rebecchi (Sharon Johal) attempts to employ Cassius, Sheila arranges an exclusive contract with him. While picking up potting mix from Sonya's Nursery, Cassius knocks a box of apples that Piper Willis (Mavournee Hazel) was planning to juice, into a wheelbarrow full of manure. He gives Piper a brief apology and leaves. But he later replaces the apples with an apology note. Elly Conway (Jodi Anasta) brings Cassius to Number 28 and tells Susan (Jackie Woodburne) and Karl Kennedy (Alan Fletcher) that he is looking for work. Karl is unsure whether Cassius' work will be up to his standards, so Cassius offers to do some hours for free. Piper later gives him some tips to win Karl over, but Karl sees through Cassius' attempts to get on his good side and urges him to keep it up. Karl and Shane Rebecchi (Nicholas Coghlan) later fire Cassius after learning their wives have been watching him work. Cassius and Piper grow closer, and they share a kiss. He struggles with Piper's lingering feelings for her incarcerated former boyfriend, Tyler Brennan (Travis Burns), and she flees their awkward first date, as she feels that she is not ready to move on.

Xanthe Canning (Lilly Van De Meer) discovers that Cassius is the mystery book underliner Piper has been searching for. When Piper finds out, she meets with Cassius, who explains that the underlining is just something he does. He also mentions that he passed through Erinsborough a few months previously, where he dropped off some books at the book exchange. Piper apologises for leaving their date and they start their relationship over. Cassius takes a phone call and tells the caller that while he knows it is dangerous being in Erinsborough, he has fallen in love with Piper. Cassius helps Xanthe with some exercises to relieve pain in her hand, after she is injured in a hit-and-run. He tells Piper that he helped his mother with her rehab when she had an accident. The Cannings later employ Cassius to help Xanthe with her physiotherapy, but he rejects their offer of a room at Number 26, telling Piper that it would be awkward because of Xanthe's crush on him. When Piper accepts a new job, Sonya Rebecchi (Eve Morey) hires Cassius in her place at the nursery. Piper and Cassius plan to consummate their relationship, but Piper runs out of the Backpackers as it reminds her of Tyler. While comforting Piper, Cassius has a flashback to the time he rescued her from the shoreline and took her to the hospital. He later has a flashback to the time he rescued Gabriel Smith (Kian Bafekrpour) and brought him home to his parents. Cassius learns that his mother Elissa Gallow (Verity Charlton) has arrived in Erinsborough and is staying at Lassiters. When he visits her, Elissa urges Cassius to leave with her before anyone discovers that he is the one who really murdered his father, Hamish Roche (Sean Taylor). It emerges that Cassius came to Erinsborough to confront Hamish and ended up drowning him in the Canning's spa, before letting his half-brother, Tyler, take the blame. Cassius later returned to Erinsborough and posed as a gardener, so he could find his medallion that he dropped on the night of Hamish's death. Cassius refuses to leave with Elissa, as he is in love with Piper.

Bea Nilsson (Bonnie Anderson) catches Cassius taking Tyler's case file from Rebecchi Law, and he claims that he was interested and wanted to see if he could help. He later snaps at Bea when she tries to pick up his fallen bag. Cassius burns the jacket he gave Piper the night he found her on the shore. When Bea finds a keyring in Cassius' truck and he loses his temper with her Piper suggests that he speaks with a therapist and Cassius agrees. Piper and Cassius consummate their relationship. He then learns that Piper's brother Ned Willis (Ben Hall) has contacted Elissa, who tells him that she has booked a flight to Senegal, from which he cannot be extradited. Cassius tries to persuade Piper to join him, but she refuses to abandon her family and job. After learning that he saved her, Piper goes after Cassius seeking an explanation. Piper confronts Cassius as he tries to leave town, and he admits that he murdered Hamish, after which she calls the police and stalls him until they arrive. Cassius is brought to the police station for questioning. After learning that his mother has been arrested, Cassius refuses to talk until he knows she will be okay. Piper urges him to confess and he does. Cassius is transferred to Warrinor Prison. He asks Sheila to visit, and he apologises to her for the way Hamish's death affected her family. She accepts his apology, as she knows how badly Hamish treated him and the Brennans. Cassius asks if she can get Piper to visit him, but Mark and Aaron tell him to stop contacting Piper. Days later, Bea and Ned visit, so Bea can explain to Cassius how his behaviour affected her. Tyler also comes to see Cassius and accuses him of stealing months of his life. Later that day, Cassius is attacked by a fellow prisoner and has to undergo surgery at the hospital. Ned apologises to Cassius after revealing that a gang friend of his arranged the attack, after Ned spoke to him about Cassius. Piper has a pregnancy scare, but after learning that she is not pregnant, she says goodbye to Cassius.

== Rory Zemiro ==
Rory Zemiro
- Neighbours character
- Portrayed by: Ash Williams
- Duration: 2017–2018
- First appearance: 7 November 2017
- Last appearance: 7 February 2018
- Introduced by: Jason Herbison
In-universe information
- Occupation: Exotic dancer Yoga instructor

Rory Zemiro, played by Ash Williams, made his first appearance on 7 November 2017. The character and casting details were announced on 1 November. Williams auditioned for the extended guest role, and commented "I was like this sounds fun and cool and I had to put some work into it as it's not my forte." The comedian said he "relished" the chance to make the switch from comedy to drama. He called his character's storyline fun and a "beautiful, wonderful story." Rory is an exotic dancer and Aaron Brennan's (Matt Wilson) former boyfriend. Williams admitted that Rory has an agenda, saying "I'm pretty naughty, trying to run a business and also trying to find love, and it's good playing a character like that." Wilson later explained that Rory and Aaron met when they joined a dance troupe and had a relationship "many moons ago". When Rory sees Aaron again, he believes that things are going to go back to how they were between them.

Rory comes to see his former boyfriend Aaron Brennan at his hotel room in Paris. Rory explains that he saw Aaron was in the city from his Instagram posts and sweet talked the receptionist into giving him Aaron's room number. Rory tells Aaron that his former exotic dance troupe Rough Trade are on tour in Europe and that the boys would love to see him. Rory then helps Aaron to change his flight. Weeks later, Rory comes to Erinsborough to see Aaron. He witnesses Aaron's boyfriend David Tanaka (Takaya Honda) proposing to him. While working out at Aaron's gym, The Shed, Rory injures his back and has to go to the hospital, where he is treated by David. Rory visits The Flame Tree Retreat for a massage and Amy Williams (Zoe Cramond) offers him a job teaching yoga. Aaron later thanks Rory for not saying anything to David about their relationship, or their meeting in Paris. Rory asks Aaron to fill in for him at an audition. Rory teaches Aaron a dance routine and tries to get him to rejoin the dance troupe.

David comes to see the audition and learns that Aaron and Rory dated and that they met up in Paris. Rory later apologises to David, who tells him that he ended his relationship with Aaron. Rory notices Aaron's attempts to reunite with David. He later buys Aaron a drink and kisses him, but Aaron pulls away. Rory and Aaron notice Rough Trade fan Mick Allsop (Joel Creasey) is in town. Aaron had been led to believe that Mick was obsessed with him and often broke into the hotel rooms to get closer to him. Rory later tells Aaron that Mick has trashed his motel room, and he meets up with Mick at the Erinsborough Backpackers to talk. After Rory shows Aaron that David is now on a dating site, he kisses Aaron again and they spend the night together. Aaron confronts Rory after learning that Mick is actually obsessed with Rory, and had been having a casual relationship with him while he and Aaron were dating. Aaron also deduces that Rory broke up with him and sacked him from Rough Trade, as he preferred having casual relationships. Rory tells Aaron that Mick is lying, but Aaron texts Mick from Rory's phone and Mick's reply confirms Aaron's suspicions. Aaron then asks Rory to get out of his life.

== Joanne Schwartz ==
Joanne Schwartz
- Neighbours character
- Portrayed by: Val Lehman
- First appearance: 1 December 2017
- Last appearance: 5 December 2017
- Introduced by: Jason Herbison
In-universe information
- Husband: Arthur
- Sons: Simon; Robert
- Daughters: Catherine

Joanne Schwartz, played by Val Lehman, made her first appearance on 1 December 2017. The character and Lehman's casting details were announced on 5 September 2017. The actress filmed her scenes during the same week at the Nunawading studios, where she also filmed the Prisoner series in the 80's. She was reunited with her Prisoner co-star Colette Mann for the guest stint. Of joining the Neighbours cast, Lehman said "I was very surprised and delighted to receive the call about the role, something I thought would never happen." Joanne is an old friend of Sheila Canning (Mann), who comes back into her life. Daniel Kilkelly of Digital Spy called her an "unexpected blast from Sheila's colourful past". Lehman added that Joanne and Sheila would be "very much at odds" with one another.

Joanne is Sheila Canning's former best friend. They fell out during high school when they mistakenly thought each other was buying tickets to see Daddy Cool. Joanne then invited Sheila's crush, and future husband, Frank Canning to the school dance. Years later, Joanne agrees to meet Sheila in Erinsborough. They initially reminisce about some fun times they had in high school, before admitting that they are each waiting for an apology for the ticket fiasco and Frank. After bragging about their children, Sheila tells Joanne that she is performing a one-woman show at an upcoming variety night. Joanne then reminds Sheila of the last time she was on stage, where she forgot her lines and vomited over the lead actor. Joanne returns to Erinsborough to watch Sheila's performance. She laughs loudly when there is feedback from the microphone, causing Sheila to run off. Sheila comes back to perform her piece and when she mentions high school, Joanne hides in the bathroom. Sheila finds her and Joanne admits that she was jealous of Sheila in school, especially when Frank broke up with her for Sheila. Joanne also admits that she was meant to buy the Daddy Cool tickets, but was distracted by her Knitting Nancy. Sheila suggests that they go and see Daddy Cool's lead singer Ross Wilson in concert, but only if Joanne buys the tickets.

== Others ==
| Date(s) | Character | Actor | Circumstances |
|---|---|---|---|
| 12 January | Rachel Walker | Jessica Tregear | Rachel is Maxine Cowper's physiotherapist. She approaches Ned Willis at The Waterhole to ask if they are still meeting at his house and Ned tries to introduce her to Elly Conway. Elly later sees Ned and Rachel leaving his swimming pool together and she assumes they are dating. Ned explains to Elly that Rachel is helping Maxine out with her hydrotherapy, as she gets anxious at the local pool. |
| 16 January | Wendell Danson | Kurtis Lowden | Wendell approaches Paige Smith in a club and asks to buy her drink, but she declines. When he persists, David Tanaka warns him off and Wendell leaves. |
| 18 January–26 October | Li-Kim Chen | Kate Song | Xanthe Canning tells Li-Kim that she is an inspiration to her and asks how she knows the answers to everything. Li-Kim tells her that she just studies hard. Elly Conway later finds Li-Kim talking to Ned Willis about tattoos and tells her to go back to class. Weeks later, Li-Kim buys a fake ID from Piper Willis. Li-Kim tells Xanthe that Ben Kirk and Yashvi Rebecchi had sex. Xanthe initially dismisses the rumour, but Li-Kim insists that it happened because she overheard them discussing about it. Li-Kim later tells Xanthe that Ben and Yashvi are sending personal photos to each other. Li-Kim comes to see Elly Conway set up a community book exchange and Elly recommends a book to her. Li-Kim and her friends develop a crush on Jack Callahan and Li-Kim later convinces Elly that she needs to make an appointment with Jack for a counselling session. |
| 23 January–1 March | Lee Darwin | Laura Edwards | Lee carries out Sonya Rebecchi's ultrasound. She carries out another ultrasound a few weeks later, and tells Sonya and Mark Brennan that the baby is a girl. She then asks David Tanaka to come and have a look at the scan, as she notices something is potentially wrong with the baby. |
| 24 January | Wombat handler | Andrea McKewen | The wombat handler brings Warnie the wombat to the launch party of the Erinsborough Backpackers. |
| 24–27 January | Warnie | Uncredited | Warnie is a wombat joey, who is brought to the launch party of the Erinsborough Backpackers. Warnie moves into an enclosure within the Backpackers vicinity and Tim Collins publishes an article in the West Waratah Star newspaper about Warnie. Before the Backpackers' opening, Leo finds Warnie missing and a ransom note requesting $1500 in exchange for his return. Leo suspects his father, Paul Robinson and Terese Willis have taken Warnie, but they deny it. It soon emerges that Gary Canning has taken the wombat and is keeping him in a garden shed. Gary finds out Amy Williams is going to loan the ransom money to Leo, so Gary anonymously returns Warnie. |
| 2 February | Jacqueline Rosser | Janet Foye | Jacqueline lunches with Jack Callahan and three fellow church members. She takes a liking to Ned Willis when she learn he is doing community service. |
| 8 February | Hassan "Ace" Nasir | Riley Evans | While he is at the Rec Centre, Ace volunteers to help Amy Williams fix a leak at the Flame Tree restaurant. Amy sets Ace a task and she tells him not to touch anything, as she goes to her ute to fetch more tools. Ace deliberately bursts the pipe and leaves to meet Leo Tanaka, who pays him. |
| 9 February | Neil Strong | Joe Petruzzi | Gary Canning arranges to meet Kev McNally, but Neil shows up instead and reveals that Kev will not back down until he has his money. Gary asks Neil to tell Kev to leave his family alone. Neil later shows up at Gary's home and grabs Sheila Canning. She manages to scream out, attracting Gary's attention. Neil lets her go and runs off. |
| 9 February | Bibiana Nasir | Christine Kaman | Ace's grandmother Bibiana speaks with Father Jack Callahan about his sabotage of a water pipe at the Flame Tree restaurant. She tells Jack that Ace feels bad for actions, but he did not want to accompany her to apologise. |
| 10 February | Bruce McNally | Gil Tucker | Bruce is Kev McNally's father. Sheila Canning meets with Bruce to get him to convince Kev to leave her son Gary Canning alone. Sheila brings Bruce back to her home and raises the subject of Kev and Gary's falling out. Bruce then reveals that he is ashamed of his son for tricking Gary. |
| 17 February | Eva Solis | Jasmine Vaughns | Eva enters Erinsborough Backpackers and remarks to Piper Willis about how good looking Tyler Brennan is. Piper replies that Tyler is her boyfriend and Eva tells her not to let him out of her sight. |
| 17 February–17 March | Maria Buraczek | Linda Jean Bruno | Piper Willis comes to the Back Lane Bar to see Tyler Brennan, but Maria stops her from coming in without an ID. Piper says she is Tyler's girlfriend, but Maria asks her to leave. Maria watches on as Elly Conway makes a scene and Tyler escorts her out. Maria later fires Tyler. |
| 24 February–15 June | Bishop Green | Mirko Grillini | Father Jack Callahan brings Bishop Green to the local hospital during a tour of the area, and introduces him to Brad Willis and a pregnant Paige Smith. He explains that the bishop is overseeing the building of transitional accommodation for refugees. Jack tells Bishop Green that he thinks he could be the father of her baby. Bishop Green takes confession and hears Paige admitting that Jack is the father of her unborn baby. Bishop Green encourages Paige to keep the truth to herself and let Jack be free to continue his work in the community. The bishop then tells Jack that he is not the father. Bishop Green later calls Jack to reassure him about his meeting at the Premier's office. Jack tells Bishop Green how he plans to be a father to his child and stay committed to the church, but the bishop expresses his concern that Jack is making a mistake. Jack confronts the bishop about asking Paige to keep quiet about the baby and Bishop Green admits that he was trying to protect the church. Bishop Green later suspends Jack, and Lauren Carpenter confronts him about how he treated Paige. When Jack tells Bishop Green that he is leaving the church to be a proper father to his son, Bishop Green says the parish will be closed immediately. |
| 27 February–13 September 2017, 21 May 2018 | Freya Stone | Adele Wilson | Freya demands that Piper Willis get her and her friends some fake IDs, after Bec Simmons is suspended for making them. Months later, Freya comes to Harold's Café to ask Yashvi Rebecchi about the rumours she had sex with Ben Kirk. Freya tells Yashvi to give her the details later. When Freya starts to think Yashvi is lying about her relationship with Ben, Yashvi shows her a naked picture of Ben she says he sent to her. Freya continues to ask Yashvi about Ben, and she later invites them both to her post-formal party. Sheila Canning invites Freya and her friends to Xanthe Canning's birthday party and Freya spikes both Xanthe and Piper's drinks with her sister's ADHD medication. |
| 2 March 2017, 3 May–11 June 2018 | Olive Murray | Karenza Stevens | Olive is a nurse at Erinsborough Hospital tasked with supervising Xanthe Canning during her work experience. Olive finds Xanthe talking to a patient, and tells her that she should be following and observing her. Olive later catches Xanthe talking to Ben Kirk and says her report to the school will not be positive. The following year, Karl Kennedy thanks Olive for coming to the press launch for his MRI screening scheme. Rita Newland later approaches Olive after noticing Olive consistently opposes the COO Clive Gibbons during meetings. Olive says she and Clive have trouble agreeing on how the hospital should run. She also tells Rita that there are others who share her concerns. |
| 6–14 March | Keith Schmidt | Joshua Diaz | When Stephanie Scully comes to collect her motorbike from the garage, Keith tells her it has gone and that he assumed she had picked it up. When Mark Brennan comes to question Keith, he finds the bike outside. Keith goes inside to meet with Ellen Crabb, who tells him that the bike is part of a high-level police sting that Mark is not privy to. Keith agrees to say the bike was at the garage the whole time. Tyler Brennan comes to the garage and tells Keith that he is borrowing an angle grinder, tarp and the van to help out at a car accident. |
| 7 March 2017 – 22 October 2018 | Dr. Rob Carson | Christopher Farrell | An obstetrician who carries out an amniocentesis on Sonya Rebecchi and Mark Brennan's baby. He later stitches Finn Kelly's head injury. The following year, Dr. Carson supervises Xanthe Canning's work experience. Xanthe apologises for being on the phone to her boyfriend, before impressing Dr. Carson with her research. He invites her to watch him administer an epidural. Dr. Carson is set up on a date with Mishti Sharma, but he ends it when Mishti starts questioning him too much about his future plans. He meets Amy Williams outside Lassiters and they share a joke. When Amy comes for a check-up at the hospital, he sends a colleague in his place, as he likes her. David Tanaka gives him Amy's phone number, and they arrange a date, which goes well. They soon begin dating, and are later caught having sex in the Robinson Heights show home by Amy's father. Dr. Carson asks Amy to buy a house with him, but she turns him down as she given Gary Canning a large amount of money. Dr. Carson verbally attacks Gary and Amy breaks up with him. During a presentation of a urine to water generator, Dr. Carson notices Gary and Amy kissing, and sprays them and the crowd with urine. |
| 8 March | Counsellor | Chris Maree Wilson | The counsellor listens as Sonya and Toadfish Rebecchi talk through their issues. |
| 16 March | Sabra Dumas | Tiana Hogben | Sabra is a server at The Waterhole, who checks on Terese Willis, Gary Canning and Xanthe Canning's meal. When Xanthe later returns for lunch, Sabra asks if the order should be added to Terese's tab, which leads to Xanthe ordering a three course meal for her and Ben Kirk. |
| 16–17 March | Magda Verbinska | Kasia Grabowski | Leo Tanaka notices Magda sewing her clothes at the backpackers hostel, and tells her there is a job available at The Flametree restaurant, cash-in-hand. Paul Robinson compliments Magda and tells her there are more shifts if she wants them, as he pays her. The following day, Paul asks Magda if she is available to work another shift. He also asks her how she found out about the job and she says that Leo told her about it. |
| 17 March–14 June 2017, 14–28 May 2019, 9–24 March 2020 | Harry Sinclair | Paul Dawber | Susan Kennedy calls Principal Sinclair to discuss Elly Conway and Finn Kelly, who worked at his school. Harry tells her that affairs among the staff are less than ideal, and that Elly was in a painful place after a student embarrassed her by sabotaging a presentation. He also tells Susan that Finn will give her no problems. Finn later calls Harry to thank him. A month later, Elly meets with Harry to discuss Finn, who has made several changes to the school without consultation. She tells Harry that Finn is sick and his behaviour is putting people in danger. Elly asks Harry if he had feelings for Finn, as it is possible he used that to keep Harry onside. Harry admits that he once covered for Finn when he won a promotion using underhand tactics. Harry resurfaces in Erinsborough two years later and is arrested for trying to frame Finn for several crimes, including hiding razor blades in fruit, and placing poison gas in the air vents of the Erinsborough Community Centre. He implicates Ned Willis, and confesses to a hit and run on Finn's lawyer. Harry also explains that he helped Finn when he went on the run the previous year. He enrages Mark Brennan when he admits to knocking over a pregnant Elly. The following year, Finn visits Harry to ask him the location of their locker, claiming to want to destroy it. However, Harry is later paroled and follows Finn to Pierce Greyson's island, where he, Elly, Elly's sister Bea Nilsson and several of their neighbours are celebrating Elly's 35th birthday. Harry films Finn pushing Bea into a mineshaft, and after revealing this, Finn seduces Harry, who warns him that Harlow Robinson and Hendrix Greyson are also on the island. They agree to meet at a cabin in the Snowy Mountains with Elly's daughter Aster Conway. Paul Robinson later flags down Harry after rescuing Toadie Rebecchi, who Finn also attacked. After holding them at gunpoint for several hours, he finally realises the true horror of Finn's actions after seeing the island on fire. He then allows Paul and Toadie to rescue those on the island, after informing them of the location of the campsite and mineshaft, and he calls the emergency services. |
| 20 March | Edwina Pereira | Georgia Blue Ireland | Toadfish Rebecchi goes to a restaurant and asks waitress Edwina if she has seen Andrea and Willow Somers. She tells him that he has just missed them. Edwina then gives him Tube directions to get to Tower Bridge. |
| 4 April | Dr Neva Lee | Kim Ko | Dr Lee asks her colleague Karl Kennedy to look at a chart, as the patient has signed himself out before discussing the results with her. Karl realises that the patient has an aneurysm and says it could be fatal if it bursts. He advises Dr Lee to contact the patient and convince him to return. As he hands the file back, Xanthe Canning notices the file belongs to Finn Kelly. |
| 6 April | Laura Henley | Sophie Sardi | Laura comments on the Harold's Café Easter display, before telling Paige Smith that perhaps she should leave town, knowing that Father Jack Callahan is the father of Paige's unborn baby. |
| 7 April | Yvette Stokes | Elizabeth Esguerra | Yvette asks Tyler Brennan to look over her bike before she leaves the Backpackers. When he gives Yvette her bill, she points out that he has added too many zeroes. Tyler apologises and Yvette offers to make him some special tea, which he declines. Yvette asks Piper Willis if she wants to hang out, but Piper has to leave for work. Yvette spends time with Tyler and Ben Kirk, as they fix her bike. She leaves Tyler some of her tea to say thank you. |
| 7 April | Brandon Henley | William Franklyn-Miller | Brandon is Laura Henley's son. Jack Callahan brings Brandon to Harold's Café, where he apologises for destroying the Easter display. Brandon explains that he wanted some chocolate, but the whole display fell over when he tried to grab some. Before they leave, Jack tells Paige Smith that Laura will pay for any damages, and she will also stop giving Paige a hard time about her pregnancy. |
| 10 April | Nancy Santos | Tara Vagg | Nurse Santos escorts a pregnant Paige Smith into the hospital, after she ingests some tea made with hallucinogens. |
| 19 April | Alexis Little | Irene Chen | Alexis is a massage therapist at the Lassiter's Day Spa. The owner Terese Willis brings her boyfriend Gary Canning in for a massage and wax. Alexis reminds Terese about her request for more towels. Halfway through the massage, Terese returns and tells Alexis that she will takeover, and Alexis can have a break. When Alexis finds out Terese waxed Gary without his consent, she quits. |
| 20 April | Nerida Moor | Kelly Nielsen | Nerida comes into the church to see Jack Callahan. She tells him that she is just out of jail and wants to get onto Centrelink to start applying for jobs, but she needs his help with the paperwork. |
| 24 April–22 May 2017, 8 November 2018 | Myra Blumberg | Anita Torrance | Myra runs an AA meeting, which Sonya Rebecchi attends. At the end of the meeting, she comes over and asks Sonya how everything is at home, before lettings her know that she is available if Sonya wants to talk. A few weeks later, Myra hosts another meeting and congratulates one of the members, who decides not to attend a poker session. |
| 24 April | Roger Cross | Donnie Baxter | Roger goes on a date with Amy Williams, who asks if they can go back to his hotel room. |
| 27 April–23 October | T-Bone | Des Flanagan | Piper Willis befriends Canadian backpacker T-Bone when he stays at Erinsborough Backpackers, making her boyfriend Tyler Brennan jealous. Piper films T-Bone singing for her vlog, causing her to be distracted when Tyler tries to talk to her. T-Bone later plays his music too loud and when Piper asks him to turn it down, he flirts with her and calls Tyler stupid. While playing dodgeball, T-Bone slams the ball into the side of the Backpackers and Tyler asks him to stop. Tyler learns that T-Bone has been flirting with Piper, and when he asks him to turn his music down, they get into a scuffle. Tyler asks T-Bone to leave, and Piper does the same. T-Bone later harasses her by calling her phone. Tyler finds T-Bone in the city and questions him about an accident at the Backpackers, which resulted in Piper's hospitalisation. T-Bone taunts Tyler for not protecting Piper, resulting in Tyler punching him. Tyler later learns T-Bone has an alibi. Months later, T-Bone returns to Erinsborough and meets Piper again. He apologises for the way he acted last time and tells her that he is interviewing for a graphic design course. Hamish Roche approaches T-Bone and offers him money to forge text messages between himself and Piper. |
| 27 April–12 June | Trent Edwards | Matt Jones | Trent works for the education department, and he visits Susan Kennedy to ask her to excuse herself from the upcoming interview process for the assistant principal job at Erinsborough High, as there is a conflict of interest with her niece Elly Conway dating Finn Kelly, a potential candidate for the job. Susan tells Trent that it should be her decision whether she steps down or not, but Trent believes it would be fairer if he made the decision. When Trent later finds out that Susan is making the decision to return as principal, Trent tells her that she should take more time off and Finn will continue being the acting principal. Trent catches Susan in his arms after she slips. |
| 1 May | Jacob Von-Blum | Will Couch | Jacob is a backpacker, who asks for T-Bone whereabouts. Piper Willis tells him that T-Bone has left and suggests that he goes to the Bonza Barbie event with David Tanaka. Jacob later invites David back to the Erinsborough Backpackers to continue talking. |
| 5 May 2017 – 30 March 2021 | Clancy | Rocky | Clancy is Kirsha Rebecchi's dog. After Kirsha struggles with the move to Erinsborough, her father Shane Rebecchi arranges to have Clancy brought to Erinsborough to cheer her up. His wife Dipi Rebecchi reluctantly allows Clancy to stay. Clancy ruins the Lassiters Christmas in July dinner spread when he tries to eat the Christmas turkey. He then goes missing for a few hours, before Shane finds him. Clancy remains with the Rebecchi family after Kirsha moves to Sydney to attend school. A couple of years later, Shane and Dipi also decide to move to Sydney and Clancy leaves Erinsborough with them. |
| 5 May | Dominic Da Costa | Chris Bartholomew | Shane Rebecchi meets with Dominic to thank him for bringing Clancy down to Erinsborough. |
| 12 May | Adrian Fisher | Tony Markulin | Adrian comes to the Lassiter's Spa for a massage, which is carried out by Gary Canning. Brooke Butler silently enters the room and helps out, as she needs information on Adrian's boss Brian, the father of her daughter. Adrian explains that he usually gets his massages at a hotel called Ridgeways, before asking Gary to do his glutes too. |
| 17 May–12 June | Donald Cheng | Trent Huen | Donald is a teacher at Erinsborough High, who is tasked with reviewing the marks Elly Conway has been giving to her students, after a complaint is made. He interviews Xanthe Canning, who tells him about Elly marking Piper Willis down because of the issues between them. Donald questions why he cannot find anything on file about the Piper incident, and Elly explains that she was disciplined and the matter was resolved. Donald realises her aunt Susan Kennedy kept it off the record and tells Elly that he is going to have to tell the department of education. After he is appointed acting principal, Finn Kelly asks Donald to implement the vertical integrated teaching programme despite Donald's protestations that no one is prepared. |
| 29 May 2017, 2 November 2018, 16 April 2019 | Miranda Kelly | Dajana Cahill | Miranda is Finn Kelly's estranged wife. Elly Conway meets with her to talk about Finn's odd behaviour. Miranda slaps Elly for having an affair with Finn, and Elly apologises. She explains that she needs to stop Finn from hurting anyone else. Miranda tells her that Finn's behaviour changed about a year ago and he became withdrawn and nasty. She did not think he was having another affair, and suggests he might have been on drugs or similar. The following year, Elly's sister Bea Nilsson visits Miranda to ask about Finn, who has been using her parents' cabin. Miranda insists that she did not know that he used it, and does not know where he is. Bea warns Miranda that Finn is dangerous and Miranda admits that Finn has been in contact with her. Bea asks Miranda to tell Finn that she wants to forgive him. Months later, Miranda meets with Finn's lawyer Imogen Willis to discuss his case. Miranda says that Finn's brother has asked her for a character reference and she is willing to provide one. Imogen explains that she is going to ask for a non custodial sentence and would like Miranda to consider taking him in, which Miranda agrees to think about. Imogen later suggests that Miranda could be responsible for an attempted hit-and-run on herself and Susan Kennedy, after Finn rejected her at the hospital because he does not know her. |
| 30 May 2017 – 30 March 2018, 18–20 March 2020 | Gabriel Smith | Kian Bafekrpour | Gabriel is the son of Paige Smith and Jack Callahan. He was born in a shack in the bush at 35 weeks, after Paige returned to the site where he was conceived. Gabriel stays in a neonatal unit, as a precaution. After Paige and Gabriel are discharged, they fly up to the Gold Coast with Paige's mother Lauren Carpenter. Gabe is kidnapped by Louise McLeod, and later returned to Paige and Jack by Cassius Grady. Gabe's pram falls into the lake when Mark Brennan accidentally kicks a football at it, but Gabe is unharmed. After his parents reunite, they and Gabe move to Queensland to be closer to Paige's family. Two years later, Jack brings Gabe down to Erinsborough attend Paige's wedding to Mark Brennan. Jack later announces plans to move to Adelaide, so they can all be in the same state. |
| 2 June 2017, 6 December 2019 | Hugh Hammer | Ivan Krslovic | Hugh performs a dance routine at the Back Lane Bar during a Frigay event. Two years later, he performs alongside Diamond La Rue at Chloe Brennan's hen's party. |
| 5 June | Darren Lindsay | David Beamish | Sonya Rebecchi stays with Darren after checking out of rehab. |
| 20 June | Tegan Hargreave | Jennifer B. Ashley | Tegan is federal police officer, who asks Xanthe Canning and Finn Kelly to disembark a plane. |
| 22 June–9 August 2017, 27 July 2020, 28–29 February 2024, 20 February–10 March 2025 | Lana Kline | Elizabeth Parisi | Lana is from the Department of Education, who leads an investigation into Finn Kelly's actions. Principal Susan Kennedy tells Lana that all of Finn's classwork will need to be re-marked, his vertical integration will be reversed and the students will be offered counselling. Lana returns to the school for a meeting with Elly Conway, who enters the office naked after a student steals her clothes. A few years later, Lana visits Erinsborough High after drugs are found on the site and listens to Susan's strategy to fix the problem. In 2024, Lana makes another visit to inspect the school following its transition into a shared site. She meets with principal Jane Harris and is not impressed when the school goes into lockdown after a knife is discovered on school grounds. Lana visits the school one year later and suspends Jane following her relationship with the school cleaner, Clint Hendry (Jason Wilder). |
| 23 June | Chantelle Pennington | Marney McQueen | Chantelle is an old friend of Aaron Brennan, who is in the marketing business. Aaron tells her he has an opportunity for her that he would like to demonstrate, and she agrees to spare an hour of her time. Chantelle comes to Number 22 Ramsay Street with her friends thinking that she going to see a pitch for Aaron's exotic dancing revue, instead of a solar-powered lawnmower. Chantelle goes to leave, but Aaron does a dance routine and Chantelle gives him the name of a potential investor. |
| 27 June–31 October | Jamie Hyatt | Alex Forras | Steph Scully notices Jamie entering Mannix Foster's motel room and sees him exiting it very quickly. She realises that Mannix is conducting secretive deals from his room. Hamish Roche pays Jamie to leave a box of cannabis at the Wellness Centre. |
| 29 June | Charles Diaz | Rowan Howard | Charles is potential investor in Shane Rebecchi's solar-powered lawnmower. After watching a demonstration and reading the sales information, Charles agrees to invest in and manufacturer them. |
| 29 June, 17 November | Luke Browne | Connor Harvey | Luke tells Yashvi Rebecchi about a rumour that Xanthe Canning is pregnant with former teacher Finn Kelly's child. Ben Kirk overhears them talking about Xanthe, and he shoves Luke against a locker, injuring Yashvi. |
| 4–31 July | Val Bennet | Ed Deganos | Val is Terese Willis' assistant. She asks him to push back some meetings to create room for an off site visit. As he leaves, Val recognises Terese's daughter Piper Willis from her vlog. Terese later learns Val failed to reschedule a staff meeting and tells him to push it back. Gary Canning asks Val to schedule some time for a lunch date with Terese, while Paul Robinson asks Val who Terese is meeting with. A few days later, Gary asks Val if he has seen Terese, but Val says she is gone for the day. He also mentions that Terese has been tired lately. Val brings round some paperwork for Terese to sign and he asks when she will be in the office next, as he is getting too many questions for her. Terese requests that they should email her instead and Val leaves, after Piper tells him Terese is busy. Terese later replaces Val with Paige Smith. |
| 7 July | Ali Parry | Holly Myers | Mishti Sharma meets with Ali to sign the paperwork for the sale of The Shed. Ali tells Mishti that the deal is non-refundable. |
| 10–24 July | Dr Harriet Barnes | Rita Kara | Dr Barnes is Terese Willis's oncologist. She recommends treating Terese's breast cancer with a course of chemotherapy, possibly followed by a lumpectomy and radiation. Dr Barnes tells Terese that her cancer has not spread since her treatment began, but it is too early to say if it is shrinking the cancer. She also advises Terese to cut back on her work hours and rest more. |
| 20 July 2017 – 8 February 2018 | Tia Martinez | Erica Brown | Tia is paired with Kirsha Rebecchi for a school assignment, and she later invites Kirsha to a sleepover at her house. Weeks later, Tia texts Kirsha asking for the answers to a maths test. She confronts Kirsha about her lack of reply at school. Acting principal Elly Conway asks Tia to sort out her skirt, as it is too short. Tia later tells Kirsha to steal Elly's clothes while she is showering or Tia will make her life miserable. Tia overhears Jimmy Williams asking for a job at the garden nursery, as he needs the money. She suggests that he steals alcohol from the rooms, as her brother would buy them. Tia makes fun of Kirsha, who has recently had her hearing impaired. Tia knows that Kirsha cannot hear her and Jimmy confronts Tia, before Sonya Rebecchi asks Tia to leave. At school, when Kirsha is unaware that she had had her period, Tia makes fun of her, before being confronted by Xanthe Canning. Tia and her friends are put on suspension and she later sticks a piece of gum in Kirsha's hair. Tia continuously throws nuts at Kirsha's back at Harold's Café, where Tia is caught out and yelled at by Kirsha's mum, Dipi. |
| 20 July | Jane Martinez | Alex McTavish | Tia Martinez asks her mother, Jane, if Kirsha Rebecchi can come to her sleepover. Jane introduces herself to Kirsha's mother Dipi Rebecchi. |
| 24 July–18 May 2020 | Jet Cassidy | Slavko Zwirn | Jet is with the Critical Incident Response Team, who are called to Number 22 Ramsay Street. He tells Paige Smith and Terese Willis to get down on the floor. |
| 25 July 2017, 30 May 2021 | Kurt Bridges | Jeff Gobbels | Kurt is the leader of the Critical Incident Response Team, who are called to Number 22 Ramsay Street. He gives the all clear and confirms that the baby, Gabriel Smith, is okay. He informs Paige Smith and Terese Willis that they received a call about a baby being threatened with a knife. He tells Constable Mark Brennan that the situation looks like a hoax and asks if someone has a grudge against the family. Four years later, Kurt accompanies Constable Andrew Rodwell to arrest Brent Colefax. He also brings in Harlow Robinson, telling them that she is under suspicion of harbouring a fugitive. |
| 25 July | Goro Shimura | Yang Li | Mr Shimura is potential investor in the Udagawa business, who meets with Terese Willis. As she is telling him how well Lassiter's Hotel is doing, she suddenly vomits behind him. |
| 27 July | Luiz Oliveira | Christopher Nayna | Luiz is David Tanaka's personal trainer. Aaron Brennan sees them walking by Lassiter's Lake and assumes they are a couple. |
| 3 August | Fergus Olsen | Andrew Percy | Fergus is Willow Somers' biological father. After receiving an email from Willow, Fergus comes to Erinsborough to meet her. Fergus uses a wheelchair, the result of a swimming accident when he was younger. He tells Willow, Toadfish Rebecchi and Amy Williams that the accident made him change his life. He works as an accountant at the local airport, and has a wife and five-year old twin daughters. Fergus tells Toadie that he tried to find Willow, but she and her mother Andrea Somers moved around too much. Fergus asks Willow to come to Port Macquarie for a visit and talks about making it more permanent. |
| 4 August–7 September | Councillor Simmons | Shane Davidson | Councillor Simmons meets with Sonya Rebecchi to hear her pitch for the Liveable Suburb competition. While viewing the area when she planted several trees, he calls them a great addition to Erinsborough's recreational spaces. Simmons tells Sonya that he and his fellow councillors will secure the mayor's support, but not with her running it. After the statue is removed from Lassiter's Complex, Simmons removes Karl Kennedy as head of the liveability committee, as he previously threatened to get rid of it. |
| 14 August | Cate Bickford | Sian Pryce | Cate is Sonya and Toadfish Rebecchi's relationship counsellor. |
| 14 August 2017, 4–10 July 2019 | Riley Cooper | Lliam Murphy | The unknown man approaches a woman, who looks like Dee Bliss, and asks if she is okay, as she appeared to be miles away. The woman tells him that she is fine, and was just thinking about old times. Two years later, Riley meets with Heather Schilling at a park in Byron Bay. She asks if he knows a woman named Karen. He initially denies he does, until she produces a photo of them together. Heather mentions Toadfish Rebecchi, and gives Riley her phone number to give to Karen. Riley returns to his car, where he tells Karen about Heather. He asks her what she wants to do. After Karen is revealed to be the real Dee Bliss, Riley comes to Erinsborough to give the police a statement. He explains that he dated Dee's sister Cecile Bliss, and they visited him at his workplace before Dee's wedding. Riley was working for criminal gang Zantucks at the time, and they placed a hit on the women, but Riley was unsure as to why. The Zantucks tampered with Dee and Toadie's wedding car, causing the crash. Riley was following behind and rescued Dee. Toadie confronts Riley at the Erinsborough Police Station about lying to Dee and keeping her away. Riley makes it clear that Dee always loved Toadie, not him. The character was credited as "Unknown person" in his first appearance. |
| 25 August | Ollie Fernez | Angus Hopkinson | Ollie is a cancer patient that Nick Petrides is trying to connect with. Jimmy Williams plays chess with Ollie. He later dies from his cancer. |
| 8 September | Sara Khan | Amanda Mar | Sara comes to Nick Petrides hotel room and he explains that she is a patient. She says she received a text from Nick and Mark Brennan asks to look at her phone, where he finds the text from Nick, asking Sara to come and pick up some extra medicine. |
| 14 September 2017, 20 August 2018, 25 April 2019, 13 April 2019 | Brinda Appadoo | Andi Snelling | Nell Rebecchi's kindergarten teacher, who tells her parents Sonya Rebecchi and Toadfish Rebecchi, that Nell has been having a number of behavioural issues, and perhaps should stay at kindergarten for another year. The following year, Brinda tells Sonya that she is not on the approved pick-up list for Hugo Somers, so Sonya cannot take him home. Brinda gives Toadie her condolences following Sonya's death. She tells him that the Erinsborough Community Centre has undergone some changes since he has been gone, with a number of activities being cancelled due to cost cutting. She says the children have been really affected. |
| 15 September | John Rotondo | Vincent Gorce | John contacts Gary Canning to offer him a job interview, while claiming to be the manager of Lanzini's restaurant. John looks at Gary's CV, but decides he has wasted his time when Gary admits that he has previous worked in a prison kitchen. When Gary says his manager at Lassiter's Hotel will give him a reference, John tells him that he knows the manager is also his fiancée. John and Gary meet up again, and John tells him about a job fishing for oysters, which may not be legal. Gary later sees John at Lassiter's, and learns he is visiting Paul Robinson. |
| 15 September 2017 – 15 May 2018 | Brandon Danker | Nick Bracks | Brandon is a receptionist at Lassiter's Hotel. Gary Canning asks him where John Rotondo is going, as he dropped his wallet, and Brandon tells him that John is going to the penthouse to see Paul Robinson. Mishti Sharma later charms Brandon into allowing her access to the hotel computer system, as she wants to fix a mistake she made in Courtney Grixti's personal training schedule. Brandon tells her to keep an eye out in case Courtney appears. Paul's son, Leo Tanaka, asks Brandon to check out Chloe Brennan's references on her CV. Chloe admits to him that some elements of her CV have been faked and asks him to keep it to himself. She invites him over to Number 32 for a spa and they begin kissing, but are soon interrupted by Jane Harris. Brandon brings Fay Brennan up to the office and they walk in on Chloe kissing Leo. Brandon asks for a pay rise in return for his silence. He begins skipping his shifts and exploiting Lassiters facilities, before he breaks the roof of Paul's car. Leo and Chloe's affar is later exposed to Paul. |
| 18 September 2017 – 11 January 2018 | Louise McLeod | Maria Theodorakis | Louise meets her partner Hamish Roche at Lassiter's Lake and he explains that he has been working hard to secure them the boat. Louise reminds Hamish that they are running out of time, but Hamish tells her to leave it to him, before they start kissing. Louise stays with Hamish on the boat, and they go through their plan to steal the boat and go to Indonesia before 7 November. Hamish thinks that his son, Tyler Brennan, should accompany them when they leave for Indonesia. He also tells Louise that it would be best if she returns to Port Lincoln to earn more money for their trip. Louise returns a couple of weeks later and it emerges that she and Hamish took Russell Brennan's phone from the hospital, where she works as a nurse. Hamish tells her they will soon be together and away from Australia. Louise thinks they are ready to go, but Hamish wants to wait until Tyler has his boat licence. He assures her that he loves her and convinces her to return home, but Louise later takes a temp job at Erinsborough Hospital. Louise suspects Hamish is tiring of her, after catching him with Sheila Canning. She threatens to reveal that they hid the original version of Russell's will, which gives all his children an equal share of the boat. Hamish assures her he loves her. Louise is later rushed to hospital suffering from anaphylaxis and she goes into a coma. Hamish is shown to have her phone and EpiPen. Shortly after Louise wakes up from he come, she leaves the hospital. She flees Erinsborough on the boat, but when she discovers Piper Willis is on board, she locks her in the cabin. Piper frees herself, but Louise does not help her when she falls overboard. Following the discovery of Hamish's body in the spa at Number 26, Louise becomes the prime suspect in his murder. Louise kidnaps Gabriel Smith and hides him in a flat. She asks Mark Brennan for money and a passport, but she is arrested at the exchange. Cassius Grady returns Gabriel to his mother, Paige Smith, while Louise is being questioned. Louise is then taken away by the police. Two months later, Louise is sentenced to 20 years imprisonment. |
| 20 September | Anna Nguyen | Cecilia Zenca | Anna is an assessor for the Lassiter's Hotel star rating review. After Terese Willis shows her around the complex, Anna overhears Courtney Grixti complaining that her ideas were ignored and the hotel is failing. Anna informs Terese and Paige Smith that her assessment puts Lassiter's at 3 Stars. |
| 20 September | Pauline Asp | Nicci Hope | Pauline is a child psychologist, who comes to assess Nell Rebecchi, who is having tantrums and trouble socialising. Pauline recommends that Nell's father Toadfish Rebecchi should also attend therapy. |
| 26 September–13 October | Sam Feldman | Alex Tsitsopoulos | Sam purchases a plant at the local garden nursery, before heading to his office. It emerges that he is Toadfish Rebecchi's therapist. Sam comes to see Paige Smith at Lassiters to ask if it is okay to camp at the lake for Sukkot. Paige later meets him in The Waterhole and tells him he has permission. Toadie comes to Sam and tells him he has made a mistake and hurt his wife's feelings. While setting up his camp by the lake, Sam is approached by Sonya Mitchell, who he has not seen in ten years. They catch up and Sam soon realises that she is married to Toadie. He attempts to contact Toadie, but his phone is switched off. Sonya returns to spend the evening with Sam while he celebrates Sukkot. Toadie finds them together and tells Sonya that Sam is his therapist. Sam and Sonya explain that they met while she was in rehab. Toadie asks Sam if he will use the information from their sessions to ask Sonya out. Sam tells him he will not, while also admitting that he may still have feelings for Sonya. Sam gives Toadie a phone number for another counsellor, and he apologises for not being able to give him a definitive answer about his feelings for Sonya. Sonya encourages Sam to apply for the counsellor position at Erinsborough High and he meets with Elly Conway to discuss it. Elly later informs him that she is also interviewing other candidates. Sam tells Sonya that he has feelings for her. She thanks him for being honest and admits that if they had met after she left rehab, they could have been together, but now she loves Toadie. They say their goodbyes and Sam leaves. |
| 28 September | Dale Osmond | David Meadows | Dale comes by Robinsons motel to drop off a cash donation and he leaves it with Yashvi Rebecchi. |
| 28 September | Jennifer Loh | Lizzie Ballinger | Jennifer is a reporter who interviews Shane Rebecchi about the liveability campaign and his solar-powered lawnmower. |
| 9 October | Driver | Frank Ripa | The driver brings Terese Willis to her wedding ceremony in a vintage Mustang. |
| 9 October | Erson Carbajosa | Roger Neave | Erson is the marriage celebrant at Terese Willis and Gary Canning's wedding. |
| 11 October | Renaye Kelleher | Elizabeth McLean | Renaye drops off a leaflet about medicinal cannabis to Stephanie Scully at the Wellness Centre. |
| 16 October | Justin Hope | Tim Wingfield | Justin empathises with his colleague Gary Canning about his failed wedding to their boss Terese Willis. Gary tells him to focus on the job and they go off to move some furniture. While removing a couch from Terese's office, they meet Paul Robinson, who reveals that he and Terese had sex on the couch. As Paul leaves, Justin tells Gary what his revenge plan would be. |
| 17 October | Leanne Montague | Chiara Farrell | Amy Williams meets with Leanne to discuss a potential return to her Immaculate Cleaning company. |
| 18 October | Simon Gordon | Victor Gralak | Simon tells Amy Williams and Stephanie Scully that he cannot complete the renovation work on the wellness centre without more money, as it is too much of a risk. Amy later tells him that she can pay him cash upfront for at least another week, and Simon agrees to stay. |
| 20 October | Kit Gatsby | Bruno Stepnell | Kit is one of the judges for the Most Liveable Suburb competition. |
| 24 October | Abby Coleman | Herself | The celebrity judge for the Most Liveable Suburb competition. While walking around the lake, Toadfish Rebecchi accidentally splashes her shoes with mud. Abby later asks the liveability committee for their town motto, before letting them know the results will be posted soon. |
| 24 October | Caro Watts | Janine Atwill | Caro enters The Waterhole and notices Gary Canning at the bar, before meeting her friend Elly Conway for a drink and a talk. After Elly leaves, Caro buys Gary a drink and lets him know that she is in town for one night, before slipping him her hotel key card. |
| 30 October 2017 – 15 January 2019 | Snr. Sgt. Christina Lake | Kath Gordon | Hamish Roche comes to the Erinsborough Police Station and asks Lake how he can make a complaint against Constable Mark Brennan for hassling a patient, Louise McLeod, at Erinsborough Hospital. When Lake points out that Louise is in a coma, Hamish tells her that Mark hassled Louise while she was treating him. He adds that Mark was also the cause of his recent hospitalisation and has been following him ever since. Lake tells Hamish that someone will look into it. Lake informs Mark that a harassment complaint has been made against him and another officer will look into the connection between Hamish and Louise. A couple of weeks later, Lake asks Amy Williams to come to the station for questioning about Hamish's death. Lake asks Mishti Sharma to return to the police force and she agrees. |
| 6 November 2017, 22 August–4 October 2018 | Elissa Gallow | Verity Charlton | Elissa visits Aaron Brennan in his Paris hotel room after he has spent the day trying to contact her to find out how she knows Hamish Roche. Elissa explains that Hamish persuaded her to invest in a property deal in Paris, but she lost most of her money and then Hamish took what little she had left. Elissa tells him that Hamish is in trouble with the Australian Taxation Office, which means he could go to prison. Hamish is using Aaron's brother Tyler Brennan to help him skip the country. Aaron recalls that there were charts of Indonesia on the boat and Elissa adds that Hamish talked about going there all the time, as you can live well with limited funds. Elissa comes to Erinsborough to urge her son Cassius Grady to leave for Paris, before anyone learns that he is the one who murdered Hamish. |
| 6 November | Costume waiter | Kirby Belarbi | The waiter works at the Lassiters Hotel Guy Fawkes Gala. |
| 7 November | Senior Constable Fagan | Lana Meltzer | Fagan tells Mark Brennan that he should not be at the hospital looking for information about Hamish Roche, as he is not the investigating officer and has a complaint against him. She refuses to tell him the preliminary cause of death, and warns him to stay contactable. Fagan informs Tyler Brennan that Hamish's death has been ruled as suspicious and that Mark needs to come in for a formal interview. |
| 8 November 2017–5 February 2018, 13–26 October 2020 | Det. Bill Graves | Robert Grubb | Graves is the homicide detective investigating Hamish Roche's death. He starts by interviewing Mark Brennan, who tells Graves that he suspects Hamish had something to do with his father's death. Graves later asks Sheila Canning to come to the station, but her son Gary Canning asks if she can come later, as he is worried that the stress might bring on a heart attack, Graves agrees. He goes to speak with Tyler Brennan, but ends up taking away Hamish's briefcase as evidence. Tyler comes to the station and admits to Graves that he saw Hamish just before he died, but he left him alive and well. Days later, Sheila and Gary tell Graves that they thought each other had killed Hamish. Sheila was at home when Hamish came over, but she left without speaking to him and called Gary to deal with him. Gary later found Hamish's body and thought Sheila had killed him, so he tidied up. Graves tells them that they are still suspects and that Gary is facing an obstruction of justice charge. Graves interviews Mark again, after he becomes the prime suspect due to evidence tampering. Graves attempts to interview Piper Willis about her ordeal at sea after she fell overboard from the Brennan's boat, but she becomes distressed. Tyler admits to Graves that he hit Hamish with the gnome, but he did not see him fall into the spa. Tyler is charged, but then Fay Brennan confesses to killing Hamish. However, Graves and Mishti Sharma discover that she was with Bill Warley at the time. Two years later, Graves investigates the disappearance and suspected murder of Scarlett Brady. While reviewing the evidence, he informs Yashvi Rebecchi that she is being taken off the case, as her boyfriend Ned Willis is the prime suspect. |
| 16 November | Kylie Sayers | Jodine Muir | Kylie overhears Jack Callahan talking to Lyn Scully and tells him he will not have a job for much longer if he carries on preaching religion during his counselling sessions. Lyn tells Kylie that her son is lucky to have a spiritual man at hand, but Jack assures her that Susan Kennedy will look into her concerns. |
| 20 November | Danny Highcazony | Timmy Knowles | Danny arranges to meet Amy Williams at the Back Lane Bar, but he thinks she is Elly Conway, after her profile photo was flipped. Amy and Elly explain the mistake to Danny, who is disappointed that he is not going on a date with Elly. While he is with Amy, Danny constantly looks over at Elly. He later buys Elly a drink and suggests that they have a threesome. Amy and Elly pour their drinks over him and leave. |
| 23 November, 5 December | Jonathan Scarmetti | Eitan Joseph Shimony | Jonathan auditions for the Erinsborough variety night with a dance routine, and judge Toadfish Rebecchi puts him through to the live show. Days later, Jonathan performs his routine during the variety show and receives a round of applause. |
| 27 November | Aleksander Petrov | Kristof Kaczmarek | Aleksander is the head chef at Lassiters Hotel. Manager Terese Willis arranges for Gary Canning to have a trial with Aleksander in the hotel's kitchen. Gary apologises to Aleksander for being slow and then asks him why he has barely spoken to him all day. Aleksander replies that Gary has made several mistakes and the only reason he is in his kitchen is because he is dating Terese. |
| 7 December | Gerritt O'Connell | Peter James Rogers | Gerritt is looking at a wanted poster for Louise McLeod when Piper Willis and Paige Smith approach him. He tells them that he saw Louise at the marina during the Erinsborough fireworks, shortly before he went on a fishing trip. |
