= Piper Willis =

Fictional character from the Australian soap opera Neighbours

- Neighbours character
- Portrayed by: Mavournee Hazel
- Duration: 2015–2019
- First appearance: 16 September 2015
- Last appearance: 3 April 2019
- Introduced by: Jason Herbison
- Spin-off appearances: Hey Piper (2015); Pipe Up (2016); Summer Stories (2016); Neighbours vs Time Travel (2017)
In-universe information
- Occupation: Student; Vlogger; Bookkeeper; Waitress; Receptionist; Garden nursery worker; Legal secretary
- Family: Willis
- Father: Brad Willis
- Mother: Terese Willis
- Stepfather: Paul Robinson
- Stepmother: Lauren Carpenter
- Brothers: Josh Willis
- Sisters: Imogen Willis
- Half-brothers: Ned Willis
- Half-sisters: Paige Smith
- Grandfathers: Doug Willis
- Grandmothers: Pam Willis
- Uncles: Nick Petrides
- Nephews: Gabriel Smith
- Nieces: Matilda Turner

Piper Willis is a fictional character from the Australian soap opera Neighbours, played by Mavournee Hazel. The actress went through a long casting process, which involved her travelling to Melbourne to audition three times. Months later, she was offered the role. Hazel then relocated to the city from Sydney within three days, so she was available for fittings and filming the following week. Ahead of her first episode, Piper was introduced to viewers in a four-part webisode series called Hey Piper. She made her first appearance in the main show during the episode broadcast on 16 September 2015. Hazel chose to leave her role to pursue further acting opportunities, and her final scenes aired on 3 April 2019.

Piper is the youngest child of Brad (Kip Gamblin) and Terese Willis (Rebekah Elmaloglou). Upon her family's arrival in 2013, Piper was often mentioned and said to be living in Canada on an exchange program. Producers held back her introduction to give her parents "a second chapter" ahead of her siblings' departures. Piper is portrayed as being a typical teenager, who is independent, mature, quick witted and loves technology. Hazel did not find the character much of a challenge to portray as she thought that she was similar to Piper. She was also pleased to be playing a character that teenage viewers would be able to relate to.

The character's early storylines revolved around her finding her place within her family, her parents' separation, and her part in a fire at the local high school. Piper has been involved in an on-off relationship with her older neighbour Tyler Brennan (Travis Burns). The pairing has proven popular with viewers, who refer to them by the portmanteau "Typer". Writers have put several obstacles in the couple's way, including Tyler's casual relationship with Piper's half-sister Paige Smith (Olympia Valance). Other storylines have seen Piper bullied by her English teacher Elly Conway (Jodi Anasta), and have a one-night stand with her friend Angus Beaumont-Hannay (Jai Waetford).

== Casting ==
The character had often been mentioned and referred to by her on-screen family since their arrival in May 2013, but she did not appear. Piper was said to be living and studying in Canada as part of a school exchange program. Executive producer Jason Herbison explained that Piper's introduction was held back for when her on-screen parents needed "a second chapter", should her siblings leave the show. Piper's arrival and Mavournee Hazel's casting was announced on 18 August 2015. Of joining the permanent cast, Hazel commented "It's a great feeling to be rewarded with the role of Piper after years of hard work, especially when I fell in love with the character after my first audition."

Hazel flew to Melbourne from her home in Sydney to meet with the casting director and audition for the role. This was followed by two more rounds of auditioning and a waiting period spread over a few months, until she was given the role. Hazel's biggest challenge during the auditioning process was the financial cost of getting to Melbourne, as she was a university student with a small budget. But she was confident that she would secure the role, saying "something just felt right about the whole situation". Hazel relocated to Melbourne within three days to be available for fittings and filming the following week. She told Anthony Graetz of CLIQUE Mag that she wanted to be with Neighbours for a few years, but had plans to relocate to Los Angeles or the UK for further acting work. Hazel made her debut as Piper on 16 September 2015.

== Development ==
=== Characterisation ===
"As soon as I first read her profile she really spoke to me as a product of her generation. It’s great to play a character that a lot of teenagers can relate to and identify with. She talks about a lot of issues I'm sure many teenagers feel."

— Hazel on the aspects of Piper's personality that attracted her to the role.

During the casting process, Hazel and the producers shared a similar vision of what they wanted the character to be and Hazel was "so grateful" that they trusted her to bring Piper's quirkiness and storylines to life. Hazel shares some of the same personality traits with Piper and found that the character was not much of a challenge to portray, as she felt that she "knew this girl, knew what she was about." The actress also found that being so similar to Piper meant that she took criticism of her personally. Hazel wished she had been similar to Piper when she was her age, and she felt that she was slowly growing up to be like Piper.

In an interview with Carena Crawford from All About Soap, Hazel described Piper as having typical traits of a teenager, saying she was "technology-loving, free-thinking, liberated". She also said Piper was mature and intelligent, with "a quick wit and dry sense of humour." In an interview published on the official website, Hazel also described Piper as being fun, having a "cool approach to life" and someone who can be herself "unapologetically". Hazel enjoyed playing a character with a rebellious personality, but pointed out that for all of Piper's maturity and intelligence, she "doesn't have a filter when it comes to her actions."

During an interview for the show's official website, Hazel believed Piper's dream job would be a journalist at BuzzFeed or somewhere similar. She would enjoy voicing her opinions in "a very 21st century environment." Hazel did not think Piper was the type of person who finished high school, instead she would just apply for internships in the industry she wanted to work in. Hazel told Tim Falk of TV Soap that getting to live in Piper's Doc Martens, and the opportunity she got as an actor were the best things about playing Piper. She said that future storylines would see different aspects of Piper's personality. She continued, "There's lots of mischief, some deceit and guilt in store for Piper." Hazel added that viewers would get to see Piper's vulnerable side, as she lets her guard down.

Piper struggled growing up in her elder siblings' Imogen (Ariel Kaplan) and Josh's (Harley Bonner) shadows. Imogen was academic, while Josh excelled at sports, so Piper did not have a strong identity within the family until she went to Canada, where she built up an identity for herself. Unlike Imogen, Piper prefers to discover things for herself instead of learning from a book. Herbison called Piper the "anti-Imogen", as she tries to be different from her family. But Piper does have "the Willis temper", and like her mother, she is very independent. She also shares a strong bond with her father. When Piper meets Paige for the first time, they get along well. Hazel stated, "They both have this sort of sparky, sassy assertion about their character."

Piper was conceived as bisexual, with the character making reference to previous girlfriends on-screen. In 2017. Hazel discussed the positive responses from fans to mentions of this, despite there being no plans to explore the character's sexuality further.

Piper becomes good friends with her neighbour Xanthe Canning (Lilly Van der Meer). Hazel initially thought Piper would not be friends with someone like Xanthe, but she realised that Xanthe brings out Piper's "girlie side", while Piper is always there for Xanthe. Hazel and Van der Meer are also friends in real life. Hazel said their scenes together are fun to film, as all the screaming and laughing comes naturally to them. When asked if Piper could end up dating Xanthe's boyfriend Ben, if they ever broke up, Hazel replied "Even when Xanthe wasn't in the picture Ben and Piper were just mates."

=== Webisodes and introduction ===
Ahead of her first appearance in the main show, the character was featured in a series of webisodes titled Hey Piper, which see her talking to various family members via online video calls. The first episode saw Piper introduced to her half-sister Paige Smith (Olympia Valance), shortly after the Erinsborough tornado. Their first interaction is "very awkward", as Paige mentions several family events that Piper does not know about. In the second episode, Piper calls her grandfather Doug Willis (Terence Donovan) to catch-up with him and go over new ideas for her blog. The third and fourth episodes feature Piper's father, Brad Willis (Kip Gamblin) informing her that he has separated from her mother and has begun a relationship with Paige's mother Lauren Carpenter (Kate Kendall). He later tries to comfort an upset Piper.

Piper arrived home to find her parents in the middle of an argument, which Hazel likened to "something from Jerry Springer!" The actress explained that Piper's siblings had told her about the fights the family had been having, which prompted her return from Canada. Piper believed that she might be "the glue that holds them all together." Hazel also said that Piper did not want to be forced into taking sides in her parents' separation and tried to view things objectively. She just wanted to find her place within the family again, but it was hard due to everything that was happening between Brad and Terese (Rebekah Elmaloglou). While she is out filming for her vlog, Piper meets Brad's new partner, Lauren. She is initially unaware of who Lauren is and finds her to be nice and kind. When Paige later introduced them, Piper was "torn" as she had planned on hating Lauren for breaking up her family.

Piper did not like Terese's attitude towards her marriage, as she thought Brad would be less likely to work through their issues if she kept pushing him away. However, the more time Piper spent with her mother, she began to understand her more. As Piper continues to film her vlog around Erinsborough, she befriends Ben Kirk (Felix Mallard). They have a platonic lunch together and discuss their mutual tastes in music. They later unintentionally caused some trouble at the local car garage. Hazel said that Piper notices that Ben is not like their peers and they form a "really great friendship". The actress added that they are not necessary the best influence on each other. While she continued to settle in, Piper began receiving text messages from her former boyfriend Brodie "Chas" Chaswick (Matt Testro). Hazel explained that Piper ended the relationship shortly before coming home to Australia, but Chas believed the distance was not a problem for them, so they stayed in touch.

=== Erinsborough High fire ===
One of the character's early storylines involved her in a fire stunt at the local high school. During a charity sleep out at Erinsborough High, Piper encourages her new friend Ben to light a piece of paper on fire and set off the sprinkler system. However, it soon causes a "devastating fire" that leaves Piper's mother Terese with burns to her body. Both Ben and Piper are "guilt-ridden" by their actions, and she urges him to keep quiet about their involvement. However, Ben soon confesses everything to his grandparents and the police. As he faces a charge of reckless conduct, Piper struggles with her guilt, especially as she knows that her mother is suffering. While Ben keeps quiet about her role in the incident, Piper eventually tells Lauren that she shares some of the responsibility and Lauren urges her to tell the truth. Instead, Piper suggests to Ben that they run away and he agrees. They initially sleep rough in Erinsborough, before fleeing to Glenrowan, where they get jobs as fruit pickers. Ben begins to struggle with pain from his fractured ribs, which he sustained in an earlier accident, and later collapses.

As Piper prepares to return to her classes for the first time since the fire, she is nervous about the reaction of the other students, leading her to confide in neighbour Tyler Brennan (Travis Burns), who gives her reassurance that she will probably be seen as a hero. Upon her arrival at the school, Piper receives a mixed reaction from her peers. Some of them laud her part in the fire, while others are wary and scared. Piper "swiftly retreats home", where Tyler suggests that she could ask her parents not to send her back to school. When she does return, Piper is given a lighter, which she uses to threaten the students who try to get in her way. Piper's threats are overheard by Susan Kennedy (Jackie Woodburne).

=== Relationship with Tyler Brennan ===
As Piper continues her friendship with Tyler, she soon develops romantic feelings for him. Burns told an Inside Soap reporter that both characters share common interests and are "young, free and spirited". Tyler is oblivious to how strongly Piper feels about him, so when he lets her down gently, he feels satisfied with how he handled the situation. Piper then encourages Tyler to attend a singles' night, in the hope that he will pick her. When they return home, Piper initiates a kiss between them. Burns said Tyler was "shocked" by the kiss, explaining "There's a connection between them, but Tyler has never seen it in a romantic way. He's worried about the age difference, and then there's the fact that Piper's dad Brad is staying with the Brennans – so it could be awkward!" Piper eventually tells Tyler about her feelings for him. While he admits to liking her too, he urges her to stay away, as he feels that he will only cause her trouble. Ignoring his warning, Piper is "crushed" when Tyler refuses to change his mind. She then witnesses him kissing barmaid Courtney Grixti (Emma Lane).

Piper and Tyler continue to share "a mutual attraction", but Tyler wants to have her parents' approval before they start a romantic relationship. Speaking to an Inside Soap columnist, Hazel explained that deep down Piper knows Brad and Terese will not support her relationship with Tyler. Piper tells Tyler that her parents have given them their blessing, in the hope that she will be able to bring them around to the idea. Hazel continued, "She hates lying to Tyler, but worries that he'll break up with her if he learns the truth." While Tyler believes that they have Brad and Terese's approval, he and Piper begin quietly dating and they plan to consummate their relationship on the night of the school formal. Hazel told the columnist that Piper wants to show Tyler how much he means to her. She also said that despite Piper's feminist views and "grungy" style, she was a romantic.

What's on TV's Tess Lamacraft asked Hazel if Piper was really in love with Tyler, and the actress replied that she was. Hazel explained that their relationship had been born out of a friendship and they found that they "just click". She told Lamacraft that they shared an "unspoken attraction and chemistry between them", which felt right. Hazel also found that Tyler helped to ground Piper, while she made him a better person. The pairing of Piper and Tyler proved popular with viewers, and Hazel appreciated the support for their romance, as it made filming with Burns more exciting. She admitted to being surprised by the positive reaction to the couple and said the writers would consider it as they write future storylines. The couple were given the portmanteau "Typer" by fans.

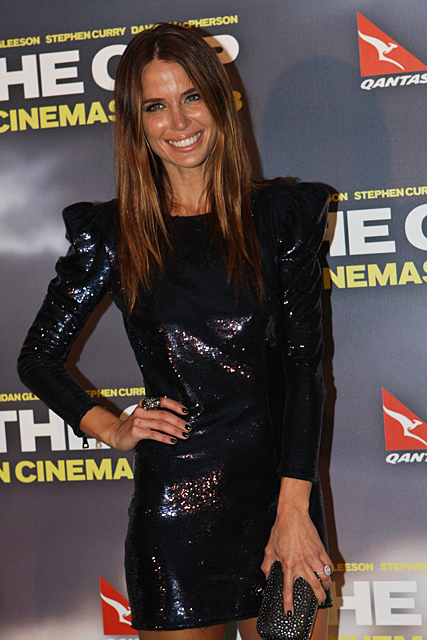
Piper made an enemy of her teacher Elly Conway (actress Jodi Anasta pictured) when she accused Elly of flirting with Tyler.

On the night of the school formal, Piper's parents learn she is planning on losing her virginity to Tyler and Terese bans them from attending the dance together. Piper tries to give her mother an ultimatum that either she attends the formal with Tyler or does not go at all, which "backfires massively" and she ends up with no plans for the night. Piper is also forced to tell Tyler that she lied to him and he "reluctantly" breaks up with her. Shortly after, he speaks to Brad about his feelings for Piper and convinces Terese to change her mind about them dating. Piper later finds Tyler talking to Elly Conway (Jodi Anasta) in The Waterhole bar. A jealous Piper throws a drink over Elly. Upon learning of Piper's actions, Brad takes her to the Kennedys' to apologise to Susan for her behaviour at the formal. Piper is "stunned" when Elly appears, and she learns that Elly is Susan's niece and her new English teacher. Hazel thought Piper's parents were to blame for everything that occurred at the formal. She commented, "Piper isn't responsible for her actions. It was such an unreasonable reaction by Terese."

The formal marked the beginning of a feud with Elly, and Hazel pointed out that the teacher's flirtatious personality was "the epitome of what Piper would dislike in a person." Piper soon notices that Elly holds "a big grudge" against her. Hazel told Daniel Falconer from FemaleFirst that Piper tries to explain to other adults that she is feeling bullied by her teacher, who has been purposely marking her work down and insulting her. However, due to Elly's denials, everyone believes her over Piper. Hazel commented that Piper's resilience eventually forces Susan to investigate and she finds that Piper has been telling the truth. Susan then makes Elly apologise. When asked if Piper and Tyler had any chance of reconciling, Hazel explained that Piper is hopeful, but she also realises that she has "completely lost herself to a guy" which is unlike her. The actress was pleased the writers were giving the characters some time apart.

When Piper discovers Tyler is having a casual relationship with Paige, she gets revenge by playing footage of them having sex in the garage at Brad and Terese's divorce party. In an interview with Daniel Kilkelly of Digital Spy, Hazel told him that Piper was acting on impulse and she thought that Tyler and Paige had to be caught out for lying to Piper. Piper wants them to feel as "humiliated" as she does. Piper also feels guilty when Jack Callahan (Andrew Morley) turns up and sees the footage, as he has feelings for Paige. Her parents express their disappointment in her and Piper finds herself all alone. Hazel told Falconer (FemaleFirst) that Piper is aware that she and Tyler have to rebuild their friendship before they try to begin a romantic relationship again.

=== One-night stand ===
In October 2016, a trailer showing Piper growing closer to friend and neighbour Angus Beaumont-Hannay (Jai Waetford) was released, leading to speculation that they would have sex. It later emerged that Piper would lose her virginity to Angus following another rejection from Tyler. The storyline begins with Tyler supporting Piper through various incidents, including her father's hospitalisation. Piper later attempts to kiss him, but he pulls away, which leaves her hurt and she runs off. Piper meets Angus and they share "a night of reckless teenage fun", where they admit that they might have been better off as a couple, instead of getting their hearts broken by Tyler and Elly respectively. As Angus talks to Piper and says some nice things to her, she is "surprised by his maturity and understanding of the situation", which makes her look at him in a different way. Piper kisses Angus, and they have sex in her car. The following morning, they are found and woken up by Tyler's brother Aaron Brennan (Matt Wilson), leaving them both embarrassed. Hazel stated, "I think there's a bit of regret, but on the surface Piper is very brazen about what's happened. She's really trying to convince herself that she's over Tyler." Aaron informs Tyler what he saw, leaving Tyler devastated, as he had decided that he was ready to commit to his relationship with Piper.

=== Departure ===
On 22 February 2019, Jess Lee of Digital Spy reported that Hazel could be leaving Neighbours, after noticing that she was no longer posting photos of the set to her social media accounts. Comments from her co-stars Elmaloglou, who stated that she misses Hazel, and Takaya Honda also appeared to confirm that the actress had left the cast. Hazel's management also updated her online CV, implying that she had finished filming. Speaking to a Herald Sun reporter, Hazel said she chose to leave Neighbours to further her acting career and challenge herself with new roles. She explained, "It's the end of an era for me, I've learned so much about myself as an actor and I've had to grow up pretty quick. It's hard because you're leaving full-time employment but I was itching to learn more and challenge myself." Spoilers for the week commencing 1 April 2019 confirmed that the character would be leaving on 3 April. After arguing with her sister Imogen, Piper decides to leave town and meet up with Tyler in Adelaide.

== Storylines ==
Piper arrives home from Canada amidst a family argument. The following day, she meets her half-sister Paige in person, and Lauren Turner, her father's new girlfriend. While filming for her vlog, Piper befriends Ben Kirk and they spend the day together. Piper accuses her sister Imogen of not knowing her anymore due to them having so much time apart. Piper also feels increasingly isolated from her family. A fire breaks out at Erinsborough High during a charity sleep out. Piper's mother suffers serious burns and Piper pushes Brad away when it emerges he saved Lauren before Terese. Ben soon confesses to starting the fire, while Piper admits to Lauren that she encouraged him to set the sprinklers off as a joke. Piper and Ben run away and find jobs as fruit pickers. Piper calls Terese to tell her that she is okay. When Ben collapses, Piper sends him to the hospital in a taxi. Her parents find her and take her home. Piper turns to her neighbour Tyler Brennan for advice about returning to school. After enduring the other students calling her names all day, Piper threatens to set to fire to something, causing Terese to ban her from using technology. Piper does some bookkeeping at the garage and develops romantic feelings for Tyler.

Piper befriends Xanthe Canning and tries to keep her out of trouble. Piper's former boyfriend, Brodie "Chas" Chaswick is invited to stay with the Willises when Brad starts coaching him in swimming again. Piper and Brodie resume their relationship in secret, until Josh catches them kissing and makes them tell her parents. When Brad stops coaching Brodie, he and Piper plan to leave for Perth, but Piper changes her mind and calls Tyler to collect her. Josh and Piper's grandfather die from injuries caused by an explosion at the local hotel. Piper's half-brother Ned Willis (Ben Hall) also arrives in town and supports Piper. She initially suspects Brodie caused the explosion, but he has an alibi. Piper and Tyler become close, but Terese will not allow them to date because of the age difference. However, Piper tells Tyler that they have Brad's approval, so they date in secret. Terese agrees to let Tyler accompany Piper to the school formal, but changes her mind when she learns Piper plans to lose her virginity to him that night.

When Piper sees Tyler with a woman at The Waterhole, she becomes jealous and throws a drink over her. She later learns the woman is her new English teacher Elly Conway. Piper learns Tyler is casual dating Paige and she gets revenge on them by showing their sex tape at her parents' divorce party. Piper realises that Elly is deliberately marking her down and when Elly insults her, Piper makes a formal complaint. Her claims are initially not believed, until Susan catches Elly marking Piper down and she is made to apologise. Piper's family forget her birthday, but Tyler takes her to the beach for the day. When Piper later attempts to kiss Tyler, he pulls away. While Piper and Angus are watching fireworks together, they talk about unrequited love and Piper loses her virginity to him. Tyler learns what happened between Piper and Angus and admits that he is disappointed by her actions. Piper announces she is done with their relationship. However, when she learns Tyler is being threatened by Tim Collins's (Ben Anderson) for crashing his car, Piper blackmails Tim into dropping the police charges. Piper and Tyler reconcile at Brad and Lauren's wedding, and finally consummate their relationship. Brad and Terese refuse to support them, due to Piper's age.

When Brad attacks Tyler, he and Piper run away together. They eventually return to Erinsborough and briefly stay at Robinson's Motel, before Leo Tanaka (Tim Kano) invites them to move into his backpackers' hostel. Piper and Tyler struggle financially and she asks her parents for a loan, but they turn her down. Piper decides to apply for emancipation, so she can access social security payments, but changes her mind when Tyler gets a job. Piper buys a fake ID from Bec Simmons (Zenya Carmellotti) so she can enter the bar where Tyler works, but Elly finds her and takes the ID. She asks for the name of the person who made it, but Piper refuses to tell her. When Bec is suspended, another student forces Piper to get her a fake ID. Piper then joins forces with Willow Somers (Mieke Billing-Smith) to make and sell IDs, but Piper is soon caught by Elly. Piper fractures her leg and pelvis when a ute is reversed into the backpackers'. She decides to move back home, while she recovers. Piper challenges acting principal Finn Kelly (Rob Mills) when he makes changes to the school. She organises a student strike, but calls it off when Finn threatens to suspend her. Piper posts a vlog about misogyny and mentions the incident with Chas, which causes him to post several angry comments. The comments soon attract trolls, who attack Piper online. Susan advises against posting a response, but after Piper learns that Xanthe is being targeted too, she posts a new vlog. She continues to reply to her trolls, but later reports them to the administrator of her blog. Piper learns she has been doxxed and that her private videos and photos have been leaked online.

When Piper is about to sit her VCE English exam, Tyler shows her faked text messages designed to show that she is in a relationship with T-Bone. This leads to Tyler and Piper breaking up, but Tyler later learns that the texts were faked by Hamish, so that Tyler would sail away with him. Piper goes to Tyler's boat to make amends with him, but Hamish's ex-girlfriend Louise traps Piper on board and sets sail for Indonesia. Accidentally falling overboard, Piper washes up on a beach and looks for help, but she collapses, suffering from hypothermia. An anonymous man finds her and calls an ambulance, and she is taken to Erinsborough Hospital, where she recovers and reconciles with Tyler. Later she has a panic attack while in a backyard swimming pool. After Tyler is charged with murder, Piper urges Ben to change his story to the police. But after Xanthe confronts her, Piper tells Ben not to lie to the police. The day before Tyler's trial, Piper arranges for them to spend the night in a hotel in the city. She convinces Tyler that they should go on the run, and they change their appearances. However, the police soon turn up at the hotel after receiving a tip off. Tyler and Piper go up to the roof and Tyler jumps across to the next building, leaving Piper behind. Piper decides to follow, but she is left hanging from the edge. Tyler pulls her over and is assisted by a detective, who promptly arrests them both.

Tyler is sentenced to 20 years imprisonment with a non-parole period of ten years. Tyler breaks up with Piper and refuses to see her again. When Terese tells Piper that she informed the police about her and Tyler, Piper stays at Number 24. When Tyler's chair at the Brennan house is sold at a fete, Piper loses her temper and breaks down in tears. Terese persuades her to see a psychiatrist. Eventually Piper goes on a date with Cassius Grady. After Piper learns that Cassius is a keen reader, like herself, and has been highlighting books she obtained at the book exchange, they begin a relationship. Piper later learns that it was Cassius who rescued her on the beach and also rescued Paige's baby. She also learns that Cassius is Tyler's half-brother and that he murdered Hamish. Cassius is imprisoned, where he is assaulted and taken to hospital. Piper misses her period and thinks she might be pregnant and visits Cassius. Terese persuades Piper to take a pregnancy test, which is negative. Piper tells Cassius to fight for a shorter sentence, before saying goodbye. Piper is knocked unconscious by Alice Wells (Kerry Armstrong) while she is at the law office. Alice fakes a break-in and then pretends that she found Piper, who recovers in hospital. Piper supports and encourages Xanthe, who has to move to Queensland for university.

Piper supports Terese's new relationship with Leo, but she is angry when Leo suddenly ends the relationship to date Delaney Renshaw (Ella Newton). When Terese is shot by Delaney's uncle Ivan Renshaw (Michael Shanahan), Piper blames Leo and refuses to let him see Terese. She later overhears her mother calling for Paul. Terese and Leo briefly reunite, but Terese breaks up with him to be with his father Paul Robinson (Stefan Dennis). Piper confronts Paul and Terese for hurting Leo. Piper supports a drunken Leo, as he struggles to get over Terese. Leo tries to kiss Piper, but she pushes him away and he later apologises. Piper and Leo arrange a movie night at the backpackers, which leads to them kissing and having sex. The next day, the two agree not to start a relationship, as Leo is still not over Terese and Piper is still getting over Tyler, but they agree to a casual relationship. Imogen returns to Erinsborough to fill in for Toadie and, after learning Piper is having sex with Leo, demands she tell Terese. Piper tells Leo about Imogen's ultimatum, and he accidentally reveals their relationship during an argument with Terese and Paul. Terese thinks he seduced her daughter out of revenge, before saying she thought Piper had more self respect. Terese later apologises and Piper continues her relationship with Leo.

Piper discovers Imogen is representing Finn Kelly, an attempted mass murderer, and confronts her in front of her family, which leads to an argument between them in the street. Imogen tells Piper that she has just been treading water, and is unhappy with herself. During Josh and Doug's memorial, Piper announces that she needs to leave Erinsborough, so she ends her relationship with Leo. The next day Piper says her goodbyes and leaves for Adelaide where she reunites with Tyler.

== Reception ==
For her portrayal of Piper, Hazel received a nomination for Best Daytime Star at the 2018 Inside Soap Awards. She was also nominated in the "Best Soap Actor (Female)" category at the 2018 Digital Spy Reader Awards; she came in eighth place with 5.2% of the total votes.

Carena Crawford of All About Soap noted, "it doesn't take Piper long to create shock waves when she comes to Erinsborough!" Piper's arrival on UK screens was chosen as one of the top five soap moments by an Inside Soap reporter for 30 September. They stated "the poor girl has an awful lot to catch up on..." Another columnist for the publication branded the character "quirky". Channel 5 dubbed her "elusive" due to her earlier absence from her family. Tess Lamacraft of What's on TV observed that Piper was "headstrong" and a "feisty, free-spirit". When Piper went to spy on Tyler and Imogen's date, a Inside Soap reporter disapproved of her actions, commenting "Not cool Piper, not cool..."

In June 2016, Daniel Kilkelly of Digital Spy named Piper as one of ten rising stars of the soap opera world. He wrote that as the show had delayed the character's introduction for so long, there was potential for her to be "a disappointment", but Kilkelly stated that Hazel's performance "had been a real breath of fresh air and she proved her worth early on with Piper's heartbreaking reaction to Josh's death." Kilkelly hoped Piper's future storylines would be bigger and less focused on romance.

A reporter for TV Soap called Piper and Tyler a "controversial couple". Following the end of their relationship, Burns created a petition asking if the couple should reunite. He planned to show the producers if the petition received 1,500 votes. He received over 1,700 responses from fans, showing their support for the couple. Following the character's exit in 2019, Maddison Hockey of TV Week stated: "Smart, witty and unafraid to stand out from the crowd, Piper was best known for her turbulent relationship with Tyler Brennan (Travis Burns)."
