= Leo Tanaka =

Fictional character from Neighbours

- Neighbours character
- Portrayed by: Tim Kano
- Duration: 2016–2025
- First appearance: 22 September 2016
- Last appearance: 11 December 2025
- Introduced by: Jason Herbison
- Spin-off appearances: Road Trip (2016); Summer Stories (2016); Neighbours vs Time Travel (2017)
In-universe information
- Occupation: Business consultant; Owner of Erinsborough Backpackers; Co-owner of Back Lane Bar; Vineyard owner
- Family: Robinson
- Father: Paul Robinson
- Mother: Kim Tanaka
- Brothers: David Tanaka
- Half-brothers: Robert Robinson; Cameron Robinson; Andrew Robinson
- Half-sisters: Amy Williams; Elle Robinson
- Wife: Krista Sinclair (2025–)
- Daughters: Abigail Tanaka
- Uncles: Glen Donnelly
- Aunts: Lucy Robinson
- Nephews: Jimmy Williams
- Nieces: Harlow Robinson; Isla Tanaka-Brennan
- First cousins: Kiri Durant; Annie Robinson-Pappas
- Other relatives: Kazuko Sano; Hilary Robinson

Leo Tanaka is a fictional character from the Australian soap opera Neighbours, played by Tim Kano. He made his first appearance in the main show during the episode broadcast on 22 September 2016. The character was introduced alongside his twin brother David Tanaka (Takaya Honda), and they arrive in Erinsborough to find their long-lost biological father. Both Kano and Honda auditioned for both Tanaka roles and were later awarded their respective parts. The show's producer Jason Herbison had planned their stories months in advance. The shows writing team meticulously researched the show's history to find a way to introduce the two characters into the show's long-standing Robinson family. Leo and David's search ended in the revelation that the show's villainous character, Paul Robinson (Stefan Dennis) was their father.

Leo is characterised as a flirtatious and charming businessman who takes entrepreneurial risks. He is portrayed as both "ruthless and driven", which Kano believed was his character's personality flaw. He thought Leo was an interesting addition to the Neighbours cast because his attitude clashes with the show's moralistic female residents. Leo's stories have focused on business decisions and romance. He arrives in Erinsborough to start a new business. Despite a history in bar management he decides to open a new hostel for backpackers. Romance stories feature a near incestuous relationship with his half-sister Amy Williams (Zoe Cramond) and more prominent relationships with Mishti Sharma (Scarlet Vas) and Terese Willis (Rebekah Elmaloglou).

Other storylines include Leo getting crushed under concrete, feuds with other characters, and Kano filming overseas in London. Leo and Amy's near romance attracted some media attention, with Alex McCarthy from TV Week branding it "awkward" and a Metro reporter viewing it as "gross". In 2019, Kano's management confirmed he would be leaving the serial and he filmed his final scenes in June. Leo's departure aired on 10 September 2019, but he made a guest appearance from 11 December 2019 to 1 January 2020. In April 2021, it was confirmed Kano had reprised his role as a regular and his return scenes began airing from 15 June of that year. His return storyline sees his ex-girlfriend, Britney Barnes (Montana Cox), give birth to Leo's daughter.

== Casting ==
On 22 August 2016, Neighbours announced its intention to introduce two new regular characters. It was revealed Leo and David Tanaka would be twin brothers played by Tim Kano and Takaya Honda respectively. Kano was delighted to be cast in the show because he believed Leo is "such a great character to play". Leo and David arrive in Erinsborough to solve "a family mystery". The character was billed as having a "superficial facade" whilst being a good-hearted man.

The casting directors prepared themselves for a long audition process. They were adamant they wanted to find actors who looked alike to accurately portray twins. Honda, who plays David recalled the process as being a strange experience which involved many call backs. Each actor originally auditioned for both roles because directors wanted to see who best suited which character. Kano has stated that his first ever audition had him switching character from Leo to David in seconds. Kano praised Neighbours for introducing two ethnic actors into their show. He believed it was "fantastic" that the Tanakas were regular characters with a "really strong plot line".

== Development ==
=== Characterisation ===
"Charming and flirtatious, Leo is a born salesman and has been known to boast that he can “sell snow to the Eskimos”. Behind his flashy exterior lies a morally ambiguous, self-involved human being. Well groomed and image conscious, Leo likes to surround himself with high-end material possessions and is prepared to take big risks to get them."

— An excerpt taken from Leo's character biography hosted by Tenplay.

Leo is characterised as a charming individual who is image conscious and boasts a "flashy exterior". He is a self-involved entrepreneur who is unafraid to take risks to fund his materialistic lifestyle. Leo can behave in an underhanded manner to achieve success. His official character biography states that "he is not averse to using dubious methods to improve his lifestyle and believes people have to spend money to make money." In comparison to his serious minded brother, Leo does not make long-term plans. His career aspirations are driven by his entrepreneurial persona. He managed nightclubs prior to arriving in Erinsborough but decides to start his own business. There are stark differences in the twin's personalities. Leo has been touted as a "shameful opportunist" and "ruthless" in comparison to David who harbours a social conscience. Kano and Honda quickly built a good rapport off-set which helped them create brotherly bond on-screen. Both have other siblings and were able to draw from those sibling rivalries to form the on-screen relationship. Kano told Kerry Harvey from Stuff.co.nz that "he's really cheeky, really playful but under all the layers he's definitely a good guy with a good heart. It's nice to know all that's there and I don't just have to play this ruthless, superficial, bad boy all the time."

Leo is cheeky and charming but quite selfish. Kano believed that his character was flawed because he is "ruthless and driven" and lacks consideration for other character's feelings when achieving his goals. Many female characters in Neighbours are family orientated and Leo's attitude does not fit their strong morals and values. Kano believed this created a "great dynamic and tension" for his character. Leo is surprised by other people's perceptions of him and it proves "a good reflective process". Kano added "for Leo, to come to this down to earth town in Erinsborough where people call you out on your lies, it’s a great learning curve to learn there is more to life than what he was previously used to."

=== Introduction ===
The Tanaka's storyline was planned six months in advance by the show's executive producer Jason Herbison. He was "delighted" with the work Kano and Honda had done, describing watching them as a "very thrilling" experience. Ahead of his first appearance in the main show, the character was featured in a series of webisodes titled Road Trip. The mini-series focuses on the twins' road trip on the way to Erinsborough, where they were joined by Leo's love interest Milly (Eliza Charley). The webisodes were designed to give viewers a chance to watch the "brotherly dynamic" the Tanaka brothers share. In addition they could witness the contrasting personalities they have. Leo made his first screen appearance in the main show during the episode broadcast on 22 September 2016. They arrive to look after their great-grandmother Kazuko Sano (Linda Chin), who has been admitted to the local hospital. Kano revealed that the twins had another motive for being in the area as they were searching for lost relative. When David and Leo spend more time in Erinsborough they befriend Amy Williams (Zoe Cramond), Elly Conway (Jodi Anasta) and Aaron Brennan (Matt Wilson), setting the characters up to become intertwined in one another's storylines.

Leo's main story following his arrival focuses on his and David's search for their biological father. Kano stated that they wanted to solve the mystery of their "interesting and messed-up past". The show's writers played a series of plot twists throughout this story. Initially, David's findings lead him to a Bradley Satchwell (Alfred Nicdao), a local homeless man. He was at the hospital when their mother gave birth and was banned from visiting her. The character is reluctant to reveal details and runs away. But various scenes were included in episodes to suggest Bradley is their father. Months later Leo finds Bradley and bribes him with money to spend time with David. Bradley goes for a medical check up and is again reluctant to talk about his past. Writers introduced a "new twist" into their mystery story by ruling out Bradley as the twins father. David runs a blood test which reveals Bradley cannot be related to them.

Writers developed the paternity mystery further with the introduction of hotel investor Jasmine Udagawa (Kaori Maeda-Judge). She quickly develops a vendetta against Leo and keeps a secret file titled "Tanaka". Amy overhears Jasmine telling Terese Willis (Rebekah Elmaloglou) that Leo could potentially inherit Lassiters and she informs him about the news. This leads Leo to believe he is related to the Udagawa family, who are also Japanese. Jasmine offers the Tanakas $10,000 to leave Erinsborough. He refuses and it leads Leo to suspect that Jasmine's uncle Hiro Udagawa is their father. Amy is featured more frequently in the story and joins Leo in his search to track down Hiro to his last known address. But their search is shortened when they discover Hiro died the previous year.

The show wanted to mislead viewers by publicising a red herring suggesting that historic character Scott Robinson was Leo's father. Jenny Young reprised her role as Kim Taylor after producers rehired her following 31 years off-screen. She is revealed to be David and Leo's mother. The link was made because Kim and Scott had previously been romantically involved. On-screen Kim denies that Scott is the twins father this but is shocked to learn Leo has taken Amy away for a romantic weekend. She rushes to prevent the pair from sleeping together. This makes David think his theory is correct because Kim would not want Amy, who is Scott's relative, to sleep with Leo. This episode brought about the culmination of the mystery storyline as the Tanaka's biological father was revealed. In one final "twist" in the storyline, Scott's brother Paul Robinson (Stefan Dennis) was revealed to be their father. The actors knew about the outcome of the story when it began but were forced to be secretive. Kano told Sarah Ellis from Inside Soap that Kim was not certain Paul was their father but knew he could be. He added that could not wait for the audiences reaction to the shock revelation.

=== The Robinson family ===
Integrating Leo and David into the Robinson family had to be planned out meticulously. The script department did not want the story to appear randomly put together. They had to delve into the show's history and create a link to early characters while staying true to the story. Kano and Honda also had to research the Robinson's family history. Honda told Sophie Dainty from Digital Spy that the Tanaka "family hierarchy is so strange" and Paul's is "insane" because of numerous siblings and children. He said it held such a "great history" and felt honoured that the Tanakas would become part of one of the shows long-standing families.

Prior to the reveal that Paul Robinson is Leo's father, he had been dating Paul's daughter Amy Williams. This meant that Amy was Leo and David's half-sister. The revelation leaves the pair devastated that they nearly consummated their relationship. Kano told Sarah Ellis of Inside Soap that his character had "finally let down his guard" around Amy. He thought he had found "an amazing soulmate" and it was a "huge step" for someone like Leo to be ready to commit to someone. He concluded that the drama leaves Leo stunned. Leo and Amy decide they cannot be together and try to avoid one another. But Amy becomes jealous when Leo dates someone else and is a suspect in the investigation into the backpackers car crash. Her jealousy causes other characters to assume she is guilty. Cramond told a reporter from Tenplay that Leo and Amy's story post-discovery would be a hard journey. She believed they would never really get over what had happened between them. She noted that in time Leo and Amy learn to get along, but "many ups and downs" mar their sibling relationship. One such instance is when Leo takes too much of an interest in Amy's romance with Nick Petrides (Damien Fotiou). He and Paul try to keep the pair apart. Other characters accuse Leo of behaving like a jealous boyfriend rather than a brother.

Leo's relationship with Paul was originally hostile. Paul had tried to damage Leo's backpacker business which caused the initial rift. David embraces his newfound father and despite Paul's best efforts, Leo snubs him on multiple occasions. He makes it clear that he resents Paul for missing 30 years of his life. Honda told Deepika Rajani from OK! that Leo and Paul would struggle to form a bond. He explained that "he's so independent and headstrong and that will lead to some interesting storylines for them." He added that Paul gaining Leo's trust would be an interesting "long road" for the characters. Viewers had often drawn comparisons between Leo and Paul because they have similar personalities. Kano was happy that viewers had likened the two. He told a reporter from TV Soap that "I think he's definitely one to match Paul and it's nice to have someone come in and test Paul as well who's a bit younger and I think they can learn a lot from each other too. It's going to be an interesting dynamic to see how that pans out between the two of them to see whether they'll ever come to an agreement or team up."

Writers later started to build their father and son relationship up. In one story, Leo becomes concerned about Paul's romantic life when he announces his engagement to Courtney Grixti (Emma Lane). Leo views their relationship as unconventional and is suspicious about Courtney's true intentions. Leo decides to befriend Courtney but is wary when she appears to flirt with him. This behaviour is enough for Leo to believe he must put an end to the engagement for Paul's sake. A writer from TV Soap noted that this plot marked the point Leo and Paul's bond became amicable.

=== Relationship with Mishti Sharma ===
"Leo and Mishti = Flirtation Nation from the very first day they met. They’ve come close to getting together on several occasions but the timing has never been quite right. While their friendship has developed, so has the length of the longing looks they give one another, as soon as one of them turns the other way. The chemistry between them is explosive, even when they’re fighting. [...] Leo often reveals a softer, more caring side when around the tough former police officer."

— A reporter from the official Neighbours website assesses the early stages of their relationship.

Writers decided to pair Leo with Mishti Sharma (Scarlet Vas) and their relationship takes a while to form. Initially, the pair befriend each other but Mishti's reluctance to discuss her past causes problems. Vas told Alison James from Soaplife that "Mishti starts dropping her guard and she begins to confide in him." Writers also began including Leo's more caring side of his persona when he featured in scenes with Mishti. The pair would contemplate a relationship on numerous occasions, but change their minds and remain friends.

Producers finally decided to unite the pair in September 2017. When Amy wants Leo to sell his share of the Robinsons hotel she concocts a plan to get him and Mishti together. She assumes that Mishti will be able to convince Leo to sell. Mishti is unaware of Amy's scheme and Leo is furious when he finds out. But Mishti later convinces him of her innocence and they decide to begin a relationship. Problems soon followed focusing on the issue of trust. Mishti becomes secretive over her rogue investigation into the death of Hamish Roche (Sean Taylor). She lies about her whereabouts and Leo discovers the truth. This caused Leo to believe he can no longer trust Mishti and they nearly break-up.

Leo spends more time with Mishti's family and argues with her sister Dipi Rebecchi (Sharon Johal). She believes that Leo has ill-advised her husband Shane Rebecchi (Nicholas Coghlan) in order to benefit from his urine powered generator. This is not true and Mishti is left with the task of solving the rift. Johal revealed that she and Kano get along well off-screen so they really enjoyed filming the brief feud and pool scenes.

In March 2018, Neighbours confirmed a new pregnancy story featuring Mishti and Leo. Leo is hurt at the Robinson Heights development site. A slab of broken concrete falls on top of him and leaves him trapped. Mishti is called out to the incident and is shocked to find Leo. Vas told Ellis (Inside Soap) that Mishti is worried and can only reassure her boyfriend. But he is taken to hospital and recovers. The events lead Mishti to reveal her pregnancy. Vas explained that Mishti and Leo's relationship is still new, so she is unsure of how he will react. They had not thought about having children so are unsure about keeping it. But their families discover their news and are excited. The actress added "she and Leo aren't even sure they want to have the baby yet - but they're forced to go along with the family's celebrations." Their next problem is telling Paul because Mishti is nervous about his approval. To her surprise he is supportive. Vas told Sally Brockway from Soaplife that Mishti thinks everything will be okay once Paul accepts the news. But she warned of many "twists and turns" for her relationship with Leo. It was later announced that Neighbours had planned a miscarriage story for the pair.

Writers planned a break-up story for Leo and Mishti which begins when Leo invites her friend Monique Hughes (Madeleine Vizard) to stay. She worked with Mishti and Zander at the police academy and expresses an interest into Leo's business. She discovers that Lassiter's have sold alcohol to Xanthe Canning (Lilly Van der Meer) who is under the legal age to drink. Monique blackmails Leo and requests money in order for her not to report his family business. Kano told Stephen Downe (TV Week) that "It's pretty shocking, he doesn't know how to take her." Leo realises that Monique has the upper-hand and he is left ponder whether or not to meet her demands. Kano told Digital Spy's Daniel Kilkelly that he was upset that Leo and Mishti had broken up because they had just begun to find trust in their relationship. He added that Mishti showed the audience a different side to his character and hoped they would reconcile in the future.

=== Chloe Brennan ===
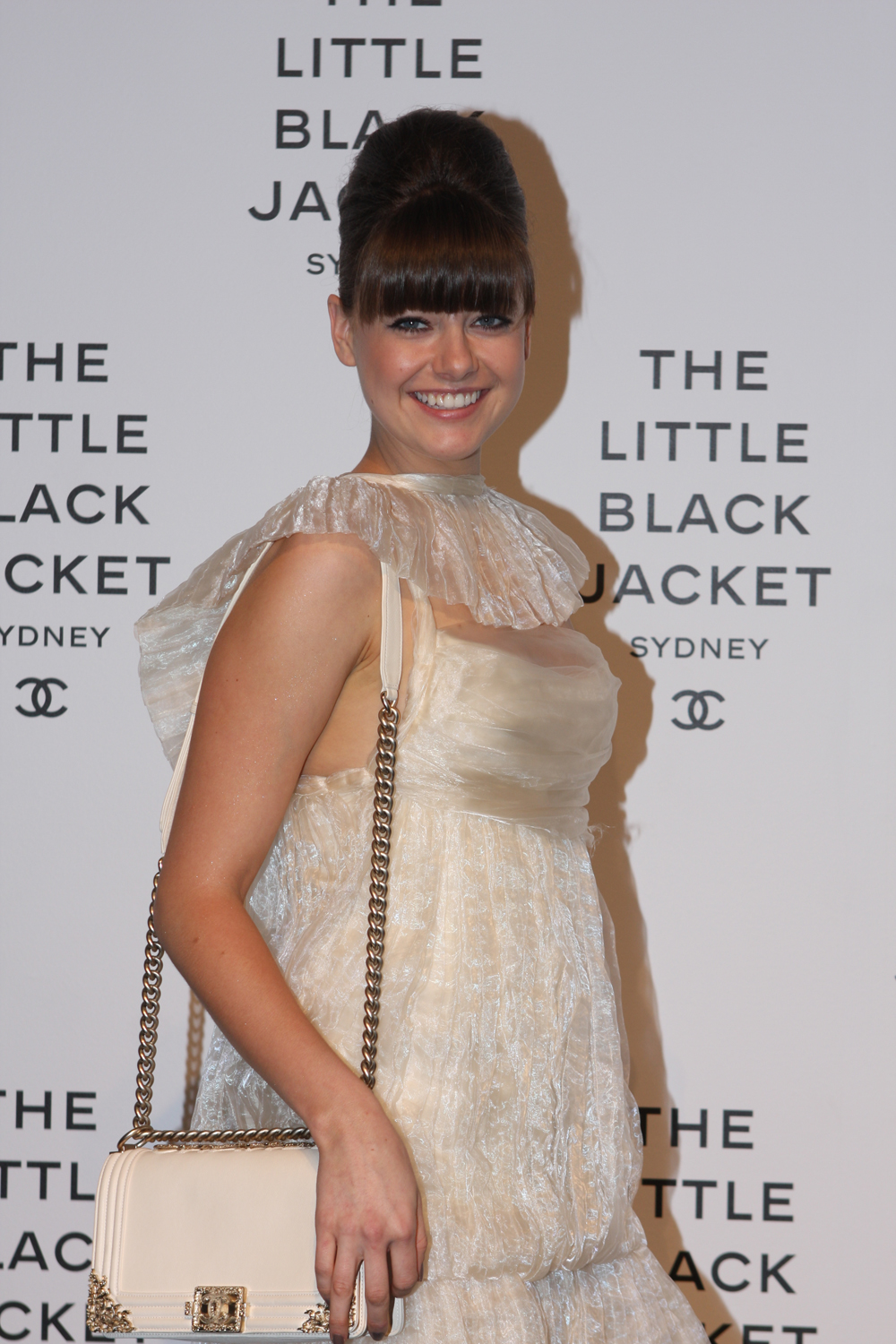
April Rose Pengilly plays Chloe Brennan.

Leo embarks on a casual relationship with his personal assistant Chloe Brennan (April Rose Pengilly). The story begins when his boss Terese Willis (Rebekah Elmaloglou) wants to fire Chloe. He tries to tell her but she comes up with a new business idea which has potential. When Mishti breaks-up with Leo he wants fun and thinks Chloe will be a good distraction. A Neighbours publicist told Claire Crick from Soaplife that Leo realises that Chloe is not just the "bolshy" character she presents herself as and tries to seduce her. They added that Chloe initially refuses because she wants to behave professionally. Following a kiss, Chloe decides to seduce Leo and they have sex at work. David and Chloe are caught being intimate by her mother Fay Brennan (Zoe Bertram), who is not impressed by her conduct at work.

Kano believed his character's casual arrangement with Chloe provided a "great distraction and rebound". He described it as a "really nice, light and fun storyline" following a turbulent time in Leo's life. Chloe is the type of woman Leo used to date during his time working the Sydney club scene. But Kano believed that Leo just wants fun, despite a potential relationship and added that it was another reminder of how alike Paul he is. Their affair does have consequences for them professionally because Lassiters policy tries to dissuade colleagues from pursuing each other romantically. Kano added "that's what makes it so exciting. The possibility of getting caught creates a thrill."

=== Relationship with Terese Willis ===
Writers developed Leo's next romance with his boss Terese Willis. She is also Leo's father's ex-girlfriend and Paul still loves her. Elmaloglou was shocked when producers told her about the relationship because she could not imagine them together. But she said that the story received positive feedback from the viewers. Kano told Sarah Ellis from Inside Soap that Leo is "majorly guilty" for developing feelings for Terese and betraying Paul. Initially Terese does not reciprocate his feelings but Paul places Leo under Terese's mentorship and they spend more time together. Kano explained that Terese is "smart, strong and beautiful" and "business minded" which are the qualities Leo likes in women. Leo spends time with Terese in the city and she realises she likes him. Kano add "there's a really nice, intimate moment" and they get to know each other better. This gives Leo hope and he is allured to her caring nature. Kano was excited about the story because he believed it is controversial. He thought it made sense that the writers had both father and son falling in love with the same woman. Kano added that Leo would get with Terese regardless of Paul and then "just pray his dad would forgive him."

The pair conduct their relationship in secret to avoid hurting Paul. Kano said that Neighbours required himself and Elmaloglou to film "the raunchiest scenes we’ve done on the show yet". Elmaloglou told Ellis that Leo and Terese genuinely love each other. Terese is initially flattered because a younger man likes her but she realises he is a good person. Writers continued to include Paul in the story, which causes problems for them. The actress stated that Terese would always be in love with Paul and Kano felt that left Leo always feeling insecure. The actor explained that there was an inevitable showdown between Leo and Paul, while Elmaloglou warned that "all hell will break loose" when Paul discovers the truth.

Leo's criminal past with the Renshaw family is explored in late 2018. Producers introduced Delaney Renshaw (Ella Newton) and she blackmails him. Kano explained that Delaney had been in love with Leo since he worked for her family. She knows he is the police informant that helped land her father in prison and blackmails him "hoping that he'll fall in love with her." Leo had been estranged from Paul since he discovered his deceit with Terese. Kano stated that Delaney's presence helps bring him close to his father again. Delaney makes threats about Terese which makes Leo realise he needs to protect her. The actor added that "if Terese knew what was going on, it would put her in danger, Leo has to try to find a way to keep his partner safe." Leo dumps Terese and creates fakes a relationship with Delaney to keep her happy. This leaves Terese hurt and questioning whether she should be with Paul.

Delaney's uncle Ivan Renshaw (Michael Shanahan) locates Leo and pulls a gun on him. Terese lunges in front of Leo to protect him and takes the bullet. She is rushed to hospital and holds other characters hostage in Harold's cafe by Raymond Renshaw (Frank Magree). Terese survives and reunites with Leo, but she cannot stop thinking about Paul. Terese decides to continue with Leo until he proposes marriage in public and embarrasses her. Kano explained that Terese's shooting and a family friend's cancer diagnosis makes him feel that life is short and prompts him to propose. Terese then decides to end their relationship and confesses her love for Paul. Leo walks in on them kissing and feels betrayed. The actor branded it the "ultimate humiliation" and believed that being betrayed by your girlfriend and father is the worst form. He added that it was a sad end to the relationship and that Leo never imagined Terese reuniting with Paul.

=== Departure and returns ===
In 2019, Kano's management confirmed that he would be departing Neighbours that year to pursue new roles in Hollywood. On 10 July, Kano told a reporter for the Herald Sun, "I'm really excited for a change. It's been two weeks since I finished and I've had a few meetings with people from LA. Neighbours is such a good launching pad and you have to be really adaptable. I'm looking forward to new roles." The reporter added that following his exit, Kano would return to the serial for a stint later in the year. Kano's exit scenes aired on 10 September 2019. Leo leaves Erinsborough without telling anyone, after his part in the reappearances of Paul's former wives is revealed. Leo teamed up with his half-sister Elle Robinson (Pippa Black) to test Paul and Terese's relationship ahead of their wedding. Kano later said that Paul and Terese being together was the reason Leo left Erinsborough, as he was still in love with Terese. The character returns for a short guest stint on 11 December 2019, after learning that his brother, David, has been seriously injured and needs a kidney transplant. However, Leo is soon informed that he is not a match. He also attempts to put Amy off from contacting her son, Jimmy Williams (Darcy Tadich), due to pressure from his father.

=== Reintroduction ===
In April 2021, it was confirmed that Kano had reprised the role after he was photographed with other cast members entering the Neighbours studios. A publicist from the show told Digital Spy's Kilkelly that Kano returned to filming in March 2021 for a "recurring guest role". The character's return scenes aired on 15 June 2021. The following month, Kano confirmed that Leo would be added back to the opening titles. When asked if he would like to stay on permanently, he said "Oh yeah, I'd absolutely love to. It's been so nice being back and working with everyone. I really love the storylines that we're doing. As an actor, you get to explore all these layers and levels of emotions. It's a really fun story to be part of and to see the wild things the writers and producers are coming up with. I'd love to stay – it doesn't feel like work at all." Of Leo's return to Erinsborough, Kano explained that he has been successful in New York, but some relationship issues has led to him wanting to come home and "reset". He also wants to look after David, who is expecting a baby with surrogate mother Nicolette Stone (Charlotte Chimes). Leo has heard stories about her from Paul and he wants to see for himself what she is like. Shortly after his arrival in Erinsborough, Paul offers Leo a job at Lassiters, but Leo him down in order to go into business with Paul's "nemesis" Pierce Greyson (Don Hany) instead. Kano told Inside Soap's Sarah Ellis that there is "a really interesting dynamic between these three men", especially as Pierce and Paul both have people they love involved with Nicolette. Kano said the men form "a secret alliance" in order to protect David and Chloe, who is dating Nicolette.

Kano said that Leo is excited about becoming an uncle, but after meeting Nicolette, he instantly becomes suspicious of her and her motivations. When she makes some comments about the baby being hers and Chloe's, it raises some "red flags" with Leo. He wants to protect Chloe too and teams up with her former husband Pierce to keep her away from Nicolette. Kano explained to Ellis: "Leo buys into Pierce's vineyard, then hires Chloe to work there. He finds a reason to stick around in Erinsborough, so that he can keep an eye on things. However, then as the storyline goes on, you start to see that Leo has a few skeletons in his closet that will come into play as well. That's why I was really drawn to this storyline, and to coming back to Neighbours." Another draw for Kano was the chance to work his former co-stars again, particularly Pengilly as they are close friends. He also enjoyed filming on-location at the vineyard.

In February 2023, Leo's return as series regular was announced as part of the series' resumption, with new episodes due to air from later in 2023.

== Storylines ==
Leo blocks Amy's truck in and tells her he will not be long when she complains. While he is sat in The Waterhole, Leo watches on as Aaron plays Terese and Paul against each other. Leo is surprised when David is caught looking at hospital records in a bid to find their father. Terese hires Leo to act as a consultant for Lassiter's, in the hope that he will improve takings at The Waterhole. Leo also secures an apartment for himself and David. Aaron invites Leo to the Back Lane Bar, along with David, Amy and Elly, who Leo knows from his job in venue management. Aaron leaves early after realising Leo is straight. Leo flirts with Amy. When she goes on a date with David, Leo tells her she is with the wrong brother. Paul attempts to blackmail Leo, after learning he managed a nightclub that was involved in money laundering, but Leo tells him it is public knowledge. Paul then offers to pay Leo to ruin Terese's business. Terese catches Leo out and he saves his job by agreeing to spy for Terese. After Jasmine tries to bribe Leo into leaving he becomes convinced he is related to the Udagawas and possible heir to the Lassiter's hotel inheritance. This later turns out to be untrue as Kim denies it.

Leo wins the bid for the Men's Shed tender, which he plans to turn into a backpackers' hostel, with Tim Collins (Ben Anderson) as a partner. Leo finds it difficult to work with him. Tim tries to make Leo carry out illegal activities in exchange of selling his share. Amy offers to invest in the backpackers and the two grow closer. Leo takes Amy away for the weekend where they open up about their feelings for each other. As they are about to have sex, Paul arrives and announces that he is the Tanaka twins' father. Leo and Amy admit that they are in love, but try to avoid each other in the wake of the revelation. Leo buys Amy out of her shares in the hostel. He also attempts to move on by dating Mishti. Paul tries to make amends with Leo, but he tells Paul to keep his distance. After Amy's ute is driven into the Backpackers, Leo helps to rescue an injured David. Leo begins to worry that he is bankrupt because he never got the backpackers insured. He knows he cannot afford the repairs so Paul buys Leo's backpacker hostel. Leo makes it clear to Paul that his gesture has not changed anything between them. When Sonya Rebecchi (Eve Morey) admits that she was responsible for the crash, he orders her to sell her nursery to obtain compensation for the damage. Her friend Mark Brennan (Scott McGregor) pays Leo $10,000 for him to leave Sonya alone.

Leo is alarmed when his old friend Mannix Foster (Sam Webb) arrives. He puts him up at the Robinsons motel and owner Steph Scully (Carla Bonner) notices Mannix behaving strangely. She demands that Leo tell her the truth and Mannix leave the premises. He refuses and tells her that he will sort the problem out. When Mannix is stabbed following an altercation, he tells Leo not to involve the police. Mannix blackmails him using his past secrets involving a family he used to work for. Leo begs David to help treat Mannix outside hospital grounds and therefore risking his career. David is upset that Leo would make him compromise his career and refuses to speak to him for a while. Paul discovers the situation and threatens Mannix into leaving Erinsborough for good. Paul's actions lead to him and Leo bonding and Leo agrees to go into business as a shareholder of Robinsons. When Steph and Amy want to transform the motel into a wellness center for cancer patients, Leo and Paul refuse. They snub Steph's suggestions of a buy out and this forces Amy to concoct a plan. Mishti convinces Leo to reconsider his stance, but is angry when he discovers that Amy has planned it. Leo changes his mind when he realises Mishti was oblivious to Amy's scam and Steph gains control of Robinsons.

Leo becomes concerned that Courtney is taking advantage of Paul when she flirts with him. He tries to seduce Courtney to prove she is untrustworthy. Mishti witnesses a kiss between the pair and breaks up with Leo for scheming. Paul is angry when he discovers the truth, but admits that his relationship with Courtney is sham and an attempt to snare his former lover Terese. Mishti forgives Leo but he becomes angry when he discovers that Mishti has been keeping secrets. The pair have a conversation and agree to be honest with each other in future. Leo offers Shane business advice for his urine-powered generator which proves unhelpful when his client drops out of their deal. Feeling he is to blame, he offers Shane a compromise, that he will install a generator at the backpackers but is not willing to pay for it. Dipi is furious and sees this as an attempt at scamming Shane for a free generator. The pair argue over the incident but she later realises he was being genuine. While at the construction site of the Robinson Heights housing development, Leo is crushed by a concrete slab. He is found by Mark and taken to hospital where he soon recovers. Mishti then tells him she is pregnant. She contemplates an abortion but loses the baby anyway. Leo decides to invite Mishti's friend Monique to stay. She blackmails Leo, requesting ten thousand dollars in exchange for her silence regarding under age drinking occurring at Lassiters. He refuses and hires a private investigator to look into Moniques past. He discovers that Monique and Zander are both corrupt officers who were linked to gang crime. When Mishti discovers the truth she ends their relationship.

Leo is promoted to the temporary manager of Lassiters while Terese is forced to take an extended holiday. Chloe is hired to work as his assistant but an attraction develops between them. Terese asks Leo to fire Chloe but he asks her to reconsider when he notices how business minded she is. He begins a sexual relationship with Chloe which is later discovered by Paul and Terese. Leo is demoted for his actions but he and Chloe agree to end their affair. Terese begins to mentor Leo and forces him to do basic staff duties. Terese reveals that she wants him to know every aspect of the business. When Mishti is the victim of harassment from Dilhan Ozdil (Kyle Hazebroek), he tries to force him to break his bail conditions by trying to fight him. The plan backfires and he accidentally punches Ned Willis (Ben Hall). Mishti forgives Leo for his interference in the case.

Leo unsuccessfully tries to matchmake Paul and Terese, but develops a crush on Terese himself. When Terese discovers Leo's feelings, she ends their mentorship, but the attraction between them grows and they have sex on the day of David and Aaron's wedding. They begin a secret fling, which is eventually discovered by a furious Paul; he reacts by evicting Leo from the penthouse, firing him from Lassiter's and sabotaging the Backpackers. Leo moves in with Terese and their relationship strengthens, despite continual opposition from Paul. With Amy's help, Leo schemes to bring Jane Harris (Annie Jones) back to Australia, hoping that a new relationship will distract Paul from his tirade against his family. Their plan is successful, and Jane convinces Paul to forgive Leo. Soon after, Delaney comes to Erinsborough, hoping to reconcile an old attraction with Leo from Sydney. Delaney is aware that Leo was the police informant on her criminal family, so blackmails him into ending his relationship with Terese and starting a new one with her.

Delaney's uncle Ivan Renshaw (Michael Shanahan) shoots at Leo, but Terese jumps in front of him and is hit by the bullet. Piper blames Leo for getting Terese shot and refuses to let him see her at the hospital. When Delaney's father Raymond Renshaw (Frank Magree) holds a group of hostages at Harold's, Leo goes in to reason with him and Raymond is arrested. Leo then discovers that Mannix is alive and has been helping Delaney. Delaney apologises to Leo for what her family have done before she leaves town. Leo and Terese get back together and Leo proposes to Terese, but she turns him down and then breaks up with him. Leo later walks in on her kissing Paul. He throws a large Valentine's Day's display across the complex, which hits Vera Punt (Sally-Anne Upton). She decides to sue Lassiter's. Leo also gets drunk and makes a scene in the street when he begs Terese to take him back. He finds comfort in his friendship with Piper, but when he tries to kiss her, she pushes him away.

Leo struggles to get over Terese and forgive Paul, but he continues to hang out with Piper. During a movie night, they end up kissing and having sex. They agree to have a casual relationship, but it is soon discovered by Piper's sister, Imogen Willis (Ariel Kaplan), who demands Piper tell Terese. When Leo is making an apology to Vera, he argues with Paul and Terese, and then tells them he has moved on and is with Piper. Terese accuses Leo of seducing Piper out of revenge. Leo apologises to Piper and they continue their arrangement. Leo accompanies Elly to a hospital appointment, where she learns she is not pregnant. He advises her to keep it from Mark and try and get pregnant in the meantime. Piper breaks up with Leo ahead of her departure from Erinsborough. Leo learns from Terese that Piper has reunited with Tyler after her departure and Leo starts drinking again. Leo later moves in with David and Aaron. Leo befriends Roxy Willis (Zima Anderson) and they buy the Back Lane Bar together, although he later learns that Vance Abernethy (Conrad Coleby) is his business partner, as Vance gave Roxy the money. Vance later takes off with his share of the proceeds and his cousin scams Leo out of the rest of his money, forcing him to sell the bar. Paul and Terese get engaged, leading Leo to team up with his half-sister, Elle Robinson (Pippa Black) and four of Paul's former wives to test Paul and Terese's relationship. David is disappointed when he learns of Leo's involvement. Leo decides to leave Erinsborough for New York City without saying goodbye, leaving David a note explaining he needs to start afresh elsewhere. He returns a couple of months later, after learning that David needs a kidney transplant. Leo is tested, but he is not a compatible match. Leo comforts Paul when he breaks down in fear for David's life. David pulls through after their criminal half-brother Robert Robinson (Adam Hunter) donates his kidney. Leo later returns to New York with Amy and Jimmy.

Leo returns the following year to meet Aaron and David's surrogate Nicolette Stone. Paul asks Leo to be his business manager once again, as he has been having financial difficulties, but Leo turns the offer down and announces that he is buying Pierce Greyson's (Don Hany) winery. Pierce later shares his concerns about Nicolette, her relationship with Chloe, and the baby with Leo, who decides to keep an eye on her in order to protect David and Chloe. He offers Chloe a job at the vineyard helping with a revamp, which she accepts. He also gives Pierce's son Hendrix Greyson (Benny Turland) a job in the kitchen. While they work together, Leo gets Chloe to open up about her relationship with Nicolette and she admits there have been some issues between them. Hendrix notices Leo's interest in Chloe and warns him against meddling in her relationship with Nicolette. Leo fabricates a reason to fire Hendrix, who warns David that Leo poses a threat to Chloe and Nicolette's relationship. David warns his brother not to break up Chloe and Nicolette, worried about the potential repercussions for their surrogacy arrangement. Chloe increasingly confides in Leo about her relationship doubts and Paul deduces that Leo has fallen for her. Chloe and Nicolette become engaged but Chloe regrets accepting her proposal, prompting her to get drunk with Leo and stay with him at the vineyard overnight. The next morning, Chloe is left believing that she has had sex with Leo and confesses to Nicolette. She is devastated and blames David and Aaron when she discovers that they knew about Chloe's doubts and growing connection to Leo. Although Leo clears up that he did not have sex with Chloe, Nicolette flees Erinsborough just weeks before her due date, leaving David frantic about his unborn child. He blames Leo and Chloe and punches his brother when they argue about David and Aaron's decision to make Nicolette their surrogate. Chloe is furious when she realises that Leo has been manipulating her against Chloe and tells him there is no romantic future between them. After weeks of estrangement, Paul and Terese help David and Leo make peace with one another. Paul tracks down Nicolette and brings home baby Isla Tanaka-Brennan (Mary Finn) to a relieved David and Aaron. Leo leaves for Sydney after meeting his niece for the first time.

Nicolette returns to Erinsborough with another baby, Isla Tanaka-Brennan (Axelle Austin), who she reveals to be David and Aaron's real child. Leo flies back to Erinsborough to comfort David. Nicolette reveals to him that the baby David and Aaron originally received is actually named Abigail Tanaka and is Leo's daughter. Leo and his ex-girlfriend, Britney Barnes, conceived Abigail whilst in New York and Britney gave Abigail up after having post-natal depression. Leo meets up with Britney in the hospital and gets to know his daughter. He and Britney decide to start over as friends for Abigail, but begin arguing over small things. Britney tells Leo that she is struggling to bond with Abigail in Erinsborough and wishes to move back to New York. Leo suggests moving to New South Wales, where his family is. Britney agrees, and Leo and Abigail say goodbye to David, Aaron, Paul and Harlow, before he, Britney and Abigail move to Wollongong. Leo returns a month later to oversee business at the winery. He initially accepts silent investment from Paul to help turn the winery into a whisky distillery, but pulls out of the deal when Paul begins meddling in his business affairs. He hires his uncle, Paul's estranged brother Glen Donnelly (Richard Huggett), to manage the new venture. Britney and Abigail join Leo in Erinsborough for Christmas and stay with him. Britney helps pull investment into Leo's business and they reestablish their romantic connection, with Leo asking Britney to attend Roxy and Kyle Canning's (Chris Milligan) wedding with him. They kiss after the ceremony, but Britney is killed when the Flamingo Bar is destroyed by a falling pylon.

Now a single father, Leo initially devotes his time to Abigail and shrugs off help from his family. However, after Abigail suffers a minor accident, he loses his confidence and asks David and Aaron to take over her parental responsibility. Although on the brink of formalising the arrangement, Leo realises he wants to continue taking care of Abigail after a conversation with Chloe. Leo continues to look after Abigail and becomes close with his cousin, Kiri Durant (Gemma Bird Matheson). Leo later attends Toadie Rebecchi (Ryan Moloney) and Melanie Pearson's (Lucinda Cowden) wedding and reception party on Ramsay Street.

== Reception ==
Alex McCarthy from TV Week branded the relationship and sibling revelation between Leo and Amy an "awkward" storyline. Katie Baillie Metro believed a hook-up between the pair would be "really gross", adding they had been "dancing around the fact they are in love with each other". She later added that she "couldn't watch" as the pair shared a romantic meal. She concluded that the reveal was "one heck of a truth bomb." Neela Debnath from the Daily Express branded the story a "controversial incest plot" and "explosive twist". Claire Crick from Soaplife said "Leo Tanaka and Mishti Sharma are certainly something of a power couple. Not only are they both massively successful in their beloved jobs, but they also make a beautiful pairing to boot." Melanie Blake of The People said "Paul's cute son Leo clearly has an eye for his future step-mum." The Liverpool Echo included Leo working for Paul in their "pick of the day" feature. Their writer added that Leo was playing with fire. Digital Spy's Comor McMullan criticised Leo's revenge plot against Paul and Terese. He bemoaned the repetitiveness of Leo and Paul constantly seeking revenge against one another. He added that while Kano played Leo's anger "excellently [...] these Robinson men need to find healthier ways to deal with their feelings."
