= Aaron Brennan =

Fictional character from the Australian soap opera Neighbours

- Neighbours character
- Portrayed by: Matt Wilson
- Duration: 2015–2025
- First appearance: 16 June 2015
- Last appearance: 11 December 2025
- Introduced by: Jason Herbison
In-universe information
- Occupation: Exotic dancer; Bodyguard; Executive assistant; Social media manager; Gym owner; Bar manager
- Father: Russell Brennan
- Mother: Fay Brennan
- Brothers: Mark Brennan
- Sisters: Chloe Brennan
- Half-brothers: Tyler Brennan
- Husband: David Tanaka (2018–2024)
- Adoptive daughters: Isla Tanaka-Brennan
- Nieces: Abigail Tanaka

Aaron Brennan is a fictional character from the Australian soap opera Neighbours, played by Matt Wilson. The actor originally auditioned for the role of Tyler Brennan and participated in a long casting process, during which he sent the producers a recording of himself performing a scene, before attending an audition. Producers ultimately selected Travis Burns to play Tyler, but created the additional role of Aaron for Wilson. Like Tyler, Aaron was introduced as the brother of established character Mark Brennan (Scott McGregor). Wilson relocated from Sydney to Melbourne for filming, and debuted four months after Tyler's arrival, on 16 June 2015. The character was initially intended to be a guest part, but due to Wilson's "endearing quality", he was promoted to the full-time cast.

Aaron is portrayed as a confident, happy, occasionally naive, optimist. He was initially shown to be closer to Tyler than Mark, but the brothers were bonded when their estranged father was introduced. The character had a unique entrance to the show as an exotic dancer performing at The Waterhole. Wilson took dance lessons ahead of his first scenes. Aaron has embarked on various careers throughout his duration, including bodyguard and social media manager. Aaron is openly gay, and he has formed relationships with established regular Nate Kinski (Meyne Wyatt), despite initially having nothing in common, and later Tom Quill (Kane Felsinger) and David Tanaka (Takaya Honda). The character has received a positive response from television critics and viewers. He was named Best New Male Character of 2015 by a columnist for Soap World. Wilson remained as a regular cast member until the show's finale episode, which was broadcast on 28 July 2022. Aaron returned in the Amazon Freevee revival of Neighbours on 13 November 2023. He departed the series on 1 September 2025, shortly before its conclusion. Aaron made a return for the final episode on 11 December 2025.

== Casting ==
On 17 May 2015, it was announced actor and model Matt Wilson had joined the cast as Aaron Brennan, the middle brother of established characters Mark Brennan (Scott McGregor) and Tyler Brennan (Travis Burns). Wilson was given the role of Aaron after a long casting process, which started with Wilson recording himself performing a scene and sending the footage to the producers, who then invited him to attend an audition. During the lengthy waiting period, Wilson watched the show "religiously", which made him want to be a part of the cast even more. Months after his audition, Wilson was sent an email informing him he had been cast. In 2022, Wilson revealed that he had originally auditioned for the role of Tyler, but after the role went to Burns, producers created the role of Aaron for him. Of joining the cast, Wilson said "It's surreal. This stuff is part of your living room growing up and never in my wildest dreams did I think I would have this chance." Wilson relocated from Sydney to Melbourne, where the Neighbours studios are located. He made his debut appearance as Aaron during the episode broadcast on 16 June 2015. Executive producer Jason Herbison later revealed that Aaron was only ever intended to be a guest character, but Wilson's "endearing quality" led him to be promoted to the full-time cast.

== Development ==
=== Characterisation ===
In his fictional backstory, Aaron left his hometown of Port Lincoln shortly after Mark's departure. Aaron had not seen his brothers in six years, as he was living on the other side of the country, but they had kept in contact and stayed close. Aaron gets bored doing the same job every day and he eventually realised that working down the mines was not something he wanted to do anymore. Wilson told Claire Crick of All About Soap that after Aaron saw a male dance show in Perth, he made "a snap decision" to become an exotic dancer. Wilson said Aaron's career choice was similar to the characters featured in the 2012 film Magic Mike.

At the time of his arrival, Aaron was much closer to his younger brother Tyler as they both liked to live in the moment, whereas Mark was a bit more sensible and OCD. Wilson thought Aaron liked being the middle brother because he loves to be the centre of attention. The actor commented, "There's definitely no middle-child syndrome here! He's quick to mediate any arguments between the other two." Wilson also said Aaron was opportunistic like Tyler, but he understood limitations like Mark. McGregor opined Mark's younger siblings made him a stronger character, while Burns thought Aaron's arrival had changed the dynamic between Mark and Tyler.

Wilson described Aaron as "a very confident young guy", who loves life and is not easily fazed. He also likes to make others happy. The actor also told Daniel Kilkelly of Digital Spy: "Aaron's an infectious person. He's really happy, he's an optimist, he's got a lot of energy and there's a really good vibe which comes off him. He's received well by absolutely everyone." A writer for the official Neighbours website described the character as having "a big heart, and a cheeky streak". They also said Aaron's family was important to him and he would do anything for his siblings. Speaking to Hazel Bradley of The West Australian, Wilson admitted that he shared some similarities with his character, such as optimism and selflessness. However, Wilson thought Aaron was also naïve and occasionally vulnerable.

Aaron is openly gay, and Wilson told Peter Gray of Q News that he felt no pressure portraying a gay character, as there was a lot of support for Aaron. He called Aaron "a typical Aussie gay guy", which, he believed, was not well represented on Australian television at the time. Wilson turned to his own gay friends while researching Aaron's wardrobe. He thought the character was similar to them and based the clothing on items they wear. Wilson thought Aaron would be a good boyfriend because he was romantic, but his career put a strain on his past relationships. While his siblings have accepted Aaron's sexuality, their father struggled with it, but Aaron refused to let it get to him.

=== Introduction ===
"I knew this could not be a better way to enter a show. Some people arrive on Neighbours in a taxi on the Street, but Aaron comes in with an absolute bang so I was quite honoured to be playing him."

— Wilson on Aaron's unique entrance to the show. (2015)

Mark contacted Aaron after fearing that Tyler had "gone off the rails", following his arrest. Mark knew Aaron and Tyler had a close relationship and he needed Aaron's help. Both Mark and Tyler assumed Aaron still worked down the mines in Western Australia, but he had secretly switched careers to become an exotic dancer. At the same time Mark contacted Aaron, he was booked to appear at a charity bingo night hosted by Sheila Canning (Colette Mann) at The Waterhole. Aaron was set to perform his routine in the bar when bingo was called. Sheila encouraged Mark and Tyler to attend the event and they were "stunned" to see their brother half-naked on the stage.

Wilson explained that he had no dance experience coming into the show and took private lessons ahead of filming. He commented, "I hit the stage with 100 per cent confidence, so all of my efforts paid off!" Mark was unimpressed with his younger brother's new career choice and berated him for it, while Tyler was amused. He was further cheered up when Aaron helped him out at the garage. Mark made an effort to bond with his brothers, after seeing how close Aaron and Tyler were.

=== Relationship with Nate Kinski ===
As Aaron settled onto Ramsay Street, Tyler learned he was single and he decided to try and set Aaron up on a date with his friend Nate Kinski (Meyne Wyatt). Tyler's motive for the matchmaking scheme was his need to repair his broken friendship with Nate, who had not forgiven him for stealing a prescription pad from Karl Kennedy (Alan Fletcher). Aaron and Nate's first meeting did not go well, as they disagreed about everything and realised that they had nothing in common. Despite Tyler's efforts to get them to agree on something, Aaron and Nate realised what he was trying to do and told him that nothing was going to happen between them. Tyler's scheme did manage to get Nate to reconcile with him. Of the scenes, Wilson told Kilkelly: "Although Aaron is quite an infectious person and everyone receives him really well, for some unbeknown reason Nate just gives him the cold shoulder. Aaron doesn't really know how to handle that. The scene where Tyler tries to set us up is hilarious - it's an absolute car crash of a scene!"

Nate initially did not want anything to do with Aaron, but then Aaron got involved with his feud with Alistair Hall (Nick Cain) in an effort to help him out. Wilson said that Nate did not like Aaron's "game-playing". Sheila later charged a reluctant Nate with the task of getting Aaron to sign an employment contract for The Waterhole. Nate kept making snide comments about Aaron's career, so he refused to sign the contract. Sheila told Nate to make things right with Aaron, forcing him to beg. Aaron enjoyed seeing Nate's discomfort and agreed to sign the contract if he only dealt with Sheila. However, when Sheila suffered lock jaw, she forced Aaron and Nate to work together and they could resist taunting each other. Nate teased Aaron by telling him he found him to be attractive, while Aaron went to kiss him, only to pull away quickly. A TV Soap writer observed "it's beginning to look like there might be a mutual attraction behind Nate and Aaron's guarded exteriors."

Aaron and Nate were forced to spend more time together when Naomi Canning (Morgana O'Reilly) locked them in an outdoor hotel room with a glass front as part of a promotion for Lassiter's Hotel. The storyline started with Naomi hiring Aaron and a female model to pose as a happy couple. However, when the female model failed to turn up, Naomi grabbed Nate and locked him inside the room with Aaron. Nate decided to make the most of the situation and he hoped he could annoy Aaron in the process. Wyatt said, "after a while Nate doesn't even notice the audience and starts to lighten up, which surprises Aaron." Naomi's plan was a success, as Lassiter's received positive press about its support for same-sex relationships. She then asked the men to do something special for a photograph and Nate spontaneously kissed Aaron. Nate enjoyed the kiss and it became clear that he had strong feelings for Aaron. Wyatt thought the characters were "a good balance", but a future relationship depended on whether they could be themselves around each other.

When Aaron attempted to cheer up his friend Josh Willis (Harley Bonner) by acting as his wingman for the evening, he put himself in danger when her boyfriend Evan Shields (Daniel Fischer) appeared. Aaron tried to smooth things over, but he and Evan squared up to each other, leaving Josh to defuse the situation. As Aaron walked home, Evan appeared and threw a drink in his face, before attacking him. Wilson said it was a "pretty bad" moment, but Nate came to Aaron's rescue and dragged Evan away, before scaring him off. Aaron did not have a chance to thank Nate, as he left the scene. Neither Aaron and Nate were willing to accept that they had romantic feelings for each other. Nate believed Aaron was not interested in him, so when Aaron offered to be his slave for the week to make up for injuring him during Tai Chi, Nate was unaware Aaron was trying to flirt with him. Nate later confronted Aaron, who confessed to having feelings for him. But Nate thought Aaron was joking and Aaron was "crushed" by his rejection. Tyler then told Nate that his brother was attracted to him.

Aaron and Nate eventually developed a relationship. After Nate got involved in a fight, he decided to leave town to clear his head. Aaron was "angry and upset" when he learnt that Nate had returned to Australia and had not been in contact with him. Wilson said Aaron and Nate had "a lot of stuff to sort out", while adding that the characters wanted to be together, but were unsure if they could make it work. He continued, "Ever since they first met they've always argued about the small suff and they're still doing it now." Wilson later commented that as much as they loved each other, they could not live with each other because they were opposites. He also said that the couple complemented one another well, as "Nate is really closed off, whereas Aaron is a lot more free and happy." When Nate eventually returned, he struggled to reconnect with Aaron and was "gutted" to learn that Aaron had moved on with someone else while he was away. Wilson added that Aaron resists a reconciliation as he has been hurt.

=== Career changes and Tom Quill ===
After giving up exotic dancing, Aaron briefly sold coffee and then worked as a bodyguard for "resident baddie" Paul Robinson (Stefan Dennis). However, Aaron struggled to cope with Paul's various schemes. In March 2016, Wilson teased a new darker storyline for Aaron, saying "I can't talk about it yet but anything where you have to go to the dark places in your mind is really challenging." Aaron was later hired to be new mayor Sonya Rebecchi's (Eve Morey) executive assistant, and Wilson joked "I get to wear a lot of suits from here on in, which is better than wearing next to nothing, which is how I first came on the show." Aaron also attracted the attentions of Tom Quill (Kane Felsinger), the development manager for Lassiter's Hotel. Aaron accepted some champagne from Tom, before realising that it could be seen as conflict of interest as Tom wanted to know Sonya's position on the proposed expansion of Lassiter's. Aaron later returned the gift to Tom, who made an advance on Aaron. As he was hurting over Nate's silence, Aaron agreed to go on a date with Tom. Following the success of the first date, Aaron and Tom went on another and Tom learnt that approval for the Lassiter's expansion could take months. He persuaded Aaron to give him a list of everyone opposed to the expansion and when Aaron discovered they had withdrawn their opposition, he knew he had "crossed the ethical line".

Tom then used Aaron's laptop to doctor an environmental impact report, leading the council to approve the development. Aaron then realised Tom had taken advantage of him and told Sonya, who fired him. Shortly after, an explosion at the Lassiter's Hotel dominated the show's storylines and Aaron was shown to have "a guilty conscience" over something. Aaron was later "anxious" to know if Tom was okay, as he had not been since that day. After hearing that Tom's ID had been found in the wreckage, Aaron feared that he was dead and tried to push Nate away. But when Nate pressed him, Aaron admitted that if Tom was dead, then it was down to him. In an interview with Carena Crawford of All About Soap, Wilson detailed the events in the lead up to the explosion, saying "Aaron knew Tom was dodgy and went on a hunt to find out exactly what was going on. The last time Aaron saw Tom they had a bit of an altercation and got into a fight in the hotel boiler room." Wilson went on to explain that Aaron hit Tom and then walked away, leaving Tom in a semi-conscious state. When the boiler room exploded shortly afterwards, Aaron believed that Tom had been killed.

In what was billed as "a tense storyline", Aaron began receiving threatening text message from an unknown sender who knew what he did to Tom. Aaron initially tried to keep the messages to himself, but he was "freaking out" as he could be charged with manslaughter or murder if his secret came out. Nate believed Tom's mother Julie Quill (Gail Easdale) might be behind the messages, as she had been asking Aaron a lot of questions about the day of the explosion and his relationship with Tom. However, once Nate discovered it was not Julie, Aaron thought that it would be best if he went to the police. Wilson told Carena Crawford of All About Soap, "Aaron's finding it hard to walk around Erinsborough thinking that he's killed someone." The person behind the messages soon demanded $10,000 from Aaron, giving Nate a chance to set up a trap. He hid some money in an envelope at an old well and when they mystery person picked it up, they caught him. The person behind the messages turned out to be Tom, and Wilson said Aaron experienced "really mixed emotions" when he saw him. Aaron really believed he had killed someone and was facing time in prison and when he realised that was not going to happen, he wanted to stop Tom. Aaron then declared that he was going to tell Mark, but Nate warned him that he could still face charges for punching Tom.

=== David Tanaka ===
"I think they're perfect because they're not the same person, they're the complete opposite. Aaron is everything David wants to be and David is everything Aaron wants to be. So they kind of look up to each other in a way, which is really cute."

— Wilson on Aaron and David.

In 2016, producers introduced the Tanaka twins David (Takaya Honda) and Leo (Tim Kano), who move to Erinsborough. Aaron is initially attracted to Leo, while his friend Amy Williams (Zoe Cramond) likes David. Aaron organises a night out at the Back Lane Bar in the city for the group, where Aaron realises that Leo is straight and interested in Amy. Aaron leaves the bar early, but he later sets up Amy and David on a date. However, he shares an "intense moment" with David, leading him to believe that David is gay. He goes to warn Amy, but is too late and she goes on her date with David. Aaron later confronts David, who insists that he is not gay and that he likes Amy. Aaron later helps organises a day out for David's great-grandmother Kazuko Sano (Linda Chin) and they bond. Aaron also urges David to question Kazuko about his biological father, but David is hurt by Kazuko's angry reaction. Aaron tries to apologise to David, but David thinks he is making romantic advances towards him and insults Aaron's homosexuality. He later apologises and they share another moment.

After realising that he should embrace his sexuality, David goes to Number 24 late at night to see Aaron and potentially confess his feelings for him. But in a storyline twist, Aaron admits that he is not alone and actually has another man in his room, causing David to leave quickly. David comes out and realises he has feelings for Aaron. They spend ANZAC Day together, but when David tries to kiss Aaron, he is rejected. Wilson said that Aaron is not expecting the kiss, as he was thinking about Nate at the time. David feels embarrassed and runs off, which Wilson thought was true to the character. He explained, "They are pretty much opposites – Aaron will always stand and fight, whereas David always chooses flight." In an interview on Tenplay, Wilson explains that while Aaron does have feelings for David, he knows that David needs to deal with his sexuality and have some fun first. Aaron hopes that David will return to him eventually. Wilson liked the pairing of Aaron and David, calling them "a great couple", and he thought they could get married in the future.

Wilson admitted that he and Honda wanted the writers to hurry up and get the couple together, but knew they were having "some fun" and building the relationship up first. A few months later, Aaron and David begin a relationship. Wilson said it was getting increasingly harder for Aaron to be without David, as he explores his sexuality, as Aaron was in love with him. Wilson also pointed out that it was obvious to everyone else that the pair should be a couple. David's brother Leo "becomes sick of the guys misreading each other’s signals" and forces Aaron to tell David about his feelings for him during a karaoke event at The Waterhole. Wilson said the couple's relationship would have "great potential" for future storylines. He did not think they would be boring if they got together, and pointed out that there was mileage in their opposite personality traits, saying "David is quite the introvert, so he wouldn't like Aaron dancing and hanging out in nightclubs. Whereas Aaron wouldn't want to just sit at home with David every night."

=== Family introductions ===
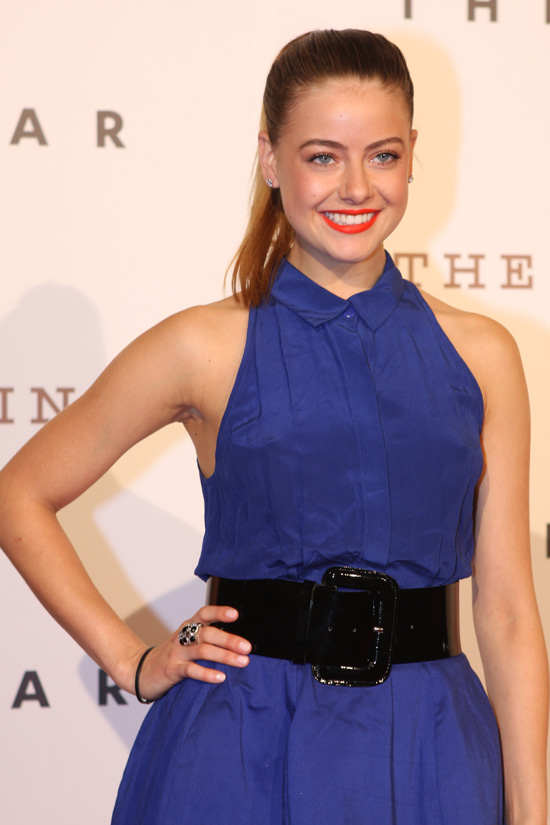
April Rose Pengilly was introduced as Aaron's younger sister Chloe in March 2018.

A month after Aaron's arrival, the Brennan brothers' father Russell Brennan (Russell Kiefel) was introduced and the family became the focus of a "controversial" domestic violence storyline. Russell abused his sons as they were growing up and the brothers later became estranged from him. Russell wants to prove that he is a changed man. While Mark is pleased to see his father, Tyler tries to avoid him, and Aaron thinks about Russell's negative reaction upon learning he had a gay son. Russell makes plans to buy the local garage with his sons, but Tyler is still unhappy to be reunited with him. When Tyler punches Russell, he eventually tells Aaron and Mark about the abuse he had suffered at the hands of their father. Mark is initially sceptical, until he talks with Aaron and they confront Russell, who does not deny the accusations. Aaron and Mark support their younger brother and ask Russell to leave town.

Producers planned to bring Russell back, but the storyline had to be rewritten due to Kiefel's unexpected death. In 2017, it was announced the Brennan brothers' mother Fay Brennan (Zoe Bertram) would be introduced instead. Wilson said that the brothers have various issues with their mother and Aaron acts "very out of character" towards her. Wilson enjoyed exploring the family dynamic further, as well as playing Aaron's unpredictable reaction to her arrival. He also said some viewers would be able to relate to the issues that Aaron and his mother have. Aaron later admits to his partner, David, that he resents Fay for leaving the family, as he was just thirteen years old and trying to deal with his sexuality. David encourages Aaron to resolve his issues with his mother, and Wilson stated that Aaron and Fay would "go through the whole process of resolving that".

The following year, Aaron, Mark and Tyler's younger sister Chloe Brennan (April Rose Pengilly) was introduced. Chloe's backstory states that when Russell and Fay's marriage ended, she went to live with her mother, while the brothers stayed with Russell. The siblings only saw each other during the holidays and at Christmas. Chloe comes to Erinsborough in an attempt to reconnect with Aaron and Mark. In November 2018, Chloe reveals to her brothers that she has Huntington's disease, after learning that Aaron and David want to have a baby using Aaron's sperm. Chloe initially tries to persuade them to let David be the donor, but eventually tells Mark and Aaron that she has the Huntington's gene, and they could have it too. Mark decides to get tested right away, but Aaron decides not to, as he would rather not know.

=== Other storylines ===
When Josh learns Aaron is looking for someone else to join his dance act, he auditions for the place, as he needs to raise money for an operation for his sick daughter. Aaron and Josh then form an exotic dance duo called The Heat. Josh is "terrified" when The Heat receive their first booking, a 50th birthday party at the community centre. Aaron and Josh put together a routine on the day and while the performance starts off "a bit rough", the female audience enjoy it. Aaron also enjoys the attention, while Josh receives an indecent proposal from a member of the audience. Bonner said that he and Wilson had dance lessons at the Ministry of Dance for the scenes.

Needing another job, Aaron decides to reinvent himself as a social media manager in mid-2016. He befriends his neighbour Xanthe Canning (Lilly Van der Meer) upon learning that she is being bullied online by trolls. When Aaron realises that Xanthe is trying to lose weight and change her appearance, he becomes her mentor and tells her to ignore the trolls. Aaron then launches his own brand management company and Nate helps fund it. Just as Aaron starts to feel disheartened, Paul Robinson asks Aaron to help him clear his name after he is charged with causing the Lassiter's explosion. Paul explains that he just wants to change public opinion of him and Aaron agrees to help. He comes up with a strategy to use social media, as traditional media sources will not touch the story. Aaron convinces Piper Willis (Mavournee Hazel) to interview Paul for her vlog.

In 2017, Aaron explores another new career when he teams up with Mishti Sharma (Scarlet Vas) to purchase and run a gym. Aaron and Mishti bond over their respective interests in fitness, and when they learn that a local gym, The Shed, is for sale, they decide to purchase it together. The pair are "left disappointed" when the gym is sold to someone else, however, when that sale falls through, Mishti puts in an offer, which is accepted. When Mishti goes to tell Aaron what she has done, she learns that he does not want to buy the business anymore. But Aaron changes his mind when Sonya gives him a "confidence boost" by pointing out how his friendly persona and love of fitness would make him a great gym owner. Of Mishti's bond with Aaron, Vas commented, "I think her friendship with Aaron is really cute. They're different, but fitness brings them together. Plus it's so much fun working with Matt Wilson [Aaron]. He's the kindest person." Wilson thought the career change was a "pivotal moment" for his character, and he was happy that he did not have to do any more dancing scenes. He also liked working on the new set and thought Aaron being a personal trainer was a good fit.

=== Finale and return ===
Following Neighbours' cancellation in March 2023, a happy ending was planned for the characters of Aaron and David. This required the redevelopment of a storyline that was originally planned to end with David's departure, following Honda's decision to leave his role. Aaron was not among the characters announced to be returning to Neighbours upon its return to production in 2023. However, in September 2023 Wilson appeared in the background of a 10 News First behind the scenes feature on the show's imminent return, with Aaron's apparent return subsequently reported on in the press. Aaron and David made a permanent return on 13 November 2023, though David was killed three months later.

Following David's tragic death, Aaron is left shocked and disbelieved as he cannot imagine life without his 'boo'. Aaron navigates his grief by binge drinking, much to the disappointment of Nicolette as Aaron neglects their daughter, Isla. After seeing the Drinks Divas vehicle vandalised with David being defaced, Aaron confronts Slade and tackles him to the ground intending to attack him, but is quickly stopped by Andrew. Aaron is warned by Andrew that the last thing he would want is to be charged for assault on top of his grief, and that if he is not careful he could potentially hurt others. A few days later, a tired, frustrated Nicolette then releases her anger on Aaron for failing to take care of Isla as the family mourns David's death, causing Aaron to run away. Aaron and Krista then bond as the pair deals with their personal grief, as Krista lost her baby due to the Lassiter's sauna incident. The pair go on a holiday and take drugs, which Nicolette discovers, causing her to ban Aaron from seeing Isla until he can control his addictions and behaviour.

As Aaron's behaviour improves, and is seen to be more happier, a friend of Melanie's named Logan Shembri (Matthew Backer) arrives in Erinsborough. Aaron and Logan become friends and hang out over coffee and by going running. However, Logan steals Aaron's earphones and returns them as an excuse to visit his home. Logan looks at a photograph of David and Aaron when he is alone and behaves suspiciously. Logan then asks Aaron for a cocktail making lesson that he happily accepts, but it was short-lived when Logan unintentionally does a particular action that gives Aaron traumatic flashbacks of David, as the couple would romantically make cocktails together. Aaron had a sudden outburst and demanded that Logan leave immediately, but shortly after apologised for his blowup. Unaware of Logan's obsession with David prior to his move to Erinsborough, Aaron is grateful for Logan's support and fondness.

Andrew unharmfully asks Aaron how he feels about Logan, but he implies that they are only just friends. Toadie tells Aaron that there is nothing wrong with making new friends, and having company as he grieves for his widow. Aaron donates David's old clothing to the Sonya Rebecchi Foundation, which he later regrets and requests to Toadie if he can have them back. However, Logan appeared to have purchased all of the clothing before he could retrieve it, much to the suspicion of Melanie.

=== Relationship with Rhett Norman and departure ===
In 2025, Aaron embarks on a new relationship with Rhett Norman (Liam Maguire). On 4 August, it was announced Aaron would leave the series with Rhett in scenes airing on 1 September. Due to Wilson's presence on-set during the series' final week of production, Aaron is speculated to make a further appearance in December.

== Reception ==
"I have been waiting for people to be mean but they just haven't. It could be something to do with the character. Aaron is not a bad guy at all, he is very generous and considerate of others. I have hit the jackpot with this guy."

— Wilson's on how well Aaron has been received by viewers. (2016)

For his portrayal of Aaron, Wilson received a nomination for Best Daytime Star at the 2018 Inside Soap Awards. Wilson was longlisted for the same award in 2024. Aaron and David's partnership was nominated for Best Soap Couple at the 2018 Digital Spy Reader Awards; they came in seventh place with 5.3% of the total votes.

Shannon Molloy of news.com.au observed that Aaron made a "colourful and abrupt entrance". While an Inside Soap writer stated "Let's just say that the hunky new Brennan brother, Aaron, makes quite an entrance..." Another contributor to the publication wrote that the character "made quite the impression". Anthony D. Langford from TheBacklot.com admitted to being surprised that the producers had made one of the Brennan brothers gay. He also questioned whether Aaron's love life would be "as messy and complicated as his brothers' tend to be" and hoped Wilson had been cast for more than his body and appearance.

Claire Crick from All About Soap was pleased to meet the latest Brennan brother, commenting "We've been waiting for weeks in the All About Soap office, and as of today Aaron Brennan is finally on our screens. Hurrah! And he certainly arrived with a bang, didn't he?" Crick went on to say that Aaron was a mix of his two brothers' personalities and a good dancer. She also branded him "lovely Aaron". Digital Spy's Daniel Kilkelly dubbed the character "Erinsborough's nice guy". While Will Stroude of Attitude labelled him "Ramsay Street's ravishing new resident" and "Mark and Tyler's mischievous middle brother". Aaron's arrival was named one of "the best bits of July" by a writer for the Inside Soap Yearbook 2016.

Langford, now writing for TVSource Magazine, said that he was not a fan of Aaron's relationship with Nate. He found the pairing to be lacking in chemistry and "terribly boring". He added "I just don't believe a guy like Aaron would date a total downer like Nate." A Soap World columnist named Aaron the Best New Male Character during their feature on the highs and lows of soap operas in 2015. The columnist wrote, "As we got to know Aaron, there was even more to like as he made his mark with his cheeky and playful personality. In a refreshing change, the very masculine looking Aaron turned out to be gay, proving that you can't always judge a book by its cover."

Ben Fenlon of the Daily Express thought that Aaron stripping for an investor, while accompanied by a solar powered lawnmower, was "one of most bizarre moments in Neighbours' history, maybe even in soap." In 2019, Digital Spy's Conor McMullan included Aaron's various career changes in his feature about repetitive Neighbours storylines. He wrote, "Not everyone can walk into the perfect job the first time around. Or indeed, second or third. For Aaron Brennan, it took five or six attempts. Since his arrival in 2015, Aaron has racked up an impressive number of careers – most quickly discarded as quickly as he started them." McMullan said Aaron's job as personal trainer and gym owner was "the best and most believable route" for him, so everything worked out eventually. In 2022, Sam Strutt of The Guardian listed Aaron and David's wedding as the eighth most memorable moment from the entire history of Neighbours. Strutt also branded it the show's most memorable wedding since the ceremony of Scott Robinson and Charlene Mitchell.
