= David Tanaka =

Fictional character from the Australian soap opera Neighbours

- Neighbours character
- Portrayed by: Takaya Honda
- Duration: 2016–2024
- First appearance: 21 September 2016
- Last appearance: 1 February 2024; 1 April 2024 (voice)
- Introduced by: Jason Herbison
- Spin-off appearances: Road Trip (2016); Neighbours vs Time Travel (2017)
In-universe information
- Occupation: Doctor
- Family: Robinson
- Father: Paul Robinson
- Mother: Kim Tanaka
- Brothers: Leo Tanaka
- Half-brothers: Robert Robinson; Cameron Robinson; Andrew Robinson
- Half-sisters: Amy Williams; Elle Robinson
- Husband: Aaron Brennan (2018–2024)
- Daughters: Isla Tanaka-Brennan
- Uncles: Glen Donnelly
- Aunts: Lucy Robinson
- Nephews: Jimmy Williams
- Nieces: Harlow Robinson; Abigail Tanaka
- First cousins: Kiri Durant; Annie Robinson-Pappas
- Other relatives: Kazuko Sano; Hilary Robinson

David Tanaka is a fictional character from the Australian soap opera Neighbours, played by Takaya Honda. He made his first appearance in the main show during the episode broadcast on 21 September 2016. The character was introduced alongside his twin brother Leo Tanaka (Tim Kano), and they arrive in Erinsborough to find their long-lost biological father. The show's producer had planned their stories out six months in advance and was excited about the prospect of them joining the series. Both Honda and Kano auditioned for both roles and were later awarded their respective parts. David is characterised as the more self-conscious and socially awkward of the Tanaka twins, but he is career minded and confident in his role as a doctor.

Writers developed an issue-led storyline for David which saw him struggling to come to terms with his sexuality. Having been pressured by his great-grandmother Kazuko Sano (Linda Chin) to settle down with a woman, David finds it difficult to deal with his attraction to the openly gay character Aaron Brennan (Matt Wilson). The mystery of David and Leo's paternity served as the character's most prominent story during their first year in the show. Long established character Paul Robinson (Stefan Dennis) was later revealed to be their father, linking the characters to one of the show's original families. After he comes out to his family and friends, David and Aaron's partnership proved popular with viewers and they became the subjects of the first same sex marriage on Australian television in 2018. Later, the couple were used to explore the foster care and adoption systems in Australia. Honda chose to leave the role in 2021, though the cancellation and subsequent revival of Neighbours saw David remain in the series until his death on 1 February 2024, followed by voice cameos on 28 March and 1 April of the same year.

== Casting ==
The character and Honda's casting was announced on 22 August 2016, along with Tim Kano who plays David's twin brother Leo Tanaka. Of his casting, Honda said, "I feel so privileged to have the opportunity to join the regular cast of Neighbours. To learn from such prominent and longstanding Australian talent is truly seeing my dreams fulfilled." David and Leo come to Erinsborough in the hope of solving "a family mystery". David is a doctor, who has "a social conscience".

The show held a lengthy casting process for the characters because they wanted to find similar looking actors. Honda described it as a "strange" process with numerous call backs. He and Kano auditioned for both David and Leo to discover who was better suited to each role. Kano's first audition required him to switch from playing either character in a matter of seconds. Honda added that it was "tough" audition because the characters are completely different.

== Development ==
=== Webisodes and introduction ===
Neighbours' executive producer Jason Herbison had planned the duo's storyline six months in advance. He was "delighted" to hire Honda and Kano and described watching them play the characters he had envisioned a "very thrilling" experience. Ahead of his first appearance in the main show, the character was featured in a series of webisodes titled Road Trip. The series focuses on the brothers' road trip on the way to Erinsborough, where they were joined by Leo's love interest Milly (Eliza Charley). The webisodes were designed to give viewers a chance to watch the "brotherly dynamic" the Tanaka twins share. In addition they could witness the different personalities the two characters have. David and Leo made their first screen appearance in the main show during the episode broadcast on 21 September 2016. They arrive to look after their great-grandmother Kazuko Sano (Linda Chin), who has been admitted to the local hospital. Kano revealed that the twins had another motive for being in the area as they were searching for lost relative. When David and Leo spend more time in Erinsborough they befriend Aaron Brennan (Matt Wilson), Amy Williams (Zoe Cramond) and Elly Conway (Jodi Anasta), setting the characters up to become intertwined in one another's storylines.

=== Characterisation ===
"Good looking, highly intelligent and kind - David is a catch. Not that he seems aware of the attention he attracts. Losing himself in his work, David avoids intimacy. But the question of who he really is – what he really wants - will be tested when he forms some unlikely friendships in Erinsborough."

— An excerpt taken from David's character biography hosted by Tenplay.

David is characterised as kind and intelligent doctor who was born in Parramatta to an ambitious mother. Her influence taught David the importance of excelling in his medical career. His backstory details his teenage years spent focusing on studying instead of socialising. This meant the character had missed out on "normal teenage rites of passage" which resulted in him being socially awkward and self-conscious. Honda told a reporter from Tenplay that David had preferred to concentrate on his career rather than pursue romance. David been unable to understand how relationships work and coming to Erinsborough begins to change that. Playing a medic on the show requires Honda to research specific medical scenarios for hospital scenes. The production team also hired a medical adviser on-set to ensure factual accuracy. The actor told All About Soap's Claire Crick that his character was born to be a doctor. Despite it lacking in social scenarios, David's confidence excels in his work because it is a job he loves. Honda assessed that "when it comes to medicine David knows where he is and that he's good at it."

Despite being twins, David and Leo have different personalities. David is "more serious and conscientious" planning out his career path, in comparison to his impulsive entrepreneurial brother Leo. Honda believes that the two characters do share similarities ranging from a strong work ethic and sense of discipline. However, he noted that their methods of achieving their goals are completely different. They also have conflicting morals, but both believe they do things for the right reasons. Honda has described the pair as having an unspoken and "innate brotherly twin" connection which is apparent on-screen. The actor said: "it's underlying every line of dialogue and I think that Tim and I are pulling that off." Honda and Kano had natural chemistry off-set which helped them to play twins. They are both half Japanese with Caucasian mothers, which they thought was a "crazy" coincidence that helped them bond.

=== Paternity mystery ===
David's main story following his introduction to the show was his desire to find his biological father. David's initial findings lead him to a homeless man named Bradley Satchwell (Alfred Nicdao). He had been banned from visiting their mother in hospital when she gave birth. Various scenes are played out to suggest Bradley is their father. However, the character is reluctant to reveal details, and runs away. Months later Leo finds Bradley and bribes him with money to spend time with David. Bradley goes for a medical check up and is again reluctant to talk about his past. Writers introduced a "new twist" into their mystery story by ruling out Bradley as the twins father. David runs a blood test which reveals Bradley cannot be related to them.

Writers developed the story further with the introduction of Jasmine Udagawa (Kaori Maeda-Judge), an investor in the local hotel Lassiters. She has a vendetta against Leo and keeps a secret file titled "Tanaka". Amy over hears Jasmine telling Terese Willis (Rebekah Elmaloglou) that Leo could potentially inherit Lassiters and she informs him about the news. This leads Leo to believe he is related to the Udagawa family, who are also Japanese. Jasmine offers the Tanakas $10,000 to leave Erinsborough. He refuses, and it leads Leo to suspect that Jasmine's uncle Hiro Udagawa is their father. Amy joins Leo in his search to track down Hiro to his last known address. However, their search is shortened when they discover that Hiro died the previous year.

The show introduced a further red herring by releasing information suggesting that historic character Scott Robinson was the father of the twins. Producers rehired actress Jenny Young to reprise her role as Kim Taylor (now Tanaka) after a 31 year absence. She is revealed to be David and Leo's mother, having been pregnant during her last appearance in 1985. Kim had been romantically involved with Scott, suggesting him as a possible father. The 2017 storyline develops as David discovers Kim's connection to Scott, and confronts his mother. Kim denies Scott is the twins' father, but is shocked to learn Leo has taken Amy away for a romantic weekend. She rushes to prevent the pair from sleeping together. This makes David think his theory is correct because Kim would not want Amy, who is Scott's relative, to sleep with Leo. This episode brought about the culmination of the mystery storyline as the Tanaka's biological father was revealed. In one final "twist" in the storyline, Scott's brother Paul Robinson (Stefan Dennis) was revealed to be their father. This meant that Amy is David and Leo's half-sister, which shocks the latter having fallen in love with her. The actors knew about the outcome of the story when it began but were forced to be secretive. Kano told Sarah Ellis from Inside Soap that Kim was not certain Paul was their father but knew he could be. He added that could not wait for the audience's reaction to the shock revelation.

Honda later explained that his character was nervous about forming a relationship with Paul because he is a "conservative businessman". However, unlike Leo, he accepts the news that Paul is their father. He also researched the Robinson family's history within the show to provide realism. Honda added "There has been a lot of thought in terms of history and trying to stay true to everything. We wanted to make sure that it didn't come across as just a random thing that was thrown together. We thought a lot about it."

=== Sexuality ===
David has been portrayed as struggling to come to terms with his sexuality. When he arrives in Erinsborough it becomes apparent that he is attracted to men but David ignores these feelings. Honda said that David struggles and feels pressured by those around him to make a decision. He decides to focus on work until he can make sense of his feelings. The actor explained that "he doesn't quite understand who he is or what he is attracted to. He thinks he's meant to fancy girls, but it's never really worked out with them in the past."

Honda felt pressured portraying a sensitive subject that real people experience. He wanted to make David's story "respectful and understanding" for the show's audience. On-screen, Kazuko pesters David to find himself a girlfriend to settle down with. Honda said that because of Kazuko's interference David presumes he may have not met a compatible female and even questions if there is something "wrong" with himself. When David spends time with Amy, the pair share a kiss, but David knows he is not attracted to her. The actor told Rachael Gavin from TV Soap that Amy is "an almost perfect person" for David but there is no "chemistry" between them when they kiss. He then begins to spend more time with Aaron and there is an attraction between them. Assessing David's situation Honda explained that "It tortures him because he can't understand it. He's always tried to intellectualise it and once stuff develops with Aaron he comes to more of an understanding of what is going on and then he start to break down some of the barriers." Aaron believes that David is gay following an intense moment the pair share. He warns Amy of his suspicions and confronts David, who then denies it, claiming to be heterosexual.

Aaron organises a day out for Kazuko and he urges David to question her about his father. She does not react well and David blames Aaron. He apologises to David, who thinks Aaron is trying to seduce him. He insults Aaron in a homophobic manner. David later apologises for his behaviour which leads to their "most intense" and "charged" moment together, but David stops himself from kissing Aaron and runs away. The storyline reached a turning point as David decides to confide his fears about being gay to the local priest, Father Jack Callahan (Andrew James Morley). However, writers were quick to add more turmoil to David's sexuality struggle. His great-grandmother's health begins to deteriorate in hospital. David visits Kazuko and she orders him to not pursue his homosexual feelings any further. She then dies, which leaves David feeling as though he has to adhere to her dying wish.

David receives encouragement from Paige to accept his feelings for men. David then realises he should be honest about both his sexuality and the baby. A promotional trailer released by Neighbours teased David paying a late night visit to Aaron's home to confess his feelings. However, in a twist, as the scenes aired, Aaron reveals he has just slept with another man, forcing David to hide his feelings once again. When David comes out to his family and friends he tries to kiss Aaron. Wilson told Tenplay that David acts on impulse and wants to explore his sexuality after being honest about it. He explained that Aaron wants David to have fun with other men to fully understand his sexuality. Although David interprets Aaron's advice as a rejection, Honda believed that David was not ready to be with anyone.

As a heterosexual, Honda found some challenges in playing a gay man, but did not find it difficult to portray love for his on-screen partners. He stated that "to me, love is love. And playing a character, whether I’m having to love a man, woman or other, is giving a representation of that love." He viewed the issues that David had negotiated as learning experiences for him, believing that "being exposed to those storylines in an intimate way raises those issues in my mind strongly".

=== Relationship with Aaron Brennan ===
David and Aaron later begin a relationship; viewer reaction had been positive, with many hoping they would get together, even earning them the portmanteau "Daaron". Honda compared the pairing to a traditional soap opera on/off relationship. He noted that "everything that's happened with Aaron and David has been justified and there is a reality to it, which I quite like." Wilson branded their relationship as an "emotional rollercoaster", adding that they get along well with much chemistry but can suddenly become estranged because of a miscommunication. Aaron had spent many episodes pondering whether or not to be with David. Wilson believed his character was wary of David having only recently been accepting of his own sexuality. He thought it best to let David explore and not trap him in a relationship. Ultimately, Aaron found his love for David to difficult to ignore. Wilson described the character's personalities stating that "David's everything Aaron wants to be – a smart, successful, really nice guy with no enemies. Meanwhile, Aaron is everything David would like to be – open, free-spirited and enthusiastic about everything. They're very different, but opposites attract."

Writers later devised another break up for the characters. They began by planning a "disastrous proposal" of marriage, which has David asking Aaron to be his husband. Shocked by his proposal, Aaron rejects him. The storyline coincided with the legalisation of same-sex marriage in Australia. Neighbours' executive producer Jason Herbison was delighted with the change, though he believed that the characters should be like all soap couples and face challenges before marrying. This was followed by the introduction of Aaron's ex-boyfriend Rory Zemiro (Ash Williams), who comes between them. Aaron met up with Rory in Paris, but never told David. Rory tells David about his encounter with Aaron, but fails to mention Aaron remained faithful. David ends his relationship with Aaron, who reacts by seeking solace in Rory. The break-up shocked fans and some even yelled at Honda over it. The actor added that the fans believed David had done wrong and should forgive Aaron.

David and Aaron get back together following his relationship with Rafael. Honda told Sasha Morris from the Daily Star that "the audience like to see a couple fight for their romance and fight to be with each other, and David definitely needs to grow from what has happened in the past." He also hoped that David and Aaron would be more intimate on-screen. Honda told Katie Baillie from Metro that Aaron wanted David back the entire time they were apart. David feels more confident to take charge of their relationship, which the actor thought was "a nice full circle" for the story.

Their relationship is soon strengthened by a proposal of marriage, to which they both agree. Producers planned the wedding storyline following the legalisation of same-sex marriage in Australia which occurred in December 2017, following a public referendum. They then hired LGBTQ+ rights activist Magda Szubanski to play a marriage celebrant to officiate their wedding. To celebrate the event, promotional photographs were released of the actors holding a Ramsay Street sign decorated in the colours of the pride flag. They also revealed that the wedding would air in September 2018. Neighbours executive producer Jason Herbison revealed that his team had been working on the storyline during the referendum. They worried that the story about "love and equality" may not have been legal when it needed to air. He added that he was delighted when it was legalised because viewers would witness an "iconic moment come to life on screen". Wilson said that many people he knew believed that Australia's previous stance on gay marriage was outdated. He expressed his delight that David and Aaron would become the first gay couple to legally marry on Australian television. Honda branded it a "historic moment in Australian television."

Neighbours script producer Shane Isheev used his own experiences and relationships to inform David and Aaron's story, and wished for the couple to be "the next Karl and Susan". Upon David's death in 2024, Isheev stated he was "devastated" that their relationship had come to an end.

=== Relationship with Rafael Humphreys ===
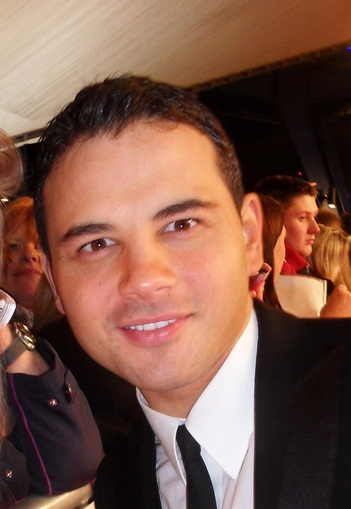
Ryan Thomas plays David's love interest Rafael Humphreys

When David and Aaron ended their relationship for a brief period in early 2018, writers created a new romance between David and Rafael Humphreys (Ryan Thomas). Rafael is introduced into the series as a "troubled" and "secretive" character. In addition, he also has a vendetta against David's father Paul. His romance with David is unexpected and not part of his plans. Thomas told Baillie from Metro that Rafael's feelings for David "caught him off guard", and the emotions he feels cause him added stress.

When the pair decide to become intimate, David discovers that Rafael has substantial scarring on his back. Rafael feels insecure, and thinks David will not be attracted to him once he sees his scars; however, David reacts positively, in a caring manner, and the two have sex. Honda told Daniel Kilkelly from Digital Spy that his character dealt with the situation well. He explained that "I think the scene is a true exposé for both characters. David is so happy because he feels that Rafael has finally opened up to him." Writers created the scene, but the director of the episode allowed Honda and Thomas to change the scene; they wanted to make it as "powerful as possible". Neighbours is a G-rated programme, but the scene was more intense and intimate than previous depictions of same-sex intimacy. It received praise from viewers, and was acknowledged by various media outlets, including Gay Times and the Evening Standard.

Rafael begins to scheme with Sue Parker (Kate Gorman) to destroy Paul's life. When David introduces Rafael to Aaron, the latter becomes suspicious and suspects his involvement with David is not genuine. Aaron sneaks into Rafael's room and finds evidence of his association with Sue. Aaron clashes with Rafael, and rips his shirt off, publicly exposing his scars. Rafael admits to sabotaging Paul's business and causing the accident which harmed Leo. He reveals that he believes Paul was directly involved in a fire which killed his mother while she was working inside Paul's factory. However, Paul is forgiving, and decides to help Rafael get answers about his mother's death.

Paul manages to prove his innocence, and they learn Dakota Davies (Sheree Murphy) was involved. As Rafael was only a guest character, his departure story was created around the discovery about Dakota. David wants to resume his relationship with Rafael, deciding that he can forgive his deceit. However, Rafael decides to go to the United Kingdom in search of Dakota, and breaks-up with David. Honda decided that David and Rafael's relationship was completely different to the one he shared with Aaron. He believed that David had "more passion" and "lustful" scenes with Rafael, adding "those scenes were powerful because they were intimate."

=== Foster care ===
In April 2020, it was announced that David and Aaron would explore adoption and foster care in a new storyline, which saw Ezra Justin join Neighbours as teenage boy Emmett Donaldson. This followed the earlier announcement that Deborra-Lee Furness, who previously appeared in Neighbours as Linda Hartley, would direct episodes that saw a couple become permanent carers to a displaced child. Furness is the founder of the Australian charity Adopt Change, as well as having adopted her two children with Hugh Jackman. Furness stated that she was "thrilled to be collaborating with the team at Neighbours to direct these episodes and tell a story that is not often represented in mainstream media", hoping that the awareness raised would encourage "a positive shift in both culture and policy towards permanent solutions" to Australian out-of-home care. Writing on Instagram, Honda noted that "Deb really pushed us to draw every moment out of the script and establish this story with a solid foundation".

As the storyline began, David and Aaron faced intrusive questions while being assessed to become foster parents, and are surprised to be contacted as emergency carers for 13-year-old Emmett, having requested to foster a child between the ages of two and five. Emmett's initial week-long stay with the couple is turbulent, when he disappears upon learning they wanted a younger child. Honda explained that the couple's insecurities at their interview stemmed from the perception that they were being asked questions a heterosexual couple would not be. He also believed that their reluctance to take care of an older child was through lack of confidence in their abilities, rather than a lack of desire. Wilson explained that David was more understanding of the line of questioning the couple faced than Aaron, who reacted with anger. The dynamics in the household were further complicated by the arrival of Emmett's older brother, Brent Colefax (Texas Watterston).

The production also worked with Stacy Blythe, a Western Sydney University academic in the fields of developmental trauma and out-of-home care, on the storyline. Blythe stated that "the Neighbours team were very receptive to my feedback, and worked to ensure that the experiences and behaviours of Emmett, David and Aaron provided an accurate representation of out of home care in Australia". She also highlighted the misbehaviours displayed by Emmett, and David and Aaron's responses, as aspects of the story that were crafted with the intention of displaying both the challenges of foster care and the possibilities for progress: "It’s important to understand that Emmett’s reactions are not intentional moments of delinquency – his behaviours are symptoms of previous trauma that he has experienced. And the only chance that Emmett has for a positive outcome, is if his trauma is recognised, and he receives understanding, love and support." Honda stated that "a lot of foster kids who have experienced trauma react in very strong ways, the fight or flight response can be incredibly strong… because they feel threatened. So the thing that’s important for the foster parents is to give love, not hate or anger, no matter what they give you, you’ve got to give them love back." He further stated that "it’s very easy for us to disconnect from the fact that there are children out there who don’t have a safe home, who don’t feel safe in their home, who are actively being attacked in what is meant to be the safest place for them", and expressed hope that the storyline would expose people to this "on an emotional level". Herbison stated that David and Aaron would find ways to negotiate their different opinions through experiencing parenthood, and ultimately become a stronger couple.

Emmett left the series at the conclusion of his storyline, after choosing to live with his aunt in New Zealand. This created tension for David and Aaron, as David had attempted to convince Emmett to stay with them while Aaron encouraged him to make his own decision. The following year, Emmett returned following Brent's reappearance.

=== Planned departure and conclusion ===
In 2021, Honda informed producers of his intention to leave the role at the end of his contract. A major storyline was devised to lead to David's exit, which began with a number of characters visiting the fictional River Bend resort. The getaway also provided a turning point for the recently introduced character Freya Wozniak (Phoebe Roberts), who had been searching for her partner, Gareth Bateman (Jack Pearson) after he went on the run from a criminal gang. Gareth surfaced at River Bend, revealing that he was in league with the gang and attempting to kill Freya and Levi Canning (Richie Morris) to cover his tracks. David was not initially at the getaway, but decided to drive there with Amy Greenwood (Jacinta Stapleton), with the intention of making up with Aaron after their recent arguments. While travelling to the resort they find Aaron severely beaten at the side of the road, having become involved in Gareth's attack on Freya. On their way to get Aaron help, David finds that the bus Gareth was driving has crashed with him and Freya inside. With Gareth in a life-threatening condition, David prepares to administer medical aid until Freya tells him that he attacked Aaron. He then allows Gareth to die.

Although David's role in Gareth's death was not revealed prior to its UK broadcast, Honda hinted that audiences would be left asking 'who is David?' and that his "life is about to change in a really big way". He also expressed delight at being involved in dramatic location scenes, having not been part of the Neighbours: Endgame episodes in 2020.

As David's planned exit storyline continued, the truth of his actions was revealed and he was arrested for medical manslaughter. Subsequently, he was imprisoned after failing to return from a family holiday in time and missing his bail check-in. However, Neighbours was cancelled in March 2022, meaning David would remain on-screen until its conclusion. The storyline was therefore truncated and redeveloped to provide a happy ending for David and Aaron, a decision that Honda agreed with. Shortly before the broadcast of "Neighbours: The Finale", which saw a recently released David remain on Ramsay Street, Honda revealed his earlier decision to quit the role and that David's 2022 storyline was designed to write him out of the series. Honda admitted that he did not know the full details of how the story would have developed if it had proceeded as planned, but nevertheless stated "I don't think the audience will feel robbed of that story having closure". Honda expressed his pleasure over the entirety of David's arc on screen, highlighting the "strength" he found through coming out and the challenge to his morality over the previous year. Honda hoped that the audience "appreciates the effort to maintain that arc and make it a full thing, rather than each storyline being separate".

=== Return and death ===
When Neighbours returned in September 2023, Honda was not initially part of its cast. Dialogue confirmed that David, Aaron and Nicolette had all moved away following the breakdown of Paul and Terese's marriage. However, in October 2023 it was announced that Honda would be returning to the show the following month.

On 13 November 2023 David returned alongside Aaron and Nicolette (now played by Hannah Monson). Honda explained that his decision to return was prompted by the storyline offered to him and Wilson: "Ultimately, I think for both of us the story that Jason Herbison, our executive producer, pitched to us was something that was really intriguing to get us back onto the show and kick it off and the larger story that was happening on the show itself. We could tell that there was something different happening on the show, so we wanted to be a part of that really". Both actors praised the interrelationship of concurrent storylines in Neighbours following its return. Honda also spoke positively of the secrecy around the characters' return and the "fun" of filming in secret.

Part of David's return storyline saw him maintain a grudge against Paul, after his actions caused David, Aaron and Nicolette to flee Erinsborough. Honda suggested that "David has a huge, immense amount of love for Paul; and that's the reason why he has such a strong reaction and why he's so against Paul". He further observed that audiences had begun to turn against David, as "he's in opposition to Paul... But that's the brilliance of Stefan Dennis. If you go up against Paul on this show, you have to expect the audience is going to be on his side".

David's exit from the series aired in February 2024, when David was involved in a storyline which was promoted as culminating in a character's death. The storyline involved a holiday taken by David, Aaron, Nicolette, Leo and Krista Sinclair (Majella Davis). Leo and Krista are confronted by Eden Shaw (Costa D'Angelo), who attacks Leo. Upon seeing Eden preparing to strike Leo with a rock, David tackles him and the two fall off a cliffside. Honda posted on Instagram in praise of the stunt team who worked on the scene, disclosing that it needed to be performed "a bunch of times" to be timed correctly. He also described the following day's instalment as "a special episode".

The following day's episode saw David die from his injuries, after he insists Aaron and Leo rescue Eden before him. Honda revealed that David's death had been planned from the beginning of his return, and its heroic aspect had convinced him to reprise the role. He stated that he had wished to "finish David off properly" after his previous conclusion as part of the show's 2022 finale; the provided a contrast to David's earlier planned exit by showing him save a villainous character's life rather than letting them die. Honda reflected that David "started off as this reserved, closeted man who didn't have all this confidence in the world outside of when he was working - now, he's in a place where he's being a hero and saving his brother's life. So I feel like of all the endings you could've predicted for David when he was first on screen, I don't think this would've been one of them."

Explaining the decision to kill David, Herbison explained that "we felt it was crucial to see David, Aaron and Nicolette together as a modern family unit once more, before we formulated a story that would allow the others to stay if David left. In soap tradition, that meant a tragic death." Script producer Shane Isheev revealed that writer Paul Gartside was chosen to script the episode as he had also written David and Aaron's wedding. Honda acknowledged that "it was a wonderful storyline that they'd come up with and I think it's a beautiful send-off for the character and everyone around me". He expressed hope that the audience would be moved by David's death, despite their recent ambivalent response towards him. He approved of the decision to kill David, believing that he would only leave his family by dying or returning to jail and viewing the latter as a "lame" option. He also viewed David's death as beneficial for his own mental health, as it put "a line in the sand". Honda stated that "the way that the show has built this story, and also executed it at such a high level, means that it hopefully will go down as one of the major deaths in Neighbours history for good reasons and not bad ones".

Honda further stated that he was allowed input into the realisation of the storyline, particularly through the voice memo that David records for Aaron before he dies, which was agreed upon but not initially included in the episode's script. The voice memo allowed David to urge Aaron to move on, though Honda mused that the nature of Neighbours may cause this to happen sooner than his character would like. Writing on Instagram after his exit aired, Honda connected his motivation to film the voice memo to his own mother, who suffered from Alzheimer's disease and died while the storyline was being filmed. As his mother had never been fully cognisant of his role on Neighbours due to her illness, Honda viewed the scene, and his ability to complete the role despite his bereavement, as a testament to her pride in his success.

== Storylines ==
While visiting his great-grandmother at Erinsborough Hospital, David befriends Paige Smith (Olympia Valance), who tells him about Angelina Jackson (Sarah Howett), a patient who has a brain tumour. When Karl Kennedy (Alan Fletcher) comes to check on Paige, David introduces himself and reveals that he is a first-year resident at a hospital in Sydney. He offers to contact renowned neurosurgeon Dr. Anward Adisa (Yasmin Bushby) about Angelina, earning Paige's gratitude. While talking to Karl about his residency, David memorises Karl's hospital system password. Aaron asks David and Leo about volunteering for the Blaze Outreach program and David drops off a first aid kit to Amy. She later catches him logging onto a computer using Karl's details. He admits to her and Karl that he is looking for his father, and Karl later finds information about a man named Bradley, who was banned from seeing David and Leo's mother in the hospital. Aaron sets David and Amy up on a date.

David asks Kazuko about his father but she cannot remember. David takes Kazuko out for the day. His friend Aaron Brennan brings a golf cart to them, so Kazuko does not have to walk. David shows Kazuko a picture of Bradley Satchwell, but she denies knowing him. She refuses to tell David who his father is and asks to be taken back to the hospital. David confides in Father Jack that he likes men. In hospital Kazuko's condition worsens and she tells David to renounce homosexuality, just before she dies. David tells Aaron to never speak to him again and tells Jack he was just confused about his sexuality. David supports Paige when she learns she is pregnant, and he helps her when she suffers a miscarriage scare. They later agree to tell everyone that he is the father of her baby, as Paige feels she is unable to reveal who the real father is. Paige's ex-boyfriend, Father Jack is jealous of David and Paige's friendship, and that David is being named as the father of his baby.

David and Leo want to know about their father. At first they think it may be a homeless man named Bradley Satchwell, who is taken to the hospital, where a blood test proves that he is not. Then new evidence indicates that their father may be a man named Hiro, who died a year ago, and was related to the Udagawas. His relative Jasmine tries to prevent David and Leo from investigating the family link. Clive Gibbons (Geoff Paine) investigates an old lead but can find no evidence of Hiro being related to the Tanakas. Kim denies that Hiro is the father. When Leo and Amy go on a weekend break together intending to sleep together, Kim confesses that Amy's father Paul is the twin's father. David spends time with Paul and they begin to bond. He then decides to tell Leo, Paul and Amy that he is gay. David kisses Aaron, but feels rejected when Aaron tells him that he needs to date other men first to understand who he is. David is involved in an accident, when Amy's Ute crashes into the backpackers injuring both Piper Willis (Mavournee Hazel) and himself. The doctors' fear he may have brain damage and may have problems with his memory and speech, leaving Paul and Leo worried.

While he is recovering, David flirts with his nurse Will Dempier (Christian Heath). Will later accuses David of reporting him for inappropriate behaviour, but Paul admits that he made the complaint. David invites Will out for a drink, and explains that he has only just come out and is nervous. Will walks David home and they kiss, but Will later declines to go on another date. David then dates Aaron's former partner Tom Quill (Kane Felsinger), but Tom ends their relationship when he realises David is more invested in it than he is. David then suspects that Tom broke up with him to rekindle his relationship with Aaron, leading to him falling out with Aaron. David risks his job to treat Leo's friend Mannix Foster (Sam Webb), who has been stabbed. He steals painkillers from the hospital and tells Leo their sibling relationship is over. When Xanthe Canning (Lilly Van der Meer) is accused of taking the painkillers, David confesses his guilt to Clive Gibbons (Geoff Paine). Aaron and David make up and begin a relationship. When David and Leo receive an eviction notice, Aaron invites him to move in with him. But Paul buys the apartment next door to his and joins them together, so David chooses to stay with his family. He decides to propose to Aaron, who does not accept and walks off. He later explains to David that he felt overwhelmed, and also distracted by his brothers' problems. David admits it was intended as more of a gesture to show he was serious about their relationship. However, Aaron and David later propose to each other and marry, before buying 32 Ramsay Street with a view to starting a family in the future.

When the sociopathic Finn Kelly (Rob Mills) awakes from a coma with retrograde amnesia, David is fascinated by his case and regularly meets with Finn to study his psychological development. After David learns Aaron has kept Ned Willis's (Ben Hall) involvement in an illegal fight club from him, they argue and David goes out for a bike ride. He is struck by Amy's ute, which is being driven by a tired Kyle Canning (Chris Milligan). Paul's wife Terese Willis (Rebekah Elmaloglou) finds David and he is rushed to hospital, where he has to undergo surgery to remove a kidney. When the other kidney starts to fail, David is put on dialysis and a donor is sought. David's condition worsens when he gets an infection and his other organs start to shut down. Leo flies back to Erinsborough to get tested, but he is not a match. Harlow Robinson (Jemma Donovan) asks her father Robert Robinson (Adam Hunter) to get tested and when he is found to be a match, he agrees to donate his kidney. Shortly before the surgery, Robert escapes from the hospital. Harlow persuades him to return and he goes through with the transplant. As he recovers, David reads his medical file and learns Roxy Willis (Zima Anderson) was also a match. She apologises for not telling anyone, as she was scared, and David forgives her.

David and Aaron plan on having a child via surrogate, and ask Pierce's former partner Lisa Rowsthorn (Jane Allsop) to be their surrogate, but Lisa declines when she finds out she is already pregnant. When Finn's memories return and he murders Gary Canning (Damien Richardson), David blames himself for not noticing anything suspicious. David and Aaron become foster parents to teenager Emmett Donaldson (Ezra Justin), despite initially requesting a younger child, and soon form a close bond with him. They later take in Emmett's older brother, Brent Colefax (Texas Watterston), as well. After both boys leave, David and Aaron renew their investigation into conceiving through a surrogate, with David as biological father due to Aaron carrying the Huntington's disease gene, and are stunned when their housemate Nicolette Stone (Charlotte Chimes) offers to carry their baby. Although Nicolette successfully conceives, matters are complicated when she begins a relationship with Aaron's sister Chloe Brennan (April Rose Pengilly), and Emmett and Brent return for a time. David also struggles to trust that Nicolette will honour their agreement to relinquish primary care of the baby to David and Aaron.

When Nicolette suddenly leaves Erinsborough close to her due date, David is distraught and risks his career by attempting to find information on her whereabouts through medical records. He also disowns Leo for scheming to come between Chloe and Nicolette, and accuses Aaron of caring less about their child, but eventually works through his anger. Paul searches for Nicolette and returns to Erinsborough with Abigail Tanaka (Mary Finn), who is believed to be Nicolette, David and Aaron's daughter, Isla Tanaka-Brennan (Axelle Austin; also Finn). Paul later tells David that he paid Nicolette to stay away, and he reluctantly agrees to not inform Aaron, Terese or Jane. Subsequently, David persuades Jesse Porter (Cameron Robbie) to distance himself from Terese to prevent Paul's bribe from coming to light. Their deceptions are exposed when Abigail's mother, Britney Barnes (Montana Cox), briefly kidnaps her baby, prompting Nicolette to return and reveal the truth about the two infants. David, Aaron and Nicolette then uneasily begin to co-parent Isla, despite the trust issues between them. Fearful of Nicolette running away again, David and Aaron use Paul's help to hire lawyers in an attempt to gain full custody, but eventually agree to a shared parenting arrangement.

Driving to join Aaron at the River Bend resort, David finds him at the side of a road in a severely beaten state. When David then encounters a critically injured Gareth Bateman (Jack Pearson), who has been thrown out of a bus windscreen, Freya Wozniak (Phoebe Roberts) informs him that he is Aaron's attacker as he prepares to treat his injuries. David hesitates and allows Gareth to die in front of him, and subsequently disposes of his medical equipment to cover his behaviour. When the truth is eventually exposed, David is arrested for medical manslaughter. Although he is initially granted bail, after a mishap causes him to miss his police check-in he is held on remand. In prison David is exposed to Gareth's associates, while Freya and his family are blackmailed with his life by Emma McIver (Jessica Clarke) in Erinsborough. David narrowly avoids being killed before the authorities intervene and he is released from prison. Now reunited with his family, David joins them in deciding to move to New York with Paul, before the latter's reunion with Terese changes their plans.

Two years later, David, Aaron, Nicolette and Isla have moved to the country, where they run a guest house, after Paul involved them in the cover-up over Krista Sinclair's (Majella Davis) apparent death and jilted Terese at their vow renewal. David has disowned Paul over his behaviour, but returns to Erinsborough with his family upon learning that Melanie Pearson (Lucinda Cowden) is revealing the truth to Terese and Toadie Rebecchi (Ryan Moloney), who she is now married to. Nevertheless, David refuses to consider a permanent move back to Ramsay Street, despite Aaron and Nicolette's wishes to the contrary, and even demands that Aaron choose between Erinsborough and him. When Krista is found alive, having been held captive by Eden Shaw (Costa D'Angelo), David bonds with her as she recovers from drug addiction. Krista's offer to employ David as her sober companion causes David to relent and agree to move back to Erinsborough, although he continues to insist that Paul has no role in his or Isla's life. The family move in with Nicolette's mother, Jane Harris (Annie Jones), but after an intimate moment between David and Aaron is interrupted by Jane the couple agree with Leo to repurchase 32 Ramsay Street. They also decide to explore having another child together. David, Aaron, Nicolette, Leo and Krista holiday at a rural retreat, but shortly after they arrive Eden confronts Krista, having been tipped off to her location by Paul. David and Aaron hear cries and find Eden and Leo fighting by a cliffside. Seeing Eden preparing to strike Leo with a rock, David intervenes and wrestles Eden over the edge. David comes round at the bottom of the cliff to find that Eden is severely hurt. When Aaron and Leo find the two men below, David insists they should rescue Eden first. They do so, and upon their return find David dead, having concealed a life-threatening injury. Later, Aaron finds a voice memo on David's phone, where he insists that he had to save Eden's life, gives Paul his forgiveness and says goodbye to his family. Two months after his death Aaron receives a phone call that apparently comes from David, which turns out to be a deepfake.

== Reception ==
David and Aaron's partnership was nominated for Best Soap Couple at the 2018 Digital Spy Reader Awards; they came in seventh place with 5.3% of the total votes.

Daniel Kilkelly (Digital Spy) viewed the Road Trip webisodes and observed David as "less confident and a whole lot more insecure" than Leo. He added that the character appeared to have a bigger conscience than his twin. Annabel Ross of The Canberra Times said that Neighbours used "some refreshingly real terminology" when David and Paige discussed his sexuality. She added that she could never imagine the same conversation being screened on rival soap opera Home and Away. Lewis Corner (Gay Times) said that "our temperature has suddenly soared" following David's introduction to the show. The character's sexuality storyline also re-engaged his attention to the show. Sandra Powell writing for What's on TV believed that David had been "a man on a mission" from the beginning in his quest to find his father. Writing for Stuff.co.nz, Kerry Harvey said "the twins are starkly different in personality with David a doctor with a social conscience, while Kano's Leo is a shameful opportunist." A writer from Soap World said "ever since the mysterious Tanaka brothers arrived in Erinsborough questions about David’s love life have been swirling." They added that David and Aaron's scenes were "fraught with tension".

Anthony D. Langford often scrutinised the character in his weekly TVSource Magazine column. He leveled criticism at Neighbours' slow writing and development of David's paternity mystery, personality and relationships. He believed that David's sexuality story was too long-winded. When David began to regret posing as the father to Paige's child, the critic commented, "I'm glad as this story has dragged on long enough." Of David's paternity, the columnist opined that it was a story that became "bigger" as it progressed and appeared to be linked to the show's history. He added his hopes of the Tanaka's father being an important character to the show or it risked the storyline being aired for no reason.

He also took issue with David's possible romance with Aaron, opining that the two did not share enough screen-time to form a relationship. In addition he accused the show of missing out important scenes the two could have shared. Langford grew so tired of waiting that he later scathed "this show is dragging out Aaron and David getting together to the point of it being ridiculous." He also pondered whether Neighbours were intentionally avoiding the portrayal of gay male intimacy. Langford was also unsure David and Aaron were well matched. He branded David as an "okay" character lacking personality. He did not believe Aaron should be partnered with yet another "bland nice guy" such as David, as it risked writers being unable to create stories for the "dull coupling". In 2022, Sam Strutt of The Guardian compiled a feature counting down the top ten most memorable moments from Neighbours. Strutt listed David and Aaron's wedding as the eighth most memorable. Strutt branded it the show's most memorable wedding since the ceremony of Scott Robinson and Charlene Mitchell.
