= Amy Williams (Neighbours) =

- Neighbours character
- Zoe Cramond as Amy Williams (2017)
- Portrayed by: Nicolette Minster (1988); Sheridan Compagnino (1992); Zoe Cramond (2015–2022)
- Duration: 1988, 1992, 2015–2020, 2022
- First appearance: 25 May 1988
- Last appearance: 25 July 2022
- Introduced by: Don Battye (1988); Jason Herbison (2015)
- Spin-off appearances: Summer Stories (2016); Neighbours vs Time Travel (2017)
In-universe information
- Other names: Amy Robinson
- Occupation: Student; Carpenter; Owner of The Handywoman
- Family: Robinson
- Father: Paul Robinson
- Mother: Nina Williams
- Stepfather: Bruce
- Stepmother: Christina Alessi; Terese Willis
- Half-brothers: David Tanaka; Leo Tanaka; Cameron Robinson; Robert Robinson; Andrew Robinson
- Half-sisters: Elle Robinson
- Husband: Liam Barnett (divorced)
- Sons: Jimmy Williams
- Grandfathers: Jim Robinson
- Aunts: Lucy Robinson
- Nieces: Harlow Robinson
- First cousins: Daniel Robinson; Madison Robinson
- Other relatives: Helen Daniels; Hilary Robinson

Amy Williams (also Robinson) is a fictional character from the Australian soap opera Neighbours, played by Zoe Cramond. The character was originally played by child actress Nicolette Minster in 1988, while Sheridan Compagnino took over the role for Amy's reappearance in 1992. In May 2015, it was announced Amy would be returning to Neighbours and Cramond was cast in the role. She made her first screen appearance as Amy on 2 June 2015. Amy is the eldest child of Paul Robinson (Stefan Dennis).

The character's early storylines focused on meeting and getting to know her father and his family. Following her return in 2015, Amy is portrayed as being straightforward, opinionated, complex and independent. She is a qualified carpenter and Cramond hoped Amy would be a good role model for female viewers who wanted a similar occupation. Amy is a single mother to Jimmy Williams (Darcy Tadich), Paul's first grandchild. Amy struggles to reconcile with her father and Cramond said Amy had much pain to deal with. Amy's later storylines included the introduction of her former husband Liam Barnett (James Beck), a relationship with Kyle Canning (Chris Milligan), and a relationship with Leo Tanaka (Tim Kano), which ends when he is revealed to be her half-brother. Cramond's departure from the show aired on 1 January 2020. She made a brief appearance on 30 March 2020 and returned for the final episodes of Neighbours on 25 July 2022.

== Creation and casting ==
Amy was introduced to Neighbours as the first child of established character Paul Robinson (Stefan Dennis). Nicolette Minster was cast as Amy when she was around three years old. Paul was unaware that he had fathered a child, until his former colleague Nina Williams (Leigh Morgan) brought Amy with her to Erinsborough. Nina admitted to Paul that Amy was the result of "a short fling" they had during their time working for the airlines. When the character returned to the show in 1992, Sheridan Compagnino took over the role. Paul brought Amy back to Erinsborough as he had realised that he wanted Amy to get to know him better.

In March 2015, it was announced that a storyline would see Paul trying to find Amy after receiving a cancer diagnosis. On 17 May 2015, it was confirmed that Amy would be re-introduced to Neighbours with Zoe Cramond taking over the role. Cramond was cast in March. Cramond commented, "I grew up watching Neighbours so it is a big thrill for me to be part of the show." Cramond said that the many elements of Amy's personality had attracted her to the role.

== Development ==
=== Characterisation ===
Cramond described Amy "very straightforward yet quite complex". While a writer for Amy's profile on the Neighbours website called her "fiercely independent". Cramond admitted that she shared some similarities with Amy, including her opinionated side. She continued, "When I'm getting involved with a character I like to go straight to my qualities as a person and kind of work from there, it's a nice way to discover a character." Amy is a qualified carpenter and Cramond liked that Amy was a female "tradie", as it made her unique. Cramond called her brother and uncle for advice as they are both builders. She wanted to get it right and said, "I grew up with builders in the family so it's not as if I don't know which end to hold a saw." Cramond hoped the character would be a good role model for girls who wanted a similar job.

=== Family ===
"Amy and Paul have a lot to work through, and that's going to be very interesting. Amy doesn't know her father, so trying to determine if he is genuine or not is difficult for her. But there's lots of fun and exciting drama to come!"

— Cramond on Amy and Paul's relationship

Amy's relationship with her stepmother Christina (Gayle Blakeney) was difficult and they argued upon her reintroduction in 1992. Lisa Anthony from BIG! magazine observed two as being "at each other's throats" while Paul was caught in the middle of their bickering. Amy also stressed that she did not want to live with Paul which caused arguments between them too. Following one such altercation Amy ran in front of Paul's reversing car and he knocked her down. Amy is left unconscious and stops breathing.

When Amy turned up unannounced at Paul's penthouse, he initially failed to recognise her. Cramond said Amy felt "really hurt and angry" by his reaction and let him know it. Amy came to confront Paul, but deep down she wanted a relationship with her father. Cramond explained, "This is the first time she's seen her dad since she was a child, so she gets to say all the things she's wanted to say to him for all these years." Amy struggled to get past the hurt caused by Paul's absence and she became conflicted about staying. Cramond admitted to being "transfixed" by the character of Paul Robinson and told Russell Blackstock of The New Zealand Herald that it was "a bit surreal" playing his daughter and arguing with him. When asked if she could reconcile with an absentee father, Cramond explained that it was a hard question to answer. She thought that Amy had "a lot of pain" to confront and added "because of her son she wants them to have a relationship and through that, without her even realising at first, she develops a connection with her dad again."

Amy was reintroduced along with her young son and Paul's first grandchild Jimmy (Darcy Tadich). Amy profile states that as a single mother, Amy would do anything for her son. Cramond called Tadich fun to act alongside and said he was "such a sweet boy!" Amy is separated from Jimmy's father, as he was unreliable and eventually betrayed her. Amy was not planning to stay around after reconciling with Paul, but after securing employment and realising how much Jimmy needed to get to know his grandfather, Amy decided to stay. Shortly after returning to Erinsborough, Amy befriended Sonya Rebecchi (Eve Morey) and arranged to do some work around her house. Amy also developed a friendship with a newly returned Stephanie Scully (Carla Bonner). When Jimmy went missing, Paul immediately accused Steph of taking him because of her history. But Amy refused to believe it as she liked Steph. Amy's former husband Liam Barnett (James Beck) then admitted that he was in debt to a loan shark and believed Jimmy may have been kidnapped for ransom. Amy was "furious" with Liam for putting their son in danger. Cramond told an Inside Soap columnist, "She irrationally lashes out at him in the heat of the moment – Jimmy means the world to Amy, so she wants Liam to pay for what he's done." When Liam's loan shark denied taking Jimmy, Steph become the prime suspect again.

=== Relationships ===
==== Kyle Canning ====
Amy begins working closely with Kyle Canning (Chris Milligan), whose wife is overseas. When asked if there would be a romance between them, Cramond replied "Who knows? They clash at the beginning, but soon become good mates!" Amy and Kyle eventually develop a strong friendship. Their bond grows when they spend much time together trying to replace a lost teddy bear. Amy and Kyle develop feelings for each other, but they miss the chance to be together due to his marital problems and the arrival of her former husband Liam. Kyle later dates Shay Daeng (Yasmin Kassim), but there is still a "spark" between him and Amy, which becomes clear to everyone when they compete in a pool competition. Kyle later kisses Amy.

Georgia sends Kyle a letter telling him she wants him back, causing Kyle to put off making Christmas plans with Amy, who is hurt by his lack of commitment to their relationship. Georgia later returns to Erinsborough and Amy finds her and Kyle kissing in a hotel room. Amy is "devastated" by Kyle's betrayal and flees the room just as the hotel's boiler explodes, which briefly traps her and Kyle in a lift. Kyle ends his relationship with Amy and decides to move to Germany with Georgia. He offers Amy his half of the handyman business and explains to Jimmy his reasons for leaving. Milligan reprised his role a few months later and Kyle returns for Sheila's 60th birthday party. Amy initially pretends that she has been coping without Kyle, but she later lashes out at his failure to acknowledge how much he hurt her. Amy decides that she and Jimmy should leave Number 26, causing Jimmy to confront Kyle for disrupting their lives.

==== Leo Tanaka ====
Amy develops an on-off relationship with Paul's rival Leo Tanaka (Tim Kano), as she helps him and his brother David Tanaka (Takaya Honda) to find their father. Of Amy and Leo's early relationship, Cramond said "I think there's something that draws her towards him but he just keeps letting her down and that's kind of a repetition of all the men in Amy's life." Leo pursues Amy for a number weeks and she initially resists his advances, until he finally persuades her to go out on a date with him. Amy and Leo have a good time, until Elly Conway (Jodi Anasta) interrupts the date and reveals that she and Leo had a bet about whether he could get Amy to go out with him by Christmas. Kano commented that Amy was "furious and heartbroken" by Leo's actions. Amy thought the relationship was going somewhere and she feels let down and embarrassed.

Amy and Leo later reconcile and begin dating. Shortly before they have sex, they learn that Paul is David and Leo's father, making them half-siblings. Cramond called the revelation "awkward… horrible… mortifying." The actress also said that it would be hard for both of them to move on and repair their relationship. Cramond explained that Amy has bad luck with romance and is always falling for the "wrong kind of guys". She confirmed that Amy would have further bad luck with romance when she dates a man with a criminal past.

=== Departure and return ===
Cramond's departure from Neighbours was confirmed on 10 December 2019, and her final scenes aired on 1 January 2020. Amy's exit storyline sees her move to New York City on a permanent basis, so she can be with her son, Jimmy. Tadich reprised his role to facilitate the character's exit. Amy learns beforehand that Jimmy has been going through "a troublesome teenage phase" and he briefly goes missing, before turning up in Erinsborough. His arrival allows the two to talk and Amy gets him to open up about his issues. She helps out Jimmy's girlfriend, who is the victim of domestic violence, and decides to fly out to New York after Christmas to check on the situation. Jimmy later admits that he wants her to be with him permanently. Amy's exit also leads to the break up of her relationship with Kyle, as she tells him she needs a fresh start. Of the character's departure, series producer Jason Herbison explained: "2019 was a turbulent year for Amy and she ultimately makes the right decision for herself. Jimmy is very much a factor in her plans, so in many ways, she's come full circle since she arrived in the show." Herbison also confirmed that Amy's exit would have repercussions for Kyle and his future relationships. Cramond reprised the role for a brief appearance on 30 March 2020, as Amy appears via video call after learning of Gary Canning's (Damien Richardson) death.

On 7 May 2022, Dan Seddon of Digital Spy announced Cramond had reprised the role of Amy for the final episodes of Neighbours following its cancellation. Cramond was one of many cast members who agreed to return for the show's final stories. The "most memorable characters" from each decade were chosen to return and Executive producer Herbison explained that it ensured there was "something for everyone as Neighbours draws to a close."

== Storylines ==
=== 1988–1992 ===
When Nina Williams comes to Erinsborough for a conference, she brings her young daughter Amy with her. Nina runs into her ex-boyfriend Paul Robinson and he meets Amy. Upon learning that she is three-and-a-half, Paul works out that he could be Amy's father, as they broke up four years ago. Nina admits that he is and Paul is angry that Nina never told him. Nina explains that Amy is happy and gets on well with Nina's fiancé Bruce, who thinks of her as his own. Paul's wife, Gail (Fiona Corke), talks with Nina and tells her that Amy deserves to be told who her father is. Before they leave, Nina tells Paul that he can set up a trust fund for Amy and she will keep him up to date with her progress. Amy gives Paul a kiss goodbye.

Four years later, Paul visits Amy in New Zealand and brings her to Erinsborough. Amy's arrival upsets Paul's wife, Christina and their relationship gets off to a bad start. Amy bonds with Christina's sister, Caroline (Gillian Blakeney). When Paul and Amy argue about him enrolling her in Erinsborough Primary School, she tells Caroline that no one likes her. Caroline explains that things are new and she will love school. Amy runs away and Paul accidentally hits her with his car, knocking her unconscious. She is rushed to hospital, but is not badly hurt. Paul apologises to Amy and asks if they can start again. Amy befriends Toby Mangel (Ben Geurens) and they explore an old house together that Paul is thinking of buying. Amy brings home a hand grenade that she found and tries to pull the ring out. Toby takes the grenade from Amy, but the ring is pulled and Toby yells out to Doug Willis (Terence Donovan). Doug throws the grenade into the lake as it explodes. Amy develops a crush on Toby, but he does not reciprocate her feelings. They try to earn some money by cleaning cars, but their day is cut short when Christina tells Amy that Nina wants her to come home. Amy says her goodbyes, before Paul takes her to the airport.

=== 2015–2020 ===
Amy comes to Ramsay Street looking for Naomi Canning (Morgana O'Reilly), Paul's assistant. Kyle Canning directs Amy to the Lassiter's Complex, where Amy helps Sonya Rebecchi change a car tyre. Kyle stops by to tell Amy that Naomi is likely to be at Paul's penthouse. Amy takes Naomi's swipe card from reception and goes up to see Paul. She is angered when he does not initially recognise her and tells him not to contact her again. Amy backs into Sonya's daughter's stroller and offers to complete carpentry jobs around Sonya's house to make up for it. Her cousin Daniel Robinson (Tim Phillipps) seeks her out and tries to make Amy stay, but she refuses to give Paul another chance and leaves. Daniel flies to Mount Merrion to see Amy and finds that debt collectors are taking her possessions. Daniel buys her tools for her and asks her to return to Erinsborough. She agrees, telling Daniel that she is doing it for her son Jimmy. Amy introduces Jimmy to Paul and they move in with Sonya and her family. Jimmy briefly goes missing, but he is found at The Waterhole looking for Paul. Amy gets a job with Kyle's handyman business. After she allows Paul to look after Jimmy, Amy is angered when he spoils his grandson and she returns the gifts. Amy softens towards Paul when she learns that he kept a drawing she did for him when she was younger.

When she is sexually harassed by another handyman, Amy initially dismisses it. However, she eventually asks Kyle to file an official complaint and convinces Paul to give Kyle his job back after he is fired. Sheila Canning (Colette Mann) convinces Amy to enter a competition to find Victoria's Most Unique Tradie and she wins, beating Kyle. After the last job for the council's beautification project is done, Amy states her intention to move on, but Kyle offers her a permanent job. Amy unintentionally throws out Nell Rebecchi's (Scarlett Anderson) favourite teddy bear and Kyle offers to help her retrieve it. Amy thanks Kyle with a hug, which goes on too long. She decides that she needs to leave Erinsborough, against Jimmy and Paul's wishes. She reconsiders after Paul offers her a job as his executive assistant. Amy struggles with the job and quits when she makes a mistake with some work emails, costing Lassiter's money. After talking with Kyle, Amy starts working for him again. She also helps Sonya out with Nell, after Toadie is injured. After Kyle's wife ends their marriage, he kisses Amy. She later admits that there is a spark between them.

Amy's former husband Liam Barnett comes to visit Jimmy. Kyle questions Liam's motives, but agrees to back off when Amy asks him to. Amy and Liam spend time together and have sex. Jimmy goes missing and when Liam is questioned by the police, he reveals to Amy that he stole Toadie and Sonya's benefit fund and then trashed Harold's Cafe as he is in debt. Stephanie Scully finds Jimmy hiding in the school. Amy asks Liam not to contact her or Jimmy and he leaves. Amy moves in with Kyle and Sheila. She becomes jealous when Kyle dates Shay Daeng (Yasmin Kassim), but he breaks up with her to begin a relationship with Amy. Amy agrees to work with Paul, making gazebos, but changes her mind when she learns Paul tried to gaslight Steph. Amy's mother Nina, now calling herself Nene (now Ally Fowler) comes to see her and Jimmy. Amy reads a letter from Georgia to Kyle and becomes insecure about their relationship, so she spontaneously proposes to Kyle. She then admits to reading the letter and their relationship is strained. Amy sees Kyle kissing Georgia at Lassiter's, shortly before the hotel's boiler room explodes. Amy and Kyle are trapped in the lift together and Kyle receives an electric shock. After they are rescued, Amy tells Kyle to be with Georgia and he leaves Erinsborough.

Amy buys Kyle's business from him and renames it The Handywoman. She briefly employs Jack Callahan (Andrew Morley), before he recovers his memory. Amy distances herself from Paul when he is accused of causing the hotel explosion, but later reconciles with him, though remains unsure of whether he is guilty. Amy is approached by her former employer Ryan Prescott (James Sweeny), who calls her Anika. Amy tells Aaron Brennan (Matt Wilson) that Ryan runs a cleaning company that employs women to clean in lingerie, and she used to work for him when she had financial struggles. Amy refuses to help Ryan save his business and he threatens to reveal her secret. Jimmy is struck by a car and Amy turns to Father Jack for religious guidance. Paul later learns the truth about Ryan and accidentally exposes Amy's past in the papers. Amy decides to take control of her past and promotes her business in her old cleaning outfit. Amy goes on a date with Gregory Jenkins (Kevin Kiernan-Molloy), but leaves his hotel room before anything happens between them. Amy later discovers that Greg has given her a wrong number and that he also invited Elly Conway (Jodi Anasta) to his room. Amy later learns Greg worked for Ryan placing hidden cameras around the hotel. She meets with Ryan in an attempt to get the footage, but he catches her trying to steal his hard drive.

Amy befriends David Tanaka (Takaya Honda) and when she catches him logging onto a hospital computer, he admits that he is looking for his father. Aaron and Amy go on a double date with David and his brother Leo Tanaka (Tim Kano). When Leo flirts with her, she leaves early. Aaron later arranges for Amy to go on a date with David, but he later warns her that David might be gay. Amy and the Canning family appear on Family Feud. Amy tells David that she has feelings for him, but he rejects her. Leo persuades Amy to go to the opera with him, however, he stands her up. Leo later tells Amy that he and David were helping a man they thought could be their father. Amy asks Leo out on a date. They spend the day with his great-grandmother, before going paintballing and then taking a spa together. Just before they kiss, Elly turns up to informs Leo his great-grandmother has fallen unconscious and he leaves. Elly then tells Amy that she and Leo made a $5 bet that he would have sex with her before Christmas. Though angry, Amy eventually forgives Leo and they become friends again. They grow closer romantically, but before they have sex, Leo's mother Kim Tanaka (Jenny Young) and Paul that Leo and David are Paul's sons, making Amy and Leo half-siblings. Amy struggles with the news and her feelings for Leo. She tries to move on by helping out at the church and having a one-night stand.

When her ute is reversed into Leo's backpackers hostel, resulting in David and Piper Willis (Mavournee Hazel) being hospitalised, Amy is initially accused of being the driver, but Sonya later confesses. Amy and Jimmy move into the Lassiter's penthouse apartment with Paul. Amy develops feelings for Toadie when she helps him to find Willow Somers's (Mieke Billing-Smith) biological father. Sonya gives Amy her blessing to pursue a relationship with Toadie, but he tells her that he only sees her as a friend. Amy meets Nick Petrides (Damien Fotiou) at church, and is initially unaware that he is the man who tried to kill Paul by faking a cancer diagnosis. Paul and Leo tells Amy to stay away from Nick, but she refuses as she believes he has changed. They begin a brief relationship, before Paul orchestrates it for Nick to be sent back to prison. This causes a brief rift and Amy and Jimmy move out of the penthouse, although Paul eventually convinces his daughter to forgive him. Despairing about her love life, Amy makes a pact with Elly to swear off men for a hundred days. Paul announces that Amy will be his project manager for his Robinson Heights housing estate development, before she has agreed. Paul later asks Amy to hire Jayden Warley (Khan Oxenham). Jayden is a poor worker and Amy tries to get him to quit, but Leo gives her a warning for workplace bullying. Amy develops a crush on Jayden but he admits to sabotaging the work site after Leo is injured in an accident.

Liam returns to town for a business meeting at Lassiters. He want to make amends with Jimmy, and Amy agrees not to stand in his way. She later learns that Liam went on a blind date with Elly, and gives them her blessing to continue dating. She later admits that she is not okay with the relationship and Elly ends it. Liam explains that he has been offered a business opportunity in New York and the company would be willing to pay for a private school for Jimmy. Amy asks him to leave, but later tells Jimmy about Liam's job offer. He wants to go to New York and Amy allows him to leave with Liam. Amy begins stealing to cope with Jimmy's departure. She covers her actions by telling her family that she has a problem with alcohol, so Paul invites Terese Willis (Rebekah Elmaloglou) to talk to Amy about her battle with alcoholism. Gary Canning (Damien Richardson) catches Amy stealing from Flametree Retreat and insists that she confess to Paul, who persuades her to put the stolen goods in a charity bin. Amy meets Dr. Rob Carson (Christopher Farrell), who is attracted to her. David gives Amy's phone number to Rob, but she ignores his texts. Gary encourages Amy to give Rob a chance, and they have a successful first date. When Rob asks Amy to buy a house with him, she realises that the relationship is moving too fast. Paul gives her a bonus of $100,000, which she gives to Gary after learning that he is in debt to a criminal. Gary admits that he has feelings for Amy, and she breaks up with Rob to pursue a relationship with Gary. Paul is furious when he discovers Gary is dating his daughter and he constantly meddles in their relationship. Amy moves in with the Cannings to get away from Paul. Gary becomes increasingly insecure about the debt he owes Amy, and he takes on a driving job, which sees him moving stolen goods from the Robinson Pines site. When Amy finds out, she breaks up with Gary and moves back to the penthouse.

Gary vows to win Amy back and works several jobs to repay his debt. Amy and Gary's relationship improves, but Sheila's meddling constantly sets them back. Amy eventually tells him to set boundaries with Sheila so they can reconcile. Paul discovers Gary is planning to propose to Amy, and he invites Kyle back to Erinsborough to take over Amy's job at the housing site and cause trouble between his father and his ex-girlfriend. Although Kyle accidentally interrupts Gary's proposal, Amy still accepts. She insists she loves Gary, even though Kyle has separated from Georgia. Paul forces Amy to spend time with Kyle in the hope that her feelings for him will return. Gary brings Jimmy over for Amy's birthday and arranges a surprise wedding, which she quickly shuts down. After the failed nuptials, Kyle admits he left Georgia to reconcile with Amy. She is shocked, but recommits to Gary.

After several clashes with Paul, Amy realises that she is better off with Kyle and so breaks up with Gary. Their relationship goes smoothly until a plumber finds a hidden video camera in a Lassiter's room she and Kyle had stayed in. After Scarlett Brady (Christie Whelan Browne) is arrested, she leaks the footage of Kyle and Amy to the media. Kyle then decides to launch a class-action suit against Lassiter's with Toadie's help. As a result, Kyle and Amy grow more distant as he commits to seeing the lawsuit through. Kyle's exhaustion leads him to inadvertently strike David with his car, leaving David seriously injured and needing a kidney transplant. Amy restrains Paul when he lashes out at Kyle. Liam informs Amy that Jimmy has been acting strangely, and she soon learns that Kyle had a go at Jimmy during a video call, causing Jimmy to go missing. When Jimmy arrives in Erinsborough, he confuses Amy by stealing a cake and some money from her purse. Amy finds Jimmy at the Backpackers and learns that he is protecting his girlfriend Maya Preston (Hannah Ogawa), who is being abused by her father. Amy subsequently speaks to Maya's mother and helps Maya fly home to New York for Christmas with her grandparents, assuring her she will ensure her safety after David's kidney transplant. Jimmy later confesses that he misses having Amy in his life, and would like her to come to New York with him. After a disagreement with Kyle, which culminates in their break up, Amy agrees and leaves for New York with Jimmy and Leo. A few months later, Amy video-calls Kyle and Sheila after learning of Gary's death. She apologises for not being able to attend the funeral, and Kyle asks her to commemorate Gary in New York.

Two years later, Amy joins her siblings on a video call with Paul. Her half-sister Elle Robinson (Pippa Black) explains that Amy is working on an apartment construction and has a boyfriend. Amy and her siblings then suggest that Paul, David and Leo move to New York to be with them.

== Reception ==
A contributor to the BBC's official Neighbours website said Amy's most notable moment was her arrival. Lisa Anthony from BIG! magazine branded Paul running Amy over as the biggest soap storyline of the week in the United Kingdom. After the character's 2015 return, a Soap World contributor branded her "mysteriously sexy and tomboyish". Carena Crawford from All About Soap branded the character "sassy". While The New Zealand Herald's Russell Blackstock called her a "feisty solo mum". Anthony D. Langford from TheBacklot.com liked Amy, calling her "a great character". He thought she and Kyle had chemistry, but did not want to see Kyle cheat on his wife with her.

Inside Soap's Sarah Ellis also praised the character, saying "Amy's one feisty lady! And luckily, she's sticking around." Ellis later stated "luckily, lovely Amy is nothing like her wicked father." After Amy learned Leo was her brother, a Liverpool Echo reporter felt sorry for her, writing "Poor Amy. She thought she'd found a handsome and reliable young man to give her heart to – and then it turns out he's her halfbrother." A South Wales Echo also commented on her relationship troubles, saying "Amy's choice of potential partners has been dubious, and she adds another this week – Terese's villainous brother Nick."
