= Zoe Cramond =

New Zealand actress (born 1984)

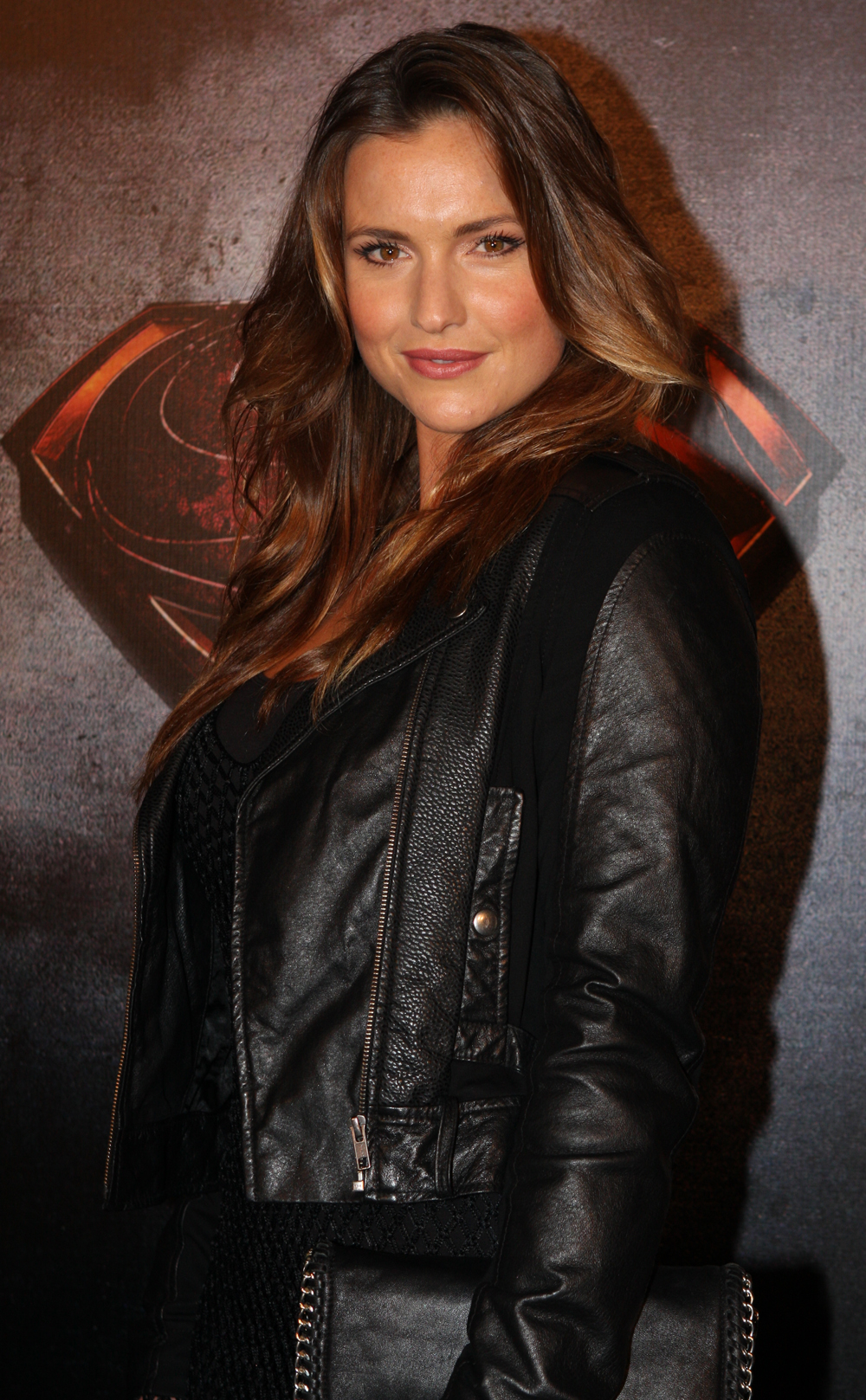
- Zoe Cramond in 2013
- Born: 8 October 1984 (age 42); Papamoa, New Zealand
- Occupation: Actress
- Years active: 2007–present

Zoe Cramond (born 8 October 1984) is a New Zealand actress. After graduating from Unitec Institute of Technology, Cramond appeared in various theatre productions and television commercials. She made appearances in Outrageous Fortune and Shortland Street, before deciding to give up her acting career to study graphic design. She returned to acting after being cast in the television film Panic at Rock Island and Go Girls.

In 2011, Cramond joined the cast of comedy-drama Packed to the Rafters as Emma Mackey, marking her first major role. She relocated to Sydney for filming. Cramond competed in the 12th Season of Dancing with the Stars in 2012. She and her dance partner Aric Yegudkin came in third place. The following year, Cramond filmed a guest appearance in Fat Tony & Co.. From 2015 until 2020, she played Amy Williams in Neighbours, reprising the role in 2022 for the soap's finale.

== Early and personal life ==
Zoe Cramond is from Papamoa, New Zealand. Her parents are both artists, who encouraged her to partake in community theatre, ballet and contemporary dance. Cramond attended Unitec Institute of Technology, where she studied performing arts.

Cramond is a keen surfer. She learned how to surf at Waihi Beach from the age of 14.

== Career ==
After graduating from Unitec, Cramond worked for an underground music station and appeared in several theatre productions and television commercials. She made guest appearances in Outrageous Fortune (2008) and Shortland Street (2009). After struggling to find acting work, Cramond quit to study graphic design. A week later she learned that she had been cast in the television film Panic at Rock Island and had an audition for the New Zealand comedy-drama Go Girls. Cramond joined Go Girls as Amanda, a love interest and eventual wife of main character Kevin (Jay Ryan).

Cramond joined the cast of comedy-drama Packed to the Rafters as Emma Mackey for the fourth season in 2011. Cramond relocated to Sydney for filming. Her character, Emma, was introduced to the show as a potential love interest for Ben Rafter (played by Hugh Sheridan). Cramond remained with the show until its cancellation in 2013.

In 2012, Cramond competed in the 12th Season of Dancing with the Stars. She was partnered with Russian dancer Aric Yegudkin and represented the Spinal Cord Injury Network. During a dance routine, Cramond fractured four ribs, but continued in the competition. Despite being named the favourites to win, Cramond and Yegudkin came in third place.

Cramond appeared as lawyer Zarah Garde-Wilson in Fat Tony & Co. in 2014. She joined the cast of Neighbours the following year, as series regular Amy Williams. Her departure from the serial aired on 1 January 2020. She later reprised the role for the show's then-final episode in 2022.

In 2021, Cramond appeared in the psychological thriller The Secrets She Keeps.

== Filmography ==
Year	Title	Role	Notes
2007	Bridge to Terabithia	Parishioner (uncredited)	Feature film
2008	Outrageous Fortune	Tara	Episode: "The Fatness of These Pursy Times"
2009	Shortland Street	Tamson Katz	Guest
2010–2012	Go Girls	Amanda	Recurring
2010	Panic at Rock Island	Ari	TV film
2011–2013	Packed to the Rafters	Emma Mackey	Main cast
2011	The Fall Guys	Kayley	Feature film
2012	Dancing with the Stars	Contestant	
2014	Fat Tony & Co.	Zarah Garde-Wilson	Episode: "Killers, Thieves & Lawyers"
2015–2020, 2022	Neighbours	Amy Williams	Series regular
2016	Neighbours: Summer Stories	Amy Williams	Webseries
2017	Neighbours V Time Travel	Amy Williams	Webseries
2019	Clover	Claire	Short film
2021	The Secrets She Keeps	Diane Campbell	TV movie
