= Wendy Rodwell =

Fictional character from Neighbours

- Neighbours character
- Portrayed by: Candice Leask
- Duration: 2021–2025
- First appearance: 2 December 2021
- Last appearance: 11 December 2025
- Introduced by: Jason Herbison
In-universe information
- Occupation: Barmaid
- Husband: Andrew Rodwell
- Daughters: Sadie Rodwell

Wendy Rodwell is a fictional character from the Australian soap opera Neighbours, played by Candice Leask. Leask secured the role of Wendy after sending in an audition tape in October 2021, however she was unsure if the character was right for her until she read over the script again. It was Leask's fifth audition for the show. The character was initially meant to only appear in a single episode, but Leask discovered that writers had plans to reintroduce the character the following year to coincide with producers' plans to bring in another busybody character. Leask made her debut on 2 December 2021 and returned in February the following year as a recurring character, as requested by the serial's executive producer, Jason Herbison.

Herbison later teased to Inside Soap that a new family move into Ramsay Street and fans online guessed correctly that it would be the Rodwells. Wendy, her husband, Andrew (Lloyd Will), and their daughter, Sadie (Emerald Chan), move into the street, but are unwelcome. Leask's character was developed some more by producers and writers upon her move into the street to help her fill the shoes created by the departure of nosy neighbour, Sheila Canning (Colette Mann). Wendy was initially unpopular amongst viewers and the character received a negative backlash online, however it was promised that people would "grow to love" her. Wendy eventually became popular, especially following the serial's decision to upgrade all three Rodwells to regular status, which marked them as the final family unit and last regular additions of the show, whose cancellation had been announced in early 2022.

Leask explained that she was "100% grateful" for being able to make it into the final cast and that fan acceptance of Wendy helped her get to understand the character better. She also explained that lost storylines for Wendy included the introduction of a son, the possibility of her becoming the manager of The Waterhole and the exploration of her personality. Critics were also happy with the character's introduction and saw it as progressive inclusivity. Leask herself also advocated for more east Asian representation on screens, something she hoped her character helped out with. Many news publications also reported their wishes that there were more storylines for Wendy and her family. Leask's appeared until the intended finale, broadcast on 28 July 2022, but it was later announced that she would reprise her role in the 2023 Neighbours reboot.

== Creation and casting ==
The character of Wendy Rodwell was introduced as the wife of Andrew Rodwell (Lloyd Will) and the mother of Sadie Rodwell (Emerald Chan). The character's creation and Leask's casting was not disclosed by Neighbours or any media publications until her first appearance, however Leask teased her role on Instagram prior to the airing of her first episode. In October 2021, Leask, who was 37 years old at the time, was informed of the audition by her agent and read the script, but was unaware if she would be able to portray the character well. However after Leask "noticed a lot more things" in common between herself and Wendy, she decided to audition for the role two days later by sending in a self tape, but remained worried that she did not win the producers over. As she "didn't think it would ever happen", Leask reported being "frozen" when she received an email two weeks later informing her that she had secured the part, which marked her fifth and only successful audition on the serial, a show she "really wanted to get on". Leask told Digital Spy's Daniel Kilkelly that she "started jumping up and down" in joy and "was ready to enter Ramsay Street". Leask was placed on a contract that ended on 10 June 2022 and she explained that she had three weeks to prepare for her first scene. Leask thought it was interesting to be a half-Chinese actress and be a member of the last family of Neighbours. She also admitted that she was considering abandoning acting if she did not receive the role. Will explained that he was unaware of the character's creation and was told by producers, who "were like, 'By the way, you've got a family.' And then I'm like, 'Really? Okay, cool, sweet.'" He also revealed that he and Leask only first met on the day of filming their first joint scenes.

== Development ==
=== Characterisation ===
Wendy is portrayed as the hard-working protective mother of a mixed family, as well as the new town gossip, following the departure of Sheila Canning (Colette Mann). Wendy's character was steered to suit that of one who's nosy, as producers "wanted another busybody" in the serial. Script producer Shane Isheev explained that Wendy is "one of those characters who is definitely a gossip, but she doesn't thrive on it as people like Sheila did – her heart is always in the right place." Isheev told Kilkelly that "Wendy always puts her foot in her mouth and that came from watching the actress in the police ball – we took what Candice gave us and ran with it." Isheev also named Wendy an "amalgamation" of Sheila, Lyn Scully (Janet Andrewartha) and Valda Sheergold (Joan Sydney). Leask said that Wendy "was nice and had good intentions" and that she wants everyone to like her, something Leask hoped would be explored in the future. Isheev also said that viewers would "grow to love" Wendy. Wendy and her family were also described as a "new fun working-class family". Leask also explained that she hoped the Rodwell family leads to more cultural representation within soap operas. Wendy was described as a confident mother by Simon Timblick of whattowatch.com. Leask recalled being with Will and saying, "We really want to be on the show! Let's show how much chemistry we can have." Leask, a long-time viewer of the soap, said, "We were very passionate about wanting to be a part of the Neighbours family". Leask also told Kilkelly that she began watching the serial more frequently once she received the role in order "to figure out how I was a part of the storyline, even when I wasn't taking part." Leask later called Wendy "kooky" and "truly optimistic when there are real challenges going on in life", but also described her as "full of anxiety". Leask also said that she would be friends with Wendy in real as "she means well".

=== Introduction ===
Wendy first appears in episode 8747, which was broadcast on 2 December 2021. Wendy is first seen on screens beside her husband, Andrew, at the Erinsborough police ball and accidentally insults Levi Canning's (Richie Morris) polyamorous relationship. Leask said of her first day on set, "The feeling was better than liking someone. That butterfly feeling, it was like I gave that to myself by getting this job that I wanted and I never thought in a million years that I would get on Neighbours." Leask posted on Instagram prior to the broadcast of episode 8747 that she was "BE-YONDDDDD EXCITED" to be on television. Wendy ceased to appear until February the following year, still in a guest capacity, although the writers' original plan was for the character to only have one appearance. Leask had an inkling that Wendy would make another appearance however as Andrew "had already been an on-off character for a year and a half" and she explained, "Andrew Thompson, one of the producers at Neighbours, told us that there was a chance we'd see more of Wendy. When I finished on my second day of shooting, he took me around to meet everyone in production, including the writers. I found out later that they were writing Wendy in more." Additional scenes with Wendy were requested by the serial's executive producer, Jason Herbison.

A new family was teased to Inside Soap by Herbison, who told the publication in March, "We also have a new family moving into the street, so there is a wonderful sense of renewal as well." Digital Spy's Jess Lee immediately claimed there was "a chance that it won't be entirely new characters" and guessed that the Rodwells would be the new family. Fans online also were also "speculating" that it would be the Rodwells following the family's expansion with the introduction of Sadie. Lee also added, "As for which house on Ramsay Street may become vacant, Number 26 seems like the most likely option." A later episode broadcast in April "hinted" that it would be the Rodwells who move into the street, with Andrew and Wendy explaining that their real estate agent has alerted them of the house's sale following their "expressed interest" in the home.

=== Upgrade to regular ===
Wendy, Andrew and Sadie were upgraded to regular characters, which occurred following the news of the serial's cancellation and a month from its intended final episode, making them the last family unit introduced to the show prior to the soap's revival. The Rodwell actors discovered the cancellation a week after their first scenes as regular characters. They were each added to the opening titles, which were first showcased on the Neighbours Twitter page, with the new titles sequence being called a "Friday treat". Leask was surprised of the upgrade and said, "I thought it would just be like popping to the coffee shop and the bar and be like, 'Hi.' Then it was just like 'Wow, all this stuff is happening.'" She also explained that she, Will and Chan were all surprised when they were told that they were being added to the opening titles and revealed that their scene in the titles was purposely filmed to portray Wendy as "overfriendly". Leask also called the Rodwell house set "amazing".

Timblick reported that the Rodwells' arrival would instantly "cause CHAOS!" Wendy finds herself in an awkward position as she tries to befriend her new neighbours, one of which happens to be Hendrix Greyson (Ben Turland), who has been diagnosed with pulmonary fibrosis due to a fire caused by Sadie at Erinsborough High. "In an effort to try and smooth things over with their neighbours", Wendy suggests a moving-in barbecue, but it does not "go to plan" and results in a confrontation between the Rodwells and Hendrix's girlfriend, Mackenzie Hargreaves (Georgie Stone). Leask also said that much of Wendy's first storyline was a "hype" of her advocating to the neighbours to "'please like my daughter, like me, like my husband!'" Stephen Patterson of Metro also reported that Wendy was "determined to make their move as seamless as possible, encouraging Sadie to make amends with everyone". Turland explained that the Rodwells' presence makes Hendrix feel like his diagnosis is constantly in his face and explained that "Every time he sees them, it reminds him of his illness and what's happened to him." Wendy spends the next few days asking principal Susan Kennedy (Jackie Woodburne) to allow Sadie back into Erinsborough High after she and Andrew's budget shows that they do not have the money to move for a second time. Some outlets questioned whether the Rodwells would make an immediate exit from the serial, such as Patterson, who questioned online, "Will the Rodwells be able to co-exist on the same street as Hendrix?"

Wendy later attends her neighbours' engagement party and accidentally knocks Harold Bishop's (Ian Smith) Ramsay Street history book into an icy tub of water, then leaves and remains "totally oblivious" to what has happened. Leask billed it as the only scene she was shocked with upon reading the scripts. Leask said of reading it for the first time, "My mouth went open and the first thing I thought was 'Well, I'm definitely not going on Facebook'" in order to avoid angry fans. She added, "I literally was like 'Great, can I not be liked anymore?' and then I just laughed it off and I was like 'You know, there's not much more to go.'" Leask also explained that the scene was shot four times due to how heavy the book was, and that after every failed take, production had to wipe it down. Leask recalled that after it was filmed, she felt she had to leave because she had "trauma" not knowing how viewers would react to the scene. Additionally, she told Digital Spy that the script made her "mortified" and she questioned why it would be written when viewers were only just accepting the character.

=== Cancellation and return ===
After the last episode of Neighbours aired, Leask reflected on her stint as Wendy. Leask explained that she was worried with the initial backlash from viewers, but their eventual acceptance of Wendy helped her understand the character more. Leask reported that fans on Twitter were much more accepting of Wendy than fans on Facebook. Leask said that "the biggest perk of the job" was the correspondence from British fans. Leask also thanked people on Twitter for their support of her character and posted, "I'm really grateful that there are a few people who are really positive. I love that you're talking to me like a human." She also recalled thinking that she did not belong in the show. She said that being on the serial felt "magical" and that her posting of behind-the-scenes snapshots corresponded with her belief that actor-fan connection is "immensely important". Of the Hendrix storyline, Leask commented, "You could see the story played out as you hope it would in real life. We were teaching the audience that this level of bullying still goes on in high school."

Leask also said that she was "completely unaware" of the serial's impending cancellation and thought that her contract would have been rewritten. Isheev previously disclosed that more of Wendy and Andrew's children were planned to be introduced, and Leask confirmed that producers had to discard the arrival of a younger son and had to instead "settle" with Sadie as the couple's only child. Leask also explained that a "scrapped" storyline for Wendy was the developing and unravelling of her character, with writers "going to explore why she was the way she was". Leask was not aware of any "scandals" planned for her character, but said that Wendy would most likely have tried to climb the ranks to manager of The Waterhole and also joked that she had "a feeling that one of us would have had an affair!" Wendy's final storyline sees her put her house up for sale as part of the final plot of Neighbours and Leask said, "It was the essence of Erinsborough that allowed that storyline to happen", but was ultimately glad with the Rodwells' final decision to stay put.

Leask hoped that her character's presence would help "pave the way" for more Asian representation on screens, which she thought would be "cool", and said, "I hope there are more Asian and mixed race families, especially in the soap world. I don't really feel like I've seen a lot of it, but times are changing and that's coming into play. All we can do is keep going. You never know what people are looking for." Leask called the final day of filming busy and the filming of the final scene of the serial "bittersweet". She also explained that she was "100% grateful" for the role and tried to "soak up every minute" she had, which ultimately left her having no regrets "at all". However, it was reported on 18 April 2023 that the Rodwells would be returning in the serial's upcoming reboot. Her return was confirmed on the Neighbours Instagram page on 1 May.

== Storylines ==
Wendy attends the Erinsborough Police Ball with her husband, Andrew Rodwell. Andrew introduces Wendy to Leo Tanaka (Tim Kano) and she thanks him for hosting the ball at his winery. She meets Levi Canning and Amy Greenwood (Jacinta Stapleton), and accidentally mistakes their polyamorous relationship with Ned Willis (Ben Hall) for a thruple, but apologises and then praises them for making it work. The following year, Wendy spends time with Roxy Willis (Zima Anderson) at her home, where they discuss Roxy's concerns over Freya Wozniak (Pheobe Roberts). Wendy later escorts her daughter, Sadie Rodwell, out of the police station following questioning and later attends Roxy and Kyle Canning's (Chris Milligan) going away party, where she and Andrew discuss moving into Ramsay Street. They eventually buy the house and Wendy presents her neighbours with gifts, however she is not greeted kindly by Amy, whose daughter was implicated for the school fire that Sadie lit. When the Rodwells try to help Hendrix Greyson, Wendy is yelled at by Mackenzie Hargreaves, who blames Sadie for Hendrix's pulmonary fibrosis. Sadie apologises to Hendrix and the Rodwells are paid a visit by Karl (Alan Fletcher) and Susan Kennedy, who give Wendy an olive tree branch and talk to Sadie.

Sadie later expresses her dislike for her new school, so Wendy approaches Jane Harris (Annie Jones), a teacher at Erinsborough High, to ask if Sadie would be able to reenrol in Erinsborough High, but Jane tells Wendy that she is busy. Wendy befriends Estelle Petrides (Maria Mercedes), who encourages Wendy to ask Jane about Sadie's potential return to Erinsborough once more. Wendy asks Jane again and Jane tells her she will speak with principal Susan Kennedy. Wendy also befriends Estelle's daughter, Terese Willis (Rebekah Elmaloglou). When Hendrix dies, Wendy stands up for Sadie when Hendrix's grieving mum, Lisa Rowsthorn (Jane Allsop), yells at her and calls her stupid. Wendy backs up Sadie's decision to show a grieving Mackenzie footage of Hendrix practicing her wedding vowels. At Toadie Rebecchi (Ryan Moloney) and Melanie Pearson's (Lucinda Cowden) engagement party, Wendy accidentally knocks the Ramsay Street history book into a tub of icy water without noticing and the book is destroyed. Wendy hires Paige Smith (Olympia Valance) as her real estate agent when she and Andrew decide to sell their house but they later renounce the deal. They and Sadie attend Toadie and Melanie's wedding the same day and go to their reception and party.

Wendy goes for the development manager position at Lassiter's, however Cara Varga-Murphy (Sara West) receives the job. Wendy later finds Cara's son, JJ Varga-Murphy (Riley Bryant), inside their house and accuses him of stealing her watch, subsequently resulting in a confrontation between the Rodwells and Varga-Murphys on Ramsay Street. Wendy and Cara begin to hold grudges against each other as a result. When Wendy finds her watch in the washing basket, she apologises to the Varga-Murphys, but Cara kicks her out. JJ later apologises to Wendy on behalf of his mother. Out of spite, Wendy contacts the Linwell brothers, two dodgy construction workers that Cara used to work with. The Linwell brothers leave an envelope of white powder, which falls all over Remi Varga-Murphy (Naomi Rukavina). Remi warns that it may be a potential anthrax threat, so rest of the family flee the house. Wendy, feeling guilty that she contacted the Linwell brothers, runs into the house to comfort Remi. It is later revealed the powder was actually baby powder. Wendy is shocked when JJ reveals that Andrew may be his biological father and Andrew admits that he donated sperm when he and Wendy were struggling to have a second child. A DNA test reveals that he is not Andrew's son and Wendy accuses Andrew of being upset with the results.

On 16 October 2024 Wendy left to go stay with her mum and dad, it was later revealed by her daughter Sadie that Wendy is not planning on returning leaving the Rodwells marriage unknown.

== Reception ==
For her portrayal of Wendy, Leask received a nomination in the "Soaps - Best Actor" category the 2025 Digital Spy Reader Awards.

Isheev called Wendy and her family "the first piece of the puzzle on what the next phase of the show would have been." Upon Wendy's promotion to a permanent character, Digital Spy's Stephanie Chase said that Wendy and her family will "need to do some soul-searching as they question their place on Ramsay Street." Timblick also mentioned that Wendy was not welcome on the street when she first moved in. Leask explained to Kilkelly that viewers initially had a lot of "animosity" towards Wendy in her first set of appearances, something she was not expecting, but Wendy eventually proved to be popular amongst fans and Isheev described her as a "hit" going by reactions online.

Kilkelly reported that viewers found "annoying at first", but "quickly warmed to her". Kilkelly also said that Wendy had "a foot-in-mouth moment when she asked Lucy Robinson whether her grandmother would be joining them" and Laura Denby of Radio Times also commented, "Wendy Rodwell did rather spoil the moment by boldly assuming that Helen was still alive when she asked about meeting her!" Kilkelly also asked for clarification on whether Wendy was unbeknownst or not to the fact that she accidentally destroyed the Ramsay Street history book, which was labelled "a memorable Wendy scene". While showcasing spoiler photos for the Neighbours finale, Kilkelly commented, "It's a real shame that we won't get to see more stories for the Rodwells" and claimed that "There was only so much the Rodwells could do towards the end, as the returning characters and nostalgia took over the show."

In the midst of Hendrix's diagnosis storyline, Kilkelly said that "Wendy Rodwell seems to be everywhere", and further said that the "Rodwell clan earned a place in the show's history books by becoming the last ever family to move onto Ramsay Street." He also said that Wendy, Andrew and Sadie "went on to play a big role in Hendrix Greyson's emotional exit storyline." Neighbours was also praised for Wendy's casting, which helped boost east Asian and multicultural representation on Australian screens, something which Leask herself had longed for.

Whilst reviewing the Neighbours relaunch, Digital Spy further said that, "Candice Leask has cemented herself as a fan favourite in the role of Wendy Rodwell, who has featured in some wonderful scenes recently as the show has explored the vulnerabilities and insecurities that lie beneath her zany front." Stephen Patterson from Metro named Wendy a "Ramsay Street favourite". In his weekly review, Jack Ori, writing on behalf of American site TV Fanatic, pointed out that Wendy "seems to do things impulsively and then try to fix it when she realizes she screwed up".
