= List of Neighbours characters introduced in 2022 =

Neighbours is an Australian television soap opera. It was first broadcast on 18 March 1985 and airs on digital channel 10 Peach. The following is a list of characters that first appear in the show in 2022, by order of first appearance. All characters are introduced by the show's executive producer Jason Herbison. The 2022 season of Neighbours began airing from 3 January, following the first Christmas transmission break since 2018, and ran until the series concluded its initial run on 28 July 2022. Zara Selwyn was introduced in the first episode of the season, and Freya Wozniak and Sadie Rodwell made their debuts three weeks later. Kiri Durant made her first appearance in March, while Montana Marcel, Corey Smythe Jones and Harriet Wallace first appeared in April. Asher Nesmith arrived in May. Sian Caton, Alana Greyson, Estelle Petrides, and Sam Young made their debuts in June, while Byron Stone appeared in July, just before the 2022 Neighbours finale.

From 7 January until 26 July, episodes aired on Channel 5 in the UK before their Australian broadcast. Dates below refer to the Australian broadcast, unless otherwise specified.

== Zara Selwyn ==
Zara Selwyn
- Neighbours character
- Portrayed by: Freya Van Dyke
- First appearance: 3 January 2022
- Last appearance: 28 July 2022
- Introduced by: Jason Herbison
In-universe information
- Occupation: Student
- Father: Eric Selwyn
- Mother: Amy Greenwood
- Brothers: Elijah Selwyn
- Half-brothers: Jax; Kai

Zara Selwyn, played by Freya Van Dyke, made her first appearance on 3 January 2022. Van Dyke confirmed her casting via her social media, where she also expressed her excitement at joining the cast. Zara is the teenage daughter of established character Amy Greenwood (Jacinta Stapleton), who has been referred to on-screen since Amy's reintroduction in 2020, along with her two brothers. Zara's introduction was revealed in the trailer that followed the 2021 season finale in December, which shows Zara's arrival disrupting Amy's polyamorous relationship with Ned Willis (Ben Hall) and Levi Canning (Richie Morris). Amy is also heard saying that her daughter needs to be her main priority ahead of the relationship. Van Dyke last appeared on screens as Zara on the final episode of Neighbours, broadcast on 28 July 2022.

Zara walks in on her mother in bed with Ned Willis and Levi Canning, after they have just had a threesome. Amy explains that Ned and Levi slept over after an impromptu party, and Zara demands that she takes her out for breakfast. At The Flamingo Bar, Zara explains that she snuck away from home to hang out with Amy because her family does not understand what it is like to be a girl. Zara meets Amy's friend Toadie Rebecchi (Ryan Moloney) and gives her mother a Christmas present, which she hopes Amy will hand down to her. Toadie tells Zara to put Amy's alcoholic drink down after she begins drinking it. Later, Amy informs Zara that she is in a polyamorous relationship with Ned and Levi. Zara reacts badly to the news, and the following day treats Amy, Ned and Levi with increased hostility. After Amy gives her an ultimatum to get a part-time job while staying in Erinsborough, Zara reluctantly takes up Ned's offer to work at Harold's Cafe, where she meets Hendrix Greyson (Benny Turland) and learns of his past difficulties in bonding with his father and step-mother. Inspired by Hendrix's story, Zara begins to pursue Levi in an attempt to end her mother's relationships. Zara asks Amy to break up with her boyfriends, so they can enjoy time together, but believes Amy has lied to her when she witnesses her hugging Ned and Levi goodbye. Zara then invites herself into Levi's spa, and accuses him of sexual assault in front of Amy. However, when Amy insists on going to the police if her accusation is genuine, Zara admits it is untrue. Zara apologises to Amy and Levi in a bid to avoid repercussions. While Amy is willing to move on, Levi is unable to and breaks up with Amy.

Meanwhile, Zara is angered by Toadie objecting to her self-entitled behaviour at his house, and spikes the non-alcoholic jelly shots intended for Roxy Willis' (Zima Anderson) hen's party with vodka, one of which is eaten by Toadie's daughter, Nell (Scarlett Anderson). Zara again evades any meaningful punishment by asking to move in with Amy permanently. Zara attends her first day at Erinsborough High, where principal Susan Kennedy (Jackie Woodburne) and teacher Jane Harris (Annie Jones) tell Zara not to alter her uniform in future. Jane introduces Zara to fellow students Sadie Rodwell (Emerald Chan) and Aubrey Laing (Etoile Little), who soon ditch her. Zara is later disappointed to learn that her mother has purchased a food truck and, in anger, Zara sets off the school's fire alarms in front of Jane. Hendrix tells her to pull her head in, before she returns and floods the school toilets. Zara admits to Amy that she tried to get kicked out of school to spend more time with her, so Amy offers her a job at her food truck. However, the two argue again when Susan phones Amy and tells her about the flooding incident, resulting in Zara pushing Amy and walking off, unaware that Amy's broken ribs have punctured her lung.

== Freya Wozniak ==
Freya Wozniak
- Neighbours character
- Portrayed by: Phoebe Roberts
- First appearance: 25 January 2022
- Last appearance: 28 July 2022
- Introduced by: Jason Herbison
In-universe information
- Occupation: Nurse
- Brothers: Zane Wozniak

Freya Wozniak, played by Phoebe Roberts, made her first appearance on 25 January 2022 in Australia and on 20 January in the UK. The character and Roberts' casting was announced via the show's social media accounts on 30 October 2021. She began filming her first scenes the previous week, and is the first new addition to the serial's regular cast since Nicolette Stone (Charlotte Chimes) in July 2020. Roberts expressed her delight about joining the cast, saying "Neighbours is such a huge part of the Australian film and TV industry, it's very exciting to be involved in something so iconic that is also so loved in the UK. As a kid, I tuned in to watch all the drama of Erinsborough unfold, it's surreal to now be a part of that drama!" Roberts' casting occurred shortly after she appeared in Lie With Me, created by Neighbours executive producer Jason Herbison. He stated that the scriptwriters had "created a fascinating character for her that is complex, mysterious and a risk taker, she's going to be a lot of fun and Phoebe has already nailed the role." Her character was also billed as "the ultimate mystery girl" and someone who will "bend the rules" if necessary. Susannah Alexander of Digital Spy observed that while Freya does not share a surname with any of the current characters, there was still a possibility that she has a connection to them or a past character. In a promotional trailer for the show's 2022 episodes, Freya is shown to be a potential love interest for Levi Canning (Richie Morris). Levi first encounters Freya in the aftermath of a fatal weather event at The Flamingo Bar. Freya's last appearance is on 28 July 2022 during the serial's finale.

Levi Canning encounters Freya breaching the security tape around the wreckage of The Flamingo Bar, which is the site of a police investigation following the storm that resulted in the death of Britney Barnes (Montana Cox). Freya removes a scarf from the bar, and Levi pursues her and demands its return. Freya insists the scarf is hers, but refuses to provide her details for it to be returned. Later, she asks Nicolette Stone about Britney before Sheila Canning (Colette Mann) tells her more about Levi. After leaving Sheila and Levi, she looks at a picture of an unknown man on her phone. Sheila sets Freya and Levi up on a date and they go Baker's Hill Winery. During their date, Freya asks to see photos from Levi's cousin's wedding and she notices Ned Willis (Ben Hall) wearing the scarf she picked up. Freya asks Ned if the scarf is his and he explains he picked it up while drunk. Freya then proceeds to ask Ned if he knows the unknown man in the photo, who she says is her cousin.

== Sadie Rodwell ==
Sadie Rodwell
- Neighbours character
- Portrayed by: Emerald Chan
- Duration: 2022–2025
- First appearance: 27 January 2022
- Last appearance: 11 December 2025
- Introduced by: Jason Herbison
In-universe information
- Occupation: Student; Lassiters day spa operator
- Father: Andrew Rodwell
- Mother: Wendy Rodwell
- Uncles: Felix Rodwell
- First cousins: JJ Varga-Murphy

Sadie Rodwell, played by Emerald Chan, made her first appearance on 27 January 2022. Chan's casting details were announced on 18 January 2022. Sadie is introduced alongside mean girl Aubrey Laing (Etoile Little) in a storyline that sees Zara Selwyn (Freya Van Dyke) being bullied at school. Sadie is the daughter of the preintroduced Andrew Rodwell (David Lamb; Lloyd Will) and Wendy Rodwell (Candice Leask). Neighbours executive producer, Jason Herbison, teased, "We also have a new family moving into the street." This led to fan speculation that Sadie, Andrew and Wendy could be promoted to regular characters and it was later revealed on screen that they would be moving into 26 Ramsay Street. In an interview, Chan revealed that she was unaware of Sadie's connection to Andrew and Wendy until the end of her first storyline. Chan was later added to the opening titles. Script producer Shane Isheev revealed that Sadie was planned to have siblings, however the serial's cancellation prevented them from being introduced. Sadie appears in the finale episode of Neighbours on 28 July 2022, and returned when the series recommenced in 2023.

At Erinsborough High, Sadie is introduced to Zara Selwyn by teacher Jane Harris (Annie Jones) on her first day, along with her best friend, Aubrey Laing. Sadie and Aubrey quickly ditch Zara, but add her on social media after she sets off the school's fire alarm. They later ask her to join them for coffee and apologise for ditching her. Sadie and Aubrey pick up Zara from her house and notice that she lives near Hendrix Greyson (Ben Turland), who they both have crushes on. Zara tells them they work together and are friends, and Sadie and Aubrey are surprised when Zara later convinces Hendrix to play frisbee with them. After watching Jane scold Zara for not handing in her homework, Sadie and Aubrey pull a prank on Jane, which Zara gets the blame for. Zara continuously tells Sadie and Aubrey that Hendrix is into her, but they doubt her story as he has a girlfriend, so they ask her to prove it. She sends them photos of a text seemingly from Hendrix declaring his love and an engraved pendent he gave her. The following day, the girls tell Zara that a bin was set on fire at the school and they ask Zara if she did it, but she tells them she was not even on school grounds. Zara wonders if Sadie and Aubrey started the fire to get back at Jane again, but they deny it. Zara learns that Sadie has been given her old job at the café and that she and Aubrey know about the fire outside Jane's house. Zara apologises for accusing them of starting the bin fire, which they accept.

When Sadie and Aubrey see Hendrix leaving Zara's house, and learn she is not moving back to Cairns, they send his girlfriend Mackenzie Hargreaves (Georgie Stone) the link to their private group chat about him. When Zara confronts them and discloses that she will be sent back to Cairns now, Sadie is relieved that their plan to start another fire in the school will not have to go ahead; Aubrey, however, insists on continuing. Sadie feels guilty after the fire spreads and Mackenzie is trapped inside, with Zara taking the blame. After rescuing Mackenzie, Hendrix questions Sadie about Zara and the fire, but they are interrupted by Aubrey. He later overhears them talking and eventually Sadie admits that Aubrey started the fire and made her go along with it. Sadie goes to the police to confess and later apologises to Zara when they come face to face. Two months later, Sadie moves into Ramsay Street with her parents, but is nervous about encountering Zara and Hendrix again. Although Zara makes peace with her, they both learn that Hendrix requires a lung transplant following the events of the fire. Sadie is determined to move away again, but the family cannot afford to. Susan (Jackie Woodburne) and Karl Kennedy (Alan Fletcher) visit the family to help manage the situation, but tell Sadie that Hendrix is not yet ready to hear her apology. However, after overhearing her talking to Wendy, Hendrix encourages her to stop blaming herself for his health difficulties. Sadie and her family are invited to Hendrix's wedding, but Sadie begins to feel heavy guilt when Hendrix dies a few days later from his lung transplant surgery complications. To try and do some right, Sadie and Zara go to a shack where Corey Smythe-Jones (Laurence Boxhall) is hiding out. Corey knocks Sadie unconscious and kidnaps Zara, before Andrew and Levi Canning (Richie Morris) find Sadie and take her to hospital, where she recovers. Sadie and her family attend Toadie Rebecchi (Ryan Moloney) and Melanie Pearson's (Lucinda Cowden) wedding a few days later, then follow their neighbours back to Ramsay Street for the wedding reception.

Sadie forms a friendship group with Mackenzie and Holly Hoyland (Lucinda Armstrong Hall). She is shown to be working as a nanny for Leo Tanaka (Tim Kano), looking after his daughter Abigail Tanaka (Nikita Kato). Sadie becomes annoyed with Wendy's insistence she goes to university. Sadie reveals she wants to become a make-up artist instead of studying. She and Wendy clash, but Wendy later realises she reflecting her own regrets about not attending university onto Sadie and enrols herself. Paul Robinson (Stefan Dennis) asks Sadie to spy on Leo and his girlfriend Krista Sinclair (Majella Davis) in exchange for paying her make-up course fees which she accepts. Sadie witnesses Paul and Eden Shaw (Costa D'Angelo) together. After Paul's son, is killed following an altercation with Eden. Sadie realises that Paul told Eden of Krista's whereabouts which inadvertently caused David's death. Sadie is conflicted about telling the truth but exposes Paul's involvement during an argument with Krista. Sadie reveals she has not yet lost her virginity and Holly suggests she ask their friend, Byron Stone (Xavier Molyneux). Sadie later decides against the idea and begins to spend time with Byron. At a party, the two spend time together and later have sex. Holly tells Byron about the idea and feels used due to his past as a male escort. Sadie explains that she has genuine feelings for him and they begin to date. Sadie requests that they do not tell her parents because they often meddle in her personal life. Bryon arranges a fancy dress themed date at his home. Sadie and Bryon become passionate on the sofa and Andrew walks in on them.

== Kiri Durant ==
Kiri Durant
- Neighbours character
- Portrayed by: Gemma Bird Matheson
- Duration: 2022, 2024–2025
- First appearance: 24 March 2022
- Last appearance: 11 December 2025
- Introduced by: Jason Herbison
In-universe information
- Occupation: Manager of River Bend Getaway; Events manager
- Family: Robinson
- Father: Glen Donnelly
- Mother: Barbara Durant
- Stepfather: Alan Durant
- Uncles: Paul Robinson
- Aunts: Lucy Robinson
- First cousins: David Tanaka; Leo Tanaka
- Other relatives: Harlow Robinson

Kiri Hua Durant, played by Gemma Bird Matheson, made her first appearance on 24 March 2022 in Australia and on 9 March 2022 in the UK. The character and Matheson's introduction to the regular cast were announced on 7 February 2022. Matheson previously appeared in the show in 2016 as Carla Watson. She stated that she was "honoured" to join the show, adding that she was "excited by what this representation would mean for a lot of people, especially on such a mainstream show. I'm a big advocate for queer people playing queer roles. I'm excited about this representation for several reasons – I get to play myself, a queer Papua New Guinean Christian. That's pretty monumental." Kiri was billed as being "mysterious and flirty", "very morally-driven", but also "a good girl at heart". Matheson stated that her character would end up "in the middle of a lot of drama." Kiri is a love interest for Nicolette Stone (Charlotte Chimes), who meets her during a holiday to River Bend. Nicolette is "enamoured with the charming Kiri" and the pair share a kiss as they get to know one another. It was later confirmed that Kiri is Glen Donnelly's (Richard Huggett) long-lost daughter. Chloe Brennan (April Rose Pengilly) also becomes her second love interest as she moves onto Ramsay Street. Kiri also appeared in the serial's then-final episode on 28 July 2022.

On 4 June 2024, it was announced that Matheson had reprised the role of Kiri. A Neighbours publicist stated via the brand's social media accounts that Kiri's return would "cause a stir when she visits her friends and family on Ramsay Street." They also questioned how her return would affect Nicolette. Matheson reprised the role once again in 2025, for the show's final episodes.

Kiri welcomes competition winner Glen Donnelly and his group of friends to the River Bend Getaway. She shows them their accommodation and invites them to give up their phones. Kiri flirts with Nicolette Stone, who reciprocates. She tells her that her parents own River Bend, but they moved up the coast and left her in charge. The following day, Kiri and Nicolette share a kiss which is interrupted by Glen. Kiri asks Glen if he has been to River Bend before as he looks familiar, and he tells her that he has been in the area before. Kiri overhears Harlow Robinson (Jemma Donovan) talking about someone named Isla and Nicolette admits that she has a daughter. She later visits Kiri's room to explain that she just wanted to be someone else for a few days. Kiri accepts her explanation and tells Nicolette that she has been thinking about her all afternoon. They spend the night together. In the morning, Kiri arranges a hike with Nicolette and Glen, but Ned Willis (Ben Hall) and Harlow return to tell them they heard gun shots nearby. Kiri presumes it is rabbit hunters, so she tells her employee Bobby Long (Ben Crundwell) to go with Nicolette to get the minibus and call the police from the office, while she and Glen look for Freya Wozniak (Phoebe Roberts) and Levi Canning (Richie Morris). They come across a motorbike in the bush and return to the base, where Nicolette tells them the minibus was gone and Bobby has gone to call the police. All members of the group are eventually found and return home. Kiri later turns up on Glen's doorstep and tells him that she has been worried about everyone and wanted to check in. She also tells him that she has come to see Nicolette, and Glen encourages her to go for it. Kiri asks Nicolette and asks her out on a date. Over lunch, Kiri explains that her parents have decided to sell River Bend and she is thinking of a change too. Glen later tells Kiri that if she is planning on staying in Erinsborough for Nicolette, then she needs to know that Nicolette is a user and a liar. Kiri then confronts Nicolette about giving Aaron Brennan (Matt Wilson) and David Tanaka (Takaya Honda) someone else's baby. She points out that it is not the first thing Nicolette has kept from her and that she is not about drama. The following day, Glen invites both Kiri and Nicolette to lunch for a chance to clear the air between them. When he admits to Nicolette that he told Kiri about her past, she pushes him into a pool. Kiri is shocked by her reaction and leaves. She checks on Glen and he says he should have kept out of it, but she thanks him for looking out for her.

A week later, Kiri turns up at the vineyard where Glen works having been hired by Leo Tanaka (Tim Kano) as the new events manager. She befriends Chloe Brennan, who helps show her around the vineyard, and later joins her and her housemates, Freya and Mackenzie Hargreaves (Georgie Stone) for drinks. Chloe then invites Kiri to move in with them, but Kiri soon learns that she will be living on the same street as Nicolette, who used to date Chloe. Kiri visits the house and Chloe explains her part in the baby-swap and points out some of Nicolette's good qualities. Kiri admits that she likes everyone and the room, so she agrees to move in. She also arranges to carpool to the vineyard with Glen. During a trip to the beach with some of the other Ramsay Street residents, Kiri reassures Nicolette that things are good between and she wants to be friends. She later tells Glen that she has feelings for Chloe, but it is awkward as they now live together. When she notices Chloe is stressed due to work, Kiri teaches her some meditation techniques and they nearly kiss. They acknowledge there is something between them, but agree to just be friends so things do not become awkward in the house. Nicolette gets suspicious of Glen's attachment to Kiri, so she teams up with Paul Robinson (Stefan Dennis) and speaks to Karen Constantine (Amanda LaBonte). Through John Wong (Harry Tseng), Paul discovers that Kiri is Glen's daughter and reveals the news to her in front of Glen. Kiri speaks to her mother, Barbara Durant (Wendy Mocke), who admits that it is true, before Kiri tells Glen she wants nothing to do with him. Kiri later finds out that Terese Willis (Rebekah Elmaloglou) has accidentally informed Alan Durant, who is actually not Kiri's biological father, which Kiri believed he was. Kiri returned in the final episode touring Ramsey Hills with other former and current residents.

== Montana Marcel ==
Montana Marcel
- Neighbours character
- Portrayed by: Tammin Sursok
- First appearance: 13 April 2022
- Last appearance: 1 June 2022
- Introduced by: Jason Herbison
In-universe information
- Occupation: Fashion designer

Montana Marcel, played by Tammin Sursok, made her first appearance on 13 April 2022 in Australia and on 24 March 2022 in the UK. Sursok's casting was announced on 17 January 2022, but details of her character were not immediately revealed. Sursok secured the role after returning to Australia with her family. She admitted that she had previously told herself that she would not return to soap operas, following her stint in Home and Away as Dani Sutherland, saying "You know, I always said I'd never come back into soaps. It's not because I don't love it or it wasn't a great experience. It's because I felt like this chapter of my life was over." Sursok's guest appearance coincided with the announcement that Neighbours would be ending that year, and she praised the cast and crew for their positive attitudes on set. It was later announced that Sursok would be playing Montana Marcel, a fashion designer and businesswoman, who, along with her assistant Mick Allsop (Joel Creasey), takes out a tender from Lassiters Hotel for her Fashion Week. After hotel manager Terese Willis (Rebekah Elmaloglou) and Chloe Brennan (April Rose Pengilly) fail to impress Montana with their pitch, they ask Leo Tanaka (Tim Kano) to help save the Fashion Week tender and it soon becomes clear Montana "has taken a liking to him."

Montana visits Lassiters Hotel with her assistant Mick Allsop to hear Terese Willis and Chloe Brennan's pitch for her Fashion Week event. She is unimpressed by the complex and notes the tiki torches, before going to The Waterhole, where she asks Terese about the storm which led to the closure of the Flamingo Bar. Chloe says that Lassiters was not at fault for that, while Terese mentions the other high-profile events Lassiters has hosted. Montana then notices the gladioli flowers on the tables and says she is no longer hungry. The group visit Leo Tanaka's winery, where Terese and Chloe are hoping to host the fashion parade. Montana appears bored until she meets Leo. She eventually asks Terese and Chloe why she is being tortured with tiki torches, gladioli and ice sculptures. When Chloe explains that they thought everything reminded her of the things she loved, Montana says that they just remind her of being jilted by her fiancé at their wedding in Hawaii. Montana tells them she has seen enough, despite not hearing Terese's pitch, but Leo convinces her to stay and take a tour of the vineyard with him. Although she enjoys the tour with Leo, Montana tells Terese and Chloe that she is not interested in collaborating with Lassiters. Leo visits Montana at her home to ask for a second chance for Lassiters, but she admits she has concerns about the bad publicity the hotel has received. Leo says that her Fashion Week could be good for his business too. They talk about their time in New York and Leo's daughter, until Mick interrupts. Montana tells him to leave and lets him know she is aware that he sabotaged the Lassiters pitch. Montana offers to give Terese the tender if Leo has sex with her. He admits that he finds her attractive, but asks to think about it. Montana later awards the tender to Lassiters and she and Leo have sex again, after which he tries to talk her around to some of Chloe and Terese's ideas. She lets them know she is onto their plan to use Leo as their bargaining chip and that it will not work.

In 2023, Sarah Ellis from Inside Soap compared Montana to Hollyoaks character Rayne Royce, although she commented that Rayne was more "vain" and "more of a pain" than Montana.

== Corey Smythe-Jones ==
Corey Smythe-Jones
- Neighbours character
- Portrayed by: Laurence Boxhall
- First appearance: 18 April 2022
- Last appearance: 6 July 2022
- Introduced by: Jason Herbison
In-universe information
- Father: Michael

Corey Smythe-Jones, played by Laurence Boxhall, made his first appearance on 18 April 2022 in Australia and 28 March 2022 in the UK. Boxhall's casting was announced on 21 March 2022 by Jess Lee of Digital Spy. Corey is introduced as a potential love interest for Harlow Robinson (Jemma Donovan). Corey and Harlow meet during a storyline set and filmed in the UK. Corey was initially billed as a "charismatic stranger." Following fan theories, Neighbours confirmed that Corey was the show's latest villain, who is attempting to recruit Harlow into The Restoration Order, a cult that Harlow's late mother, Prue Wallace (Denise van Outen), was a member of. Daniel Kilkelly of Digital Spy described Corey as acting "cunningly" and having "sinister intentions."

Corey helps fellow Everleigh Hotel guest Harlow Robinson with her luggage. Corey learns she is visiting from Australia and he asks her if she wants to join him for breakfast, but Harlow turns him down as she has to meet someone. Corey later meets Harlow at the hotel bar and learns she had a bad day, so he buys her a drink and they swap stories. Harlow meets with Corey the following afternoon to discuss her mother's diary, which is of interest to a cult that ruined the relationship between Harlow and her mother. Corey suggests Harlow burns the diary, but later apologises for making a radical proposal, however, Harlow thinks that it makes sense. When Corey asks if The Order will try to get the diary again, Harlow decides to go through with burning it. Corey fetches some matches and suggests they could find another way to keep the diary from The Order, but Harlow tells him that she has saved her favourite pages and then sets the diary on fire. Later that day, Corey and Harlow catch up and she tells him that things went well with her aunt. Corey asks Harlow whether something romantic might have happened between if she was not returning to Australia so soon. Harlow tells him that if circumstance were different, but she has some things to sort out back home first and it would be unfair to start something. Corey says that he has enjoyed the last few days with her.

Shortly after Harlow returns to Australia, Corey turns up in Erinsborough to surprise Harlow, after coming over for business. He meets Ned Willis (Ben Hall), Harlow's other love interest, and the rest of her family, before being invited to a farewell party for Roxy Willis (Zima Anderson) and Kyle Canning (Chris Milligan), where Harlow kisses him. They later attend a promotional event at Lassiters and a neighbourhood party together. Ned's girlfriend, Amy Greenwood (Jacinta Stapleton), asks if they would be her models for the upcoming Fashion Week and Corey agrees straight away. He later finds Harlow outside and she tells him that Amy and Ned are thinking of having a child together. Corey realises that there is something between her and Ned, but Harlow explains that there was something briefly and she apologises for lying to him. She says she likes him, but her feelings for Ned have not gone away yet. Corey accepts this and tells her they can take their relationship at her pace, but Harlow later says that she cannot be with him. Corey calls Christabel Bancroft (Syd Zygier) to tell her that Harlow broke up with him and that they need to figure out a new plan. He meets with Christabel, who tells him to exploit Harlow's vulnerability to bring her into The Order. He later hands over a USB stick owned by Harlow's mother, the key to which he retrieved from the burnt diary. He also tells her about a plan to play hero after revealing Harlow's affair with Ned.

== Harriet Wallace ==
Harriet Wallace
- Neighbours character
- Portrayed by: Amanda Holden
- First appearance: 18 April 2022
- Last appearance: 20 April 2022
- Introduced by: Jason Herbison
In-universe information
- Sisters: Prudence Wallace
- Nieces: Harlow Robinson

Harriet Wallace, played by Amanda Holden, made her first appearance on 18 April 2022 in Australia and on 28 March 2022 in the UK. The character and Holden's casting details were announced on 7 October 2021. Holden appears in scenes set in London, alongside Jemma Donovan. She began filming in the city during the week commencing 11 October 2021. Reacting to her casting, Holden said that she grew up watching Neighbours and stated "To now have the opportunity to be a part of such an iconic Australian show is simply fabulous. I can't wait to work with Jemma in London. This feels like a joyous occasion for everyone." Holden's character is Harlow Robinson's (Donovan) aunt and Prue Wallace's (Denise van Outen) sister. The show's executive producer, Jason Herbison, said Harriet and Harlow would be reunited as part of a big storyline in which they "solve a family mystery relating to Prue." Donovan added that she was looking forward to creating a relationship between the two characters.

Harriet meets her niece, Harlow Robinson at the South Bank and thinks she seems sad or heartbroken, but Harlow puts it down to jet lag. Harriet then tells Harlow that she has cleared her work schedule for the week, and Harlow produces her mother's diary, which she and Harriet plan to relive. After seeing some London sights, Harlow confides in Harriet about her fling with Ned Willis (Ben Hall), but quickly changes the subject back to Harriet, who apologises for not having her stay as she is renovating. They read events from Prue's diary and Harlow tells her about a stranger she met at her hotel. Harriet realises the diary is missing and they split up to try and find it. They are unsuccessful and make plans to meet up in the morning, as Harlow is tired. The following day, Harriet sees Harlow on her street and hurries away from her, but she drops her handbag as Harlow catches up to her and Prue's diary falls out. She explains that she hid the diary and then went back for it, after Harlow left. A woman from The Restoration Order, a cult Prue was involved in, offered Harriet £10,000 for the diary and she needs the money because she has lost her job and her partner has left her. She gives the diary back to Harlow, who later tells her that she has burnt the diary. Harriet cannot believe she was so desperate, but explains that when her life came crashing down, she felt that she lost herself and was unable to admit that she could no longer handle everything. Harlow then produces a bottle of wine and some cups, and Harriet ponders a move to Australia, but realises she needs to fix things at home first. Harlow offers her some money, but Harriet refuses and says she will be fine.

== Asher Nesmith ==
Asher Nesmith
- Neighbours character
- Portrayed by: Kathleen Ebbs
- First appearance: 10 May 2022
- Last appearance: 29 June 2022
- Introduced by: Jason Herbison
In-universe information
- Sons: 1

Asher Nesmith, played by Kathleen Ebbs, made their first appearance on 10 May 2022 in Australia and on 14 April 2022 in the UK. Asher is the first non-binary character to appear in Neighbours. Before their first episode aired in Australia, Ebbs confirmed their casting and wrote about how much the part meant to them, saying "As someone who grew up watching this iconic soap, it was an honour to not only be a part of this amazing cast, but to be that representation I so desperately needed as kid. I hope I've done my community proud and you enjoy Asher as much as I enjoyed playing them. Here for a good time, not a long time!" Ebbs found the cast and crew were open to feedback about how Asher should be portrayed and gave them "flexibility" to change things, like Asher's outfits to make them feel comfortable. Ebbs found their time on set to be a "positive experience", as well as a "euphoric experience" as they were the first non-binary person on the show. Iona Rowan of Digital Spy speculated that Asher might end up working at the local café, after an official photograph featuring Ebbs on the set was released by the show. At the end of May, it was confirmed Asher would become a love interest for Nicolette Stone (Charlotte Chimes).

Asher visits The Waterhole and comments on the clothing brand that Nicolette Stone's daughter is wearing. After Nicolette leaves to change a nappy, her mother Jane Harris (Annie Jones) notices a rainbow patch on Asher's bag and asks if it means gay pride or if it is just a rainbow. She then explains that Nicolette is a lesbian and she is a teacher who is always learning from her students. Asher tells her that they are queer and non-binary. Jane later tells Nicolette that Asher is single and has a young son. Weeks later, Jane invites Asher to be Nicolette's date at Hendrix Greyson (Ben Turland) and Mackenzie Hargreaves' (Georgie Stone) wedding reception. Asher says they would never have agreed to come if they did not think Nicolette was in on it, but they both admit Jane can be very persuasive. Asher and Nicolette party with Chloe Brennan (April Rose Pengilly) and Kiri Durant (Gemma Bird Matheson), before Asher initiates a kiss with Nicolette on the dancefloor. Nicolette invites Asher to a local queer bar for their second date, but Asher texts to say that her babysitter has let them down, leaving Nicolette alone with Jane. Asher eventually turns up and is surprised to see Nicolette still at the bar, as they assumed she would have left. Asher tells Nicolette that as the babysitter turned up, they thought they would go out anyway. Asher invites Nicolette to play a game of pool, but Nicolette does not want them to see her competitive side, so Asher decides to ask Jane, who tells them about a new friend she has met. Both Asher and Nicolette realise that Jane's friend fancies her. Asher visits Nicolette at work the following day to ask her to lunch, but they realise Nicolette is making excuses not to go and Nicolette eventually tells them that she not interested in dating them and Asher leaves.

== Sian Caton ==
Sian Caton
- Neighbours character
- Portrayed by: Esther Anderson
- First appearance: 6 June 2022
- Last appearance: 1 July 2022
- Introduced by: Jason Herbison
In-universe information
- Occupation: Doctor

Sian Caton, played by Esther Anderson, made her first appearance on 6 June 2022 in Australia and on 5 May 2022 in the UK. Anderson announced her casting on 9 March 2022 with a social media post stating "Thanks for the warm welcome @neighbours. Happy I get to play a little part in this iconic show!!" Details about her guest role were released on 24 April. Dr Sian Caton is introduced as part of a major storyline for Hendrix Greyson (Benny Turland), who visits Erinsborough Hospital as a precaution after suffering from a coughing fit. However, Dr Caton informs him that he has a life-threatening lung condition called pulmonary fibrosis and needs to undergo a lung transplant.

Hendrix Greyson books an appointment at Erinsborough Hospital for a check-up, after suffering several coughing fits. Dr Caton calls Hendrix to tell him that his test results have come through, and she informs him that he has sarcoidosis, an autoimmune disease. She shows Hendrix x-rays of his lungs and where the disease is affecting them. Dr Caton explains that sarcoidosis is usually treatable, but it has developed into pulmonary fibrosis. Hendrix asks what treatment there is for it, but Dr Caton says there is no medication for pulmonary fibrosis and Hendrix's only option is a lung transplant. Weeks later, Dr Caton carries out Hendrix's lung transplant and the surgery goes well. However, shortly after Hendrix comes around, he starts coughing and struggling to breathe. Dr Caton checks him over and then tells her colleague Karl Kennedy (Alan Fletcher) that Hendrix's body is rejecting the new lungs. He suggests that he informs the family and Dr Caton agrees that it would be easier coming from someone they know. Dr Caton tells them that Karl will explain what is going on, and that Hendrix has asked for his wife Mackenzie Hargreaves (Georgie Stone) to be with him. Dr Caton explains to Mackenzie that Hendrix is suffering from hyperacute rejection and that the anti-rejection drugs are not working due to Hendrix's antibodies overriding them. She then tells them that the new lungs have suffered irreparable damage and Hendrix only has a few hours. She later asks if Hendrix or Mackenzie have any questions, and then says that they will make sure Hendrix is comfortable. Hendrix tells her that he does not want to be sedated as he wants to make the most of the time he has left.

== Alana Greyson ==
Alana Greyson
- Neighbours character
- Portrayed by: Molly Broadstock
- First appearance: 16 June 2022
- Last appearance: 7 July 2022
- Introduced by: Jason Herbison
In-universe information
- Father: Pierce Greyson
- Mother: Lisa Rowsthorn
- Brothers: Hendrix Greyson
- Half-sisters: Maeve Rowsthorn

Alana Greyson, played by Molly Broadstock, made her first appearance on 16 June 2022 in Australia and 20 May in the UK. Daniel Kilkelly of Digital Spy confirmed Broadstock's casting on 10 May 2022. Alana is the younger sister of Hendrix Greyson (Ben Turland), and the daughter of Pierce Greyson (Tim Robards) and Lisa Rowsthorn (Jane Allsop). The character has been previously mentioned on-screen since Hendrix's arrival in 2019, and will be introduced after Hendrix is diagnosed with pulmonary fibrosis. She makes her debut in a special episode written by the show's executive producer Jason Herbison, which is set and filmed entirely in Sydney, and focuses entirely on Hendrix's storyline. In the episode, Hendrix reveals his illness to his family after Alana notices his unusual behaviour. Of the siblings' relationship, Turland told Kilkelly, "Molly has been great. Finding the love between a brother and sister has been really fun to explore. We'll see how Hendrix acts as a big brother. He feels quite guilty that he hasn't been there for his sister. It's been really good and Molly is great. We connected and established this sibling relationship, especially as we see the two characters in their homes in Sydney."

Alana finds her brother Hendrix and his girlfriend Mackenzie Hargreaves (Georgie Stone) in central Sydney, after tracking them through his social media posts. The group then visit Alana and Hendrix's father Pierce Greyson (Tim Robards) at his home for lunch. Hendrix starts to feel ill, but he blames it on their early start, although Alana is suspicious. She later goes through Hendrix's belongings and finds information about pulmonary fibrosis, which she shares with their parents. She tells Hendrix that she was worried about him. Hendrix then tells his family that he has an autoimmune disease that developed into pulmonary fibrosis, after he rescued Mackenzie from a fire. Alana asks him what happened during lunch and Hendrix tells them his medication makes him queasy. Alana blames Mackenzie for Hendrix's condition and he orders her to apologise, saying it is no one's fault. The following morning, Hendrix and Mackenzie announce that they are engaged, but Alana runs off instead of congratulating them. Hendrix finds her and asks if it is because she does not like Mackenzie, but Alana says no. Hendrix reassures her that although he is flying back to Erinsborough, he is not going anywhere yet. Alana then makes a joke about Mackenzie being way out of his league and the pair hug. Alana apologises to Mackenzie, who accepts and explains that she has also let her anger get the better of her. Before they leave, Hendrix tells Alana to visit soon. Alana attends their wedding and is devastated when Hendrix's operation results in his death a few days later. She says her goodbyes at his funeral.

== Estelle Petrides ==
Estelle Petrides
- Neighbours character
- Portrayed by: Maria Mercedes
- First appearance: 21 June 2022
- Last appearance: 5 July 2022
- Introduced by: Jason Herbison
In-universe information
- Sons: Nick Petrides
- Daughters: Terese Willis

Estelle Petrides, played by Maria Mercedes, made her first appearance on 21 June 2022 in Australia and 27 May in the UK. The character and Mercedes' casting was announced on 15 May 2022. Mercedes previously appeared in the serial as Lucia Cammeniti. Estelle is Terese Willis' (Rebekah Elmaloglou) estranged mother, and her introduction helps further exploration of Terese's fictional backstory. Estelle initially claims she has come to support her daughter through her divorce from Paul Robinson (Stefan Dennis), but Terese soon learns from her brother Nick Petrides (Damien Fotiou) that Estelle is homeless. Terese decides she wants to repair her relationship with her mother, but struggles to trust her. Elmaloglou confirmed that producers had planned to introduce Terese's mother for years and that her behaviour would help viewers understand why Terese has become "so hard." Elmaloglou described Estelle as "one of those flamboyant, outrageous types who can't help herself". She told Jonathon Hughes of Inside Soap that Terese and Estelle became estranged after Estelle flirted with Terese's former husband Brad Willis (Kip Gamblin). As it was not the first time Estelle had made advances towards Terese's partners, she ordered her to stay away. Elmaloglou compared the pair to Eddie and Saffy from Absolutely Fabulous, as their mother-daughter roles are reversed. She thought Estelle had never grown up.

Estelle has a drink in The Waterhole and befriends Wendy Rodwell (Candice Leask), then encourages her to speak up for what she stands for. Estelle then surprises her daughter, Terese Willis, at her house. Estelle moves in and explains to Terese that she wishes to mend their relationship. Terese questions why Estelle was not there to support her during tough times in the past and Estelle explains that she lived up to her promise of staying away. Estelle continuously calls Terese "agapi mou" (Greek: αγάπη μου, meaning "my love"), despite Terese's discomfort with the phrase. Terese discovers that Estelle has become homeless following her break-up with her boyfriend, and Estelle later has drinks with Terese's husband, Paul Robinson, who Terese is divorcing. When Estelle is caught with Paul once more, she explains to Terese that she was trying to find more information on their divorce settlements. Later, Estelle and Terese bond over Josh Willis (Harley Bonner), before they vow to mend their relationship and avoid Paul. However, Estelle eventually meets up with Paul once more in his penthouse. Paul's brother and Terese's partner, Glen Donnelly (Richard Huggett), pretends Terese has made an investment, which Estelle immediately tells Paul about. Terese then kicks Estelle out of her house and Paul offers her a room at Lassiters, so Estelle kisses Paul to his surprise. Estelle looks at Paul's business files and is caught, then is kicked out of the hotel. She then asks for Terese's forgiveness and pledges to find a job and live with Terese long-term. Terese accepts, but soon discovers that she is wearing a bracelet Paul gave her, so kicks her out again. Estelle later runs off from The 82 without paying for her coffee, however Glen pays for it and talks with Estelle, then allows her to stay in a spare room at Baker's Hill Winery, where she drinks the wine and discovers Glen's drug addiction. Estelle threatens to expose Glen's addiction if he does not help her get back on Terese's good side. Glen convinces Terese to talk to Estelle and they sort out their differences, then Estelle moves back into Terese's home. When Glen tells Terese the truth about his addiction and Estelle's blackmail, Terese gives Estelle a large amount of money and makes her choose between the money and her. Estelle chooses the money and tells Terese it will be life-changing for her. She suggests in the future they can reconcile again, but Terese tells her that is not the way it will work. Estelle says goodbye to her daughter and leaves.

== Sam Young ==
Sam Young
- Neighbours character
- Portrayed by: Henrietta Graham
- Duration: 2022–2025
- First appearance: 29 June 2022
- Last appearance: 24 November 2025
- Introduced by: Jason Herbison
In-universe information
- Occupation: Executive assistant at Lassiters Hotel
- Father: Mike Young
- Mother: Rose Young

Sam Young, played by Henrietta Graham, made her first appearance on 29 June 2022 in Australia and 9 June 2022 in the UK. The character and Graham's casting was announced on 11 May 2022 via the show's social media, and later confirmed by Rianne Hougton of Digital Spy. Graham's casting came about after she stated that she wanted to appear in Neighbours during an interview with The Age in December 2021. The interview was seen by Fremantle publicist Kelly Davis, who then showed it to show producer Andrew Thompson and they invited Graham to the set. She then auditioned for the role and was cast in April 2022, making her one of the last characters to be introduced before production wrapped in June. Of her casting, Graham commented "I can't believe I'm in my favourite show." She expressed her delight at securing the role and getting to work with her favourite actors.

Thompson said casting Graham, who has Down syndrome, was "an opportunity to promote inclusivity on screen". He also revealed that her role would not be a one-off guest part and would become part of the "community". Sam is Chloe Brennan's (April Rose Pengilly) new assistant at Lassiters Hotel. Her arrival occurs during a period of strife for Lassiters, as its staff are facing the consequences of the recently failed Lassiters Fashion Week, which resulted in the general manager being fired. The character was originally announced as Sam Ellis, but was later revealed to be the daughter of Mike Young (Guy Pearce), who returned for the series' final episodes. Pearce is a family friend of Graham's, and requested to work with her as part of his appearance. He also suggested that Sam could be Mike's daughter. Graham's character was named after a "well-known" Neighbours fan and Sam's mother was named after Kate Winslet's Titanic character, Rose. Graham reprised her role as Sam in a regular capacity for the Neighbours reboot, with her return airing on 18 September 2023.

Sam is greeted by her new boss Chloe Brennan on her first day at Lassiters, and is told to head inside ready for her induction. A few days later, Chloe thanks Sam for a report and tells her they can do a maintenance check in the conference room if she is up for it. Sam checks that Chloe is okay following the recent death of her stepson. Sam receives help from the hotel's former manager, Terese Willis (Rebekah Elmaloglou), while doing jobs for the owner, Paul Robinson (Stefan Dennis). She hides the fact that Terese is helping with hotel work from Wendy Rodwell (Candice Leask) and Paul, who congratulates Sam for doing her job well. Sam later asks Chloe how she feels about Lassiters upon hearing that Paul may be buying Terese out of the business. Sam visits Chloe once she learns that she is selling her house and resigning from Lassiter's. Chloe also tells Sam that she has requested the new owner of Lassiter's keeps Sam employed. When Mike Young returns to Erinsborough, it is revealed that Sam is his daughter. Sam has drinks with Mike and his old friends and they decide to visit Ramsay Street. Sam later visits Ramsay Street with her father, and encourages him to rekindle his relationship with Jane Harris (Annie Jones). She is enthused at the prospect of Mike buying 24 Ramsay Street.

Off screen, Sam moves into 24 Ramsay Street with Jane and Mike. When the series returned, Mike has an extended stay in Europe for work. Sam travels to England to visit Mike for Christmas. Sam babysits Jane's granddaughter Isla Tanaka-Brennan (Hannah Abe-Tucker). After the arrival of Jane's ex husband Victor Stone (Craig Hall), she becomes concerned after Jane becomes to grow close to him. Sam catches Vic resting in Jane and Mike's bed and orders Jane to speak to Mike. When Mike and Jane subsequently break up, Mike calls Sam and they discuss that she will continue to stay with Jane. Sam is last seen when her mother, Rose, arrives to take her to Mike's wedding.

== Byron Stone ==
Byron Stone
- Neighbours character
- Portrayed by: Joe Klocek (2022); Xavier Molyneux (2023–2025)
- Duration: 2022–2025
- First appearance: 11 July 2022
- Last appearance: 11 December 2025
- Introduced by: Jason Herbison
In-universe information
- Occupation: Escort; Junior Law Associate; Hotel porter
- Father: Victor Stone
- Mother: Jane Harris
- Sisters: Nicolette Stone
- Nieces: Isla Tanaka-Brennan

Byron Stone, played by Joe Klocek and Xavier Molyneux, made his first appearance on 11 July 2022 in Australia and on 24 June 2022 in the UK. The character was originally played by Klocek, whose casting details were announced on 12 June 2022 via Digital Spy. He previously guested in the serial as Evan Lewis in 2017. The character is the son of Jane Harris and brother of Nicolette Stone (Charlotte Chimes). He turns up unannounced at Jane's home, where she and Aaron Brennan (Matt Wilson) are "stunned" to find him using their pool. Jane is glad to have Byron back in her life, as he has been away travelling. Byron was billed as "Jane's golden child" and a "charming newcomer". Script producer Shane Isheev revealed that the serial's cancellation prevented Byron from becoming a regular character, which was the original intention, however producers still wanted viewers to see the character on screen. Isheev told Joe Julians of Digital Spy, "He is a character that we would have got a lot of mileage out of, and he would have stuck around long-term." Klocek made his final appearance on 26 July 2022.

On 15 July 2023 it was announced that Byron would return in new episodes of Neighbours from September 2023, with Molyneux taking over the role. Molyneux had previously been pictured on set in May 2023 with guest star Mischa Barton, who plays Reece Sinclair. On joining the serial, Molyneux stated "It's difficult to describe what joining Neighbours has meant to me, having watched it growing up with my sisters pretzeled around our television. It was Simpsons and Neighbours every night without fail. It's been a huge change of pace from working as a paramedic with NSW Ambulance but I've had some great people helping me along the way." He went on to praise Jones for helping him out on set and Barton for making his first days fun.

Molyneux decided to leave Neighbours in 2025. His departure scenes were broadcast in August 2025 in a storyline featuring Byron going travelling. Molyneux returned for the final episode on 11 December 2025 reuniting with friends and neighbours. Molyneux reprised the role for the show's final episodes.

Jane Harris and her housemate, Aaron Brennan (Matt Wilson), spot Byron swimming in their pool, but are unaware of who he is. When Aaron yells at Byron, Jane realises he is her son and greets him along with his sister Nicolette Stone. Byron tells them that he tried using the front door, but there was no answer, so he went for a swim. Byron is shy to hold his niece, Isla Tanaka-Brennan (Mary Finn), and explains that he is moving to Erinsborough, before declining Jane's offer of moving in with them. Byron also explains that he has finished his law degree and Jane suggests he asks Toadie Rebecchi (Ryan Moloney) for a job. Byron meets Terese Willis (Rebekah Elmaloglou) and Toadie and overhears them talking about Sapiko and Bas Holdings, a company Terese's ex-husband is investing their divorce money into. Byron tells them that people use the company as a way to put their money into secret trust accounts. Toadie then offers Byron a job as a junior associate at his law firm. Byron meets with Danielle Pendlebury (Christine Stephen-Daly), who has employed him as her escort, and Byron says that no one else can know of his work. Byron then has sex with Danielle to ensure she will not tell anyone. While spending time with Danielle, Byron listens to her speaking to her boyfriend on the phone and Byron realises she is secretly dating Jane's partner, Clive Gibbons (Geoff Paine), after meeting him and recognising his voice.

Byron organises a date with Amy Greenwood (Jacinta Stapleton), but when he sees Nicolette with her, he cancels. He later tells Nicolette that he thinks Clive is having an affair and reveals that he is an escort. Byron looks for more evidence of Clive's affair and finds his phone number in Danielle's phone, however, Danielle catches him going through her things and fires him. Nicolette later visits Danielle's house and takes a photo of her touching Clive's face, before she and Byron tell Jane they think Clive is having an affair. When Byron tells her he found out through his job as an escort, a picture of Mrs Mangel (Vivean Gray) falls to the ground. After Jane breaks up with Clive, she forces Byron between his two jobs and he chooses escorting. Byron gets notified of a client requesting his services in Cape Town, so he says goodbye to his family and Jane apologises for treating him harshly. She explains that it was not her intention to kick him out and Byron tells her to take advantage of her time now that she is no longer dating. Later, Byron and Jane give their goodbyes and Byron leaves.

Byron later returns to Erinsborough and begins a secret relationship with Reece Sinclair (Mischa Barton). Bryon is unaware that Reece's family own part of the hotel, Lassiter's which he works at. Lucy Robinson (Melissa Bell) recognises Reece and everyone is shocked that she concealed her identity. Reece tells Byron that she has genuine feelings for him and was not using him. The hotel's owner Paul Robinson (Stefan Dennis) asks Byron to flirt with Reece and gain information about her visit. Paul does not realise that Byron's loyalty is with Reece and he updates Reece on Paul's scheming. Paul discovers footage of Byron and Reece kissing and fires Byron for his deception. Reece reveals her ulterior motive for being in Erinsborough is to find her missing sister, Krista Sinclair (Majella Davis). He agrees to help Reece find her and they go on a road trip to find her. When they return, Bryon's friends find Krista alive. Reece receives news that her father has had a stroke and she returns to her home in the US. Bryon agrees to look after Krista but when Reece's father dies, he wants to join her in the US to support her. Reece tells Byron their relationship is over.

Byron begins to consider returning to male escorting, drinks alcohol regularly and argues with his friend Haz Devkar (Shiv Palekar). Nicolette becomes concerned about Byron's wellbeing and puts a stop to his escorting. Byron later returns to work at Lassiters and repairs his friendship with Haz. At a party, Byron gets drunk and has sex with his friend, Sadie Rodwell (Emerald Chan). Byron realises they have chemistry and tells Haz he wants to explore their relationship. Holly Hoyland (Lucinda Armstrong Hall) tells Byron that Sadie wanted to lose her virginity to Byron. He feels used and objectified considering his male escorting past. Sadie explains that her intentions were genuine and they begin dating. Sadie requests they keep their relationship a secret from her parents, Andrew Rodwell (Lloyd Will) and Wendy Rodwell (Candice Leask) because they tend to meddle in her life. On their first date, Byron organises a fancy dress themed morning. He and Sadie become passionate on their coach and are disturbed by Andrew.

Byron's father, Victor Stone (Craig Hall), makes a surprise visit to Erinsborough to visit his ex-wife, Jane and his children. While Nicolette is joyful to have her father come and visit, Byron and his mother are suspicious about Vic's sudden arrival. Claiming to be broke, Vic asks Byron to sleep on his couch, and takes an interest in his children's career aspirations. Viewing his father as a sketchy, selfish sleazebag, Byron is confused when he witnesses an uncomfortable exchange between Sadie and Vic, with the latter being in possession of over $1 million after Sadie accidentally discovers an email revealing his terminal cancer diagnosis. As Byron is collectively angered by Vic's actions towards Sadie, Wendy and Krista, he tells his father that he resents him and wished he never came to Erinsborough. Vic then reveals to his children and Jane that he has terminal cancer and did not have long to live, which shocks Byron and causes him to apologise to his father. Vic intends to spend his final days with his children, and invest his remaining money into a business legacy for the Stone family. As Vic and Byron begin to bond, Byron is then frustrated to realise that his father is meddling in his relationship with Sadie, after Vic fabricates to Wendy about Byron's intentions to marry Sadie and have children together. After identifying Yorokobi Vineyard's financial struggles given the wine poisoning, Vic makes an offer to Leo that would result in Byron and Nicolette being business partners. Leo eventually accepts Vic's revised offer of a 51-49 stake, much to the excitement of Byron and Nicolette. However, Vic has entered remission for his cancer, causing him to run away from Erinsborough knowing he is no longer dying.

== Others ==
Date(s)	Character	Actor	Circumstances
20 January	Jim	Uncredited (voice)	A Lassiter's maintenance worker, who Terese Willis phones during the storm that engulfs the wedding of Kyle Canning and Roxy Willis. Terese informs Jim of the damage sustained to The Waterhole, before he calls her back and advises her that all areas must be evacuated, including The Flamingo Bar, where the wedding party has moved to.
24 January	Annie Barnes	Melanie Beddie	Britney Barnes' parents, who attend their daughter's memorial service. They tell Britney's partner, Leo Tanaka, that they have requested half of her ashes, leaving the remainder to him to distribute as he wishes.
24 January	George Barnes	Mick Alford	Britney Barnes' parents, who attend their daughter's memorial service. They tell Britney's partner, Leo Tanaka, that they have requested half of her ashes, leaving the remainder to him to distribute as he wishes.
24 January	Celebrant Ruby Fulton	Elizabeth Sandy	The celebrant who conducts Britney Barnes' memorial service.
27 January	Eddie Martinelli	Adam T Perkins	A street food vendor, who sells his van to Amy Greenwood for $25,000, while reassuring her that the van will make her a profit.
27 January–25 April	Aubrey Laing	Etoile Little	Sadie Rodwell's best friend, who it ultimately transpires has been coercing her into misbehaviours for a number of years. After orchestrating the plan to drive Zara Selwyn out of Erinsborough, Aubrey admits the truth to Zara and proceeds to start the fire in Erinsborough High's art department, which traps Zara and Mackenzie. Zara gets out and accuses her and Sadie of starting the fire, but Aubrey tells Susan Kennedy that she and Sadie saw Zara lighting the fire, causing Zara to attack her. Aubrey insists that Sadie does not confess, even after Zara is arrested, threatening to accuse Sadie of making her participate in the arson attacks. After Sadie confesses, both girls are expelled from Erinsborough High, and Aubrey leaves her new school shortly after due to bullying. She tells Zara, thinking she will be pleased that they are equally miserable now. Later, Aubrey attends a meeting with her grandmother, Shannon Laing and teacher Curtis Perkins regarding her home schooling. She expresses irritation that Shannon frequently ignores what she is saying, and later urges Curtis to encourage her to seek help. She also thanks Zara for putting in a good word with Jane about her schooling. When Shannon agrees to have a hearing test, Aubrey researches some possible locations online. After the test, she has coffee with Shannon and the two look forward to a more positive relationship in the future.
31 January	Nick Michaelopolos	Marcus Hensley	A tree-jumping instructor, who asks Kyle Canning if he is scared of heights.
1–17 February	Patrick Patinka	Bailey Barbour	An Erinsborough High student, thanks Zara Selwyn for setting off the fire alarm and giving him the morning off school. He later congratulates Zara for pulling a prank on Jane Harris.
2 February	Ben McNulty	Jamal Ali	A server at Leo Tanaka's vineyard, who informs Leo and Glen Donnelly that the delivery driver has dropped a client's wine order.
14–17 February, 17 May	Dr Oscar Russell	Adam Rowland	A liver specialist hired by Paul Robinson to play up the severity of his condition to gain sympathy from his wife. Dr Russell assures Paul that he will look over his notes and come up with a diagnosis that suits. He later suggests that Paul says he has hepatic subcapsular haematoma, a clot formed by bleeding from the liver. He gives Paul a list of symptoms and then explains it all to his wife, Terese Willis. Dr Russell later meets with fellow doctors Karl Kennedy and David Tanaka to discuss the case, but refuses to share his images and tells them their questions are inappropriate as Paul is no longer their patient. David uncovers Paul's scheme and reports Dr Russell for unethical behaviour. Months later, David notices Oscar in The Waterhole and Oscar remarks that he is no longer a doctor and has been people watching, leading David to realise he has been blackmailing him and Freya Wozniak over the death of Gareth Bateman. David and Freya later report Oscar to the police for blackmailing them.
15 February	Alex Weinert	Joe Pearson	Freya Wozniak spots Alex sitting on a bench and approaches him, thinking he is Gareth Bateman. When he turns around, she apologises for mistaking him for someone else.
22 February	Theo Lyons	James Cutler	A Benalla local, who overhears Roxy Willis, Ned Willis and Harlow Robinson talking about the Wozniak family. He tells them they were his neighbours and that they had a granddaughter called Freya, but they moved to Echuca twenty years ago to work in the hospital.
2 March–17 May	Constable Eliz Arkin	Tayla Duyal	Levi Canning's colleague, who tells him that his requested trace on Gareth Bateman's mobile phone number has resulted in a location. Levi takes the address and says that he will check it out himself. Days later, Arkin arrests Zara Selwyn for arson. Arkin sits in as Sergeant Andrew Rodwell interviews David Tanaka over the death of Gareth Bateman.
3 March	Joel Park	Brayden Lewtas	A criminal who holds Levi Canning at gunpoint after catching him searching his property. Levi explains that he traced a phone to the address and Joel tells him he got it at the South Melbourne market. He threatens to shoot Levi, as he refuses to believe that Levi will just walk away and not report the incident. Freya Wozniak's sudden appearance distracts Joel, allowing Levi to tackle him to the ground and arrest him.
10 March	Mickey Mannion	James Dean	Levi Canning and Freya Wozniak visit Mickey to ask about a mobile phone stolen from his store by Joel Park. Levi explains that it used to belong to someone they are looking for. Mickey tells them that his stock comes from all over the country, but when Levi threatens to shut down the store and take a look at his general operations, Mickey says he will give them a name.
10 March	Tina Halliday	Alessandra Merlo	Mickey Mannion lets Tina know that Levi Canning and Freya Wozniak are asking about a phone she supplied to his store, so when they turn up she tells them that the phone came from a tip, but she does not know which one. Freya shows Tina a photo of her boyfriend, but Tina says she does not recognise him. After Levi and Freya leave, Tina contacts someone to let them know that the phone they wanted destroyed is still around and people are asking questions.
14 March–17 May	Dean Covey	Travis Cotton	A hospital cleaner and friend of David Tanaka, who he introduces to Levi Canning and Freya Wozniak at a party. When Dean bumps into Aaron Brennan causing him to spill his drink down his shirt, Dean offers to help get the stain out. Dean asks Aaron if he is doing okay and mentions that David has told him all about their situation with Abigail Tanaka, causing tension between Aaron and David. During his shift, Dean asks Karl Kennedy about David, as he is worried about him, but Karl assures him that David is fine. David later confides in Dean about the state of his marriage. Aaron sees them together and confronts them, leading Dean to insult him. Aaron grabs Dean and pushes him up against a car. David later apologises to Dean for not getting in contact after the incident with Aaron. Dean tells David that he is worried about him, as he looks like how Dean felt before his break-up. David assures him that he and Aaron are not breaking up. Dean then tells David that he thinks he is fantastic and tries to kiss him, which David dodges. He says he loves his husband and he and Dean are just friends, but Dean believes Aaron is wrong for him. David replies that Dean is wasting his time and leaves the office. Aaron is admitted to the hospital with a head injury and Dean begins hanging around his room. David tells him to leave and that he has not told Aaron about Dean's attempt to kiss him, which Dean believes is because David is afraid of Aaron. Dean later finds one of the books he gave David in Aaron's bag and takes it back. He assumes Aaron took it from David and calls him possessive. He says David does not have to stand by Aaron just because he is injured. Dean then tells Aaron about the near-kiss. David orders him to leave and then tells Dean that he may have set Aaron's recovery back. Dean maintains that David is only with Aaron because of his injury, but David says he is not interested in Dean and to leave him alone. David reports Dean to Clive Gibbons, who gives him a formal warning and restricts his access to David's ward. Dean confronts David, who tells him that he just wants Dean out of his life. Dean later goes on a date with Mick Allsop, who warns Aaron that Dean is obsessed with David. David later accuses Dean of playing a sick game with him, but Dean has no idea what David is talking about. David sees Dean meeting with Mick and attempts to confront him again, but Freya drags him away. David keys Dean's new car and goes to his apartment, where he asks Dean to leave him alone and that he has paid the money. Dean is later interviewed by the police and realises that David thought he was blackmailing him. Dean is angry that David thought he was the blackmailer and says that he does not want to see him ever again.
16 March	Nasri Abbas	Youssef Sabet	A firefighter, who attends a fire at Erinsborough High. Principal Susan Kennedy informs him that there is at least one person trapped in an art room and a teacher, Jane Harris, has gone inside to look for her. Karl Kennedy tells Nasri that another person has gone into the building and Jane has still not come out. Nasri later calls Susan to inform her that the fire was started deliberately.
23–30 March	Gareth Bateman	Jack Pearson	Freya Wozniak's estranged boyfriend. Ned Willis and Harlow Robinson follow him around a caravan park and take his photo, which Emma McIver witnesses. They confront Ned and Harlow, who explain that they are there on behalf of Freya. Gareth tells them he is hiding from Freya and not gangsters or corrupt police officers. He explains that Freya became obsessive and controlling, and that he decided to leave Echuca after she staged a break in. Gareth follows Freya and her friends to the River Bend Getaway, after seeing a photo of them online. He finds Levi Canning, who has been helping Freya, and threatens him with a gun. Levi manages to wrestle the gun from Gareth and throws it into the water. As he escapes, Gareth recovers the gun and shoots him in the arm. Gareth finds Freya after hearing her calling for Levi. She assumes gangsters are after Gareth, until she sees Levi and Gareth pulls the gun on her. He forces her to drive them away in the minibus, where he explains that while he was working at the courthouse, he would pass on notes about the juries to help the gangsters, who offered him protection. However, when someone got suspicious, he had to go on the run. He admits that he was sent to kill Levi before he found out the truth. One of the tyres suffers a puncture, so Gareth gets out to fix it and is surprised by Aaron Brennan, who was sleeping on the bus. Gareth beats him unconscious and then forces Freya to drive away, but when she swerves to avoid Levi, Gareth is thrown through the windscreen. Freya and David Tanaka go to treat him, but after David learns he attacked Aaron, he declares Gareth cannot survive his injuries and neither of them administer medical treatment, so Gareth dies.
23 March–20 July	Emma McIver	Jessica Clarke	A resident of a caravan park, who spots Ned Willis and Harlow Robinson taking photos of Gareth Bateman. They tell her they are just researching caravans to rent, but soon reveal to her and Gareth that they are there on behalf his former girlfriend, Freya Wozniak. As Gareth tells them about Freya's obsessive behaviour towards him, Emma says that Freya became unhinged when she and Gareth got together. Following Gareth's death, Emma comes to Erinsborough to see Freya and accuses her and David Tanaka of letting Gareth die. She later confronts David, but Freya drags her away and tells her they did her a favour, as Gareth was no good. Levi Canning finds Emma following a break-in at Freya's home and brings her to the station for questioning, but there is no evidence of her involvement. Before she leaves, Levi warns her to stop harassing Freya. Emma then gives Freya her stolen laptop back, which she claims she found on the side of the road. She tells Freya that Gareth was a good person and did not deserve what happened. Months later, Emma approaches Freya and tells her that she knows David is being targeted in prison by a friend of Gareth's, and that she can get him to back off if Freya helps her later on. Freya and Aaron Brennan later meets Emma at a warehouse and Emma orders Freya to treat Jess Nichols' leg wound. Emma bursts into Freya's home with a gun and Austin Julians, who has been shot. She takes Freya and Kiri Durant's phones and orders Freya to treat Austin, or David will be hurt. Freya tells Emma that Austin needs surgery because he is bleeding out, but when Emma fires the gun into the air, Freya tries her best to stitch the wound. Nicolette Stone walks into the house and Emma takes her phone and later calls Dan Waskett, who has David cornered in the prison yard. Freya tells Emma to have a closer look at Austin's wound, as neither she or Nicolette can help. Freya then tackles Emma and wrestles the gun away from her, but Emma manages to send Dan a text ordering him to kill David. Freya calls an ambulance and Levi turns up having heard shots, allowing David to be rescued. Emma is arrested and refused bail.
29 March	Bobby Long	Ben Crundwell	A worker at the River Bend Getaway. His boss, Kiri Durant, tells him to go and collect the minibus with Nicolette Stone and call the police about rabbit hunters. On the way to the bus, Bobby tells Nicolette that Kiri was kind enough to give him a job, after he racked up a lot of debt. They soon discover the bus is missing and Bobby goes to call the police alone.
4–25 April	Shannon Laing	Francesca Waters	Aubrey Laing's grandmother, who asks Jane Harris for help with home schooling, after Aubrey is forced to leave her new school. Jane provides Shannon with the resources she will need and offers some out of hours assistance should Aubrey need it. She also asks Shannon to get Aubrey's mother to sign an exam extension application by the end of the day, but Shannon appears not to hear her. She later meets Jane as she is about to drop off the application form at the school, only for Jane to tell her that deadline was a couple of days ago. When Shannon informs Jane that she has emailed the education board to sort out the issue, Jane insists that she told Shannon about the deadline, but Shannon says she would have remembered it. Jane invites Shannon to her home and tells her that she has arranged for Curtis Perkins to be on-call for support instead of her. Shannon and Aubrey attend meetings with Curtis, who tells Aubrey there is an exam prep workshop coming up. Shannon mishears the date he gives them and he later asks her if she has had difficulties with her hearing, but Shannon is defensive and says she has no difficulties. When Curtis speaks to her again, she turns away in frustration and is almost hit by a car that she fails to see or hear coming. She then agrees to get a hearing test, which Curtis accompanies her to, and learns that she needs a hearing aid.
7 April	Hans Olsen	Bray Buenrostro	A Lassiters Hotel masseuse, who gives Mick Allsop a massage while Terese Willis and Chloe Brennan are trying to pitch ideas to him. Mick flirts with Hans and asks if that is his real name, but when Hans asks if he really wants to know, Mick changes his mind.
11 April	Chelsie Zhou	Francesca O'Donnell	A pregnancy yoga instructor, who runs a class attended by Roxy Willis, Kyle Canning, Amy Greenwood and Ned Willis.
2 May	Nadia Pedersen	Felicia Asplet	Two of David Tanaka's colleagues, who greet him as he walks past them.
2 May	Hannah Forrest	Kathryn Lukin	Two of David Tanaka's colleagues, who greet him as he walks past them.
2 May	Glam Squad	Jordyn Mackinlay; Deanne Ramsay; Anshul Yerwadekar; Courtney Burns	Fashion designer Montana Marcel's assistants, who meet up with Montana to go over a new look. Montana takes a photo with them and asks that they promote Lassiter's Fashion Week in the caption.
12 May–19 July	Zane Wozniak	Oli Pizzey-Stratford	Freya Wozniak's brother, who meets with her at Harold's Café. She mentions that her former boyfriend Gareth Bateman has died, which Zane saw in the newspapers. He asks her why she did not call before now and says that their parents were gutted when she chose Gareth over them. Zane states that Gareth wrecked her life, and Freya tells him that Gareth is still ruining her life by leaving her in debt to some horrible people. She asks Zane if he will help her beg their parents for a loan. She explains that Gareth kept her from her family and that she has missed them all so much, but did not think they would want to hear from her. Zane tells her that they should never have pushed her away and offers to lend her the money instead. Freya thanks him and he tells her not to be a stranger anymore. She also promises to fix things with their parents. Days later, Zane visits Freya to check on her, as she has been ignoring his calls. He says that he has talked their parents around and they want to see her. Freya tells him that she has lied to him and then explains the circumstances around Gareth's death, how she was blackmailed and the charges she faces. Zane tells her he is worried about her and asks her to come home to Echuca, but Freya says she has to stay for her sentencing. She also admits that she is thinking of changing her statement to take the blame for David Tanaka. When she says she needs to be there for him, Zane asks who is looking out for her and begs her to come home again. Zane returns to support Freya ahead of her sentencing by giving her a character reference. He and her lawyer, Toadfish Rebecchi, notice her odd behaviour and she eventually tells them David has been hurt because of her and she needs to sort it out.
18 May–12 July 2022, 16–20 November 2023, 26 March 2025	Georgia McNamara	Jude Beaumont	A defence lawyer hired to represent David Tanaka, who has been charged with medical manslaughter. They meet at Rebecchi Law, alongside Freya Wozniak and her lawyer, Toadfish Rebecchi. Georgia admits that she is concerned that they paid their blackmailer and that they cannot prove that they were about to confess when the truth came out. Toadie asks them about what happened when they let Gareth Bateman die and recognises that they were traumatised. David says he could not handle the guilt anymore, and Georgia tells them that their argument at the sentencing hearing will be impaired judgement due to mental trauma. She explains that traumatic stress caused them to panic and they could not provide proper medical treatment to Gareth. During another meeting, Georgia reiterates that a mental impairment defence is their best option at a reduced sentence. Toadie tells them that they will both need a psych evaluation, and Freya opts to go first as David claims he is too busy. Georgia defends David when he is remanded for a late bail check-in, after being accused of attempting to leave the country. She later informs David's family that he is being sent to a maximum security prison because of overcrowding at the remand centre. The following year, Georgia represents David's father, Paul, when it comes to light that he covered up Krista Sinclair's death. Georgia represents Leo Tanaka when he is accused of murdering Sebastian Metcalfe.
23 May 2022–	Katrina Marshall	Farah Mak	A Lassiters Hotel housekeeper, who is asked to fetch some napkins by Terese Willis. Katrina later walks past Harlow Robinson and is not happy at being ignored by her. She mentions how she and Rebecca Wright have to pick up the slack since Harlow is modelling for the upcoming Fashion Week. She is subsequently blamed for the sabotage of Amy Greenwood's fashion show and suspended from work. Weeks later, she meets with Narelle Campbell and Chloe Brennan to discuss her suspension. Katrina admits that she should not have spoken back to Terese, but denies sabotaging the fashion show. She tells Chloe that she saw Corey Smythe-Jones near the tent at the time and offers them her phone to check for the footage that was projected. After Corey is found to be responsible, Katrina is reinstated and accepts Chloe's offer of four weeks paid leave and a 5% pay increase. Years later, Katrina sorts through the lost property with Sandy Phillips. She helps Reece Sinclair with a marketing project and addresses Paul Robinson. Later on, she provides Sadie Rodwell with the CCTV footage that shows Paul talking to Eden Shaw the night before his son David Tanaka's death. She works at the Lassiters Longest Lie-In event run by Krista. In 2025, Katrina ran a Food Bank at the Community centre, and accepted help from David's family and friends who wanted to honour his memory on the anniversary of his death.
24 May–21 June	Christabel Bancroft	Syd Zygier	A member of The Restoration Order cult. Corey Smythe-Jones meets with Christabel after Harlow Robinson breaks up with him. She tells him that he needs to exploit her vulnerability, so they can bring her into The Order. Corey says he will have to find a new angle, but it will be done. Christabel asks whether he is forgetting something and if he is serious about advancement, but Corey asks her to meet him later. Corey hands over a USB stick once owned by Harlow's mother Prue Wallace, and tells her his new idea to play hero for Harlow. Days later, Christabel asks Corey for an update and tells him that he should have finished with step two, which is isolation. Christabel says Corey needs to move faster and cut Harlow off from everyone that matters to her.
24 May–14 June	Barbara Durant	Wendy Mocke	Kiri Durant's mother, who pays her a surprise visit at work. Kiri shows her around the winery and Barbara is happy that Kiri is doing well after she and her husband sold their River Bend retreat. Kiri invites Barbara to dinner at her place to meet her new housemates, before introducing her to Chloe Brennan who gives them a picnic she prepared for herself and Kiri. During dinner, Barbara tells Kiri that she and her father are going on a long holiday and she just wanted to make sure she was okay before they went. Chloe tells her travel stories, while Freya Wozniak apologises for causing her to sell River Bend, but Barbara and Kiri tells her she did nothing wrong. The following day, Barbara asks about Chloe, but Kiri tells her it is complicated between them. Before she leaves, Barbara notices Glen Donnelly on the street.
31 May	Ginevra Stroynova	Meika Wollard	A model taking part in the Lassiters Fashion Week event. She notices Mackenzie Hargreaves looking for someone and Mackenzie tells her she is waiting for her boyfriend. Ginevra later notices Hendrix Greyson's arrival and asks Mackenzie if he is her boyfriend. They then take part in the first catwalk show of the day.
1 June–21 June	Narelle Campbell	Janeth Mayo	A Lassiters employee, who is asked by Terese Willis to send a message to the hotel's staff saying that she will brief them shortly, following the premature end to Lassiters Fashion Week. Shortly after, Terese discusses Katrina Marshall's suspension with Narelle. Weeks later, Narelle sits down with Katrina and Chloe Brennan to discuss Katrina's suspension. Katrina accepts that she should not have spoken back to Terese, but denies sabotaging the fashion show. Narelle tells her that they are not accusing her, but just asking questions about what happened. Katrina tells them to check her phone and speak to Corey Smythe-Jones instead. After Corey is found to be responsible, Katrina is reinstated and Narelle helps Chloe negotiate a settlement with her. Paul Robinson makes it clear he is not happy about the 5% pay increase, but Chloe blames him for giving her a task she was not comfortable with. Narelle intervenes and tells them to talk it through. Chloe tells Paul she is burning out and wants him to stop taking his anger about his personal life out on her. Narelle recommends that they use a code phrase anytime Chloe feels Paul is being unprofessional.
16 June	Roscoe Dawson	Patrick Gibson	A security guard at a Sydney school. He sees Hendrix Greyson and Mackenzie Hargreaves in the courtyard and chases them out.
16 June	Maeve Rowsthorn	Beatrix Van Vliet	Lisa Rowsthorn's toddler daughter. Her half-brother, Hendrix Greyson, and his girlfriend, Mackenzie Hargreaves, see her on their trip to Sydney, and Hendrix is upset at the prospect of not seeing her grow up.
20 June	Patrick Clio	Trent Sinclair	A service station worker, who notices Harlow Robinson's Signal for Help and calls the police. When Corey Smythe-Jones chases her into a storeroom, Patrick follows and tells him to leave her alone. Corey replies that the situation is just a misunderstanding, but Patrick says he can tell the police that. Corey retrieves a crowbar from his car and threatens Patrick into leaving the store.
22 June	Matt Chan	Joseph Raboy	Ken Chan's brother, who waits by his bedside before taking a break. On his return, he finds Hendrix Greyson and Mackenzie Hargreaves visiting Ken. He accuses them of being disrespectful, but Hendrix tells him that he was just thanking Ken, as he is going to save his life.
22 June	Ken Chan	Richard Wang	A hospital patient and organ donor, who is visited by Hendrix Greyson and Mackenzie Hargreaves. Hendrix thanks Ken for saving his life and tells him about his life. Ken's brother Matt Chan catches Hendrix and Mackenzie by his bedside, and Ken's family later take him off the donor list.
23 June	Wei Chan	Ferdinand Hoang	Ken Chan's father. Mackenzie Hargreaves approaches him outside Albert Hospital and mentions that her fiancé Hendrix Greyson was going to receive his son's lungs. Mackenzie assumes that he took Ken off the donor list because they came to see him. Wei tells her that it is hard enough to say goodbye without people showing up to pressure them into turning off Ken's life support. Mackenzie apologises if he felt that way and then tells him that Hendrix just wanted to thank his son for saving his life. She asks if he will consider changing his mind, and Hendrix later learns his surgery is back on.
27 June	Arlo Anderson	Jacob Towns	A teenager who, along with a younger boy, takes Freya Wozniak and Levi Canning's clothes when they notice them strewn around some bushes in the Lassiters Complex.
4 July	Viv Young	Bonnie Poynder	A waitress at The 82, who notices Estelle Petrides running off without paying for her meal. Viv calls out to her and then begins calling the police, but Glen Donnelly comes over and offers to settle her bill.
5 July	Daisy McCartin	Darci Dennis	Daisy and her mother, Jannie, talk to each other at The Waterhole and Terese Willis eavesdrops into their conversation, jealous of their mother–daughter relationship, which she lacks with her own mother, Estelle Petrides. Darci Dennis is the real life daughter of Stefan Dennis, who plays Paul Robinson on the serial, and the role marked her debut in television acting.
5 July	Jannie McCartin	Raelene Isbester	Daisy and her mother, Jannie, talk to each other at The Waterhole and Terese Willis eavesdrops into their conversation, jealous of their mother–daughter relationship, which she lacks with her own mother, Estelle Petrides. Darci Dennis is the real life daughter of Stefan Dennis, who plays Paul Robinson on the serial, and the role marked her debut in television acting.
7 July	Marlena Tennyson	Trudy Ager	An Airbnb host, who lets Nicolette Stone into Aaron Brennan and David Tanaka's apartment when she comes to join them. Nicolette notices a bad smell and Marlena realises it is a plumbing issue, which she takes care of. She allows them a late checkout and then overhears the group planning a boat trip before David's bail check-in.
7 July	Sgt. Sparks	Andrew Cullimore	A police sergeant, who confronts David Tanaka about being late for his bail check-in. David tells Sparks that he was stuck at sea and tried calling the police. Sparks says that he will count their talk as his check-in and tells David not take advantage of his bail conditions in future.
12–20 July	Danielle Pendlebury	Christine Stephen-Daly	A woman who hires Byron Stone for sex. Byron explains that he cannot be found having a job as an escort, before Danielle has sex with him and they agree to keep the job a secret. During their next meet up, Byron blindfolds Danielle and pretends they are role playing, but she catches Byron looking through her phone and accuses him of trying to rob her. Noticing that he was looking at Clive Gibbons' contact information, Danielle asks him to come over to tell him about the incident. It emerges that Clive and Danielle had a relationship while he was a GP and she later became a benefactor of the local hospital. Clive's partner Jane Harris visits Danielle, who tells her that she is not having an affair with Clive and that he felt guilty about their relationship. Danielle tells her that she recently propositioned Clive and he told her he would think about it.
12 July	Ben Fenlon-Bone	Josh Vinen	Amy Greenwood's date, who she matches with online before he asks her to meet for a coffee. Ben reveals himself to be a superfan of the fictional soap opera One Way Street, which is coming to an end soon, and discloses that he wanted to meet Amy because she closely resembles one of its stars. When he continues to talk about the show non-stop, an observing Toadie Rebecchi interrupts and tells Amy that her dog has escaped. Amy seizes the excuse to cut the date short, and tells Ben that there will not be a second one. Ben was named after the "popular" Neighbours fan account, NeighBens, and One Way Street is a reference to Neighbours.
12 July	Adam Gerace	Lachlan Hewson	A prison officer, who carries out David Tanaka's intake process when he arrives at Warrinor Prison. Adam was named after Adam Gerace, a fan of the series and an academic who later conducted a study on fans' reactions to the show's 2022 ending.
12–20 July	Dan Waskett	Kaden Hartcher	A prison inmate, who introduces himself to David Tanaka and invites him to play football. When David turns the offer down, Dan reveals that he knows who David is and what he is in for, before warning him to watch his back, as some of Gareth Bateman's friends are inside. Dan points out one of Gareth's friends who is in for aggravated burglary and killed some inside over a mistake. He tells David that he will say hello to Gareth's friends on his behalf. Dan later visits David in his cell to toy with him by taking his book. He returns while David is talking with Holden Brice and when David tries standing up to him, Dan attacks him. David is later left alone with Dan in the prison yard and Dan awaits a phone call from Emma McIver. When she calls, David hears his friends' voices and tries to wrestle the phone away from Dan, who forces him to the ground and cuts his hand. David tells his friends to do what Emma says. Dan receives a text from Emma telling him to kill David, but he is stopped by prison guards before he can harm David.
13 July	Zoe Dunn	Alexis Watt	One of Byron Stones's clients, who hires him for sex. She agrees to book him again in the future.
13 July	Mark Simpson	Jack Braddy	A prison guard, who overseas visitation. Paul Robinson asks to see Holden Brice, but Mark tells him he is not on Holden's visitors list.
13 July	Jess Nichols	Ashley Sawko	A woman with a leg wound, who Emma McIver orders Freya Wozniak to treat.
20 July	John Shade	Mark Casamento	A prison guard, who accompanies David Tanaka back to his cell after visitation is over. David attempts to encourage him to agree to a bribe while wearing a wire, suspecting he is the guard with connections to Emma McIver. When the fire alarm goes off, John leads David outside and leaves him alone with Dan Waskett. He laughs and walks away when David calls for help.
20 July	Austin Julians	Ben Rose	Emma McIver brings Austin to Freya Wozniak after he is shot. Freya recognises that Austin is bleeding out and pleads with Emma to let her call an ambulance, but Emma forces her to treat him at gunpoint, and by threatening David Tanaka's life. After Nicolette Stone enters the house, she pretends to be a doctor in order to protract the standoff. Austin's condition continues to deteriorate, though Emma is eventually overpowered. Austin was named after a "well-known" Neighbours fan.
20 July	Jon Dew	Subra Velayutham	A prison guard, who finds Dan Waskett attacking David Tanaka in the yard. He orders Dan to get on the ground and drop his weapon, before handcuffing him.
27 July, 29 February 2024	Theo Isheev	Finn McLeod Ireland	A man thanked by Paige Smith for erecting several For Sale signs around Ramsay Street. Theo also apologises for the previous week when he put a sign up too early. Years later, Theo is employed to repair damage to a wall at Lassiters Hotel. Krista Sinclair instructs him to take care of the commerorative plaque in memory of Josh Willis and Doug Willis, which is removed for the repairs.
28 July	Ice cream man	Jason Herbison	A man running an ice cream stand at a Ramsay Street party. The character is played by the serial's executive producer, Jason Herbison.
