= Amy Greenwood =

Fictional Australian TV character

- Neighbours character
- Portrayed by: Jacinta Stapleton
- Duration: 1997–2000, 2005, 2020–2023
- First appearance: 10 July 1997
- Last appearance: 14 November 2023
- Introduced by: Stanley Walsh (1997); Ric Pellizerri (2005); Jason Herbison (2020)
In-universe information
- Occupation: Student; Waitress; Flight attendant; Manager of The Flamingo Bar; Drinks van owner
- Father: Tony Greenwood
- Mother: Josie Greenwood
- Brothers: Jeff Greenwood; Patrick Greenwood
- Husband: Damien Smith (2000–; divorced); Eric Selwyn (divorced)
- Sons: Jax; Elijah Selwyn; Kai
- Daughters: Zara Selwyn

Amy Greenwood is a fictional character from the Australian soap Neighbours, played by Jacinta Stapleton. She made her first on-screen appearance on 10 July 1997. Amy is characterised as flirtatious and ditzy, especially interested in fashion and gossip. During her original duration in the series, writers created a long-running on/off relationship with Lance Wilkinson (Andrew Bibby). Amy later begins relationship with flight attendant Damien Smith (John Ridley) and elopes with him after discovering she is pregnant. Amy departed on 21 March 2000. Five years later, Stapleton reprised her role for the show's 20th anniversary episode in July 2005. She reprised the role again in December 2020 and later re-joined the regular cast. Her final regular appearance was on 28 July 2022 during the serial's finale, although she returned on 13 November 2023 for two flashback episodes, which showed why Amy had left Ramsay Street.

== Development ==
=== Characterisation ===
Stapleton said she shared her character's "fun-loving nature", but she was not as "sneaky" as Amy and did not play around like she does. Stapleton also said she was not as "mischievous" as Amy, but they both liked to party and tried not to take things too seriously. Annette Dasey from Inside Soap described Amy as "sassy". In 2021, following her return, Stapleton thought her character's personality had not changed all that much, explaining "What I will say is that Amy is not shy! She's not a troublemaker, but she gets up to a bit of mischief, even though I don't think she means to. Amy just runs on a high frequency." Stapleton also described Amy as "excitable" and called her "a bit of a firecracker", a personality trait she found fun to play.

=== Relationship with Lance Wilkinson ===
Amy as she appeared in her first stint

Amy was introduced as a love interest for Lance Wilkinson (Andrew Bibby). Dasey (Inside Soap) thought "nerdy" Lance was not the type of boy people would expect someone like Amy to date, but Stapleton disagreed saying he was everything Amy wanted in a boyfriend. She explained: "Lance may be a real dork, but she loves him for who he is. But he can't see this and tries to be something he's not." Lance's insecurities about the relationship come out when he tries to compete with mechanic Drew Kirk (Dan Paris) to be the main subject of Amy's school photography assignment. Stapleton said that when Lance strips off, he is really pale and "scrawny", unlike Drew. Lance is not the ideal subject for the assignment, so he gets jealous when Amy continues to photograph Drew. In a bid to compete with Drew, Lance covers himself in fake tan, leaving him bright orange. Stapleton said Amy finds it "hilarious" and decides that his unusual skin colour will make for more interesting photos, so she asks him to strip to his boxers and pose for her. The pair are embarrassed when their neighbour Harold Bishop (Ian Smith) walks in on them, but Stapleton said that it actually helps their relationship. She explained "Lance's modesty only endears him further to Amy and she becomes more determined to have her wicked way with him."

In October 1998, producer Peter Dodds said Amy and Lance would continue to become "an ever more bizarre couple", but they would be tested when Lance has a dramatic problem which he has to navigate his way through. Lance develops a gambling addiction, which he tries hard to conceal from his family and friends. Bibby said that his character only realises he has a problem when Amy learns what is going on. Bibby stated, "She finds out he's been lying to her and has lost a lot of money. What started out as a bit of fun has become very dangerous." Amy ends their relationship as Lance's addiction proves too much for her. Stapleton thought that Amy and Lance should stop being "pig-headed" and make up with each other. She told an All About Soap reporter: "They are both very headstrong and strong-willed. Each doesn't want to be the first to say what they truly feel. I can understand how that is; nobody wants to open themselves up to rejection and getting hurt." Bibby thought that there had been a strong attraction between the characters from the start and that they meant the world to each other. He also said that they worked well together "in their funny way."

Writers paired Lance with fellow blonde character Megan Townsend (Allison Byrne). Amy begins interfering in their relationship because she wants to protect Lance. Writers portrayed the pair embroiled in a jealous mind game. Bibby told Belinda Young from TV Week that Amy dislikes Megan and begins following them. He added that Amy continually turns up where he goes which makes Lance believe Amy is stalking him. Lance enjoys making Amy jealous but is annoyed when she sabotages a romantic evening with Megan. Bibby explained that "Amy thinks that Megan is not the type of girl that Lance should be dating, so she decides to keep an eye on him." Amy's suspicions were correct because Megan was just "stringing him along" and they break-up. Lance is forced to apologise but Amy "rubs it in" and continue to play mind games. He concluded that he would like the pair to reunite and added "I think deep down there's an attraction between them both."

Amy and Lance later reconcile, but she soon begins an affair with Damien Smith (John Ridley) and becomes pregnant with his child. Bibby said that Lance only finds out about Damien, after his sister Anne Wilkinson (Brooke Satchwell) tips him off. He explained "Hearing that your girlfriend is seeing someone else is bad enough, then Amy says, 'Well, there's nothing you can do about it because I'm pregnant'. Lance feels like he's been hit by a bus." The situation is more upsetting for Lance because he and Amy never had sex. Bibby told All About Soap's Jason Herbison that Lance always thought that Amy wanted their first time to be special, so they waited. Then he finds out that she had sex with Damien and it feels like "a big slap in the face." Bibby told Herbison that there was very little chance of Amy and Lance getting back together, as he is heartbroken and confused. He also admitted that the storyline was an unexpected development and a surprise to him, saying "You don't hear much about sex in Neighbours, then all of a sudden a regular character gets pregnant."

=== Departure and cameo appearance ===
In November 1999, Herbison, writing for Inside Soap, reported that Stapleton had filmed her final scenes as Amy and she had already flown to Sydney to audition for a new sitcom. Stapleton confirmed that she had chosen to leave Neighbours to pursue other roles. The actress stated: "Leaving Neighbours was scary because for three years I knew what I was going to doing every day. It was my decision, so if something goes wrong it's my fault, which is daunting. I get bored easily, so having something new to do is a good thing and I know I've made the right decision." In the build up to Amy's exit, scenes feature her refusing Damien's marriage proposal because she is afraid to tell him about her pregnancy. Lance then tells Damien the news and the couple reunite. Bibby said that Lance just wants Amy to be happy, so he puts her relationship with Damien above his own feelings. Amy then leaves for a new life with Damien in Fiji. Bibby added that the scenes in which Lance says goodbye to Amy, he was also saying goodbye to Stapleton, and it was only then that the fact Stapleton was leaving really hit him.

On 14 April 2005, Kris Green from Digital Spy reported that Stapleton had agreed to reprise her role for the show's 20th anniversary episode. The Neighbours producers contacted Stapleton's agent about a possible return and she agreed to come back as she was already in Melbourne. On her decision to return to Neighbours, Stapleton said "I was really happy to come back. I wanted to do it for some closure for the character. I really enjoyed playing the character of Amy, and it would be nice for people who remember her to be able to know how she turned out!" Stapleton added that Neighbours was the "best training ground" for her acting career.

=== Reintroduction ===
Stapleton reprised the role for a guest appearance from December 2020. Calling Amy "a heritage character", series producer Jason Herbison admitted that he had wanted to bring her back for a while. Of her return, Stapleton said "As Amy Greenwood has always held a fond place in my heart, to reprise her 20 years later feels like a gift that rarely happens in one's career. She's effusive and flamboyant and joyous to play. Her time back in Erinsborough will see her experience everything from friendship to drama, to romance and heartbreak. It's quite the ride." Amy returns to Erinsborough to help design a new uniform for Lassiters Hotel staff, having established a career in the fashion industry during her time away. Amy also becomes a love interest for a newly separated Shane Rebecchi (Nicholas Coghlan), however, when she realises that he still loves his wife Dipi Rebecchi (Sharon Johal), Amy decides to leave Erinsborough and return to Queensland. Stapleton later told Sam Warner and Daniel Kilkelly of Digital Spy that her guest stint was only supposed to be for six weeks, but it was later extended to eleven. In May 2021, it was confirmed that Stapleton would be re-joining the regular cast. She admitted that she was not expecting to return as a regular while filming her guest appearance, saying "I never in a million years – or 20 to be exact – thought I'd be back on Neighbours at all."

=== Character conclusion ===
The Neighbours finale left Amy's character with an unresolved story, as she revealed that she had found an unnamed donor to proceed with her desired pregnancy. On-screen, Toadie Rebecchi (Ryan Moloney) asks Amy if the donor is someone they know, and Amy responds ambiguously. Viewers speculated that the donor may be Joel Samuels (Daniel MacPherson), who was seen to interact with Amy while she was away from Erinsborough, or Lance. Herbinson commented that "I felt we should include a small mystery or two [in the finale]. I loved the way Jacinta performed that. For the record, I don't know the answer!"

== Storylines ==
Amy is the only daughter of Tony and Josie Greenwood (Sally Keil) and has one older brother Jeff (Brad Flynn), and one younger, Patrick (Matthew Barnes). Amy comes to the Coffee Shop after Lance Wilkinson arranges to meet her there. They go on a date and Lance falls into the Lassister's Lake while trying to impress Amy. In spite of this, Amy agrees to see him again. Lance and Amy begin dating, but Amy's friends begin teasing Lance and generally making fun of him.

When Jacinta Myers (Caroline Morgan), one of Amy's friends, frames Lance for putting a caricature of Susan Kennedy (Jackie Woodburne) in the school paper, resulting in Lance being suspended, Amy and Toadfish Rebecchi (Ryan Moloney) come up with a plan to clear Lance's name by tricking Jacinta into confessing. Amy and Lance stage a public break-up which Jacinta ultimately falls for and Toadie records her confession via video camera after two prior failed recordings and they present the tape to Susan. After Amy reveals that she and Lance are still together, Jacinta is forced to concede defeat. Amy and Lance have a tumultuous relationship and have a number of instances where they are made to feel jealous. Amy runs for school captain alongside Lance's sister, Anne, but both are tied when Lance votes twice, one vote each. Anne and Amy eventually share the responsibility.

After discovering that Lance's mysterious behaviour is attributed to a gambling problem, Amy promptly breaks up with him and they remain friends. Amy receives her VCE results and misses out on her intended course at University. She decides to train to be a flight attendant instead. After Lance begins dating Megan Townsend, Amy discovers that Megan is only with Lance for a bet. Amy and Lance's feelings for one another resurface and they agree to give their relationship another try. When Amy begins to seemingly disappear for days, it is revealed that she is dating co-worker Damien Smith behind Lance's back. When Amy tells Anne she is pregnant, Anne insists she tells Lance, which prompts Amy to confess that the baby is Damien's. In the ensuing fallout Amy feels guilty that Lance is angry with Anne for keeping the secret about the baby. However, Lance is understanding and they decide to remain friends. After Damien proposes for the second time, Amy accepts and they marry. Before parting, Lance tells Amy she was his first love and hopes she is happy. Five years after Amy's departure, she is seen in Annalise Hartman's (Kimberley Davies) documentary about Ramsay Street.

Fifteen years later, Amy returns to Erinsborough in order to secure the job of designing the new staff uniforms for Lassiter's hotel. She shows her designs to managers Paul Robinson (Stefan Dennis) and Terese Willis (Rebekah Elmaloglou), who tell her she needs to make her application online. Amy checks into the hotel and visits Number 30, where she reconnects with Toadie and Karl Kennedy (Alan Fletcher). Amy tells Toadie that her marriage to Damien ended as he is gay and her second marriage ended for the same reason, while her three children are living with their fathers. After winning the contract for the hotel uniforms, it soon emerges that Amy's designs are a copy of the uniforms she had previously designed for Hawke Airlines, who own the copyright. She tells Toadie's brother, Shane Rebecchi the truth and he helps her to work on some new prototypes. However, the original designs go live on the Lassiters website and Terese learns the truth about Hawke owning the copyright. Amy convinces Terese to accept the new designs, and she and Shane kiss while celebrating together. They begin dating even though Shane is newly separated from his wife Dipi. Amy unintentionally interrupts various Rebecchi family moments and Mackenzie Hargreaves (Georgie Stone) calls Hawke Airlines to learn more about Amy's history. Amy believes it was Dipi, which leads to a public fight at a charity lip sync battle. Shane takes Amy's side, but further problems arise when Dipi sabotages Amy's application for the tenancy of The 82 tram to house a boutique. A gas leak occurs at the tram and Shane saves both Amy and Dipi. When Amy regains consciousness, she sees Shane attending to Dipi and realising they are reuniting, Amy leaves for Queensland.

Amy returns a couple of months later, having been appointed manager of The Flamingo Bar. Amy starts brainstorming ideas to promote the bar and mentors Roxy Willis (Zima Anderson), who also applied for her job. Terese and Paul confront Amy after learning she took responsibility for a fire at the Far North Hotel in Cairns, where she was working as a marketing director. Amy explains that her 16-year-old daughter accidentally started the fire and Amy took the blame. Terese and Paul accept her explanation and agree they would have done the same thing. Amy is pressured to keep the bar's profits up over the winter, so she plans a series of events, starting with a longest workout competition. She and Roxy clash and Levi Canning (Richie Morris) is injured when Roxy sabotages the stage setup, leading Amy to speak to HR about firing her. Amy later accuses Roxy of theft and Roxy reveals that she told Paul and Terese about the fire in Cairns. They attempt to get along and after taking equal responsibility for an accidental fire, they realise that they are quite similar. Amy moves into Number 30 with Toadie. Amy kisses Ned Willis (Ben Hall), but they decide to stay friends, as he is her employee and has recently broken up with Yashvi Rebecchi (Olivia Junkeer). However, when Roxy asks Amy and Ned to take part in her advert to win a local short film festival for the bar, Amy becomes flustered around Ned and realises that she has a crush on him. They are caught kissing by Dipi, who has returned to take care of a hospitalised Yashvi. Amy decides not to pursue anything with Ned out of respect to Yashvi, and she later has a one-night stand with Levi. When Yashvi leaves Erinsborough, Ned appeals to Amy to explore their attraction further. Amy dates both Ned and Levi, but both feel they want more than a casual arrangement with her. Ned suggests that Amy enters a polyamorous "vee" relationship with both him and Levi, which she eventually agrees to when she realises she has strong feelings for both men. Amy, Ned and Levi struggle to adjust to the parameters of their new relationship and Levi's grandmother Sheila Canning (Colette Mann) strongly objects when she finds out. When Levi's mother Evelyn (Paula Arundell) visits Erinsborough, Levi initially hides his relationship with Amy and she spends more time with Ned. When Evelyn finds out, she initially disapproves but when Amy makes her see that she has legitimate feelings for Levi, she gives them her blessing.

Amy's daughter, Zara Selwyn (Freya Van Dyke) catches her mother having a threesome with Ned and Levi. Zara tells Amy that she is unhappy in Cairns. Zara asks Amy to end her polyamorous relationship and spend time with her, which she does. Zara begins working at Harold's Café. Unconvinced, Zara claims that Levi has sexually harassed her which ruins Amy and Levi's relationship. Zara makes an enemy of Toadie after spiking jelly shots eaten by Toadie's daughter. Amy gets a parental spray from Toadie, who is angry that Zara is evading punishment constantly. After The Flamingo Bar is destroyed during a storm, Amy learns that her job is not being renewed and she is forced to seek new employment. She irrationally purchases a food van, which dries out her bank account and angers Zara.

Amy is convinced that she had developed a crush on Toadie, who is about to marry Melanie Pearson (Lucinda Cowden). Amy eventually admits her feelings and runs to Cairns in embarrassment. In Cairns, she is approached by Joel Samuels, who makes Amy realise she is not in love with Toadie, but in love with the idea of being in a relationship. Amy attends Toadie and Melanie's wedding and reception party on Ramsay Street, where she tells Toadie that she has found the perfect person to help her have a baby, which she has long awaited for. Lance returns later that night, with Amy breaking the news to Toadie that she and Lance had gotten back together and are planning to have a baby, having taken some encouraging advice from Ruth and Philip to do so. The day after the wedding, Amy reveals to Toadie and Melanie that she and Zara are leaving Erinsborough and moving back to Queensland for a fresh start with Lance; who just accepted a job transfer up north. Off-screen, Amy gives birth to her and Lance's son, whom they name Kai.

== Reception ==
A writer from the BBC said Amy's most notable moment was "Training the men of Ramsay Street for their Full Monty performance." A reporter from The Age branded Amy "Ramsay Street's wild child turned party, fashion and gossip queen". In September 1998, Inside Soap's Steven Murphy observed that Amy was "without a doubt the best bitch in soap".
