= Levi Canning =

Fictional character from the Australian soap opera Neighbours

- Neighbours character
- Portrayed by: Richie Morris
- Duration: 2020–2022, 2025
- First appearance: 15 June 2020
- Last appearance: 11 December 2025
- Introduced by: Jason Herbison
In-universe information
- Occupation: Police constable
- Father: Frank Canning Jr.
- Mother: Evelyn Farlow
- Stepmother: Jackie Canning
- Half-brothers: Dane Canning; Harley Canning
- Grandmothers: Sheila Canning
- First cousins: Kyle Canning

Levi Canning is a fictional character from the Australian soap opera Neighbours, played by Richie Morris. Morris auditioned for the role in early 2020 and successfully received the role of Levi, a police officer and replacement character for Gary Canning (Damien Richardson), as well as a new member of Kyle (Chris Milligan) and Sheila Canning's (Colette Mann) family. Morris called his first day on set surreal and explained that wearing a police vest helped him get into character. Morris described Levi as very passionate, very cheeky and very charming, and noted that he takes his work seriously, but also loves his family. Levi first appeared on 15 June 2020 and quickly became involved in dramatic scenes and befriends Bea Nilsson (Bonnie Anderson). The character's epilepsy was used to explore his backstory.

Levi and Bea develop feelings for each other and producers swiftly introduced one of Levi's childhood attackers, Nathan Packard (Jackson Gallagher), who writers used as a plot device to establish a love triangle storyline. Levi and Bea finally begin dating afterwards but they break up the following year. Morris explained that the break-up was hard for Levi to process, who later suffers an accident caused by him trying to distract himself from the split. Producers then introduced Levi's other attackers, Mitch Foster (Kevin Hofbauer) and Nelson Ryker (Rhys Mitchell), who act unremorseful and taunt Levi, before a high-speed car chase results in a crash. Morris explained there was a lot of excitement and anxiety on the day of recording the crash.

Levi finds himself having feelings for Amy Greenwood (Jacinta Stapleton), who also has feelings for Ned Willis (Ben Hall). Ned openly suggests that they go into a polyamorous relationship together and they agree, which marked the serial's first polyamory relationship. The storyline develops into a rivalry between Levi and Ned, who both compete for Amy's time, and the relationship was unliked by fans, whilst one journalist questioned if the serial's portrayal of polyamory was executed correctly. Isabella Giovinazzo was then cast as Felicity Higgins, another roadblock for the polyamorous relationship, as Amy is opposed to Levi dating Felicity. Levi eventually breaks up with Amy and Felicity. Levi later meets Freya Wozniak (Pheobe Roberts), who manipulates Levi into liking her so she can find Gareth Bateman (Jack Pearson). Levi and Freya later confess their love for one another. Morris' final scenes aired on 28 July 2022 as part of the serial's finale episode. Levi got a mixed reception, but Morris' addition to the serial was seen as a good step in normalising diverse television casting. Morris reprised the role on 11 December 2025 for the final episodes of Neighbours.

== Creation and casting ==
Producers created Levi as a new member of the serial's pre-established Canning family. He is Kyle Canning's (Chris Milligan) cousin and Sheila Canning's (Colette Mann) grandson. The character was created to fulfill Gary Canning's (Damien Richardson) spot, who had been killed off as part of the serial's 35th anniversary. In early 2020, executive producer Jason Herbison told Radio Times, "The Canning house will be quieter without Gary, but there are plans to populate the place with another member of the family soon." Morris' casting and the character's creation was announced by Daniel Kilkelly of Digital Spy on 4 June 2020. Morris said of his casting, "Being a part of the Cannings is so humbling because they are such a fun and iconic family on Ramsay Street, which provides not only loads of drama but also so much humour. I couldn't ask for more. Plus, I get to work and learn from both Chris and Colette, who I idolise." Morris auditioned for the role at 21 years old in early 2020 and secured the part, before relocating from Sydney to Melbourne to act on the serial in a regular capacity. Kilkelly reported that Morris trained at Sydney Theatre School and Sydney Film School, and had made appearances in theatre performances, short films and advertisements, and is also a "keen martial arts practitioner", having done boxing, kickboxing and judo. Morris said that he would be excited to implement martial arts into his acting. Whilst talking to HuffPost Australia, Morris, who is half-Nigerian half-Lebanese, reflected on the positive reactions from "culturally diverse" viewers to see a multicultural actor in the serial. He told the outlet, "It’s very humbling that I am able to come on set and provide a little diversity within the cast. I believe it is very important to have diversity on screens. When I moved to Australia, I was lucky enough to have amazing parents that taught me about what racism might look like and how to peacefully deal with it if it were to ever occur to me."

== Development ==
=== Characterisation and introduction ===
In a video posted to the serial's YouTube channel, Morris revealed that, following questioning from fans, he was the son of Frank Canning Jr., another character created, who is Sheila's son. Levi was raised by Frank Jr. and his wife, Jackie, who had been mentioned since the introduction of Levi's half-brothers, Dane Canning (Luke Pegler) and Harley Canning (Justin Holborow). Morris explained on camera, "I noticed a lot of people online kept asking who Levi's parents were. Levi's dad is actually Frank Jr, he's Sheila's son and that's where I came from." Levi is introduced as Ramsay Street's new police officer and Morris teased that the character had a lot of secrets and told fans that they would "find out soon enough". Morris also admitted that wearing the police uniform helped him get into character and stated that "the physicality of things and even when I put the vest on, it's a completely different feeling and my shoulders go back and my head goes up." He also called wearing the uniform "transformative" on him. Morris explained that he "did a lot of research" on the police force in his own time to better portray his character. He also revealed that he spoke with Mann's son, who is an ex-cop, to help him better understand a police officer's job. Morris described his character as "very passionate, very cheeky, very charming and he takes his job very seriously, but he also loves his family and friends. He is very interesting." Morris also jokingly asked producers to give Levi some designer's clothes, similar to that of Hendrix Greyson (Ben Turland).

Morris first appeared on Australian screens as Levi on 15 June 2020. Kilkelly reported that he would have a "dramatic first week". Morris' first scene sees Levi "jokingly" pulls over Kyle, who is driving with Bea Nilsson (Bonnie Anderson) and is "horrified" to get pulled over. When Kyle notices it is Levi, "his panic turns to relief" and he introduces Levi to Bea. Morris called his first scene "surreal" and said he was "nervous as" and "kept having to pinch" himself because he was in front of Mann and Milligan. Kilkelly also explained that Levi "doesn't get the warmest of welcomes from Sheila" and that Ramsay Street residents would be "speculating over why". Kilkelly suggested that "one possibility is that Sheila could hold a grudge because Levi was conceived when her son Frank Jr had an affair." Levi explains that the force has relocated him to Erinsborough and Kyle asks their grandmother if Levi can move in, but Sheila is "reluctant" to agree, however bosses later announced that Levi would be moving into the street within a month. Levi also helps Toadie Rebecchi (Ryan Moloney) track down Andrea Somers (Madeleine West), who has kidnapped their son, and "classic" dramatic scenes see Levi arrest Andrea. Levi also kisses Kyle's love interest, Roxy Willis (Zima Anderson). Roxy plays "strip dart" with Levi and pours a drink over him when he refuses to take his shirt off, resulting in the two kissing. Kyle forgives him when he finds out Levi was unaware of his feelings towards Roxy. Within his first month of appearances, Morris said, "I've received some really loving fan messages that I'm also very thankful for."

=== Epilepsy ===
Levi decides to help Kyle clean up the island that Gary was killed on, and Levi helps Bea with the cleaning, before having a seizure in front of her. He stops Bea from finding help and explains that he has epilepsy, "a neurological condition that affects the brain and can lead to seizures and unusual behaviour". Levi "begs" Bea not to tell anyone and admits that his family are unaware of his condition. Louise McCreesh of Digital Spy explained that Levi would be "determined to keep the truth" from his family. Levi reveals that his job does not allow epileptic people on the force and Bea worries for Levi's partner's, Yashvi Rebecchi's (Olivia Junkeer), safety. Bea asks what has caused his condition and Levi gets "offended", then tells her that he has dealt with it for most of his life and he will continue doing so. Bea also helps Levi hide his pills when Yashvi catches him taking them. Sheila later reveals to her partner that she has been feeling guilty due to an incident that occurred during Levi's childhood that nobody knows about and the truth would "break her family apart". Later, Levi tells Roxy about "one disturbing night from his childhood", where he was attacked by burglars while playing with a toy train in his home in Frankston, which gave him his epilepsy. Charlie Milward of Daily Express named the event Levi's "tragic past".

Morris' character explained that the incident "deeply scarred" him and caused "nightmares for years", while the fear of the burglars returning was always in his mind. Sheila "guiltily" reveals the truth to Levi and explains that the attackers were Kyle's "criminal friends", there to attack him, and that Sheila did not tell the police to avoid Kyle getting any punishment. Lee reported that Levi would be "shocked" and "angry that he was denied justice and spent years worrying about the attackers." Before ignoring Sheila's apology and explanation, he abruptly leaves and finds Bea to confide in her, whilst Sheila worries that Levi will leave town. Kyle requests that Levi be more sympathetic towards Sheila and dramatic scenes see Levi telling his cousin to get lost. Lee billed the storyline as tense and headlined that it has the "Canning family left devastated". Kilkelly explained that Levi was upset that Sheila had put Kyle in front of him and he remains "upset" with her, before taking "matters into his own hands" and moving out. He also tells Sheila that he will "never forgive her", but later feels financial pressures and eventually decides to move back in with his family. He also reveals that the attack is the "horrendous ordeal" that caused his epilepsy, leaving Sheila in more grief. A few months later, Levi's superior at work, Dax Braddock (Dean Kirkright), discovers his condition and blackmails him, before swapping out his medication and causing him to have another seizure. Levi is found and forced to tell his family the truth.

=== Relationship with Bea Nilsson ===
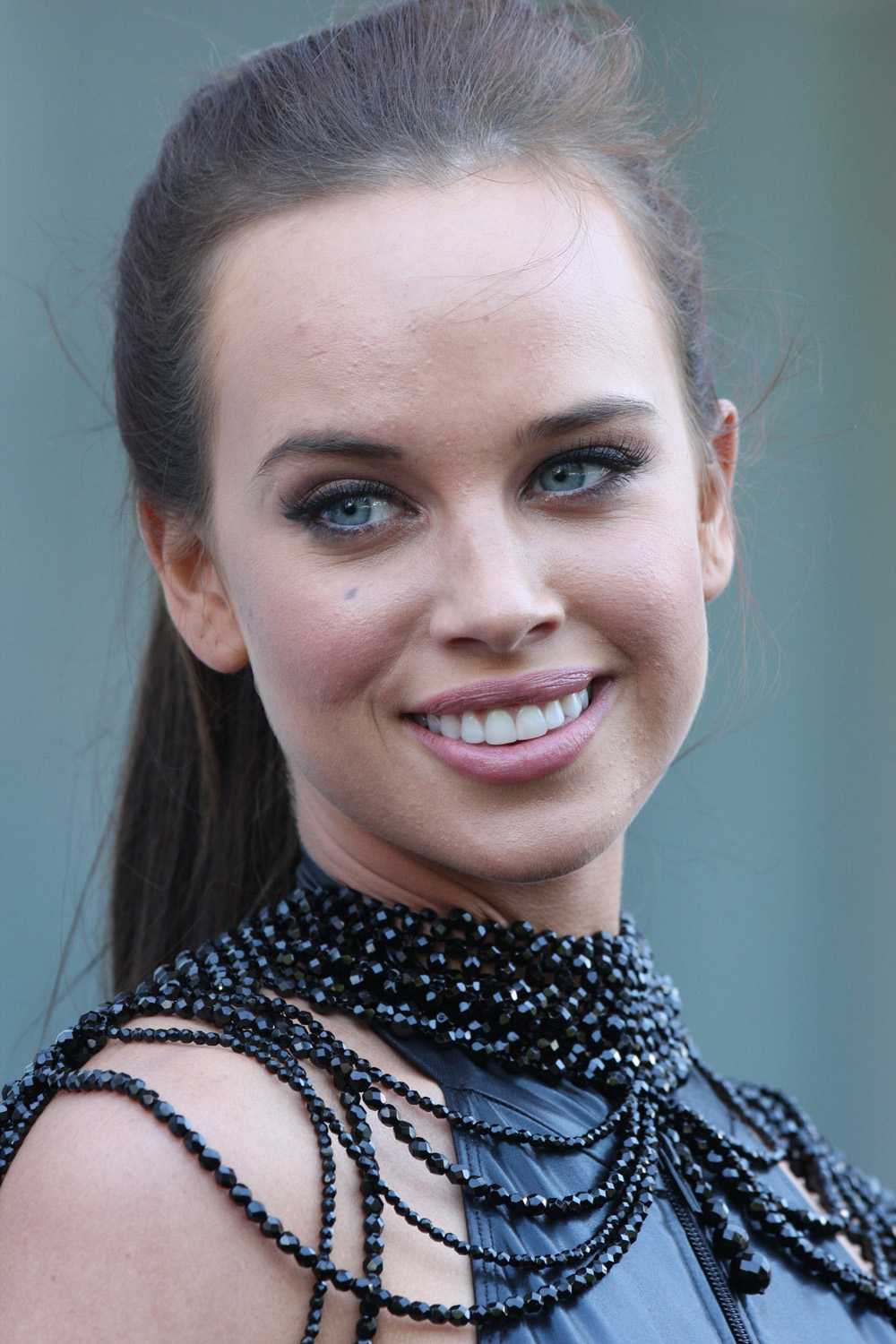
Producers established a relationship between Levi and Bea Nilsson (Bonnie Anderson).

Producers decided to pair Levi and Bea together in a romantic relationship with a long build-up. Levi and Bea develop feelings for each other as their friendship grows tighter and they continue confiding in each other, but "nothing happens between them" for months. As they "continue to show romantic potential", Levi ends up rejecting Bea twice and she decides to wait for him to make a move first, but Levi "puts some distance" between them. Producers then decided to introduce Nathan Packard (Jackson Gallagher) to the serial, who would serve as a "rival" for Levi and a plot device to ultimately progress Levi and Bea's relationship. It turns out that Nathan was one of Levi's childhood attackers, who Kyle contacts to try and give Levi some closure. Levi is unaware of Nathan's identity and jealously watches Bea "enjoying the company of Nathan". Gallagher explained, "Sparks fly and there ensues the love triangle, because Bea and Levi are on again, off again." Nathan reveals his identity in an apology letter which he sends to Levi and Sheila also meets with him to make amends, whilst Bea "is left questioning her taste in men." Levi selflessly encourages Bea to begin dating Nathan. Bea finds Levi the following week to inform him that she will be going on a date with Nathan, but she soon becomes aware of his "obvious sadness". Roxy, aware of Levi's feelings, tells Bea of how Levi feels about her and Kilkelly reported that she would be "annoyed that Levi wasn't honest about his feelings when he had every chance to ask her out". Nathan leaves town as a "reformed character".

It was announced on 28 December 2020 that Levi and Bea would be in some "romantic scenes" together, as things "remain awkward between them", but their family and friends are keen for them to start a relationship. At a Christmas party, Levi is paired with Bea during a game of charades and both guess each other's answers repeatedly, showing that they are "very compatible", and they kiss under the mistletoe at the end of the night after they talk about their feelings with one another. Lee thought their kiss was "About time!" Writers soon establish a struggle in Levi and Bea's new relationship, as Bea is hospitalised due to eating poisoned mushrooms at Kyle's restaurant. Levi discovers that Kyle is to blame and reports the incident to the local city council, causing a "longterm family feud". Morris said of Levi's actions, "Honestly, he's in 100 minds as obviously he's a cop and it needs to be done, but he doesn't want to backstab his family. He has to protect the public's health as well so it's a bunch of things. Levi is very much black and white and struggles to see the grey. It's an interesting family for him to be in." Morris also added, "I was really excited for Levi and Kyle to have a clash, that always makes good television, and exploring that part of the relationship is always fun. But I was really enjoying the jokes I had with Chris Milligan on set and playing that kind of playful relationship so it was good to explore something new between them, but it was sad to say goodbye to their playful side for the time being." Morris also told Julians that Sheila would be trying to mend the situation and said, "She does what Sheila usually does and is trying to show the family that she loves everyone in a way that only Sheila knows how. I don't think issues are ever fully dealt with on Ramsay Street, to be honest, but families fight, they make up and they fight again so I think this is going to be a bit of a rollercoaster." He told Joe Julians of Radio Times that the feud would "really puts his feelings for Bea into perspective and realise this is a relationship he really wants to pursue". The storyline occurs close to Morris' one year anniversary on the serial and Morris explained that was "still loving" being part of the show. He said, "It's honestly the greatest experience that I have had and it's such an honour to be on this show. I think it would be great to explore more of Levi's past, parents and siblings and all that so we get a better of understanding of him and Frankston, where he came from."

Lee announced on 5 March 2021 that Anderson had quit her role as Bea, meaning that Levi's "blossoming" relationship with her would be ending in the coming months. Feeling confident about their relationship, Levi organises a surprise road trip for himself and Bea, however Bea begins to feel doubts about where their relationship is going and breaks up with Levi, before heading on the road trip by herself. The split leaves Levi "blindsided and heartbroken by the break up". Morris explained, "He feels a sense of emptiness. From the break-up to her leaving happening so quickly, he didn't have the time to really process it." To "find ways to distract himself", Levi finds himself "turning to alcohol" and destroys a billy cart he was making with Bea. Levi becomes involved in The Flamingo Bar's Longest Workout Competition on a makeshift, "rushed" and "shaky" stage, before Levi gets "badly injured". Levi pushes himself to the point where the stage falls down from under him and he collapses, but soon recovers. Morris told Digital Spy that Anderson's exit "was honestly such a shock!"

Reflecting on his character's relationship with Bea, Morris said, "I think they both had different perspectives on life a bit. Levi wasn't comfortable with living in a grey area where he wasn't sure of certain things with Bea. And maybe Levi tried to overcompensate by flooding her with signs of gratification and love – it might have been a little too suffocating for Bea. They have different love languages. Levi now struggles to comprehend what's happened. When something ends so abruptly, it's hard to wrap your head around it and make sense of it. So Levi goes to being in his shell, to being full of rage and crying. So it's a rollercoaster of emotions for him." Levi's family are led to believe that he and Harlow Robinson (Jemma Donovan) have slept together, but their theory is busted. Kilkelly also asked Morris of the possibility of a relationship between Levi and Harlow, and Morris said, "I think they would make a good match, to be honest. They are really compatible in the sense that they have a good time with each other. They have a really solid friendship, where they talk to each other and confide in each other about the things that they face and are struggling with – both in relationships and general life. So I think it would be interesting to pursue that. Harlow is, morally speaking, true to herself and I think Levi has that same personality trait. They both stand by what they believe and understand each other really well. I think it's good to be single for a bit and get his mojo back! I don't think it's healthy for him to deal with a break-up by jumping into another relationship – he can barely look after himself in the aftermath of Bea. So he definitely needs to stay single for a while."

=== Mitch Foster and Nelson Ryker ===
Producers decided to revisit Levi's childhood attack in June 2020 with the introduction of his other attackers, Mitch Foster (Kevin Hofbauer) and Nelson Ryker (Rhys Mitchell). Unlike Nathan, Mitch and Nelson are "unremorseful" and Levi begins spying on them, causing Kyle to worry. Levi finds a toy train left at his doorway and his house gets broken into, leaving him more suspicious of Mitch and Nelson, and Kyle reports them to the police. Levi "struggles with his emotions" and turns to Yashvi for support. Morris explained, "Realising just how much this whole situation affects him makes him really consider it." Yashvi takes Mitch and Nelson to the police station to question them about the house break-in and they become "frustrated". Junkeer explained, "Yashvi desperately wants to help Levi. They've developed this really strong friendship. They know they're there for each other no matter what. All Yashvi cares about is taking down Mitch and Nelson, for Levi's sake." Mitch and Nelson then threaten Sheila, who is "rattled", outside the police station. Levi and Yashvi continue watching the pair and Mitch meets with Yashvi to reveal that he wishes to change and that Nelson forces him to act maliciously. He asks Yashvi for police protection, but Levi does not allow it, before watching Mitch from afar go to a warehouse and smuggle stolen drones with Nelson.

Levi and Yashvi then follow them in their car in a "high-speed chase", while Sheila drives to find Levi and watches Levi and Mitch crash into one another, flipping Levi and Yashvi's car. Levi and Yashvi are left hanging upside in their seats and Levi is able to free himself, before Yashvi tells him to chase after Mitch and Nelson, who have fled into the bush. Morris explained in a behind the scenes video, "Everyone freaks out a little bit. Everyone gets a bit frantic because they're kind of like, 'I hope I get to do the stunts' but at the same time, 'Am I gonna die?' But then once we get the scripts and everything looks cool, then it's just pure excitement. All I had to do was hang upside down. We had these harnesses and then they just chucked us in the car upside down and then hooked us up into the seat. It felt unreal." Morris also explained that the "majority of all the stunts is prepping for the actual stunt day." He added that there were many stunt coordinators, who wanted limited takes in order to not waste resources. Morris also claimed that there was "a lot of excitement and anxiety" to get the "stunts perfect because it's massive, budget-wise, the extras and the actual cars flipping, everything, it's massive." Levi finds Mitch and Nelson in the bush and arrests them. When Mitch taunts Levi once more by asking if he was still a little boy, Levi pushes him to the ground.

=== Polyamory ===
Levi begins developing feelings for Amy Greenwood (Jacinta Stapleton), who also has feelings for Levi, but also for Ned Willis (Ben Hall). Stapleton said of the storyline, "Ned appeals to her sensitive side, and Levi is amusing to her. And frankly, they're both very pretty!" Ned later suggests to Levi and Amy that the three of them embark on a polyamorous relationship and, while Levi and Amy are initially reluctant, they listen to Ned and agree to give it a go. Hall expanded on Amy and Levi's reactions by saying, "Amy and Levi were shocked when Ned first brought it up. Ned and Levi aren't particularly close. Ned and Amy are also pretty fresh, and Ned has only recently come out of a relationship with Yashvi. I think they were surprised that Ned would be willing to suggest it – maybe they didn't think that he would be so open-minded. They definitely sit down and come up with some ground rules, as they think it's all going to implode on them. Karl and Kyle are both very intrigued by how that works, so there's a lot of questions. They definitely have to have some pretty solid rules."

The relationship marks the serial's first polyamorous relationship. Stapleton said, "I think we should always try to reflect real intimate relationships in our society. Polyamory certainly is a part of that. The more we represent the beautifully diverse nature and uniqueness of humans, the more people will feel accepted and seen." Of Amy's immediate response to the suggestion, Stapleton added, "Amy likes them equally and doesn't want to hurt either of them. While she hadn't considered polyamory as an option, it presents its own set of challenges." Sheila highly disapproves of the relationship and Lee called it her "traditional views" that are getting in the way. Sheila continues to express her dislike for Levi and tries to convince him repeatedly to abandon the relationship. Levi's mum, Evelyn Farlow (Paula Arundell), arrives in Erinsborough and agrees with Sheila's position on the relationship. Amy's attempts to befriend Evelyn fail and they have a "heart-to-heart" discussion about the "unconventional" relationship. Joe Anderton of Digital Spy described Evelyn's views as "conservative" and Evelyn leaves town when Levi reassures her of his feelings for Amy.

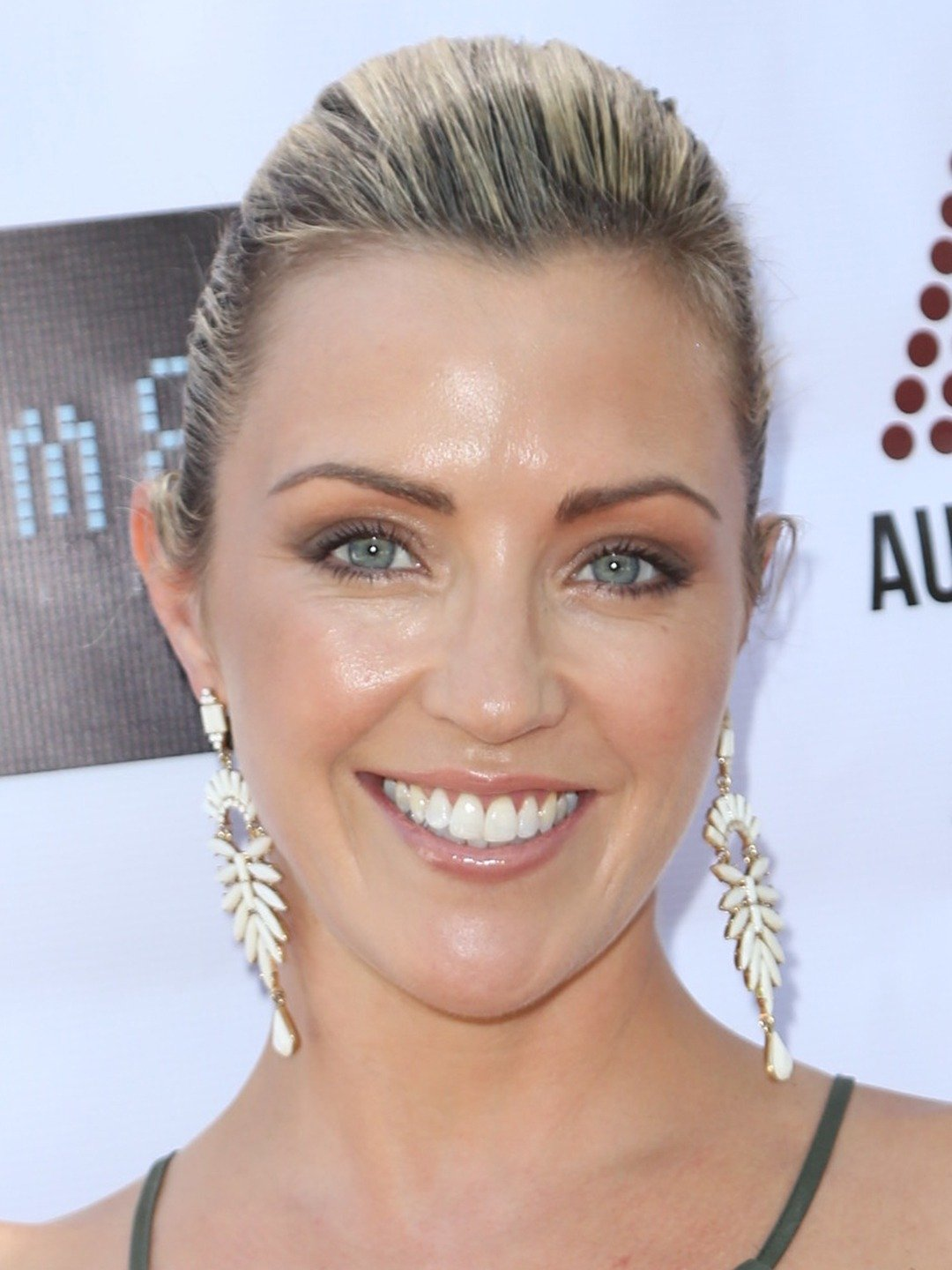
Jacinta Stapleton admitted being "surprised" at the polyamory storyline.

Hall later revealed that he, Morris and Stapleton "were surprised" when first learning of the storyline. He added, "But there are only so many storylines that Neighbours hasn't covered before and this is one of them. It was cool and it's interesting to explore." An article written by Emma Flint was published by Digital Spy on 26 August 2021 which questioned the writers' work in the storyline. Flint expressed that some viewers have issues with the fact "that the two parties aren't as keen on the idea, yet still go ahead with it." Flint questioned whether Ned "genuinely" believes the relationship is right or if it is "about avoiding potential rejection", and explained that television shows can portray polyamory wrongly and wrote "they're valid experiences that have the same depth and complexities of monogamous relationships", while fans did not greet the storyline friendly. A polyamorous vlogger commented on the storyline, "TV shows often use poly as a salutary lesson, a weekly plot point, or a way to help characters strengthen their monogamous relationships. Someone will experiment with poly, it'll ultimately go wrong, and they'll realise that actually, they were happy with monogamy all along. That's annoying. Poly relationships break down all the time, in the same way monogamous ones do – it shouldn't be (and in real life often isn't) a trigger for someone to abandon it altogether." Flint thought the writers were using the storyline as a "throwaway plot device" and "won't only do the characters a disservice but its audience as well." Hall said, "In true Neighbours fashion, they always want to keep it a bit sexy, a bit racy and turn a few heads. But at the same time, all three of us have been having chats with the writers and producers about putting in as much material to make the story as true to life as possible. We don't want to depict it in a way that is overly sexualised or anything like that. We want to have viewers that are maybe not aware of polyamorous relationships be intrigued and learn something, rather than it just being a frivolous nothing, or a relationship that people just condemn." During the storyline, Hall also admitted that he thought "it'll end in tears, but that's because it's Neighbours! I'm sure other people out there, who aren't as unstable as the characters on the Street, would probably manage it much better."

However, Levi and Ned continue to compete with one another for Amy's time and Levi's colleagues begin bullying him for the situation, joking that he and Ned are involved. Katie Baillie of Metro named the relationship "complicated from the start". Amy asks Levi and Ned for some space, but begins to believe that the rumours at the police station are true, so questions her boyfriends' sexuality. Levi is amazed that Amy would ask that question and "is fed up with it", while Baillie reported that he is being treated like the "butt of jokes at the police station". Levi suggests that he also dates another woman whilst dating Amy, however Amy gives him "a big fat no" and tells him she "wants him all to herself". Levi, already upset with her, tells her he is going on a date whether she likes it or not, moving Amy closer to Ned. Levi meets Felicity Higgins (Isabella Giovinazzo) and goes on a date with her, where the two get along very well. Giovinazzo elaborated on Levi and Felicity's dates, "Their dates are really fun. They keep meeting in the same place and they talk for hours, laughing and teasing each other. Then later on, a little bit more sexual tension starts to develop, but it's something that is discovered. It's not there initially. I don't know if Levi used to have that in his relationship with Amy, but because of the tension of the polyamorous relationship, it's dissipating a bit so he finds that in Felicity instead. Then, as they start to get to know each other, it becomes more than that." Giovinazzo said that Felicity isn't initially aware of Levi's polyamory.

Giovinazzo also explained, "He keeps Amy a total secret. Then Felicity messages Levi post-date because it went well, but she doesn't receive a reply. Levi passes it off as losing his phone, but in actuality, Amy took it and threw it in a lake! So there's a bit of confusion there. Things like that continue to happen, as Amy is not frustrated or jealous, but she doesn't know what to do with Felicity or how to fit her into their existing dynamic." She found it "really interesting how Amy tried to be open-minded and fair – if she has two boyfriends, shouldn't Levi have two girlfriends? But it's not what Amy wants and in the end she has to be honest about that. It was really cool to see Jacinta Stapleton work through that and the level of truth, reality and respect she gave to this storyline." Giovinazzo told Kilkelly about Levi's and Felicity's upcoming relationship and said, "There are so many bumps in the road and occasions where Levi has hidden something from Felicity. Felicity tries to understand the polyamorous relationship because she's really into Levi. There are many moments where some new piece of information is revealed, or Amy does something that is weird and uncomfortable or inappropriate! Felicity could walk away at a few points but she doesn't. I think she gets pushed beyond her comfort zone and who she really is, because she's so interested in Levi. It's been a while since she met someone like him, who she gets along with so naturally. So Felicity ends up doing some things that aren't in her nature and probably aren't a great way to begin a relationship, to try and keep him. It's heartbreaking for her because she doesn't want to be that person."

Felicity explains that she is not interested in polyamory and Ned attempts to get Felicity to "give Levi another chance" in order to get Levi to end his relationship with Amy. Felicity and Ned soon team up to break Levi and Amy up, but when the latter finds out, they are "furious". Levi breaks up with Felicity and tries to mend his connection with Amy. To the disappointment of Ned, the three of them agree to go to the Erinsborough Police Ball together, where one of Levi's co-workers makes an "out-of-line" comment about their polyamory. A confrontation breaks out and Levi and Ned are kicked out of the ball and Levi remains angry at Ned for escalating the situation. Ned attempts to get Amy to break up with Levi, but she does not and her relationship with Levi hangs delicately. When Amy has a dream about a threesome, they decide to have one and are interrupted by Amy's daughter, Zara Selwyn (Freya Van Dyke), who expresses her "disapproval". Amy lies to her daughter about her polyamory and Levi decides to break up with Amy after she asks for some space.

=== Relationship with Freya Wozniak ===
As part of the introduction of Freya Wozniak (Pheobe Roberts), Levi meets her when she tries to steal a red scarf from a crime scene. Freya soon explains that she is searching for her missing cousin and Levi befriends her. Levi takes Freya on a joyride in his police car and when he gets out to pick up their lunch, she turns on the in-car computer and looks up the last address of Gareth Bateman (Jack Pearson), who she claims is her cousin, but Roxy spots her and confronts her. Lee announced that Levi would "be heartbroken once again." Roxy breaks into Freya's house to see what she is up to and Freya threatens her with a knife, so Roxy tells Levi, who in return "offers support" to Freya. Freya then reveals the truth that Gareth is actually her boyfriend, who was involved in a police corruption incident, and Lee explained that Freya would admit to "manipulating and stringing Levi along from the start." Levi, who had developed feelings for Freya, tries to move on but eventually finds himself helping Freya's search for Gareth. Roberts told Digital Spy that Freya "reveals to Levi that she already has a boyfriend – Gareth – who's gone missing. She came to Erinsborough to find him. Levi then has to deal with what this means, because this girl has been lying to him for weeks."

Roberts teased, "Freya decided that she could use his connections to the police to her advantage. She'd been worried that all cops were bad and corrupt, but then she met this beam of light that is Levi and realised how hard it is to lie to someone who's so divine. By this point, Freya absolutely has genuine feelings for Levi. She knows him, she's met his family and she's part of his life. To lie to him completely eats at her. She might not admit it to herself yet, but deep down absolutely she does feel something for Levi. Levi is very betrayed by her confession and he storms off on her. Freya tries to apologise, and he won't even hear it. But Levi is also very concerned that she's going to do something stupid now she's in this by herself. He's worried and thinks it's his responsibility to make sure Freya is okay. Even if he doesn't know it yet, he's in love." When Gareth is found, he claims that Freya is obsessive, controlling and her story has no truth, leaving Levi "shocked". Later that month, Levi and Freya both join their friends on a holiday to River Bend Getaway, where Freya admits that she has feelings for Levi and asks him why he is ignoring her. Levi explains Gareth's allegations and Freya becomes "devastated", however Gareth, who has followed the Erinsborough residents to River Bend, makes "a surprise appearance". Levi wrestles Gareth to the ground, disarming him, but as Levi tries to run off, Gareth picks up his gun and shoots Levi in the arm. Gareth dies from mistreated wounds after Freya and David Tanaka (Takaya Honda) refuse to save him and Levi recovers, however puts some distance between himself and Freya. With help from Freya's housemates, she and Levi finally reveal their true feelings and kiss, before going on a remote picnic. Joe Julians of Digital Spy announced that they would "head into some bushes to relieve the months of sexual tension between them", however would return to find their clothes have been stolen. Morris later laughed at the fact that Levi had been in love with multiple women during his two-year stint in the show. When Sheila and Kyle move out, Levi moves in with Susan (Jackie Woodburne) and Karl Kennedy (Alan Fletcher). Levi and Freya make a new Ramsay Street history book and surprise Harold Bishop (Ian Smith) with it. Morris' final appearance is in the show's final episode, when Levi attends Toadie and Melanie Pearson's (Lucinda Cowden) wedding and parties with Freya at their reception on Ramsay Street.

=== Return ===
On 10 November 2025, it was confirmed that Morris had reprised the role of Levi for the show's final episodes. He was pictured in a promotional still released as part of advance spoilers. Levi returns to take part in a protest against the demolition of Ramsay Street, he returned to tour Ramsey Hills and Robinson Towers with other former and current residents.

== Reception ==
Colette Mann said of Morris' acting, "Richie is a terrific young man who came into the show as a serious young actor, but Chris Milligan and I have beaten him into a Canning with a great sense of humour about himself and as loud as the rest of us." A writer from 10Play advertised the new character by saying, "Move over Mark Brennan, there's a new hot cop in town! One of Neighbours most eccentric and colourful dynasties, the Canning family, is expanding their brood as another grandson joins the family." Following Freya's betrayal, Lee wrote, "Levi struggles to get over what happened, and with all of his recent failed relationships including with Bea Nilsson, Amy Greenwood, and Felicity Higgins, he begins to wonder if he'll ever be lucky in love." An online poll run by Back to the Bay in December 2021 found Levi to be the 24th most popular character in Neighbours. The outlet wrote that Levi's arrival "gave Sheila a purpose after Kyle told her to back off." They also noted, "Levi recently embarked on a polyamorous relationship with Amy, and has had to deal with judgement from Sheila, his mother and his colleagues – but, so far, his feelings for Amy have won out. Considering it’s about the only story he’s had since arriving (well, except for finding out who bashed him, and building a billy cart for his now ex-lover Bea), it’s a breath of fresh air to see him in the relationship everyone is talking about..." Morris' co-star called Levi a "beam of light" and "divine". Sharon Johal, who played Dipi Rebecchi, said of Morris' casting, "I love Richie, and I love that he’s joined the cast. Of course, nobody wants to be defined by their race, heritage or look, but it is important for culturally diverse people to be represented and visible on screen. So I applaud Neighbours again for making an active choice to cast him, if that was a consideration. Cultural heritage and significance is important in Australian storytelling, and it is such a large part of our communities as we stand. Unfortunately (or fortunately) until it is 'normalised', every diverse casting in Australia is a step forward." Johal went on to say that Morris "enriches Ramsay Street" regardless.
