= Episode 8002 (Neighbours) =

- Neighbours episode
- Episode no.: Season 34; Episode 8002
- Directed by: Chris Langman
- Written by: Jason Herbison
- Original air date: 25 December 2018
- Running time: 22 minutes

Guest appearances
- Alan Dale as Jim Robinson; Debra Lawrance as Liz Conway; Geoff Paine as Clive Gibbons; Annie Jones as Jane Harris; Rob Mills as Finn Kelly; John Turner as Hugo Somers

Episode chronology
← Previous; Episode 8001	Next → Episode 8003

Episode 8002 of the Australian television soap opera Neighbours was broadcast on 25 December 2018 on 10 Peach in Australia and on Channel 5 in the United Kingdom. It was written by Jason Herbison and directed by Chris Langman. It is the serial's first ever Christmas Day episode, and was created as a result of a deal made between Channel 5 and production company FremantleMedia, which saw Neighbours become the first Australian drama series to be broadcast all year round from 2018. In the past, Neighbours had a season finale like most Australian continuing dramas, before taking a break over the Christmas period. Colin Vickey of Herald Sun noted that Christmas episodes were rare in Australia. The episode's plot focuses on a Christmas concert for the local community, featuring an appearance by Bea Nilsson (Bonnie Anderson), while Paul Robinson (Stefan Dennis) learns he may be responsible for the death of Mannix Foster (Sam Webb).

The episode features the return of Jim Robinson, played by Alan Dale, who reprises the role after 25 years. Dale's appearance came about after he visited the set in April 2018, and Dennis asked if he would be willing to return as Jim, despite the character dying on-screen in 1993. Herbison, who was also the show's executive producer, soon got involved and Dale agreed to film something. In September, Dale confirmed that he had been filming scenes for Neighbours at a studio in Atlanta, and he called his appearance a full circle moment. Details of how Jim appears were kept secret until the episode aired, although it was teased that he would turn up as Paul goes through his "darkest hour".

The Christmas concert featured in the episode is designed to bring the characters together, following the death of Valerie Grundy (Patti Newton) in the 8000th episode. Bea is the star of the show, with Bonnie Anderson making her singing debut after producers decided to incorporate her music career into the show. Further details of Bea's fictional backstory are revealed, as viewers find out why she stopped singing. Anderson did not know how big a role Bea would play in the episode until the editors showed her the scenes. Episode 8002 was promoted with a trailer featuring Bea singing, Paul digging a grave and Jim's voice. Vickery (Herald Sun) named the episode as one of the highlights of December in Australia. Daniel Kilkelly of Digital Spy called it "a Christmas episode to remember", while Johnathon Hughes from the Radio Times thought Neighbours "has pulled out all the stops for the Christmas Day edition".

== Plot ==
Toadfish Rebecchi (Ryan Moloney) practices his speech for the upcoming Christmas concert, while Bea Nilsson (Bonnie Anderson) watches on as the stage is set up in the Lassiters Complex. At the penthouse, Jane Harris (Annie Jones) gifts Paul Robinson (Stefan Dennis) a glass Christmas bauble per a family tradition. She realises that it will be the first Christmas without her grandmother. Bea returns to Number 28, where she wishes her aunt Susan Kennedy (Jackie Woodburne) a happy Christmas, before Susan leaves for a prior commitment. Bea tells her mother Liz Conway (Debra Lawrance) that she plans to open the concert with "O Holy Night", which Liz does not think is a good idea.

Paul tells his son Leo Tanaka (Tim Kano) that according to Delaney Renshaw (Ella Newton), he is responsible for the death of Mannix Foster (Sam Webb). Leo thinks Delaney is lying, but he later returns with co-ordinates to Mannix's supposed grave. Paul decides to go and find out the truth. He takes the bauble with him. Meanwhile, Susan visits Finn Kelly (Rob Mills) at the hospital. Bea pulls out of the concert, and her boyfriend Ned Willis (Ben Hall) realises Liz is the reason behind the decision. She explains that when she was 9 years old, she saw Liz laughing after she froze while singing "O Holy Night" during a contest, before wetting herself. Ned reckons Liz will have won if Bea does not sing at the concert and encourages her to face her fears. They inform Liz that she is not allowed to attend the concert. Susan tells Toadie that she visited Finn because she is the reason he is in a coma.

Terese Willis (Rebekah Elmaloglou) welcomes everyone to the concert and Toadie gives his speech. Liz watches the concert from Harold's Café, where she becomes interested in Dipi Rebecchi's (Sharon Johal) tarot cards. Bea changes her song to "Just for Now", as it explains how she feels about Christmas. Paul's car stops and suddenly spins. He then sees his father Jim Robinson (Alan Dale) in the bauble. Jim berates Paul and asks what excuse he has this time for killing someone. Jim accuses Paul of repeating the same mistakes over and over, but Paul says he is determined to change. Jim tells him it is not too late to be the man he wants to be. Back at Lassiters, Bea finishes her song and hugs Ned as she comes off the stage, while Liz is amazed by her singing. Dipi pulls out the death card and says someone close to her is going to die. Paul digs up the ground and sees a hand. He then watches Jim walk off towards a light.

== Production ==
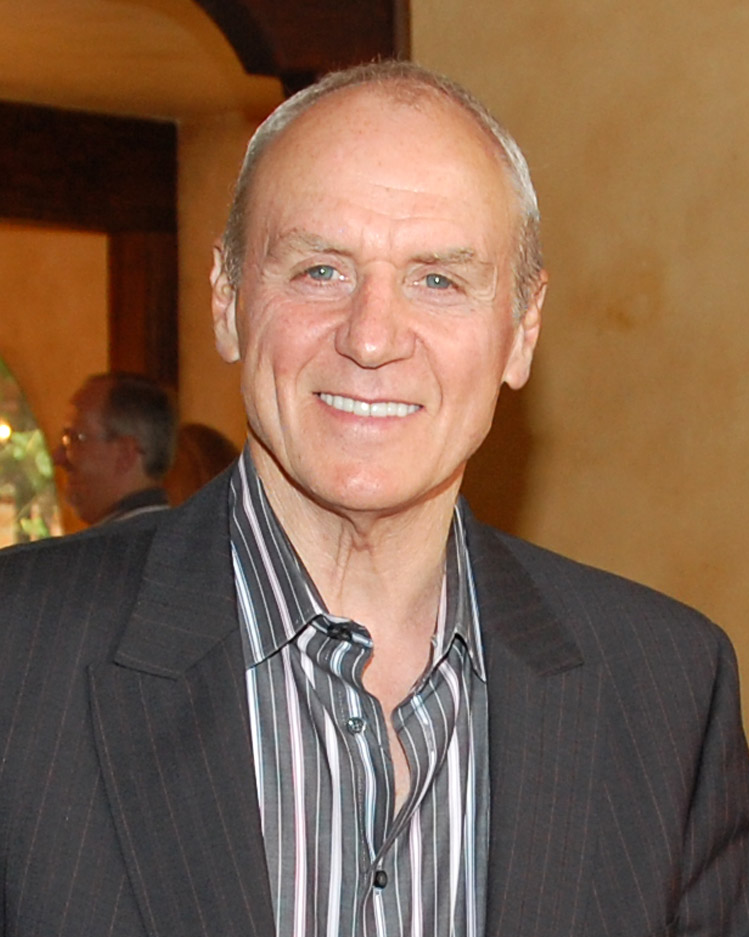
Alan Dale (pictured) reprised the role of Jim Robinson after 25 years.

Episode 8002 is Neighbours' first ever Christmas Day episode. It is the result of a deal made between the serial's UK broadcaster Channel 5 and production company FremantleMedia, which saw Neighbours become the first Australian drama series to be broadcast all year round from 2018. Up until that point, the soap aired a season finale like most Australian continuing dramas, before taking a break for a few weeks over the Christmas period. Colin Vickey of Herald Sun noted that British and American television shows often produced Christmas episodes, but it was "a rarity" in Australia. Stefan Dennis, who played Paul Robinson, said everyone was "so excited" for the episode, telling Johnathon Hughes of the Radio Times that there were "lots of plots culminating at the same time." Dennis said there would be a Christmas concert for the local community, although Paul has more "pressing things elsewhere" as the trailer for the episode shows him digging up a body. Dennis also told Hughes: "We always acknowledge Christmas Day in the show but we’ve never aired it on the actual day itself until this year, so it’s Christmas in real time for the audience." Actor Scott McGregor, who played Mark Brennan, described the episode as "feel-good".

The episode features the return of Jim Robinson, one of the serial's original characters who appeared from 1985 until 1993. Jim was killed off after his portrayer Alan Dale allegedly fell out with producers over pay. In April 2018, Dale visited the Neighbours set in Melbourne, after arranging to catch up with Stefan Dennis, and director Chris Adshead. He said returning to the set was "quite eerie", but he also loved it. He told Sarah Ellis of Inside Soap that he was initially nervous as he was aware that that they had not parted on good terms in 1993, but he felt welcomed by the cast and crew, and he enjoyed himself. While he was in Melbourne, Dennis asked Dale if he would be willing to return as Jim, before getting executive producer Jason Herbison involved. When it was suggested Dale could film something, he agreed. Five months later, Dale confirmed via his social media that he had been filming some scenes for Neighbours at a studio in Atlanta, where he was based. He did not specify what the scenes were about, or whether they were for the main show or an online spin-off. Jess Lee of Digital Spy speculated that his character might appear as a ghost or an apparition to a family member since he had been dead for 25 years.

Dale said he was "pretty pleased" with his appearance as it was a full circle moment for him. He found that getting back into character "came fairly naturally" after watching some older episodes of Neighbours featuring Jim, but that it was also "a strange feeling" reprising the role. Of Jim, Dale commented "He was a nice chap, you know, unlike a lot of the characters I play nowadays." Dale also admitted that if there was a positive reaction to his return from viewers, there was talk of him making another appearance after he finished up on Dynasty. Jim's return is tied into Paul's Christmas storyline and appears as Paul is going through his "darkest hour". Details of how Jim appears were kept secret until the episode aired. Dennis told Ellis that Paul has "a bit of an escapade on Christmas Day", and that after he suffers a mishap "something unusual happens..." Dennis added that Jim's appearance comes just as Paul needs some advice, after receiving "a bombshell" from Delaney Renshaw (Ella Newton) that will impact Paul in future storylines. After Paul learns that he may be responsible for the death of Mannix Foster (Sam Webb), he attempts to find the body in the countryside. However, he crashes his car and when he wakes up, he sees Jim in a Christmas ornament he has hanging up. Jim proceeds to give his son "a stern talking-to" about his mistakes, including his many failed marriages, broken relationships and criminal history.

The episode also features a Christmas concert organised by Toadfish Rebecchi (Ryan Moloney) to bring everyone together, following the death of Valerie Grundy (Patti Newton) in the 8000th episode. Bea Nilsson is the "star attraction", but she is very nervous ahead of the concert as the arrival of her mother Liz Conway (Debra Lawrance) brings back bad memories of a childhood recital that went wrong. Bonnie Anderson, who plays Bea, stated, "The toughest thing when Liz comes back is that she puts Bea down with her music." The actress explained that Liz had made fun of Bea when she was younger, which led to her no longer singing; this was explored in the episode. Anderson makes her singing debut in the episode after producers decided to incorporate her singing career into the show. Anderson admitted that she had wanted to keep her acting and singing careers separate as she settled in, but she felt that Bea's storyline had developed organically with scenes showing that she was singer-songwriter.

Anderson told Daniel Kilkelly of Digital Spy that she was initially unaware of how big a role her character would play in the episode until she watched the scenes. She explained: "The editors showed me the episode and it was so special. This is Bea's big moment where she shows her voice after hiding it away for so long. It was really nice to see it come to life and how they put it all together." Anderson added that she would be "forever grateful" to be part of the episode. McGregor commented that Anderson "completely blows everyone away" and that the moment would make viewers smile. The episode briefly touches on the remorse Susan Kennedy (Jackie Woodburne) is feeling after pushing Finn Kelly (Rob Mills) off a cliff, while Paul's relationship with Jane Harris (Annie Jones) suffers in the wake of his actions.

== Promotion and broadcast ==
Neighbours released a trailer to promote the episode. Set to the Christmas carol "O Holy Night" sung by Anderson as Bea, it featuring scenes of Paul digging in the ground and Jim's voice. Joe Anderton of Digital Spy quipped "it looks like the Australians are taking a page out of the EastEnders book of grim and gritty festive specials, if this trailer is anything to go by."

Episode 8002 was broadcast on 25 December 2018 on 10 Peach in Australia, and on Channel 5 in the United Kingdom, where it was moved to a morning broadcast and an early evening repeat.

== Reception ==
For its Australian broadcast, Episode 8002 was viewed by an audience of 70,000, making it the 11th highest rated show across all free-to-air multi channels, as well as the highest rated show on 10 Peach.

Colin Vickery of the Herald Sun named the episode as one of the highlights of December in Australia, writing "Finn (Rob Mills) is still in a coma but that doesn't stop his presence being felt by the residents of Ramsay St as Toadie (Ryan Moloney) organises a Christmas concert with Bea (Bonnie Anderson) singing." Digital Spy's Daniel Kilkelly commented that it was "a Christmas episode to remember". The Radio Times's Johnathon Hughes stated that "The soap has pulled out all the stops for the Christmas Day edition which sees the return of Alan Dale as Jim Robinson".

The Metro's Katie Baillie called Episode 8002 another "landmark episode" and described it as "a wonderful Christmas Day episode to join our festive soaps." Phil Harrison from The Guardian included the episode in his feature on the "best TV and radio to take you to 2019" along with Coronation Street, Emmerdale, and EastEnders. He quipped "And finally, in accordance with the law, there will be snow. Apart from in Ramsay Street; this year Neighbours (6.05pm, Channel 5) boasts its first ever Christmas Day special."

The episode was voted the 15th "best show on TV over Christmas and New Year" in the UK by readers of the Radio Times, receiving 1.12% of the vote. It was third best soap Christmas Day episode after Coronation Street and EastEnders.
