= Neighbours 35th Anniversary =

- Neighbours episodes
- Gary Canning is killed by Finn Kelly as the second of the three deaths
- Episode nos.: Episodes 8320–8324A (10 episodes)
- Directed by: Chris Adshead; Scott Major; Laurence Wilson
- Written by: Stephen Vagg; Sarah Mayberry; Daniel Papas; Emma J. Steele; Shane Isheev; Paul Gartside; Stephanie Carter; Elizabeth Packett; Jason Herbison
- Original air date: 16–20 March 2020
- Running time: 210 minutes (10x21)

Episode chronology
← Previous; Episode 8319	Next → Episode 8325

Neighbours celebrated its 35th anniversary during the week comprising 16–20 March 2020. This consisted of the five regular weekday episodes as well as five extra episodes as part of a series titled Neighbours: Endgame, aired as the second part to the regular episodes.

The regular episodes were intended as a celebration of the show's past and present, with five weddings featuring characters from different eras of the series, who were originally unable to marry for various reasons. Simultaneously, the Neighbours: Endgame episodes were intended as the conclusion to a Finn Kelly's (Rob Mills) redemption storyline and Mills' third stint on the show.

== Plot ==
All episodes were set over a four day period and were split between a wedding expo in Erinsborough and Elly Conway's (Jodi Anasta) 35th birthday celebrations on Pierce Greyson's (Tim Robards) island.

=== 16 March 2020 ===
==== Neighbours ====
Lassiter's prepares for its Wedding Expo with five weddings and the first being that of Lucy Robinson (Melissa Bell) and Mark Gottlieb (Bruce Samazan). Meanwhile, Elly, her sister Bea Nilsson (Bonnie Anderson) and lover Finn Kelly prepare to leave for a glamping trip to celebrate Elly's birthday with other Ramsay Street residents. Finn has a run in with Lucy who promptly warns him to leave Lassiter's, causing him to place a bomb in her honeymoon package. Hendrix Greyson (Benny Turland) and Harlow Robinson prepare to leave for the island as well, though on the pretence of staying with their friends. Lucy and Mark get married, but Lucy switches the honeymoon package tags at the last minute. Paige Smith (Olympia Valance) proposes to Mark Brennan (Scott McGregor).

==== Endgame ====
Elly, Bea Finn and several others reach Pierce's island for their glamping trip. Finn begins to execute his plan to eliminate Bea so he can commence a relationship with Elly. He pushes her into a mineshaft and leaves her to die after initially failing to kill her. Kyle Canning (Chris Milligan) and Roxy Willis (Zima Anderson) also give in to each other's temptations. Meanwhile, Hendrix and Harlow arrive on the island separately after getting a ride with Harry Sinclair (Paul Dawber) and set up camp away from the others.

=== 17 March 2020 ===
==== Neighbours ====
Mark and Paige prepare for their wedding. Meanwhile, Paul Robinson (Stefan Dennis) and Terese Willis (Rebekah Elmaloglou) are still at odds after Paul wrote a letter to his friend Jane Harris (Annie Jones) using their wedding vows. While preparing for his own wedding to Prue Wallace (Denise van Outen), Gary Canning (Damien Richardson) discovers from Harlow that Prue has been lying to him and decides to join the glamping holiday to make amends with Kyle, with Prue following in pursuit. Paul and Terese reconcile and use Gary and Prue's planned wedding ceremony to renew their marriage vows.

==== Endgame ====
Finn lies to the other islanders by pretending Bea has returned to the mainland on the group's dinghy and is in Sydney by sending texts on her phone. He convinces Elly not to follow Bea. Kyle and Roxy continue to make advances towards each other as they realise they are in love. Meanwhile, Harlow decides to be honest and inform Gary of her mother's deception. Finn discovers that Harry is on the island and has filmed him pushing Bea into the mineshaft. He seduces Harry and asks him not to tell anyone about what he has done. Toadie Rebecchi (Ryan Moloney) prepares to return home, but discovers that the dinghy Bea had "taken" is still on the island. He informs Finn, who attacks him, places his body in the dinghy and lets it sail after puncturing a hole in the bottom.

=== 18 March 2020 ===
==== Neighbours ====
Mark and Paige are finally married. It is later revealed that she has also switched the tags of her intended honeymoon package with that of Prue and Gary's. Paul invites Des Clarke (Paul Keane) back to Ramsay Street to help Jane after she was scammed by an old enemy. However, Jane and Des attempt to avoid each other until she accidentally knocks him over. Karl and Susan start to become suspicious of Bea's whereabouts after she does not answer their calls. Sky Mangel (Stephanie McIntosh) reveals that she is marrying Lana Crawford (Bridget Neval).

==== Endgame ====
After attempting to have sex, Harlow and Hendrix fall out and she goes on a bushwalking alone. She stumbles across the mineshaft where Bea is trapped and, finding her bracelet, tries to rescue her but becomes trapped as well. Meanwhile, Gary arrives on the island and reconciles with Kyle. He also becomes suspicious of Finn's behaviour. Elly celebrates her 35th birthday with her friends, though still remains worried about Bea and decides to leave the following day to search for her in Sydney. Finn continues to manipulate Harry into assisting him with his plans. Prue chases after Gary, but becomes lost. After leaving emotional voicemails for Gary and Harlow, she opens her honeymoon package for a drink and is killed instantly by the bomb Finn planted.

=== 19 March 2020 ===
==== Neighbours ====
Sky's ex Dylan Timmins (Damien Bodie) arrives in Erinsborough and is shocked to discover her engagement to Lana. After a chat with Paul, he accepts their relationship and Sky and Lana are married by Jack Callahan (Andrew James Morley). Meanwhile, after believing that Jane doesn't want him, Des decides to return to Adelaide. Jane chases after him, and they decide to recommence their relationship. Des also proposes to her during Sky and Lana's ceremony.

==== Endgame ====
A storm hits the island, knocking out all phone reception. Finn continues to act suspiciously, and when Chloe recommends him not to leave with Elly to find Bea, he lashes out at her. Finn returns to the mineshaft to see if Bea has died and is shocked to discover Harlow there. Not wanting to let Bea survive, he decides to leave Harlow to die as well. After failing to kill them with rocks, Finn throws a venomous snake into the mineshaft which bites Harlow. Hendrix later approaches Pierce's campground looking for Harlow and is shocked to realise that she never arrived. The others start a search across the island to find Harlow.

=== 20 March 2020 ===
==== Neighbours ====
Des and Jane have an unofficial wedding ceremony led by Paul. After multiple events suggest the idea of marriage to Sheila Canning (Colette Mann) and Clive Gibbons (Geoff Paine), they are relieved to learn that neither of them wishes to marry. When Mackenzie Hargreaves (Georgie Stone) and Richie Amblin (Lachlan Miller) arrive at the expo, they inadvertently slip while trying to explain where Hendrix and Harlow are and are forced to confess the truth. Paul is enraged when he finds out and decides to go to the island himself. Karl and Susan remain worried after Susan's sister Liz informs them Bea never arrived at her home. Paige is happy to move to Adelaide after Jack informs her he will take a vacancy at a Catholic parish there.

==== Endgame ====
Paul races to the island to find Harlow. As he approaches the beach where the islanders left from, he discovers Toadie lying in the sand and rescues him. After Toadie reveals what he knows about Finn, Paul is forced to flag down a passing vehicle to take him to hospital but they are horrified to discover that Harry is the driver. After realising Gary is searching in the area near the mineshaft, Finn kills him with an arrow as he attempts to rescue Bea and Harlow. Elly and Finn prepare to leave for Sydney, but she discovers Bea and Toadie's phones in his belongings and runs with Aster. The other glampers also become suspicious after Chloe shares Finn's troubling behaviour with them. Elly stumbles upon Gary's body and, after rejecting Finn for what he has done, is pushed into the mineshaft too. Finn kidnaps Aster and leaves the island after setting it on fire.

=== Episode 8325 and aftermath ===
On 16 March, it was announced that the anniversary week would be immediately followed by a two-hander episode between Finn and Susan. In the episode, broadcast on 23 March, after leaving the island Finn lures Susan to a cabin in the Snowy Mountains, bares his soul to her and eventually confesses his crimes before digging a shallow grave outside the cabin. Finn originally intends to start a new life with Susan and Aster. Mills told Alice Penwill from Inside Soap that his revenge plans on the island had been ruined. He believes that running away with Susan will solve his problems. Mills explained "Finn's trying to salvage something. Remember, he's not had a strong female role model in his life other than Susan." Mills described the grave digging scenes as a product of Finn not being "a good or safe head space" because he has mentally "unravelled". In an interview with Joe Julians from Radio Times, Jackie Woodburne started that she was "thrilled" about doing a two-hander episode after seeing Episode 8052, which featured Eve Morey (Sonya Rebecchi) and Ryan Moloney (Toadfish Rebecchi). Mills told a Herald Sun reporter that he was honoured to make Neighbours "the Finn show" for one episode. Mills was required to cry frequently during filming and he stated that it came "really hard". The episode also helps viewers understand more about Finn's behaviour. He explained that "I don’t want to compare myself to Joaquin Phoenix in Joker, but you can see the events and moments that led him there. The neglect from his parents, he didn’t fulfil his potential and a lot stems from his childhood. Trauma, PTSD, it all led him to crazy ways."

In the following day's episode, Elly finds Susan and Finn dies in a freak accident while preparing the grave, becoming the third death of the anniversary celebrations. Meanwhile, when the surviving characters return to Erisnborough flashback scenes detail their escape from the burning island, while Harlow and Sheila are informed of Prue and Gary's deaths. Subsequently, Elly is accused of causing Finn's death, with Mark and Sky both remaining in Erinsborough to investigate the crime. Elly is found guilty of involuntary manslaughter and imprisoned, but later released when it transpires that Finn's mother Claudia Watkins (Kate Raison) blackmailed her judge. This storyline also facilitated the return of Madeleine West to the series as Andrea Somers and Dee Bliss. Storylines over the coming weeks also explore the grief experienced by Harlow and Sheila, and the guilt of Susan and David Tanaka (Takaya Honda), who had neglected to recognise the danger Finn posed.

== Cast and characters ==
=== Regular cast ===
- Jodi Anasta as Elly Conway
- Bonnie Anderson as Bea Nilsson
- Scarlett Anderson as Nell Rebecchi
- Zima Anderson as Roxy Willis
- Nicholas Coghlan as Shane Rebecchi
- Stefan Dennis as Paul Robinson
- Jemma Donovan as Harlow Robinson
- Rebekah Elmaloglou as Terese Willis
- Alan Fletcher as Karl Kennedy
- Ben Hall as Ned Willis
- Takaya Honda as David Tanaka
- Sharon Johal as Dipi Rebecchi
- Olivia Junkeer as Yashvi Rebecchi
- Colette Mann as Sheila Canning
- Chris Milligan as Kyle Canning
- Rob Mills as Finn Kelly
- Ryan Moloney as Toadie Rebecchi
- April Rose Pengilly as Chloe Brennan
- Damien Richardson as Gary Canning
- Tim Robards as Pierce Greyson
- Benny Turland as Hendrix Greyson
- John Turner as Hugo Somers
- Matt Wilson as Aaron Brennan
- Jackie Woodburne as Susan Kennedy

=== Recurring and guest cast ===
- Melissa Bell as Lucy Robinson
- Scott McGregor as Mark Brennan
- Olympia Valance as Paige Smith
- Bruce Samazan as Mark Gottlieb
- Christian O'Connell as Anderson Kent
- Stephanie McIntosh as Sky Mangel
- Paul Dawber as Harry Sinclair
- Isla Goulas as Aster Conway
- Denise van Outen as Prue Wallace
- Annie Jones as Jane Harris
- Paul Keane as Des Clarke
- Andrew James Morley as Jack Callahan
- Kian Bafekrpour as Gabriel Smith
- Bridget Neval as Lana Crawford
- Damien Bodie as Dylan Timmins
- Geoff Paine as Clive Gibbons
- Georgie Stone as Mackenzie Hargreaves
- Lachlan Miller as Richie Amblin

== Promotion ==
In December 2019, Rob Mills announced that he had departed Neighbours and that his exit would air the following year. On 4 February 2020, it was announced that the show was planning a massive storyline for its 35th anniversary week with three deaths, five marriages and a central storyline with Mills' character Finn Kelly returning to his evil ways. They also revealed that at least nine characters from different eras of the show would be returning in the weeks leading up to or during the week. The deaths of two main characters who had reached their natural end were planned further in advance, with a third death added when producers realised it would "put the '3' in the '35'". Following the conclusion of the Endgame episodes, it was revealed that the final death would take place the following week.

Following the initial promotion of multiple upcoming deaths in January 2020, Daniel Kilkelly of Digital Spy speculated who could be the victims. Among Kilkelly's nine suggestions were the characters who were ultimately killed as part of the anniversary episodes: Finn, who Kilkelly noted had not been punished for his various crimes due to his amnesia, and whose reintroduction as a regular character the previous year had been controversial with fans; Prue, who was deemed as "the type to put herself into dangerous situations", and whose death would conveniently explain her absence in her daughter's life in the future; and Gary, who Kilkelly viewed as a character whose storylines had become "samey" and would make financial sense to cut from the series. Kilkelly's other suggestions were Elly, whose exit from the series had recently been announced; Zenin Alexio (Axle Whitehead), viewed as a "dispensable guest character", who ultimately left the series prior to the anniversary episodes; Kyle, with Kilkelly noting that Milligan had been "suspiciously tight-lipped" when asked how long his 2019 return was due to last; Mark, due to McGregor's insistence that the character would not appear again; Ned, who Kilkelly described as "cursed"; and Clive, whose death Kilkelly noted would have a significant impact while avoiding the loss of a regular cast member.

== Reception ==
In Australia the average rating for the regular episodes (Part 1) was 142,200 viewer with the peak on viewing on Thursday at 159,000 viewers. In the UK, the show failed to make the top 15 viewed episodes for that week.

Daniel Kilkelly called the drama a "game-changer", praising the fact that the deaths would have a long lasting impact on the show. Stephen Patterson described the week as being full of "love, laughter, tears, terror and all round unmissable drama" while noting that viewers could have many questions needing to be answered.

Rose Hill of The Mirror described Gary's death as "brutal", Finn as a "cold-blooded killer" and speculated how far Finn was going to go to cover his tracks during the next episode.

Denise van Outen, who played Prue Wallace, praised the show for the "dramatic" nature of her character's death and told Digital Spy that she "wanted people to talk about it", while also hinting that Prue may still have survived as Neighbours' bosses had not ruled out a return for her.

Colette Mann and Chris Milligan, who play Sheila and Kyle Canning respectively, particularly praised Damien Richardson for his work on the show after his final scenes aired and wished him the best of luck for the future.

Daniel Kilkelly of Digital Spy reflected upon the events of the Endgame episodes, noting that Finn's drama would have a long lasting impact on Ramsay Street's residents. Kilkelly praised the immediate aftermath of the episodes managing to keep key characters on-screen, positively comparing this to EastEnders' own recent 35th anniversary period. Although considering Elly's behaviour after Finn's death as a contrivance to contribute to her incrimination in his death, Kilkelly looked forward to the continuing storyline in anticipation of Anasta's imminent departure from the series. He also praised the initial explorations of the grief and guilt of multiple characters following Finn's actions, and the continued role of Mark and Sky in the coming episodes.

A reporter from Herald Sun branded the two-hander between Finn and Susan as "gritty". Katie Baillie writing for Metro called it a "very special two-hander episode". Joe Julians of Radio Times named it "one of the most dramatic episodes the show has ever seen."
