= Harlow Robinson (Neighbours) =

Fictional character from the Australian soap opera Neighbours

- Neighbours character
- Portrayed by: Jemma Donovan
- Duration: 2019–2022
- First appearance: 15 July 2019
- Last appearance: 6 July 2022
- Introduced by: Jason Herbison
- Spin-off appearances: Neighbours: Erinsborough High (2019)
In-universe information
- Occupation: Student; Lassiters Hotel employee; Executive assistant
- Family: Robinson
- Father: Robert Robinson
- Mother: Prudence Wallace
- Grandfathers: Paul Robinson
- Grandmothers: Gail Robinson; Terese Willis (step)
- Uncles: David Tanaka; Leo Tanaka
- Aunts: Harriet Wallace; Amy Williams
- First cousins: Jimmy Williams; Isla Tanaka-Brennan; Abigail Tanaka
- Other relatives: Lucy Robinson; Glen Donnelly; Kiri Durant

Harlow Robinson is a fictional character from the Australian soap opera Neighbours, played by Jemma Donovan. Harlow is introduced as an extension of the Robinson family, the secret daughter of Robert Robinson (Adam Hunter) and the granddaughter of Paul Robinson (Stefan Dennis). Donovan is also the real life daughter of Jason Donovan, who played Harlow's great uncle, Scott. Donovan auditioned for the role after a four-year break from acting and successfully got the role of Harlow, which producers then slightly tweaked to suit her. Donovan's casting announcement was made in March when she began filming, and she debuted on screens on 15 July 2019. Harlow is described as head strong, sensible and clever, and Donovan revealed that she liked her character. Donovan's co-star, Dennis, also explained that the character had some reservations about her new secret family initially. Harlow's early storylines involve a feud with Roxy Willis (Zima Anderson) and a reunion with her mother, Prudence Wallace (Denise van Outen). Harlow's introduction was described as similar to Donovan's story of moving from London to Melbourne.

Producers soon established a romantic relationship between Harlow and her neighbour, Hendrix Greyson (Ben Turland), a storyline that originally began to explore consent, before the characters develop feelings for each other. Harlow and Hendrix date for a number of months and writers explored romantic scenes between the couple in March 2020. However, Harlow soon becomes annoyed with Hendrix's immaturity and breaks up with him. Both Donovan and Turland explained that they were upset with their characters' relationship coming to an end. Harlow and Brent Colefax (Texas Watterson) begin dating when Harlow's strong friendship with him reaches new levels and she leans in for the first kiss. Donovan explained that their relationship was a surprise to her and that Harlow was originally worried to pursue a relationship with Brent, but later realised her true feelings for him. Producers use this to explore a long-distance relationship, which Harlow and Brent keep secret. When Brent returns to find that Harlow's behaviour is changing for the worse, he breaks up with her. Watterson explained that Brent is now seeing Harlow as a mini Paul.

A mental health storyline was written that saw Harlow's behaviour change for the worse and one journalist said that Harlow would be showing her uncharacteristically ruthless side. Harlow sabotages Chloe Brennan's (April Rose Pengilly) job and has a lack of compassion towards her neighbours and friends. Donovan said that Harlow was smug with her actions and was excited to see others being vandalised. Some of her friends worry that Harlow may be becoming psychopathic, but Harlow is ultimately diagnosed with compassion fatigue and mends her attitude. Producers used the plot to lead into a new storyline, as Harlow confides in Ned Willis (Ben Hall) and develops romantic feelings for him in a lengthy build-up. The two kiss, before Ned's affair with Harlow against his girlfriend is exposed. On 17 May 2022, it was announced Donovan had finished filming and her final scenes aired on 6 July.

== Creation and casting ==
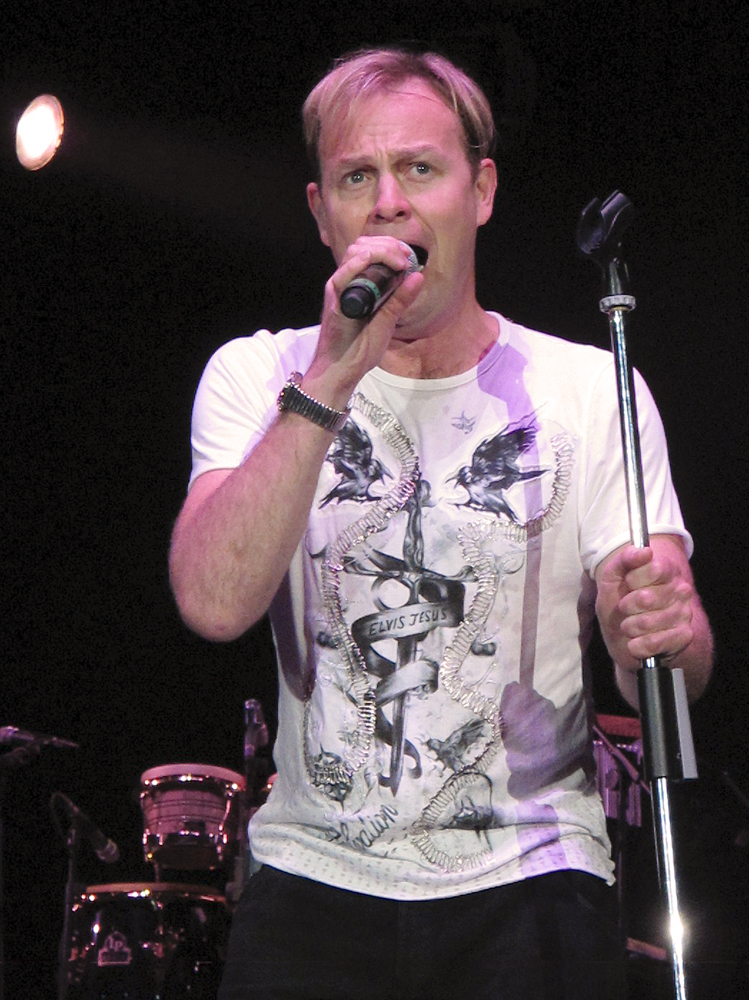
Jemma Donovan's father, Jason, acted on the serial from 1986 to 1989 as Scott Robinson.

Harlow is introduced as the secret daughter of Robert Robinson (Adam Hunter) and the granddaughter of Paul Robinson (Stefan Dennis). Donovan's casting as the newly created character was announced on the serial's social media on 26 March 2019. The serial said online, "A third generation of Donovans is heading to Erinsborough! We're over the moon to reveal that Jemma Donovan, daughter of Neighbours legend Jason (Scott Robinson) and granddaughter of patriarch Terence (Doug Willis) will join the cast as Harlow Robinson – appearing on screen in July. Jemma has been acting since age 11 and after taking a break to complete her education, the 19-year-old returns with a role in the show." The role was slightly tweaked for Donovan and Harlow's story is described as similar to Donovan's own story of moving from the UK to Australia.

Neighbours executive producer, Jason Herbison, said of Donovan's audition, "Jemma did a fantastic audition for Neighbours and her pedigree was an unexpected surprise." He continued, "Jason and Terence are Ramsay Street royalty and it warms all our hearts to know there will be a third generation Donovan on the show. I'm excited to see Jemma carry the torch and make the character of Harlow her own." Donovan said of her casting, "I was so happy and very honoured to be a part of a series which has been enjoyed by generations. The timing was also perfect because since my previous role on Spotless in 2015, I stopped going to auditions and acting because I wanted to finish my schooling, get my A-levels, and see what I wanted to do after that. So it's great how everything has fallen into place." Donovan's father, Jason, called Jemma's new role an "incredible learning curve." He said, "This is Jemma's moment. My dad had a wonderful few years and I'm sure Jemma will also embrace the experience and honour the past. She needs to look forward, be an open book, learn from her experiences and have some fun. What an opportunity!"

It was later revealed that Donovan has originally auditioned for Roxy Willis, but the role "didn't feel right for her but it all worked out in the end." The role would later be assumed by Zima Anderson. Donovan continued, "I auditioned for Home and Away. I auditioned for Neighbours. I went and saw a few casting directors. It was so fortunate that it just happened at that time and – I actually auditioned for Zima's role, interestingly enough. I auditioned for Roxy, and I remember getting the scripts and I was like, 'Gosh, Neighbours is getting raunchy!' I was like, 'Oh my god, this 18-year-old, I don't know if I can play this!' Seeing my dad had done Neighbours, and my auntie, and my granddad, they all said once they'd given me this audition, they were like, 'This is the best thing you'll do in terms of acting in such a short period of time. You learn so much. You meet so many amazing people, talented people'. They just said this is definitely the best way to start out. Nobody else can give you that opportunity that Neighbours can."

== Development ==
=== Characterisation and introduction ===
Harlow's arrival coincides with Robert's return storyline. The character made her first appearance on 15 July 2019. Paul and his son, David Tanaka (Takaya Honda), meet Harlow in the waiting room of the prison that Robert is being held in and Harlow reveals her identity, then explains that Robert met his mother, Prudence Wallace (Denise van Outen), whilst backpacking in Tasmania. Harlow explains that she has not met her father, but writes to him from London. Donovan said, "I really like my character Harlow. She is very head strong, and I enjoy playing that type of character who knows what she is doing and likes to get involved and Harlow seems to have those qualities." Dennis explained, "In comes this girl blaming them for being the reason she now can't see her father – Paul had no idea Robert even had a kid! It emerges Robert met a British backpacker called Prudence almost 20 years ago when she was travelling in Tasmania. They had a fling and Harlow was the result. She has had nothing to do with her father but stated writing to him and came to Australia so they could meet. Paul then brings Harlow under the wing of the family and she moves in with him and Terese [(Rebekah Elmaloglou)] back in Ramsay Street." Dennis also described Harlow as "a very sound, sensible and clever girl." Harlow's introductory storylines involved reconciliation with her mother and a feud with her housemate, Roxy Willis. Dennis said, "Harlow is the complete opposite to Roxy, they completely clash and the dynamic is fantastic! It takes a while for Terese to convince Paul to embrace Harlow because of the links to Robert, then they end up sharing the house with two squabbling teenagers!" The storyline ultimately results in a "sensational" food fight between Harlow and Roxy, a storyline leaked by Dennis. Dennis also added, "We have some very comical moments coming up. Considering her dad is a baddie there's no dark side pointed to yet with Harlow, but it's a soap so anything could happen! Paul will side with Harlow more than Roxy at first because she is blood."

=== Relationship with Hendrix Greyson ===
At the Erinsborough High School ball in September 2019, writers established a consent storyline involving Harlow and Hendrix Greyson (Ben Turland), in which Hendrix forces a kiss upon Harlow, who then slaps Hendrix back. Over the next few months, the serial gave hints to a future romance between Harlow and Hendrix, as the two begin to develop crushes on each other. The serial "explores chemistry" between the two characters in the first term of the school year. Harlow watches Hendrix do one-arm push-ups shirtless in the school corridor and stares "at her neighbour's bare chest and is shaken by her own feelings for him." Harlow then admits that she likes him, but is "hardly a fan of his personality." After Hendrix pulls the same "stunt" again and Harlow is comforted by Hendrix when she is upset with her mother, their feelings "escalate" and they spend an entire evening at The Waterhole making "weird eye contact", but remain shy of their feelings. However, when Harlow turns to Hendrix for comfort following the discovery of unpleasant information about her mum, Harlow and Hendrix "give into temptation" and kiss. The pair begin dating shortly after. In March 2020, during Neighbours' 35th anniversary celebrations, producers decided to write the couple some "romantic scenes." When Harlow discovers that her mother did not leave her cult voluntarily, Harlow and Hendrix escape from Erinsborough to Hendrix's father's island, where other Ramsay Street residents are camping. Harlow and Hendrix camp out separately as they attempt to find the rest of the group and Hendrix comforts Harlow, who is upset with her mother. Kilkelly said that the scenes would see the pair almost go "all the way", however will feature Harlow soon become nervous and run off. The storyline also leads to "big danger", when Harlow encounters Finn Kelly (Rob Mills) and is pushed down a mineshaft with Bea Nilsson (Bonnie Anderson). Harlow and Bea quickly become trapped with a snake, which bites Harlow on the leg. This sparked fears that Harlow would be killed off as one of the 35th anniversary's three deaths. Ahead of the scenes airing, Kilkelly described that the "situation turns potentially deadly." However, both are saved and Harlow is reunited with Hendrix.

Writers ensured that the couple would encounter many roadblocks throughout their relationship. In November 2020, Johnathon Hughes of Radio Times revealed that Harlow would be experiencing stress at school and that Hendrix would steal exam papers and send them to Harlow in an attempt to help her. Hughes described it as Harlow's future being "in ruins thanks to her boyfriend" and revealed that Harlow would be implicated for the situation. This leaves Harlow to explain herself and convince others that it was not her fault. Four months later, Hendrix becomes involved in an illegal gambling ring and member Natasha Leighton (Sam Healy) forces her wrath upon Harlow by kidnapping her after Hendrix busts the ring. In the aftermath, Harlow is "shaken" and "torn" on what to do, but thinks it would be "best to end the relationship, leaving Hendrix heartbroken." Although Hendrix attempts to impress Harlow, she doesn't think it would be good to rekindle their relationship. Turland told Daniel Kilkelly of Digital Spy, "My honest reaction is that I was quite upset! I do enjoy the relationship between Hendrix and Harlow. We've had a lot of fun building that up ever since I started in the show, as there's always been a chemistry there." Turland continued, "It was upsetting because it was such a familiarity on set and it turned into a beautiful relationship. But it was also exciting to work with Jemma on this storyline. I think Neighbours viewers have learned to love the relationship, so it'll come as a bit of a shock to people. I don't think they'll be too happy to start with. But there's not much you can do to come back from Hendrix's behaviour. He has stuffed up quite a bit, so it's quite reasonable for Harlow to pull the pin. I'm keen to see how people react as the break-up scene was quite upsetting." He also gave hints to a possible reunion of the pair, saying, "Harlow has become a huge part of Hendrix's life and a huge part of his choices. He chose to stay in Erinsborough and not go with his dad because of Harlow, so he truly loves her and will always have a soft spot for her. I think there's definitely potential for a reunion." Donovan also revealed that she was "sad" to see the relationship come to an end, but would "definitely" remain "open-minded" about Harlow's future relationships.

=== Relationship with Brent Colefax ===
Harlow develops a friendship with Brent Colefax (Texas Watterson), much to the disapproval of Hendrix and Paul. Hendrix tries to ally with Paul to "drive Brent out of Erinsborough", which leaves Harlow "furious" with Hendrix. Harlow and Brent subsequently move closer together and Harlow "leans in for a kiss, which surprises Brent." Harlow becomes blushed and quickly runs off, and her emotions are described as being "unsure whether to pursue a relationship with Brent or to simply remain friends." Donovan explained, "She kisses him impulsively and she suddenly freaks that she isn't ready and then pulls back. She questions herself, is this really what she wants?" Jess Lee of Digital Spy called the situation "complicated" for both parties, however Harlow eventually confesses her feelings to him and they begin dating. Donovan later admitted to Digital Spy that she initially found the kiss a "surprise" and that the storyline was designed by her and the producers. She explained that she "spent a bit of time with the writers and producers talking it through and making sure the story is told appropriately and truthfully." When asked if she feels Harlow is more forgiving of Brent than Hendrix, Donovan said, "I think there was a genuine want for change from Brent and it was shown through his actions. For Harlow, that was promising and could also see that he wanted to do good and move forward." Donovan also responded to the "conundrum" between Brent and Hendrix, trying to choose who suits Harlow more, "Either way would be cool, but it would also be interesting to explore other relationships."

However, when Brent becomes involved in a robbery ring, he is sent to work in the Australian Defence Force, and Harlow and Brent decide to pursue a secret long-distance relationship. To distract her grandfather from the truth, Harlow goes on a fake date with Jesse Porter (Cameron Robbie). Although Harlow stays in contact with Brent, her attitude with her neighbours changes radically and she becomes short and "ruthless" with many of her friends. Watterson described Harlow as being "pretty much Paul!" Watterson reprised his role as Brent in October in a storyline that sees Brent break up with Harlow. Watterson explained to Digital Spy, "He's come back to Erinsborough to see everybody – especially Harlow. Harlow is the main person he definitely wants to see. But later on, he realises that she's a completely different person. Harlow hasn't mentioned anything about Chloe and their recent clashes, so Brent thinks everything is fine. It's only when he comes home that Harlow blurts out everything that has happened. He's confused about why she hasn't said anything to him." He elaborated, "She's lying to Terese and everyone around her. She has started scheming, so Brent comes in and sees that. Brent is totally shocked. He's not expecting any of it. That's when he has to take a step back and reconsider his relationship with Harlow, even though it crushes him." Of Brent breaking up with Harlow, Watterson said, "It's a massive choice for him to make. He's not there for long as well, so he's got to figure that out within a couple of days. I feel like they're both on different levels and Brent has to do what's good for him, for the first time ever. Brent just has to end it." Watterson also explained Harlow's reaction to the news outlet and said, "She's really confused. She doesn't show him any sympathy, because she's very upset and broken and doesn't believe that Brent has done the right thing. That's fair enough from her perspective, but she acts out, gives him the cold shoulder and doesn't want to talk to him." Donovan also explained Harlow's point of view, "I think they've gone different paths. I think Brent needs to sort himself out, she needs to sort herself out. I don't think she's in a place where she should be with someone anyway. She is upset and it does bring a bit of 'human' back to the character, having that. It's an interesting one, but I do think it plays out quite nicely and it's a great storyline to tell. She does need to be on her own, sort herself out, and figure out what she wants to do and how she wants to go about things, especially in her headspace at the moment."

=== Compassion fatigue ===
Harlow's behaviour becomes radicalised during her relationship with Brent, which leads to their break-up, and she continues being rude to others after their separation. Paul promotes Harlow to the newly created role of executive liaison at Lassiters, which upsets Terese, Chloe Brennan (April Rose Pengilly) and the staff, who go on strike and call the promotion an act of nepotism. Harlow is eventually demoted and discovers that Chloe, other managers and staff receive free drinks after work, a fact which is unaware to owners Terese and Paul. Harlow "contemplates using it to her own advantage to get ahead", but eventually decides to keep it to herself and take free drinks. Harlow later becomes Chloe's executive assistant and purposefully sabotages her work by hiring Mick Allsop (Joel Creasey), who had previously caused strife for Chloe, Chloe's brother and the hotel. Pengilly explained, "When Mick arrives, Chloe realises something has gone awry. She knows that Harlow saw her pile of 'yes' and 'no' candidates in the office and was left alone with them. Given Harlow's animosity towards her, she could have easily switched them." Harlow also edits Chloe's roster maliciously. Donovan explained, "Harlow is feeling pretty smug. If she continues to deny it, she believes no-one will be able to prove otherwise. [Harlow] feels [Chloe] deserves it. She's hoping it will bring Chloe down a notch or two and make her look as if she can't do her job." She also said that Harlow "can't wait to see the fallout." Harlow "brazenly" denies hiring Mick. Mackenzie Hargreaves (Georgie Stone) also takes notice of Harlow's lack of compassion towards Kyle Canning (Chris Milligan), who has just been diagnosed with cancer. Harlow is described as "negative and demanding", and Jess Lee described Harlow as displaying "an uncharacteristically ruthless side more associated with her grandfather than herself." Katie Baillie of Metro called it a "psychopathic lack of empathy." Roxy begins to believe that Harlow is becoming a psychopath like her father, but David suggests it to be compassion fatigue and works with Harlow to mend her behaviour.

=== Crush on Ned Willis ===
Harlow confides in Ned Willis (Ben Hall) over her compassion fatigue and the two strike a strong bond and start spending a lot of time with each other. Whilst on the River Bend Getaway trip, Harlow and Ned get lost in the forest and huddle for warmth at night. The next day, the pair find a waterfall and pond, where they swim in the water together and kiss. Lee explained the storyline as "Ned and Harlow end up at a waterfall, where things get steamy. They end up kissing and hooking up..." Ned's ex-girlfriend, Amy Greenwood (Jacinta Stapleton), finds them after they quickly get changed and Amy requests they begin dating again. Harlow tries to stop Ned from agreeing, but it does not work and Ned and Amy, still unaware of their kiss, begin dating once more. Harlow goes back home in embarrassment in scenes filmed in London, which Donovan called "tricky." She explained, "It was tricky, I think. It's hard when you haven't really had any scripts. I obviously was briefed on what happens, but because Neighbours works at such a quick pace, it can change. You kind of have to go in there and imagine what would have happened with everything you've been given in terms of information. It's also hard to envision the scenes that happened before – why she feels so flustered, without properly having filmed it. But that's the fun and games of this show – it's very much like that, so you just have to do what you do." Of running away from Ned, Donovan said, "Yeah, I think she just needs to step out of Erinsborough for a little bit and see people who aren't on the Street and figure out what she wants to do. Whenever you come home, you get time to think about what's going on in your life. I think she really needed that and she gets to see her aunt as well, who's probably the closest thing she has to her mum. I think she probably just needed to get out of Erinsborough for a second." Ned admits that he has feelings for Harlow and Amy, who senses something off, attempts to make friends with Harlow, which only "increases the sense of awkwardness between Ned and Harlow." Ned tells Harlow that he will break up with Amy after her Fashion Week show is finished, however during the show, in which Harlow is a model for, Corey Smythe-Jones (Laurence Boxhall) projects "damning" images of Harlow and Ned kissing on Harlow's white dress. Corey also vandalises Amy's van and frames Harlow, whilst Amy breaks up with Ned, who leaves Erinsborough shortly after.

=== Departure ===
On 17 May 2022, Sam Warner and Daniel Kilkelly of Digital Spy announced that a Neighbours spokesperson had confirmed that Donovan had left the serial and had filmed her final scenes. Donovan stated on Instagram, "Melbourne, I love you. It's been so special. Until next time." Many of her co-stars wished her goodbye in the comments of her farewell post. Donovan's final scenes will air in July, before the serial's finale. It was later confirmed that Harlow's departure storyline would involve her moving back to London to be with her aunt, Harriet (Amanda Holden), after giving a "bittersweet" farewell to her friends. Donovan's final scenes aired on 6 July 2022. In an interview, Donovan reflected on her time as playing Harlow and said that she would miss the cast and crew, which she had "made friends for life" with. She joked about the fact that Harlow had been kidnapped numerous times, but went on to praise the serial for allowing her to grow as an actor and give her the experience. Although it was initially reported by Mediaweek that Donovan had returned for the serial's finale, she was only featured in old photos during the ending credits.

== Storylines ==
As Harlow waits inside the prison where her father, Robert Robinson is being held, she meets David Tanaka and Aaron Brennan (Matt Wilson), who are also waiting to see Robert. They do not get a chance to talk to Robert, who leaves when his father Paul Robinson enters the room. Harlow tells David, Aaron and Paul that she is Robert's daughter, and that her mother met him while backpacking in Tasmania. They invite her to stay with them in Erinsborough. Paul introduces Harlow to his fiancée, Terese Willis, who she instantly bonds with, and invites her to live with them, after she says she wants to get to know Paul for herself. Paul initially struggles to talk to Harlow about Robert, but he eventually gives her a letter he wrote to his son that explains their relationship. Terese's niece, Roxy Willis, takes an instant dislike to Harlow and the two girls struggle to get along. Harlow enrols at Erinsborough High and befriends Yashvi Rebecchi (Olivia Junkeer). After Paul is attacked, Roxy claims that Gary Canning (Damien Richardson) is responsible. Harlow notices that Gary's mother Sheila Canning (Colette Mann) is nervous and soon finds that she has hidden a bloodied crowbar in her recycling bin. Harlow hands it into the police, who arrest Sheila. Roxy soon confesses that her former boyfriend attacked Paul. Harlow later calls out Roxy's immature behaviour when she realises Roxy has not apologised to Gary.

Terese gives Harlow and Roxy the use of her daughter's car, Hermione, causing them to clash again when Roxy gives it a make-over. After Roxy tries on Terese's wedding dress and rips it, Harlow tells Terese what happened, but is surprised when Terese accepts that it was just an accident. When Roxy confronts her for telling Terese, Harlow throws food at her and they fight. They are interrupted by the arrival of Harlow's grandmother, Gail Lewis (Fiona Corke). Gail plans to take Harlow to Tasmania with her, after seeing how bad the relationship between her and Roxy is. She changes her mind when she learns that Harlow is doing well in school and wants to stay in Erinsborough. Harlow discovers Roxy has a casual relationship with Mark Brennan (Scott McGregor) and blackmails Roxy into doing her chores and giving her custody of the car. She also learns that Gail was involved in a conspiracy against Paul and encourages Gail to go and be with her daughter New York. She later tells Ned Willis that she thought Gail came to Erinsborough to get to know her. Ned encourages her to say goodbye to Gail properly. While Terese and Paul are honeymooning in London, they decide to meet Harlow's mother, Prue Wallace. Harlow tries to put them off and tells Amy Williams (Zoe Cramond) that Prue is in a cult. After Mark publicly humiliates Roxy, Harlow and Sheila encourage her to end the relationship, which she does.

Harlow repeatedly clashes with Hendrix Greyson, who attempts to sabotage her presentation at school. During the school dance, Harlow confronts Hendrix for kissing Olivia Lane (Grace O'Sullivan) in front of his date, Mackenzie Hargreaves. Olivia accuses Harlow for being jealous, and Hendrix kisses her. She then slaps him. During a Melbourne Cup event at Lassiters, Harlow is injured when Hendrix crashes into a marquee, trapping her inside. Roxy frees her and Harlow thanks her for caring. She refuses to accept Hendrix's half-hearted apology. Days later, Harlow and Roxy find the Melbourne Cup trophy in the boot of their car. After taking some photos with it, they bring it back to Terese, who initially accuses Roxy of taking it, however, Harlow believes it was Hendrix and CCTV confirms he was responsible. When David needs a kidney transplant, Harlow decides to ask Robert to get tested, which Paul opposes. Robert is a match and he agrees to donate his kidney. He later escapes from the hospital and calls Harlow to meet him. He tries to persuade her to leave town with him, but she refuses and convinces him to return to the hospital and save David. Harlow decides to study psychology and she asks former school teacher Finn Kelly to tutor her.

Harlow develops a crush on Hendrix, which he soon notices. He shows up to her home shirtless and tries to seduce her in a classroom in order to get her to admit it. Harlow denies liking him. While practising her driving lessons with Terese, Harlow accidentally hits and kills Clementine, a cat that Hendrix had grown fond of. He accuses Harlow of killing Clementine deliberately, knowing that she was allergic to her. Harlow holds a funeral for Clementine and invites Hendrix to say goodbye. He apologises to Harlow for being harsh and they almost kiss. Harlow overhears Paul and Gary arguing about Prue returning to Erinsborough and she is angry that Gary did not tell her. Hendrix comforts Harlow and they share a kiss. When Prue arrives, Harlow struggles to trust her, but she attends a welcome barbecue with Paul and Terese. There, Gary and Pure announce they are engaged. Harlow and Gary's son, Kyle Canning, are opposed to the engagement and the wedding, which is happening at the Lassiter's Wedding Expo. Harlow and Hendrix talk about their kiss and she gently rejects him, preferring them to stay frenemies, which he accepts. Hendrix later tells her that he wants to earn her trust and asks her out on a date, which is a success. Prue convinces Harlow to be there at her wedding, but while planning the hen party, Harlow discovers an email from the Restoration Order to her mother and she realises that Prue lied about leaving the Order. She confronts Prue, before being comforted by Hendrix.

Harlow and Hendrix decide to travel to his father, Pierce Greyson's (Tim Robards) island in secret, where some of their friends and neighbours have gathered for Elly Conway's (Jodi Anasta) birthday. They tell Paul and Terese that they are staying with friends, and set up camp away from the others. Harlow sends Gary a text message about Prue's lies. Harlow feels pressured to have sex by Hendrix and they argue. She leaves and comes across Bea Nilsson, who is trapped in a mineshaft with a broken leg. Harlow jumps down to help, but she also becomes trapped. Finn returns to check if Bea is still alive and finds Harlow with her. He throws several rocks at them and then drops a snake down, which bites Harlow when she and Bea try to catch it in a rucksack. Gary finds them and attempts to rescue them, but he is killed by Finn, who later pushes Elly into the mineshaft. The others eventually find them and are forced to jump into the mineshaft to escape a fire that engulfs the island. After being rescued, Harlow is taken to Erinsborough Hospital and placed in an induced coma. Shortly after she wakes up, Harlow listens to a voicemail from Prue that ends with an explosion. Paul tells her that Prue is dead, having been killed by a bomb that Finn had left for Paul's sister Lucy Robinson (Melissa Bell). Harlow repeatedly listens to Prue's voicemail, and is devastated when Paul accidentally deletes the message. Mark Brennan (Scott McGregor) tells Harlow that the police have a copy of the message that she have when the investigation is over.

Roxy hosts a memorial party for Prue, and later that night, Harlow and Hendrix have sex. Harlow tells Terese and Roxy about her night with Hendrix, which Paul overhears. He accuses Hendrix of taking advantage of Harlow, and she assures Hendrix that she didn't regret it and apologise to him for Paul's behaviour. Her relationship with Paul is strained. After getting some advice from David, Harlow apologises to Paul and they reconcile, until she learns Paul tried to make Aaron hide stolen goods. Harlow moves in with Hendrix and his family after Paul brings up her grief for Prue in front of Pierce and Chloe Brennan. Paul begs her to move back home, but she refuses and deems him untrustworthy. They later apologise to each other, and Paul allows her to stay over with Hendrix for two nights a week and accompanies her to a gynaecology appointment for a contraceptive implant. While setting up for Mackenzie's 18th birthday party, Hendrix tells Harlow that he will be partying in clubs once he graduates, which leads Harlow to worry that he might lose interest in her. Harlow tries to impress Hendrix by being cool and admits that she does not want lose him, as she already lost Prue. Hendrix tells her not to worry, as he likes her for who she is. Harlow befriends Aaron and David's foster child Emmett Donaldson (Ezra Justin). She later witnesses Paul blaming Emmett's brother, Brent Colefax, for causing Emmett's back injury, after he falls from a roof. She apologises to him for Paul's behaviour. Harlow offers advice to Brent when he has problems with Aaron and David, and he asks her out on a date. When she turns him down, Brent becomes aggressive and Harlow has to shout at him to leave. She later tells Aaron and David about Brent's behaviour towards her and they ask him to leave.

Harlow supports Hendrix after Pierce and Chloe's marriage begins to fall apart. Hendrix later discovers that Pierce has been having an affair with their neighbour, Dipi Rebecchi (Sharon Johal), and he goes to Harlow for comfort. Harlow also later discovers that Paul knew about this and blackmailed Pierce into selling his share in Lassiters back to him, and is appalled by his initial lack of remorse. She also falls out with Hendrix after he reveals that he gave Pierce an unnecessary medication and his attitude towards Mackenzie being upset one day, so she refuses to go to Schoolies' with him. They reconcile, however, upon his return and Harlow encourages Hendrix to make up with Pierce and move in to Number 28 when Pierce decides to leave town. A few months pass by and Harlow begins rejecting Hendrix's immaturity, so she breaks up with him. Harlow then begins to give a recently returned Brent Colefax school advice and Brent falls for her, causing Hendrix to become jealous. Brent eventually gives a gift to Harlow and they kiss, then start dating each other secretly. When Paul finds out, Brent tells him that they are going to stay together no matter what, so Paul and Holden Brice (Toby Derrick) frame Brent and he is sent off to the Australian Defence Force to avoid going to prison. Harlow continues dating Brent in a long-distance relationship and pretends to date Jesse Porter to avoid Paul's wrath. Roxy spots Jesse going on a date and tells Harlow, who rudely brushes it off.

Harlow's behaviour begins radically changing and she becomes rude to the people around her. Mackenzie hangs out with Harlow, who speaks about herself the entire time and complains about everyone. Harlow and Brent's relationship is exposed when he returns to Erinsborough, and so is Paul's scheme. Harlow explains that she is not angry at Paul and Brent, who has been hearing about Harlow's changes from her friends, breaks up with her after saying that she is a different person. Her friends try to comfort her, but she pushes them away and continues to act rudely to the people around her. Paul's brother, Glen Donnelly (Richard Huggett), arrives and begins spending a lot of time with Terese, whose marriage with Paul is breaking down. Harlow becomes suspicious of him and snoops through his hotel room, where Glen is secretly hiding Terese and Paul's wedding ring. Harlow hires private investigator John Wong (Harry Tseng) to look into Glen's background and when Harlow receives John's report, she confronts a drunken Terese on the top of Lassiter's roof. Harlow and Terese argue and the report get blown off the roof, causing Harlow to leave. Terese then trips and falls over the side of the roof, which she manages to cling onto. Paul saves her and takes his anger out on Harlow. John later tells Harlow that Glen only has parking fines on his record, but Harlow remains suspicious. Roxy and Mackenzie theorise that Harlow is turning into a psychopath like her father, but David states he believes it is compassion fatigue. Roxy brings a muffin into work for Harlow to try and ask her to be one of her bridesmaids, but Harlow interrupts her and begins complaining about Glen, so Roxy asks Mackenzie instead. After Harlow finds out, she yells at Roxy, then states that they are no longer family. Roxy uninvites Harlow to the wedding, but Harlow attends anyway and Roxy is glad. Harlow later becomes closer to Terese's stepson, Ned Willis (Ben Hall) and they both go on a road trip with David, Aaron, Nicolette Stone (Charlotte Chimes), Levi Canning (Richie Morris) and Freya Wozniak (Phoebe Roberts).

After spending a few days, Ned and Harlow realise Levi and Freya are missing, and the group split up to search for them, only for Ned and Harlow to get themselves lost in the bushes, and unable to call for help, due to no phone service. They spend the night in the bushes and running out of supplies. The next day, they stubble upon a waterfall and went for a swim. They share a kiss and have sex by the waterfall. They are later found by Ned's ex-girlfriend, Amy Greenwood and return to Erinsborough. However, Ned and Harlow are unsure about their moment as Ned tries to work things out with Amy. Eventually, Ned and Amy got back together, leaving Harlow jealous. Harlow leaves for London to spend time away from Erinsborough and meets Corey Smythe-Jones. They become romantically involved with each other, but Harlow breaks it off after consideration, however they remain close friends. Corey comes back to Erinsborough with her and they spend time with each other. It is revealed Corey is part of Prue's cult is attempting to recruit Harlow. At the Lassiters Fashion Week, he projects an image of Harlow and Ned kissing on Harlow's white dress, leading to Ned and Amy's break-up. Harlow is drugged and kidnapped by Corey, but Levi and David find her stuck in a rural petrol station and rescue her. Corey goes on the run and kidnaps Amy's daughter, Zara Selwyn (Freya Van Dike). When he is found and arrested, Harlow tells him she hopes he rots in hell. Harlow says her goodbyes to her family and friends at Hendrix's funeral, then leaves for London to live with her aunt.

== Reception ==
Ahead of her introduction, Tina Burke of Now to Love said, "We can't wait to meet Harlow Robinson" and called Donovan's casting a continuation of the "Donovan family legacy." Dennis confirmed that he was informed of Donovan's casting via her father, Jason. Dennis recalled, "He told me Jemma was joining the show and he told me to look after! I promised him I would so am making sure she's alright. We try and welcome the newcomers so they feel part of the family as quickly as we can." Elmaloglou told Radio Times, "Jemma is divine and it's great she's practically Ramsay Street royalty being Jason's daughter." During Harlow's compassion fatigue storyline, Katie Baillie questioned, "Is her dad teaching her his evil ways? Is Harlow in training to become the new killer of Ramsay Street?" A fan poll run by Back to the Bay on 23 December 2021 found Harlow as the 20th most popular character in Neighbours. The outlet said, "You'd think that the granddaughter of a manipulative businessman and the daughter of a murderous psychopath would turn out to be a bit of a rebel. But, when a previously unknown Harlow Robinson arrived on the street, she was the model student and citizen, and that's how she's stayed for most of her tenure. More recently, she's got a bit more of a bite to her, and her own psychopathic tendencies are being questioned. Did we also mention her mum was a pedantic cult follower? The last time we saw Harlow, she was harassing Terese on the roof of Lassiters, moments before the hotel manager found herself hanging off the edge of the building. Did she slip, or did Harlow push her?" They summarised the character by saying, "Whether it's her sweet goody-two-shoes side that fans love, or the ruthless woman searching for a quick ascension up the Lassiters ranks, the newest member of the Robinson clan has made a good impression on Neighbours fans, and she just sneaks into the top 20." Donovan's co-star, Morris, said that Harlow "is, morally speaking, true to herself".
