= Bea Nilsson =

- Neighbours character
- Portrayed by: Bonnie Anderson
- Duration: 2018–2023
- First appearance: 18 May 2018
- Last appearance: 14 November 2023
- Introduced by: Jason Herbison
In-universe information
- Other names: Beatrix Nilsson
- Occupation: Mechanic; Singer
- Father: Lars Nilsson
- Mother: Liz Conway
- Half-sisters: Elly Conway
- Aunts: Susan Kennedy
- Nieces: Aster Conway

Bea Nilsson is a fictional character from the Australian television soap opera Neighbours, played by singer-songwriter Bonnie Anderson. Anderson had auditioned for the serial numerous times, and after impressing producers, they created the role of Beatrix "Bea" Nilsson just for her. She was given a two-year contract and she began filming in February 2018. Bea marks Anderson's first major acting role and she called it "the best thing" that had ever happened to her. She made her first appearance during the episode broadcast on 18 May 2018. The character was introduced as the estranged half-sister of Elly Conway (Jodi Anasta) and niece of Susan Kennedy (Jackie Woodburne).

Bea is characterised as fierce, strong, and independent. She keeps her guard up and hides behind a "tough exterior". However, she is loyal and willing to do anything to protect her loved ones. Anderson liked that her character had "rough edges", but thought there was also an innocence about her. She was also surprised by the positive response to Bea's early scenes as the character was "quite bitchy". It emerges through her early scenes that Bea fought with Elly and then spent five years living on the streets. Anderson hoped that the sisters would be able to rebuild their relationship. Her singing career was later incorporated into the show, as Bea is shown to be a singer-songwriter. Anderson released her track "Sorry" via Bea's storyline.

The character's introduction and early storylines were intertwined with the return of villain Finn Kelly (Rob Mills), who manipulates and uses her to gain revenge on those he feels have wronged him, including Elly and Susan. Anderson felt sorry for her character because she had loved Finn. Bea and Elly's relationship remains strained in the aftermath, which allows their mother Liz Conway (Debra Lawrance), whom Anderson branded selfish, to play them off against one another. Liz's introduction also helps explore Bea's fictional backstory further, as it emerges that Liz wanted Bea to leave home because she reminded Liz too much of her father.

Bea's romantic relationships have been central to her storylines. Writers paired Bea with her second love interest Ned Willis (Ben Hall) in August 2018. He and Bea form a close bond during a series of night time walks and Anderson thought that he made Bea feel safe. Ned and Bea's relationship is badly affected by Finn's return to Ramsay Street, as Ned becomes controlling and possessive of Bea. He deliberately fails to stop a chemical attack in which Bea is poisoned, so that Finn will get the blame. Anderson found the chemical attack scenes to be some of the hardest she had to film. She also agreed with Bea and Ned's subsequent break-up. A romantic relationship is soon re-established between Bea and Finn, who is suffering from amnesia as a result of a fall. Anderson believed that Bea initially feel sadness for Finn, before the "spark" between them returns. During the show's 35th anniversary week, Finn regains his memories and attempts to kill Bea by pushing her into a mineshaft, so he can be with Elly.

The character has a short-lived relationship with Levi Canning (Richie Morris). The pair develop a strong friendship, however, before they can act on their growing feelings, Bea becomes the centre of a love triangle as she begins dating guest character Nathan Packard (Jackson Gallagher). It soon emerges that Nathan was part of a gang who attacked Levi when he was younger and he and Bea eventually part ways. Anderson enjoyed working with Morris and Gallagher on the storyline, and reiterated that Levi was the man for Bea. The pair become a couple during the serial's Christmas episodes. As part of a storyline exploring the danger of picking wild mushrooms, Bea is poisoned after she consumes toxic mushrooms in a pie made by Roxy Willis (Zima Anderson) and Kyle Canning (Chris Milligan). Bea chooses to keep their involvement a secret, which leaves Levi feeling betrayed when he learns the truth. It also exposes a lack of communication between him and Bea. Further issues between them, including Levi getting Bea fired from her job, lead to their break-up.

Anderson decided to leave Neighbours in early 2021 in order to concentrate on her music career and pursue other acting roles. She wanted a dramatic exit, but instead Bea leaves Erinsborough for a road trip around Australia after breaking up with Levi. Anderson filmed her exit scenes on 4 March 2021 and they were broadcast on 24 May 2021. When Neighbours was cancelled in 2022, Anderson reprised the role for its then-finale and for a couple of episodes following its revival. Her final appearance aired on 14 November 2023. The character and Anderson's performance were well received by critics. In 2019, Anderson received a nomination for the Logie Award for Most Popular New Talent. Digital Spy's Conor McMullan observed that Bea's arrival had "really livened up the lives of the Kennedy-Conways", while Sarah Ellis of Inside Soap thought Anderson had done well making the change from singing to acting.

== Casting ==
On 5 May 2018, it was announced that singer Bonnie Anderson had joined the main cast of Neighbours as Beatrix "Bea" Nilsson, the estranged half-sister of Elly Conway (Jodi Anasta). Fiona Bryne of the Herald Sun reported that Anderson had been given a two-year contract with the show, which marked her first major acting role. The serial's executive producer Jason Herbison said the character of Bea was created especially for Anderson, after she impressed producers when she met with them. He called her "a true talent and a perfect fit for Neighbours." Anderson later revealed that she had auditioned for the show a number of times, while April Rose Pengilly confirmed that Anderson originally auditioned for her character Chloe Brennan, before producers wrote the role of Bea for her. Of her casting, Anderson stated "I do pinch myself, this is an amazing job to have, even though I started filming in February, it still feels surreal being on set, seeing how it all happens and being a part of it." Anderson later admitted that Neighbours was "the best thing" that ever happened to her as she felt that it gave her back a sense of self-worth. She relished the structure and the platform it gave her. Anderson made her debut appearance as Bea on 18 May 2018.

== Development ==
=== Characterisation ===
Bea, 20, is Elly’s wild child half-sister. Her real first name is Beatrix – but don't you dare call her that. Bea is guarded and suspicious, sharp as a tack with a potentially fiery temper.

— An excerpt from the character's profile on 10Play.

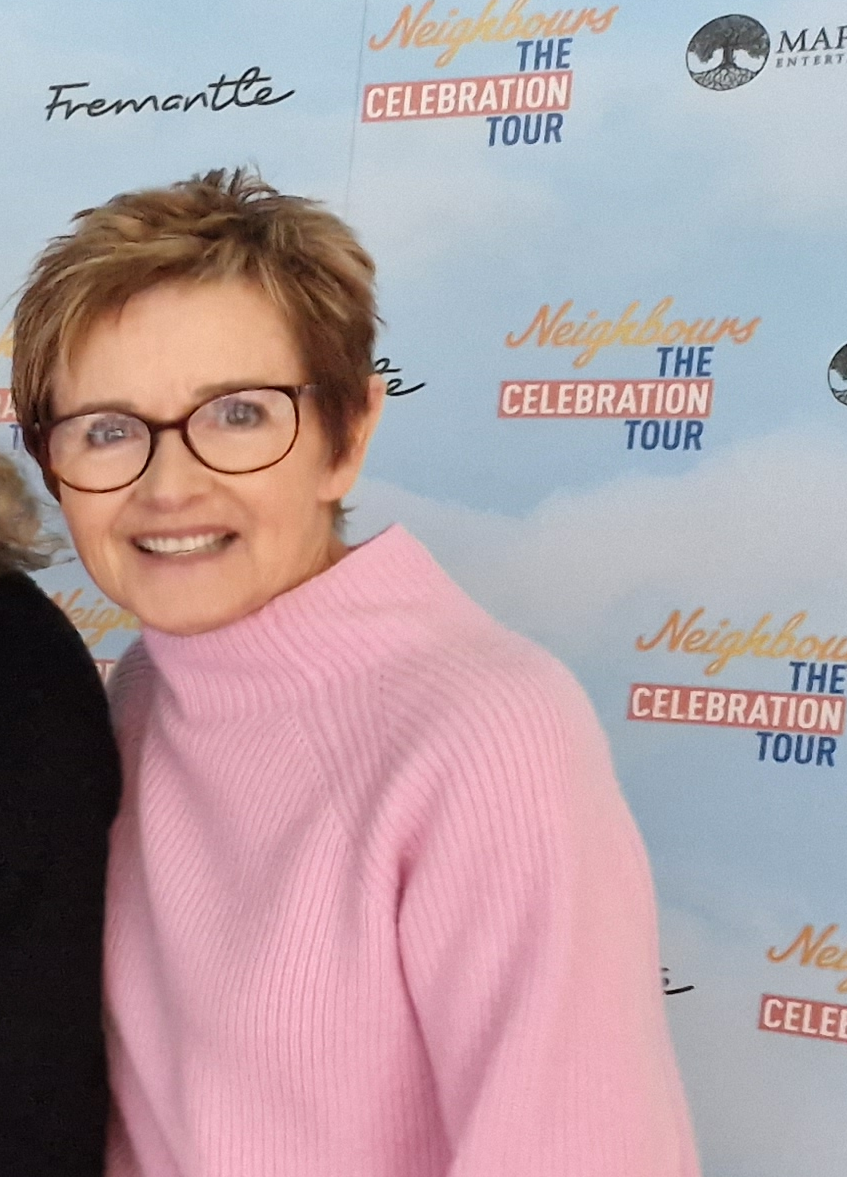
Bea was introduced as the niece of Susan Kennedy, played by Jackie Woodburne (pictured), which Anderson said was "pretty amazing".

The character's profile on the official Neighbours website describes her as being fierce, "prickly" and having a "tough exterior", which she uses to hide a "troubled heart." However, she will "go to the ends of the earth" to protect those she loves. Bea wants "unconditional love", especially from her half-sister. A writer for 10Play called Bea "a strong independent woman, who's incredibly creative and hard-working". Speaking of what she likes about her character, Anderson stated: "I love her, she has depth and when she loves she loves deeply. She has some rough edges and she's done it tough yet there is an innocence and purity about her."

The character's fictional backstory explains that she was raised by her "no hoper dad" until she went to live with her mother and sister. However, Bea and Elly did not get on and after a fight, Bea left home and lived on the streets. Bea resents her sister's seemingly "easy ride through life." Anderson had an understanding of her character's backstory after working with a charity that raises funds for homeless people. Upon her introduction, it emerges that Bea and Elly have been estranged for a long time. Megan Davies of Digital Spy said the sisters have "a tempestuous history", and Elly worries that Bea will turn her life upside down, especially as she has "a dark past". Bea is also the niece of the show's stalwart Susan Kennedy (Jackie Woodburne). Anderson was excited about being part of the Kennedy family, saying "to be playing Susan Kennedy's niece is pretty amazing."

Anderson thought the early positive response to Bea was interesting because her initial scenes had her acting "very guarded, and quite bitchy". Anderson thought Bea's behaviour was understandable because life had been tough for her, explaining: "She's been homeless for five years, and she's always felt like an outsider. She has so much envy towards her sister Elly." Anderson hoped that Bea would be able to rebuild her relationship with Elly, and pointed out that they were sisters and they did love each other. She told Sarah Ellis of Inside Soap that what happened between them would make more sense upon the introduction of their mother.

In April 2020, Anderson called for Bea's father to be introduced, as she thought it would be "cool" to explore more of her character's past and their relationship. She commented "He is out there somewhere – he's this Swedish guy, I believe his name is Lars. I'm not sure if I look Swedish but there you go!" Johnathon Hughes from the Radio Times speculated that introducing Lars to an "already-fractured family" could bring even more drama for Bea, whose relationship with her mother Liz Conway (Debra Lawrance) was so bad that she had to leave home and live on the streets. Anderson also wanted Liz to return and said that there would be plenty of things for Bea to do following Elly's departure.

==== Singing career ====
Producers decided to incorporate Anderson's singing career into the show, starting with Bea performing at a local Christmas carol concert in December 2018. Anderson confirmed that producers had not planned for her character to be singing in the show, and she herself wanted her music and acting careers separated at the beginning. She believed the development had been "quite organic", as Bea was shown to be a songwriter with a singing background, instead of emerging as a "superstar" overnight. During the episode, Bea is "a bundle of nerves" about performing and the arrival of her mother worsens her anxiety, as she recalls a childhood recital that went badly. Anderson admitted that she did not realise how big the Christmas episode would be until an editor allowed her to watch it back. She told Kilkelly: "This is Bea's big moment where she shows her voice after hiding it away for so long. It was really nice to see it come to life and how they put it all together. I'm forever grateful to be part of such a beautiful episode for Christmas Day."

Anderson later released a single "Sorry" via Bea's storyline. She received immediate comparisons to Delta Goodrem, who also launched her early singles during her time playing Nina Tucker in the serial. Anderson wrote the song two years prior to its use in Neighbours and felt that she was "putting myself out there in an authentic way." "Sorry" was released as Anderson's first UK single, after her character performed the song in scenes broadcast in April 2019. The song is about Anderson's experiences with a toxic relationship, which tied into Bea's storyline with Finn. Anderson said the opportunity to tie the two together was "a bizarre but great feeling". Talking about "Sorry" within the show, Anderson explained "The song is designed to help Bea overcome her fears and take back her power. She has a clear message to get across to Finn, which is important for her to have him know."

In 2020, as part of the serial's 35th anniversary, Anderson became the eighth person to record a version of the theme song.

=== Introduction and early storylines ===
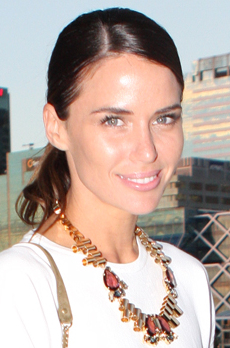
Bea is reunited with her estranged sister Elly, played by Jodi Anasta (pictured). Anderson hoped that they would be able to rebuild their relationship.

The character's introduction coincided with the return of villain Finn Kelly (Rob Mills), who was previously in a relationship with Bea's sister. Mills believed that Finn was obsessed with Elly and said he was "back to settle some scores". In her early scenes, Bea is reunited with her sister and it appears that she is ready to fix their fractured relationship, following a long period of estrangement. However, while Elly is pleased to be given the chance to "make up for lost time", Bea is harbouring resentment over their past. Bea later tells Elly that her boyfriend Patrick is the only person who knows how difficult her life has been. When she later returns to her hotel room to meet with "Patrick", it emerges that he is Finn using a false identity. Mills said that the pair met off-screen prior to their arrival in Erinsborough and had formed "a close bond." He continued: "Elly and Bea have never been close, so Bea didn't met Finn while he was going out with Elly. She has no idea who he really is – but he definitely knows all about her..." Mills later explained that Bea had been living on the streets after "a rough time" with her mother. She and Elly went without contact for a long time, so their relationship is quite poor when Bea comes to Erinsborough. He joked that Finn was "a good Samaritan" for trying to help the sisters reconnect. He also said that viewers would be left questioning whether Finn has genuine feelings for Bea, pointing out that she looks very similar to Elly, which helps Finn to manipulate her. Anderson felt sorry for her character, telling Ellis (Inside Soap) that Bea loves "Patrick" more than anything and she only came to Erinsborough because he persuaded her to be part of her family's lives again.

Finn uses Bea to get revenge on those that he feels has wronged him, including Susan, Elly and Xanthe Canning (Lilly Van der Meer). On the day of a neighbourhood scavenger hunt, Finn takes advantage of Bea's similarity to Elly and convinces her to wear the same dress as her sister, while making sure she is spotted on CCTV. He then hunts down Xanthe and hits her with Elly's car, which later leads to her arrest. Claire Crick of Soaplife reported that Finn persuades Bea to leave town with him after telling her that Elly does not want to attend their wedding. When Elly and Susan try to find Bea they eventually come face-to-face with Finn and "the penny finally drops." Finn lures Susan and Elly into a shipping container, where he has already Bea tied up and leaves all three of them to die. However, Karl Kennedy (Alan Fletcher) and Mark Brennan (Scott McGregor) rescue them, but not before Elly collapses from dehydration. A show spokesperson told Crick: "Bea's heartbroken that she's been so betrayed. The Kennedys are desperate for her to stay with them, but what Finn's done has hit Bea so badly that she chooses to sleep rough at the garage instead." Elly convinces Bea to move to Ramsay Street with her, Susan and Karl, but their relationship remains severely strained, leading Susan to invite their mother Liz (Lawrance) to stay. Neither Bea or Elly are pleased to see Liz, who immediately begins playing them off against one another.

Liz's arrival helps further exploration of Bea's fictional backstory. It emerges that Bea always believed she was asked to leave the family home because of Elly, when it was actually Liz who wanted her gone as Bea reminded her of her former partner. Lawrance explained that Bea is the product of an affair with a man who broke Liz's heart when he left her. As Bea grew up, Liz found that she was "a troublesome teenager who didn't fit into her life", which led her to abandon Bea, who then became homeless. Lawrance said that Liz does not exactly feel guilty about what happened to Bea because of her narcissistic personality. Crick (Soaplife) hoped the revelations from Liz would help Elly and Bea mend their broken relationship. Liz later returns after attending a retreat in an attempt to sort herself out and claims that she has changed her ways. Of this, Anderson stated: "Bea and Elly are never happy to see her, Liz just ruins everything. She's a selfish mum, a selfish sister to Susan, a selfish person... all sorts of selfishness comes from that woman! But Debra plays it so well, and there's lots of drama to come between Liz and her daughters. Don't feel sorry for her!" She also said that things with Liz would get worse and branded her "a nightmare!" She pointed out that Liz "absolutely burns Bea and Elly" and the story would become even more interesting.

Towards the end of 2018, Finn makes his return when Bea visits his cabin in a bid to gain closure. Mills said Finn could not lock three people in a shipping container and get away with it, so he has been "waiting for the heat to subside", but now he was back for revenge. Bea remains calm while Finn "toys" with her and she even tells him that she still loves him. Mills told Tom Spilsbury of Inside Soap: "Finn tries to woo Bea again. He's so creepy! Although he's psychotic, he has definite feelings for her. He loves her, but he's dreaming of both Elly and Bea. That's the thing he can't let go." While Bea is trapped with Finn, Susan, Elly and Xanthe realise where she has gone and go to find her. Bea manages to hit Finn and flee the cabin, where she comes across the other women. As Finn traps them on a cliff edge and grabs hold of Bea, Mills likened him to a child in a candy store, as he confronts the four most important people in his life. However, Finn is soon pushed over the cliff by one of the women, leaving him in a coma. In the aftermath, all the women agree to keep their part in Finn's fall a secret. Daniel Kilkelly of Digital Spy branded Bea "the weak link in this pact of silence", as the guilt overwhelms her. Anderson joked that it was "torture" waiting to see if Finn opens his eyes or not. She said filming the cliff scenes was "so amazing" and that Finn's storyline was "really epic." She added "The fact that he could open his eyes at any moment is a very dramatic possibility for Neighbours and we love that. We'll just have to wait and see, I can't give that away!"

=== Relationships ===
==== Ned Willis ====
Producers established a romantic relationship between Bea and Ned Willis (Ben Hall), which begins when they form a bond in the wake of Finn's disappearance. Hall explained that it begins "coincidentally", after Bea believes she has seen Finn and Ned offers to walk her home. Hall said "Their friendship blossoms from there – but it's early days..." When asked if their friendship would turn romantic, Hall pointed out that his character had previously dated Bea's sister, so things could be "a little bit awkward." Anderson told Inside Soap's Alice Penwill that her character loves her friendship with Ned and how safe he makes her feel. She continued: "She's opened up to Ned more than anybody, and their friendship is getting more and more special. Bea still has her guard up every now and then, but it's good for her to have a friend that she can lean on. Of course, she's falling for him, and things soon speed up for them." When Penwill pointed out that Bea's best friend Yashvi Rebecchi (Olivia Junkeer) had developed a crush on Ned, Anderson said that Bea is initially unaware of Yashvi's feelings for him, which she thought was "odd" as they are close friends. She did not think Bea was someone who liked her friend having a crush on the man she is falling for, but thought they would work it out in the end. Anderson also said that Bea and Ned's potential romance is tested by Bea's intrigue over Finn's whereabouts, which she refuses to let go of, and Ned is not happy that she is actively trying to find him.

Ned and Bea later share a kiss, after Ned declares he has feelings for her. Anderson explained to Johnathon Hughes of the Radio Times that before Ned's declaration, Bea misunderstands his close connection with Yashvi and is "struck" by how her jealousy at seeing them playing football together makes her feel. Anderson told Hughes that when Bea confronts Ned, she stops herself from being honest about her feelings for him due to her issues with commitment. After Ned tells Bea that she has got the situation with Yashvi wrong, they go on their night walk to the botanical gardens, which Ned has decorated, and where he admits that he has romantic feelings for her. When asked about Bea's reaction, Anderson stated "He says this mystery person he's been thinking about a lot is actually Bea and he really wants to be with her! He grabs her, they gives her a big kiss and it's a beautiful, romantic moment. It's so cute. Unfortunately it's too overwhelming for her, and because of the stuff she's been through in the past she runs off!" Anderson told Hughes that despite the setback, the characters remain friends and Ned understands that the timing is not right for them. She also acknowledged that Ned is not likely to wait around forever, but she believed they would sort things out in the end. She hoped fans of the couple would continue to enjoy their relationship, especially as she and Hall had formed a good friendship off-screen, which she hoped came across in their performances. She also teased that there was still a lot of their story to play out, including their team up to expose Cassius Grady (Joe Davidson), who has given them reason to becomes suspicious about his intentions towards Ned's sister Piper Willis (Mavournee Hazel).

Finn's return to Ramsay Street, having "seemingly-reformed" due to amnesia, badly affects Ned and Bea's relationship. Finn's presence causes Ned's possessive side to come out and Anderson explained that he become "very controlling" towards Bea. She believed it was being done out of love, as Ned does not want her to get hurt, but he is "power-tripping". Anderson said Ned's behaviour starts to push Bea towards Finn, which makes Bea even more uncomfortable. Anderson called it "really annoying" for her character considering her history with Finn. She has to remind Ned that she is "a fully capable grown woman" and is able to look out for herself, but he is causing her hurt and making the situation worse. Anderson hoped the couple would be able to work through their issues as they really loved each other. Finn's presence continues to cause issues between Bea and Ned, who begins to disrespect her family because they allowed Finn to move in. He also displays some "aggressive" behaviour and Bea just wants him to back off. Anderson told Simon Timblick of the Radio Times: "It's taken a toll on their relationship. It's not all midnight walks anymore!"

The relationship ends after Bea is poisoned in a chemical attack during the launch of the Sonya Rebecchi Foundation at the community centre. Someone plants gas canisters in the centre's air vents which causes the locals to become seriously ill and Bea ends up passing out. Anderson said filming the attack was "the hardest thing to do." She had to act out an anxiety attack and convulsions, which left her "terrified". She had to use her body differently and said there was no room for vanity. It emerges that Ned knew about the attack, but did not plan to stop it, as the blame would be on Finn. Anderson told Timblick that Ned confesses all this to Bea while he think she is unconscious, however, she hears every word. Anderson described it as "a really sad moment". The actress did not think she would stay with a partner if he did that to her, but of Bea's reaction, she stated "Bea doesn't not love Ned and understands where he's coming from. We all make mistakes, but he could've really hurt her and her family. It's just not on. There is too much anger at the moment and nothing positive. So a break would be sensible..." Timblick suggested that if Bea was single, it would give Finn a chance to "make a move", which Anderson said would be a "crazy" thing to happen.

==== Finn ====
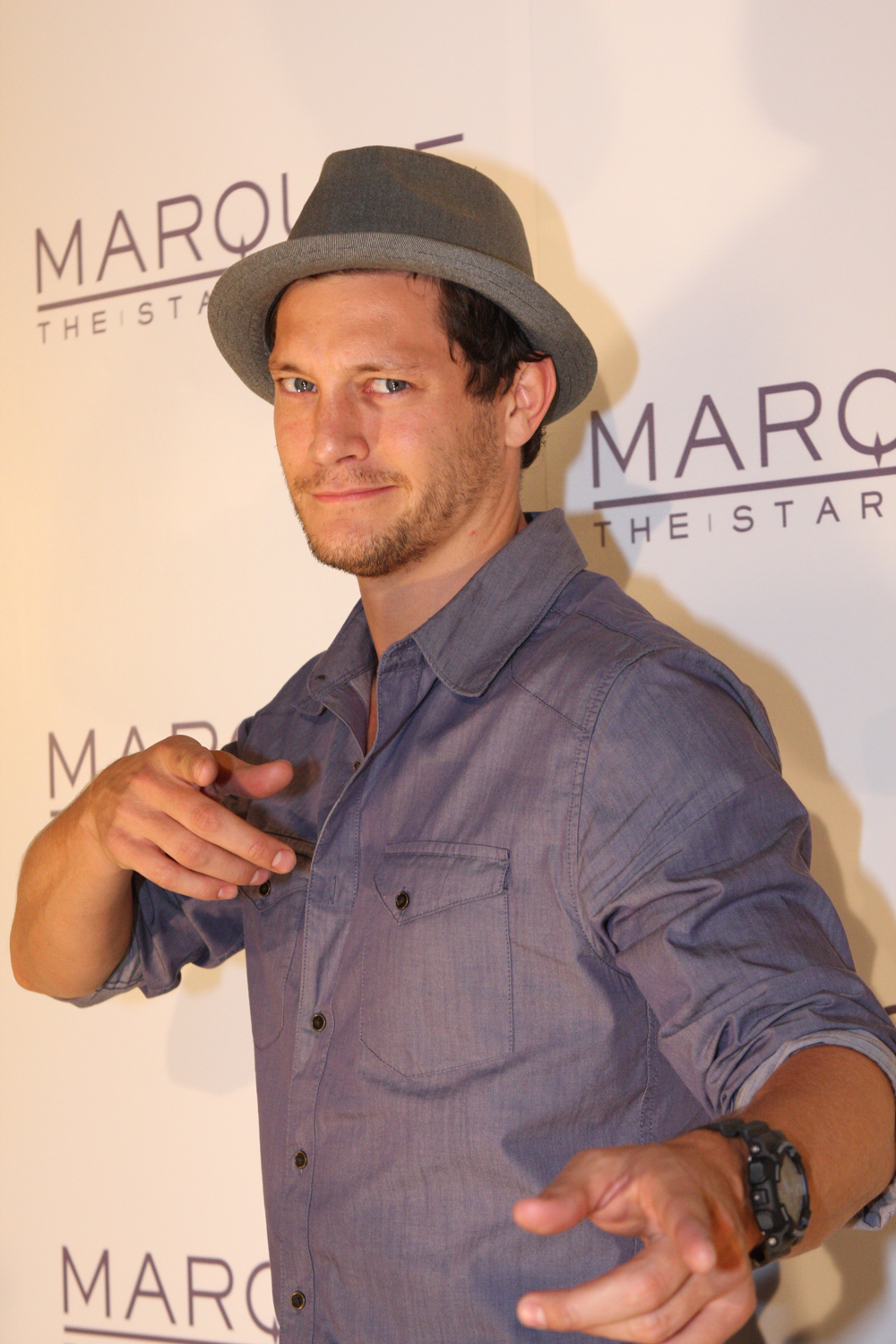
Bea's first love interest Finn Kelly, played by Rob Mills (pictured), has been an integral part of her storylines.

Following Finn's reintroduction, Anderson was asked if he could be forgiven for his past crimes. She replied saying it was possible, but it would take a lot of time. She stated that for Bea, there is "a lot of conflicting emotions and feelings" towards Finn and the amnesia, while the whole the family found it a huge challenge. Anderson believed that Bea felt sadness for Finn, especially after seeing how bad his relationship with his mother is. She later said that Susan forgiving Finn was a big deal for her character because she looks up to her aunt. Bea believes that if Susan can do it, then she can attempt to do the same. She also said that Bea is initially "quite guarded" with Finn, but over time she starts to become more comfortable in his presence. She told Timblick: "She likes having Finn around as she wants to be the one to catch him out if anything goes wrong. Keep your enemies close. That is in the back of her mind, for sure."

Writers later re-established a romantic connection between Finn and Bea. An RTÉ writer noted that "sparks begin to fly" between the former couple as they spend time together, and they later "share a charged moment". Finn and Bea eventually admit their feelings for one another, but out of fear of being judged they keep their relationship a secret. Amy Hadley of TV Week quipped that Finn's "good-guy persona has seen Bea fall for him all over again". While returning home from a romantic date out of town, they stop to share a kiss and are spotted by Ned, who "reels at the sight".

As part of the show's 35th anniversary week, Finn's memories return shortly before he and a group of friends take a trip to a private island for Elly's birthday. The character's evil side re-emerges when he realises that he wants to reconcile with Elly and has to get Bea out of the way first. Mills explained "Finn's already worked out that he has to eliminate Bea. And by eliminate, I mean get her out of the way. Elly says, 'We can't be a thing if Bea's in the picture'. So Finn is like, 'Well, I've got to do what I've got to do!'" Finn leads Bea into the bush and pushes her into a mine shaft, leaving her badly injured, before telling the rest of the group that she has returned to the mainland. Harlow Robinson (Jemma Donovan) later comes across Bea who is trapped with a venomous snake that Finn placed in the mine. She falls into the mineshaft and is bitten by the snake, leaving both women in danger. The pair are later rescued and when Bea is released from the hospital, she tries to move on from the events on the island.

Finn continues to cause problems for her and Elly from "beyond the grave". Elly reveals that Finn had declared his feelings for her and that they even shared a kiss. Alice Penwill of Inside Soap wrote that Bea is "absolutely heartbroken" by the revelation. A show spokesperson also stated "She's already been through so much on the island getaway, and was hoping to return home to recuperate. However, now Bea isn't sure who she can trust – and knowing that Elly went behind her back hurts her more than anything." Anderson believed that Bea decides to forgive her sister's betrayal because the only way to deal with Elly's murder charges is with a united family. Anderson thought it was a "very brave and mature" thing for her character to do, but also pointed out that she does not want Finn to win and break the family either. Bea later watches Finn's video diaries and learns that he fell out of love with her and the kiss with Elly was what triggered his memories to return. Anderson told Johnathon Hughes of the Radio Times that it is "quite confronting" for Bea and it leads her to feel sorry for Elly. Learning about the kiss is "full-on" for both sisters, but it actually brings them closer together. Anderson commented "Bea is a fair person, and sees Finn was unhealthily obsessed with her sister. She won't forget what happened, but will definitely forgive."

==== Levi Canning ====
Producers later established a romantic connection between Bea and new series regular Levi Canning (Richie Morris). Bea and Levi bond during the clear up of Pierce's island, where Levi suffers a seizure and Bea helps him. When she learns that he has epilepsy and is keeping his condition a secret, Bea is "stunned" and airs her concerns as Levi is a police officer. Bea is shown developing feelings for Levi over a number of months, but neither she or Levi act on them and they remain friends. Anderson called it "a confusing rollercoaster" and pointed out that their bond was "very, very strong". She continued: "Over the past few months of getting to know each other, they've found a trust for each other and a great friendship. I think there's a bit of a fear that, if they do admit their feelings, they might ruin that friendship." Anderson also said that Bea is tired of waiting and being let down by Levi, who she thought was "smart enough to realise that Bea is into him". A love triangle was formed following the introduction of Nathan Packard (Jackson Gallagher) in November 2020. Bea and Nathan "serendipitously" meet in the coffee shop, where they literally bump into each other, and share an instant attraction to one another. Anderson told Amy Hadley from TV Week that Nathan's arrival comes at a good time for Bea "to feel a little empowered." Speaking with Digital Spy's Daniel Kilkelly, Anderson explained that Nathan shows Bea how confident he is and how he feels about her, which is all she wanted from Levi. Gallagher said that his character is intrigued by and in awe of Bea.

In a storyline twist, viewers learn that Nathan is part of the gang who attacked Levi when he was a young boy. He has come to Erinsborough to meet with Levi and try to give him closure over the incident. Anderson reckoned Bea would not be so attracted to Nathan if she knew about his past, pointing out that she is "very loyal and protective" and would not want anyone "messing" with her loved ones. She also said Bea is aware of how the attack affected Levi, as she has been supporting him, so it would be "upsetting" for her to learn the man she has a crush on had played a part in it. Asked whether Bea would be able to forgive Nathan, Anderson replied "Bea would be pretty hurt that Nathan hasn't told her the real reason he was in Erinsborough. She'd have to go through a process in order to forgive him. With Bea and Levi, I love the fact that it's such a slow-burning relationship. As Bonnie, I think it'd be a nice pay-off for Bea to end up with the person who she's liked this whole time. They have got such a strong friendship." Anderson enjoyed working with Morris and Gallagher on the storyline, and reiterated that Levi was the man for Bea. Nathan's reasons for being in Erinsborough eventually come out, leaving Bea "infuriated and mortified" as Nathan had ghosted her following their date, leaving her with many questions. Anderson stated that it is too much for Bea and she walks away from both Nathan and Levi. Levi later gives his blessing for Bea and Nathan to date, but she is "unsettled by Levi's strange mood". Roxy Willis (Zima Anderson) tells Bea that Levi has feelings for her, leaving her frustrated because Levi has not been honest with her. During a confrontation Levi admits that it is true.

Scenes broadcast during the Christmas period see the characters finally begin a relationship. Following Nathan's departure, there is an initial awkwardness between Bea and Levi. However, during a Christmas party they finally talk about their feelings for one another and kiss under the mistletoe. Bea and Levi's relationship is tested when she tries to help Ned and is fired from the garage. The storyline begins with Bea finding a dossier about Ned in Sheila Canning's (Shareena Clanton) car, which she is servicing. Anderson said Bea is "instantly fearful for Ned" as the dossier contains private information. As she is discussing her suspicions with Yashvi and Roxy, Sheila overhears and explains that she was reaching Ned's past before offering him a job. Anderson commented: "It's highly embarrassing for Bea that she jumped to conclusions". After apologising to Sheila, Bea prepares to tell her boss Lucas Fitzgerald (Scott Major) what happened, however, Levi speaks to Lucas first and he fires Bea. Anderson said the garage was her character's "safe place", so she is furious with Levi despite his good intentions. Laura Masia of TV Week observed that the couple's relationship "has already been through the ringer" and wondered if the incident would be the "last straw" for them. The couple later plan a road trip, but Bea realises that she needs to be honest with Levi and breaks up with him. The Radio Times' Johnathon Hughes quipped that the couple "have literally run out of road". The development leads to the character's departure from the serial, as she decides to go on the road trip as "a newly-single, independent woman."

=== Poisoning ===
Bea's life is placed in danger as part of a storyline exploring the danger of picking wild mushrooms. Earlier scenes show Roxy Willis picking the mushrooms for a dish that Kyle Canning (Chris Milligan) is entering into a food competition, unaware that they are toxic. The judge, who only has a small bite of the dish, soon falls seriously ill. Ned later gives Bea one of Kyle's kangaroo pies, which contains a gravy made with the mushrooms. Anderson commented "Bea thinks the roo pies are the special recipe that, hopefully, is going to win the 'Best Dish Of Erinsborough' competition. But what she doesn't know is where the ingredients for the dish came from." After eating the pie for her lunch, the poison from the mushrooms causes Bea to collapse in front of Levi. Morris told Inside Soap's Alice Penwill that his character initially believes Bea has a stomach issue, but the "gravity of the situation changes pretty quickly". At the hospital, it emerges that Bea's organs are shutting down. As the doctors battle to save her, a guilty Roxy and Kyle go to the hospital to come clean about the pies. Milligan said his character is "devastated", as he considers Bea like family because she is dating his cousin.

As Bea's condition improves, Roxy reveals that it was the pie that poisoned her. She and Kyle are "shocked" when Bea covers for them and keeps the source of her collapse a secret. Of Bea's decision, Anderson explained: "Bea knows how much The Tram means to Kyle and what it means to his dad Gary [Damien Richardson]. This could end The Tram. Gary lost his life trying to save Bea, so she'll do anything to protect them." Milligan added that Kyle is relieved by Bea's decision because he does not want to let go of The Tram, as the memory of his father goes with it. The incident continues to affect Bea and the Cannings as Levi investigates the cause of Bea's collapse. He notices inconsistences in her story about where she got the mushrooms and then notices Kyle has removed the pies from The Tram's menu. Morris described Levi as feeling "betrayed, hurt and annoyed" when he realises that Kyle and Bea have been keeping secrets. Levi's anger at his cousin sees him report The Tram to the council. Morris explained it "damages the trust" between Bea and Levi, who both believe that they are doing the right thing. It also exposes a lack of communication between them.

=== Departure and returns ===
On 21 February 2021, Fiona Byrne of the Herald Sun confirmed Anderson's departure from Neighbours. Anderson chose to leave so she could concentrate on her music career. She stated "I was like a pig in mud at that place. Neighbours really changed my life for the better in so, so many ways. I feel like at the age I was, 23, when I joined the show it has really shaped me into the person that I am today. I have overcome a lot, I have grown and I am proud of the way I live my life. It was really good to have that structure and now after 3½ years on that show I have decided it is time for me to continue challenging myself and create space to focus on my music and songwriting and more acting." Anderson later explained that her decision to leave Neighbours was "a little bit difficult", but she felt that it was right, as she wanted to be able to challenge herself and she had "ticked off all the boxes" she could with the show. She reiterated her intention to focus on her music career, but she also wanted to pursue new acting roles.

Anderson did not get a say in how her character exits the serial, but she admitted that she had wanted something dramatic, like "a real big death". Anderson filmed her final scenes on 4 March 2021, and Bea departed in the episode broadcast on 24 May 2021. Scenes showed a newly single Bea decide to leave Erinsborough and go on a road trip. The episode also marked the departure of Sheila Canning (Clanton), who, having befriended Bea, joins her on the trip. Bea shares "heartfelt farewells" with Karl, Susan, Ned, and Yashvi before she and Sheila drive out of the street, while she leaves Levi "an emotional letter". A year later, Joe Anderton of Digital Spy reported that Anderson had agreed to reprise her role for the show's finale, following the news that Neighbours had been cancelled. Anderton confirmed that Bea was returning to reunite with Elly. Following the renewal of the show, Anderson returned as part of the show's flashback episodes in November 2023, which explores what happened in the two years after the then-finale.

== Reception ==
For her portrayal of Bea, Anderson received a nomination for the Logie Award for Most Popular New Talent in 2019. Sarah Ellis of Inside Soap thought Anderson was doing "a sterling job" making the change from singing to acting. Of the character's early storylines, Ellis' colleague Alice Penwill wrote "It's been an explosive start for Neighbours newcomer Bea Nilsson. She's been reunited with estranged sister Elly, manipulated by evil Finn Kelly, and locked up in a trailer – all within six months!" Conor McMullan from Digital Spy included Bea's introduction during his feature on "how Neighbours has been nailing it in 2018". He said the character had "really livened up the lives of the Kennedy-Conways." McMullan also thought Finn's return had been "a great introduction for Bea".

While reviewing Liz and Bea's Christmas scenes, Bridget McManus of The Sydney Morning Herald branded Bea a "reluctant songstress", and observed "The dark humour of their clash gives way to the heavier theme of the mother-daughter bond, in all its manifestations. Not even Christmas can call a ceasefire in this fractious cul-de-sac." The Herald Sun's Joanne Hawkins branded Bea "feisty" and thought that Anderson's single "Sorry" was "neatly worked into the show".

When Bea reunited with Finn, TV Week's Amy Hadley quipped: "It's the Neighbours re-coupling we never expected." During the 35th anniversary episodes, Daniel Kilkelly commented "Poor Bea has learned the hard way that dating a supervillain with amnesia on Ramsay Street was never going to end well." Bea's romantic woes with Nathan and Levi led Joe Julians of the Radio Times to state that the character's "run of bad men luck continues", before adding "things have not gone smoothly for Bea Nilsson (Bonnie Anderson) in Neighbours when it comes to her love life – her last boyfriend was Finn Kelly after all." A writer for 10Play stated that "2020 has been quite the rollercoaster" for the character. They were "rooting" for Bea and Levi to become a couple, explaining that they were both "hotties" and Bea deserved to be with someone she could let down her walls with.

When Bea broke up with Levi, the publication's Johnathon Hughes joked that she "finally admits what the universe (and the storylines) have been trying to tell her for weeks – her and Levi Canning (Richie Morris) are doomed." Hughes later summed up Bea and Levi's "short-lived relationship", saying "his cousin poisoned her with some dodgy pies, he accidentally got her fired from her job, she broadcast her doubts about their future on a podcast for everyone to hear... No wonder she's decided to call it a day and leave Ramsay Street for good."
