= Finn Kelly =

Fictional character from the Australian soap opera Neighbours

- Neighbours character
- Portrayed by: Rob Mills
- Duration: 2017–2022
- First appearance: 15 March 2017
- Last appearance: 28 July 2022
- Introduced by: Jason Herbison
- Spin-off appearances: Neighbours: Erinsborough High (2019)
In-universe information
- Other names: Patrick Ashton
- Occupation: Science teacher; Acting principal; Charity worker
- Father: Trent Kelly
- Mother: Claudia Watkins
- Stepfather: Errol Watkins
- Half-brothers: Shaun Watkins
- Wife: Miranda Kelly (divorced)
- Nieces: Aster Conway

Finn Kelly is a fictional character from the Australian television soap opera Neighbours, played by Rob Mills. The actor relocated to Melbourne, where the show's studios are located, for the role of progressive high school teacher Finn. Mills began filming his first scenes in early November 2016, and he confirmed that he would be on-screen for around four to five months. He made his first appearance during the episode broadcast on 15 March 2017. Finn was introduced as a replacement for fellow teacher Brad Willis (Kip Gamblin) at Erinsborough High.

Finn initially projected a charismatic, affable, easygoing persona, which concealed his true sociopathic nature. He schemes to win back his former girlfriend Elly Conway (Jodi Anasta) and become principal of the school, before a brain aneurysm kills him. He manipulates student Xanthe Canning (Lilly Van der Meer) into helping him by using inappropriate flattery. Finn interferes with Susan Kennedy's (Jackie Woodburne) multiple sclerosis medication, resulting in her hospitalisation and his subsequent promotion to principal. However, this soon leads to the character's downfall, and as his crimes are exposed, he tries to flee the country. After attempting to frame Xanthe and surviving a ruptured aneurysm, Finn departed on 29 June 2017.

Mills reprised the role for another guest stint in May 2018. Finn returns to Erinsborough with Elly's sister Bea Nilsson (Bonnie Anderson), who believes him to be a disabled man called Patrick, in order to exact his revenge. He uses Bea to frame Elly for a hit-and-run on Xanthe, which he carries out. Finn later corners Susan, Elly, Bea and Xanthe on a cliff edge, and he is pushed over by Susan, resulting in a four-month coma. Mills was promoted to the regular cast in March 2019 and Finn was redeemed through an amnesia storyline, which saw him move in with the Kennedys and start a new relationship with Bea. Mills enjoyed playing Finn's vulnerable side and hoped viewers would sympathise with him. Mills finished filming with the show in December 2019, and his exit scenes aired on 24 March 2020. Mills later reprised the role for a guest stint in March 2021 and on 28 July 2022 for the show's final episode.

For his portrayal of Finn, Mills was longlisted for Best Daytime Star at the 2019 Inside Soap Awards. Finn was named "one of the nastiest characters Neighbours has ever seen" by Johnathon Hughes of Radio Times. Finn's redemption storyline and promotion to the regular cast has proved divisive among viewers.

== Casting ==
On 15 November 2016, Sophie Dainty of Digital Spy reported that actor Rob Mills had been cast in the guest role of high school teacher Finn Kelly. Mills began shooting his first scenes during the same week. Of joining the cast, Mills stated: "I can't wait to get started on the show. As a youngster, I played baseball just behind where Ramsay Street is located and I thought at the time, how great it would be to be on Neighbours, and now it has happened!" He later confirmed that his character's storyline would run for around four to five months. Mills made his first appearance as Finn on 15 March 2017.

== Development ==
=== Characterisation and introduction ===
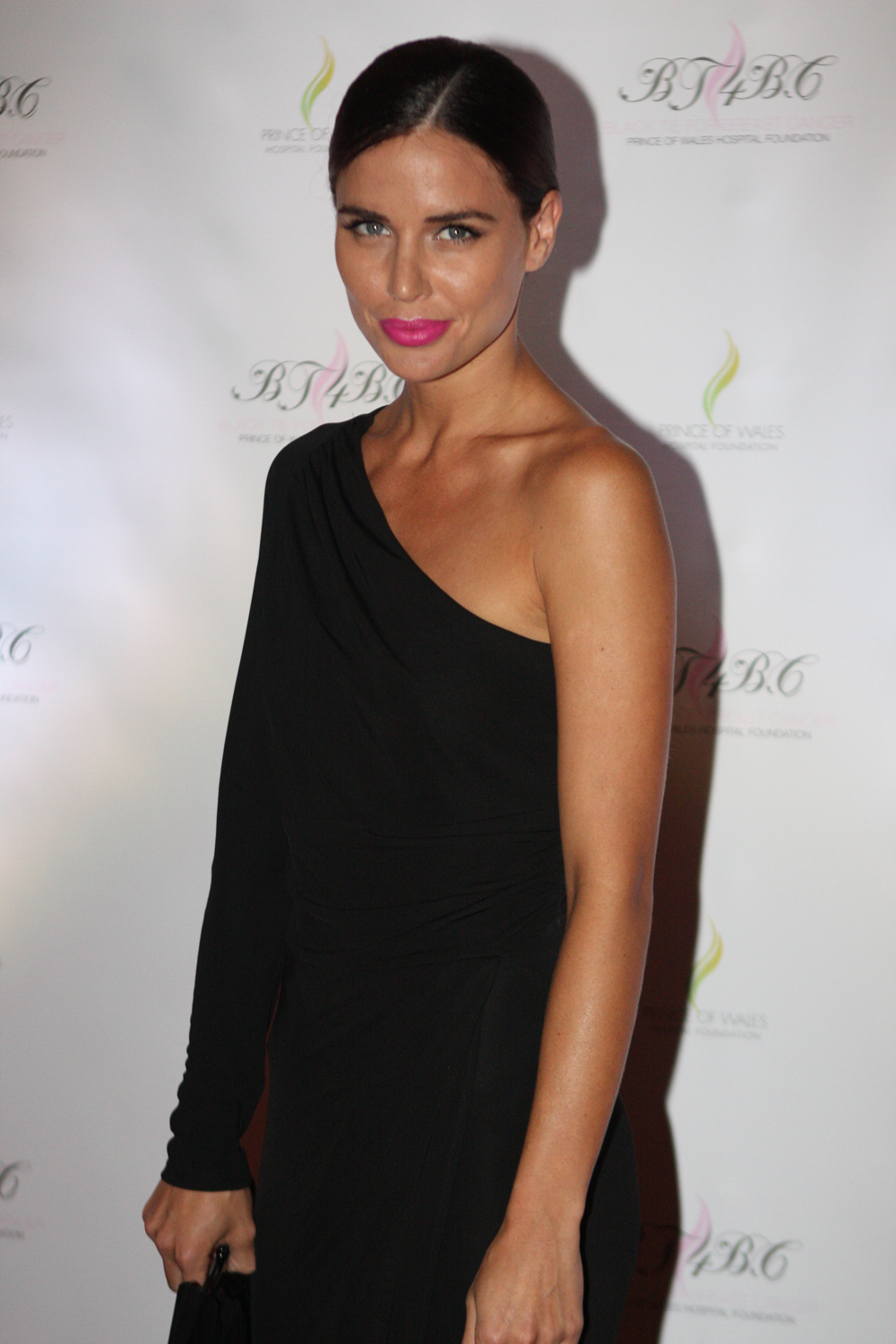
Finn was introduced as the former boyfriend of Elly Conway, played by Jodi Anasta (pictured), who worries that he will cause trouble for her professionally.

Finn is hired by Erinsborough High principal Susan Kennedy (Jackie Woodburne) to replace teacher Brad Willis (Kip Gamblin). He is described as being "charismatic and affable", as well as a "progressive and respected school teacher". Of his similarities to the character, Mills told Colin Vickey of the Herald Sun: "They told me that he was handsome and charming and I went 'yeah, I can do that'. He loves kids. He is like Robin Williams in Dead Poets Society. He wants to make a difference in this world as an educator. That is my modus operandi as well. I love helping out kids and teaching." Daniel Kilkelly of Digital Spy observed Finn was "warm, easygoing and friendly" upon his arrival. Claire Tonkin of Network Ten stated that Finn "brings an unexpected agenda, juicy secrets and oodles of charm." As Finn settles in, it becomes clear that there is more to him "than meets the eye", and the serial's executive producer, Jason Herbison called him "a really intriguing character". Vickery (Herald Sun) noted that Finn "has a dark side", which led Mills to describe him as "driven". He explained that Finn does not let anything get in the way of what he wants and initially only the viewers would see this side of him. He added that Finn is "quite good at charming and manipulating people to convince them of his good intentions."

On-screen it emerges that Finn had a relationship with fellow teacher Elly Conway (Jodi Anasta) when they both lived in Sydney. Anasta said that Elly was in love with Finn, but she was unaware that he was married and lying to her at the time. Anasta called him "the ultimate charmer and heartbreaker". She also said that Finn is the former boyfriend that Elly attempted to run down in her car, which had been briefly mentioned on-screen before his arrival. Finn's introduction also led to further exploration of Elly's background and behaviour. She is "taken aback" when she sees him at the school, and viewers are given an insight into the manipulation and embarrassment she suffered while working with Finn in Sydney. Elly worries that Finn is going to cause trouble for her, while Susan is impressed by him. Anasta stated that like Elly, Finn has been through "some tough times". He has issues, and does not necessary make the right choices, which makes him seem like a bad person, but he is not "intrinsically nasty or horrible." He and Elly initially clash over their history, before she asks him to resign and leave the school, which Finn refuses to do. He later finds her at a local bar and says he wants to make amends, but Elly does not forgive him and they cause a scene. Finn begins tutoring Elly's student Xanthe Canning (Lilly Van der Meer) and shows interest in her cousin Ben Kirk's (Felix Mallard) career plans. While he is talking with Xanthe, Elly confronts him about an online comment regarding the incident at the bar. She pushes him away from her and he falls down some stairs in front of Xanthe.

=== Career ambitions and manipulation of Xanthe Canning ===
Finn wants to reunite with Elly and take the principal job from Susan. A writer for TV Soap said that relocating to Erinsborough to work at the high school was all part of Finn's plan to win Elly back, after ruining their relationship with his "vindictive scheming". Having realised that he is in love with Elly, Finn does not want to waste time as he has a brain aneurysm, that could rupture at any moment. He knows that he has the perfect opportunity to fulfil his dream of becoming a school principal, and begins keeping notes on every decision Susan makes. He also convinces Xanthe to be his spy at the school, after she learns about his aneurysm. Finn "turns on the charm" with Elly and they have sex. Following their night together, Elly avoids Finn and later says that she does not want to be in a relationship with him. Adding to his frustrations, she and Susan find Xanthe a new tutor, as they realise that she has become too involved in his personal life. Finn loses his temper with Elly and receives a warning about his behaviour, leading him to step up his plan to have Susan removed from her job. Finn starts by using his relationship with Elly to undermine Susan's role as principal.

Finn also finds an opportunity to continue his manipulation of Xanthe when he finds her organising a picnic at the lake on Mother's Day. He plays on her sympathetic nature by admitting that he finds the day difficult, as his mother is dead. Finn later gifts Xanthe a necklace for her birthday, and allows her to attend a hospital appointment with him. The next step in Finn's plan sees him interfere with Susan's multiple sclerosis (MS) medication, resulting in her hospitalisation and his promotion to acting principal. While shooting the medication swap scene, the director asked Mills to make it clear that Finn did not find his decision easy, showing that he was not all bad and had chosen "the darker path" as it was the quickest way to achieve his goal. Mills said that Finn has to use Susan's collapse to remind others that she is not fit to run the school, which convinces them that he is the best person for the position. He also explained that he enjoyed being "Susan's nemesis" and playing out the tension between her and Finn, saying "there was no shouting or confrontation, they hate each other but both chose to play the long game."

"First and foremost Finn is a great teacher. He wants to make a difference, inspire young people and change the education system and bring it up to date. Oh, and he's a sociopath as well! As an actor you stick up for your character – he may do bad things but he's still inherently good. He's just misunderstood! Basically, Susan is in Finn's way, he needs to be school principal in order to make these changes. She keeps shutting him down so has to get out of the way."

— Mills on Finn's agenda.

After Xanthe realises that he is behind Susan's condition, Finn uses "inappropriate flattery" to make sure she keeps quiet. Johnathon Hughes of Radio Times observed that Finn is "borderline grooming" Xanthe with his manipulative behaviour, and Mills admitted to being worried about how far his character was going to go with her. He said, "I spoke to the writers early on and they explained it wasn't going to be that kind of relationship. Xanthe has fallen for Finn, but it's not reciprocated romantically by him at all. She lacks a positive male role model in her life and Finn is the first person in her life who has really nurtured her." He also said that Finn needs Xanthe to keep his aneurysm a secret, and that he genuinely wants her and the other students to do well at school. Mills told Hughes that Finn does worry he has taken things with Xanthe too far. He realises that she has the information to cause his downfall, and he cannot risk her finding out that he has been using her. The actor later said that Finn will go as far as he can with Xanthe without their relationship becoming sexual, as he still loves Elly. However, he will tell Xanthe he loves her if it means she does not become suspicious about his intentions.

=== Downfall ===
The character's downfall is sparked by student protests at the changes he has made to the school, including a vertical integration teaching scheme. Mills admitted that Finn "hasn't put any logistics in place for this system to work" and called his character "an idiot". He explained that Finn just assumed the students and teachers would be ready, which adds to his frustrations because he does not have the time to implement things slowly. Mills commented that it makes Finn's behaviour "more maniacal." Piper and Ben later show Finn a petition and Piper films his reaction to send to the local newspaper. Finn then "goads" Ben over Xanthe's decision to break up with him. Finn's involvement in Susan's hospitalisation is also discovered after Nell Rebecchi (Scarlett Anderson) swallows some of the pills and collapses. Susan's husband Karl Kennedy (Alan Fletcher) notices Susan tested positive for the same painkillers, and gives them to the police.

With the medication swap exposed and the police wanting to question him, Finn decides to leave the country. However, Xanthe believes herself to be in love with him and books herself a ticket too, telling Finn that he needs someone to look after him. Mills told Ellis (Inside Soap) that Finn feels he cannot say no in case Xanthe tells everyone the truth about his crimes. He also revealed that they shot the plane scenes out of sequence, after he had only completed a couple of weeks filming. He called it "a good acting exercise" as he had to really think about the things Finn and Xanthe would go through to get to that point. Finn and Xanthe are found by the police and taken to the station, where Finn is questioned about poisoning Susan and having an inappropriate relationship with Xanthe. Finn tells the police that Xanthe poisoned Susan and frames her with false evidence. When faced with the accusation, Xanthe refuses to believe that Finn would do that to her, and does not cooperate with the police any further.

After he is released, Finn goes into hiding. Mills told Soaplife's Alison James that Finn is waiting for "the heat to die down" over the "furore" he has caused at the school and with Xanthe. During a showdown with Xanthe, who realises that he has used her, Finn's aneurysm bursts. Mills said it had been just a matter of time before it did, and Finn had been experiencing headaches whenever he became frustrated or angry. Finn falls into a coma and Xanthe calls an ambulance. When he wakes up, he claims to be paralysed and later claims that he was almost smothered by Elly. Mills thought Finn was on a downward spiral and struggling to get out of the mess he has made. The actor told James that Finn becomes "a compulsive liar and he turns into something of a psychopath". Finn made his exit on 29 June 2017, following a confrontation with Susan, who realises that he is not remorseful. Mills would not rule out a return for his character in the future, saying "I'd be up for returning at some point if they'll have me. I want Finn to be redeemed, if that's at all possible..."

=== Reintroduction ===
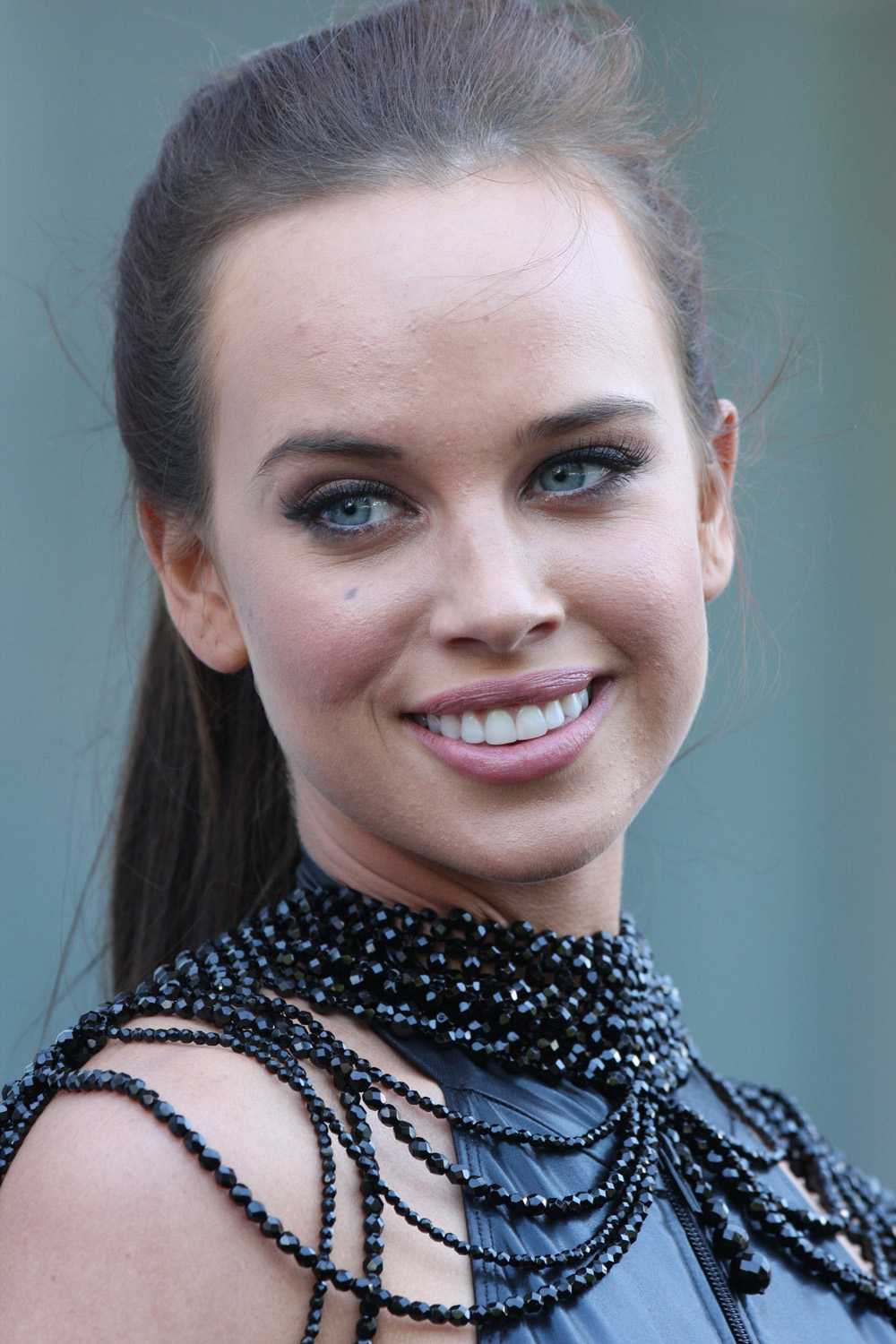
The character returned alongside new cast member Bonnie Anderson (pictured), who plays Finn's victim and Elly's sister, Bea Nilsson.

Mills reprised the role for another guest stint the following year, and Finn returned on 22 May 2018. Mills stated that he was "absolutely thrilled" when he received a call asking him to return. He praised the writers for the "magnificent job" they did scripting Finn's return, adding "this storyline is testament to just how psychotic Finn really is..." Mills said Finn's teaching ambitions had gone, but he still had a "desire to be a manipulator." Instead, Finn returns to Erinsborough to get his revenge, as he feels he has unfinished business. Mills explained, "He's been to prison and served his time and I'd like to say he's rehabilitated, but I really don't think he is. There's great hurt in him. He doesn't like to lose and if anything he's gotten a little worse this time round."

Mills confirmed that Finn is still obsessed with Elly, but he holds a grudge against her because his love is unrequited, leading to "some psychosis". Mills confirmed that Finn would not have much to do with Xanthe this time round, but when he does, his actions would have "a big impact" on her. He also said that Finn still does not like Susan, and there would be no reconciliation between them.

It soon emerges that Finn is dating Elly's younger sister Bea Nilsson (Bonnie Anderson), who was introduced shortly before his return. Mills explained that Bea has been living on the streets and is estranged from her family, following a falling out with her mother. The actor joked, "So Finn thought it might be a good idea if they just patched things up, because he's such a good Samaritan!" Finn uses the pseudonym "Patrick", so Bea has no idea who he really is. Mills told Johnathon Hughes of Radio Times that viewers would be left wondering whether his feelings for her were genuine, pointing out that she looks a lot like Elly, which is easier for his manipulation. He called Bea "savvy" and "resilient", and he thought she would be fine despite being around "a strong narcissist" like Finn. He also mentioned that Bea and Finn have formed "a close bond".

Finn has also convinced Bea that he needs a wheelchair, and tries to avoid her seeing him out of it. He also manages to secure a job at the hospital as Karl Kennedy's assistant on an MS trial, but makes sure that he is not seen by Karl or Susan, who drops by the office to deliver her medical file, which Finn steals. Finn's plan starts to unravel when Bea finds his wheelchair at their apartment and he is nowhere to be found. He tells her that he has been getting some movement back in his legs, but sensing that Bea is sceptical and about to break up with him, Finn proposes and Bea accepts. She then asks him to meet her family, which he initially agrees to, but then cancels at the last moment. Finn tampers with the data from the MS trial, leading to good results that Karl plans to present at a medical conference. However, Finn contacts the hospital's COO Clive Gibbons (Geoff Paine) and tells him the data has been falsified, leading Clive to shut down the trial.

Finn's revenge plan is revealed on the day of a local scavenger hunt when he deliberately strikes Xanthe with Elly's car, before kidnapping three of his victims. The storyline also saw the character make a temporary exit from the serial. Finn takes Elly's car and drives it at Xanthe and Chloe Brennan (April Rose Pengilly) at high speed. Xanthe pushes Chloe out of the way, taking the full impact of the car. Van der Meer commented, "She sees Finn staring at her behind the wheel, there's a split-second where they lock eyes then she's hit and knocked out." Elly is blamed for the attempt on Xanthe's life, until Xanthe wakes from a coma and reveals that Finn was behind the wheel. Susan and Elly later come face to face with Finn, as they try to track down Bea. He lures them into a shipping container, where he has already put Bea, and locks them all in. He then flees the scene, leaving the women to die. Karl and Mark Brennan (Scott McGregor) eventually rescue the women, and Elly is rushed to hospital with dehydration. Bea is left "heartbroken that she's been so betrayed" by Finn.

=== Cliff fall and redemption ===
Towards the end of 2018, the character reappears as Bea finds him at a remote cabin in the bush, where he has been hiding since leaving her for dead. Bea has been seeking closure on her relationship with Finn, and is "horrified" when she comes face to face with him. Mills explained that Finn "has had some time out", continuing "Obviously, you can't lock three people in a shipping container and expect to get away with it! The police are looking for him, so he's been waiting for the heat to subside. Now he's back for revenge!" Finn initially tells Bea that he wants to make things right between them and attempts to seduce her. Bea says she never stopped loving him, but Finn is aware that this is a lie. Mills described Finn's behaviour as "creepy", but said he has genuine feelings for Bea. As Bea strikes Finn and runs from the cabin, she meets Susan, Elly and Xanthe, who have tracked her location. The women are confronted by Finn at the edge of a cliff. Mills likened his character to "a kid in a candy store", as the women have been very important to him at one time or another.

The confrontation ends with Finn being pushed over the cliff and the women agreeing to keep what happened to themselves. The scenes were filmed over a couple of days, and Mills came close to falling from the cliff for real, so the fearful reactions from the actresses was real. A stunt man then came in to shoot Finn's fall. Finn is found and taken to the hospital, where he remains in a coma. Bea, Xanthe, Susan and Elly keep quiet about their involvement, but Elly struggles and Susan starts having visions of Finn. They soon learn that Finn planted canisters of cyanide in the school air vents, after several students and teachers fall ill. This prompts Susan to almost smother Finn at the hospital, and then confess that she was the one who pushed him off the cliff.

In March 2019, following scenes in which Finn woke from his coma, the show announced via its social media platforms that Mills had signed a permanent contract, meaning Finn would become a member of the regular cast. Producers plotted a redemption storyline arc for the character, after he is diagnosed with retrograde amnesia. Finn believes the year is 2007 and he is a nineteen year old university student. The producers also chose to introduce returning character Beverly Marshall (Shaunna O'Grady) into the storyline, as she carries out a series of tests and concludes that Finn's amnesia is genuine. Karl offers to help Finn recover his memories, by taking him to familiar places, but his plan fails. Mills told Inside Soap's Alice Penwill: "Finn doesn't remember anything. But I suppose that's the best thing for Finn – hopefully now he has the chance to start afresh." Finn later seeks advice from lawyer Imogen Willis (Ariel Kaplan), knowing that if his memories return, he could be going to prison. Mills hoped viewers would believe that Finn has amnesia and might sympathise with him. He called the new Finn "a really good guy", and added "I've had to tap into different emotions to discover these different layers. He isn't one-dimensional, and it's been fun to play his vulnerable side."

The attitudes of the character's involved with Finn also begin to change, including Susan, who becomes more empathetic towards him as she spends time at the hospital. Bea plans to tell Finn how much he hurt her, but when she sees him save Imogen and Susan from a speeding car, it causes her to change her mind about him, leaving her conflicted when it comes to his sentencing hearing. Anderson said her character was "terrified" by Finn, but she has since seen "a complete transformation" in him. She continued, "Seeing him in court really opens up some old wounds for her. She has to relive her ordeal, yet Finn clearly has no recollection of what he did – so it's hard for Bea to hate him..." Instead of the expected "character assassination", Bea's statement to the court is sympathetic towards Finn. At the conclusion of the hearing, Finn is given a non-custodial sentence. Needing somewhere to live, Finn's half-brother Shaun Watkins (Brad Moller) asks the Kennedys to house him and Bea is "taken aback" when they agree, meaning she has to share a house with her abuser. Her boyfriend Ned Willis (Ben Hall) is also not happy with the arrangement, and later believes he has witnessed Finn intimidating Bea.

=== Relationship with Bea Nilsson ===
Bea and Finn's romantic connection was revisited in May 2019, following the breakdown of Bea and Ned's relationship, due to his involvement in a revenge plan on Finn. Feeling guilty for the part he played in their break up, Finn attempts to get them back together. However, it makes Ned realise that Bea was right to end their relationship. Bea later thanks Finn for trying to help her out. The former couple later come close to kissing, leaving Bea confused and unwilling to talk about it. Finn also struggles and they turn to Karl and Susan for advice. Katie Baillie of Metro noted that Bea seemed "horrified" that she cares for Finn, and unaware that she never "quite buried her feelings" for him. Finn is "disappointed, but understanding" when Bea wants to forget the incident happened.

Finn and Bea's feelings for one another are revealed when he deals with an obsessive fan, Alfie Sutton (Harry Borland), who has broken into the house to take a photo with him. Finn reacts violently when Alfie approaches Bea, and pulls him away. Alfie blackmails Finn and Bea into letting him go, knowing that Finn will get into trouble if they go to the police. Finn then explains to Bea that he was "overprotective" because he is in love with her, and she tells him she feels the same. As they attempt to keep their relationship a secret, Finn and Bea decide to go on a date outside of Erinsborough. Although Bea has a flashback to when she was manipulated by him, the date is a success. But later that day, Ned spots them kissing, putting their secret at risk.

Finn and Bea eventually decide to tell their family and friends about their relationship, before they find out some other way. A shocked Karl and Elly urge Bea to break off the relationship, as they think she will get hurt again, but Bea remains committed to Finn. The relationship is tested by the reappearance of Alfie, who breaks into the Kennedy house and steals Finn and Bea's clothes. When Karl and Susan learn of the incident with Alfie and his obsession with Finn, they encourage Finn to go to the police or move out. Finn reports the break in and assault to the police, and is held at the station when Alfie contradicts his statement. After being informed that he will be held on remand, Finn has a panic attack. Lawyer Toadfish Rebecchi (Ryan Moloney) then asks that Finn be placed under house arrest instead.

Writers introduced the character's estranged father Trent Kelly (Peter Houghton) in February 2020, leading to further exploration of his fictional backstory. Finn tells Bea and Susan that his father suffered with alcoholism, which "turned him into a mess" and they started to lose touch, which worsened when Finn went to university. Kilkelly (Digital Spy) explained that Finn feels that does not have closure on his past, so Bea contacts Trent on his behalf and meets him with Elly. They learn a secret about Trent "which could devastate Finn". The storyline also tests Finn's relationship with Bea again, as he becomes closer to Elly.

=== Departure and returns ===
Mills finished filming with the show in December 2019. Of leaving, he commented "That was the end of my three years as the character of Finn Kelly. I have a lot of auditions coming up." His character's exit scenes aired on 24 March 2020, as the third death part of the 35th anniversary week of Neighbours. Finn drowns in a shallow grave that he has dug for Susan. Although Finn's death is an accident, Elly's suspicious behaviour at the scene leads her to be questioned by the police and later charged with his murder.

Mills later reprised the role for a short guest stint beginning 2 March 2021. Finn reappears as Susan begins using a visualisation technique to help her gain closure over her trauma. Of his return, Mills stated "It's just a short resurrection, no witchcraft involved. It was so good, the way it was written and shot. Finn has some unfinished business." Mills liked that his character was still part of the show and his presence on the street "has haunted people." In June 2022, Mills appeared on Studio 10 to discuss the Neighbours finale, following its cancellation earlier in the year. He told hosts Sarah Harris and Tristan MacManus that he had been on set for the filming of the final scene, but did not confirm at the time whether he would be reprising his role. Mills did make an appearance as a ghostly Finn during the finale, which aired on 28 July 2022.

== Storylines ==
Finn takes a teaching job at Erinsborough High, alongside his former girlfriend Elly Conway, who asks that he resigns immediately. Elly blames Finn for sabotaging a presentation at the last school they worked at, and for not telling her he was married when they dated. Finn plots to take the principal job from Elly's aunt Susan Kennedy. He also takes over Xanthe Canning's tutoring. Elly believes Finn is behind a critical online post about her, and accidentally pushes him down some stairs during a confrontation. Finn does not pursue legal action against Elly, as he still loves her. They soon get back together. Xanthe discovers that Finn has a brain aneurysm, and he asks that she is his spy at school. Finn keeps notes on Susan's failings, and encourages her grandson to leave school. He applies for the acting assistant principal position. He uses his relationship with Elly to get Susan removed from the interview board, citing a conflict of interest. Elly breaks up with Finn, as she is unable to trust him, and he is asked to stop tutoring Xanthe, but they continue to meet in secret.

Finn alters several grades on essays Elly has marked, leading to an investigation. He also swaps Susan's vitamins for Piper Willis's pain medication, which leads to Susan having an MS relapse, and he manipulates Xanthe into keeping quiet about it. While Susan is in hospital, Finn becomes acting principal and he attempts to force Elly out, after learning she spoke to his wife, Miranda Kelly (Dajana Cahill). His new teaching scheme is disliked by the teachers and students, who start a protest. The medication swap is also discovered, so Finn flees town and boards a plane to Hong Kong. Xanthe follows him, but they are soon brought back by federal police. Finn then frames Xanthe for the medication swap. She later meets with him and secretly records a confession. Finn's aneurysm haemorrhages and he undergoes surgery. He claims he is paralysed when he wakes up, and later accuses Elly of trying to smother him. Finn is found to be faking his paralysis and he confesses to his crimes. He is visited by Elly, Xanthe and Susan, who realises that he is not truly remorseful for his actions. Finn is then transferred to a prison hospital.

Finn returns to Erinsborough with his girlfriend and Elly's younger sister, Bea Nilsson. Bea knows Finn as Patrick and believes he is reliant on a wheelchair, after he saved her from being harassed by a group of men, who then assaulted him. Finn convinces Bea to spend time with her estranged family and befriend Xanthe. He also encourages her to accept a job at the local garage, which he later accesses to sabotage some invoices, so she gets into trouble with her boss. Finn berates Bea for talking to her family about him, but he gifts her a dress similar to one owned by Elly as an apology. Finn gains access to Susan's medical file after becoming an intern for an MS trial at the hospital run by Karl Kennedy. When Bea comes home early and finds Finn's empty wheelchair, she calls him in a panic and he tells her that he has been regaining movement in his legs, but fell when he went out. Sensing Bea is sceptical, Finn proposes to her and Bea accepts on the condition that he meets her family. However, Finn pulls out of the gathering at the last minute.

Finn gifts Bea's family a tea chest, in which he has placed a hidden camera. Finn alters the data in the MS trial leading to false positive results. He contacts the hospital's COO, who shuts down the trial. Finn acquires the clues for a local scavenger hunt he knows Xanthe is taking part in. He sees what Elly is wearing that day and provides Bea with an identical outfit, before suggesting they enter the scavenger hunt. Finn makes sure Bea is seen on CCTV cameras around town, before claiming he needs to return to the apartment as he is in pain. He later goes out and lures Elly to a national park using Bea's phone, so he can steal her car. He locates Xanthe and hits her at full speed with the car. Finn and Bea drive to Maryborough to get married, but Bea starts to become suspicious and pulls the car over. She gets out and Finn chases after her, revealing that he never needed the wheelchair. Susan and Elly later locate Bea's car and come face to face with Finn, who locks them in a shipping container with Bea. The women are eventually rescued, and Finn is believed to have fled the country. While on the run, Finn is assisted by Harry Sinclair (Paul Dawber), a principal from a school he previously taught at, and whose feelings he is manipulating.

Months later, Bea finds Finn at a cabin in the bush, and he taunts her with her stolen therapist's file. Finn chases Bea through the bush and finds her with Elly, Susan and Xanthe at the edge of a cliff. Susan pushes Finn over the edge in self defence. He is later found and taken to the hospital, where he remains in a coma. Weeks later, several students and teachers fall ill from hydrogen cyanide poisoning, and it emerges that Finn placed canisters of cyanide in the air vents to kill those attending the school's graduation ceremony. Finn wakes from his coma with amnesia; he believes he is 19 and about to take his teaching exams. Finn receives several visitors, including Susan, Bea and his half-brother Shaun Watkins (Brad Moller). Karl suspects Finn is faking the amnesia and tells him about his crimes. Finn attempts to flee the hospital, but he collapses in the car park. Finn's mother Claudia Watkins (Kate Raison) reluctantly visits him, and suggests that he severs ties with Shaun. She later offers to pay his legal fees and keeps a photo of him from an album he made her.

All of the physical evidence in Finn's case is destroyed in a fire, so Shaun tries to convince him to change his plea, but his lawyer Imogen Willis refuses to represent him at his sentencing hearing if he does. Finn saves Susan and Imogen from being hit by a speeding car, and Miranda is the prime suspect because Finn rejected her. Both Susan and Bea change their statements at the hearing, as they believe Finn is no longer the same man who hurt them. Elly also gives a less damning statement, which results in Finn receiving a non-custodial sentence. Elly suggests that the Kennedys house Finn, and they agree, despite the tension it causes with the neighbours. Finn becomes the subject of a case study for David Tanaka (Takaya Honda). He and Karl also deliver some home grown fruit to the neighbours, but razorblades are found inside and Finn is blamed. He later makes an anonymous donation to the Sonya Foundation. Finn realises his presence is causing problems for the Kennedys and he decides to leave town, but Bea finds and convinces him to return.

Finn deduces that Elly is pregnant with Shaun's child and that she is being blackmailed by Dean Mahoney (Henry Strand). He pays Dean to change schools and tells Elly he will support her, as she keeps the truth from her husband, Mark Brennan. Finn is accused of planting cyanide canisters at the community centre during the Sonya Foundation launch; however, Ned Willis comes forward and reveals that Harry is responsible. Harry was also behind the attempted hit-and-run and the razorblades in the fruit. When Finn sees Harry, he suddenly remembers who he is and fears that his memories are returning. Harry eventually tells Finn that the memory he has is of their first meeting when Finn was an 18-year-old student. Finn encourages Elly to tell Mark the truth about the baby, as it is causing her stress. Bea and Finn grow closer and almost kiss. Finn begins teaching adult education classes at the Sonya Foundation.

Finn rescues Bea from intruder Alfie Sutton, who threatens to tell the police that Finn was violent with him. Finn admits that he was protective of Bea because he loves her. She admits that she is falling for him too and they start dating in secret, until Ned catches them kissing on the way back from a date. They decide to tell Bea's family, who worry that she will get hurt again. Finn develops anxiety after Bea recalls a memory of Patrick, and he struggles to move their relationship forward. Bea comes up with a striptease game and they consummate their relationship. Alfie breaks into the house again and steals clothes. Finn and Bea tell Karl and Susan about Alfie and they ask Finn to go to the police if he wants to continue staying with them. Finn is kept overnight at the station, while the police speak to Alfie. When Alfie's statement says Finn punched him, Finn has to go to a remand centre and he has a panic attack. Toadie convinces the DPP to place Finn under house arrest instead. The DPP later determine Alfie's assault claim is false.

Finn becomes concerned about how much Elly is talking to Shaun about the baby, and her relationship with Chloe Brennan (April Rose Pengilly). Finn calls Shaun when he falls out with David and Aaron Brennan (Matt Wilson) over their involvement in Elly's pregnancy. Shaun comes to Erinsborough to pull Finn into line. He apologises to David and Aaron, and the four take a baby swaddling class together. Shaun and Finn come up with an idea for the Foundation that pairs disadvantaged children with mentors. They present their idea to Toadie, who informs them that Finn will not receive police clearance to work with children due to his past. Shaun returns to Switzerland and Finn later learns that he is missing presumed dead after being struck by an avalanche. Bea helps him and Elly grieve by arranging a memorial in the park. Finn violates his parole when he steps into school grounds to give Elly some pain medication. He startles student Olivia Lane (Grace O'Sullivan), who goes missing shortly after, forcing him to confess to the police and costing Elly her job.

Finn bonds with Elly over the baby and offers her financial help. He finds a photo album of pictures from when they dated and keeps it, leading Susan to confront him about his feelings for Elly. Claudia returns to Erinsborough under the pretence of wanting to see him and bond with Elly, but Finn discovers that she hired a private investigator to dig up dirt on Elly's past. She asks him to watch Elly and report back to her, but Finn refuses. Claudia reveals to Finn that she was behind the fire that destroyed the evidence in his case, and then informs Bea of Finn's growing feelings towards Elly. Bea confronts Finn and Elly, who assure her that there is nothing between them. Finn helps deliver Elly's daughter Aster Conway (Isla Goulas; Scout Bowman) while they are being held hostage by Robert Robinson (Adam Hunter). Susan later catches the two having a moment and confronts them, reminding them that Bea must not be hurt. Elly moves into Number 32, but she asks for Finn's help when she has difficulties settling Aster. Wanting to prove how much he loves Bea, Finn proposes to her, but she turns him down. Finn explains that he wanted Bea to feel loved and it strengthens their relationship.

Finn tutors Harlow Robinson (Jemma Donovan) in psychology, which raises the subject of his father, an alcoholic from whom he is estranged. Bea contacts Finn's father Trent Kelly (Peter Houghton), and she and Elly meet with him. They tell Finn that Trent lost the ransom money that would have led to his release from the Colombian kidnappers. Finn distances himself from Bea and relies on Elly's support, culminating in a kiss, which triggers some of Finn's memories to return. As the rest of his memories come back, Finn makes a video diary to help him cope. He struggles with his anger after becoming embroiled in a feud with Lucy Robinson (Melissa Bell), who bans him from attending Lassiters' events. Finn is invited to Elly's 35th birthday party on Pierce Greyson's (Tim Robards) island, after Toadie agrees to act as his guardian. Prior to leaving, he visits Harry Sinclair in prison to ask about a storage locker they owned. He also meets with Trent and attacks him, having remembered that Trent actually gambled the ransom money away. Finn declares his love for Elly and informs her of his intent to break up with Bea after returning. His original personality is fully restored when he returns to the storage locker and finds a map for the island, where he plans to kill Bea.

When Lucy spots Finn at the Lassiters Wedding Expo, she asks him to leave and insults him. He then makes a bomb and places it inside a box containing Lucy's honeymoon destination, which will be opened after her wedding. Lucy switches the boxes, and the bomb instead kills Harlow's mother, Prue Wallace (Denise van Outen). On the island, Finn takes Bea on a hike and pushes her down an old mineshaft, causing her to break her leg. He tells Elly that he broke up with Bea and she left for Sydney. Learning that Harry arrived after being paroled and filmed him pushing Bea down the mine, Finn seduces Harry to keep him on side and asks that he finds them somewhere to hide once he is done on the island. Toadie finds the dinghy that Bea supposedly took off from the island, so Finn hits him with a rock, places him in the dingy, punctures the bottom of it and pushes it into the sea. Discovering that Bea is still alive and Harlow is now trapped with her, Finn places a deadly snake in the mine, which bites Harlow. When Gary Canning (Damien Richardson) tries to rescue them, Finn shoots and kills him with an arrow. Elly discovers Bea's and Toadie's phones in Finn's possession and flees with Aster, discovering Gary's body. Finn finds them, kidnaps Aster, and leaves the island after setting it on fire.

Returning to Erinsborough, Finn lies to Susan that Bea is at a cabin in the woods and convinces her to help him persuade her to come home. However he soon admits his memories have returned and tells Susan he wants them to start a new life together, as she has cared for him more than anyone else. When Susan tries to call the police, Finn ties her up and digs a grave for her in the woods, but slips climbing out and hits his head on a rock, paralysing him. The water he used to soften the ground then fills the grave, drowning him. After finding and rescuing Susan and Aster, Elly finds Finn's body and attempts to bury him when the police arrive. She is charged with his murder, which is later downgraded to voluntary manslaughter. Finn reappears as Susan watches his video diaries and visualises him, so she can understand his state of mind and motives for the events that led up to his death. Susan later uses a visualisation technique to get closure over Finn and Finn begins being constantly reimagined in her mind for a little while. Susan imagines Finn once again in 2022 during a Ramsay Street party when she is thinking of people who are no longer with them. Whilst she reflects on the others as people who have been lost, she suggests that Finn was someone who was "just lost".

== Reception ==
"Finn was certainly one character we weren't expecting to see again! But as Susan pondered life on Ramsay Street, she remembered the troubled villain as a lost soul. Mills's portrayal as the complex Finn ran through until 2020, before he was killed off for good. As traumatic as Finn's reign of terror was, it's important to remember the good and the bad, Susan remarked. And that's exactly the attitude needed to celebrate Neighbours' 37 year run."

— Laura Denby from Radio Times on Finn's brief 2022 return.

For his portrayal of Finn, Mills was longlisted for Best Daytime Star at the 2019 Inside Soap Awards. A critic for The Advertiser was pleased with Mills' introduction, saying "Love seeing a familiar face join Neighbours. Rob Mills is the latest arrival in Ramsay Street, where there are few career options other than doctor, mechanic, barista or villain. Luckily, Erinsborough High always needs teachers. Cue Finn (Mills), a handsome, charismatic chap with a some juicy secrets in his past." The Herald Sun's Anna Brain commented "But of course no new character can be taken at face value; we soon learn that Finn carries some complicated and mysterious baggage."

Of Mills' acting skills in the role, Bridget McManus of The Sydney Morning Herald observed: "As Flynn [sic], the new bespectacled teacher with wild ideas about bringing mindfulness into the classroom, Mills is no better or worse than any of his colleagues. He appears to have already mastered the skill of conducting outwardly jovial yet inwardly fraught exchanges from a cafe chair." In his assessment of the character, Johnathon Hughes of Radio Times found that "on the surface, handsome Finn is charming, charismatic and an excellent addition to the school". He went onto name Finn as "one of the nastiest characters Neighbours has ever seen" for his scheming and grooming of Xanthe. He also thought Finn's obsession with Elly added "more menace to his wicked agenda", and branded him a "toxic teacher". Hughes added, "We're not used to this level of evil in sunny Erinsborough". Hughes later called Finn a "psychotic villain", "power-mad" and an "arch-manipulator".

Alison James of Soaplife dubbed Finn "too power-mad for his own good". Mills found himself being verbally abused in the street for his portrayal of the character. McManus (The Sydney Morning Herald) thought that more time should have been spent on Finn's reintroduction storyline, saying "there's a sense that Rob Mills' storyline as wicked Finn, which tonight takes a dramatic turn in the bush, deserved a bit more time. Instead, some reckless decisions are made without due attention to detail or diction." A reporter for the South Wales Echo observed that "Finn seems to be a magnet for problems" since his return. Similarly, Radio Times' Simon Timblick opined "after all the terrible things Finn Kelly (played by Rob Mills) has done in Neighbours, you'd think he’d be thrown in prison for a ker-zillion years." However, Charlie Milward of the Daily Express said the redeemed Finn "has proven to be a reputable young man", whose "charismatic ways" made Bea fall for him again.

The character's redemption arc and promotion to the regular cast was polarising among viewers. Digital Spy's Conor McMullan defended the storyline and implored viewers to give it a chance. He believed that the "numerous contrivances" to help Finn avoid prison was the problem for many viewers, who thought their "suspension of disbelief is being pushed too far." But McMullan said while the plot was not perfect, the conflicts were "fresh ground" for the show, while "the moral grey area that the story has been exploring is an interesting one – and certainly caused a lot of conversation." McMullan liked that Mills had the opportunity to show "a new side" to Finn and found himself feeling sorry for him. He concluded that the character's amnesia had potential for several future storylines, adding "Could he end up being one of the finest residents Ramsay Street has ever seen or will we find out that a leopard can't change their spots? Finn winning everyone around, just as he turns to the dark side again, is a thrilling thought for the future..."

The changes to Finn's persona led McManus (The Sydney Morning Herald) to observe that "bad boy Finn has turned everyday hero". She also wrote, "If only people did 360 degree personality turns the way they do on Neighbours, the world would be a more cohesive place."
