= Waiting Room =

A waiting room is a place where people sit or stand until the event they are waiting for occurs.

Waiting Room(s) or The Waiting Room(s) may also refer to:

== Film, TV and theatre ==
- The Waiting Room (2007 film), a 2007 British film starring Anne-Marie Duff
- The Waiting Room (2010 film), a 2010 Hindi film directed by Maneej Premnath
- The Waiting Room (2012 film), a 2012 documentary film and social media project directed by Peter Nicks
- The Waiting Room (2015 film), a 2015 Canadian film
- The Waiting Room (2018 film), a 2018 Australian film directed by Molly Reynolds.
- The Waiting Room (TV series), a 2008 Australian observational documentary
- The Waiting Room, a 2000 play by Tanika Gupta

== Music ==
- Waiting Room (band), an Australian rock band

=== Albums ===
- The Waiting Room, a 2002 album by Poor Old Lu
- The Waiting Room (Tindersticks album), 2016
- The Waiting Room (John Mann album), 2014
- Waiting Rooms (album), a 1997 album by Simon Warner
- The Waiting Room, a 2005 album by Emanon
- The Waiting Room (EP), a 1983 EP by Do-Ré-Mi
- Waiting Room (album), a 2025 album by Kathryn Mohr

=== Songs ===
- "Waiting Room" (song), a 1988 song by Fugazi
- "Waiting Room", a song from No Doubt's 2001 album Rock Steady
- "Waiting Room", a 2016 song by Phoebe Bridgers
- "Waiting Room", a song from Rex Orange County's 2017 studio album Apricot Princess
- "The Waiting Room", a song from Genesis' 1974 album The Lamb Lies Down on Broadway
