= List of Neighbours characters introduced in 2020 =

Neighbours is an Australian television soap opera. It was first broadcast on 18 March 1985 and airs on digital channel 10 Peach. The following is a list of characters that first appeared in the show in 2020, by order of first appearance. All characters were introduced by the show's executive producer Jason Herbison. Lisa Rowsthorn and Zenin Alexio were introduced towards the end of January. Owen Campbell, Emmett Donaldson, Levi Canning, and Louis Curtain made their debuts in June. Brent Colefax and Nicolette Stone began appearing from July, while Rose Walker made her debut in August. Nathan Packard was introduced in November, followed by Jay Rebecchi.

== Lisa Rowsthorn ==
Lisa Rowsthorn
- Neighbours character
- Portrayed by: Jane Allsop
- Duration: 2020, 2022
- First appearance: 20 January 2020
- Last appearance: 6 July 2022
- Introduced by: Jason Herbison
In-universe information
- Sons: Hendrix Greyson
- Daughters: Alana Greyson; Maeve Rowsthorn

Lisa Rowsthorn, played by Jane Allsop, made her first appearance on 20 January 2020. Details of Allsop's casting as Lisa were announced on 13 January. The character is the mother of Hendrix Greyson (Ben Turland) and arrives in Erinsborough to help with his rebellious behaviour, which resulted in him stealing a nude photo of his stepmother Chloe Brennan (April Rose Pengilly). Hendrix finds his mother is "surprisingly reasonable and understanding" about the incident, while Hendrix's father Pierce Greyson (Tim Robards) fears for his relationship with his son, knowing that Lisa is "controlling". Daniel Kilkelly of Digital Spy reported that Lisa's introduction would also test Pierce and Chloe's marriage, as she asks Pierce to father another child with her. In March 2022, Allsop and Robards reprised their roles for a storyline set and filmed in Sydney.

Lisa flies to Erinsborough, after being contacted by Chloe Brennan, who has concerns about her son Hendrix's behaviour. Lisa learns that Hendrix has been living with the Kennedy family and not with his father, Pierce, but she is accepting of the situation. Lisa deduces that Hendrix did not tell her himself because he was embarrassed about why he was there – his crush on Chloe. Lisa gives Hendrix the chance to come back home with her, but he tells her that he wants to stay and make things right. Lisa wants to tell Hendrix about the deal between herself and Pierce, as she realises that Hendrix has spent his life thinking Pierce did not care about him. Hendrix overhears them arguing and Lisa explains that Pierce was only 18 when they dated, and they broke up shortly after he was born. Lisa later asked Pierce to father another child with her through IVF for money, which helped him set up his business. She gave him access to Hendrix and his sister Alana, but told him to focus on his own life, as she did not need him. Hendrix is hurt by the revelation. Lisa admits to Chloe that she thought she was doing the right thing. She then asks about Chloe and Pierce's plans to have a family, but Chloe reveals that she has Huntington's disease, which complicates matters.

Hendrix later moves back in with Chloe and Pierce, but his relationship with Lisa remains strained. Pierce demands honesty from Lisa and she reveals that she wants another child and for it to be Pierce's. Lisa explains that she is willing to move to Erinsborough with Alana and co-parent the child with Pierce and Chloe. They initially agree to Lisa's idea, but Chloe realises it is not what she wants and they inform Lisa. Chloe's brother Aaron Brennan (Matt Wilson) and his husband David Tanaka (Takaya Honda) later ask Lisa if she would have and co-parent a child with them. David's father Paul Robinson (Stefan Dennis) is against the idea and asks Lisa to put a stop to it, as he does not want the boys to get hurt. Lisa takes a pregnancy test and learns she is pregnant with her former boyfriend's baby. She tells David and Aaron that their plan cannot go ahead, before telling Pierce, Chloe and Hendrix. She decides to leave for Sydney right away to tell her ex, James, the news. Hendrix comes to see her before she goes and she tells him that she is proud of him. She knows that being with his father is the right thing for him and she will be calling him every chance she can get. A few months later, Lisa messages Pierce to let him know that she has given birth to a daughter, Maeve Rowsthorn (Beatrix Van Vliet).

Two years later, Hendrix visits Sydney with his girlfriend, Mackenzie Hargreaves (Georgie Stone), and tells Lisa and his sister that he has been diagnosed with pulmonary fibrosis and requires a lung transplant. After Hendrix proposes to Mackenzie, Lisa attends their wedding and wishes Hendrix good luck before his operation a few days after. Lisa learns that Hendrix's operation was successful, but his antibodies are rejecting the new lung. She, Pierce and Mackenzie say goodbye to him before he dies. Lisa yells publicly at Sadie Rodwell (Emerald Chan), who was responsible for the fire that caused Hendrix's initial disease and Lisa speaks at his funeral a week later.

== Zenin Alexio ==
Zenin Alexio
- Neighbours character
- Portrayed by: Axle Whitehead
- First appearance: 24 January 2020
- Last appearance: 17 February 2020
- Introduced by: Jason Herbison

Zenin Alexio, played by Axle Whitehead, made his first appearance on 24 January 2020. Whitehead's casting was reported in the 18–24 January 2020 issue of Inside Soap. He joins the cast for a short stint as "a shady looking guy" who watches Yashvi Rebecchi (Olivia Junkeer) and Ned Willis (Ben Hall) in the local café, leading to speculation about his identity and interest in the couple. It was later confirmed that Zenin is linked to an illegal fight ring that Ned was involved with in late 2019. Hall explained, "Zenin is under the impression that Ned and Yashvi are on to his illegal operations, which were taking place behind the scenes at the fight club. Zenin threatens to hurt Yashvi, and anyone Ned is close to, if either of them goes to the cops." Hall said Whitehead "brought great energy" to his character, and he hoped Whitehead would stay with the cast for a while. Whitehead later said of Zenin: "My character is very dangerous, and he's someone who takes pleasure in threatening people. He enjoys the hunt, the game of cat-and-mouse, and he'll stop at nothing. Human life is cheap to him." Whitehead explained that playing a bad boy character was his favourite and called Zenin "a truly bad guy". He also said that he enjoyed playing out the hostage scenes involving Ned, as they involved a lot of action. He added that he would love to come back if viewers wanted to see more of Zenin.

Zenin comes to Harold's Café and listens in as Ned Willis and Yashvi Rebecchi talk about her police academy exam. He makes a phone call and tells the person at the other end that they might have a problem. He briefly makes eye contact with Ned on his way out, and later follows him to Ramsay Street. Zenin breaks into Ned's home and is waiting for him when he returns. Ned works out that Zenin is connected with a fight ring he was involved in, however, when Zenin asks him what he saw while he was there, Ned does not know what he is talking about. Zenin brings up Yashvi and believes that Ned told her what he saw, as the police have been investigating. He tells Ned to make sure Yashvi keeps quiet and he leaves. Zenin later meets with Ned, who explains that his lawyer Toadfish Rebecchi (Ryan Moloney) has a written statement from him containing everything he knows, so if he or Yashvi are hurt, then it will be given to the police. Zenin then sabotages Yashvi's car, and sends Ned a text saying that he has seen his lawyer talking to the police. Toadie's office is broken into and Ned meets with Zenin, who threatens to break into Toadie's home, where Yashvi also lives, to search for the statement. Kyle Canning (Chris Milligan) meets Zenin to exchange money for a 3D printed gun, and Zenin later texts Yashvi to say he is glad she has joined the team and gives her a job to do. Ned finds the text and contacts Zenin, who tells him that Yashvi approached him begging him to keep her family safe. Ned asks to take Yashvi's place but Zenin is not interested. Zenin later catches Ned at his warehouse and is about to shoot him when the police and Yashvi arrive. Zenin grabs Ned and holds him hostage, so Yashvi goes over to the waiting van and pushes the horn, causing Zenin to fire the gun into the air and allowing the police to arrest him. Ned then learns Yashvi was working with a police task force to catch Zenin and his associates.

== Gavin Bowman ==
Gavin Bowman, played by Cameron MacDonald, made his first appearance on 31 March 2020 and was then credited as Dr. Bowman. He returned on 6 May 2024. Gavin works as a doctor and a psychiatrist at Erinsborough Hospital and is assigned to treat Haz Devkar (Shiv Palekar) after he is hit by a car. Daniel Kilkelly from Digital Spy reported that Gavin would be featured in a storyline with Remi Varga-Murphy (Naomi Rukavina) and that Gavin is a "new villain" in the series. Remi is promoted and takes over Karl Kennedy's (Alan Fletcher) former role, Gavin attends their party. Kilkelly added that Gavin makes "sleazy remarks" to Karl about Remi and her wife Cara Varga-Murphy (Sara West). Karl responds by reporting Gavin to HR but does not tell Remi about the incident.

Gavin, in his first appearance, initially appears a psychiatrist who supervises Finn Kelly's (Rob Mills) care after David Tanaka (Takaya Honda) is hit by a ute. After Finn's death, Gavin tells David that the board have asked him whether he knew about the change in Finn's mental state. He also tells David that if there is an inquiry, they may want to question him too. Bowman is later called to give Harlow Robinson (Jemma Donovan) a psych evaluation, but he realises she is actually experiencing withdrawal from the barbiturates used to treat her. Bowman asks David how he could have missed the signs, and David admits that he was too focused on her psychological state. As Bowman suggests David extends his leave of absence, David points out that Bowman missed the changes in Finn's personality too when he was supervising Finn's care after David's accident. Bowman tells David that he was at a distinct disadvantage because of the way David handled the case, and by the time he shared his concerns about Finn it was too late. Bowman adds that David should have listened to his instincts and alerted someone, and coldly tells him that what happened with Finn is on him, which left David feeling devastated after he hears this.

Gavin treats Haz following him being run over by Mackenzie Hargreaves (Georgie Stone) and continues to monitor his condition. Gavin later notices Remi with a job application form for Senior Medical Officer. He asks Remi if she will apply and states that he is not interested in the position. He also questions Remi about her relationship with Cara. Gavin continues to treat Haz and assesses his condition after he wakes from a coma. Gavin attends Karl's leaving party and makes sexualised comments about Remi and Cara, which shocks Karl. The following morning, Karl reports Gavin to the HR department and reveals they were not surprised by his allegations. Gavin treats Dex Varga-Murphy (Marley Williams) after he is poisoned. He discusses the case with Remi and Cara but Karl is worried by his involvement. Gavin is informed about Karl's complaint and confronts him. Karl tells Remi about Gavin's comments, who then tells Cara and they ban him from treating Dex further.

Gavin and Remi have an argument at work and he makes further harsh comments towards Remi. He comes up with a theory about Dex's poisoning and cures him. Gavin later agrees to be interviewed about the medical cases involving the poisonings on Liv Bellen's (Cece Peters) podcast. His appearance causes Holly Hoyland (Lucinda Armstrong Hall) to become suspicious of him and she breaks into the hospital filing system and accesses Gavin's work records. Holly pretends to be working for Liv's podcast and records his views. She then follows him to a community meeting at the foundation and catches Gavin injecting food with poison. Holly stumbles and Gavin takes her hostage, while using a syringe as a weapon.

After taking Holly hostage, Gavin forces her into his flat and destroys her phone. Holly informs him that others know that she's been following him and that Liv is going to reveal on her podcast that he is the serial poisoner who poisoned many people, including Dex. It also comes out to Gavin that she is Karl's daughter. Gavin tries to justify what he did, including the fact it wasn't his intention to kill anyone. Holly points out this confirms her theory on Gavin's motives for being the poisoner: Gavin being the only doctor who was able to cure the victims would be seen in the media as a hero and that would therefore ensure he won't lose his job for sexual harassing women because the hospital won't want the bad publicity for firing him. Gavin drags Holly into the bathroom and forces her to lie in the bath where he ties her up, gags her with a tie and taunts her with the loaded syringe before leaving her there. The following morning, Gavin comes back with a glass of water and tries to get Holly to drink it but she is suspicious of what it might contain so refuses to drink it. Gavin starts to pack up ahead of fleeing the country and tells Holly it's because of her and makes it clear to her how bitter he is that all he's worked for has been ruined because of her and stuffs the tie back into her mouth after ignoring her pleas to let her go along with promising not to tell anyone. Before storming out of the bathroom, he tells Holly she wrecked his life.

Karl becomes concern with Holly's absence and goes to Number 32 to ask Mackenzie and Haz if she is there. Mackenzie tells Karl that she hasn't heard from Holly since the argument they had the previous day about Gavin being the poisoner. Haz then reveals that Terese Willis told him that Gavin didn't appear at the fundraiser he was meant to be attending. After Karl tried to call Gavin on his phone and can't get a hold of him, Mackenzie is left wondering if there's a possibility that Holly could be right about Gavin. Karl then goes to the hospital with fellow neighbour and police officer Andrew Rodwell to look for Gavin but Remi tells them that he's called in sick which she finds strange given that he's due to be commended for his work diagnosing the poisonings. After giving them Gavin's address and being informed of the situation, Remi accompanies them to the complex where Gavin lives and finalise their plan of action. Remi, under the pretense of personally calling round to hand deliver Gavin's letter of commendation, knocks on his door and tries see anything unusual inside once the door is open. Gavin opens the door and Remi asks how he's feeling before explaining why she's calling and further prolongs the conversation by praising him for saving her son. Holly, after having untangled her feet from her restraints, manages to get herself out of the bathroom and into Remi's view. Remi, Andrew and Karl force the door open before Gavin grabs Holly and threatens to jab her with the syringe. Holly employs a self-defence tactic by stamping on Gavin's foot causing him to release the syringe and the grip he had on her. While Holly runs to the safety of Karl, Andrew pounces on Gavin and manages to restrain him after a struggle. With Gavin held securely, Remi rushes forward and grabs the syringe but notices that its empty and realises Gavin has been injected with what was inside it.

At the hospital, thanks to Remi, Andrew reports to her, Cara, Karl, Holly and Leo that Gavin is in a stable condition but under police guard. Andrew also reveals that the glass of water Holly refused to drink was drugged and evidence was found on Gavin's phone that confirms he planned to leave her unconscious somewhere while he fled the country. Andrew confirms that Gavin will be charged with kidnapping, unlawful possession of a controlled substance and poisoning, and will go to jail for it.

A year later, Gavin has been released from prison and went on an internet date with Jane Harris under the name of "Gav". Jane, who never met Gavin personally before, complains about her date with him to Nicolette that it was a disaster and explains that it started off well but in the middle of a conversation the man suddenly made up an excuse to leave that Jane didn't buy. Jane then talks to Terese about the date during tea at Number 22 and on how outrageous the man's behaviour was. She then shows Terese a picture of Gav. Terese reveals to Jane his true identity and that he was the man who poisoned the wine at the Eirini Rising launch and kidnapped Holly last year. While Terese informs Andrew, Wendy, Karl, Remi, Cara, Aaron and Nicolette at Number 30 during a party, Jane goes to confront Gavin outside Harold's Cafe. Gavin admits to Jane that during their date when he realised her connection to Ramsay Street he knew she must be a close friend to the families of Karl and Remi and felt the need to leave. Jane tells him he shouldn't be on dating apps and that by doing so he was preying on women who have no idea about his past. She then tells him that he barely paid for what he has done and to stay away from her and everybody else. At Number 30, after Jane arrives, Andrew informs everyone that Gavin was up for parole and the parole board believed he was rehabilitated. He also reveals that due to an error neither Holly or Dex were on the victim's register which resulted in them not being notified before Gavin's release.

== Owen Campbell ==
Owen Campbell
- Neighbours character
- Portrayed by: Johnny Ruffo
- First appearance: 8 June 2020
- Last appearance: 16 June 2020
- Introduced by: Jason Herbison
In-universe information
- Occupation: Prison guard

Owen Campbell, played by Johnny Ruffo, made his first appearance on 8 June 2020. The character and Ruffo's casting details were announced on 28 May 2020. He filmed his six-episode guest stint in March. Ruffo remarked that the show was "very fast moving" when it came to filming. He said, "I thought Home and Away was quick, but Neighbours was so much quicker. You can't mess around, they were such professionals. I really enjoyed it. It's just Australian royalty, those two shows [Neighbours and Home and Away]. It was such an incredible experience and now I'm fortunate to have been on both shows." Ruffo's character, Owen is a prison guard.

While on duty in the visitation room at Goodwood Women's Prison, Owen meets Dee Bliss (Madeleine West) and recognises that she is related to Andrea Somers (also West) and Heather Schilling (Kerry Armstrong). Owen later goes to Harold Cafe, where Dee buys him coffee and they bond over gardening. Back at the prison, it emerges that Owen is conspiring with Andrea, who has seduced him. Owen gets Dee and Heather accepted onto a visitors gardening program. After their first session, Dee thanks Owen for organising it and he suggests that she schedule another visit soon, as the program is very popular. He tells her there is a spot free in a few days and Dee agrees to book it. Owen later tells Andrea that everything is going according to plan and asks for a shiv that Andrea has hidden. On the day of Dee's visit, Owen plants the shiv on an inmate to force the prison into lockdown. As Dee waits in the garden, Owen gives her some water, which has been drugged, and she passes out. Andrea swaps clothes with her and she escapes the prison with Owen. Andrea collects her son Hugo Somers (John Turner) and hides out at an apartment that Owen has found for them. Owen soon realises that Andrea has been using him when she no longer reciprocates his feelings. He takes some money she asked him to hide and calls Toadfish Rebecchi (Ryan Moloney) to tell him where Andrea is.

== Emmett Donaldson ==
Emmett Donaldson
- Neighbours character
- Portrayed by: Ezra Justin
- Duration: 2020–2021
- First appearance: 10 June 2020
- Last appearance: 28 April 2021
- Introduced by: Jason Herbison
In-universe information
- Occupation: Student
- Mother: Jenna Donaldson
- Half-brothers: Brent Colefax
- Aunts: Linda Donaldson

Emmett Donaldson, played by Ezra Justin, made his first appearance on 10 June 2020. The character and Justins's casting details were confirmed in March 2020. Emmett is introduced as part of a storyline focusing on adoption and fostering. He is fostered by David Tanaka (Takaya Honda) and Aaron Brennan (Matt Wilson). The character's initial episodes were directed by actress Deborra-lee Furness, who founded Adopt Change. Of the plot, she stated "By telling this story through characters that are known and loved by millions really brings the message home as to what it’s like to navigate this world. Kudos to Neighbours for shining a light on so many important issues and championing the stories of outliers and minorities in our communities." Justin reprised the role the following year, as Emmett returns to stay with David and Aaron, along with his brother Brent Colefax (Texas Watterston).

After his foster placement breaks down, due to a fight and school suspension, Emmett's social worker Leila Potts (Jing-Xuan Chan) introduces him to Aaron Brennan and David Tanaka, who agree to take him in for the night. This is later extended to a week. David's father Paul Robinson (Stefan Dennis) gifts Emmett a cricket bat, and he is introduced to Harlow Robinson (Jemma Donovan) and Hendrix Greyson (Benny Turland). Emmett later overhears David and Aaron telling Aaron's sister Chloe Brennan (April Rose Pengilly) and her husband Pierce Greyson (Tim Robards) about how they requested the agency place a younger child with them. Emmett deliberately smashes a window with a cricket ball and runs away. Chloe finds him at the rotunda and contacts Aaron and David, while Hendrix tells Emmett to give them a chance. Leila asks Emmett if he is okay to stay and to promise not to run away again, which he does, but he does not want to stay longer than a week. Aaron and David buy Emmett some new trainers and throw his old worn out pair away, but he retrieves them from the bin and Ned Willis (Ben Hall) fixes them up for him. Aaron and David apologise to Emmett for overstepping and not asking his opinion first. Emmett later asks if he can stay longer. The foster agency arrange a driver to pick Emmett up from his school, as it is an hour away, but when the driver fails to show, Emmett calls Aaron before his phone battery dies. Thinking that no one is coming, he attempts to catch a bus, but soon finds Aaron has sent Paul to pick him up. Emmett decides to move to Erinsborough High to makes things easier. He meets new counsellor Shaun Watkins (Brad Moller) on his first day, and Shaun helps him with his nine times table when Emmett leaves his maths class, after struggling with a question. He is later told that he may have to repeat Year 8 and Shaun becomes his tutor.

Emmett struggles to make friends, but he impresses classmate Louis Curtain (Declan Dennis) when he takes the blame for trashing a school classroom. He tries to befriend Louis again by letting him use Hendrix's drone. Louis uses it to spy on Roxy Willis (Zima Anderson) sunbathing in her garden, but when he loses control and ends up injuring Sheila Canning (Colette Mann), Louis runs away, leaving Emmett to take the blame. Roxy confronts him for spying on her in front of David and Aaron. Emmett tells Aaron and David the truth, and they forbid him from spending time with Louis again. Despite doing extra homework, Emmett struggles with a maths test and clashes with teacher Marty Muggleton (Nikolai Egel). Emmett's half-brother Brent Colefax (Texas Watterston) comes to Erinsborough to see him, but proves to be trouble when he tells Emmett not to worry about school. He also tells Emmett that he can move in with him once he turns 18, but Aaron and David point out that it would be hard for Brent to care for Emmett. Emmett wants Aaron and David to foster Brent as well and they agree to consider it. Brent encourages Emmett to climb on the roof of the house with him, but when Emmett tries to get down, he slips and falls. Emmett suffers a fracture in his neck and some swelling on his spinal cord leaves him unable to feel his legs, but David assures him and Aaron that he will be fine. Emmett returns home from Erinsborough Hospital shortly before Brent is asked to leave for being inappropriate with Harlow. Brent contacts their mother Jenna Donaldson (Anna Lise Phillips) and she turns up to see Emmett. She tells him she is sober and has broken up with her partner. However, Jenna later shows up drunk having received money from Paul to leave. Jenna secures a job at Lassiter's Hotel and arranges to have lunch with Emmett, who finds bottles of alcohol in her bag. She tells him that she is not drinking again, she was just moving them from one room to another and left them in her bag. Jenna is later fired from the hotel. She tries to tell Emmett that David and Aaron are turning him against her and that they will be together soon, but Emmett asks her to stop lying. Jenna leaving, telling Emmett that she will see him soon. A couple of days later, Leila informs David and Aaron that Emmett's aunt Linda Donaldson (Amelia Best) has returned from New Zealand and is available to foster Emmett and Brent. Jenna also turns up having heard the news, and tries to influence Emmett into leaving. He eventually decides to leave for his aunt's house that day. David and Aaron tell Emmett that they understand and that they will miss him. Emmett says his goodbyes in the street and asks David and Aaron to come visit some time, before leaving with Leila.

Emmett returns the following year and explains to Paul that he no longer wants to live with Linda. He confronts David and Aaron, who are more than happy to take Emmett back into their home, but they first must get permission from Leila. Leila luckily grants them permission and Emmett goes back into the care of David and Aaron. Brent - who was also living with David and Aaron again - runs away, so Paul comes into contact with Jenna and requests for her to take full-time care of her son again, feeling that would be the right decision for Emmett. Jenna asks her son if he'd like to move to New Zealand with her. Emmett agrees to leave and bids his farewell to Paul, Terese Willis, Chloe, Nicolette Stone, Harlow, David and Aaron, before leaving Erinsborough with his mother.

== Levi Canning ==
Levi Canning, played by Richie Morris, made his first appearance on 15 June 2020. Morris's casting was announced on 5 June. He relocated from Sydney to Melbourne to accommodate filming and Neighbours marks his first television role. He called his first day on set "surreal". Levi is a member of the established Canning family and a series regular. He is Sheila Canning's (Colette Mann) grandson and cousin to Kyle Canning (Chris Milligan). Morris was glad to be joining the family, stating that it was "humbling because they are such a fun and iconic family on Ramsay Street, which provides not only loads of drama but also so much humour. I couldn't ask for more. Plus, I get to work and learn from both Chris and Colette, who I idolise." Morris later confirmed that Levi is Frank Canning Jr.'s son, and he was raised by him and his wife Jackie. Levi is the show's new police constable. Morris admitted that the uniform helped him get into character and mindset of a policeman. He also hoped he would get a chance to use his martial arts skills while playing Levi in the future. Morris described his character as "very passionate, very cheeky and charming, and he takes his job very seriously." He added that Levi has a lot of secrets. The character's mother, Evelyn Farlow (Paula Arundell) was introduced in August 2021 to further explore his fictional backstory.

== Louis Curtain ==
Louis Curtain
- Neighbours character
- Portrayed by: Declan Dennis
- Duration: 2020–2022
- First appearance: 26 June 2020
- Last appearance: 24 February 2022
- Introduced by: Jason Herbison
In-universe information
- Occupation: High school student

Louis Curtain, played by Declan Dennis, made his first appearance on 26 June 2020. The character and Dennis's casting details were announced on 6 May 2020. Dennis is the son of actor Stefan Dennis, who plays Paul Robinson in the show. He said his son secured the part on his own, although he acted as "the dad taxi". Their characters do not share any scenes during Declan's two week guest role. Helen Daly of Radio Times called Louis "Erinsborough's latest villain". Asked whether his father helped him get into character, Dennis said "Dad didn't so much help me just play 'the bad guy' it was more about helping me develop the character as a whole. But it is fun being a bit of a chip off the old block." Following his initial guest stint, Dennis made further brief appearances in 2021 and 2022.

Emmett Donaldson (Ezra Justin) attempts to befriend Louis by asking him to hang out over the school holidays, but Louis tells him to stick to his old friends, as no one at Erinsborough High rates him. A few days later, Louis meets Emmett outside Grease Monkeys and teases him about his lack of friends and spending time at the school during the holiday. When Louis learns that Emmett has access to the empty school, he asks him to hang out and trashes a classroom. Louis later learns that Emmett took the blame for him. Louis comes to Ramsay Street to spend the afternoon with Emmett, who borrows Hendrix Greyson's (Benny Turland) drone for them to use. Louis flies it above the street and spots Roxy Willis (Zima Anderson) sunbathing in her garden. He flies the drone closer to spy on Roxy, who throws something at it and causes some damage. Louis loses control of the drone and it strikes Sheila Canning (Colette Mann) in the face. Louis then runs off, leaving Emmett to take the blame. Emmett tells Aaron and David what happened, and they ban Emmett from hanging out with Louis. At the start of the next school year, Louis sees Karl Kennedy (Alan Fletcher) bring Hendrix his lunch and laughs, prompting Hendrix to ask what his problem is. Louis tells Hendrix that he cannot believe how much of a loser he has turned into since being dumped by his girlfriend and forced to repeat Year 12. The following year, Louis tries to impress Zara Selwyn (Freya Van Dyke) and friends by throwing sugar packets across the room at Harold's Café. Toadfish Rebecchi (Ryan Moloney) comes over to speak to Zara and takes the jar of packets away, telling Louis that he has had enough target practice. Louis later joins in when his class starts filming their teacher Jane Harris (Annie Jones) for a joke.

== Brent Colefax ==
Brent Colefax
- Neighbours character
- Portrayed by: Texas Watterston
- Duration: 2020–2021
- First appearance: 13 July 2020
- Last appearance: 14 October 2021
- Introduced by: Jason Herbison
In-universe information
- Occupation: Student; ADF soldier
- Mother: Jenna Donaldson
- Half-brothers: Emmett Donaldson
- Aunts: Linda Donaldson

Brent Colefax, played by Texas Watterston, made his first appearance on 13 July 2020. Watterston's casting was confirmed by his acting agency. Watterston was originally contracted for eight episodes, but ended up filming around 50 episodes after being brought back by producers. Matt Wilson, who plays Aaron Brennan, hoped that Watterston and Justin Ezra, who plays Brent's half-brother Emmett Donaldson, would become series regulars, calling them both "great performers". In October 2021, Watterston told Digital Spy's Daniel Kilkelly that he was happy playing a guest role, as it allowed him to pursue other jobs. He explained, "I think at the moment Brent's a perfect guest role character. He comes in and out when he wants and he makes his impact on screen." Watterston said he would consider joining the serial on a permanent basis if he were asked, as he was interested in what the writers would do with Brent. Watterston was proud of his character's development throughout his duration, saying "Brent came from a background of being really troubled, with no father figure or anyone to help him. And now he's in the army! His whole personality has had to switch." Watterston thought Brent still retained his cheeky side, but he had become more mature.

Brent feuds with Hendrix Greyson (Benny Turland) over Harlow Robinson (Jemma Donovan). Watterston told a TV Week writer: "Brent wanted nothing to do with school, until he heard Hendrix was repeating Year 12. That's when he had the master plan to make Hendrix's last year of school a living hell. Oh, and of course to impress Harlow." Writers later established a romantic relationship between Brent and Harlow. Donovan admitted to being surprised when she learned the characters would kiss. She worked with the writers to make sure the story was told "appropriately and truthfully". She said: "I think there was a genuine want for change from Brent and it was shown through his actions. For Harlow, that was promising and could also see that he wanted to do good and move forward. She kisses him impulsively and she suddenly freaks that she isn't ready and then pulls back. She questions herself, is this really what she wants?" The character departed in May 2021, but Watterston briefly reprised the role that October, as Brent returns to Erinsborough to visit Harlow. However, he realises how much she has changed and breaks up with her. Watterston told Alice Penwill of Inside Soap that Brent is so surprised by Harlow's personality change that their relationship "begins to spiral". He described them as being on "different levels", and when Harlow makes it clear she is not happy with Brent, he "keeps his cool", which Watterston thought would surprise viewers. At the end of his guest stint, Watterston stated "Even though my character can only go so far, I still feel as though there's a storyline for Brent." He added that he would return in the future if he were asked.

Brent is Emmett Donaldson's older half-brother, who comes to Erinsborough to see him. He meets Emmett's foster parents David Tanaka (Takaya Honda) and Aaron Brennan (Wilson), and tells them that as soon as he turns 18 he wants Emmett to live with him. David and Aaron question whether he is ready for that kind of responsibility. Brent encourages Emmett to sneak out to the city with him, angering Aaron who went out to get them dinner. He plans to take Brent back to his care home, but Brent refuses to go back, so Aaron says he can stay the night. Brent flees when David and Aaron tell him that Emmett will unlikely be allowed to live with him. Aaron finds him at the Lassiter's complex and Brent says that he and David will let Emmett down, just like the other foster carers, but Aaron assures him that it will not happen. Brent convinces Emmett to climb onto the roof of the house, but when Aaron catches them coming down, Emmett falls and suffers a spinal injury. At Erinsborough Hospital, David's father Paul Robinson (Stefan Dennis) blames Brent for Emmett's accident, prompting Harlow Robinson to apologise for his outburst. She tells Brent that they are just worried about Emmett. David and Aaron invite Brent to stay with them, but are frustrated when he does not clean up after himself. Brent visits Harlow and asks her out on a date, but when she turns him down, he gets aggressive and threatens her. David and Aaron confront him and Brent starts throwing items around the kitchen, before he elbows Aaron in the face. Brent has to return to the care home, and he is packing up his belongings when his mother Jenna Donaldson (Anna Lise Phillips) comes to see him and Emmett. Aaron tells Brent that he can visit any time, while Brent promises to call Emmett every day. He also tells his mother that he will think about her offer to live with her when he turns 18.

Brent returns to Erinsborough the following year and hides out in Aaron and David's garden bar, The Dug Out. The couple find him sleeping rough and offer him a place to stay, much to Paul's annoyance. After some reluctance, Brent agrees to return to school to complete Year 12. On his first day, he clashes with Hendrix Grayson, Harlow's ex-boyfriend who is also repeating and the two begin a feud. Hendrix becomes increasingly annoyed with Brent spending time with Harlow and the two fight. After Brent breaks Hendrix's laptop, Susan Kennedy (Jackie Woodburne) loans Hendrix hers. Hendrix, then finds Brent's confidential school records and accidentally uploads them to the school server. Brent is left devastated after the files are leaked and Harlow comforts him. Jane Harris (Annie Jones) suggests a Year 13 initiative for the boys, geared towards independent study. Brent and Hendrix continue to argue during a food tech class where Brent deliberately ruins Hendrix's soufflé and winds him up into throwing the bowl at him, which he ducks. Jane enters and slips on the mess and almost injures herself. In spite of this, the initiative continues with Curtis Perkins (Nathan Borg) overseeing it. Harlow begins tutoring Hendrix and there is an attraction between the two. Brent gives Harlow a gift and she kisses him. Harlow initially dismisses it, but Brent's feelings grow. He then gives Harlow a USB containing his personal files in order to be honest and open with her. After the site of Brent's work project at Eden University is vandalised, Harlow admits to Paul that she is seeing Brent, which angers Paul.

Brent receives a threatening text message from Holden Brice (Toby Derrick) and the same day Number 32 is ransacked, leaving Nicolette Stone (Charlotte Chimes) shaken. He then receives a skull ring in an envelope. When Brent and Emmett's aunt Linda Donaldson (Amelia Best), wants to take Emmett to New Zealand with her, he appeals to Aaron and David to help Emmett. Nicolette agrees to move out in order to help Emmett's chances as she has a criminal record. At Dinner, Brent stands his ground against Paul telling him that he and Harlow will be a couple whether he likes it or not. When Brent realises he has lost the ring under the couch at Number 22, he returns to look for it and recovers it only to be met by Holden. It is revealed that Holden is responsible for attacking Roxy Willis and vandalising the mural, as well as the break-in at Number 32. Holden leans on Brent to hide a stolen bike he is selling. After a robbery at The Hive, Brent and Holden are both arrested and receive criminal charges before they are sent into remand. Paul recruits Toadie Rebecchi (Ryan Moloney) as Brent's lawyer. Holden lies to the authorities about Brent's involvement in the gang's crimes and more charges are brought against Brent. Curtis visits Brent with Toadie and suggests that Brent should join the Australian Defence Force instead of going to prison. Brent agrees that he would rather do that and Toadie makes it possible. Before Brent says goodbye, he announces that he will be based in New South Wales. He and Harlow agree to a long distance relationship. Brent then says goodbye to Aaron, David, Jane, Terese and Paul and is escorted out by Harlow. He later agrees to Harlow's plan for Jesse Porter (Cameron Robbie) to pose as her boyfriend to avoid Paul's interference. A few months later, Brent returns to Erinsborough and greets Harlow in Harold's Café. He discovers that Paul paid Holden to give false a testimony against him. When Harlow expresses her support for Paul, Brent ends their relationship. He tells Harlow that she is a different person, and he leaves for New Zealand to live with his brother and mother.

== Nicolette Stone ==
Nicolette Stone, played by Charlotte Chimes, made her first appearance on 15 July 2020. The character and Chimes' casting were announced on 27 June 2020. Nicolette is the estranged daughter of Jane Harris (Annie Jones). Her debut coincides with the permanent reintroduction of Jane, who was once a regular character and had been appearing on a recurring basis for two years. Writers created a backstory for her, which details a fractured relationship with Jane ever since Nicolette decided to come out as lesbian. Discussing the announcement, Jones stated "audiences will learn more about her family, as fans are introduced to her daughter Nicolette for the first time." From 22 July 2021, Nicolette was removed from the series' opening titles as part of a storyline that saw her abscond from Erinsborough. The character's future was not commented on by the Neighbours production team at this time. Nicolette reappeared on 9 and 10 August, in scenes set in Canberra, before returning to Erinsborough on 20 September. She was restored to the opening titles later in the same week. Nicolette's final appearance was on 28 July 2022, the Neighbours finale.

== Rose Walker ==
Rose Walker
- Neighbours character
- Portrayed by: Lucy Durack
- Duration: 2020–2021
- First appearance: 27 August 2020
- Last appearance: 16 September 2021
- Introduced by: Jason Herbison
In-universe information
- Occupation: Personal assistant Junior beauty therapist
- Husband: James Solomon
- Sons: Noah

Rose Walker, played by Lucy Durack, made her first appearance on 27 August 2020. The character and Durack's casting details were announced on 18 June 2020. Durack began filming that same week. Durack felt fortunate to be working during the COVID-19 pandemic and said Neighbours was "so fast and such a well-oiled machine". Rose is hired as Toadfish Rebecchi's (Ryan Moloney) assistant at his law firm. In an interview posted to the show's official YouTube channel, Durack explained that Rose is a mother of two teenagers and is in the middle of a divorce from her husband James Solomon (Bert La Bonté). She comes to Toadie's temporary office looking for a job, and Moloney said there is "a little bit of a spark between the two of them". Durack also said that the characters have a fun time hanging out together, which leads to hijinks and office pranks. Rose departed at the conclusion of her storyline on 30 September 2020. Durack reprised the role on 17 August 2021, as Rose becomes involved in a love triangle with Toadie and his new partner Melanie Pearson (Lucinda Cowden). With her marriage definitely over, Rose comes to check on Toadie while she is working for the Shorts and Briefs Film Festival. Durack explained: "Rose comes back into town under the guise of being the PR manager for the film festival, but she's mostly there to see Toadie, who she's very fond of. In any other circumstance, I think Rose would like Melanie. But in this instance, she sees her as a roadblock in the way of her romantic future with Toadie."

Rose interviews for an assistant job with Toadfish Rebecchi at his temporary law office in Lassiter's Hotel. Toadie learns that they are fans of the Essendon Bombers, and when Rose helps him answer a couple of phone calls, he offers her a trial. Rose struggles to deal with the computerised legal files, but later helps Toadie keep an important client. Rose lets herself into the office in order to access Toadie's laptop, but struggles to guess the password and accidentally locks it. She is then interrupted by the arrival of Mackenzie Hargreaves (Georgie Stone), on whom she blames the password lock. She also takes credit for a drafted document that Mackenzie completed, leading her to expose Rose's lack of IT skills. Rose admits that she took time off to raise her sons and technology passed her by, which left her embarrassed. Toadie asks Mackenzie to help train her. Rose pranks Toadie with a fake spider and he soon gets her back, starting a prank war between the two. Rose gets phone call from someone checking to see if she has gotten into Toadie's computer yet and she asks them not to call again. Rose helps Mackenzie with a speech for a school election. Hendrix Greyson (Benny Turland) catches Rose taking photos of a file belonging to her husband's company and blackmails her into giving him a copy of Mackenzie's speech. Hendrix later asks Rose to come clean about using her job to find out information on her husband, but he eventually tells Toadie himself. Rose tries to defend her actions, but Toadie points out that she could have cost him his licence and fires her. Rose begs Toadie not to tell James what happened and she explains that she gave up everything to raise her children and help him start a business, so she deserves her fair share, but James is hiding money in a shell corporation to avoid giving it to her.

Rose's credit card is declined at The Waterhole and she soon learns her accounts have been frozen. She breaks down in tears in front of Toadie and Mackenzie, prompting Toadie to call the manager of Lassiter's, Terese Willis (Rebekah Elmaloglou) and get Rose a job at the day spa. Rose asks Toadie and Mackenzie to help test her beauty treatment skills as part of her induction, but the treatments go wrong and Rose is asked to take a refresher course. Rose receives her divorce settlement, which leaves her with very little money and no child support. Both Toadie and Mackenzie urge her not to sign it, and Toadie later tells her where to look and what to say in order to get a better deal. To thank him, Rose cooks him dinner and Toadie admits that he likes her. They agree to go on a proper date. The following day, Pierce Greyson (Tim Robards) asks Rose about cutting her treatment sessions short and tells her to call the spa manager to sort things out. Rose's husband James finds her and Toadie having lunch and confronts them about how they know each other. Rose says they met at a yoga class, and that Toadie was giving her general advice. James does not believe their story and tells Toadie that he is suing him for malpractice and will give Rose nothing in the settlement. Rose asks James if he hates her that much that he wants to ruin her life and Toadie's. Pierce interrupts to ask Rose if she has spoken to her manager yet, but when she says no, he fires her. Rose apologises and asks if he is okay, which makes Pierce realise he has been too harsh and changes his mind, impressing James. Rose realises that she still loves James, and she explains to Toadie that she never saw him as he was working all the time. When James failed to meet her one night, she decided to leave with the children. Toadie gets James and Rose to talk and they apologise for hurting one another. Rose tells James that she just wants her family back and James agrees. Before she leaves town, Rose thanks Toadie for his kindness and asks him to say goodbye to Mackenzie for her.

Rose returns to Erinsborough to oversee the Shorts and Briefs Film Festival. After meeting up again with Toadie, Susan (Jackie Woodburne) and Karl Kennedy (Alan Fletcher), Rose learns that Toadie is dating Melanie Pearson. When Hendrix questions whether Rose is still interested in Toadie, she admits that she and James have split up for good and that she cannot stop thinking about Toadie. Melanie approaches Rose and asks if she can help with the film festival, but Rose tells her that she does not want to hire Melanie due to her reputation. Rose later finds her car windscreen smashed in and, with Toadie, confronts Melanie, who denies deliberately damaging it and orders her to get out of the house. Later, Toadie tells Rose he is willing to give her financial help, especially considering she is going through a divorce. Rose hugs Toadie and Melanie walks in on them. Melanie complains that she had to give a statement to the police and the two begin to bicker, before Rose calls her deranged and Toadie leaves to see if Melanie is okay. At the festival launch party, Rose and Melanie dress as the same film character, causing more tension between them. Rose plays a prank on Toadie, who attempts to get her back, but Melanie gets caught in the middle and falls into a table, leading to her hospitalisation. Rose is informed that Anna Buke (Fiona Macleod) smashed her windscreen and she apologises to Melanie. Rose later asks for Toadie's help with the festival's insurance. As they finish up, Rose kisses Toadie, who briefly kisses her back before pulling away. She then admits that she is back in Erinsborough for him.

Toadie and Rose witness Melanie meeting with her former partner, Justin Buke (Mick O'Malley). Later that day, Rose meets with Justin and it emerges that she asked him to meet with Melanie in return for her dropping the complaint against Anna. Hendrix tells Rose that Toadie has planned a grand gesture to win Melanie back, which Rose doubts will happen. She is sorry that Melanie has been hurt, and she no longer likes the sneaking around and conspiring, but she believes that she and Toadie make a better couple. Melanie accuses Rose of purposely breaking up her relationship to serve her own needs, but Toadie says they had problems before Rose arrived. Rose spends Father's Day with Toadie and his children, but they miss Melanie. Toadie and Rose later arrange a proper date at the film festival. Rose notices Melanie hand Amy Greenwood (Jacinta Stapleton) a USB stick containing her entry for the film competition, which Amy leaves on the bar. Rose takes the USB, watches the footage and then destroys it. When Melanie turns up with another copy, Rose refuses to put the film in the competition. However, the film, in which Melanie declares her love for Toadie, ends up being shown and Rose realises that Toadie still loves Melanie. Rose congratulates Melanie on winning the competition, before Toadie apologises to her. She tells him that if he is happy, then she is happy and hopes they can still be friends.

== Nathan Packard ==
Nathan Packard
- Neighbours character
- Portrayed by: Jackson Gallagher
- First appearance: 4 November 2020
- Last appearance: 2 December 2020
- Introduced by: Jason Herbison
In-universe information
- Occupation: Carpenter

Nathan "Packo" Packard, played by Jackson Gallagher, made his first appearance on 4 November 2020. The character and Gallagher's casting were confirmed by TV Soap in late October. A writer for the publication said Nathan would have a connection to Levi Canning (Richie Morris), and his "sexy swagger" would also attract the attention of Bea Nilsson (Bonnie Anderson). Gallagher later explained that Nathan "was a wayward youth" and friends with Levi's cousin Kyle Canning (Chris Milligan) when they were both teenagers. He visits Erinsborough in an effort to help Levi with a trauma from his past. However, he also becomes involved with Bea, who is Levi's love interest. Gallagher commented "Sparks fly. And there ensues the love triangle, because Bea and Levi are on again, off again." Gallagher and Anderson's romantic scenes involved no physical touching due to COVID-19 filming restrictions. Gallagher admitted that it was "tricky" to create intimacy between their characters, but they relied on "long intense gazing". Anderson also had to go into a two-week self isolation after competing on The Masked Singer, which had a COVID outbreak among the crew, so some of her scenes with Gallagher were filmed through FaceTime.

Nathan is contacted by Kyle Canning, who wants to help his cousin Levi Canning gain closure over a bashing he suffered when he was younger. Nathan comes to Erinsborough with an apology letter taking responsibility for the attack and drops it off at the Erinsborough Police Station for Levi. He later meets Bea Nilsson after walking into her and they go on a date. Kyle later sees Bea and Nathan together, and urges Nathan to break up with Bea because she and Levi have a connection. Nathan then sends her a break up text. Kyle and Levi's grandmother Sheila Canning (Colette Mann) arranges to meet Nathan to make sure his apology is genuine, but they are seen by Bea and Levi. Bea then learns that Nathan attacked Levi and asks him why he did not say anything, but he explains that he did not know when they met. Nathan meets Levi the following day and checks if they are okay. Levi asks him if he went after Bea to get at him, but Nathan assures Levi that it was just a coincidence. Nathan later talks with Bea via video call about what happened between them and Levi. Bea tells him that he hurt her and she cannot get past it, before ending the call. Days later, Levi meets with Nathan, who says he read his letter and thanks him for giving him a chance. Levi tells Nathan to try again with Bea, as she likes him. They take a photo together to show Bea that things between them are good. Sheila gets in Nathan's face and asks him to stay away from Levi and Bea. As he walks past her he trips over a loose cable and the attached light hits him in the head, knocking him unconscious. Nathan suffers a concussion and has to stay in Erinsborough Hospital, where he is visited by Bea and Sheila, who apologises. Nathan and Bea make up and he asks her out on a date, but he soon realises that she has feelings for Levi. Nathan decides to go home alone and leaves Bea a goodbye note, encouraging her to be with Levi.

== Jay Rebecchi ==
Jay Rebecchi
- Neighbours character
- Portrayed by: Dhruv Malge
- Duration: 2020–2021
- First appearance: 13 November 2020
- Last appearance: 30 March 2021
- Introduced by: Jason Herbison
In-universe information
- Occupation: Student
- Father: Shane Rebecchi
- Mother: Dipi Rebecchi
- Sisters: Yashvi Rebecchi; Kirsha Rebecchi
- Uncles: Toadie Rebecchi
- First cousins: Nell Rebecchi; Hugo Somers

Jay Rebecchi, played by Dhruv Malge, made his first appearance on 13 November 2020. Daniel Kilkelly of Digital Spy confirmed the character's introduction on 18 October 2020, following the appearance of his name in a leaked script. Further details about the character and Malge's casting were released on 2 November. Recalling the casting process, Malge said "An audition came in from my agent saying it's for Neighbours, so I jumped at the opportunity and sent in a self-tape. The day I got called and my agent told me I got offered the role, I actually started jumping." Jay is the middle child of Dipi Rebecchi (Sharon Johal) and Shane Rebecchi (Nicholas Coghlan). He has often been referred to by his on-screen family since their arrival in 2017. He is said to have been studying at a Sydney boarding school.

Malge admitted that it was "a huge thing" playing a character whose appearance had been anticipated by the viewers for a long time. He said he had a "responsibility to do right by Jay and make the most of this opportunity." Malge described Jay as "a smart, confident teenager. He's Shane and Dipi's golden child, so he's obviously seen as this perfect image of a son, with a caring soul always wanting to fix everything." Malge also said Jay is "academically gifted" and won a scholarship to his school, which his parents supported as it was the best option for him. Jay's arrival coincides with the discovery that Dipi has been having an affair, leaving her marriage in trouble. Malge thought that Jay's response was typical of a child whose family was having "a rough time", but his presence and confidence has a positive impact on his family. The character departed during the episode broadcast on 20 January 2021, as Malge's guest stint ended. Jay returns to Sydney, accompanied by Dipi. A conversation Jay has with Mackenzie Hargreaves (Georgie Stone) beforehand set up a possible return for him in the future, as he mentions that he will be back one day. Malge made a cameo appearance on 30 March 2021, as his on-screen parents departed the show.

After spending years at a boarding school in Sydney, Jay decides to visit his parents, Dipi and Shane Rebecchi, in Erinsborough, but he finds them arguing upon his arrival. After greeting his sister Yashvi Rebecchi (Olivia Junkeer), Jay asks to be caught up with everything that has been going on. The family go to Harold's Café, where Shane explains that Dipi's affair with Pierce Greyson (Don Hany) has been a struggle. Jay assures his father that he can get through it without turning to drugs, while Dipi apologises for being part of the reason he has come down. Jay says he is not disappointed to see his parents. Jay later tells Yashvi that he is not on anyone's side and feels bad for everyone involved. Jay meets Pierce's son Hendrix Greyson (Benny Turland) and realises that Hendrix is not a fan of his father. Along with his uncle Toadfish Rebecchi (Ryan Moloney), Jay pulls Shane away from Pierce before a fight breaks out. After Pierce is hospitalised due to arrhythmia, it emerges that Jay gave Hendrix an ADHD pill to drug his father. They both regret their actions, but Jay assures Hendrix that Pierce is okay. Hendrix later owns up to what he did and texts Jay to let him know that he kept his name out of it. Jay later asks Dipi to apologise to Shane for accusing him of hurting Pierce and they both agree to talk. Jay asks Mackenzie Hargreaves and Richie Amblin (Lachlan Millar) if he can go to schoolies with them. Mackenzie says that she and Jay can spend some proper time together and talk about their school in Bourke. Mackenzie asks Jay if he remembers the school bully, Tommo Wilson, but Jay says he does not remember him. Shane tells Jay that he will check with Dipi if he can go, but he cannot drink alcohol while he is there. Jay later meets Hendrix's girlfriend, Harlow Robinson (Jemma Donovan), who points out that they will need another car if Jay is coming along. Jay suggests that Hendrix uses his father's car, but Harlow shuts down the idea as Hendrix cannot drive yet. After Mackenzie and Harlow pull out of the trip, Hendrix decides to drive Jay, Richie and Ollie Sudekis (Ellmir Asipi) to the site himself. Jay grabs a box of wine from Hendrix's house before they leave and he later learns that it was meant to be a gift for the Kennedys. Jay thanks Hendrix for allowing him to come and Hendrix replies that he is glad Jay is there to laugh at Ollie's jokes.

Both Hendrix and Jay learn that Ollie is using an app called The Ladder to rank Erinsborough High girls on how good they are in bed. Hendrix calls out Ollie's treatment towards the girls, while Richie diffuses the situation by suggesting they play beer pong. They soon hear a commotion from the car park and find Shane and Pierce fighting. Jay throws up due to all of the alcohol he has consumed and schoolies is cancelled. Jay apologises to his father for drinking and says that he had no idea about the app until that day. Jay also apologises to Dipi and admits he was just trying to impress the older boys. He also tells his parents that he wants to transfer to Erinsborough for his final year of school. Ollie asks Jay if he and some friends can hang out at the café after hours, which Jay agrees to. The café gets trashed and Jay begs Hendrix to help him clean up. Hendrix suggests they stage a break-in and Jay asks him to delete the CCTV footage, which he does. However, Hendrix soon becomes a suspect in the break-in and he briefly ends his friendship with Jay. When Mackenzie receives a friend request from an old classmate who rescued her from a store room Jay locked her in, he claims not to remember the incident. After Hendrix loses his job, Jay tells him that he knows how to count cards and offers to teach Hendrix how to play blackjack, so they can enter into an illegal game at the hotel. The pair pretend not to know each other and Hendrix wins. They decide to enter another game, but Jay is late after staying home to comfort an upset Mackenzie. Hendrix loses all of his money and gets into debt with the host Kane Jones (Barry Conrad). At the next game, Kane is suspicious that someone is card counting and brings out an extra deck of cards. Jay tries to get Hendrix to pull out, but he refuses and ends up owing Kane more money. Jay's younger sister Kirsha Rebecchi (Vani Dhir) joins the family for Christmas. While looking at some photos Kirsha has hung up, Mackenzie asks Jay why he does not want to talk about primary school and he admits that he was bullied for being overweight. Mackenzie lets him know that she is available if he ever wants to talk and they later share a romantic moment while playing pool.

Kane sends Hendrix a bullet as a warning, so Jay helps Hendrix steal a diamond necklace that Pierce gave to Dipi to pay his debt. However, Kane only wipes half of Hendrix's debt, as he wants him to continue playing. Hendrix soon loses his house to Kane, despite Jay advising him to stop playing. Nicolette Stone (Charlotte Chimes) discovers what they have been up to when she is invited to a game and she gives them 24 hours to come clean. Hendrix later steals a gun from another player and Jay tells him to get rid of it. Hendrix hides it in the Kennedy's pizza oven, which later explodes when it is turned on and Shane is shot in the leg. The incident leads Hendrix to confess everything, while Jay also tells his family how he initially suggested counting cards. He later tells Mackenzie that he just wanted to fit in with Hendrix and Ollie, but things with Hendrix got out of control. Shane's girlfriend Amy Greenwood (Jacinta Stapleton) advises him to take responsibility for his actions, which he does. But when Jay says that he is going to change things when he gets back to Sydney, his parents tell him that he will not be returning. He later explains to them about his attempts to fit in with the popular students and tells them that he needs to finish his final year being who he really is. They agree that he can return to his school as a day student, as he will be living with his grandparents. Jay tells Mackenzie that he will miss her and admits that she likes him. After learning that he is leaving for Sydney that day, Jay tells Mackenzie that he likes her too, but if they started something then he would not be able to concentrate on school or sorting himself out. The Rebecchis throw a farewell lunch for Jay and he tells Mackenzie that he will be back someday. Weeks later, Mackenzie and Jay have a video call and they discuss Shane and Dipi's departure from Erinsborough. Mackenzie makes a comment about visiting him, but Jay quickly changes the subject. Hendrix later speaks with Jay and tells Mackenzie that he is dating someone.

== Others ==
Date(s)	Character	Actor	Circumstances
8 January	Anita Kent	Victoria Chiu	A consultant sent by Lucy Robinson to assess the performance of the new general manager of Lassiter's Hotel, Chloe Brennan. Anita is impressed when Chloe hits Lucy's revenue target and gives a successful presentation of a long-term strategy plan. She says she will tell Lucy to reconsider her decision to fire Chloe. However, Anita soon learns that Chloe worked with the former manager Terese Willis on the presentation.
14 January	Seth Fleming	Zane Ciarma	A young boy who attends a Buddy Club event hosted by Kyle Canning. He initially messes around and ignores Kyle, causing Terese Willis to intervene and tell him not to ruin the day for the others. Seth glues his hands to some wood and Kyle frees him with acetone, before they bond over their absent fathers.
6–7 February	Caden Hutchins	Kai Baker	A child who attends the Buddy Club program hosted by Kyle Canning at Lassiter's Lake. David Tanaka finds a gun in Caden's backpack and he and Kyle realise it is real when it goes off. No one is hurt, and the police talk with Caden. As he waits for his father to pick him up, Caden tells Kyle that he did not think the gun was real and he is scared of his sister, as he found the gun in her car. Kyle later sees Ned Willis talking with Caden about his sister, Greta Hutchins.
13 February–11 March	Trent Kelly	Peter Houghton	Finn Kelly's estranged father. His girlfriend Bea Nilsson and her sister Elly Conway meet with Trent to get to know him. Trent admits that he tried to save Finn from kidnappers in Columbia, but he got drunk at the airport and a woman stole the money, which led him to give up and return home. Finn decides to meet Trent, and they both apologise for not getting in contact. Trent says he was in a bad place when Finn left home, and was at rock bottom when Finn's half-brother, Shaun Watkins called to say he had woken from his coma. Trent gives Finn his six-month sobriety chip and says he is the reason that he got sober. They have coffee together and Trent promises to come back soon. Elly catches Trent before he leaves and asks him not to tell Finn about leaving him in Colombia, as she does not want anything to set Finn back. Trent tries to contact Finn, who eventually agrees to meet him. Finn asks Trent to tell him the whole story about Colombia, and he learns that Trent actually gambled the ransom money away. He then attacks his father and warns him not to contact him again. Trent urges Finn to get help, as he walks away.
17 February–7 September	Dax Braddock	Dean Kirkright	A police detective who leads a task force to a warehouse, where Zenin Alexio is hoarding illegal guns. As Dax announces himself, Zenin grabs Ned Willis and threatens to shoot him. Yashvi Rebecchi distracts Zenin and Dax pushes him up against a wall and arrests him. He thanks Yashvi for her help, and later brings Mark Brennan to Ramsay Street to talk with Ned. Dax is part of a team that raids Mackenzie Hargreaves's apartment looking for Mannix Foster. He questions Mackenzie and her friend Harlow Robinson about Mannix and how he came to live there. At the station, Dax tells Mackenzie that they have not managed to contact her aunt, but Mr and Mrs Rebecchi are on the way. Dax is later called to Ramsay Street to pick up Mannix and he realises that Paul could be involved as he has had dealings with Mannix before. When Harlow is arrested for possession of drugs, Terese Willis asks Dax is there is a way they can avoid Harlow being charged, as it would mean a lot to her family. Harlow is released without charge, but Terese fears that she has inadvertently bribed Dax when his wife Keryn Braddock fails to pay for her treatments at the Lassiter's Day Spa. Dax reassures her that his wife simply misunderstood and promises to have a word. Constables Yashvi and Levi Canning investigate drug dealing at the high school, and Dax praises Yashvi for finding a roll of tape in Ollie Sudekis's bag that was used to hide some drugs in a bin. He later demands to know why they want to speak to River Hanlon, and Yashvi explains that he has been selling amphetamines to her father. Dax asks them to tell him everything in future and later drops the case. He soon realises Yashvi and Levi are suspicious of him, and he attacks and tasers River, forcing him to blame Yashvi, who is suspended. Dax visits Levi and his grandmother Sheila Canning, ensuring that he has an alibi. He also learns Levi has epilepsy and blackmails him, before swapping out Levi's epilepsy medication. Yashvi learns that Lacey Lane is the school dealer, and that Dax is her supplier, as he was helping out a former officer Jamie Briggs. Dax turns up at the school, having been contacted by Lacey. He threatens Yashvi with a taser and locks her, Mackenzie, Richie Amblin and Susan Kennedy in a classroom. He hits Richie with his baton and then chases after Harlow and Paul Robinson, locking them in the toilets. The police arrive outside and Dax leaves the classroom to sabotage a power box, causing the lights to go off. As the others flee, Dax tasers Mackenzie. He attempts to hit Yashvi with his baton, but she disarms him and he is arrested.
16 March	Anderson Kent	Christian O'Connell	A man who discusses his venue and ice sculpture with Susan Kennedy at the Lassiter's wedding expo. When she asks if he would like to hear about her celebrant services, Anderson explains that he does not have a partner, but that a pre-paid wedding could entice someone to date him. He then asks if Susan is single and she playfully hits his shoulder, flattered by the comment.
2–3 April	Trish Symington	Katherine Tonkin	Mackenzie Hargreaves' aunt, who is moving to Fremantle for work and wants Mackenzie to come with her unless the Rebecchis agree to take her in. Mackenzie later asks Trish if she could live with Paul Robinson and Terese Willis instead. Trish is sceptical, but asks to meet with them, however, Paul and Terese are out when she and Mackenzie come over. Roxy Willis talks them up and reassures Trish that Mackenzie would be welcome at Number 22. Trish is not sure about letting Mackenzie stay if she cannot meet Paul and Terese, but eventually agrees when Mackenzie assures her that she will move her stuff out of the flat with the help of her friends.
7 April	Candy Wong	Lorraine Patterson	A woman who attends a grief support group at the Erinsborough Community Centre and explains how she is lonely since her loved one died.
10 April	Paddy Kaye	Matthew Hamilton	A man who runs the grief support group. He calls on Susan Kennedy to talk about her experience.
10 April 2020–5 May 2022	Gary	Uncredited	A pigeon that Sheila Canning believes is the reincarnation of her son, Gary Canning. Sheila develops an emotional connection to the bird, which worries her family and friends. When Gary goes missing, Sheila finds him unresponsive in Susan and Karl Kennedy's backyard and assumes he has died, however, Gary is just intoxicated having consumed a large quantity of rotten fruit. Gary soon wakes up and flies off. He continues to show up for food and Sheila finds comfort in his presence. While marking the anniversary of Gary and his fiancée Prue Wallace's deaths at The 82, the pigeon turns up and bonds with another pigeon that Sheila believes to be a reincarnated Prue. Toadie Rebecchi and Kyle Canning investigate Number 26 after the alarm goes off and receive a scare from Gary and Prue, who were the ones that set off the alarm whilst in the backyard. A few months later, Kyle straps a mini camera around Gary to record a short film and links the camera up to his laptop. Through the laptop, Kyle, Sheila, Roxy Willis and Levi Canning watch Gary fly over Erinsborough and Ramsay Street, and Gary captures Amy Greenwood with Ned Willis. Sheila brings Gary to Kyle and Roxy's wedding ceremony the following year, and Levi feeds Gary when he becomes distressed. When Kyle and Roxy are leaving Erinsborough, they say goodbye to Gary at The 82. Mann revealed that she initially thought the storyline would be "hideous", but she grew to enjoy it and thought Gary served as a "nice coping mechanism" for Sheila.
16 April 2020–18 March 2021, 14 October 2025	Leila Potts	Jing-Xuan Chan	A social worker who comes to interview David Tanaka and Aaron Brennan for approval as foster carers. However, David has to apologise for Aaron's absence when he does not show up. David's father Paul Robinson later contacts Leila and arranges for another interview, as it was his fault Aaron was late. Leila returns to carry out a home assessment and another interview with Aaron and David. She questions Aaron about his abusive father and his past career as an exotic dancer. During their second interview, Aaron is insulted when Leila asks them if they are happy being gay, and whether a child in their care would be at a disadvantage without a mother figure. Aaron later sends an apology email to Leila explaining that he found the interview process challenging. Leila later contacts David and Aaron to see if they can take an emergency case. She introduces them to teenager Emmett Donaldson and explains that his previous placement broke down, after Emmett fought with another foster child. After leaving Aaron and David to talk it over, they agree to take Emmett in for the night and later for the week. Aaron and David contact Leila when Emmett runs away, and she tells them that he has done it before, as it is his coping mechanism. When Emmett returns, Leila asks him if he is okay to stay the week and to promise not to run away again. She continues to visit Number 32 during Emmett's stay, including following the arrivals of his brother Brent Colefax and their mother, Jenna Donaldson. Leila returns several months later to assess Number 32 as a permanent home for Emmett, who expresses his desire to live with David, Aaron and Brent. Years later, Leila is called to Erinsborough High School by Jane Harris to speak to pupil Addison Rutherford, who has been living in the school, and arranges her emergency accommodation.
20 April	Judge Joseph Vagg	Rick Burchall	The judge presides over Elly Conway's sentencing hearing. He asks her to confirm that she is pleading guilty to the voluntary manslaughter of Finn Kelly, before listening to character statements and what Finn did to her and her family. Following a short recess, the judge says he is taking two previous incidents with Finn into consideration and sentences Elly to three years imprisonment, with a non-parole period of two years. Finn's mother Claudia Watkins later thanks Judge Vagg for the sentence he delivered and reveals that she blackmailed him, with the help of her lawyer Samantha Fitzgerald, when she hands over an envelope, telling him that they are all there and his wife will never know.
21 April–18 May	Patrice Bannister	Chanella Macri	Elly Conway's cellmate. Patrice asks Elly what she is in for and reveals that she committed aggravated assault. Andrea Somers orders Patrice to leave so she can speak to Elly. During a prison riot, Patrice helps barricade the common room and snatches Elly's daughter Aster Conway, saying she can help calm her down. Andrea tells her to give Aster back, before pulling her hair and yelling at her to back up, giving Elly a chance to grab Aster. After Elly gets on Andrea's bad side, she arranges for Patrice to beat up Elly. Andrea later organises a fight between Patrice and Elly, who does not want to be involved. She tells Patrice to think of her son, but Patrice replies that he has given up on her. They circle one another and Elly pulls out a shiv, causing Patrice to goad her into using it. Patrice punches Elly in the stomach and is just about to strangle her when a guard interrupts and takes Elly to see the Governor.
21 April–15 June	Bonnie Louden	Ruvarashe Ngwenya	A corrections officer who asks Elly Conway how her daughter Aster Conway is settling in. She tells Elly that she will not be bunking with Patrice Bannister for too long. Bonnie tells Elly to stay put as a riot suddenly breaks out elsewhere in the prison. Bonnie later interrupts a fight between Elly and Patrice, before taking Elly to see the Governor. She accompanies Elly to get her belongings and warns Andrea Somers to step back when Elly reveals she is being released. She later brings Andrea to see Dee Bliss in the visiting area, but has to stop the visit and order Andrea back to her cell when she starts shouting at Dee. Bonnie is not interested when Heather Schilling reports that she cannot find Andrea. Heather tries to convince Bonnie that Andrea has swapped places with Dee, who is in the infirmary, and only when she mentions the police getting involved does Bonnie take her claims seriously. When Toadfish Rebecchi confirms Dee's identity, Bonnie goes to talk to the Governor. She later tells Heather that Andrea has taken her son, Hugo Somers.
23 April–4 May	Jessica Quince	Lynn Gilmartin	A young woman who attends a grief support group and befriends Kyle Canning and his grandmother Sheila Canning. Jessica and Kyle go back to his house for drinks and he opens up to her about his father. When Jessica asks Kyle if he has someone there for him, they kiss and have sex. Jessica and Kyle later meet for coffee and they discuss Sheila's obsession with a pigeon. Jessica offers to speak with Sheila after group. Roxy Willis approaches Jessica and tells her that some advice she gave Kyle to give to Sheila was wrong. Jessica asks Roxy who she is, before Roxy's friends pull her away. Jessica and Kyle attend the launch of the Lassiter's Hotel rooftop pool together. Days later, Kyle breaks up with Jessica.
28 April	Pauline Grace	Lydia Rollands	A family court judge who presides over a custody hearing for Aster Conway. She listens to cases from lawyers Toadfish Rebecchi and Samantha Fitzgerald on behalf of their clients Karl and Susan Kennedy and Claudia Watkins. As Susan addresses Claudia and loses her temper, Pauline realises that they are not going to come to a mutual agreement and awards Claudia interim custody of Aster.
28 April	Zach Zucker	John Walpole	A Lassiter's Hotel guest who comes to check in. He tells Ned Willis that he will be in the lounge and asks him to take care of his bags.
30 April–12 June	Elise Heany	Kai Bradley	An inmate at Goodwood Women's Prison. Andrea Somers shows Elise and some other inmates a photo of her son Hugo Somers and brags that he will be visiting her soon, with her sister's help. Elise does not believe her, knowing that Hugo's father is a lawyer and has a bad history with Andrea. Elise moves away when Andrea gets in her face and tells her that she will see her son again. Elise later makes a bet with Andrea over the outcome of a fight between Elly Conway and Patrice Bannister. Guard Owen Campbell slips a shiv into Elise's pocket and then calls for a contraband check. Elise pulls it out and denies it belongs to her, but the prison is sent into lockdown.
13 May	Jeremy Briggs	Scott Mackenzie	A police officer who approaches Claudia Watkins and tells her that he is available again if she needs anything doing regularly, as he can do more than make evidence disappear. Claudia tells him that she does not need his services and to leave her alone. Chloe Brennan and Aaron Brennan overhear the conversation and later learn who Jeremy is. Aaron confronts Claudia and she confirms that Jeremy set the fire that destroyed the evidence in Finn Kelly's case.
15 May	Meg Lee	Esther Van Doornum	Judge Vagg's former clerk, who Toadfish Rebecchi meets with to discuss his suspicions that Judge Vagg is being bribed. He tells her that he will prove it and suspects that she found out and quit. Meg tells him that she was fired after 20 years because she found out Judge Vagg was being blackmailed over his gambling debts and she had the proof. Meg had to keep quiet to secure another job. She agrees to help Toadie, so he can secure Elly Conway's release from jail.
10 June	Jamie Spiteri	Megan Mitchell	A landscape gardener who is set up on a date with Kyle Canning by his grandmother Sheila Canning. Jamie tells Kyle that she owns her own business and has a young son. Kyle realises that she is similar to his former girlfriend Amy Williams and tells Sheila that he is not interested in dating Jamie.
23 June	Kasper Perry	Euan Doidge	A journalist that continuously contacts Elly Conway and Bea Nilsson about Finn Kelly. He later approaches Elly and tells her that he has some questions, and that his boss has been pressuring him to get some soundbites. Elly refuses to talk and when Kasper tries to look in her daughter's pram, Shaun Watkins tells him to back off and stop contacting Elly. Kasper apologises before leaving.
1 July	Celia Paschall	Hannah Greenwood	Two women who hold a mother's group at the park that Elly Conway joins. They exchange stories, before Celia tells Elly that they have read the book about Finn Kelly and his crimes. Elly says that the book does not tell the truth and she opens up about her life and what really happened. Fiona calls her strong for going through everything and they continue to swap advice. Celia later texts Elly to say that the other mothers do not want a murderer in the group.
1 July	Fiona Cook	Bella Merrington	Two women who hold a mother's group at the park that Elly Conway joins. They exchange stories, before Celia tells Elly that they have read the book about Finn Kelly and his crimes. Elly says that the book does not tell the truth and she opens up about her life and what really happened. Fiona calls her strong for going through everything and they continue to swap advice. Celia later texts Elly to say that the other mothers do not want a murderer in the group.
1 July	Zoya Spellman	Tobie Webster	An Erinsborough High student, who asks Emmett Donaldson why he did not mention Louis Curtain was involved in vandalising the school classroom. Emmett says that he is not a snitch and Zoya calls him a tough guy for taking all the blame. He says that he will tell Louis that Emmett has got his back.
3–6 July	Keryn Braddock	Sarah MacLeod	Dax Braddock's wife. Terese Willis learns that Keryn left the Lassiter's Day Spa without paying, as she thought the treatments were complimentary. Keryn later thanks Terese when she sees her in The Waterhole, leaving Terese wondering if she accidentally bribed a police sergeant. Keryn later comes to see Terese to thank her again for the treatments and to ask for mate's rates on hiring the ballroom for Dax's birthday celebrations. Terese speaks with Dax and he tells her that Keryn has misunderstood their conversation and promises to sort it out.
10 July	Tucker Brunnings	James Bolton	A man who hassles Bea Nilsson about her involvement with Finn Kelly, as she is setting up her sound equipment outside The Waterhole. Bea tells him to leave her alone, but Tucker continues to provoke her and when he mentions kissing her sister, Bea punches him.
17 July–2 September	River Hanlon	Andrew Coshan	Shane Rebecchi's university classmate, who he has been working on an assignment with. They are forced to work late at the library, after realising that they have got a major component of the assignment wrong. River agrees with Shane when he wonders how they got their numbers so wrong, and adds that at least they realised their mistake before they handed it in. River says they should start from the beginning to find out where they went wrong. River reckons they can finish their work in eight hours, and Shane thanks him for his help. River later meets up with Shane to sell him some amphetamines. Shane's daughter Constable Yashvi Rebecchi and Levi Canning try to find River, after Shane names him as his dealer. River manages to escape and hides, before calling someone to tell them Yashvi has found him. Yashvi is later contacted by River, who asks her to meet him at the building and Yashvi finds he has been attacked. The paramedics find that he has been tasered and River names Yashvi as his attacker.
30 July–17 August 2020, 22–28 April 2021	Jenna Donaldson	Anna Lise Phillips	Emmett Donaldson and Brent Colefax's mother, who comes to see Emmett after being contacted by Brent. She meets his foster parents David Tanaka and Aaron Brennan and is initially hostile towards them, as she blames them for Emmett's neck injury. As Brent returns to his care home, Jenna asks if he wants to live with her when he turns 18, and he says he will think about it. Jenna reassures Emmett that she is sober and no longer with her partner. David's father Paul Robinson pays Jenna to leave, but she uses the money to buy alcohol and later shows up drunk. Paul's wife Terese Willis befriends Jenna and invites her to an AA meeting, before offering her a job as a cleaner at Lassiter's Hotel. Emmett finds bottles of alcohol in Jenna's bag, but she assures him that she is not drinking again, she was just moving them from one room to another. One of the other cleaners tells Paul about the bottles and Jenna is fired from the hotel. She tries to see Emmett, and tells him that David and Aaron are turning him against her. Jenna apologises to Paul and Terese and begs for another chance. Terese later tells her that while she supports her recovery personally, Jenna cannot have her job back. Emmett also asks her to stop lying and David points out that she needs to stop making promise she cannot keep. Jenna says goodbye to Emmett and tells him she will see him soon. Months later, Paul contacts Jenna and invites her to Erinsborough after Emmett admits to being lonely without his family. Jenna tells Aaron and David that she is sober and has a job and a flat. She also knows that Brent has been staying with them and is currently missing. Jenna later raises the issue of her and Emmett relocating to New Zealand to live near her sister, Linda Donaldson. Jenna thanks Aaron and David for taking care of her sons, but reckons it is time she stepped up. Jenna's job transfer is approved and the foster agency also approves of the move, so Emmett agrees to go. Jenna thanks Paul for making everything happen and double-checks that he will uphold his part of their deal. Jenna and Emmett depart the following morning, after saying goodbye to Aaron and David.
3–18 August	Alex Beal	Emma Annand	A women who Levi Canning flirts with at The Waterhole. He realises that she is not into his police stories and leaves her table. Alex checks out Nicolette Stone, who goes over to talk to her. They later go back to Nicolette's hotel room. Days later, Nicolette asks Alex to join her for a drink, and Alex wants to know why she has ghosted her. Nicolette apologises and says that she got invested in work, but her boss Chloe Brennan told her to have a life. Nicolette continues to talk about Chloe and Alex realises that she has feelings for her. Nicolette attempts to change the subject to get to know Alex more, but Alex says Nicolette would rather be at home with Chloe and Nicolette leaves. Hendrix Greyson approaches Alex after overhearing her mention Chloe's name, and explains that he is the son of Nicolette's employers. He tells Alex there have been a few issues at home, so he hopes that she can spend more time with Nicolette, but Alex warns him that Nicolette has a crush on Chloe.
13 August	Kayla Gold	Salme Geransar	A woman who meets Toadfish Rebecchi for a date. They struggle to find things in common, especially when Kayla mentions that she does not eat pizza, one of Toadie's favourite foods. When Toadie goes out to take a phonecall, Karl Kennedy comes over and asks Kayla about herself, before sitting down to talk more. As Toadie returns, Kayla decides to leave.
27 August	Ted Tatum	Paul McCarthy	A client of Toadfish Rebecchi's who comes to his office demanding to see him, before announcing that he is done with Rebecchi Law. Toadie's assistant Rose Walker tells him that would be a mistake, considering he has been a client for ten years. She explains that Toadie knows his business inside out, and it would cost him a lot of money to join a new firm. She convinces Ted to push back their meeting by a couple of hours.
3 September	Omari Kerr	Jason Mavroudis	An Erinsborough High student who calls Harlow Robinson a hypocrite, after seeing an article about her eating chocolates she campaigned to have removed from Lassiter's Hotel, while running a vegan sausage sizzle at the school.
17 September 2020, 19 September 2023–	Tom Nguyen	Enzo Nazario	A bartender at The Waterhole, who tells Rose Walker that her credit card has been declined. She asks him to try it again, but when it is declined for a second time, Toadfish Rebecchi tells Tom to put her order on his tab. Later, Sheila Canning is irritated by Tom talking about his bike when she places a drinks order. Years later, Tom asks JJ Varga-Murphy for ID to be at The Waterhole. He later serves Leo Tanaka and Reece Sinclair for an impromptu wine tasting. Mackenzie Hargreaves later requests Tom for the venue's strongest drink. Tom subsequently appears uncredited in the background of various Waterhole scenes.
24 September	Tony Russell	Dara Hession	A man who wants to use The Hive for storage. Owner Ned Willis asks Tony what he will be storing, but gets a vague answer, so he reminds Tony that he has a key and can let himself in.
24 September–13 October	Basil Gardener	Tyler Coppin	Scarlett Brady's American fiancé. Roxy Willis visits Basil at his home and introduces herself as a friend of Scarlett's called Gemma. Basil is happy for Roxy to wait for Scarlett to come home and he tells her about their upcoming wedding in Mauritius. Basil explains that he had to pull a few strings to sort out her visa due to her conviction, and mentions that Scarlett had a stalker who wanted her dead. He also tells Roxy that Scarlett is organising a big surprise for him as a wedding gift. Roxy thanks him for his time and promises she will visit again.
29–30 September	James Soloman	Bert La Bonté	Rose Walker's estranged husband, who finds her and his lawyer Toadfish Rebecchi having lunch together. He confronts them about how they know each other and Rose tells him that they met at a yoga class and that Toadie is giving her some advice. Knowing they are lying, James tells Toadie that he will be suing him for malpractice and refuses to give Rose anything in the settlement. James is impressed when Rose resolves a work issue with Pierce Greyson and they realise that they still love each other. Toadie gets James and Rose to talk and they each apologise for hurting one another. Rose tells James that she wants her family back and James agrees to try again.
2 October	Andrew Shannon	Barnie Duncan	An art critic who attends the opening of Ned Willis' portrait exhibition.
7 October–8 December 2020, 9 August 2021	Audrey Hamilton	Zahra Newman	A nurse and friend of Nicolette Stone, who comes to Erinsborough to tell Nicolette that she feels so guilty about taking a winning lottery ticket from a deceased patient, that she wants them to give the money to the patient's family. Nicolette refuses, having spent her half and believing that the patient's uncaring family does not deserve it. Pierce Greyson notices their exchange and thinks Nicolette is bullying Audrey. He offers her his help should she need it. Nicolette agrees to pay the money back and gets Audrey some shifts at Erinsborough Hospital. Audrey arranges for herself and Nicolette to volunteer at the Sonya Rebecchi Foundation, but Nicolette is reluctant to go along. Audrey bonds with Toadfish Rebecchi and soon learns that he is in need of a manager to help with fundraising programmes, so she offers to help part-time with admin. Audrey later donates $50,000 to the foundation, angering Nicolette, who thinks their secret will be discovered. Audrey is offered a permanent nursing position at the hospital and she suggests to Toadie that they arrange some events for Movember after Karl Kennedy grows a moustache. She attends a dinner with Karl and Toadie, who both fall ill, leaving her to take care of them. Karl later works out that Audrey made the anonymous donation from her email address. She tells him the money came from a nurses lottery syndicate and asks him to keep it from Toadie. Nicolette learns about Audrey's lie and confronts her, asking her to go home. Audrey and Toadie go on a date and admit that they like one another. Karl later tells Toadie that Audrey donated the $50,000. Audrey attends the Kennedy's Christmas party, where she tries hard to impress them. Nicolette later apologises for attempting to split Audrey and Toadie up, by telling the Kennedys that she gets obsessive with boyfriends. When Toadie talks about Audrey's selflessness, she tells him that she and Nicolette stole the money. Audrey is fired from the hospital and Toadie breaks up with her, so she returns to Canberra. Months later, Audrey is approached by Paul Robinson, who is looking for Nicolette, as she has run away while carrying his son, David Tanaka's baby. Audrey initially denies seeing Nicolette, but Paul shows her a security camera image of her and Nicolette together. Audrey tells him that they ran into each other and Nicolette said she had been betrayed and had to leave home. Audrey then shows Paul a possible place that Nicolette may be. Paul thanks her and Audrey says that Nicolette is a good person. Paul replies that she has run away with his granddaughter and he will not stop hunting until she is found.
14 October	Juliana Ayres	Chelsea Gibb	Ned Willis's lawyer. She meets with Paul Robinson and Terese Willis, who admit they were unaware that Ned was going to confess to Scarlett Brady's murder. Juliana is hopeful that she can undo the damage he has caused his case, as the police have yet to charge him. She tells Paul and Terese that she plans to order a psychiatric evaluation, which will determine that Ned was in no state to confess, but she needs his cooperation.
21 October	Sid Ketis	Trevor Major	The driver of a car involved in an accident that killed Scarlett Brady's family. Constable Levi Canning interviews Sid about the accident, and he recalls that he was speeding, but Scarlett's father was drifting into his lane and seemed unable to turn the steering wheel. Levi thanks Sid for coming in, and unbeknownst to them both, Scarlett sees Sid and follows him to the Erinsborough Community Centre. Just as she is about to get close to him, some passers-by get in the way and Sid drives away.
23 October	Alexia Trotter	Francine McAsey	A celebrant overseeing Ned Willis and Yashvi Rebecchi's wedding. She welcomes everyone after they are interrupted by Yashvi's parents and invites the couple to recite their vows. The ceremony is then interrupted by Scarlett Brady, who attempts to throw acid on the couple, but splashes herself instead.
11–18 November	Corinne Booth	Maddy Leane	An Erinsborough High student, who overhears Mackenzie Hargreaves and Richie Amblin talking about their relationship. She then hears Richie confirming to Ollie Sudekis that nothing is happening between him and Mack during schoolies. Corinne approaches Richie at Harold's Cafe and tells him he should call her. A few days later, Corinne tries to get Richie to abandon his plans with Mackenzie and join her instead, but he turns her down. Corinne tries again and tells Richie that there are rumours Mackenzie will not have sex with him because she is transgender. Richie tells her to let it go and leave. As she goes, Corinne tells Mackenzie that if she does not have sex with Richie, then Corinne is willing to.
8 December	Monty Shortt	Corey J Triffett	A Lassiter's Hotel staff member, who talks to Amy Greenwood about the uniform before being asked to shake his bottom to show how tight his trousers are.
15–23 December	Ricardo Romano	Andrew Bongiorno	The son of Nicolette Stone's former patient, Marco, from whom she and Audrey Hamilton stole a winning lottery ticket. After telling Ricardo the truth, Nicolette meets with him to discuss a payment plan she has drafted up, but Ricardo points out that it will take a long time for her to pay back the money. He then suggests that in order to hurry things along, Nicolette could have sex with him whenever he calls. Ricardo returns to town and Nicolette tells him that she wants to stick to her payment plan. She explains that she will not have sex with him, as she is a lesbian and pregnant. Ricardo then serves Nicolette with a civil suit. When she counters with a sexual harassment suit, Ricardo sends Nicolette numerous abusive text messages.
17–23 December	Noni Beal	Christina Tan	A PR consultant hired by Terese Willis to meet with Amy Greenwood, who is designing the new Lassiter's Hotel uniforms. Amy feigns illness and asks if they can talk later. Noni later returns to photograph the uniforms for the promotional campaign.
21 December 2020–14 January 2021	Natasha Leighton	Samantha Healy	A gambler who attends a blackjack game hosted by Kane Jones. She tells Jay Rebecchi not to talk Hendrix Greyson out of a bet, as watching him play has been her entertainment for the night. She comiserates with Hendrix after he loses. Natasha later attends another game and meets Nicolette Stone, whom she gives some tips to. Weeks later, Nicolette meets with Natasha to ask about how well she knows Kane, as Hendrix's girlfriend Harlow Robinson has been kidnapped. Natasha admits that she does not know him well and that Harlow sounded like a great kid from Hendrix's description. Natasha then heads to a boat ramp, where she has Harlow tied up. She tells Harlow that she will let her go as soon as her grandfather pays the ransom. Natasha goes to The Waterhole to collect a food order, but it is cancelled at the last minute and she returns to the boat ramp with a baseball bat, which she uses to intimidate and threaten Harlow. She then tries to tie Harlow to a chair, but Harlow kicks her in the cast knocking her down. Natasha wrestles Harlow on the ground and gets her in a headlock, just as Nicolette bursts in and tackles Natasha. She urges Harlow to run and picks up the bat to threaten Natasha, as the police arrive.
