= Ben Hall (Australian actor) =

Australian actor

- Born: Perth, Australia
- Occupation: Actor
- Years active: 2014–present

Ben Hall is an Australian actor. He is known for his roles in Australian television series which began with his role as Finton Kelly in the Showcase drama Devil's Playground. From 2016 until 2022, Hall played the role of Ned Willis in the soap opera Neighbours. In 2023, Hall filmed the role of Mark Waugh in the Nine Network television series, Warnie.

== Early life ==
Ben Hall was born in Perth, Western Australia. Hall's father is British. When he was a child, Hall attended a male only Catholic school. He is a graduate of the Western Australian Academy of Performing Arts (WAAPA). Hall appeared in different stage musicals following his graduation and is a trained singer.

== Career ==
Hall began his television career in 2014, playing Finton Kelly in the Showcase drama Devil's Playground. Hall described researching the role as "harrowing" but it was "incredible" to be a part of a big production. That year, Hall appeared as Hal Cooper in two episodes of ABC1 television drama, ANZAC Girls. He was also part of the ensemble for a touring production of Les Misérables. Hall took part in the Rottnest Channel Swim in 2015. In 2017, he played the gay lead character, Tim in the Australian stage musical Only Heaven Knows. He then secured guest roles in Nine Network's drama series Love Child, the Network 10 mini-series Brock and a role in a comedy series titled HActresses.

In 2016, Hall joined the cast of Australian soap opera Neighbours, playing the recurring role of Ned Willis. He filmed a second guest appearance in 2016. After Hall made his third return, the show's producer Jason Herbison revealed that Hall originally did not want to make a long-term commitment to the show. Hall reconsidered and wanted to return on a regular basis. Hall joined the show's regular cast in 2018. In 2022, prior to the show's cancellation, Hall decided to leave the role. Hall returned once again to film scenes for the show's would be final episodes. Hall later revealed that he would not be returning after the show was renewed by Amazon Freevee, but was not opposed to doing so. Hall stated that while appearing on Neighbours, he rarely showcased his comedy skills he had learned from studying at WAAPA.

Meanwhile, in 2017, Hall played the leading role of Tim in the production of the musical Only Heaven Knows at the Hayes Theatre, Sydney.

In 2023, Hall played the role of Sam Philips in the touring theatrical musical, Elvis A Musical Revolution, which is based on the American singer Elvis Presley. In June 2023, it was announced that Hall would appear as Mark Waugh in the Nine Network television series, Warnie. He has also filmed an upcoming role in the Robbie Williams biopic titled Better Man.

In April 2024, it was announced that Hall would play the leading role of Mick Dennis in Matthew Holmes' film adaption The Guns of Muschu, based on the novel by Don Dennis. The following year, Hall starred opposite Samantha Jade in Pretty Woman: The Musical in the lead role of Edward Lewis at the Lyric Theatre in October and Theatre Royal Sydney in November 2025.

Alongside his former Neighbours co-star Bonnie Anderson, Hall will star as Glenn Wheatley in Whispering Jack: The John Farnham Musical at the Roslyn Packer Theatre in November 2026.

== Acting credits ==
Film and television performances
Year	Title	Role	Notes
2014	ANZAC Girls	Hal Cooper	Guest role
2014	Devil's Playground	Finton Kelly	Guest role
2015	The Link	Jay	Short film
2016	Brock	Phillip 'Pin' Brock	Guest role
2016–2022, 2025	Neighbours	Ned Willis	Regular role
2017	Love Child	Alan Fitzgerald	Guest role
2017	HActresses	Auditioning hot actor	Guest role
2022	Call Me Chihiro	Terao / Man 5 / Hosokawa	Voice over
2022	Beat	Liam	
2023	Warnie	Mark Waugh	Guest role
2023	Better Man	Robbie Alt	
2024	Total Control	James	Guest role

Stage performances
Year	Title	Role	Theatre	Notes
2014–2016	Les Misérables	Ensemble	Various (tour)	Also understudy for Marius
2017	Only Heaven Knows	Tim	Hayes Theatre	
2023	Elvis: A Musical Revolution	Sam Phillips	Various (tour)	
2025	Pretty Woman: The Musical	Edward Lewis	Lyric Theatre, Theatre Royal Sydney	
2026	Whispering Jack: The John Farnham Musical	Glenn Wheatley	Roslyn Packer Theatre	
