= Simon Warner =

- Born: Simon Warner; 1967 (age 58–59); Dhekelia, Cyprus
- Genres: Orchestral pop, Britpop, chanson
- Occupations: Musician, songwriter
- Instruments: Vocals, guitars,
- Years active: 1985–1998
- Labels: Rough Trade Records, One Little Indian Records

Simon Warner (born 1967) is an English musician and songwriter, known mainly for his 1997 orchestral pop album Waiting Rooms. Briefly active in both the 1980s and 1990s, Warner proved to be a polarising figure whose blatantly theatrical musical and performance style (inspired in part by Jacques Brel and Anthony Newley) attracted praise and condemnation in roughly equal measure.

After the release of Waiting Rooms (a commercial failure with reviews which ranged from the ecstatic to the dismissive), Warner briefly worked as a string arranger for Sneaker Pimps and began work on a never-completed second album before quitting the industry and the public eye altogether (becoming a minor cult British pop figure in the process). Warner broke cover in a Mojo interview in summer 2014, in which he implied that he still had an interest in returning to music in the future.

== Discography ==
=== Singles ===
- 'It's A Perfect Day, Baby' (EG Records, 1985)
- 'The Wrong Girl' (Rough Trade Records, 1997)
- 'Wake Up The Streets' (Rough Trade Records, 1997)

=== Albums ===
- Waiting Rooms (Rough Trade Records/One Little Indian Records, 1997)
