= Ned Willis =

- Neighbours character
- Portrayed by: Ben Hall
- Duration: 2016–2022, 2025
- First appearance: 6 April 2016
- Last appearance: 11 December 2025
- Introduced by: Jason Herbison
In-universe information
- Occupation: Tattoo artist; Barman; Hotel porter; Artist; Manager of Harold's Café
- Family: Willis
- Father: Brad Willis
- Mother: Beth Brennan
- Stepmother: Terese Willis
- Half-brothers: Josh Willis
- Half-sisters: Paige Smith; Imogen Willis; Piper Willis
- Grandfathers: Doug Willis
- Grandmothers: Pam Willis
- Nephews: Gabriel Smith
- First cousins: Roxy Willis

Ned Willis is a fictional character from the Australian television soap opera Neighbours, played by Ben Hall. The character was created in the early 1990s, but he was not seen on-screen. Over twenty years later, the show's UK broadcaster Channel 5 confirmed that Hall had been cast in the role and would make a short guest appearance. He made his debut in the episode broadcast on 6 April 2016. Series producer Jason Herbison had plans to promote Hall to the regular cast, but the actor was unsure about making a long-term commitment to the show. Following his initial guest stint, Hall returned twice in August and November 2016. Ned is often portrayed as a complex, manipulative character, but he is a good person at heart. He tries to do things for the right reasons, but often goes about it in the wrong way. Hall thought Ned was close to becoming a bad boy at times, a trait he enjoyed playing. The character was introduced during the Hotel Death Trap storyline, in which the boiler room at Lassiters Hotel explodes, killing his half-brother and grandfather.

His early storylines focused on the strained relationship he had with his father Brad Willis (Kip Gamblin) and his attraction to Brad's partner Lauren Turner (Kate Kendall), which culminated in a kiss between them. His storylines during his second and third stints included an on-off relationship with Elly Conway (Jodi Anasta), the introduction of his married former lover Regan Davis (Sabeena Manalis), and his arrest for arson. Hall later reprised the role and returned on 20 June 2018, as part of the regular cast. Kendall also reprised her role as Lauren to help facilitate Ned's permanent move to Erinsborough, as it emerges that he still has feelings for her and needs to give her and Brad some space. Ned later forms a romantic relationship with Elly's younger sister Bea Nilsson (Bonnie Anderson). Later, Ned embarks on a polyamorous relationship with Amy Greenwood (Jacinta Stapleton) and Levi Canning (Richie Morris), a storyline which was critiqued by fans and reporters. Hall departed the serial on 8 June 2022, but later returned as part of the then series finale and again in 2025 for the show's final episodes.

== Creation and casting ==
The character of Ned Willis was created in the early 90s shortly after his parents Brad Willis (then Scott Michaelson) and Beth Brennan (Natalie Imbruglia) departed the show. The character was never seen on-screen, but he was often mentioned by various Willis family members. In September 2015, the serial's executive producer, Jason Herbison, told Inside Soap of the show's intentions to introduce Ned to and said that production was "keeping him in reserve". On 10 March 2016, the show's UK broadcaster Channel 5 announced that the character was being introduced on 6 April with actor Ben Hall cast in the role. Hall later revealed that he had initially auditioned for another role. Ned's introduction meant that all of Brad's children would be seen together on-screen for the first time. Hall later confirmed that Ned would not be a permanent cast member, as he had only been brought in for a short guest stint.

In June 2016, Sophie Dainty of Digital Spy confirmed that Hall had returned to filming, after the actor posted various photos of himself on the set to his social media accounts. When asked if he always knew that the character was going to return, Hall replied, "It wasn't decided at that point, actually. It just came up and when I found out the opportunity was there to come back, I took it gladly. It's been a really fun period of shooting now that I know the ropes a little bit more." Hall thought that the character might have been brought back as he had proved popular with viewers on social media. Ned returned on 10 August.

Herbison later revealed that they had plans to promote Hall to the regular cast, but the actor was unsure about making a long-term commitment to the show. Hall admitted that he was initially had doubts about joining the cast full time, as he had been offered some other acting jobs, but he found himself enjoying the role and considered committing to a longer stint.

== Development ==
=== Characterisation ===
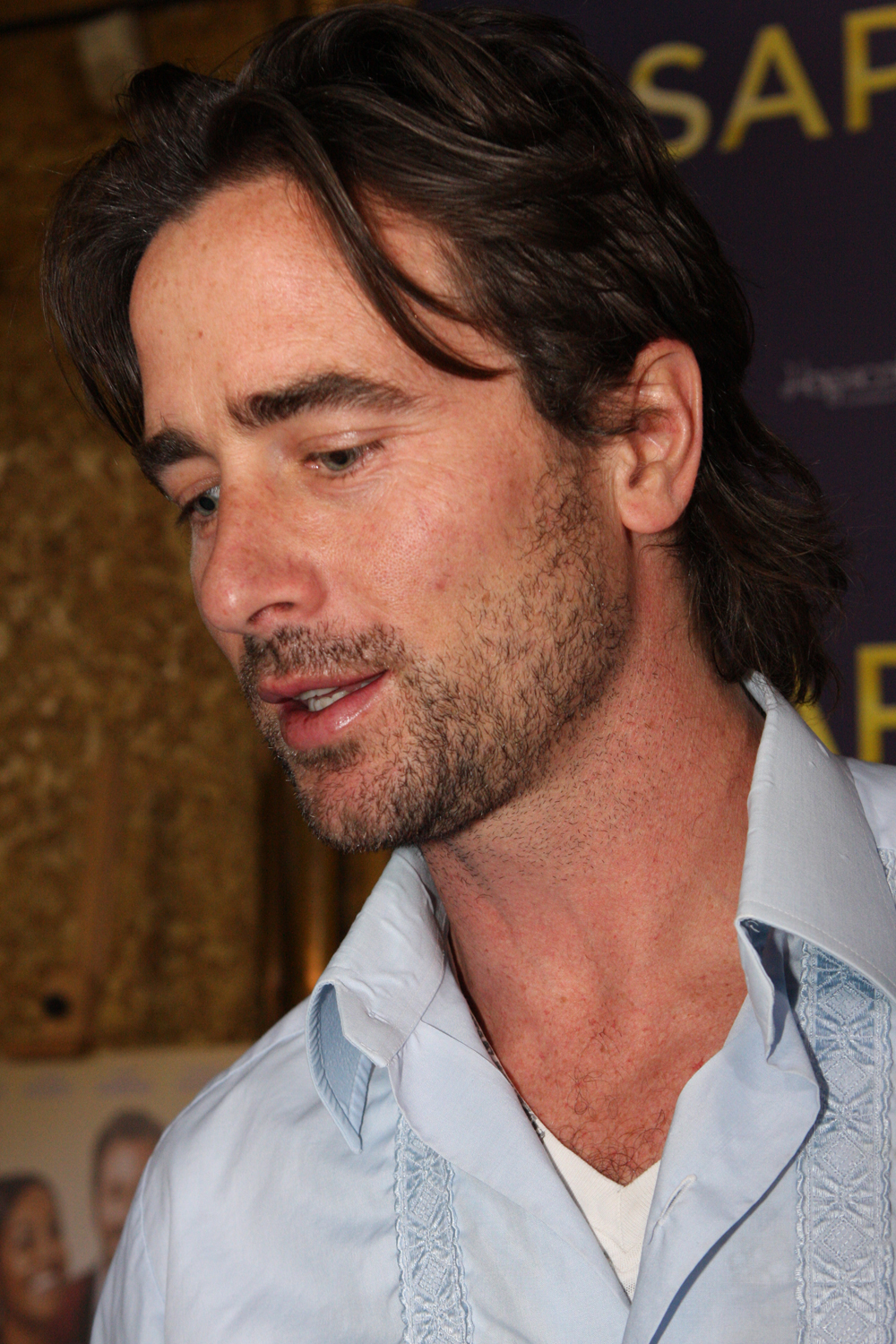
Upon his introduction, Ned had a fractured relationship with his father Brad, played by Kip Gamblin (pictured).

Hall explained that in Ned's fictional backstory, he was left with Beth after her marriage to Brad ended and they moved to Sydney. Some time later, Beth sent Ned to live with his grandparents Pam (Sue Jones) and Doug Willis (Terence Donovan) in Darwin. Hall also said that Ned has "a bit of history" with Doug due to a recent event. Hall liked that Ned is a tattoo artist, deeming the job "cool". He also believed that there had been very few tattoo artists in the show's history. Hall commented that Ned's occupation would lead to some "mischief".

Ahead of his arrival on-screen, Hall described Ned as being a "very complex" and "quite manipulative" character because "he has had a bit to deal with". Hall said his favourite aspect of Ned's personality was that he "prefers actions over words". Ned would rather go and do something about the issue instead of just talking about it. Hall continued, "He shows his feelings through actions rather than just saying meaningless words." Hall also liked that Ned tries to "better himself", but remains conflicted on the inside. Ned often finds that his anger gets the better of him, especially when it comes to Brad.

In an interview with Sarah Ellis of Inside Soap, Hall thought Ned had the potential to be a bad boy character, and he enjoyed playing him when he flirted with that line. But he also called Ned "quite a good person at heart", as he does not act out of spite and is not deliberately malicious. He continued, "He genuinely tries to do things for the right reasons – although he goes about it in the wrong way. But let's just say I wouldn't want him to become too much of a goody two-shoes!"

=== Introduction ===
Hall admitted to being "a bit nervous" ahead of Ned's arrival. He described Ned's entrance as "a massive moment" and he hoped that it would live up to fans' expectations of the character. He also said, "I really wanted to make an entrance as a fully developed, interesting character." The character made his debut during the Hotel Death Trap storyline, in which the boiler room at Lassiters Hotel explodes. Ned is invited to Erinsborough by his grandfather Doug, but they are forced to evacuate the hotel following the explosion . Later that day, Ned comes face-to-face with his father, Brad. Doug witnesses their reunion, before collapsing and dying. Doug's death came shortly after Ned's half-brother Josh Willis (Harley Bonner) was also killed off.

Hall believed that Ned was willing to try and get along with his father. He said that Ned comes to Erinsborough with the "right intentions", although he is unsure what he will achieve. The actor continued, "It's a lot of pain to get over, it's a lot of hurt to be left by your father. To suddenly try and reconcile after twenty years is not going to be easy!" Rebekah Elmaloglou who plays Brad's second wife Terese Willis told Sarah Ellis from Inside Soap that Terese feels a lot of guilt for Brad and Ned's fractured relationship, as she is partly responsible for taking Brad away from Beth. Hall also said that Ned would enjoy getting to know his sisters and becoming part of the family again. He added that Ned would have to learn how to be both a brother and a son, which he would get right and wrong at times.

Brad and Ned's relationship is further strained when Brad reports his son to the police. The storyline begins as Ned's half-sister Piper Willis (Mavournee Hazel) realises that there are holes in Ned's account of the day of the explosion. Piper tells her parents, and while Brad feels he cannot confront Ned, Terese insists that he goes to the police. Meanwhile, Ned confides in Brad's partner Lauren Turner (Kate Kendall) about where he really was. When Ned is brought down to the police station for questioning, he soon learns that Brad was the one who reported him. Ned leaves the station and declares that his father is dead to him. He plans to leave Erinsborough, but stays when Lauren and Terese tell him that his mother tried to keep him and Brad apart.

=== Crush on Lauren Turner ===
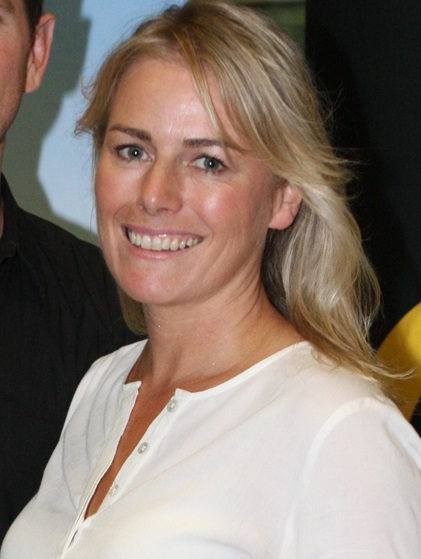
Ned develops a crush on his father's partner Lauren Turner, played by Kate Kendall (pictured).

During an interview published on the show's official website, Hall commented that Ned would develop a "risqué" crush on someone who lives on Ramsay Street. In an interview for the Neighbuzz podcast, Hall said that producers originally planned for Ned to have a crush on Terese. Ned forms an immediate bond with Brad's partner Lauren Turner, as she is caring and gentle towards him, which is something he has not had since he left home. An Inside Soap columnist noted that Ned's loyalties clearly lay with Lauren instead of his father, and they wondered if Ned was potentially "blurring the lines of her motherly concern". Hall commented that Ned was raised by a single mother, so Lauren's kind nature helps to settle him in and make Erinsborough feel like home. He is aware that she is Brad's partner and "a big no-go zone" when it comes to any romantic feelings. Ned grows even closer to Lauren when she asks him pose for her art project.

Ned soon becomes suspicious that Brad is cheating on Lauren with his former wife Terese, after he sees them talking and sharing a hug. Hall said Ned is "hypersensitive" to anything that Brad does that reminds him of what he did to his mother Beth, so when he sees Brad spending time with Terese and not Lauren, he concludes that something is going on between them. Ned shares his suspicions with his sister Piper, but she tells him that he is mistaken, and that Brad and Terese are mostly likely spending time together because of what happened to Josh. Of the situation, Hall commented, "Ned thinks Brad is just falling into his old ways of cheating – he wants to tell Lauren what he saw, but he's waiting for the right moment." Ned later raises his concerns with Brad, but he is left "frustrated" when his father refuses to discuss his actions.

Lauren tries to help Ned and Brad bond, but Ned finds it easier to talk with her. Kendall said that her character is aware of Ned's flirting and innuendo, which leaves her feeling a little nervous around him. Kendall also explained that when Ned insists that something is going on between Brad and Terese, Lauren is quick to dismiss his concerns, but she soon becomes suspicious too. She confronts Brad, but when he refuses to give her a straight answer, she is left feeling confused. When Lauren is alone with Ned, she vents to him about Brad and Terese and tells him that she cares about him. Ned then kisses Lauren, but she pushes him away and he quickly runs off. Kendall said Lauren is "really shocked, and feels incredibly uncomfortable about the whole situation." Ellis (Inside Soap) pointed out that Lauren had been seen looking at Ned's muscles and wondered if she actually enjoyed the kiss, but Kendall insisted that there was a big difference between noticing Ned's attractiveness and acting on it. Lauren had no intention of doing anything.

Brad eventually admits to Ned that he and Terese are involved in organising a false testimony for the upcoming trial surrounding the explosion. The confession brings Brad and Ned together, as he also wants to see justice for Josh's death. However, when Lauren says she is going to tell Brad about the kiss, Ned persuades her not to, saying it would ruin the relationship that he has built with his father. Kendall thought that Ned was being "quite manipulative" in that moment. Lauren agree to keep quiet, but warns Ned that she will speak to Brad if he crosses the line with her again. The truth about the kiss is later revealed when Piper overhears Ned and Lauren arguing. She insists that they tell Brad, and as Lauren is uncomfortable about keeping it from him any longer, they confess what happened, leaving Brad "stunned." The actress praised the direction of the storyline, calling it "a gutsy move, and very left-field". She also enjoyed working with Hall on the story.

Returning to Erinsborough is "awkward" for Ned, especially when Brad thinks that he still has feelings for Lauren. Hall believed that Ned was remorseful about the kiss, and he wanted to show Brad and Lauren that he had moved on by entering into a new relationship. Hall also explained that Ned still cares for Lauren and he turns to her for advice, but he has put any romantic feelings aside, so they can form a friendship instead. Hall also admitted that he thought it was "a bit weird" of Ned to feel that way about Lauren in the first place. Ned is surprised by Brad and Lauren's engagement, as he knows how "fragile" their relationship has been since the kiss. Hall added, "But Ned wants to be happy for them and he wants them to be happy too. Ned is not malicious, so once he understands it, he's okay with it and wants it to work."

=== Relationship with Elly Conway ===
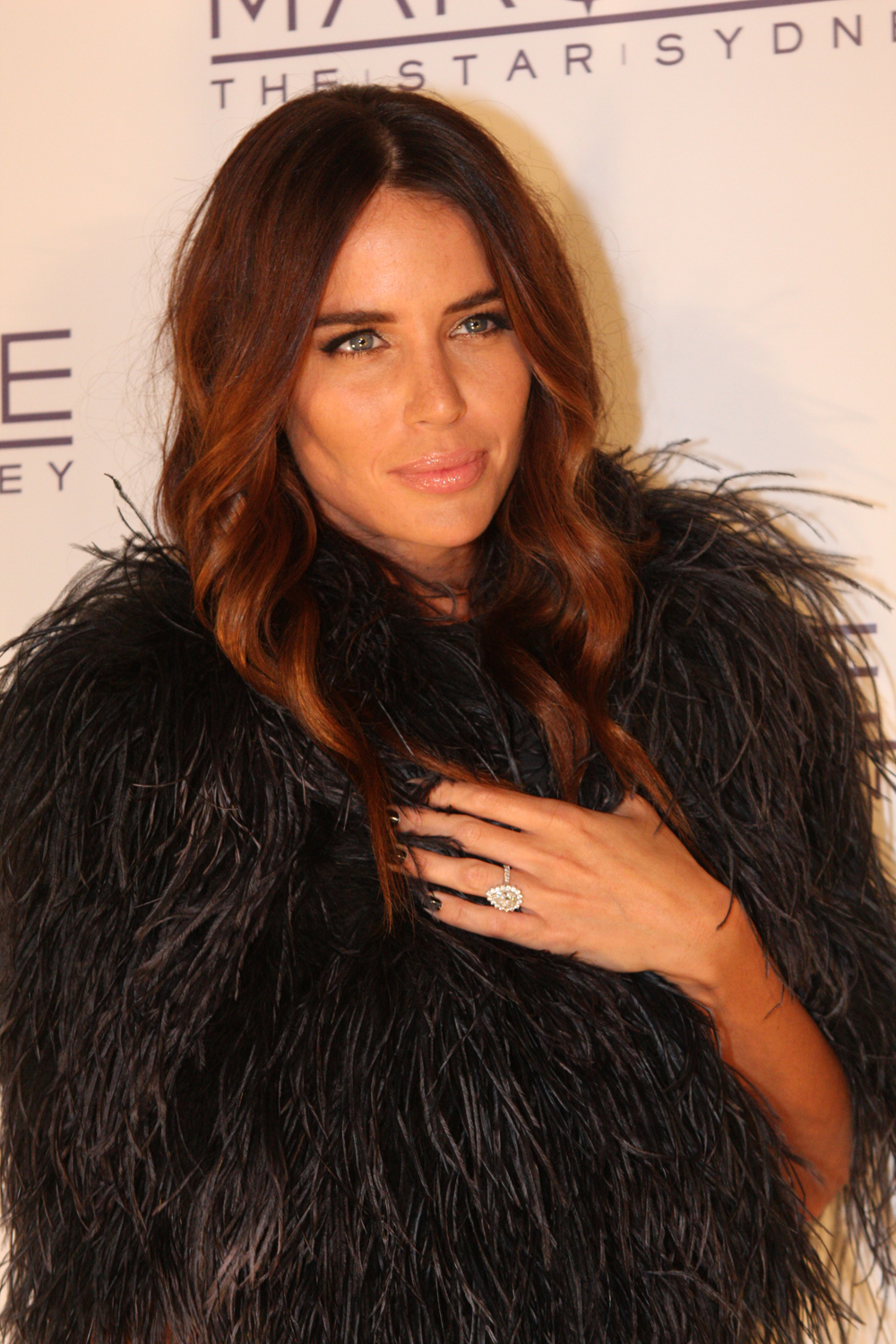
Ned develops a romantic relationship with Elly Conway played by Jodi Anasta (pictured).

Following Hall's return to filming, the actor confirmed that Ned would be receiving a new love interest and producers paired his character with the newly introduced Elly Conway (Jodi Anasta). In a bid to show his father that he is over his crush on Lauren, Ned asks Elly out on a date, and she accepts as she is "intrigued" by Ned. Ned asks Elly out on a second date, but she turns him down and attempts to play hard to get, so Ned asks Madison Robinson (Sarah Ellen) out instead to make Elly jealous. Hall told Sarah Ellis of Inside Soap that Ned knows what Elly is doing, so he "throws it back at her!" Hall also believed Madison was in on his plan. Later that night, Ned meets Elly in the Back Lane Bar in the city and after they have a small argument, they decide to stop playing games and give their relationship a go.

Hall described Ned and Elly's coupling as "a very passionate, fiery, 'up and down' sort of relationship." He went on to say that the pair's romance was initially based on lust and was quite "unstable", but it had potential to develop into love and become a long-term relationship, which would play out over a number of months. Hall thought that the characters were a good match, as they both had passionate personas. He added that arguing was their way of showing they care about one another.

Producers later threw an obstacle in the couple's way by introducing Regan Davis (Sabeena Manalis), Ned's married former lover. Hall hinted at the story arc during his Digital Spy interview, saying "When he gets back to the Street, he's running away from another problem because he's slept with someone and found out that she's married. He's a bit edgy about that!" The storyline begins with Elly confronting Ned about a lock of blonde hair she has found in his wallet, as she believes it is Lauren's. Ned explains that it belongs to a woman he dated during his time away from Erinsborough. Shortly after, Regan comes to town and witnesses Ned kissing Elly at The Waterhole. Ned lies to Elly that he has never seen Regan before, but Elly refuses to believe him.

The reason for Regan's appearance is revealed when she tells Ned that her husband has found out about her affair. She warns Ned that her husband will be out for revenge. Anasta commented that Elly notices them talking and realising that she had been lied to, she feels "uneasy and threatened". Elly then embarrasses Regan by calling her out during a quiz night at the pub, but Ned is equally humiliated and cannot believe Elly acted that way, leaving their relationship in doubt.

Writers soon devised a break up story for Elly and Ned, beginning with the revelation that Regan's husband was recurring villain Jacka Hills (Brad McMurray). Jacka asks Stephanie Scully (Carla Bonner) to find the man that his wife has been having an affair with, and Steph soon works out that it is Ned. She warns him that it is just a matter of time before Jacka learns the truth, leaving Ned "terrified". Steph suggests he leaves town, but Ned is "reluctant" as his relationship with Elly is progressing well. Ned eventually decides to break up with Elly to keep her safe. Shortly after, Regan begs Ned to help her and he takes her out of town. Upon his return, Ned finds Elly enjoying a drink with Jacka, who she does not know, in The Waterhole. Knowing that it is part of Jacka's revenge plan, Ned "sees red" and a fight breaks out. Ned later decides to leave town, concluding Hall's second stint with the show.

=== Second return ===
Hall returned for a second time in November 2016. Ned returns to Erinsborough for Brad and Lauren's wedding. His last storyline is revisited when Jacka's mother Maxine Cowper (Kate Hood) turns up at the wedding reception. It emerges that Ned burnt down Maxine's house, and he is soon arrested for arson. The scenes featuring Ned's arrest were shot out of sync with the rest of the wedding storyline, as an actor was unavailable to film at the time.

The character departed the show on 17 February 2017, after being written out for a third time. Writers decided to end Ned's relationship with Elly before his departure. On-screen, Elly explains to Ned that she needs to be single and independent for a while. Ned accepts her decision, having realised that they just have "bad timing." After saying goodbye to his family, Ned leaves Erinsborough for Gold Coast, where he plans to set up a new tattoo parlour. Hall later thanked viewers for their support on his social media accounts, and added "it was an absolute honour to be a part of the crazy world of Erinsborough and work with such kind and talented people." The actor did not rule out a potential return to the show in the future.

=== Reintroduction (2018) ===
On 18 May 2018, the show's UK broadcaster Channel 5 announced through its official Neighbours Twitter account that Hall had reprised his role. Of his return to the show, Hall stated "It's really nice to back around familiar faces and also some new ones and pick up where the character left off. Ned is very complex, which makes him interesting and a lot of fun to play." Two days later, Hall confirmed that he had joined the regular cast, making Ned a permanent character. Hall admitted that he had no idea he would be returning to Neighbours again, as his last stint felt final to him. He was keen to see his character's dark side emerge, calling it "the most interesting part of the character for me – the fine line that he walks between being a good and bad person. It's exciting!" Ned returns during the episode broadcast on 20 June and is immediately "embroiled in an altercation". He is accidentally punched by Leo Tanaka (Tim Kano), who is trying to provoke Dilhan Ozdil (Kyle Hazebroek) into a fight.

Kilkelly reported that Ned would be hiding a secret upon his return, as he is seen calling an unknown person and telling them no one knows why is he back in Erinsborough. Shortly after, Kendall reprised her role as Lauren Turner, as she returns to Erinsborough for "a final showdown" with Ned. It emerges that he still has feelings for Lauren and Terese asks her to come and sort things out between them. In scenes between the pair, Lauren admits that she is attracted to Ned, but wants to make her marriage to Brad work, which is hard with Ned there too. Terese then invites Ned to stay with her permanently and offers him a job at Lassiters Hotel, which he accepts. Hall thought that with Kendall working on the show as a director, it would be easier to write Lauren back in if the writers ever wanted to explore the relationship between her and Ned further. He told Johnathon Hughes of the Radio Times: "Ned still has a bit of heartache there as his feelings for her were strong and he was confused. I think our producer would love to get Lauren, Brad or even Ned's mum Beth in the show at some point, there's certainly scope for that."

Ned soon becomes involved in Piper's relationship with Cassius Grady (Joe Davidson), as he is suspicious of him. Hall said Ned is "very protective" over Piper, so he keeps an eye on Cassius, as he finds his secretive behaviour odd. His suspicions are raised when he catches Cassius lying to Piper, but Hall said Ned is "conflicted" as Cassius also helps him out. Ned later sees Cassius with a mystery woman and initially believes Cassius is cheating on Piper, but Cassius explains that the woman Elissa Gallow (Verity Charlton) is his mother, who does not approve of his relationship with Piper. Hall told Hughes (Radio Times) that while Ned is tempted to tell Piper about Elissa, he acknowledges that she is "very fragile" and wants to protect her. Hall also said that if Ned's suspicions had been wrong, then it could have damaged his relationship with Piper. It later emerges that Cassius killed his father Hamish Roche (Sean Taylor) and let Piper's former boyfriend Tyler Brennan (Travis Burns) take the blame. Hall stated that with Ned's temper and tendency to react with violence, there was potential for confrontation between them should he find out the truth. He thought the plot could lead to Ned's dark side coming out, as Ned would want to protect his family.

=== Relationship with Bea Nilsson ===
Writers later paired Ned with Elly's younger sister Bea Nilsson (Bonnie Anderson). Hall said that their friendship starts off "coincidentally", as Ned offers to walk Bea home when she thinks she has seen her former partner and villain Finn Kelly (Rob Mills). He commented "their friendship blossoms from there – but it's early days..." Hall also said that while Ned is definitely over Elly, and their romance ended amicably, if he and Bea became a couple it could be "uncomfortable and a bit weird". He explained that Ned and Bea are drawn together by "mutual pain". They find that they can talk to each other about similar experiences, which helps forge a bond between them. Hall believed the couple made a good match, saying "Ned knows Bea has been through a lot having been manipulated and fooled by Finn and realises this needs to be a slow burn, she is very delicate right now." He added that the pair would get closer as their friendship develops, as Bea also voices her suspicions about Cassius and they team up to protect Piper. Anderson told Alice Penwill of Inside Soap that Bea enjoys her friendship with Ned and she feels safe with him, although she puts her guard up occasionally. Ned and Bea soon share a kiss, and Anderson said that Bea is falling for him. Bea's best friend Yashvi Rebecchi (Olivia Junkeer) develops a crush on Ned. Anderson told Penwill that Bea is initially unaware of her friend's feelings, but she thought Bea would not like having someone else "having eyes for the guy she's falling for". Anderson also said that Bea's intrigue over Finn's whereabouts also gets in the way of her relationship with Ned, who is not happy that she is determined to find him.

=== Departure ===
On 14 March 2022, Daniel Kilkelly of Digital Spy confirmed that Hall would be exiting the show, after reaching the end of his contract. Ned's departure was already planned and written before it was announced Neighbours would be ending later in the year. Further details about the character's exit were released on 1 May. Kilkelly reported that Ned's exit would air on 10 May in the UK and on 9 June in Australia. Ned decides to leave Erinsborough following the end of his relationship with Amy Greenwood (Jacinta Stapleton). Ned feels "caught" between her and Harlow Robinson (Jemma Donovan), with whom he had an affair with. Zima Anderson reprises her role as Ned's cousin, Roxy Willis, for a cameo appearance, as she gives him some advice, which results in Ned deciding to move to Sydney for a fresh start. He leaves after saying goodbye to his friends and family, including Amy. Hall explained of his departure, "That was just the end of my contract. For the show, once they knew that Channel 5 wasn't picking up the [Neighbours] contract, they needed to get some storylines sorted out. There was definitely a bunch of cast leaving in order to open up some new storylines, ways for people to come back and all that sort of stuff. I think it made sense for Ned to go at the time." Hall told Daniel Kilkelly of Digital Spy that he believed Ned's exit storyline was suitable, saying, "You know what? He came in as a bit of a bad boy, and he leaves as a bit of a bad boy. I didn't mind that ending, really. I thought it was quite fitting for Ned." It was later announced that Hall reprised his role for the series finale. Speaking of his lack of scenes with his on screen mother, Hall told Digital Spy, "I would love to do a scene with Natalie Imbruglia. I'm open to that. It's up to the powers that be." In November 2025, it was reported that Hall would briefly return as Ned the following month for the soap's final episode of its revival series.

== Storylines ==
Ned is invited to Lassiter's Hotel by his grandfather Doug (Terence Donovan) and half-brother Josh (Harley Bonner), who hope to reunite him with his estranged father Brad (Kip Gamblin), though Ned refuses to meet Brad. The hotel's boiler explodes and while helping those affected, Ned learns that Josh died in the explosion. Ned then approaches Brad, but after witnessing their reunion Doug also dies from a heart attack. Brad's partner Lauren Turner (Kate Kendall) notices a gang tattoo on Ned's chest, and his grandmother Pam (Sue Jones) reveals that Ned helped a local gang to rob her house. She and Ned soon reconcile. Ned gives his younger half-sister Piper (Mavournee Hazel) a tattoo, after she lies that she has Brad's permission. Ned and Brad's relationship is further strained, and Ned publicly embarrasses him. Piper finds that Ned's story about the day of the explosion has inconsistencies, so Brad reports him to the police. Ned is questioned, but he is soon released as he has an alibi. He plans to return to Sydney, but stays when Lauren and Terese Willis (Rebekah Elmaloglou) tell him that Beth deliberately kept him away from Brad. Ned grows close to Lauren and kisses her. She agrees not to tell Brad, however, Piper overhears them discussing the kiss, and Lauren changes her mind. Ned takes all the blame and he decides to return home.

Piper invites Ned to Brad and Terese's divorce party. He forms a relationship with Elly Conway (Jodi Anasta). Ned's former lover Regan Davis (Sabeena Manalis) comes to warn him that her husband Jacka Hills (Brad McMurray) has found out about their affair and is after revenge. When Jacka is released from prison, Ned breaks up with Elly to keep her safe and he takes Regan out of town. When he returns, he finds Elly talking with Jacka at The Waterhole and Ned attempts to fight Jacka. Ned announces he is leaving town and Elly decides to go with him, however, Ned leaves without her. He returns for Brad and Lauren's wedding. Jacka's mother Maxine Cowper (Kate Hood) turns up at the reception, and it emerges that Ned unintentionally started a fire that burnt her house down. Ned is arrested for arson and he receives a community sentence, after Elly acts as a character witness. Ned tells Elly he loves her. Ned is offered the chance to buy a tattoo parlour on the Gold Coast and he decides to accept. After Elly clears up a misunderstanding in which Ned thinks she had sex with Mark Brennan (Scott McGregor), Ned asks her to come to Gold Coast with him, but Elly tells him that she wants to be single for a while. After a farewell party with his family, Ned leaves Erinsborough.

Just over a year later, Ned returns to Erinsborough. He tries to break up a fight involving Leo Tanaka (Tim Kano) and Dilhan Ozdil (Kyle Hazebroek), but Leo accidentally punches him in the face. When he arrives at Number 22, he tells Piper and Terese that he got hit by falling luggage on the plane. He also tells Terese that his tattoo studio is going broke. Terese's assistant Chloe Brennan (April Rose Pengilly) attempts to get Ned to open up about how he got his black eye, but Ned leaves when he learns she is Mark's sister. Mark works out Leo hit Ned and assumes they fought over Elly, but they assure her that was not the case. Ned later admits to Terese that he is in love with Lauren, who admits there was a spark between them, but she is committed to Brad. Ned decides to sell his business and stay with Terese, who gets him a job as a porter at Lassiters Hotel. Ned stands in for Leo's brother David (Takaya Honda) in a set of engagement photos with Aaron Brennan (Matt Wilson). He also deduces that Leo has a crush on Terese and encourages him to act on his feelings. Ned befriends Gary Canning (Damien Richardson) and advises him on what to do with some money left with him by criminal Jeremy Sluggett (Tamblyn Lord).

Ned walks Elly's sister Bea Nilsson (Bonnie Anderson) home when she fears that her former boyfriend Finn Kelly (Rob Mills) is following her. They continue to meet up for late night walks, but Ned becomes increasingly tired. He later falls asleep in the hotel's sauna and develops hyperthermia. Ned is found by Yashvi Rebecchi (Olivia Junkeer), who calls him an ambulance. To repay Yashvi, he offers to help her with her football training, but she develops a crush on him. He tries to let her down gently and admits that he has feelings for Bea. Ned and Bea investigate Piper's boyfriend Cassius Grady (Joe Davidson), and Ned later tells Bea that he has feelings for her. They kiss, but Bea runs off and later tells him that she is not ready for a relationship. Cassius is attacked in prison and Ned admits that it is his fault, as he spoke to an old gang friend about him and they arranged the attack. Bea stops spending time with him because of the incident. Ned apologises to Cassius and Piper. Bea begins spending time with Ned again, and she allows him to read her diary. They begin dating and he supports her when she secures regular singing gigs at The Waterhole. Ned helps Mark apprehend Ivan Renshaw (Michael Shanahan) after he shoots Terese.

Ned warns Finn's brother Shaun Watkins (Brad Moller) to leave Bea alone, and Bea struggles to forgive him for interfering. They soon reconcile, and are caught having sex at the garage by Bea's new boss Heath Kabel (Tim Conlon). Ned later rescues Bea from a fire at the garage and supports her when Finn wakes up from his coma with amnesia. When Shaun informs the Kennedys and Bea that Finn will be remaining in Erinsborough, Ned asks him to make Finn leave, before punching him. Mark breaks up the fight and arrests Ned. Shaun does not press charges after Bea intervenes. After both Bea and Elly give sympathetic testimonies, Finn receives a non-custodial sentence and the Kennedys agree to house him. Ned's anger at Elly causes tension between himself and Bea. He later believes that he has witnessed Finn intimidating Bea, but she assures him that he is mistaken. Ned is reunited with his cousin, Roxy Willis, when she moves in with him and Terese. He is suspicious about her reasons for moving to Erinsborough, and she tells him that she got in with the wrong crowd and needed to leave. Ned gets involved in Harry Sinclair's (Paul Dawber) plot to frame Finn. But when Harry releases cyanide gas at the community centre, resulting in Bea's hospitalisation, Ned goes to the police. After Bea learns of Ned's involvement, she ends their relationship.

Ned contemplates leaving Erinsborough, but decides to stay and face the consequences of his actions. He later receives 240 hours of community service. Terese confides in Ned that Roxy's older boyfriend Vance Abernethy (Conrad Coleby) is also her former boyfriend, and he questions whether she has feelings for him, but Terese is sure it is just nostalgia. Finn attempts to bring Ned and Bea back together, but Ned realises that Bea was right to end their relationship. Yashvi kisses Ned when he attempts to remove some food from her face. He insists that he just wants to be friends, as he is still getting over Bea. He later buys Bea time at a recording studio as a friendly gesture. Ned soon notices the closeness between Bea and Finn, and talks it over with Leo, who advises him to move on with Yashvi. After spending a fun afternoon together, Ned and Yashvi kiss. After Yashvi calls Ned her boyfriend in front of her father Shane Rebecchi (Nicholas Coghlan), Ned tells her that they need to take things slow. He attends a Rebecchi family brunch, where he tells Shane about his desire to take things slowly with Yashvi, and Shane accepts their relationship. On his way to meet Yashvi at Lassiters for a date, Ned sees Bea and Finn kissing. He also learns that Yashvi has been running dark tours of Erinsborough focusing on Finn's crimes, and he cancels their date.

Shane demands that he explains his behaviour to Yashvi and Ned confronts her about the tours, but she feels that he is more concerned about Bea. Ned realises that he needs to commit to Yashvi properly and tells her about Bea and Finn, before re-booking their hotel room. Bea turns to Ned when she and Finn are harassed by Alfie Sutton (Harry Borland), but, aware of his commitment to Yashvi, Ned refuses to intimidate Alfie for her. Ned defends Yashvi to Shane and Dipi, after they confront her about the dark tours. Yashvi and Shane's relationship becomes strained and she spends a lot of time with Ned. He and Toadie encourage Yashvi to make amends with Shane, but they end up arguing and Yashvi tries moving in with Ned, but he tells her there is no room. While Ned is waiting for a flight to Queensland for Terese's wedding to Paul Robinson (Stefan Dennis), he meets Scarlett Brady (Christie Whelan Browne), who has been jilted by her fiancé. Scarlett becomes obsessed with Ned and follows him back to Erinsborough, where she secures a job at the hotel alongside him. Scarlett manipulates Ned and Yashvi so that they break up. Scarlett tells Ned that she is being stalked by her former fiancé and he comforts her when a brick is thrown through the window. Ned is later struck by a motorbike in a hit and run and dislocates his shoulder. He stays at Number 32, where Scarlett seduces him.

During a romantic getaway, the pair dress up for Halloween and Scarlett appears in a wedding dress. Over dinner, Scarlett starts talking about their future and says that they are meant to be together. Uncomfortable, Ned tries to leave, but Scarlett stabs him with a cheese knife. She then chases him through a maze, as Bea and Yashvi enter to rescue him. Bea manages to help Ned escape and he collapses by a tree, where Scarlett finds him and attempts to kill him. Yashvi tackles her to the ground and Scarlett is arrested. Ned struggles with PTSD in the wake of his stabbing. While dreaming about the attack, he accidentally punches Yashvi when she comes to see him. While working out at The Shed, Ned meets Kane Jones (Barry Conrad), who offers him an alternative way to work out his anger. Ned shows up at the address and finds a fight club. Ned wins his first fight and continues to go back. Aaron discovers what Ned is doing and urges him to stop and go to therapy. Ned begins counselling for his anger issues, but Kane pressures him to return to fighting. When Ned turns up at the warehouse, he sees Bea in a fight and manages to pull her out before she is seriously injured. He tells Yashvi about the fights and decides not to go back, but he soon receives threats. Yashvi gets the fight ring shut down by the police and she is later injured when Kane spikes her drink with broken glass. Kane is soon arrested. Ned and Yashvi reconcile at New Years, but Shane strongly opposes their relationship. Ned rediscovers his passion for art when he is asked to paint a mural of Sonya Rebecchi (Eve Morey) over the Erinsborough History Wall.

Yashvi begins training to join the police force. Zenin Alexio (Axle Whitehead) threatens Ned, as he think he has told Yashvi about the illegal gun ring he is running at the fight club. After trying to keep Zenin away from Yashvi, Ned eventually goes to the police. Ned worries when Yashvi goes undercover to investigate Zenin, and he is soon caught in the middle of a police operation to catch Zenin with the guns. Zenin holds Ned hostage at gunpoint, but Yashvi manages to distract him and he is arrested. Although Yashvi scolds Ned for his reckless behaviour, she tries to stop a newly promoted Mark Brennan from charging Ned. Despite winning Employee of the Month, Ned becomes discontented working at Lassiters and Terese arranges for him to manage the relaunch of the Lassiters rooftop pool. Although his body positivity theme goes down well, the pressure of arranging the event causes him to quit his job to start a career as an artist. Yashvi supports him, but Shane and Paul disapprove of his new venture. He initially struggles to get work, but soon comes up with a plan to turn the Backpackers into an art and exhibition space called The Hive. To fund his new venture and an upcoming exhibition, Ned begins selling artistic semi-nude photos through Fandangle, a content subscription service. A mysterious client pays him for several nude photos and a video, and Ned is alarmed when they seemingly track him to Erinsborough. When his fan asks to meet up, Ned is horrified to discover that Scarlett is responsible. She threatens to expose his nude photos unless he paints her portrait for her new fiancé. Ned initially goes along with her demands, but Scarlett's behaviour becomes more erratic. He confesses to Yashvi, who is furious at his continued secretive behaviour. Scarlett reports Ned to the police, claiming he is stalking her. She gatecrashes his art exhibition and switches his entry to a prestigious art prize – a painting of Yashvi – with her own portrait. Enraged, Ned follows Scarlett to the maze where she stabbed him a year earlier. When he regains consciousness the next morning, he finds he has a head wound and no memory of his showdown with Scarlett. She is reported missing and police constable Levi Canning (Richie Morris) finds traces of her blood in Ned's car. Eventually Scarlett is found and claims that Ned attacked her. Yashvi helps Ned clear his name and they expose Scarlett as a liar. Scarlett attempts to throw acid over him but injures herself instead and is returned to the psychiatric hospital.

Yashvi then moves to Sydney to join the rest of her family and she and Ned split up as a result. Ned then sleeps with Amy Greenwood (Jacinta Stapleton) who had previously had a fling with Shane. When Yashvi's mother and Shane's wife Dipi (Sharon Johal) finds out, Amy ends things with Ned despite having a crush on him and sleeps with Levi Canning (Richie Morris). When Amy can't decide who she wants to be with, Ned suggests a polyamorous relationship between the two of them and Levi. Eventually though, he tells Amy he wants her exclusively for himself and doesn't want to share her. When Amy's daughter Zara (Freya Van Dyke) comes to Erinsborough and discovers her mother in bed with Levi and Ned, Amy ends their relationship agreement in order to put Zara first.

After speaking to his cousin Roxy (Zima Anderson), who gives him some advice, Ned decides to move to Sydney to spend time with his mother Beth (Natalie Imbruglia). He reunites with Yashvi and they return the following month to attend Yashvi's Uncle Toadie's (Ryan Moloney) wedding to Melanie Pearson (Lucinda Cowden). Three years later, Ned returns when Paul announces plans for a new development called Robinson Towers in Melbourne for the residents of Ramsay Street to move into when plans are announced to demolish the street for a new road. Ned looks at a brochure for the development and Paul and Terese show him the site.

== Reception ==
The character received mostly positive attention from critics. Inside Soap's Sarah Ellis wrote, "There are certainly a lot of attractive men on Ramsay Street right now, but none of them have caught our attention in quite the same way as man of mystery Ned." Comparing the character to the show's Brennan brothers, Ellis said you knew what you were getting with them, whereas with Ned "we're not quite sure what's lurking beneath the surface". The Herald Sun's Clare Rigden questioned the character and his backstory, writing "I'm sorry, but a tattooist and ex-gang member who looks like a boy band member? I'm just not buying Ned Willis. Surely he's got to be a bit gnarlier than the clean-cut guy who waltzed into Erinsborough and into the Willis family? Is anyone else bothered by this, or is it just me? Tonight Ned's backstory might be unravelling, thanks to some digging by Paige."

Digital Spy's Daniel Kilkelly dubbed the kiss between Ned and Lauren as a "scandalous moment". Kilkelly later quipped, "Neighbours fans went Ned Willis crazy when he was first introduced to the show earlier this year, so it's not too much of a surprise that the producers have decided to quickly bring him back for another guest stint." Kilkelly also thought that there was plenty of storylines for the writers to explore. The Daily Express's Rebecca Miller had a similar observation, saying "Neighbours fans have been going wild ever since Ned Willis reappeared on screens in several episodes as a guest".

Carena Crawford of All About Soap thought Ned was "a troubled young man", while her colleague Claire Crick branded him "Ramsay Street Romeo Ned". Of the Ned and Elly pairing, TV Week columnist Erin Miller noted, "Looks like bold Elly has met her match in mysterious Ned." Kate Maccarthy of Radio Times wondered if they were "set to be the cutest new couple in Ramsay Street?" Simon Timblick from What's on TV found the character's looks aesthetically pleasing, dubbing him "hunky" and commenting "it was nice to see Ned regularly walking about, showing off his chest tattoo. But sadly all good things come to an end."
