= Alan Fletcher (actor) =

Australian actor (born 1957)

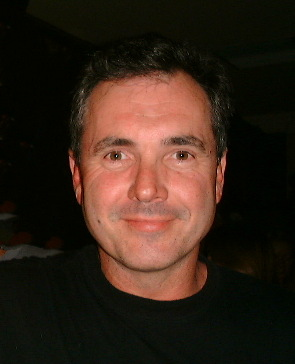
- Fletcher in 2001
- Born: 30 March 1957 (age 69); Perth, Western Australia, Australia
- Occupations: Actor, musician
- Years active: 1980–present
- Known for: Neighbours – Karl Kennedy; Cop Shop – Frank Rossi
- Spouse: Jennifer Hansen (m. 1990)
- Children: 2
- Website: http://www.alanfletcher.net

Alan Fletcher (born 30 March 1957) is an Australian actor of stage, television and film. He is also a singer and musician. He is perhaps best known for his television soap opera role in Neighbours as Dr. Karl Kennedy. He has also played Frank Rossi in Cop Shop and Michael Clayton in Embassy. In 2007, he was a contestant on the UK reality show Soapstar Superstar.

Having appeared in Neighbours from 1994 to 2025, Fletcher is the third longest serving actor in an Australian television serial, after Home and Away actors Ray Meagher and Lynne McGranger.

== Career ==
Fletcher was born in Perth, Western Australia, and attended Wesley College in Perth. Fletcher appeared in various stage productions in Perth, including No, No, Nanette, Privates on Parade and Something's Afoot. He was also asked to appear in the play Beyond a Joke alongside British actor Arthur Lowe. Fletcher met his then-fiancée actress Merrin Canning during a production of The Ghost Train. After continuing to work on the stage together in Perth, they moved to Sydney. Fletcher guested in The Young Doctors, before appearing in the second Australian episode of the US drama The Love Boat in 1981 as the on-screen fiancé of Morgan Fairchild. His first major television role was Constable Frank Rossi in the Seven Network police drama Cop Shop, which he began filming in May 1982.

Fletcher starred in the Australian feature film Fran alongside Noni Hazlehurst in 1985. The following year, he starred in the Seven Network miniseries Sword of Honour as Frank Vittorio, alongside Andrew Clarke, Tracy Mann and Nikki Coghill. In 1987, he appeared in the Australian soap opera Neighbours as Greg Cooper, a mechanic working in Jim Robinson's (Alan Dale) garage. He also appeared in the 1993 television film Mercy Mission.

In 1994, Fletcher joined the main cast of Neighbours as Karl Kennedy, a role which he continues to play. His on-screen wife Susan Kennedy is played by Jackie Woodburne, who previously played his sister in Cop Shop.

In 2005, Fletcher starred as Henry Higgins in a production of My Fair Lady at the Melbourne Comedy Theatre. He is also a prominent member of the Media, Entertainment and Arts Alliance, a role which saw him become a vocal critic of the 2004 US-Australia Free Trade Agreement, including an appearance on the political talk-show Meet the Press.

In 2008, Fletcher starred as Frank McGee in the workshop performance season of Call Girl the Musical and as Captain Hook in the Pantomime Peter Pan at His Majesty's Theatre, Aberdeen.

In 2011, Fletcher spent time in Old Melbourne Gaol to raise money for the charity Whitelion. In order to break out, Fletcher and fellow Neighbours cast members Stefan Dennis, Jordy Lucas and Valentina Novakovic had to each raise $1,000.

In May 2013, along with Saskia Hampele, he presented the award of Best Newcomer to Joseph Thompson at the British Soap Awards. Fletcher appeared in a documentary special celebrating Neighbours' 30th anniversary titled Neighbours 30th: The Stars Reunite, which aired in Australia and the UK in March 2015.

=== Musical career ===
Fletcher is also the lead singer in a band called Waiting Room, alongside Tommy Rando, Chris Hawker and Jeff Consi. The group has toured the United Kingdom several times. With a handful of their own songs they incorporate a selection of cover versions into their set, including Smokie's "Living Next Door to Alice", replacing 'Alice' with 'Susan', a reference to his Neighbours on-screen wife. Their single, "So Wrong", was released on iTunes on 26 November 2007, followed by their album, Live at the Elephant, on 17 December 2007.

On 30 November 2007, Fletcher performed a cover of the Oasis song "Wonderwall" for BBC Radio 1's Live Lounge.

In December 2008, Fletcher played a solo gig in Aberdeen, performing a mixture of covers and Waiting Room material. He followed this with a second gig in the city on 3 January 2009 at The Lemon Tree.

On 15 May 2009, Fletcher announced via his official website that he was to tour the UK with a new band, The X-Rays due to the economic situation of bringing Waiting Room with him. The tour took place in September and October 2009 and featured some original Waiting Room material. The X-Rays are UK-based musicians Johnny Lucas, Chris Hanby and Martin Stewart. Fletcher continued to perform each week in Melbourne with Waiting Room.

In September 2010, Fletcher announced on his official website that he would be touring the UK with Tommy Rando in November and December of that year. On 28 November 2010, during his UK tour, Fletcher appeared on The Xtra Factor to discuss the potential winners of the show.

In September 2012, Fletcher played a charity gig at the Shepherd's Bush branch of the pub chain Walkabout in aid of Blue September, a charity raising funds for cancer research.

Fletcher was a contestant on the UK TV show Soapstar Superstar, in January 2007 finishing in sixth place. He performed the following songs:

- Day 1: "Faith" (George Michael)
- Day 2: "Bridge Over Troubled Water" (Simon & Garfunkel)
- Day 3: "Tears in Heaven" (Eric Clapton)
- Day 4: "Can't Take My Eyes Off You" (Andy Williams)
- Day 5: "Don't Let the Sun Go Down on Me" (Elton John)

In 2013, Fletcher released a Christmas single, "If You Want A Happy Christmas", on which he collaborated with The Pacific Belles.

=== Photography and travel ===
In 2018, Fletcher combined his interests in travel and photography in a reality television program Photo Number 6. Fletcher explores the world with actor and director, Stig Wemyss, as they seek travel experiences that go beyond the tourist guidebook and delve into the heart and soul of the places. They look for photographic images that encapsulate emotion, geography and human connections.

== Personal life ==
Fletcher is married to Jennifer Hansen, a former newsreader for the Ten Network and they have two children.

Fletcher supports Essendon Football Club and Liverpool Football Club.

Fletcher is an ambassador for Blue September, a charity that raises awareness of all cancers that can affect men. In 2011, Fletcher helped launch the charity in Britain.

In 2022, following media reports about his health due to his sudden hair loss, Fletcher revealed that he had been diagnosed with alopecia areata. This condition was worked into the plot of Neighbours, where it was said that dodgy hair products caused Karl's hair to fall out.

Fletcher's grandfather was an organ builder in Liverpool with Rushworth's (Australian Organist Review Dec 1995).

== Filmography ==
=== Film ===
Year	Title	Role	Notes
1985	Fran	Jeff	
1986	Cool Change	Rob Mitchell	
1990	Return Home	Barry	
1990	What the Moon Saw	Mr Esposito	
1990	Beyond My Reach	Alex Gower	
1993	Gross Misconduct	Henry Landers	
2013	By a Loved One	Clown	Short film
2013	Off the Metre	Daniel Folkmover	Short film

=== Television ===
Year	Title	Role	Notes
1980	The Young Doctors	Patrick Hay	Guest
1981	The Love Boat	Martin Blake	Guest
1982–1984	Cop Shop	Frank Rossi	Main cast
1985	The Fast Lane	Collins	Episode: "Confusion by Numbers"
1985	A Thousand Skies	John Stannage	Miniseries
1986	Sword of Honour	Franky Vittiro	Miniseries
1987	Neighbours	Greg Cooper	Recurring role
1990	All the Rivers Run II	McLean	Miniseries
1990	Fast Forward	Himself	Guest performer
1990–1992	Embassy	Michael Clayton	Main cast
1991	The Flying Doctors	Austin Bennett	Episode: "Chasing Rainbows"
1992	Lift Off	Harry Stinson	Episodes: "A Load of Old Rubbish – Part 1" and "Destroy Part A"
1992	Bony	Prior	Episode: "Looks Can Kill"
1993	Time Trax	Mr Davenport	Episode: "To Kill A Billionaire"
1993	Snowy	Harry Jarvis	Episode: "Dams, Schemes & Damn Schemes"
1993	Flight from Hell	Franky	TV movie
1993	Mercy Mission	Frank	TV movie
1994	G.P.	Rick Cameron	Episode: "All of Me"
1994–2025	Neighbours	Karl Kennedy	Main cast
1996	Mercury	Snow Dockerty	Miniseries
2007	Soapstar Superstar	Contestant	
2009	Remembering Nigel	Self	
2013	Ant & Dec's Saturday Night Takeaway	Karl Kennedy	Guest
2014	Neighbours vs Zombies	Karl Kennedy	Webseries
2015–2017	Shakespeare Republic	Macbeth / Viola / Jaques	Guest
2015	Neighbours 30th: The Stars Reunite	Himself	Documentary
2016	Neighbours Summer Stories	Karl Kennedy	Webseries
2017	Neighbours vs Time Travel	Karl Kennedy	Webseries
2018	Photo Number 6	Himself	Reality TV series
2018–2019	Deano's Footy Show	Karl Kennedy	Guest
2022	Ainsley's World Cup Flavours	"Big Poppa Pump"	Guest
2024	Neighbours Does Hard Quiz	Self	
