= The Guns of Muschu =

2006 military novel by Don Dennis

- Author: Don Dennis
- Language: English
- Genre: Adventure, military
- Publisher: Allen & Unwin
- Publication date: 2006
- Publication place: Australia
- Pages: 264
- ISBN: 9781741148787

The Guns of Muschu is a 2006 novel by Australian author Don Dennis based on the diary of Sapper Mick Dennis, who was the sole survivor of Operation Copper, a daring raid on the Japanese occupied island of Muschu in 1945 which was carried out by members of the Z Special Unit during World War II.

Author Don Dennis was the nephew of Mick Dennis, the central character in the novel.

== Synopsis ==
During the night of 11 April 1945, eight Australian Z Special commandos landed on Japanese-held Muschu Island, off the coast of New Guinea. Their mission was to reconnoitre the island's defences and confirm the location of two concealed naval guns that commanded the approaches to Wewak Harbour.

But the secret mission goes horribly wrong. Unknown to them, their presence had been discovered within hours of their landing. With no means of escape, the island became a killing ground.

Nine days later, on the New Guinea mainland, the only survivor Mick Dennis staggered back through the Japanese lines to safety.

== Film adaptation ==
In April 2024, a film adaption of The Guns of Muschu was announced as being in development with a screenplay written by Tom Broadhurst and Jack Brislee, to be directed by Matthew Holmes.
