= Waiting Rooms (album) =

Studio album by Simon Warner
- Released: 1997
- Genre: Orchestral pop, chanson, Britpop
- Length: 53:51
- Label: Rough Trade Records
- Producer: Chris Groothuizen

Professional ratings
Review scores
Source	Rating
Allmusic	4.5/5 stars
NME	4/10

Waiting Rooms (1997) is the debut (and to date, only) album by English singer-songwriter Simon Warner.

In part a product of the fashion for orchestral pop in mid-1990s Britain, the album is strongly influenced by Anthony Newley and Jacques Brel. The album was produced by former House of Love bass guitarist Chris Groothuizen in collaboration with Warner and his keyboard player/co-arranger Richard Benbow.

Waiting Rooms produced two singles, 'Wake Up The Street' and 'The Wrong Girl' (the latter a vinyl-only release). Neither single was a hit.

== Track listing ==
Written by Simon Warner except 1, 5, 14 & 15 written by Simon Warner and Richard Benbow.

- Title 1 = "Introduction" Length = 0:24
- Title 2 = "Keep It Down" Length = 3:31
- Title 3 = "Decorating" Length = 4:33
- Title 4 = "Wake Up The Street" Length = 3:15
- Title 5 = "Jamboree" Length = 4:13
- Title 6 = "Moody" Length = 3:56
- Title 7 = "Doggy" Length = 3:46
- Title 8 = "The Wrong Girl" Length = 3:20
- Title 9 = "Hiding" Length = 3:55
- Title 10 = "Kitchen Tango" Length = 2:48
- Title 11 = "Mrs Zaniewski" Length = 1:42
- Title 12 = "Ticket Collector" Length = 2:51
- Title 13 = "Proper Job" Length = 5:00
- Title 14 = "Waiting Rooms" Length = 5:43
- Title 15 = "Simply Marvellous" Length = 2:25
- Title 16 = "Coda" Length = 2:09

== Personnel ==
- Simon Warner - vocals, guitar, arrangements
- Richard Benbow - keyboards, arrangements
- Kenny Rumbles - drums & percussion.
- James Watson - bass guitar
- (others)

== Further References ==
- "Pop: Pulp faction's rising star" by Ben Thompson, The Independent, September 19, 1997 (interview with Simon Warner)
- "Orchestral concept pop is redeemed by a musical philosopher." - review of Waiting Rooms by John O'Reilly, The Guardian, 1997
- Mojo Filter: Buried Treasure "Paradise Postponed" by Danny Ecclestone, MOJO Magazine #248, July 2014 (page 108)
- "The Erratic Career of a Torch Singer & Suburban Decadent" by Robert Cochrane, Culture Catch webzine, June 18, 2007
- "This Home is Haunted: A blather about Simon Warner's 'Waiting Rooms'" by Rarg, Universal Horse webzine, May 8, 2014
