= Waiting Room (band) =

Australian rock band

- Origin: Melbourne, Victoria, Australia
- Genres: Rock, alternative rock
- Years active: 2004–present
- Members: Alan Fletcher; Tommy Rando; Chris Hawker; Jeff Consi
- Website: www.waitingroomband.com

Waiting Room are an Australian rock band consisting of lead vocalist and actor Alan Fletcher, guitarist Chris Hawker, singer-songwriter Tommy Rando and drummer Jeff Consi. The band play at a public house called The Elephant and Wheelbarrow in Victoria, Australia. for Neighbours Night to meet fans. The band often tour the United Kingdom, where Fletcher is well-known because of his role in the Australian soap opera Neighbours.

They released their debut album In the Waiting Room in 2005. With Fletcher's link to Neighbours, several of their songs have been about Neighbours characters including "Sleeping Alongside Susan"; a cover of Smokie's "Living Next Door to Alice". The song refers to his character's relationship with Izzy Hoyland.

Fletcher toured the United Kingdom in September and October 2009 with the band The X-Rays.
