= List of Neighbours characters introduced in 2019 =

Neighbours is an Australian television soap opera. It was first broadcast on 18 March 1985. The following is a list of characters that appeared in the show in 2019, by order of first appearance. All characters are introduced by the shows executive producer Jason Herbison. Raymond Renshaw and Ivan Renshaw were introduced during the second week of January, followed by Vera Punt and Melissa Lohan. Claudia Watkins began appearing from March, with Roxy Willis arriving in April. Dean Mahoney and Vance Abernethy made their first appearances in May. June saw the introduction of Ebony Buttrose. Harlow Robinson made her debut in July, while Mackenzie Hargreaves began appearing from August. Scarlett Brady and Hendrix Greyson arrived in September, along with Prudence Wallace and Graham Isheev. Mackenzie's father Grant Hargreaves was introduced in October. Kane Jones made his first appearance during the following month.

== Raymond and Ivan Renshaw ==
Raymond and Ivan Renshaw
- Neighbours character
- Portrayed by: Frank Magree (Raymond); Michael Shanahan (Ivan)
- First appearance: 11 January 2019
- Last appearance: 14 January 2019 (Ivan); 15 January 2019 (Raymond)
- Introduced by: Jason Herbison
In-universe information
- Daughters: Delaney Renshaw (Raymond)

Raymond Renshaw, played by Frank Magree, and Ivan Renshaw, played by Michael Shanahan, made their first appearances on 11 January 2019. The Renshaws are a Sydney crime family. They have been mentioned several times since the arrival of Leo Tanaka (Tim Kano) in 2016, who reported Ivan and Raymond's money laundering to the police. Raymond's daughter Delaney Renshaw (Ella Newton) was introduced in December 2018. Conor McMullan of Digital Spy commented, "We tipped Neighbours' Renshaw family storyline as one of the loose ends that the show needed to tie up earlier this year, and as 2018 draws to a close, they may be doing just that."

In late December, it was confirmed that Ivan and Raymond would be central to "a shock siege" storyline, as they come to Erinsborough to get revenge on Leo for his part in sending them to prison. Ivan tracks Leo down at The Waterhole and shoots at him, but Terese Willis (Rebekah Elmaloglou) takes the bullet instead. In the aftermath, Raymond is ushered into Harold Cafe as he tries to leave the complex, and he holds everyone hostage at gunpoint. During his piece about Neighbours channelling the work of filmmaker David Lynch, John Allison of The Guardian wrote about Raymond: "Let's not put too fine a point on this: he was dressed like Evil Cooper from Twin Peaks: The Return. That leather jacket! The hair! Even the shoes! Within 10 minutes of his appearance, he had ordered the execution of Robinson scion Leo Tanaka. And, to underscore the point, every evil pronouncement was accompanied by an atonal orchestral sting straight out of Twin Peaks' notorious atomic bomb sequence."

When Delaney Renshaw returns to her hotel room, she finds Raymond and Ivan waiting for her, following their release from prison. Ivan leaves the room while Raymond talks with Delaney and learns that she came to Erinsborough to see Leo Tanaka, as she fell in love with him while he was working at Raymond's club in Sydney. She then tells him that Leo was the one who went to the police about his money laundering, not Mannix. Raymond and Ivan decide to shoot Leo, and Raymond tells Ivan to get Leo alone so there are no witnesses. Ivan finds Leo in The Waterhole and fires the gun, but Terese Willis jumps in front of Leo taking the bullet. Ivan flees the scene and calls Raymond to tell him what happened. Raymond leaves Delaney and comes down to the complex, where he spots Leo and the police. He enters Harold's Café and the customers assume he is just a hotel guest. Mark Brennan (Scott McGregor) and Ned Willis (Ben Hall) find Ivan on Power Road trying to break into a car. Mark confronts him and Ned tackles him to the ground.

Raymond tries to leave the café, but Elly Conway (Jodi Anasta) tells him to stay put as the police are continuing to sweep the area for Ivan's partner. She later tells him that he can go, but he notices that she does not tell anyone else and realises that she knows the police are looking for him. He pulls out his gun and orders Elly to collect all the phones, Yashvi Rebecchi (Olivia Junkeer) to lock the door and Chloe Brennan (April Rose Pengilly) to barricade it. He then hears Kirsha Rebecchi (Vani Dhir) on the phone to the police. He orders everyone to get on the ground, and asks the police to get him a van. Elly convinces him that he cannot take all the hostages with him, and he eventually lets an older couple and the children go. She tells him to just take her with him, but Chloe argues that he should take her instead. Raymond fires the gun at the ceiling and tells them to shut up. Leo comes to the café and Raymond lets him inside, where he confronts his role in sending him and Ivan to prison. Leo asks him to think about Delaney, but Raymond refuses to listen and raises his gun to shoot just as the police come inside and tackle him to the ground. Raymond is arrested and is later shown handcuffed in the police station.

== Vera Punt ==
Vera Punt
- Neighbours character
- Portrayed by: Sally-Anne Upton
- Duration: 2019, 2021–2022, 2024–2025
- First appearance: 23 January 2019
- Last appearance: 11 December 2025
- Introduced by: Jason Herbison
In-universe information
- Sisters: Valerie Grundy
- Aunts: Gertrude
- Nephews: Curtis Perkins

Vera Punt played by Sally-Anne Upton, made her first appearance on 23 January 2019. Upton's management confirmed her casting in the recurring guest role on 14 January 2019. Vera is the sister of Valerie Grundy (Patti Newton), who dies during the previous month. Daniel Kilkelly from Digital Spy reported that Vera arrives on Ramsay Street to retrieve her sister's dog Regina Grundy (Timba). He added that Vera takes Regina and this causes an argument with her new owners David Tanaka (Takaya Honda) and Aaron Brennan (Matt Wilson), who threaten legal action.

Of her character, Upton commented, "She just says it how it is. Shows like Neighbours need characters like Mrs Punt who have got a bit of an edge and unpredictability about them." Upton thought Vera would get along with her Wentworth character Juicy Lucy, saying they both "Aussie Larrikin" types. Joanne Hawkins of realestate.com.au said Vera has been described as being "so despicable, you can't help but love her." Laura Masia of TV Week called her "the town whinger". Ahead of her guest stint in early 2021, Upton worked as the show's COVID-19 nurse and she called it "one of the most important roles of my life". She was also grateful that the producers wrote new storylines for her character as a thank you. Vera appears in the final episode of Neighbours and Upton said of filming the finale, "It feels wonderful to be back on Ramsay Street. Sad at the same time, but it's part of history finishing and I'm just glad to be a part of it." Vera debuted in the show's opening titles in April 2025.

Aaron Brennan and David Tanaka spot Vera with Regina in Ramsay Street and ask her where she found their dog, but Vera tells them that Regina belongs to her. David and Aaron explain that they have been looking after Regina since Vera's sister died. When she refuses to give the dog back, David calls her a dognapper. Aaron later talks with Vera about how he and David have fallen in love with Regina, and he offers to buy her. Vera tells him that Regina was bequeathed to her, and if he wants Regina then they will have to go through a judge. David and Aaron eventually decide to let Regina go with Vera, who presents them with a vets bill before leaving for Bendigo. Vera later meets with Melissa Lohan (Jacqui Purvis) about selling Valerie's house. She then walks through the Lassiter's complex where Leo Tanaka (Tim Kano) is vandalising a Valentine's Day display. He throws a large floral display which hits Vera and knocks her to the ground. Leo's family see that she is okay and ask her not to call the police. Sheila Canning (Colette Mann) talks with Vera and asks her not to sue Leo. She mentions that his father Paul Robinson (Stefan Dennis) is actually the one with the money, and implies the accident could have happened to anyone with all the decorations hanging up, so Vera sues Lassiters. Vera comes to Lassiters to hear a public apology from Leo, but he gets into an argument with Paul and Terese Willis (Rebekah Elmaloglou), causing Vera to leave.

Vera later expresses her disgust when Roxy Willis (Zima Anderson) strips off while she rides a mechanical bull on grounds of the Lassiters complex. Vera attends a charity bachelor auction at The Waterhole and buys Aaron for $275. Just over a year later, she watches a live stream of David performing at a lip-sync contest. She then interrupts a conversation between the Rebecchis to let them know they are missing a great performance from David and Mackenzie Hargreaves (Georgie Stone). While walking through the Lassiters Complex, Vera trips over some Easter decorations, injuring her ankle. David and Terese send her to Erinsborough Hospital, where she refuses to be treated by Karl Kennedy (Alan Fletcher), who was recently accused of assault, so David takes over. Vera's nephew Curtis Perkins (Nathan Borg) later comes to visit her. As Karl is watering his front yard, he notices dog faeces on his grass and accuses Vera of allowing Regina to defecate on his lawn, before accidentally spraying her with his hose. Vera is enraged and storms off. Karl later finds a pile of manure on his lawn and accuses Vera of putting it there in retaliation for getting sprayed. Karl collects all of the manure in a wheelbarrow and goes over to Vera's house, where she is mowing her grass. Vera denies his accusations and in an attempt to stop him from dumping the manure on the grass, Vera grabs some and throws it at Karl, but hits Paul instead. Paul and Karl team up and order a truckload of manure to be dumped on Vera's front yard. As the truck is about to pour the manure over, Melanie Pearson (Lucinda Cowden) reveals that she was responsible for the first lot of manure, after initially sending it to Angela Lane (Amanda Harrison), who then dumped it on Karl's lawn.

Vera attends Melanie's Christmas party psychic booth and asks her to speak with Valerie. Vera later expresses that she is a victim of a contagious itch that has been spreading through the community. At Leo's winery ladies' lunch, Vera tells Jane Harris (Annie Jones) she would not live long enough to store wine barrels for twenty years. Jane's daughter, Nicolette Stone (Charlotte Chimes), says that she would be surprised and disappointed if Vera had twenty years left, then Vera scares off Melanie by saying she has aging bones. Vera talks about Terese's alcoholism relapse and Harlow Robinson (Jemma Donovan) says that Vera's opinion does not matter. Vera begins criticising everyone at the table, so Nicolette throws a glass of water over her face. Vera then declares she is never setting foot into the winery again. Vera attends a Ramsay Street party with her nephew a months later, where Vera speaks with her neighbours and befriends Angie Rebecchi (Lesley Baker).

Several years later, Vera goes on a date to the Waterhole with Santo Oliveira (David Serafin), where they are seen by Terese Willis, who was under the impression that Santo was cheating on Melanie Pearson with Vera after Melanie told her that she and Santo were in a relationship, which turned out to be a lie. Vera then competes in the Lassiters Longest Lie-In event, but is soon disqualified after stepping out of her bed, having been sabotaged with itching powder. Vera refuses to drink Yorokobi alcohol after Wendy Rodwell (Candice Leask) tries to serve it to her, due to the recent random poisoning of one of its bottles. She later buys number 32 Ramsay Street form Leo after he is forced to sell it for financial stability. House tenants Mackenzie and Haz Devkar (Shiv Palekar) come home to find Vera swimming in their pool. She tells them that she is happy to keep them on as tenants, but she plans to put a gate between her house and the pool for regular access, and threatens them with a rent increase after they refuse. After the hot water system breaks, Vera refuses to pay for its repair, and tries to get Haz and Mackenzie to pay for it. To get her to cooperate, they allowed her to continue to use the pool once a fortnight. Vera expected an invite to Haz and Mackenzie's wedding, and Byron Stone (Xavier Molyneux) tells her the wrong dates. He immediately feels guilty after Vera prepares to head to the wedding.

Haz and Mackenzie move to Paris, and she offers Byron and Krista Sinclair (Majella Davis) help with finding new tenants. Byron's sister Nicolette move in, and Vera demands she is immediately added to the lease. She secretly hires Rhett Norman (Liam Maguire) to sell her house. Vera is invited to the share house Halloween party, where she tells the share house residents that she is moving in. They initially say no, but after she reveals that she has a gambling addiction and has no money, Byron allows her to temporarily move in. She selects Max Ramsay (Ben Jackson) as their new housemate after Krista moves out, which annoys Byron. Vera begins to take advantage of her housemate's kindness, getting a free spa treatment form Sadie Rodwell (Emerald Chan) and free car service form Max. She later decides to move out of number 32 and begins looking for share houses with tenants her own age. Byron, Max and Sadie help by getting her ready, but she is declined by multiple. Sadie suggests she move into Eirene Rising, the local retirement complex, and she is deeply offended. She later organizes Vera to get her hair done by Eirene Rising resident Gino Esposito (Shane McNamara), hoping to change her mind. Byron later accidentally tells Vera Sadie's plan, and she says she won't move in to the complex.

Vera later changes her mind and agrees to go for a tour of the complex, and later signs the papers to move in. Byron and Sadie help her move her stuff, and she meets residents Hilary Robinson (Anne Scott-Pendlebury) and Moira Tohu (Robyn Arthur), and annoys them with her gossip. Vera sees Roxy filling in as manager for Susan Kennedy (Jackie Woodburne), and questions her intentions. She demands Terese hire a new aqua aerobic instructor. Vera and Curtis later attend a nude magician show at the Waterhole, which she greatly enjoys. She later begins to experience stomach pains, and Karl tells her to take indigestion medication. Darcy Tyler (Mark Raffety) becomes suspicious and thinks she has appendicitis, however Vera won't accept his advice after Gino reveals his dodgy past. She eventually agrees to let him take her to hospital, where she gets her appendix removed.

In 2022, Alice Penwill from Inside Soap wrote that Vera "certainly isn't the most popular resident on the street".

== Melissa Lohan ==
Melissa Lohan
- Neighbours character
- Portrayed by: Jacqui Purvis
- First appearance: 25 January 2019
- Last appearance: 4 March 2019
- Introduced by: Jason Herbison
In-universe information
- Occupation: Real estate agent

Melissa "Mel" Lohan, played by Jacqui Purvis, made her first appearance on 25 January 2019. Mel is Chloe Brennan's (April Rose Pengilly) former girlfriend, who producers introduced as part of an on-going exploration of Chloe's background, bisexuality, and unrequited love story with Elly Conway (Jodi Anasta). The former couple had a bad break up, with Pengilly explaining "When Mel left Chloe initially it was really vindictive and vengeful and she left her in a dangerous situation." Mel was branded a "villain", "ruthless" and "sinister" by Charlie Milward of the Daily Express, after he observed her efforts to secure a job with the Robinson Pines development. Milward also said that Paul Robinson (Stefan Dennis) could be in danger, as Mel begins to "stir up trouble". While bemoaning the show's tendency to have a "guest villain of the week", Conor McMullan of Digital Spy thought Mel could have been "a great recurring character, or better yet a regular, but her unfortunate decision to commit arson might just get in the way of that." McMullan also praised Purvis, saying she played Mel "brilliantly". The character departed on 4 March.

Mel comes to Erinsborough to visit her former girlfriend Chloe Brennan, after receiving an invitation from Chloe's brother Aaron Brennan (Matt Wilson). She initially watches Chloe, Aaron and Elly Conway decorating the local pub, The Waterhole, and approaches Elly to comment that she and Chloe look like they are more than friends, but Elly tells her she is engaged to Chloe's brother. Mel comes to Ramsay Street to see Chloe, who shuts the door on her and refuses to talk to her. Mel tells Aaron that she is remorseful for stealing from Chloe and leaving her in debt, so he arranges for them to talk. Mel apologises to Chloe for leaving her and tells her she will pay her back. Chloe and Mel agree to be friends again. Mel reads about the Robinson Pines housing development and introduces herself to Paul Robinson in the hope of securing a job as a sales agent, but Paul turns her down as his daughter Amy Williams (Zoe Cramond) has a team in place. Mel later comes by to see Chloe, who is about to send out an email invitation to the Robinson Pines sale, and she manages changes the time while Chloe is out of the room. The following day, Mel comes by the sale and helps Amy and Paul out by talking to potential investors, leading Paul to offer her a job as sales manager. Chloe kisses Mel and they spend the night together. Mel soon learns that Chloe is in love with Elly, but agrees to keep it to herself. She also convinces Paul to extend Robinson Pines and she meets with Lucas Fitzgerald (Scott Major) to discuss selling his garage.

During an outing to the beach, Chloe tells Mel that she has been diagnosed with Huntington's disease. Mel's supportive response leads Chloe to give their relationship a second chance. Mel purchases an office in the Lassiters complex, and pays Heath Kabel (Tim Conlon) to turn away business at the garage. When he tells her that the apprentice Bea Nilsson (Bonnie Anderson) is rebooking the cancelled job, she asks for his keys and starts a fire at the garage with a faulty power board, unaware that Bea is sleeping inside a van. Bea accuses Mel of starting the fire, after seeing her giving money to Heath. Lucas later agrees to sell the garage, along with other Power Road business owners. Chloe also accuses Mel of starting the fire, after learning that she threw out a faulty power board from Number 24. Mel denies everything, but Chloe tells her that she no longer trusts her and ends their relationship. Mel replies that no one will want Chloe when she becomes sick and leaves. Elly confronts Mel the following day for almost killing her sister, but Mel accuses her of undermining her relationship with Chloe, and threatens to tell Mark about the kiss. Elly says that if Mel loves Chloe, she will keep it to herself and leave, which she does. Mel is later found and arrested in South Australia, after Heath makes a deal with the police.

== Claudia Watkins ==
Claudia Watkins
- Neighbours character
- Portrayed by: Kate Raison
- Duration: 2019–2020
- First appearance: 29 March 2019
- Last appearance: 18 May 2020
- Introduced by: Jason Herbison
In-universe information
- Husband: Trent Kelly (backstory); Errol Watkins (backstory)
- Sons: Finn Kelly; Shaun Watkins
- Granddaughters: Aster Conway

Claudia Watkins, played by Kate Raison, made her first appearance on 29 March 2019. The character was introduced as the estranged mother of Finn Kelly (Rob Mills). During another guest appearance in December, Claire Crick of What's on TV called the character a "trouble-making mum". Raison reprised the role again in April 2020, following Finn's exit. Claudia's arrival in Erinsborough also facilitated the return of former recurring character Samantha Fitzgerald (Simone Buchanan). Johnathon Hughes of the Radio Times branded the character a "tough cookie", "calculating" and "menacing". He observed that due to Elly Conway's (Jodi Anasta) history with Claudia's sons "there's not much love lost between the ladies". Anasta agreed with the assessment and she told him "From the moment Claudia arrives, Elly is the only one fully on her guard. She tells the rest of the Kennedys she only ever visits when she wants something. From what she knows of the family's backstory, Shaun was the good side – Finn and Claudia are definitely the bad!" Anasta admitted that she was a fan of Raison from her time in E Street and A Country Practice. She commented, "We've worked together quite a bit as Elly and Claudia over the last year, lots of intense two-hander scenes. I've learnt a lot from her, she's just beautiful."

After she is contacted by her son Finn Kelly's doctor Karl Kennedy (Alan Fletcher), Claudia comes to Erinsborough. Karl offers to take Claudia to see Finn, who has recently woken from a coma and has amnesia, but she tells him she is only in town to collect her younger son, Shaun Watkins (Brad Moller). Claudia admits that she had little to do with Finn when he was growing up, and calls him a psychopath. Shaun convinces his mother to stay and see Finn, by threatening to stay in town. Upon seeing Finn waiting for her, Claudia changes her mind and runs off. She meets Susan Kennedy (Jackie Woodburne) and asks her what her agenda towards Finn is. She then tells Susan that she is absolved for pushing Finn off the cliff, but Susan wants to discuss Finn's childhood. Claudia explains how his stepfather, Errol thought he was evil. Claudia visits Finn and asks that he severs ties with Shaun and his lawyer, before he drags them down with him. Claudia attempts to offer Susan compensation money, but Susan rejects it and gives Claudia a photo album and a letter from Finn that he wrote while he was being held hostage in Columbia, which prompts Claudia to visit Finn once more. She asks about his lawyer's skills and then tells him that she has kept a photo. Claudia says goodbye to Shaun and tells him to get Finn's lawyer to send the bills to her.

At the end of the year, Claudia visits Finn and Elly Conway, who is carrying Shaun's child, wanting to make amends following Shaun's death in an avalanche. Finn discovers that she paid both Dean Mahoney (Henry Strand) and a private investigator to dig up dirt on Elly's past. Claudia asks him to watch Elly and report back to her, but Finn refuses. She then reveals that she was behind the fire that destroyed the evidence in his case. Recognising that Finn has feelings for Elly, she informs his girlfriend and Elly's sister Bea Nilsson (Bonnie Anderson). Following Finn's death, Claudia returns to Erinsborough and meets her granddaughter Aster Conway (Isla Goulas; Scout Bowman) and begins scheming to get custody, knowing that Elly has been charged with voluntary manslaughter. She hires Samantha Fitzgerald as her lawyer, later finding out that Sam has history with the Kennedys, and begins trying to discredit the family. Claudia and Samantha assist Angela Lane (Amanda Harrison), and other members of Erinsborough High's PTA, when they call for Susan's resignation to compile more stress on her. Claudia blackmails Elly's judge into giving her a custodial sentence, but she is blindsided by Elly's decision to take Aster into the prison with her. She pays Andrea Somers (Madeleine West) to start a prison riot, so Elly will change her mind about keeping Aster with her. Claudia witnesses Susan lashing out at one of her students Mackenzie Hargreaves (Georgie Stone) and she confronts Susan, declaring that she wants custody of Aster. Claudia sets down roots in Erinsborough, buying the penthouse and attempting to buy Chloe Brennan's (April Rose Pengilly) island, where Finn committed a series of crimes. She gathers evidence about Susan's mental instability and claims the Kennedys and Bea cannot look after Aster as well as she could, which convinces the judge to give her temporary custody of Aster.

After much consideration, Chloe and her husband Pierce Greyson (Tim Robards) decide to sell the island to Claudia, but then Chloe chooses to keep a close eye on Claudia, realising that her bid for custody of Aster was a scheme. Claudia enlists the help of other Ramsay Street teens Hendrix Greyson (Benny Turland), Harlow Robinson (Jemma Donovan) and Mackenzie to assist her in setting up the camp. Chloe and her brother Aaron Brennan (Matt Wilson) overhear Claudia speaking to a police officer and discover that she was responsible for the fire that destroyed the evidence in Finn's case. When Aaron confronts Claudia, she offers him assistance in his goal to become a foster parent in exchange for his silence. Aaron rejects this but pretends to accept so that Chloe, Susan and Bea can search the penthouse for evidence of her bribing the officer. When she returns, Claudia discovers that they are trying to find evidence against her, and decides to flee the country on her private jet, which was carrying the rest of her household goods from Geneva. Upon reaching the airport, she discovers that Shaun was rescued a few days before and flew on the jet after finding out she was in Melbourne. He tells Claudia that he survived in a hut with a sprained ankle on limited rations for six months and then demands to know why Aster is with her, forcing her to confess. As Bea and Susan arrive, Shaun convinces her to confess her crimes to the police. Although she initially refuses, Claudia decides to do so after Samantha rejects her for not leaving the country. Shaun then tells Claudia he will never forgive her. Elly later visits Claudia before she is remanded and Claudia reiterates her belief that Elly killed Finn and is not a proper parent for Aster. Furious, Elly tells Claudia that she will never see Aster again and Claudia is charged.

== Roxy Willis ==
Roxy Willis, played by Zima Anderson, made her first appearance on 29 April 2019. The character and Anderson's casting details were announced on 14 April 2019. Anderson had wanted to secure a role on Neighbours since she moved to Melbourne, where it is filmed, two years prior. Of joining the cast, Anderson stated "I've been so lucky with the role of Roxy, I've already found myself in a wide range of crazy situations from virtually the first scene which has been so much fun and really challenged me, I'm constantly learning." Roxy is introduced as "a wild girl from the Northern Territory" and the niece of regular character Terese Willis (Rebekah Elmaloglou), although Anderson pointed out that she is not actually related to Terese by blood. She is the daughter of Adam Willis (Ian Williams) and Gemma Ramsay (Beth Buchanan). Gemma hopes Terese can sort out Roxy's rebellious ways using her own experiences. Anderson described Roxy as being "very fun and very naughty". She is also "full of heart", "bubbly", "sporadic and does whatever she wants." Roxy's older boyfriend Vance Abernethy (Conrad Coleby) was also introduced shortly after her arrival.

== Dean Mahoney ==
Dean Mahoney
- Neighbours character
- Portrayed by: Henry Strand
- First appearance: 2 May 2019
- Last appearance: 6 December 2019
- Introduced by: Jason Herbison
In-universe information
- Occupation: Student
- Father: Reece Mahoney
- Mother: Dora Dietrich

Dean Mahoney, played by Henry Strand, made his first appearance on 2 May 2019. The character and Strand's casting were announced in the June 2019 edition of Soap World. Dean is introduced as the son of Dr Dora Dietrich (Kirsty Hillhouse) and billed as a "disobedient student". Their reporter stated that Dean is a pupil at Erinsborough High and he clashes with his pregnant teacher Elly Conway (Jodi Anasta). Elly disciplines Dean which prompts him to concoct a revenge plan. He reveals that he is Dora's son and knowing that Elly is a patient of Dora's, he accesses Elly's medical records and discovers that she has lied about her pregnancy. Dean tells Elly that he will not reveal the truth as long as she does as he asks. The reporter added that Dean would force Elly to break the law and subsequently attract a second blackmailer. The character returned on 5 December, as he stalks Elly and admits responsibility for her losing her job.

After Dean is given a detention by his teacher Elly Conway, he tries to argue his way out of it and Yashvi Rebecchi (Olivia Junkeer) tells him to give Elly a break. Elly notices Dean has not completed an assignment, and when he calls her a drainer, she increases his one detention to a weeks worth. When Dean goes to Erinsborough Hospital to meet his mother Dr Dietrich for lunch, he learns that Elly is her patient and looks at her file. Back at school, Dean reveals to Elly that he knows she is lying to her husband about her baby and wants a high grade on the assignment he has not done. Elly warns him that what he has done is illegal, and threatens to report him. Dean notices Elly and her husband having breakfast and makes a point of coming over and bringing up the subject of their baby. He later receives a B grade for his assignment, which makes Yashvi suspicious. When she confronts Dean, he pours a drink over her head and Elly gives him another week of detention. Dean then blackmails Elly into buying him alcohol for outdoor education camp, but he does not get anything, after Elly is caught and later hospitalised. Dean then steals a picture of her ultrasound scan to continue his blackmail, drawing Finn Kelly's (Rob Mills) attention. Finn pays Dean to transfer to another school.

A few months later, Dean follows Elly through the Lassiters Complex. Finn later catches him stalking Elly and confronts him, but they are interrupted by Toadfish Rebecchi (Ryan Moloney), giving Dean the opportunity to flee. Elly later meets Dean in the complex and he explains that he heard she was fired from Erinsborough High, before asking if it was because of him. Elly tells him it happened recently, but Dean wonders if he was part of the reason. He apologises for scaring her and for what happened between them. When Elly asks why now, Dean tells her that he dropped out of school, struggled to find work and has been couch-surfing, which made him realise how awful he was to her when she was going through a bad time. He adds that he will not bother her anymore. Hours later, he meets with Finn's mother Claudia Watkins (Kate Raison), whose private investigator paid him for information on Elly's past.

== Vance Abernethy ==
Vance Abernethy
- Neighbours character
- Portrayed by: Conrad Coleby
- First appearance: 16 May 2019
- Last appearance: 6 August 2019
- Introduced by: Jason Herbison
In-universe information
- First cousins: Carly Abernethy

Vance Abernethy, played by Conrad Coleby, made his first appearance on 16 May 2019. The character and Coleby's casting was announced on 18 April 2019. Of his joining the cast, Coleby said "It's been amazing! They're a great bunch of people who are so lovely to work with. Rebekah Elmaloglou [Terese] and I get along really well – I'm having such a good time!" Chris Edwards of Digital Spy reported that Vance "is set to stir things up from the moment he sets foot onto Ramsay Street." Vance is the older boyfriend of Roxy Willis (Zima Anderson), and a former boyfriend of Terese Willis (Elmaloglou), who "led her down a wild path back in the day." Coleby explained that Vance and Roxy's relationship is "spicy" and "affectionate". They share "a deep connection, and a very fun one." Vance is aware of how Terese and Roxy are related, and he enjoys the memories of his relationship with Terese, but he think she is living a lie. Coleby added that Vance would get under her skin and clash with her partner Paul Robinson (Stefan Dennis).

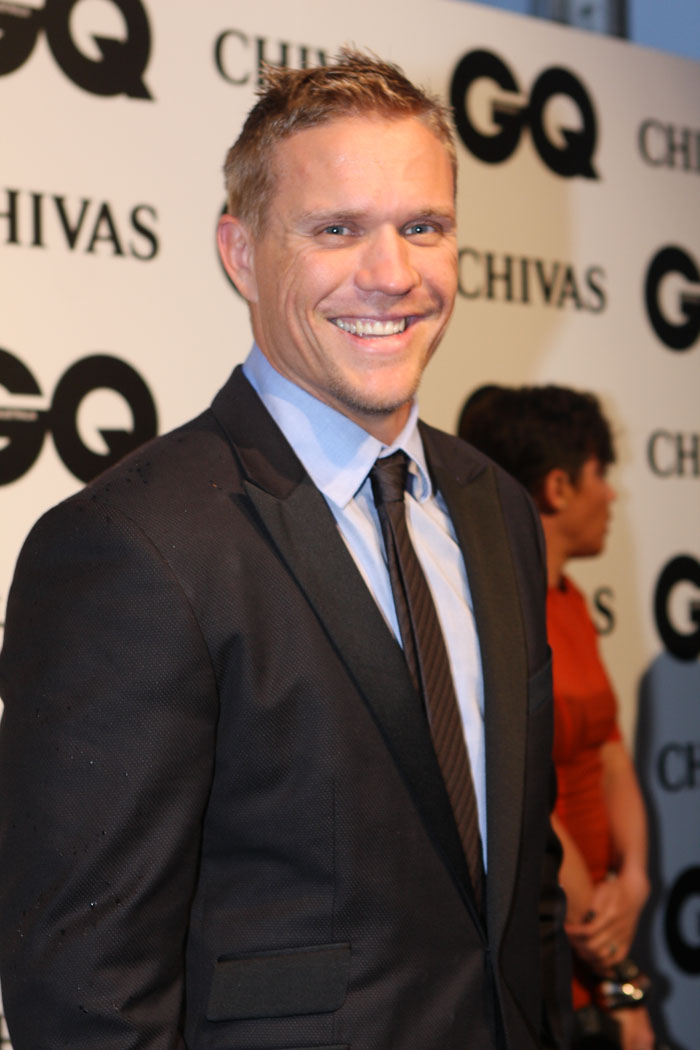
Conrad Coleby made his debut as Vance in May.

Vance comes to Erinsborough to meet up with his girlfriend Roxy Willis, who reveals to Leo Tanaka (Tim Kano) that her share of the money used to purchase half of the Back Lane Bar came from Vance, making him Leo's new partner. To get Leo on side, Vance puts a stop to Roxy's plan to give the bar an outback theme. Vance later comes face to face with his former girlfriend Terese, after Roxy takes him home to meet her aunt. He is also reacquainted with Ned Willis (Ben Hall), who introduced him and Roxy. Terese realises that Roxy does not know that they dated, and Vance says he does not want to ruin Roxy's fresh start. He assures Terese that he loves Roxy. Terese also decides to keep their connection a secret from Roxy and her partner Paul Robinson. Vance takes delivery of a race horse that he and Roxy are selling to fund their life together, however, their buyer pulls out of the deal. Leo realises that the horse is stolen and that Roxy does not know. Vance attempts to find a new buyer for the horse, but Roxy sells it to Paul for a low price. Ned also learns that the horse is stolen and tells Terese, who gives Vance a week to break up with Roxy and leave town. She then convinces Paul to cancel the sale. Vance finds another buyer for the horse and tells Leo that he is leaving town without Roxy. While saying goodbye to Terese outside Lassiters Hotel, Vance tells her she will always be his first love and they share a hug.

When Terese learns Vance has sold the horse to Pierce Greyson (Tim Robards), she goes to the stables and threatens to call the police if he does not cancel the sale. Vance knows she is bluffing as she cares for him still. Instead Paul calls the police upon learning from Leo that Vance stole money from the bar. Terese tells Vance to run, and refuses to leave with him when he asks. Weeks later, Vance returns to town after learning of a kiss between Roxy and Paul, who he attacks. Roxy insists that she made advances towards Paul out of revenge. Gary Canning (Damien Richardson) is blamed for the attack on Paul, but Roxy feels increasingly guilty about letting an innocent man take the fall for Vance's crime. She asks him to confess if he really loves her, and Vance finds the police waiting for him as he attempts to leave the backpackers' hostel.

== Ebony Buttrose ==
Ebony Buttrose
- Neighbours character
- Portrayed by: Christie Hayes
- First appearance: 7 June 2019
- Last appearance: 11 July 2019
- Introduced by: Jason Herbison
In-universe information
- Sisters: Crystal Buttrose

Ebony Buttrose, played by Christie Hayes, made her first appearance on 7 June 2019. Hayes's casting was announced on 24 March 2019. Of joining the cast, the actress stated,"I am so lucky to join the cast of Neighbours, it's a dream come true. Literally a dream I had a while back I was working on the series and now I am! I was beyond excited and cried when I found out I had the role because I love acting. It is the best professional experience I have had in television and I love waking up every day to play my character." Hayes's character will become involved in a "complex" love triangle, and it was later confirmed she is Pierce Greyson's (Tim Robards) fiancée. A reporter for Inside Soap wrote that Pierce's former girlfriend Chloe Brennan (April Rose Pengilly) would be suspicious of Ebony and learns she has lots of secrets. Hayes said Ebony had "a lot of layers to her."

Ebony comes to the Back Lane Bar to meet her fiancé Pierce Greyson, and walks in on him being kissed by Chloe Brennan. She asks what is going on and Pierce tells her it is a misunderstanding. The following day, while having breakfast in The Waterhole, Ebony spots Chloe and invites her over for a coffee, where she tells Chloe about how she met Pierce at a charity gala. Ebony convinces Pierce to buy them a house while they are staying in Melbourne. Terese lets Ebony have Chloe as her personal concierge, as she sets up an office for her perfume business. Ebony makes Chloe move a chair around the room several times, before warning her that she will not be getting Pierce back and not to make an enemy of her. Chloe tells Ebony that she is concerned about Pierce bankrolling her perfume line and Ebony thinks she is calling her a golddigger. Pierce asks Ebony about Chloe, knowing that things will be awkward between them, but she says that if he gives them some space she will befriend Chloe. Pierce and Ebony buy a house together, but she tries to keep him away from it, telling him that it needs to be decorated.

Chloe learns that Ebony's crystal perfume bottles are actually made of glass, and finds records of bank transfers from Ebony to a private account. Ebony admits that she is taking some of the money she gets from Pierce and giving it to her sister, Crystal Buttrose (Rachel Soding), who is a single mother and staying at the new house. Ebony also reveals that she has not told Pierce about her sister. Chloe helps to find Crystal a place to live, and after Pierce catches her at the house, she asks Ebony to talk to him, but Ebony wants to wait until after the wedding. However, she eventually tells Pierce about Crystal and the money. She explains that she initially saw him as a way to a better life, but she fell in love with him and was scared of losing him if he knew about her family situation. Pierce asks Ebony to sign an agreement in which she agrees to commit to their marriage, without profiting from it, or he will give her $250,000 to walk away. Ebony signs the agreement, but her feelings of insecurity over Chloe and Pierce's friendship emerge. She asks Chloe if she is in love with Pierce, but Chloe assures her that she does not have to worry. Ebony later witnesses Pierce and Chloe hugging, and she decides to take the cheque Pierce offered her and leaves town.

== Harlow Robinson ==
Harlow Robinson, played by Jemma Donovan, made her first appearance on 15 July 2019. The character and Donovan's casting details were announced on 26 March 2019 via the show's social media. She commented, "I am so happy and very honoured to be a part of a series which has been enjoyed by generations." Donovan's father Jason Donovan played Harlow's great-uncle Scott Robinson, while her grandfather Terence Donovan played Doug Willis. Executive producer Jason Herbison stated that Donovan did "a fantastic audition" and her family connection was "an unexpected surprise". The role of Harlow was written for Donovan, and the character's storyline is similar to her own story of moving to Australia from the UK. Harlow is a member of the show's Robinson family, who were introduced in the first episode in 1985. Simon Timblick of the Radio Times said that Harlow's place within the family would be revealed in the coming months. Shortly before her arrival, it was confirmed that Harlow is Robert Robinson's (Adam Hunter) daughter. Paul and his son David Tanaka (Takaya Honda) meet Harlow at the prison where Robert is held. She misses out on the chance to meet her father, but is invited back to Erinsborough by David. Tina Burke of TV Week described the character as "quick witted and complicated", while Donovan stated that Harlow is "very head strong, and I enjoy playing that type of character who knows what she is doing and likes to get involved and Harlow seems to have those qualities." On 17 May 2022, Sam Warner and Daniel Kilkelly of Digital Spy confirmed that Donovan had finished filming on the serial and Harlow would be departing the soap ahead of its finale in August 2022.

== Mackenzie Hargreaves ==
Mackenzie Hargreaves, played by Georgie Stone, made her first appearance on 30 August 2019. She is the show's first transgender character, and the second trans actress to portray a trans character on Australian television. Stone's casting was announced on 23 March 2019. She had approached the show about introducing a transgender character in 2018. She wrote a letter to executive producer Jason Herbison with some ideas and received a response two hours later. Following an audition, Stone was castin the role and she worked with the producers for eight months to ensure that parts of her own story would be included in the character's storyline. Of her casting, Stone stated "I am so excited to be joining such an iconic show. Neighbours is all about telling stories we can connect to, stories that reflect our society today. It has progressed so much since it first began, which is why I thought it was time to have a trans character on the show. I can't wait for everyone to meet her!" Herbison added that during her audition, he became aware that Stone "would be able to tell the story truthfully and authentically". Stone explained to a columnist for The Australian Women's Weekly that she knew her character's story would have to have drama, but she helped to "ensure it's truthful at the same time" by including various experiences that trans people go through, including coming out, relationships, and shame due to bullying.

== Scarlett Brady ==
Scarlett Brady
- Neighbours character
- Portrayed by: Christie Whelan Browne
- Duration: 2019–2020
- First appearance: 9 September 2019
- Last appearance: 26 October 2020
- Introduced by: Jason Herbison
In-universe information
- Occupation: Porter
- Father: Kevin Brady
- Mother: Elaine Brady
- Brothers: Sam Brady
- Sisters: Stella Brady

Scarlett Brady, played by Christie Whelan Browne, made her first appearance on 9 September 2019. Whelan Browne's casting and her character details were announced on 17 June 2019. She admitted she was lucky to get the role and was unsure how it happened. She commented, "I'd auditioned a couple of times in the past. Perhaps I just seemed like a 'Scarlett' – which you can decide is a compliment (or not) after you meet her." Milly Haddrick of New Idea said Scarlett was "a troubled woman with a very dark past (and one hell of a hidden agenda!)." Whelan Browne concurred and called her character "very complex". Scarlett comes to Erinsborough with an agenda concerning a male character. Whelan Browne added that Scarlett has had her share of "pain and struggles", and she hoped viewers would have some sympathy for her, even if they shake their heads at her actions. On 3 September 2020, Jess Less of Digital Spy confirmed Whelan Browne had reprised the role. The actress said she was excited about returning, and continued "Scarlett is complex, and I knew the storyline that was planned was going to be very fun. It is fun to play her and try and empathise with her actions." Whelan Browne was five weeks pregnant when she began filming Scarlett's return scenes, but she felt safe on set and found it "comforting" to be able to work amidst the COVID-19 pandemic. Scarlett's return aired on 15 September, as she seeks revenge on Ned. She departed on 26 October.

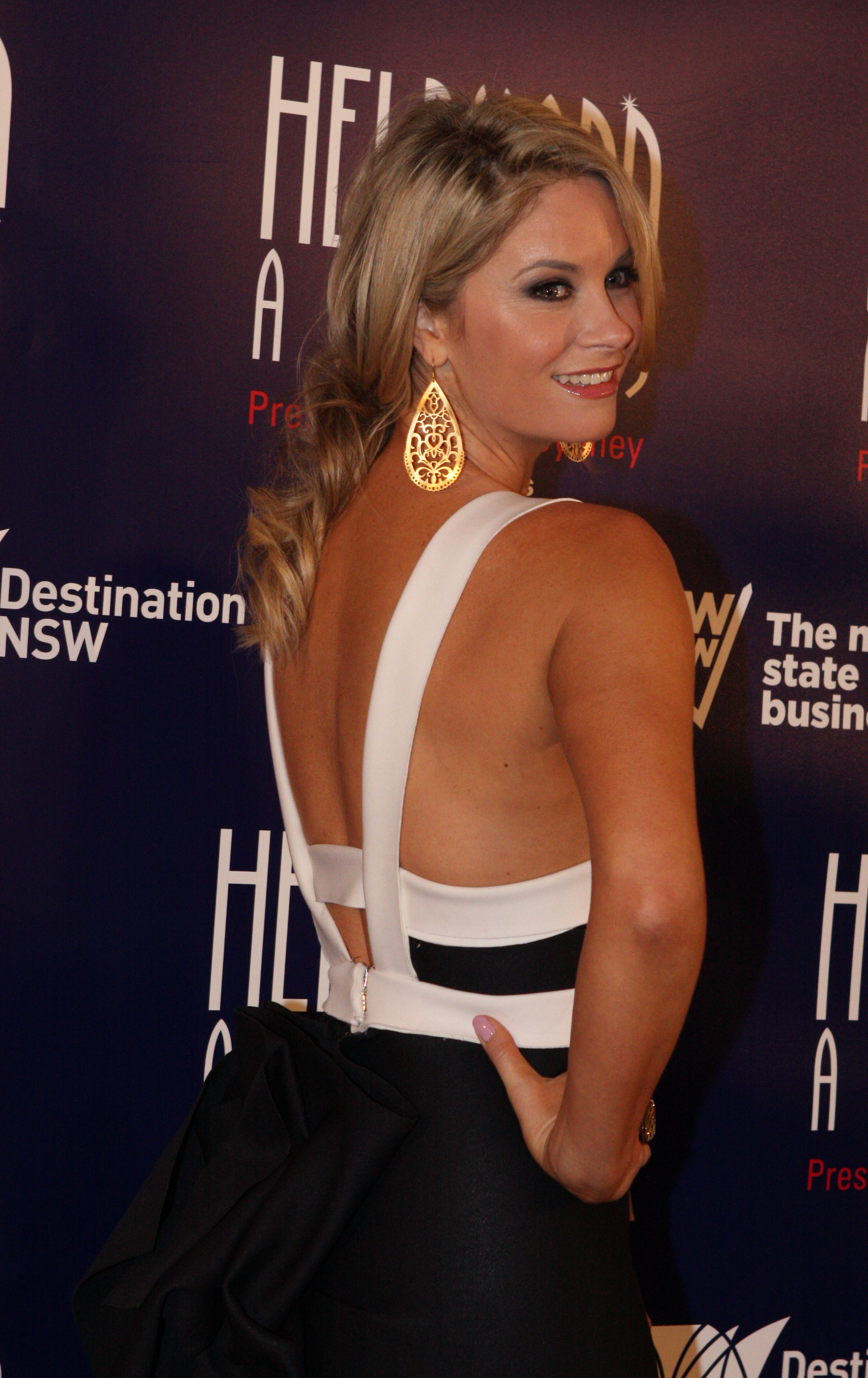
Christie Whelan Browne played Scarlett from September to October 2019.

After his flight is delayed, Ned Willis (Ben Hall) comes across Scarlett, who is wearing a wedding dress and crying at a bar in the airport. He hands her a tissue and decides to keep her company. Scarlett explains that her fiancé Rex called off their wedding in the middle of the ceremony, and she has maxed out her credit card paying for a flight home. Ned buys them some drinks. Scarlett sees Ned's phone passcode as he enters it, and later deletes a text message about an available flight. Before Ned leaves for a hotel, they take a selfie together. A week later, Scarlett comes to Erinsborough and Ned notices her in the local cafe. She tells him that she is on a personal tour of the country and thought she would start with Erinsborough after he told her about it. Realising that Ned works at Lassiters Hotel, Scarlett mentions that she has plenty of hospitality experience. She later places a suitcase behind porter Trevor Nugent (Warwick Sadler), causing him to trip over. With Trevor hospitalised, Ned offers Scarlett a job covering his shifts. To thank him, Scarlett buys them lunch, which is interrupted by Ned's girlfriend Yashvi Rebecchi (Olivia Junkeer). After they leave, Scarlett looks at a scrapbook, which contains information about her failed wedding and deceased family, and admires the selfie she took of herself and Ned. When Scarlett mentions that she is lonely, Ned gives her a tour of the area and they book dinner for three at The 82. Scarlett attempts to cause trouble between Ned and Yashvi by bringing up their age gap, before mentioning that she and Ned met at the airport, which upsets Yashvi as Ned did not tell her.

Scarlett tries to befriend Yashvi and moves into the spare room at Number 32 Ramsay Street. She spies on Ned while he showering and takes photos of him. After learning about how protective Ned can be around his former girlfriend Bea Nilsson (Bonnie Anderson), Scarlett sabotages Bea's microphone lead and calls Ned to The Waterhole on the pretext of a mix up with his shifts. Just as he goes to leave, Bea receives an electric shock. Ned helps break the connection and takes her to the hospital, making him late to meet Yashvi. Scarlett gives Yashvi an edited version of what happened to Bea and plays up Ned's involvement in helping her, which leads to them taking a break from their relationship. Scarlett uses the opportunity to get closer to Ned, and she learns that Bea has developed a heart arrhythmia from the electric shock. Scarlett soon declares that her former boyfriend Rex is stalking her, and Ned offers to stay over at Number 32 for the night. When she learns Yashvi is coming over, Scarlett lays down next to a sleeping Ned on the couch, so Yashvi catches them together. Yashvi then breaks up with Ned. Scarlett claims Rex has threatened her, and she later pays someone to throw a brick through the kitchen window, so Ned will stay with her. Scarlett initiates a kiss between them and they have sex, but Scarlett notices that Ned regrets it. She then tells Yashvi what happened and pretends to be attracted to Kyle Canning (Chris Milligan) to make Ned jealous.

Paul Robinson (Stefan Dennis) learns that Scarlett has lied about working in hotels and attempts to fire her, but she reveals that she found a hidden camera in one of the rooms and will go to the press if he does. Scarlett pretends that she has lost her phone at The 82 and while she and Ned are looking for it, he is struck by a speeding motorbike and suffers a dislocated shoulder. Scarlett insists that Ned moves into Number 32 and she soon seduces him. Yashvi confronts Scarlett about her former boyfriend Scott Mayfair (Tom Jackson), who says that she tried to kill him, but Scarlett insists that Scott is lying. She then convinces Ned to leave town for a country B&B. To celebrate Halloween, Ned and Scarlett dress up, but Ned is thrown when Scarlett wears a wedding dress and starts talking about their future. Scarlett tells Ned they are meant to be together, but when he tries to leave, she stabs him with a cheese knife. She then chases Ned through the maze, as Bea and Yashvi enter to rescue Ned. Scarlett slashes Yashvi's leg, while Bea helps Ned to escape. He collapses by a tree, where Scarlett finds him and attempts to kill him. Yashvi tackles her to the ground and Scarlett is arrested. At the police station, Paul turns up to goad Scarlett, who replies with "trick or treat". Paul later learns that the footage from the hidden camera has been given to the press.

The following year, Scarlett finds Ned on Fandangle, a content subscription service. Using the alias Scavenger_King35, she pays Ned for various nude photographs and videos. While he is on a mini-break with Yashvi, Scarlett messages Ned and asks him to meet her, where he finally learns that she is Scavenger_King35. She demands that he paints a portrait of her for her new fiancé, as "revenge" for him ruining her life. Ned initially decides to handle this on his own, telling only his cousin Roxy Willis (Zima Anderson), but is forced to confess to Yashvi after Scarlett's behaviour becomes more erratic and she slashes his portrait of her. This puts further strain on Ned and Yashvi's relationship. Scarlett later sabotages the opening of Ned's art exhibition, by replacing his portrait of Yashvi with her damaged painting. As it is unveiled, Scarlett enters and claims that Ned has been harassing her, exposing her plan to set him up as revenge for rejecting her the previous year. She then takes off in her car, and is pursued by an enraged Ned. Scarlett stops at the maze where she stabbed Ned and he gives chase. After being found by Yashvi the following morning, he claims to have no recollection of what happened. The police later find evidence suggesting that Scarlett was attacked. Ned regains some of his memories and recalls hearing someone in the boot of his car, causing him to believe he has killed Scarlett and he is charged with her homicide.

Scarlett then uses Ned's art and exhibition space, The Hive as a hiding place and overhears Bea deciding to refute the evidence against Ned. In retaliation, Scarlett sabotages the steering in her car to kill her, but this results in Terese Willis (Rebekah Elmaloglou) injuring Kyle. Levi Canning (Richie Morris) later interviews the other driver involved in the accident that killed the rest of Scarlett's family, who confesses that Scarlett's father appeared to have difficulty steering the car. Levi reports this to Yashvi and Bea, and they also suspect Scarlett was involved in the death of her family. Yashvi and Ned plan a fake wedding to lure Scarlett out of hiding. Scarlett watches the wedding unfold and attempts to throw acid on Ned's face. However, she is stopped by Levi and the acid lands on Scarlett's face, causing burns to her face. She is taken to hospital where she eventually admits her plan to frame Ned for her murder.

== Hendrix Greyson ==
Hendrix Greyson, played by Ben Turland, made his first appearance on 13 September 2019. The character and Turland's casting was announced on 1 September. Hendrix joined the regular cast as the estranged son of Pierce Greyson (Tim Robards). He arrives in Erinsborough, having been expelled from boarding school, just as his father is reconciling with his love interest Chloe Brennan (April Rose Pengilly). Pierce tells Chloe that he had very little involvement in Hendrix or his sister's upbringing, leading him to struggle with his resentful and "suave" son. Hendrix later makes romantic advances towards Chloe. Hendrix was branded "a rich spoiled brat" by Matthew Myers of DNA, and Turland said that he had a lot of fun with the character. Turland said the lack of "a father figure" in Hendrix's life led to his bad behaviour and his lashing out to get some attention. This behaviour caused an initial negative reaction from viewers. On 3 June 2022, it was announced that Hendrix would be killed off following complications from a lung transplant. The storyline was planned before the show was cancelled in early 2022, after Turland decided to leave at the end of his contract.

== Prudence Wallace ==
Prudence Wallace
- Neighbours character
- Portrayed by: Denise van Outen
- Duration: 2019–2020
- First appearance: 20 September 2019
- Last appearance: 18 March 2020
- Introduced by: Jason Herbison
In-universe information
- Sisters: Harriet Wallace
- Daughters: Harlow Robinson

Prudence "Prue" Wallace, played by Denise van Outen, made her first appearance on 20 September 2019. Van Outen's casting and character details were announced on 12 June 2019. She initially filmed alongside cast members Stefan Dennis (Paul Robinson) and Rebekah Elmaloglou (Terese Willis) while they were in London, before flying out to join them and the rest of the cast at the show's Melbourne studios. Of her casting, Van Outen said "I am thrilled to be joining the cast of one [of] the world's most iconic shows, Neighbours. To be asked is a privilege and I am very excited to get to work on a really fun storyline first in London and then heading over to Melbourne. I can't say too much just yet but my character Prue is heading to Ramsay Street to stir things up and I can't wait!"

Prue is the "enigmatic" mother of Harlow Robinson (Jemma Donovan), who was introduced earlier in 2019. Van Outen described Prue as "a lot of fun, I like the fact she is a little bit out there as well so I can play around with the character. She is a bit mischievous which is really interesting to portray." Harlow's guardians Paul and Terese decide to meet with Prue while they are honeymooning in London, but Harlow tries to deter them, knowing that Prue is a member of a cult. Prue "isn't in any rush" to have Harlow back with her and cut the meeting short. She then meets with Graham (Richard Arnold), who asks Prue to end contact with her daughter. Johnathon Hughes of Radio Times called the character "flaky, flighty" and "a hard woman to pin down". Following a brief departure, Van Outen returned in March 2020. Prue's departure aired on 18 March, as she was killed-off in a bomb explosion. Van Outen told Daniel Kilkelly of Digital Spy that she always knew her stint with the show would be short, and she was fine with Prue's death. She said, "If I was going to be part of a big episode, I wanted it to be something quite dramatic, as you want people to talk about it." She added that there was still a chance Prue could return in the future.

Prue meets with her daughter, Harlow's grandfather Paul Robinson and his wife Terese Willis in a London park to find out more about them. Prue asks after Harlow, and learns that she has not mentioned Prue much. Prue explains that she is in the wellness industry and tells Paul and Terese about the philosophies she lives her life by. Prue notices a man, Graham, watching her and cuts the meeting short. As she walks off, Graham asks how it went and Prue tells him that Paul and Terese seem kind and are looking after Harlow. He then tells her that it is time to let Harlow go because if she is not with them, she is against them. Prue sends Harlow a text asking her not to worry if she does not hear from her for a while. Just over a month later, Prue comes to Erinsborough and voices her disapproval about Harlow's living arrangement, as Paul and Terese's hotel has been caught up in a sex tape scandal. Harlow defends them, but when Paul comes home drunk and Prue learns Ned Willis (Ben Hall) is recovering from a stab wound, she wants to remove Harlow from the house. However, Prue is convinced to stay at Number 22. She later shames Paul's daughter Amy Williams (Zoe Cramond) for being in the sex tape. Prue befriends Gary Canning (Damien Richardson) at The Waterhole and they go on several dates. Harlow worries that her mother has forgotten her, but Prue makes sure to prioritise her and they start to reconnect.

Prue receives phone calls from the Restoration Order demanding payment, and she is tempted to steal from the till at The 82, but Gary catches her. She explains that the Restoration Order has helped her reach her full potential as a woman and mother, but she is worried that she will lose it all if she cannot pay the monthly fee. Gary asks to hear more about the Order and he later lends her the money she needs. Prue also attempts to convince Harlow that they could make a good life for themselves in London. When she catches Terese drinking wine, knowing that she is an alcoholic, Prue asks her to support her plan to take Harlow home to the UK and Terese agrees. Harlow decides to leave with Prue, unaware that her mother is still in the Restoration Order and planning on having her join. However, as they stop at a milk bar, Harlow recalls Prue telling Terese to "trust in the process" and realises that she is still in the Order. Prue tries to defend her intentions and the Order, but Harlow tells Prue that she will not be joining up. She begs her mother to stay in Erinsborough with her, but Prue leaves her outside the shop and flies back to London.

The following year, Prue returns to Erinsborough claiming that she has left the Restoration Order. She tries to repair her relationship with Harlow. During a barbecue at the Cannings, Prue and Gary announce that they are engaged, shocking Harlow and Gary's family. After attempting to rebuild her relationship with Harlow, it is revealed that Prue did not leave the Order – rather, she was forced out due to a lack of finances. Upon finding out, Gary calls off the wedding and decides to join his son on the glamping trip. Prue takes the box containing their honeymoon destination and follows him in her car. She pulls over when she gets lost and leaves Harlow a voicemail. She then opens the box, looking for champagne, and is killed instantly by a bomb planted by Finn Kelly (Rob Mills).

== Graham Isheev ==
Graham Isheev
- Neighbours character
- Portrayed by: Richard Arnold
- Appears on: 20 September 2019
- Introduced by: Jason Herbison

Graham Isheev, played by Richard Arnold, appeared on 20 September 2019. Arnold's casting details were announced alongside that of Denise van Outen, who plays Prue Wallace. Arnold makes a one episode appearance in scenes set and filmed in London. He commented, "I always knew my career would hit a 'dead end' eventually, but I never dreamed it would do so in such spectacular fashion joining the cast of Neighbours, home to the most famous cul-de-sac in television. G'Day Britain!" Arnold's character, Graham "exerts an unhealthy influence over Prue." Simon Timblick of What's on TV branded him "a shady character".

Graham watches Prue Wallace meet her daughter's grandfather Paul Robinson (Stefan Dennis) and his wife Terese Willis (Rebekah Elmaloglou) in St James's Park. As Prue walks past him, Graham asks her how the meeting went and she says that Harlow (Jemma Donovan) is being well looked after. Graham then tells Prue that it is time to let Harlow go because if she is not with them, then she is against them. Prue agrees.

== Grant Hargreaves ==
Grant Hargreaves
- Neighbours character
- Portrayed by: Paul Mercurio
- Duration: 2019–2020, 2022
- First appearance: 8 October 2019
- Last appearance: 14 July 2022
- Introduced by: Jason Herbison
In-universe information
- Wife: Sarah Hargreaves (deceased)
- Daughters: Mackenzie Hargreaves

Grant Hargreaves, played by Paul Mercurio, made his first appearance on 8 October 2019. Mercurio's casting was announced on 29 September, while the character has been mention on-screen several times. Grant is Mackenzie Hargreaves's (Georgie Stone) estranged father. His friend Shane Rebecchi (Nicholas Coghlan) has been trying to track him down on Mackenzie's behalf, as she hopes to reconcile with him. As Grant and Mackenzie meet for the first time since she transitioned, Grant "immediately slips up" when he calls Mackenzie by her old name. Seeing Grant's ignorance, Shane calls out his behaviour and tells him to support his daughter. When Grant meets with Mackenzie again, he asks that they start over and calls her by her real name. Mercurio reprises the role in June 2022, as Grant returns to Erinsborough to give Mackenzie away at her wedding to Hendrix Greyson (Ben Turland).

After learning that Shane Rebecchi has been trying to get in contact with him, Grant calls him to say that he is coming to Erinsborough. Grant goes to Harold's Café, where he meets Shane's wife Dipi Rebecchi (Sharon Johal) and is reunited with his daughter Mackenzie. He calls her by her old name, Michael, and reveals that he thought about contacting her after her mother died, but he was busy with work and was worried about what he would find if he did. Grant admits that he still thinks of Mackenzie as a boy, causing her to leave. Shane comes to see Grant and says that he regrets telling Grant to put a stop to Mackenzie dressing as a girl when she was young. Shane berates Grant for his attitude towards Mackenzie, leading Grant to ask her if they can try again and calls her Mackenzie for the first time. Mackenzie tells Grant about the Be You Ball and invites him to partner her for the father-daughter dance. He asks to think about it, but later turns up at the Rebecchi's home in a suit. He spends time with the other parents, while their children go to a pre-dance party. Grant leaves the house at the same time as the others, but he does not turn up at The Pavilion. Shane finds Grant at the cafe and tells him that he will miss the dance if they do not leave soon. Grant says that he cannot go, as dancing with his son in a father-daughter dance is wrong. He refuses to change his mind and asks Shane to explain it to Mackenzie. He also asks that Shane tells her he is sorry, and he leaves for Barham.

Months later, Shane contacts Grant about Mackenzie's 18th birthday and learns that Grant has been injured in a workplace accident. Shane tells Dipi that they need to help, as Grant is broke. He also wants to tell Mackenzie the news, but Dipi tells him not to get involved as Grant has already hurt Mackenzie. Shane later sends Grant some money, and Grant comes to Erinsborough. He apologises to Mackenzie for not attending the school dance and for missing her 18th birthday, which Mackenzie accepts when Grant says he wants to get to know her. Grant meets with Shane's brother Toadfish Rebecchi (Ryan Moloney) to discuss a WorkSafe claim. Toadie tells Grant that he will take on his case pro bono. After spending the afternoon together, Mackenzie asks Grant to stay in town longer. Dipi confronts Grant about his relationship with Mackenzie and whether he is going to hurt her again. He tells her that he is trying to accept Mackenzie. He attends the Lassiters Pride event, where he meets Mackenzie's boyfriend Richie Amblin (Lachlan Millar), and refers to Mackenzie as his daughter for the first time. Grant tells Shane that his WorkSafe claim has been successful and he will return to work when his back is better, so that he can pay the loan back. Before he leaves town, Grant tells Mackenzie that when he left her mother, he met another woman and they had two children. Mackenzie realises that he has not told them about her, but Grant explains that he was ashamed of what he did and how he abandoned his family. He tells her that he wants to put things right and invites her to meet her siblings, which she accepts.

Two years later, Grant returns to Erinsborough for Mackenzie's wedding to Hendrix Greyson and clashes with Hendrix's father, Pierce Greyson (Tim Robards). Grant walks Mackenzie down the aisle and gives her away to Hendrix, and Grant later leaves after the wedding. Grant returns to Erinsborough a few days later, to support Mackenzie after Hendrix's sudden death. When Grant criticises Mackenzie's ways of grieving out of overprotection, Mackenzie tells him to leave town.

== Kane Jones ==
Kane Jones
- Neighbours character
- Portrayed by: Barry Conrad
- Duration: 2019–2021
- First appearance: 15 November 2019
- Last appearance: 13 January 2021
- Introduced by: Jason Herbison

Kane Jones, played by Barry Conrad, made his first appearance on 15 November 2019. The character was introduced as part of a storyline involving Ned Willis (Ben Hall), who joins a fight club in a bid to ease his PTSD. Conrad was later asked to reprise the role, as Kane returns to host some illegal blackjack games that Hendrix Greyson (Benny Turland) takes part in. Conrad expressed his delight at being asked back, saying "It was an absolute thrill. I was totally over the moon, because there was nothing to suggest that Kane would be back after the viewers last saw him. He went to jail and it seemed like that was it. All this time had passed, so when I got the call to say that I'd be coming back, I was like: 'Yes!' It was very exciting.""

Conrad confirmed that Kane was released from prison for good behaviour and that viewers would see a different side to him. As Hendrix accumulates a big debt, Kane has to scare and intimidate him in a bid to get his money. When asked by Digital Spy's Daniel Kilkelly whether Kane is capable of killing someone, Conrad reckoned that his character does not have "the DNA to kill – I don't think he's that guy." Conrad also said that he and his character are quite different, describing Kane as being more serious than him. Conrad also told Kilkelly that he would like to explore Kane's backstory one day, as he had to create his own to justify Kane's behaviour. He explained: "I think it'd be great to actually flesh out some of that in the future. There's definitely more to Kane and I've tried to explore that as the episodes unfold in his interactions with certain characters. He's a complex, layered guy – like we all are. There's not just one side to anyone. This time around, rather than Kane just standing there looking grumpy and beating people up, you'll see more light and shade, a bit of levity. That's really exciting."

While working out at local gym The Shed, Kane notices owner Aaron Brennan (Matt Wilson) telling Ned Willis to take things easy. Kane gives Ned an address and tells him to come after 9pm if he wants to let loose properly. When Ned shows up to see a fight in progress, Kane tells him that there are no rules and no holding back. Kane later challenges Ned to a fight, which Ned wins. After Aaron sees Kane and Ned talking, he follows Ned to a fight and persuades Ned to stop, however, Kane pressures Ned to continue. Bea Nilsson (Bonnie Anderson) meets with Kane to arrange a fight, but Ned pulls Bea out before she is hurt and he stops going to the fights. Yashvi Rebecchi (Olivia Junkeer) calls the police on the ring and gets it shut down. Kane later watches Yashvi and Ned together at The Waterhole and spikes her drink with broken glass. Yashvi's father Shane Rebecchi (Nicholas Coghlan) meets with Kane to confront him, but he is interrupted by Yashvi and Ned. Kane threatens them, but Yashvi gets Kane to admit that he runs the fight ring and put the glass in her drink, before revealing that she has recorded everything and already contacted the police, who turn up and arrest Kane. Ned later visits Kane in prison to ask about Zenin Alexio, who believes Ned saw something at the fight ring and is threatening him and Yashvi. Kane does not have much information and tells Ned that those men do not mess around, and that he is safer inside.

Months later, having been paroled for good behaviour, Kane returns to Erinsborough to run illegal blackjack games at Lassiters Hotel. Hendrix Greyson attends one of the games and wins big, but he loses badly at the following game as Kane encourages him to bet more and more. Kane is forced to move the games after the hotel receives complaints, so Hendrix suggests they use his former house on Ramsay Street. Kane meets Aaron Brennan and Nicolette Stone (Charlotte Chimes) outside the community centre, where he is doing his community service. At the game later that night, Hendrix loses again but asks to borrow some money from Kane, who agrees. Hendrix continues to lose and ends up owing Kane $10,000, which he demands Hendrix pay the following day. Hendrix tells Kane that he cannot pay, as his father is away on business, so Kane gives him more time, but tells him that he will charge a lot of interest. Kane later threatens Hendrix by sending him a bullet. Hendrix gives Kane a diamond necklace to pay off his debt, but Kane says it only covers half of it. He also tells Hendrix that he wants to continue using the house for future games, which he expects Hendrix to attend. Hendrix bets and loses the house to Kane, who begins hassling him for the deed. When Kane learns Nicolette needs money, he invites her to join the blackjack games. Kane makes another threat towards Hendrix, leading to Hendrix taking a gun from another player for protection. Kane later turns up at the house and refuses to leave unless Hendrix signs it over to him. When Hendrix reveals that his stepmother knows about the games and is going to the police, Kane grabs hold of him and is about to hurt him when Chloe Brennan (April Rose Pengilly) arrives and tells him the police are coming. Kane is later arrested by Yashvi and her partner. At the station, they question him about kidnapping Hendrix's ex-girlfriend Harlow Robinson (Jemma Donovan), but Kane insists that he is not responsible and is later found to have an alibi.

== Others ==
Date(s)	Character	Actor	Circumstances
3 January	Stephen Wright	Liam Maguire	Two solicitors prosecuting Susan Kennedy for the attempted murder of Finn Kelly. Susan's lawyer Toadfish Rebecchi maintains that Susan is of good character and pushed Finn from a cliff in self-defence to protect herself and her nieces. Stephen raises the issue of Susan's visits to Finn's hospital room. Susan explains to him that she is remorseful for her actions, but she feels compassion for Finn, even though he has put her family through hell. She wants Finn to get better and have an opportunity to redeem himself. The charges against Susan are dropped and the incident is ruled as self-defence. Haslam is credited as "Solicitor", but is named Victoria Grayling in the episode.
3 January	Solicitor	Victoria Haslam	
7 January	Lola McNuffy	Jaime Allan	A customer at the Lassiters day spa, who is getting her nails filed by Xanthe Canning when Xanthe suddenly stops and leaves.
8 January 2019 – 13 March 2020	Keyboardist	Adam Rigley	A keyboardist who accompanies Bea Nilsson when she performs at The Waterhole.
14 January	Constable Matilda Jackson	Brydi Frances	Constable Jackson informs the patrons of Harold's Cafe that there has been a shooting in The Waterhole. She asks them to stay inside until the situation is declared safe, as the gunman is still on the loose.
28 January	Francis Rae	Sally Anne Mitchell	A doctor who sees Sonya Rebecchi after she collapses and suffers from stomach pains. Dr Rae believes Sonya's symptoms could be irritable bowel syndrome or internal scarring from some pesticide she recently ingested. Dr Rae and Karl Kennedy want Sonya to undergo a colonoscopy and a reproductive ultrasound.
28 January	Peter Noel	Abhi Parasher	A sonographer who carries out an ultrasound on Sonya Rebecchi.
28 January	Louisa Leung	Christina McLachlan	A gynecologist who informs Sonya Rebecchi that she has a large ovarian cyst that will need to be removed surgically. Dr Leung also informs her that they may have to remove the ovary, and they will need her consent in case they have to perform a hysterectomy.
29 January–4 March	Dr Kristin Goodwin	Renai Caruso	An oncologist who takes over Sonya Rebecchi's care. Dr Goodwin informs Sonya that she has stage four ovarian cancer, which has already spread to her gastrointestinal tract, liver, and brain. Dr Goodwin says that the results are conclusive and her chemotherapy treatment will begin the following day. Weeks later, Sonya attends an appointment with Dr Goodwin, who informs her that the chemotherapy has not worked and the cancer has spread.
1 February	Maria Alvarez	Jessica Drew	A potential buyer for one of the Robinson Pines properties. When she notices Amy Williams setting up for the launch event, she informs her that the email invite said it would start at 11am and not 3pm.
4 February	Claire Marshall	Emily Joy	A chemotherapy nurse who tells Sonya Rebecchi and her husband Toadfish Rebecchi what to expect as she begins treatment for ovarian cancer. Claire later advises Sonya on how much water to drink following the chemo.
4 February	Felix Benson	Shane Palmer	A customer at Sonya's Nursery. He asks Yashvi Rebecchi for some advice about purchasing a tree, but when she gets flustered, they are interrupted by Sonya Rebecchi, who helps Felix instead.
5 February	Frank Scigliano	Robert Pham	A delivery man, who brings a large floral heart to Lassiters for their Valentine's Day event. Chloe Brennan helps Frank to lift it out of the van, and she cuts her arm on the thorns.
6 February	Jane Fraser	Julia Davis	A British investor, who meets with Paul Robinson at The Waterhole to discuss his new property development Robinson Pines. Paul brings her over to meet Terese Willis and Leo Tanaka, before agreeing to take her up to his penthouse apartment to see the view.
7 February	Lassiters Employee	John Sanderson	The Lassiters Employee helps to place a large floral heart in the middle of the complex.
8 February	Bethany Charles	Rute Palma	A social worker sent on behalf of Andrea Somers to see Toadfish Rebecchi and Sonya Rebecchi. Bethany tells them that she is not there to assess Andrea and Toadie's son Hugo Somers, but Sonya.
14–27 February	Heath Kabel	Tim Conlon	The new manager of Fitzgerald Motors stops by the garage to pick up the books, but he interrupts Bea Nilsson and Ned Willis having sex. Bea apologises, but Heath tells them he is a day early and they should go and spend Valentine's Day together. Melissa Lohan later comes by and introduces herself to Heath, after learning he is the boss. Heath gives Bea various days off, due to the garage's lack of business. She confronts him about staggering the jobs they do get and tells him she has booked in some vans for a service. Heath meets up with Mel to tell her that Bea is rebooking the jobs he is cancelling, and it emerges that she is paying him to run the business into the ground. Mel asks him for the keys to the garage and she starts a fire, which almost kills Bea. Heath tells Mel that he is backing out of their deal, and wants his share of the money she promised him, or he will go to the police. Mel pays him, and he leaves town, but he later makes a deal with the police that leads to Mel's arrest.
19 February	Marta Hepnarova	Madeline Davis	A Czech backpacker, who Leo Tanaka introduces to Piper Willis and Ned Willis, before joining her in one of the bedrooms.
19 February	Phillipe Gregory	Kevin Dee	Gary Canning's new boss at a warehouse. Phillipe is not happy when Gary turns up late to his first shift. He tells him to see the safety officer and then asks him to move some damaged cartons. Later that day, he tells Gary to get the rest of the cartons moved before he leaves.
26 February	Patricia Dalton	Joanna Sakkas	A backpacker, who is asleep in Leo Tanaka's bed when his brother comes to see him.
27 February	Erica King	Betty Bobbitt	Members of a 40 year old book club that Sheila Canning has joined. The club meet at The Waterhole to discuss a self help book they have been reading. Sheila invites Susan Kennedy along, but she disagrees with the book's advice. The actresses are all former Prisoner cast members, who made their appearances to celebrate the show's 40th anniversary.
27 February	Chrissie Reynolds	Jentah Sobott	Members of a 40 year old book club that Sheila Canning has joined. The club meet at The Waterhole to discuss a self help book they have been reading. Sheila invites Susan Kennedy along, but she disagrees with the book's advice. The actresses are all former Prisoner cast members, who made their appearances to celebrate the show's 40th anniversary.
27 February	Fiona Bennett	Jenny Lovell	Members of a 40 year old book club that Sheila Canning has joined. The club meet at The Waterhole to discuss a self help book they have been reading. Sheila invites Susan Kennedy along, but she disagrees with the book's advice. The actresses are all former Prisoner cast members, who made their appearances to celebrate the show's 40th anniversary.
27 February	Meg Fletcher	Jane Clifton	Members of a 40 year old book club that Sheila Canning has joined. The club meet at The Waterhole to discuss a self help book they have been reading. Sheila invites Susan Kennedy along, but she disagrees with the book's advice. The actresses are all former Prisoner cast members, who made their appearances to celebrate the show's 40th anniversary.
7 March	Dr Reece Mahoney	Simon Corfield	A neurologist who comes to check on Finn Kelly, after he wakes from a four-month coma. Finn believes it is 2007 and he is 19 years old. Dr Mahoney tells him that he has suffered a traumatic brain injury and it appears his long-term memory has been affected. David Tanaka asks whether Finn could be faking retrograde amnesia, but Dr Mahoney does not think so, and assures him he will have Finn assessed by experts in the condition.
15 March	Rachel Chen	Shirong Woo	A maid at Lassiters Hotel, who watches on as Chloe Brennan inspects the cleaning job in one of the hotel rooms. Rachel notices Chloe's suitcases, and Chloe says that she has been staying with her brother's bridal party, before dismissing her.
26 March	Renata Bryant	Carolyn Masson	The vice principal of Erinsborough High, who learns from Susan Kennedy that criminal Finn Kelly is visiting the school. Susan tells her that the students and staff need to be gone by 4pm, as Renata voices her concerns about the visit.
27 March–28 May	Dr Dora Dietrich	Kirsty Hillhouse	The doctor informs Elly Conway that she is not pregnant, and likely received a false positive because of a sedative she took. Weeks later, Elly becomes pregnant and is booked in for an ultrasound by her husband Mark Brennan, but when she sees Dr Dietrich at the hospital, she thanks her for her time, confusing the doctor. Elly reschedules and admits to Dr Dietrich that Mark is not the biological father of her baby and he does not know it yet. Dr Dietrich offers to carry out the ultrasound, as it does not show anything about paternity, and assures Elly that she will not tell Mark anything that Elly does not tell him herself. Elly refuses to keep the photo when Dr Dietrich tries to give it to her. Dr Dietrich encourages Elly to tell Mark the truth, as she will not be able to hide it forever. As Elly leaves, Dr Dietrich's son Dean Mahoney comes in to see her and she tells him to wait in her office. When Elly is admitted to the hospital after being pushed to the ground, Dr Dietrich informs her that she has suffered a minor placental abruption and will be kept in for observation. At Elly's next check-up, Dr Dietrich tells Elly that her blood pressure is high. Elly's aunt Susan Kennedy then informs her that her son Dean Mahoney gained access to Elly's medical records and blackmailed her into giving him better grades. They leave her to deal with Dean.
28 March	Anton Prinis	Mark Casamento	A jeweller who brings Gary Canning the engagement ring he has picked out to The Waterhole.
4–12 April	Max Walpole	Chris Broadstock	A businessman who meets with Chloe Brennan at The Waterhole. She asks that they go somewhere more private, but they are interrupted by her brother Aaron Brennan, who thinks they are on a date. The following week, Max returns to meet with Paul Robinson and invest in the Robinson Pines development. Before he can sign the contract, Max learns that Chloe is not Amy Williams, the project manager, when they are interrupted by the real Amy, Leo Tanaka, and Terese Willis.
9 April	Clarence Pang	John Voce	A staff member from Eden Hills Grammar school, who comes to Harold's Cafe to interview Elly Conway about a teaching position. The interview goes well, until Clarence asks Elly about how she would deal with cheaters, and she breaks down in tears and runs to the bathroom.
18 April	Prosecutor Nicholas Archer	Alex Pinder	The prosecutor at Finn Kelly's sentencing hearing, who urges Judge Jan Barton to hand down a custodial sentence. He later informs Judge Barton that he cannot contact witness Elly Brennan, leading to an adjournment.
19 April	Warren Stacks	Joshua Payne	A backpacker, who gets into a fight with another guest at the Erinsborough Backpackers. He tells David Tanaka to stay out of it, before David is punched by the other guest when he swings at Warren.
6 June	Demi Nicolaidis	Cecelia Lowe	A woman who runs an art therapy class at Lassiters Lake attended by Elly Conway, Bea Nilsson, Finn Kelly and Shaun Watkins. Demi asks the participants to partner up and sketch each other.
7 June–19 August 2019, 21 January–26 July 2021, 21 May 2024—9 December 2025	Dr Stevie Hart	Jazz Bell	An obstetrician. She conducts Elly Conway's 12-week ultrasound and confirms that everything is fine with the baby. She later conducts Elly's 22-week scan and asks whether Elly wants to know the sex of the baby, but Elly wants to keep it a surprise. A couple of years later, Dr Hart carries out Nicolette Stone's first ultrasound in the presence of the fathers Aaron Brennan and David Tanaka. Months later, Nicolette is brought in after being found unconscious and Dr Hart informs Aaron, David, Jane Harris and Chloe Brennan that she has a minor cervical laceration and has suffered an amniotic fluid embolism. After Nicolette goes missing, David finds Dr Hart in the hospital and tells her he needs to talk about Nicolette. Dr Hart tells David that she is aware of the situation and that a few nurses mentioned that David had been calling. David asks Dr Hart if Nicolette has made contact. He questions whether Dr Hart has received a request to transfer Nicolette's patient files. Dr Hart tells him that she cannot answer that question, leading David to ask whether she can confirm or deny whether Nicolette has made contact. Dr Hart once again tells him she cannot answer. She apologises for the hard time David is going through and says that she cannot give out any information. Later, Dr Hart is approached by David and he says that he knows she knows something. He begs for Dr Hart to tell him what she knows and she says that she can't, before telling him that she is surprised he is asking her to break Nicolette's confidentiality. David asks her to put himself in his position and that he has a right to know where they are. Dr Hart says the situation is beginning to feel like harassment, before Aaron arrives and apologies to Dr Hart. Years later, Stevie attends Karl Kennedy's leaving party at The Waterhole. She later acknowledges Remi Varga-Murphy's complaints against Gavin Bowman's inappropriate comments, but also suggests that his ideas around Dex Varga-Murphy's recent poisoning are worth exploring.
11 June–9 July	Ian Packer	Nathan Carter	Toadfish Rebecchi and Andrea Somers visit Ian to discuss Karen, a woman he once knew, who strongly resembles Andrea and Toadie's former wife, Dee Bliss. Ian explains that he met Karen in 2009, as she was in town for her sister's funeral. Ian says he lost contact with her when she moved to South Africa with her new husband. Ian later meets with Andrea at her apartment and reveals that everything he said to Toadie was true, except Karen's location, which only he and Andrea know. He hands Andrea and photograph of Karen and she seduces him. Ian calls Andrea, but she refuses to meet up with him and asks him not to contact her again. However, Ian comes to Lassiters Hotel and tells Andrea he wants them to be together, but Andrea tells him to leave. Ian confronts Andrea, saying he will tell Toadie the truth and give him a copy of the photo if she does not go to dinner with him. Toadie sees them together and they tell him that Ian came to town to sell his crystals and wanted to see how the search for Karen was going, but they disagreed about talking to Toadie about it.
14 June	Jamie Whitby	Maddy Tyers	A record producer who helps Bea Nilsson record her single "Sorry" at a studio.
27 June	Aleesha Procter	Kaitlin Devine	A young woman who attends an adult literacy class run by Finn Kelly. She decides to leave because the class is not what she expected, but Bea Nilsson convinces her to stay by explaining that Finn helped her with her dyslexia.
1 July	Julianne Wargreen	Julie Arnold	Lassiters Hotel share holders, who meet with Terese Willis and Paul Robinson to discuss how to fix the damage to the hotel's reputation, after it was connected to a stolen horse. Pierce Greyson helps talk the investors round, until the meeting is sabotaged by Terese's niece Roxy Willis, who goes topless as she brings the group drinks. The investors pull out of the hotel the following day.
1 July	Frank Terminelli	Donald Windsor	Lassiters Hotel share holders, who meet with Terese Willis and Paul Robinson to discuss how to fix the damage to the hotel's reputation, after it was connected to a stolen horse. Pierce Greyson helps talk the investors round, until the meeting is sabotaged by Terese's niece Roxy Willis, who goes topless as she brings the group drinks. The investors pull out of the hotel the following day.
1 July	Jason Kenner	Antony Ting	Lassiters Hotel share holders, who meet with Terese Willis and Paul Robinson to discuss how to fix the damage to the hotel's reputation, after it was connected to a stolen horse. Pierce Greyson helps talk the investors round, until the meeting is sabotaged by Terese's niece Roxy Willis, who goes topless as she brings the group drinks. The investors pull out of the hotel the following day.
2 July	Crystal Buttrose	Rachel Soding	Ebony Buttrose's sister, who stays at Ebony and Pierce Greyson's new home with her children, as she struggles financially. Chloe Brennan helps to find Crystal somewhere permanent to live, as Pierce is unaware of her presence.
2 July	Baby	Benjamin Donis	Crystal Buttrose's infant son.
4 July	Rachel Echols	Carolyn Dante	Heather Schilling meets with Rachel to ask her about a woman called Karen, who she says is her niece. Rachel does not recognise Karen, but she remembers that a man came to a job interview at her café on Karen's behalf. Rachel puts Heather in contact with the current owner of the café.
4 July	Tanya Conlin	Oakley Kwon	The owner of a Byron Bay café, who provides Heather Schilling with the name and phone number for Riley Cooper.
15 July	Luka Eve	Taylor Than-Htay	A young man who signs up for Yashvi Rebecchi's Erinsborough street art tour. He is not impressed by Yashvi's lack of knowledge of the art and the artists. When he learns that Finn Kelly is on the tour, he tries to get a photograph, causing Finn to leave.
15 July	Gabriel Manfield	Duncan Munroe	A prison guard, who informs David Tanaka, Aaron Brennan, and Harlow Robinson that meetings have been delayed by an hour.
17 July	Nurse Jenny Lonergan	Eleanor Howlett	A prison nurse who takes a DNA swab from Andrea Somers. Toadfish Rebecchi also asks her to get a sample from Heather Schilling.
18 July–12 August	Alfie Sutton	Harry Borland	A young man who takes Yashvi Rebecchi's Dark Erinsborough tour, which focuses on the crimes of Finn Kelly. Alfie appears to know all about Finn's history and asks Yashvi when they are going to meet him, but she says that will not happen. At Ramsay Street, Alfie learns where Finn lives and realises that one of his victims Bea Nilsson lives with him. Yashvi takes the group to the high school, but when she leave them for a moment, Alfie takes the opportunity to slip away and return to Ramsay Street, where he goes inside Number 28. He meets Bea and stops her from leaving the house, so he can question her and get a photo. Finn returns home and grabs Alfie, before pinning him to the couch. When threatened with the police, Alfie counters that he will tell them Finn assaulted him, so Finn lets him go. Alfie returns to steal some of Finn's clothes, and he is later caught by Bea. He tells her that he is making money by bringing together other Finn Kelly fans, and attendance could double is he mentions Finn's assault on him. Bea says that she feels sorry for him for having to create fantasy stories and orders him to leave. Bea arranges to meet Alfie and offers him Finn's glasses in exchange for him cancelling his event, which he agrees to do. Alfie later plans to break into Number 28 and live stream it.
18 July	Keyboardist	Mark Sadka	The keyboardist accompanies Bea Nilsson when she performs at The Waterhole.
22 July	Macayde Albina	Alexis Watt	A woman who attends a bachelor auction at The Waterhole. She takes a liking to Kyle Canning and wins him with a bid of $500. It later emerges that Macayde was paid by Paul Robinson to bid on Kyle.
26 July	Sister Grace	Julie Nihill	A nun from a woman's shelter, who comes to Erinsborough to explain what happened on the night Heather Schilling gave birth to Andrea Somers and Dee Bliss. She tells them that Heather was in a bad way upon her arrival at the shelter and appeared unaware that she was carrying twins. After giving birth, Heather struggled to care for two babies, and Sister Grace's superior, Sister Mildred, decided to give Dee to the Bliss family. Sister Grace tried to check up on Andrea and Dee over the years. Heather blames Sister Grace for ruining their lives, while Toadfish Rebecchi points out that what the Sisters did was illegal. Sister Grace leaves to give a statement to the police.
1 August 2019–18 March 2021, 4, 25 December 2023	Richie Amblin	Lachlan Millar	An Erinsborough High student who annoys Elly Conway by calling her by her married name, knowing she is divorced. He later comments on the fact that she is living with criminal Finn Kelly. Richie asks Elly to buy him alcohol like she did for his friend Dean Mahoney. Chloe Brennan confronts Richie in front of his friends for hassling Elly. He then returns to school with alcohol and informs Elly that he is going to tell everyone about what she did because of Chloe's interference. Richie asks Mackenzie Hargreaves to the upcoming school dance, but she turns him down as she might not be in town by then. He later overhears that she is transgender, but does not say anything. However, Yashvi Rebecchi confronts him and accidentally outs Mackenzie. Richie later joins a protest in support of Mackenzie using the girls' bathroom. Richie and Mackenzie later admit their feelings for each other and become a couple. Richie attends Mackenzie's 18th Birthday Party and also attended the Lassiters Pride Event, where he meets Mackenzie's father, Grant Hargreaves. Richie and Mackenzie later break up. Richie returns and joins the protest to save the School but is quickly confronted by police officers. He then uses dead weight resistance and is carried from the premises. Richie returns on Christmas Day for a party at Number 32 Ramsay Street.
7 August 2019 – 7 May 2021	Angela Lane	Amanda Harrison	An Erinsborough High parent and member of the PTA. She listens to Elly Conway's explanation about how she almost gave alcohol to a student, and changed his grade, which has been subsequently rectified. Angela is unsatisfied by the absence of the principal and the meeting's short notice. She makes it clear that she feels the children are at risk and tells Elly she is withdrawing her daughter. She also makes a homophobic remark and says Elly is an abomination to the teaching community. She encourages other parents to withdraw their children from the school. Susan Kennedy arranges mediation with Angela, Dipi Rebecchi and Elly to sort the situation, but Angela wants Elly to resign or be removed. Angela later backs down when her daughter Lacy Lane refuses to leave the school and helps launch a petition supporting Elly. Angela warns Elly that she will be watching her conduct. When transgender student Mackenzie Hargreaves comes to Erinsborough High, Angela and several other parents from the PTA concerns voice concerns about her using facilities meant for girls. Susan responds by telling them that the school will not tolerate transphobia. The following year, after Susan, together with her family and neighbours are terrorised by Finn Kelly, Angela and other parents on the PTA request her resignation, due to Susan agreeing to house Finn. It emerges that Claudia Watkins, together with her lawyer Samantha Fitzgerald, is assisting the campaign in order to compile stress on Susan and cast doubt on her ability to look after Elly's daughter Aster Conway. Angela also repeatedly calls Susan for a one-to-one meeting, stressing her further, and causing Susan to have a panic attack and cancel. When she does this repeatedly again, a stressed Susan inadvertently lashes out at Mackenzie, which Claudia witnesses and uses as leverage to secure custody of Aster. A few months later, Susan's neighbour Toadie Rebecchi decides to go on a date with Angela. However, Susan and her husband Karl Kennedy witness their first meeting, and approach Toadie to warn him of how Angela has treated Susan and Elly in the past. Toadie attempts to let her down gently, but she begs for another chance, which Karl overhears. Upon realising that Karl has informed Toadie of her past behaviour, she defends her actions and insults the Kennedys, Elly and Toadie before leaving. The following year, Angela visits Toadie at home to discuss Lacy, who Toadie is representing. Toadie is initially hesitant to have Angela there, as Mackenzie lives with him. Angela mentions how she is reassessing her life and the past mistakes she has made. When Angela later thanks Toadie, she hears his cat-themed ringtone, which he claims his assistant changed, and sees Paul Robinson give Toadie a package from Juicy Jungle, an animal-print clothing company. Angela also talks with Susan, who mentions that Toadie deserves a real girlfriend and that he cannot be hurt again. Angela later returns to Toadie's house and propositions him by showing him her bra, which she bought from Juicy Jungle. His assistant Melanie Pearson interrupts and Angela leaves. She meets Mackenzie and apologises for her past actions. Susan and Karl invite Angela to dinner, as they are under the impression that she is dating Toadie. Angela compliments Susan on the smell of the food and makes romantic advances towards to Toadie. During dinner, Melanie arrives and tells Angela that Toadie is not interested in her, which Angela initially dismisses, until Toadie confirms it. Angela tells Susan that the food was as bad as it smelt, so Susan retaliates and says that Angela's perfume is cheap. Toadie then reveals he is dating Melanie, before apologising to Angela.
9 August	Marie Bermingham	Fanny Hanusin	The assistant principal of Erinsborough High, who informs Elly Conway that more parents are withdrawing their children from the school. Marie wants to call Susan Kennedy, but Elly asks her not to and says she will fix the issue. Elly later tells Marie about her plan to talk to Angela Lane, who is behind a smear campaign, but Marie admits that she has called Susan and her advice is to do nothing until she returns.
12 August 2019 – 4 September 2020	Lacy Lane	Sophie Hardy	Angela Lane's daughter, who, along with Kirsha Rebecchi, starts a petition supporting teacher Elly Conway, after her mother wants her removed from the school. Angela comes to collect Lacy from Harold's Cafe and tells Elly that she is backing down due to the petition. Lacy attends the school dance, along with her older sister Olivia Lane, and wins a prize for Best Dancer. The following year, Lacy films Richie Amblin's sustainability presentation for broadcast on Erinsborough High's website. Harlow Robinson confronts Lacy after she posts a scathing blog about her campaign ahead of the upcoming Youth Adviser election. Lacy tells her that she also wrote a similar post about Mackenzie Hargreaves, and that she is not going to vote for either of them. Police constable Yashvi Rebecchi discovers that Lacy has been dealing amphetamines at Erinsborough High on behalf of Dax Braddock.
14 August	Nigel Davis	Quentin Walker	The manager of King Calaway, who are playing at the Live at Lassiters festival, congratulates Bea Nilsson on her performance. He also invites her to perform with the band at some point, and promises to get in touch.
19–20 August	Carmen Del Close	Veronica Thomas	A woman who comes to the Back Lane Bar and is attracted to owner Leo Tanaka. She later has a drink with Pierce Greyson, but she turns down his offer of dinner, as she is interested in Leo. Carmen stays behind as Leo closes up, and she sends a text saying that "he is falling for it". Carmen and Leo kiss and he suggests they go back to his house. The next morning, Carmen meets Leo's housemates and brother, before helping Leo with the Back Lane Bar finances, as she is an accountant. While Leo is in the shower, Carmen accesses the account. She is briefly interrupted by Ned Willis, who thinks he recognises her, before leaving. Leo later finds the bank account empty and learns Carmen is actually his former business partner, Vance Abernethy's, cousin, named Carly Abernethy.
10 September	Elvis	Mark Andrew	An Elvis Presley impersonator who marries Paul Robinson and Terese Willis.
12 September – 11 October	Cherie Reyner	Mahalia Brown	An Erinsborough High teacher, who supports Susan Kennedy as she deals with the outing of Mackenzie Hargreaves as transgender. Cherie and Marty Muggleton ask Susan what they should say to students and parents. Cherie suggests they should have a discussion, but Susan refuses as it could turn Mackenzie into a spectacle. Susan later admits to Cherie that she was wrong about asking Mackenzie to use the disabled bathroom. Cherie and Marty chaperone the school dance and explain to Pierce Greyson that the priority for the evening is not to let the students drink alcohol. In Neighbours: Erinsborough High emerges that Cherie has been dating student Olivia Lane and tries to shift the blame of dating Olivia onto Marty through an encrypted text. She attempts to convince Olivia to stay silent about their relationship until after she finishes Year 12. However, Olivia confesses to Yashvi, Marty and her mother Angela Lane, leaving all three disgusted. Cherie is then arrested and fired from her job.
12 September 2019–29 October 2020, 4 December 2023	Marty Muggleton	Nikolai Egel	An Erinsborough High teacher who is unhappy that he was not informed that student Mackenzie Hargreaves is transgender, he and Cherie Reyner ask Susan Kennedy what they should say to students and parents. Marty deals with Yashvi Rebecchi and a group of students, who start a protest in support of Mackenzie. Marty later complains that half his class is part of the protest, but Susan refuses to break it up. Marty is one of chaperones at the school dance, and he and Cherie explain to Pierce Greyson that the priority for the evening is not to let the students drink alcohol. Three years later, Marty participates in a protest against the closure of the school. After being interviewed on Summer Hoyland's podcast, Marty helps penetrate the school. When being escorted out, he accidentally knocks Melanie Pearson down the stairs.
17 September	Trevor Nugent	Warwick Sadler	A Lassiters Hotel porter, who trips over a suitcase placed behind him by Scarlett Brady, causing a back injury.
18 September 2019, 2 July 2020 – 2 December 2020	Ollie Sudekis	Ellmir Asipi	An Erinsborough High student who, along with his friends, is questioned by the police about a threatening note placed in Mackenzie Hargreaves' locker. Ollie insults students supporting Mackenzie's right to use the girls' toilet, but his friend Richie Amblin tells him to shut up and joins the protest. Mackenzie later realises that Ollie left the note and as he makes transphobic comments, Shane Rebecchi grabs him and pushes him up against a wall. The following year, Ollie attends Hendrix Greyson's party, where he goads Richie about Mackenzie's gender reassignment surgery.
19 September	Collette Sudekis	Sandra Casa	Ollie Sudekis' mother, who visits Shane Rebecchi to ask why he attacked her son. After hearing Shane's explanation about Ollie's transphobic comments, Collette and Shane talk with Susan Kennedy about Shane's apology and Ollie's punishment.
26 September	Nathaniel Besso	Sylph Hawkins	A man who runs a baby swaddling class for expectant fathers at the Erinsborough Community Centre. Nathaniel initially assumes Shaun Watkins, Finn Kelly, David Tanaka and Aaron Brennan are going to be raising a baby together, and Shaun says the others will be uncles to his child. Nathaniel later compliments Shaun's swaddling technique. He tells David and Aaron that their swaddle is too tight.
9 October	Charlie Waugh	Salim Fayad	A plumber, who informs Paul Robinson and Terese Willis that he found a hidden camera while he was servicing the hot water in one of their hotel rooms.
11 October	Donovan Ridley	Chris Palframan	A security guard who Paul Robinson and Terese Willis bring in to examine a hidden camera found in a hotel room. Donovan explains the camera can record onto an SD card or via Wi-Fi. As there is no card in it, Donovan checks the camera's transmitter and finds that it has been fried for some time, so no one can receive footage from it, though they may have at some point.
11 October – 8 November	Olivia Lane	Grace O'Sullivan	An Erinsborough High student and Lacy Lane's older sister. She attends a party at Lassiters Hotel, before going to the school dance. She and Hendrix Greyson flirt with each other in front of his date Mackenzie Hargreaves, and they are later caught kissing. Their teacher Marty Muggleton tells them to move apart, and Harlow Robinson tells Hendrix off for treating Mackenzie badly. Liv suggests she and Hendrix leave, while accusing Harlow of being jealous. The following month, Olivia talks to Yashvi Rebecchi about her unease around Finn Kelly living with Elly Conway and Susan Kennedy. She later trips and falls outside the school, and runs away when Finn offers to help her. Susan receives a phone call reporting that Olivia has gone missing. In Neighbours: Erinsborough High, Olivia is found, but it emerges that she has been in a relationship with teacher Cherie Reyner, who tries to force Olivia to keep quiet about it. Olivia later confesses to Yashvi, Marty and Angela, leaving all three disgusted. Angela assures Olivia she has done nothing wrong, while Cherie is subsequently arrested and fired.
16–30 October	Marianna Brookes	Amy Christian	A woman who throws a brick through the window of Number 32 Ramsay Street. She later meets with Scarlett Brady in the back yard to ask for her payment. Scarlett hands over some money and Marianna flees when Ned Willis emerges from the house. Marianna is later contacted by Paul Robinson and Terese Willis, who pay her to tell them what job she did for Scarlett.
25 October	VRC Representative	James Gunn	The Victoria Racing Club representative brings the Melbourne Cup trophy to Lassiters Hotel for a photo opportunity event. He later asks manager Terese Willis if they are on schedule and she tells him not to bring out the trophy they are ready to go, which he accepts.
30 October	Scott Mayfair	Tom Jackson	Scarlett Brady's former boyfriend, who is contacted by Yashvi Rebecchi. He messages her to say that Scarlett tried to kill him. Yashvi calls Scott and explains that she is worried for her friend who is dating Scarlett. Scott tells her that Scarlett cannot be trusted and that he almost did not make it back from a weekend away with her.
1 November	Aidan Townsend	Stephen Degenaro	One of four interviewers who meet with Amy Williams at The Waterhole to discuss her heading up a new building project. All four receive text messages at the same time, and Aidan tells Amy that he has just received a video and looks at her for an explanation. Amy realises that they have been sent footage of her having sex with her boyfriend and she withdraws her application.
13 November	Massimo Rossi	Ian Rooney	A former Lassiters Hotel guest, who attends a public meeting to discuss the issue of guests being filmed. He asks investor Pierce Greyson if Chloe Brennan is the manager responsible, but Pierce assures him that the former manager has been dismissed and charged by the police. Paul Robinson tries to convince Mr Rossi to sign up for a compensation payout, but Mr Rossi wants his lawyer to look over any settlement first. Paul eventually persuades him to sign the deal by telling him his lawyer will want a cut of the money, which will be in his account the following day.
22 November, 4 December	Judd Fincher	Harrison Luna	Ned Willis's opponent at the fight club. He punches Ned in the face and gets him in a headlock, but Ned manages to break free after elbowing Judd. They continue to exchange punches, but Ned repeatedly hits Judd until he falls to the floor. Aaron Brennan has to pull Ned off Judd as he keeps hitting him. Weeks later, Judd approaches Ned and tells him that no one leaves the fight club. When Ned asks what he is going to do about it, Judd threatens to harm Yashvi Rebecchi and Harlow Robinson. Judd later catches Yashvi filming one of the fights and he smashes her phone on the floor. She tells him to stay away from Ned, and as he backs her up against a wall, the police raid the club. In the UK broadcast of Episode 8240, the scenes in which Ned repeatedly punches Judd and forces him to the ground were censored by Channel 5.
2 December	Dr Wade D'Souza	David John Watton	Ned Willis's counsellor. Ned tells him he is angry because of his recent stabbing. Dr D'Souza suggests a mindfulness breathing technique.
3 December	Greta Hutchins	Tawni Bryant	Bea Nilsson's opponent at the fight club. As they square up to one another, Greta goads Bea and they fight. Greta punches Bea to the ground, before Ned Willis pulls Bea out of the fight.
6 December	Diamond La Rue	Jordyn Bartolo	A stripper who performs alongside Hugh Hammer at Chloe Brennan's hen's party.
9 December	Bus Driver	Luke Robson	The driver asks Pierce Greyson if he is alright, as he gets on the bus to speak with his son Hendrix Greyson. Hendrix later asks the driver how long to go before they depart.
24 December	Maya Preston	Hannah Ogawa	Jimmy Williams' girlfriend, who he hides at the Erinsborough Backpackers after flying her over to Australia. Maya tells Jimmy's mother Amy Williams that her father is violent towards her and she needed to escape. Amy talks with Maya's mother and arranges for Maya to fly home to New York to spend Christmas with her grandparents. Maya admits that she has been really scared, but Jimmy has been there for her. Amy assures Maya that she and Jimmy will fly out to check up on her, once her brother's kidney transplant is completed.
24 December	Dr Emma Bursill	Gabriella Rose-Carter	A doctor, who asks for Robert Robinson's handcuffs to be removed for surgery, before taking one of his guards to scrub up.
24 December	Hayden Partridge	Nathan James	One of two prison guards who escort Robert Robinson to Erinsborough Hospital, so he can donate a kidney. As his colleague goes to scrub up, Hayden removes Robert's handcuffs after checking he is sedated. Robert later grabs Hayden around the neck, wrestles him to the floor and chokes him until he is unconscious.
25 December 2019 – 10 July 2020, 26–28 December 2023	Aster Conway	Isla Goulas; Scout Bowman; Amelia Gavin	Elly Conway and Shaun Watkins's daughter, born while her mother is being held hostage by Robert Robinson. Elly names her Aster after Shaun's favourite flower. When Elly is jailed for the voluntary manslaughter of Shaun's brother Finn Kelly, she takes Aster into the prison with her, but after realising that it is not safe, she hands her over to her family. However, custody of Aster is later given to Shaun's mother Claudia Watkins, who then attempts to flee the country with her, until Shaun arrives. Elly and Aster are reunited when Elly is released, and they later move to Switzerland with Shaun. She returns to Erinsborough several years later for her mother's wedding to Chloe Brennan, for which she is the flower girl. After she tells Susan Kennedy that her grandmother, Liz Conway, has been neglecting her, Susan offers to stay with her in Sydney for the duration of Chloe and Elly's honeymoon.
30 December	Lara Thwaits	Kayla Jade LaManna	A woman who attends a New Year's Eve party at The Waterhole. Ned Willis notices her sitting alone and goes over to talk to her. As midnight passes, Ned leaves to reunite with his girlfriend and Hendrix Greyson comes over to flirt with Lara.
