= Andrea Somers =

Fictional character from the Australian soap opera Neighbours

- Neighbours character
- Portrayed by: Madeleine West
- Duration: 2017–2020
- First appearance: 20 January 2017
- Last appearance: 25 June 2020
- Introduced by: Jason Herbison
In-universe information
- Other names: Dee Bliss
- Occupation: Cleaner
- Father: Peter Wilson
- Mother: Heather Schilling
- Sisters: Dee Bliss
- Sons: Hugo Somers
- Daughters: Willow Somers

Andrea Somers is a fictional character from the Australian soap opera Neighbours, played by Madeleine West. West had previously played the role of Dee Bliss, who disappeared after a car crash into the ocean after marrying Toadie Rebecchi (Ryan Moloney). West originally reported that she was returning to Neighbours as Dee Bliss, but it was later revealed she was playing the conniving Andrea Somers, who comes to Erinsborough to scam Toadie by pretending to be Dee. West stated that returning to the sets was a homecoming for her and she was thrilled to be invited back to the cast. Andrea made her first appearance on 20 January 2017 and her first stint ended on 22 March. Andrea is initially credited as Dee Bliss and is depicted as calm, polite and charismatic. As her identity of Andrea Somers is revealed, her character increasingly becomes impatient, insecure, restless and easily agitated.

West returned to filming for a short stint at the end of 2017 and again in mid 2018. For these scenes, she was credited as neither Andrea Somers nor Dee Bliss, but as a special appearance, leading viewers to question whether it was really Dee. Andrea returns when Toadie discovers that he is the father of Andrea's son, Hugo (John Turner). Producers later introduced Andrea's mother, Heather Schilling (Kerry Armstrong), who was acting as a nanny for Toadie's children and in an attempt to unite Toadie and Andrea. Whilst in rehabilitation in 2019, Andrea gives full custody of Hugo to Toadie and tells Toadie's wife that a man approached her and called her Karen, suggesting that Dee is still alive.

West reprised the role of Dee Bliss later in 2019. Andrea manipulates the possibility of Dee being alive to try to get Toadie to fall for her. The storyline leads to a confrontation between Andrea and Dee. Andrea and Heather are sent to prison, but West once again returned as Andrea in 2020 in a storyline focusing on Andrea taking back her son. West finished filming in early 2020 and her final scenes as Andrea aired on 25 June.

== Creation ==
When producers approached West and proposed that she portrayed Andrea Somers, West did not hesitate to return. Although she had been asked to return multiple times, she previously could not due to family commitments. The creation of Andrea helped to close off all loose ends related to Dee's death. West loved the creation of the Andrea character, due to her complex and interesting story. West began filming in September 2016. Neighbours executive producer, Jason Herbison, explained, "We've wanted to bring Dee back for years but we had a big challenge – Harold Bishop. The fact is, the show has famously done a storyline where a beloved character disappeared at sea, only to return as the lovely mild-mannered person they always were. This presented us with a dilemma: do we do the same thing with Dee? Naturally there are all sorts of ways we could go to make it different and could still do in the future. However, we saw an opportunity to shock the audience and do something entirely different – and we opted for that path."

== Development ==
=== Characterisation ===
Andrea is impatient, insecure, restless and easily agitated – the opposite of Dee. West stated that Andrea's complex personality causes her to have strong motivations, which sometimes causes Andrea's heart to lead her the wrong direction. West stated that Andrea is "such a complicated character" and that she "really wanted to investigate why she is the way she is." She added, "This particular run of storylines has fleshed that out more than we had the opportunity to do before. I love Dee's softness, but I've played her for many years now. Andrea is such a fascinating character, who came into the show pretending to be Dee." West also said that Andrea is "certainly a nasty piece of work", as well as that Andrea is "trying to make her way in the world without much of a guide." Laura Denby of Radio Times also described Andrea as "cold and manipulative."

=== Backstory and scam ===
Whilst working at a mine site, Andrea Somers was recognised as Dee Bliss by Sindi Watts (Marisa Warrington), and together they planned to scam Toadie Rebecchi for Dee's money. Andrea and Sindi constructed Dee's survival story and Sindi poses as Dee's rescuer, Emily, over the phone. Using a sample from Toadie's daughter, Nell (Scarlett Anderson), they provide a DNA paternity test that convinces Toadie that Willow Somers (Mieke Billing-Smith) is his daughter. When Andrea takes Toadie's money, she flees to London with Willow, causing Toadie and Karl Kennedy (Alan Fletcher) to follow them. Channel 5 advertised it as "unmissable drama", while a Channel 5 commissioner stated, "This week promises another unmissable and dramatic series of events in Neighbours." In London, Andrea and Toadie have sex and Toadie's wife, Sonya Rebecchi (Eve Morey), watches it via Skype. Daniel Kilkelly of Digital Spy called it the "ultimate betrayal." When Toadie discovers that Andrea is not Dee, he leaves. Of the storyline in London, Moloney reported, "Of all my storylines over the years, Dee's disappearance is definitely one I'm most asked about, so it's great that we're able to add an international element to this latest chapter."

=== Family introductions ===
Part of Andrea's con, which involved a DNA test from Willow, was not initially revealed to viewers. Herbison said of Willow's introduction, "It's always a great dynamic when you have a child who's forced to parent an adult. She really was a leaf blown about in the breeze created by Andrea." Willow goes against Andrea multiple times, and runs away from London to try and escape Andrea. The following year, Sindi Watts returns to Ramsay Street and reveals that Toadie has a son named Hugo, whose mother is Andrea. Willow then explains the story of Hugo's birth to Toadie and Sonya. In 2018, Neighbours producers introduced Andrea's mother, Heather Schilling, played by Kerry Armstrong. Heather comes to Erinsborough as Alice Wells, a nanny for the Rebecchis. She tries to poison Sonya in an attempt to unite Andrea and Toadie. After Andrea is sent to prison in 2019, the real Dee suspects that she and Andrea are related, ultimately discovering that Dee and Andrea were twins, separated at birth, with Dee being adopted by the Bliss family and Andrea remaining in the care of Heather.

=== Returns ===
At the end of 2017, Andrea is seen watching over Toadie and Sonya renew their vows. For this scene and her upcoming appearances in 2018, West was not credited as either Andrea or Dee, but instead simply a guest appearance. McMullan of Digital Spy stated, "So, when 'Andrea' reappeared this month in a psychiatric hospital, eagle-eyed fans quickly spotted that Madeleine West was given a unique credit as "special appearance" without a character name. If this isn't a clue that Neighbours want us to think there's something amiss, we don't know what is." Additionally, he added, "What does it all mean? Either the Neighbours bosses are playing games with our hearts, or the real Dee is alive, but doomed to be accused of being Andrea Somers. Talk about a twist of fate." Sonya and Paul Robinson (Stefan Dennis) track down Andrea in a psychiatric hospital and Sonya confronts Andrea, who is once again claiming to be the real Dee. Morey reported that Andrea was going through post-natal depression, following the birth of Hugo.

In 2019, West again appeared as Andrea. Sonya confronts her in the psychiatric hospital and reveals that she has stage IV ovarian cancer. Andrea agrees to give full custody of Hugo to Toadie. Andrea tells Sonya that she was approached by a man who called her 'Karen', and speculates that Dee is still alive. Andrea and Dee eventually meet, and Andrea pushes Dee off a cliff. Andrea goes to Toadie's house one more time to try and con him, but the real Dee turns up and she is arrested. In 2020, Andrea escapes from prison with the help of prison guard Owen Campbell (Johnny Ruffo). Heather Schilling then helps Toadie get Hugo back, and Andrea is sent back to prison afterwards. Denby said, "Most recently, Andrea swapped places with Dee and snatched Hugo. This could have been a predictable twist, but quickly developed into a satisfying conclusion. The remorseful Heather, who had arguably caused even more damage than Andrea – earned a moment of redemption when she saved the day."

Of the multiple returns of West as Andrea, Herbison stated, "We are now well beyond what we originally planned and it’s the gift that keeps on giving". He also expressed his love for the character.

== Storylines ==
Andrea comes to Erinsborough pretending to be Dee Bliss. She tells Toadie Rebecchi (Ryan Moloney) that she got a brain injury in a car crash with him, but that she was found by a woman named Emily, who did not call for help, as she believed she was protecting her from Toadie. She explains that she saw him with Sindi Watts (Marisa Warrington) and did not want to ruin his happiness. Toadie asks to get a DNA test to prove her identity, but Andrea says they cannot ask Dee's sister, Cecile Bliss (Molly McCaffrey), for a sample, as she is dead. Mark later obtains a sample of Cecile's DNA and Andrea gives Mark a strand of hair, causing the DNA results to confirm that it belongs to Dee. Andrea tells Toadie that Willow Somers (Mieke Billing-Smith) is his daughter. Toadie's wife, Sonya Rebecchi (Eve Morey), asks for a paternity test and it comes back as positive. Andrea later explains to Willow that she replaced Willow's swab with one she took from Sonya and Toadie's daughter, Nell Rebecchi (Scarlett Anderson).

It emerges that Andrea wants the money from the Bliss family estate, and that Andrea and Sindi not only devised a plan for Andrea to act as Dee, but that Sindi posed as Emily over the phone. Sindi demands her initial cut of $20,000 be doubled to $40,000, but Andrea finds out that there is no more money left in the estate. Andrea tells Toadie that she has feelings for him and after Toadie gives Andrea a cheque for $100,000 for Willow's education, Andrea flees for London with Willow. Toadie follows them, leading to him and Andrea having sex. Toadie then finds Andrea's passport and she admits that she is not Dee. He rejects her and leaves. Willow attempts to convince Andrea to return the money, but she refuses. Months later, Andrea watches Toadie and Sonya renew their wedding vows.

A year later, Sindi tells Toadie that Andrea is in Perth. She then brings Andrea's son, Hugo Somers (John Turner), to Toadie's house and informs Toadie that he is Hugo's father. Willow explains that Andrea left Toadie a note asking him to visit her. Willow convinced Andrea not to tell Toadie. Andrea developed post-natal depression and left Hugo in Sindi's care. Sonya discovers that Andrea is in a psychiatric hospital, so she and Toadie take Willow and Hugo to visit Andrea, who fails to recognise either of them and claims to be Dee. Sonya and Toadie agree to pay for Andrea's ongoing treatment for Willow and Hugo's sake. Months later, Andrea's mother, Heather Schilling (Kelly Armstrong), visits her and she reveals that she has conned the Rebecchis into hiring her as their nanny, Alice Wells, so she can destroy their marriage, leaving Toadie free to be with Andrea. Andrea tells Toadie that she knows she is not Dee. Heather's scheme fails and she flees Erinsborough.

After Andrea sends a social worker to assess Sonya in the custody case for Hugo, Sonya visits her in the hospital and explains that she has ovarian cancer. Andrea signs over full custody of Hugo to Sonya and Toadie, in return for them dropping the fraud charges. Before Sonya leaves, Andrea tells her that while she was in the Salamanca Market, a man approached her thinking that she was a woman named Karen, who Andrea suspects could be the real Dee Bliss. Weeks later, Andrea receives a text message from Toadie's brother, Shane Rebecchi (Nicholas Coghlan). Andrea moves to Geelong, where Shane informs her of Sonya's death and asks her to explain the Karen story. Andrea explains that the man thought he had spent an afternoon with her. Andrea follows Shane back to Erinsborough, where she gets a cold reception from Toadie. She tells the Rebecchis that she will help them find Heather and Dee in exchange for time with Hugo. Andrea introduces Toadie to Ian Packer (Nathan Carter), who tells him that he met Dee years previously, now living under the name of "Karen". He tells them that Karen moved to South Africa, but this is a lie orchestrated by Andrea. She has sex with Ian in return for his part in her new con. Andrea finally comes face to face with the real Dee, after Heather tracks Dee down in Byron Bay. Andrea pushes Dee off a cliff and returns to Erinsborough to impersonate her again. Her attempt fails and she is arrested. After a DNA test, Andrea and Dee discover that they are twins and Heather is their biological mother. Andrea is sentenced to at least ten years imprisonment.

A year later, Andrea shares a cell with Elly Conway (Jodi Anasta). In return for protecting Elly from the other inmates, Andrea asks her to convince Toadie to contact Dee on her behalf. Andrea is secretly contacted by Claudia Watkins (Kate Raison), through her lawyer, Samantha Fitzgerald (Simone Buchanan), who pays her to start a prison riot to dissuade Elly from having her daughter, Aster Conway (Isla Goulas; Scout Bowman), in prison with her. Andrea reveals to Elly that she intends on taking advantage of Dee's kindness to regain custody of Hugo. Andrea and Elly's relationship sours when Elly leaves prison with custody of Aster and she tells Dee that Andrea cannot be trusted. In an attempt to reunite with Hugo, Andrea seduces Owen Campbell (Johnny Ruffo) into helping her impersonate Dee again. Owen drugs Dee, allowing Andrea to swap their clothes while Dee is unconscious. She flees with Hugo and Owen. However, Owen later confesses after Andrea rejects him and, with Heather's help, the police arrest Andrea. Dee visits Andrea for the last time before she leaves to find their father Peter Wilson in Alaska.

== Reception ==
Neighbours executive producer, Jason Herbison, stated of Andrea's initial storyline, "I'm thrilled with the reaction. When we announced that Madeleine was returning, we saw all sorts of viewer commentary – from those who wanted her to be Dee, to those who felt she couldn't possibly be. We knew we had a big opportunity, but that also meant we couldn't please absolutely everybody." He also added, "Our fans are very passionate and rightly so. I consider myself a fan too. The test for us is whether people watch and are being entertained – and we've had a great response to the storyline."

Daniel Kilkelly from Digital Spy said the storyline was the serial's "craziest and most convoluted storyline in its history." He stated, "Many fans have been gripped by the various shocks and surprises along the way, but it's fair to say that others are just plain confused." Kilkelly condensed the storyline into a "bizarre world of cash cons, faked DNA tests, doppelgangers, unstable nannies and mystery men." Although expressing his praise for Andrea's storyline, he also said, "With a new identity, mystery men and lookalikes all in the mix, it’s fair to say that many viewers are getting confused."

McMullan said that West's scenes as Andrea, "help us unravel one of soap's longest-running mysteries." Denby stated "Madeleine West and Ryan Moloney carried the story beautifully as their characters reminisced and reconnected." She also declared that Andrea's storyline could have been a "disaster", but instead was a "triumph." Denby claimed the initial "good versus bad twin" scenario, along with Andrea's birth, sounded like "the most bonkers soap plot" at first. Of Andrea pushing Dee of a cliff, Denby said, "What we had never seen before was one actress performing a showdown with herself – and keeping us on the edge of our seats!" Summarising the storyline, Denby declared, "Neighbours delivered their riskiest plot yet – and it was a total triumph." Andrea was placed at number fourteen on the Huffpost's "35 greatest Neighbours characters of all time" feature. Journalist Adam Beresford was a fan of Andrea's stories stating "this insanely OTT saga had it all and more. One of the most genuinely brilliant storylines of any soap, period."
