= Gay men =

Men attracted to other men

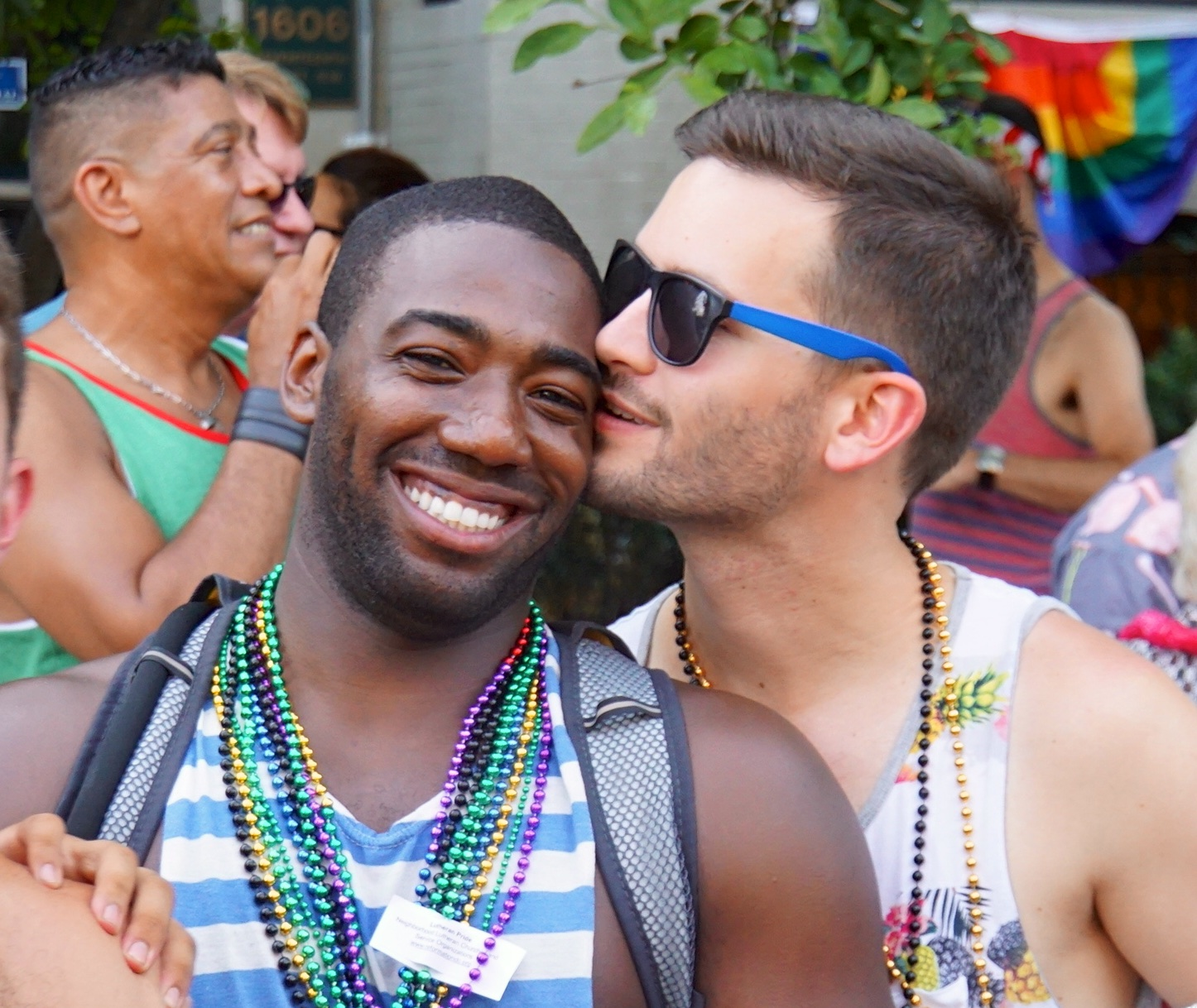
A gay couple at a pride event

Two interlocked Mars symbols representing male homosexuality.

Gay men are male homosexuals. Historic terminology for gay men has included inverts and uranians.

Gay men continue to face significant discrimination in large parts of the world, particularly in parts of Asia and Africa. In the Western world, many gay men still experience discrimination in their daily lives, though some openly gay men have reached national success and prominence, including Apple CEO Tim Cook and heads of state or government such as Edgars Rinkēvičs (President of Latvia since 2023) and Scott Bessent (United States Secretary of the Treasury since 2025).

The word gay is recommended by LGBTQ groups and style guides to describe all people exclusively attracted to members of the same sex, while lesbian refers specifically to female homosexuals, and gay men to male homosexuals.

== Male homosexuality in world history ==
Some scholars argue that the terms "homosexual" and "gay" are problematic when applied to men in ancient cultures since, for example, neither Greeks nor Romans possessed any one word covering the same semantic range as the modern concept of "homosexuality". Furthermore, there were diverse sexual practices that varied in acceptance depending on time and place. Other scholars argue that there are significant similarities between ancient and modern male homosexuals.

In cultures influenced by Abrahamic religions, the law and the church established sodomy as a transgression against divine law or a crime against nature. The condemnation of anal sex between males, however, predates Christian belief. Throughout the majority of Christian history, most Christian theologians and denominations have considered homosexual behavior as immoral or sinful. Condemnation existed in ancient Greece; for instance Plato, in his Laws, described male homosexuality as 'unnatural' and argued for its prohibition.

Many historical figures, including Socrates, Lord Byron, Edward II, and Hadrian, have had terms such as gay or bisexual applied to them. Some scholars, such as Michel Foucault, have regarded this as risking the anachronistic introduction of a contemporary construction of sexuality foreign to their times, though other scholars challenge this.

=== Africa ===
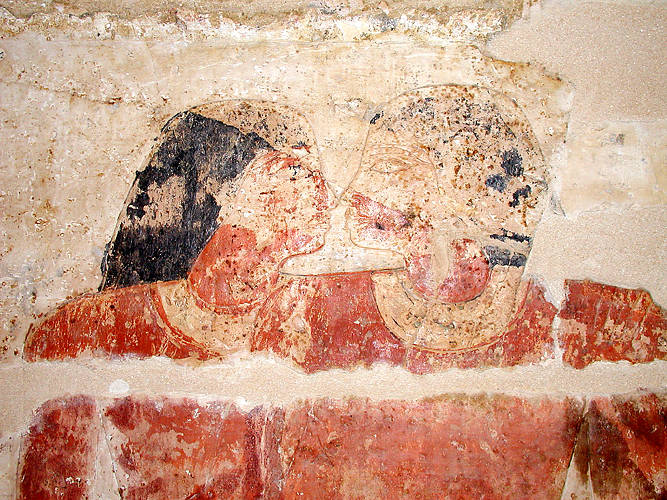
Khnumhotep and Niankhkhnum nose-kissing

The first recorded possible homosexual male couple in history is commonly deemed to be Khnumhotep and Niankhkhnum, an ancient Egyptian couple, who lived around 2400 BCE. The pair are portrayed in a nose-kissing position, the most intimate pose in Egyptian art, surrounded by what appear to be their heirs. The 6th- or 7th-century Ashmolean Parchment AN 1981.940 provides the only example in the Coptic language of a love spell between men. More recently, the European colonization of Africa resulted in the introduction of anti-sodomy laws, and is generally regarded as the central reason why African nations have such stringent laws against gay men today. Three countries or jurisdictions have imposed the death penalty for gay men in Africa. These include Mauritania and several regions in Nigeria and Jubaland.

=== Americas ===
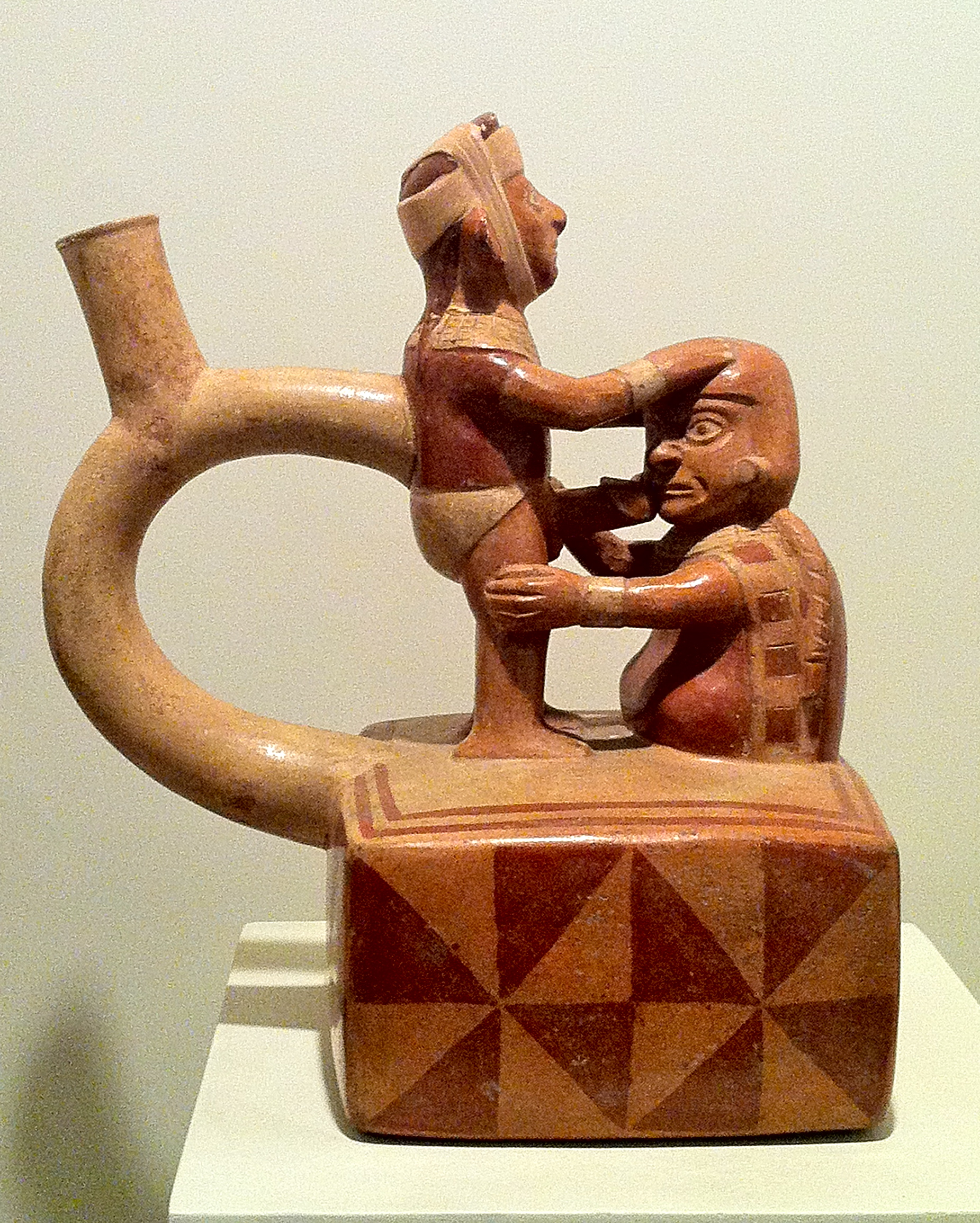
Pre-Columbian ceramic of oral sex

As is true of many other non-Western cultures, it is difficult to determine the extent to which Western notions of sexual orientation apply to Pre-Columbian cultures. Evidence of homoerotic sexual acts between men has been found in many pre-conquest civilizations in Latin America, such as the Aztecs, Mayas, Quechuas, Moches, Zapotecs, the Incas, and the Tupinambá of Brazil. In fact, in Aztec mythology, the deity Xochipilli was a symbol of gay men and male prostitutes.

The Spanish conquistadors expressed horror at discovering sodomy openly practiced among native men and used it as evidence of their supposed inferiority. The conquistadors talked extensively of sodomy among the natives to depict them as savages and hence justify their conquest and forced conversion to Christianity. As a result of the growing influence and power of the conquistadors, many Native leaders started condemning homosexual acts themselves. During the period following European colonization, homosexuality was prosecuted by the Inquisition, sometimes leading to death sentences on the charges of sodomy, and the practices became clandestine. Many homosexual men went into heterosexual marriages to keep appearances, and some turned to the clergy to escape public scrutiny.

During the Mexican Inquisition, after a series of denunciations, authorities arrested 123 men in 1658 on suspicion of homosexuality. Although many escaped, the Royal Criminal Court sentenced fourteen men from different social and ethnic backgrounds to death by public burning, in accordance to the law passed by Isabella the Catholic in 1497. The sentences were carried out together on one day, 6 November 1658. The records of these trials and those that occurred in 1660, 1673 and 1687, suggest that Mexico City, like many other large cities at the time had an active underworld.

=== East Asia ===
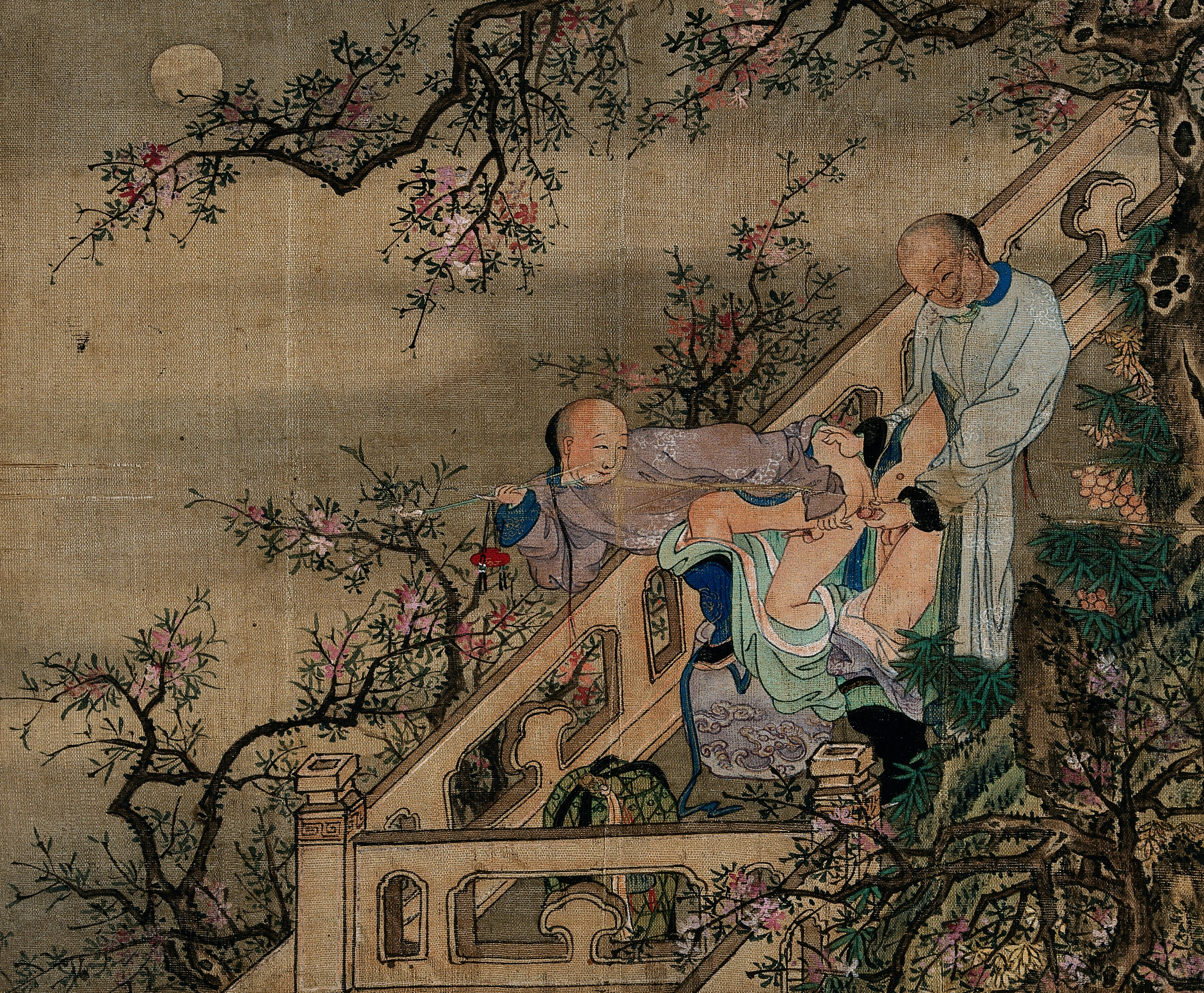
Two young men about to have anal sex. Qing China, date unknown.

In East Asia, same-sex relations between men has been noted since the earliest recorded history. Homosexuality in China, known as the passions of the cut peach and various other euphemisms, has been recorded since approximately 600 BCE. Male homosexuality was mentioned in many famous works of Chinese literature. The instances of same-sex affection and sexual interactions described in the classical novel Dream of the Red Chamber seem as familiar to observers in the present as do equivalent stories of romances between heterosexual people during the same period. Confucianism, being primarily a social and political philosophy, focused little on sexuality, whether homosexual or heterosexual. Ming dynasty literature, such as Bian Er Chai (弁而釵/弁而钗), portray homosexual relationships between men as more enjoyable and more "harmonious" than heterosexual relationships. Writings from the Liu Song dynasty by Wang Shunu claimed that homosexuality was as common as heterosexuality in the late 3rd century China. Opposition to male homosexuality in China originates in the medieval Tang dynasty (618–907), attributed to the rising influence of Christian and Islamic values, but did not become fully established until the Westernization efforts of the late Qing dynasty and the Republic of China.

=== Europe ===
==== Classical period ====
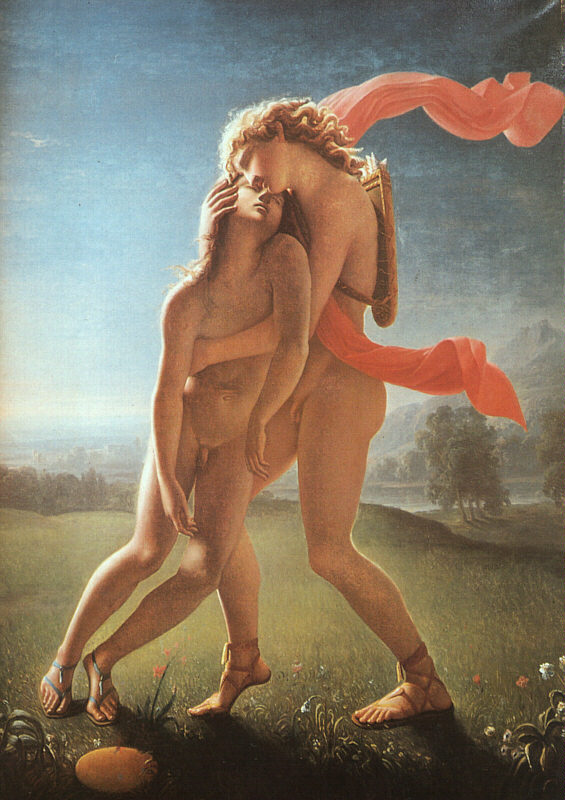
The Death of Hyacinthos by Jean Broc (1801)

The earliest Western documents (in the form of literary works, art objects, and mythographic materials) concerning same-sex male relationships are derived from ancient Greece. Certain city-states prohibited it while others were ambiguous or allowed it. In Athens, laws were eventually enacted to curb pederasty and homosexuality in general, but not prohibit every instance of it.

In Ancient Rome, male homosexuality is documented through pederasty, but male sexual passivity was criticized; pederastic attentions were considered legitimate only if it is directed towards current or former slaves. The Hellenophile emperor Hadrian is renowned for his relationship with Antinous, but the Christian emperor Theodosius I decreed a law on 6 August 390, condemning passive males to be burned at the stake. In 558 C.E., The Emperor Justinian expanded the proscription to the active partner as well, warning that such conduct can lead to the destruction of cities through the "wrath of God"

Some scholars argue that there are examples of male homosexual love in ancient literature, such as Achilles and Patroclus in the Iliad.

==== Renaissance ====
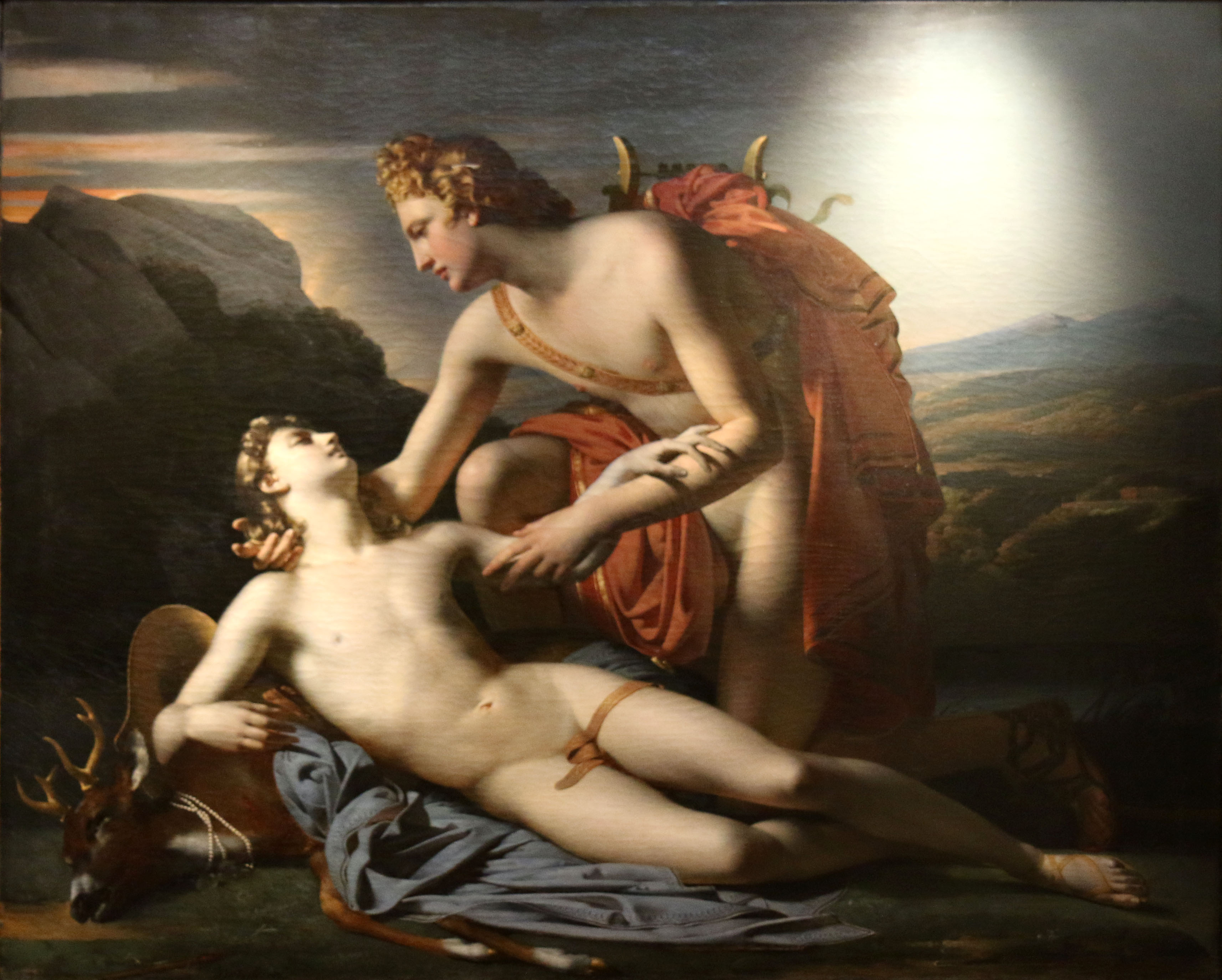
Apollon et Cyparisse by Claude Marie Dubufe, 1821

During the Renaissance, wealthy cities in northern Italy—Florence and Venice in particular—were renowned for their widespread practice of same-sex love, engaged in by a considerable part of the male population and constructed along the classical pattern of Greece and Rome. But even as many of the male population were engaging in same-sex relationships, the authorities, under the aegis of the Officers of the Night court, were prosecuting, fining, and imprisoning a good portion of that population. From the second half of the 13th century, death was the punishment for male homosexuality in most of Europe. The relationships of socially prominent figures, such as King James I and the Duke of Buckingham, served to highlight the issue, including in anonymously authored street pamphlets: "The world is chang'd I know not how, For men Kiss Men, not Women now; ... Of J. the First and Buckingham: He, true it is, his Wives Embraces fled, To slabber his lov'd Ganimede" (Mundus Foppensis, or The Fop Display'd, 1691).

=== Middle East ===
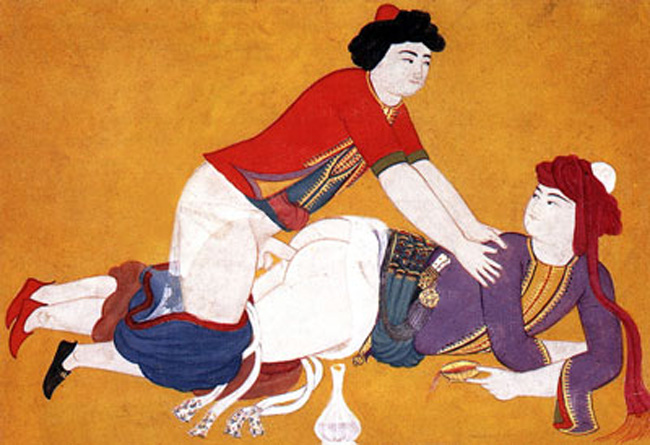
An illustration from the 19th-century book Sawaqub al-Manaquib depicting homosexual sex between young men (see: Gender and sexual minorities in the Ottoman Empire)

In ancient Sumer, a set of priests known as gala worked in the temples of the goddess Inanna, where they performed elegies and lamentations. Gala took female names, spoke in the eme-sal dialect, which was traditionally reserved for women, and appear to have engaged in homosexual intercourse. The Sumerian sign for gala was a ligature of the signs for "penis" and "anus". One Sumerian proverb reads: "When the gala wiped off his ass [he said], 'I must not arouse that which belongs to my mistress [i.e., Inanna].'" In later Mesopotamian cultures, kurgarrū and assinnu were male servants of the goddess Ishtar (Inanna's East Semitic equivalent), who dressed in female clothing and performed war dances in Ishtar's temples. Several Akkadian proverbs seem to suggest that they may have also engaged in homosexual intercourse. In ancient Assyria, male homosexuality is documented. It is thought that ancient Assyria (2nd millennium BC to 1st millennium AD) viewed homosexuality as negative and at least criminal, with the religious codes of Zoroastrianism forbidding homosexuality. Some religious texts contain prayers for divine blessings on homosexual relationships. The Almanac of Incantations contained prayers favoring on an equal basis the love of a man for a woman, of a woman for a man, and of a man for man.

== Gay men in modern Western history ==
The use of gay to mean a "homosexual" man was first used as an extension of its application to prostitution: a gay boy was a young man or adolescent serving male clients. Similarly, a gay cat was a young man apprenticed to an older hobo and commonly exchanging sex and other services for protection and tutelage. The application to homosexuality was also an extension of the word's sexualized connotation of "uninhibited", which implied a willingness to disregard conventional sexual mores. In court in 1889, the prostitute John Saul stated: "I occasionally do odd-jobs for different gay people."

Bringing Up Baby (1938) was the first film to use the word gay in an apparent reference to homosexuality. In a scene in which Cary Grant's character's clothes have been sent to the cleaners, he is forced to wear a woman's feather-trimmed robe. When another character asks about his robe, he responds, "Because I just went gay all of a sudden!" Since this was a mainstream film at a time, when the use of the word to refer to cross-dressing (and, by extension, homosexuality) would still be unfamiliar to most film-goers, the line can also be interpreted to mean, "I just decided to do something frivolous."

In 1950, the earliest reference found to date for the word gay as a self-described name for male homosexuals came from Alfred A. Gross, executive secretary for the George W. Henry Foundation, who said in the June 1950 issue of Sir magazine: "I have yet to meet a happy homosexual. They have a way of describing themselves as gay, but the term is a misnomer. Those who are habitues of the bars frequented by others of the kind, are about the saddest people I've ever seen."

=== Gay men in the Holocaust ===
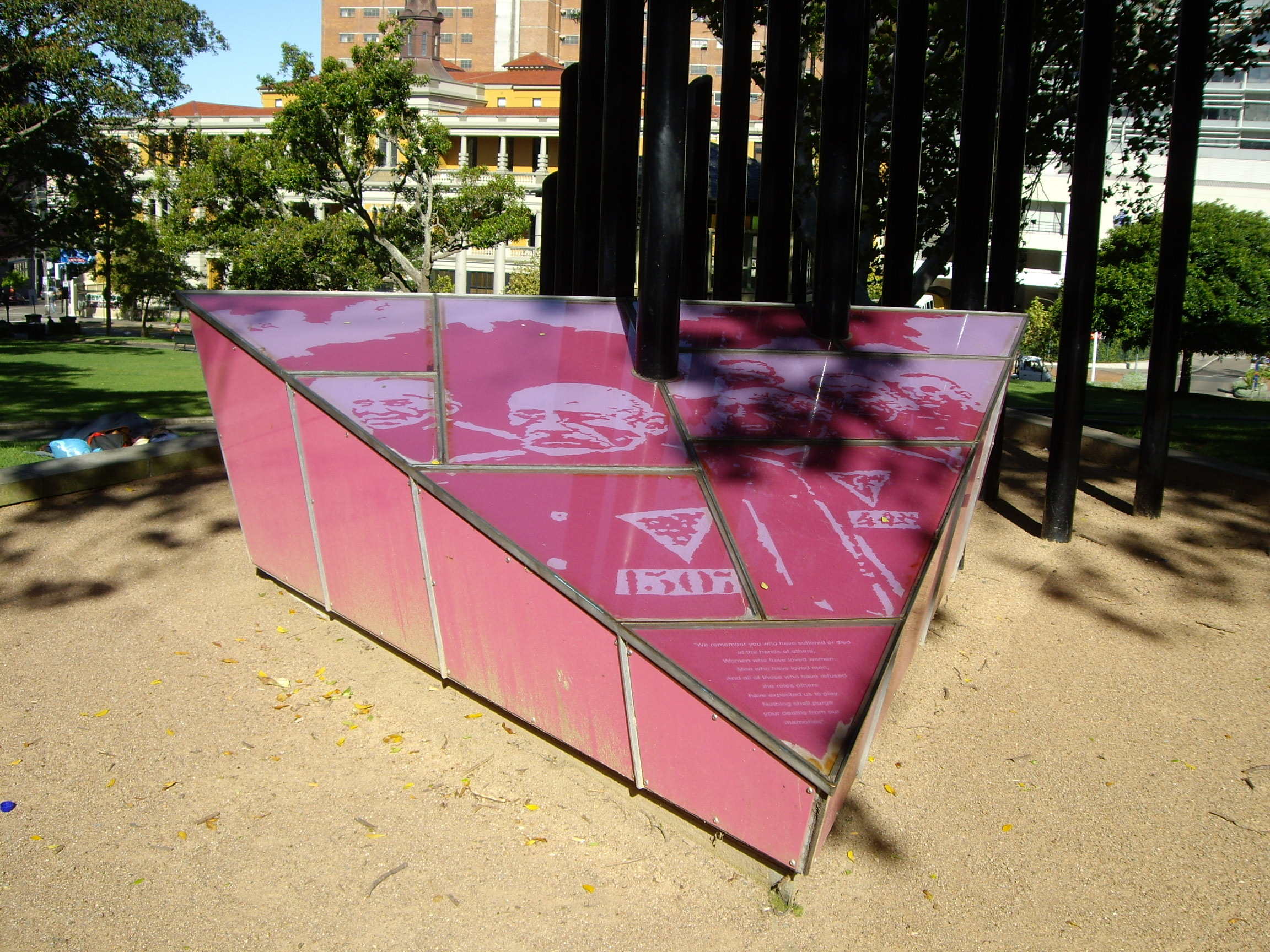
A pink triangle was worn by gay men during the Holocaust.

Gay men were one of the primary victims of the Nazi Holocaust. Historically, the earliest legal step towards the Nazi persecution of male homosexuality was 1871's Paragraph 175, a law passed after the unification of the German Empire. Paragraph 175 read: "An unnatural sex act committed between persons of male sex ... is punishable by imprisonment; the loss of civil rights might also be imposed." The law was interpreted in varying ways in Germany until 23 April 1880, when the Reichsgericht ruled that criminal homosexual acts involved either anal, oral, or intercrural sex between two men. Anything less (such as kissing and cuddling) was deemed harmless play.

Franz Gürtner, the Reich Justice Minister amended Paragraph 175 to address "loopholes" in the law after the Night of the Long Knives. The 1935 version of Paragraph 175 declared "expressions" of homosexuality as prosecutable crimes. The most important change to the law was the definitional shift of male homosexuality from "An unnatural sex act committed between persons of male sex" to instead "A male who commits a sex offense with another male." This expanded the reach of the law to persecute gay men as a people group, rather than male homosexuality as a sexual act. Kissing, mutual masturbation and love-letters between men were now seen as legitimate reasons for the police to make arrests. The law never defined a "sex offence", leaving it to interpretation.

Between 1933 and 1945, an estimated 100,000 men were arrested as homosexuals under the Nazi regime, of whom some 50,000 were officially sentenced. Most of these men served time in prison, while an estimated 5,000 to 15,000 were incarcerated in Nazi concentration camps. Rüdiger Lautmann found that the death rate of homosexuals in concentration camps may have been as high as 60%. Gay men in the camps suffered an unusual degree of cruelty by their captors and were regularly used as the subjects for Nazi medical experiments as scientists tried to find a "cure" for homosexuality.

=== AIDS crisis in the United States ===
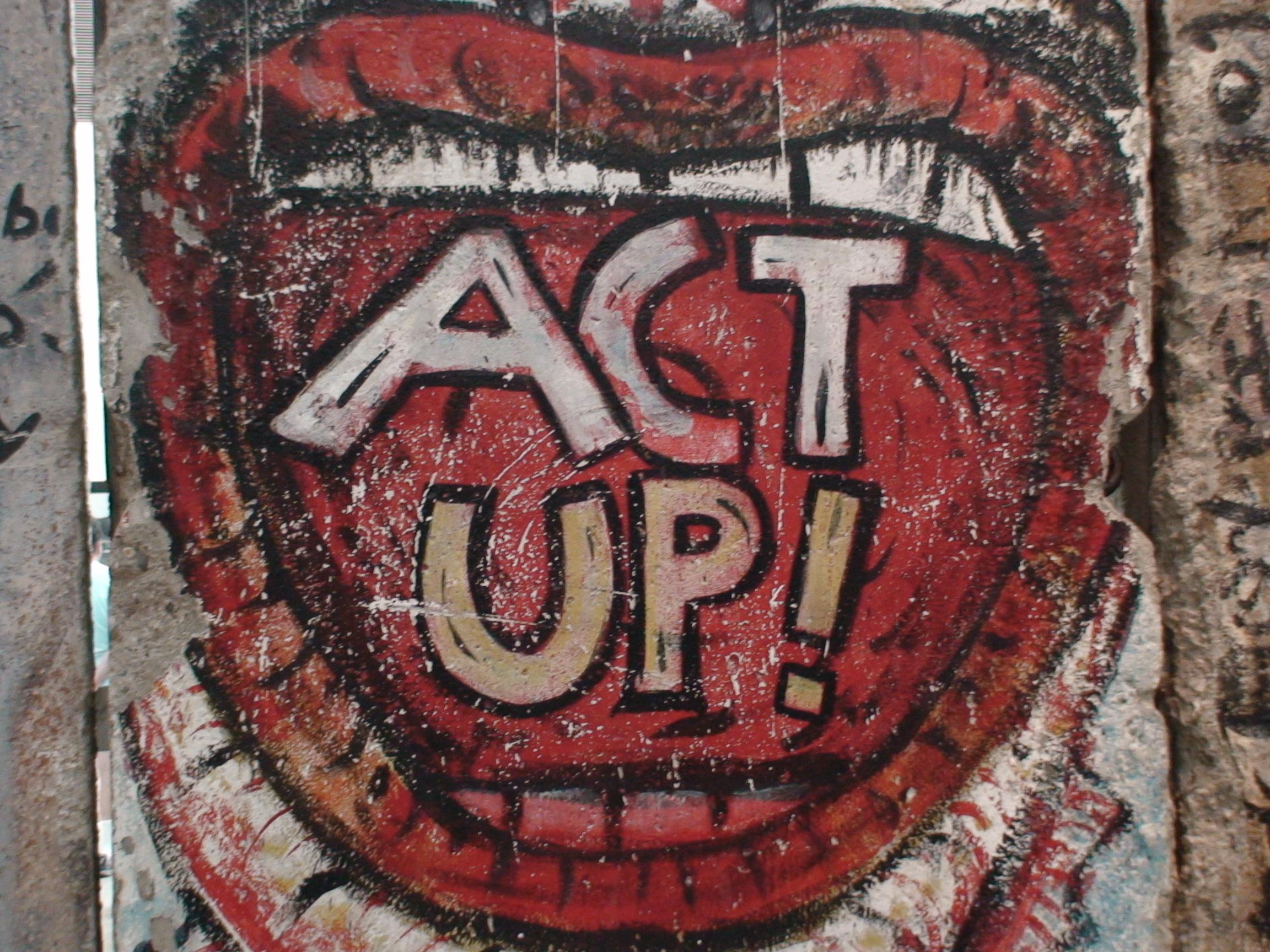
ACT UP was founded by Larry Kramer to fight for medical funding and research on the HIV/AIDS crisis.

The HIV/AIDS epidemic is considered the deadliest period in modern history for gay men, and the generation of young gay men who died in the crisis is known as the "lost generation". At its start, the epidemic was particularly severe in the United States. In 1980, San Francisco resident Ken Horne was reported to the CDC with Kaposi's sarcoma (KS). He was retroactively identified as the first patient of the AIDS epidemic in the US. In 1981, Lawrence Mass became the first journalist in the world to write about the epidemic in the New York Native. Later that year, the CDC reported a cluster of Pneumocystis pneumonia in five gay men in Los Angeles. The next month, The New York Times ran the headline: "Rare Cancer Seen in 41 Homosexuals". The illness was soon termed Gay Related Immunodeficiency (G.R.I.D.), because it was believed to only affect gay men. In June 1982, Larry Kramer founded the Gay Men's Health Crisis to provide food and support to gay men dying in New York City. During the early years of the AIDS crisis, gay men were treated pitilessly in hospital quarantine wards, left alone without contact for weeks at a time.

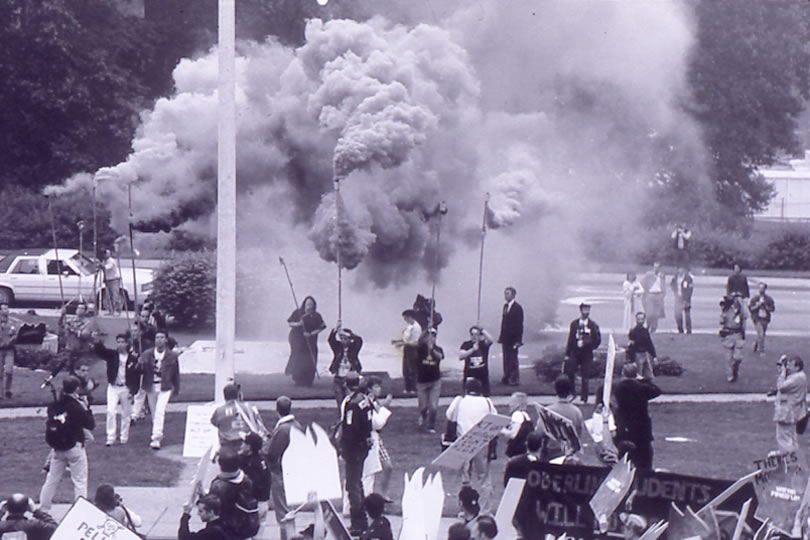
1990 ACT UP radical direct action protesting the Bush Administration's slow pace of federal research for AIDS

During the early years of the epidemic, there was significant misinformation surrounding the illness. Rumors swirled that being in the same room or being touched by a gay man could lead one to contract HIV. It was not until April 1984 that the U.S. Health and Human Services Secretary Margaret Heckler announced in a press conference that the American scientist Robert Gallo had discovered the probable cause of AIDS, the retrovirus which would be named human immunodeficiency virus or HIV. In September 1985, during his second term in office, US President Ronald Reagan publicly mentioned AIDS for the first time after being asked about his administration's lack of medical research funding for the crisis. Four months later, Anthony Fauci, the director of the National Institute of Allergy and Infectious Diseases, stated, "One million Americans have already been infected with the virus and that this number will jump to at least 2 million or 3 million within 5 to 10 years." Gay men, trans women, and bisexual men faced the brunt of deaths during the first decade of the crisis. Activists claimed the government was responding to the epidemic with apathy because of the perceived "social undesirability" of these groups. To address this perceived apathy, activists such as Vito Russo, Larry Kramer, and others, took more militant approaches to AIDS activism, organizing direct action through organizations like ACT UP to force pharmaceutical corporations and government agencies to respond to the epidemic with more urgency. ACT UP eventually grew into a transnational organization, with 140 chapters around the world, while the AIDS crisis ultimately became a global epidemic. By 2019, complications related to AIDS had taken 32.7 million lives worldwide.

== Legal status of gay men in modern society ==
=== Africa ===
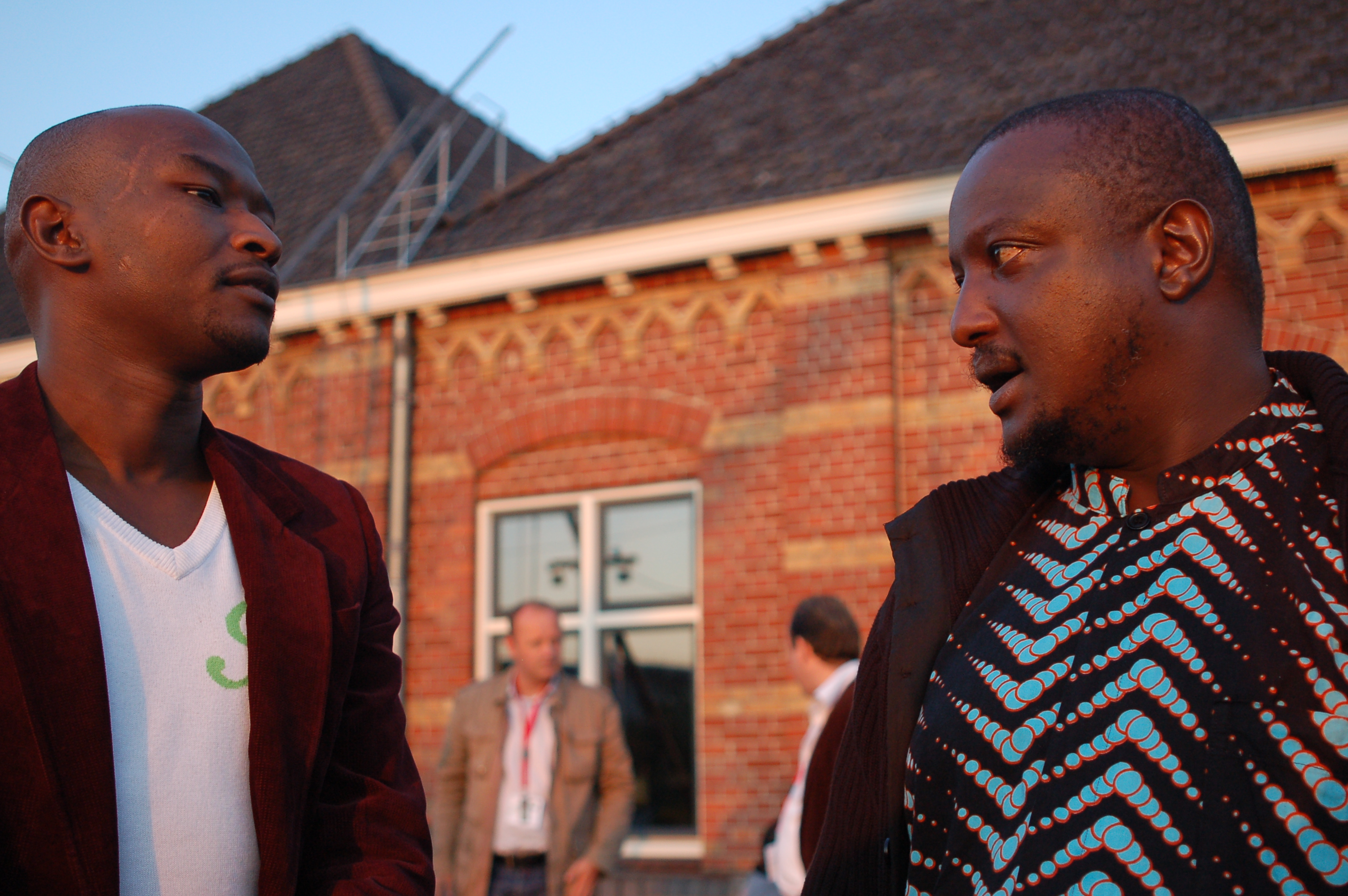
Binyavanga Wainaina (right), a Kenyan writer, who came out in 2014 in response to a wave of anti-gay laws in Africa

There are 54 nations in Africa recognized by the United Nations and/or African Union. In 34 of these states, male homosexuality is explicitly outlawed. In a 2015 report, Human Rights Watch noted that in Benin and the Central African Republic, male homosexuality is not explicitly outlawed, but both have laws which are applied differently for gay men than for straight men. In Mauritania, northern Nigeria, Somaliland, and Somalia, male homosexuality is punishable by death. In Sierra Leone, Tanzania, and Uganda, gay men receive life imprisonment for homosexual acts, though the law is not regularly enforced in Sierra Leone. In Nigeria, legislation has also made it illegal for family members, allies, and friends of gay men to openly express support for homosexuality, and the country is generally recognized for its "cold-blooded" attitudes toward gay men. Nigerian law states that any heterosexual person "who administers, witnesses, abets or aids" male homosexual activity should receive a 10-year jail sentence. In Uganda, Christian fundamentalist organizations from the United States funded the introduction of Kill the Gays legislation to impose the death penalty for gay men. The bill was ruled unconstitutional by the Ugandan Supreme Court in 2014, but retains support in the country and has been reconsidered for implementation. Of all countries in Sub-Saharan Africa, South Africa has the most liberal attitudes toward gay men. In 2006, South Africa became the fifth country in the world to legalize same-sex marriage, and the Constitution of South Africa guarantees gay men and lesbians full equal rights and protections. South Africa is the only country in Africa where LGBTQ discrimination is constitutionally forbidden; however, social discrimination against South African gay men persists in rural parts of the country, where high levels of religious tradition continue to fuel prejudice and violence.

=== Caribbean ===
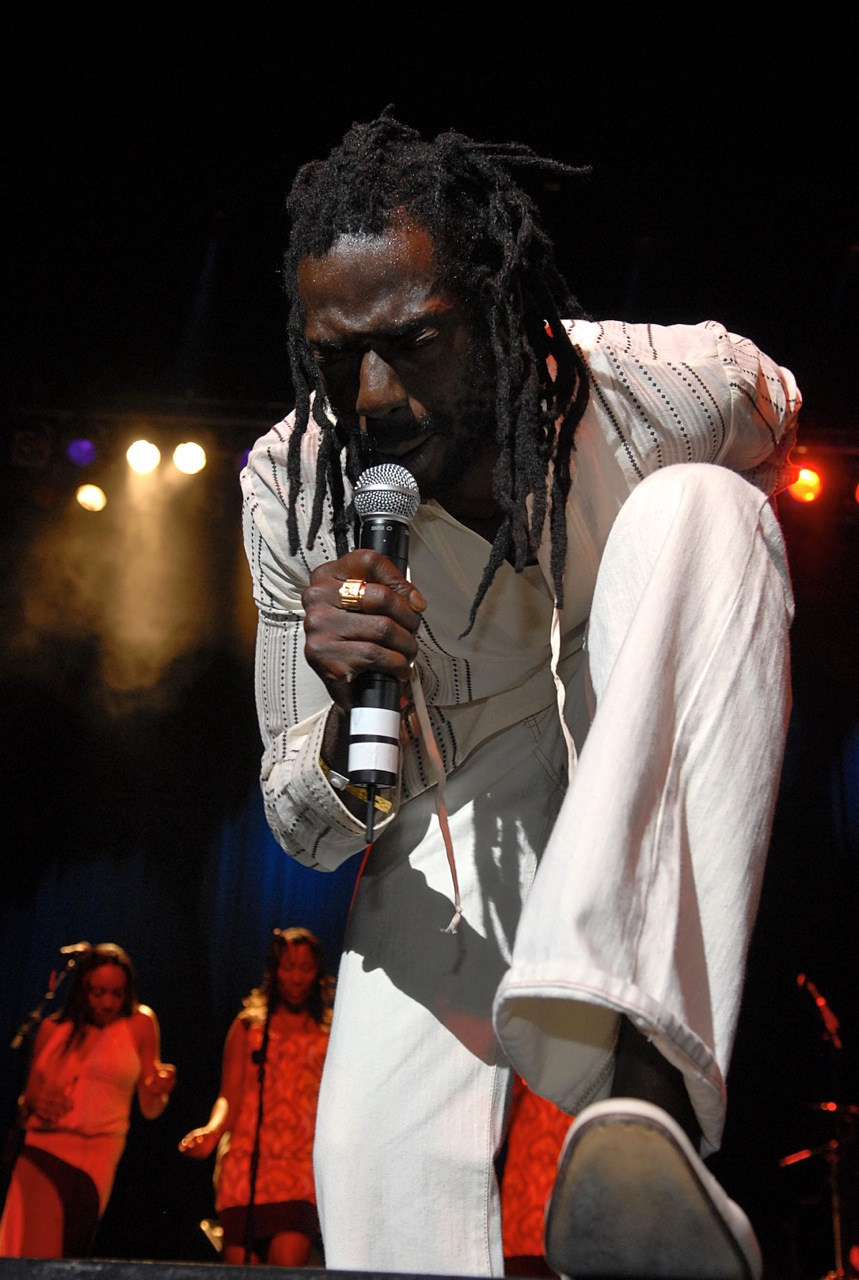
Jamaican rapper Buju Banton has been criticized for violently homophobic messages in his music (see: Stop Murder Music).

In the mainland Americas (both North and South), male homosexuality is legal in every country (except Guyana). In the Caribbean, however, nine nations have criminal punishment for "buggery" on their statute books. These countries include Barbados, Saint Vincent and the Grenadines, Dominica, Saint Kitts and Nevis, Grenada, Saint Lucia, Antigua and Barbuda, Guyana, and Jamaica. In Jamaica, sexual intercourse between men is legally punishable by imprisonment, though the law's repeal is pending. Sexual intercourse between women is already legal, though lesbians in Jamaica still experience a high level of social stigma.

In Jamaica, reports of vigilante violence and torture against gay men have been reported by the Jamaican police. In 2013, Amnesty International reported that "Gay men and lesbian women have been beaten, cut, burned, raped and shot on account of their sexuality. ... We are concerned that these reports are just the tip of the iceberg. Many gay men and women in Jamaica are too afraid to go to the authorities and seek help". As a result of this violence, hundreds of gay men from Jamaica sought to emigrate to countries with better human rights records. A 2016 poll from J-Flag showed that 88 percent of those polled disapprove of homosexuality, though since 2018, discriminatory attitudes have decreased slightly.

In the Caribbean, like in other developing countries around the world, homosexual identity is often associated with Westernization, and as a result, homophobia is believed to be an anti-colonial tool. Wayne Marshall wrote that gay men are believed to be "decadent products of the West" and "are thus to be resisted alongside other forms of colonization, cultural or political". Wayne cites the example of the Jamaican dancehall hit "Dem Bow" by Shabba Ranks, which calls for the violent murder of gay men alongside a call for the "freedom for Black people". Marshall notes the irony of this ideological position, considering the historical evidence that homophobia was introduced to colonies by European colonists. Nevertheless, Caribbean scholars have noted the importance of opposition to gay men for Jamaican male gender construction. Kingsley Ragashanti Stewart, a professor of anthropology at the University of the West Indies, writes, "A lot of Jamaican men, if you call them a homosexual, ... will immediately get violent. It's the worst insult you could give to a Jamaican man." Stewart writes that homophobia influences Caribbean society even at the micro level of language. He writes of urban youth vernacular, "It's like if you say, 'Come back here,' they will say, 'No, no, no don't say "come back".' You have to say, 'come forward,' because come back is implying that you're 'coming in the back,' which is how gay men have sex."

=== Eastern Europe ===
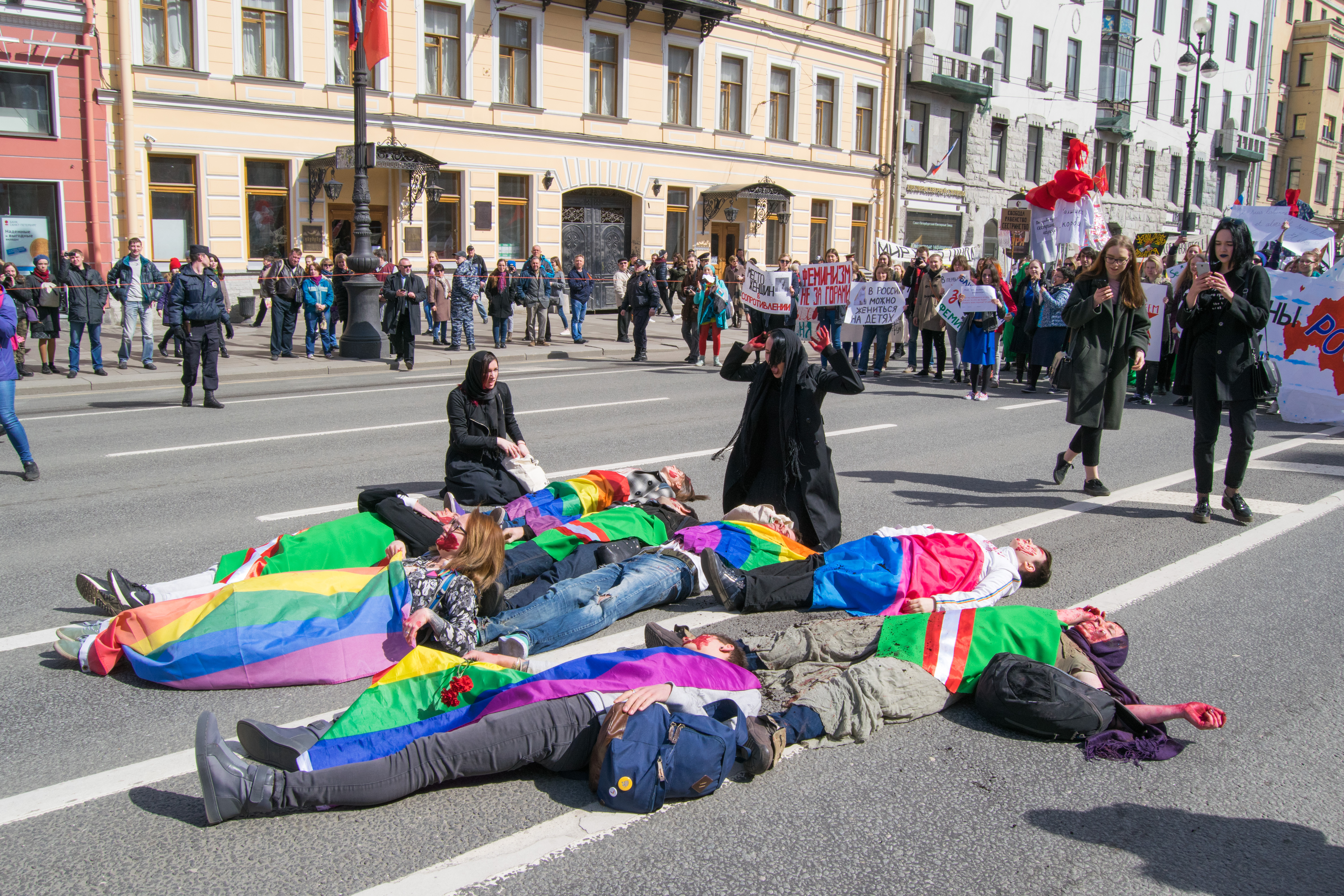
Activists enact a scene of Chechen mothers mourning their disappeared sons, draped in LGBT and Chechen flags

In Eastern Europe, there has been a steady erosion of rights for gay men over the course of the last decade. In the Russian republic of Chechnya, gay men have been subjected to forced disappearances—secret abductions, imprisonment, torture—and extrajudicial killing by authorities. An unknown number of men, detained due to suspicion of them being gay or bisexual, have died while held in concentration camps. Independent media and human rights groups have reported that gay men are being sent to clandestine camps in Chechnya, described by one eyewitness as "closed prison, the existence of which no one officially knows". Some gay men have attempted to flee the region, but have been detained by Russian police and sent back to Chechnya. Reports have emerged of prison officials releasing accused gay men from the camps after securing assurances from their families that their families will kill them (at least one man was reported by a witness as having died after returning to his family). These imprisoned men are kept in extremely cramped conditions, with 30 to 40 people detained in one room (two to three metres big), and few are afforded a trial. Witnesses have also reported that the gay men are regularly beaten (with polypropylene pipes below the waist), tortured with electricity, and spat in the face by prison guards. In some cases the process of torture has resulted in the death of the person being tortured. As of 2021, the situation in Chechnya continues to worsen for gay men. In other countries in Eastern Europe, rights for gay men continue to deteriorate. Polish President Andrzej Duda has pledged to ban teaching about gay men in schools, forbid same-sex marriage and adoption, and establish "LGBT-free zones".

A 2017 Pew Research Center poll found that the majority of Orthodox Christians in the Eastern European and former USSR states surveyed believe that homosexuality "should not be accepted by society"; 45% of Orthodox Christians in Greece and 31% in the United States answered the same way.

=== Southwest Asia and North Africa ===
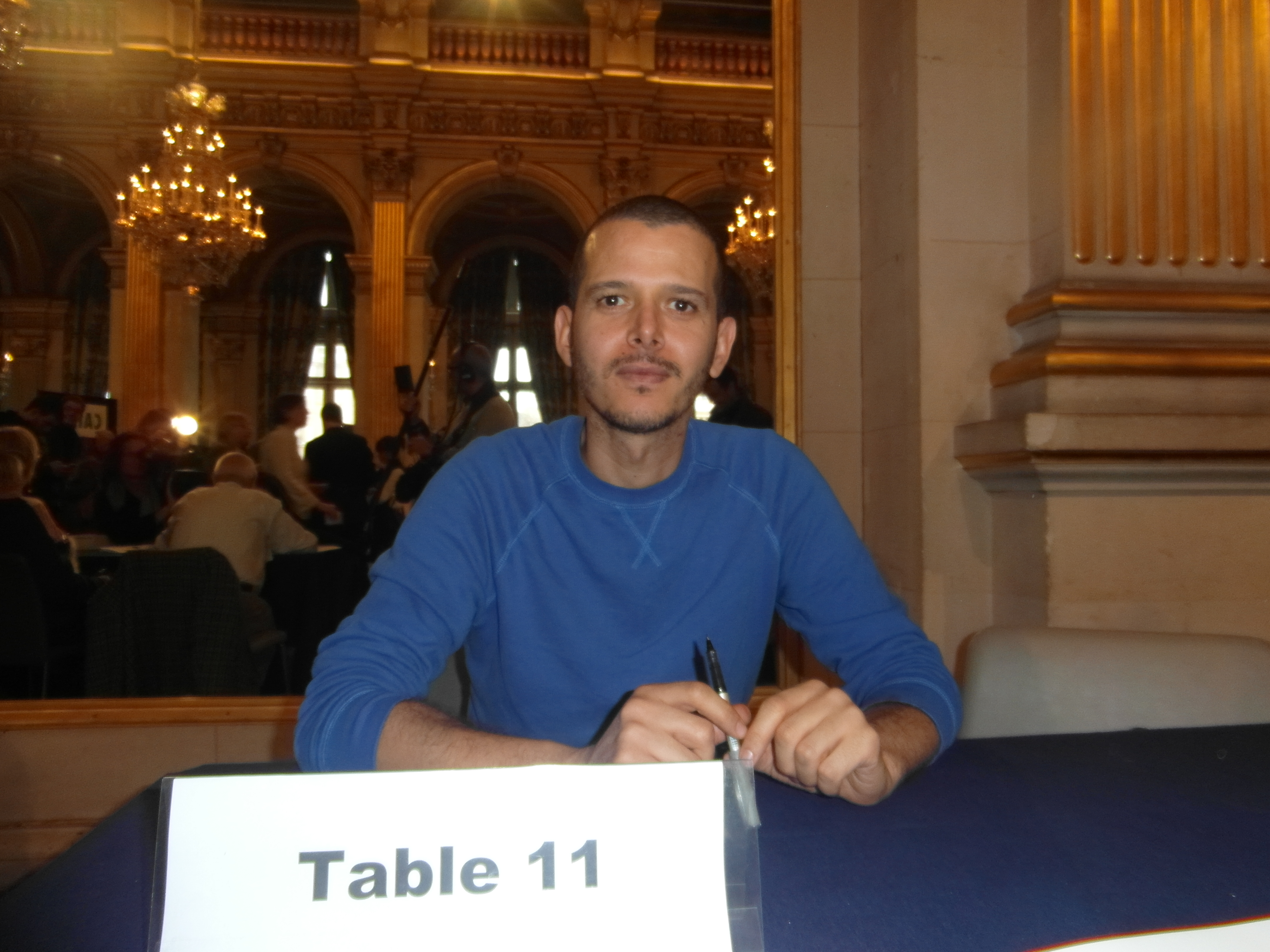
Abdellah Taïa has written about the abuse he suffered as a gay child in Morocco.

In Southwest Asia and North Africa, gay men face some of the harshest and most hostile laws anywhere in the world. Sex between men is explicitly outlawed in 10 of the 18 "Middle Eastern" countries and is punishable by death in six. According to scholars, recent popular turns toward Islamic fundamentalism has strongly influenced the extreme violence against gay men. While all same-sex activity is legal in Bahrain, Cyprus, the West Bank, Turkey, Lebanon, Israel, Jordan, and Iraq, male homosexuality is illegal and punishable by imprisonment in Syria, Oman, Qatar, Kuwait, and Egypt. Israel is the most progressive concerning LGBTQ rights and recognizing unregistered cohabitation; however, it has faced criticism from academics such as Sarah Schulman and Jason Ritchie for "pinkwashing". And although same-sex marriage is not legal in the country, there is public support for recognizing and registering same-sex marriages performed in other countries.

Male same-sex activity is also punishable by death in the UAE, Saudi Arabia, Iran, and Qatar. In the Gaza Strip and Yemen, punishment for male homosexuality varies between death and imprisonment depending on the act committed. In 2018, a transnational survey conducted in the region by Pew Research Center found that 80% of people polled believed homosexuality was "morally unacceptable", though others argue that the true number of people who support rights for gay men is unclear due to fear of backlash and punishment.

== Art and culture ==
=== High fashion ===
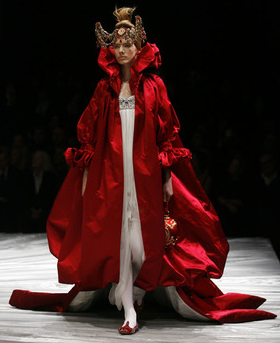
McQueen, Fall 2008

Since the early 20th century, gay men, both out and closeted, have worked as some of the world's most influential fashion designers and started some of the most important fashion houses. Cristóbal Balenciaga (b. 1895), who started the Balenciaga brand, was gay but remained private about his sexuality for his entire life. His long-time partner, Franco-Polish millionaire Władzio Jaworowski d'Attainville, set up the fund for him to start the house. After d'Attainville died, Balenciaga's following collection was designed entirely in black to mourn his loss. The French fashion designer Christian Dior (b. 1905) was another hugely influential fashion designer of the 20th century. Dior never married nor openly identified as a gay man, however, he was known to frequent the gay cultural scene in Paris and was described by Coco Chanel as "a man who doesn’t know women, never had one, and dreams of being one”. Yves Saint Laurent (b. 1935), also regarded as being among the foremost fashion designers in the twentieth century, was openly gay; his long-time partner was Pierre Berge. Gianni Versace (b. 1946), an Italian fashion designer and founder of Versace, publicly came out in an interview with The Advocate in July 1995. Versace was murdered in 1997.

A younger generation of gay men gained prominence in the fashion world during the late twentieth and early twenty-first centuries. Tom Ford (b. 1961) founded his eponymous brand Tom Ford in 2005 and has stated that he realized he was gay as a young man visiting Studio 54 in the 1980s. Alexander McQueen (b. 1969), who was also openly gay, founded his own label Alexander McQueen in 1992 and was recognized as a fashion prodigy for his revolutionary designs. McQueen said he realized his sexual orientation when he was six years old. In 2000, McQueen had a marriage ceremony with his partner George Forsyth, a documentary filmmaker, on a yacht in Ibiza. McQueen died by suicide in 2010, shortly after the death of his mother. In recent years, gay men have continued to produce some of the most influential fashion in the world, including by designers such as Jeremy Scott (b. 1975), Jason Wu (b. 1982), and Alexander Wang (b. 1983).

=== Art ===
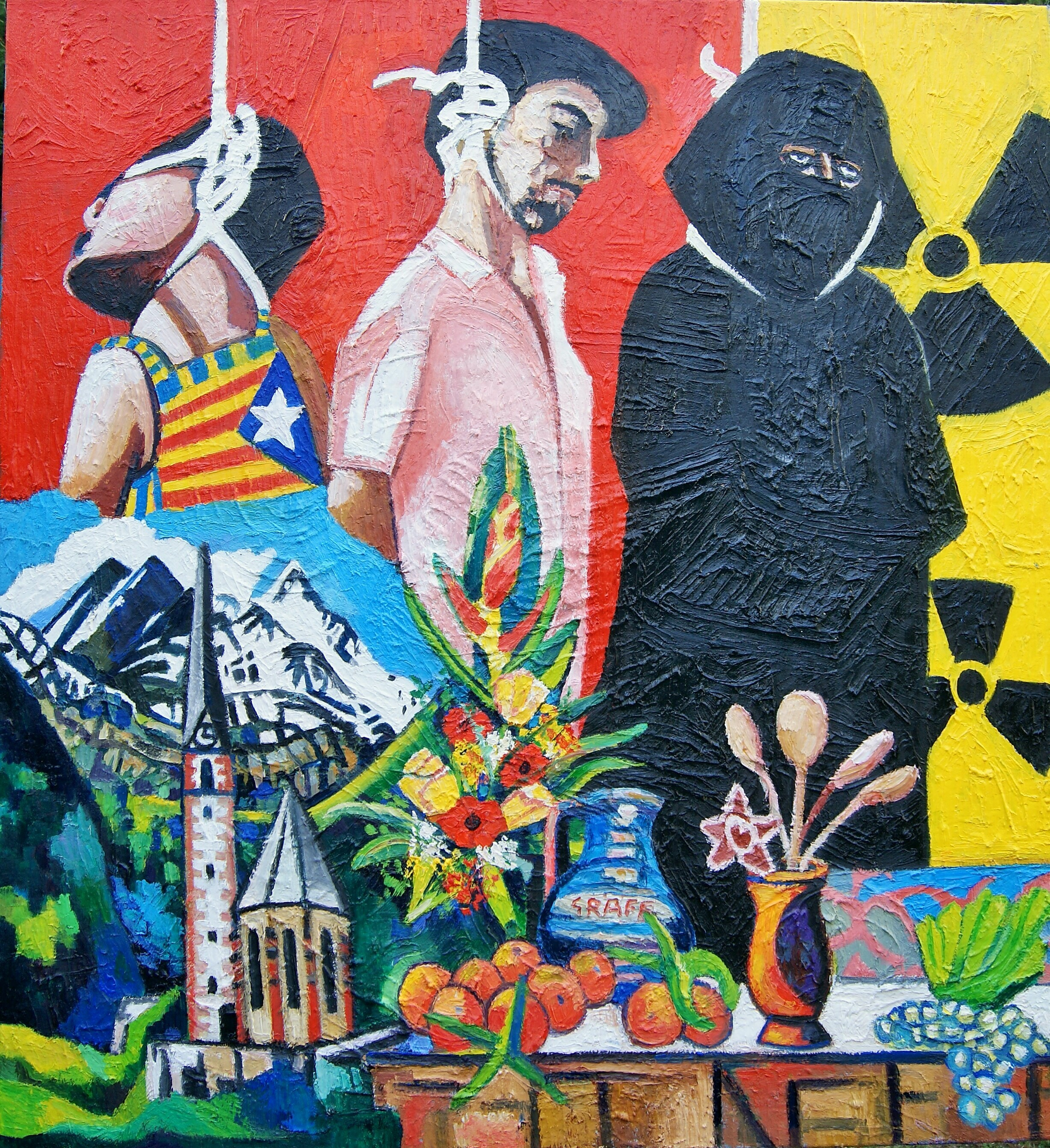
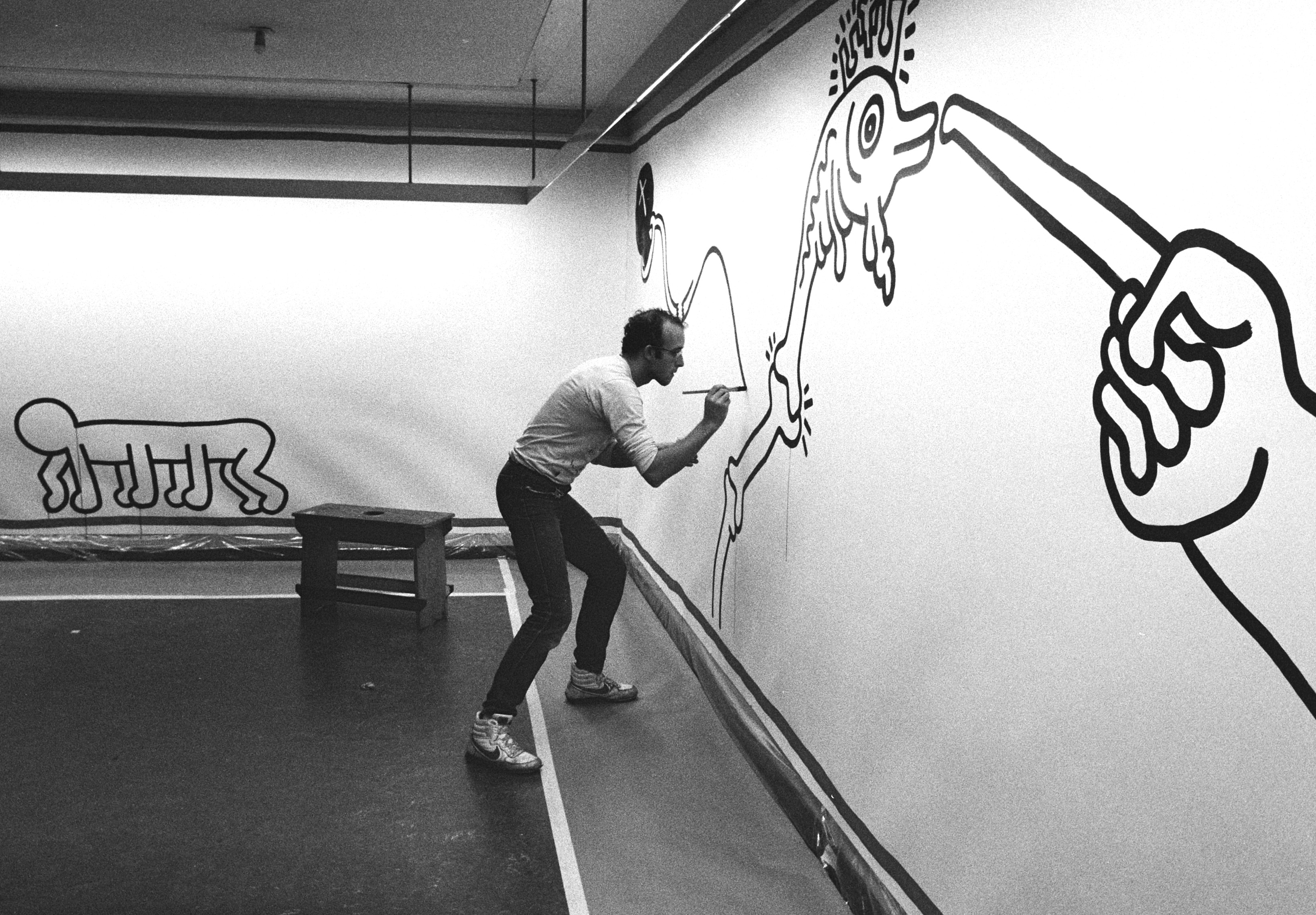
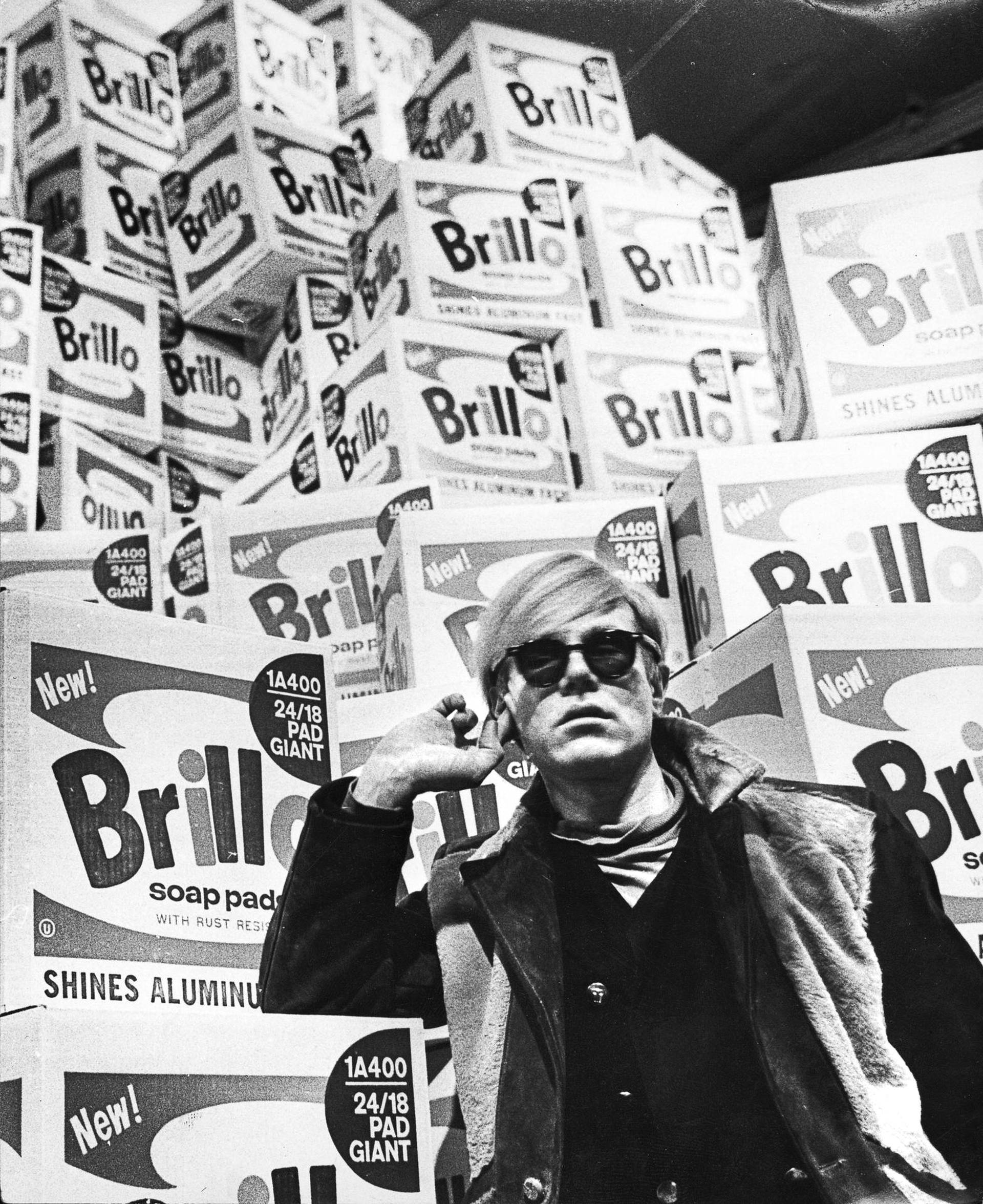
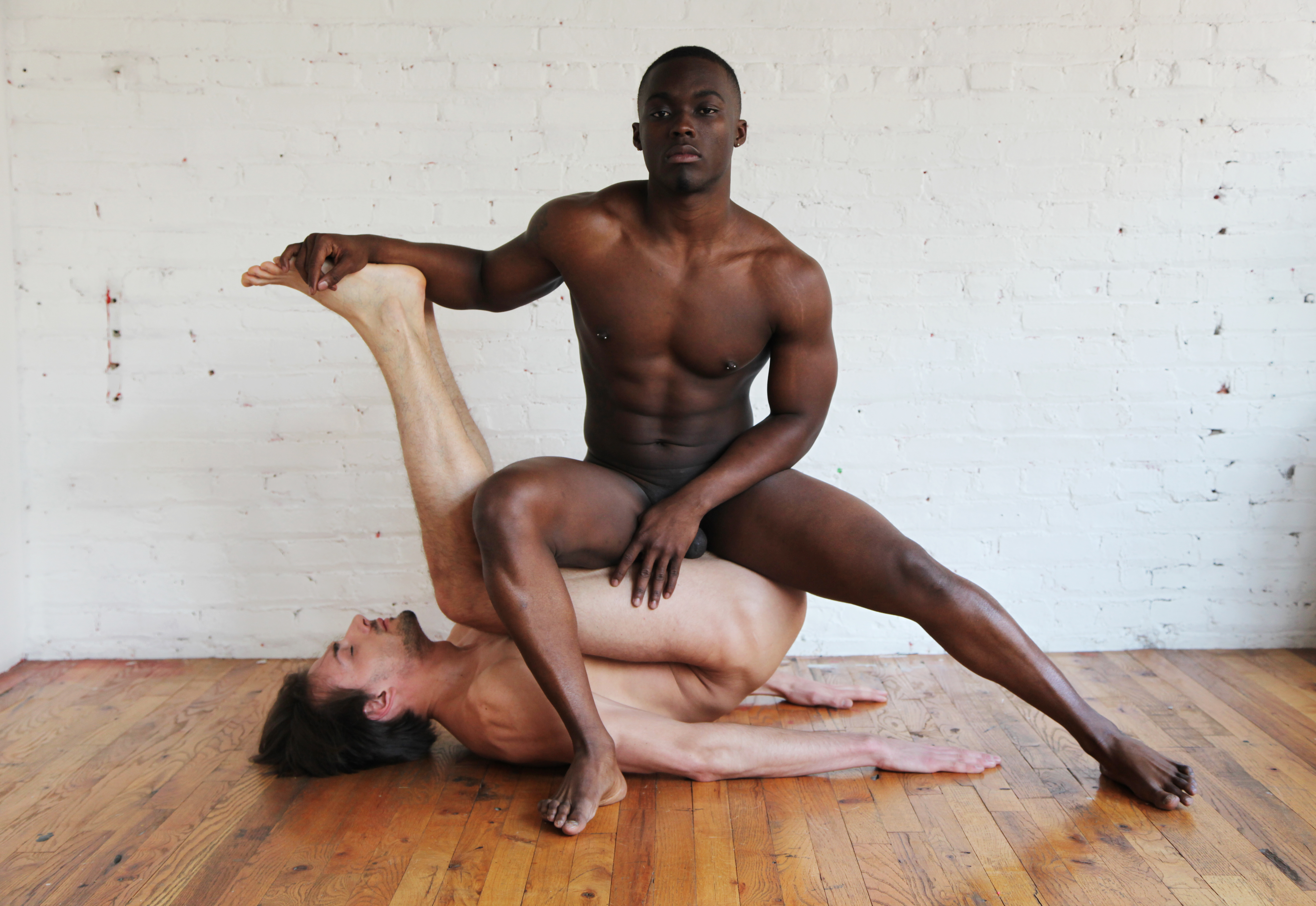
"Unfromme Wünsche" by Matthias Laurenz Gräff (top left), Keith Haring in East Harlem in 1986 (top right), American artist Andy Warhol in Moderna Museet, Stockholm (bottom left), and "Darya Zhukova" by Alexander Kargaltsev (bottom right).

In the 20th century, gay men were amongst the Western world's most influential and prolific artists, writers, and dancers. In the United States by mid-century, James Baldwin (b. 1924) was considered one of the best writers of his generation. His work, including Giovanni's Room (1956) dealt openly with homosexuality and bisexuality at a time when sex between men was still illegal throughout much of the Western world. Other major artists of Baldwin's generation, including Robert Rauschenberg (b. 1925) and Jasper Johns (b. 1930), were less open about their sexuality, and even made fun of other young gay artists of their generation, such as Andy Warhol, for being too feminine. In the world of New York dance, Alvin Ailey (b. 1931) fused theater, modern dance, ballet, and jazz with black vernacular, and his choreographic magnum opus Revelations is recognized as one of the most popular and most performed ballets in the world. Ailey remained closeted for much of his life, and he passed from an AIDS related illness at the age of 58. David Hockney (b. 1937), another major artist of the Silent Generation, was an important contributor to the pop art movement of the 1960s and is considered one of the most influential British artists of the 20th century. He was openly gay for much of his life.

Many of the most influential gay and bisexual artists of the Boomer and X generations died at very early ages during the AIDS crises, including Carlos Almaraz (b. 1941), Robert Mapplethorpe (b. 1946), Félix González-Torres (b. 1957), and Keith Haring (b. 1958). Much of the Art of the AIDS Crisis was highly political and critical of the U.S. government and has been described as "afraid, angry, fearful, and defiant". In the aftermath of the HIV/AIDS epidemic, gay men and other queer artists pioneered a new form of experimental filmmaking called New Queer Cinema. Today, gay men such as Mark Bradford, Julio Salgado, and Kehinde Wiley are amongst the most influential artists of their generation. Much of contemporary Western gay art today deals with themes of body, identity, and experience.

Outside of the West, art containing themes of gay male sexuality is still considered subversive and taboo. In Singapore, which criminalized all sexual acts between men through Section 377A of the Penal Code until 2022, art by gay men is considered countercultural. Gay men in Singapore historically have been depicted negatively in local mainstream media, and efforts to counter this discrimination from wider Singaporean society has been made difficult because of the risk of jail, bans, and censorship by the state.

=== Film and media art ===
In the United States, Andy Warhol made underground films with queer themes and actors. His work had an international influence in queer film art. The avant-garde director Rosa von Praunheim made more than 100 films on queer topics since the late 1960s, some of them have been evaluated internationally. Some films are considered milestones in queer cinema. Von Praunheim is internationally recognized as an icon of queer cinema. The director Rainer Werner Fassbinder had an early influence on queer cinema with films like Querelle (1982). These filmmakers and others pioneered queer Hollywood productions like Brokeback Mountain (2005), which reached an audience of millions.

=== Drag ===
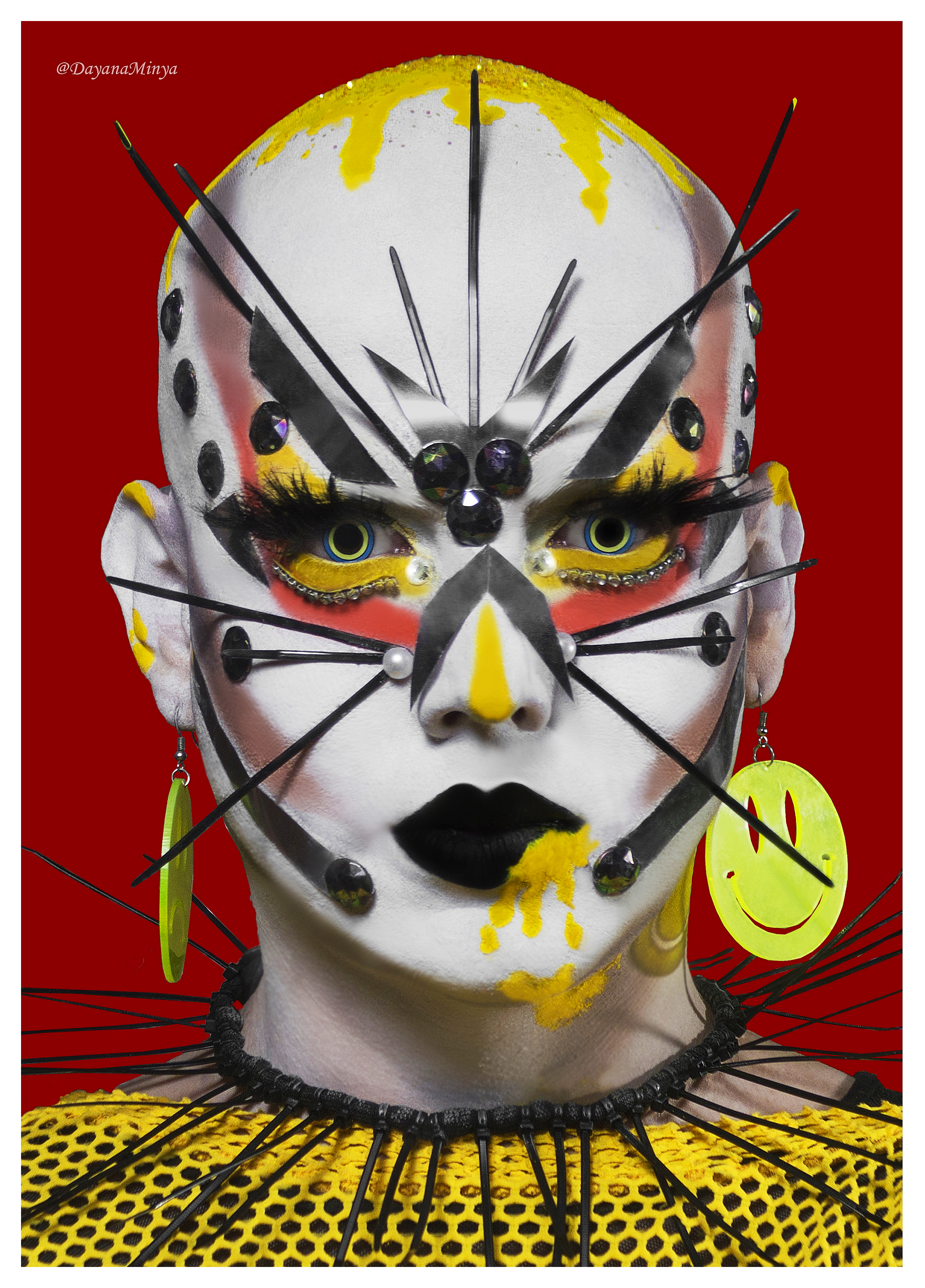
Post-Modern Art Attack

Drag queens are a significant part of the popular culture of gay men and are regularly featured in gay bars. Drag queens use drag clothing and makeup to imitate and often exaggerate female gender signifiers and gender roles as part of a performance used for artistic or entertainment purposes. Drag shows often include lip-syncing, dancing, and live singing. They occur at events like drag pageants and gay pride parades and in nightclubs and cabarets, as well as in local gay bars. Drag queens vary by dedication, type, and culture, and range from professionals who star in films and on Broadway, such as Gene Malin, Divine, or Rupaul, to people who do drag only occasionally.

Drag balls themselves have a long history for gay men in the United States. In 1869 at the Hamilton Lodge in Harlem, the first drag balls were held. These balls were held in secret, but news grew of their existence as a safe place for gay men to congregate. The balls were deemed immoral and illegal, and a moral reform organization known as the Committee of Fourteen investigated alleged "immoral" activities. In 1916, the committee released a report describing "'phenomenal ... male perverts' in expensive frocks and wigs, looking like women". By the 1920s, the balls grew in public visibility. In New York, the events, once called Masquerade and Civic Balls, were called "Faggots Balls" by the general public. The balls, however, also attracted some of the city's top artists and writers, including Charles Henri Ford and Parker Tyler. The men, who co-authored The Young and Evil, described the drag ball as "a scene whose celestial flavor and cerulean coloring no angelic painter or nectarish poet has ever conceived ... lit up like high mass." This flourishing of gay life in the 1920s and 30s was part of a period known as the Pansy Craze.

More recently, the film Paris is Burning (1990) detailed the drag ball scene of New York City and showcased the lives and experiences of a group of young "butch queens" (cisgender gay men), transgender women, drag queens, and butch women. Since its release, the film has become a cult classic and has served as an organizing and academic tool for the gay and trans communities (though it has been subject to significant criticism). Meanwhile, the television reality program RuPaul's Drag Race has been on-air in the United States since 2009 and has introduced the straight mainstream to gay men's popular culture through drag. The original American series has since developed into the global Drag Race franchise.

In the 2020s, a wave of anti-LGBTQ backlash in the United States resulted in what is known as the Drag panic. As part of this backlash, some U.S. states, such as Tennessee, criminalized the public performance of drag.

=== Camp ===
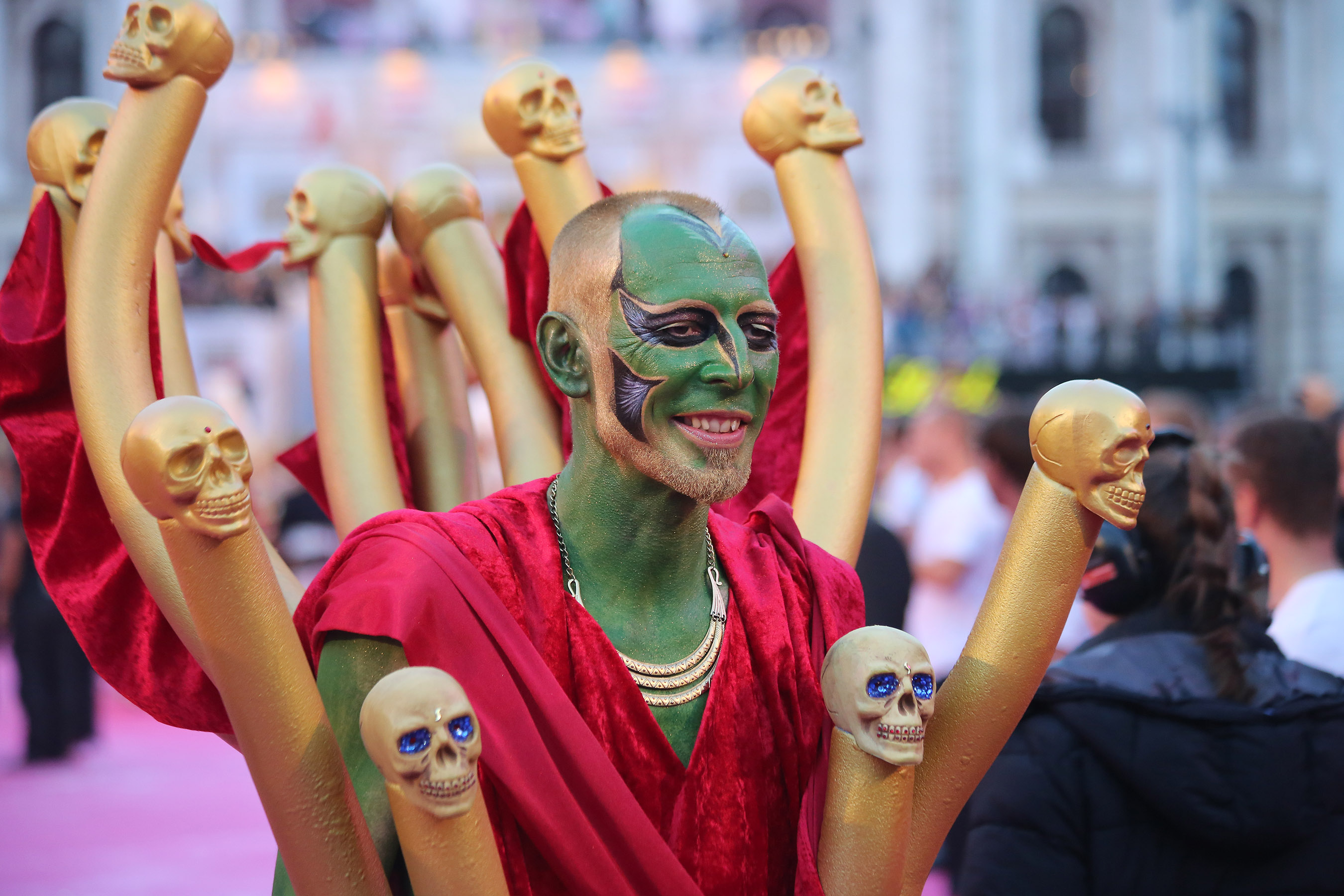
"Magenta carpet" at Life Ball 2013

Camp is a visual aesthetic style often associated with gay men. An English definition of the term first appeared in a 1909 edition of the Oxford English Dictionary: "ostentatious, exaggerated, affected, theatrical; effeminate or homosexual; pertaining to, characteristic of, homosexuals". From its original meaning, the term has evolved to signify an inversion of aesthetic attributes such as beauty, value, and taste through exaggeration and irony. Camp is often mistaken with kitsch and has been described as "cheesy". In 1964, Susan Sontag's essay Notes on "Camp" emphasized camp's key elements as: "artifice, frivolity, naïve middle-class pretentiousness, and shocking excess". In recent years, gay men have sought to disassociate themselves from the term. In a 2018 interview, director Ryan Murphy said he believed camp was "a lazy catchall that gets thrown at gay artists in order to marginalize their ambitions, to frame their work as niche" and preferred to describe his visual aesthetic style as "baroque". As some gay men have moved away from the term, however, mainstream straight society has appropriated it. In 2019, the New York Metropolitan Museum of Art hosted its annual event, the Met Gala, with the theme titled "Notes on Camp". That same year, the museum presented its full exhibit "Camp: Notes on Fashion", in which it presented numerous "campy" women's dresses. Nevertheless, in drag performances and at gay pride events, many gay men continue to embrace a camp aesthetic.

== Representation in media ==
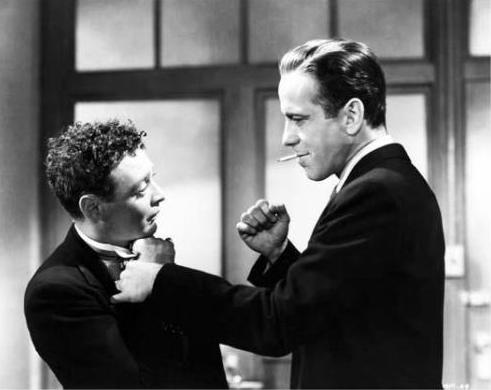
In The Maltese Falcon, Peter Lorre played an overtly stereotyped effeminate villain.

In many forms of popular entertainment, gay men are portrayed stereotypically as promiscuous, flamboyant, flashy, and sassy. Gay men are also rarely the main characters in mainstream films; they frequently play the role of stereotyped supporting characters or are portrayed as either a victim or the villain. Despite the stereotypical depictions of gay men, television shows since the 1990s, such as Queer as Folk, Queer Eye, Will & Grace, and Modern Family have promoted broader social acceptance of gay men as "normal people". Nevertheless, gay men are still frequently portrayed in the United States as symbols of social decadence by evangelists and organizations such as Focus on the Family.

=== Historical Western media representations ===
Boys Beware, a 1961 U.S. propaganda film warning boys to beware the "predatory" dangers of homosexual men

Historically, many films have included negative sub-texts regarding male homosexuality, such as in Alfred Hitchcock's films, whose villains used implied homosexuality to heighten senses of evil and alienation. In news programming, male homosexuality was rarely directly mentioned, but it was often portrayed as a sickness, perversion, or crime. In 1967, CBC released a news segment on homosexuality; however, the segment was simply a compilation of negative stereotypes of gay men. The 1970s showed an increase in gay men's visibility in Western media with the 1972 ABC show That Certain Summer. The show was about a gay man raising a family, and although it did not show any explicit relations between the men, it contained no negative stereotypes.

With the emergence of the AIDS epidemic and its explicit associations with gay men, media outlets in the U.S. varied in their coverage, portrayal, and acceptance of gay male communities. The American Family Association, the Coalition for Better Television, and the Moral Majority organized boycotts against advertisers on television programs which showed gay men in a positive light. Media coverage of gay men during the AIDS crisis depended on the location and therefore the local attitudes toward gay men. For example, in the Bay Area, The San Francisco Chronicle hired an openly gay man as a reporter and ran detailed stories on gay male topics. This was a sharp contrast to The New York Times, which refused to use the word "gay" in its writing, exclusively referring to gay men and lesbians with the term "homosexuals", because it was believed to be a more clinical term. The Times also limited its verbal and visual coverage of issues pertaining to gay men.

=== Contemporary Western media representations ===
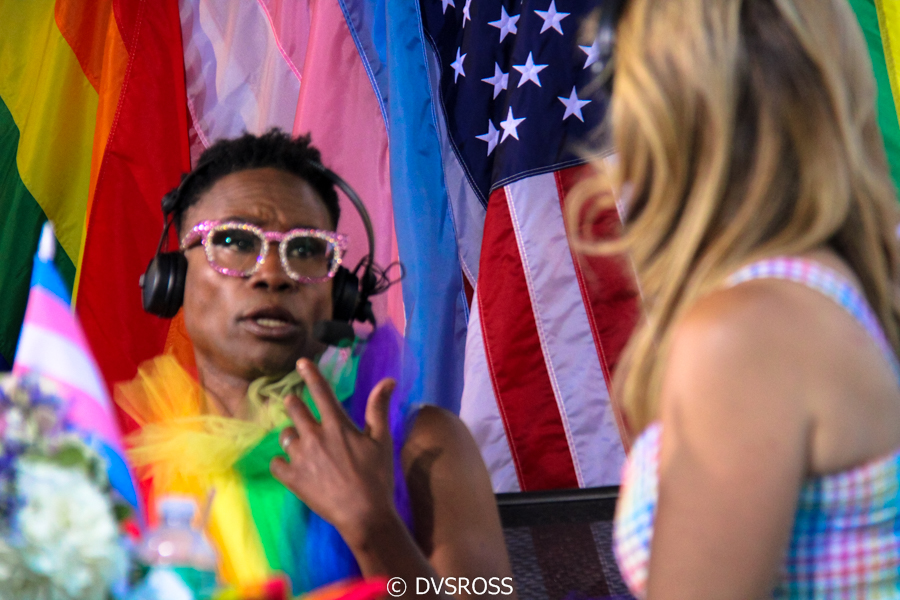
On Pose, Billy Porter plays Pray Tell, a Black gay man with AIDS in New York.

In the 1980s, the AIDS crisis greatly affected the representation of gay men in American media.

Melanie Kohnen writes that, initially, the news media portrayed AIDS as a disease that affects mainly urban, White gay men; in spite of the fact that most victims of AIDS were gay Black and Hispanic men. However, by the late 1980s it had become undeniable that most of the victims of AIDS were gay men of color, and the media finally came to acknowledge this commonly-known fact. Yet the new coverage maintained the image of White men as heroic leaders in the fight against AIDS; while ignoring the perspectives of the gay men of color. Kohnen attributes this favorable (and unwarranted) representation of White men to white privilege.

During the crisis, American media tended to focus on the "raunchiness" of gay culture, and divided gay men in to two archetypes: "victims" (those affected by HIV) and "villains" (who allegedly spread HIV, deliberately).

The AIDS pandemic delayed positive representations of gay men until the 1990s, when the first positive representations of gay men began to appear in American media. However, most of these gay men were White, masculine, apolitical and never depicted romantically with other men. This new depiction of gay men catered to heterosexual audiences, and did not reflect the true diversity of the LGBTQ community.

Scholars have noted that intersectional representations of gay men of color are generally not present on television. Additionally, when television shows do depict gay men of color, they are often less visible, or merely the love interests of a White male character. They have also often depicted as "race neutral", meaning that their gayness is paramount to all of their other attributes, thus obscuring their ethnic identity.

== Health ==
Gay men in the United States are less likely to be overweight or obese compared to their heterosexual counterparts.

=== Abuse ===
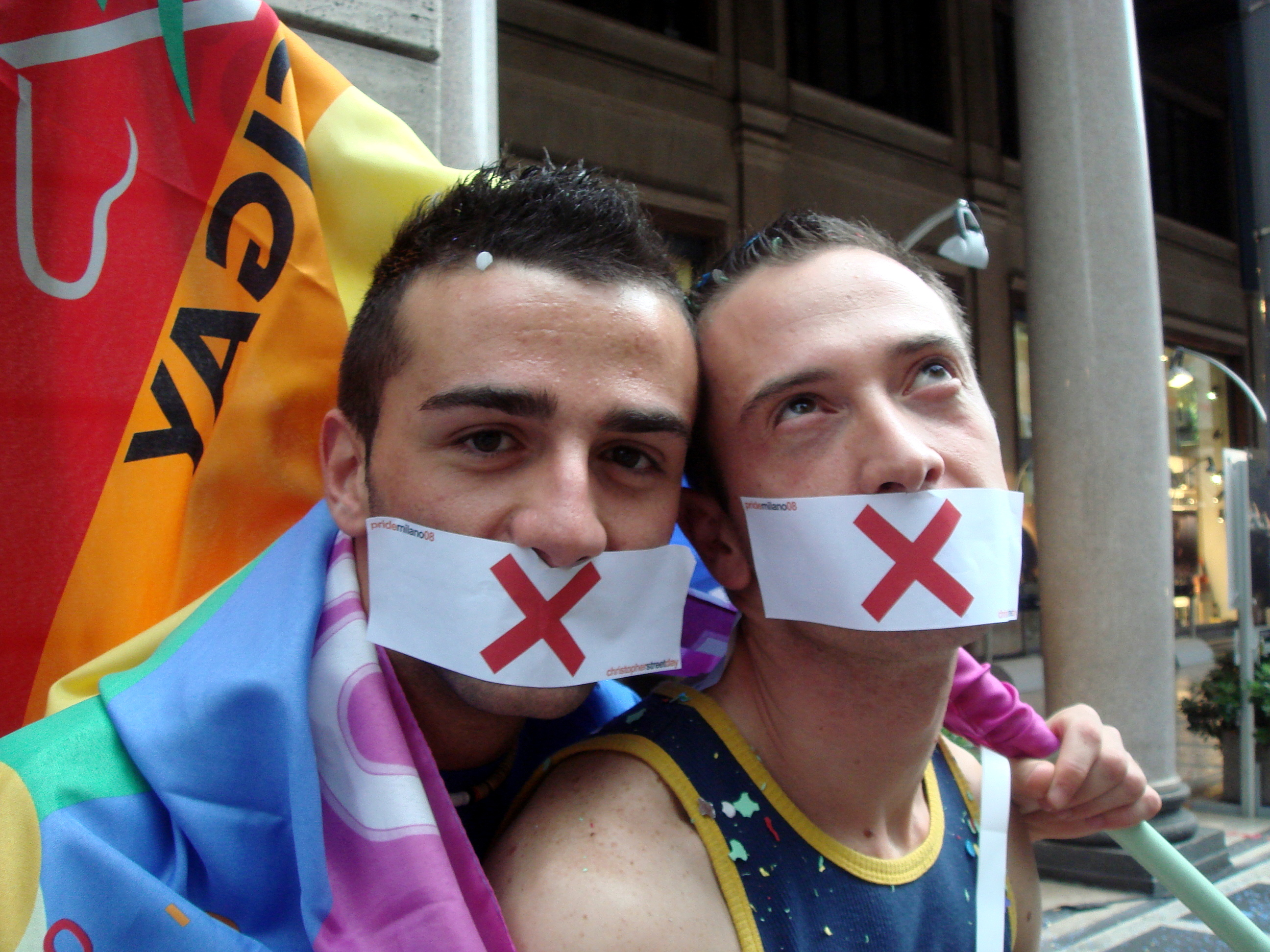
Gay men are more likely to be abused but less likely to seek help.

Gay men are at an increased risk of being physically and sexually abused, particularly those who exhibit early gender nonconforming behavior (femininity). Writing about his own experience as a feminine boy, gay Moroccan writer Abdellah Taïa, wrote in a New York Times op-ed: "I knew what happened to boys like me in our impoverished society; they were designated victims, to be used, with everyone's blessing, as easy sexual objects by frustrated men." Gay men are less likely than women to seek mental health assistance, oftentimes due to social stigma and false beliefs around sexual assault, such as "men cannot be forced to have sex" and "men become gay or bisexual because they were sexually abused."

=== Sexual health ===
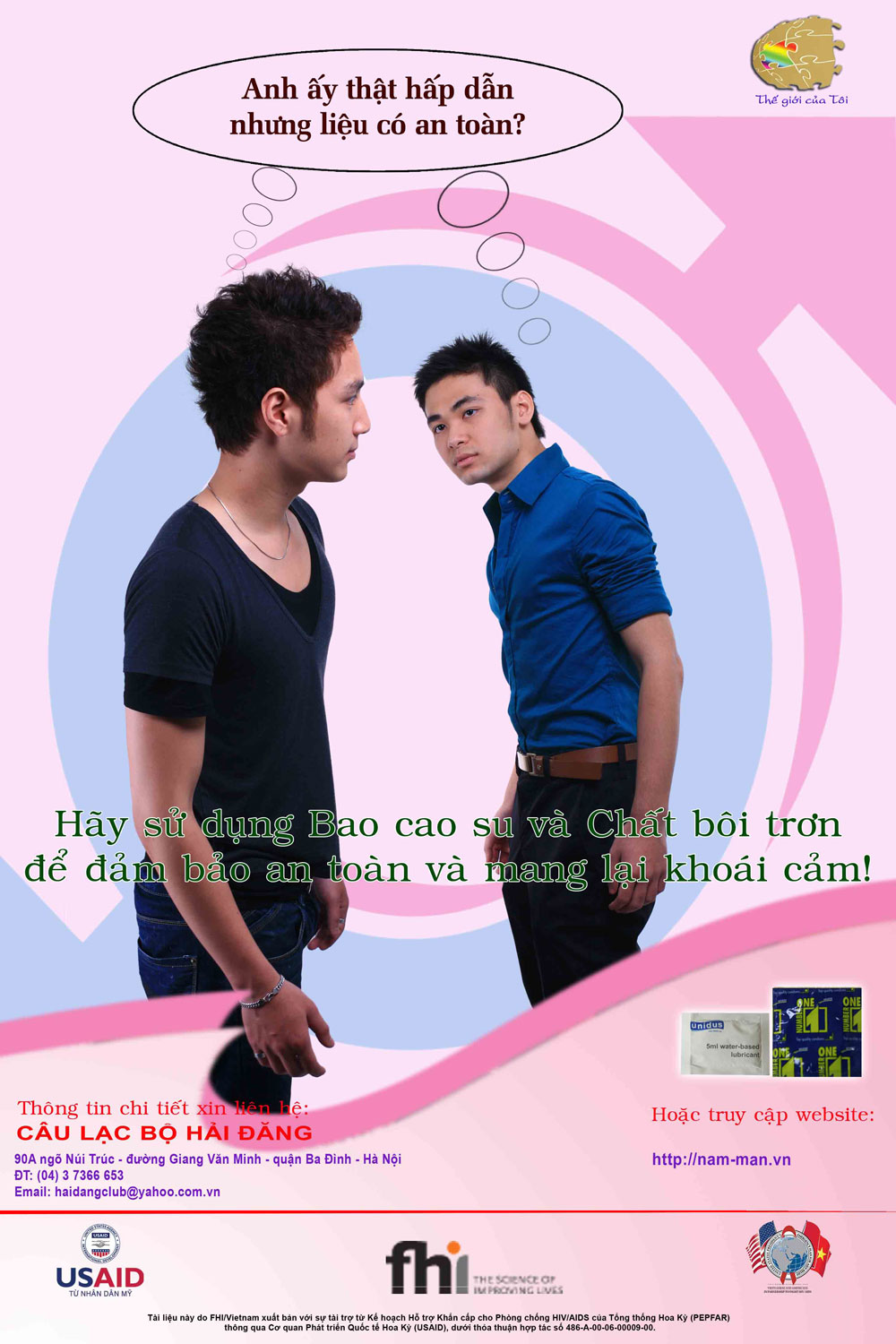
HIV prevention poster advocating for safe MSM sex in Vietnam

Around the world, gay, bisexual, and other men who have sex with men (MSM) face significant challenges in terms of their overall sexual health. According to a UNAIDS report, MSM have a "staggering" 27 times higher risk of contracting HIV than other demographic groups, and the highest median prevalence among this population is found in Sub-Saharan Africa.

New HIV infection rates for MSM vary by region, but according to a 2018 UN report, HIV cases among MSM represent: 57% of all new cases in North America, Central Europe, and Western Europe; 41% of all new cases in Latin America; 25% of all new cases in Asia, the Pacific Islands, and the Caribbean; 20% of all new cases in Eastern Europe, Central Asia, North Africa, and the Middle East; and 12% of all new cases in Western and Central Africa.

In countries with diverse racial populations, such as the United States, France, and the United Kingdom, new HIV infections among gay and bisexual men are found disproportionately in working-class and communities of color. In the United States, there are currently full-blown HIV crises amongst gay Chicano and Latino men in the Mexico-U.S. borderlands region, and amongst African American MSM in the South. In the South, Black gay, bisexual, and other MSM account for six out of every 10 new HIV diagnoses amongst all African Americans. In recent years, independent news sources have shown that working-class Black and Latino gay men in the United States still face significant health disparities in these crises; however, in the United States, as in other places around the world, these problems have only worsened as HIV-positive MSM (especially those from already disadvantaged communities) have been severely and disproportionately affected by the global COVID-19 pandemic.

In addition to HIV, young gay, bisexual, and other MSM are also at significantly higher risk for other sexual health-related issues. Because compulsive and condomless sexually related behaviors are also strongly associated with depression, young MSM (who are disproportionately likely to experience clinical depression) are at increased risk of sexually transmitted infections via unsafe sex. Furthermore, because depression is strongly linked to a history of being sexual abused, the high rate of past childhood sexual trauma among gay men leaves many in the community vulnerable to unhealthy behaviors and practices. As a combination of these complex factors, many gay, bisexual, and MSM have higher rates of STIs, including chlamydia and gonorrhea, and in the United States, account for 83% of all primary and secondary syphilis cases.

=== Mental health ===
There are significant issues affecting the overall mental health of gay men. In the United States, 29.3 percent of gay and bisexual men report experiencing chronic daily psychological distress. Gay and bisexual men are exposed to significant minority stress, which is the constant exposure to stressors because of their minority identity in society. Familial and social rejection, homophobia, alienation, and isolation can contribute to mental health issues such as anxiety, depression, and a lack of self-acceptance. These issues have been found to be exacerbated in gay men who have experienced sexual abuse. Even in countries with social and legal protections for gay men, such as the United Kingdom, France, and the United States, structural societal stigma against homosexual men persists, and discrimination has been shown to have negative effects on the mental health of gay men. In fact, compared to straight men, gay and bisexual men have a higher chance of having both major depression and generalized anxiety disorder. Gay and bisexual men are also at greater risk of dying by suicide; they are one of the demographic groups most likely to have tried to commit suicide, as well as to actually die by suicide. Finally, HIV-positive status continues to have a major impact on the mental health of many gay and bisexual men, who fear disclosing their status to employers, friends, and families, particularly if they have not yet come out.

=== Incarceration ===
==== United States ====
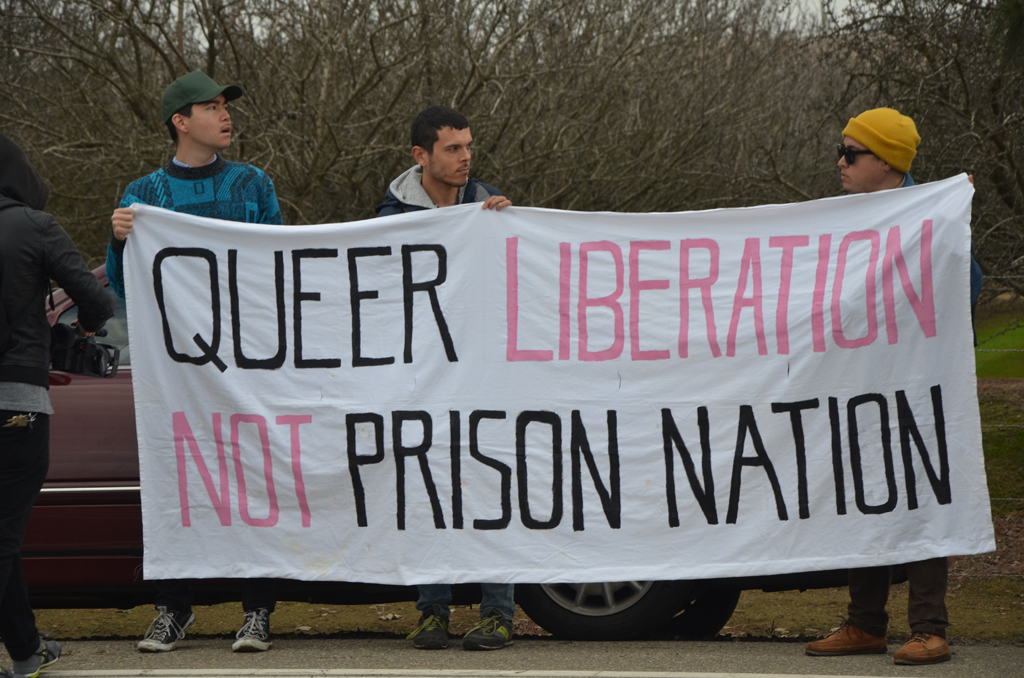
Protest against mass incarceration in Chowchilla, California in January 2013

In 2017, a survey conducted by the U.S. Department of Justice and the Williams Institute at the UCLA School of Law found that in local and county jails, 6.2 percent of all incarcerated men were sexual minorities, including 3.3 percent who identified as gay or bisexual, and 2.9 percent who did not identify as gay or bisexual but reported having had sex with men (MSM). This number was higher amongst men within state and federal prisons, where 5.5 percent identified as gay or bisexual, and an additional 3.8 were MSM. The Williams Institute's research team also found that gay and bisexual men received longer and harsher sentences for the same crimes committed compared to heterosexual men. Gay and bisexual men were found to be 2.7 times more likely to receive prison terms exceeding 20 years than straight men, and were more likely to have spent time in solitary confinement while incarcerated: 26.8 of gay and bisexual men had been held in solitary compared to 18.2 of straight men.

Additionally, gay men are at increased risk of rape and sexual abuse while in prison. A report by the international human-rights organization Human Rights Watch found that in U.S. prisons, the rape of incarcerated gay men is often administratively dismissed because of the misconception that any sexual contact involving a gay man and another male is inherently consensual. As a result, rape victims who are known or believed to be gay are sometimes even denied medical treatment or legal recourse, and perpetrators often go unpunished and thus are allowed to continue abusing their victims.

=== Homelessness ===
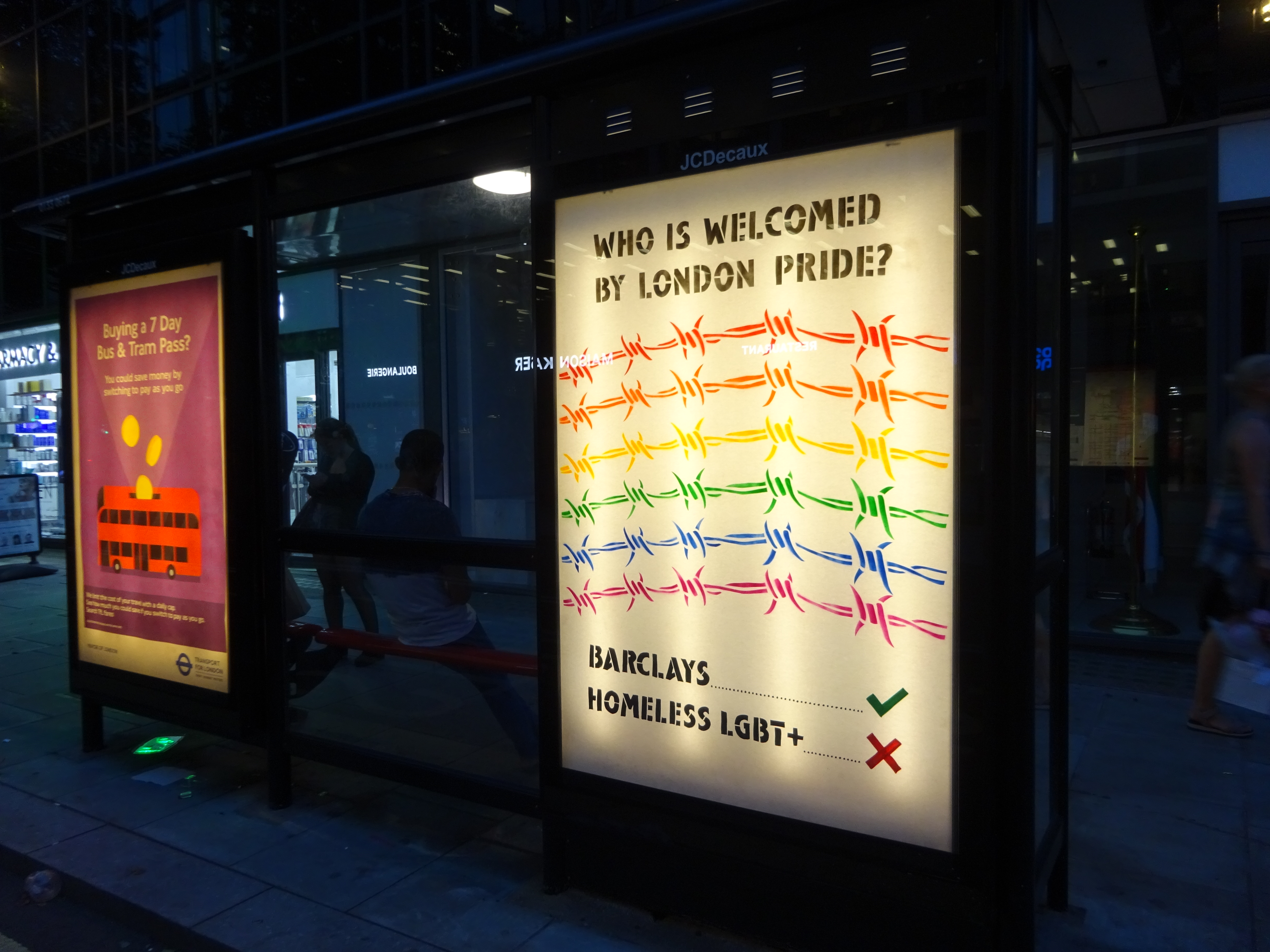
London advert protesting the exclusion of unhoused LGBT people

For many young gay men and LGBTQ youth around the world, homelessness and housing insecurity are serious issues. In the United States, which has the largest homeless population in the Western world outside of Germany, numerical estimates of housing insecure LGBTQ youth range from 1.6 million to 2.8 million. In one U.S. national sample, nearly half of houseless LGBTQ youth reported they had been kicked out of their home because their family had rejected their sexual orientation or identity. For young gay men, the precariousness of unstable housing comes with many dangers; for example, studies have found that young gay men and adolescents were more likely than their straight counterparts to be sexually victimized while homeless. Amongst adults, no nationally representative datasets exist yet for measuring the sexual orientation or gender identity of homeless or housing insecure individuals; however, some estimates place the LGBTQ community at between 20 and 40% of the United States' homeless populations.

== Community and identity ==
=== Subcultures ===
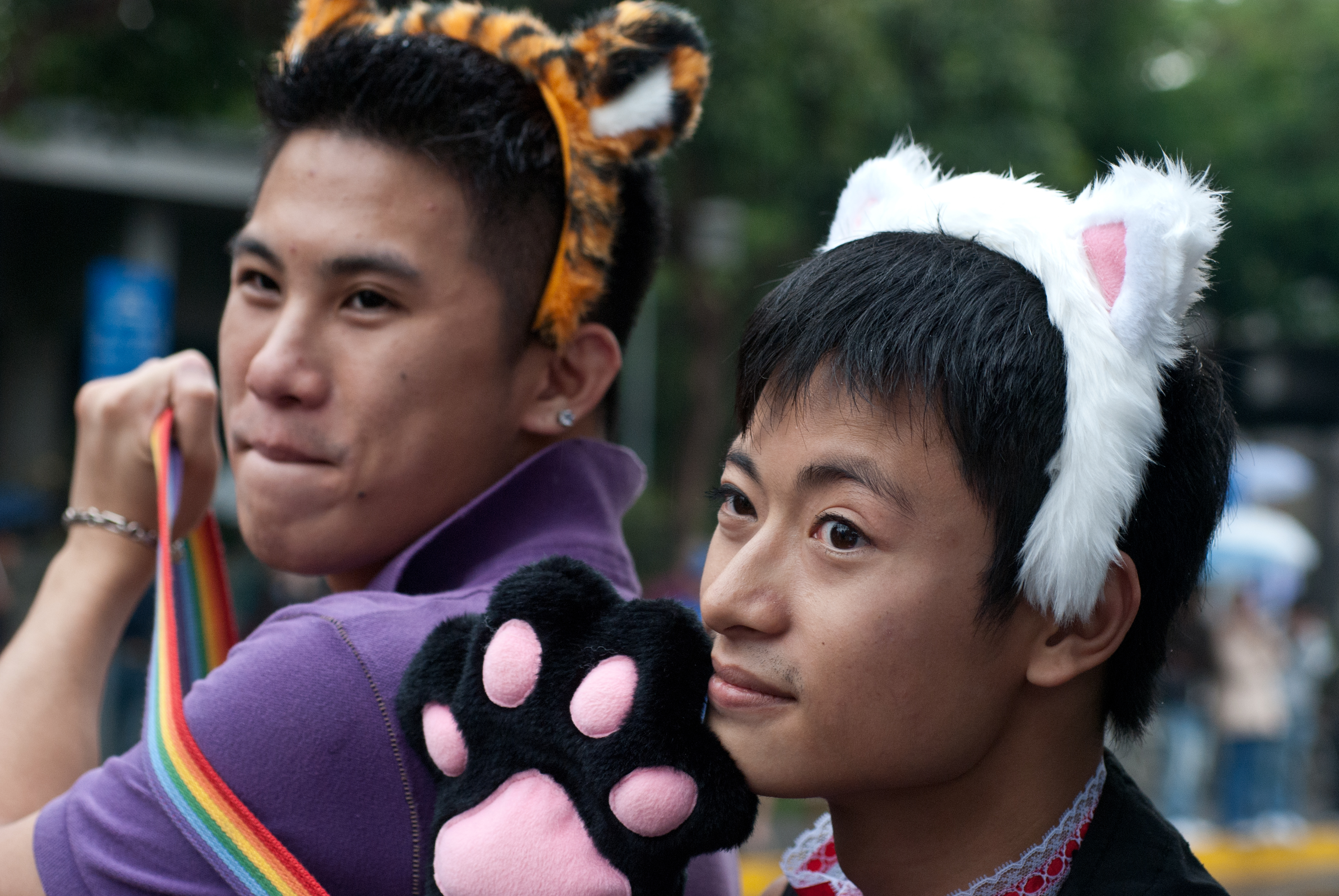
Two young gay men at Taiwan Pride

In North America and Europe, gay men have several subcultures, including Twinks, Bears, Otters, Queens, Jocks, Gaymers, and others. According to scholars, these subcultures, which largely originated as part of a "gay American way of life", have in some ways become a "global template" for gay culture around the world. In India, where a gay culture is slowly emerging, despite anti-gay "societal values, the caste system, arranged marriages, [and] the high probability of being disinherited for coming out", some gay men are working to develop a mature and distinct-Indian culture while also adopting aspects of global gay culture. One Indian gay man who identifies as a Bear, stated in an interview, "Because [straight people] see me in chunky rings and bracelets, heavy metal tees riding a Harley Davidson, it doesn't fit in with the Indian stereotype of effeminate gay. While I have nothing against being effeminate, not all gay men are so ... Encouraging a bear culture [in India] will see more men feeling comfortable coming out and avoiding the trap of a face-saving heterosexual marriage."

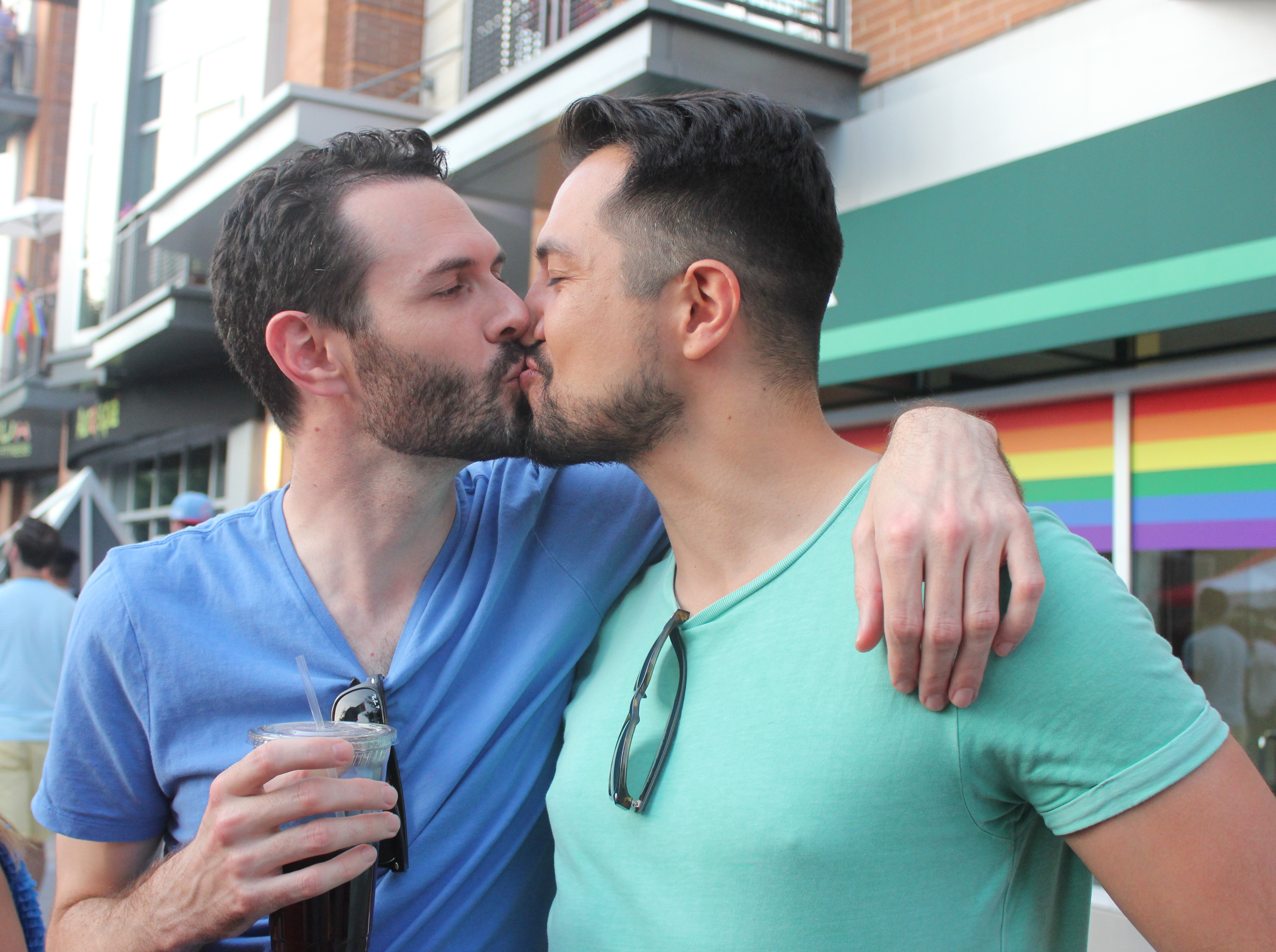
Two gay men kiss during a pride event

In Canada, which already has mature urban communities of gay men, some gay artists are working to counter the fact that the social acceptability of a gay subculture is often dependent on how closely it aligns with Western standards of conventional attractiveness. The video artist Mike Wyeld, whose exhibition "LOVED", showcased the Bear community, stated, "Some of the things that the media's obsessed with — obesity, weight loss, body shape, aging — some of these things we have to be happy with. We get bigger, we get older. You can fight it and be miserable or you can accept it and live with the body that you have and love it." In the United Kingdom, journalists have noted the role mobile apps such as Grindr have played in creating self-segregating subcultures (also called "tribes") within gay men's communities.

=== Youth ===
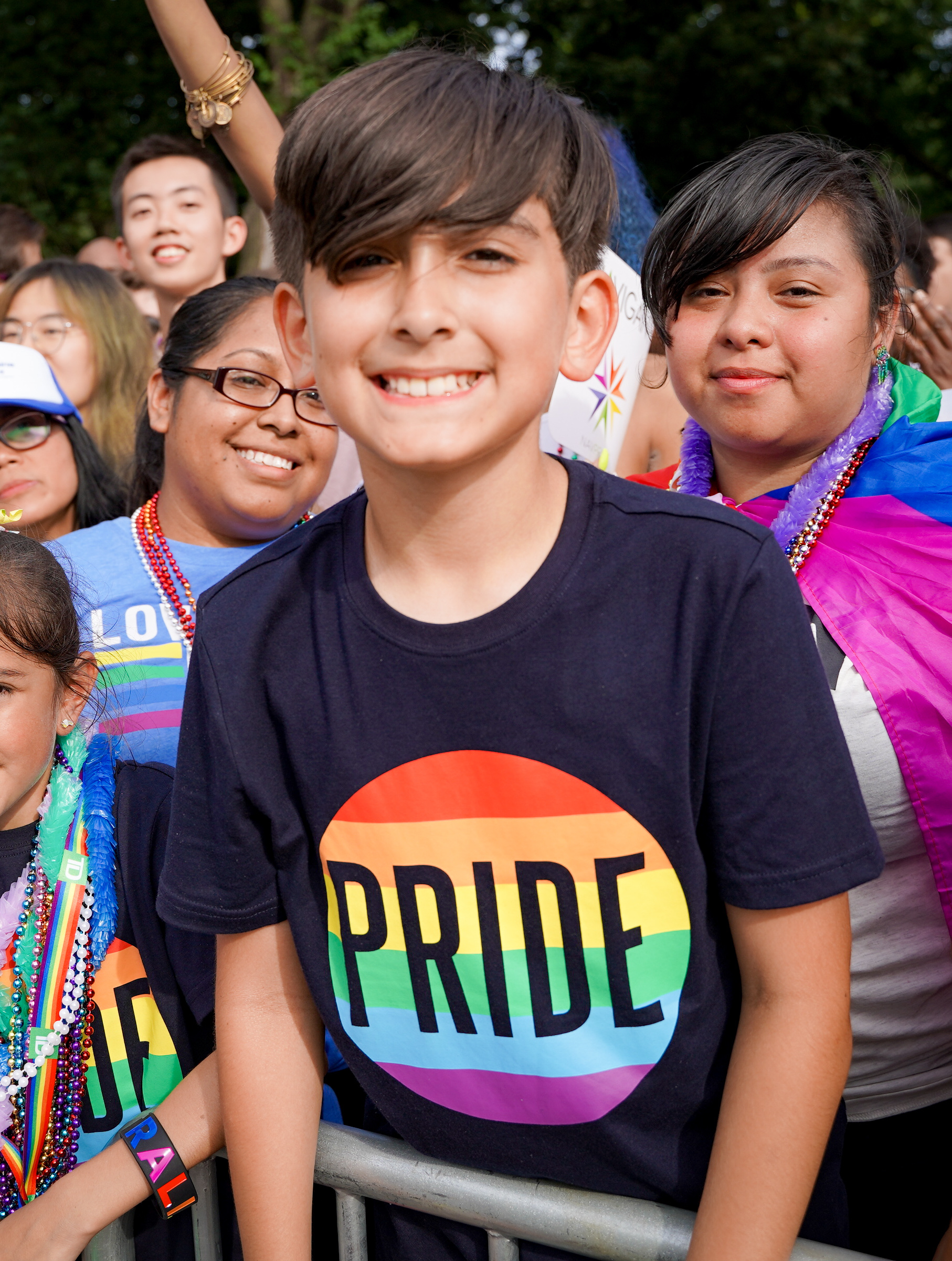
A youth at DC Pride

Gay adolescents, boys, and young men are a uniquely vulnerable segment of the gay male population. In many countries, identity-issues, bullying, and lack of family acceptance are some of the major concerns facing gay-identified youth. Additionally, gay boys and adolescents around the world are regularly subjected to more extreme forms of violence, including conversion therapy, familial violence, and other forms of physical abuse. These issues have been shown to have detrimental effects on the well-being of gay and bisexual male youth. In the United States, a 2019 report by the CDC found that suicidal ideation amongst gay and bisexual boys and adolescents is as high as 40.4%. According to the CDC, however, parental support can play an important role in bettering health outcomes for gay and bisexual youth, decreasing the likelihood a gay teen will: "Experience depression; attempt suicide; use drugs and alcohol; [or] become infected with sexually transmitted diseases." For educators, the inclusion of diverse curriculum and the development of peer support venues (such as Queer–Straight Alliances in North America) have been suggested as ways to reduce the frequency and effects of bullying and cyberbullying. Such measures are particularly important for gay and bisexual male students, who, in 2019, were the second most likely group (behind trans students) to have experienced bullying at school (73.9%) and online (30%) in the most recent 30 days, according to research by Sameer Hinduja and Justin Patchin. Despite these calls for inclusive and diverse curriculums, Scotland is currently the only country in the world with a mandated LGBTQ-inclusive curriculum in its public school system. While many nations offer a piecemeal approach to LGBTQ education, others (including several U.S. states) have explicit bans on the inclusion of gay-friendly education. Despite the challenges gay teenagers face, studies have found that gay male youth also develop skillsets which enable them to more successfully cope with stress and other developmental challenges than their straight peers. In comparing gay boys and adolescents to their heterosexual peers, gay-identified youth show higher levels of resilience, positive self-esteem, and internal self-control.

=== Fatherhood ===
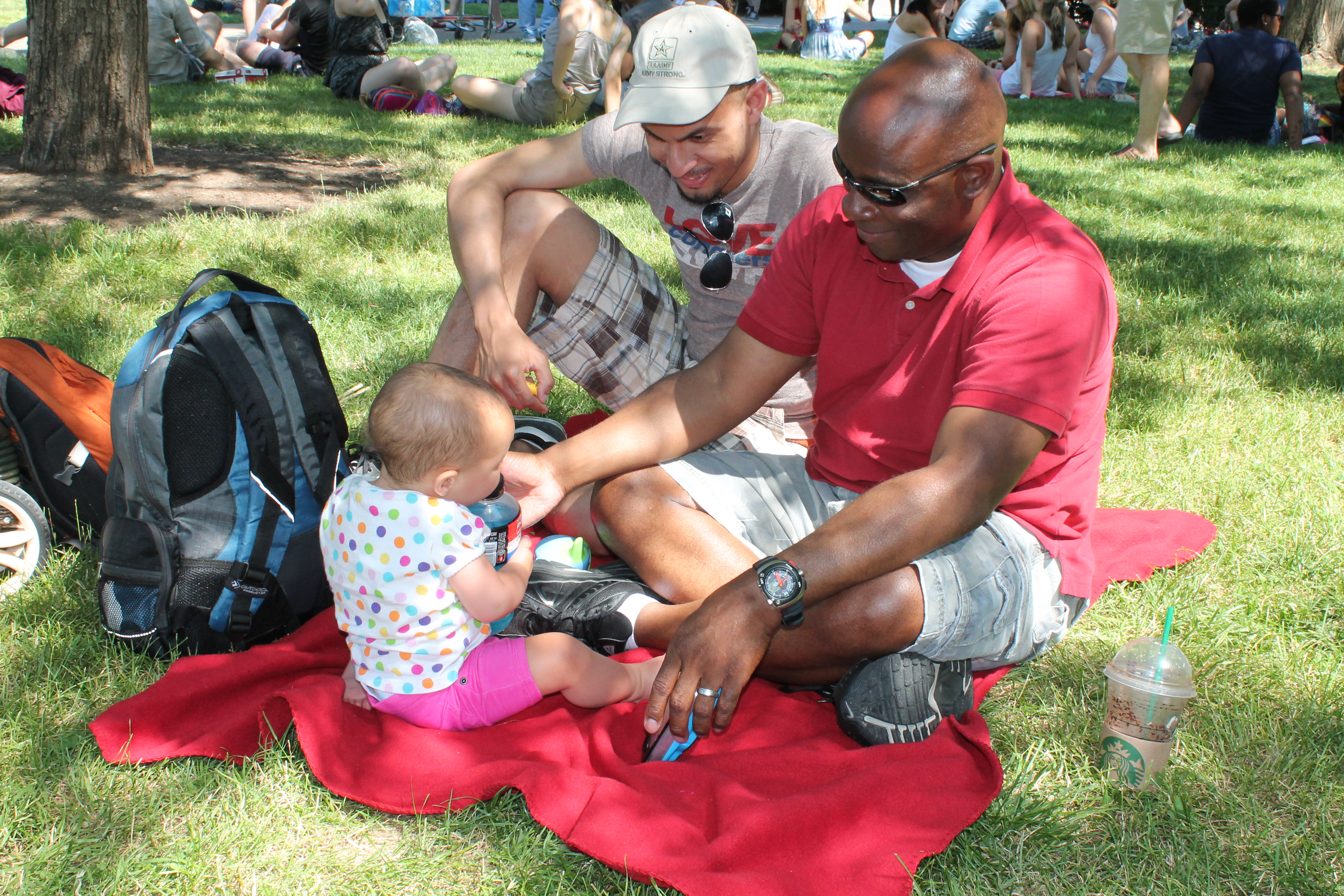
Two fathers with their child

In the majority of countries today, adoption by same-sex couples is not legally allowed. In Western Europe, most of South America, and North America, however, gay men can became fathers in a variety of ways, including adoption, surrogates, and births from previous relationships. In recent years, prominent gay men such as Anderson Cooper and Elton John have made headlines for becoming fathers, and gay men have been increasingly represented on television as fathers (though these representations have been subject to critiques for their one-dimensionality). In spite of these advances in visibility and representation, however, gay fathers and their families still experience high levels of discrimination and social stigma from their relatives, neighbors, and other members of their communities. In the United States, two-thirds of gay fathers report experiencing social stigma, and one-third report that their children faced stigmatization from other children for having gay parents. The majority of social scientific research shows the children of gay fathers to be equally well adjusted as the children of heterosexual parents.

=== Age ===
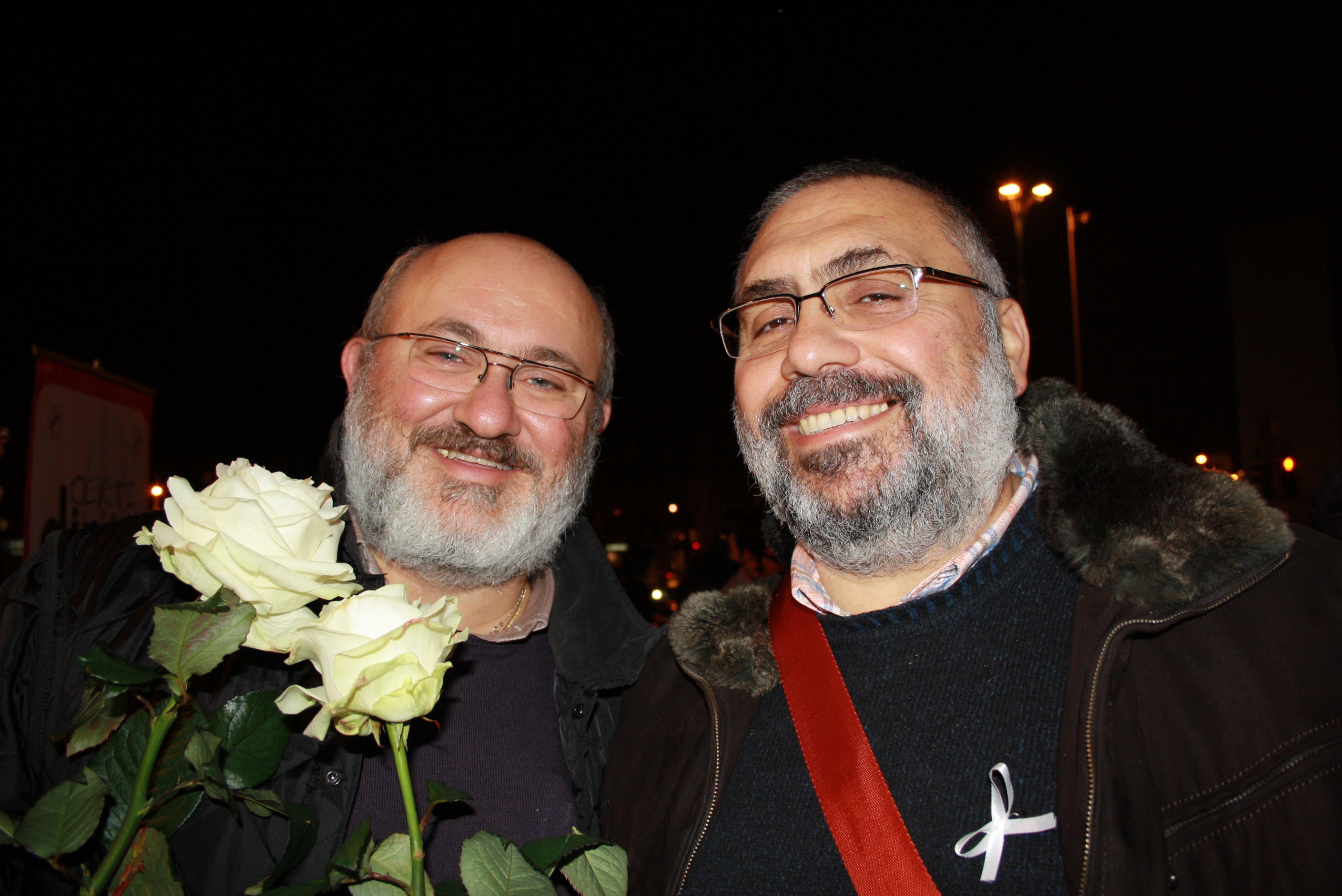
Two older gay men in March 2010

Older gay men are one of the least studied groups within gay men's communities. In Mexico, Vida Alegre opened in 2019 as the first senior center for LGBTQ people in the country. According to the center's founder, Samantha Flores, loneliness is a major problem for many older gay men in Mexico, stating, "I've had people come in, older gay men, sobbing and pouring their hearts out to me about how unhappy they are ... They usually don't have children, and many of their families have disowned them, so they need to turn to families they have chosen themselves or friends for social contact." According to Flores, many of these older gay men in Mexico are also living with PTSD because of their many lost friends and partners who died during the AIDS epidemic. In France, the documentary filmmaker Sébastien Lifshitz made Les Invisibles, a 2012 documentary about elderly gay French people, and he found significant ideological differences between younger and older gay people. Lifshitz stated, "What's important to understand is that this older generation of gay people in France fought against the heterosexual, bourgeois model of French society with all their might. The fact that there are much younger gay couples today that are demanding the right to get married and adopt children is something the older gay generation understands, but does not want for themselves." Finally, in the United States, scholars have found that most older gay American men are not "strange, lonely creatures" but are instead "well-adjusted to their homosexuality and the aging process".

=== Gender identity ===
For trans and gender nonconforming gay and bisexual men, there are unique aspects of their identity which shape their experience within gay men's communities. In Canada, gay and bisexual trans men often use specific apps and websites, such as Grindr and Tinder, to find romantic and sexual partners. Canadian trans men report that personal developments (such as gender transition) and socio-historical changes (like increasing trans male visibility and the rise of virtual dating applications) are producing rapidly changing sexual and romantic opportunities; In 2017, most gay Canadian trans men reported having satisfying sexual lives. In a 2009 interview with New York magazine, the writer Amos Mac, who identifies as queer, said, "I very much [identify] as a fag. I [am] drawn to the community of gay men, and that's how I embody myself. I'm attracted to guys who have a bit of flair to them. They don't have to be gay, but they can be queeny. I love an artistic queen." In his 2017 book, Trans Homo, Avi Ben-Zeev addresses the historical presence of trans gay men within the community, writing, "Elders, like Lou Sullivan, paved the way and have brought some visibility to the fact that trans men are, and have been, an integral part of gay male communities. Yet, we trans homos (and our lovers) are still mysterious creatures to many, even within these communities." In a 2004 collection of personal essays, one man wrote about his identity formation as a gay trans man, writing "I [never felt] that being gay, or [transgender] was unnatural. I've always felt that the people who never questioned their gender, sexuality, or fertility were the odd ones. If anyone needs an outsider's label, it's the ones who moralize against human sexuality, not the ones who accept it."

=== Disability ===
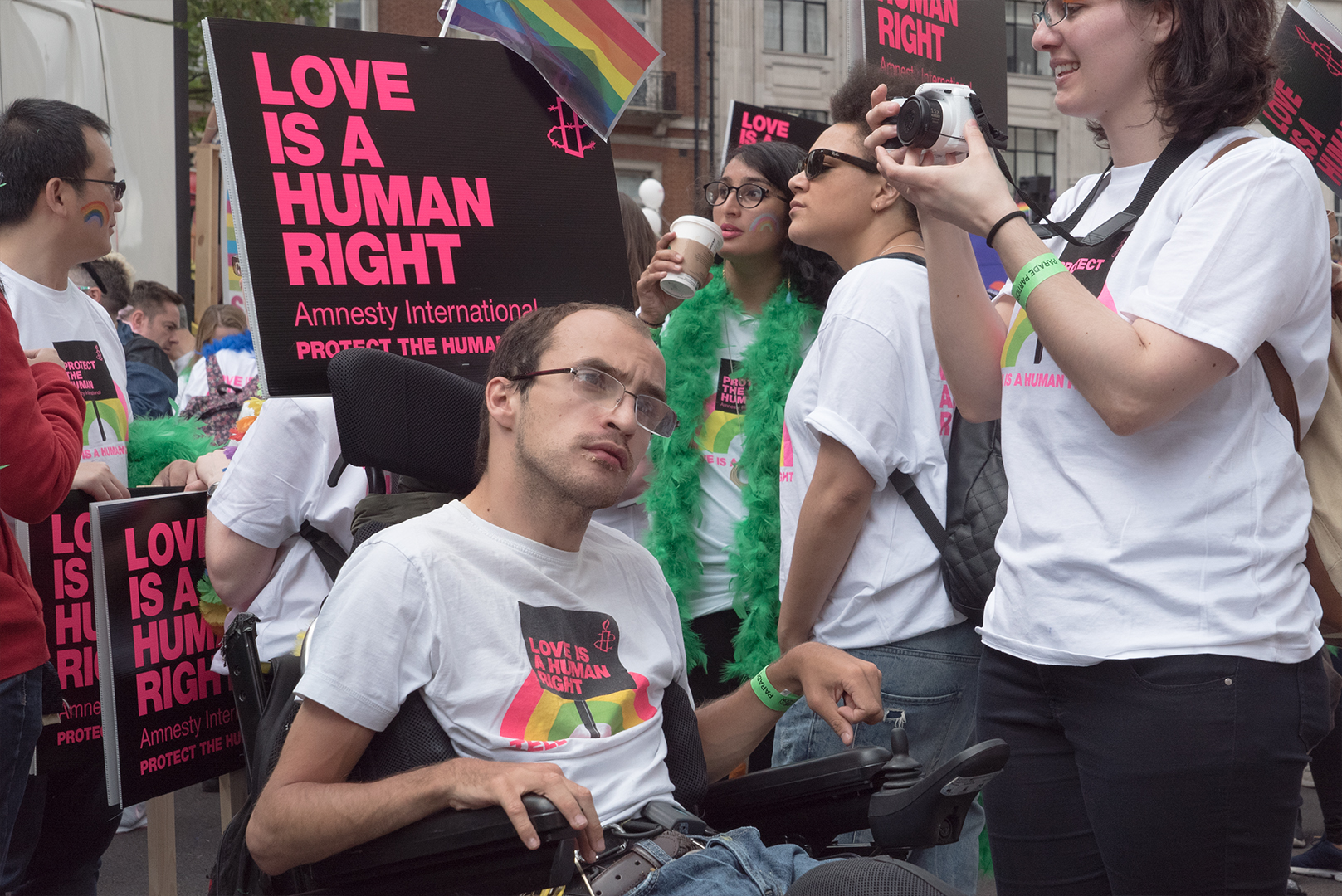
A gay man in a wheelchair at London Pride 2016

Gay men with disabilities report feelings of discomfort because of social expectations surrounding physical appearance and conventional standards of attractiveness. One man, Aaron Anderson, who has Guillain-Barre Syndrome, said, "Gay men are so conditioned to everything has to be perfect. You have to have it all. [My body] is so not perfect. The gay men I know don't know how to deal with it [my disability]. They pretend it's not a thing or superficial acquaintances will just ignore me." Gay men with disabilities also note that members of the disability community often feel desexualized by society. This desexualization can have serious ramifications for the health of gay men with disabilities. Jae Jin Pak, of the University of Illinois at Chicago, noted that accurate sexual education and sexuality-related information is generally unavailable to members of the disabled community, which can leave men in the community without information about safe-sex practices. Meanwhile, within the field of Disability studies, scholars emphasize the importance of establishing a public identity and a common culture for gay men with disabilities. In recent years, queer men with disabilities have achieved some mainstream media visibility, including through Ryan O'Connell's 2019 Netflix series Special, and the online popularity of the sexually fluid American model Nyle DiMarco.

=== Identity formation ===
A number of western scholars, including Michel Foucault, Jonathan Ned Katz, Adrienne Rich, Eve Kosofsky Sedgwick, Dennis Altman, and Walt Odets, have discussed homosexuality and the modern western LGBT identity.

In the influential book, The History of Sexuality, Michel Foucault argued that the modern homosexual identity developed in response to pressures from sources of power (medical, religious, etc.). In The Invention of Heterosexuality, Jonathan Ned Katz argued that both heterosexuality and homosexuality are historically constructed identity categories, expanding from former procreative vs. non-procreative concepts. In Out of the Shadows: Reimagining Gay Men's Lives, Walt Odets described gayness as a broader relational identity involving romantic attachment, sexuality, intimacy, gender expression, emotional life, community, and self-understanding. Odets argues that reducing the gay male identity to sex is a result of social and political conditions, including the AIDS crisis, but that "homosexual" is an inadequate means of describing gayness. Odets also noted that understandings of homosexuality vary across cultures, with some societies treating same-sex relationships or behaviors as one characteristic among others rather than as the basis of a distinct identity.

Understandings of queer identities can affect perceptions of and attitudes toward LGBT people. A 2015 study found that straight respondents assumed less love and emotional significance to gay male couples than to comparable heterosexual couples. In a separate survey experiment, the same authors found that respondents were less willing to give what they termed informal privileges (such as public displays of affection) to same-sex couples even when supporting formal legal rights such as same-sex marriage. The authors argued that attitudes toward same-sex couples were shaped by views about sexuality emotional legitimacy and relational authenticity.

== Education ==
In the United States, on average, gay men are almost twice as likely than straight men to disagree that "they feel safe at school". Gay men are 50% more likely than straight men to have a postgraduate degree, and gay men have a slightly higher high school GPA than straight and bisexual men.

== See also ==
- Bara (genre) – Gay manga
- Gay characters in fiction
- Gay literature – Literary genre
- Category:Gay male literature
- Gay male speech – Speech characteristics common among gay men
- Gay men's flags
- Gay Men of African Descent
- Gay pornography – Pornography depicting sex acts between males
- Gay sexual practices – Sexual activity between men
- History of gay men
  - History of gay men in the United States
- Homoeroticism – Sexual attraction between members of the same sex
- Homosexual behavior in animals
- Homosexuality in modern sports – LGBTQ+ issues in sports
- List of gay, lesbian or bisexual people
- Yaoi – Fiction genre depicting male same-sex relationships
