= Wayne Marshall (ethnomusicologist) =

American ethnomusicologist

Wayne Marshall is an American ethnomusicologist college professor at the Berklee College of Music

His scholarship focuses on the musical and cultural production of the Caribbean and the Americas, and their circulation in the wider world, with particular attention to digital technologies. He is currently writing a book on music, networked media and transnational youth culture. He co-edited and contributed to the book Reggaeton (Duke University Press, 2009) and has published in journals such as Popular Music and Callaloo, while writing for popular outlets including The Wire and the Boston Phoenix. Marshall holds a Ph.D. from the University of Wisconsin-Madison and has taught courses at Brandeis, Brown, University of Chicago, and MIT. He is also an active DJ.

== Background ==
Wayne Marshall was born and raised in Cambridge, Massachusetts. He specializes in the intersections between Caribbean and American popular music. He received his AB from Harvard and his doctorate from the University of Wisconsin-Madison in 2007. His dissertation, "Routes, Rap, Reggae: Hearing the Histories of Hip-hop and Reggae Together", examines the musical interplay between Jamaica and the US in the late twentieth century. He has taught at MIT (Mellon Fellow 2009–11), Brandeis (Florence Levy Kay Fellow in Ethnomusicology 2007–09), the University of Chicago, and Harvard University. As of 2020, he teaches at the Berklee College of Music.
