= Timeline of LGBTQ history in Belize =

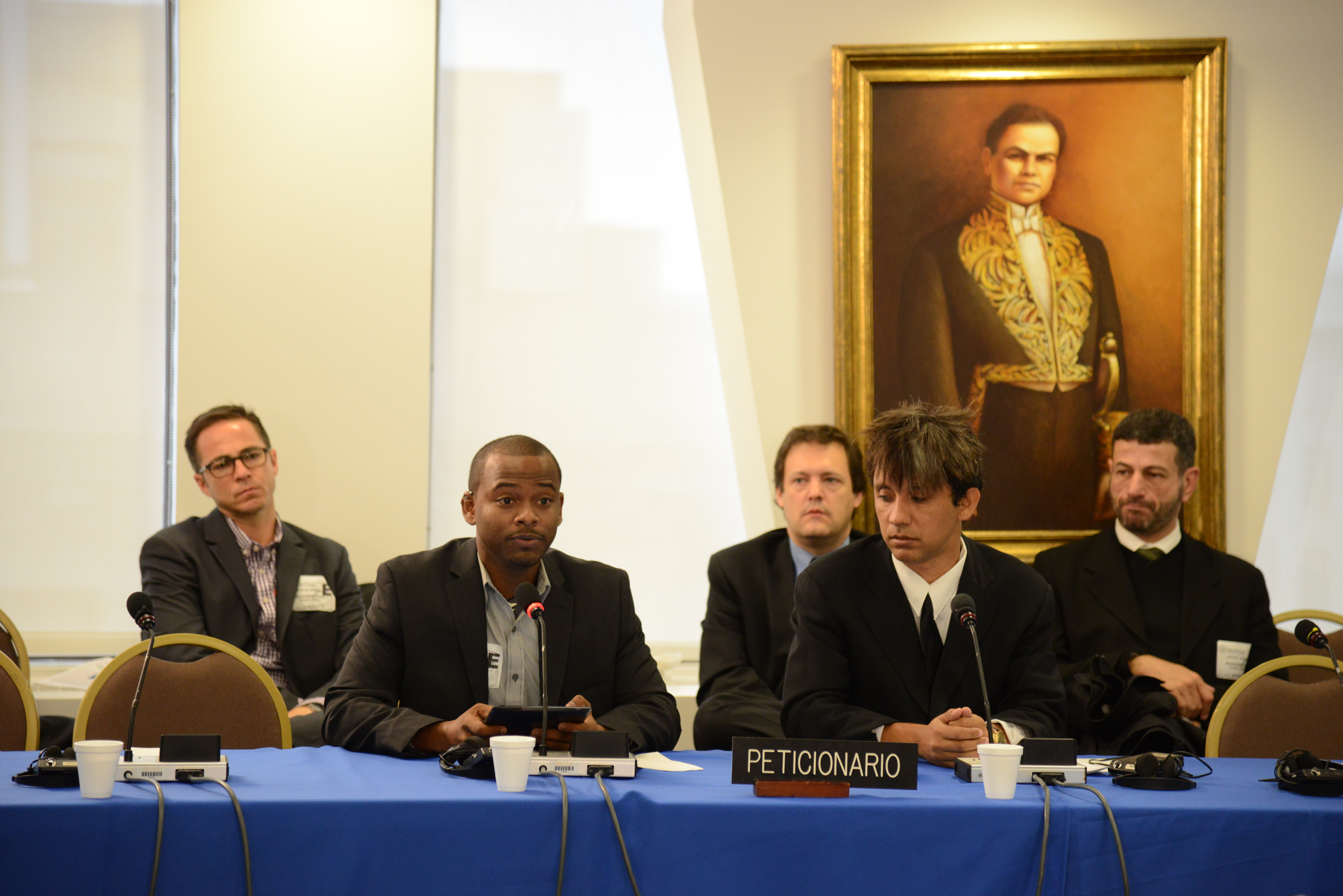
LGBTQ activists review the state of queer Belizeans at the IACHR in 2014

This timeline lists events in the history of LGBTQ (lesbian, gay, bisexual, transgender, and queer) people in what is now Belize, chronologically and with annotations. It includes: incidents of violence or harm against LGBTQ people, and any events dating to or predating the 2000s. It excludes: lesser noted events or incidents postdating the said decade.

== Prior to 21st century ==
- 1888: In Belize Town, the Criminal Code Act 1888 is passed, making unnatural carnal knowledge (buggery) a public nuisance, and thereby criminalising same-sex intercourse between consenting adults for the first time in British Honduran history.
- 1944: In Belize Town, Ordinance No 4 of 1944 is passed, making consensual same-sex intercourse an indictable offence now.
- 1981: In Belmopan, the Criminal Code Act 1981 is passed, with consensual same-sex intercourse retained as an indictable offence punishable by ten years' imprisonment.
- January 1998: In Belize City, protests erupt over the forthcoming (1 February) arrival of MS Leeward, a queer cruise.

== 21st century ==
- October 2000: In Belmopan, Belize Defence Force captain Oscar Selgado is dismissed for alleged homosexual advances towards an officer in his company in Caye Caulker.
- 16 May 2004: In Belize City, Catholic bishop Dorick Wright implies, in a public sermon, that churches that run parish schools ought to have the "right to discipline teachers and students", including queer ones, as they see fit (sans constitutional or judicial restrictions).
- 2 September 2006: In Belize City, a tear gas canister is detonated amidst Carnival goers at the Marion Jones Stadium, allegedly due to the festivities' "pervasive homosexual culture".
- 21 May 2007: The Amandala link being gay to paedophilia and to bestiality.
- 17 November 2007: In San Joaquin, Corozal, Eugenio Tzul (49) is murdered at his brother's residence for alleged homosexual advances (or sexual assault).
- 29 December 2007: In Corozal, Corozal, Kenny Elidor Ramirez (20, purportedly queer) is murdered on Ninth Street.
- 13 February 2009: In Orange Walk, Orange Walk, Enrique Castillo (44, openly gay) is murdered on the Belize-Corozal Road, allegedly by his boyfriend.
- 22 August 2009: In Belize City, Leroy Rhaburn (28) is murdered on Euphrates Avenue and Cemetery Road, allegedly upon implying that his assailant was gay.
- 1 October 2009: In Belmopan, an openly transgender teenager (19), born Jose Garcia, is expelled and required to undergo "spiritual counselling" (conversion therapy) to possibly regain admittance to the Baptist School of Adult & Continuing Education, and then threatened with arrest by principal Norman Willacey (for accessing school grounds whilst expelled).

=== 2010s ===
Queer pride was first openly celebrated in Belize in 2015

- 14 May 2010: In Belize City, Francis Figueroa (27) is murdered on Vernon Street by an assailant allegedly hurling queerphobic (and other) insults or slurs.
- 30 May 2010: In Corozal, Corozal, Elena Amador (21) is murdered on Third Street North and Sixth Avenue, allegedly for having queer friends or for attending a drag show on 29 May.
- 26 July 2010: In Carolina, Corozal, Philip Moses Hall (41, purportedly queer) is murdered off Northern Highway, allegedly over homosexual advances.
- 11 April 2011: In Piarco, Trinidad, Mia Quetzal (Belizean activist, openly transgender) is allegedly harassed by immigration officers at the Piarco International Airport.
- 18 May 2011: The Council of Churches and Association of Evangelical Churches accuse the "homosexual agenda" of "targeting our children".
- 5 June 2011: In Santa Elena, Cayo, the Star (local newspaper) call on readers to join Belize Action "against the homosexual agenda".
- June 2011: In Belmopan, Belize Action call on Belizeans to "stand up against the homosexual agenda".
- 13 September 2011: In Belmopan, Minister of Works Anthony Martinez states, of Section 53 of the Criminal Code Act 1981, that "that is a law made from the Bible ... God made a man and a woman, man has what woman wants, and woman has what man wants, it’s as simple as that. I’ll fight tooth and nail to keep that law" (queerphobic not Adam and Steve trope).
- November 2011: In Belize City, Belize Action protest the UNIBAM case.
- 28 November 2011: In Orange Walk, Orange Walk, the Northern Star (local newspaper) call local queer activists and allies "anti-Belizean".
- 9 December 2011: The Amandala accuse UNIBAM of "divid[ing] Belize".
- December 2011: The Amandala, Plus TV, and Christian right groups (including Vision Inspired by the People) protest a Ministry of Education and US Peace Corps teacher's manual for "promoting ... the homosexual agenda" to primary school students (queerphobic grooming trope).
- 8 February 2012: In Belize City, Caleb Orozco (38) is verbally and physically assaulted (broken teeth, severe facial bruising) by a mob of men on Dean and West Streets.
- 18 June 2012: In Belize City, Ivan Garcia (52, physician, purportedly queer) is murdered on Guava Street, allegedly by his boyfriend or over homosexual advances.
- 8 September 2012: In Belmopan, the Domestic Banks & Financial Institutions Act 2012 is passed, sparking Christian right opposition over the possibility that married same-sex couples might be recognised as spouses within the meaning of the Act (given its language).
- 23 November 2012: In Belize City, the Council of Churches protest the UNIBAM case.
- 3 December 2012: In Belize City, the Council of Churches protest the UNIBAM case.
- 8 December 2012: In Santa Elena, Cayo, Carla Pamela Perez (34, purportedly queer) is murdered on Carillo Puerto Avenue, allegedly by her girlfriend.
- December 2012: In Belize City, Maurice Tomlinson (Jamaican activist, openly queer) declines a UNIBAM workshop invitation over fears of being barred entry due to Section 5 of the Immigration Act 2010.
- 8 May 2013: In Belize City, Caleb Orozco (39) receives death threats and has his residence and vehicle vandalised and burgled.
- May 2013: In Belmopan, Oceana VP Audrey Matura-Shepherd links being gay to bestiality in her Amandala column.
- May 2013: In Belmopan, government introduce a revised gender policy (purportedly for gender equity), sparking Christian right opposition over their alleged "bending to the agenda of the LGBT population in Belize".
- July 2013: The Christian right hold nationwide anti-queer marches (Orange Walk on 2 July, Punta Gorda on 5 July, Cayo on 9 July, Dangriga on 13 July, Belize on 16 July, Corozal on 20 July), and in at least one such, parade with a hanged effigy labelled UNIBAM.
- 20 July 2013: In Orange Walk, Orange Walk, the Miss Gay Goddess Belize pageant is forced to relocate to a private venue in Belize City over safety concerns.
- 20 August 2013: In Belmopan, Belize Can protest the UNIBAM case and a purported plan by the University of Belize to open a gender studies department.
- October 2013: In Belmopan, a Criminal Code Act amendment is considered in committee, prompting Christian right opposition over fears it might decriminalise consensual same-sex intercourse.
- 12 January 2014: In Belize City, Cenida Ramos (18, openly transgender) is murdered on Elston Kerr Street.
- 3 March 2014: In Belize City, Catholic bishop Dorick Wright blacklists various NGOs (including UNIBAM) from parish schools due to their "agenda of sodomy, abortion, and sexual gender redefinition" (queerphobic gay agenda trope, possibly).
- 4 March 2014: In Belize City, Catholic bishop Dorick Wright denounces a forthcoming (6 March) women's rally over fears it is part of a "wider agenda" for "abortion and same-sex relations" (queerphobic gay agenda trope, possibly).
- 8 April 2014: In Belize City, Vanessa Champagne Paris (18, openly transgender) is stoned and injured by a mob of men on Vernon Street.
- 23 May 2014: In Belize City, Belize Action and the Christian right protest the ousting of Brendon Bain (University of the West Indies professor) due to backlash after his UNIBAM case deposition (where he made allegedly queerphobic remarks).
- 10 June 2014: In Belmopan, Vanessa Champagne Paris (19, openly transgender) is robbed and allegedly harassed on Ambergris Avenue.
- 17 June 2014: In Belmopan, Belize Can protest government's gender policy (purportedly introduced for gender equity).
- 24 June 2014: In Belmopan, Belize Can protest US ambassador to Belize Carlos Moreno for their apparent queer-friendly stance or attitude.
- 5 August 2014: In Belize City, Caleb Orozco (40) is verbally and physically assaulted by a neighbour on Ziricote Street.
- 19 August 2014: The Amandala blame Caleb Orozco and UNIBAM for recent attacks on queer people in Southside (neighbourhood), noting "in the streets, our position is that we will do what we have to do when we have to do it".
- 18 June 2015: In San Pedro, Belize, Caribbean Villas (local resort hotel) announce queer pride celebrations for 5–12 September, sparking backlash from the Christian right.
- 3 June 2016: In Independence, Stann Creek, Vanessa Champagne Paris (21, openly transgender) dies of (allegedly intentional) food poisoning after a 1 June visit to Dangriga, Stann Creek.
- 12 June 2016: In Belize City, a Buttonwood Bay Medical Centre pharmacist (amongst other Facebook users, reportedly) calls the Pulse nightclub shooting "justified" (in a public post).
- 23 June 2016: In Belmopan, the US Embassy hoist a rainbow flag, sparking backlash from the Christian right, including the Evangelical Association (former Association of Evangelical Churches).
- June 2016: In Belmopan, the National Youth Council (a recognised youth council) remove gender as a protected class from their constitution, over fears "the term was too open to interpretation", after which Jamal Swaso (Council district president for Stann Creek) posts an allegedly queerphobic meme on Facebook.
- 10 August 2016: In Belize City, the High Court rule in favour of Caleb Orozco in the UNIBAM case, prompting Christian right backlash and protests (Belmopan on 23 and 26 and 30 August), including from various civil society groups (unions, political parties, and others).
- 17 August 2016: In Belize City, Noel Garcia (39, purportedly queer) is physically assaulted on North Front Street, allegedly by his boyfriend.
- 22 October 2016: In Belmopan, House Speaker Michael Peyrefitte calls for tolerance ("if you can take a six inch **** in your *** then you can take this song in your soul") of Buju Banton's "Boom Bye Bye", a song explicitly calling for battymen to be shot and killed.
- November 2016: In Belmopan, Minister of Youth Patrick Faber threatens to rescind the 2016 Youth Award bestowed upon Derricia Castillo (Belize Defence Force lieutenant, queer activist) for allegedly claiming they had been honoured "for their work with the LGBT community".
- 19 December 2016: In New York, US, Belize vote to appoint Vitit Muntarbhorn as the first UN expert on sexual orientation and gender identity, sparking backlash from Belize Action.
- January 2017: In Belmopan, the Evangelical Association petition US president-elect Donald Trump for a US ambassador to Belize who "is more for family values, Biblical family views, man and woman" (queerphobic not Adam and Steve trope).
- February 2017: In San Pedro, Belize, Jose Felix Ayuso (44, beauty salon proprietor, HIV/AIDS activist) is murdered on Jew Fish and Seaweed Streets for alleged homosexual advances (or sexual assault).
- 21 June 2017: In Belmopan, the US Embassy hoist a rainbow flag, sparking backlash from the Christian right, including the Evangelical Association.
- October 2017: In Petion-Ville, Haiti, "several" queer Haitians are denied visitor visas to Belize, allegedly because their applications "were dropped off by a trans[gender individual]".
- April 2018: In Belize City, stevedore activist Raymond Rivers disrupts (shouting, chair-slamming) a talk by attorney Lisa Shoman at the Christian Workers' Union AGM, allegedly due to its queer-friendly topic or content.
- 25 September 2018: In Ontario, Cayo, Gerardo Vasquez (17) goes missing and is apparently murdered (his severed legs are found down the Belize River a few days later), the latter allegedly for being gay.
- 30 June 2019: In Caye Caulker, Ralph Gillett (Belize Police Department constable, purportedly queer) is allegedly brutalised by police (unsanctioned sleeper hold) and verbally harassed (queerphobic slurs) by onlooking passengers during an altercation in a water taxi.
- October 2019: In Belize City, a purportedly queer man caught being intimate with another man is allegedly beaten (bludgeoned, punched, kicked) by a third man in St Martin de Porres (neighbourhood).
- 4 November 2019: In Orange Walk, Orange Walk, Emil Escalante (27, openly queer) is beaten (struck over the head), possibly contributing to his two-month coma and 9 January death at the Northern Regional Hospital from cerebral toxoplasmosis.
- 30 December 2019: In Belize City, the Court of Appeal uphold the High Court's ruling in the UNIBAM case, sparking backlash from the Christian right, including the Evangelical Association.

=== 2020s ===
- 12 January 2020: In Orange Walk, Orange Walk, the grave of Emil Escalante (27, decedent, openly queer), in the San Antonio Road cemetery, is desecrated (vandalised, body exhumed).
- January 2020: In Belmopan, government propose the Equal Opportunities Bill, sparking backlash from the Christian right (including the Evangelical Association) for their inclusion of the queer community as a protected class.
- 5 April 2020: In Belize City, Ulysease Roca Terry (25, fashion designer, purportedly queer) is allegedly brutalised by police (seemingly queerphobic) whilst detained at the Racoon Street Police Station, possibly contributing to their 19 April death in Willows Bank, Belize.
- July 2020: In Belmopan, attorneys Lisa Shoman and Westmin James (who had represented Caleb Orozco in the UNIBAM case) are appointed to the High Court, sparking backlash from the Evangelical Association for their apparent queer-friendly stance or attitude.
- 28 February 2021: In Belize City, Joshua Flowers (22, purportedly queer) is shot with a rubber bullet by police, who do not rush him to hospital.
- 15 July 2021: In San Pedro, Belize, Shanira Perez (Our Circle employee) is stabbed at a queer pride event on Seagrape Drive, allegedly by a colleague.
- January 2022: In Belmopan, Minister of Religious Affairs Henry Charles Usher states their newly created portfolio will "merg[e] the public service with ... Christian fundamental principles".
- 19 December 2022: In San Pedro, Belize, Aron Castillo (28) is allegedly beaten by three men hurling queerphobic slurs in San Pedrito (neighbourhood).
- January 2023: In Belize City, Tanya Lopez (37, purportedly queer) is allegedly harassed and physically assaulted "for several months" by neighbours on King Street, whereupon police refuse to file a report.
- 20 August 2023: In San Ignacio, Cayo, Kelvin Hernandez (16) is shot and killed, and Joseph Budna (43) shot and injured, at the latter's farm and residence on Branch Mouth Road, ostensibly whilst Budna engaged in consensual intercourse (or sexually assaulted) the former.
- January 2024: A seemingly mentally-handicapped man is harassed (including queerphobic slurs) by several policemen at a police station.
- 10 July 2024: In Belize City, Joseph Budna (43) is allegedly verbally and physically assaulted by a queerphobic guard at the Novelo's Bus Terminal.
- 26 March 2025: In Belmopan, the People's Constitution Commission circulate their proposed recommendations, some of which allegedly (per UNIBAM) are "filled with religious propaganda that mirrors white conservative values in the US" (like white nationalism) and "further marginalises the LGBT population [amongst others]" (as in queerphobic discrimination).

== See also ==
- LGBTQ rights in Belize
- LGBTQ charities in Belize

== Notes and references ==
=== References ===
1. OUT in Belize (Report). ReportOUT. 2024.
2. EYBM/UNIBAM/PETAL submission for the 4th UN UPR for Belize (Report). 2023.
3. Orozco C (2 May 2021). Barriers to justice: LGBT systemic violence report (Report). UNIBAM.
4. Orozco C (31 March 2021). Situational analysis of investigative practices in law enforcement that undermine justice in Belize (Report). UNIBAM.
