= Orozco v Attorney General =

Belize High Court case decided in 2016

- Court: Supreme Court of Belize
- Full case name: Caleb Orozco v the Attorney General of Belize
- Started: 24 September 2010
- Decided: 10 August 2016
- Citations: 90 WIR 161; [2016] BZSC 63 (Note: Neutral citation by CommonLII.); Claim No 668 of 2010 (Note: Neutral citation by the Belizean judiciary.)

Case history
- Prior action: None
- Appealed to: Court of Appeal of Belize
- Subsequent action: Claim No 32 of 2016 (30 Dec 2019)

Court membership
- Judges sitting: Kenneth Benjamin, Michelle Arana

Case opinions
- Judgment in favour of claimant, as Criminal Code Act 1981 section 53 is found to breach Constitution Act 1981 sections 3, 6, 12, 16 to the extent that it applied to consensual same-sex intercourse
- Decision by: Kenneth Benjamin

Keywords
- buggery law; LGBTQ rights; constitutional law

Orozco v Attorney General (2016) 90 WIR 161, abbreviated Orozco v AG, and known in lay terms as the Orozco or UNIBAM case, was a leading case before the Supreme Court of Belize, which held that a long-standing buggery statute breached constitutional rights to dignity, equality before the law, freedom of expression, privacy, and non-discrimination on grounds of sex, and which declared the Act null and void to the applicable extent. The decision decriminalised consensual same-sex intercourse for the first time in 127 years of Belizean history, and established that the constitutional right to non-discrimination on grounds of sex extended to sexual orientation.

== Background ==
Buggery was first criminalised in British Honduras by the Criminal Code Act 1888, brought into force on 15 December 1888, and providing that: "Whoever is convicted of unnatural carnal knowledge of any person, with force or without the consent of such person, shall be liable to imprisonment with hard labour for life, and in the discretion of the Court to flogging". This first statute, nonetheless, classified consensual buggery as a public nuisance, rather than an indictable offence. However, Ordinance Number 4 of 1944 removed the distinction, making both consensual and non-consensual same-sex intercourse an offence. The ordinance's wording was substantially retained in section 53 of the Criminal Code Act 1981 (the Criminal Code), which provided that: "Every Person who has carnal intercourse against the order of nature with any person or animal shall be liable to imprisonment for ten years".

Caleb Orozco, then-president of the United Belize Advocacy Movement (UNIBAM), first contemplated litigation before the Supreme Court (the High Court) during a conversation with two law professors of the UWI Rights Advocacy Project, while at a 2009 conference on HIV/AIDS in Jamaica. The professors hoped to lay "the groundwork for a test case [which], if successful, could encourage similar legal challenges in neighboring countries", and considered Belize an "ideal" jurisdiction, as its Constitution Act 1981 (the Constitution) "had stronger personal privacy and equality protections than [that of] other Caribbean countries".

== Facts ==
Orozco "is a Belizean national who has faced violence, persecution and discrimination since he came out to his family when he was fifteen years of age". Orozco and UNIBAM jointly filed civil suit against the Attorney General on 24 September 2010. The claimants sought, principally, a finding declaring section 53 of the Criminal Code null and void and of no effect as regards private carnal intercourse between consenting persons, in so far as it contravened constitutional rights to dignity, privacy, and equal protection under the law, as enshrined in sections 3, 6, and 14 of the Constitution, respectively. UNIBAM were found to lack standing in 2011, and so removed as claimants, but admitted as an interested party for Orozco. Contemporaneously, the Commonwealth Lawyers Association, Human Dignity Trust, and International Commission of Jurists were admitted as interested parties for the claimant, while the Roman Catholic Diocese, Anglican Diocese, and Evangelical Association of Churches were admitted as interested parties for the defendant. Oral arguments were heard during 7–10 May 2013.

In support of their claim, Orozco deposed to an affidavit as follows.

Even though I am an adult and the expression of my sexuality is consensual and conducted in private with other adults and is therefore not harmful to others, my worth and dignity as a human being and value as a member of society are not recognised. Indeed, my constitutional rights to dignity, equality, freedom of expression and privacy are violated by criminalising the free expression of my sexuality and, worse, having my sexuality linked with sexual practices involving animals. Further, the general prejudice and abusive conduct of the public which the law engenders and encourages affects my right to express my human sexuality and to establish and nurture relationships with consenting male partners without outside interference.

The claimant, and their interested parties and expert witnesses, further brought to bear evidence on the role the challenged statute played in the stigma, violence, and negative health outcomes experienced by queer nationals.

In opposition to the claim, the defendant and their interested parties first challenged the claimant's standing, arguing that the latter had not demonstrated past, present, nor likely future prosecution under the Criminal Code, as required by section 20 of the Constitution. The court, however, following Dudgeon v UK and Tan Eng Hong v AG, rejected this argument, noting the claimant "perpetually [ran] the risk of being prosecuted". The parties next challenged the court's authority and cogency as to the judicial review of an Act of Parliament. The court likewise rejected this challenge, following Nadan & McCoskar v The State (Note: Nadan & McCoskar v The State cited as [2005] FJHC 500.), further noting, "the Supreme Court is the designated guardian of the rights conferred under the Constitution. It cannot shirk from such responsibility by asserting that any change to legislation is matter best left to the legislature. To do so would be to act in defiance of the mandate of the Constitution itself".

In interpreting the constitutional Act, Chief Justice Benjamin stated (in their opinion) that "the plain language of the Constitution must be given a liberal and purposive interpretation". Furthermore, noting its provenance from Universal Declaration of Human Rights via the European Convention on Human Rights, and following AG v Joseph (Note: AG v Jeffery Joseph et al cited as CCJ Appeal No CV2 of 2005.), Boyce v R, and R v Lewis (Note: R v Lewis cited as (2007) 70 WIR 75.), the Chief Justice held that constitutional interpretation may or ought to be informed by the jurisprudence of international bodies. The parts of the Constitution which were pertinent to the claim, namely sections 3, 6, 11, 12, 14, and 16, were therefore examined in accordance with the aforementioned principles.

=== Timeline ===
- 24 September 2010: UNIBAM and Caleb Orozco lodge their claim against the Attorney General in the High Court.
- 11 April 2011: The Commonwealth Lawyers Association, Human Dignity Trust, and International Commission of Jurists are admitted as interested parties for the claimants.
- 17 May 2011: The Catholic Diocese, Anglican Diocese, and Evangelical Association of Churches are admitted as interested parties for the defendant.
- 17 October 2011: UNIBAM are stricken as claimants.
- 8 December 2011: UNIBAM are admitted as an interested party for the claimant.
- 7 May 2013 – 10 May 2013: Oral arguments are heard.
- 10 August 2016: Judgment is delivered via judicial opinion by Chief Justice Kenneth Benjamin.

== Judgment ==
Section 53 of the Criminal Code was, first, held to be in breach of the claimant's right to dignity and so in violation of section 3 of the Constitution, here following Law v Canada and NCGLE v Minister of Justice. Significantly, the constitutional right to privacy, conferred by section 14 of the latter Act, was held to be "associated with" and to "emanat[e] from the concept of human dignity" (section 3). However, section 14 further exempts Acts from being deemed unconstitutional "to the extent that the law in question makes reasonable provision that is required in the interests of ... public morality" (a savings clause). The defendant and their interested parties, however, were unable to demonstrate that the buggery provision of section 53 was required in the interest of public morality, resulting in the section's being deemed non-exempt by the savings clause of section 14, here following Dudgeon v UK, Reyes v R, Lawrence v Texas, and O'Sullivan v MNR (Note: G O'Sullivan v MNR (No 2) cited as [1991] 2 CTC 117.). Accordingly, section 53 was likewise held to be in breach of the claimant's right to privacy and so in violation of section 14. Finally, section 53 was held to be in breach of the claimant's right to equality before the law and so in violation of section 6 of the Constitution, and further, of section 16 of the same, here following Toonen v Australia. Significantly, in this last finding, the court interpreted the word "sex" in section 16 to extend to sexual orientation, following the UN Human Rights Committee interpretation of the same in articles 2 and 26 of the International Covenant on Civil and Political Rights, to which Belize acceded subsequent to Toonen.

Consequently, the court found in favour of the claimant as follows.

It is hereby declared that section 53 of the Belize Criminal Code, Chapter 101 (Note: Of the Substantive Laws of Belize.), contravenes sections 3, 6, 12 and 16 of the Belize Constitution to the extent that it applies to carnal intercourse against the order of nature between persons ... It is therefore ordered that the following sentence be added to section 53 of the Criminal Code, Chapter 101: "This section shall not apply to consensual sexual acts between adults in private."

The court further awarded the claimant "costs fit for two Senior Counsel".

== Reactions ==
The decision was welcomed by local and regional queer organisations, as well as international human rights bodies. It has been commended by scholars for bringing Belizean law "within the purview of international human rights". Orozco, in particular, has been praised for placing his "safety on the line to fight for equality".

=== Criticism ===
Various aspects of the case were critiqued. The court's finding that UNIBAM lacked standing was criticised in scholarly and lay literature. The court's unusual delay was likewise noted. The little attention paid, in the written opinion, to the relationship between freedom of expression and the buggery statute has been called "unfortunate", given that this might "undermine its [the case's] usefulness in other litigation around the Caribbean".

Various interested parties, and in particular, their acceptance of foreign aid or advice, were also criticised outside of court. Human Dignity Trust "received harsh criticism in Belize because the article [announcing their involvement as an interested party in 2011] did not make it clear that the case had already been initiated by Belizean lawyers with a legal strategy developed by a local organisation". Belize Action, a Christian right group which opposed decriminalisation, denounced the involvement of overseas persons and organisations in favour of the claimants, but were themselves charged with hypocrisy for receiving foreign aid. Various other Christian right groups similarly echoed Belize Action, calling foreign involvement an instance of neocolonialism, but have likewise been flagged as foreign aid recipients themselves, with their condemnations deemed hypocritical diversion tactics. Notably, then-Prime Minister, Dean Barrow, expressed regret over the case's divisiveness, stating, "one of the things that we have to be grateful for in this country is [that] the culture wars we see in the United States have not been imported into Belize ... this is the start of exactly such a phenomenon".

=== Opposition ===
The case was vigorously opposed in the court of public opinion by the Christian right and other socially conservative entities in the country. For instance, the editor-in-chief of Amandala, Russell Vellos, notably stated, "homosexuals are predators of young and teenaged boys ... Woe unto us, Belize, if homosexuals are successful in our court. Woe unto us! In fact, since ours is a ‘test case,’ woe unto the world!"

On 26 November 2014, the Association of Evangelical Churches called for a national referendum on the question of whether section 53 of the Criminal Code should be retained, it being believed that the section would "remain intact because a majority of the citizenry share[d] the [Association's] views that it [was] necessary to upold [the section] in order to secure the morals and values of the society, and specifically to prevent the legislation of same-sex marriage".

=== Appeals ===
The Attorney General, in AG v Orozco, appealed the High Court's ruling on sections 12 and 16 of the Constitution. Notably, government did not appeal the decriminalisation itself, findings regarding sections 3, 6, and 14, nor the court's exercise of judicial review. Oral arguments concluded on 29 October 2018, and appellate judgment was delivered on 30 December 2019. The Court of Appeal upheld the High Court's findings on both sections 12 and 16, and significantly, reaffirmed that the term "sex" in the Constitution encompasses sexual orientation, thereby becoming "the first appellate tribunal in the Caribbean to reach these conclusions". This decision became final when it was not appealed to the Caribbean Court of Justice within the allotted time.

The Catholic Diocese appealed the judgment separately, but on all, rather than limited, grounds. In March 2018, after missing several deadlines, they withdrew their appeal.

== Legacy ==
Orozco v AG was the first challenge to Belize's buggery statute since its introduction in 1888, and the first instance of the judicial review of such law in the Commonwealth Caribbean. The judgment made Belize the second country in the region to decriminalise consensual same-sex intercourse, after The Bahamas. The case is considered a landmark, and has been cited as possible precedent for peer countries.

== See also ==
- LGBTQ rights in Belize
- LGBTQ history in Belize
- Tomlinson v Belize – concurrent LGBTQ rights case

== Notes and references ==
=== References ===
1. Orozco v Attorney General [2016] BZSC 63
2. "Caleb Orozco v The Attorney General of Belize, et al". Claim No. 668 of 2010. Belize City: Supreme Court. 10 August 2016. Cited (2016) 90 WIR 161. Archived from the original on 28 November 2022.
3. "Attorney General v Caleb Orozco and others". News, cases & analysis. London: Blackstone Chambers. 30 December 2019.
4. "Orozco v Attorney General of Belize (Belize Court of Appeal, 29 October 2018)". News. Bristol: Commonwealth Lawyers Association. 22 November 2018.
5. "What is Happening With the Caleb Orozco Case?" (Pamphlet). Belize City: Our Circle. 29 December 2019.
6. "Belize: A constitutional challenge to the laws criminalising same-sex activity". What we do: Strategic litigation. London: Human Dignity Trust.
7. Beirich, Heidi (10 July 2013). Dangerous Liaisons (Report). Montgomery, AL: Southern Poverty Law Center.
8. Evans, Christine M. (2013). "Challenging "Unnatural Crimes": The Connection between LGBTI Rights and Gender-Specific Sexual Violence Laws in Belize". Northwestern Journal of International Human Rights. 11 (2): 189–206.
9. James, Westmin R. A. (2018a). "In search of progress: the implications of Caleb Orozco v. AG of Belize for the Commonwealth Caribbean". International Journal of Human Rights. 22 (5): 640–663. doi:10.1080/13642987.2017.1408590. S2CID 149124492.
10. James, Westmin R. A. (2018b). "Privacy in Commonwealth Caribbean law: emerging trends in the protection of sexual citizenship". Commonwealth Law Bulletin. 44 (2): 237–250. doi:10.1080/03050718.2019.1605918. S2CID 151152773.
11. Lazarus, Latoya (2020). "Enacting citizenship, debating sex and sexuality: conservative Christians' participation in legal processes in Jamaica and Belize". Commonwealth & Comparative Politics. 58 (3): 366–386. doi:10.1080/14662043.2020.1773115. S2CID 221065852.
12. Nicol, Nancy; Jjuuko, Adrian; Lusimbo, Richard; Mulé, Nick J.; Ursel, Susan; Wahab, Amar; Waugh, Phyllis, eds. (2018). Envisioning Global LGBT Human Rights: (Neo)colonialism, Neoliberalism, Resistance and Hope. London: University of London Press. ISBN 9780993110238. JSTOR j.ctv5132j6.
13. Scott, Julia (24 May 2015). "The Lonely Fight Against Belize's Antigay Laws". New York Times Magazine (Sunday ed.). p. 24.
14. Tisdale, Lauren (2018). "A Triumphant Victory for Gay Rights in Belize Lays the Foundation for a Domino Effect Throughout the Caribbean". Loyola of Los Angeles International and Comparative Law Review. 41 (1): 99–123. ISSN 0277-5417.
15. Waites, Matthew (2019). "Decolonizing the boomerang effect in global queer politics: A new critical framework for sociological analysis of human rights contestation". International Sociology. 34 (4): 382–401. doi:10.1177/0268580919851425. S2CID 198731134.
16. Zeldin, Wendy (19 August 2016). "Belize: Anti-Homosexuality Legal Provision Struck Down for First Time in Caribbean". Global Legal Monitor. Washington, DC: Library of Congress.
