= Killing of Cenida Ramos =

Belize homicide in 2014

- Close-up of Cenida Ramos
- Date: 12 January 2014
- Time: c. 1:30 am CT
- Location: Elston Kerr Street, Belize City, Belize; 17.49549°N 88.20045°W
- Type: Homicide (official), hate crime (possible), crime of passion (possible)
- Motive: Armed robbery (official), transphobia (possible)
- Deaths: 1 (Ramos)
- Arrests: 0
- Suspects: 2 male cyclists (unidentified)
- Convicted: 0

At about 1:30 am CT on 12 January 2014, two unknown male suspects on bicycles allegedly stabbed and killed Cenida Ramos, (Note: Some sources refer to Ramos by her deadname, Joseph Sanchez, claim she called herself Prince Joe, use he/him pronouns for her, or label her a crossdresser or drag queen (rather than a transgender woman). Both UNIBAM and Belize Trans Colours (local queer rights organisations) label her a transgender woman, referring to her by her chosen name of Cenida Ramos (in).) an 18-year-old transgender woman, on Elston Kerr Street in Southside, Belize City, Belize. Police, investigating the crime as a murder, claimed the motive was armed robbery, but family and LGBTQ rights organisations disputed this, alleging it had been a hate crime. Ramos is thought to be first openly transgender individual murdered in Belize. As of 2023, the case remained unsolved.

== Background ==
Belize is a particularly hostile place for members of its queer community, and especially for transgender individuals, who face severe transphobia in nearly all aspects of their lives. Cenida Ramos, an openly transgender 18-year-old, for instance, would often brave verbal and even physical harassment while out and about.

== Killing ==
Ramos headed out of her house (on Laura Dunn Street) on foot at about 1:00 am CT on 12 January 2014, after having received a phone call ostensibly inviting her to a late-night party. At approximately 1:50 am, police came across her lifeless body, sprawled face down on the sidewalk of Elston Kerr Street in Southside, Belize City, with two fatal stab wounds to the chest. CCTV footage showed Ramos pacing up and down the street near Lord's Ridge Cemetery and Gwen Lizarraga High School when two male suspects on bicycles rode up and seemingly tried to rob her at about 1:30 am. Ramos is seen putting up a fight, after which one assailant stabs her in the chest with a butcher knife, whereupon Ramos runs from them and collapses a short distance away, while the alleged robbers make their escape. Ramos was pronounced dead on arrival at the Karl Heusner Memorial Hospital at 2:47 am.

== Aftermath ==
Family believed Ramos had been lured to her death, given the phone call she had received before heading out, and given that (according to friends) she had been receiving death threats for the past week from a former dating prospect. UNIBAM, a local queer rights group, noted the stabbing may have rather been a hate crime, given Ramos had been "a popular and flamboyant member of the local LGBTQ community". Police believed the motive had simply been attempted robbery, but were investigating the crime as a murder. As of June 2023, the case remained unsolved.

Ramos's killing is thought to be the first instance in the country of an openly transgender individual being murdered. UNIBAM condemned the crime as a "vicious, senseless and inhumane killing", noting that "when there are no laws to protect or even acknowledge the existence of a subset of our population [transgender people], this kind of crime can easily occur with little justice". They urged the public to "refuse to allow this heinous crime to go silent," asking them to "talk about it and how we don't want to live in a Belize where someone can be murdered for the kind of clothes they wear". Aria Lightfoot, a local commentator, similarly denounced the murder, further excoriating members of the public who blamed Ramos for her own death. Jen Psaki (US State) also condemned the "brutal killing", noting "no one should be subjected to violence because of who they are or who they love". In April 2014, UNIBAM cited Ramos at the Inter-American Commission on Human Rights as proof of the urgent need for hate crime legislation in Belize, and commemorated her for the 2015 International Day Against Homophobia, Biphobia and Transphobia. In their 2023 submission for the country's fourth UN Universal Periodic Review, Belize Trans Colours noted police still had "no enforceable internal policy to deal with trans victims of violence", emphasising that Ramos's case still remained unresolved.

== See also ==
- Anti-LGBTQ violence in Belize
- List of people killed for being transgender
- LGBTQ youth vulnerability
- Dwayne Jones – 2013 LGBTQ murder victim in Jamaica

== Notes and references ==
=== References ===
1. "UNIBAM president says murder was a hate crime". News 5. 13 January 2014.
2. "3 murders in the City: Cross-dresser killed on Elston Kerr Street". News 5. 13 January 2014.
3. "18 year old transgender youth killed, was it a hate crime?". 7 News. 13 January 2014.
4. "Police say cross dresser 'Prince Joe' was robbed". 7 News. 14 January 2014.
5. "Cross-dresser stabbed dead". Amandala. 14 January 2014.
6. "UNIBAM denounces hate crime in Belize". Ambergris Today. 14 January 2014.
7. "UNIBAM statement on alleged 'hate crime'". West Vision. 14 January 2014.
8. "A look at the possible motive for Joseph Sanchez's murder". News 5. 14 January 2014.
9. "Hate crime vs hate incident and Joseph Sanchez". UNIBAM. 14 January 2014.
10. "Gay teen murdered in Belize". Twocanview. 15 January 2014.
11. "Killing of Joseph Sanchez, an LGBT Teenager in Belize" (Press release). US State. 16 January 2014.
12. "U.S. issues a statement on the murder of cross-dresser, Joseph Sanchez". News 5. 17 January 2014.
13. "US State Department shows respect to 'Prince Joe'". 7 News. 14 January 2014.
14. "UNIBAM challenges Belize at OAS human rights commission hearing". Amandala. 4 April 2014.
15. "Belize IDAHOT 2015: LGBT youth, social complications, quiet resistance". UNIBAM. 17 May 2015.
16. BTC Submission to the UN UPR for Belize (Report). 29 July 2023.
