= Tomlinson v Belize & Trinidad and Tobago =

Caribbean Court of Justice case decided in 2016

- Court: Caribbean Court of Justice
- Full case name: Maurice Tomlinson v the State of Belize and v the State of Trinidad and Tobago
- Started: 31 May 2013
- Decided: 10 June 2016
- Citations: [2016] CCJ 1 (OJ) (Note: Neutral citation by the Caribbean Court of Justice.); [2016] CariCJ 12 (Note: Neutral citation by CommonLII.)

Case history
- Prior action: None
- Subsequent action: None
- Related action: [2014] CCJ 2 (OJ) (8 May 2014)

Court membership
- Judges sitting: Dennis Byron, Rolston Nelson, Adrian Saunders, Jacob Wit, Winston Anderson

Case opinions
- Case dismissed, but CARICOM free movement upheld, regardless of LGBTQ identity and local statutes to the contrary
- Decision by: Per curiam

Keywords
- LGBTQ rights; free movement; immigration law; international law

Maurice Tomlinson sued Belize and Trinidad and Tobago to strike down laws barring entry to homosexuals

Tomlinson v Belize & Trinidad and Tobago (Note: Also Tomlinson v Trinidad and Tobago & Belize, Tomlinson v Belize, Tomlinson v the State of Belize, Tomlinson v Trinidad and Tobago, Tomlinson v the State of Trinidad and Tobago.) (2016) was a high-profile case in the Caribbean Court of Justice in Port of Spain, Trinidad, regarding LGBTQ rights and free movement within the Caribbean Community. Maurice Tomlinson, a Jamaican LGBTQ rights activist, filed suit against those member states, namely Belize and Trinidad and Tobago, whose Immigration Acts contained language explicitly barring entry to homosexuals. Tomlinson sought to strike down said provisions. The Court ruled against Tomlinson, but further held that LGBTQ nationals of the Caribbean Community were entitled to the same free movement that non-LGBTQ nationals were, regardless of statutory language in domestic law to the contrary.

== Background ==
The Caribbean Court of Justice (CCJ; the Court) is vested with a unique double jurisdiction: (final) appellate to replace the Judicial Committee of the Privy Council (for Belize), and original to adjudicate Revised Treaty of Chaguaramas matters (RTC; for Belize and Trinidad and Tobago). Since its 2005 founding, the Court "has incrementally established doctrines of [Caribbean] Community law that both resemble and deviate from those enunciated" by other international courts, such as the European Court of Justice vis-a-vis European Union law. In Myrie v Barbados, (Note: [2013] CCJ 3 (OJ).) the Court held that Caribbean Community (CARICOM; the Community) nationals had freedom of movement throughout member states, and could directly apply to the Court (without first exhausting local remedies) for enforcement of Community rights. The decision attracted queer (LGBTQ) activists "to test how far the CCJ would go in that subject area [enforcing the Community rights of queer nationals]".

Maurice Tomlinson, a University of the West Indies attorney-at-law and Jamaican queer rights activist, applied to the Court for special leave to commence proceedings against Belize and Trinidad and Tobago on 31 May 2013, seeking to strike down provisions in their Immigration Acts which prohibited homosexuals from entering said countries, arguing these violated his Myrie-established Community right to free movement. The Court consolidated the claims on 17 July 2013, and granted leave on 8 May 2014. The Caribbean Forum for Liberation and Acceptance of Genders and Sexualities (CariFLAGS; (Note: Also CARIFLAGS.) a Jamaican queer charity) and CARICOM were granted leave to file submissions in 2014. Oral arguments were heard on 17–18 March 2015.

== Facts ==
Tomlinson regularly travelled throughout the Caribbean for LGBTQ rights activism, including to Belize on two occasions, and Trinidad and Tobago on four. On those occasions he experienced no difficulties entering said countries, and was not asked about his sexual orientation by immigration officers, but nor did he disclose it (form of passing). As such, his complaint was not centred on any refusal of entry nor wrongful treatment by the defendants, but rather on the allegation that the explicit text of their Immigration Acts sufficed to prejudice the enjoyment of his Community rights.

Neither Belize nor Trinidad and Tobago challenged Tomlinson's Community right to free movement, and both agreed that homosexuals could not be denied admission as "undesirable persons" per the 2007 Decision of the Conference of Heads of Government of CARICOM (Note: Also Decision of the Conference of Heads of Government of the Caribbean Community taken at their Twenty-Eighth Meeting.) (the 2007 Conference Decision), and further asserted that in practice they had never prohibited CARICOM nationals from entering their jurisdictions on the basis of sexual orientation. Belize further argued that they interpreted their Act as prohibiting only those profiting from sexual behaviour, whereas Trinidad and Tobago admitted they did read their Act as barring entry to homosexuals (and others), but noted they did not enforce this provision.

The claimant argued he nonetheless faced "genuine legal uncertainty" as to what would happen if he attempted to enter either country, given the current text of the relevant Acts.

CariFLAGS supported the claimaint, whilst CARICOM filed on behalf of the defendants.

== Judgment ==
On 10 June 2016, the Court ruled against Tomlinson, finding that his claims against Belize and Trinidad and Tobago failed, in light of which "the requested remedies must be refused". The Court held "that Tomlinson has no valid reason to assume that his rights will not be respected by the States", and proferred two reasons for this conclusion. Firstly, they found that the defendants' state practice in relation to the relevant sections (Note: For Belize: section 5(1)(e), prohibiting the entry of "any prostitute or homosexual or any person who may be living on or receiving or may have been living on or receiving the proceeds of prostitution or homosexual behaviour". For Trinidad and Tobago: section 8(1)(e), prohibiting the entry of "prostitutes, homosexuals or persons living on the earnings of prostitutes or homosexuals, or persons reasonably suspected as coming to Trinidad and Tobago for these or any other immoral purposes".) of their Immigrations Acts "does not suggest any incompatibility with the RTC (Note: Namely Articles 7, 45, and 46, which prohibit discrimination on the grounds of nationality, require member states to commit to free movement within CARICOM, and require member states to allow entry to and employment of skilled CARICOM nationals, respectively.) or the 2007 Conference Decision (Note: Providing "that all CARICOM nationals should be entitled to an automatic stay of six months upon arrival in order to enhance their sense that they belong to, and can move in the Caribbean Community, subject to the rights of Member States to refuse undesirable persons entry and to prevent persons from becoming a charge on public funds".)". Secondly, they found that "the practice or policy of admitting homosexual nationals from other CARICOM States (not falling under the two exceptions (Note: CARICOM Member States reserved the right "to refuse undesirable persons entry and to prevent persons from becoming a charge on public funds".) mentioned in the 2007 Conference Decision) is not a matter of discretion but is legally required (Note: Emphasis in original.) based on Article 9 (Note: "Member States shall take all appropriate measures, whether general or particular, to ensure the carrying out of obligations arising out of this Treaty".) of the RTC as this is an appropriate measure within the meaning of that provision". In supplement to these reasons, the Court noted that, as the RTC had been incorporated into the domestic law of CARICOM member states, the aforementioned legal requirement "equally exists within the domestic legal order of a Member State, notwithstanding a real or apparent contradictory provision in the national Immigration Act".

The Court thus dismissed Tomlinson's claims, and ordered parties to bear their own costs.

== Reactions ==
Tomlinson deemed the case "a significant win", as now "member states were clearly prohibited from practising laws that conflict with the fundamental freedoms of CARICOM such as discrimination based on sexual orientation". The Court "took pains to emphasise" that it was not "condoning the indefinite retention on the statute book of a national law which in appearance seems to conflict with obligations under Community law".

The Court's decision has been described as "cautious" and an instance of "reluctance", "legal diplomacy", and "judicial restraint" for focussing on the application of law rather than statutory language. This "restricted focus on actual practices as opposed to the existence of discriminatory laws" has been criticised as "questionable" and "regrettable", given it seemingly contradicted existing jurisprudence of international human rights bodies (like the UN Human Rights Council in Toonen v Australia), and did little to impart the clarity and certainty required for rule of law. The strategy has nonetheless been deemed deliberate and necessary, given "deep cleavages in Caribbean society with regard to [queer] rights and [the Court's] limited competence in the OJ [original jurisdiction]". The Court's unusual delay (their lengthiest to 2018) was also noted, as was their novel blending of original and appellate jurisdiction in interpreting Belize's Act.

== Legacy ==
The case endorsed non-discrimination on the basis of sexual orientation, recognised free movement within CARICOM, and clarified the direct applicability of Community law in the legal systems of member states. It (along with Myrie) "cemented the autonomy and direct availability of supranational law in the Caribbean". It was followed by McEwan & Ors v AG of Guyana, (Note: [2018] CCJ 30 (AJ).) where the Court struck down anti-vagrancy laws which criminalised cross-dressing in Guyana, despite a constitutional savings clause. These cases (along with Nervais & Severin v the Queen (Note: [2018] CCJ 19 (AJ), where the Court struck down Barbados's mandatory death penalty, despite a constitutional savings clause.)) "clearly improved human rights standards in the region". They further "clearly influenced" the 2018 decriminalisation of homosexuality in Trinidad and Tobago via judicial review, and a similar ruling by the Inter-American Commission on Human Rights against Jamaica in 2020.

The case received "significant attention" in popular culture and scholarship, due to its relevance to queer rights.

== See also ==
- LGBTQ rights in Belize
- LGBTQ rights in Trinidad and Tobago
- Orozco v AG – 2016 LGBTQ rights case in Belize

== Notes and references ==
=== References ===
1. Tomlinson v Belize & Trinidad and Tobago [2016] CariCJ 12
2. Caserta S, Madsen MR (2016). "Tomlinson v. Belize; Tomlinson v. Trinidad and Tobago". American Journal of International Law. 110 (3): 533–540. doi:10.1017/S0002930000016948.
3. "CCJ dismisses gay rights activist's case". CARICOM Today. 10 June 2016. Archived from the original on 18 June 2016.
4. Scruggs G (29 September 2016). "Aruba, Belize signal potential sea change for gay rights in the Caribbean". NotiCen.
5. Tisdale L (2018). "A Triumphant Victory for Gay Rights in Belize Lays the Foundation for a Domino Effect Throughout the Caribbean". Loyola of Los Angeles International and Comparative Law Review. 41 (1): 99–123.
6. Butler P, Lein E, Salim R, eds. (2018). Integration and International Dispute Resolution in Small States. Cham, Switzerland: Springer. doi:10.1007/978-3-319-74573-2. ISBN 978-3-319-74573-2.
7. Caserta S (2018). "The Contribution of the Caribbean Court of Justice to the Development of Human and Fundamental Rights". Human Rights Law Review. 18 (1): 170–184. doi:10.1093/hrlr/ngx039.
8. Caserta S, Cebulak P (2021). "Resilience Techniques of International Courts in Times of Resistance to International Law". International & Comparative Law Quarterly. 70 (3): 737–768. doi:10.1017/S0020589321000154.
9. Caserta S, Madsen MR (2024). "When the Sun, the Moon and the Stars Align: Litigating LGBTQIA+ Rights and the Death Penalty in East Africa and the Caribbean". European Journal of International Law. 35 (3): 727–750. doi:10.1093/ejil/chae040.
