= LGBTQ rights in Belize =

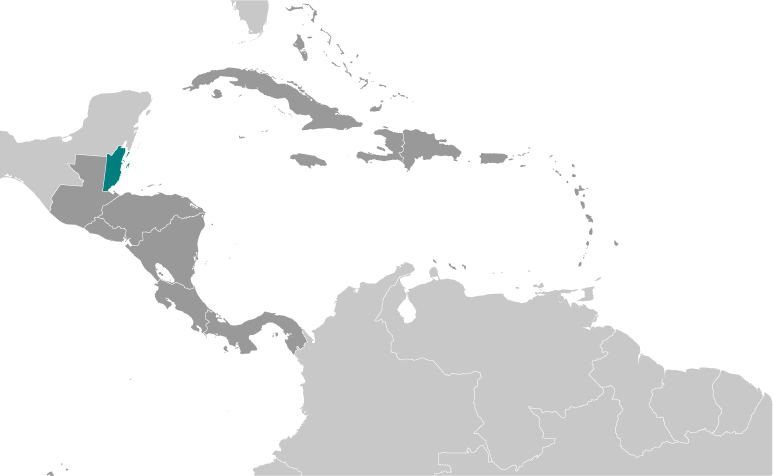
- Belize
- Legal status: Legal since 2016
- Gender identity: No
- Military: Yes
- Discrimination protections: Sexual orientation protections

Family rights
- Recognition of relationships: No recognition of same-sex couples
- Adoption: No

Lesbian, gay, bisexual, and transgender (LGBTQ) persons in Belize face legal challenges not experienced by non-LGBT citizens, although attitudes have been changing in recent years. Same-sex sexual activity was decriminalized in Belize in 2016, when the Supreme Court declared Belize's anti-sodomy law unconstitutional. Belize's constitution prohibits discrimination on the basis of sex, which Belizean courts have interpreted to include sexual orientation.

Belize held its first Pride Week in August 2017. Activities raising awareness and acceptance were hosted throughout the country.

== Legality of same-sex sexual activity ==
According to Section 53 of the Belize Criminal Code, "Every person who has carnal intercourse against the order of nature with any person ... shall be liable to imprisonment for 10 years." It was argued in the challenge to Section 53 of the Criminal Code that homosexuality per se is not illegal, but any sexual act which is not the "sexual congress of a phallus inserted into a vagina" is illegal, including oral sex, anal sex between heterosexual or homosexual persons, masturbation, etc. Section 53 was overturned on 10 August 2016 as a violation of the Constitution of Belize.

While sodomy bans in The Bahamas were removed by the Parliament in 1991 and bans in the British Overseas Territories were overturned in 2000 by a UK Order in Council, Belize's sodomy ban was the first one in a former British colony in the Caribbean to be judicially overturned. It was also the last sodomy ban in Central America to be struck down.

=== Caleb Orozco v. Attorney General of Belize ===
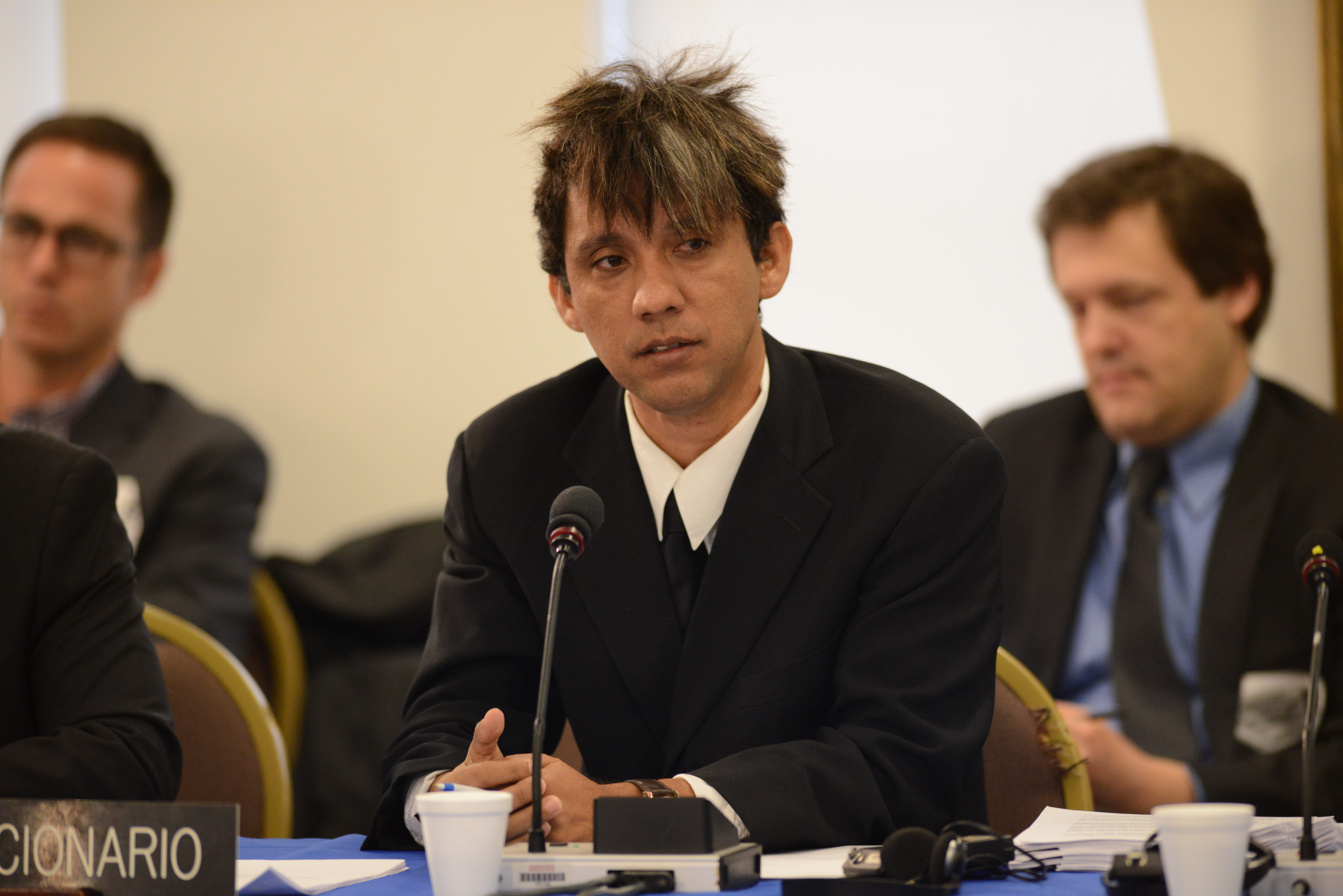
Caleb Orozco successfully argued in court that Belize's sodomy ban was unconstitutional.

In September 2010, the United Belize Advocacy Movement (UNIBAM) and its executive director Caleb Orozco jointly filed a case in the Supreme Court of Judicature of Belize challenging the constitutionality of Belize's anti-sodomy law with the support of the International Commission of Jurists, the Commonwealth Lawyers' Association, and the Human Dignity Trust.

Counsel for the Church Interested Parties (CIP) (consisting of the Roman Catholic Church, the Belize Church of England Corporate Body, and the Evangelical Association of Churches) argued in January 2012 that UNIBAM had no standing to bring the case because, as an organization, it has no constitutionally guaranteed rights. Relying on Section 20 of the Belize Constitution, the court sided with CIP on 27 April 2012 and struck out UNIBAM as a claimant. In December 2012, Justice Arana granted UNIBAM "interested party" status, which was the same status given to CIP.

The case was heard by the Supreme Court of Judicature in May 2013, amid violence and death threats received by LGBT activists. On 10 August 2016, Chief Justice Kenneth Benjamin ruled that Section 53 of the Criminal Code of Belize contravened constitutional protections of equality, dignity and personal privacy. Orozco prevailed on all points in the decision, in which Benjamin reiterated that the court was required to make a legal ruling rather than a moral judgment. Benjamin ordered that the Criminal Code be amended with the insertion of the phrase "This section shall not apply to consensual sexual acts between adults." He went on to state that the Belizean Constitution must be consistent with international interpretations and clarified that "sex" as mentioned in Section 16(3) of the Constitution, includes sexual orientation.

Homosexuality laws in Central America and the Caribbean Islands. Same-sex marriage Other type of partnership Unregistered cohabitation No recognition of same-sex couples Constitution limits marriage to opposite-sex couples Same-sex sexual activity illegal but law not enforced

On 17 August 2016, the Government announced they would not appeal the ruling to the Caribbean Court of Justice, but that other interested parties may appeal. After meeting with religious leaders on September 9, the Government reversed course and announced they would make a partial appeal of the ruling, specifically appealing the declaration that the Constitution prohibits discrimination based on sexual orientation. Interested parties filed to appeal the ruling on September 16. On 4 October 2016, the National Evangelical Association of Belize's appeal of the case was rejected by the Chief Justice because the organization was not an original interested party to the case. In March 2018, the Catholic Church in Belize officially withdrew from the appeal, leaving the Government of Belize as the sole appellant to the decision on Section 53. With the Catholic Church withdrawal, recognition was given that sexual relations between consenting adults was fully legalized in Belize, as the partial appeal by the Government concerned only whether the anti-discrimination clause of the Constitution which referred to sex could be interpreted to prohibit discrimination on the basis of sexual orientation.

On 29 October 2018, the appellate court heard full arguments from both sides. The position of Orozco's legal team was that the appeal should be dismissed, as by the state having no objection to declaring section 53 of the Criminal Code unconstitutional, the partial appeal on discrimination could have no effect. Westmin James called the appeal "academic" because the Constitution protects the LGBT community from discrimination, meaning that even if that portion of the ruling was overturned the Government could not discriminate against a specific segment of the population. Nigel Hawke, the Solicitor General of Belize, argued that the ruling was a judicial overreach to re-define the constitutional protections afforded to non-discrimination on the basis of "sex" to extend to "sexual orientation". Lisa Shoman, countered the argument, stating: "The judges are the guardians of what the constitution means, it's their job to interpret the constitution". Citing that international treaty obligations Belize had entered into are typically used to inform interpretation of domestic law, she refuted the claim of overreach. Judgment on the appeal was reserved pending further deliberation.

On 30 December 2019, the Appeals Court upheld the unconstitutionality of Section 53 and the expansion of protections in the Constitution against discrimination to include sexual orientation and freedom of expression to include sexual expression.

=== Church opposition to decriminalisation ===
In response to the case filed by UNIBAM and Caleb Orozco, Catholic and the Protestant churches reacted negatively, saying that same-sex marriage would be next. On 3 December 2011, the Council of Churches organized a "Take a Stand" rally to oppose the UNIBAM case.

The Belizean Council of Churches held a "Belize Action/Family Forum" rally on 23 November 2011 to express its opposition to decriminalization as part of "an orchestrated plan of demonic darkness to dethrone God from our Constitution and open massive gateways to demonic influence and destruction that will affect generation after generation to come."

=== Pressure from the United States ===
In December 2011, United States President Barack Obama criticised nations that persecute homosexuals. In response, Belizean Prime Minister Dean Barrow reiterated that Belize would not change its laws. He argued that the issue is one for Belize to deal with and if the U.S. wanted to punish states by removing foreign aid for continuing such practice, then "they will have to cut off their aid".

== Immigration ban ==
Under Section 5(1) of the Immigration Act, "the following persons are prohibited immigrants – ... (e) any prostitute or homosexual or any person who may be living on or receiving or may have been living on or receiving the proceeds of prostitution or homosexual behaviour".

A challenge by Jamaican activist Maurice Tomlinson was filed in 2013 to the immigration ban in both Trinidad and Tobago and Belize. Tomlinson asked Jamaica, his home country, to insist that the travel bans of these countries be removed based on CARICOM provisions for free movement of citizens of member countries. Jamaica refused, and Tomlinson petitioned the Caribbean Court of Justice asking leave to file the case with them directly. In May 2014, Tomlinson was granted leave to challenge the immigration laws of both countries. In October 2014, CARICOM joined the case as an interested party supporting Tomlinson's arguments. On 18 March 2015, the challenge was heard with allegations that the immigration bans abridge the rights of free movement for Caribbean citizens contained in the Treaty of Chaguaramas. On 10 June 2016, the CCJ ruled that neither Trinidad and Tobago nor Belize had violated Tomlinson's freedom of movement, dismissing his case. As clarification, the judgment noted that neither state can ban homosexuals from CARICOM countries from entering their countries due to their treaty obligations, "notwithstanding their laws that ban the entry of gays". During the trial, Belize contended that Section 5(1) of the Immigration Act applied only to those offering sexual services for financial gain, and that it does not interpret or enforce the act as a blanket prohibition against homosexual immigrants.

== Discrimination protections ==
On 10 August 2016, the Supreme Court ruled that Section 53 of the Belizean Criminal Code is unconstitutional (see above). Chief Justice Kenneth Benjamin also clarified that "sex" as mentioned in Section 16(3) of the Constitution, includes sexual orientation. Therefore, the Constitution of Belize prohibits discrimination on the basis of sexual orientation.

In 1996, Minister of Foreign Affairs Dean Barrow, (who would later become Prime Minister), signed a UN multi-lateral treaty known as the International Covenant on Civil and Political Rights (ICCPR). In 1993, the language of the treaty was interpreted by the UN Commission on Human Rights to include sexual preference in the prohibition of discrimination on the basis of sex. According to Chief Justice Benjamin, by signing the treaty, Belize tacitly agreed to this interpretation, and the Constitution of Belize must be interpreted in the same light.

In 2018, during a Universal Periodic Review (UPR), Belize accepted 15 LGBT-related recommendations, from addressing discrimination, violence and hate crimes against LGBT people to ensuring that LGBT people have access to proper HIV treatment. The recommendations, mostly from developed nations (namely Argentina, Australia, Brazil, Chile, France, Germany, Iceland, Ireland, Italy, Mexico, Spain, Ukraine, the United States, and Uruguay) called for legislative measures to prohibit discrimination in employment, housing and government services against LGBT people, reducing societal stigma through educational campaigns, training police officials to properly respond to violence, and taking concrete steps to ensure universal access to HIV treatment.

=== Sexual harassment ===
The Anti-Sexual Harassment Act 2024, expressly provides provisions for the prevention and protection of persons from sexual harassment regardless of sexual preference and gender identity.

=== Hate crimes law ===
Section 8(1)(c)(i) of the Alternative Sentencing Act 2024 states that the "evidence that the offence was motivated by bias, prejudice or hate based on sexual orientation" is considered to be an aggravating circumstance. The law came into effect on April 27, 2024.

== Public opinion ==
In 2013, UNAIDS conducted a survey of 773 Belizeans, ages 18 to 64. The survey found that 34% consider themselves accepting of homosexuals, while another 34% consider themselves tolerant of homosexuals. Of all the Caribbean countries that were polled, Belize and Suriname had the highest percentage of acceptance for homosexuals.

== Living conditions ==
Since the August 2016 Supreme Court ruling, LGBT organisations have become more visible and active. Young LGBT Belizeans have also been inspired to come out.

=== Tourism ===
Belize has long been a popular tourist destination for LGBT people. Many holiday resorts host LGBT events. San Pedro Town is considered to be the most gay-friendly destination for tourists in Belize. It has a thriving gay nightlife during the high season. Many businesses are openly owned and run by LGBT people in the town.

In 2009, Kim Simplis Barrow, the wife of Prime Minister Dean Barrow, personally welcomed the arrival of a lesbian cruise ship, whose passengers then volunteered at a local children's hospital.

== Summary table ==
Same-sex sexual activity legal	Yes (Since 2016)
Equal age of consent (16)	Yes (Since 2016)
Anti-discrimination laws in employment	Yes (Since 2016)
Anti-discrimination laws in the provision of goods and services	Yes (Since 2016)
Anti-discrimination laws in all other areas (incl. indirect discrimination, hate speech)	Yes (Since 2016)
Hate crimes law including sexual orientation	Yes (Since 2024)
Same-sex marriages	No
Recognition of same-sex couples	No
Stepchild adoption by same-sex couples	No
Joint adoption by same-sex couples	No
LGBT people allowed to serve openly in the military	Yes (Since 2016)
Right to change legal gender	No
Access to IVF for lesbians	No
Commercial surrogacy for gay male couples	No
MSMs allowed to donate blood	No

== See also ==
- List of LGBTQ rights organisations in Belize
- LGBTQ rights in the Caribbean
- LGBTQ rights in the Commonwealth of Nations
- Caleb Orozco – local LGBTQ rights activist
- Derricia Castillo-Salazar – local LGBTQ rights activist
- Violence against LGBTQ people in Belize
- Timeline of LGBTQ history in Belize
