= Derricia Castillo-Salazar =

Belizean military officer

- Born: 1988 (age 36–37)
- Allegiance: Belize
- Branch: Belize Defence Force
- Rank: Captain

Derricia Castillo-Salazar (born 1988), also known as Derricia Jael Castillo, is a Belizean military officer, aircraft maintenance officer of the Belize Defence Force (BDF) and LGBT activist. She is the co-founder and president of Our Circle (Belize), an organization dedicated to the inclusion of the LGBT community.

== Biography ==
After a year-long training to learn how a rotorcraft operates, she is among 13 trained technicians in charge of keeping in deployment conditions three helicopters of the Belize Defence Force, as well as the first helicopter maintenance personnel of the BDF after the British Arm Training and Support Unit Belize scaled down their operations in 2011. Since Castillo co-founded the voluntary organization Our Circle in 2014, it has engaged approximately 200 members of the LGBT community, as well as provided safe spaces to educate, empower and build the community in Belize. She has assisted in the creation and implementation a Belize Defence Force HIV Response, spoken at the 38th meeting of UNAIDS in Geneva, worked as a conflict mediator, and is a member of the Caribbean Women's Alliance for Diversity and Equality.

In 2016 she was awarded the minister's award by Education and Youth Minister Patrick Faber as part of Youth Month. After Castillo attributed the award to her LGBT work, minister Faber claimed that that was not the reason she was given the award, making it clear that "her sexual orientation or her work were not the problem" but that "he was upset about the misrepresentation of the award". Faber also declared that he was considering revoking it. The minister claimed afterwards he will not be taking the award away, posted an apology to Castillo and mentioned that while Castillo's work for the LGBT community was not considered when giving her the award, it should have been.

On March 29, 2017, chargé d'affaires Adrienne Galanek of the United States embassy awarded Derricia Castillo as the U.S. Department of State’s International Women of Courage Award nominee for Belize for her work for inclusion of the LGBT community in Belize and AIDS prevention, policy, and response within the Belize Defence Force during the 12th Annual Outstanding Women’s Awards Ceremony, along with Jane Ellen Mary Usher, recognized as the Embassy’s Woman of the Year 2017.

== See also ==
- LGBTQ rights in Belize
- Violence against LGBTQ people in Belize
