= West Indian Reports =

Caribbean law reports

- Editor: Editors as of 2022: Yonette Cummings-Edwards (Note: For Guyana.); Michael Barnett (Note: For The Bahamas.); Patrick Brooks (Note: For Jamaica.); Mabel Abyemang (Note: For Turks and Caicos.); Patterson Cheltenham (Note: For Barbados.); Narinder Hargun (Note: For Bermuda.); Michelle Arana (Note: For Belize.); Janice Pereira (Note: For Eastern Caribbean States.); Adrian Saunders (Note: For the Caribbean Court of Justice.); Ivor Archie (Note: For Trinidad and Tobago.)
- Categories: Law reports
- Frequency: Every six months
- First issue: 1959; 67 years ago
- Company: Butterworths (Note: Original publisher.); LexisNexis (Note: Current publisher, as of 2022.)
- Country: United Kingdom
- Based in: London
- Language: English
- Website: lexisweb.co.uk
- OCLC: 01769628

The West Indian Reports, abbreviated WIR, are a series of law reports of court cases decided in the high, superior and appellate courts of Commonwealth Caribbean (West Indian) states and territories, and of appeals therefrom to either of the region's two final appellate courts, namely the Judicial Committee of the Privy Council in London, or the Caribbean Court of Justice in Port of Spain, Trinidad. The WIR include judgments from The Bahamas, Barbados, Belize, Bermuda, the Cayman Islands, Eastern Caribbean States, Guyana, Jamaica, Trinidad and Tobago, and Turks and Caicos. They were first published in 1959 and, as of 2022, are currently published by LexisNexis in two volumes each year, in both digital and hard copy formats. Along with the traditional Law Reports, the WIR are the preferred reports for case citations in the Caribbean Court of Justice.

== History ==
The CCJ, final appellate court of Guyana (Georgetown courthouse shown) and other CARICOM states, require citations to the WIR when available

The WIR were first published in 1959 by Butterworths of London. Their first volume covered cases from 1958. Early volumes were published annually, were edited by the chief justices and "some other judges" of Barbados, Guyana, Jamaica, Trinidad and Tobago, and the West Indies Associated States, and reported judicial decisions only from said jurisdictions. By 1988, the series were deemed essential stock for court libraries by a majority of "legal officers, the judiciary and private practitioners of the Commonwealth Caribbean". As late as September 2004, the series were still deemed "the only reporter published on a regular basis" for the region, for instance, by American Association of Law Libraries librarian Jean M. Wenger (quoted here). On 14 March 2007, the Caribbean Court of Justice directed that reference to the WIR "should always" be given when cases cited in proceedings are reported in said series. By December 2018, the WIR had been digitised and disseminated online, thereby improving access to and discoverability of West Indian case law, as a result of which "Caribbean legal literature has evolved rapidly in the last decade", according to Osgoode Hall Law School librarian Yemisi Dina.

== Reception ==
The WIR were initially criticised for their editorial policy (on which cases are reported; deemed unusually restrictive, selective and inconstruable) and their time to publication (from when cases are decided; deemed prolonged), which critics said resulted in "inadequate" and "defective" reporting. For instance, in April 1977, attendees of a workshop regarding legal education in the Caribbean noted "the [continuing] need for an improved system of reporting [of] the decisions of the courts of the Commonwealth Caribbean". Similarly, in a July 1985 address to the Caribbean Association of Law Libraries, Hugh Wooding Law School tutor Claude Denbow pointed out that the WIR were still not sufficiently referenced in proceedings before West Indian courts, especially by barristers trained in England, leading to judgments discordant with "local conditions". Denbow attributed this state of affairs to, among other factors, the delayed publication of judgments in the WIR, and the confusing criteria employed by their editors when deciding whether to include or exclude the same.

== Citation ==
Case citations to the WIR are one of two standard references for proceedings before the Caribbean Court of Justice. Cases reported in the WIR are cited as in the accompanying table. For instance, the first record of said table indicates that the decision of the Supreme Court of Judicature of Trinidad and Tobago, titled Archbald v Camacho, was decided in 1960 and may be found in volume 3 of the West Indian Reports, starting on page 40.

Format of case citations to the WIR.
Style of cause	(year of decision)	[year of report]	volume	report	(series)	page
Archbald v Camacho	(1960)		3	WIR		40
Jorsingh v Attorney General	(1997)		52	WIR		501
Ali v David	(2020)		99	WIR		363

== See also ==
- Law Reports of the Commonwealth – similar law reports

== Notes and references ==
=== References ===
1. "Jogie v Sealey" (Appeal No. 0090 of 2017). London: Privy Council. 15 August 2022.
2. "Lumba v Secretary of State for the Home Department". London: Supreme Court. 23 March 2011.
3. "Sersland & Paz v St Matthews University School of Medicine Ltd". Port of Spain, Trinidad: Caribbean Court of Justice. 24 November 2022.
4. Bastide, M. A. de la (14 March 2007). "Practice Direction (Caribbean Court of Justice: Citation of Judgments and Reported Cases)". West Indian Reports. pp. 399–401.
5. Davies, Lisa; Tyson, Alice (February 2022). "Commonwealth countries: Commonwealth". IALS Library (Library guide). London: School of Advanced Study of the University of London.
6. Denbow, Claude (July–November 1986). "West Indian Legal Material – Availability – Problems of the Researchers". Caribbean Law Librarian. Vol. 3, no. 2–3. Kingston, Jamaica: Caribbean Association of Law Libraries. pp. 33–36. hdl:2027/txu.059172018130807.
7. Dina, Yemisi (November–December 2018) [First published May 2006]. "Guide to Caribbean Law Research". GlobaLex. Updated version. New York, NY: New York University.
8. Newton, Velma (March 1979). "An Historical Perspective of Law Reporting in the English-Speaking Caribbean: A Case for Regional Law Reporting". International Journal of Law Libraries. 7 (1): 1–22. ISSN 0340-045X.
9. Newton, Velma (September 1988). "Standards for Court Libraries". Caribbean Journal of Legal Information. 5 (2): 6–13. ISSN 0255-7118.
10. Patchett, K. W. (July 1963). "English Law in the West Indies: A Conference Report". International and Comparative Law Quarterly. 12 (3): 922–966. JSTOR 756296.
11. Mudge, Arthur W.; Archibald, Joseph; Pollard, Duke E. E. (July 1989). Caribbean Improvement of Justice Project (Eastern Caribbean and Belize): Midterm Evaluation (Report). Washington, DC: TvT Associates for USAID. Archived from the original on 28 November 2022.
12. Wenger, Jean M. (September 2004). "Caribbean Law Librarian Par Excellence Addresses Members in Boston". FCIL Newsletter. Vol. 19, no. 1. Chicago, IL: American Association of Law Libraries. pp. 14–15.
