= Jonathan Cooper (barrister) =

British barrister and human rights activist (1962–2021)

Jonathan Paul Cooper OBE (22 September 1962 – 18 September 2021) was a British barrister and human rights activist, described by The Guardian journalist Owen Boycott as "at the forefront of efforts to decriminalise homosexuality around the world". He practised at Doughty Street Chambers and edited the European Human Rights Law Review. In 2011, he co-founded the Human Dignity Trust, a UK-based charity that focuses on strategic litigation against the criminalization of homosexuality worldwide, and served as its director until 2016.

Cooper was openly gay and married to art historian Kevin Childs; they had been together since 1992.

== Life and career ==
Cooper was born on 22 September 1962 in Salford. His father, Peter, was a lecturer at Manchester University in psychology, while his mother, Jackie, worked in market research. Cooper attended Dartington Hall School then studied psychology at Goldsmiths College, but left without a degree. He later studied history at Kent University. He studied law with the intention of helping underprivileged people and was called to the bar in 1992.

He worked as Liberty's legal director and later for Justice from 1997 until 2003 when he resigned in order to practise law. At the time of his death, he was a board member of the Granta Trust. He was made an OBE in 2007 "for services to human rights". The cases he worked on included LGBT people and military service, the treatment of asylum seekers in Greece, and Belarusian pro-democracy activists. In 2018, he campaigned against Brexit by declaring Totnes an independent city-state and distributing mock passports.

Cooper died four days before his 59th birthday while walking with his husband in the Scottish Highlands on 18 September 2021. Shortly before his death, Cooper was working with Helena Kennedy on a proposal to ban conversion therapy.

He received tributes from Kennedy, Geoffrey Robertson, Peter Tatchell, Jayne Ozanne, Nancy Kelley, Michael Cashman, and Philippe Sands.

The European Human Rights Law Review published a special issue dedicated to his life's work in February 2022. Around the same time, the University of Oxford’s History Faculty established a new professorship of the History of Sexualities named after Jonathan Cooper, in association with Mansfield College. The Jonathan Cooper Chair of the History of Sexualities is the first fully endowed specialist post focusing on LGBT history in the UK. It was made possible by a £4.9 million gift from Professor Peter Baldwin and Dr Lisbet Rausing, historians and Co-Founders of the Arcadia Fund. In December 2022, the University of Oxford's Faculty of Law, on initiative of Richard Wagenlander, launched the "Jonathan Cooper LGBTQ+ Mooting Competition", the university's first dedication mooting competition dedicated to promoting the intellectual study of legal issues related to sexual orientation and gender identities.

== Works ==
- Colvin, Madeleine; Cooper, Jonathan (2009). Human Rights in the Investigation and Prosecution of Crime. OUP Oxford. ISBN 978-0-19-921441-9.
