= Caleb Orozco =

Belizean LGBT rights activist (born 1973)

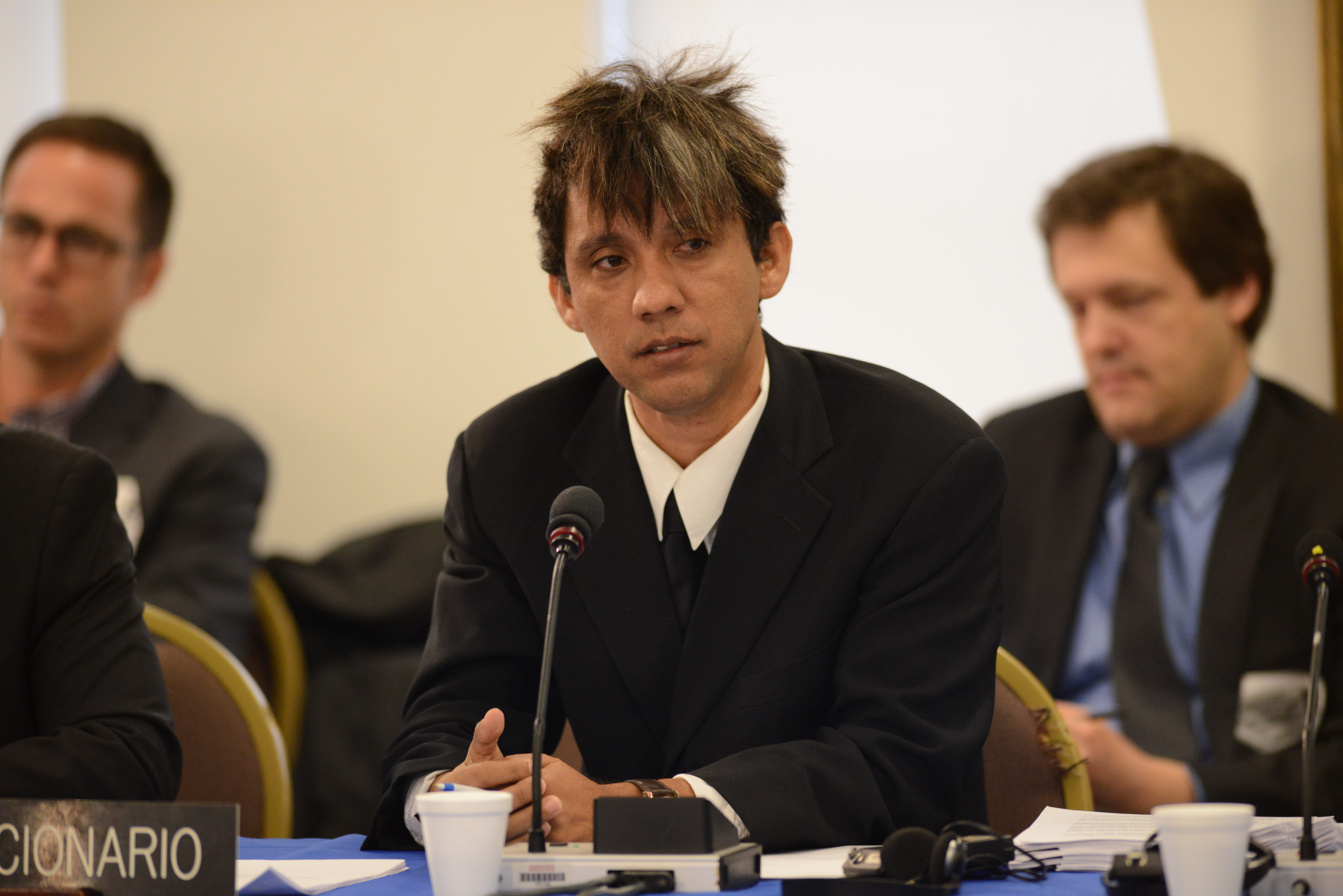
- Caleb Orozco in March 2014
- Born: 5 December 1973 (age 52)
- Education: St. John's College
- Alma mater: University of Belize (BA)
- Occupation: LGBT rights activist
- Years active: 2006–present

Caleb Orozco (born 1973) is an LGBT activist in Belize. He was the chief litigant in a case successfully challenging the anti-sodomy laws of Belize and the co-founder of the only LGBT advocacy group in the country.

== Biography ==
Orozco became politically active when he was 31, after attending a workshop in Belize City for gay men and for people living with HIV. Orozco co-founded the United Belize Advocacy Movement (UNIBAM) in 2006, and later became the president. UNIBAM is the country's only LGBT advocacy group and has been using the legal system to challenge the anti-sodomy laws in Belize. UNIBAM is run out of Orzoco's home.

In 2009, Orozco attended an HIV conference in Jamaica where he met two law professors from the University of the West Indies Rights Advocacy Project. The two professors identified Belize as an ideal case for challenging bans on same-sex relationships.

In Belize, there was a law that specified a 10-year prison sentence for sodomy. In 2011, Orozco and UNIBAM filed a constitutional case against the law, and challenged section 53 of the criminal code in Belize. The Catholic Church in Belize came out against the filing, which Orozco defended, saying, "The case is personal and it's about reminding the system that my human rights isn't about picking and choosing which you'll support and which you will ignore. My human rights is total. It's not to be mandated by the church because the church does not govern this country. Period." Not long after the filing, the church made a successful pretrial motion to remove UNIBAM saying the group had no legal standing, leaving Orozco the sole claimant on the case. Gay people in Belize did not have a legal voice until Orozco filed the case.

After filing the challenge, Orozco said there had been an increase in hatred directed at LGBT people in Belize. In February 2012, he was threatened with anti-gay insults and hit in the face with a bottle which required surgery. He also began to get death threats because of his challenge to the anti-sodomy law. Orozco has also had his car damaged by people threatening him.

Orozco continued to participate in conferences. He was part of a forum called "Realising the Dream of Caribbean LGBT Inclusion", given at Ryerson University during the 2014 WorldPride Human Rights conference in Toronto.

In May 2013, arguments were made in court about the case. On August 10, 2016, the chief justice ruled Section 53 of the criminal code to be unconstitutional. The law was said "to violate Orozco's human dignity, privacy, and (in forcing him to lie or risk prosecution) freedom of expression." Orozco said, "This is the first day of my life in which it is legal for me to be me." UNIBAM and Orozco began discussions with Patrick Faber, the Deputy Prime Minister about LGBT representation on the Morality Commission in Belize.

In December 2016, he was awarded the David Kato Vision and Voice award.

== See also ==
- LGBT rights in Belize
- Violence against LGBTQ people in Belize
