= List of LGBTQ rights organisations in Belize =

This is a list of LGBTQ rights organisations in Belize. It further includes non-advocacy groups focussing on the queer community (LGBTQ-related organisations), such as those providing support services. As of November 2022, there were seven such groups, mostly dating to the 2010s, and mostly based in central Belize. The first such was UNIBAM, an advocacy group founded in February 2006.

== Table ==
Tabular list of LGBTQ-related and LGBTQ-rights organisations in Belize.
Organisation	Year founded	District	Focus	Status
United Belize Advocacy Movement	2006	Belize	—N/a	Active
Promoting Empowerment Through Awareness of Lesbian and Bisexual Women	2011	Belize	Women	Active
Belize Youth Empowerment for Change	2013	Cayo	Youth	Active
Our Circle	2013	Belize	Families	Active
Trans in Action Belize	2014	—N/a	Transgender individuals	Active
Empower Yourself Belize Movement	2015	Belize	Youth, HIV/AIDS patients	Active
Belize Trans Colours	2018	Belize	Transgender individuals	Active

== United Belize Advocacy Movement ==
United Belize Advocacy Movement
- Abbreviation: UNIBAM; UniBAM; Unibam
- Predecessor: UNIDAD 96
- Formation: 16 February 2006; 20 years ago
- Founders: Caleb Orozco and "10 others"
- Founded at: Channel 5 Building; 2882 Coney Drive; Belize City
- Type: NGO
- Headquarters: 5 Ziricote Street; Belize City
- Coordinates: 17.49700°N 88.19941°W
- Region served: Belize
- President: Caleb Orozco
- Expenses: BZ $68,000 (2007)
- Staff: 1 full-time, 2 part-time (2007)
- Website: unibam.org

The United Belize Advocacy Movement, more commonly known as UNIBAM, (Note: Plus: UniBAM, Unibam. Formerly: UNIDAD 96, Unidad 96.) are a Belize-based non-governmental organisation that advocate against the discrimination and stigmatisation of the queer community in Belize.

=== History ===
UNIBAM trace their origins to a 2005 multi-centre study of men who have sex with men, led by Paul Edwards of the Ministry of Health, and Chad Martin of the US Centers for Disease Control and Prevention. The study prompted discussions, primarily in Orange Walk, Orange Walk, which lead to the founding of UNIBAM's predecessor organisation, UNIDAD 96, by Alex Avalos, Fernando Novelo, Caleb Orozco, William Smith, and Jerry Mendoza, "along with many other nameless colleagues". On 16 February 2006, in space provided by Arnulfo Kantun of the National Development Foundation in Belize City, UNIBAM was established by Caleb Orozco and "10 other persons from Belize City and Orange Walk". UNIBAM were registered as an NGO on 4 May 2006, and secured their first grant in October of that year from the Tides Foundation.

Notably, UNIBAM successfully challenged the long-standing (since 1888) statutory criminalisation of homosexuality in Belize in the 2010–2016 Orozco v Attorney General case.

=== Activities ===
UNIBAM aim "to reduce stigma and discrimination" against queer Belizeans. Their primary activities involve research and advocacy, including formal representation of the queer community before national and international bodies, and informal representation in mass media. As of 2008, the primary bodies liaised with included the UN Human Rights Council; the UN Human Rights Committee; the Organisation of American States; the Caribbean Forum for Lesbians, All-Sexuals and Gays (C-FLAG); the Alliance Against AIDS (in Belize); and the Belize Family Life Association (BFLA).

== Promoting Empowerment Through Awareness of Lesbian and Bisexual Women ==
Promoting Empowerment Through Awareness of Lesbian and Bisexual Women
- Abbreviation: PETAL
- Formation: 2011
- Founder: Simone Hill
- Type: NGO
- Headquarters: 37 Zericote Street; Belize City
- Coordinates: 17.50001°N 88.19955°W
- Region served: Belize
- President: Charrice Talbert
- Vice President: Marla Simone Hill
- Secretary: Gerrydean Stewart
- Treasurer: Faith Cunningham
- Board of directors: 7 members
- Website: www.petalbelize.org

Promoting Empowerment Through Awareness of Lesbian and Bisexual Women, more commonly known as PETAL, are a Belize-based non-governmental organisation that advocate for and provide support services to queer women in Belize.

=== History ===
PETAL were established in 2011 by Marla Simone Hill, then vice president of UNIBAM, who had observed "that very little advocacy was being done for the women in the LGBT community". The following year, the organisation engaged the support of social activist Abigail McKay, and inaugurated Conversations, their hallmark programme, deemed "a critical component of PETAL's work". In 2015, they secured a six-month grant from UNIBAM, and registered as a not-for-profit NGO on 29 December 2015, with a pro tempore board consisting of Simone Hill, Ifáṣínà Efunyemi, Charrice Talbert, and Abigail McKay. Their inaugural general meeting was held in December 2018, by which time they counted an active membership of "over 60 women".

=== Activities ===
PETAL aim "to achieve social, economic and gender justice for all women in Belize ... through advocacy and empowerment", with especial focus on lesbian and bisexual women. Their "signature" programme is Conversations, "a safe and brave space in which women sit together in a circle to learn, share, listen and support each other", held since 2012. Other notable programmes include an annual conference during International Women's Day, a Valentine's Day gala, family programming during Mother's Day, monthly gender-based violence outreach, and various sensitisation and awareness workshops. By 2019, PETAL had an active membership of 75 women across the country, and were serving "more than 100 women and girls".

== Belize Youth Empowerment for Change ==
Belize Youth Empowerment for Change
- Abbreviation: BYEC
- Formation: 2013
- Founders: Kevin Mendez, George Andrew Arthurs
- Type: NGO
- Region served: Belize
- Director: Stephen Daniel Diaz
- Coordinator: Kevin Mendez

The Belize Youth Empowerment for Change, also known as BYEC, are a Belize-based non-governmental organisation that advocate for queer individuals, particularly young ones, in Belize.

=== History ===
BYEC were registered as an NGO in 2013, by fellows and alumni of the Youth Leadership in Sexual and Reproductive Health and the Environment Programme of GOBelize (a GOJoven International subsidiary). They spearheaded the annual celebration of queer pride in Belmopan, Cayo in 2015.

=== Activities ===
BYEC are a youth-led organisation which aim "to represent the voices and dreams of young Belizeans with a focus on LGBT youth and [their] empowerment". They have, in concert with other queer advocacy groups in the country, sought "to remove the stigma around Belize's LGBT community by holding open forums and debates". By 2017, their coalition had provided HIV/AIDS testing to 19,000 men, and held six workshops with "100 government officials [and] 25 members of BYEC" regarding queer and human rights, reproductive health, and human sexuality. By the following year, BYEC-led workshops in Belmopan and various villages had engaged over 490 youth.

== Our Circle ==
Our Circle
- Formation: October 2013
- Founders: Derricia Castillo-Salazar and "two other friends"
- Type: NGO
- Headquarters: 14 New Road; Belize City
- Coordinates: 17.49749°N 88.18624°W
- Region served: Belize
- Director: Derricia Castillo-Salazar
- Coordinator: Phyllis Staine
- Counsellor: Erolyn Sebastian
- Board of directors: Abner Recinos, Denae Fairweather, Jeronima Sanchez, Phyllis Staine, Shakeel Flowers, Sherine Petillo
- Expenses: BZ $75,566 (2020)
- Staff: 3
- Website: ourcirclebze.weebly.com

Our Circle are a Belize-based non-governmental organisation that advocate for and provide support services to queer families and individuals in Belize.

=== History ===
Our Circle were established in October 2013 and registered as an NGO in February 2017. They were founded by Derricia Castillo-Salazar "with two other friends [who] felt upset because the LGBTI community was being portrayed [in Belize] as an underground orgy community that engaged in heavy drinking and reckless behaviour" (a queerphobic trope). Their early activities included social events and trips aimed at fostering a sense of community and eroding the aforementioned stereotype.

Notably, Our Circle served as co-chairs of the International Family Equality Day Network (IFED) from 2015 to March 2018, commemorated the first International Family Equality Day in Belize in May 2017, opened a brick-and-mortar community resource centre in August 2017, and successfully advocated for the use of inclusive language in the national census in December 2019. The last milestone, in particular, marked "the first time in Belizean history that LBTQ+ individuals [would] be accounted for officially [in official statistics]".

=== Activities ===
Our Circle aim "to advance legal and lived equality for diverse families, and for those who wish to form them, through building community, changing hearts and minds, and driving policy change". They have provided meeting and informal social space to locals at their offices or Community Centre since the latter's inauguration in August 2017. The centre has been described as "the only established safe space for the LGBT community and their families in the entire country of Belize". By 2017, Our Circle's work had "engaged approximately 200 members of the Belizean LGBT community". By 2020, their centre had provided a safe space or support services to "hundreds of people", while the organisation as a whole had expended more than $980,000 in providing said services, raising awareness, and advocating for the queer people.

== Trans in Action Belize ==
Trans in Action Belize
- Abbreviation: TIA Belize
- Formation: 2014
- Founder: Zahnia Canul, Mia Quetzal
- Type: NGO
- Region served: Belize
- Director: Zahnia Canul

Trans in Action Belize, also known as TIA Belize, are a Belize-based non-governmental organisation that advocate for queer individuals, particularly transgender, transsexual, and transvestite ones, in Belize.

=== History ===
TIA Belize were established and registered as an NGO in 2014 by Zahnia Canul and Mia Quetzal. They joined the regional Network of Trans People in Latin America and the Caribbean, also known as RED LACTRANS, in 2016, and helped to establish the Network's Centre for the Documentation of the Trans Situation in Latin America and the Caribbean, also known as CEDOSTALC.

=== Activities ===
TIA Belize, described in 2019 as "the first and only NGO by and for transgender persons living in Belize", are constituted as a group of members who seek to "promote respect for their human rights and dignity as transgender persons". Towards this end, they have served as liaison for various national and overseas organisations undertaking similar work in the country, including US Agency for International Development, the UN Development Fund, the National AIDS Commission, UNIBAM, and RED LACTRANS.

== Empower Yourself Belize Movement ==
Empower Yourself Belize Movement
- Abbreviation: EYBM
- Formation: January 2015
- Type: NGO
- Region served: Belize
- Director: Kendale Trapp
- President: Kenny White
- Vice President: Monica Usher
- Treasurer: Hazel McField
- Website: empoweryourselfbelize.org

The Empower Yourself Belize Movement, also known as EYBM, are a Belize-based non-governmental organisation that advocate for queer individuals, particularly young ones and those with HIV/AIDS, in Belize. Their primary activities include HIV/AIDS clinics, public awareness marches, and workshops on HIV/AIDS and queer and human rights. Notably, on 20 August 2016, the organisation facilitated the first public celebration of queer pride in Belize, in collaboration with the Belize Family Life Association (BFLA).

== Belize Trans Colours ==
Belize Trans Colours
- Abbreviation: BTC
- Formation: October 2018
- Type: NGO
- Region served: Belize
- Director: Kenny White

Belize Trans Colours, also known as BTC, (Note: Plus: Belize Trans Colors.) are a Belize-based non-governmental organisation that advocate for queer individuals, particularly transgender ones, in Belize. They were registered as an NGO in October 2018, and are engaged in in-person outreach to transgender men and women, especially those involved in sex work in San Pedro, Ambergris Caye.

== See also ==
- LGBTQ rights in Belize
- Women's rights in Belize
- Violence against LGBTQ people in Belize

== Notes and references ==
=== References ===
1. "Home". Belize City: PETAL. 14 June 2021. Archived from the original on 22 November 2022.
2. Jackson, Reagan (2 April 2019). "Belize group builds movement for lesbian and bisexual community". Seattle Globalist. Seattle WA. Archived from the original on 8 December 2021.
3. UNIBAM (30 November 2013). "The value of PETAL Belizean Lesbian and Bisexual Women Conversations". Blog. Belize City: United Belize Advocacy Movement. Archived from the original on 28 July 2022.
4. UNIBAM (n.d.). "About | United Belize Advocacy Movement (UNIBAM)".
5. Facilitating Unfiltered Conversations in Safe Spaces, for Lesbian and Bisexual Women in Belize. Lessons Learned no. 52. Amsterdam: COC. 2019. ISBN 9789067530439. Archived from the original on 19 May 2022.
6. "Petal's Place". 7 News. Belize City: Naturalight Productions. 10 August 2021. Archived from the original on 22 November 2022.
7. "Trans In Action". 7 News. Belize City: Naturalight Productions. 22 March 2019.
8. CRG Strategic Initiative Project Reports – Belize (Report). New York: Global Action for Trans Equality. April 2020.
9. Belize CeDoSTALC Report 2018 (Report). Buenos Aires: Red Latinoamericana y del Caribe de Personas Trans. 27 March 2019.
10. Rosenblatt, Kalhan (1 August 2015). "On a mission: Transgender woman prepares for return to a dangerous place". Naples Daily News. Naples FL: Gannett Co.
11. Hill, Simone; Trapp, Kendale; White, Kenny (6 August 2019). "The LGBTQ Community is celebrating PRIDE Belize Week". Open Your Eyes (Interview). Channel 5 Belize. Interviewed by Marleni Cuellar and William Neal. Belize City: Great Belize Productions.
12. "Health and Care Day held in San Pedro". San Pedro Sun. San Pedro, Ambergris Caye. 20 June 2022.
13. "Belize Youth Empowerment for Change (BYEC)". London: One Young World. 2017.
14. "Stephen Daniel Diaz". Washington DC: Meridian International Center.
15. Diaz, Stephen (29 October 2016). "Stephen Diaz, Executive Director of Belize Youth Empowerment for Change on All That's Left Radio 10-29-16". All That's Left Radio Show (Interview). Interviewed by James Robinson and Clete Wetli.
16. "George Andrew Arthurs". Oakland CA: GOJoven International. 2012.
17. "Belize Gay Pride Guide and Advice". Manchester, England: Globetrotter Guys. 20 February 2018.
18. "Belize Youth Empowerment for Change". Friends of Caracol Newsletter. Belize City; Chesham, England: Caracol - Youth Community Development. April 2019. p. 6.
19. Ricketts, Tisha (22 December 2017). "BELIZE: Youth Advisory Member Stephen Diaz- "Young Persons Are In A Vulnerable Position"". MyCaribbeanScoop.
20. Muñoz-Pogossian, Betilde; Vidal, Mariette (April 2018). Youth, Peace and Security in the Americas: Risks and Opportunities for Central American and Caribbean Youth (Report). Youth4Peace. Washington DC: Organisation of American States. Archived from the original on 9 April 2019.
21. "Home". Belize City: Empoyer Yourself Belize Movement. 22 May 2017 – 17 January 2021. Archived from the original on 17 January 2021.
22. "Our Partners". Belmopan: Human Rights Commission of Belize.
23. "Staff & Board of Directors". Belize City: Our Circle. Archived from the original on 22 November 2022.
24. "Home". Belize City: Our Circle. Archived from the original on 22 November 2022.
25. "Our Circle". New York: Idealist. Archived from the original on 22 November 2022.
26. "Derricia (Jael) Castillo-Salazar – Biography". New York: ARC International. 13 March 2017. Archived from the original on 22 November 2022.
27. Deonarain, Lissa (1 July 2022). "LGBTQ+ Organizations in the Caribbean Doing Powerful Work". New York: Media Sutra. Archived from the original on 22 November 2022.
28. Weinstein, Ari (1 October 2020). "Derricia Castillo-Salazar – Our Circle, Belize". Covington LA: Independent. Archived from the original on 22 November 2022.
29. 2021-2023 Strategic Plan: From Vision to Results (Report). Belize City: Our Circle. 2020. Archived from the original on 22 November 2022.
30. Quarterly Report – Q4 2020 (Report). Belize City: Our Circle. 2020. Archived from the original on 22 November 2022.
31. International LGBT Advocacy Organizations and Programs: An Overview (Report). Denver CO: Movement Advancement Project. July 2008. Archived from the original on 4 June 2022.
32. Orozco, Caleb (23 November 2012). "My life as an activists in Belize". Blogger. Mountain View, CA: Google.
