= Legal education in England =

Academic and professional education in the laws of England

Legal education in England is the practice of teaching and learning English Law, whether to become a practicing lawyer or as an academic pursuit. Legal education has undergone significant changes over the last two thousand years, transforming from an exclusively apprenticeship-based process to one split across secondary education, the university, and the profession. Currently, university law degrees are regulated by the legal profession, which controls the core subjects a law degree must contain before graduates can pursue further professional qualification.

== History ==
=== Medieval and early modern England ===
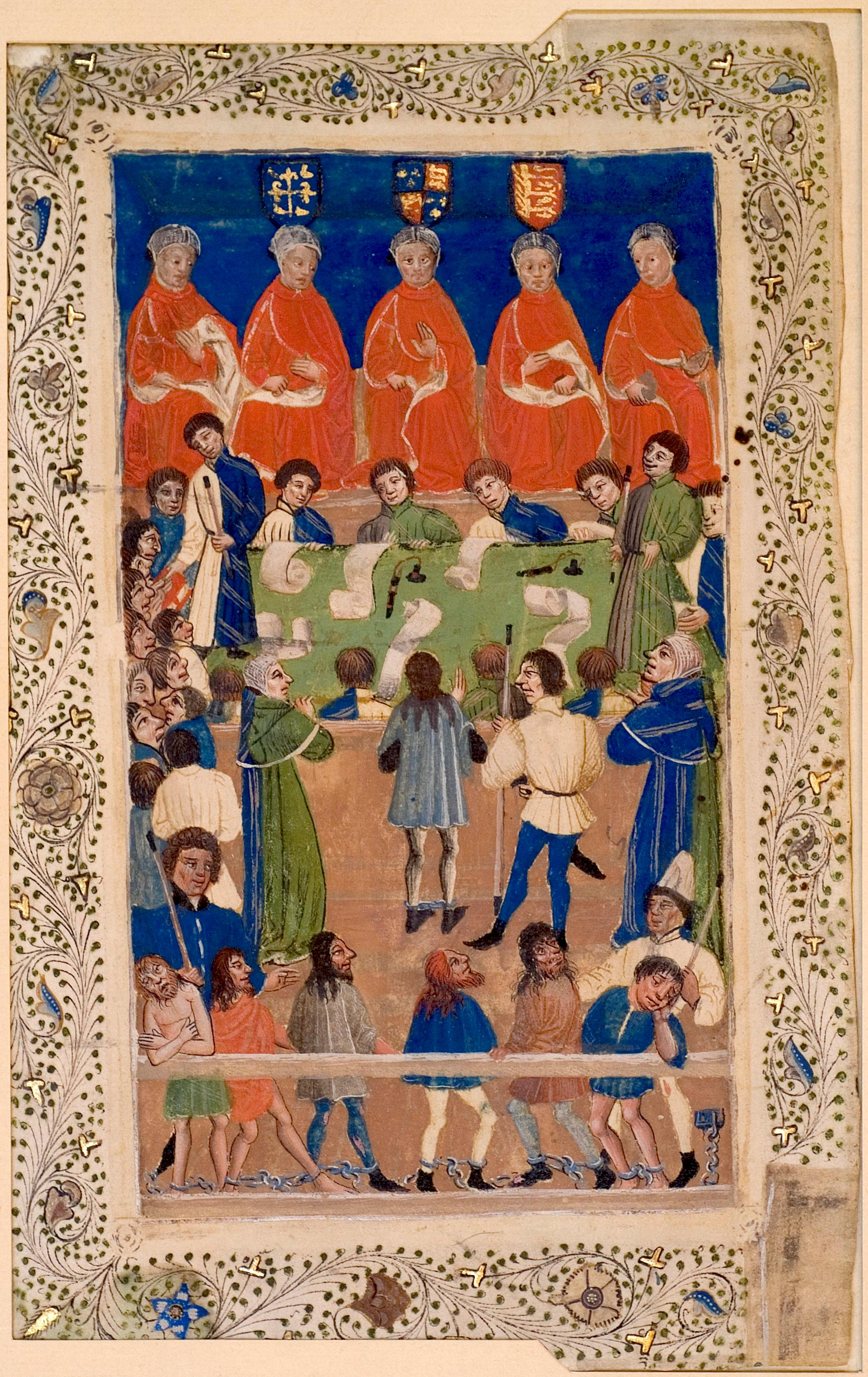
Law apprentices used to learn English law by attending court and listening to the legal arguments in the 'Crib'

Early judges in the 12th century, called justiciarii, did not undergo legal education and operated more like civil servants than trained lawyers. In the early 13th century, a body of legal professionals split between advocates and attorneys, emerged who mediated between the judge and litigant. It was accepted at this early stage judges needed significant technical skills and that they should be accepted by the leading members of the bar. Nonetheless, the legal profession remained strictly detached from the university and church. The emergence of a professional body necessitated the creation of an educational process. By the mid-13th century an early law school had come into existence, though few records of its activities remain. Students were called 'apprentices' and learned by attending court in a special gallery section called the 'Crib.'

In the 14th century, the Lawyer's Inns formed. Originally these were inns of residence primarily used by apprentices and other lawyers. These inns took on a more corporate form, though they never had articles of incorporation or a charter, and took over from the early law school in training future lawyers. The educational process involved lectures and debates called 'disputations' in the halls of the inns, and there were disciplinary rules like those found in the university. Disputations followed a common pattern: a series of facts would be stated, then followed with a question of law. Apprentices would then study different arguments relating to the legal point. Students also produced reports of court proceedings and would study the reports of others as part of their learning process. It is possible the early year books were the work of these apprentices. There was little direct supervision and students were expected to largely teach themselves. In the later 14th century, four inns attained prominence, called the 'Inns of Court', which acted as parent institutions of the other smaller inns, known collectively as the 'inns of chancery.'

In the Tudor period, the inns remained the dominant form of legal education. Students had to carry out oral legal debates (moots), and exercises based on writs. Altogether, the smaller inns and the Inns of Court formed an education complex roughly the size of Cambridge and were referred to as the 'Third University of England.' After studying in the inns of Chancery, a student aspiring to the bar would attend one of the Inns of Court for seven years, visiting court, engaging in more advanced debates, reading and copying law books, and going to lectures. Senior barristers also gave lectures on statutes twice a year called 'readings.' Lectures would be centred on specific texts, read out, and discussed by the lecturer and students. As a consequence of their educational role, lectures and teaching in the inns of court also had the potential to shape future legal doctrine. By the 17th century, however, these lectures declined in importance and the system eventually collapsed after the inns were abandoned due to civil war. Throughout the 18th century, to the late 19th century, formal legal education was very disorganised and future lawyers relied on self-directed apprenticeships of varying quality. Students informally met in coffee houses to hold disputations and would form unofficial clubs to discuss law more theoretically.

=== Creation of law as a university subject ===
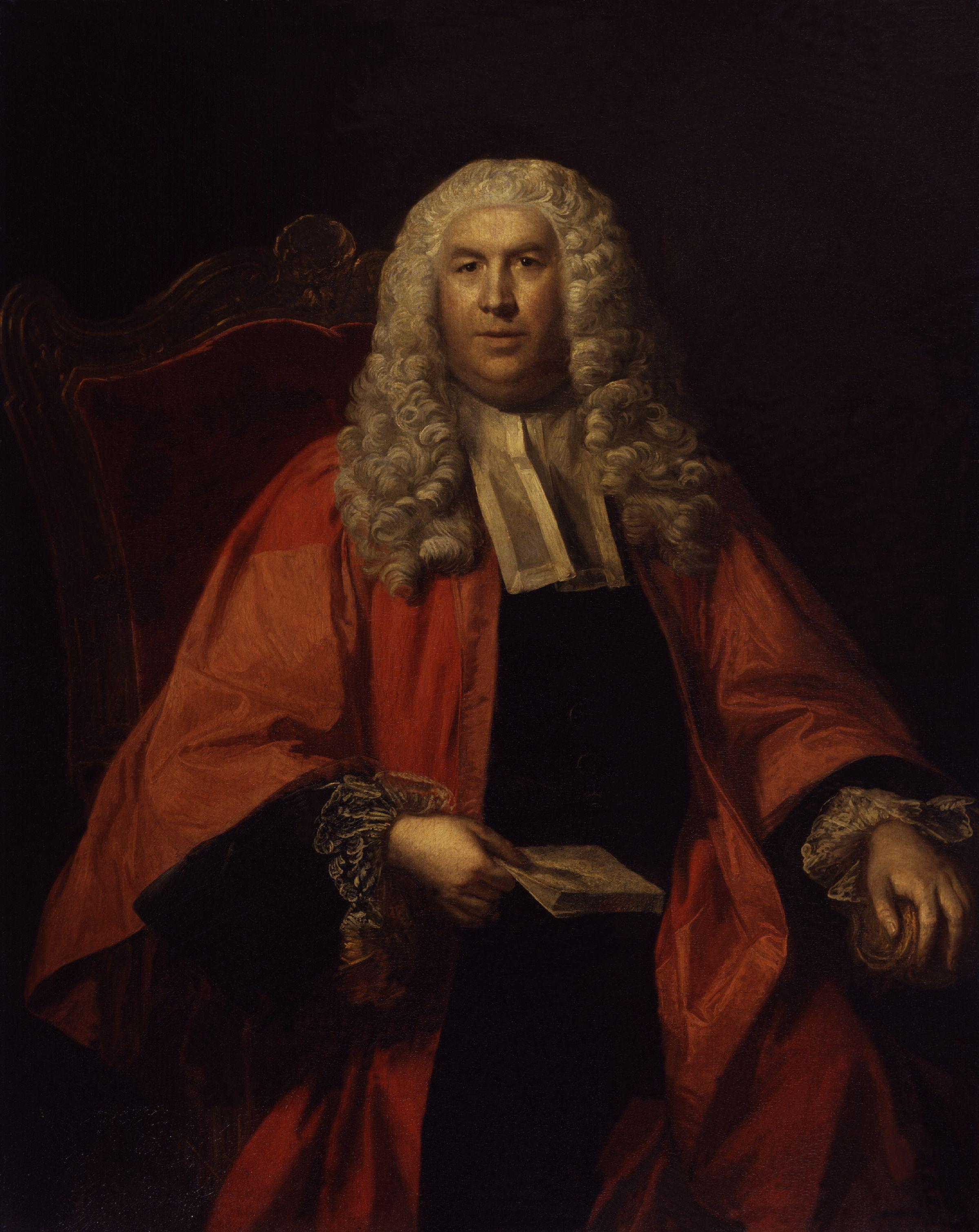
Sir William Blackstone gave the first series of university lectures on English law at Oxford in 1758. These formed the basis of his influential Commentaries.

The first university English law lecture series was given by Dr William Blackstone at in Oxford in 1753. These lectures continued for several years and in 1758 they received an endowment called the Vinerian professorship. However, Blackstone's lectures, aimed at laypeople, did not remain popular after he left and there was a hiatus in university legal education. In the mid 19th century, various universities experimented with law courses, trying out different models and contents. Cambridge University attempted to establish the Downing chair of legal studies in 1800. However, the plan failed, and for most of the 19th century it was a sinacure. Andrew Amos and John Austin attempted to produce a new law course in 1828 in the University of London. Again, it faded away as Austin resigned and Amos, whose charisma had attracted students resigned. By 1900 it had only produced 135 graduates. The state of English legal education was such that in 1846, The House of Commons Select Committee on Legal Education stated:

No legal education worthy of the name, is at this moment to be had in either England or Ireland."

Very few professionals had read law at university in this period. Instead, to pass the professional qualifications it was common for prospective solicitors to go to 'crammers' or other private law schools. Despite this, there was widespread debate in this period over the proper purpose of legal education at University, to the extent Krook calls it the 'molten period' of legal education. There was a strong movement to establish the university as a liberal institution aimed at the pursuit of knowledge, rather than for practical purposes. In this climate, Law did not fit in neatly and instead tried to look outward to the profession for legitimacy. These two trends together meant law as university subject had a low reputation amongst both the profession and academia. In this period, the number of law students and teachers remained modest, around 2500 and 130 respectively in 1933.

=== 20th century legal education ===
The post-war period saw a massive increase in the number of law students compared to the late 19th and early 20th century. The number of law students increased from 1515 in 1938–39 to 3000 in 1959–60. A driving factor in this was the changing structure of the post-war university, with much higher public funding to match a greater demand for higher education. Twining points out that the rise in law students matches proportionally the general rise in students across the university. In this period, the law faculty remained small with low funding and a proportionally small student base compared to university as a whole. 1950s Law was not held in high regard academically and most aspiring barristers continued to attend cram schools. Debates over the proper role of undergraduate were muted in this period, though a notable contribution from Professor L.C.B Grower in 1950 argued that university should teach law in its social context as a theoretical base, leaving the practical education to the profession.

By the end of the 1960s, the number of law students doubled again, reaching 3000, and many new law schools were set up. Following 1965, the debate about legal education became more pronounced. One movement argued law ought to be taught as part of a general liberal education, and thus linked with the social sciences. In 1971 the Ormrod Report was published, setting the path for most subsequent development in legal education. The Report recommended splitting legal education into three stages: academic, professional, and continuing. The academic stage was to be carried out by the universities, though professional bodies reserved the power to recognise whether a course allowed access to the second stage. This amounts to supervision and the requirement for law courses to teach mandatory subjects. Barristers and solicitors could not agree on a joint professional qualification and instead instituted separate professional examinations in their private institutions, cutting off the potential for public funding. One of the consequences of the Ormrod Report is that law became a graduate profession, removing five year articles of clerkship as an alternative route. Previously only 40% of solicitors had completed law degrees. The same occurred in 1979 for barristers, who were required to sit a qualifying law degree before they could undertake further professional education.

Post-Ormrod, the number of law students increased dramatically to 20,000 in 1991, and woman law students rose significantly, now constituting two thirds of law students. As a result, law students now make up around 5% of the university population and, due to increasing popularity, the subject has become more competitive. Further, law courses have diversified, going beyond purely blackletter law. Kent Law school, for example tried an interdisciplinary approach, Birmingham Polytechnic required clinical practice for all three years, and SOAS successfully designed a law course which could cover international legal connections whilst qualifying. Boon and Webb argue that Ormrod's role in detaching the stages of qualification has resulted in law being a more diverse and interesting subject.

== Modern legal education ==
=== Legal education at secondary school ===
English Law was created as an English A-level and AS subject in 2017. A-level Law covers tort law, contract law, human rights law, the structure of the legal system, and philosophical debates in law, such as the nature of justice. A-level law is not required to study law at university.

Some universities require prospective law applicants to carry out the National Admissions Test for Law (LNAT). This test was developed by Oxford University to assess close reading, analytical, and argumentative skills in applicants.

=== Law at university ===
English Law is a popular undergraduate subject in English universities. In 2020, 29,565 domestic students applied to study law, of which 20,905 were accepted, alongside 4,670 international students. Studying law at the undergraduate level is usually necessary before a student can undergo further professional education. For a law degree to qualify students for further education, it must meet certain criteria set out by the Law profession. Specifically, the degree must contain the 'Seven Core Subjects' or the Foundations of Legal Knowledge, Criminal Law, Land Law, Tort Law, Equity and Trusts, Constitutional Law, Contract Law and European Union Law. Beyond these seven core subjects, Law degrees across England differ in their content. In some universities, students can study law and another honours. For example, law and a modern language, law and business, law and politics. A select number of universities offer non-qualifying law degrees, Law BA, which combine law with other approaches, such as law and history and law and economics.

It is possible to study an undergraduate degree other than a qualifying Law degree and then subsequently convert by gaining Graduate Diploma in Law (GDL). The GDL can take between one and two years. As of September 2021, the GDL and is being replaced with professional course, the SQE, combined with the Legal Practice Course. Reports from law firms and the Bar Association show 50% of trainee solicitors undertaking training contracts in 2019 were GDL graduates and 25% of trainee barristers undertaking a pupillage.

Law is also studied academically at a graduate level. Many universities offer more specialised master's courses in law which, though not necessary to practice, investigate legal topics at a more advanced level. These include research masters courses lasting one to two years aimed at training legal research skills. It is also possible to study law at a PhD level in a wide variety of areas and disciplines, such as legal history, international law, legal sociology, and law and economics.

=== Professional education ===
Following university, trainee lawyers must undergo further professional education. For solicitors, this constitutes one year studying for the Legal Practice Course (LPC) followed by a 'period of recognised training' for two years training at a solicitors firm. The LPC covers a mixture of professional and substantive topics, though excludes pure skills based training and ethical education. As a consequence of being assessed by private institutions, the LPC is not funded publicly and can be expensive for students to fund themselves. After these two years, the student becomes a fully qualified solicitor. To become a barrister, it is necessary to become a member of one of the Inns of Court and complete the vocational stage of qualifying. Following the Future Bar Training (FBT)reforms, which saw the end of the BPTC, new pathways of completing the Bar Course have been established. This includes taking the course by way of two separate parts, Part One costing considerably less than Part Two, which was implemented as a form of cost effectiveness. If the student passes the vocational stage (Bar Course), they are then called to the bar by their Inn. However, before they can become a practicing barrister, the student also needs to secure a pupillage at a barrister set which lasts one year. This constitutes training on the job, shadowing senior barristers.

== Contemporary debates in legal education ==
=== Law as a vocation and Law as a liberal subject ===
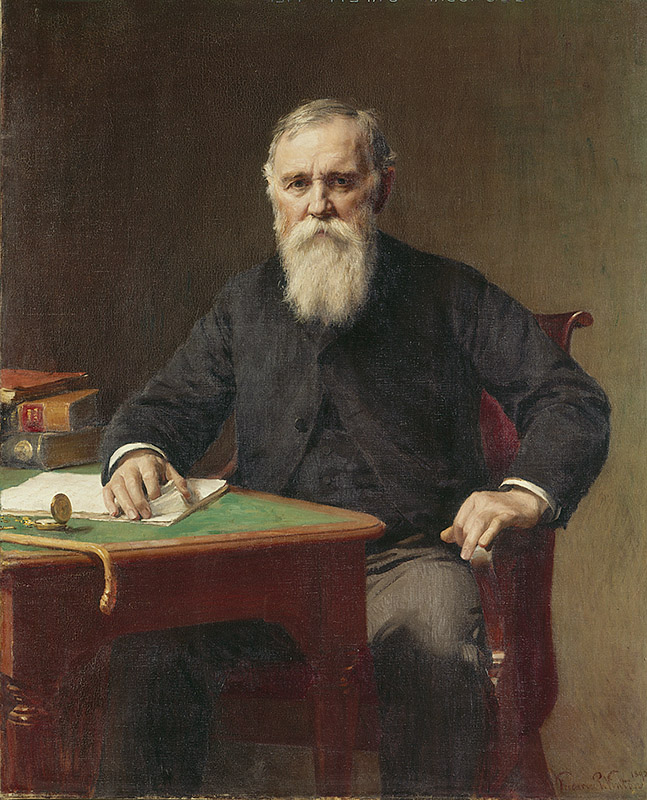
Langdell's case method, focusing on teaching legal rules and their application, has been influential in England.

A long-running debate in the history of English and Common law education is whether Law at university should function primarily as vocational preparation for future lawyers or whether it should constitute part of a student's wider liberal education. Blackstone, for example, argued that law could only be taught as part of a wider liberal education, including moral and political philosophy, history, logic and reasoning, experimental philosophy and classics. Similarly, Charles Rann Kennedy, the creator of the law course in Queen's College Birmingham in 1849, argued that law ought to be taught as part of a 'classical education.' Conversely, the American jurist Christopher Langdell developed a model of legal education, the case method, which focused exclusively on the kind of legal reasoning an advocate would use in court. A correlative of the case method's focus was that it is almost entirely focused on technical, doctrinal law, excluding social context, moral philosophy, and wider contextual analysis. This led him to clash with Roscoe Pound, a leading developer of sociological jurisprudence, who wanted to include social reality and jurisprudence as part of law. Despite Roscoe's opposition, the case method has proven very influential in England and the study of black-letter law now constitutes a large part of the undergraduate's study. Twining is critical of this development and argues it has had transferred to student culture, with students rejecting subjects closer to the liberal arts when they were offered in the 1990s.

=== Debate over the Core Seven Subjects ===
The profession's control of the seven mandatory subjects for a qualifying law degree has provoked criticism from legal academics. Peter Birks argued that the 'core' approach unduly restricts undergraduate courses and has a deleterious effect on the quality of legal science. Not only does it lead to the core subjects being taught at a very superficial level, he suggests the subjects themselves not are obvious 'foundations' and thus exclude other important subjects. Similarly, Twining argues the choice of subjects was 'intellectually dubious' and criticises the slow creep from five to seven mandatory subjects. In contrast, the Ormerod Report, which originally established the core, suggested they were chosen "because it is difficult to devise an adequate course in English Law which does not include them."

=== Modernising legal education ===
Various commentators have proposed that legal education in England needs to be modernised to suit the 21st legal landscape. Twining, for example, argues that university legal education needs to be 'Globalised' to suit the increasingly international and inter-jurisdictional nature of legal practice. A global legal education, according to Twining, would train students to think about the wider world with broader perspectives and to use concepts which can travel across different legal systems. Other reformers propose Law at university needs to be decolonised, moving away from a narrow focus on national law and taking into account the varied and detailed process by which English Law was spread across the commonwealth.

== See also ==
- Legal education in the United Kingdom
