= Human Dignity Trust =

UK charitable organization

Human Dignity Trust is a UK-based registered charity that focuses on strategic litigation challenging the criminalisation of homosexuality around the world. It was founded in 2011 by Jonathan Cooper and Tim Otty QC. Cooper led the organization until 2016, and as of 2022 it is led by Téa Braun.

== Organization ==
Human Dignity Trust's team consists of lawyers, activists, researchers, and communications specialists who work with LGBT organizations, activists, and local attorneys worldwide to defend LGBT rights.
