= Maurice Tomlinson =

Jamaican gay rights activist (born 1971)

- Tomlinson in 2015
- Born: 9 April 1971 (age 55); Montego Bay, Jamaica
- Education: University of the West Indies, University of Calgary, University of Turin
- Years active: 2003–present
- Awards: David Kato Vision & Voice Award 2012

Maurice Tomlinson (born 1971) is a Jamaican lawyer, law professor, and gay rights activist currently living in Toronto, Ontario, Canada. He has been a leading gay rights and HIV activist in the Caribbean for over 20 years and is one of the only Jamaican advocates to challenge the country's 1864 British colonially-imposed anti gay Sodomy Law (known as the Buggery Law). This law predominantly affects men who have sex with men (MSM) and carries a possible jail sentence of up to ten years imprisonment with hard labour.

== Early life ==
Tomlinson was born on 9 April 1971 in Montego Bay, St, James, Jamaica, to George Cornel Tomlinson and Carmen Victoria Tomlinson (née Campbell). He has two brothers, Kurt and Rhoan. Tomlinson attended Cornwall College and Kingston College (Jamaica). At the tertiary level, his education includes studies at The University of the West Indies, Mona (1993), University of Calgary, Haskayne School of Business (1998), University of the West Indies, Cave Hill (2003), Norman Manley Law School in Jamaica (2005), the University of Turin Law School, Italy (2006), and the University of the West Indies, Mona School of Business (2007).

After graduation in 1993, Tomlinson returned to Air Jamaica and started his then "dream" job as a flight attendant. However, he left the airline after only 6 months when his boss advised him to "stand in front of a mirror, try to act more macho and deepen his voice" because passengers had complained that he was gay. Tomlinson later went to work for a mortgage company. It was while pursuing a law degree that Tomlinson became interested in international human rights work. His studies in law also gave him an interest in Human Rights, especially for LGBTI people, and taught him that it was possible to change discriminatory laws and practices.

In 2006, he started working as a corporate lawyer and left after a year and a half to become the project manager in the Office of the Principal of the University of West Indies. In this post, Tomlinson was responsible for the establishment of the UWI's Western Jamaica Campus in his hometown of Montego Bay. In 2009, Tomlinson began teaching human rights and discrimination law at the University of Technology, Jamaica and also became Legal Advisor, Marginalized Groups for the international NGO, AIDS-Free World.

== Activism ==
Tomlinson previously served as legal advisor on the boards of Jamaica AIDS Support for Life (JASL) as well as the Jamaica Forum for Lesbians All-Sexuals and Gays (J-FLAG). He still visits Jamaica regularly to participate in legal challenges to anti-gay laws.

Jamaican men who have sex with men (MSM) have the highest HIV prevalence rate in the western hemisphere, at 33%. UNAIDS, the Jamaican Ministry of Health, and other regional and international agencies involved in the HIV response have identified that the overwhelming homophobia in Jamaica drives MSM underground, away from effective HIV prevention, treatment, care, and support interventions.

Since 2008, Tomlinson has therefore been working with local and international partners to increase the visibility of Jamaican LGBTI people in order to improve their access to health care and specifically HIV services. In this regard, he has led several public initiatives, including public service announcements, Jamaica's first Walk for Tolerance, multiple public demonstrations, a successful letter writing campaign to the Jamaican newspapers, and spearheaded meetings with senior government, diplomatic, and civic officials.

Tomlinson also travels around the Caribbean for the Canadian HIV/AIDS Legal Network providing human rights documentation and advocacy training for groups working with LGBTI individuals.

=== Buggery Law ===
The Buggery Law is a British colonial law imposed on Jamaica during the British occupation of the country. Tomlinson was one of the first people to legally challenge that law, having filed a case in 2011. Tomlinson was opposed by Christian groups who marched in protest over keeping the law.

Speaking to PinkNews in London after a lecture to mark the 2014 International Day Against Homophobia and Transphobia, Tomlinson challenged Jamaica's Prime Minister, Portia Simpson-Miller, for putting aside the issue of the country's anti-sodomy law and not carrying on with it as she had promised in her election campaign. In April 2014, the Jamaican Prime Minister said "The issue was not the priority of the majority of poor people living in the country so it is not an issue that needed attention." Her decision was seen as a betrayal to the LGBT community that supported her in the election. The issue of homophobia in Jamaica remains unresolved after multiple attacks on and murders of gay men.

=== PSA challenge ===
On behalf of the Canadian HIV/AIDS Legal Network, Tomlinson is the appellant in a Jamaican Court of Appeal matter challenging two local TV stations that refused to air an ad in which he appears that calls on Jamaicans to respect the rights of homosexuals. The TV stations refused to air the ad on the grounds that it would anger the island's powerful churches and could also be seen to be aiding and abetting an illegal activity. Although the Supreme Court ruled against Tomlinson's claim, they did acknowledge the importance of the case and refused an application from the TV stations that Tomlinson pay their legal costs. The court also clarified for the first time that gay Jamaicans have all the rights of other citizens under the 2011 Charter of Fundamental Rights and Freedoms. This is a significant precedent as the country's Parliament had deliberately excluded sexual orientation, gender identity, and gender expression from protection against discrimination under the Charter.

=== LGBT immigration Bans ===
Tomlinson filed a challenge in 2013 to the immigration ban of both Trinidad and Tobago and Belize. He asked Jamaica, his home country, to insist that the travel bans of these countries be removed based on CARICOM provisions for free movement of citizens of member countries. Jamaica refused and Tomlinson went to the Caribbean Court of Justice asking leave to file the case with them directly. In May, 2014, Tomlinson was granted leave to challenge the immigration laws of both countries, in a case brought on his behalf by AIDS-Free World. In October, 2014, CARICOM joined the case as an interested party supporting Tomlinson's arguments. On 17–18 March 2015, the challenge was heard with allegations that the immigration bans abridge the rights of free movement for Caribbean citizens contained in the Treaty of Chaguaramas. Judgment was reserved by the court for a future date.

=== Dwayne's House ===
Dwayne Jones, a 16-year-old transgender youth was beaten, stabbed, shot and run over by a mob when she arrived at a street party dressed in female clothes. Her friends said she was wearing female clothes in an attempt to 'come out of the closet'. Within weeks a gay businessman from Montego Bay was found murdered inside his home on 28 August 2013, whose murder was published by an online group on YouTube called Jamaican LGBT News.

In 2013, Tomlinson became a founding member of Dwayne's House, Jamaica's first charity which focuses exclusively on providing food and basic services to homeless LGBTI youth who have been forced to live in the sewers of the capital, Kingston.

== Personal life ==
Tomlinson was married to a close female friend in 1999 in an attempt to "cure" his homosexuality. The couple divorced 4 years later and they have one son who now lives with his mother.

In 2011, Tomlinson married his partner Tom Decker in Canada. Decker was the LGBT liaison officer for the Toronto Police Service, and he and Tomlinson met in 2010 at an International Lesbian and Gay Association (ILGA) World Conference. Their activism is central to their marriage, although he and Tomlinson had to flee Jamaica temporarily in 2012 when a Jamaican newspaper carried an unauthorized photograph of their wedding, leading to several death threats against Tomlinson. He now teaches Canadian Human Rights and other law courses at the University of Ontario Institute of Technology in Oshawa, Canada, and is also a Senior Policy Analyst for the Canadian HIV/AIDS Legal Network, where he focuses on challenging homophobia and HIV in the Caribbean. Decker also developed an award-winning program to report homophobic violence while he worked for the Toronto Police. On behalf of AIDS-Free World, Decker revised this program for the Caribbean. He now travels with Tomlinson to deliver this training to Caribbean civil society groups, as well as provide LGBTI sensitization sessions for Caribbean police.

== Awards and nominations ==
Year	Nominated	Award	Result
2012	Maurice Tomlinson	David Kato Vision & Voice Award	Won

In 2011, Tomlinson was awarded the inaugural "David Kato Vision and Voice Award" which was created to honor the memory of slain Ugandan LGBTI activist, David Kato. This award recognizes leadership in advocating for the rights of LGBTI people. In 2012, Tomlinson was privileged to be the first-ever Grand Marshall of Ugandan Beach Pride. He was also selected as the International Grand Marshall for Capital Pride in Ottawa, Canada. His work has since been featured in a documentary, The Abominable Crime, which describes the struggle with homophobia in Jamaica and efforts being made to challenge this seemingly intractable problem.

== See also ==
- LGBT rights in Jamaica
