= Violence against LGBTQ people in Belize =

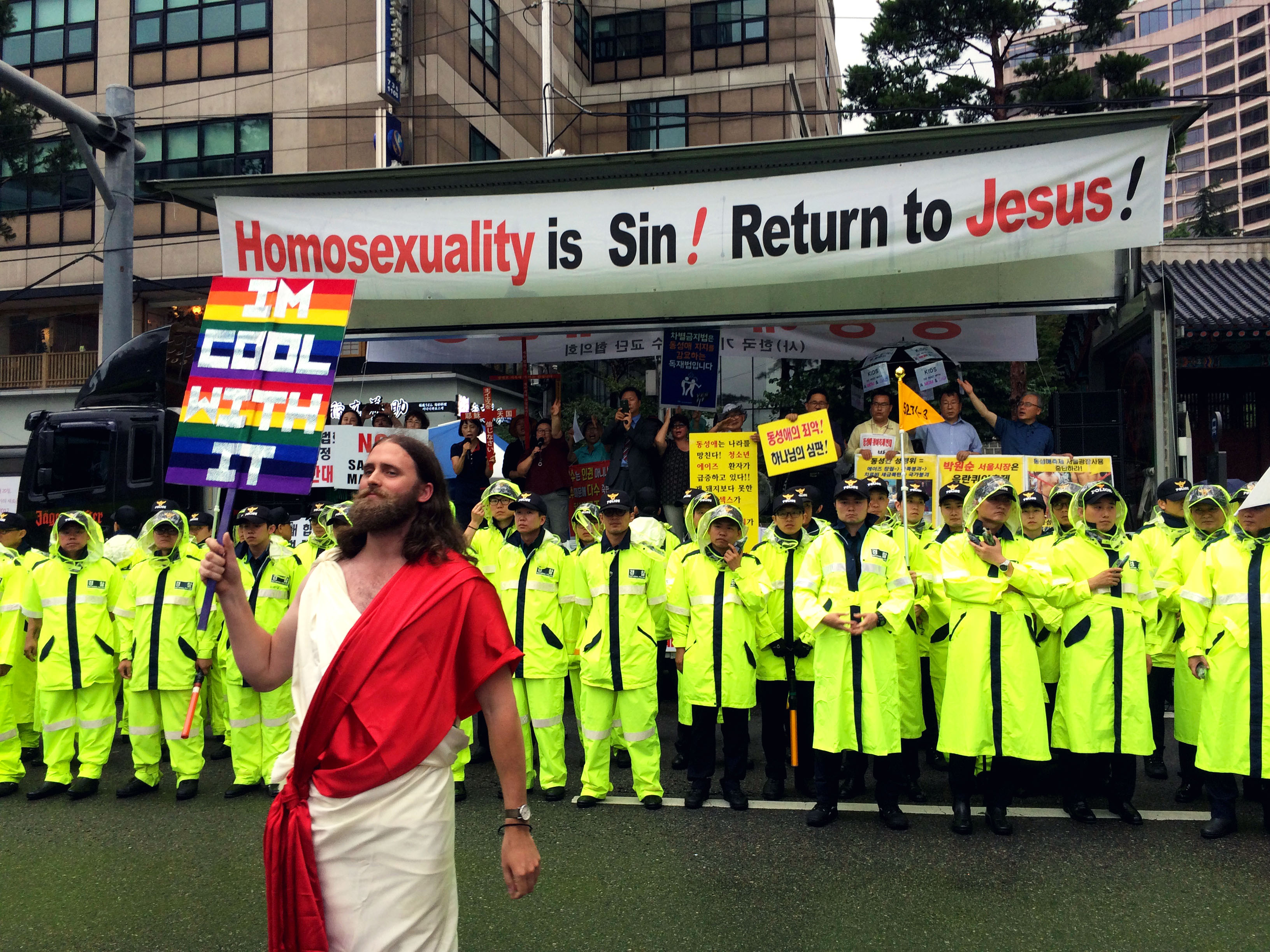
Christian right influence is deemed a primary driver of violence against queer people in Belize

LGBTQ people in Belize are particularly vulnerable to physical and non-physical violence, both from non-state and state actors. All physical (and some non-physical) forms of such violence are criminalised, but victims face significant barriers to redress. Some non-physical forms are rather state-sanctioned and lawful. Most violence is thought to be driven by prejudice against LGBTQ people (homophobia, biphobia, transphobia), which in turn is thought to be primarily stoked by the Christian right, Christian fundamentalism, or toxic masculinity. Said violence is deemed significantly detrimental to the health and welfare of over 22,000 queer (LGBTQ) individuals in the country, including families and children.

== History ==
Violence against LGBTQ people may not have been so widespread in precolonial days, as buccaneers-turned-Baymen are thought to have been relatively liberal towards same-sex intimacy (ostensibly due to the scarcity of women back then). Early Maya and Creole Baymen may have been similarly tolerant (ostensibly due to possibly liberal Mesoamerican and West African customs prior to European contact). The establishment of Christian parishes in 1776 (Anglican, then others), replacement of Baymen's custom with British common law in 1840, and passing of the Criminal Code Act 1888 would have likely quashed any such tolerance by the late 19th century by formally criminalising non-heteronormative and non-cisnormative acts and expressions. This state of lawful intolerance of and violence towards queer Belizeans is thought to have remained unchallenged through the 20th and into the 21st century.

The 2000s saw the country's earliest efforts to curb queerphobic violence, beginning with the founding of the United Belize Advocacy Movement (UNIBAM) in 2006. Notable amongst these have been the 2013 government-backed gender policy (government policy for gender equality), public queer pride celebrations since 2015, the successful UNIBAM case in 2016, Belize's acceptance of most UN Universal Periodic Review recommendations regarding queer people in 2018, and the 2020 bipartisan Equal Opportunities Bill (for equal opportunity, or against discrimination on prohibited grounds).

== Types ==
Acts of overt violence against LGBTQ people by private citizens have been unlawful since Belize's founding (as with overtly violent acts against any person), and seem to be frowned upon across the West Indies today (2020s). Such offences are nonetheless not unheard of, with queer Belizeans being subjected to physical or sexual assaults, and even murders, by virtue of being queer (hate crimes). For instance, UNIBAM recorded "over 80 murders of LGBT persons" in 1995–2021. Queer Belizeans are further subject to not-so-overt acts of violence, including verbal harassment, emotional abuse, deprivation of services (housing, schooling, employment, healthcare), and exclusion from spaces (family, social, religious, business). Altogether, a 2022 ReportOUT (a UK charity) poll found 88 percent of queer Belizeans had experienced some form of violence, mostly verbal abuse (30 percent), online abuse (24), threats of violence (20), and violent physical or sexual assaults (11 percent). Similarly, the Caribbean Vulnerable Communities Coalition (CVC; a Jamaican charity) recorded 50 physical and non-physical violent incidents against queer people in Belize in 2018–2022 (mostly gender-based violence, physical abuse, verbal abuse, and emotional abuse, in descending order), most of which occurred in the community or workplace, with victims overwhelmingly opting to forego official action against perpetrators. This compared to 189 such incidents recorded by CVC for 2013–2018 (mostly physical violence, and verbal harassment, in descending order).

Acts of state violence against queer nationals take both physical forms (police brutality), and non-physical forms (police harassment; abuse of authority; and deprivation of rights, liberties, and services). For instance, eight percent of queer Belizeans reported having experienced police brutality in a 2022 poll, while a further thirteen percent reported having been blackmailed by police, and eight percent having been harassed or harmed by other servants of the Crown (defence forces, social services, and so on). Similarly, though Section 53 of the Criminal Code Act 1981 ostensibly applied to "every person who has carnal intercourse against the order of nature", the High Court found in 2016 that the Crown had been using said statute to disproportionately target queer people. As of 2024, various of the rights, liberties, and services afforded to straight and cisgender Belizeans are lawfully denied to their LGBTQ peers.

== Causes ==
Prejudice against LGBTQ people is widely deemed the primary cause of or motive for violence against them. Belizean society today (2020s) still presents relatively widespread levels of intolerance towards their queer members. Since the 2000s, the country has consistently scored in the 4–5 range (representing relatively middling acceptance of queer people) in the Global Acceptance Index (a standardised aggregate of global polls on attitudes towards queer people) by the Williams Institute. A 2022 ReportOUT (UK charity) poll found only 16 percent of queer Belizeans felt safe enough to be openly themselves amongst their religious community, compared to with healthcare staff (37 percent), employers (45), family (69), and close friends (89 percent). On the upside, some surveys indicate possibly diminishing levels of bigotry. For instance, a 2023 Latin American Public Opinion Project (LAPOP) poll found only 53 percent of Belizeans strongly disapproved of gay marriage (down from highs of 83 and 82 percent in 2012 and 2014, respectively), while only 37 percent strongly disapproved of gay candidates for office (down from highs of 59 and 67 percent in 2012 and 2014, respectively). Early 2010s polls found similarly heightened levels of queerphobic sentiment as the early LAPOP surveys. A 2013 poll by Caribbean Development Research Services (CADRES; a private Barbadian pollster) found 25 and 14 percent of Belizean men and women (respectively) hated gay people (when asked whether they "accept, tolerate or hate homosexuals", these respondents selected hate), while 47 and 28 percent of them (men and women respectively) would not socialise with gay people. Similarly, a 2012 Caribbean Community (CARICOM) poll found 81 percent of West Indian (including Belizean) teens "indicated that homosexuality was looked upon negatively by them".

Theories on what drives queerphobic prejudice in Belize vary a bit. For West Indian (including Belizean) men, Rosina Wiltshire (of the aforementioned 2012 CARICOM poll) suggested their significantly greater (than women's) prejudice might stem from their (strongly socially-reinforced) fear of being ridiculed as sissies, and thus of being deemed not real men (lacking manliness). Authors of the 2013 CADRES study drew similar conclusions from their comparable findings. A similar mechanism (machismo) has been suggested for Mestizo men. More generally though (for Belizean men and women), some studies have suggested that the Crown (via discriminatory laws, policies, and practices) and influential personalities and institutions in politics, in media, and in culture (via queerphobic rhetoric) both sanction and foster such intolerance. Further contributing factors may include HIV/AIDS stigma, classism, and ignorance or misunderstanding of issues affecting queer people. Nevertheless, the most often cited driver of bigotry against queer people is religious (specifically Christian right or fundamentalist) intolerance or zealotry.

Further causes of violence against queer people may include domestic or intimate partner violence.

=== Polls ===
Polls on Belizean attitudes towards LGBTQ people
Date	Question	neg (Note: This column lists the percentage of responses indicating prejudiced or negative attitudes towards queer people. Rounded to nearest integer.)	pos (Note: This column lists the percentage of responses indicating non-prejudiced or positive attitudes towards queer people. Rounded to nearest integer.)
2023	How strongly do you approve or disapprove of same-sex couples having the right to marry? 1,502 Belizean adults; 1 (strongly disapprove) to 3 is neg; 8 to 10 (strongly approve) is pos; 4–7 not shown	63	18
2023	How strongly do you approve or disapprove of homosexuals being permitted to run for public office? 720 Belizean adults; 1 (strongly disapprove) to 3 is neg; 8 to 10 (strongly approve) is pos; 4–7 not shown	48	24
2022	Have you experienced some form of abuse, threat or attack? 50 queer Belizean teens and adults; yes is neg; no is pos	88	12
2022	How widespread or rare is offensive language towards LGBTQ individuals? 50 queer Belizean teens and adults; very widespread and fairly widespread are neg; fairly rare and very rare are pos	55	45
2022	How widespread or rare is offensive language towards LGBTQ individuals from religious leaders? 50 queer Belizean teens and adults; very widespread and fairly widespread are neg; fairly rare and very rare are pos	77	23
2022	How widespread or rare is offensive language towards LGBTQ individuals in media? 50 queer Belizean teens and adults; very widespread and fairly widespread are neg; fairly rare and very rare are pos	50	50
2021	From what you have seen and heard, how do you think gay people are treated in Belize these days? 600 Belizean adult voters; they have special rights, they have equal rights, they are treated just like everyone else are neg; they have to fear for their safety and they are treated unfairly are pos; don't know not shown	28	69
2021	How likely are you to support anti-discrimination efforts based on the statement, "Nobody should be fired from their job or kicked out of their home just because they are lesbian, gay, bisexual, or transgender"? 600 Belizean adult voters; not likely at all and not too likely are neg; somewhat likely and very likely are pos; don't know not shown	32	66
2020	From what you have seen and heard, how do you think gay people are treated in Belize these days? 616 Belizean adult voters; they have special rights, they have equal rights, they are treated just like everyone else are neg; they have to fear for their safety and they are treated unfairly are pos; don't know not shown	22	68
2020	How likely are you to support anti-discrimination efforts based on the statement, "Nobody should be fired from their job or kicked out of their home just because they are lesbian, gay, bisexual, or transgender"? 616 Belizean adult voters; not likely at all and not too likely are neg; somewhat likely and very likely are pos; don't know not shown	31	63
2020	Would you mind having a homosexual person as a neighbour? 616 Belizean adult voters; would not like is neg; would not mind is pos; don't know not shown	23	62
2020	Would you mind having a transgender person as a neighbour? 616 Belizean adult voters; would not like is neg; would not mind is pos; don't know not shown	19	62
2014	How strongly do you approve or disapprove of same-sex couples having the right to marry? 1,522 Belizean adults; 1 (strongly disapprove) to 3 is neg; 8 to 10 (strongly approve) is pos; 4–7 not shown	89	5
2014	How strongly do you approve or disapprove of homosexuals being permitted to run for public office? 1,509 Belizean adults; 1 (strongly disapprove) to 3 is neg; 8 to 10 (strongly approve) is pos; 4–7 not shown	76	12
2013	Would you hang-out in public with homosexuals? 402 Belizean adult women; no is neg; yes is pos	28	72
2013	Would you hang-out in public with homosexuals? 371 Belizean adult men; no is neg; yes is pos	47	53
2013	Do you accept, tolerate or hate homosexuals? 402 Belizean adult women; hate is neg; accept and tolerate are pos	14	86
2013	Do you accept, tolerate or hate homosexuals? 371 Belizean adult men; hate is neg; accept and tolerate are pos	25	75
2012	How strongly do you approve or disapprove of same-sex couples having the right to marry? 735 Belizean adults; 1 (strongly disapprove) to 3 is neg; 8 to 10 (strongly approve) is pos; 4–7 not shown	88	4
2012	How strongly do you approve or disapprove of homosexuals being permitted to run for public office? 1,468 Belizean adults; 1 (strongly disapprove) to 3 is neg; 8 to 10 (strongly approve) is pos; 4–7 not shown	65	17
2012	Can a real man be homosexual? 202 Belizean second to sixth formers; no is neg; yes is pos; don't know not shown	72	17
2010	How strongly do you approve or disapprove of same-sex couples having the right to marry? 1,445 Belizean adults; 1 (strongly disapprove) to 3 is neg; 8 to 10 (strongly approve) is pos; 4–7 not shown	79	13
2010	How strongly do you approve or disapprove of homosexuals being permitted to run for public office? 1,432 Belizean adults; 1 (strongly disapprove) to 3 is neg; 8 to 10 (strongly approve) is pos; 4–7 not shown	58	23

== Legacy ==
Violence against LGBTQ people is deemed detrimental to their mental and physical health, safety of person, and financial security. These negative outcomes are most acute amongst the most vulnerable classes within the queer community, including children and teens, transgender people, people living with HIV/AIDS, and detainees.

A number of measures (both official and unofficial) have been taken in an effort to curb said violence. Notable examples include the work of various queer charities (public awareness, political advocacy, support services), that of several allied organisations (women's, HIV/AIDS, human rights), and even that of official bodies (several). As of 2022 though, a majority (57 percent) of queer Belizeans did not agree that there were enough support services available to them, with a further one in five reporting they had no support network (not even informal, like friends or family).

In popular culture, this sort of violence first gained visibility via news coverage of the late 2010 filing of the UNIBAM case, followed by heated debate for and against LGBTQ rights in 2011. In scholarship, violence against queer Belizeans remains mostly within the purview of grey literature (like NGO reports).

== See also ==
- Timeline of violence against LGBTQ people
- Timeline of violence against LGBTQ people in Belize
- Violence against LGBTQ people in Jamaica – a peer country

== Notes and references ==
=== References ===
1. "LGBT rights in Belize". Equaldex.
2. "AmericasBarometer Data Playground". LAPOP.
3. UNIBAM/SRI submission for the 1st UN UPR for Belize (Report). 2009.
4. Report on homophobia (Report). UNIBAM. 26 February 2009. Archived from the original on 9 July 2025.
5. Quetzal M (2010). Baseline research on transgender population (Report). CRTA. Archived from the original on 9 July 2025.
6. "Belizean LGBT Rights Violations". UNIBAM. 2011–2022.
7. Chanona J (28 July 2011). "The homosexuality debate in Belize: Should the state legislate morality?". 7 News.
8. Chanona J (12 October 2011). "The homosexuality debate in Belize: Can you pray away gay?". 7 News.
9. Wiltshire R (2012). Youth masculinities and violence in the Caribbean (PDF) (Report). CARICOM.
10. Adomakoh S, Chase M (28 August 2012). Report on SD among key community groups (Report). UK Aid/PANCAP. Archived from the original on 9 July 2025.
11. Belize country report (Report). ARC. 14 November 2012.
12. Evans CM (2013). "Challenging 'unnatural crimes': The connection between LGBTI rights and gender-specific sexual violence laws in Belize". Northwestern Journal of International Human Rights. 11 (2): 189–206.
13. UNIBAM/Heartland Alliance submission for Belize to the 107th UN HRC session (Report). 2013.
14. Beirich H (10 July 2013). Dangerous liaisons: The American religious right and the criminalization of homosexuality in Belize (Report). SPLC.
15. Reynolds L (29 August 2013). "The long battle to eradicate homophobia in Belize". NotiCen.
16. "A dollar amount linked to homophobia, a lack of security and dignity in Belize". UNIBAM. 14 January 2014.
17. Homophobia and transphobia in Caribbean media (Report). Outright Intl. 15 August 2015.
18. Belize LGBT community needs assessment (Report). Our Circle. 2016.
19. Beck EJ, Espinosa K, Ash T, Wickham P, Barrow C, Massiah E, Alli B, Nunez C (2017). "Attitudes towards homosexuals in seven Caribbean countries: Implications for an effective HIV response". AIDS Care. 29 (12): 1557–1566. doi:10.1080/09540121.2017.1316355.
20. Nicol N, Jjuuko A, Lusimbo R, Mule NJ, Ursel S, Wahab A, Waugh P, eds. (2018). Envisioning Global LGBT Human Rights: (Neo)colonialism, Neoliberalism, Resistance and Hope. London: University of London. doi:10.14296/818.9780993110283. ISBN 978-0-9931102-8-3.
21. Waters J, Budhwani H, Habun J, Hearld KR (1 August 2018). Estimation of key population size of men who have sex with men (MSM) and transgender women in Belize (Report).
22. Carrillo K (2019). Country report (Report). Stigma Index.
23. Demographic survey of same-sex couples in Belize (Report). Our Circle. 2019.
24. Lazarus L (2020). "Enacting citizenship, debating sex and sexuality: Conservative Christians' participation in legal processes in Jamaica and Belize". Commonwealth & Comparative Politics. 58 (3): 366–386. doi:10.1080/14662043.2020.1773115.
25. Castillo D (2020). The impact of Covid-19 on the LGBT community in Belize (Report). Our Circle.
26. Public opinion survey on national values and discrimination in Belize (Report). Live & Let Live. 14 September 2020.
27. Crehan P, Rezende L, Wolf J, Jordan P, Altincekic C, Miller J, Dovey K (2021). The economic case for LGBT+ inclusion in the Caribbean (Report). Open For Business.
28. Orozco C (31 March 2021). Situational analysis of investigative practices in law enforcement that undermine justice in Belize (Report). UNIBAM.
29. Orozco C (2 May 2021). Barriers to justice: LGBT systemic violence report (Report). UNIBAM.
30. Public opinion survey on national values and discrimination in Belize (Report). Live & Let Live. 28 July 2021.
31. BTC submission for the 4th UN UPR for Belize (Report). 2023.
32. EYBM/UNIBAM/PETAL submission for the 4th UN UPR for Belize (Report). 2023.
33. OUT in Belize (Report). ReportOUT. 2024.
34. Rambarran N (17 October 2024). Shared Incident Database analysis – Belize report (Report). CVC.
35. Crawford C (2025). Gender, Sexual Citizenship and Epistemic Injustice in the Caribbean. Cham, Switzerland: Palgrave Pivot. doi:10.1007/978-3-031-83493-6. ISBN 978-3-031-83493-6.
