= LGBTQ rights in the Caribbean =

Map of same-sex marriage policies in the Caribbean

LGBTQ rights differ between the various states in the Caribbean. They are influenced by previous colonization from Europe as well as each state's own interpretation of laws. For many of the states, perceptions of LGBTQ individuals are unfavorable, and laws lack protections and rights for the community.

== History ==
The Caribbean has been heavily colonized throughout history by European countries, with Spain, England, France and the Netherlands as the main colonizers, and the United States later on. With them came religion, particularly forms of Christianity such as Catholicism and Protestantism that would become integrated with many of the countries. This also came with it religious views that would encourage discrimination against LGBT members as well as direct legislation from the European countries. Most notable is Britain's Offences Against the Person Act 1861, which outlined many crimes and named sodomy as one of them. While some of these laws would be repealed over time, some Caribbean countries maintain their own legislation that continues to outlaw sexual acts among LGBT. A notable example is Jamaica, that has laws prohibiting anal sex as well as intimacy between same-sex individuals.

In 2000, the UK Government intervened on LGBT+ rights, issuing the Caribbean Territories (Criminal Law) Order 2000, which decriminalized consensual homosexual acts between adults in private in five British Overseas Territories: Anguilla, the British Virgin Islands, the Cayman Islands, Montserrat, and the Turks and Caicos Islands.

== Laws ==
Country	Laws regarding same-sex behavior	Laws regarding being transgender or non-binary
Anguilla	Sexual acts among consenting adults of the same sex became legal in 2001 due to an order from the British Government.; Same-sex marriage is illegal.	Transgender rights and protections are not recognized.
Antigua and Barbuda	Sexual acts among consenting adults of the same sex became legal in 2022.; Same-sex marriage is illegal.	Transgender rights and protections are not recognized.
Aruba	Sexual acts among consenting adults of the same sex became legal in 1869.; Same-sex marriage has been legal since court ruling in 2022.	Transgender rights and protections are not recognized.
Bahamas	Sexual acts among consenting adults of the same sex became legal in 1991.; Same-sex marriage is illegal as the Matrimonial Causes Act does not recognize them.	Transgender rights and protections are not recognized.
Barbados	Sexual acts among same-sex individuals became legal since 2022.; Same-sex marriage is unrecognized.; Employment discrimination on the basis of sexual orientation is illegal.	Legal gender changes not allowed; no protective laws; third genders not recognized.
Bonaire	Sexual acts among consenting adults of the same sex became legal in 1869 as it was legal in the Netherlands.; Same-sex marriage has been legal since 2012 with additions to the Civil Code in the Netherlands.	Gender changes on legal documents are allowed and gender-neutral documentation is available.
British Virgin Islands	Sexual acts among consenting adults of the same sex became legal in 2001 due to an order from the British Government.; Same-sex marriage illegal.; Discrimination of others due to sexual orientation is illegal according to the country's constitution.	Transgender rights and protections are not recognized.
Cayman Islands	Sexual acts among consenting adults of the same sex became legal in 2001 due to an order from the British Government.; Same-sex marriage illegal.	Transgender rights and protections are not recognized.
Cuba	Sexual acts among consenting adults of the same sex became legal in 1979.; Same-sex marriage has been legal since 2022.	Legal gender changes are allowed and gender confirmation procedures are covered by health care.
Curaçao	Sexual acts among consenting adults of the same sex became legal in 1869.; Same-sex marriage has been legal since court ruling in 2022.	Transgender rights and protections are not recognized.
Dominica	Sexual acts among consenting adults of the same sex became legal in 2024.; Same-sex marriage is illegal.	Transgender rights and protections are not recognized.
Dominican Republic	Sexual acts among consenting adults of the same sex became legal in 1822.; Same-sex marriage is illegal.	Transgender rights and protections are not recognized.
Grenada	Sexual acts among same-sex individuals is illegal.; Same-sex marriage is illegal.	Transgender rights and protections are not recognized.
Guadeloupe	Sexual acts among consenting adults of the same sex became legal in 1816; as a region of France, French laws apply.; Same-sex marriage has been legal since France passed a law in 2013.	Legal gender changes are allowed however there is no recognition of non-binary language or individuals.
Haiti	Sexual acts among consenting adults of the same sex became legal in 1791.; Same-sex marriage is illegal.	Transgender rights and protections are not recognized.
Jamaica	Sexual acts among same-sex individuals is illegal.; Same-sex marriage is illegal.	Transgender rights and protections are not recognized.
Martinique	Sexual acts among consenting adults of the same sex became legal in 1816; as a region of France, French laws apply.; Same-sex marriage has been legal since France passed a law in 2013.	Legal gender changes are allowed however there is no recognition of non-binary language or individuals.
Montserrat	Sexual acts among consenting adults of the same sex became legal in 2001 due to an order from the British Government.; Same-sex marriage illegal.	Transgender rights and protections are not recognized.
Puerto Rico	Sexual acts among consenting adults of the same sex became legal in 2003 due to a United States court ruling.; Same-sex marriage has been legal since 2015 due to a declaration made by the United States.	Legal gender changes are allowed however there is no recognition of a third gender.
Saba	Sexual acts among consenting adults of the same sex became legal in 1869 as it was legal in the Netherlands.; Same-sex marriage has been legal since 2012 with additions to the Civil Code in the Netherlands.	Gender changes on legal documents are allowed and gender-neutral documentation is available.
Saint Barthelemy	Sexual acts among consenting adults of the same sex became legal in 1816; as a region of France, French laws apply.; Same-sex marriage has been legal since France passed a law in 2013.	Legal gender changes are allowed however there is no recognition of non-binary language or individuals.
Saint Kitts and Nevis	Sexual acts among consenting adults of the same sex became legal in 2022 after a law was overturned.; Same-sex marriage is illegal.	Transgender rights and protections are not recognized.
Saint Lucia	Sexual acts among same-sex individuals became legal since 2025.; Same-sex marriage is illegal.	Transgender rights and protections are not recognized.
Saint Martin	Sexual acts among consenting adults of the same sex became legal in 1816; as a region of France, French laws apply.; Same-sex marriage has been legal since France passed a law in 2013.	Legal gender changes are allowed however there is no recognition of non-binary language or individuals.
Saint Vincent and the Grenadines	Sexual acts among same-sex individuals is illegal.; Same-sex marriage is illegal.	Transgender rights and protections are not recognized.
Sint Eustatius	Sexual acts among consenting adults of the same sex became legal in 1869 as it was legal in the Netherlands.; Same-sex marriage has been legal since 2012 with additions to the Civil Code in the Netherlands.	Gender changes on legal documents are allowed and gender-neutral documentation is available.
Sint Maarten	Sexual acts among consenting adults of the same sex became legal in 1869.; Same-sex marriage is illegal; same-sex marriages from abroad are recognized due to Netherland laws.	Transgender rights and protections are not recognized.
Trinidad and Tobago	Sexual acts among consenting adults of the same sex became legal in 2018 when a law was overturned. However, in March 2025, the Court of Appeal overturned this decision, making these acts once again illegal. This decision was appealed and then overturned once again in November 2026. The Privy council ruled unanimously to relegalise same-sex acts between individuals again.; Same-sex marriage is illegal.	Transgender rights and protections are not recognized.
Turks and Caicos Islands	Sexual acts among consenting adults of the same sex became legal in 2001 due to an order from the British Government.; Same-sex marriage illegal.	Transgender rights and protections are not recognized.
United States Virgin Islands	Sexual acts among consenting adults of the same sex became legal in 1985.; Same-sex marriage has been legal since 2015 due to a United States court ruling.	Gender changes have yet to be attempted, though it is not outlawed. Third genders are not recognized.

== Economic impact ==
A 2021 Open for Business report on LGBT+ inclusion in 12 English-speaking Caribbean countries found that LGBT+ discrimination and exclusion impose a significant economic cost on the region, estimated between US$1.5 billion and US$4.2 billion annually—or 2.1% to 5.7% of regional GDP—due to lost human capital, health disparities, reduced productivity, violence, and limitations on the tourism sector.

The report also found that LGBT+ individuals in the Caribbean face social stigma within their families, schools, and workplaces, which has contributed to high levels of migration among educated LGBT+ professionals seeking greater acceptance abroad. Additionally, the research indicates that anti-LGBT+ laws and social stigma reduce the likelihood of international tourists choosing to visit Caribbean countries, estimating that 18% of potential travelers avoid visiting the Caribbean due to concerns about LGBT+ discrimination and safety risks. This results in an annual economic loss of up to US$689 million (0.93% of regional GDP).

== See also ==
- LGBTQ rights in the Americas
