= Decriminalization of same-sex sexual practices =

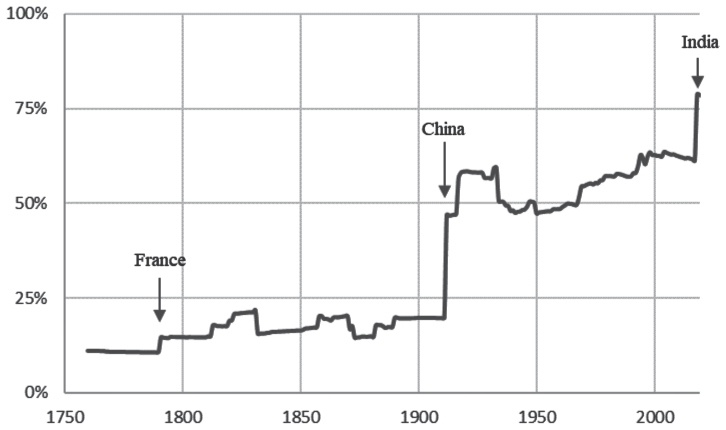
Proportion of the world population living in a country where same-sex practices are not criminalized, 1760–2020

Decriminalization of same-sex sexual practices is the repeal of laws criminalizing same-sex practices between multiple men or multiple women. It has taken place in most of the world, except much of Africa and the Muslim world.

== History ==
During the French Revolution in 1791, the National Constituent Assembly abolished the law against same-sex practices as part of adopting a new legal code without the influence of Christianity. Although the assembly never discussed homosexuality, it has been legal in France ever since. Previously it could be punished by burning to death, although this was infrequently enforced. The abolition of criminality for sodomy was codified in the 1810 penal code.

The decriminalization of same-sex practices spread across Europe by Napoleon's conquests in the Napoleonic Wars and the adoption of civil law and penal codes on the French model, leading to abolition of criminality in many jurisdictions and replacement of death with imprisonment in others. Via military occupation or emulation of the French criminal code, the Scandinavian countries, Spain, the Netherlands, Portugal, Belgium, Japan, and their colonies and territories—including much of Latin America—decriminalized homosexuality. Confirmed by the French Criminal Code of 1810 and applied in the Napoleonic empire, decriminalization then became definitive in some states that emerged from the empire (Belgium, Luxembourg, Netherlands, some Swiss cantons), but was temporary in others which recriminalized same-sex practices in part (some Italian states) or in whole (Germany, Spain) in the 19th or 20th century. It is the exception rather than the rule that civil law systems criminalized homosexuality. Former French colonies are less likely than British ones to criminalize same-sex practices, although such laws have been added in some colonies that adopted French criminal codes, including Egypt, Tunisia, and Lebanon. The Ottoman Empire is often considered to have decriminalized homosexuality in 1858, when it adopted a French-inspired criminal code, but Elif Ceylan Özsoy argues that homosexuality was already decriminalized and this change of law actually penalized same-sex practices more harshly than before, because it introduced higher penalties for public displays of same-sex affection.

Criminalized Decriminalized 1791–1850 Decriminalized 1850–1945 Decriminalized 1946–1989 Decriminalized 1990–present Unknown date of legalization Never criminalized

=== Soviet Union ===
The Soviet government of the Russian Soviet Republic (RSFSR) decriminalised homosexuality in December 1917, following the October Revolution and the discarding of the Legal Code of Tsarist Russia.

The legalisation of homosexuality was confirmed in the RSFSR Penal Code of 1922, and following its redrafting in 1926. According to Dan Healey, archival material that became widely available following the collapse of the Soviet Union in 1991 "demonstrates a principled intent to decriminalize the act between consenting adults, expressed from the earliest efforts to write a socialist criminal code in 1918 to the eventual adoption of legislation in 1922."

The Bolsheviks also rescinded Tsarist legal bans on homosexual civil and political rights, especially in the area of state employment. In 1918, Georgy Chicherin, a homosexual man who kept his homosexuality hidden, was appointed as People's Commissar for Foreign Affairs of the RSFSR. In 1923, Chicherin was also appointed People's Commissar for Foreign Affairs of the USSR, a position he held until 1930.

In the early 1920s, the Soviet government and scientific community took a great deal of interest in sexual research, sexual emancipation and homosexual emancipation. In January 1923, the Soviet Union sent delegates from the Commissariat of Health led by Commissar of Health Semashko to the German Institute for Sexual Research as well as to some international conferences on human sexuality between 1921 and 1930, where they expressed support for the legalisation of adult, private and consensual homosexual relations and the improvement of homosexual rights in all nations. In both 1923 and 1925, Dr. Grigorii Batkis, director of the Institute for Social Hygiene in Moscow, published a report, The Sexual Revolution in Russia, which stated that homosexuality was "perfectly natural" and should be legally and socially respected. In the Soviet Union itself, the 1920s saw developments in serious Soviet research on sexuality in general, sometimes in support of the progressive idea of homosexuality as a natural part of human sexuality, such as the work of Dr. Batkis prior to 1928. Such delegations and research were sent and authorised and supported by the People's Commissariat for Health under Commissar Semashko.

The legalisation of private, adult and consensual homosexual relations only applied to the Russian SSR and the Ukrainian SSR. Homosexuality remained a crime in Azerbaijan (officially criminalised in 1923), as well as in the Transcaucasian and Central Asian Soviet Republics throughout the 1920s. Similar criminal laws were enacted in Uzbekistan in 1926 and in Turkmenistan the following year.

Despite decriminalising homosexuality in 1917, Soviet social policy on the matter of wider homosexual rights and the treatment of homosexual people in the 1920s was often mixed. The Soviet courts still tried to repress sexual variation even when homosexuality was not a crime. In the late 1920s, the Soviet government’s stance towards homosexuality and homosexual rights underwent a change, and it reversed its earlier openness to same-sex sexuality by implementing laws criminalizing male homosexuality in 1934.

=== Australia ===
Until 1899, the death penalty could be applied to cases of buggery. In each jurisdiction except for Northern Territory, decriminalization followed grassroots campaigns for change.

==== South Australia ====
In 1975, South Australia was the first state to decriminalize homosexuality following the murder of University of Adelaide Law lecturer George Duncan who was thrown into the River Torrens by a group of men at a gay beat. The murder raised public awareness of harassments of homosexuals by police, and led to the establishment of gay rights organizations Campaign Against Moral Persecution (CAMP). The law was past by premier Don Dunstan and attorney-general Peter Duncan.

==== Victoria ====
The death penalty remained as the maximum penalty until 1949. The Hamer Liberal government decriminalized homosexuality in December 1980.

==== New South Wales ====
Decriminalization happened in 1984, two years after anti-discrimination laws were passed. For these two years, being gay in NSW was not a grounds for dismissal but it could lead to imprisonment.

==== Tasmania ====
In May 1997, Tasmania became the last state to decriminalize homosexuality. Until then, sex between men was punishable by more than 20 years prison.

==== Northern Territory ====
Decriminalization happened in 1983 under the Everingham Country Liberal Party Government.

=== Post-World War II decriminalization trend ===
By 1958, Interpol had noticed a trend towards the partial decriminalization of homosexuality with a higher age of consent than for heterosexual relationships. This model was recommended by various international organizations. Convergence occurred both through the partial decriminalization of homosexuality (as in the United Kingdom, and many other countries) or through the partial criminalization of homosexuality (such as in Belgium, where the law increasing the age of consent from 16 to 18 for same-sex sexual activity came into effect in 1965). Overall, there was a wave of decriminalization in the late twentieth century. Ninety percent of changes to these laws between 1945 and 2005 involved liberalization or abolition. One explanation for these legal changes is increased regard for human rights and autonomy of the individual and the effects of the 1960s sexual revolution. The trend in increased attention to individual rights in laws around sexuality has been observed around the world, but progresses more slowly in some regions, such as the Middle East.

Eighty percent of repeals between 1972 and 2002 were done by the legislature and the remainder by the laws being ruled unconstitutional by a court. The 1981 ruling in Dudgeon v. United Kingdom by the European Court of Human Rights was the first time that a court called for the decriminalization of homosexuality. Unlike earlier decriminalizations, repeal was not coincidental with the adoption of a new system of criminal law but rather by means of a specific law to repeal criminal sanctions on homosexuality, beginning with Sweden in 1944. Decriminalization, initially limited to Europe and the Americas, spread globally in the 1980s. The pace of decriminalization reached a peak in the 1990s. Following the dissolution of the Soviet Union, many former Soviet republics decriminalized homosexuality, but others in Central Asia retained these laws. China decriminalized homosexuality in 1997. Following a protracted legal battle, the Supreme Court of India ruled that the criminalization of homosexuality violated the Constitution of India in the 2018 Navtej Singh Johar v. Union of India judgement. In 2019, a plan to punish homosexuality in Brunei with a death sentence met with international outcry; as a result, there is a moratorium on the use of the death penalty. Most Caribbean countries are former British colonies and retain the criminalization of homosexuality; Belize was the first to decriminalize it after the law was ruled unconstitutional in 2016.

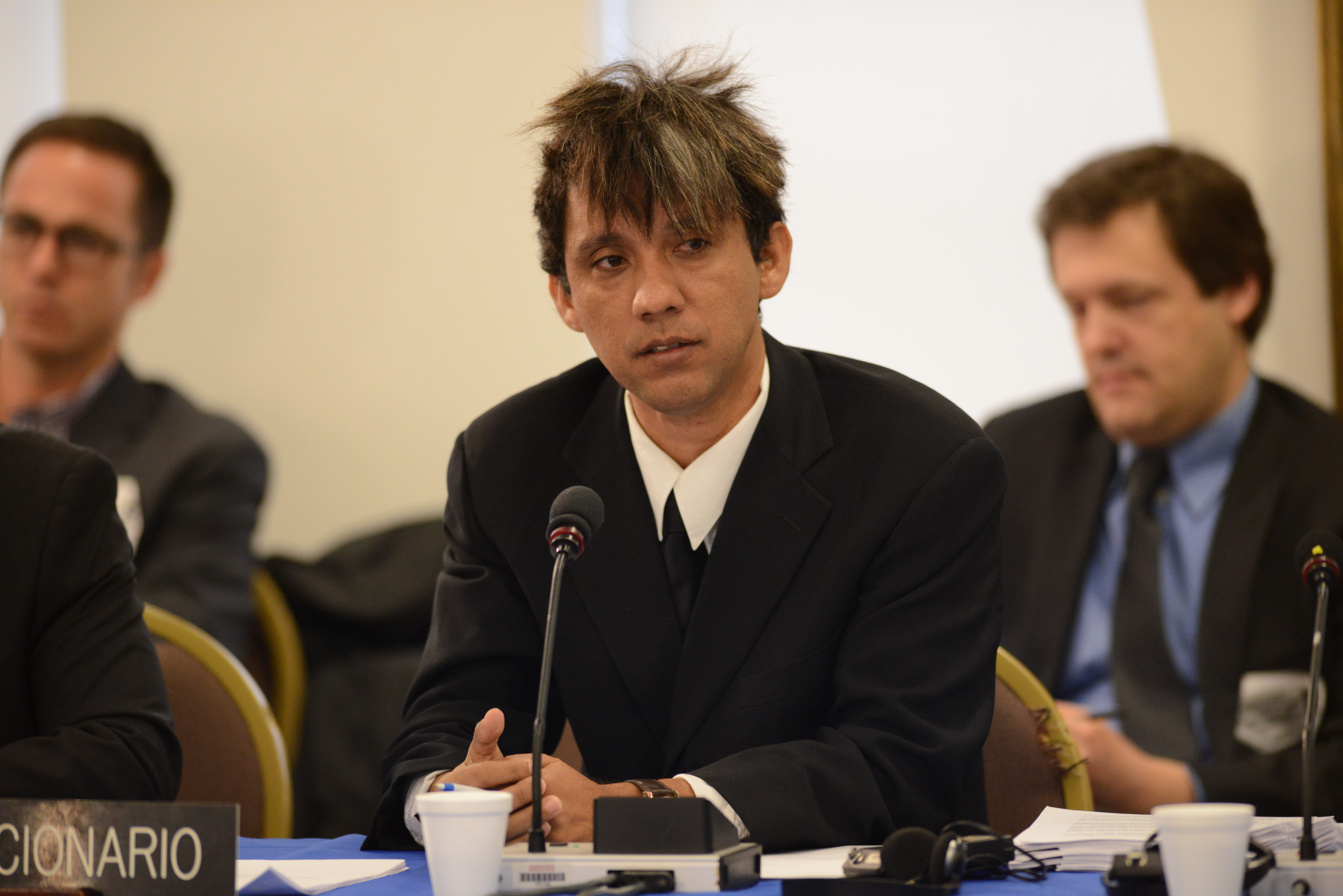
Caleb Orozco, the plaintiff in the case that led to Belize's law criminalizing homosexuality being struck down as unconstitutional

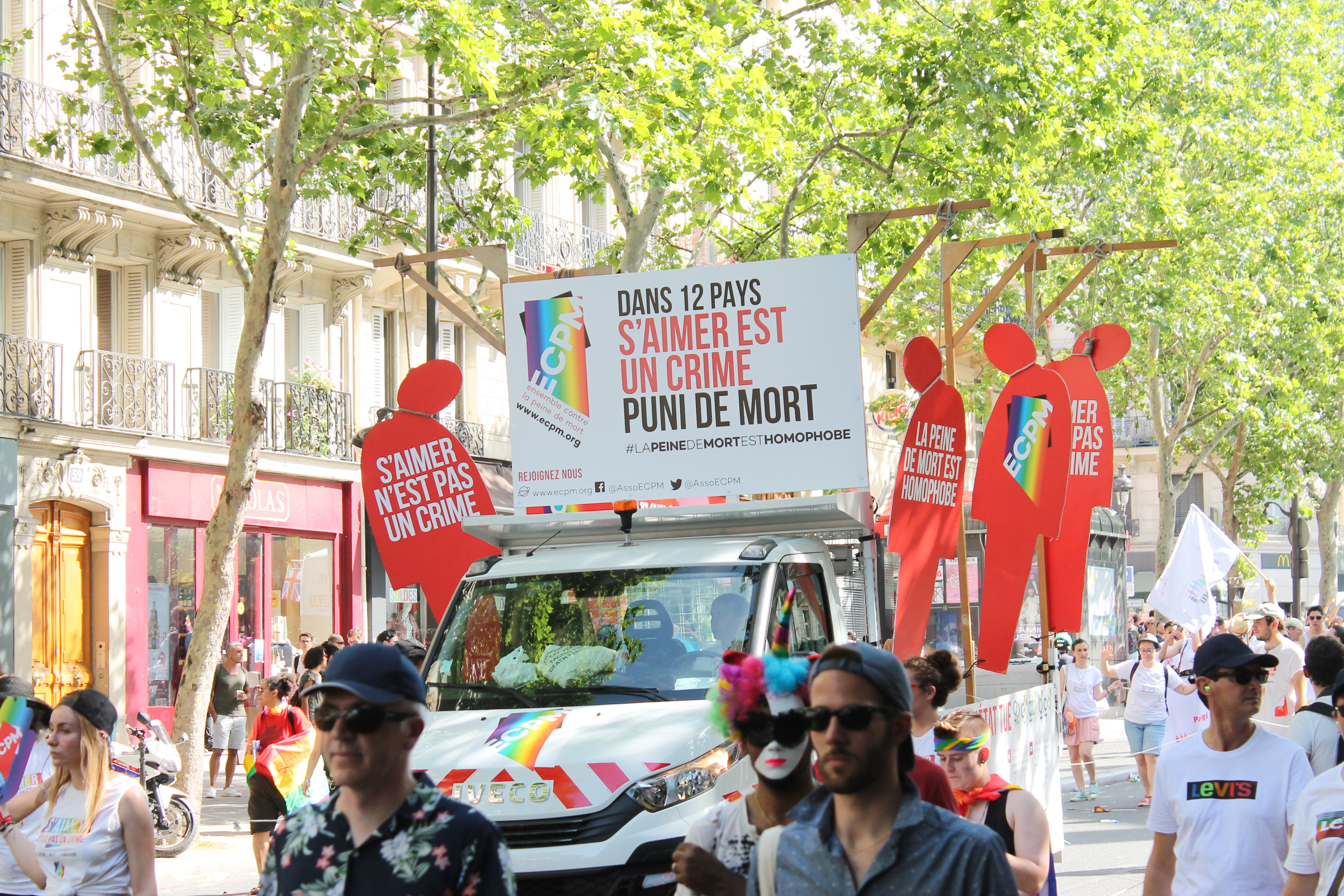
"Love is not a crime" signs at Paris Pride 2019

Studies have found that modernization, as measured by the Human Development Index or GDP per capita, and globalization (KOF Index of Globalization) was negatively correlated with having laws criminalizing homosexuality over time. LGBTQ movements often developed after the repeal of criminal laws, but in some cases they contributed to repeal efforts. LGBTQ activism against criminalization can take multiple forms, including directly advocating the repeal of the laws, strategic litigation in the judicial system in order to reduce enforceability, seeking external allies from outside the country, and capacity building within the community. Although British colonization is associated with the criminalization of homosexuality, it has no effect on the likelihood of decriminalization.

In 1981, the Council of Europe passed a resolution urging the decriminalization of homosexuality and the abolition of discriminatory age of consent laws. Following the Dudgeon case the Council of Europe made decriminalization of homosexuality a requirement for membership, which in turn was a prerequisite for membership in the European Union; several European countries decided to decriminalize homosexuality as a result. The Council of Europe admitted Lithuania in 1993 a few months before the country had repealed the criminalization of homosexuality; Romania was admitted the same year after promising to repeal its law but was still enforcing it in 1998. Russia gave up its sodomy law in 1993 in part because of an aspiration to join the Council of Europe. The last jurisdiction in Europe to decriminalize homosexuality was the self-proclaimed Turkish Republic of Northern Cyprus in 2014.

=== Resistance to decriminalization ===
Africa is the only continent where decriminalization of homosexuality has not been widespread since the mid-twentieth century. In Africa, one of the primary narratives cited in favor of the criminalization of homosexuality is "defending ordre public, morality, culture, religion, and children from the assumed imperial gay agenda" associated with the Global North; homosexuality is seen as an "un-African" foreign import. Such claims ignore the fact that many indigenous African cultures tolerated homosexuality, and historically the criminalization of homosexuality derives from British colonialism. In the Middle East, homosexuality has been seen as a tool of Western domination for the same reason.

The Obama administration's policy of supporting the decriminalization of homosexuality forced African politicians to take a public stance against LGBTQ rights in order to retain their domestic support. The application of international pressure to decriminalize homosexuality has had mixed results in Africa. While it led to liberalization in some countries, it also prompted public opinion to be skeptical of these demands and encouraging countries to pass even more restrictive laws in resistance to what is seen as neocolonial pressure. It has therefore been argued by some scholars such as Joseph Massad that the international LGBTQ movement does more harm than good in Africa or the Middle East, while some African LGBTQ organizations have urged Western countries not to leverage donor aid on LGBTQ rights issues. In 2015, African academics launched a petition calling for the decriminalization of homosexuality and criticizing several common arguments against this move. Politicians may also use homosexuality to distract from other issues.

Following decolonization, several former British colonies expanded laws that had only targeted men in order to include same-sex behavior by women. In many African countries, anti-homosexuality laws were little enforced for decades only to see increasing enforcement, politicization, and calls for harsher penalties since the mid-1990s. Such calls often come from domestic religious institutions. The rise of Evangelical Christianity and especially Pentecostalism have increased the politicization of homosexuality as these churches have been engaged in anti-homosexual mobilizations as a form of nation building. Cameroon had an anti-homosexuality law since 1962, but it was not enforced until 2005. That year both the Roman Catholic Church (especially Archbishop Simon-Victor Tonyé Bakot and Cardinal Christian Wiyghan Tumi) and the media began to make homosexuality a political issue. As of 2020, Cameroon "currently prosecutes consensual same sex conduct more aggressively than almost any country in the world". In Uganda, proposals to deepen the criminalization of homosexuality such as the so-called "Kill the Gays" bill have gained international attention. Other African countries such as South Africa, Angola, Botswana, Mozambique, and Namibia have decriminalized homosexuality.

Adherence to Islam is also a major predictor of maintaining laws criminalizing homosexuality and the death penalty for it. In some countries, criminalization of homosexuality derives from the application of sharia law. State interference in religious matters, for example religious courts having jurisdiction beyond family law or bans on interfaith marriage, is strongly correlated with maintaining the criminalization of homosexuality.

== Timeline ==
Decriminalization of same-sex sexual practices timeline
	Countries/Territories/States
Never been illegal/Never criminalized	List: Aruba, Netherlands; Benin; Cambodia; Central African Republic; Cocos (Keeling) Islands, Australia; (Republic of the Congo) Congo; (Democratic Republic of the Congo) DR Congo; Christmas Island, Australia; Curaçao, Netherlands; Djibouti; Equatorial Guinea; French Polynesia, France; Indonesia (Note: No spesific laws nationwide, except in the province of Aceh); Ivory Coast; Laos; Madagascar; Mayotte, France; (Federated States of Micronesia) Micronesia; New Caledonia, France; North Korea; Rwanda; Sint Maarten, Netherlands; South Korea; Philippines; Vietnam; Wallis and Futuna, France
18th century	List: 1791: Andorra; Kingdom of France (includes Guadeloupe, French Guiana, Martinique, Réunion, San Barthélemy, Saint Martin, and Saint Pierre and Miquelon); Saint-Domingue (Haiti); 1793: Monaco; 1794: Luxembourg; 1795: Belgium; 1798: (Canton of Geneva) Geneva, Switzerland; Ticino, Switzerland; Vaud, Switzerland; Valais, Switzerland
19th century	List: 1811: Netherlands; 1822: Dominican Republic; El Salvador; 1830: Empire of Brazil; 1832: Bolivia; 1853: Argentina; 1858: Ottoman Empire (Turkey); 1864: San Marino; 1869: Dutch Guiana (Suriname); 1871: Guatemala; Mexico; 1882: Empire of Japan; 1890: Kingdom of Italy; Vatican City; 1899: Honduras
20th century	List: 1912: (Taiwan) Republic of China; 1924: Peru; 1933: Denmark (includes Greenland and the Faroe Islands); 1932: Poland; 1934: Uruguay; 1940: Kingdom of Iceland; 1942: Switzerland (nationwide); 1944: Sweden; 1951: Greece; Jordan; West Bank, Palestine; 1956: Thailand; 1961: Hungary; 1962: (Czech Republic) (Slovakia) Czechoslovakia; Illinois, United States; 1967: England and Wales, United Kingdom; 1968: Bulgaria; East Germany; 1969: Canada; West Germany; 1971: Austria; Connecticut, United States; Costa Rica; Finland; 1972: Colorado, United States; Oregon, United States; Norway; 1973: Delaware, United States; Hawaii, United States; Malta; North Dakota, United States; 1974: Massachusetts, United States; Ohio, United States; 1975: (Timor-Leste) East Timor; New Hampshire, United States; New Mexico, United States; South Australia, Australia; 1976: Australian Capital Territory, Australia; Bahrain; California, United States; Indiana, United States; Maine, United States; (Washington (state)) Washington, United States; West Virginia, United States; 1977: Socialist Republic of Croatia; Socialist Republic of Montenegro; Socialist Republic of Slovenia; South Dakota, United States; Vermont, United States; Wyoming, United States; 1978: Guam, United States; Iowa, United States; Nebraska, United States; New Jersey, United States; 1979: Cuba; Spain; 1980: Alaska, United States; American Samoa, United States; (New York (state)) New York, United States; Pennsylvania, United States; 1981: Colombia; Scotland, United Kingdom; (Victoria (state)) Victoria, Australia; 1982: Northern Ireland, United Kingdom; 1983: Guernsey, United Kingdom; Northern Mariana Islands, United States; Northern Territory, Australia; Portugal; Wisconsin, United States; 1984: New South Wales, Australia; 1985: United States Virgin Islands, United States; 1986: New Zealand; 1988: Israel; 1989: Falkland Islands, United Kingdom; Liechtenstein; 1990: Jersey, United Kingdom; Paraguay; Western Australia, Australia; 1991: (The Bahamas) Bahamas; Abkhazia; British Hong Kong; Queensland, Australia; South Ossetia; Ukraine; 1992: Estonia; Isle of Man, United Kingdom; Kentucky, United States; Latvia; 1993: (Washington, D.C.) District of Columbia, United States; Gibraltar, United Kingdom; Guinea-Bissau; (Republic of Ireland) Ireland; Lithuania; Mongolia; Nevada, United States; Norfolk Island, Australia; Russia (Note: De facto illegal in Chechnya); 1994: Autonomous Province of Kosovo and Metohija; Belarus; Bermuda, United Kingdom; Republic of Serbia; 1995: Albania; Moldova; 1996: Federation of Bosnia and Herzegovina, Bosnia and Herzegovina; Portuguese Macau; North Macedonia; Romania; Tennessee, United States; 1997: China; Ecuador; Montana, United States; Tasmania, Australia; Venezuela; 1998: Cyprus; (Georgia (U.S. state)) Georgia, United States; Kazakhstan; Kyrgyzstan; Republika Srpska, Bosnia and Herzegovina; Rhode Island, United States; South Africa; Tajikistan; 1999: Chile; Maryland, United States; 2000: Akrotiri and Dhekelia, United Kingdom; Azerbaijan; (Georgia (country)) Georgia
21st century	List: 2001: Anguilla, United Kingdom; Arizona, United States; Brčko District, Bosnia and Herzegovina; British Virgin Islands, United Kingdom; Cayman Islands, United Kingdom; Minnesota, United States; Montserrat, United Kingdom; (Ascension Island) Saint Helena, Ascension and Tristan da Cunha, United Kingdom; Pitcairn Islands, United Kingdom; Turks and Caicos Islands, United Kingdom; 2002: Arkansas, United States; Transnistria; 2003: Armenia; Tokelau, New Zealand; United States (nationwide); 2004: Cape Verde; 2005: Marshall Islands; 2007: Nepal; Vanuatu; 2008: Nicaragua; Panama; 2010: Fiji; 2012: Lesotho; São Tomé and Príncipe; 2014: Northern Cyprus; Palau; 2015: Mozambique; 2016: Belize; Nauru; Seychelles; 2018: India; 2019: Botswana; 2020: Gabon; 2021: Angola; Bhutan; 2022: Antigua and Barbuda; Barbados; Singapore; Saint Kitts and Nevis; 2023: Cook Islands, New Zealand; Mauritius; 2024: Dominica; Namibia; Niue, New Zealand; 2025: Saint Lucia; 2026: Trinidad and Tobago
	Notes: Note that while this template lists several historical countries, such as the Kingdom of France, Czechoslovakia, East Germany, etc., for the sake of clarity, the flags shown are contemporary flags.; When a country has decriminalized, re-criminalized, and decriminalized again (e.g. Albania, Bulgaria, Spain, republics of the Soviet Union) only the later decriminalization date is included. Countries which have decriminalized and since re-criminalized (e.g. Iraq) are excluded.

== See also ==
- Alan Turing law
- LGBTQ rights by country or territory
- Criminalization of homosexuality

== Sources ==
- Alexander, Rustam (2018). "Soviet Legal and Criminological Debates on the Decriminalization of Homosexuality (1965–75)". Slavic Review. 77 (1): 30–52. doi:10.1017/slr.2018.9. ISSN 0037-6779.
- Anabtawi, Samer (2022). "Snatching Legal Victory: LGBTQ Rights Activism and Contestation in the Arab World". Arab Law Quarterly. 36 (4–5): 383–421. doi:10.1163/15730255-bja10112. ISSN 1573-0255.
- Asal, Victor; Sommer, Udi (2016). Legal Path Dependence and the Long Arm of the Religious State: Sodomy Provisions and Gay Rights across Nations and over Time. SUNY Press. ISBN 978-1-4384-6325-4.
- Arimoro, Augustine Edobor (2021). "Interrogating the Criminalisation of Same-Sex Sexual Activity: A Study of Commonwealth Africa". Liverpool Law Review. 42 (3): 379–399. doi:10.1007/s10991-021-09280-5. ISSN 1572-8625.
- Awondo, Patrick (2016). "Religious Leadership and the Re-Politicisation of Gender and Sexuality in Cameroon". Journal of Theology for Southern Africa.
- Dupont, Wannes (2019). "Pas de deux, out of step: Diverging chronologies of homosexuality's (de)criminalisation in the Low Countries". Tijdschrift voor Genderstudies. 22 (4): 321–338. doi:10.5117/TVGN2019.4.001.DUPO.
- Gloppen, Siri; Rakner, Lise (2020). "LGBT rights in Africa". Research Handbook on Gender, Sexuality and the Law. ISBN 9781788111157.
- Han, Enze; O'Mahoney, Joseph (2018). British Colonialism and the Criminalization of Homosexuality: Queens, Crime and Empire. Routledge. ISBN 978-1-351-25618-6.
- Hildebrandt, Achim (2014). "Routes to decriminalization: A comparative analysis of the legalization of same-sex sexual acts". Sexualities. 17 (1–2): 230–253. doi:10.1177/1363460713511105.
- Hildebrandt, Achim; Trüdinger, Eva-Maria; Wyss, Dominik (2019). "The Missing Link? Modernization, Tolerance, and Legislation on Homosexuality". Political Research Quarterly. 72 (3): 539–553. doi:10.1177/1065912918797464.
- Human Dignity Trust (May 2016). "Breaking the Silence: Criminalisation of Lesbians and Bisexual Women and its Impacts" (PDF). Archived (PDF) from the original on 2019-06-03.
- Kane, Melinda D. (2015). "Decriminalizing Homosexuality: Gaining Rights through Sodomy Law Reform". The Ashgate Research Companion to Lesbian and Gay Activism. Routledge. ISBN 978-1-315-61314-7.
- Kaoma, Kapya (2018). Christianity, Globalization, and Protective Homophobia: Democratic Contestation of Sexuality in Sub-Saharan Africa. Springer International Publishing. ISBN 978-3-319-66341-8.
- Karimi, Ahmad; Bayatrizi, Zohreh (2019). "Dangerous positions: Male homosexuality in the new penal code of Iran". Punishment & Society. 21 (4): 417–434. doi:10.1177/1462474518787465.
- Mignot, Jean-François (2022). "Decriminalizing homosexuality: A global overview since the 18th century". Annales de démographie historique (143): 115–133. doi:10.3917/adh.143.0115. ISSN 0066-2062.
- Nordling, Linda (2015). "African academics challenge homophobic laws". Nature. 522 (7555): 135–136. Bibcode:2015Natur.522..135N. doi:10.1038/522135a. ISSN 1476-4687. PMID 26062487. S2CID 4470101.
- Ozsoy, Elif Ceylan (2021). "Decolonizing Decriminalization Analyses: Did the Ottomans Decriminalize Homosexuality in 1858?". Journal of Homosexuality. 68 (12): 1979–2002. doi:10.1080/00918369.2020.1715142. hdl:10871/120331. PMID 32069182.
- Rich, Timothy; Dahmer, Andi; Eliassen, Isabel (2020). "Historical Views of Homosexuality: Asia". The Oxford Encyclopedia of LGBT Politics and Policy. Oxford University Press.
- Seckinelgin, Hakan (2018). "Same-sex lives between the language of international LGBT rights, international aid, and anti-homosexuality". Global Social Policy. 18 (3): 284–303. doi:10.1177/1468018118795989.
- Sibalis, Michael David (1996). "The Regulation of Male Homosexuality in Revolutionary and Napoleonic France, 1789–1815". Homosexuality in Modern France. Oxford University Press. ISBN 978-0-19-509303-2.
- Tobin, Robert Deam (2015). Peripheral Desires: The German Discovery of Sex. University of Pennsylvania Press. ISBN 978-0-8122-4742-8.
- Tolino, Serena (2020). "LGBTQI Rights in the Middle East and North Africa". The Oxford Handbook of the Sociology of the Middle East. Oxford University Press. ISBN 978-0-19-008748-7.
- Torra, Michael Jose (1998). "Gay Rights After the Iron Curtain". The Fletcher Forum of World Affairs. 22 (2): 73–88. ISSN 1046-1868. JSTOR 45289040.
- Whisnant, Clayton J. (2016). Queer Identities and Politics in Germany: A History, 1880–1945. Columbia University Press. ISBN 978-1-939594-10-5.
- Wirtz, Andrea L.; Kirey, Anna; Peryskina, Alena; Houdart, Fabrice; Beyrer, Chris (2013). "Uncovering the epidemic of HIV among men who have sex with men in Central Asia". Drug and Alcohol Dependence. 132: S17–S24. doi:10.1016/j.drugalcdep.2013.06.031. PMID 23906993.
