= LGBTQ rights in the Commonwealth of Nations =

Current members of the Commonwealth of Nations.

Most countries in the Commonwealth of Nations still criminalise sexual acts between consenting adults of the same sex and other forms of sexual orientation, gender identity and expression. Homosexual activity remains a criminal offence in 28 (Note: Homosexuality is a criminal offence in the following Commonwealth member states (those with an asterisk* do not enforce the law): Cameroon, Eswatini,* Ghana, Kenya, Malawi,* Nigeria, Sierra Leone,* Tanzania, The Gambia, Togo, Uganda, Zambia, Bangladesh, Brunei, Malaysia, Maldives, Pakistan, Grenada,* Guyana,* Sri Lanka,* Jamaica,* Saint Lucia,* Saint Vincent and the Grenadines,* Kiribati,* Solomon Islands*, Papua New Guinea,* Samoa,* Tonga,* and Tuvalu.*) of the 56 sovereign states of the Commonwealth, and legal in 28.

This has been described as being the result of "the major historical influence" or legacy of the British Empire. In most cases, it was former colonial administrators that established anti-gay legislation or sodomy acts during the 19th century and even earlier. Most countries have retained these laws following independence. Due to the common origin of historical penal codes in many former British colonies, the prohibition of homosexual acts, specifically anal sex between men, is provided for in Section 377 in the penal codes of 42 former British colonies, many of whom are today members of the Commonwealth.

The penalties for private, consensual sexual conduct between same sex adults remain harsh in a number of Commonwealth countries. They include 10 years' imprisonment and hard labour in Jamaica, 14 years in Kenya, and 20 years plus flogging in Malaysia. A cluster of member states have a maximum sentence of life imprisonment: Bangladesh, Guyana, Pakistan, Sierra Leone, Tanzania and Uganda. Meanwhile, Brunei and Northern Nigeria (Note: Nigeria is a multinational federation of 36 states, the northern 12 of which have instituted legal systems based on Sharia for civil and criminal offences.) have a maximum penalty for male homosexuality of death. In some countries such as Cameroon, arrests and imprisonment for acts that indicate homosexuality are frequently reported. In Uganda and Nigeria, recent legislative proposals would significantly increase the penalties for homosexuality.

== Overview ==
Homosexual activity remains a criminal offence in 29 (see below) of the 56 sovereign states of the Commonwealth and legal in 27 (see below).

However, developments in the area of employment discrimination suggests some progress is being made, with member states such as the Seychelles (2006), Fiji (2007), Mozambique (2007), Mauritius (2008) and Botswana (2010) introducing legislation against employment discrimination based on sexual orientation. In November 2012, Malawi's President Joyce Banda suspended all laws that criminalised homosexuality.

A report produced in November 2015 by the Human Dignity Trust in association with the Commonwealth Lawyers' Association claims that countries that continue to criminalize same-sex relationships were worsening the impacts of the HIV/AIDS crisis. The report estimates that some 2.9 billion people live in Commonwealth countries where consensual homosexuality is punishable, and approximately 174 million living there may identify as LGBT. It found that:

There is a direct link between criminalizing laws and increased rates of HIV, and the Commonwealth undeniably demonstrates this link. The Commonwealth accounts for approximately 30% of the world's population but over 60% of HIV cases worldwide. This situation has gotten progressively worse.

— Human Dignity Trust

== Discussions at Commonwealth level ==
=== Interventions by Secretaries-General ===
In July 2011 it was reported that the Commonwealth Secretary General, Kamalesh Sharma, had spoken out against discrimination towards people who were gay or lesbian while on a visit to Australia, arguing that “vilification and targeting on grounds of sexual orientation are at odds with the values of the Commonwealth”. This was the first time that such a senior Commonwealth figure had spoken publicly on the issue. Sharma re-emphasised the point in his keynote speech at the opening ceremony of the Commonwealth Heads of Government meeting:

We recall the 2009 Affirmation of Commonwealth Values and Principles, which includes a clear commitment to tolerance, respect and understanding... Discrimination and criminalisation on grounds of sexual orientation is at odds with our values and I have had occasion to refer to this in the context of our law-related conferences.

— Kamalesh Sharma, Commonwealth Secretary-General

Commonwealth Secretary-General Baroness Patricia Scotland, who took office on 1 April 2016, committed herself to using the first two years of her tenure to promote decriminalization of homosexuality in the Commonwealth countries that list homosexual behaviour as a crime. However, she has suggested that the way forward needs to be built through establishing consensus:

We do not have the right or opportunity to force states, but we can start a really good conversation to work with them so they understand the economic issues in relations to human rights and make the change.

— Patricia Scotland, Commonwealth Secretary-General

=== Perth Commonwealth Conference ===
The British human rights campaigner Peter Tatchell and the South Australian Labor MLC Ian Hunter called for LGBT rights to be put on the agenda of the Commonwealth Heads of Government Meeting (CHOGM) to be held in Perth at the end of October 2011.

CHOGM has never even discussed—let alone declared its support for—LGBT equality and human rights. It is long overdue that CHOGM addressed this humanitarian issue, which it has neglected for far too long.

— Peter Tatchell and Ian Hunter

This found further support when the Perth Member of the Legislative Assembly, John Hyde, called on Premier Colin Barnett to use his access to CHOGM delegates to address the issue of human rights for gay men and lesbians. Finally, it was confirmed that the Australian Foreign Minister, Kevin Rudd, would intervene at the October meeting with a request to scrap anti-LGBT laws. The discussion on LGBT rights at the Perth meeting received a muted response from most of the attending delegates despite strong support from the UK, Canada, Australia, and New Zealand. Agreement could not be reached to publish a report by Eminent Persons which looked at the Commonwealth's future relevance and demanded that all member states that outlawed homosexuality lift their bans.

=== Malta Conference ===
In November 2015, Baroness Verma, Under-Secretary of State at the UK's Department for International Development, announced that she would be chairing a round table on LGBT issues at the Commonwealth Heads of Government meeting in Malta.

Subsequently, in 2016 the Prime Minister of Malta, Joseph Muscat, urged Commonwealth countries to remove anti-LGBT laws while speaking at the Service of Celebration for Commonwealth Day at Westminster Abbey. Queen Elizabeth, Head of the Commonwealth, was present.

In June 2017, the Commonwealth approved the accreditation of the Commonwealth Equality Network (TCEN), making it the first LGBTI-focussed organisation to be officially accredited. Accreditation means that Equality Network activists will benefit from increased access to, participation in and information about Commonwealth matters.

=== United Kingdom ===
The British Prime Minister, David Cameron, indicated his support:

It's simply appalling how people can be treated—how their rights are trampled on and the prejudices and even the violence they suffer. I want Britain to be a global beacon for reform.

The Minister for International Development, Andrew Mitchell, subsequently indicated that the UK would withhold development aid from countries that had a poor human rights record in relation to its LGBT citizens. Malawi subsequently had £19 million of budget support suspended by the UK following various infractions including poor progress on human rights and media freedoms and concern over the government's approach to rights of its LGBT citizens. This was later reinforced by David Cameron, who emphasised that those receiving UK aid should "adhere to proper human rights". After the Government of Seychelles agreed to push forward with plans to repeal the country's anti-gay law, they specifically noted advocacy from British diplomats.

In 2014, the British Foreign Secretary, William Hague, wrote to the Commonwealth Secretary-General urging him to use his position to urge member states to live up to their responsibilities to promote the rights of their LGBT citizens. He later argued that Britain should make defending the rights of gay and lesbian people a key plank of its relations with other Commonwealth countries.

In April 2018, Britain hosted the Heads of Government meeting in London. The British Prime Minister, Theresa May, said she regretted that many of the current laws across Commonwealth countries that criminalised homosexuality were a direct legacy of British colonialism; and offered to support any government that wanted to reform its legislation. More than 100,000 people had signed a petition calling for the issue of LGBT rights to be raised at the meeting.

== Commonwealth LGBT advocacy organisations ==
=== Kaleidoscope Trust ===
The Kaleidoscope Trust was established in London in 2011 to lobby Britain's politicians so that ministers discuss LGBT (Lesbian, Gay, Bisexual and Transgender) issues whenever they host their counterparts. It specifically aims to revoke anti-LGBT laws within the Commonwealth using business and political pressure. The singers Elton John and George Michael offered support, with Elton John attending the launch.

== Commonwealth nations where homosexuality is not a criminal offence ==
Worldwide laws regarding same-sex intercourse, unions and expression. Same-sex intercourse legal. Recognition of unions: Marriage / Extraterritorial marriage^{2}; Civil unions / Limited domestic; Limited foreign / Optional certification; Same-sex intercourse illegal. Penalties: Death / Prison; death not enforced; Death under militias / Prison, with arrests or detention; Prison, not enforced^{1}; Same-sex intercourse Restricted/Ambiguous. Depends are: No data / Restriction of expression, not enforced; Restriction of association with arrests or detention^{1}No imprisonment in the past three years or moratorium on law.^{2}Marriage not available locally. Some jurisdictions may perform other types of partnerships.

LGBTQI+ rights at the United Nations: Neither / States which did not support either declaration; Non-member states / States that are not voting members of the United Nations; Oppose / States which supported an opposing declaration in 2008 and continued their opposition in 2011; Subsequent member / South Sudan, did not exist in 2008; Support / States which supported the LGBTQ rights declaration in the General Assembly or on the Human Rights Council in 2008 or 2011

=== Where same-sex marriage is legal ===
==== Europe ====
- United Kingdom^{†} (UK)
- (United Kingdom) Akrotiri and Dhekelia^{†} (UK)
- (United Kingdom) Gibraltar^{†} (UK)
- (United Kingdom) Guernsey, Alderney and Sark^{†} (UK)
- (United Kingdom) Isle of Man^{†} (UK)
- (United Kingdom) Jersey^{†} (UK)
- Malta^{†}

==== Asia ====
- (United Kingdom) British Indian Ocean Territory^{†} (UK)

==== Africa ====
- South Africa^{†}
- (United Kingdom) Saint Helena, Ascension Island & Tristan da Cunha^{†} (UK)

==== Americas ====
- (United Kingdom) Falkland Islands^{†} (UK)
- (United Kingdom) South Georgia and the South Sandwich Islands^{†} (UK)
- Canada^{†}

==== Oceania ====
- Australia^{†}
- (United Kingdom) Pitcairn Islands^{†} (UK)
- New Zealand^{†}
- (United Kingdom) British Antarctic Territory^{†} (UK)

=== Where same sex-relationships are recognised ===
All the above and:

==== Europe ====
- Cyprus^{†}

==== Americas ====
- (United Kingdom) Bermuda^{†} (UK)
- (United Kingdom) Cayman Islands^{†} (UK)

=== With discrimination protections ===
==== Africa ====
- Botswana
- Mauritius^{†}
- Mozambique (Employment only)
- Seychelles^{†} (Employment only)

==== Asia ====
- India
- Singapore (Only protections from incitement of religiously motivated anti-LGBT harassment and violence)

==== Americas ====
- Antigua and Barbuda
- Barbados (Employment, sexual orientation only)
- (United Kingdom) British Virgin Islands^{†} (UK)
- (United Kingdom) Montserrat^{†} (UK)
- (United Kingdom) Turks and Caicos Islands^{†} (UK)
- Belize
- Saint Lucia^{‡}

==== Oceania ====
- Fiji^{†} (Employment only)
- (New Zealand) Cook Islands (NZ)^{†}

=== Same-sex activity legal, no discrimination protection ===
==== Africa ====
- Gabon^{†}
- Lesotho
- Namibia
- Rwanda^{†}

==== Americas ====
- (United Kingdom) Anguilla (UK)^{†}
- (The Bahamas) Bahamas^{†}
- Dominica^{†}
- Saint Kitts and Nevis
- Trinidad and Tobago

==== Oceania ====
- Nauru^{†}
- (New Zealand) Niue (NZ)^{†}
- (New Zealand) Tokelau (NZ)^{†}
- Vanuatu^{†}

Notes: ^{†}Signed UN General Assembly declaration in favour of LGBT rights. ^{‡}Signed alternative statement against LGBT rights.

== Commonwealth nations where homosexuality is a criminal offence ==
=== Not enforced and with discrimination protections ===
==== Asia ====
- Sri Lanka

==== Oceania ====
- Samoa^{†} (Employment only)

=== Not enforced ===
==== Africa ====
- Malawi^{‡}
- Sierra Leone
- Eswatini ^{†}

==== Americas ====
- Jamaica
- Grenada
- Guyana
- Saint Vincent and the Grenadines

==== Oceania ====
- Kiribati
- Tonga
- Tuvalu
- Papua New Guinea
- Solomon Islands^{†}

=== Punished by imprisonment ===
==== Africa ====
- Cameroon^{‡}
- (The Gambia) Gambia
- Ghana
- Kenya^{‡}
- Southern Nigeria^{‡}
- Tanzania^{‡}
- Togo^{‡}
- Uganda^{‡}
- Zambia

==== Asia ====
- Bangladesh^{‡}
- Malaysia^{‡}
- Maldives
- Pakistan^{‡}

=== Death penalty ===
==== Asia ====
- Brunei‡ (Not enforced)

==== Africa ====
- Northern Nigeria (States under Sharia law.)^{‡}
- Uganda^{‡} (Introduced 2023 for "aggravated homosexuality".)

Notes: ^{†}Signed UN General Assembly declaration in favour of LGBT rights. ^{‡}Signed alternative Statement against LGBT rights.

== See also ==
- Buggery Act
- LGBTQ rights by country or territory
- LGBTQ rights in La Francophonie
