= LGBTQ rights in the Cayman Islands =

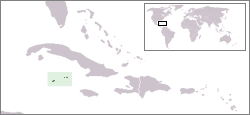
- Cayman Islands
- Legal status: Legal since 2001; unequal age of consent
- Gender identity: No
- Military: Allowed to serve openly in the British Armed Forces
- Discrimination protections: No

Family rights
- Recognition of relationships: Civil Partnerships since 2020
- Adoption: Yes

LGBTQ+ rights in the Cayman Islands are regarded as some of the most complex in the Caribbean. The British Overseas Territory continues to relax its stance and improve its laws on this subject. Both male and female types of same-sex sexual activity are legal in the Cayman Islands. Same-sex unions became legal in 2020. Public opinion has changed significantly since the early 2010s, with social cohesion improving, attributable to the more liberal stances of younger Caymanians and LGBTQ-friendly influences from the islands’ large immigrant population.

A former Premier of the Cayman Islands, Wayne Panton, voiced his support for LGBTQ+ individuals shortly after being elected to Parliament, and, along with other members of Parliament, participated in the Cayman Islands’ first gay pride parade in July 2021. His staunch support of the community has been praised by many in the Caymanian public, who in the past have criticised the government for their unprofessional and often ill-mannered attitude towards this community.

On 29 March 2019, the Chief Justice of the Cayman Islands issued a ruling declaring the territory's same-sex marriage ban unconstitutional. However, the ruling was stayed and then overturned by the Court of Appeal on 7 November 2019. The Court of Appeal called on the Cayman Government to implement civil unions or a legal equivalent, and ordered the Government of the United Kingdom to step in if the Cayman Government failed to do so. A civil partnership law was enacted on 4 September 2020. In March 2022, a London court in the UK upheld the legal ban on same-sex marriage.

== Legality of same-sex sexual activity ==
Same-sex sexual acts were expressly decriminalised under Britain's Caribbean Territories (Criminal Law) Order, 2000, which took effect on 1 January 2001.

Britain's International Covenant on Civil and Political Rights report on its Overseas Territories on Bermuda, the Cayman Islands, the Falkland Islands, Gibraltar, Montserrat, the Pitcairn Islands, Saint Helena and the Turks and Caicos Islands stated in 1999 stated that "The United Kingdom Government is concerned that all Overseas Territories should adopt – as most of them, indeed, already do – substantially the same position as obtains in the United Kingdom itself in respect of capital punishment, judicial corporal punishment and the treatment as criminal offences of homosexual acts between consenting adults in private".

The repeal of the anti-gay law was condemned by conservative groups and politicians, several of whom made conspiracy theories of a supposed "secret gay lobby trying to destroy Cayman values and Christianity".

The age of consent is higher for homosexuals (18) than it is for heterosexuals (16).

== Recognition of same-sex couples ==
The Marriage Law of the Cayman Islands defines marriage as between one man and one woman. The Constitution of the Cayman Islands notes the right of opposite-sex couples to marry, though it does not explicitly mention same-sex unions.

Since then, incremental reforms have been made to recognise some rights for same-sex couples. In July 2016, the Immigration Appeals Tribunal ruled in favour of a gay man who sought to be added to his spouse's work permit as a dependent. Later that year, the Legislative Assembly voted against a motion to hold a referendum on the legalisation of same-sex marriage. A lawsuit brought by a dual Caymanian-British same-sex couple, Chantelle Day and Vickie Bodden, challenging the ban on same-sex marriage, was lodged in the Grand Court in June 2018. Oral arguments were heard in the case in February 2019, with a decision by Chief Justice Anthony Smellie in favour of recognising same-sex marriage published on 29 March 2019.

However, the decision was later reversed by the Cayman Islands Court of Appeal. The appellant's arguments were heard in court for three days, starting on 28 August 2019. The Court sided with the government and on 7 November 2019 it overturned the Chief Justice's previous judgment. It called on the Government of the Cayman Islands to introduce civil partnerships and called on the UK Government to step in if the Cayman Government failed to do so. The petitioning couple filed an appeal to the UK-based Privy Council, with oral arguments set for 23 February 2021. In March 2022, a London court in the UK upheld the legal ban on same-sex marriage.

On 26 June 2020, the Cayman Government introduced a domestic partnership bill to the Legislative Assembly. The bill failed on a 8–9 vote, and consequently, as required by the ruling of the Court of Appeal, Her Majesty's Government intervened. On 4 September 2020, Governor Martyn Roper assented to the Civil Partnership Law, 2020 and 11 consequential pieces of legislation which came into effect on the same day. Under the changes, civil partners are allowed to share health insurance, immigrate together and enjoy other rights extended to married couples. Civil partnerships are open to both same-sex and opposite-sex couples. This was challenged in the privy council, the final court of appeal for the British overseas territory and in 2025, the court upheld the law.

== Discrimination protections ==
In 2009, a draft constitution excluded LGBT rights. The British Foreign Affairs Committee described the decision to exclude sexual orientation as a prohibited ground for discrimination as "deplorable" and raised concerns that it breached human rights laws. It raised the possibility that Cayman residents could be afforded less than the full protection to which they are entitled, under the European Convention on Human Rights.

== Military service ==
Lesbian, gay, bisexual and transgender people have been allowed to serve openly in the British Armed Forces since 2000. However, legalization of homosexuality didn't occur until 2001, so it was fully allowed since 2001.

== Living conditions ==
LGBT citizens and same-sex couples for the most part, receive the same treatment in certain factors of life. Banking and insurance is equal, and immigration rights for same-sex couples have expanded over the years. It is heavily frowned upon for a business to discriminate against LGBT individuals, so it is not common. LGBT acceptance among young Caymanians is evident, with some educational institutions like Cayman International School, having LGBT youth clubs.

Although civil partnerships are legal, the fight for same-sex marriage legality is ongoing.

Open displays of affection between same-sex partners may offend in conservative areas. The sister islands of Cayman Brac and Little Cayman are still deeply conservative, so caution is advised. Grand Cayman, with its large immigrant population from more LGBT-friendly nations such as the United States and the United Kingdom, has introduced more liberal views to the island, though it is still advised to take caution. Tourism hubs will be more accepting as it is crucial that visitors of all backgrounds are catered to. It is uncommon for same-sex couples to be verbally or physically attacked. Some couples may receive curious stares. Older Caymanians tend to be more conservative when dealing with issues such as LGBT rights, while the arrival of immigrants from LGBT-friendly nations, and a rejection of strict Christianity by many young Caymanians has influenced the attitude among the younger generation, who today, seem much more liberal.

The gay scene in the Cayman Islands is limited, with no specific gay nightclubs or beaches, however some venues will host pride events during pride month to show their support. All restaurants, bars and hotels cater to LGBT clientele. The Seven Mile Beach strip would be the center of the island's gay scene, with it being the location of the Cayman Islands’ annual pride parade.

=== Homophobia ===
While the Cayman Islands is officially secular and the Constitution guarantees equality and non-discrimination, the government has been particularly vocal and unapologetic in expressing its anti-gay attitudes. In 1998, it forbade a Norwegian Cruise Line ship carrying over 900 gay travellers from porting. The Tourism Ministry stated: "We cannot count on this group to uphold the standards of appropriate behaviour expected of visitors to the Cayman Islands." The ban drew criticism from human rights groups and travel agencies, some of which advised a boycott of the islands. In 2008, police arrested a Massachusetts gay man after he kissed his partner on a nightclub dancefloor. He was later released. Since the late 2010s, support of the LGBT community has increased and public attitudes have changed dramatically.

== Summary table ==
Same-sex sexual activity legal	Yes (Since 2001)
Equal age of consent	No (Pending)
Anti-discrimination laws in employment	No
Anti-discrimination laws in the provision of goods and services	No
Anti-discrimination laws in all other areas (incl. indirect discrimination, hate speech)	No
Same-sex marriages	No
Recognition of same-sex couples (e.g. recognised as civil partnerships)	Yes (Since 2020)
Stepchild adoption by same-sex couples	Yes
Joint adoption by same-sex couples	Yes
LGBT people allowed to serve openly in the military	Yes (Since 2001; is the responsibility of the United Kingdom and was allowed by the UK since 2000 but wasn't in full effect until homosexuality was removed as a crime in 2001)
Right to change legal gender	No
Conversion therapy banned	No
Access to IVF for lesbian couples	No
Commercial surrogacy for gay male couples	No (Banned for heterosexual couples as well)
MSMs allowed to donate blood	No

== See also ==
- Politics of the Cayman Islands
- LGBTQ rights in the Commonwealth of Nations
- LGBTQ rights in the Americas
- LGBTQ rights by country or territory
- Same-sex marriage in the Cayman Islands
