= Constitution of the Cayman Islands =

The current Constitution of the Cayman Islands, the fourth written constitution for the Cayman Islands since 1959, was established by "The Cayman Islands Constitution Order 2009" of 10 June 2009, and came into force on 4 November 2009, by a proclamation published by the governor of the Cayman Islands. It was amended by "The Cayman Islands Constitution (Amendment) Order 2016" of 13 July 2016, which came into force by a similar proclamation.

== History ==
Prior to 1959, the Cayman Islands were administered as a dependency of the Colony of Jamaica. In 1959, an Order-in-Council was made to split the Cayman Islands off as a separate Crown Colony with their own constitution. It also replaced the Assembly of Justices and Vestry with a new Legislative Assembly of the Cayman Islands elected under universal suffrage. Due to Jamaican independence in 1962, it was no longer deemed suitable for the Governor of Jamaica to act concurrently as Administrator of the Cayman Islands. A new constitution was instituted in 1962 to sever all remaining links with Jamaica and create the position of Governor of the Cayman Islands as the Monarch's representative in the colony.

In 1965, it was discovered that the British government had forgotten to lay the 1962 constitution before Parliament. As a result, a new constitution was created in 1965 to correct that error. In 1972, another constitution was enacted to introduce ministerial government to the Cayman Islands. This constitution remained until 2009 when Cayman Islanders voted in the 2009 Caymanian constitutional referendum to adopt a new constitution.
