= LGBTQ rights in Grenada =

- Grenada
- Legal status: Illegal
- Penalty: Up to 10 years imprisonment (not enforced, repeal pending)
- Gender identity: No
- Military: Has no military
- Discrimination protections: None

Family rights
- Recognition of relationships: No recognition of same-sex relationships
- Adoption: No

Lesbian, gay, bisexual, transgender, and queer (LGBTQ) people in Grenada face social and legal challenges not experienced by non-LGBTQ residents. The penal code makes male same-sex acts in Grenada illegal with a punishment of up to 10 years in prison; it also does not address discrimination or harassment on the basis of sexual orientation or gender identity, nor does it recognize same sex unions in any form, whether it be marriage or partnerships. Households headed by same-sex couples are also not eligible for any of the same rights given to opposite-sex married couples.

== Legality of same-sex sexual acts ==
Recognition of same-sex unions in the Lesser Antilles and Puerto Rico Same-sex marriage Unregistered cohabitation Island subject to IACHR advisory opinion No recognition of same-sex couples Constitutional ban on same-sex marriage Same-sex sexual activity illegal but penalties not enforced

Homosexuality is illegal in Grenada proper. Under the Grenada Criminal Code, Section 431, the offence of “unnatural crime” is committed by way of sexual intercourse per anum, i.e., anal penetration. Such an offence is punishable by imprisonment for ten years.

The Criminal Code does not specify the ‘penetrating’ object, although by reliance on the common law, the penetrating object is the penis. The offence is committable by male person with/to male person and/or male person with/to female. The offence cannot, however, be committed by two female persons. However, in section 7, the criminal law prohibits "Committing grossly indecent act; is stated in gender-neutral terms. By implication it covers both opposite-sex and same-sex acts. The act of gross indecency must be committed willfully and in public." Under this section female homosexuality is illegal under public indecency laws.

In May 2013, the president of the Senate of Grenada called the island to reconsider its ban on same-sex sexual relationships and said that “the day is fast approaching” for Grenada and other Caribbean countries to repeal their sodomy laws.

== Discrimination protections ==
There is no explicit clause on equality or protection of privacy in the Grenada Constitution of 1973. Grenadian law does not address discrimination or harassment on the account of sexual orientation or gender identity.

== Summary table ==
| Same-sex sexual activity legal | No (Penalty: Up to 10 years' imprisonment, not enforced, repeal pending) |
| Equal age of consent | No |
| Anti-discrimination laws in employment | No |
| Anti-discrimination laws in the provision of goods and services | No |
| Anti-discrimination laws in all other areas (incl. indirect discrimination, hate speech) | No |
| Same-sex marriages | No |
| Recognition of same-sex couples | No |
| Step-child adoption by same-sex couples | No |
| Joint adoption by same-sex couples | No |
| Gays and lesbians allowed to serve openly in the military | Has no military |
| Right to change legal gender | No |
| Access to IVF for lesbians | No |
| Commercial surrogacy for gay male couples | No |
| MSMs allowed to donate blood | No |

== See also ==
- Politics of Grenada
- LGBT rights in the Commonwealth of Nations
- LGBT rights in the Americas
- LGBT rights by country or territory
