= LGBTQ rights in the Americas =

- Status of same-sex marriage and other types of same-sex partnerships in the Americas. Same-sex marriage^{1} Other type of registered partnership^{1} Limited domestic recognition^{1} Foreign marriages recognized for residency only Unrecognized Constitution restricts marriage to opposite-sex couples Unenforced ban on same-sex sexual activity^{1}May include recent laws or court decisions which have created legal recognition of same-sex relationships, but which have not entered into effect yet.
- Legal status: Legal in 31 out of 35 states; equal age of consent in 28 out of 35 states Legal in all 21 territories; equal age of consent in 16 out of 21 territories
- Gender identity: Legal in 14 out of 35 states Legal in 8 out of 21 territories
- Military: Allowed to serve openly in 14 out of 29 states that have an army Allowed in all 21 territories
- Discrimination protections: Protected in 23 out of 35 states Protected in 14 out of 21 territories

Family rights
- Recognition of relationships: Recognized in 12 out of 35 states Recognized in 18 out of 21 territories
- Restrictions: Same-sex marriage constitutionally banned in 7 out of 35 states
- Adoption: Legal in 8 out of 35 states Legal in 13 out of 21 territories

Laws governing lesbian, gay, bisexual, transgender and queer (LGBTQ) rights are complex and diverse in the Americas, and acceptance of LGBTQ persons varies widely.

Same-sex marriages are currently legal in Argentina, Brazil, Canada, Chile, Colombia, Costa Rica, Cuba, Ecuador, Mexico, United States and Uruguay. Free unions that are equivalent to marriage have begun to be recognized in Bolivia. Among non-independent states, same-sex marriage is also legal in Greenland, the British Overseas Territories of the Falkland Islands and South Georgia and the South Sandwich Islands, all French territories (Guadeloupe, Martinique, Saint Barthélemy, French Guiana, Saint Martin, and Saint Pierre and Miquelon), and in the Caribbean Netherlands, Aruba, and Curaçao, while marriages performed in the Netherlands are recognised in Sint Maarten. More than 800 million people live in nations or sub-national entities in the Americas where same-sex marriages are available.

On 9 January 2018, the Inter-American Court of Human Rights issued an advisory opinion that states party to the American Convention on Human Rights should grant same-sex couples accession to all existing domestic legal systems of family registration, including marriage, along with all rights that derive from marriage. The Supreme Courts of Honduras, Panama, Peru and Suriname have rejected the IACHR advisory opinion, while the Supreme Courts of Costa Rica and Ecuador adhered to it. Argentina, Brazil, Colombia, and Uruguay are also under the court's jurisdiction, but already had same-sex marriage before the ruling was handed down.

However, four other nations still have unenforced criminal penalties for "buggery" on their statute books. These are Grenada, Guyana, Jamaica, and Saint Vincent and the Grenadines. They are all former parts of the British West Indies. In addition, in Anguilla, the Bahamas, the Cayman Islands, Paraguay, Montserrat, Suriname and the Turks and Caicos Islands, the age of consent is higher for same-sex sexual relations than for opposite-sex ones, and in Bermuda, the age of consent for anal sex is higher than that for other types of sexual activities.

== Religion and LGBT acceptance ==
The British, French, Spanish and Portuguese colonists, who settled most of the Americas, brought Christianity from Europe. In particular, the Roman Catholic Church and the Protestants, both of which oppose legal recognition of homosexual relationships. These were followed by the Eastern Orthodox church, the Methodist Church, and some other Mainline (Protestant) denominations, such as the Reformed Church in America and the American Baptist Church, as well as conservative evangelical organizations and churches, such as the Evangelical Alliance and the Southern Baptist Convention. Pentecostal churches, such as the Assemblies of God, as well as restorationist churches (like Jehovah's Witnesses and Mormons), also take the position that homosexual sexual activity is ‘sinful’.

However, other denominations have become more accepting of LGBT people in recent decades, including the Episcopalian church in the United States, the Evangelical Lutheran Church (also in America), the Evangelical Lutheran Church of Canada, the Anglican Church of Canada, the United Church of Canada, the United Church of Christ, the Unitarian Universalist Association, and the Society of Friends (Quakers), as well as some congregations of the Presbyterian Church in America. Most of these denominations now perform same-sex weddings or blessings. Furthermore, many churches in the United Methodist Church (in the US) are choosing to officiate and bless same-sex marriage despite denomination-wide restrictions. In addition, in the United States, conservative Judaism, reform Judaism, and reconstructionist Judaism now welcome LGBT worshippers and perform same-sex weddings.

Indicates the country/territory has legalized same-sex adoption nationwide
Indicates that same-sex adoption is legal in certain parts of the country
Indicates that the country has step-child adoption or partner-guardianship

Opinion polls for same-sex adoption in Americas
| Country | Pollster | Year | For | Against | Don't know/neutral/no answer/other |
|---|---|---|---|---|---|
| Argentina | Ipsos | 2023 | 71% | 24% | 6% |
| Brazil | Ipsos | 2023 | 69% | 22% | 9% |
| Canada | Ipsos | 2023 | 74% | 17% | 9% |
| Chile | CADEM | 2022 | 70% | 28% | 2% |
| Colombia | Ipsos | 2023 | 53% | 40% | 7% |
| Mexico | Ipsos | 2023 | 60% | 34% | 6% |
| Peru | Ipsos | 2023 | 51% | 42% | 7% |
| United States | Ipsos | 2023 | 64% | 26% | 10% |
| Uruguay | Equipos Consultores | 2013 | 52% | 39% | 9% |
| Venezuela | Equilibrium Cende | 2023 | 48% (55%) | 39% (45%) | 13% |

Recognition of same-sex unions in South America Marriage Other type of partnership Unrecognized Constitution limits marriage to opposite-sex couples Same-sex sexual activity illegal, though penalties not enforced

Homosexuality laws in Central America and the Caribbean Islands. Same-sex marriage Other type of partnership Unregistered cohabitation No recognition of same-sex couples Constitution limits marriage to opposite-sex couples Same-sex sexual activity illegal but law not enforced

Recognition of same-sex unions in the Lesser Antilles and Puerto Rico Same-sex marriage Unregistered cohabitation Island subject to IACHR advisory opinion No recognition of same-sex couples Constitutional ban on same-sex marriage Same-sex sexual activity illegal but penalties not enforced

== Legislation by country or territory ==
=== North America ===
| LGBTQ rights in: | Same-sex sexual activity | Recognition of same-sex unions | Same-sex marriage | Adoption by same-sex couples | LGBT people allowed to serve openly in military | Anti-discrimination laws concerning sexual orientation | Laws concerning gender identity/expression |
|---|---|---|---|---|---|---|---|
| Bermuda (Overseas Territory of the United Kingdom) | Yes Legal since 1994; equal age of consent since 2019 + UN decl. sign. | Yes Domestic partnerships since 2018 | No Was legal between November 2018 and March 2022 and between May 2017 and June 2018 | Yes Legal since 2015 | Yes UK responsible for defence | Yes Bans all anti-gay discrimination | No |
| Canada | Yes Legal since 1969; equal age of consent since 1987 + UN decl. sign. | Yes Domestic partnerships in Nova Scotia (2001); Civil unions in Quebec (2002); Adult interdependent relationships in Alberta (2003); Common-law relationships in Manitoba (2004) | Yes Legal in some provinces and territories since 2003, nationwide since 2005 | Yes Legal in some provinces and territories since 1996, nationwide since 2011 | Yes Since 1992; Includes transgender people | Yes Bans all anti-gay discrimination. Ban on conversion therapy since 2022 nationwide | Yes / No Transgender people can change their gender and name without completion of medical intervention and human rights protections explicitly include gender identity or expression within all of Canada since 2017. |
| Greenland (Autonomous Territory within the Kingdom of Denmark) | Yes Legal since 1933; equal age of consent since 1977 + UN decl. sign. | Yes Registered partnerships between 1996 and 2016 (Existing partnerships are still recognised.) | Yes Legal since 2016 | Yes Stepchild adoption since 2009; joint adoption since 2016 | Yes The Kingdom of Denmark responsible for defence | Yes Bans all anti-gay discrimination | Yes Legal gender change and recognition possible without surgery or hormone therapy |
| Mexico | Yes Legal since 1871 + UN decl. sign. | Yes / No Civil unions in Mexico City (2007), Coahuila (2007), Colima (between 2013 and 2016), Campeche (2013), Jalisco (between 2014 and 2018), Michoacán (2015), Tlaxcala (2017), Veracruz (2020) and Baja California (2021). | Yes Starting in 2010; nationwide since 2022 | Yes / No Legal in Mexico City (2010), Coahuila (2014), Chihuahua (2015), Jalisco (2016), Michoacán (2016), Colima (2016), Morelos (2016), Campeche (2016), Veracruz (2016), Baja California (2017), Querétaro (2017), Chiapas (2017), Puebla (2017), Aguascalientes (2018), San Luis Potosi (2019), Hidalgo (2019), Yucatán (2021), Nayarit (2022), Quintana Roo (2022), Baja California Sur (2022), Zacatecas (2023), Tabasco (2024), Durango, Tamaulipas, and Nuevo León (the latter three never had adoption bans) | (ambiguous) | Yes Bans all anti-gay discrimination Pathologization or attempted treatment of sexual orientation by mental health professionals illegal in Mexico City (2020), México (2020), Baja California Sur (2020), Colima (2021), Tlaxcala (2021), Oaxaca (2021), Yucatán (2021), Zacatecas (2021), Baja California (2022), Hidalgo (2022), Jalisco (2022), Puebla (2022), Sonora (2022), Nuevo León (2022), Querétaro (2023), Sinaloa (2023), Quintana Roo (2023), Morelos (2023), Guerrero (2024), Michoacán (2024), and nationwide (2024). | Yes / No Transgender persons can change their legal gender and name in Mexico City (2008), Michoacán (2017), Nayarit (2017), Coahuila (2018), Hidalgo (2019), San Luis Potosí (2019), Colima (2019), Baja California (2019), Oaxaca (2019), Tlaxcala (2019), Chihuahua (2019), Sonora (2020), Jalisco (2020), Quintana Roo (2020), Puebla (2021), Baja California Sur (2021), México (2021), Morelos (2021), Sinaloa (2022), Zacatecas (2022), Durango (2023), Yucatán (2024), Campeche (2024), and Tabasco (2025). |
| Saint Pierre and Miquelon (Overseas collectivity of France) | Yes Legal since 1791 + UN decl. sign. | Yes Civil solidarity pact since 1999 | Yes Legal since 2013 | Yes Legal since 2013 | Yes | Yes Bans all anti-gay discrimination | Yes Under French law |
| United States | Yes Legal in some states since 1962, nationwide since 2003 + UN decl. sign. | Yes Domestic partnerships in California (1999), the District of Columbia (2002), Maine (2004), Washington (2007), Maryland (2008), Oregon (2008), Nevada (2009) and Wisconsin (2009). Civil unions in Vermont (2000), Connecticut (2005), New Jersey (2007), New Hampshire (2008), Illinois (2011), Rhode Island (2011), Delaware (2012), Hawaii (2012) and Colorado (2013). | Yes Legal in some states since 2004, nationwide since 2015 | Yes Legal in some states since 1993, nationwide since 2016 | Yes / No Lesbians, gays, and bisexuals have been allowed to serve openly in the U.S. military since 2011, following the repeal of the Don't Ask, Don't Tell policy. Transgender people previously allowed to serve openly, but restrictions have been placed on those with a history of gender dysphoria. "Transvestites" are currently banned from the military since 2012. Most openly Intersex people may be banned from the military under the Armed Forces ban of "hermaphrodites". | Yes / No Employment discrimination on the basis of sexual orientation is prohibited nationwide since 2020. More extensive protections exist in 23 states, DC, and some municipalities. Conversion therapy for minors is banned in 22 states, DC, and some municipalities. Sexual orientation is covered by the federal hate crime law since 2009. | Yes / No Gender X became available and recognized formally on US passports in April 2022. This was rescinded in 2025 at the beginning of president Trump's second term;. Gender change is legal on birth certificates (under varying conditions by state), in 42 states + DC. Nonbinary gender markers are available, under varying circumstances, in 25 states + DC. Employment discrimination on the basis of gender identity is prohibited nationwide since 2020. More extensive protections exist in 22 states, DC, and some municipalities. |

=== Central America ===
| LGBT rights in: | Same-sex sexual activity | Recognition of same-sex unions | Same-sex marriage | Adoption by same-sex couples | LGBT people allowed to serve openly in military | Anti-discrimination laws concerning sexual orientation | Laws concerning gender identity/expression |
|---|---|---|---|---|---|---|---|
| Belize | Yes Legal since 2016 | No | No | No | Yes | Yes Bans all anti-gay discrimination | No |
| Costa Rica | Yes Legal since 1971 + UN decl. sign. | Yes Unregistered cohabitation since 2014 | Yes Legal since 2020 | Yes Legal since 2020 | Has no military | Yes Bans all anti-gay discrimination | Yes / No Transgender persons can change their legal name without surgeries or judicial permission since 2018. Legal gender cannot be changed. Sex indicator removed from all ID cards issued since May 2018 One-time sex change allowed for passports. |
| El Salvador | Yes Legal since 1822 + UN decl. sign. | No | No | No | Yes | Yes Bans all anti-gay discrimination | No Bans discrimination based on gender identity. |
| Guatemala | Yes Legal since 1871 + UN decl. sign. | No Pending | No | No | | Yes Bans some anti-gay discrimination | No |
| Honduras | Yes Legal since 1899 + UN decl. sign. | No Constitutional ban on de facto unions since 2005 | No Constitutional ban since 2005; court decision pending | No Constitutional ban since 2005 | No | Yes Bans all anti-gay discrimination | No |
| Nicaragua | Yes Legal since 2008 + UN decl. sign. | No | No | No | | Yes Bans some anti-gay discrimination | No |
| Panama | Yes Legal since 2008 + UN decl. sign. | No Court decision pending | No Court decision pending | No Court decision pending | Has no military | Yes Bans some anti-gay discrimination | Yes Transgender persons can change their legal gender and name after completion of medical intervention since 2006 |

=== Caribbean ===
| LGBT rights in: | Same-sex sexual activity | Recognition of same-sex unions | Same-sex marriage | Adoption by same-sex couples | LGBT people allowed to serve openly in military | Anti-discrimination laws concerning sexual orientation | Laws concerning gender identity/expression |
|---|---|---|---|---|---|---|---|
| Anguilla (Overseas Territory of the United Kingdom) | Yes Legal since 2001; Age of consent discrepancy + UN decl. sign. | No | No | No | Yes UK responsible for defence | Yes Bans some anti-gay discrimination | |
| Antigua and Barbuda | Yes Legal since 2022 | No | No | No | Yes | Yes Bans all anti-gay discrimination | No |
| Aruba (Constituent country of the Kingdom of the Netherlands) | Yes Legal (No laws against same-sex sexual activity have ever existed in the country) + UN decl. sign. | Yes Registered partnerships since 2021 | Yes | Yes | Yes The Netherlands responsible for defence | Yes Bans all anti-gay discrimination | |
| (The Bahamas) Bahamas | Yes Legal since 1991; Age of consent discrepancy + UN decl. sign. | No | No | No | Yes | Yes Bans some anti-gay discrimination | No |
| Barbados | Yes Legal since 2022. | No / Yes Foreign Domestic Partnerships recognized for immigration purposes "Welcome Stamp" | No | No | Yes | Yes Bans some anti-gay discrimination | No |
| Bonaire (a special municipality of the Netherlands) | Yes Legal (No laws against same-sex sexual activity have ever existed in the municipalities) + UN decl. sign. | Yes Registered partnerships since 2012 | Yes Legal since 2012 | Yes | Yes The Netherlands responsible for defence | Yes Bans all anti-gay discrimination | Yes |
| British Virgin Islands (Overseas Territory of the United Kingdom) | Yes Legal since 2001 + UN decl. sign. | No | No | No | Yes UK responsible for defence | Yes Bans all anti-gay discrimination | No |
| Cayman Islands (Overseas Territory of the United Kingdom) | Yes Legal since 2001; Age of consent discrepancy + UN decl. sign. | Yes Civil partnerships since 2020 | No | Yes Legal since 2020 | Yes UK responsible for defence | Yes Bans some anti-gay discrimination | No |
| Cuba | Yes Legal since 1979 + UN decl. sign. | Legal since 2022 | Legal since 2022 | Legal since 2022 | Yes | Yes Bans all anti-gay discrimination | Yes Transgender people allowed to change gender after sex change operations |
| Curaçao (Constituent country of the Kingdom of the Netherlands) | Yes Legal (No laws against same-sex sexual activity have ever existed in the country) + UN decl. sign. | Yes | Yes | Yes | Yes The Netherlands responsible for defence | Yes Bans all anti-gay discrimination | |
| Dominica | Yes Legal since 2024 + UN decl. sign. | No | No | No | Has no military | Yes Bans some anti-gay discrimination | No |
| Dominican Republic | Yes Legal since 1822 + UN decl. sign. | No | No Constitutional ban since 2010 | No | Yes Since 2025 | Yes Bans some anti-gay discrimination | No |
| Grenada | No Male illegal since 1987; Penalty: 10-year prison sentence (not enforced). Legalization proposed Yes Female always legal | No | No | No | Has no military | Yes Bans some anti-gay discrimination | No |
| Guadeloupe (Overseas department of France) | Yes Legal since 1791 + UN decl. sign. | Yes Civil solidarity pact since 1999 | Yes Legal since 2013 | Yes Legal since 2013 | Yes France responsible for defence | Yes Bans all anti-gay discrimination | Yes Under French law |
| Haiti | Yes Legal since 1791 (as Saint-Domingue) | No | No | No | Has no military | Yes Bans some anti-gay discrimination | No |
| Jamaica | No Male illegal since 1864; Penalty: 10 years and/or hard labor (Not enforced). Legalization proposed Yes Female always legal. | No | No Constitutional ban since 2011 | No | No | Yes Bans some anti-gay discrimination | No |
| Martinique (Overseas department of France) | Yes Legal since 1791 + UN decl. sign. | Yes Civil solidarity pact since 1999 | Yes Legal since 2013 | Yes Legal since 2013 | Yes France responsible for defence | Yes Bans all anti-gay discrimination | Yes Under French law |
| Montserrat (Overseas Territory of the United Kingdom) | Yes Legal since 2001 + UN decl. sign. | No | No | No | Yes UK responsible for defence | Yes Bans all anti-gay discrimination | |
| Puerto Rico (Commonwealth of the United States) | Yes Legal since 2003 | Yes Legal since 2015 | Yes Legal since 2015 | Yes Legal since 2015 | Yes United States responsible for defense | Yes Bans some anti-gay discrimination | Yes Gender change legal since 2018; does not require surgery |
| (Saba (island)) Saba (a special municipality of the Netherlands) | Yes Legal (No laws against same-sex sexual activity have ever existed in the municipalities) + UN decl. sign. | Yes Registered partnerships since 2012 | Yes Legal since 2012 | Yes | Yes The Netherlands responsible for defence | Yes Bans all anti-gay discrimination | Yes |
| Saint Barthélemy (Overseas collectivity of France) | Yes Legal since 1791 + UN decl. sign. | Yes Civil solidarity pact since 1999 | Yes Legal since 2013 | Yes Legal since 2013 | Yes France responsible for defence | Yes Bans all anti-gay discrimination | Yes Under French law |
| Saint Kitts and Nevis | Yes Legal since 2022 | No | No | No | Yes | Yes Bans some anti-gay discrimination | |
| Saint Lucia | Yes Legal since 2025 | No | No | No | Has no military | Yes Bans some anti-gay discrimination | No |
| Saint Martin (Overseas collectivity of France) | Yes Legal since 1791 + UN decl. sign. | Yes Civil solidarity pact since 1999 | Yes Legal since 2013 | Yes Legal since 2013 | Yes France responsible for defence | Yes Bans all anti-gay discrimination | Yes Under French law |
| Saint Vincent and the Grenadines | No Illegal since 1989; Penalty: Fine and/or 10-year prison sentence (Not enforced). Legalization proposed | No | No | No | Has no military | Yes Bans some anti-gay discrimination | |
| Sint Eustatius (a special municipality of the Netherlands) | Yes Legal (No laws against same-sex sexual activity have ever existed in the municipalities) + UN decl. sign. | Yes Registered partnerships since 2012 | Yes Legal since 2012 | Yes | Yes The Netherlands responsible for defence | Yes Bans all anti-gay discrimination | Yes |
| Sint Maarten (Constituent country of the Kingdom of the Netherlands) | Yes Legal (No laws against same-sex sexual activity have ever existed in the country) + UN decl. sign. | No | No / Yes Same-sex marriages performed in the Netherlands recognized | No | Yes The Netherlands responsible for defence | Yes Bans all anti-gay discrimination | |
| Trinidad and Tobago | Yes Legal 2018-2025, again since 2026. | No | No | No | No | Yes Bans some anti-gay discrimination | No |
| Turks and Caicos Islands (Overseas Territory of the United Kingdom) | Yes Legal since 2001; Age of consent discrepancy + UN decl. sign. | No | No | No | Yes UK responsible for defence | Yes Bans all anti-gay discrimination | Yes / No Gender identity change is not recognized for the purpose of inheritance of hereditary peerages and baronetcies, which is subject to Section 16 of the United Kingdom's Gender Recognition Act 2004. |
| United States Virgin Islands (Territory of the United States) | Yes Legal since 1985 | Yes Legal since 2015 | Yes Legal since 2015 | Yes Legal since 2015 | Yes United States responsible for defense | Yes Bans all anti-gay discrimination | Yes Legislation enacted in 2022, also explicitly includes gender identity. |

=== South America ===
| LGBT rights in: | Same-sex sexual activity | Recognition of same-sex unions | Same-sex marriage | Adoption by same-sex couples | LGBT people allowed to serve openly in military | Anti-discrimination laws concerning sexual orientation | Laws concerning gender identity/expression |
|---|---|---|---|---|---|---|---|
| Argentina | Yes Legal since 1887 + UN decl. sign. | Yes Civil unions in Buenos Aires (2003), Río Negro Province (2003), Villa Carlos Paz (2007) and Río Cuarto (2009); Cohabitation unions nationwide since 2015 | Yes Legal since 2010 | Yes Legal since 2010 | Yes Since 2009 | Yes / No Legal protection in some cities; pending nationwide. Pathologization or attempted treatment of sexual orientation by mental health professionals illegal since 2010 | Yes Transgender persons can change their legal gender and name without surgeries or judicial order since 2012 Transgender persons have a law reserving 1% of Argentina's public sector jobs. Economic incentives included in the new law aim to help trans people find work in all sectors. |
| Bolivia | Yes Legal since 1832 + UN decl. sign. | Yes Free unions officially recognised starting in 2020; nationwide since 2023. | No Constitutional ban since 2009 | Yes Same-sex couples in a free union are permitted to adopt | Yes Since 2015; Includes transgender people | Yes Bans all anti-gay discrimination | Yes Transgender persons can change their legal gender and name without surgeries or judicial order since 2016 |
| Brazil | Yes Legal since 1830 + UN decl. sign. | Yes "Stable unions" legal and all rights as recognized family entities available nationwide since 2011 | Yes Starting in 2011; nationwide since 2013 | Yes Legal since 2010 | Yes Since 1969 | Yes Bans all anti-gay discrimination. Pathologization or attempted treatment of sexual orientation by mental health professionals illegal since 1999 | Yes Transgender people can change their legal gender and name before a notary without the need of surgeries or judicial order since 2018. The sex reassignment surgery, hormonal and psychological treatment are offered free of charge by the Brazilian Unified Health System (UHS) |
| Chile | Yes Legal since 1999; equal age of consent since 2022 + UN decl. sign. | Yes Civil unions since 2015 | Yes Legal since 2022 | Yes Legal since 2022 | Yes Since 2012; Includes transgender people | Yes Bans all anti-gay discrimination Pathologization or attempted treatment of sexual orientation by mental health professionals illegal since 2021 | Yes Transsexual persons can change their registral sex and name since 1974. Transgender persons can change their registral sex and name, no surgeries or judicial order for adults above 18 years old since 2019. |
| Colombia | Yes Legal since 1981 + UN decl. sign. | Yes De facto marital union since 2007 | Yes Legal since 2016 | Yes Stepchild adoption since 2014; joint adoption since 2015 | Yes Since 1999 | Yes Bans all anti-gay discrimination | Yes Since 2015, transgender persons can change their legal gender and name manifesting their solemn will before a notary, no surgeries or judicial order required |
| Ecuador | Yes Legal since 1997 + UN decl. sign. | Yes De facto unions since 2009 | Yes Legal since 2019 | No LGBT individuals may adopt, but not same-sex couples | | Yes Bans all anti-gay discrimination. Pathologization or attempted treatment of sexual orientation by mental health professionals illegal since 2014 | Yes Since 2016, transgender persons are allowed to change their birth name and gender identity; no surgeries or judicial order required |
| Falkland Islands (Overseas Territory of the United Kingdom) | Yes Legal since 1989; equal age of consent since 2006 + UN decl. sign. | Yes Civil partnerships since 2017 | Yes Legal since 2017 | Yes Legal since 2017 | Yes UK responsible for defence | Yes Bans all anti-gay discrimination | No |
| French Guiana (Overseas department of France) | Yes Legal since 1791 + UN decl. sign. | Yes Civil solidarity pact since 1999 | Yes Legal since 2013 | Yes Legal since 2013 | Yes France responsible for defence | Yes Bans all anti-gay discrimination | Yes Under French law |
| Guyana | No Male illegal since 1893; Penalty: Up to life imprisonment (Not enforced). Legalization proposed Yes Female always legal | No | No | | Yes | Yes Bans some anti-gay discrimination | No |
| Paraguay | Yes Legal since 1880; Age of consent discrepancy + UN decl. sign. | No Constitutional ban on de facto unions since 1992 | No Constitutional ban since 1992 | No | Yes | Yes Bans some anti-gay discrimination. Pathologization or attempted treatment of sexual orientation by mental health professionals illegal since 2022 | No |
| Peru | Yes Legal since 1924; equal age of consent since 2012 + UN decl. sign. | No / Yes Limited recognition for same-sex partners of health-care workers since 2020. | No | No | Yes Since 2009 | Yes Bans all anti-gay discrimination | Yes Transgender persons can change their legal gender and name without the need for the completion of medical intervention since 2016. Judicial order required. |
| South Georgia and the South Sandwich Islands (Overseas Territory of the United Kingdom) | Yes Legal since 2001 + UN decl. sign. | Yes Legal since 2014 | Yes Legal since 2014 | | Yes UK responsible for defence | Yes Bans some anti-gay discrimination | No |
| Suriname | Yes Legal since 1869 (as Dutch Guiana) | No | Yes Since 13 February 2025, Court recognizes 2 same-sex marriages performed abroad | No | | Yes Bans all anti-gay discrimination | Yes Transgender persons can change their legal gender since 2022. Court order required. |
| Uruguay | Yes Legal since 1934 + UN decl. sign. | Yes Concubinage union since 2008 | Yes Legal since 2013 | Yes Legal since 2009 | Yes Since 2009 | Yes Bans all anti-gay discrimination. Pathologization or attempted treatment of sexual orientation by mental health professionals illegal since 2017 | Yes Transgender persons can change their legal gender and name without surgeries or judicial order required since 2009. Self-determination since 2018. |
| Venezuela | Yes Legal since 1997 + UN decl. sign. | No Constitutional ban on de facto stable unions since 1999 | No Constitutional ban since 1999 | No | Yes Since 2023 | Yes Bans some anti-gay discrimination | No |

== Public opinion ==
=== Same-sex marriage ===
Indicates the country/territory has legalized same-sex marriage nationwide
Indicates that same-sex marriage is legal in certain parts of the country
Indicates that the country has civil unions or registered partnerships
Indicates that same-sex sexual activity is illegal

Opinion polls for same-sex marriage by country
| Country | Pollster | Year | For | Against | Neutral (Note: Also comprises: Don't know; No answer; Other; Refused.) | Margin of error | Source |
|---|---|---|---|---|---|---|---|
| Antigua and Barbuda | AmericasBarometer | 2017 | 12% | - | - | | |
| Argentina | Ipsos | 2023 | 70% | 16% [8% support some rights] | 14% not sure | ±3.5% | |
| Aruba | | 2021 | 46% | | | | |
| (The Bahamas) Bahamas | AmericasBarometer | 2014 | 11% | - | - | | |
| Belize | AmericasBarometer | 2014 | 8% | - | - | | |
| Bolivia | AmericasBarometer | 2017 | 35% | - | - | | |
| Brazil | Ipsos | 2023 | 51% | 29% [15% support some rights] | 20% not sure | ±3.5% (Note: [+ more urban/educated than representative]) | |
| Canada | Ipsos | 2023 | 69% | 17% [7% support some rights] | 15% not sure | ±3.5% | |
| Chile | Ipsos | 2023 | 65% | 24% [18% support some rights] | 12% | ±3.5% | |
| Colombia | Ipsos | 2023 | 49% | 33% [21% support some rights] | 18% | | |
| Costa Rica | CIEP | 2018 | 35% | 64% | 1% | | |
| Cuba | Gallup | 2019 | 63.1% | 36.9% | | | |
| Dominica | AmericasBarometer | 2017 | 10% | - | - | | |
| Dominican Republic | CDN 37 | 2018 | 45% | 55% | - | | |
| Ecuador | AmericasBarometer | 2019 | 22.9% | 51.3% | 25.8% | | |
| El Salvador | Universidad Francisco Gavidia | 2021 | | 82.5% | | | |
| Grenada | AmericasBarometer | 2017 | 12% | - | - | | |
| Guatemala | AmericasBarometer | 2017 | 23% | - | - | | |
| Guyana | AmericasBarometer | 2017 | 21% | - | - | | |
| Haiti | AmericasBarometer | 2017 | 5% | - | - | | |
| Honduras | CID Gallup | 2018 | 17% | 75% | 8% | | |
| Jamaica | AmericasBarometer | 2017 | 16% | - | - | | |
| Mexico | Ipsos | 2023 | 58% | 28% [17% support some rights] | 14% not sure | ±4.8% | |
| Nicaragua | AmericasBarometer | 2017 | 25% | - | - | | |
| Panama | AmericasBarometer | 2017 | 22% | - | - | | |
| Paraguay | AmericasBarometer | 2017 | 26% | - | - | | |
| Peru | Ipsos | 2023 | 41% | 40% [24% support some rights] | 19% | ±3.5% | |
| Saint Kitts and Nevis | AmericasBarometer | 2017 | 9% | - | - | | |
| Saint Lucia | AmericasBarometer | 2017 | 11% | - | - | | |
| Saint Vincent and the Grenadines | AmericasBarometer | 2017 | 4% | - | - | | |
| Suriname | AmericasBarometer | 2014 | 18% | - | - | | |
| Trinidad and Tobago | AmericasBarometer | 2014 | 16% | - | - | | |
| United States | Marquette | 2022 | 72% | 28% | – | | |
| United States | Selzer | 2022 | 74% (83%) | 13% (17%) | 13% not sure | | |
| United States | Quinnipiac | 2022 | 68% (77%) | 22% (23%) | 10% | | |
| United States | Ipsos | 2023 | 54% | 31% [14% support some rights] | 15% not sure | ±3.5% | |
| Uruguay | Equipos Consultores | 2019 | 59% | 28% | 13% | | |
| Venezuela | Equilibrium Cende | 2023 | 55% (63%) | 32% (37%) | 13% | | |

== See also ==
- LGBTQ rights in Africa
- LGBTQ rights in Asia
- LGBTQ rights in Europe
- LGBTQ rights in Oceania
- Recognition of same-sex unions in the Americas
- Same-sex marriage in tribal nations in the United States
- Travesti (gender identity)
- Decriminalization of homosexuality in Ecuador
- Timeline of LGBT history in Ecuador
