= LGBTQ rights in Guernsey =

- Guernsey
- Legal status: Legal since 1983, age of consent equal since 2012
- Gender identity: Transgender people can legally change gender since 2007
- Military: UK responsible for defence
- Discrimination protections: Protections for gender identity ("gender reassignment") since 2005. Protections for sexual orientation effective from 1 October 2023.

Family rights
- Recognition of relationships: Same-sex marriage in Guernsey since 2017; in Alderney since 2018; and Sark since 2020
- Adoption: Full adoption rights since 2017

Lesbian, gay, bisexual, and transgender (LGBT) rights in the British Crown dependency of Guernsey have improved significantly in the past decades. Same-sex sexual activity for both men and women is legal in Guernsey. Same-sex marriage has been legal since 2 May 2017 in Guernsey, and since 14 June 2018 in its dependency, Alderney. Legislation approving the legalisation of same-sex marriage in its other dependency, Sark was given royal assent on 11 March 2020. Guernsey is the only part of the British Isles to have never enacted civil partnership legislation, though civil partnerships performed in the United Kingdom were recognised for succession purposes. Since April 2017, same-sex couples can adopt in the entire Bailiwick. Discrimination based on sexual orientation and gender identity has been banned since 2004. Transgender people have been able to legally change gender since 2007.

== Law regarding same-sex sexual activity ==
Prior to 1983, same-sex sexual activity was illegal; after decriminalisation, the age of consent was set at 21 (in line with the UK at that time). In 2000, the age of consent for male same-sex sexual acts was lowered to 18. In 2010, the States of Guernsey backed, in principle, a proposal to equalise the age of consent at 16. Legislation to this effect was approved in 2011 and took effect on 5 November 2012. However, Guernsey retains some specific male homosexual offences in its criminal law, including a ban on homosexual sexual acts not conducted in private.

== Recognition of same-sex relationships ==
Guernsey has recognised civil partnerships performed in the United Kingdom and other relationships treated as such by UK law for succession purposes in inheritance and other matters respecting interests in property since 2 April 2012. A proposal to abolish state-sanctioned marriages in favour of a Union Civile (for both opposite-sex and same-sex couples) was rejected by the States in favour of a same-sex marriage law in December 2015.

In December 2015, the States of Guernsey approved a motion to legalise same-sex marriage by a vote of 37–7. A bill legalising same-sex marriage was drafted and formally approved by the States on 21 September 2016. It received royal assent later that year and went into effect on 2 May 2017.

The law did not apply to Alderney and Sark. Alderney previously recognised same-sex marriages from abroad for certain purposes (i.e. inheritance). On 18 October 2017, the States of Alderney voted 9-0 in favour of same-sex marriage. The law received royal assent 13 December 2017, and went into effect on 14 June 2018.

In December 2019 the Chief Pleas of Sark passed a bill legalising same-sex marriage. Royal assent was granted in March 2020 and the law came into effect on 23 April 2020.

=== Religious same-sex marriages ===
In January 2022, the Methodist church of Sark allow for the recognition and practice of same-sex marriage effective immediately with a motion passed at an annual conference. Both the Anglican church and the Catholic church are legally prohibited and banned from both Sark law and Canon law regarding same-sex marriage.

== Discrimination protections ==
In 2004 a law was passed that would allow the States of Guernsey to pass Ordinances on the topic of discrimination, including sexual orientation and gender identity. In 2005 was used to ban discrimination based on gender identity, as part of the Sex Discrimination (Employment) (Guernsey) Ordinance, 2005. As of 2020, however, no equivalent Ordinance has been passed to specifically outlaw discrimination on the basis of sexual orientation.

Anti-discrimination protections that cover sexual orientation and gender identity have existed in child welfare proceedings in Guernsey and Alderney since 2008 and in Sark since 2016.

In September 2022, the Guernsey lawmaking body passed an extensive anti-discrimination bill into law voted unanimously (33-0) - to explicitly include "sexual orientation". All amendments were rejected regarding exemptions for small businesses with 5 employees or less and religious affiliations. The legislation will formally go into effect from 1 October 2023.

== Adoption and parenting ==
Lesbian couples can access IVF and artificial insemination since 2009.

In May 2015, Guernsey's Chief Minister announced that a review of the Adoption (Guernsey) Law, 1960 which barred unmarried couples from jointly adopting was scheduled for 24 June 2015. The Chief Minister hoped to extend full adoption rights to couples in overseas civil partnerships and unmarried couples who have lived together for some time. On 24 June 2015, the States of Guernsey agreed by a vote of 38 to 2 to bring about changes to its adoption law.

Since April 2017, same-sex couples can jointly adopt in Guernsey. The Population Management (Guernsey) Law, 2016, which took effect on 3 April, contains provisions allowing same-sex couples who are married, in a civil partnership or in a "subsisting relationship akin to marriage or civil partnership" to adopt. The law only applies to the island of Guernsey. However, adoption applications from Alderney and Sark are dealt with in Guernsey courts, as such same-sex adoption is legal in the entire Bailiwick.

== Gender identity and expression ==
Since 2007, transgender people can legally change their gender on their birth certificates. However, Guernsey law only allows a new birth certificate to be issued, it does not amend or remove records from existing birth certificates.

== Blood donation ==
Gay and bisexual men have been allowed to donate blood, provided they have not had sex for a year, since 2011.

In June 2021, it was proposed that the Channel Islands would be implementing the "UK-model on risk based assessments" of blood donation. It is not yet clear when the policy goes into effect.

== Local LGBT charities and organisations ==
Liberate is the only organisation in the Channel Islands that represents the local LGBT community. It was established in February 2014 with the aim to "include, inform and support the local LGBTQ community", as well as to reform discriminatory laws in the Bailiwick.

== Summary table ==
Same-sex sexual activity legal	Yes (Since 1984)
Equal age of consent (16)	Yes (Since 2012)
Anti-discrimination laws in employment only	Yes (Since 2004, for gender identity; since 2023 for sexual orientation)
Anti-discrimination laws in the provision of goods and services	No (Powers to outlaw this have existed since 2004 but have not been used)
Anti-discrimination laws in all other areas (incl. indirect discrimination, hate speech)	Yes (In some areas, e.g. child welfare proceedings)
Same-sex marriage	Yes (Since 2017 in Guernsey, 2018 in Alderney, and 2020 in Sark)
Recognition of same-sex couples	Yes (Since 2012 in Guernsey, 2016 in Alderney, and 2020 in Sark)
Stepchild adoption by same-sex couples	Yes (Since 2017)
Joint adoption by same-sex couples	Yes (Since 2017)
LGBTQ persons allowed to serve openly in the military	Yes (UK responsible for defence)
Right to change legal gender	Yes (Since 2007)
Access to IVF for lesbian couples	Yes (Since 2009)
Commercial surrogacy for gay male couples	No (Also banned for heterosexual couples)
MSMs allowed to donate blood	Yes / No (1 year deferral period)

== See also ==
- Politics of Guernsey
- LGBTQ rights in Jersey
- LGBTQ rights in the United Kingdom
