= LGBTQ rights in Jersey =

- Jersey
- Legal status: Legal since 1990, equal age of consent since 2006
- Gender identity: Right to change legal gender since 2010
- Military: UK responsible for defence
- Discrimination protections: Sexual orientation, gender reassignment and intersex status

Family rights
- Recognition of relationships: Civil partnerships since 2012; Same-sex marriage since 2018
- Adoption: Full adoption rights since 2012

Lesbian, gay, bisexual, transgender and queer (LGBTQ) rights in the British Crown dependency of Jersey have evolved significantly since the early 1990s. Same-sex sexual activity was decriminalised in 1990. Since then, LGBTQ people have been given many more rights equal to other Jersey citizens, such as an equal age of consent (2006), the right to change legal gender for transgender people (2010), the right to enter into civil partnerships (2012), the right to adopt children (2012) and very broad anti-discrimination and legal protections on the basis of "sexual orientation, gender reassignment and intersex status" (2015). Jersey is the only British territory that explicitly includes "intersex status" within anti-discrimination laws. Same-sex marriage has been legal in Jersey since 1 July 2018.

The status of LGBTQ rights is similar to that of the United Kingdom and the other two Crown dependencies (the Isle of Man and Guernsey). Societal acceptance of homosexuality and same-sex relationships is high. Jersey organised its first public LGBTQ event in July 2014, when hundreds of participants gathered in Saint Helier to call for the legalisation of same-sex marriage.

== Law regarding same-sex sexual activity ==
Prior to 1990, same-sex sexual activity was a criminal offence. The age of consent was lowered from 21 to 18 in 1995, exactly one year after the United Kingdom lowered the age of consent to 18. The age of consent has been equal at 16 since 2006.

=== Pardon scheme ===
In May 2024, it was formally announced that a pardon scheme would be established to remove gay sex sexual offences (prior to 1990) in regarding to Jersey - on an individuals criminal record. A similar pardon scheme known as the “Alan Turing Law” was implemented in the UK by legislation.

== Recognition of same-sex relationships ==
Jersey allows same-sex couples to enter into civil partnerships or marriages.

=== Civil partnerships ===
On 20 October 2009, the States of Jersey (Parliament) voted in favour of civil partnerships "in principle". The vote was 48 in favour, 1 against and 4 abstaining. Legislation allowing for civil partnerships was approved on 12 July 2011. The bill was signed by Queen Elizabeth II on 14 December 2011 and registered by the royal court on 6 January 2012. The law took effect on 2 April 2012. It also allows same-sex couples to register their civil partnership in churches, if the church in question chooses to do so.

In March 2022, a bill passed the States of Jersey that allows heterosexual couples to enter civil partnerships - not just same-sex couples. It is expected to go into effect from January 1, 2023.

=== Marriage ===
The States made an in-principle agreement to legalise same-sex marriage on 22 September 2015, voting 37–4. Legislation to bring the law into effect was introduced in October 2017. Though delayed on several occasions, the same-sex marriage legislation was approved by the States on 1 February 2018, by a vote of 43–1. The bill received royal assent 23 May 2018, and went into effect on 1 July 2018. The first couple married shortly thereafter, on 9 July.

== Adoption and parenting ==
Both joint and stepchild adoption have been legal since 2012, when the civil partnership law came into effect.

Additionally, lesbian couples can access artificial insemination.

On 23 June 2015, the States of Jersey agreed to bring about changes in their adoption laws, called the Adoption (Amendment No. 7) (Jersey) Law 2015, to grant unmarried couples full adoption rights. Previously, only married couples and couples in civil partnerships were allowed to apply to adopt children. The law came into effect on 16 October 2015.

=== Parentage legislation introduction ===
In December 2023, legislation was introduced to formally recognize children of same-sex couples by parentage from IVF and surrogacy to the Jersey Assembly - a legal first for the Channel Islands. The legislation would meet compliance and obligations based on the United Nations Convention on the Rights of the Child. The law was passed unanimously by the Assembly in March 2024, and was due to be brought into effect with all regulations by the end of that year.

== Discrimination protections ==
On 2 June 2015, Jersey passed the Discrimination (Sex and Related Characteristics) (Jersey) Regulations 2015, protecting LGBTQ and intersex people from discrimination. The legislation was approved on third reading by 37 members voting in favour, 1 abstention and 11 absences, and went into effect on 1 September 2015.

== Gender identity and expression ==
Transgender people are allowed to change their legal gender and to have their new gender recognised as a result of the Gender Recognition (Jersey) Law 2010.

Additionally, transgender people are fully protected through anti-discrimination laws.

== Blood donation ==
Gay and bisexual men have been allowed to donate blood, provided they haven't had sex in a year, since 2011. In March 2019, it was confirmed that the 12 month criterion is under review, following the introduction of more advanced blood testing technology. In December 2019, it was revealed that this review would not take place until 2021 at the earliest.

In June 2021, it is proposed that the Channel Islands will be implementing the "UK-model on risk based assessments" of blood donation. It is not clear on when the policy goes into effect yet.

== Local charities working for LGBT rights ==
Liberate is the only organisation in the Channel Islands that represents the local LGBTQ community and other minority groups. It was established in Guernsey in February 2014 and in Jersey in August 2014. The Jersey branch lobbied to ensure that intersex people were included in Jersey's Discrimination (Sex and Related Characteristics) (Jersey) Regulations 2015 and campaigning to legalise same-sex marriage.

== Summary table ==
Same-sex sexual activity legal	Yes (Since 1990)
Equal age of consent (16)	Yes (Since 2006)
Anti-discrimination laws in employment	Yes (Since 2015)
Anti-discrimination laws in the provision of goods and services	Yes (Since 2015)
Anti-discrimination laws in all other areas (incl. indirect discrimination, hate speech)	Yes (Since 2015)
Anti-discrimination laws covering gender identity in all areas	Yes (Since 2015)
Discrimination based on intersex status prohibited	Yes (Since 2015)
Same-sex marriages	Yes (Since 2018)
Recognition of same-sex couples (e.g. civil partnerships)	Yes (Since 2012)
Stepchild adoption by same-sex couples	Yes (Since 2012)
Joint adoption by same-sex couples	No (Since 2012)
LGBTQ people allowed to serve openly in the military	Yes (Since 2000)
Right to change legal gender	Yes (Since 2010)
Access to IVF for lesbians	Yes (Since 2012)
Commercial surrogacy for gay male couples	No (Banned for heterosexual couples as well)
MSMs allowed to donate blood	Yes / No (12 month deferral period since 2011)

== See also ==
- Politics of Jersey
- LGBTQ rights in Guernsey
- LGBTQ rights in the United Kingdom
- LGBTQ rights in Europe
- Age of consent in Europe
