= LGBTQ rights in Lesotho =

- Lesotho
- Legal status: Legal since 2012
- Gender identity: Legal since 1975
- Military: No
- Discrimination protections: Sexual orientation and gender identity protections

Family rights
- Recognition of relationships: No
- Adoption: No

Lesbian, gay, bisexual, transgender, and queer (LGBTQ) people in Lesotho have seen improvements in the 21st century, although LGBTQ people continue to face legal challenges not experienced by non-LGBTQ residents. Lesotho does not recognise same-sex marriages or civil unions. Discrimination on the basis of sexual orientation and gender identity in employment is banned since 2024.

LGBTQ people face societal rejection and discrimination in Lesotho. Nevertheless, attitudes towards members of the LGBTQ community are slowly evolving and becoming more tolerant and accepting, in line with worldwide trends. In 2012, Lesotho legalised homosexuality, and on 18 May 2013, the first gay pride march took place in the country.

== History ==
Homosexuality and same-sex relations have been documented in Lesotho for centuries. The Basotho had a tradition of young men (boukonchana or alternatively inkotshane, also known as boy-wife in English) who typically dressed as women, performed chores associated with women, such as cooking and fetching water and firewood, and had intercrural sex with their older husbands (numa). In addition, they were not allowed to grow beards or ejaculate. Upon reaching manhood, the relationship would be dissolved, and the boy-wife could take a boukonchana of his own if he so desired. These relationships, also known as "mine marriages" as they were common among miners in neighbouring South Africa, continued well into the 1970s. Nevertheless, it was quite common for the numa to also have a heterosexual wife. Lesbian relationships also occurred in the form of motsoalle. This term refers to a committed long-term bond between two women, with various levels of physical intimacy. Over time, motsoalle relationships have begun to disappear in Lesotho.

In 1914, colonial officials tried to stop these practices, but to no avail. By 1941, boukonchana relationships, public cross-dressing and same-sex marriage ceremonies were commonplace in Lesotho and the Basotho community in South Africa. In recent years, however, officials have tried to suppress and censor discussions on this topic. Nowadays, there is widespread denial that these practices ever occurred, and Basotho men possess a strong "macho" reputation where heterosexual promiscuity is widely celebrated.

== Laws regarding same-sex sexual acts ==
In 2012, male same-sex activity was legalized in Lesotho.

Male same-sex activity had previously been illegal in Lesotho as a common law offence, but had not been enforced. Female same-sex sexual activity has never been outlawed.

== Recognition of same-sex relationships ==
Under the Marriage Act No. 10 of 1974 and customary law of Lesotho, marriage is only permitted for opposite-sex couples.

== Discrimination protections ==
The Labour Act 2024 bans discrimination based on sexual orientation. It also states that "gender-based violence and harassment in a workplace” means violence and harassment, including sexual harassment, directed at workers, persons in training, on probation or attachment; applicants for work; managers and supervisors; customers and clients, suppliers or other third-party contractors because of their sex, gender or gender identity or affecting persons of a particular sex, gender or gender identity disproportionately.

Section 127(4) of the Children's Protection and Welfare Act 2011 states that "No child may be unfairly discriminated against on the basis of race, gender, sex, ethnic or social origin, colour, sexual orientation, religion, conscience, belief, culture, language, birth or socio-economic status in the selection of a diversion programme, process or option and all children shall have equal access to diversion options."

Since 2013, the Credit Reporting Regulations states that credit information relating to sexual orientation may not be contained on the records of the credit bureau, except to the extent that such information is self-evident from the record of the consumer’s marital status and list of family members.

== Adoption and parenting ==
The Child Welfare and Protection Act of 2011 governs adoptions in Lesotho. Under the act, only married opposite-sex couples may adopt a child jointly. Single men and same-sex couples are not permitted to adopt.

== Gender identity and expression ==
The National Identity Cards Act 9 of 2011 outlines regulations for national identity cards in Lesotho. Section 8(1) states: "The Director shall take reasonable practicable steps to ensure that personal information entered into the Register is complete, accurate and updated where necessary". This section could be interpreted as allowing transgender people to change their legal gender on their identity documents.

== Living conditions ==
=== Societal discrimination ===
Similarly to other Southern African countries, reports of discrimination, family rejection, violence and harassment against LGBTQ people are not uncommon.

LGBTQ Basotho may face discrimination in employment, access to health care, housing, access to education, and in other areas. As such, many LGBTQ people live secret lives and hide their sexual orientation. Additionally, they are at serious risk from HIV/AIDS infections (Lesotho has the second highest prevalence of HIV in the world, with reportedly 25% of the Basotho population being infected). LGBTQ activists have begun reaching out to HIV-positive people, and offering prevention strategies.

=== Activism ===
On 18 May 2013, the first gay pride march took place in the country. It was held in the city centre of Maseru and was organised by the Matrix Support Group. According to the organisers, the event was very successful, with the authorities being supportive and providing an escort for the participants.

The Matrix Support Group is an LGBTQ NGO. It strives "to build an environment where LGBTQ people can freely express their human rights, and contribute to the social, political and economical development of Lesotho". It was established in 2009 and fully registered with the authorities the following year.

Pride marches and events have been held annually since then, attracting a few hundred people.

=== 2016 United States Department of State report ===
The U.S. Department of State's Country Reports on Human Rights Practices for 2016 stated that:

Acts of Violence, Discrimination, and Other Abuses Based on Sexual Orientation and Gender Identity

The law prohibited consensual sexual relations between men, but authorities did not enforce it. The law is silent on consensual sex between women. Lesbian, gay, bisexual, transgender, and intersex (LGBTI) persons faced societal discrimination and official insensitivity to this discrimination. LGBTI rights groups complained of discrimination in access to health care and participation in religious activities.

The law prohibits discrimination attributable to sex; it does not explicitly forbid discrimination against LGBTI. Matrix, an LGBTI advocacy and support group, had no reports of employment discrimination from its members. Same-sex sexual relationships were taboo in society and not openly discussed. While there were no assaults reported, LGBTI persons often did not report incidents of violence due to fear of stigma.

Matrix operated freely and had members in all 10 districts. It reported having a good working relationship with the LMPS. For instance, in December 2015 the brothers of a woman who identified herself as a lesbian forced her out of her home when they discovered her sexual identity. She took the matter to police, who intervened, and the brothers allowed her to return home.

Matrix engaged in public outreach through film screenings, radio programs, public gatherings, and social media. On 21 May, Matrix organized the third International Day Against Homophobia and Transphobia march. Approximately 200 individuals, mainly family and friends of LGBTI persons, marched peacefully and without incident from Lakeside (city outskirts) to Central Park in Maseru. Matrix representatives noted police officers escorting the march were generally supportive, which they attributed to Matrix's previous outreach efforts to the LMPS. Matrix for several months also had an electronic billboard advertisement in central Maseru supporting LGBTI rights.

Addressing the media in June following the UN General Assembly High-Level Meeting on HIV/AIDS, Deputy Prime Minister Mothetjoa Metsing said the government would look into decriminalizing same-sex relationships to stop the spread of HIV. This was the first pronouncement made by a high-level government official on the issue.

== Summary table ==
Same-sex sexual activity legal	Yes (Since 2012)
Equal age of consent (18)	Yes (Since 2012)
Anti-discrimination laws in employment only	Yes (Since 2024)
Anti-discrimination laws in the provision of goods and services	No
Anti-discrimination laws in all other areas (including indirect discrimination and hate speech)	No
Same-sex civil partnerships	No
Same-sex marriages	No
Recognition of same-sex couples	No
Stepchild adoption by same-sex couples	No
Joint adoption by same-sex couples	No
LGBTQ people allowed to serve openly in the military	No
Right to change legal gender	Yes (Since 1975)
Gender self-identification	No
Legal recognition of non-binary gender	No
Access to IVF for lesbians	No
Commercial surrogacy for gay male couples	No
MSMs allowed to donate blood	No

== See also ==
- Human rights in Lesotho
- LGBTQ rights in Africa
