= LGBTQ rights in Saint Kitts and Nevis =

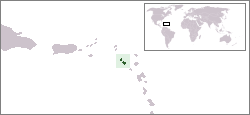
- Saint Kitts and Nevis
- Legal status: Legal since 2022
- Gender identity: no
- Military: yes
- Discrimination protections: None

Family rights
- Recognition of relationships: No recognition of same-sex relationships
- Adoption: None

Lesbian, gay, bisexual, transgender, and queer (LGBTQ) people in Saint Kitts and Nevis face legal challenges not experienced by non-LGBTQIA residents. In 2022, Saint Kitts and Nevis rescinded its criminalization of homosexuality. However, the national penal code does not address discrimination or harassment on the account of sexual orientation or gender identity, nor does the law recognize same sex unions in any form, whether it be marriage or partnerships. Households headed by same-sex couples are also not eligible for any of the same rights given to opposite-sex married couples.

== Legality of same-sex sexual activity ==
Recognition of same-sex unions in the Lesser Antilles and Puerto Rico Same-sex marriage Unregistered cohabitation Island subject to IACHR advisory opinion No recognition of same-sex couples Constitutional ban on same-sex marriage Same-sex sexual activity illegal but penalties not enforced

Following a ruling of the Eastern Caribbean Supreme Court on 29 August 2022, consensual same-sex intercourse between adult males, in private, is no longer illegal in Saint Kitts and Nevis.

Previously, Sections 56 and 57 of the "Offences Against the Person Act" criminalized same-sex sexual activity. The Court ruled that the sections violated the Saint Kitts and Nevis constitutional provisions guaranteeing a right to privacy and freedom of expression. The ruling had immediate effect.

In 2011, the Government of St. Kitts and Nevis said it had “no mandate from the people” to abolish the criminalisation of homosexuality among consenting adults. However, despite the existence of the law on the books, there had been no known prosecution of same-sex sexual activity, according to the government.

== Social conditions ==
On 23 March 2005, the island of Nevis—part of the nation of Saint Kitts and Nevis—barred a cruise ship carrying 110 American passengers, mostly LGBTQ, from docking. A police boat halted the Source Events/Windjammer Barefoot Cruises ship and took the captain to shore for a meeting with port, police, customs and immigration officials, after which the ship was ordered to sail on. Port authority Acting General Manager Oral Brandy told reporters that Nevis does not want homosexuality "to be a part of our culture".

== Summary table ==
Same-sex sexual activity legal	Yes (since 2022)
Equal age of consent (16)	Yes (since 2022)
Anti-discrimination laws in employment only	No
Anti-discrimination laws in the provision of goods and services	No
Anti-discrimination laws in all other areas (Incl. indirect discrimination, hate speech)	No
Same-sex marriages	No
Recognition of same-sex couples	No
Step-child adoption by same-sex couples	No
Joint adoption by same-sex couples	No
Gays and lesbians allowed to serve openly in the military	Yes (since 2022)
Right to change legal gender	
Access to IVF for lesbians	No
Commercial surrogacy for gay male couples	No
MSMs allowed to donate blood	No

== See also ==
- Politics of Saint Kitts and Nevis
- LGBT rights in the Commonwealth of Nations
- LGBT rights in the Americas
- LGBT rights by country or territory
