= LGBTQ rights in Saint Lucia =

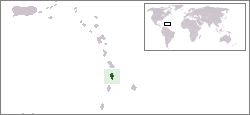
- Saint Lucia
- Legal status: Legal since 2025
- Gender identity: No
- Military: Has no military
- Discrimination protections: Some protections in employment on the basis of sexual orientation

Family rights
- Recognition of relationships: None
- Adoption: No

Lesbian, gay, bisexual, transgender, and queer (LGBTQ) people living in Saint Lucia face some legal challenges not experienced by non-LGBTQ members of the population. Same-sex sexual activity has been legal since July 2025, in accordance with the country's high court.

== Same-sex sexual activity ==
Recognition of same-sex unions in the Lesser Antilles and Puerto Rico Same-sex marriage Unregistered cohabitation Island subject to IACHR advisory opinion No recognition of same-sex couples Constitutional ban on same-sex marriage Same-sex sexual activity illegal but penalties not enforced

Same-sex sexual activity was illegal for males until July 29, 2025, when the Eastern Caribbean Supreme Court struck down colonial-era laws against buggery and gross indecency as unconstitutional.

=== Laws ===
In accordance with the court’s July 2025 ruling, The Criminal Code (No. 9 of 2004; Effective 1 January 2005), was amended to state the following:

Gross Indecency

- Section 132.
  - (1) Any person who commits an act of gross indecency with another person commits an offence and is liable on conviction on indictment to imprisonment for ten years or on summary conviction to five years.
  - (2) Subsection (1) does not apply to an act of gross indecency committed in private between adult persons both of whom consent.
  - (3) For the purposes of subsection (2) —
    - (a) an act shall be deemed not to have been committed in private if it is committed in a public place; and
    - (b) a person shall be deemed not to consent to the commission of such an act if —
      - (i) the consent is extorted by force, threats or fear of bodily harm or is obtained by false and fraudulent representations as to the nature of the act;
      - (ii) the consent is induced by the application or administration of any drug, matter or thing with intent to intoxicate or stupefy the person; or (iii) that person is, and the other party to the act knows or has good reason to believe that the person is suffering from a mental disorder.
  - (4) In this section "gross indecency" is an act other than sexual intercourse (whether natural or unnatural) by a person involving the use of the genital organs for the purpose of arousing or gratifying sexual desire".

Buggery

- Section 133.
  - (1) A person who commits buggery commits an offence and is liable on conviction on indictment to imprisonment for —
    - (a) life, if committed with force and without the consent of the other person;
    - (b) ten years, in any other case.
  - (2) Any person who attempts to commit buggery, or commits an assault with intent to commit buggery, commits an offence and is liable to imprisonment for five years.
  - (3) In this section “buggery” means sexual intercourse per anus by any person with another person except where it occurs in private between consenting persons each of whom is 16 years of age or more.

Before being struck down, these laws were not enforced.

=== Decriminalisation efforts ===
In November 2017, while speaking at the Caribbean Center for Family and Human Rights (CARIFAM) meeting, External Affairs Minister Sarah Flood-Beaubrun has reiterated her position that government "will stick to its decision to refrain from decriminalising buggery and prostitution despite mounting pressure from international countries and organisations."

In February 2019, after the murder by stabbing of a 27-year-old Guyanese Michael Pooran in Saint Lucia, the "Eastern Caribbean Alliance for Diversity and Equality" (ECADE) and "United & Strong" organisations said it is alleged that Pooran's death is due to his perceived sexual orientation. They have urged the government of Saint Lucia to "strongly denounce any forms of violence and discrimination on the basis of sexual orientation, gender identity and expression". and to "encourage the governments of St Lucia and the eastern Caribbean to re-examine the impact of the Buggery and Gross indecency Laws that are widely interpreted as criminalisation of the LGBTQ community".

In March 2019, it was reported that Senator Hermangild Francis, the Justice and National Security Minister and the former Deputy Police Commissioner, supports a review of Saint Lucia's buggery law. He told reporters "If Saint Lucians want that to be revisited I have no problems with that. But I think the time has come when we really have to look at it. Too many young people are being maligned because of their sexual orientation. I don't think that's right. Everyone should be entitled to his or her own sexual, political and religious beliefs. I agree that we should have a review of it. Homosexuality with consenting adults in their privacy – I see no problem, but like I said, everybody is entitled to their opinion and we must respect everybody in that kind of discussion."

In late March 2019, the head of the Catholic Church in Saint Lucia, Archbishop Robert Rivas, has asserted that the church is not against gays or lesbians and has expressed the hope that the governments in the region will 'do what is right' on the matter of the law against buggery. He said: "In some places, it is already removed. If it is a law that is distressing and it is not a law that is serving its purpose the way it ought to have served its purpose in the past, then it has to be reviewed and updated." He added that: "The church is not against gays or lesbians – the church is maybe against the activity where there is a moral issue, but in terms of the person, the church will always love the person and care for the person as Jesus did." and that "Whoever said the church is against [homosexuals] is probably misinformed about the church today, I have never said that in my preaching in Saint Lucia. I've been here eleven years and a bishop for 29 years. I've never preached that, and I've never heard our archdiocese preach that." saying that the time may be right to revisit the island's buggery. Days later, in early April, Superintendent Methodist Minister, Seth Ampadu of the Methodist Church welcomed gays and lesbians, but not their activities. He also said that if the law is going to be reviewed that it should not be reviewed to encourage people to do wrong things.

== Opposition to the UN declaration ==
Saint Lucia was the only UN member in the Americas to formally oppose the UN declaration on sexual orientation and gender identity.

== Discrimination protections ==
Article 131 of the Labour Code, enacted in 2006, bans "unfair dismissal" based on sexual orientation.

The Domestic Violence Act passed on March 8, 2022, extends all its protections to LGBTQ people.

== Living conditions ==
In June 2011, then Minister for Education and Culture, Arsene James, stated his view that there was nothing wrong with having discussions on homosexuality within schools.

In 2011, then Minister for Tourism and Civil Aviation Allen Chastanet apologized to three American gay men who were violently attacked and robbed inside a vacation villa by assailants who called them "faggots", saying: "Whether or not this crime was motivated by anti-gay sentiment, or during the course of a robbery, it is nonetheless unacceptable behavior and Saint Lucia as a destination will not tolerate it … Saint Lucia has always been a safe destination, respectful of people's own choices for religion, beliefs and perspectives on life".

In May 2015, in light of the success of the 2014 human rights sensitisation training which sought to educate the Royal Saint Lucia Police Force on both general and LGBT-specific content, a further training initiative was organised by United and Strong. United and Strong extended its efforts to other law enforcement and community service providers, focusing on officers from the Air and Sea Ports, Customs and Corrections as well as members of civil society who interface with law enforcement on behalf of their community.

In 2017, in an interview, Dominic Fedee, then Minister of Tourism, Tnformation and Broadcasting, reiterated that Saint Lucia welcomes visitors from the LGBT community, saying that the country does not actively seek to attract LGBTQ travellers specifically though everyone is welcome, and that he worked in the hospitality industry for 16 years and they welcomed many gay couples, and that it is a common practice.

In 2017, responding to an article by Pinknews about the situation of LGBT rights in Saint Lucia, Jassica St Rose, Women's Secretariat Representative of the International Lesbian, Gay, Bisexual, Trans and Intersex Association (ILGA) said, "While we do have buggery laws on the statute books, they have not recently been enforced. Moreover, currently no-one is imprisoned in Saint Lucia for being gay. It would have been instructive if "Pink News" had contacted United and Strong or ECADE for comment." Adaryl Williams, of the local LGBT association United and Strong said, "Yes, discriminatory laws exist, however we've had gay cruises and gay couples and people visiting here safely. There are several hotel properties with policies in support of LGBT persons".

In August 2017, LGBT association "United and Strong" welcomed the views expressed by officials of the Catholic Church who believe that gay people should not be discriminated against.

In May 2017, International Day Against Homophobia, Transphobia and Biphobia (IDAHOT) was celebrated at the British High Commission to Saint Lucia with LGBT association United and Strong's members and staff.

In March 2019, the Upper Tribunal decided that gay men are at risk of persecution in St Lucia and can claim asylum in the United Kingdom.

March 2019 saw the suicide of the 17-year-old allegedly openly gay teenager Gervais Emmanuel, because of alleged homophobic bullying and pressure. The suicide reignited conversation on homophobia in Saint Lucia and the poor treatment towards members of the island's LGBTQ community by the general public. A march against bullying took place weeks later in a campaign against bullying in Soufrière where Education Officer for District 8, Shervon Mangroo, made a call to students of Soufrière to denounce bullying in any form or fashion.

In May 2019, the British TV show Blind Date was criticized for sending two bisexual contestants to where same-sex sexual acts were illegal. Jordan Shannon, was paired up with Jesse Drew. The producers of the show said they didn't know that, and although Jesse was anxious about that, Jordan was shocked at first but said it would not be a concern saying after they came back safely to the United Kingdom that: "Regardless, locals were still very helpful and looked after us while we were on our dates".

=== Pride parades ===
The first gay pride parade was scheduled for 23–26 August 2019, with "Persist with pride" as a celebration theme. It included activities aimed at educating and sensitising the general public, as well as nurturing the dignity of LGBT people on Saint Lucia, and public activities included a panel on LGBT in Saint Lucia, and the Family Day and Health Fair, which included health talks and screenings, congratulatory speeches, performances and giveaways. The Pentecostal Assemblies of the West Indies (PAWI) voiced its objection to the pride event, however the Roman Catholic Archbishop Robert Rivas of the Archdiocese of Castries in Saint Lucia said his church was not opposed to the pride event.

== Public opinion ==
=== Same-sex marriage ===
Support for same-sex marriage
| Yes (%) | No (%) |
|---|---|
| 10.7% | 89.3% |
Source: AmericasBarometer, 2016-2017

== Summary table ==
| Same-sex sexual activity legal | Yes (Since 2025) |
| Equal age of consent | Yes (Since 2025) |
| Anti-discrimination laws in employment | Yes / No (Since 2006, only covers sexual orientation) |
| Anti-discrimination laws in the provision of goods and services | No |
| Anti-discrimination laws in all other areas (incl. indirect discrimination, hate speech) | Yes / No (Domestic Violence protections since 2022) |
| Same-sex marriage | No |
| Recognition of same-sex couples | No |
| Step-child adoption by same-sex couples | No |
| Joint adoption by same-sex couples | No |
| Adoption by single people regardless of sexual orientation | (No legal restrictions) |
| Gays and lesbians allowed to serve openly in the military | Has no military |
| Right to change legal gender | No |
| Conversion therapy banned | No |
| Access to IVF for lesbians | No |
| Commercial surrogacy for gay male couples | No |
| MSMs allowed to donate blood | Yes (No restrictions) |

== See also ==
- Politics of Saint Lucia
- LGBT rights in the Commonwealth of Nations
- LGBT rights in La Francophonie
- LGBT rights in the Americas
- LGBT rights by country or territory
