= LGBTQ rights in Saint Vincent and the Grenadines =

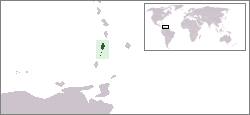
- Saint Vincent and the Grenadines
- Legal status: Illegal
- Penalty: Up to 10 years imprisonment (not enforced, repeal pending)
- Gender identity: No
- Military: Has no military
- Discrimination protections: None

Family rights
- Recognition of relationships: No recognition of same-sex relationships
- Adoption: No

Lesbian, gay, bisexual, transgender, and queer (LGBTQ) people in Saint Vincent and the Grenadines face legal challenges not experienced by non-LGBTQ residents. The Penal Code makes same-sex sexual acts illegal with a punishment up to 10 years in prison, although the law is not enforced. In addition, it outlaws the practice of "buggery" (which is anal and oral sex), whether homosexual or heterosexual and irrespective of whether the act was consensual. The country's laws also do not address discrimination or harassment on account of sexual orientation or gender identity, nor recognize same-sex unions in any form, whether it be marriage or partnerships. Households headed by same-sex couples are not eligible for any of the same rights given to regular married couples. In 2024, Saint Vincent and the Grenadines upheld its constitutional ban on same-sex sexual activity within its High Court.

== Legality of same-sex sexual activity ==
Recognition of same-sex unions in the Lesser Antilles and Puerto Rico Same-sex marriage Unregistered cohabitation Island subject to IACHR advisory opinion No recognition of same-sex couples Constitutional ban on same-sex marriage Same-sex sexual activity illegal but penalties not enforced

Homosexuality is illegal in Saint Vincent and the Grenadines. Section 148 of the Criminal Code states that:

"Any person, who in public or private, commits an act of gross indecency with another person of the same sex, or procures or attempts to procure another person of the same sex to commit an act of gross indecency with him or her, is guilty of an offence and liable to imprisonment for five years."

— Section 148 of the Criminal Code

Section 146 of the 1990 Criminal Code states that:

"Any person who commits buggery with any other person; commits buggery with an animal; or permits any person to commit buggery with him or her; is guilty of an offence and liable to imprisonment for ten years".

— Section 146 of the 1990 Criminal Code

Being gender-neutral, the "buggery" law applies universally to both heterosexual and homosexual conduct. Various reports state that these laws are unenforced.

In May 2019, after being the victim of a transphobic attack in April 2019, a fraud charge against Leswan Stewart, a "cross-dressing gay" teen who was accused of defrauding a man by pretending to be a woman, was withdrawn by the prosecutor who gave no reason for the decision.

=== Decriminalisation efforts ===
In 2018, Human Rights Watch urged Saint Vincent and the Grenadines and other Eastern Caribbean countries to repeal colonial "buggery" laws. In September 2018, following physical attacks on three cross-dressing young men, Prime Minister Ralph Gonsalves said that it is unbecoming and wrong for anyone to physically assault a person based on any prejudice they may have due to his/her sexual orientation. He also condemned the incident and said that such irrational homophobia is entirely unacceptable, and called for an open conversation on homosexuality.

In July 2019, two gay men filed court proceedings to challenge the country's "buggery" and "gross indecency" laws. The two petitioners are unknown to each other. They are Javin Johnson, 22, who successfully claimed asylum in the United Kingdom in 2017, having established that he could not live as a gay man in Saint Vincent and the Grenadines, and Sean Macleish, 53, a Vincentian resident of Chicago in the United States. Macleish has publicly advocated to the Prime Minister for the removal of these laws so that he may return home with his partner, but to no effect. According to their affidavits, as a result of the legislation, they have been exiled from the Caribbean country due to the severely draconian and damaging effects of these laws. The two challenges are expected to be heard together in the High Court of Saint Vincent and the Grenadines in the capital Kingstown. The British Privy Council in London may have ultimate say on these laws. A 2024 court finding affirmed that it was legal to outlaw homosexual activity.

Commenting on these legal challenges, the Prime Minister of Saint Vincent and the Grenadines, Ralph Gonsalves, said "whatever happens here (in St Vincent and the Grenadines), it would be an OECS (Organisation of Eastern Caribbean States) decision... so it would apply, because all the legal provisions the constitutional provisions are similar and the legislation is basically similar. And if the legislation is unconstitutional here... it would be unconstitutional in other member states".

== Living conditions ==
LGBTQ life in Saint Vincent and the Grenadines is invisible and stigmatised. There are no associations or organisations dedicated to LGBTQ people, nor any sort of helpline or help centre for LGBTQ youth.

In September 2011, a same-sex couple went public with their relationship, writing a short article in the Vinci Kallaloo, entitled "Introduction: Not Easy Being Gay in St. Vincent and the Grenadines". The article received unprecedented attention, with over 3,400 hits in less than a day and over 50 comments, the third-highest of any article for the newspaper at the time. Several of the comments involved violent murderous threats (Saint Vincent and the Grenadines has one of the highest homicide rates in the world).

In 2011, three lecturers at the St. Vincent and the Grenadines Community College were the victims of an orchestrated scheme by the college's director, who accused them of having "homosexual tendencies". A posting in the Vinci Kallaloo accuses the director of starting the rumour in an effort to fire the lecturers and rid the college of any partisan opponents, as the lecturers were either supporters of the opposition New Democratic Party or had not expressed any particular political position.

== Summary table ==
Status of LGBTQ rights in Saint Vincent and the Grenadines
Same-sex sexual activity legal	No (Penalty: Up to 10 years' imprisonment; not enforced, repeal pending)
Equal age of consent	No
Anti-discrimination laws in employment only	No
Anti-discrimination laws in the provision of goods and services	No
Anti-discrimination laws in all other areas (Incl. indirect discrimination, hate speech)	No
Same-sex marriages	No
Recognition of same-sex couples	No
Stepchild adoption by same-sex couples	No
Joint adoption by same-sex couples	No
LGBTQ people allowed to serve openly in the military	Has no military
Right to change legal gender	No
Access to IVF for lesbians	No
Commercial surrogacy for gay male couples	No
MSMs allowed to donate blood	No

== See also ==
- Human rights in Saint Vincent and the Grenadines
- LGBT rights in the Americas
