= LGBTQ rights in Montserrat =

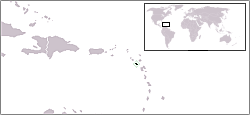
- Montserrat
- Legal Status: Legal since 2001; unequal age of consent
- Gender identity: No
- Military: Yes
- Discrimination protections: Yes, sexual orientation only

Family rights
- Recognition of relationships: No recognition of same-sex couples
- Restrictions: Same-sex marriage constitutionally banned since 2010
- Adoption: No

Lesbian, gay, bisexual, and transgender (LGBT) persons in Montserrat face legal challenges not experienced by non-LGBTQ residents. Same-sex sexual activity has been legal in Montserrat since 2001.

== Law regarding same-sex sexual activity ==
Before 2001, anal sex and oral sex for both heterosexuals and male homosexuals were criminal offences. Lesbian activity has never been illegal in Montserrat. Sexual acts between two consenting adults in private were expressly decriminalised by an Order in Council in Montserrat (and other British Overseas Territories) by the British Government pursuant to Sections 3(1) and 3(7) of the Caribbean Territories (Criminal Law) Order, 2000. According to section 4 of the order, the law was passed retrospectively. There are two exceptions to the law: group sex and sex in public remain criminal offences and may also lead to charges under gross indecency and other minor sexual offence laws.

The age of consent is higher for homosexuals (18) than it is for heterosexuals (16).

As a British Overseas Territory, Montserrat is required to comply with its obligations under international human rights instruments. Specifically, this includes an adherence to the European Convention on Human Rights, which highlights a responsibility to ensure non-discrimination and equality.

== Recognition of same-sex relationships ==
Recognition of same-sex unions in the Lesser Antilles and Puerto Rico Same-sex marriage Unregistered cohabitation Island subject to IACHR advisory opinion No recognition of same-sex couples Constitutional ban on same-sex marriage Same-sex sexual activity illegal but penalties not enforced

Same-sex marriage and civil unions are not legal in Montserrat. Only opposite-sex marriage is constitutionally protected as Article 10 (1) of the Constitution reads:

Notwithstanding anything in section 16, every man and woman of marriageable age (as determined by or under any law) has the right to marry a person of the opposite sex and to found a family.

== Discrimination protections ==
Article 16 of the Montserrat Constitution and Article 79 of the Labour Code ban discrimination based on sexual orientation:

The expression "discriminatory" means affording different treatment to different persons on any ground such as sex, sexual orientation, race, colour, language, religion, political or other opinion, national or social origin, association with a national minority, property, birth or other status.

== Living conditions ==
The gay scene is very limited. There are no gay bars, nightclubs or venues in Montserrat, though several hotels welcome gay tourists and have non-discrimination policies.

While Montserrat society tends to be tolerant of same-sex relationships, open displays of affection between same-sex partners may offend.

== Summary table ==
Same-sex sexual activity legal	Yes (Since 2001)
Equal age of consent	No (Pending)
Anti-discrimination laws in employment	Yes (Since 2010)
Anti-discrimination laws in the provision of goods and services	Yes (Since 2010)
Anti-discrimination laws in all other areas (incl. indirect discrimination, hate speech)	Yes (Since 2010)
Same-sex marriages	No
Recognition of same-sex couples	No
Stepchild adoption by same-sex couples	No
Joint adoption by same-sex couples	No
LGBT people allowed to serve openly in the military	Yes (Since 2000; responsibility of the United Kingdom)
Right to change legal gender	No
Access to IVF for lesbians	No
Commercial surrogacy for gay male couples	No (Banned for heterosexual couples as well)
MSMs allowed to donate blood	No

== See also ==
- Politics of Montserrat
- British overseas territories
- LGBTQ rights in the Commonwealth of Nations
- LGBTQ rights in the Americas
- LGBTQ rights by country or territory
- Recognition of same-sex unions in the British Overseas Territories
