= LGBTQ rights in the Turks and Caicos Islands =

LGBTQ rights in Turks and Caicos Islands
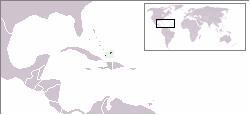
- Turks and Caicos Islands
- Legal status: Legal since 2001, unequal age of consent
- Gender identity: Yes/No, gender identity change is not recognized for the purpose of inheritance of hereditary peerages and baronetcies, which is subject to Section 16 of the United Kingdom's Gender Recognition Act 2004.
- Military: Yes
- Discrimination protections: Yes, sexual orientation only

Family rights
- Recognition of relationships: Recognition of same-sex couples for immigration purposes only since 2025
- Adoption: No

Lesbian, gay, bisexual, transgender and queer (LGBT) people in the British Overseas Territory of the Turks and Caicos Islands face legal challenges not experienced by non-LGBTQ residents. Same-sex sexual activity has been legal in the Turks and Caicos Islands since 2001, and discrimination based on sexual orientation is constitutionally banned.

== Legality of same-sex sexual activity ==
Same-sex sexual acts were expressly decriminalised under the United Kingdom's Caribbean Territories (Criminal Law) Order, 2000, which took effect on 1 January 2001.

The law received considerable local media coverage. The two largest newspapers (one of each belongs to the two largest political parties) described the law as "an affront to our country" and "the sissy law".

The age of consent is higher for male (18) than it is for female (16).

== Recognition of same-sex relationships ==
Homosexuality laws in Central America and the Caribbean Islands. Same-sex marriage Other type of partnership Unregistered cohabitation No recognition of same-sex couples Constitution limits marriage to opposite-sex couples Same-sex sexual activity illegal but law not enforced

Same-sex marriages and civil unions are not legal in the Turks and Caicos Islands. Only opposite-sex marriage is constitutionally protected as Article 10 of the Constitution reads:

Every unmarried man and woman of marriageable age (as determined by or under any law) has the right to marry a person of the opposite sex and found a family.
On October 27, 2025, the Court of Appeal ruled that the government must interpret the term "spouse" in the Immigration Act to include same-sex partners legally married in other jurisdictions, finding that it could not discriminate based on sexual orientation. This is the first time the courts have found an obligation to recognize same-sex partners.

== Discrimination protections ==
Article 16 of the Constitution bans discrimination based on sexual orientation:

In this section, "discriminatory" means affording different treatment to different persons attributable wholly or mainly to their respective descriptions such as by race, national or social origin, political or other opinion, colour, religion, language, creed, association with a national minority, property, sex, sexual orientation, birth or other status whereby persons of one such description are subjected to disabilities or restrictions to which persons of another such description are not made subject or are accorded privileges or advantages which are not accorded to persons of another such description.

== Living conditions ==
The Turks and Caicos Islands are considered a safe destination for LGBT tourists. LGBT people tend to face no discrimination issues in resorts and very touristic areas. Most Turks and Caicos inhabitants are quite tolerant of same-sex relationships. Several gay-themed cruise ships have also been allowed to port in the islands.

There are no known gay rights organisations in the Turks and Caicos Islands. Several government education programmes on HIV/AIDS have reached out to gay men, though.

Homophobia in the Turks and Caicos Islands is mostly religious-based. Following the passage of Proposition 8 in California, several religious preachers called on same-sex marriage to be constitutionally banned in island law. Religious groups have also opposed greater awareness and prevention of HIV/AIDS, erroneously claiming that straight men and women cannot get infected.

== Summary table ==
Same-sex sexual activity legal	Yes (Since 2001)
Equal age of consent	No (Proposed)
Anti-discrimination laws in employment	Yes (Since 2011)
Anti-discrimination laws in the provision of goods and services	Yes (Since 2011)
Anti-discrimination laws in all other areas (incl. indirect discrimination, hate speech)	Yes (Since 2011)
Same-sex marriages	No
Recognition of same-sex couples	No / Yes (Since 2025, for immigration purposes only)
Stepchild adoption by same-sex couples	No
Joint adoption by same-sex couples	No
LGBT people allowed to serve openly in the military	Yes (UK responsible for defence)
Right to change legal gender	Yes / No Gender identity change is not recognized for the purpose of inheritance of hereditary peerages and baronetcies, which is subject to Section 16 of the United Kingdom's Gender Recognition Act 2004.
Access to IVF for lesbians	No
Commercial surrogacy for gay male couples	No (Banned for heterosexual couples as well)
MSMs allowed to donate blood	No

== See also ==
- Politics of the Turks and Caicos Islands
- British overseas territories
- LGBTQ rights in the Commonwealth of Nations
- LGBTQ rights in the Americas
- LGBTQ rights by country or territory
- LGBTQ rights in the United Kingdom
- Recognition of same-sex unions in the British Overseas Territories
