= LGBTQ rights in Anguilla =

- Location of LGBTQ rights in Anguilla (red) in North America (grey) – [Legend]
- Legal status: Legal since 2001; unequal age of consent
- Gender identity: No
- Military: Yes
- Discrimination protections: None

Family rights
- Recognition of relationships: No recognition of same-sex couples
- Adoption: No

Lesbian, gay, bisexual, and transgender (LGBT) persons in Anguilla face legal challenges not experienced by non-LGBTQ residents. Same-sex sexual activity is legal in Anguilla, but same-sex couples cannot marry or obtain civil partnerships. Anguillian law does not forbid discrimination based on sexual orientation or gender identity.

== Law regarding same-sex sexual activity ==
Same-sex sexual activities have been legal in Anguilla since 2001. The legalisation of homosexuality was the result of an order of the Privy Council of the United Kingdom and affected the laws in four other overseas territories of the United Kingdom.

The age of consent is higher for homosexuals (18) than it is for heterosexuals (16).

== Recognition of same-sex relationships ==
Recognition of same-sex unions in the Lesser Antilles and Puerto Rico Same-sex marriage Unregistered cohabitation Island subject to IACHR advisory opinion No recognition of same-sex couples Constitutional ban on same-sex marriage Same-sex sexual activity illegal but penalties not enforced

Same-sex marriage and civil unions are not legal in Anguilla, and it is one of the British overseas territories not to have legislated for civil partnerships. Non-legal ceremonies of same-sex couples have occurred on the island.

The Marriage Act states that "'marriage' means the union of a man and a woman as husband and wife".

== Discrimination protections ==
No known legislative protections exist for LGBT people in Anguilla's local laws. The Constitution of Anguilla outlaws discrimination on the basis of "race, political opinions, colour, creed, sex or place of origin", though makes no mention of sexual orientation or gender identity.

== Living conditions ==
Due to Anguilla's small population, there is virtually no gay scene on the island. There are no gay organisations, venues, bars and clubs, or pride events. A small protest occurred on 17 May 2011 in The Valley for the International Day Against Homophobia, Transphobia and Biphobia.

Several same-sex couples who have travelled to the island on vacation report that the island is "gay-friendly" and has "warm people, the best beaches and sunset in the world, and fantastic restaurants", but also "very quiet". The couples further said that "nobody was discriminatory in any way". However, the situation for locals might be different. Anguilla, much like other Caribbean islands, is believed to have a "subdued and subtle climate of homophobia", which has contributed to secrecy among LGBT locals.

== Summary table ==
Same-sex sexual activity legal	Yes (Since 2001)
Equal age of consent	No
Anti-discrimination laws in employment	No
Anti-discrimination laws in the provision of goods and services	No
Anti-discrimination laws in all other areas (incl. indirect discrimination, hate speech)	No
Same-sex marriage	No
Recognition of same-sex couples	No
Stepchild adoption by same-sex couples	No
Joint adoption by same-sex couples	No
LGBT people allowed to serve openly in the military	Yes (UK responsible for defence)
Right to change legal gender	No
Access to IVF for lesbians and automatic parenthood for both spouses after birth	
Commercial surrogacy for gay male couples	No (Banned for heterosexual couples as well)
MSMs allowed to donate blood	

== See also ==
- LGBTQ rights in the Americas
- LGBTQ rights in the United Kingdom
- Recognition of same-sex unions in the British Overseas Territories
