= LGBTQ rights in Jamaica =

- Jamaica
- Legal status: Illegal
- Penalty: Up to 10 years imprisonment with hard labour
- Gender identity: No
- Military: No
- Discrimination protections: No

Family rights
- Recognition of relationships: None
- Restrictions: Same-sex marriage has been constitutionally banned since 2011
- Adoption: No

Lesbian, gay, bisexual, transgender, and queer (LGBTQ) people in Jamaica face legal and social issues not experienced by heterosexual and cisgender citizens. Consensual sexual intercourse between same-sex partners is legally punishable by up to 10 years of imprisonment in the country.

Jamaica has long held strongly conservative views towards homosexuality, with polls from 2023 stating that the majority of Jamaicans, at least 60%, are against the acceptance of homosexuality. Most of the population is affiliated with Christianity and the Rastafari movement, which have both encouraged negative feelings towards homosexuality. Discrimination and violence against LGBTQ persons are very common and LGBTQ people in Jamaica often remain closeted to avoid discrimination or harassment. In 2006, Time magazine labelled Jamaica "the most homophobic place on Earth", and in 2013 the majority of LGBTQ people in the country said they were subject to homophobic violence in public.

The government of Jamaica said in 2012 that it "is committed to the equal and fair treatment of its citizens and affirms that any individual whose rights are alleged to have been infringed has a right to seek redress." The government also claimed that "there is no legal discrimination against persons on the grounds of their sexual orientation" though there is widespread homophobia and a sodomy law (The Offenses Against the Person Act of 1864) that is still in effect.

== Laws, policies, and the Jamaican constitution ==
Homosexuality laws in Central America and the Caribbean Islands. Same-sex marriage Other type of partnership Unregistered cohabitation No recognition of same-sex couples Constitution limits marriage to opposite-sex couples Same-sex sexual activity illegal but law not enforced

=== History of the criminalization of LGBT individuals ===
Islands in the Commonwealth Caribbean adopted British buggery laws; however these laws were not as strictly regulated in the Caribbean as they were in the United Kingdom up until the Victorian era. Prior to this era, recounts were made of the island's British occupants engaging in sodomy, which may correlate with the fact that the first colonists were mostly men. The slave communities in Jamaica and the rest of the British Caribbean were made up of men and women from West Africa, the men being more sought after by slave owners. In England, the Buggery Law of 1861 was liberalized in 1967. By this point, Jamaica had already gained its independence in 1962, and thus its buggery law adopted from the British constitution, remained intact and is still in force to this day.

=== Laws against same-sex sexual activity: The Offences Against the Person Act (1864) ===
Jamaica's laws criminalize the status of being LGBTQ and criminalizes associated homosexual conduct, including anal sex, oral sex and any sex between 2 men or 2 women. The Offences Against the Person Act (OAPA) provides as follows:

Section 76. Unnatural Offences. Whosoever shall be convicted of the abominable crime of buggery, committed either with mankind or with any animal, shall be liable to be imprisoned and kept to hard labour for a term not exceeding ten years.

Section 77. Attempt. Whosoever shall attempt to commit the said abominable crime, or shall be guilty of any assault with intent to commit the same, or of any indecent assault upon any male person, shall be guilty of a misdemeanor, and being convicted thereof, shall be liable to be imprisoned for a term not exceeding seven years, with or without hard labour.

Section 79. Outrages on decency. Any male person who, in public or private, commits, or is a party to the commission of, or procures or attempts to procure the commission by any male person of, any act of gross indecency with another male person, shall be guilty of a misdemeanor, and being convicted thereof shall be liable at the discretion of the court to be imprisoned for a term not exceeding two years, with or without hard labour.

"Gross indecency" is not defined by the OAPA but has been interpreted as "referring to any kind of physical intimacy", including merely holding hands.

According to Human Rights Watch, regardless of how often persons are convicted of buggery or gross indecency, "the arrests themselves send a message." The Jamaican press publishes the names of men arrested for those crimes, "shaming them and putting them at risk of physical injury." The gross indecency law in Section 79 made LGBT persons "vulnerable to extortion from Neighbours who threatened to report them to the police as part of blackmailing schemes."

Section 80. Other matters. Any constable may take into custody, without a warrant, any person whom he shall find lying or loitering in any highway, yard, or other place during the night, that is to say the interval between 7 o'clock in the evening and 6 o'clock in the morning of the next succeeding day, and whom he shall have good cause to suspect of having committed, or being about to commit any felony in this Act mentioned, and shall take such person, as soon as reasonably may be, before a Justice, to be dealt with according to law.

Police have great discretion in detaining individuals under Section 80. This and other laws are used by police to detain LGBT men and women who are engaged in sodomy or other sexual acts or forms of intimacy with another man or women.

=== Decriminalization efforts ===
The European Parliament in 2005 passed a resolution calling on Jamaica to repeal its "antiquated and discriminatory sodomy laws and to actively combat widespread homophobia". Following Jamaican Prime Minister Portia Simpson's pledge that "no one should be discriminated against because of their sexual orientation", and that the government will seek a review of the buggery law (which did not happen), LGBT rights campaigner Maurice Tomlinson filed a case against Jamaica at the Inter-American Commission on Human Rights in February 2012. He had fled the country because of death threats after news about his marriage to his partner Tom Decker in Canada reached the local media. In February 2013, AIDS-Free World filed a legal complaint with the Jamaica Supreme Court on behalf of Javed Jaghai, who said his landlord kicked him out of his home because of his sexual orientation. In June 2013, the court began hearing the case. In August 2014, he was forced to withdraw his lawsuit, citing death threats and concerns for his personal safety and that of his family.

In November 2015, LGBT activist Tomlinson filed another lawsuit with the Jamaican Supreme Court challenging the constitutionality of Jamaica's laws criminalizing consensual sex between men, saying that the colonial-era statute violates several provisions of the Jamaican constitution, including the right to privacy. He also argues the sodomy law violates “the right to protection from inhuman or degrading punishment or other treatment.” The legal challenge is being supported by the Canadian HIV/AIDS Legal Network and AIDS-Free World. In February 2016, the court held a first hearing of the constitutional challenge. The Public Defender (PD) Arlene Harrison Henry applied to be joined as interested parties. It was adjourned to 26 April 2016 when the applications by the various parties were heard. In July 2016, the court blocked Henry from participating in the suit, and as a result, she sought leave to appeal the denial of participation to the court of appeal. The Supreme Court suspended the hearing of the case pending the decision of the Appeal Court. After a two-year delay, the Court of Appeal upheld the Supreme Court ruling barring Henry from joining Tomlinson in the lawsuit, leaving him alone in the case. A preliminary hearing was held attempting to block Tomlinson from making a Charter of Rights argument. The judge determined in 2022 that the issues could not be separated. There is no date set for the main hearing.

In 2012, a gay man named Gareth Henry and a lesbian woman, Simone Edwards, filed complaints at the Inter-American Commission on Human Rights. The two members of Jamaica's LGBT community have put themselves forward as petitioners in the case. Both claim they fled Jamaica because of those laws. Gareth Henry sought asylum in Canada in 2008 after enduring repeated attacks by homophobic gangs and police brutality, and said he was forced to flee Jamaica in fear of his life. Simone Edwards fled Jamaica and was granted asylum in the Netherlands in 2008 after two men in a homophobic gang fired shots at her house. They also tried to kill her two brothers, one of whom is gay. Six years later, in July 2018, The Inter-American Commission on Human Rights announced it would review whether it could make a case to challenge Jamaica's anti-buggery laws.

The IACHR in its report setting out the decision, acknowledged the victims' concerns about "violence and discrimination against LGBT people and the impact of buggery laws,” and noted that, “if proved, the alleged facts relating to threats to life, personal integrity, interference with private and family life, obstacles to the right of residence and movement, unequal treatment, lack of access to justice and judicial protection, and interference in access to health care, could establish possible violations of (…) the American Convention [on Human Rights]”. The Government of Jamaica has objected to the admissibility of the Petition and defended its anti-gay laws. The case remains pending, as of 2023. In December 2018, a Jamaican parliamentary committee recommended holding a national referendum on repealing the country's anti-sodomy law. The recommendation was criticized by LGBT activists, who felt a referendum was not needed and that people should "stay out of gays' bedrooms".

=== Efforts to increase criminal penalties ===
In 2009, Ernest Smith, a Labour Party member of Parliament, stated during a parliamentary debate that "homosexual activities seem to have taken over" Jamaica, described homosexuals as "abusive" and "violent", and called for a stricter law outlawing homosexual conduct between men that would impose sentences of up to life in prison.

=== Absence of laws protecting LGBT people from discrimination ===
The Civil Service Staff Orders of 2004 (which have the force of law) protect Jamaican civil servants from discrimination on the grounds of sexual orientation. According to the Inter-American Commission on Human Rights, Jamaica has "no law which prevents discrimination against an individual on the basis of his or her or their sexual orientation, gender identity, or gender expression. There is no legislation addressing hate crimes in Jamaica."

=== Jamaican Charter Of Rights ===
In 2011, a national Bill of Rights was formally added to the Jamaican Constitution (Chapter 3). While it does guarantee all citizens numerous civil and political rights, it pointedly stipulates that the charter does not invalidate laws dealing with sexual offenses, pornography, or "the traditional definition of marriage".

== Recognition of same-sex relationships ==
In 2011, the Parliament passed The Charter of Fundamental Rights and Freedoms (Constitutional Amendment) Act, 2011 which explicitly banned same-sex marriage and any other kind of union to be recognized in Jamaica. In 2019, both Prime Minister Andrew Holness of the Jamaica Labour Party and the Leader of the Opposition Peter Phillips of the People's National Party announced their opposition to the legalization of same-sex marriage. In July 2019, after previously speaking out and filing several lawsuits against Jamaica's homophobic laws, Maurice Tomlinson petitioned the Inter-American Commission on Human Rights (IACHR), requesting that it rule that Section 18 (2) of the Constitution of Jamaica, which does not recognize same-sex marriages, contravenes various articles of the American Convention on Human Rights ratified by Jamaica. He argues that because the Jamaican constitution does not recognize same-sex marriage, he and his husband Tom Decker are unable to enjoy the benefits and protections afforded to them. Tomlinson wants to return to Jamaica with his Canadian husband in order to work and look after his ageing parents who are in rapidly declining health. The petition also says that by virtue of this constitutional ban against non-heterosexual unions, there is neither an adequate nor effective domestic remedy available to him and/or his same-sex husband under Jamaican law. It also outlined several instances in which persons believed to be members of the LGBT community had been killed. He is asking the IACHR to require Jamaica to fulfil its human-rights obligations under the convention and to recommend that the government repeal Section 18 (2) of the Constitution of Jamaica in order to comply with the country's obligations under the convention. Further, he wants the IACHR to recommend that the government allow the naturalization of same-sex spouses of Jamaican citizens on the same conditions as heterosexual spouses of Jamaican citizens. He also wants the Jamaican government to condemn and monitor serious human-rights violations, including discrimination and hate speech, as well as incitement to violence and hatred. A letter dated July 18, 2019, has subsequently been sent to Ambassador Audrey Marks, permanent representative of Jamaica to the Organization of American States, requesting a government response to the petition in three months.

== Jamaican political parties ==
Neither one of the two major political parties in Jamaica has expressed any official support for legal rights for its LGBT citizens. However, at a televised debate in late December 2011 between opposition leader (and former prime minister) Portia Simpson-Miller of the People's National Party (PNP) and then-Prime Minister Andrew Holness, Simpson-Miller said she would consider appointing anyone she felt was most qualified for her cabinet, regardless of sexual orientation, and added that she wanted to see conscience votes allowed by the major parties on LGBT rights issues in parliament. Although Simpson-Miller was criticized by some social conservatives for her stance, it did not affect the PNP's sweeping election victory days later.

During the 2001 elections, the Jamaican Labour Party adopted "Chi Chi Man" by T.O.K., controversial for its lyrics which promote the murder of gays, as its theme song. In April 2006, then-opposition leader and future prime minister Bruce Golding vowed that "homosexuals would find no solace in any cabinet formed by him". Two years later, when asked if LGBT people could be in the cabinet, he said, "Sure they can be in the cabinet - but not mine." The conservative National Democratic Movement opposes LGBT rights on religious grounds, alongside the more leftist economic parties such as the People's National Party and the New Nation Coalition.

== Public opinion ==
A poll in 2001 indicated that 96 percent of Jamaicans were opposed to any move that would seek to legalize homosexual relations.

In 2008, a poll of 1,008 Jamaicans was conducted that read, "Whether or not you agree with their lifestyle, do you think homosexuals are entitled to the same basic rights and privileges as other people in Jamaica?" 26 percent said "yes", 70 percent said "no", and 4 percent did not know.

Results from the "National Survey of Attitudes and Perceptions of Jamaicans Towards Same Sex Relationships" were published in 2011. Based on a random survey in late 2010 of 1,007 Jamaicans, aged 18–84, 85.2 percent were opposed to legalizing homosexuality among consenting adults. In addition, 82.2 percent said that male homosexuality was immoral, 75.2 percent believed that female homosexuality was immoral, and 75.3 percent believed that bisexual relationships were immoral.

In 2012, a poll indicated that about a third of the population — over 900,000 Jamaicans — believe the government is not doing enough to protect LGBT people from violence and discrimination.

In a 2016 poll from J-Flag, 88 percent of those polled that that they disapproved of homosexuality.

== LGBT rights movement in Jamaica ==
=== Organizations ===
==== J-FLAG ====
J-FLAG, the Jamaican Forum for Lesbians, All-Sexuals and Gays, was founded in December 1998, and operates underground and anonymously. It is the first LGBT human rights organization in Jamaican history, and its primary efforts include legal reform and advocacy, public education, crisis intervention, and support programs.

==== Quality of Citizenship Jamaica ====
Quality of Citizenship Jamaica (QCJ), founded by Jalna Broderick and Angeline Jackson in 2013, was an organization that worked toward creating safe spaces to empower the LGBT community. Its primary goal was to improve the lives of lesbian and bisexual women as well as transgender individuals, and part of the organization's vision was to enhance the healthcare opportunities for LGBT women and youth, specifically regarding mental health and HIV/AIDS awareness. In his visit to the University of the West Indies in Kingston, United States president Barack Obama stated about Jackson,

Instead of remaining silent, she chose to speak out and started her own organization to advocate for women like her, and get them treatment and get them justice, and push back against stereotypes, and give them some sense of their own power.

QCJ ended operations in 2018.

=== Important people ===
==== Brian Williamson ====
One of the best-known Jamaican gay rights activities and co-founder of J-FLAG. He was one of the first publicly out gay figures in Jamaica, while the rest of J-FLAG was still operating as an underground organization.

In June 2004, he was murdered. He was set to have an interview with a researcher from Human Rights Watch the same day. The researcher witnessed a crowd outside his home celebrating the murder and chanting slurs.

==== Maurice Tomlinson ====
Maurice Tomlinson, Toronto-based lawyer and gay rights activist from Jamaica, has spoken out numerous times against homophobia in the region.

Maurice Tomlinson is a Jamaican lawyer, law professor, and gay rights activist currently living in Toronto, Ontario, Canada. In 2011, the Jamaica Observer, a local newspaper published an article with a photograph of him with his Canadian husband during their wedding ceremony. After the article was published, Tomlinson began receiving death threats and moved to Toronto. On 27 November 2015, he filed a Jamaican Supreme Court case challenging the nation's sodomy law. He stated in the court filings, "the laws of Jamaica that criminalise consensual sexual intimacy between men essentially render me an un-apprehended criminal." He says that the 1864 law was worsened when the requirement of the convicted to carry offender identification was added in 2011, punishable by an additional twelve months in prison and a one million dollar fine. He argues that the law as a whole encourages violence, and in a blogpost for Human Rights First in January, 2016, he stated the following:

I filed a constitutional challenge against Jamaica’s sodomy law, citing the law’s violation of the protections outlined in Jamaica’s Charter of Fundamental Rights and Freedoms. These include the rights to liberty and freedom of the person, freedom of expression, privacy and family life, and freedom from inhuman or degrading punishment or other treatment, among others.

Since then, Tomlison has continued to speak out against homophobia in Jamaica.

==== Dr. J. Carolyn Gomes ====
Carolyn Gomes is currently the executive director of the Caribbean Vulnerable Communities Coalition (CVC), which works with Caribbean populations who are particularly vulnerable to HIV/AIDS and have social and financial barriers barring them from treatment and aid. Prior to assuming this role in January 2014, Gomes served as executive director of Jamaicans for Justice (JFJ), which she founded in Kingston in 1999 in order to fill the gap needed in Jamaica for a citizens' rights action group that works towards eradicating corruption in the judicial system and the public sphere as well as imbalances in the socio-economic system. She resigned from JFJ in 2013 after nationwide pushback on the sexual education leaflets the organization produced for adolescents, due to their mentioning of anal sex. She speaks out on LGBT issues as they relate to her organization and in part due to the fact that her sister is a homosexual woman.

==== Nicolette Bryan ====
Nicolette Bryan is a lesbian Jamaican woman who is a co-founder of Women's Empowerment for Change (WE-Change) and has been serving as the executive director since November 2017, upon her return from the United Kingdom as a Chevening Scholar. She is one of the more notable young women's rights activists in the country and can be credited with being an instrumental in the abortion reform movement currently ongoing in Jamaica.

=== International opinion ===
The Inter-American Commission on Human Rights in 2012 said that "discrimination based on sexual orientation, gender identity, and gender expression is widespread throughout Jamaica, and ... discrimination against those in the lesbian, gay, bisexual, trans, and intersex ... communities is entrenched in Jamaican State institutions. Those who are not heterosexual or cisgender face political and legal stigmatization, police violence, an inability to access the justice system, as well as intimidation, violence, and pressure in their homes and communities." Human Rights Watch said in 2012 that because of homophobia, "human rights defenders advocating the rights of LGBT people are not safe in Jamaica".

==== United Nations ====
A Universal Periodic Review (UPR) of Jamaica was completed in 2011 under the auspices of the United Nations Human Rights Council. In its report,

Jamaica stressed that, although consensual sex between adult males remained proscribed by law, there was no legal discrimination against persons on the grounds of their sexual orientation. Jamaica pointed out that Jamaican law did not criminalize lesbian, gay, bisexual and transgender orientation, nor did the Government condone discrimination or violence against lesbian, gay, bisexual and transgender persons. It added that there had been no credible cases of arbitrary detention and/or harassment of such persons by the police, nor was there any such official policy. Likewise, there was no evidence of any mob-related killing of lesbian, gay, bisexual or transgender persons. Jamaica stressed that the issue of male homosexuality was one of great sensitivity in Jamaican society, in which cultural norms, values, religious and moral standards underlay a rejection of male homosexual behavior by a large majority of Jamaicans; and that the Government was committed to ensuring that all citizens were protected from violence.

During the UPR working group meeting, Australia encouraged Jamaica to repeal its laws against same-sex activities and condemn homophobic statements made by public figures. The Netherlands expressed concern about harassment of LGBT persons and stated that legislation criminalizing consensual same-sex activities might contribute to the problem. The United States "remained concerned about continuing discrimination, violence and exploitation, especially against the lesbian, gay, bisexual, and transgender community."

Slovenia stated that the abuse and harassment of LGBT persons by law enforcement officials were "highly worrisome". The United Kingdom encouraged Jamaica to promote tolerance and end discrimination against LGBT persons. Sweden expressed concern about the criminalization of consensual sex between men and inquired about whether there were initiatives to decriminalize it.

Jamaica refused to support the recommendations made about LGBT rights. "In response to questions regarding sexual orientation, Jamaica ... noted that sexual orientation was not criminalized, only a specific act. Jamaica stated that it was aware of existing concerns and observed that this was a sensitive issue." In addition, "Jamaica explained that the government has raised public awareness" about sexual orientation and discrimination and "will continue to do so, but that this needed resources."

== Living conditions ==
=== Anti-LGBT violence ===
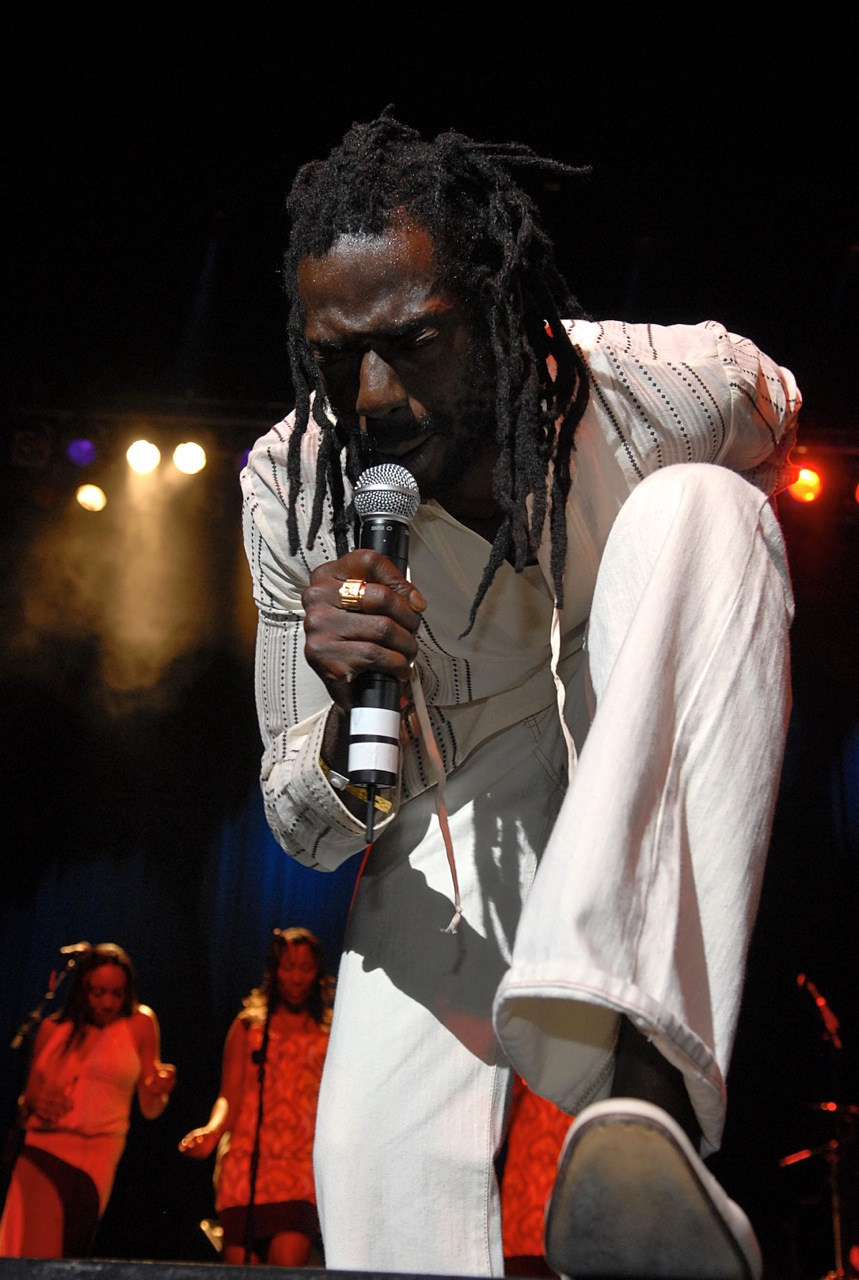
Jamaican musician Buju Banton has attracted criticism over lyrics supporting the murder of gay men.

Human rights non-governmental organizations and governmental entities have agreed that violence against LGBT people, primarily by private citizens, was widespread in 2012. The Jamaican Forum for Lesbians, All-Sexuals and Gays (J-FLAG) in 2012 "continued to report serious human rights abuses, including assault with deadly weapons, 'corrective rape' of women accused of being lesbians, arbitrary detention, mob attacks, stabbings, harassment of gay and lesbian patients by hospital and prison staff, and targeted shootings of such persons."

According to the Bureau of Democracy for Human Rights and Labor at the U.S. Department of State, "Police often did not investigate such incidents. During 2012, J-FLAG received 68 reports of sexually motivated harassment or abuse, which included 53 cases of attempted or actual assault, including at least two killings, and 15 reports of displacements. J-FLAG data showed that young people, ages 18 to 29, continued to bear the brunt of violence based on sexual orientation." In Jamaican prisons, there were numerous reports in 2012 of violence against gay inmates, perpetrated by wardens and other inmates, but few inmates sought recourse through the prison system.

Amnesty International has "received many reports of vigilante action against gay people by members of the community, and of ill-treatment or torture by the police. Gay men and lesbian women have been beaten, cut, burned, raped and shot on account of their sexuality. ... We are concerned that these reports are just the tip of the iceberg. Many gay men and women in Jamaica are too afraid to go to the authorities and seek help." This violence has prompted many gay persons to emigrate and hundreds of LGBT Jamaicans to seek asylum in the United Kingdom, Canada, and the United States.

Violence against HIV positive people is commonplace, but legal repercussions for the aggressor are rare. The Joint United Nations Programme on HIV/AIDS representatives for Jamaica have described the blind-eye towards homophobic violence as "legalized discrimination" and have claimed that the violence has driven the HIV epidemic further underground, making access to treatment and outreach more difficult.

In January 2018, Jamaica banned Steven Anderson, from the Faithful Word Baptist Church in Tempe, Arizona, a Holocaust-denying anti-gay pastor, after an outcry from activists on the island. The pastor said he was about to board a flight to Kingston when he was informed he would not be allowed into Jamaica.

In January 2019, Director of Tourism Donovan White said that gay tourists are welcome, and that Jamaicans harboured no open hostility towards gay visitors during a press conference at the Caribbean Travel Marketplace in Montego Bay.

In September 2019, Mayor Omar Davis of Montego Bay, and Councilor Charles Sinclair (both elected officials) blocked the use of the local cultural center by the local LGBT group in a bid to protect the "sacredness" of the building. The government's actions forced the cancellation of the pride events; no other venues would rent their premises to the LGBT group, following the actions of Davis and Sinclair. Other venues cancelled their reservations made by the LGBT group owing to fear of a backlash. Furthermore, the police advised that because of the mayor and councilor's actions, and the homophobic hysteria that had been whipped up, they could not provide any kind of protection to LGBT Jamaicans. These circumstances forced the cancellation of the scheduled Pride events that were to be held in October 2019.

=== Media ===
In 2012, in what was called "an unprecedented constitutional legal challenge "a case was filed by LGBT activist Maurice Tomlinson in the Supreme Court of Jamaica against Jamaican television stations for refusing to air a 30-second advertisement “Love and Respect.” The ad, which promotes recognition of the humanity of LGBT people, was rejected by Television Jamaica (TVJ), Public Broadcasting Corporation (PBCJ) and CVM Television (CVM TV). in May 2013, the lawsuit was heard. In November 2013, the case Maurice Tomlinson v TVJ, CVM and PBCJ the Constitutional Court ruled against Tomlinson. The case was appealed. in February 2016, the Jamaican Court of Appeal heard the appeal, after it was originally scheduled in July 2015. The TV station Public Broadcasting Corporation (PBCJ) was not included in the appeal, and CVM withdrew from the case saying that they would accept any decision from the court. The court reserved its judgement, and the decision is pending.

=== Particular incidents ===
In June 2004, founding member and the public face of the Jamaican Forum for Lesbians, All-Sexuals and Gays (J-FLAG), and Jamaica's leading gay-rights activist, Brian Williamson, was stabbed to death in his home. Police ruled that the murder was the result of a robbery, but J-FLAG believes his murder was a hate crime. Human Rights Watch (HRW) researcher Rebecca Schleifer had a meeting with Williamson that day, and arrived at his home not long after his body had been discovered:

She found a small crowd singing and dancing. One man called out, "Battyman he get killed." Others were celebrating, laughing and shouting "Let's get them one at a time", "That's what you get for sin". Others sang "Boom bye bye", a line from a well-known dancehall song by Jamaican star Buju Banton about shooting and burning gay men. "It was like a parade", says Schleifer. "They were basically partying."

HRW also reported that police helped a suspect evade identification, and consistently refused to consider the possibility of a homophobic motive for the killing, with the senior officer responsible for the investigation claiming "most of the violence against homosexuals is internal. We never have cases of gay men being beaten up [by heterosexuals]."

A friend of Williamson's, Lenford "Steve" Harvey, who worked in Targeted Interventions at Jamaica AIDS Support for Life, was shot to death on the eve of World AIDS Day the following year. Gunmen reportedly burst into his home and demanded money, demanding to know: "Are you battymen?" "I think his silence, his refusal to answer that question sealed it," said Yvonne McCalla Sobers, the head of Families Against State Terrorism. "Then they opened his laptop and saw a photograph of him with his partner in some kind of embrace that showed they were together. So they took him out and killed him." Six people were charged with the killing. Their trial began, and was then postponed, in 2007. It was resumed in 2012; in 2014, one of the accused was set free.

In April 2006, students at the Mona campus of the University of the West Indies rioted as police attempted to protect a man who had been chased across the campus because another student had claimed the man had propositioned him in a bathroom. The mob demanded that the man be turned over to them. It only dispersed when riot police were called in and an officer fired a shot in the air.

In November 2012, two campus security guards beat a reportedly gay university student when he sought refuge from a mob of fellow students who were chasing him. The security company fired the two guards, and their action was condemned by the University of Technology, as well as the security company. The university established a working group to develop a sensitization and education program to deal with intolerance and bullying, and to recommend corrective measures.

In July 2013, a mob in St. James stabbed to death a gender-nonconforming 16-year-old, Dwayne Jones. The murder attracted international attention and outrage, especially in North America, resulting in condemnation of the killing by human rights groups. Police investigated the murder, however, no one has been arrested or charged, and the crime is still considered unsolved, as of 2022.

In August 2013, Dean Moriah, a gay businessman in Montego Bay, was stabbed to death in his home. His house was then set on fire and his car was stolen in the same incident. Following the murder, an investigation was launched to determine whether Moriah had been targeted due to his sexuality and both local and international gay rights activists argued that the murder was a homophobic hate crime. In 2014, a nineteen-year-old man was formally charged with the murder.

Also in August 2013, two men who were perceived by angry residents to be gay were forced to take refuge in a police station after a minor car accident.

In August 2017, Dexter Pottinger, a Jamaican gay activist, fashion designer, and face of Jamaica Pride 2016 and 2017, was robbed and found murdered with 25 knife stab wounds at his home in St. Andrew. In April 2019, in what has been described as a gay panic defense case, Romario Brown, who was initially charged with the murder of Pottinger, pleaded guilty to the lesser offence of manslaughter after his caution statement revealed that his actions were caused by provocation by the deceased. In May 2019, he was sentenced to 12 years for manslaughter. Pottinger's relatives said that the sentence was too short. His sister, Tashan Adams, said that the family was not satisfied and questioned the claims of the murderer.

== Gender ==
=== Homophobia based on masculine idealization ===
Jamaica has a heavily male-dominated social structure. Consequently, heterosexual relations are praised as signs of male virility in the lyrics of popular songs, particularly in Jamaican dancehall. Homosexual intercourse in this context is seen as a potential affront to the male "ideal". Popular music similarly reproduces and enforces heteronormativity and aggressive homophobia in Jamaican culture. The chorus of Jamaican dancehall hit "Boom Bye Bye" by Buju Banton repeats: "Boom bye bye Inna batty bwoy head, Rude boy no promote no nasty man Dem haffi ded". The song, commonly played in Jamaica for over ten years after it released, explicitly calls for the murder of men who have sex with men. This trope is rather common in dancehall music and reflects the "remarkably ubiquitous" homophobia in Jamaica. Aggressive homophobic attitudes in Jamaica are mostly attributable to the norms of hypermasculinity, which is roughly equivalent to the machismo found in Central and South America.

Homophobia in Jamaica is bolstered by the contemporary association of homosexuality with colonization, and by extension, of homophobia with anti-colonialism. Scholar Wayne Marshall describes that, in Jamaica, acts of homosexuality are believed to be "decadent products of the West" and "are thus to be resisted alongside other forms of colonization, cultural or political." This sentiment is easily demonstrated in the Jamaican dancehall hit "Dem Bow" by Shabba Ranks, in which homosexuality is violently condemned alongside a call for the "freedom for Black people."

Jamaican male sexual identity has long been defined in opposition to homosexuality. According to Dr. Kingsley Ragashanti Stewart, a professor of anthropology at the University of the West Indies, "A lot of Jamaican men, if you call them a homosexual, ... will immediately get violent. It's the worst insult you could give to a Jamaican man." Dr. Stewart believes that homophobia influences almost every aspect of life and shapes the everyday language of ghetto youth. "It's like if you say, 'Come back here,' they will say, 'No, no, no don't say 'come back'.' You have to say 'come forward,' because come back is implying that you're 'coming in the back,' which is how gay men have sex."

=== Attitudes about lesbians ===
Jamaica Gleaner columnist Morris Cargill, who supported the "nurture" view with respect to environment and sexual orientation, opinionated in 1999:

There seems to be a certain logic in female homosexuality. For if it is true, broadly speaking, we acquire our first sexual proclivities in infancy, girl children who are petted and fondled by their mothers, nurses and female relatives acquire what might be said to be a "normal" sexual affection for their own sex. But this is not true of male children, so it seems to me that there is a very fundamental difference between male and female homosexuality.

Amnesty International, however, has received reports of violence against lesbians, including rape and other forms of sexual violence. Lesbians reportedly have been attacked on the grounds of "mannish" physical appearance or other visible "signs" of sexuality. Some reports of abduction and rape come from inner-city communities, where local non-governmental organizations have expressed concerns about high incidences of violence against women.

Although lesbian civil ceremonies have taken place, Jamaica does not recognize any legal basis for partnerships between women. In 2012, American couple Jamaican-born Nicole Y. Dennis-Benn and Emma Benn held the first lesbian wedding in Jamaica, although their marriage was not legally recognized in Jamaica, they were by law, legally married in New York State (which legalized same-sex marriage in 2012) where they reside. The couple had their celebration ceremony in Jamaica after being lawfully married in the United States.

=== Transgender individuals ===
What makes the lives of transgender individuals in Jamaica different from those in other countries is the fact that Jamaican society has an exceptionally low tolerance for LGBTQ individuals, especially male-to-female transgender women, according to a case study done by the University of West Indies’ Sir Arthur Lewis Institute of Social Economic Studies. The stigmas placed upon these individuals influence their perception of the world, and upon internalizing these stigmas, the treatment process becomes more difficult. The viewpoint arises that doctors will stigmatize patients or treat them badly because of the unconventionality of the treatment being carried out. Ultimately, low tolerance leads patients to obtain less treatment overall.

== Religion ==
=== Homophobia based on religion ===
Many Jamaicans identify as devoutly Christian and claim that their anti-gay stance is based on religious grounds.

In June 2013, Jamaican church pastors rallied nearly 1,500 people in Kingston to support the country's buggery laws. Pastor Leslie Buckland of the Church of Christ argued that LGBT activists were trying to "take over the world" with their challenge of the laws. Buckland said that if the laws were repealed, activists would "go back to the court to make it a criminal offense to speak against the homosexual lifestyle."

In February 2006, a coalition of church leaders and members of the Lawyers' Christian Fellowship declared their opposition to the privacy provisions of a proposed Charter of Rights that would form the basis of an amended Jamaican Constitution. Chief among the concerns was that homosexuality could be made legal, although Justice Minister A. J. Nicholson and the leader of the opposition, Bruce Golding, denied this and opposed decriminalizing buggery.

Cecil Gutzmore at the University of the West Indies has written that religious fundamentalists believe that the Bible variously declares homosexuality to be an "abomination", a "vile affection", "unseemly", "not natural", or a "form of ungodliness".

Those who commit this great sin are thus unequivocally construed ... as legitimate subjects to be punished by terminal violence, a fate not only dealt out directly by God Himself but, presumably, also by those regarding themselves as His faithful servants and the possible agents of His will. These persons feel a kind of righteous justification for ... acting violently on God's behalf against perceived homosexuals and homosexuality. ... In Jamaica metaphorical stones enthusiastically and destructively cast take the form of homophobic song lyrics, passionate sermons, and parliamentary and party conference speeches that voice a refusal to liberalize anti-homosexuality laws.

Local LGBT-rights group J-FLAG acknowledges that anti-LGBT sentiment is influenced by certain passages from the Bible, but counters that,

the appropriation by legislatures of the Christian condemnation of homosexuals is a purely arbitrary process, guided largely by individual biases and collective prejudices. In the case of adultery, of which much more mention is made in Biblical text, Jamaica has no law pertaining to its condemnation or prosecution. The same applies to the act of fornication.

=== Attitudes of Rastafari from Jamaica ===
There are some homophobic attitudes in the Rastafari movement, according to an anonymous, well-educated Rasta elder in 2007:

The real reason why the average "Jah D" in Jamaica has this extreme, rational aversion to male homosexuality is not ... because of "fear of the other", it is not because of Biblical injunction; it is not because of its supposed "un-Africanness" nor the fact that Jamaica is nominally a "Christian country". It is simply that he cannot condone the abandonment of the clean "nip and tuck" of normal heterosexual relations for the unhygienic foray amid waste matter, unfriendly bacteria and toxic germs.

Senior Rastafari Ras Iyah V opposes the repeal of Jamaica's buggery laws. "I would have to stand with those who oppose homosexuality because that is not our way. From a moral and traditional African point of view, homosexuality is not acceptable."

Some Rastafari from Jamaica, however, have supported gay rights. British-born writer Benjamin Zephaniah said in 2005, "[I]t hurts when I see that [Jamaica] ... is now associated with the persecution of people because of their sexual orientation. I believe it is my duty to call upon all the progressive people of Jamaica ... to take a stand against homophobia." Mista Mahaj P, a Jamaican-born Rastafari based in the United States, released in 2011 reggae's first pro-gay album entitled Tolerance. King B-Fine, a Rastafari Reggae artist born in Jamaica, openly supports gay rights. He clarified this after some controversy about his song "Jah Nah Dead".

== Pop culture ==
=== Portrayal of LGBT people in popular Jamaican music ===
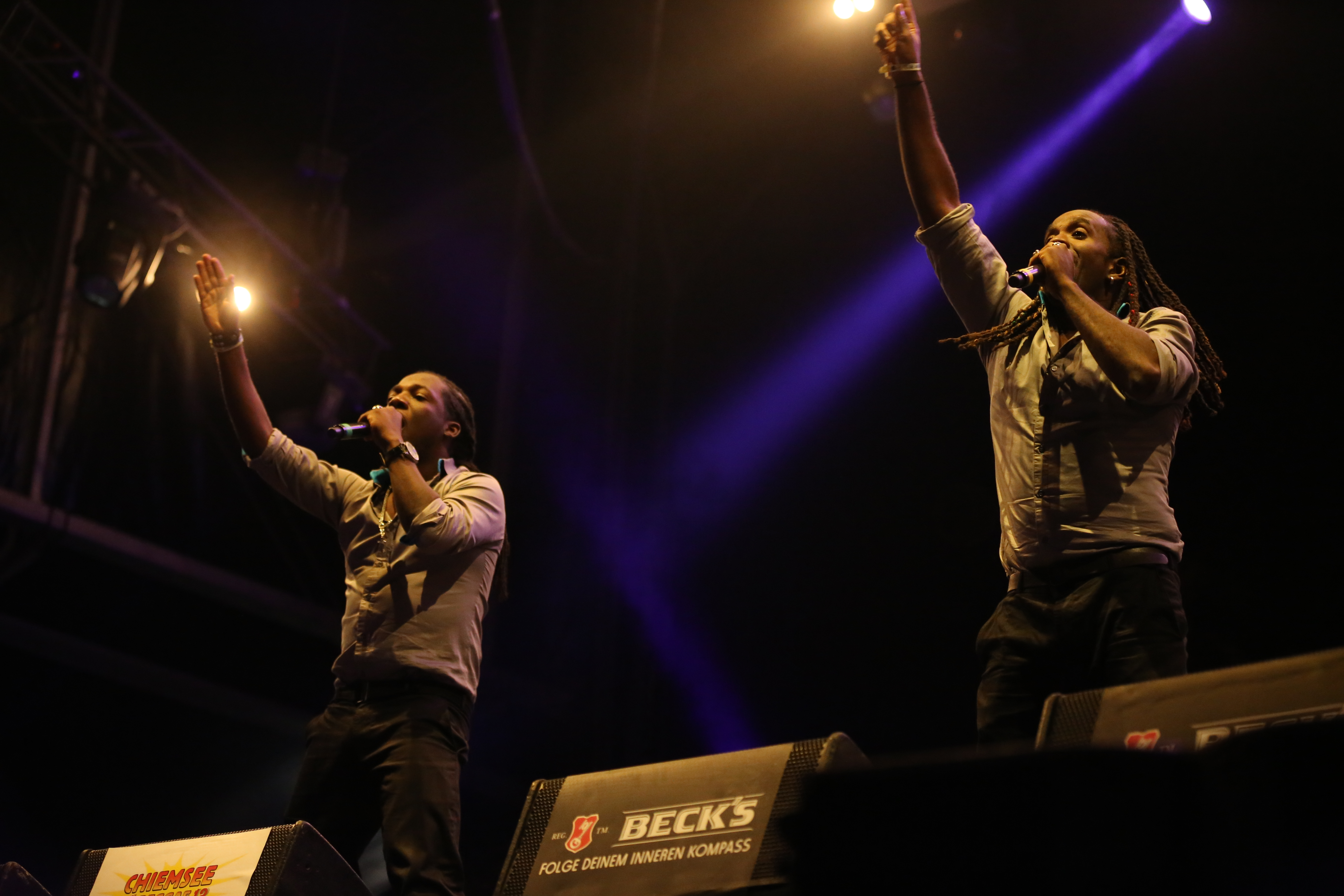
The Jamaican dancehall group T.O.K. were among several artists who refused to sign the Reggae Compassionate Act.

Jamaica's popular culture has a strong tradition of music, including reggae and dancehall. As a consequence, performers are high profile, both influencing popular opinion and reflecting it. The United States Department of State said that in 2012 "through the songs and the behavior of some musicians, the country's dancehall culture helped perpetuate homophobia." In its 2011 review of Jamaica for compliance with the International Covenant on Civil and Political Rights, the United Nations Human Rights Committee expressed regret over "virulent lyrics by musicians and entertainers that incite violence against homosexuals" and recommended that Jamaica investigate, prosecute, and sanction persons who do so.

Artists such as Buju Banton, Bounty Killer, Beenie Man, Mavado, Sizzla, Elephant Man, Capleton, T.O.K., Vybz Kartel and Shabba Ranks have during their careers written or performed, or both, songs that advocate attacking or killing gays and lesbians.

Buju Banton, according to Time Magazine, "is an avowed homophobe whose [1992] song Boom Bye-Bye decrees that gays 'haffi dead' ('have to die')." The song also "boasts of shooting gays with Uzis and burning their skin with acid 'like an old tire wheel'." Buju Banton's manager, Donovan Germain, has insisted that "Buju's lyrics are part of a metaphorical tradition. They're not a literal call to kill gay men."

One of Beenie Man's songs contains the lyrics: "I'm a dreaming of a new Jamaica, come to execute all the gays." Bounty Killer has urged his listeners to burn "Mister Fagoty" and make him "wince in agony." Elephant Man said in one of his songs, "When you hear a lesbian getting raped / It's not our fault ... Two women in bed / That's two Sodomites who should be dead." Lyrics from Sizzla's songs include: "Shot battybwoy, my big gun boom." (Shoot queers, my big gun goes boom.)

Some Rastafari have advocated for violence and discrimination against LGBT people. When singing about gay males, those advocates have used terms like "MAUMA MAN (Maama Man), FASSY HOLE (or simply FASSY), MR. BURN, PUSSYHOLE, FAGGOT, FISHMAN, FUNNY MAN, BUJU MAN, FREAKY MAN, POOP MAN, BUGGER MAN and the most commonly used, BATTY MAN (butt man) and CHI CHI MAN (chi chi, in Jamaica, is the slang for vermin)."

When singing about gay women, they have used terms like "SODOMITE, CHI CHI GAL or simply LESBIAN." The Bobo Ashanti, including dancehall singers Sizzla, Capleton, and Anthony B, condemn everything in conflict with their beliefs: "Fire pon politicians, Fire pon Vatican, Fire pon chi chi man..." Some singers have defended themselves by saying that it is "a 'spiritual fire.'"

An international campaign against homophobia by reggae singers was headed by OutRage!, the UK-based gay activism group, and the UK-based Stop Murder Music Coalition. An agreement to stop anti-gay lyrics during live performances and not to produce any new anti-gay material or re-release offending songs was reached in February 2005 between dancehall record labels and organizations opposed to anti-gay murder lyrics.

According to a 2005 published report, the Canadian High Commission in Jamaica was also requiring performers who wished to tour in Canada to sign an Entertainer Declaration that stated that they had read and fully understood excerpts from the Criminal Code, the Canadian Charter of Rights and Freedoms, and the Canadian Human Rights Act and would not "engage in or advocate hatred against persons because of their ... sexual orientation." Calls for a boycott of Jamaica and its music in Canada had provoked a debate over censorship and free expression in both Jamaica and Canada.

In August 2013, Queen Ifrica made anti-gay comments at the Grand Gala independence celebrations in Kingston, which were promptly criticised and labelled as inappropriate by the government's Ministry of Youth and Culture. The promoters of Rastafest in Toronto, held later the same month, then dropped her from the concert lineup after various persons and groups protested her inclusion.

A 2010 random survey of Jamaican adults showed that among those who most listened to reggae music, 65.0 percent expressed repulsion (the most negative emotion among the Riddle scale's eight possibilities) about persons in same-sex relationships. The percentages for dancehall music were 62.8 percent, 47.5 percent for rhythm and blues, 45.4 percent for those with no music preference, 42.9 percent for old hits and gospel, 35.3 percent for rock/alternative, and 30.8 percent for hip hop/rap.

In 2019, dancehall artist Shenseea released the music video for her song “Blessed” (featuring Tyga). In one of the video's opening scenes, Shenseea is undressed in bed next to another woman. In an article for The Face, author Summer Eldemire describes how the video can be viewed as resistance to homophobia in dancehall music, especially given the backlash Shenseea has received for performing at Jamaican pride events and for sharing intimate photos of her and another woman on Instagram.

In 2022, during Pride Month, Jamaican Canadian singer Mark Clennon released a music video for his song "Kingston", which featured a romantic storyline between Clennon and male model Jean-Julien Hazoumi. The music video became the first music video shot in Jamaica to feature an on-screen romance between two men.

=== Portrayal of LGBT people in literature ===
LGBT individuals are represented in the work of Jamaican authors such as Claude McKay, who left Jamaica in 1912 to pursue his writing career in Harlem. McKay is among the first Jamaican fiction authors to write about homosexuality; however, he refrained from being open about his own sexuality. In his novels Home to Harlem and Banjo, he creates "homosocial" worlds in which men engage sexually exclusively with other men. McKay is more widely known and accepted among the black community as a powerful figure in the Harlem Renaissance than as a pivotal figure in the queer community.

== LGBT Pride events in Jamaica ==
In 2015, Jamaica held its first LGBTQ Pride celebrations, known as PRIDEJA, a week-long event used to highlight the island's efforts to tackle discrimination and hate against the LGBT community. However, there was no parade, as it would have been risky for the marchers, according to J-FLAG. The Mayor of Kingston, Angela Brown-Burke, attended and spoke at the event, voicing her support by saying: "I come from the point of view that I, as mayor, have a responsibility to all the individuals of Kingston. There are individuals who are minorities who have been struggling in terms of their identity and finding their own space. It is important for us to provide safe spaces for them." Then Minister of Justice Mark Golding issued a statement in support of the gay Pride celebration, saying "I support the right of all Jamaicans, including members of the LGBT community, to express their opinions through any lawful means. As the LGBT community embarks on a week of activities to build awareness of the rights and needs of their members, I urge all Jamaicans to respect their right to do so in peace." Hollywood actor Elliot Page also attended the event. At the 2018 event, the cocktail reception was jointly hosted by the Charge d’ Affaires of the US Embassy, Eric Khant; British High Commissioner to Jamaica, Asif Ahmad and Canadian High Commissioner to Jamaica, Laurie Peters. It has been yearly celebrated ever since.

In October 2015, another pride event, Montego Bay Pride, was held for the first time, and has been yearly celebrated ever since. Growing from about 150 participants in 2015, it expanded to over 300 persons in 2016, to over 850 in 2017, and to over 900 in 2018. The 2017 pride saw Jamaica's first ever LGBT film festival, with four nights of documentaries highlighting the work for LGBT human rights in Canada, the United States, Uganda, and India. The 2018 pride saw a walk for acceptance and equality despite fear of attacks. Venues of pride events are not disclosed for security reasons.

== Health and wellness ==
=== Mental health ===
In a study by the International Journal of Sexual Health in 2007, in which LGBT individuals were selected from groups for sexual minority support, human rights, and HIV/AIDS care and prevention, 13% of individuals interviewed were diagnosed with depression, and 11% met the criteria for substance abuse. 76% of the participants reported that they were victims of abusive experiences up to twelve months prior to the interview, of whom 19% reported physical violence. There are several human rights and sexual minority support groups and HIV/AIDS programs already existing in Jamaica that provide social support, information services, counselling, legal representation, and education, but many argue that these programs lack organization and do not have enough mental health counsellors.

=== HIV/AIDS ===
==== Established and underlying determinants ====
According to a study conducted in 2015, adverse life events and low literacy have an effect on the prevalence of HIV among men who have sex with men (MSM) in Jamaica. Through the survey method, the researchers in this experiment found that these two factors are underlying determinants of the infection, and HIV was found most prevalent in MSM who were sex workers and had been raped. These men had lower self-esteem, which often leads to a reduction in ability to practice safe sex. Risk factors of HIV that have already been classified as established determinants such as receptive anal intercourse and casual sex partners tended to be more common among those MSM who had dealt with the issues formerly stated. Other underlying determinants of HIV include employment as sex workers, which made up 41.1% of those surveyed, and identifying as transgender, as did 52.9% of the survey participants. Overall, 31.4% of the MSM surveyed were HIV positive.

==== Prevention efforts ====
There are many efforts to combat HIV/AIDS in Jamaica and the broader Caribbean today. In 2001, the Caribbean Community (CARICOM) Heads of Government declared AIDS as a regional priority of the Caribbean, and the Pan Caribbean AIDS Partnership (PANCAP) was formed in order to initiate the region's response to HIV.

In Jamaica itself, there is a National Human Immunodeficiency Virus program based in the Jamaican Ministry of Health designed to slow the epidemic and decrease its impact. It has been a national plan in Jamaica to respond to HIV since 1988 when the National AIDS Committee was established to lead the island's multi-sectoral response to HIV/AIDS. To prevent the epidemic, information, education, and communication campaigns have been formed to promote condom use, control sexually transmitted infections (STI), and form workplace programs, HIV testing, and counselling.

There have also been efforts to minimize the stigma and discrimination surrounding issues relating to HIV and AIDS in Jamaica. In 2001, antiretroviral therapy was introduced in order to prevent vertical transmission of HIV from mother to child. In 2004, a public access treatment program was introduced, and in 2005 parliament unanimously adopted a national HIV/AIDS policy. The 2007-2012 National Strategic Plan included in it Jamaica's efforts toward aims to achieve access to HIV prevention worldwide.

==== Homophobia and HIV/AIDS in Jamaica ====
An estimated 1.8 percent of the age 18–49 population of Jamaica was HIV positive in 2011. The rate for men who have sex with men was 32.8 percent. The highest rates of infection were in the most urbanized parishes and in tourist areas. The HIV epidemic has been closely tied to poverty and developmental and socio-cultural issues, including slow economic growth, high levels of unemployment, early sexual debut, the culture of multiple partnerships, and the informal drug and commercial sex sectors. In 2004, Human Rights Watch issued a report on the status of LGBT people in Jamaica. The report documented widespread homophobia and argued that the high level of intolerance was harming public efforts to combat violence and the AIDS-HIV pandemic.

The way Jamaicans associate HIV with homosexual anal sex has been partly shaped by the international media coverage at the beginning of the epidemic. Dr. Robert Carr, widely recognized as one of the world's leading researchers on cultural forces and the unfolding of the HIV pandemic, said:

AIDS was seen as a disease of gay, White, North American men. And people were really afraid of it. There were no treatments available in the Caribbean at the time, so AIDS really was a death sentence. You had people with Kaposi's sarcoma, people with violent diarrhea, who were just wasting away and then dying in really horrible and traumatic ways. To call what was going on here "stigma and discrimination" was really an understatement. In the ghettos[,] they were putting tires around people who had AIDS and lighting the tires on fire. They were killing gay people because they thought AIDS was contagious. It was a very extreme environment, and really horrible things were happening.

Stigma has been associated with HIV in Jamaica since the beginning of the epidemic, partly because of its association with male homosexuality. Jamaican men, in particular, are so concerned about being associated with homosexuality that they are hesitant to seek HIV treatment and prevention services. Poor men living with HIV are assumed to have participated in same-sex sexual acts, and poor men who participate in those acts are assumed to be HIV positive. Some people in Jamaica become suicidal when they first receive their HIV diagnosis, rooted in the fear of isolation and discrimination that will result from others finding out and not from the potential of death associated with it. HIV is a reportable disease, resulting in a visit by a contact investigator who asks for the names of sexual partners. The spread of HIV also encourages a cycle of blame and violence, which marginalizes and encourages violence against a gay lifestyle. This cycle takes on further meaning under Jamaican law, which criminalizes all anal sex and often turns a blind eye to violence against homosexuals. Few are willing to take up the language of human rights against what is happening to homosexuals and HIV positive individuals because they are considered responsible for the spread of HIV.

A study conducted by AIDS researchers found that half of surveyed university students in Jamaica felt sympathetic towards heterosexual men and non-sex workers who were HIV positive, but did not feel the same for homosexual men and female sex workers. Essentially this study showed that less blame is attached to people who became positive through "less controllable" acts such as voluntary heterosexual intercourse or drug use. Many Jamaicans felt that sex workers and homosexuals are not to be pitied for contracting HIV because they were acting in a way that knowingly put themselves at higher risk. The secretive nature of gay culture in Jamaica makes outreach nearly impossible. Fear of being identified as gay has forced many men into early marriages in the hopes of avoiding future accusations. Miriam Maluwa, the UNAIDS country representative for Jamaica, said, "[Gay men] marry fairly rapidly, they have children fairly rapidly to regularise themselves, and that is really a ticking bomb". Gay men forced into heterosexual marriage are thus likely to have extramarital affairs, putting their wives at high risk for infection too.

== Summary table ==
| Same-sex sexual activity legal | No Up to 10 years in prison with hard labor and fines |
| Equal age of consent | No |
| Anti-discrimination laws in employment | No |
| Anti-discrimination laws in the provision of goods and services | No |
| Anti-discrimination laws in all other areas (incl. indirect discrimination, hate speech) | No |
| Same-sex marriages | No (Constitutional ban since 2011) |
| Same-sex civil unions | No |
| Recognition of same-sex couples | No |
| Step-child adoption by same-sex couples | No |
| Joint adoption by same-sex couples | No |
| Gays and lesbians allowed to serve openly in the military | No |
| Right to change legal gender | No |
| Access to IVF for lesbians | No |
| Commercial surrogacy for gay male couples | No |
| MSMs allowed to donate blood | No |

== See also ==
- Discrimination against LGBTQ people
- Human rights in Jamaica
- LGBTQ rights in the Americas
- LGBTQ rights in the Commonwealth of Nations
- State violence
