= Murder of Dwayne Jones =

2013 mob killing in Jamaica

Dwayne Jones sitting in a car's driver seat

Dwayne Jones was a Jamaican 16-year-old trans girl who was killed by a violent mob in Montego Bay in 2013, after she attended a dance party dressed in women's clothing. (Note: While some media commentators describe Jones as transgender, his best friend described him using male pronouns, and so other sources refer to him as a cross-dresser or gender non-conforming.) The incident attracted national and international media attention and brought increased scrutiny to the status of LGBT rights in Jamaica.

Perceived as effeminate, Jones was bullied in school and, at the age of 14, was forced out of her family home by her father. She moved into a derelict house in Montego Bay with transgender friends. On the evening of 21 July 2013, they went to the Irwin area of the city and attended a dance party. When some men at the party discovered that Jones was a trans woman, they confronted and attacked her. Jones was beaten, stabbed, shot, and run over with a car; she died in the early hours of the morning. Police investigated the murder but did not arrest or charge anyone for the crime, which remains unsolved.

The event made newspaper headlines in Jamaica and was also the subject of reporting in both the United Kingdom and the United States. The murder was condemned by Jamaican educators and the country's Justice Minister. In the wake of the attack, both domestic and international organisations devoted to LGBT rights and human rights – among them Human Rights Watch, Jamaicans for Justice, and the Jamaica Forum for Lesbians, All-Sexuals & Gays – asked the Jamaican authorities for a proper investigation and legal recognition of LGBT rights on the island.

== Background ==
=== Jones' biography ===
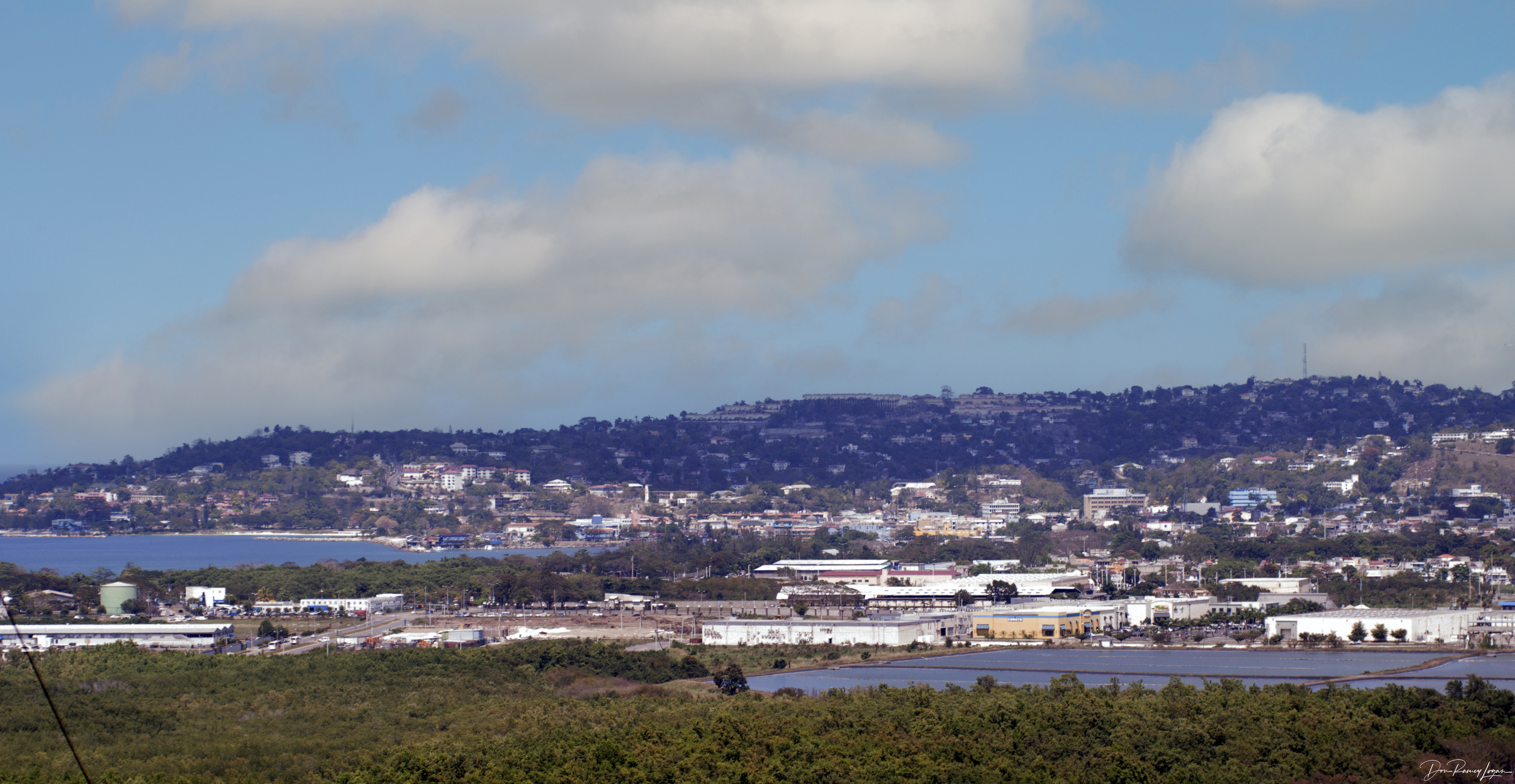
View of Montego Bay from the hillside, where Jones was squatting

Raised in an impoverished slum in Montego Bay, a city in northwest Jamaica, Jones faced bullying at high school from students who perceived her behaviour as effeminate. When Jones was 14, her father ejected her from the family home and encouraged neighbours to chase her out of the neighbourhood. After a period sleeping in bushes and on beaches, she began squatting in a derelict house in the hills above Montego Bay with two transgender friends, Keke and Khloe, both 23 at the time of Jones' death. Jones was known among friends as "Gully Queen", a reference to the storm drainage systems in which many homeless LGBT Jamaicans live. Friends noted that Jones desired to become a teacher or to work in the tourist industry. She also wanted to become a performer like the American pop star Lady Gaga, and had won a local dancing competition. Khloe described her as "a diva" who was "always very feisty and joking around".

=== Anti-LGBT sentiment in Jamaica ===
In 2006, Time magazine said that Jamaica may be the most homophobic country in the world. The country's laws criminalising same-sex activity between males were introduced in 1864, during the British colonial administration. According to the Sexual Offences Act of 2009, any man convicted under these laws must register as a sex offender. These laws have been cited as contributing to wider homophobic attitudes among the Jamaican populace, including the view that gay people are criminals regardless of whether or not they have committed any criminal act. Anti-LGBT perspectives have been furthered by the island's conservative Christian churches. Many reggae and dancehall songs, among them Buju Banton's "Boom Bye Bye", call for the killing of gays. Writing for the International Business Times in the summer of 2013, the journalist Palash Gosh noted that while Jamaica was "awash in crime and violence, gays and lesbians are particularly prominent targets of wanton brutality." In the mid-2000s, two of Jamaica's best-known LGBT rights activists, Brian Williamson and Lenford Harvey, were murdered. In the summer of 2013, Human Rights Watch carried out five weeks of fieldwork among Jamaica's LGBT community, reporting that over half of those interviewed had experienced violence as a result of their sexual orientation or gender identity, sometimes on more than one occasion.

== Murder ==
On the evening of 21 July 2013 – when Jones was 16 – she dressed in female clothing and attended a dance party called Henessey Sundays, held at a bar in the Irwin area with Keke and Khloe. She arrived by taxi at around 2 am. Jones passed as a girl at the party, and several males danced with her. Although she initially kept his biological sex a secret from others at the party, fearing homophobic persecution, she revealed her identity to a girl with whom she had previously been to church. The girl informed her male friends, who accosted her outside the venue, demanding to know, "Are you a woman or a man?" One of the men used a lantern to examine Jones' feet, claiming that they were too large to be those of a woman. Discovering her sex, they started calling her "batty boy" and other homophobic epithets. Khloe tried to get her away to avoid confrontation, whispering in her ear, "Walk with me, walk with me", but Jones refused, instead insisting to those assembled that she was female.

When someone pulled on Jones' bra strap, she ran away, and the crowd pursued and attacked her further down the road. She was beaten, stabbed, shot and run over by a car. She slipped in and out of consciousness for two hours before another attack finally killed her. There were no reports of anyone trying to help her during the altercation. Khloe was also attacked and almost raped, but escaped by hiding first in a church and then in neighbouring woods. Khloe commented, "When I saw Dwayne's body, I started shaking and crying. It was horrible." Police arrived at the scene at 5 am to find the body dumped in bushes along Orange Main Road. They launched an investigation into the homicide, inviting friends and family of the victim to contact them. Jones' family declined to claim the body, and her father refused to talk to the press about the incident.

On 14 August, Deputy Superintendent of Police Steve Brown announced that fourteen statements had been collected and that the investigation was progressing. In October 2013, a group of men set fire to the place in which Jones had lived as a squatter, forcing its four occupants to flee, in what was also believed to be an anti-LGBT hate crime. Everald Morgan, an officer at the St James Public Health Department, requested that police provide protection for the four youths made homeless by the arson attack, but they declined to do so. Meanwhile, a charity named Dwayne's House was set up in Jones' memory to aid homeless LGBT youth in Jamaica. As of May 2014, however, no one had been arrested or charged, and in August 2015 the crime was still considered unsolved.

== Reaction ==
=== In Jamaica ===
Jones' murder made headline news across Jamaica. Jamaica's Justice Minister, Senator Mark Golding, condemned the killing and called for an end to "depraved acts of violence" in Jamaica. He added that "all well-thinking Jamaicans must embrace the principle of respect for the basic human rights of all persons" and express tolerance towards minority groups. Annie Paul, the publications officer of the Jamaican campus of the University of the West Indies (UWI), stated that on the basis of comments provided on social media, she thought that most Jamaicans believed that Jones provoked his own murder by cross-dressing within a society that did not tolerate such behaviour. Newton D. Duncan, the UWI Professor of Paediatric Surgery, similarly noted that the "overwhelming majority" of Jamaicans believed that cross-dressers are homosexuals and deserve punishment. He added that this was a common misconception, because the majority of cross-dressers were heterosexual. He condemned the attack and compared it to the lynching of an African-American man in Harper Lee's novel To Kill a Mockingbird, drawing links between the anti-LGBT violence of Jamaica and the anti-black violence of the mid-20th century United States.

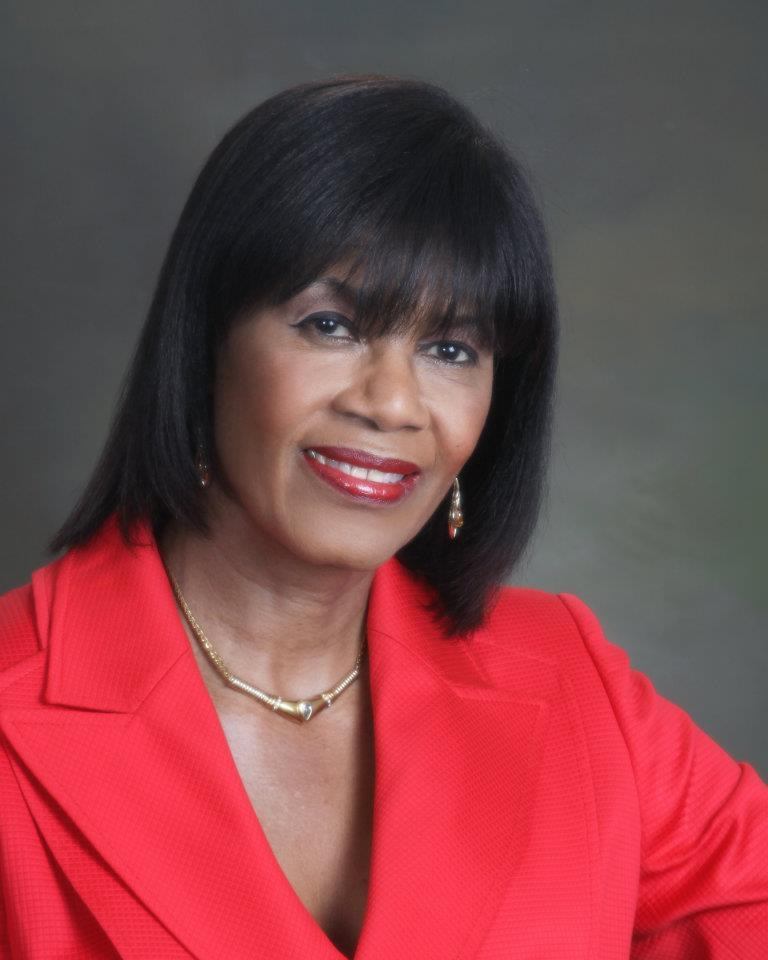
Domestic and foreign human rights organisations called on then Prime Minister Portia Simpson-Miller to improve LGBT rights in Jamaica, as she had promised during her election campaign.

Writing in the Jamaican broadsheet The Gleaner, Carolyn Cooper, Professor of Literary and Cultural Studies at UWI, condemned the group who committed Jones' murder. She blamed their behaviour on the selective use of the Bible, noting that while many Jamaicans embrace those Biblical passages that condemn same-sex sexual activity and cross-dressing, they are themselves typically guilty of many other Biblical sins, such as adultery and murder. She commented that Jones had been killed just for being himself and expressed the hope that his killers face legal prosecution for their crime. The following week she published a follow-up article in which she responded to several emails that she had received that claimed that the real victims of the scenario were the men whom Jones deceived when he was dancing with them. She reiterated her condemnation of Jones' killers, remarking that rather than retaliating violently, they should have brushed it off with a humorous comment.

Jaevion Nelson, an HIV/AIDS campaigner and human rights advocate, also published an article on the subject in The Gleaner. He noted that his initial reaction was to question why Jones had gone to the dance party and why he was not satisfied in attending Jamaica's underground gay parties. He added that he had subsequently realised that adopting this viewpoint was rooted in "the culture of violence" by which a victim is blamed for what happened to them. He called on Jamaicans to be tolerant of LGBT individuals, and to focus on "rebuilding this great nation on the principles of inclusivity, love, equality and respect with no distinctions whatsoever". Also in The Gleaner, Sheila Veléz Martínez, a law professor at the University of Pittsburgh, condemned the murder as "alarming evidence" of the high rates of homophobia in Jamaican society.

On 25 July, the Jamaica Forum for Lesbians, All-Sexuals & Gays (J-FLAG), an LGBT rights organisation, issued a public statement expressing their "deep concern" regarding the case, and offering their condolences to Jones' friends and family. They encouraged local people to aid the police in locating the perpetrators of the attack, which they asserted was an affront to Jamaica's democracy. J-FLAG's director Dane Lewis later commented that despite an increase in homophobic violence, Jamaican society was becoming more tolerant toward LGBT people; he attributed this to the actions of individuals like Jones, who have helped improve the public visibility of LGBT people in Jamaican society. Another LGBT rights organisation, Quality of Citizenship Jamaica, issued a press release calling for the government and churches to engage with LGBT organisations to establish common ground that could be undergirded by the principle of "true respect for all," found in the nation's National Anthem.

Quality of Citizenship Jamaica organised a silent protest on July 31, 2013 to honour his memory and call on the government to lead a proper investigation and protect LGBT Jamaicans. Human rights organisation Jamaicans for Justice called on Prime Minister Portia Simpson-Miller and religious leaders to condemn the murder, also commenting on what they saw as a lack of media coverage and public outrage about the incident, adding that "we must ask ourselves what this says about us as a people."

=== Internationally ===
"The story of Dwayne Jones lies at one extreme end of a continuum of violence experienced by Jamaicans who identify as lesbian, gay, transgender, or bisexual. Nevertheless, the circumstances of [Jones'] murder provide a snapshot of the current situation facing many LGBT people in Jamaica: a high risk of violence, vulnerability heightened by poverty and family rejection, and mixed responses from both the authorities and the public."

— Human Rights Watch, 2014

News of Jones' murder attracted international media attention, resulting in condemnation of the killing by human rights groups. Graeme Reid, the LGBT Rights Program director at Human Rights Watch in New York, issued a statement that the Jamaican government should send an "unequivocal message" that there would be "zero tolerance" of anti-LGBT violence. Reid noted that Jamaica's Prime Minister had vowed to decriminalise same-sex sexual activity in her 2011 election campaign but had yet to implement that promise. He encouraged the Jamaican authorities to take action to investigate Jones' murder and to promote respect for the country's LGBT citizens.

In a February 2014 briefing, the U.S. Acting Assistant Secretary of State for Democracy, Human Rights, and Labor, Uzra Zeya, cited Jones' case as well as the torture and murder of Cameroonian HIV/AIDS activist Eric Ohena Lembembe as examples of the "troubling acts of violence" against LGBT individuals that had happened across the globe in the previous year.

In the United Kingdom, a black LGBT organisation, the Out and Proud Diamond Group (OPDG), in association with the Peter Tatchell Foundation, organised a protest outside Jamaica's London embassy on 28 August. Talking to press, the OPDG's Marvin Kibuuka condemned Jones' murder and called for supporters to actively oppose the persecution of LGBT people in both Jamaica and elsewhere. Peter Tatchell later asserted that the lack of action by Simpson-Miller and the police was tantamount to colluding with those guilty of an anti-LGBT hate crime.

In her introduction to an academic study of "queerness and children's literature", Laura Robinson, an Associate Professor of English at the Royal Military College of Canada, cited Jones' murder alongside the 2013 Russian LGBT propaganda law as an example in which youth issues intersected with LGBT issues. She added that Jones was a "child who did not end up having what Judith Butler calls a 'livable life'."

== See also ==
- List of unsolved murders (2000–present)
- List of people killed for being transgender
- Cenida Ramos – 2014 LGBT murder victim in Belize
