= Human Rights Logo =

Logo to support the global human rights movement

The Human Rights Logo

The Human Rights Logo has its origin in the international "Logo for Human Rights" initiative, which was started in 2010. Its goal was to create an internationally recognized logo to support the global human rights movement. The winning logo was created by Predrag Stakić from Serbia.

== The winning logo ==
The Human Rights Logo combines the silhouette of a hand with that of a bird. It is intended as a peaceful contribution towards strengthening human rights and as such is meant to be used across cultural and language borders. The logo is now available to everyone at no cost as an open source product. It is free from rights and can be used worldwide by everyone without paying fees or obtaining licenses.

== The competition ==
The goal of the Logo for Human Rights initiative was to create an internationally recognized symbol for human rights. To this end, an international online design competition starting on 3 May 2011 (World Press Freedom Day) launched a global appeal for submissions of logo designs and put them to a vote. The competition is known as one of the largest, most complex creative crowdsourcing projects ever conducted.

From the more than 15,300 suggestions from over 190 countries a collective decision by all participants selected the top hundred logos, after which an international jury decided on the top ten logos. From these 10 logos, the internet community selected a winner within a three-week voting period. The competition officially ended on 23 September with the presentation of the universal logo for human rights during UN General Assembly week in New York City by Cinema for Peace.

== Presentation of the winning logo ==
The presentation of the winning logo took place on 23 September 2011 in New York, in an event organised by Cinema for Peace with former editor-in-chief of Time Magazine Michael J. Elliott hosting the event. In speeches, television journalist Ann Curry and German Federal Foreign Minister Guido Westerwelle, as well as human rights activists Carolyn Gomes from Jamaica and Angelina Atyam from Uganda, emphasized the importance of a universal symbol in the worldwide struggle for human rights. The musical highlight of the evening was a performance by soprano Jessye Norman.

== The jury ==
The initiative is supported by a jury of renowned and high-ranking personalities, who have worked to further the cause of human rights. These include:

- Ai Weiwei (artist and human rights activist)
- Angelina Acheng Atyam (human rights activist, winner of the United Nations Human Rights Award)
- Jimmy Carter (Nobel Peace Prize laureate)
- Aung San Suu Kyi (Nobel Peace Prize laureate)
- Waris Dirie (model and human rights activist)
- Shirin Ebadi (Nobel Peace Prize laureate)
- Roland Emmerich (film director and producer)
- Guillermo Fariñas (human rights activist)
- Carolyn Gomes (human rights activist)
- Mikhail Gorbachev (Nobel Peace Prize laureate)
- Mukhtar Mai (human rights activist)
- Somaly Mam (human rights activist)
- Juanes (singer and peace activist)
- Navanethem Pillay (UN High Commissioner for Human Rights)
- Paikiasothy Saravanamuttu (winner of the 2010 Citizens Peace Award of the National Peace Council of Sri Lanka)
- Jimmy Wales (co-founder of Wikipedia)
- George Yeo (former Singaporean Minister for Foreign Affairs and visiting scholar at the Lee Kuan Yew School of Public Policy)
- Muhammad Yunus (Nobel Peace Prize laureate)

In addition to the jury members, the foreign ministers of the founding countries (Bosnia and Herzegovina, Canada, Chile, the Czech Republic, Germany, Mauritius, Senegal, Singapore and Uruguay) are partners to the initiative.
