= Jamaica coalition =

Jamaica coalition can refer to:

- Jamaica coalition (politics), a term in German politics that describes a potential coalition among the parties of the Christian Democratic Union/Christian Social Union (CDU/CSU), Free Democratic Party (FDP), and the Green Party.
- The Jamaica Coalition on the Rights of the Child, a UNICEF sponsored program in Jamaica for protection of children's rights.
