= Murder of Lenford Harvey =

2005 murder of a Jamaican activist

Lenford "Steve" Harvey

Lenford "Steve" Harvey was a Jamaican activist who campaigned for the rights of those living with HIV/AIDS in Jamaican society. In November 2005, he was abducted from his home and murdered in a robbery that some commentators believed was also a homophobic hate crime. Harvey, an openly gay man, had worked for Jamaica AIDS Support for Life (JASL), since 1997 becoming the group's coordinator for Kingston. In this position, he focused on distributing information and services surrounding HIV/AIDS to the most marginalised sectors of Jamaican society, among them prisoners, sex workers, and lesbian, gay, bisexual, and transgender (LGBT) people. In 2005, he was selected as Jamaica's project coordinator for the Latin America and Caribbean Council of AIDS Service Organizations. Harvey was praised for his work. According to Peter Tatchell of the British LGBT rights organisation OutRage!, "It is thanks to the efforts of Steve and his colleagues that many Jamaican men and women - both gay and straight - have not contracted HIV. They have helped save hundreds of lives."

In November 2005, three men carrying guns broke into Harvey's home, removing any valuables they could find. They asked him if he was gay, and when he refused to respond to them, they kidnapped him, later shooting him dead and dumping the body elsewhere. The police subsequently arrested four individuals and charged them with murder in the furtherance of a robbery. The accused remained in police custody for almost ten years before the case came to court. At that point, the police dropped their murder charges against two of the accused. The other two, Dwayne Owen and Andre West, went on trial and were found unanimously guilty of murder by a jury. Although prosecutors had requested capital punishment in the case, the judge instead sentenced them to life in prison with a minimum of thirty years before becoming eligible for parole. They remain in prison, as of 2022.

== Background ==
=== Harvey's biography ===
In 1997, Harvey became involved with Jamaica AIDS Support for Life (JASL), an organisation that was a partner of Christian Aid. He became the group's Kingston co-ordinator, and in this position primarily worked to ensure that the marginalised groups within the country – including prisoners, sex workers, and lesbian, gay, bisexual, and transgender (LGBT) people – had access to information about the HIV virus. He was selected as Jamaica's representative at the Latin America and Caribbean Council of AIDS Service Organizations. He was also a registered delegate to the conference of the People's National Party. In the week preceding his death, Harvey led JASL's annual candle-lit vigil in memory of those who had died as a result of AIDS.

=== Anti-LGBT sentiment in Jamaica ===
In 2006, Time magazine asked whether Jamaica was "the most homophobic place on Earth", and answered that it "may be the worst offender". The country's laws criminalising same-sex activity between males were introduced in 1864, during the British colonial administration. According to the Sexual Offences Act of 2009, any man convicted under these laws must register as a sex offender. These laws have been cited as contributing to wider homophobic attitudes among the Jamaican populace, including the view that gay people are criminals regardless of whether or not they have committed any crime. Anti-LGBT perspectives have been furthered by the island's conservative Christian churches. Many reggae and dancehall songs, among them Buju Banton's "Boom Bye Bye", call for the killing of gays. Writing for the International Business Times in the summer of 2013, the journalist Palash Gosh noted that while Jamaica was "awash in crime and violence, gays and lesbians are particularly prominent targets of wanton brutality." In the summer of 2013, Human Rights Watch carried out five weeks of fieldwork among Jamaica's LGBT community, reporting that over half of those interviewed had experienced violence as a result of their sexual orientation or gender identity, sometimes on more than one occasion.

== Murder ==
On the night of Wednesday 30 November 2005, three armed men broke into Harvey's home, confronting him and his two roommates and demanding money. The intruders said "We hear that you are gay" and while the two roommates denied this, Harvey – who was openly gay – remained silent. The two roommates were bound and gagged while Harvey was forced to carry valuables to the criminal's car. At gunpoint, they forced him into the car and abducted him.

Two hours later, Harvey's corpse was found at Pinewood Terrace, a rural area far from his home; his body had gunshot wounds in the head and back. Harvey's clothes, suitcases, jewellery, cellphones, and watches were recovered by police. Reporter Gary Younge expressed the view that the killing "appears to have been a homophobic attack", while an editorial in The New York Times noted that "the Harvey killing has the earmarks of a hate crime".

=== Arrest and trial ===
Following investigations, in 2005 police arrested four individuals – Dwayne Owen, Andre West, Ryan Wilson, and Chevaughn Gibson – charging them all with committing murder in the furtherance of a robbery. The accused were from an area known as Vietnam in Grant's Pen. Defence lawyers repeatedly complained that the prosecution had been late in handing over relevant documents to them.

The case was brought before the Home Circuit Court on 24 April 2014, however it could not proceed because important documents had not been served on the defence. The witnesses for the case, who included ten police officers and two civilians, were bound over. Senior Puisne Judge Gloria Smith stated that no further adjournments of the case would be permitted, ordering the Director of Public Prosecutions to make full disclosure to the defence, and insisting that the trial must start on 19 May. In her words, "This case has been going on for far too long and has reached the point where something must happen." However, on that date the trial was postponed again due to the unavailability of a courtroom, being rescheduled for 1 June. At that date it was again postponed, this time due to a shortage of available jurors, with the new date being set for 7 July.

In early July 2014, the prosecution announced that they were dropping all charges against Wilson, who was declared free to go after over eight years in prison. They had determined that at the time of the murder he had been in custody at the Constant Spring Police Station. The prosecution also stated that it was dropping the murder charges against Gibson, who would instead be charged with misprision of felony. After a three-week trial, in late July a twelve-person jury unanimously found both Owen and West guilty of murder. The state prosecutors, Kathy Pryce and Karen Seymour Johnson, requested that Owen and West face the death penalty. However, in November Justice Lloyd Hibbert sentenced them to life in prison, stipulating that they must serve a minimum of thirty years before becoming eligible for parole. He stated that in sentencing the pair he took into account the fact that they had already spent a decade in custody. In December, both Owen and West launched appeals against their conviction.

Independently of the Harvey case, West was also charged with being involved in the murder of Jamie Lue, a financial analyst at Alliance Capital Limited, who had been abducted, robbed, and killed in December 2005.

== Reaction ==
In December 2005, the Joint United Nations Programme on HIV/AIDS (UNAIDS) issued a statement expressing the view that "Harvey's death is a profound shock and loss not only to the AIDS movement in Jamaica and the Caribbean, but to the whole world", furthermore calling on the Jamaican government to ensure that Harvey's killers be found and convicted. Rebecca Schleifer, a researcher with Human Rights Watch's HIV/AIDS and Human Rights Program, stated that Harvey was "a person of extraordinary bravery and integrity, who worked tirelessly to ensure that some of Jamaica's most marginalized people had the tools and information to protect themselves from HIV/AIDS".

According to Peter Tatchell of the British LGBT rights organisation OutRage!, "It is thanks to the efforts of Steve and his colleagues that many Jamaican men and women - both gay and straight - have not contracted HIV. They have helped save hundreds of lives." The Guyanese Society Against Sexual Orientation Discrimination issued a press release condemning Harvey's killing and calling for the perpetrators to be convicted.

== See also ==
- LGBT rights in Jamaica
- Murder of Dwayne Jones
