= LGBTQ rights in Guyana =

- Guyana
- Legal status: Male illegal Female legal
- Penalty: Up to life imprisonment (not enforced; legalization pending)
- Gender identity: No
- Military: No
- Discrimination protections: None

Family rights
- Recognition of relationships: No recognition of same-sex relationships
- Adoption: No

Lesbian, gay, bisexual, transgender and queer (LGBTQ) people in Guyana face legal and societal challenges not experienced by non-LGBTQ residents. Guyana is the only country in South America, and the only mainland country in the Americas, where homosexual acts are illegal. Cross-dressing was illegal until November 2018, when the statute was struck down by the Caribbean Court of Justice, the court of last resort of Guyana. Efforts to decriminalize homosexual behavior have gained momentum from legal developments in neighboring countries with a common legal heritage as former British colonies. In August 2016, the Belize Supreme Court, and in April 2018, the High Court of Trinidad and Tobago, each ruled that laws criminalizing homosexuality in their respective jurisdictions were unconstitutional. These landmark rulings have been noted as potential legal precedents to strengthen the case for repeal of Guyana's corresponding laws, with all 3 countries having related jurisprudence. Guyanese society tends to view homosexuality and transgender people negatively, though attitudes are slowly changing and becoming more accepting. The country's first pride parade took place in June 2018 with the support of various political and religious leaders, making it the first such event in the English-speaking Caribbean. It has inspired other countries to hold their own pride parades such as Barbados, Trinidad and Tobago and Saint Lucia. The country's second pride parade took place in June 2019. Subsequent events in 2020 and 2021 had to be postponed due to the COVID-19 pandemic, but Guyana's LGBTQ community held its largest event in the capital Georgetown in June 2022, with another planned in 2023.

== Laws about same-sex sexual activity ==
In common with other former British colonies, Guyana had criminal codes imposed by its colonial rulers. Prohibitions against "buggery", "gross indecency" and "indecent behavior" were widely enacted across the British Empire in the nineteenth century. Although the terms are not explicitly defined in law, their English common law interpretation was well established by the time the Criminal Law (Offences) Act (1893) was introduced in Guyana. The country inherited the Act itself and the common law understanding of its provisions; these were retained following independence, long after the repeal of such offences in Britain.

The criminalization of same-sex activity under the Act are contained in the following provisions:'

Section 351 Any male person who, in public or private, commits, or is a party to the commission, or procures or attempts to procure the commission, by any male person, of any act of gross indecency with any other male person shall be guilty of a misdemeanour and liable to imprisonment for two years.

Section 352 (Note: Clauses (b) and (c) of §352 deal with sexual assaults, so are intentionally omitted from the quotation, as provisions of the Act not relevant to LGBT rights. Those provisions are: " ... or (b) assaults any person with intent to commit buggery; (c) or being a male, indecently assaults any other male person ...") Everyone who–
(a) attempts to commit buggery;
[...]
shall be guilty of felony and liable to imprisonment for ten years.

Section 353 Everyone who commits buggery ... shall be guilty of felony and liable to imprisonment for life.

Section 354 Everyone who–
(a) does any indecent act in any place to which the public have or are permitted to have access; or
(b) does any indecent act in any place, intending thereby to insult or offend any person, shall be guilty of a misdemeanour and liable to imprisonment for two years.

=== Decriminalization efforts ===
Following a call to decriminalise homosexuality from the United Nations Special Envoy on HIV/AIDS to the Caribbean, Dr. Edward Greene, the Guyanese Government announced in April 2012 that it was launching a national debate on whether to overhaul the country's laws that discriminate against LGBTQ people. Religious groups voiced their opposition to any changes in those laws. In 2013, the Government created a parliamentary commission to decide whether to scrap the country's buggery laws. It started receiving public submissions in early 2014.

During the 2015 elections, both major political parties expressed support for LGBTQ rights. The People's Progressive Party stated that: "We believe that all Guyanese must be free to make choices and must not be discriminated against because of their ethnicity, gender, religion or sexual orientation." The electoral manifesto of APNU-Alliance for Change, the largest party in Parliament, calls for an end to discrimination against LGBTQ people.

In April 2017, the Government announced it would hold a referendum to decide whether to decriminalise homosexuality. No definite plans were announced, and in May 2017, Pink News reported that no referendum would be held, with the initial reports being characterised as a "misunderstanding". The LGBTQ advocacy organisation, SASOD, were not in favour of such a referendum, fearing it would likely foster expressions of homophobia.

President David A. Granger supports legalising same-sex sexual acts. In 2016, he said: "I am prepared to respect the rights of any adult to indulge in any practice which is not harmful to others."

In August 2016, the Belize Supreme Court struck down Belize's sodomy ban as unconstitutional. One impediment to a similar reform process in Guyana is the "savings clause" contained in the country's Constitution. The clause has the effect of preventing judicial review of laws inherited from the British Empire, even in cases where they may undermine human rights.

In May 2019, the Society Against Sexual Orientation Discrimination stated that it hopes the Legal Affairs Ministry's Law Reform Commission, after meeting with stakeholders, will be able to update the "archaic" laws in keeping with international practices. This would see the removal of discriminatory clauses.

In July 2025, before the September 2025 elections, 5 out of 6 of Guyana's main political parties expressed their support for the decriminalization of homosexuality.

In September 2025, after the 2025 elections, Guyanese president, Irfaan Ali, promises to decriminalize homosexuality and work with SASOD (the Society Against Sexual Orientation Discrimination) to decriminalize same-sex acts between men.

== Family and relationship policy ==
Recognition of same-sex unions in South America Marriage Other type of partnership Unrecognized Constitution limits marriage to opposite-sex couples Same-sex sexual activity illegal, though penalties not enforced

=== Same-sex relationships ===
Same-sex marriage and civil unions do not exist in Guyana.

=== Adoption and parenting ===
According to the U.S. Department of State, an LGBTQ person is not disqualified from adopting a child in Guyana. Both married and single people may adopt.

In December 2015, the Director of Guyana's Childcare and Protection Agency (CPA) stated that the CPA does not discriminate as there are no laws barring LGBTQ individuals and same-sex couples from adopting, being foster parents or guardians. The statement also encourages LGBTQ individuals to become adoptive parents and reiterates the lack of legal barriers as the Director of the CPA can issue a mandate determining which potential applicants can adopt under the Childcare and Protection Act.

== Gender identity and expression ==
Under Guyanese law, cross-dressing was illegal until 2018. In 2009, several transgender activists were arrested for wearing clothes of the opposite sex. In 2010, Guyana Trans United launched a Supreme Court challenge against the cross-dressing law. In 2013, Chief Justice Ian Chang ruled that cross-dressing was legal unless done for an "improper purpose". Guyana Trans United appealed the case to Guyana's Court of Appeal, denouncing the law as discriminatory and unconstitutional. However, the Court of Appeal subsequently upheld Chang's ruling. The case was then appealed to the Caribbean Court of Justice (CCJ).

At issue was the vagueness of "improper purpose" and whether the law can be challenged because of the savings clause exemption. The savings clause prevents colonial-era laws from being challenged. The oral arguments in the case began on 28 June 2018, and the court reserved the ruling for a later date. On 13 November 2018, the Caribbean Court of Justice ruled in the case Quincy McEwan, Seon Clarke, Joseph Fraser, Seyon Persaud and the Society Against Sexual Orientation Discrimination (SASOD) v The Attorney General of Guyana that Section 153(1)(XLVII) of the Summary Jurisdiction (Offences) Act is unconstitutional and must be struck down from the legal code. The panel of five judges ruled that the statute, in addition to being archaic and vague, "violated the appellants' right to protection of the law and was contrary to the rule of law". In 2017, a trans woman was assaulted and attacked in the capital city of Georgetown. She reported the attack to the police and filed a case against her attacker before the Georgetown Magistrates Court. On 2 March 2017, the day the verdict was given, she was denied entry into the courtroom because she was not "dressed like a man". The court later dismissed her case.

== Discrimination protections ==
In December 2000, the National Assembly of Guyana unanimously approved a proposed amendment to the Constitution that would have prohibited discrimination based on sexual orientation. But the efforts of religious leaders prior to the March 2001 elections caused President Bharrat Jagdeo to deny his assent to the amendment. A new amendment, containing only the sexual orientation clause, was put before the Assembly in 2003, although it made no progress and was later withdrawn by the Government. In 2016, Minister of Social Protection Amna Ally pledged to be a "driving force" to end discrimination against LGBTQ people. In July 2019, Ally revealed during a presentation of Guyana's statement on the ninth periodic report on the implementation of the Convention on the Elimination of All Forms of Discrimination Against Women (CEDAW) in Geneva, Switzerland that the Guyanese Government is working to ensure all legal gaps are removed to prevent discrimination based on sexual orientation and gender identity. She said, "The government believes that every individual regardless of sexual orientation, gender identity has an inherent human right to live their life free from violence, abuse and discrimination."

== Living conditions ==
=== LGBT community activity ===
Guyana's first pride parade was held on 2 June 2018 in Georgetown. Hundreds of marchers called for the decriminalization of homosexuality and "the spread of love, not hate". Groups involved in the event included Caribbean Equality, the Guyana Rainbow Foundation, Guyana Trans United and the Society Against Sexual Orientation Discrimination. No violent incident occurred and the event received notable media coverage. The British High Commission flew a rainbow flag in support of the march. In the lead up to the event, a social media post of a father writing to his lesbian daughter condemning homophobia went viral. Global Voices said the "event allowed the country's LGBT community the opportunity to step out of the cloak of invisibility and claim their right to be proud of who they are and who they choose to love." The event was the first pride parade in the English-speaking Caribbean, and has inspired other countries to hold their own similar marches such as Barbados, Trinidad and Tobago and Saint Lucia.

The second pride festival was held between 28 May to 3 June 2019. On 1 June 2019, two hundred people participated in the second pride parade that was held incident-free with police protection. However, there were some persons along the route who shouted insulting words at the participants. Among the participants was MP Priya Manickchand, who "recalled times when Guyana was intolerant of the community and stated how happy she was because Guyanese have finally become more accepting". She further compared the fight for LGBTQ rights to the fight for women's rights. On 17 May 2019, the Empowering Queers Using Artistic Learning (EQUAL) organization was launched. Its main objective is to empower LGBTQ persons using artistic learning or artistic education. "This empowerment will be accomplished especially by utilizing the queer cultures that already exist in Guyana and molding them into positive contributions to society, so as to change the negative rhetoric that is constantly referenced in many sectors in Guyana."

=== Opposition ===
About 60% of the population are Christians, while the remaining are mostly Hindu and Muslim. A number of religious leaders and groups have resisted proposed discrimination protections for LGBTQ people. Shortly before the first pride parade on 2 June 2018, the Georgetown Ministers' Fellowship called on the government to ban the event, stating that LGBTQ people should have no right to freedom of assembly and freedom of speech. The group called the event "immoral". The government ignored their request. Furthermore, the Anglican Bishop of Guyana and Suriname expressed support for the march, saying: "I disagree with the call to ban and must point out that the LGBT community has the right like all of us to march on the streets of Georgetown with police permission. We are all God's children and our rights must be protected. I am the Bishop of Guyana and I approve this message."

=== Violence and harassment ===
Discrimination and violence against LGBTQ people are widespread in Guyana. LGBTQ persons often face violence and verbal harassment in Guyana, at the hands of law enforcement, religious leaders and others, and because of this, most keep their sexual orientation hidden. A common term for gay men in Guyana is "anti-men". In May 2019, managing director of the Society Against Sexual Orientation Discrimination (SASOD), Joel Simpson, said that over the years discriminatory laws have contributed to the extortion of LGBTQ people by law enforcement authorities. Several cases have been recorded where victims of anti-LGBTQ attacks were blackmailed by police officials who threatened to arrest them due to the country's law criminalizing homosexuality. Simpson added that the number of hate crimes often go unreported. The organization has also been working with health professionals to improve their knowledge of LGBTQ people and with the University of Guyana and nursing schools throughout the country.

In June 2019, Joel Simpson, managing director of SASOD, was the victim of an alleged homophobic attack. In what he categorised as a "hate crime", Simpson was attacked and beaten by six men early in the morning of 16 June as he was waiting to purchase food at Bourda Market, hours after being harassed by the same group at the Palm Court nightclub. He filed an official police complaint and called for hate crime legislation that covers sexual orientation and gender identity. The Ministry of Social Protection condemned the attack and said that members of the LGBTQ community should be accepted for who they are. One of the assailants turned himself in on 8 July 2019.

In July 2019, in a case that has been described as a usage of the gay panic defence, the Guyana Court of Appeal reduced Clive Knights' conviction for the murder of insurance company executive Bert Whyte in 2012, substituting instead a conviction of manslaughter and imposing a sentence of 30 years' imprisonment. Knights claimed that he fatally stabbed Whyte after Whyte had made "unwanted homosexual advances". The conviction was reduced from that of June 2015 after he had been sentenced to 57 years in jail after a jury found him guilty of the murder.

== Public opinion ==
The country's social and political norms have been heavily influenced by Christianity and the conservative mores of colonial British society. Disapproval of homosexuality has been historically widespread in Guyana's population, although social research since the 2010s, show signs that more accepting attitudes are growing in the community. According to a 2013 survey by the Caribbean Development Research Services Inc. (CADRES), roughly eight per cent of Guyanese society identified as LGBTQ, with about two per cent identifying as gay, one per cent as lesbian and four per cent as bisexual. Another 15 per cent answered that they did not want to state their sexual orientation. The same survey found that half of Guyanese people had a gay friend and a quarter had gay family members.

The CADRES study found that about 24% of respondents "hate" homosexuals, while 38% were "tolerant" and 25% were "accepting". Broken down by religion, the study concluded evangelical Christians were the most opposed to homosexuality and non-evangelical Christians were the most accepting. Hindus and Muslims were somewhere in between. A plurality of people in the survey stated that homosexuality was not an illness, but rather, a choice. Slightly more than half (53%) of Guyanese supported the criminalization of homosexual acts, but more than half (52%) also stated they would be willing to change their minds if such laws "contributed to social and psychological problems" among the LGBTQ community.

The 2013 CADRES study observed that 14% of Guyanese people supported legalizing same-sex marriage, while a 2010 Latin American Public Opinion Project (LAPOP) Vanderbilt University study found that Guyana had amongst the lowest level of support in the Americas, with a score of 7.2 units (on a 0–100 point scale, indicating overall strength of support among respondents); the average score in the Americas overall was 26.8 points. (Note: Indicative of the wide variation in the LAPOP scores for support of same-sex marriage within countries of the Americas, are the mean scores of the three most supportive nations: Canada (63.9 points), Argentina (57.7 points), Uruguay (50.5 points). In comparison, the lowest country score is 3.5 in Jamaica –the only country score below that of Guyana's– and an average score in the Americas overall of 26.8 points.) In comparison, the AmericasBarometer released by LAPOP in 2017 reported nearly triple the support for same-sex marriage, with the corresponding score now 20.6.

=== Growing tolerance ===
The majority of Guyanese people now accept or tolerate LGBTQ persons, according to the findings of an October 2022 poll named "perceptions and attitudes towards LGBT Persons in Guyana" commissioned by the Society Against Sexual Orientation Discrimination (SASOD) "hatred" of LGBTQ people had decreased from 25% in 2013 to 12%. Additionally, 72.4% of respondents said they accept and tolerate LGBTQ persons (compared with 34.5 per cent in 2013). A total of 1,070 respondents were interviewed for the poll, which was conducted across most regions in Guyana, constituting a representative sample of the population in line with the national census. It concluded that "LGBT acceptance was increasing in Guyana".

=== Religiosity ===
Compared to populations in Western countries, LGBTQ people in Guyana tend to be more religious. According to the 2013 CADRES study, 83% of LGBTQ Baháʼís, and 80% of LGBTQ Jews are actively involved in religious activities, followed by Hindus (69%), Baptists (62%), evangelical Christians (59%), Muslims (48%), and non-evangelical Christians (26%).

== Summary table ==
Same-sex sexual activity legal	No Male illegal (Penalty: Up to life imprisonment – unenforced. Decriminalization pending) Yes Female always legal.
Equal age of consent	No
Anti-discrimination laws in employment only	No
Anti-discrimination laws in the provision of goods and services	No
Anti-discrimination laws in all other areas (incl. indirect discrimination, hate speech)	No
Same-sex marriages	No
Recognition of same-sex couples	No
Stepchild adoption by same-sex couples	
Joint adoption by same-sex couples	
LGBTQ people allowed to serve openly in the military	No (Since 2021)
Right to change legal gender	No
Access to IVF for lesbians	No
Commercial surrogacy for gay male couples	No
MSMs allowed to donate blood	Yes In Guyana, there are currently no restrictions on men who have sex with men donating blood.

== See also ==
- Politics of Guyana
- LGBTQ rights in the Commonwealth of Nations
- LGBTQ rights in the Americas
- LGBTQ rights by country or territory
