= Robert Carr (activist) =

Trinidadian scholar and activist

Robert P. Carr PhD
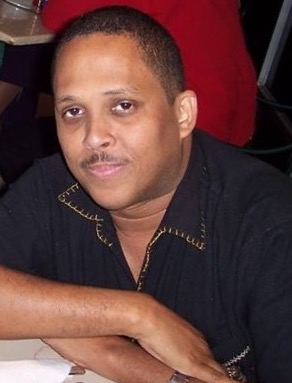
- Carr, circa 2010
- Born: 23 February 1963; Port of Spain, Trinidad, Trinidad and Tobago
- Died: 10 May 2011 (aged 48); Toronto, Canada
- Citizenship: Trinidad and Tobago; Jamaica
- Education: Johns Hopkins University (BA); University of Maryland at College Park (PhD); The University of the West Indies (MSW)
- Occupations: Director, Policy and Advocacy, International Council of AIDS Service Organisations (ICASO); Exec. Director, Jamaica AIDS Support
- Writing career
- Years active: 2000–2011
- Website: robertcarrfund.org

Dr. Robert Carr (23 February 1963 – 10 May 2011) was a Trinidadian (and at the age of 40 became a dual national of Jamaica) scholar and human rights activist who dedicated his life to bringing public attention to issues related to stigma and discrimination against persons living with or affected by HIV/AIDS.

Carr wrote primarily on issues central to vulnerable communities in the Caribbean. The focus of Carr's publications was the intersectionality of poverty, homophobia, and human rights, and what he recognized as their role in producing and perpetuating systemic sexually based violence and inadequate global, regional, and Jamaican responses to HIV/AIDS. Toronto-based International Council of AIDS Service Organisations (ICASO) established the Robert Carr Award to honour his contributions to ending AIDS.

== Early life and education ==
Carr was born in St. James, Port-of-Spain, Trinidad, on Carnival Saturday. His mother, June Carr, was a school teacher, and his father, Peter Carr, was a public health official with the UN World Health Organization.

At the age of seven, Robert and his older sister, Carolyn, moved to Jamaica in April 1970 because their father accepted a position with the United Nations Pan American Health Organization. This move brought Robert in closer contact with the Jamaican side of his family. He attended Meadowbrook Primary School and in 1974 went on to Meadowbrook High School where he stayed until 1980. Still a student at Meadowbrook High School, Carr pursued a part-time course in Poetry and Play Writing at the University of the West Indies (UWI), Mona Campus, in Jamaica. There he not only attended classes, but wrote a play and poetry that was published in the university's official publication, Focus.

He moved to Maryland in 1981, just before his 18th birthday, to begin his post-secondary and university education. He attended Johns Hopkins University for his Bachelor's Degree in Arts and then the University of Maryland (College Park) for his Master's and Doctorate Degrees specializing in African-American Literature.

From 1988 to 1998 Carr lived in Washington DC. In 1994, he completed his Doctorate Degree in Philosophy (English).

In September 1998, his post-graduate education continued at the St. Augustine Campus of the University of the West Indies in Trinidad, where he completed a one-year Diploma in Social Work, graduating with distinction. He then returned to Jamaica and enrolled in the Master's in Social Work program at the Mona Campus of The UWI, where in 2002 he again graduated with distinction.

== Career ==
In 1992 Carr became an Assistant Professor with the Department of English at George Mason University, where he taught until June 1997. He introduced new courses on black literature, and published numerous articles as a subaltern scholar on issues affecting developing countries.

His academic focus, however, soon shifted to social studies and social work. Before graduation from UWI in 2001, Carr became Coordinator of the Research and Development Working Group at Jamaica Network of Seropositives (JN+). Between 2002 and 2004, he was also a part-time lecturer with the UWI Mona's Faculty of Social Sciences and taught a Quantitative Research Method course. From 2006 to 2008, he served as the Coordinator of the Graduate Program's Unit at the Caribbean Institute of Media and Communication.

Carr went on to serve as a member of the UNAIDS Reference Group on HIV and Human Rights and of the nongovernmental organization delegation to the UNAIDS Programme Coordinating Board, and "joined with other global advocates to found the Global Forum on MSM & HIV (MSMGF). He acted as a panelist for numerous Congressional Briefings in Washington, D.C., worked with the LGBT Caucus and assisted with high-level meetings at the United Nations, as well as countless other global policy arenas." Towards the end of his career, he served as Policy and Advocacy Director of the International Council of AIDS Service Organizations.

=== Jamaica AIDS Support for Life (JASL) ===
Between late 2001 and mid 2002 Carr worked with the United Kingdom's International HIV/AIDS Alliance and the Jamaica Ministry of Health as a Program Planning Consultant to Jamaica AIDS Support for Life (JASL), providing technical assistance to JASL in the areas of program development and human resource management. His consulting work paved the way for a permanent opportunity with JASL as the Director of Targeted Interventions, and by November 2002, "he became Executive Director of Jamaica AIDS Support for Life, a national NGO serving Jamaican society's most disenfranchised populations, including prisoners, the hearing impaired, people who use drugs, sex workers, transgender people, and gay and other men who have sex with men."

=== The Caribbean Vulnerable Communities Coalition (CVC) ===
By 2005, Carr "co-founded and was the first Executive Director of the Caribbean Vulnerable Communities Coalition (CVC), one of the first Caribbean organizations to focus on issues related to the rights and needs of sexual minorities." He originally established the coalition "[i]n response to a lack of access to HIV and health services in Jamaica,""reaching out to colleagues in Jamaica, Trinidad, St. Lucia and beyond. In December 2004 a call went out to civil society actors attending a meeting of UNAIDS in Montego Bay, Jamaica. They [sic] call was for them to first get together in Kingston to talk about the concerns and the possibility of creating a network of some kind. The meeting included representatives from the Eastern Caribbean, Haiti, Dominican Republic, Trinidad, Curacao, - a cross-section of the French, English, Spanish and Dutch speaking Caribbean. The participants agreed to create a forum through which they could combine efforts. They understood that it would go a far way to help create the political space for the views and voices of the key populations to be heard."

The CVC operates as "a network of indigenous frontline service providers working on rights-based programming with marginalized groups across the Caribbean." Today, several aspects of the organization's work include helping to strengthen the Caribbean Sex Worker Coalition, collaborating with the Caribbean Forum for Liberation and Acceptance of Genders and Sexualities and supporting burgeoning transgender groups in different countries."

=== Global Forum on MSM & HIV (MSMGF) ===
"In 2006, Robert joined with other global advocates to found the Global Forum on MSM & HIV (MSMGF) in recognition of the lack of attention to gay men and other MSM in the global HIV epidemic." At the MSMGF, Carr served as a mentor – "not just for the organization, but to other activists from emerging MSM regional networks throughout the world."

== Activism ==
Carr also felt that while targeted programs must address the issues of education, economics, health and wellbeing for vulnerable populations, the enabling environment that drove their marginalization—what he saw as "a constant assault on the humanity of gay and bisexual people from elected officials, homophobic dance hall artists, and religious leaders who believe that gay rights are against God's will"—must also be changed to facilitate their advancement. He therefore worked with his dedicated team of activists to dismantle the homophobic attitudes and promote the establishment of a safer, more inclusive environment as a key component of their programs, particularly as it related to the national legal and policy frameworks that supported this marginalization. His work as a human rights activist not only embraced this need for legislative and policy changes to remove discrimination and stigma but also the establishment of specific programs managed by marginalized groups to empower them and address their health and social needs. Including health and social needs directly tied to a legacy of violence:

'There were no treatments available in the Caribbean [initially...], so AIDS really was a death sentence. You had people with Kaposi's sarcoma, people with violent diarrhea, who were just wasting away and then dying in really horrible and traumatic ways.' The terror induced by these deaths, combined with an already intense local culture of homophobia [produced] a violent backlash. 'To call what was going on here "stigma and discrimination" was really an understatement. In the ghettos they were putting tires around people who had AIDS and lighting the tires on fire. They were killing gay people because they thought AIDS was contagious. It was a very extreme environment, and really horrible things were happening.'

Carr brought human rights activists together to formulate strategic plans to establish a Caribbean regional organization of vulnerable groups to strengthen their role as advocates, to empower them to address their priority health problems and to change the political, legal, economic and social environment that reinforces their persistent marginalization through stigma and discrimination, reinforcing, "'[t]he change has to come from within; it really has to be Caribbean people taking a stand against this kind of violence and abuse, and against...misinformed, emotionally based, irresponsible attempts at policy making.'" They held meetings in the sanctity of Carr's home and other safe spaces to create the Caribbean Vulnerable Communities Coalition (CVC) working with key allies to establish the legal, administrative structure and functions as well as funding mechanisms so that the Coalition became a sustainable reality.

In 2004, Carr and his colleagues began a social change campaign to break the silence on violence against men who have sex with men in Jamaica, stimulate public dialogue and change the institutional attitudes and behaviours. The programme approach used by Carr and his colleagues has included interpersonal communication, institutional communication, mass media and other traditional information, education and communication tools. Carr has used media interventions, a dedicated website page with resources, radio and television public service announcements, key spokespersons and research.

Carr's regional and global reputation and his ability to relate to CARICOM, International Funding Agencies and United Nations agencies such as UNAIDS, UNFPA, UNIFEM and UNDP gave the Coalition critical funding for its strategic objectives; writing,

My focus is HIV/AIDS which most dramatically infects and affects the poor in the Caribbean... I straddle the poles of helping those on the ground stay in their homes, find the hope that is medically proven to prolong and improve the quality of their lives, even as I battle with the donor agencies whose policies are set in the metropoles and who all too often find their hands tied by right-wing politics that dominate the West. As I listen to the subaltern speak in my office on a daily basis and tell me of their imminent eviction, of their abandonment by family, their struggle to afford unaffordable blood tests and treatment regimes, the reality of subaltern studies is woven into the warp and woof of my daily life.

Because of his advocacy at international conferences and at meetings of the UNAIDS Reference groups on HIV and Human Rights, other working groups, and advisory committees he was able to raise concerns about the urgency of addressing the needs of vulnerable populations across all nations as part of a global strategy. His presentations at international meetings included his famous "Bullshit Address" presentation in Vienna in July 2010 during closing remarks at the Plenary Session MSMG Forum Pre- Conference Meeting to the International AIDS Conference in Vienna, Austria (You Tube: The Global forum on MSM & HIV: Part 5: Closing Plenary; Robert Carr; Vienna July 2010). Carr became a global champion of the rights of vulnerable populations and worked with international agencies to promote human rights and access to critical services.

He was also strong promoter of gender issues: many of his publications reflected his concern over the marginalization of women in society.

== Writing and scholarship ==
"The author of several books, Dr. Carr wrote extensively on human rights and HIV, as well as on the social context that drives stigma and discrimination." He was "widely recognized as one of the world's leading researchers on cultural forces and the unfolding of the AIDS pandemic." Described as a part of "a new generation of Caribbean and African descent intellectuals who form part of a larger formation of New World black intellectuals[,] two of the central themes of Carr's work—how geographical relationships of power have shaped the politics and the history of the New World and how black subjects have located themselves within those geographies of power[—]offer[ed] new models of interdisciplinary and cross-cultural analysis for both African American and Caribbean studies."

Carr's doctoral thesis was the basis for his first book, Black Nationalism in the New World: Readings in the African American and West Indian Experience in 2002. The book was part of the Latin America Otherwise Series published by Duke University to give a "new dimension to the concept of subalternity by linking, on the one hand, the history of colonial India to the colonial history of slavery in the Caribbean and in the United States, and on the other, by showing that colonial subalternity, as it has been defined by the South Asian Studies collective, always has a 'color'."

As an academic, Carr believed in the power of research to drive policies and programs. In addition to pioneering studies on the vulnerable populations that were the focus of his organizations' intervention programs, he was committed "to translating findings from research collaborations between community and academic partners into tangible policy development and advocacy efforts."

He also published numerous papers, journal articles, and book chapters on HIV vulnerability issues.

== Death ==
On 10 May 2011, at the age of 48, Carr died suddenly from arrhythmia of the heart at his residence in Toronto, Canada. Ceremonies to honour his life and work were held in Toronto, New York, Jamaica and Trinidad.

== Published works ==
=== Books ===
- Barrow, Christine, Marjan De. Bruin, and Robert Carr, eds. Sexuality, Social Exclusion & Human Rights: Vulnerability in the Caribbean Context of HIV. Kingston: Ian Randle, 2009. Print.
- Carr, Robert. Black Nationalism in the New World: Reading the African-American and West Indian Experience. Durham: Duke University Press, 2003. Print.
- Rabasa, José, Javier Sanjines, and Robert Carr, eds. Subaltern Studies in the Americas, special issue of dispositio/n: American Journal of Cultural Histories and Theories, 46 (Ann Arbor: University of Michigan Press, 1996). Print.
- Waring, Marilyn, Robert Carr, Meena Shivdas, and Anit Mukherjee. Who Cares?: The Economics of Dignity. London: Commonwealth Secretariat, 2011. Print.

=== Book chapters ===
- Carr, Robert. "Citizenship and Subalternity of the Voice within Globalization: Dilemmas of the Public Sphere, Civil Society and Human Rights in the Periphery." Caribbean Culture: Soundings on Kamau Braithwaite. Ed. Annie Paul. N.p.: University of the West Indies, 2006. 403. Print.
- Carr, Robert. "Crossing the First World/Third World Divides: Testimonial, Transnational Feminisms, and the Postmodern Condition." Scattered Hegemonies: Postmodernity and Transnational Feminist Practices. Ed. Inderpal Grewal and Caren Kaplan. Minneapolis: University of Minnesota, 1994. 153–72. Print.
- Carr, Robert, Peter R. Carr, and J. Peter Figueroa. "Jamaica." The HIV Pandemic: Local and Global Implications. Ed. Eduard J. Beck, Nicholas Mays, and Alan W. Whiteside. Oxford University Press, 2006. 404. Print.
- Uganda. Commonwealth Secretariat. "Financing HIV and AIDS Interventions: Implications for Gender Equality." By Robert Carr. Small Change or Real Change?: Commonwealth Perspectives on Financing Gender Equality. London: Commonwealth Secretariat, 2008. 145–71. Print. DOI: https://dx.doi.org/10.14217/9781848590274-14-en

=== Monographs ===
- Jamaica. Child Development Agency. Ministry of Health. National Plan of Action for Orphans and Other Children Made Vulnerable by HIV/AIDS in Jamaica. By Robert Carr. Kingston: Child Development Agency, 2003. UNICEF. UNICEF Jamaica. Web. April 2017.

=== Journal articles ===
- Carr, Robert. "The New Man in the Jungle: Chaos, Community, and the Margins of the Nation-State." Callaloo, vol. 18, no. 1, 1995, pp. 133–156.
- Carr, Robert. "On Judgements: Poverty, Sexuality-Based Violence and Human Rights in 21st Century Jamaica." The Caribbean Journal of Social Work 2.7 (2003): 71–87.
- Carr, Robert, and R. Anthony Lewis. "Gender, Sexuality and Exclusion: Sketching the Outlines of the Jamaican Popular Nationalist Project." Caribbean Review of Gender Studies 3 (2009): n.p. Web. 20 April 2017.
- Carr, Robert. "Stigmas, Gender and Coping: A Study of HIV+ Jamaicans". Race, Gender & Class, vol. 9, no. 1, 2002, pp. 122–144., www.jstor.org/stable/41675010.
- Carr, Robert. "STRUGGLES FROM THE PERIPHERY: SISTREN AND THE POLITICS OF SUBALTERN AUTOBIOGRAPHY". Dispositio, vol. 19, no. 46, 1994, pp. 127–145., www.jstor.org/stable/41491509.
- Carr, Robert, and R. Anthony Lewis. "'Disposable Populations': The CSME, HIV and AIDS." Race & Class 49.2 (2007): 85–91.
- Carr, Robert, and R. Anthony Lewis. "Caribbean: Birth of a Regional Network Responding to HIV/AIDS and Vulnerability." HIV AIDS Policy Law Rev. 10.1 (2005): 43–44. Web. 20 April 2017.
- Carr, Robert (1987) "Divine Construct and the Individual Will: Swedenborgian Theology in The Book of Thel," Colby Quarterly: Vol. 23 : Issue 2, Article 5.
- Norman, Lisa R., Robert Carr, and Julio Jiménez. "Sexual Stigma and Sympathy: Attitudes toward Persons Living with HIV in Jamaica." Culture, Health & Sexuality 8.5 (2006): 423–33. Web. 20 April 2017.
- Norman, L. R., R. Carr, and C. Uche. "The Role of Sympathy on Avoidance Intention toward Persons Living with HIV/AIDS in Jamaica." AIDS Care 18.8 (2006): 1032–039. Web. 20 April 2017.
- Norman, L. R., R. Carr, C. Uche, and Y. Gebre. "Stigmatizing attitudes of the University students towards persons living with HIV/AIDS in Jamaica." West Indian Medical Journal 54(Suppl 230) (2005): 30. Web. 20 April 2017.
- Norman, Lisa R., and Robert Carr. "Discriminatory Attitudes Toward Persons Living With HIV/AIDS in Jamaica: A Hierarchical Analysis of University Students." AIDS and Public Policy Journal 20 (Spring/Summer 2005): 40–50. Web. 20 April 2017.
- Norman, Lisa R., and Robert Carr. "The Role of HIV Knowledge on HIV-related Behaviours: A Hierarchical Analysis of Adults in Trinidad." Health Education 103.3 (2003): 145–55. Web. 20 April 2017.
- Trapence, Gift et al. (2012) "From personal survival to public health: community leadership by men who have sex with men in the response to HIV." The Lancet, Volume 380, Issue 9839, 400–410.
- White, Ruth C., and Robert Carr. "Homosexuality and HIV/AIDS Stigma in Jamaica." Culture, Health & Sexuality 7.4 (2005): 347–59. Web. 20 April 2017.

== See also ==
- UNAIDS
- Human rights in Jamaica
- LGBT rights in Jamaica
