= Jamaica Coalition on the Rights of the Child =

The Jamaica Coalition on the Rights of the Child (JCRC) is a UNICEF-sponsored program in Jamaica for protection of children's rights. JCRC works to monitor and implement the United Nations Convention on the Rights of the Child nationally in Jamaica. The Coalition was established in November 1989.

The JCRC's mission is to facilitate and monitor the implementation of the Convention, educate the public about its provisions and the rights of children, and assist Jamaican social service organizations in their implementation of the Convention. JCRC also lobbies the Jamaican government to support the mission and provisions of the Convention on the Rights of the Child in government plans and policies, and supports legislation focused on these goals.

== See also ==
- Jamaicans for Justice, includes child rights
