= Carolyn Gomes =

Jamaican human rights activist

- Born: March 30, 1958 (age 67); Kingston, Jamaica
- Occupation: Human rights activist

The Honourable Carolyn Gomes, O.J. (born 30 March 1958 in Kingston, Jamaica) is a Jamaican human rights activist. She is also the co-founder and now the past executive director of Jamaicans for Justice. Gomes resigned as the executive director of Jamaicans for Justice due to controversy surrounding the JFJ introducing sex education material into a number of private children's homes in Jamaica that was deemed inappropriate. Since 2014 Carolyn Gomes has been serving as the executive director of Caribbean Vulnerable Communities Coalition (CVC).

Carolyn is medical doctor, she got her MB and BS degree from the West Indies in 1980. She then continued her education in United Kingdom and specialized in Pediatrics.She stopped her practice to become executive director of Jamaicans For Justice.

Executive Director of Caribbean Vulnerable Communities Coalition (CVC) since January 2014

On 10 December 2008, Gomes received the prestigious United Nations Prize in the Field of Human Rights. On 19 October of the next year, she was honored with the Order of Jamaica, in recognition of her advocacy for human rights.
