= Society Against Sexual Orientation Discrimination =

Guyanese LGBTQ Rights organization

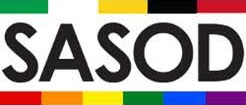
- Abbreviation: SASOD
- Formation: 2003
- Type: Non-profit
- Purpose: LGBTQ Rights in Guyana
- Headquarters: Georgetown, Guyana
- Key people: Joel Simpson (Managing Director)
- Website: http://www.sasod.org.gy/
- Formerly called: Students Against Sexual Orientation Discrimination

The Society Against Sexual Orientation Discrimination (SASOD) is an LGBTQ rights organisation based in Georgetown, Guyana.

== Founding ==
In 2001, while reviewing the constitution of Guyana, the National Assembly unanimously voted to amend it to outlaw discrimination based on sexual orientation. Under pressure from religious groups, the president, Bharrat Jagdeo, refused to sign the bill.

In 2003, as the National Assembly again considered the amendment, a group of University of Guyana students founded Students Against Sexual Orientation Discrimination. Their first event was a forum held at the National Library during which SASOD lobbied members of parliament to pass the amendment to outlaw sexual orientation discrimination. SASOD's founders included then law student Joel Simpson, who has subsequently been a key leader of SASOD for at least 20 years.

== Advocacy and activities ==
=== Painting the Spectrum Film Festival ===
In 2005, SASOD started the Painting the Spectrum Film Festival, an annual festival dedicated to films highlighting the LGBTQ community. As of 2008, this was the only such film festival in the English-speaking Caribbean. In 2020, the festival was held virtually due to COVID-19.

=== Repeal of Cross-dressing law ===
In February 2009, Guyanese police arrested several transgender people for "wearing of female attire by men", which was illegal under Chapter 8:02 of the Laws of Guyana, section 153 (1) (xlvii) of the Summary Jurisdiction (Offences) Act. The detainees alleged mistreatment and violations of their rights by the police. Acting Chief Magistrate Melissa Robertson fined them and admonished them to "give their lives to Jesus Christ".

In response, SASOD co-signed a letter condemning the arrests and mistreatment to Guyanese President Jagdeo. Other signatories included Human Rights Watch, Global Rights, and Guyana Rainbow Foundation.

Additionally, SASOD and four of the former detainees filed a lawsuit in the High Court of Guyana challenging the constitutionality of the cross-dressing law. In 2013, the High Court decided that "cross-dressing can be deemed a criminal offense only if engaged in for improper purposes" and awarded $40,000 to each plaintiff for the police misconduct; however, the Court declined to rule the law unconstitutional. In response to the ruling, SASOD warned that Transgender citizens “will continue to be vulnerable to human rights abuses with this dubious decision."

The plaintiffs appealed to the Court of Appeal which upheld the lower court's decision. They appealed again, and in 2018 the Caribbean Court of Justice struck down the law. SASOD called the decision "a victory for human rights and justice in the Caribbean."

=== UN Reports ===
Beginning in 2010, SASOD contributed to Guyana's Universal Periodic Review (UPR) by the United Nations Human Rights Council (UNHRC). SASOD called for the elimination of laws that discriminate against same-sex relationships between consenting adults, as well as improving access to health care for LGBT persons.

In July 2012, SASOD along with partner organizations, submitted a shadow report to Convention on the Elimination of All Forms of Discrimination against Women (CEDAW) summarizing the discrimination and harassment experienced by lesbian, bisexual, and transgender women in Guyana.

Later, in January 2013, SASOD submitted a shadow report to the United Nations Committee on the Rights of the Child (CRC), highlighting the need for comprehensive sex and sexuality education in schools, access to sexual health information, and the end of discrimination and abuse based on sexual orientation and gender identity.

=== HIV/AIDS Advocacy ===
In 2011, SASOD opposed a potential law that would criminalize HIV transmission, calling it "misguided, ill-informed, and unenforceable." Ultimately, the law was not adopted.

In 2014, SASOD was awarded with the Red Ribbon Award for outstanding community leadership on AIDS in the "Advocacy and human rights" category.

SASOD has promoted the use of PrEP as an HIV prevention tool. In 2018, they conducted focus groups with MSM and transgender people regarding their attitudes towards and awareness of PrEP. A key finding from their report was that 60% of participants had never heard of PrEP. In 2019, they partnered with a private clinic to provide PrEP services.

SASOD has called out anti-LGBTQ attitudes and Guyana's laws against gay sex and sex work as barriers to HIV prevention. However, SASOD has celebrated the government's progress in providing HIV services, including HIV self-testing and national treatment centers.

=== Pride Parade ===
In 2018, SASOD, the Guyana Rainbow Foundation, and Guyana Trans United organized Guyana's first Pride Parade in Georgetown. The event was attended by parliament member Priya Manickchand. Despite opposition from some religious leaders and social media users, the parade happened without incident.

Since 2018, SASOD has continued to assist in organizing the annual parade and pride festival.

=== Guyana Together ===
In 2023, SASOD launched the "Guyana Together" campaign to promote LGBTQ rights in Guyana. The first phase will focus on public education and lobbying for the appeal of laws against gay sex. The second phase will focus on adding "sexual orientation", "gender identity" and "gender expression" to the Prevention of Discrimination Act. The campaign has been endorsed by more than 60 local organizations, including the Rotary Club of Georgetown.

== Opposition ==
Opposition to SASOD's activities and positions has frequently originated in the Guyanese religious community. In 2010, the Inter-Religious Organisation (IRO) of Guyana held a press conference to oppose the SASOD's annual film festival, Painting the Spectrum, on the grounds that it promotes "homosexual behavior" among youth. In their statement, the IRO referred to LGBTQ rights as "western culture" and warned that allowing LGBTQ rights in Guyana would be "a new form of colonialism". Others have opposed SASOD's legal case against Guyana's cross-dressing law.

In 2018, some Christian leaders and social media users denounced Guyana's first pride parade organized by SASOD and other local LGBTQ organizations. Later that year, 100 Christian leaders sponsored an advertisement opposing efforts led by SASOD to repeal laws against gay sex.

== Awards ==
- Red Ribbon Award (2014)

== See also ==
- LGBT rights in Guyana
