= Jamaicans for Justice =

Jamaicans for Justice (JFJ) is a non-profit, non-partisan human rights organization in Jamaica. JFJ was founded in 1999 in Kingston, Jamaica. The group was co-founded by Jamaican human rights activist Dr. Carolyn Gomes who in 2008 was awarded the United Nations Prize in the Field of Human Rights. The organization is most widely known for providing legal support to hundreds of victims of state abuse in Jamaica and litigation of human rights issues before Jamaican and international tribunals.

== Origin ==
Jamaican for Justice (JFJ) arose out of the Gas Riots of 16 April 1999. On 19 August 1999 four months after the riots, JFJ came into being. On 15 October, it was officially a legal entity. The founders of JFJ saw strong need for a human rights action group to address the frustrations of the Jamaican people and the systemic abuse by the security forces. These frustrations included many instances of alleged corruption in the public sphere, apparent miscarriages of Justice in the judicial system and imbalances in the socio-economic system. Since its formation, JFJ has also developed working relationships with Amnesty International, USAID Jamaica, The Carter Center, Article 21, Street Law, CEJIL and the Inter-American Commission on Human Rights.

== Notable cases ==
JFJ has represented hundreds of low-income victims of state abuse, leading a number of campaigns in high-profile cases.

- Police beating death of twenty-six-year-old Michael Gayle. Gayle, who was mentally ill, died on 23 August 1999 of injuries he sustained after attempting to pass through a police and army road block two days earlier. He was subjected to such a severe beating by police and army officers that he suffered a traumatic rupture of his stomach lining.
- Police Killing of the Braeton Seven in March 2001. The police, under questionable circumstances shot and killed Reagon Beckford, 14; Christopher Grant, 17; Dane Whyte, 19; Tamoya Wilson, 20; Andre Virgo, 20; Lancebert Clarke, 19; and Curtis Smith, 20. The police officers were charged with murder and later acquitted.
- 13-year-old Janice Allen was killed controversially in a crossfire between police and gunmen in April 2000.
- JFJ have called for a thorough police investigation of the murder of cross-dressing teenager, Dwayne Jones, in summer 2013.

== Child rights ==
The protection of the rights of children in the care of the Jamaican state has been an issue of concern for JFJ since 2001 but came to the fore in 2003 when citizens began to bring problems concerning children to the attention of the organisation. Since that time, JFJ has actively monitored the situation of wards of the state in children’s homes, places of safety, lock-up, remand and correctional facilities to gather data, provide reports and lobby vigorously for the protection of Jamaica’s most vulnerable citizens.

== Leadership ==
JFJ was co-founded and led for over a decade by prominent activist Dr. Carolyn Gomes, who was awarded the 2008 United Nations Prize in the Field of Human Rights. In 2016, criminologist and civil society organizer Horace Levy was appointed as executive director. Levy retired in December, 2017 and was succeeded by Rodjé Malcolm. Mickel Jackson is the current executive director, assuming office in October 2021.
