= Batty boy =

Slur in Jamaican Patois

In Jamaican Patois, batty boy (also batty bwoy), batty man (also battyman/batiman), and chi chi bwoy/man is a slur often used to refer to a gay or effeminate man. Batiman is also used in Belize owing to the popularity of Jamaican music there. The term derives from the Jamaican slang word batty, which refers to buttocks. As a slur, it is considered offensive.

Certain forms of Jamaican music feature both homophobic and extremely violent themes. One such example of this is the 1992 dancehall hit "Boom Bye Bye" by Buju Banton which contains lyrics that advocate the killing of gay men though Banton has distanced himself from the song and has pulled the song from streaming services. The pejorative chi chi man forms the title of a T.O.K. song about killing gay men and setting them on fire; it was the Jamaican Labour Party's 2001 theme song. In the following year, the People's National Party similarly based their slogan "Log On to Progress" on Elephant Man's track "Log On" which likewise features some violent and homophobic lyrics (e.g., "step pon chi chi man", i.e., "stomp on a faggot").

British comedian Sacha Baron Cohen frequently used the expression in his Ali G character, including in a 2002 interview that led to an apology by the BBC for Cohen's foul language.

== See also ==
- Stop Murder Music
- LGBT rights in Jamaica
- LGBT rights in the Caribbean
