= LGBTQ people in Australia =

Australia is one of the most LGBTQ-friendly countries in the world. In a 2019 Pew Research poll, 81% of Australians agreed that homosexuality should be accepted by society, making it the eighth most supportive country in the survey behind Sweden (94%, most supportive country), Germany, France, UK (all 86%), and Canada (85%). With a long history of LGBTQ rights activism and an annual three-week-long Mardi Gras festival, Sydney is considered one of the most gay-friendly cities in the world.

== Terminology ==
More inclusive terms such as LGBTQ or LGBTI are increasingly used in Australia, rather than just LGBT, with the Q denoting queer people and the I denoting intersex people. Organisations that include intersex people as well as LGBT people include the National LGBTI Health Alliance and community media. Also used are the terms LGBTQI and LGBTQIA, with the A denoting asexual people.

== Demographics ==
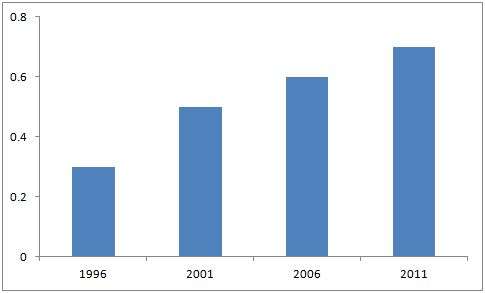
Percentages of same-sex couples according to the Census of Population and housing

In 2022, around 910,600 people or 4.5% of Australians aged 16 years and over identify as LGBTI+. The population is predominantly young, with 59.4% of LGBTI+ people aged between 16–34 years and only 7.8% aged 65 years and older. Around 80.9% or 738,800 people identify as gay, lesbian, bisexual or another term for their sexual orientation. Around 20.1% or 178,900 people identify as transgender and gender diverse. Around 7.0% or 63,300 people were born with variations of sex characteristics.

=== Same-sex couples ===
In 2011, same-sex couples accounted for 0.7% of the total number of couples, or around 33,700 same-sex couples. It increased to 0.9% in the 2016 Census, with a total of around 46,800 same-sex couples. In 2016, there were 23,700 male same-sex couples and 23,000 female same-sex couples. The pattern of more male than female same-sex couples has been consistent since 1996, although the degree of difference has decreased in each census, more significantly in the 2016 Census.

In 2016, same-sex couples accounted for 1.4% of all couples in the Australian Capital Territory, the highest proportion of any state or territory. However, only 2.6% of all same-sex couples in Australia lived in the Australian Capital Territory. The next highest proportions were in New South Wales and Victoria, where same-sex couples accounted for 1.0% of all couples. Almost two-thirds (63%) of same-sex couples lived in New South Wales (35.8%) or Victoria (27.1%), whereas only 0.8% lived in the Northern Territory and 1.8% in Tasmania.

The 2016 Census noted that Aboriginal and Torres Strait Islander people are more likely to live with a same-sex partner than non-Indigenous people. About 1.2% of Aboriginal and Torres Strait Islander people lived with a same-sex partner, while that of non-Indigenous people was 0.9%.

In 2021, same-sex couples accounted for 1.4% of the total number of couples, or 78,425 same-sex couples, an increase of 0.9% from the 2016 Census. The 2021 Census counted 39,497 male same-sex couples and 38,927 female same-sex couples.

=== Children growing up in same-sex families ===
The 2011 Australian Census counted 6,300 children living in same-sex families, up from 3,400 in 2001, making up one in a thousand of all children in couple families (0.1%). In 2016, it increased to 10,500 children, accounting for 0.2% of all children in families.

=== Income of same-sex couples ===
Individuals in same-sex relationships were more likely to have higher personal incomes than those in opposite-sex relationships. In 2016, 23% of men in same-sex relationships earned $2,000 or more a week, compared with 18% of men in opposite-sex relationships. For women, the difference was greater. Women in same-sex relationships were twice as likely to be earning $2,000 or more a week as women in opposite-sex relationships (14% compared with 6%).

==== Wage gap ====
An Australian study has shown that gay men earn 13% less than their straight counterparts. Meanwhile, lesbians earn 13% more than straight women. La Nauze, economist at University of Melbourne, noted: "There are grounds for concern that workers in Australia, particularly gay men, are discriminated against because of their sexual orientation."

=== Religious affiliation ===
A 2008 study of LGBTQ Australians found that 35% were raised Protestant, 30% raised Catholic and 29% raised irreligious.

According to the 2016 Census, LGBTQ people were most likely to report they had no religion (57%). However, 32% said they were Christian. This was in contrast to heterosexual people, for whom Christianity was the leading affiliation (59%) followed by not having a religion (28%). Same-sex partners were more likely to be affiliated with Buddhism than those in opposite-sex relationships (3.9% compared to 2.7%) and less likely to be affiliated with Hinduism (0.5% compared with 2.4%) or Islam (0.7% compared with 2.4%).

In 2021, 63.9% of people in same-sex couples reported no religion, significantly higher than the reported rate by people in all couple relationships (37.6%). The rate of people in same-sex couples affiliated with Christianity decreased to 26.9%. The number of same-sex partners affiliated with other religions slightly increased from 6.5% in 2016 to 7.0% in 2021, while not stated decreased from 2.8% in 2016 to 1.7% in 2021.

Religion	Percent of same-sex couples affiliated
No religion	63.9%
Christianity	26.9%
Other religions	7.0%
Not stated	1.7%

== History ==
Queer Indigenous Australian history is little-known, with limited evidence of formal structures or roles except in the Tiwi Islands.

== Rights ==
As a federation, Australia's states and territories are responsible for many laws affecting LGBTQ and intersex rights. Between 1975 and 1997, the states and territories progressively repealed anti-homosexuality laws that dated back to the colonial era. Since 2016, each jurisdiction has an equal age of consent for all sexual acts. All jurisdictions offer expungement schemes to clear the criminal records of people charged or convicted for consensual sexual acts that are no longer illegal.

Beginning on 12 September 2017, a national plebiscite titled "Should the law be changed to allow same-sex couples to marry?" was commenced. 61.6% of total votes were in support of the legalisation of same-sex marriage, leading to Australia recognising same-sex marriage on 9 December 2017. States and territories began granting domestic partnership benefits and relationship recognition to same-sex couples from 2003 onwards, with federal law recognising same-sex couples since 2009 as de facto relationships. Alongside marriage, same-sex relationships may be recognised by states or territories in various ways, including through civil unions, domestic partnerships, registered relationships and/or as unregistered de facto relationships.

LGBTQ adoption and parenting in Australia is legal nationwide, with the Northern Territory the last jurisdiction to pass an adoption equality law in March 2018. Discrimination on the basis of sexual orientation and gender identity or expression is prohibited in every state and territory, with concurrent federal protections for sexual orientation, gender identity and intersex status since 1 August 2013.

Transgender rights in Australia and intersex rights in Australia vary between jurisdictions, with only NSW since 1996 legally still requiring a person to undergo sex reassignment surgery before changing the legal sex on birth certificates Non-binary Australians can legally register a "non-specific" sex on federal legal documents and in the records of some states and territories.

Despite these developments, reports highlighted persistent barriers to accessing gender-affirming healthcare for sistergirls and brotherboys living in remote and regional areas. Several individuals described moving to cities such as Sydney to obtain hormone treatment that was unavailable in their home communities.

=== Summary table ===
LGBT rights in:	Same-sex sexual activity	Historical conviction expungement	Gender recognition	Same-sex relationships	Same-sex adoption and parenting	Anti-discrimination	Gay panic defence abolished	Conversion therapy banned	Gender self-identification	Legal recognition of non-binary gender	Other
Australian Capital Territory	1976 (Legal with equal age of consent)	Yes 2015	Yes	1994 (Domestic partnerships); 2004 (de facto relationships); 2008 (Civil partnerships); 2012 (Civil unions)	2004		Yes 2004	No 2020			Prohibits vilification on grounds of sexual orientation, gender identity or intersex status
Christmas Island	WA law	Yes WA law	Yes WA law	WA law	WA law	WA law	Yes WA law	No WA law	No		Since 1958, subject to WA law
Cocos (Keeling) Islands	WA law	Yes WA law	Yes WA law	WA law	WA law	WA law	Yes WA law	No WA law	No		Since 1992, subject to WA law
New South Wales	1984 (Legal); 2003 (Equal age of consent)	Yes 2015	Yes However requires surgery since 1996, to change sex on a birth certificate	1999 (De facto relationships)	2010	/ No with religious exemptions	Yes 2014	Yes (from April 2025)	(from June 2025)	(from June 2025)	
Norfolk Island	1993	Yes NSW law	Yes NSW law	2006	NSW law	NSW law	Yes NSW law	Yes (from April 2025)			Since 2016, subject to NSW law
Northern Territory	1983 (Legal); 2003 (Equal age of consent)	Yes 2018	Yes	2003 (De facto relationships)	2018		Yes 2006	No	No		
Queensland	1991 (Legal); 2018 (Equal age of consent)	Yes 2018	Yes	2003	2018		Yes 2017	Yes 2020	No		Anti-vilification laws based on sexual orientation and gender identity.
South Australia	1975 (Legal with equal age of consent)	/ 2013 (Can apply to be spent conviction, not true expungement)	Yes	2007 (Domestic partnerships), 2017 (Registered relationships)	Yes 2017		2021	2024	No		
Tasmania	1997 (Legal with equal age of consent)	Yes 2015	Yes	2003 (De facto and registered couples)	2013		Yes 2004	No	No		
(Victoria (state)) Victoria	1981 (Legal with equal age of consent)	Yes 2014	Yes	2001 (De facto relationships)	2016		Yes 2005	Yes 2021			
Western Australia	1990	Yes	Yes	2003	2002		Yes 2008	No	No	No	

== Social conditions ==
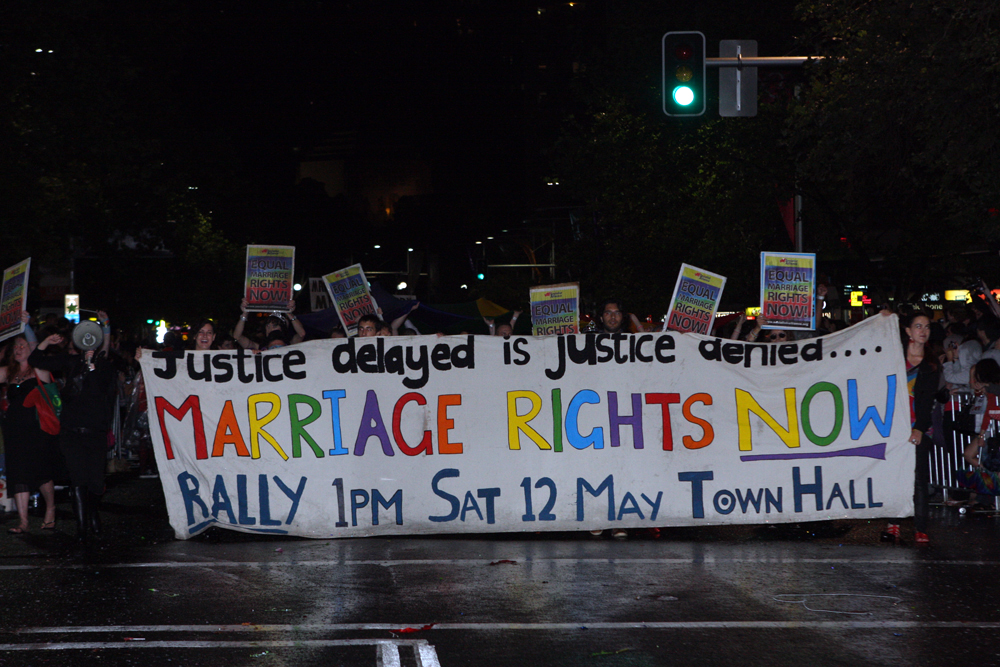
Participants at the Sydney Gay and Lesbian Mardi Gras in 2012

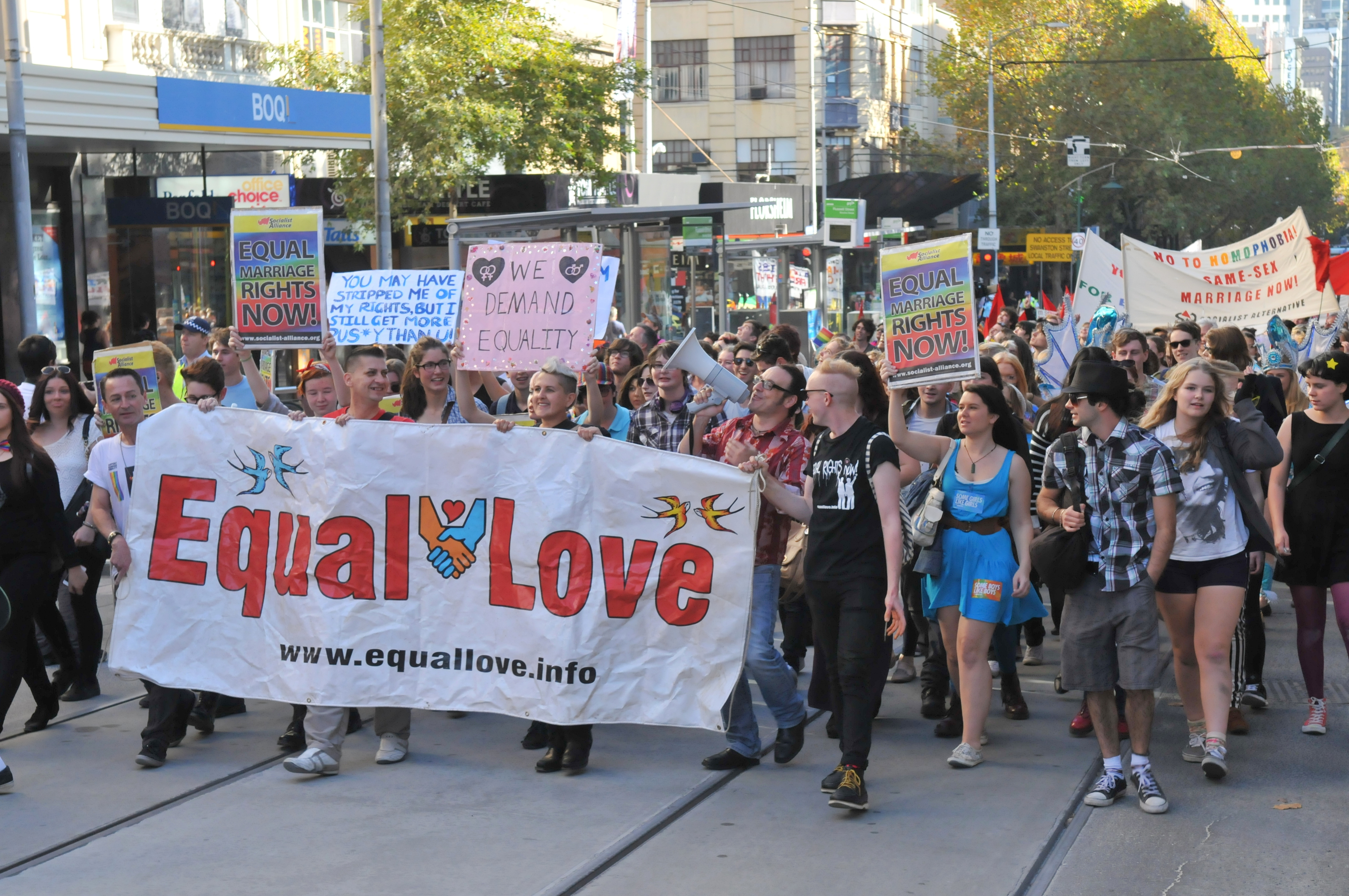
An Equal Love rally in 2013

=== Public attitudes ===
A 2005 paper by the Australia Institute, Mapping Homophobia in Australia, found that 35% of people aged 14 or above considered homosexuality to be immoral, with Queensland and Tasmania having the highest levels of anti-gay sentiment and Victoria the lowest. Overall the most anti-LGBT areas in the study were the Moreton area of country Queensland (excluding the Gold Coast and Sunshine Coast), Central and South-West Queensland and the Burnie/Western district of Tasmania, where 50% considered homosexuality to be immoral, while the least homophobic were inner-city Melbourne (14%), central Perth (21%) and central Melbourne (26%).

A 2018 Ipsos survey of the attitudes towards transgender people in several countries found 71% of Australian respondents thought that the country was becoming more tolerant of transgender people.

=== Indigenous LGBTI community ===
Gender diverse and transgender Aboriginal Australians and Torres Strait Islanders are often referred to as sistergirls and brotherboys. The level of acceptance varies with each community and its elders. In 2015, Dameyon Bonson established Black Rainbow as a mental health support and suicide prevention service for LGBTI Indigenous Australians, given that they often suffer dual discrimination through both racism and homophobia/transphobia, and are 45 times more likely to commit suicide than the general population.

In 2019, SBS News reported on how gender-diverse Aboriginal and Torres Strait Islander people help keep cultural traditions alive while also advocating for greater acceptance. In the Tiwi Islands, sistergirls were reported to have gained recognition through participation in traditionally gender-specific cultural practices, including women's ceremonial dances. Following the deaths of 15 sistergirls by suicide in the early 2000s, a community meeting was held in which sistergirls sought and received permission from Tiwi Elders to perform traditional women's dances. A ceremonial event was held in remembrance of those who had died, marking a turning point in community relations, later they performed also in a competition held in the Sydney Opera House. According to later accounts, no further sistergirl suicides were reported in the community after the ceremony, and the event is described as having significantly improved acceptance and support for sistergirls' gender identity and sexuality among families and community members.

== See also ==
- Archer (magazine)
- Australian Marriage Law Postal Survey
- LGBTIQ+ Health Australia
- LGBTQ culture in Sydney
- LGBTQ rights in Australia
- QNews
- Same-sex marriage in Australia
- Star Observer
- Suicide among LGBTQ people
