= LGBTQ rights in Australia =

- Location of Australia
- Legal status: Same-sex sexual activity always legal for women; legal for men in all states and territories since 1997. Equal age of consent in all states and territories since 2016
- Gender identity: Change of sex recognised in all jurisdictions without surgery requirements
- Military: LGBTQ personnel allowed to serve openly
- Discrimination protections: Federal protections for sexual orientation, gender identity and intersex status since 2013; LGBTQ protections in all state and territory laws

Family rights
- Recognition of relationships: Same-sex marriage since 2017
- Adoption: Equal adoption rights for same-sex couples in all states and territories since 2018 (Note: The Northern Territory and South Australia allow adoption by a single person only if "exceptional circumstances" exist.)

Lesbian, gay, bisexual, transgender, and queer (LGBTQ) rights in Australia rank among the highest in the world; having significantly advanced over the latter half of the 20th century and early 21st century. Opinion polls and the Australian Marriage Law Postal Survey indicate widespread popular support for same-sex marriage within the nation. Australia in 2018, in fact was the last of the Five Eyes set of countries – including Canada (2005), New Zealand (2013), United Kingdom (2014) and the United States (2015) to legalize same-sex marriage. A 2013 Pew Research poll found that 79% of Australians agreed that homosexuality should be accepted by society, making it the fifth-most supportive country surveyed in the world. With its long history of LGBTQ activism and annual Gay and Lesbian Mardi Gras festival, Sydney has been named one of the most gay-friendly cities in the world.

Australia is a federation, with most laws affecting LGBT and intersex rights made by its states and territories. Between 1975 and 1997, the states and territories progressively repealed anti-homosexuality laws that dated back to the colonial era. Since 2016, each jurisdiction has an equal age of consent for all sexual acts. All jurisdictions offer expungement schemes to clear the criminal records of people charged or convicted for consensual sexual acts that are no longer illegal. All jurisdictions of Australia have legally abolished the gay panic defence, based within common law, since 1 April 2021. Since October 2024, conversion therapy is legally banned in jurisdictions representing approximately 85% of the Australian population: Queensland, New South Wales, South Australia, the Australian Capital Territory and Victoria. Since February 2025, extensive and comprehensive federal hate crime legislation explicitly includes “sex, sexual orientation, gender identity and intersex status” – with up to 7 years imprisonment.

Australia legalized same-sex marriage on 9 December 2017. States and territories began granting domestic partnership benefits and relationship recognition to same-sex couples from 2003 onwards, with federal law recognizing same-sex couples since 2009 as de facto relationships. Alongside marriage, same-sex relationships may be recognized by states or territories in various ways, including through civil unions, domestic partnerships, registered relationships and/or as unregistered de facto relationships.

Joint and stepchild same-sex adoption is legal nationwide, with the Northern Territory the last jurisdiction to pass an adoption equality law in March 2018. Discrimination on the basis of sexual orientation and gender identity or expression is prohibited in every state and territory, with concurrent federal protections for sexual orientation, gender identity and intersex status since 1 August 2013. Transgender rights in Australia and intersex rights in Australia vary between jurisdictions. Australians can legally register a "non-specific" sex on federal legal documents and in the records of some states and territories. It was formally announced within September 2024, that the 2026 Australian Census will include optional questions on sexual orientation and gender identity.

== Terminology ==
The term LGBTI is increasingly used in Australia, rather than just LGBT, with the I denoting intersex people. Organisations that include intersex people as well as LGBT people include the National LGBTI Health Alliance and community media. Also used are the terms LGBTQI, and LGBTQIA, with the A denoting asexual people, and Q queer people. According to the 2020 Commonwealth Style Manual, Australian government agencies use both the LGBTI and LGBTIQ+ initialisms, with "SOGIESC" (sexual orientation, gender identity and expression, and sex characteristics) used by writers in relation to legal and policy issues.

== Legality of same-sex sexual activity ==
=== Colonial and 20th century persecution ===
As part of the British Empire, Australian colonies inherited anti-homosexuality laws such as the Buggery Act 1533. These provisions were maintained in criminal sodomy laws passed by 19th century colonial parliaments, and subsequently by state parliaments after Federation. Same-sex sexual activity between men was considered a capital crime, resulting in the execution of people convicted of sodomy until 1890. The laws also punished sodomy between heterosexual partners, but did not apply to lesbian relationships. Oral sex as well as manual sex, whether heterosexual or homosexual, public or private, were also criminal offences.

Different jurisdictions gradually began to reduce the death penalty for sodomy to life imprisonment, with Victoria the last state to reduce the penalty in 1949. Community debate about decriminalising homosexual activity began in the 1960s, with the first lobby groups Daughters of Bilitis, the Homosexual Law Reform Society and the Campaign Against Moral Persecution formed in 1969 and 1970.

=== Decriminalisation of homosexuality ===
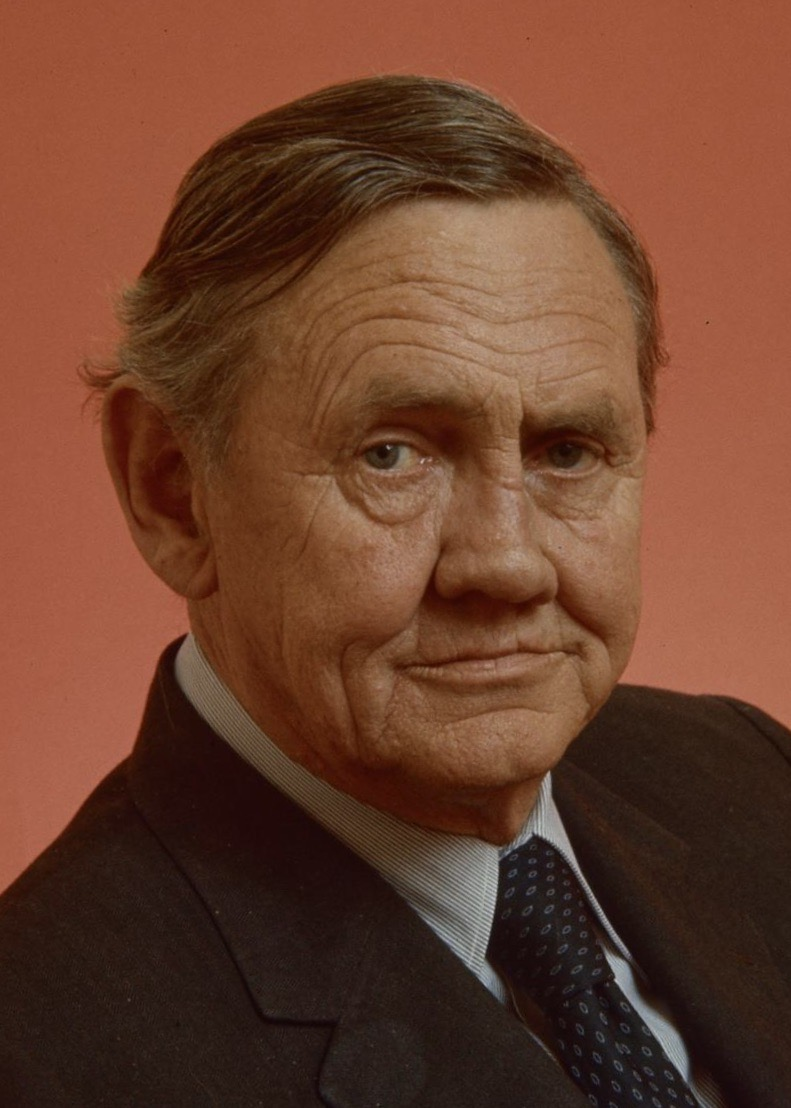
John Gorton

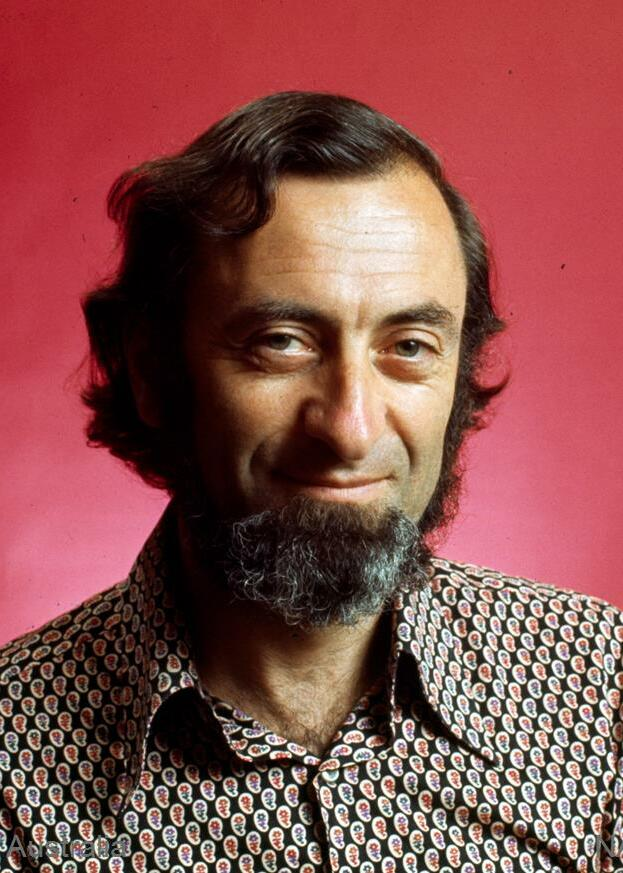
Moss Cass

In October 1973, former Prime Minister John Gorton put forward a motion in the federal House of Representatives, seconded by minister Moss Cass, that "in the opinion of this House homosexual acts between consenting adults in private should not be subject to the criminal law". The Wolfenden report of 1957, which revealed widespread homosexuality in the United Kingdom, was referenced during the debate, as well as high suicide rates amongst the homosexual community at the time. Member for Bennelong Sir John Cramer spoke against the motion, believing it would hasten social decay. All three major parties were given a conscience vote, and the motion was passed by 64 votes to 40.

Motion to decriminalise homosexuality, 18 October 1973
Party	MPs	Votes for	Votes against	Abstained/absent
Labor	66	40: Alfred Ashley-Brown; Adrian Bennett; Fred Birrell; Gordon Bryant; Jim Cairns; Clyde Cameron; Moss Cass; John Coates; Barry Cohen; Frank Crean; Manfred Cross; Kep Enderby; Doug Everingham; Horrie Garrick; Richard Gun; Bill Hayden; Chris Hurford; Ted Innes; Ralph Jacobi; Bert James; Harry Jenkins; Keith Johnson; Les Johnson; John Kerin; Tony Lamb; Race Mathews; David McKenzie; Peter Morris; Bill Morrison; Martin Nicholls; Max Oldmeadow; Frank Olley; Len Reynolds; Ray Sherry; Ray Thorburn; Tom Uren; Laurie Wallis; Bob Whan; Gough Whitlam; Ralph Willis	18: John Armitage; Lance Barnard; Kim Beazley; Lionel Bowen; Rex Connor; Fred Daly; Ron Davies; Frank Doyle; John FitzPatrick; Bill Fulton; Charles Jones; Brendan Hansen; Paul Keating; Len Keogh; Tony Luchetti; Vince Martin; Joe Riordan; Frank Stewart	8: Joe Berinson; Fred Collard; Jim Cope; Gil Duthie; Al Grassby; Richard Klugman; Allan Mulder; Rex Patterson
Liberal	38	18: John Bourchier; Les Bury; Don Cameron; Don Chipp; Peter Drummond; Harry Edwards; Dudley Erwin; John Gorton; David Hamer; Alan Jarman; Bert Kelly; Michael MacKellar; John McLeay; Andrew Peacock; Eric Robinson; Philip Ruddock; Tony Staley; Ian Wilson	13: Robert Bonnett; Marshall Cooke; John Cramer; Nigel Drury; David Fairbairn; Jim Forbes; Bill Graham; Jim Killen; Phillip Lynch; Billy Snedden; Tony Street; Bill Wentworth; Ray Whittorn	7: Max Fox; Malcolm Fraser; Victor Garland; Geoffrey Giles; William McMahon; Harry Turner; Ian Viner
Country	20	6: Doug Anthony; Peter Fisher; Mac Holten; Robert King; Bruce Lloyd; Ian Sinclair	9: James Corbett; John England; John Hallett; Arthur Hewson; Bob Katter; Philip Lucock; Tom McVeigh; Frank O'Keefe; Ian Robinson	5: Evan Adermann; Sam Calder; Ralph Hunt; Don Maisey; Peter Nixon
Total	124 (Note: The House had 125 members, but the Acting Speaker Gordon Scholes was ineligible to vote.)	64	40	20

However, Gorton's motion had no legal effect as the legality of homosexuality was a matter for state governments. Over a 22-year span between 1975 and 1997, the states and territories gradually repealed their sodomy laws as support for gay law reform grew.

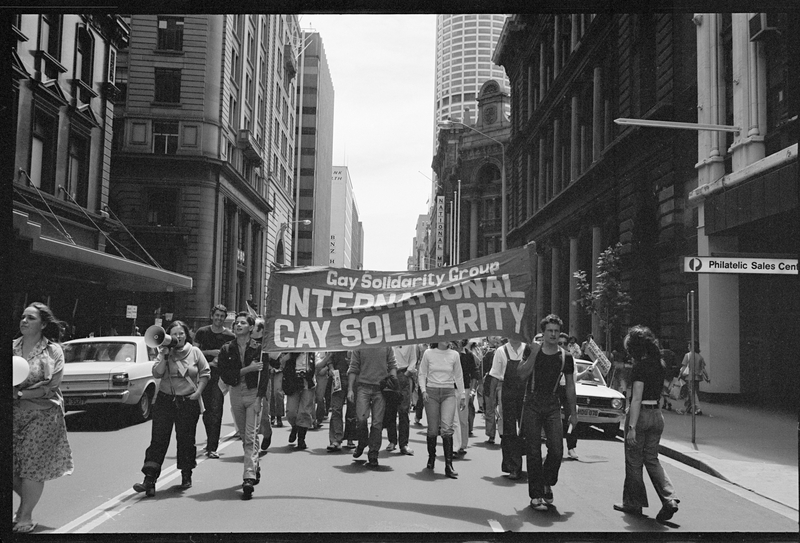
November 1978: Gay Solidarity Group supporters march in the Sydney CBD to protest the Briggs Initiative, which would have effectively banned gay and lesbian teachers in the U.S. state of California.

Following the murder of George Duncan in Adelaide, suspected to have been committed by police officers, there was widespread public outrage in South Australia and calls for male homosexuality to be decriminalized. Premier Don Dunstan had been working quietly behind the scenes for a number of years on the issue, preferring to not be publicly associated with it. Opposition member of the upper house Murray Hill introduced a private members' bill decriminalizing homosexuality. Members were allowed a conscience vote on the bill, however Ren DeGaris moved an amendment in which homosexual activity remained a criminal offence, but provided a legal defence if both men were in private, consenting and over the ages of 21. This law commenced on 9 November 1972.

In 1975, Peter Duncan introduced another private members bill decriminalizing male homosexuality and this bill passed on 17 September 1975, making South Australia the first jurisdiction to decriminalise male homosexual activity from 2 October 1975 when the law took effect.

The Australian Capital Territory's decriminalisation, first proposed in 1973, was approved by the Fraser Federal Government with effect from 8 November 1976. Victoria followed on 1 March 1981, although a "soliciting for immoral purposes" provision added by conservatives saw police harassment continue in that state for some years.

Other jurisdictions to decriminalise male homosexuality were the Northern Territory (1 January 1984), New South Wales (8 June 1984) and (after four failed attempts) Western Australia (23 March 1990). In exchange for decriminalisation, Western Australian conservatives required a higher age of consent and an anti-proselytising provision similar to the United Kingdom's section 28, both repealed in 2002.

Queensland legalised male same-sex activity with effect from 19 January 1991 after the long-standing Nationals government had lost power.

The Tasmanian Government refused to repeal its sodomy law, which led to the case of Toonen v Australia, in which the United Nations Human Rights Committee ruled that sodomy laws violated the International Covenant on Civil and Political Rights. Tasmania's continued refusal to repeal the offending law led the Keating government to pass the Human Rights (Sexual Conduct) Act 1994, which legalised sexual activity between consenting adults throughout Australia and prohibited laws that arbitrarily interfered with the sexual conduct of adults in private.

In the 1997 case of Croome v Tasmania, Rodney Croome applied to the High Court of Australia to strike down the Tasmanian anti-gay law as inconsistent with federal law; after having failed to have the matter thrown out, the Tasmanian Government decriminalised homosexuality with effect from 14 May 1997, becoming the final Australian jurisdiction to do so.

=== Table ===
State/Territory	Date male homosexual activity made legal (Date law came into effect)
Australian Capital Territory	8 November 1976
New South Wales	8 June 1984
Northern Territory	1 January 1984
Queensland	19 January 1991
South Australia	2 October 1975 (Note: Defence to charge of male homosexual activity if both parties in private and over 21 existed from 9 November 1972, but male homosexual activity offences remained until 1975 repeal.)
Tasmania	14 May 1997 (Note: Australia made all state laws interfering with adult, private sexual conduct illegal on 19 December 1994 with the commencement of the Human Rights (Sexual Conduct) Act 1994. Same sex activity was legal from that date under Section 109 of the Constitution of Australia, granting federal laws supremacy over state laws where there is an inconsistency. However, Tasmania still refused to make male homosexuality legal until a likely High Court loss prompted it to in 1997, the plaintiff, Rodney Croome, citing said Act.)
Victoria	1 March 1981 (Note: A "soliciting for immoral purposes" provision saw police harassment continue for some years.)
Western Australia	23 March 1990 (Note: "An offence against The Criminal Code section 181(1) or (3) as in force before 23 March 1990.")

=== Age of consent equalisation ===
The age of consent laws of all states and territories of Australia apply equally regardless of the gender and sexual orientation of participants. The age of consent in all states, territories and on the federal level is 16, except for Tasmania and South Australia where it is 17. The age of consent was equalised in 2002 by Western Australia and in 2003 by New South Wales and the Northern Territory. The last state to equalise its age of consent was Queensland in 2016, when it brought the age of consent for anal intercourse into line with vaginal intercourse and oral sex from 18 to 16 years of age.

=== Historical conviction expungement ===
All Australian jurisdictions have passed legislation that allows men charged or convicted under historical anti-homosexuality laws to apply for expungement, which clears the charge or conviction from their criminal record, and in South Australia, men can apply to have their convictions spent, but not expunged. After expungement, the conviction is treated as having never occurred, with the individual not required to disclose it and the conviction not showing up on a police records check. Without expungement laws, men who had been convicted of historical sodomy offences were at a disadvantage, including being subject to restrictions on travel and in applying for some jobs.

The dates when these laws took effect were as follows:

- South Australia – 22 December 2013; (Note: This is not a true expungement scheme because the conviction is instead treated as "spent" if an applicant commits no crimes for a set number of years (see here).)
- New South Wales – 24 November 2014;
- Victoria – 1 September 2015;
- Australian Capital Territory – 7 November 2015;
- Tasmania – 9 April 2018;
- Queensland – 30 June 2018;
- Western Australia – 15 October 2018;
- Northern Territory – 14 November 2018.

== Recognition of same-sex relationships ==
Australian law allows the recognition of same-sex relationships in a multitude of forms, depending on the couple's wishes. Same-sex couples can marry, enter into a civil union or domestic partnership in most states and territories, or can simply live together in an unregistered de facto relationship. Couples who enter into a civil union or domestic partnership are recognised as being in a de facto relationship for the purpose of federal law. According to the 2021 Census, there were around 78,000 same-sex couples living together in Australia.

=== Federal de facto relationship recognition ===
Following the Australian Human Rights Commission's report Same-Sex: Same Entitlements, and an audit of Commonwealth legislation, in 2009, the federal Rudd government introduced several reforms designed to equalise treatment for same-sex couples and their families. The reforms took the form of two pieces of amending legislation, the Same-Sex Relationships (Equal Treatment in Commonwealth Laws-General Law Reform) Act 2008 and the Same-Sex Relationships (Equal Treatment in Commonwealth Laws-Superannuation) Act 2008. These laws amended 85 other existing federal laws to equalise the treatment of same-sex couples, and any children raised by those couples, in a range of areas including taxation, superannuation, economic, health, social security, aged care and child support, immigration, citizenship and veterans' affairs.

For instance, in relation to social security and general family law, same-sex couples were not previously recognised as a couple for social security or family assistance purposes. A person who had a same-sex de facto partner was treated as a single person. The reforms ensured that, for the first time under Australian law, same-sex couples were recognised as a couple akin to opposite-sex partners. Consequently, a same-sex couple receives the same rate of social security and family assistance payments as a mixed-sex couple. Generally speaking, a couple in a de facto relationship is treated equally to a married couple in legal proceedings, with a few small differences in family law disputes, including property settlements and entitlements to spousal maintenance. A partner in a de facto relationship may also be required to prove the existence of a relationship before a court in order to access benefits, a process which is automatic for married couples and consequently had a discriminatory impact on same-sex couples before they were able to marry in Australia.

De facto relationships also have different time eligibility requirements than marriages under laws relating to Centrelink, migration, family law matters and assisted reproduction. The higher burden of proof for de facto relationships relative to marriages can impact on a person's ability to arrange their partner's funeral, and the rights of a de facto partner may be poorly understood by government departments.

From 1 July 2009, amendments to the Social Security Act 1991 meant that customers in a same-sex de facto relationship are recognised as partners for Centrelink and Family Assistance Office purposes. All customers who are assessed as being a member of a couple have their rate of payment calculated in the same way.

==== Inheritance and property rights ====
Before same-sex marriage provided the automatic legal protections that married couples received under the law with regard to inheriting assets from their partners, same-sex couples had to take specific legal actions. Individuals were not entitled to a partial pension after their same-sex partner's death. Same-sex and de facto couples who separated also did not have the same property rights as married couples under federal law and were required to use more expensive state courts, rather than the Family Court, to resolve disputes. The plan to grant equivalent rights to gays and de factos had been up for discussion since 2002, and all states eventually agreed, but the change was blocked because the Howard government insisted on excluding same-sex couples.

In June 2008, the Rudd government introduced the Family Law Amendment (De Facto Financial Matters and Other Measures) Act 2008 to allow same-sex and de facto couples access to the federal Family Court on property and maintenance matters, rather than the state Supreme Court. This reform was not part of the 100 equality measures promised by the Government but stemmed from the 2002 agreement between the states and territories that the previous Howard government did not fulfill. Coalition amendments to the bill failed and it was passed in November 2008.

=== Same-sex marriage ===
The Marriage Act 1961 defines marriage as "the union of 2 people to the exclusion of all others, voluntarily entered into for life". The Act was amended in 2004 by the Howard government to recognise only marriages between a man and a woman. Many subsequent attempts to legalise same-sex marriage nationwide failed in the Federal Parliament. The Turnbull government put legislation to the Parliament establishing a plebiscite on same-sex marriage, to be held in February 2017, though this was rejected by the Senate after it failed to attract the support of the opposition Labor Party and minor parties.

Several years beforehand, the Australian Capital Territory had passed laws instituting same-sex marriage in the territory. These laws were rejected by the High Court of Australia in December 2013, shortly after they came into effect. The Court held that Section 51 of the Constitution of Australia grants the Federal Parliament the power to legislate with regard to marriage, and the federal definition of marriage overrides any state or territory definition under Section 109. The court did find, however, that "marriage" for the purposes of Section 51 includes same-sex marriage, thus clarifying that there is no constitutional impediment to the Federal Parliament legislating for same-sex marriage in the future. Before the legalisation of same-sex marriage in December 2017, same-sex couples who married overseas were prevented from divorcing in Australia.

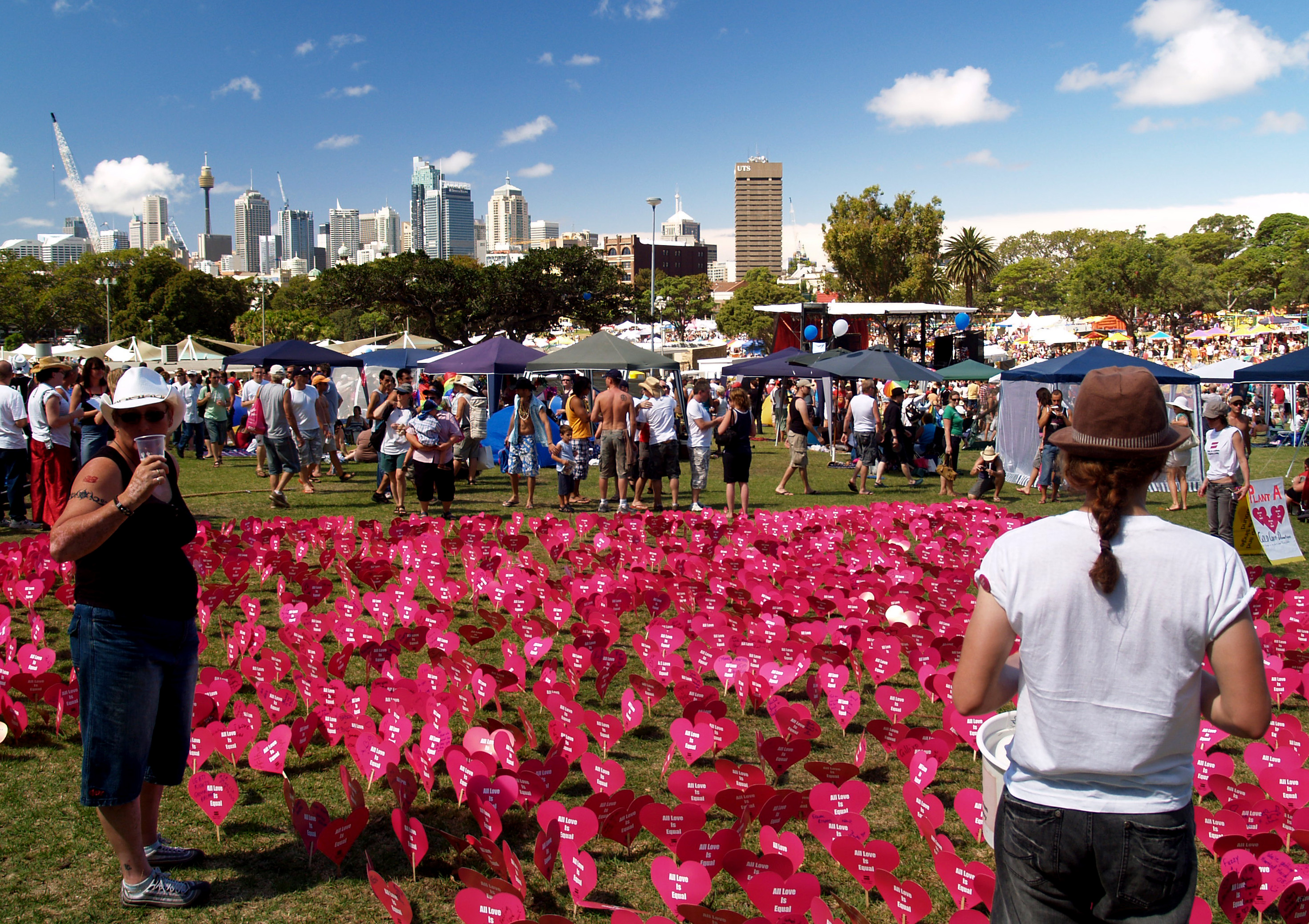
The "Sea of Hearts" at a same-sex marriage rally in 2007

After its plebiscite proposals were twice rejected by the Senate, the Turnbull government instead held a non-binding voluntary postal survey, asking Australians if same-sex couples should be allowed to marry. The survey, held between September and November 2017, did not require parliamentary approval. It returned a 61.6% "Yes" response in favour of same-sex marriage. A bill to legalise same-sex marriage was introduced into the Parliament shortly after the results were announced. The bill, titled the Marriage Amendment (Definition and Religious Freedoms) Act 2017, passed the Senate by 43 votes to 12 on 29 November 2017, and passed the House of Representatives on 7 December 2017. The bill received royal assent on 8 December 2017 and went into effect the following day. Same-sex marriages lawfully entered into overseas automatically became recognised and the first marriages under the amended law were to occur on 9 January 2018. However, several couples successfully applied for an exemption from the normal one-month waiting period, and the first legal same-sex wedding under Australian law was held on 15 December 2017, with further weddings occurring the following day.

=== State and territory recognition ===
Aside from Western Australia and the Northern Territory, all other states and territories in Australia have their own state-based civil union or domestic partnership laws. Cohabiting same-sex couples are otherwise recognised as de facto couples for the purposes of state or territory law.

Same-sex couples may enter into civil partnerships in the Australian Capital Territory and Queensland. Both unions allow couples to have state-sanctioned ceremonies and both laws are commonly referred to as civil unions. In New South Wales, Tasmania, Victoria and South Australia, same-sex couples can enter into domestic registered partnerships/relationships. These provide conclusive proof of the existence of the relationship, thereby gaining the same rights afforded to de facto couples under state and federal law without having to prove any further factual evidence of the relationship. In this way, a registered relationship is similar to a registered partnership or civil union in other parts of the world. Victoria and Tasmania's domestic partnership laws also allow any couple the option of having an official ceremony when registering their relationship. South Australia's law allowing registered relationships and recognised overseas and interstate same-sex unions went into effect on 1 August 2017. In Western Australia and the Northern Territory, same-sex couples must often seek judicial approval to prove a de facto relationship exists. Norfolk Island, from 1 July 2016, has been incorporated into NSW legislation, under both the Norfolk Island Legislation Amendment Act 2015 and the Territories Legislation Amendment Act 2016.

Prior to the federal legalisation of same-sex marriage, six Australian jurisdictions (Tasmania, Australian Capital Territory, New South Wales, Queensland, Victoria and South Australia), comprising 90% of Australia's population, recognised same-sex marriages and civil partnerships performed overseas, providing automatic recognition of such unions in their respective state registers.

State/Territory	Relationship recognition scheme	Register	Ceremony (optional)	Overseas same-sex marriages/unions recognised
ACT	Yes Civil partnerships (Note: Civil unions could be entered into by same-sex couples from 2012 until the federal legalisation of same-sex marriage in 2017, after which no new ones could be registered. See Same-sex marriage in the Australian Capital Territory for the full history of recognition of same-sex relationships in the Territory.)	Yes	Yes	Yes
New South Wales (Note: Including Norfolk Island, where NSW laws apply)	Yes Domestic partnerships	Yes	Yes	Yes
Northern Territory	No Unregistered cohabitation may be recognised as a de facto relationship	No	No	Yes (Federal law)
Queensland	Yes Civil partnerships	Yes	Yes	Yes
South Australia	Yes Registered relationships	Yes	Yes	Yes
Tasmania	Yes Domestic partnerships	Yes	Yes	Yes
Victoria	Yes Domestic partnerships	Yes	Yes	Yes
Western Australia (Note: Including the Australian Indian Ocean Territories of Christmas Island and Cocos (Keeling) Islands, where WA laws apply)	No Unregistered cohabitation may be recognised as a de facto relationship	No	No	Yes (Federal law)

== Adoption and parenting ==
Map of LGBT adoption rights in Australia as 2026

In April 2025, it was formally announced that Medicare rebates would now include single individuals and same-sex couples who undergo IVF treatments, but not surrogacy - for decades only heterosexual couples could access the Medicare rebates on IVF treatments. It also removed the outdated and archaic definitions of infertility.

States and territories make laws with respect to adoption and child-rearing. Since April 2018, same-sex couples can adopt children in all jurisdictions in Australia. The 2021 Australian census counted 13,554 (or 17.3%) children living in same-sex couple families, up from 6,915 in 2016 (or 14.8%). Altruistic surrogacy is legal in all Australian jurisdictions. Commercial surrogacy is banned nationwide. In recent years, a dramatic increase in the use of overseas surrogacy programs has occurred amongst both same-sex and opposite-sex couples, creating some unique legal concerns with respect to citizenship and parenting rights. It is believed that only 1 in 20 surrogacy arrangements occur in Australia, with almost all involving foreign surrogates mainly from Southeast Asia and the United States. Assisted reproductive technology/treatment (ART) is accessible to same-sex couples in all states and territories, with South Australia being the final jurisdiction to pass such a law, in March 2017. Female same-sex partners of mothers are usually considered the automatic co-parent of children born as a result of assisted reproduction.

State/Territory	Same-sex couple joint petition	Individual adoption (LGBT or non-LGBT)	Same-sex stepparent adoption	Altruistic surrogacy for same-sex couples
Australian Capital Territory	Yes (Since 2004)	Yes (Since 1993)	Yes (Since 2004)	Yes
New South Wales and Norfolk Island	Yes (Since 2010)	Yes (Since 2000)	Yes (Since 2010)	Yes
Northern Territory	Yes (Since 2018)	Yes (in exceptional circumstances) (Note: Northern Territory law states that a single person cannot be granted an adoption order unless "it is satisfied that, in the opinion if the Minister, exceptional circumstances exist that make it desirable to do so" (see here). Such a specific restriction does not exist in the laws of other states and territories, with the exception of South Australia.)	Yes (Since 2018)	Yes (Since 2022)
Queensland	Yes (Since 2016)	Yes (Since 2016)	Yes (Since 2016)	Yes (Since 2010)
South Australia	Yes (Since 2017)	Yes (in special circumstances) (Note: South Australian law states that a single person can only be granted an adoption order if "the Court is satisfied that there are special circumstances justifying the making of the order" (see here). Such a specific restriction does not exist in the laws of other states and territories, with the exception of the Northern Territory.)	Yes (Since 2017)	Yes
Tasmania	Yes (Since 2013)	Yes	Yes (Since 2004)	Yes
Victoria	Yes (Since 2016)	Yes	Yes (Since 2007)	Yes
Western Australia	Yes (Since 2002)	Yes	Yes (Since 2002)	Yes (Effective from mid-2027)

== Hate crime laws ==
In September 2024, a bill was introduced by the federal government that explicitly includes “sex, sexual orientation, gender identity and intersex status” to the federal hate crime laws - with a maximum penalty of 7 years’ imprisonment. Several jurisdictions of Australia have already implemented their own versions of hate crime laws decades ago - some cover only sexual orientation (NSW, ACT and VIC), or both sexual orientation and gender identity (SA, TAS and QLD), or also neither is covered (NT and WA). In February 2025, the federal hate crime bill passed both chambers with amendments with bipartisan support and officially became Act 1 of 2025 - by royal assent from the Governor-General. The law went into effect immediately. Legislation effective from June 30, 2026 Victoria has implemented the Anti-vilification Act 2025 - that explicitly covers all sex, sexual orientation, sex characteristics and gender identity provisions.

== Discrimination protections ==
=== Federal law protections ===
Prior to 1 August 2013, Australia did not comprehensively outlaw discrimination based on sexual orientation at the federal level. However, in response to Australia's agreement to implement the principle of non-discrimination in employment and occupation pursuant to the International Labour Organisation Convention No.111 (ILO 111), the Human Rights and Equal Opportunity Commission Act 1986 established the HREOC, and empowers it to investigate complaints of discrimination in employment and occupation on various grounds, including sexual orientation, and to resolve such complaints by conciliation. If it cannot be conciliated, the Commission prepares a report to the federal Attorney-General who then tables the report in Parliament. Employment discrimination on the ground of "sexual orientation" is also rendered unlawful in the Fair Work Act 2009, allowing complaints to be made to the Fair Work Ombudsman.

The Human Rights (Sexual Conduct) Act 1994 provided that sexual conduct involving only consenting adults (18 years or over) acting in private would not be subject to arbitrary interference by law enforcement. This applies to any law of the Commonwealth, State or Territory.

In late 2010, the Gillard Labor government announced a review of federal anti-discrimination laws, with the aim of introducing a single equality law that would also cover sexual orientation and gender identity. This approach was abandoned and instead on 25 June 2013, the Federal Parliament added marital or relationship status, sexual orientation, gender identity and intersex status as protected attributes to the existing Sex Discrimination Act 1984 by passing the Sex Discrimination Amendment (Sexual Orientation, Gender Identity and Intersex Status) Act 2013.

From 1 August 2013, discrimination against lesbian, gay, bisexual, transgender, and intersex people became illegal for the first time under national law. Aged care providers who are owned by religious groups will no longer be able to exclude people from aged care services based on their LGBTI or same-sex relationship status. However, religious owned private schools and religious owned hospitals are exempt from gender identity and sexual orientation provisions in the Sex Discrimination Amendment (Sexual Orientation, Gender Identity and Intersex Status) Act 2013. No religious exemptions exist on the basis of intersex status.

==== Religious exemptions ====
In introducing federal discrimination protections for LGBTI people, the Gillard government promised that religious bodies would be exempt, unless they were aged care providers receiving Commonwealth funding. The main exemptions are in sections 37 and 38 of the Sex Discrimination Act 1984, which include the ability for religious educational institutions to discriminate against LGBT students and teachers "in good faith in order to avoid injury to the religious susceptibilities of adherents of that religion". In 2017, Perth teacher Craig Campbell was dismissed from a Baptist school after he revealed his sexuality on social media. The Greens promised to repeal religious exemptions to LGBT anti-discrimination protections before the 2016 election, while in January 2018 the Labor Party announced it had no plans to act upon the issue. In the wake of the same-sex marriage debate, the Turnbull government commissioned a review of religious freedoms chaired by Phillip Ruddock, after conservative Coalition politicians called for increased religious freedoms to discriminate against LGBT people. A need to protect religious freedom was emphasised by Scott Morrison after he replaced Malcolm Turnbull as Prime Minister.

In October 2018, various portions of the Ruddock Review report were leaked, which included recommendations to clarify how religious schools could discriminate against LGBT teachers and students. This led to media backlash and polling showed that legal religious discrimination against gay students and teachers was opposed by most Australians, with majorities from every party's voters opposed. The Greens moved to repeal the religious school exemptions altogether, with Labor offering to work with the Coalition to repeal the student discrimination exemptions. After initially defending the status quo, Morrison stated the Coalition would remove the exemption allowing LGBT children to be discriminated against. Labor subsequently offered to repeal the exemptions allowing LGBT teachers' dismissal as well, which gained supported from Liberals Treasurer Josh Frydenberg and Wentworth by-election candidate Dave Sharma, but split the broader Liberal Party. Despite a promise to move rapidly on the issue, the Government and Opposition disagreed on the amendments to be made, blaming each other for the impasse. In 2019, the Morrison government referred the issue to the Australian Law Reform Commission. The Morrison government shifted its focus to introducing a Religious Discrimination Act, with its proposals criticised by Equality Australia and Ian Thorpe as providing a "licence to discriminate" against LGBT people and others in the name of religion, though the legislation failed to pass the parliament and the government was defeated at the 2022 election.

Following the Labor Party's victory at the 2022 election, the Albanese Government tasked the Australian Law Reform Commission with investiging the topic of religious exemptions in federal law. In January 2023 the commission released a consultation paper, recommending the law be amended to explicitly outlaw discrimination against both students and teachers on the grounds of sexual orientation, gender identity, marital status, and other traits. The commission also recommended allowing religious schools to maintain their religious character by being permitted to give preference to prospective staff on religious grounds where the teaching, observance, or practice of religion is a part of their role (and it is not discriminatory on other grounds); and require all staff to respect the educational institution's religious ethos.

=== State and territory law protections ===
Each of the states and territories introduced their own anti-discrimination laws to protect LGBTI people from discrimination before the Commonwealth did so in 2013. The first anti-discrimination protections were enacted in New South Wales by the Wran Government in 1982, two years before the decriminalisation of homosexuality in that state. All have religious exemptions, although discrimination by religious schools against LGBT students is not permitted in Queensland, the Northern Territory or Tasmania. South Australia requires a religious school discriminating against LGBT students to set out its position in a written policy. Tasmanian discrimination laws have the fewest exemptions, prohibiting discrimination by religious schools against both LGBT staff and students.

=== Gay panic defence abolition ===
Historically Australian courts applied the provocation doctrine to allow the use of the "homosexual advance defence", more commonly known as the "gay panic defence". This meant that for violent crimes such as murder, a male killer could argue that an unwanted homosexual advance from another man provoked him to lose control and respond violently, which could lead to his criminal responsibility being downgraded from murder to manslaughter and therefore a reduced penalty.

The first recorded use of the defence in Australia was the 1992 Victorian case of R v Murley, in which a man was acquitted of murder after killing a gay man who had allegedly made a sexual advance towards him. The defence was recognised nationwide by a majority of the High Court of Australia in the 1997 case of Green v the Queen. This led to calls for the defence to be abolished by legislation.

Several states and territories subsequently abolished the defence of provocation altogether, including Tasmania, New South Wales, Western Australia and Victoria. The Australian Capital Territory and the Northern Territory took a more targeted approach to reform, specifically abolishing the availability of non-violent homosexual advances as a defence. Queensland took a similar approach in 2017 by removing the "unwanted sexual advance" from the defence of provocation, while allowing courts to consider circumstances of an "exceptional character".

South Australia was the last state to retain the gay panic defence; however, following a review by the South Australian Law Reform Institute state Attorney General, Vickie Chapman, committed to its abolition. In December 2020, South Australia repealed the common-law gay panic defence – the last jurisdiction of Australia to do so.

=== School anti-bullying programs ===
One of the earliest recorded attempts to create organised activism and support on behalf of LGBT+ students came with the creation of the short-lived GAYTAS, attempted at a time when same-sex relationships were still illegal in New South Wales. Following decriminalisation in 1984 through the passing of Neville Wran's private member's bill, the onset of the AIDS epidemic abruptly reversed what had been a growing public acceptance of LGBT+ Australians in mainstream discourse. By the 1990s, in a wave of gay gang murders that killed as many as 88 gay men, homicides and gay-bashings were being committed at nearly three times the rate of police capacity or willingness to solve them, with some being committed by teenaged students. Both to prevent children from becoming involved with gangs perpetrating such assaults, and to protect their potential targets, the Gay and Lesbian Teachers and Students Association was formed to lobby the government for reform and to provide support for LGBT+ students and teachers. Active from 1991 to 1998, GaLTaS had direct dialogue with the Minister of Education, Virginia Chadwick, and relevant administrations, including the New South Wales Department of Education, the New South Wales Parents and Citizens Association, the New South Wales Police Force gay liaison service and the New South Wales Anti-discrimination Board. Prior to the launch at Randwick Boys High School by Chadwick of Jacqui Griffin's 'SchoolWatch Report', the NSW Department of School Education had already begun introducing measures such as the 'Mates' video, and the Books in Schools programme to support the Minister's School Anti-discrimination Grievance Procedures for Students, that provided a means for LGBT+ students to obtain legal redress and complete their education. GaLTaS also assisted students suing their schools, both state and private, for breach of duty of care and anti-gay vilification.

Initially established in Victorian schools in 2010, the Safe Schools Coalition Australia seeks to combat anti-LGBTI abuse or bullying, which research suggested has remained prevalent across Australian schools. Launched nationwide in 2014 under the Abbott government, the program has received support from a majority of state governments, LGBTI support groups and other religious and non-governmental organisations such as Beyond Blue, headspace and the Australian Secondary Principals Association.

However, the program faced criticism in 2015 and 2016 from social conservatives including the Australian Christian Lobby, LNP politicians such as Cory Bernardi, George Christensen, John Howard, Brendan Nelson, Scott Morrison, Eric Abetz, Malcolm Turnbull, Tony Abbott, Kevin Andrews and former Labor Senator Joe Bullock for indoctrinating children with "Marxist cultural relativism", and age-inappropriate sexuality and gender concepts in schools, while others criticised the Marxist political views of Roz Ward, a key figure in the program. Petitions were also delivered against the program by members of Australia's Chinese and Indian communities.

The concerns led to a review under the Turnbull government, which implemented a number of changes such as restricting the program to high schools, removing role playing activities and requiring parental consent before students take part. The federal changes were rejected by the governments of Victoria and the Australian Capital Territory, who persisted with the original program and announced they would fund it independently of the Federal Government. The federal changes were supported in New South Wales, Western Australia and Tasmania, while Queensland and South Australia have voiced criticism without announcing whether they would implement the federal changes. In December 2016, the Federal Government confirmed that it would not renew funding for the program after it expired in mid-2017. The program operates extensively in Victoria and is fully funded by the State Government. State governments are also fully responsible for directly funded programs in South Australia, and the Australian Capital Territory. Several schools in Western Australia, Queensland, Tasmania and the Northern Territory remain signed up to the national Safe Schools registry.

== Transgender rights ==
=== Gender recognition ===
Birth certificates and driver licences are within the jurisdiction of the states, whereas Medicare and passports are matters for the Commonwealth. The requirements for a person's change of sex to be recognised and amended in government records and official documents depend on the jurisdiction. Sex and gender recognition for purposes such as Medicare and passports require only a letter. The requirement to divorce before transitioning was removed following the legalisation of same-sex marriage in 2017. State and territory governments had until 9 December 2018 to remove the forced divorce requirement. Advocates argue that marital status and surgery requirements are irrelevant to the recognition of a person's sex or gender identity, and instead should rely on their self-identification.

The Australian Capital Territory and South Australia were the first two Australian jurisdictions to allow a person to change the sex recorded on their birth certificate without undergoing sex reassignment surgery or divorce if already married. The Northern Territory followed suit by removing both requirements in November 2018. Western Australia removed the forced divorce requirement in February 2019, having already allowed hormonal therapy as an alternative to sex reassignment surgery for a legal gender change since 2011. Victoria passed legislation removing only the forced divorce requirement in May 2018 and later in August 2019 removed the sex reassignment surgery requirement from law.

Queensland and New South Wales abolished the forced divorce provisions from the statute books in June 2018, though Queensland still requires an individual to have undergone surgery before being permitted to alter their sex descriptor on a certificate. In October 2020, the NSW Parliament lower house passed a "non-binding bipartisan motion" unanimously – calling for the human rights, dignity and respect for transgender individuals within NSW.

In Tasmania, a bill was introduced in the Parliament in October 2018 by the Hodgman Liberal government to repeal only the forced divorce requirement. However, amendments moved by the Labor opposition and the Greens were passed by the House of Assembly in November 2018 over government opposition, which: repealed the requirement for sex reassignment surgery, recognised non-binary genders, made the inclusion of gender optional on a birth certificate, lowered the age a person can change their legal gender without parental permission to 16, allowed parents of children of any age to apply for gender change consistent with the "will and preference" of the child, extended the time limit after birth for parents of intersex children to register their child's birth to 120 days and updated anti-discrimination law. The bill passed the Parliament in April 2019 and received royal assent the following month, with the majority of the bill commencing on the same day. The part that contains amendments to the Births, Deaths and Marriages Registration Act 1999 commenced on 5 September 2019.

==== Summary table of birth certificates by jurisdiction ====
Jurisdiction	Change of sex on birth certificates	Gender self-identification?	Sex reassignment surgery optional?	Forced divorce abolished?	Non-binary gender recognised?	Anti-discrimination laws concerning gender identity
Australian Capital Territory	Yes	Yes	Yes	Yes	Yes	Yes
New South Wales and Norfolk Island	Yes	Yes	Yes	Yes	Yes	Yes
Northern Territory	Yes	Unknown	Yes (appropriate clinical treatment)	Yes	Yes	Yes
Queensland	Yes	Unknown	Yes	Yes	Yes	Yes
South Australia	Yes	Unknown	Yes (appropriate clinical treatment)	Yes	Yes	Yes
Tasmania	Yes	Yes	Yes	Yes	Yes	Yes
Victoria	Yes	Yes	Yes	Yes	Yes	Yes
Western Australia	Yes	Unknown	Yes (appropriate clinical treatment)	Yes	Yes	Yes

Birth certificates are issued by states and territories. In many states, sterilisation is (or has been) required for transgender people to obtain recognition of their preferred gender in cardinal identification documents.

=== Gender dysphoria treatment ===
The Royal Australasian College of Physicians, the Royal Australian College of General Practitioners, the Australian Endocrine Society, and AusPATH all support access to puberty blockers for transgender youth.

Medical treatment for gender dysphoria in pubescent children is generally divided into two stages:

- Stage 1 treatment involves the use of puberty blockers, which are reversible and can be accessed by children who have reached stages 2 or 3 of pubertal development on the Tanner Scale – this may occur as early as 10 years old;
- Stage 2 treatment involves administering hormone replacement therapy such as testosterone or oestrogen. This has irreversible effects (such as a deepened voice following masculinizing hormone therapy or breast growth after feminizing hormone therapy). It is usually available once a person has reached 16 years of age.

Transgender Australians are generally not eligible for sex reassignment surgery until they turn 18 years old.

Medicare provides cover for many of the major surgeries needed for sex reassignment surgery. However, there can often be a gap between the Medicare benefit paid and the amount the surgeon will charge, sometimes in the amount of thousands of dollars. However, many Australian private health insurance policies provide private hospital cover policy that includes any SRS procedure that is also covered by Medicare. There is typically a waiting period before insurers allow people to claim for these services, usually about 12 months.

Since November 2017, a transgender child is able to access both puberty blockers and hormone treatment without court approval if there is agreement between the child, their parents and treating doctors. The first "Australian Standards of Care and Treatment Guidelines for trans and gender diverse children and adolescents" were released in 2018.

An independent review into gender-affirming care for minors commissioned by the New South Wales government and released in September 2024 found that puberty blockers are "safe, effective and reversible". However, they also called for more long-term research.

==== Queensland ban ====
In January 2025, shortly after assuming office, Queensland Health Minister Tim Nicholls under the right-wing Queensland Liberal Party announced an immediate pause on the prescription of puberty blockers (Stage 1 treatment) and cross-sex hormones (Stage 2 treatment) for new patients under 18 with gender dysphoria in Queensland's public health services, pending an independent review of evidence and best practices. The directive, issued by Queensland Health Director-General David Rosengren, exempted existing patients and allowed non-pharmacological support such as counselling, citing "contested evidence" on benefits and risks, including reports of treatments provided to children as young as 12 without adequate oversight. In November 2025, the opposition left-wing Queensland Labor Party passed a motion opposing the ban.

The policy, the first such ban in an Australian state, faced legal challenge from a parent of a transgender teenager, who argued it was procedurally flawed and politically motivated. On 27 October 2025, the Queensland Supreme Court ruled the directive unlawful, finding Rosengren had failed to conduct required consultations with Hospital and Health Service executives (limited to a 22-minute Microsoft Teams meeting concurrent with Nicholls's media announcement) under the Hospital and Health Boards Act 2011. Justice Peter Callaghan set aside the order, describing it as an improper exercise of power, though he did not rule on its substantive merits.

Hours later, on 28 October 2025, Nicholls exercised his ministerial discretion under section 44 of the Act to issue a new directive reinstating the restrictions in substantially the same terms, applying immediately to all public Hospital and Health Services. It mandates multidisciplinary panel approval for any exceptions and prioritises psychological interventions, pending the review's completion (expected November 2025) and a further evidence assessment by January 2026. Nicholls justified the action as necessary "in the public interest" to protect children amid ongoing debates over treatment efficacy. A legal challenge against the new directive was filed in December 2025.

The move has drawn criticism from medical bodies like the Australian Medical Association, left-wing political parties and LGBTQ+ advocates, who contend it undermines clinical autonomy, evidence-based care, and access for vulnerable youth, potentially exacerbating inequities by pushing families toward private services.

== Intersex rights ==
Although Australian terminology has expanded from "LGBT" to "LGBTI" to include intersex people, their experience remain poorly understood in the absence of substantial research in the area. Intersex status was previously considered a subset of gender identity, as reflected in the anti-discrimination law definitions of most states and territories of "gender identity" to include people with indeterminate sexual characteristics. Organisation Intersex International Australia considers this inaccurate on the basis that "intersex" people are defined by their biological sexual characteristics rather than their gender identities.

A key concern regarding intersex human rights is that intersex infants, who are unable to give consent, may be subjected to medical operations to reduce the prominence of non-binary sex characteristics of their genitalia. These procedures are criticised by intersex advocates who argue that they compromise the individual rights to bodily autonomy, integrity and dignity, drawing parallels to female genital mutilation, in contrast to the position that parents of intersex children may consent on their behalf to having medical interventions conducted in that they believe it to be in the best interests of their children.

In October 2013, the Australian Senate published a report entitled "Involuntary or coerced sterilisation of intersex people in Australia". The Senate found that "normalising" surgeries are taking place in Australia, often on infants and young children. The report made 15 recommendations, including ending cosmetic genital surgeries on infants and children and providing for legal oversight of individual cases. The recommendations have not been implemented.

Intersex individuals may apply for an Australian passport and other Commonwealth documentation with an "X" sex descriptor. Since 2011, the Australian Passport Office has issued such identity documents to all individuals with documented "indeterminate" sex. Their guidelines state that "sex reassignment surgery is not a prerequisite to issue a passport in a new gender. Birth or citizenship certificates do not need to be amended". Birth certificates are issued by states and territories. As of 2019, the Australian Capital Territory, New South Wales, the Northern Territory, South Australia and Tasmania have introduced "X" sex descriptors on birth certificates.

In March 2017, representatives of Androgen Insensitivity Syndrome Support Group Australia and Organisation Intersex International Australia participated in an Australian and Aotearoa/New Zealand consensus "Darlington Statement" by intersex community organisations and others. The statement calls for legal reform, including the criminalisation of deferrable intersex medical interventions on children, and improved access to peer support. It calls for an end to legal classification of sex and stating that legal third classifications, like binary classifications, were based on structural violence and failed to respect diversity and a "right to self-determination".

Summary
Physical integrity and bodily autonomy	Anti-discrimination protection	Access to identification documents	Access to same rights as other men and women	Changing M/F identification documents	Third gender or sex classifications
No	Yes (2013 for federal protection)	Yes (Commonwealth documents are available with an "X" sex option)	No (Exemptions regarding sport and female genital mutilation)	Yes (Policies vary depending on jurisdiction)	Yes (Opt in at the federal level, state/territory policies vary)

== Immigration policy ==
=== Sponsorship of same-sex partners ===
In 1985, changes were made to the Migration Act 1958 (Cth), after submissions from the Gay and Lesbian Immigration Task Force (GLITF), to create an interdependency visa for same-sex couples. The visa allows Australian citizens and permanent residents to sponsor their same-sex partners into Australia. Unlike married couples, immigration guidelines require de facto and interdependent partners to prove a twelve-month committed relationship, but it can be waived if the couple is registered by a state or territory's Registry of Births, Deaths and Marriages. The temporary and permanent visas (Subclasses 310 and 110) allow the applicant to live, work, study and receive Medicare benefits in Australia.

=== LGBT asylum policy ===
Australia is a party to the 1951 Refugee Convention, which obliges member states to offer protection to those seeking asylum due to a well-founded fear of persecution in their home countries due to, among other things, their membership of a particular social group. Australia first recognised "sexual preference" as a "social group" for the purposes of refugee protection in 1992 in Morato's Case. In 2003, a majority of the High Court of Australia held that Australia should not withhold asylum from gay refugees on the basis that they could protect themselves in their home countries by hiding their sexuality. The decision-making process for assessing LGBT asylum claims lacks consistency and relies on stereotypes such as whether the person attended gay clubs or joined lesbian groups.

In 2013, Prime Minister Kevin Rudd introduced a new asylum policy which meant that all asylum seekers arriving by boat would be sent offshore to Manus Island in Papua New Guinea for processing and resettlement. This included gay refugees, even though they face persecution under Papua New Guinean law with homosexual acts criminalised and a potential penalty of 14 years imprisonment. Asylum seekers are warned in an orientation presentation on arrival by the Salvation Army that "Homosexuality is illegal in Papua New Guinea. People have been imprisoned or killed for performing homosexual acts." This places them in the position of being required to declare their sexuality to be eligible for refugee protection yet liable to face persecution from other people and under local laws. Gay asylum seekers also face bullying, assault and sexual abuse on Manus Island from others, including officials and other refugees, due to their sexuality. Australia faces accusations from refugee advocates that it has violated its non-refoulement obligations under international law by exposing LGBT asylum seekers to such dangers. After the Supreme Court of Papua New Guinea in 2016 ordered the closure of Manus Island immigration detention centre on the basis that it breached constitutional guarantees of liberty, the Australian Government confirmed the closure but not what would happen to the detainees.

In practice, the protections for refugees seeking asylum on the basis of sexual orientation are limited, depending largely on invasive personal questions and the whim of the immigration officials involved. In 2014, then-immigration minister Scott Morrison introduced further changes which made it even more difficult for LGBTI refugees to prove the merits of their claim for asylum, such as narrowing the scope of protections and implementing a fast-track mechanism that may make it more difficult to gather necessary evidence to support an asylum claim. Australia's strict policy of mandatory detention and offshore processing for unauthorised boat arrivals has been criticised by non-government organisations including the ILGA, Human Rights Watch and Amnesty International, with particularly severe consequences for LGBT asylum seekers. The 2016 ILGA report on state-sponsored homophobia also describes the case of two gay Iranian asylum seekers resettled by Australia on Nauru who were "virtual prisoners" because they were "subjected to physical attacks and harassment by the local community, as they have been identified as being in a same-sex relationship", which was illegal at the time. In May 2016, Nauru decriminalised homosexuality by removing "carnal knowledge against the order of nature" as a criminal offence.

== Military service ==
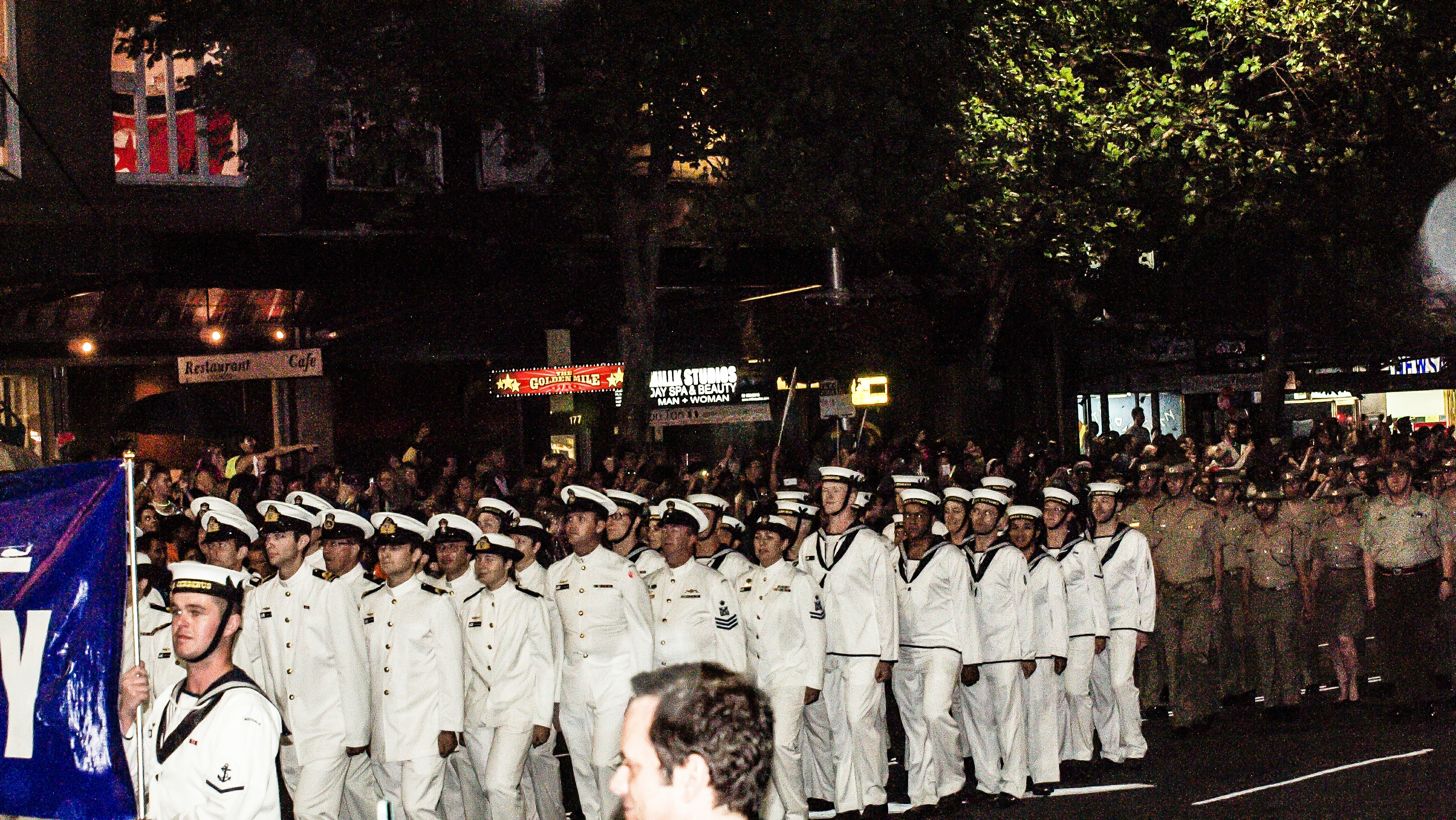
Australian Defence Force personnel marching in the 2013 Sydney Gay and Lesbian Mardi Gras

The Australian Defence Force (ADF) allows LGBT service members to serve openly and access the same entitlements as other personnel. LGBT personnel were effectively banned from the Australian armed forces until 1992; they could be subject to surveillance, interviews, secret searches and discharge from the military if discovered. The ban tended to be more strictly enforced during peacetime than wartime. Many homosexual personnel served in the military during the World Wars, the Korean War and the Vietnam War, with their comrades often being aware of their orientation and accepting of it.

In 1992, the Keating government overturned the ban on LGB personnel after a lesbian Australian Army reservist complained to the Human Rights and Equal Opportunities Commission that she was dismissed on the grounds of her sexuality. A 2000 study found that the lifting of the ban on gay service had not led to any identifiable negative effects on troop morale, combat effectiveness, recruitment and retention or other measures of military performance. The study also found that the lifting of the ban may have contributed to improvements in productivity and working environments for service members.

By the 2000s, the ADF was seeking to actively engage the gay and lesbian community. An official defence contingent joined the Sydney Gay and Lesbian Mardi Gras for the first time in 2008 and the contingent marched in uniform for the first time in 2013. Unofficial support groups had marched in the parade from 1996, initially against the wishes of the ADF's headquarters.

The ADF also recognises "interdependent relationships", which include same-sex relationships, regarding benefits available to active duty members. This means equal benefits in housing, moving stipends, education assistance and leave entitlements. To be recognised as interdependent, same-sex partners will have to show they have a "close personal relationship" that involves domestic and financial support. The ADF also gives equal access to superannuation and death benefits for same-sex partnerships.

Defence Force policy was amended to allow transgender Australians to openly serve in 2010. The policy was updated following the advocacy of Bridget Clinch, who sought to transition from male to female while serving in the Australian Army.

LGBTI personnel and their families are also supported and represented by the DEFGLIS, the Defence LGBTI Information Service Incorporated. Established in 2002, DEFGLIS has facilitated reforms in the ADF leading to improved recognition of same-sex partners, development of policy and guidance for members transitioning gender, and enhanced education about sexual orientation, gender identity and intersex people.

== Conversion therapy ==
Conversion therapy has a negative effect on the lives of LGBT people, and can lead to low self-esteem, depression and suicide ideation. The pseudoscientific practice has long been performed in Australia. In the 1950s in New South Wales, men convicted of same-sex sexual activity would often be segregated and "medicalised" within the prison system. The patients were subjected to apomorphine injections and electric shocks. At the time, conversion therapy was supported by public officials, who viewed homosexuality as a "curable disease". There is, however, no scientific or medical evidence to support the use of conversion therapy.

Nowadays, reports suggest that conversion therapy is more "secret" and "insidious", and is run by religious groups or medical health practitioners. State governments have come under increasing pressure to enact legislation to ban and crack down on the use of the pseudoscientific practice. On 9 February 2016, for instance, the Health Complaints Act 2016 was introduced to the lower house of the Victorian Parliament. The bill created a Health Complaints Commissioner with increased powers to take action against groups performing conversion therapy; these powers ranging from issuing public warnings to banning them from practicing in Victoria. The bill passed the lower house on 25 February 2016, passed the upper house on 14 April 2016 with minor amendments and passed the lower house with the attached amendments on 27 April 2016. Royal assent was granted on 5 May 2016. The law went into effect on 1 February 2017. In May 2018, the Victorian Government announced tougher regulations to crack down on people practicing conversion therapy. In May 2018, ACT Health Minister Meegan Fitzharris said "The ACT government will ban gay conversion therapy. It is abhorrent and completely inconsistent with the inclusive values of Canberrans."

A Fairfax Media investigation in 2018 reported that "across Australia, organisations who believe that LGBTI people can or should change are hard at work. Conversion practices are hidden in evangelical churches and ministries, taking the form of exorcisms, prayer groups or counselling disguised as pastoral care. They're also present in some religious schools or practised in the private offices of health professionals. They're pushed out through a thriving network of courses and mentors in the borderless world of cyberspace, cloaked in the terminology of 'self improvement' or 'spiritual healing.'" A study of Pentecostal-Charismatic churches found that LGBTI parishioners were faced with four options: remain closeted, come out but commit to remaining celibate, undergo conversion therapy, or leave the church ... the majority took the last option, though typically only after "agonising attempts to reconcile their faith and their sexuality". The study provides corroboration that conversion therapy remains practiced within religious communities.

Following the Fairfax investigation, Victorian premier Daniel Andrews called on the prime minister, Malcolm Turnbull, to support outlawing conversion therapy as part of the national mental health strategy. Federal health minister Greg Hunt declared that the issue is one for the states as no Commonwealth funding goes to sexual orientation change efforts—though "gay conversion ideology has been quietly pushed in schools as part of the federal government's chaplaincy program". The report noted that the Victorian law applies only to people offering health services and so does not catch religious groups and charities "who say they are helping same-sex attracted people to live in accordance with their faith".

Chris Csabs, a survivor of conversion therapy and LGBT+ advocate, joined Andrews in calling for the federal government to outlaw conversion therapy, declaring that "praying the gay away nearly killed me". He established a petition calling on Turnbull and Hunt to act to outlaw conversion therapy, declaring: "I prayed to God asking him to either heal me, or kill me. I was so depressed, I wanted to die." In April 2018, shadow health minister Catherine King wrote a response to the petition: "I'm writing to let you know that Labor stands with you, Chris Csabs and the medical experts in opposing gay conversion therapy ... two Turnbull Government ministers—the Acting Prime Minister and the Health Minister—have now failed to condemn the practice when given the chance." Shortly after Catherine King's response, the Queensland health minister, Steven Miles, voiced his concerns over the practise and stated that the federal health minister should be working with the states to enact change.

In April 2018, Health Minister Greg Hunt came under fire after he called conversion therapy "freedom of speech" and "a different view". After much criticism, he affirmed that the Federal Government does not support conversion therapy. In April 2018, the Victorian Liberal Party were set to debate a motion expressing support for conversion therapy at a party conference, but the motion was later removed from the agenda, following outrage from many Liberal politicians who called the motion an "embarrassment" and a "return to the 19th century".

In May 2018, the Victorian health minister, Jill Hennessy, called for an inquiry into gay conversion therapies. In an unprecedented move, the state government indicated it would not only investigate health professionals but will focus on religious and faith-based ministries propagating gay conversion ideologies. The following day, the health minister of the Australian Capital Territory, Meegan Fitzharris, followed Catherine King's lead by also responding to the petition, stating that, "The ACT government will ban gay conversion therapy. It is abhorrent and completely inconsistent with the inclusive values of Canberrans."

In September a 2018 SOCE (Sexual orientation Change Efforts) Survivor Statement, a document written by a coalition of survivors of conversion practices and calling on the Australian government to intervene to stop conversion practices occurring, was sent with the petition to key members of parliament. The authors of the SOCE Survivor Statement, which became known as the SOGICE (Sexual Orientation and Gender Identity Conversion Efforts) Survivor Statement in 2019, coined new terms such as "LGBTQA+ conversion practices", "conversion movement" and "conversion ideology" to more accurately reflect their experiences. The SOGICE Survivors Statement lists survivor-led recommendations to the Australian government to stop conversion practices in Australia.

=== Efforts to ban conversion therapy ===
In September 2018, the Australian Senate unanimously passed a motion expressing opposition to the pseudoscientific practice and calling on the state governments to enact laws prohibiting it.

At the 2019 federal election, the Australian Labor Party promised to introduce a national ban on conversion therapy if elected to government. In response, Coalition leader Scott Morrison said that while he opposed the practice, it was a matter for states and territories.

In August 2020, Queensland and the Australian Capital Territory became the first jurisdictions to pass legislation banning conversion therapy with 18 months imprisonment and 1 year imprisonment respectively.

On 11 November 2020, the Premier of Victoria, Daniel Andrews and the Australian Labor Party announced the Change or Suppression (Conversion) Practices Prohibition Bill denouncing conversion practices as cruel, harmful and deceptive. The introduced legislation would outlaw the 'therapy' with fines up to $10,000 (AUD) or up to 10 years jail time. Along with the introduction of this legislation the government will provide increased support for those who have already been forced to experience the harmful practices. The bill passed the Legislative Council on 4 February 2021 and received royal assent and came into force in February 2022. The Legislative Council vote was 27 in favour and 9 against.

On 22 March 2024, New South Wales parliament passed a bill banning conversion therapy. The Legislative Council vote was 22 in favour and 4 against. The bill took effect in April 2025. South Australia banned conversion therapy in September 2024 and the law took effect in April 2025.

Bans have been proposed by the governments of Tasmania, the Northern Territory, and Western Australia.

== Blood donation ==
Since April 20 2026, gay and bisexual men who are monogamous as a condition can donate blood within Australia without any deferral period. Since July 14, 2025 gay and bisexual men within Australia can donate plasma without any deferral period. Policies concerning blood and plasma donation have evolved over time for men who have had sex with men (MSM). A long-standing twelve-month sexual activity deferral period for male homosexual activity was instituted by Australian Red Cross Lifeblood (the nation's sole blood supply and donation organisation) in 2000. The policy was subject to a challenge in the Tasmanian Anti-Discrimination Tribunal in 2005, which was dismissed by the tribunal in 2009. The Victorian Government called on the federal government to remove the twelve-month MSM donation ban in 2016. In April 2020 the Therapeutic Goods Administration (TGA) announced it would revise the deferral period for MSM's down to three months. The revision required approval of the federal, state and territory governments before going into effect in February 2021.

In June 2025, Lifeblood removed most sexual activity wait times for plasma donations, with the changes going into effect from 14 July 2025. In addition, the TGA has approved a Lifeblood submission to remove gender-based sexual activity rules with respect to blood donation, meaning that all donors will be given the same questions about sexual activity, regardless of gender or sexuality, once the changes come into effect in mid-to-late 2026. Under these changes, people in a sexual relationship of six months or more with a single partner will be able to donate blood and people with new or multiple partners will be able to donate if they have not had anal sex in the past three months.

== Positions of religious faiths ==
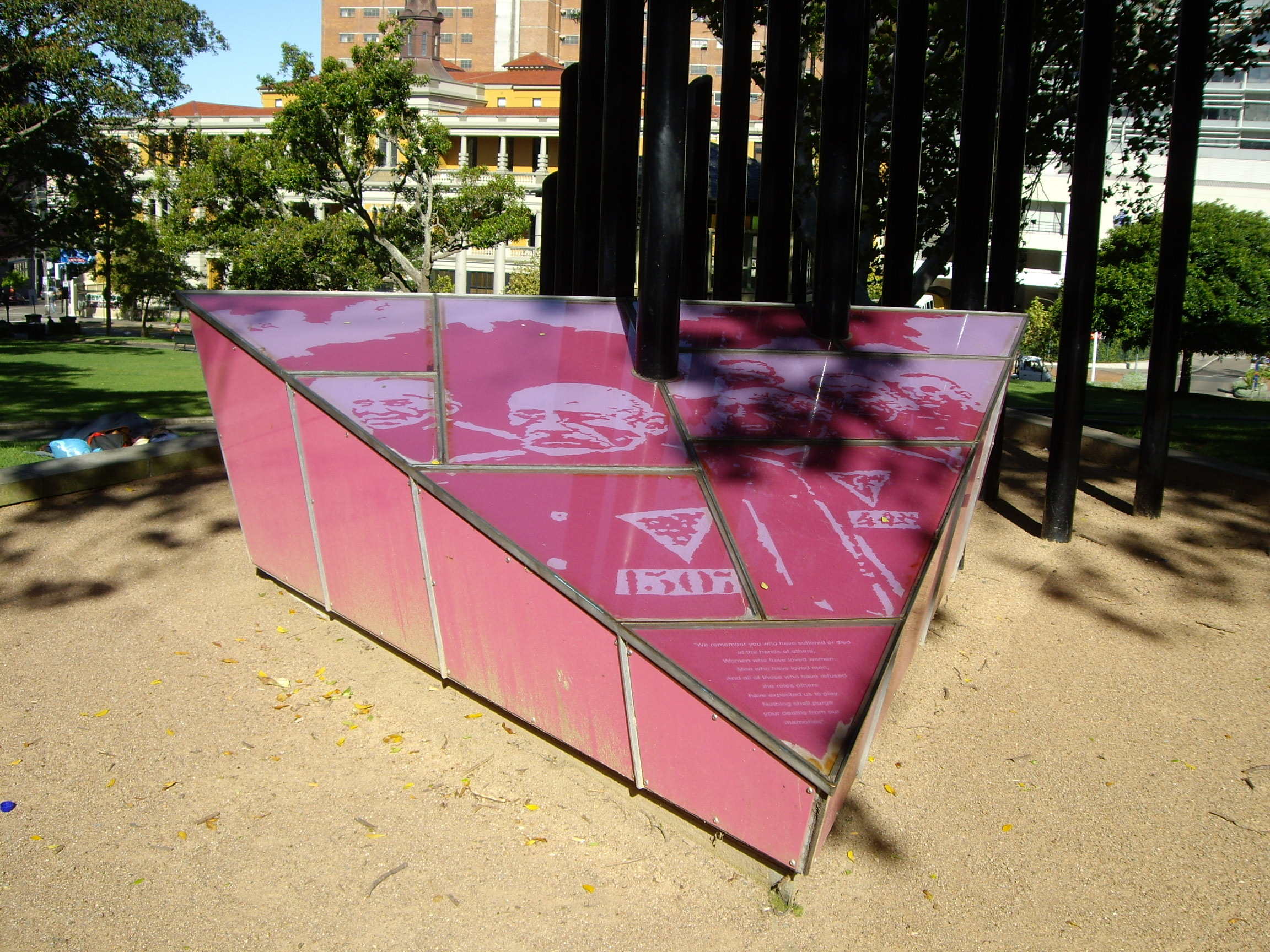
The Sydney Gay and Lesbian Holocaust Memorial, also known as the Pink Triangle, in Darlinghurst, Sydney

Australian faith communities vary widely in their official positions towards LGBT rights, including the legalisation of same-sex marriage. The official position of several major denominations of the Abrahamic faiths – Christianity, Judaism and Islam – is to oppose LGBT rights such as same-sex marriage, although this is not uniform across all denominations or clergy, with a number of religious leaders speaking out in favour of LGBT rights. The Australian Christian Lobby, formed in 1995, and the Catholic Australian Family Association, formed in 1980, strongly oppose LGBT access to adoption and marriage. The official positions of religious organisations are not necessarily shared by their adherents, with a 2005 study finding that along with members of the Anglican and Uniting churches, Australian Catholics were among the Australians most supportive of LGBTI people and their rights. Australia's peak Buddhist and Hindu organisations have expressed support for LGBT rights such as same-sex marriage.

With the advance of LGBT rights in Australia, religious opponents have increasingly used religious freedom arguments to justify continuing opposition against LGBT people on the grounds of their personal beliefs. Religious people in favour of LGBTI rights have also become more visible in the media, with the first interfaith pro-equality forum held in 2016.

In 2017, over 500 religious leaders in Australia wrote an open letter to the Australian Government to support marriage for same-sex couples, saying, "As people of faith, we understand that marriage is based on the values of love and commitment and we support civil marriage equality, not despite, but because of our faith and values."

=== Christianity ===
The leaders of several Christian denominations, such as Roman Catholicism and the Anglican Church, have opposed LGBT rights. In 2007, then-Catholic Archbishop of Sydney Cardinal George Pell, stated the Roman Catholic Church continues to teach that sexual activity should be confined to married opposite-sex couples and continues to oppose legitimising any extra-marital sexual activity and any "homosexual propaganda" among young people. Similarly, the former archbishop of the Evangelical Anglican Diocese of Sydney Peter Jensen vigorously opposed homosexuality, stating that accepting homosexuality is "calling holy what God called sin". Their successors, Anthony Fisher and Glenn Davies, continued to speak against LGBT rights, particularly in the context of opposing same-sex marriage. The Exclusive Brethren have also advertised against LGBT rights, such as in the lead up to the 2006 Tasmanian election. However, a number of moderate Anglican leaders have called for greater debate, noting that Australian Anglicans are divided with many supporting LGBT rights. Further, Catholic priest Father Paul Kelly advocated since 2008 for the abolition of the gay panic defence in Queensland to protect LGBT people from violence. As a direct result of his advocacy and online petition, the gay panic defence was abolished from Queensland law on 21 March 2017.

Since 2003, the Uniting Church in Australia has allowed sexually active gay and lesbian people to be ordained as ministers, with each individual presbyteries given discretion to decide the matter on a case-by-case basis. The Uniting Church has allowed ministers to conduct same-sex weddings at their discretion since 2018. Other LGBT-affirming Christian organisations include the Metropolitan Community Church, Acceptance for LGBT Roman Catholics and Freedom2b for Christians generally. On 13 July 2018, the Uniting Church in Australia voted to permit same-sex marriage and approve the creation of official marriage rites for same-sex couples.

A number of individual ministers of religion have publicised their support for LGBT rights and same-sex marriage without their denomination taking an official position. Father Frank Brennan has published an essay in Eureka Street arguing that while religious institutions should be legally exempt from "any requirement to change their historic position and practice that marriage is exclusively between a man and a woman", drawing a distinction between civil law and the Catholic sacrament of marriage, he added that recognition of civil unions or same-sex marriages in civil law may become necessary if the overwhelming majority of the population supported such a change. The Anglican Dean of Brisbane, Peter Catt, states that same-sex marriage is needed for "human flourishing and good order in society". Baptist minister Carolyn Francis asserted that churches needed to remain relevant and welcoming, including support for LGBTI rights and same-sex marriage.

=== Buddhism ===
Buddhist support for LGBT rights such as same-sex marriage was confirmed in 2012 by the Federation of Australian Buddhist Councils, which represents laypeople, and the Australian Sangha Association, which represents religious leaders. Bodhinyana Monastery abbot Ajahn Brahm also wrote to Parliament in support of same-sex marriage, noting that the institution of marriage pre-dates religion and that legalisation would alleviate human suffering.

=== Judaism ===
The Progressive Jewish community in Australia broadly supports LGBT rights, whereas the Orthodox branches remain opposed. Rabbi Shimon Cohen drew criticism for comparing homosexuality to incest and bestiality, and stating his support for gay conversion therapy. In 2007, the Council of Progressive Rabbis of Australia, New Zealand and Asia overturned their ban on same-sex commitment ceremonies. The North Shore Temple Emmanuel in Sydney began offering same-sex commitment ceremonies from 2008. In 2011, the Rabbinic Council of Progressive Rabbis of Australia, Asia and New Zealand announced their support for same-sex marriage under Australian law. This news was broadly publicised via a media release issued by Australian Marriage Equality on 25 May 2011. In May 2018, five months after the legalisation of same-sex marriage, Ilan Buchman and Oscar Shub became the first Jewish same-sex couple to marry in an Australian synagogue, the North Shore Temple Emmanuel in Sydney, after being in a relationship for 47 years.

=== Islam ===
The Australian Federation of Islamic Councils, a peak umbrella body for Muslim organisations, strongly opposed removing discrimination against same-sex couples in federal law. Chairman Ikebal Patel said such moves would threaten the "holy relationship" of marriage and the core values of supporting families. The Sunni Grand Mufti of Australia since 2011, Ibrahim Abu Mohamed, has maintained that Islam opposes what he has termed "sexual perversions" as a "religious fact". One imam sitting on the Sunni Australian National Imams Council described homosexuality as an "evil act" that spread diseases, while another stated that death is the Islamic penalty for homosexuality.

Nur Warsame is a gay imam in Melbourne who seeks to help LGBT Muslims reconcile their faith with their sexuality. In 2018, Warsame announced his intention to open an LGBTI-friendly mosque in Melbourne.

An Australian branch of the LGBT-friendly Muslims for Progressive Values was established in Australia by Professor Saher Amer from the University of Sydney and Reem Sweid from Deakin University who claim Australia is home "to some of the most conservative Muslims in the western world". Other Australian Muslims including Osamah Sami, and Muslims Against Homophobia Australia founder Alice Aslan have noted the need to address deep-seated homophobia in Australian Muslim communities.

=== Hinduism ===
Having previously been opposed, in 2015, the Hindu Council of Australia declared it would support same-sex marriage in future after a wide-ranging consultation process on the basis that it desired to support freedom and that the issue is not considered at all in Hindu scriptures.

In 2017, a spokesman for the Australian Council of Hindu Clergy announced its support for same-sex marriage. The Australian Council of Hindu Clergy later issued a clarifying statement stating that it considered marriage to be between a man and a woman, after a formal vote indicated 90% opposition of its members to same-sex marriage.

== Politics ==
Australian political parties are polarised on LGBT rights issues, with stronger support from left-of-centre parties such as the Australian Greens and the Australian Labor Party, as well as among moderate members of the centre-right Liberal Party. At state and territory level, most LGBTI law reform has been undertaken by Australian Labor Party governments. The number of openly LGBTI politicians has been increasing since the election of the first openly gay federal politician, former Greens leader Bob Brown, in 1996.

=== Coalition ===
The liberal-conservative Coalition has mixed views on LGBT rights, but its senior partner the Liberal Party of Australia has fielded an increasing number of LGBTI candidates in federal elections, including the first openly gay man elected to the House of Representatives, Trent Zimmerman. After the 2016 Australian federal election, he was joined by fellow gay Liberals Tim Wilson and Trevor Evans, with gay Senator Dean Smith representing Western Australia for the Liberals in the Senate since 2012. Each differs in their level of activism on LGBT issues, considering themselves members of the Liberal Party first and foremost.

The Coalition's history on LGBT issues is mixed. Originally, the topic sexuality was viewed by the Liberal Party as a private 'moral' issue "rather than one bound by party disciplin". During the 1970s, moderate Liberal politicians such as John Gorton and Murray Hill worked across party lines in supporting the decriminalisation of homosexuality.

From 1996, under the leadership of John Howard, LGBT rights became part of the culture wars over social policy and were used as wedge politics to separate social conservatives from the Australian Labor Party. Carol Johnson asserts that "Howard partly drew on Margaret Thatcher’s socially conservative strategy of mobilising heteronormativity and homophobia to attract voters, especially former Labour ones". Describing himself as "somewhere in the middle" on the acceptance of homosexuality, Howard refused to support the Sydney Gay and Lesbian Mardi Gras and stated he would be "disappointed" if one of his sons were gay. He also stated that "homosexual liaisons" did not deserve recognition as marriages and opposed LGBT adoption. Howard was also accused by a former ComCar driver of plotting with fellow politician Bill Heffernan to force the resignation of openly gay High Court judge Michael Kirby by having Heffernan make baseless allegations of misconduct against Kirby in Parliament. Howard refused to apologise to Kirby and continued to support Heffernan after the alleged evidence was proven fake. In 2004, the Howard government introduced laws allowing same-sex partners to inherit their partner's superannuation. Later that year, the Government passed laws to prevent same-sex marriages being performed or recognised in Australia. In 2007, Howard stated that HIV-positive immigrants should be banned from entering the country.

Following the loss of government in the 2007 Australian federal election, new leader Brendan Nelson flagged the Coalition's support for removing legal discrimination against same-sex couples in all areas except marriage, adoption and fertility services. Tony Abbott became the Opposition Leader in 2009. Abbott who maintained a socially conservative approach to LGBT issues and stated he felt a "bit threatened" by homosexuality but supported "enduring" gay unions. In 2015, Abbott addressed the tension between moderate and conservative members over a potential conscience vote on same-sex marriage with a joint Coalition party room meeting, which resolved that the matter required a vote by the Australian public first and prevented its members exercising a conscience vote on the issue. Abbott was accused by Christopher Pyne of "branch stacking" the party room by calling a joint meeting with the largely socially conservative Nationals, as this reduced the prospects of a free vote being endorsed.

Abbott was replaced in a leadership spill in September 2015 by same-sex marriage supporter Malcolm Turnbull, who had to maintain the plebiscite requirement as part of his elevation to the leadership. Under the Turnbull government, conservative members used the Safe Schools program and same-sex marriage as proxy issues to oppose the party's progressive wing after moderate Malcolm Turnbull's successful leadership challenge to Tony Abbott. Conservatives prevailed over progressives in the party by denying a conscience vote in the Parliament on same-sex marriage and successfully advocating for changes and the removal of federal funding to the Safe Schools anti-bullying program.

Aside from Darren Chester and Nigel Scullion, the Liberals' junior coalition partner, the National Party of Australia, is more uniformly opposed to same-sex marriage.

The subsequent government of Scott Morrison was relatively hostile to LGBT rights. Morrison, an adherent of Pentecostal Christianity, opposed LGBT rights and attempted to steer the Liberal Party in a more socially conservative direction compared to Turnbull. Morrison mobilised anti-transgender rhetoric, frequently criticising "gender ideology", gender and sex education, to appeal to socially conservative voters. Anti-LGBTQ initiatives by the Morrison government included proposing "religious discrimination" laws to legalise certain forms of discrimination against LGBT people, refusing to protect LGBT teachers and students from discrimination by religious schools, banning Australian Defence Force morning teas supporting LGBT rights and Morrison endorsing the opposition to trans participation in women's sport, as expressed by Senator Claire Chandler and 2022 election candidate Katherine Deves.

Under Peter Dutton, the Liberal Party maintained a relatively more moderate stance on LGBT issues compared to the Morrison government. Johnson notes that unlike with Morrison, transgender issues were not a central part of Dutton's policy platform to avoid alienating socially-liberal urban voters; yet trans issues "clearly remained as part of his anti-woke agenda". For example, Dutton emphasised opposition to trans women in women's sports, while maintaining support for the right of transgender people to change their sex on their passport. In the 2025 federal election Liberals under Dutton allocated preferences to anti-trans political parties such as One Nation, Family First, and the Trumpet of Patriots.

The Liberal Party of Australia now supports recognition of LGBT people and a ban on conversion therapy.

=== Australian Labor Party ===
The Australian Labor Party's position has increasingly shifted in favour of pro-LGBTI policies, in part to counter the electoral rise of the Australian Greens, and in part through internal lobbying by LGBT supporters such as Penny Wong, Anthony Albanese and Tanya Plibersek. Under the leadership of Mark Latham in 2004, Labor supported the Howard government's ban on same-sex marriage to appease its right-wing factions and avoid losing electorates in western Sydney. The party platform continued to oppose same-sex marriage and civil unions until the 2011 National Conference, which passed motions supporting same-sex marriage while allowing its politicians a conscience vote. By 2013, the Labor Right faction also supported same-sex marriage. Opponents of LGBT rights in the party gradually departed, with Senator Joe Bullock leaving in 2016 after party policy changed in 2015 to bind members in favour of same-sex marriage from 2019 onwards. At the 2019 election, the party announced a range of LGBTI policies including a national conversion therapy ban, removing exemptions that allow for discrimination by religious schools against LGBT staff and students, a dedicated LGBTI human rights commissioner, increased HIV funding and increasing legal protections for transgender and intersex people.

=== Australian Greens ===
The Australian Greens are strongly supportive of LGBTI rights, with their first federal leader Bob Brown being the first openly gay politician elected to the Federal Parliament. The party has found significant electoral support among LGBTI Australians. They have consistently supported same-sex marriage and are in favour of adoption rights for same-sex couples. The Greens were also the first party to call for the legalisation of same-sex marriage and Greens MPs often use the slogan, "every vote, every time" in support. The Greens support calls to ban conversion therapy due to the harmful mental health impacts of sexual orientation and gender identity change efforts.

In education, the Greens have expressed strong support for the Safe Schools program and believe that staff and students should not face discrimination in the education system. The party supports increased access to hormone treatments for transgender and gender diverse people, and support the processing of refugees in Australia who have been criminally charged with homosexual acts in their home countries. The party has supported the removal of the gay blood ban and the gay panic defence.

The Greens would like to establish a federal Office for LGBTI People, as part of the Department of the Prime Minister and Cabinet, and believe Australia should have a dedicated Commissioner for Sexual Orientation, Gender Identity and Intersex Rights at the Australian Human Rights Commission with powers equivalent to existing commissioners.

=== Pauline Hanson's One Nation ===
Whilst Pauline Hanson's One Nation party does not have any specific published policies regarding LGBT people, Senator Pauline Hanson voted 'no' in the same-sex marriage plebiscite and against the same-sex marriage bill in parliament. Pauline Hanson has voted consistently in federal parliament against increasing legal protections for LGBTI people. Pauline Hanson has also spoken out against same-sex adoption.

James Ashby who is the General Secretary of One Nation and chief of staff for Pauline Hanson since 2017, is gay.

During the 2017 Queensland state election, One Nation disendorsed its Bundamba candidate Shan Ju Lin after her anti-gay social media post. Lin accused James Ashby of deciding on Hanson's behalf that Lin should be disendorsed. In December 2016, Andy Semple withdrew as a candidate for Currumbin, after the party told him to delete an LGBT joke on Twitter.

In 2023, Hanson criticised NSW One Nation leader Mark Latham tweet in response to fellow politician Alex Greenwich, who is openly gay and called for him to apologise.

== Summary table ==
=== Federal jurisdiction ===
Jurisdiction	Same-sex marriage and de facto relationship recognition implemented	Federal hate crime legislation implemented (explicitly including sex, sexual orientation, gender identity and intersex status)	Anti-discrimination legislation	LGBT military personnel can serve openly	Right to change legal gender without sex reassignment surgery	Gender self-identification	Legal recognition of non-binary gender
Australia	Yes (2017; 2009)	Yes (Since 2025, under the Criminal Code Act 1995)	Yes (Since 1984, under the Sex Discrimination Act 1984)	Yes (Since 1992 for LGB people; since 2010 for trans people)	Yes (Since 2013 under the Australian Government Guidelines on the Recognition of Sex and Gender; otherwise covered by state/territory law)	No	Yes (Since November 2018)

=== State/Territory jurisdiction ===
Jurisdiction	Expungement scheme implemented	Gay panic defence abolished	Conversion therapy banned	Hate crime laws that includes sexual orientation and gender identity	Anti-vilification law	Right to change legal gender	Gender self-identification
Australian Capital Territory	Yes (2015)	Yes (2004)	Yes	Yes	Yes	Yes	Yes
Christmas Island	Yes (2015, under Canberra administration)	Yes (2004, under Canberra administration)	No (No law prohibits it)	Yes	Yes	Yes	No
Cocos (Keeling) Islands	Yes (2015, under Canberra administration)	Yes (2004, under Canberra administration)	No (In 2016, 75% of the Cocos-Keeling Islands nominated Islam as their religion and the local mosque can still legally convert homosexuals)	Yes	Yes	Yes	No
New South Wales	Yes (2014)	Yes (2014)	Yes	Yes	Yes	Yes	Yes
Norfolk Island	Yes	Yes	Yes (Conversion therapy has never existed on the island)	Yes	Yes	Yes	No
Northern Territory	Yes (2018)	Yes (2006)	No (Proposed)	No	No	Yes	No
Queensland	Yes (2018)	Yes (2017)	Yes	Yes	Yes	Yes	No
South Australia	/ (2013; can apply to have recorded as spent conviction, not expunged)	(2020)	Yes	Yes	No	Yes	No
Tasmania	Yes (2018)	Yes (2003)	No (Proposed)	Yes	Yes	Yes	Yes (2019)
(Victoria (state)) Victoria	Yes (2015)	Yes (2005)	Yes	Yes	Yes	Yes	Yes (2019)
Western Australia	Yes (2018)	Yes (2008)	No (Proposed)	No	No	Yes	No

== See also ==
- LGBTQ people in Australia
- Human rights in Australia
- LGBTQ rights in Oceania
- Same-sex marriage in Australia
- Category:Australian LGBTQ rights activists
- Category:Intersex rights activists
- LGBTQ history in Australia

LGBTQ rights in Australian states and territories:

- LGBTQ rights in the Australian Capital Territory
- LGBTQ rights in New South Wales
- LGBTQ rights in the Northern Territory
- LGBTQ rights in Queensland
- LGBTQ rights in South Australia
- LGBTQ rights in Tasmania
- LGBTQ rights in Victoria
- LGBTQ rights in Western Australia
