= LGBTQ adoption and parenting in Australia =

Map of LGBT adoption rights in Australia as 2026

Law in Australia with regard to children is often based on what is considered to be in the best interest of the child. The traditional and often used assumption is that children need both a mother and a father, which plays an important role in divorce and custodial proceedings, and has carried over into adoption and fertility procedures. As of April 2018 all Australian states and territories allow adoption by same-sex couples. In April 2025, it was formally announced that Medicare rebates would now include single individuals and same-sex couples who undergo IVF treatments, but not surrogacy - for decades only heterosexual couples could access the Medicare rebates on IVF treatments. It also removed the outdated and archaic definitions of infertility.

== Overview ==
	Same-sex couple joint petition	LGBTQ individual adoption	Same-sex stepparent adoption
New South Wales and Norfolk Island	No Yes (since 2010)	Yes (since 2000)	No Yes (since 2010)
ACT	Yes (since 2004)	Yes (since 1993)	Yes (since 2004)
Western Australia	Yes (since 2002)	Yes	Yes (since 2002)
Tasmania	Yes (since 2013)	Yes	Yes (since 2004)
Victoria	Yes (since 2016)	Yes	Yes (since 2007)
Queensland	Yes (since 2016)	Yes (since 2016)	Yes (since 2016)
South Australia	Yes (since 2017)	Yes (since 2017) (Note: The laws regarding single persons (LGBT and non-LGBT) and adoption are more restrictive than other states. In South Australia, single people can have an adoption order granted where "the Court is satisfied that there are special circumstances justifying the making of the order". See LGBT rights in South Australia#Same-sex adoption for more.)	Yes (since 2017)
Northern Territory	Yes (since 2018)	Only in exceptional circumstances	Yes (since 2018)

== Legislative progress ==
Since April 2018, adoption by same-sex couples is legally available in all jurisdictions of Australia.

South Australia, introduced a bill to the South Australian Parliament that allows same-sex couples to adopt children in September 2016 and which passed the Parliament in December 2016. That bill received Royal Assent a week later and took effect in February 2017.

In Queensland, same-sex couples have been legally allowed to adopt since passage of a law in November 2016. Single LGBT people may adopt in some states, but individuals seeking to adopt are considered less of a priority than couples and lengthy waiting lists for adoption make it virtually impossible. Individuals may usually only adopt a child with special needs or in cases of exceptional circumstances.

Western Australia became the first Australian state to allow same-sex adoptions when its Labor government passed the Acts Amendment (Lesbian and Gay Law Reform) Act 2002 which in turn amended the Adoption Act 1994 (WA). This allowed same-sex couples to adopt in accordance with criteria that assesses the suitability of couples and individuals to be parents, regardless of sexual orientation.

Australia's first legal gay adoption, by two men, occurred in Western Australia in June 2007. Subsequently, on 2 August 2007, the federal government under Prime Minister John Howard announced it would legislate to stop same-sex couples adopting a child from overseas, and would further not recognise adopted children of same-sex couples. The federal Coalition's proposed Family Law (Same Sex Adoption) Bill would amend the Family Law Act 1975 and override state and territory laws that currently cover international adoptions. The bill was due to be introduced in the spring 2007 session of parliament, but has been taken off the agenda following the 2007 federal election.

In July 2009 the NSW Law and Justice Committee decided that the Adoption Act 2000 should be amended to allow same-sex couples the right to adopt. Committee chair Christine Robertson said, "The committee has concluded that reform to allow same-sex couples to adopt will help to ensure that the best interests of children are met by our adoption laws and all recommendations were implemented in 2010."

== Same-sex step-parent adoption ==
Where joint adoption of children by same-sex couples is legal, so too is step-parent adoption. In all jurisdictions within Australia, a lesbian co-mother or gay co-father may use stepparent adoption provisions, although female couples in those states whose children were born through assisted conception may not actually need to adopt them, as the law there presumes the mother's female partner to be a legal parent as long as she consented to the conception. As of 2017, all states and territories, allow both same-sex partners to have a legally recognised relationship with their child - except Western Australia within surrogacy.

However, even those laws contain a general presumption against making an adoption order because an adoption order severs the legal relationship between the child and one of the child's birth parents. Due to the serious consequences of an adoption order, all step-parent adoption laws (including those applying to opposite-sex couples) contain a strong preference for dealing with new parenting arrangements through a parenting order rather than an adoption order.

Alternately, the lesbian co-mother or gay co-father of a child may apply to the Family Court of Australia for a parenting order, as 'other people significant to the care, welfare and development' of the child. It provides an important "status quo" if the birth mother were to die, preventing other family members from taking immediate custody of the child.

The Human Rights and Equal Opportunity Commission (HREOC) issued a report in 2007 entitled National Inquiry into Discrimination against People in Same-Sex Relationships recommended amending or creating laws recognising the relationship between a child and both same-sex parents. In particular, "'Stepparent adoption' laws should more readily consider adoption by a lesbian co-mother or gay co-father. This will require amendments to remove the prohibition on same-sex stepparent adoption in all state and territory laws other than in WA, the ACT and Tasmania." The final report of the Same-Sex: Same Entitlements Inquiry was tabled in Parliament on 21 June 2007.

== Assisted reproduction and surrogacy ==
Assisted Reproductive Technology (ART) and surrogacy comes under the jurisdiction of states and territories in Australia so national legislation cannot be used to no its practice. ART services (which include but are not limited to In Vitro Fertilization and artificial insemination) and other reproductive technologies are legal in all states and territories (see LGBT rights in Australia for more). Western Australia is the only state that bans altruistic surrogacy for singles and same-sex couples.

Commercial surrogacy and related advertising remains illegal in all of Australia, regardless. Altruistic surrogacy, where the surrogate receives no financial reward for her pregnancy or the relinquishment of the child, is legal in all of Australia, though in Western Australia it is reserved for opposite-sex couples only. South Australia and the Northern Territory recently legally allowed same-sex couples the right to altruistic surrogacy arrangements by legislation (see LGBT rights in South Australia for more). With altruistic surrogacy, only expenses related to the pregnancy and birth are paid by the intended parents such as medical expenses, maternity clothing, and other related expenses.

The practice of altruistic surrogacy for same-sex couples and single people remains illegal only in Western Australia. It is believed that only 1 in 20 surrogacy arrangements take place in Australia; almost all involving foreign surrogates from South-East Asia and the United States. In Tasmania, until 30 April 2012 then the Surrogacy Contracts Act 1993 is then repealed and replaced on 1 May 2013 with the Surrogacy Act 2012 becoming effective to allow altruistic surrogacy for all singles and couples of all genders. In Queensland where the newly elected state Liberal National Party government who won the Queensland state election in March 2012 with a massive super-majority, has announced that they will re-criminalise altruistic surrogacy for singles, same-sex couples and opposite-sex couples who have been in a de facto relationship for less than 2 years. In November 2006, Attorneys-General from all states and territories agreed in principle to uniform surrogacy regulations which meant couples would no longer have to travel to avoid illegal arrangements in their home state after Victorian Senator Stephen Conroy and his wife, Paula Benson, revealed that their daughter Isabella had been born to a surrogate mother in Sydney via the in-vitro fertilisation of a donated egg. In April 2007, Federal Attorney-General Philip Ruddock called for national surrogacy laws, so couples in some states no longer have to travel elsewhere to undergo the procedure legally.

Obtaining legal parental rights for same sex partners of birth parents has only recently been addressed in limited ways. All states and territories recognise female co-mothers as birth parents of children conceived through in vitro fertilisation or artificial insemination. Male couples who arrange altruistic surrogacy (since commercial surrogacy is illegal) using one partner's sperm, which may be legally possible in the Australian Capital Territory, New South Wales, Tasmania, Queensland, Victoria and South Australia, will face legal difficulties gaining rights for the genetic father as a 'sperm donor', and terminating the surrogate mother's rights (ideally through a stepparent adoption), which will be required in order to obtain legal recognition for the non-biological male partner. A growing number of male couples from around the world are attempting to become parents through surrogacy in America due to its favourable laws. However, it is a criminal offence for a person ordinarily resident in Queensland, New South Wales or the ACT to enter into a commercial surrogacy arrangement anywhere in the world.

	ART/IVF for surrogates of male couples	ART/IVF for lesbian couples	Commercial surrogacy	Altruistic surrogacy	Automatically recognise non-genetic parent at birth
Queensland	Yes	Yes Legal	No Illegal	Yes Legal	Yes (for all couples)
ACT	Yes	Yes Legal	No Illegal	Yes Legal	Yes (for all couples)
Tasmania	Yes	Yes Legal	No Illegal	Yes Legal	Yes (for all couples)
Victoria	Yes	Yes Legal	No Illegal	Yes Legal	Yes (for all couples)
New South Wales and Norfolk Island	Yes	Yes Legal	No Illegal	Yes Legal	Yes (for all couples)
South Australia	Yes	Yes Legal	No Illegal	Yes Legal	Yes (for all couples)
Northern Territory	Yes	Yes Legal	No Illegal	Yes Legal	Yes (for all couples)
Western Australia	No Illegal	Yes Legal	No Illegal	No Illegal (banned for singles and same sex couples; bill pending to remove ban); Yes Legal (for heterosexual couples who are married or in a de facto relationship)	Yes (for all couples), No (male couples)

=== ACT ===
The Parentage Act 2004 made non-commercial surrogacy legal but the birth mother and her husband were deemed to be the parents unless the genetic parents adopt the child back. In 2000, The ACT became the first state or territory to allow the genetic parents who are heterosexual of a child born through surrogacy to become its legal parents, allowing them to easily obtain a parenting order and avoid adoption. It is illegal to advertise for a surrogate and to pay for a surrogate or an ovum donor. When two women are in a same-sex relationship, and one of them gives birth as a result of ART, her partner is presumed to be a parent of the child. The ACT's birth registration process allows for a person to be registered as a 'mother', 'father' or 'parent', enabling lesbian couples to be recognised as parents on a child's birth documents.

=== Northern Territory ===
The Northern Territory was the second jurisdiction to extend a presumption of parentage to lesbian partners in 2003 with its Status of Children Act 2003, following Western Australia's lead in 2002. The Northern Territory became the last jurisdiction within Australia to legally allow both unmarried different-sex couples and same-sex couples to adopt children, when the Adoption of Children Legislation Amendment (Equality) Bill 2017 passed the Northern Territory Legislative Assembly in March 2018. The bill received royal assent on 19 April 2018, becoming the Adoption of Children Legislation Amendment (Equality) Act 2018 and commenced the following day.

=== Tasmania ===
The Status of Children Act 1974 states that the woman who gives birth to the child is the mother, regardless of genetics. The Act does make a mention of "parentage" of both co-mothers in section 10C, however a report back in 2003 by the Joint Standing Committee on Community Development proposed amending the Act to recognise the lesbian partner as a parent via the Relationships (Consequential Amendments) Bill 2003 but it failed to pass in the upper house by just one vote. In June 2009, the Relationships (Miscellaneous Amendments) Bill proposed reform to the state's Adoption Act and Status of Children Act, allowing non-biological lesbian parents to be legally considered the parents of a child conceived using IVF. The bill passed the lower house 45–3 on 20 August, opposed by three Liberal MHA's who had been given a conscience vote. The Legislative Council (Upper House) ratified the bill with amendments to back date the law to 1 January 2004 in October without dissent. The lower house approved of the amendments made in the upper house in November 2009 and then passed the Tasmanian parliament.

In 2012, Tasmania passed two pieces of legislation to legally allow altruistic surrogacy. The two laws are called the Surrogacy Act No 34 and the Surrogacy (Consequential Amendments) Act No 31. Proposed altruistic surrogacy legislation was drafted and passed by both houses of the Tasmanian parliament – only after a review of the Surrogacy Contracts Act 1993 No 4 and after an ongoing community consultation process. Under the altruistic surrogacy legislation, the surrogate must be at least 25 years old and it cannot be her first pregnancy. The new altruistic surrogacy laws went into effect on 1 May 2013.

=== Western Australia ===
The Human Reproductive Technology Act 1991 (WA) established that to use any ART, a woman must be unable to conceive a child for medical reasons (clinical infertility) and "persons seeking to be treated as a couple must be married or in a de facto relationship and must be of the opposite sex to each other".

In 2002, the Artificial Conception Act 1985 was amended to deal with lesbian couples. It stated that, where a woman who is in a de facto relationship with another woman undergoes, with the consent of her de facto partner, an artificial fertilisation procedure, the de facto partner of the pregnant woman is conclusively presumed to be a parent of the unborn child and is a parent of any child born as a result of the pregnancy.

Western Australia's Registry of Births, Deaths and Marriages allows for registration of a parent other than a 'mother' and/or 'father' on the birth documents of the child. The birth registration form provides same-sex couples with the option of describing themselves as 'mother' and 'parent'; 'mother' and 'mother'; or 'parent' and 'parent'. Provided proper consent has been given by both the woman and her same-sex partner, the partner will conclusively be presumed to be the parent of any resulting child.

The Surrogacy Bill 2007 was passed by the Legislative Assembly (Lower House) in September 2007, and was referred to the Standing Committee on Legislation within the Legislative Council (Upper House) in November 2007. It was sent back to the Legislative Council (with amendments to ban single people and same-sex couples from altruistic surrogacy arrangements) for a third reading in June 2008. The legislation was passed on 4 December 2008.

== See also ==
- LGBT parenting
- LGBT adoption
- LGBT rights in Australia
