= Rehabilitation of Offenders Act 1974 =

Act of the Parliament of the United Kingdom

Rehabilitation of Offenders Act 1974 (Note: Section 11(1).)
- Act of Parliament
- Parliament of the United Kingdom
- Long title: An Act to rehabilitate offenders who have not been reconvicted of any serious offence for periods of years, to penalise the unauthorised disclosure of their previous convictions, to amend the law of defamation, and for purposes connected therewith.
- Citation: 1974 c. 53
- Introduced by: Kenneth Marks (Commons)
- Territorial extent: England and Wales; Scotland; (Note: Section 11(3).)

Dates
- Royal assent: 31 July 1974
- Commencement: 1 July 1975 (Note: Section 11(2).)
Other legislation
Amended by	Drug Trafficking Offences Act 1986; Age of Legal Capacity (Scotland) Act 1991; Drug Trafficking Act 1994; Crime and Disorder Act 1998; Domestic Violence, Crime and Victims Act 2004; Criminal Justice and Immigration Act 2008; Defamation Act 2013; Criminal Justice and Courts Act 2015; Sentencing Act 2020; Sentencing Act 2026
Relates to	Rehabilitation of Offenders (Northern Ireland) Order 1978

Status: Amended

Text of statute as originally enacted

Revised text of statute as amended

Text of the Rehabilitation of Offenders Act 1974 as in force today (including any amendments) within the United Kingdom, from legislation.gov.uk.

The Rehabilitation of Offenders Act 1974 (c. 53) of is an act of the Parliament of the United Kingdom that enables some criminal convictions to be ignored after a rehabilitation period. Its purpose is that people do not have a lifelong blot on their records because of a criminal conviction in their past. The rehabilitation period is automatically determined by the sentence. After this period, if there has been no further conviction the conviction is "spent" and, with certain exceptions, need not be disclosed by the ex-offender in any context such as when applying for a job, obtaining insurance, or in civil proceedings. A conviction for the purposes of the ROA includes a conviction issued outside Great Britain (see s1(4) of the 1974 act) and therefore foreign convictions are eligible to receive the protection of the ROA.

Under the Legal Aid, Sentencing and Punishment of Offenders Act 2012 (section 139), the act as it applies in England and Wales was updated to provide new rehabilitation periods – with most convictions becoming spent in a shorter amount of time. For adults, the rehabilitation period is one year for community orders, two years for custodial sentences of six months or less, four years for custodial sentences of over six months and up to and including 30 months, and seven years for custodial sentences of over 30 months and up to and including 48 months. Custodial sentences of over four years will never become spent and must continue to be disclosed when necessary. Under the 2012 Act, the rehabilitation period starts on the date of conviction in the case of fines, but for custodial sentences it starts after the offender has completed the sentence (including time on licence) and for community orders it starts when the order ceases to have effect. For example, an offender who received a two-year prison sentence will see the conviction spent six years from date of conviction (two year sentence plus four year rehabilitation period). For offenders who are under the age of 18 when convicted, the rehabilitation period is half that of an adult.

A conviction that is spent under British law may not be so considered elsewhere. For example, criminal convictions must be disclosed when applying to enter the United States; spent convictions are not excluded for US immigration purposes under US law.

The act makes it an offence to obtain access to criminal records by means of fraud, dishonesty or bribery.

== Exemptions ==
Certain professions and employments are exempt from the act so that individuals are not allowed to withhold details of previous convictions in relation to their job when applying for positions in similar fields. These professions include:

- Those working with children and other vulnerable groups, such as teachers and social workers
- Those working in professions associated with the justice system, such as solicitor or barrister, police, court clerk, probation officer, prison officer and traffic warden
- Doctors, dentists, pharmaceutical chemists, registered pharmacists, pharmacy technicians, nurses or paramedics
- Accountants
- Veterinary surgeons
- Managers of unit trusts
- Anyone applying to work as an officer of the Crown
- Employees of the RSPCA or SSPCA whose duties extend to the humane killing of animals
- Any employment or other work normally carried out in bail hostels or probation hostels
- Certain officials and employees from government and public authorities with access to sensitive or personal information or official databases about children or vulnerable adults
- Any office or employment concerned with providing health services which would normally enable access to recipients of those health services
- Officers and other persons who execute various court orders
- Anyone who as part of their occupation occupies premises where explosives are kept under a police certificate
- Contractors who carry out various kinds of work in tribunal and court buildings
- Certain company directorships, such as those for banks, building societies and insurance companies
- Certain civil service positions are excluded from the act, such as employment with the Civil Aviation Authority and the UK Atomic Energy Authority.
- Taxi drivers and other transport workers.
- Butlers and other domestic staff

Aside from these trades and professions, the law also exempts organisations if the question is asked:

- By or on behalf of The Football Association, The Football League or Premier League to assess someone's suitability to work as, or supervise or manage, a steward at football matches.
- By the Financial Conduct Authority, Prudential Regulation Authority and certain other bodies involved in finance, when asked to assess the suitability of a person to hold a particular status in the financial and monetary sectors.
- To assess a person's suitability to adopt children, or a particular child, or a question about anyone over the age of 18 living with such a person.

However, disclosure of a criminal conviction where necessary, i.e. not covered by the Rehabilitation of Offenders Act 1974, or after the 2014 change, which introduced protected convictions, does not automatically bar a particular individual from employment in a given profession. For instance, notable cases include Gary Bell, a former fraudster turned high-profile successful barrister and Queen's Counsel; and solicitor Selwyn Strachan, who was convicted of murder in Grenada and served a sentence of 40 years. Similar cases can also be found in education, medicine, domestic employment, and other professions. In short, each case is determined on its own merits even where disclosure is necessary because the conviction either cannot become spent or is exempt from the protections of the act.

=== ROA where profession or employment is not subject to the exceptions or exemptions ===
For purposes of employment in a field that is covered by the Rehabilitation of Offenders Act 1974 and not subject to the Exceptions Order, once a conviction is spent, the person is considered rehabilitated and the act treats the person as if they had never committed an offence. As a result, the conviction or caution in question does not need to be disclosed by the person when applying for most jobs, educational courses, insurance, housing applications or other purposes, unless the role applied for is exempt from the act. If a role is covered by the act, it is unlawful for an employer to refuse to employ a person (or dismiss an existing employee) because the individual has a spent caution or conviction. It is also unlawful for an organisation to knowingly carry out (or enable someone else to obtain) a Disclosure and Barring Service (DBS) check on a person for a role which is covered by the act. If a role is covered by the act, the employer is only legally entitled to carry out a basic criminal check known as a Basic Disclosure (provided by DBS) which will reveal only unspent convictions.

=== Applications for adoption, fostering and for firearms certificates ===
There are also a number of proceedings before a "judicial authority" (widely defined) that are excluded from the act, and where spent convictions can be disclosed. These include applications for adoption or fostering, and for firearms certificates. Adoption and foster services are required to discuss with applicants if they have a criminal record and whether this raises concerns about their suitability to be a parent through adoption. All applicants have to have Disclosure and Barring Service (DBS) and other statutory checks undertaken. No convictions are regarded as spent for the purpose of adoption. DBS checks will record all past convictions, cautions and bind overs. Applicants will not be automatically excluded if they have a criminal record, though "[o]ffences against children or offences of a serious nature" will generally disqualify applicants.

=== Role of previous convictions in criminal proceedings ===
Previous convictions can be cited in criminal proceedings, even if they are spent. However, the Lord Chief Justice and the Home Office has advised the courts that spent convictions should not be mentioned except in very special circumstances.

Under the Rehabilitation of Offenders Act 1974 (the act) an offender who is sentenced to a period of 48 months' imprisonment or less (or a non-custodial sentence) becomes rehabilitated once a certain period of time specified by the act has passed. This means that the offender is treated for all purposes in law as though he or she had not committed or been charged or prosecuted or convicted of the offence.

Since 8 December 2008 cautions, conditional cautions, reprimands and warnings are all subject to the provisions of the act.

By virtue of section 7(2)(a) of the 1974 act rehabilitated or spent convictions are admissible in criminal proceedings where they are relevant to "the determination of any issue". This is a narrow exception, which allows a sentencing court to have regard to all previous convictions including spent convictions in determining the appropriate sentence. However, there are special rules about how spent convictions are to be presented in court. These are found in the Criminal Practice Directions [2013] EWCA Crim 1631 at CPD Evidence 35A: Spent Convictions which provides that:

- The court and advocates should avoid mention of a spent conviction wherever it can reasonably be avoided (Practice Direction paragraph 35A3);
- Any spent convictions shown on a record of previous convictions handed to the court should be marked as such (Practice Direction paragraph 35A3); and
- No reference should be made to the spent conviction in open court without the authority of the judge, which should not be given unless it would be in the interests of justice to do so (Practice Direction paragraph 1.6.6).

=== Role of previous convictions in sentencing proceedings ===
The Criminal Justice Act 2003, s. 143(2) provides that:

In considering the seriousness of an offence ('the current offence') committed by an offender who has one or more previous convictions, the court must treat each previous conviction as an aggravating factor if (in the case of that conviction) the court considers that it can reasonable be so treated having regard, in particular, to—

(a) the nature of the offence to which the conviction relates and its relevance to the current offence, and
(b) the time that has elapsed since the conviction.

As noted by some academic scholars, this provision creates "obvious tension". For instance, while this section indicates that a court is bound ('must') to treat each previous conviction as an aggravating factor, the mandatory words are somewhat softened by the later phrase, "if the court considers that it can reasonably be so treated". This provision in the Criminal Justice Act 2003 is also in tension with its "limited retributivism" theory of punishment, which underpins the sentencing framework in England and Wales. This is because, generally, increased punishment for subsequent offences based on previous offending is contrary to retributive principles of punishment and is more closely aligned with utilitarian theories of punishment. Further, in practice (and in contrast to the United States Sentencing Guideline grid, which governs sentencing practice and policy in the federal system) previous convictions, whether spent or unspent (and there is a ten-year time limit for consideration of adult convictions), do not lead to a linear increase in sentencing in England and Wales.

=== UCAS admissions and university applications ===
Applicants to university courses are only required to declare their relevant criminal convictions, cautions and verbal bind overs on their UCAS forms. UCAS applicants are required to declare only 'relevant' criminal convictions, 'relevant' being defined as offences against the person, whether of a violent or sexual nature, or offences involving supplying controlled drugs or substances where the conviction concerns commercial drug dealing or trafficking. Non-relevant criminal convictions, i.e. those not specifically defined as relevant, should not be declared unless specifically required on the application; applications which require disclosure of non-relevant criminal convictions are medicine, teaching and jobs related to or involving children. Criminal convictions are divided into two categories, relevant and non-relevant, and both can be considered spent under the act; once a conviction is spent, whether a conviction is relevant or non-relevant, it should not be disclosed on the UCAS application. More recently, the question concerning criminal convictions is no longer mandatory on UCAS forms and will not generate a hold. The impetus for this change is to broaden the availability of education and access to education. Spent criminal convictions are protected by s. 2 and s. 56 of the Data Protection Act 1998 and it is also a criminal offence to disclose an individual's spent criminal conviction.

== 2014 amendments ==
The amendments to the Rehabilitation of Offenders Act 1974 made by the Legal Aid, Sentencing and Punishment of Offenders Act 2012 in England and Wales came into effect on Monday 10 March 2014 and changed the way some rehabilitation periods are set so that they are fairer and better reflect the seriousness of the sentences imposed.

Under the new system, rehabilitation periods for community orders and custodial sentences comprise the period of the sentence plus an additional specified period, rather than all rehabilitation periods starting from the date of conviction as it was under the old regime. So, for example, an adult offender sentenced to two-and-a-half years' custody, who would previously have had to declare their criminal conviction for ten years from the date of conviction, now has to disclose their conviction for the period of the sentence plus a further four years (giving a total rehabilitation period of 6.5 years).

Under the reforms, the rehabilitation periods changed to:

For custodial sentences:

Sentence length	Previous rehabilitation period (applies from date of conviction)	New rehabilitation period
0–6 months	7 years	Sentence plus 2 years
6–30 months	10 years	Sentence plus 4 years
30 months – 4 years	Never spent	Sentence plus 7 years
Over 4 years	Never spent	Never spent

For non-custodial sentences:

Sentence	Previous rehabilitation period	New rehabilitation period
Community order (or youth rehabilitation order)	5 years	Period of order plus 1 year
Fine	5 years	1 year
Absolute discharge	6 months	None
Conditional discharge, referral order, reparation order, action plan order, supervision order, binding over order, hospital order	Various – mostly between one year and period of the order	Period of order, or 2 years if the order has no end date

As with the previous scheme, the above periods are halved for persons under 18 at date of conviction (except for custodial sentences of up to 6 months, where the buffer period will be 18 months for persons under 18 at the date of conviction). The changes were made "to finally tackle our stubbornly high reoffending rates that currently see almost half of all prisoners commit further crime within a year of release".

== See also ==
- Right to be forgotten
