= LGBTQ rights in the Australian Capital Territory =

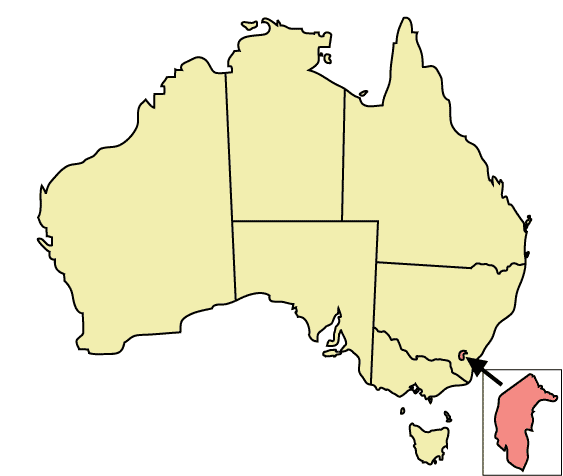
- Australian Capital Territory (Australia)
- Legal status: Always legal for women; legal for men since 1976; Equal age of consent since 1985
- Gender identity: Change of sex marker on birth certificate does not require sex reassignment surgery
- Discrimination protections: Yes (both federal and territory law)

Family rights
- Recognition of relationships: Same-sex marriage since 2017; Unregistered cohabitation recognised as "domestic relationship" since 1994
- Adoption: Full joint adoption recognition since 2004

The Australian Capital Territory (ACT) is one of Australia's leading jurisdictions with respect to the rights of lesbian, gay, bisexual, transgender and queer (LGBTQ) people. The ACT has made a number of reforms to territory law designed to prevent discrimination of LGBTQ people; it was the only state or territory jurisdiction in Australia to pass a law for same-sex marriage, which was later overturned by the High Court of Australia. The Australian Capital Territory, Victoria, Queensland and both South Australia and New South Wales (from 2025) representing a population of 85% on Australia – explicitly ban conversion therapy practices within their jurisdictions by recent legislation enacted. The ACT's laws also apply to the smaller Jervis Bay Territory.

Same-sex marriage has been legal in the territory since December 2017, following the passage of the Marriage Amendment (Definition and Religious Freedoms) Act 2017 in the Australian Parliament. The 2017 Australian Marriage Law Postal Survey, designed to gauge public support for same-sex marriage in Australia, returned a 74% "Yes" response in the ACT, the highest state or territory "Yes" response in the country. In November 2019, it was reported by the ABC media that Canberra has since been home to the most same-sex couple households (on a per capita basis) - not Sydney which defied Australian community expectations. This was reaffirmed within the most recent census as well.

== Laws regarding same-sex sexual activity ==
In May 1975, the now-defunct Australian Capital Territory Advisory Council passed an ordinance which decriminalised some aspects of male-to-male sexual activity and made the age of consent for homosexual sex to be 18, rather than the 16 years of age for heterosexual sex. This resulted in the Federal Government implementing the Law Reform (Sexual Behaviour) Ordinance 1976. It was not until December 1985 that the age of consent was equalised, with the enactment of the Crimes (Amendment) Ordinance 1985.

=== Historical conviction expungement ===
Since November 2015, people who have been previously convicted of consensual homosexual sexual conduct prior to its decriminalisation in 1976 can apply to have their convictions erased permanently from their records. To that effect, the Spent Convictions (Historical Homosexual Convictions Extinguishment) Amendment Act 2015 passed the Legislative Assembly on 29 October 2015 and went into effect on 7 November 2015.

=== Consent laws criminalizing transgender individuals ===
In July 2021, a huge deep concern was immediately raised that would “criminalize transgender individuals” who consent to sex within the Australian Capital Territory within a bill introduced – with the UK that implemented similar sex consent legislation recently. In May 2022, the "criminal reforms (sexual informed direct consent) bill" passed the ACT Legislative Assembly unanimously and is awaiting notification. Tasmania and NSW have similar legislation implemented.

== Recognition of same-sex relationships ==
=== Domestic Relationships Act 1994 ===
The Australian Capital Territory was the first jurisdiction in Australia to legally recognise the unions of same-sex couples, in the form of the Domestic Relationships Act 1994. The Act defined a domestic relationship in much the same way common law marriages are treated; a personal relationship between 2 adults (other than a married couple) in which one [or both] provides personal or financial commitment and support of a domestic nature for the material benefit of the other. The Act also provided for distribution of property and finances in the event of a separation, and inheritance in the event of death.

=== Civil Partnerships Act 2008 ===
In May 2008, after several attempts to amend the scheme, ACT Attorney-General Simon Corbell announced that the territory had abandoned its civil partnerships legislation, eliminated any ceremonial aspects, and settled for a system of relationship registers virtually identical to the ones operating in Tasmania and Victoria. The Commonwealth Government had not compromised at any point during negotiations. The legislation passed the ACT Legislative Assembly on 8 May 2008, giving same-sex couples increased access to superannuation, taxation and social security law reforms. While legislative ceremonies were removed from the bill, an administrative ceremony may be performed by a representative the ACT Register-General. The Civil Partnerships Act 2008 entered into force on 19 May 2008.

The Act was amended in 2009 to allow for same-sex couples to participate in an official partnership ceremony. This made the ACT the first territory/state in the country to legalise civil partnerships ceremonies for same-sex couples. The amended legislation required that same-sex couples register their intention to hold a ceremony and opposite-sex couples be barred from entering into a civil partnership ceremony. The Act was subsequently repealed as a result of the territory's implementation of the Civil Unions Act 2012.

Although the Act was repealed, civil partnerships have not been terminated. Such partnerships are now regulated by the Domestic Relationships Act 1994 (specifically part 4A of the Act), and couples, whether same-sex or opposite-sex, may still enter into such partnerships if they so choose.

=== Civil Unions Act 2012 ===
In August 2012, a civil union bill passed after legal advice demonstrated that the Federal Government had removed its ability to legislate for territorial and state same-sex marriage after it defined marriage as only between man and woman in the Marriage Amendment Act 2004. The bill granted many of the same rights to same-sex couples as people married under the Marriage Act 1961. The Act was not challenged by the Gillard government. The Act was to be repealed upon commencement of the Marriage Equality (Same Sex) Act 2013, which (if not struck down by the High Court), would have legalised same-sex marriage in the territory. Due to the High Court's ruling striking down the ACT's same-sex marriage law as invalid, the repeal of the Civil Unions Act 2012 was of no effect and civil unions could take place in the ACT until 2017. As of 2017, forming a new civil union is not possible as section 7 of the Civil Union Act 2012 requires that potential couples be unable to marry under the Marriage Act 1961. When same-sex marriage was legalised, it became legally impossible to form a civil union, though existing ones remain valid and entering into a domestic relationship remains an option.

The law required couples to enter into a civil union ceremony (also known as a "declaration") in the presence of at least a civil union celebrant and a witness.

=== Same-sex marriage ===
The ACT was the only state or territory jurisdiction in Australia to legalise same-sex marriage before it was made legal nationwide. This occurred in 2013 when the Legislative Assembly passed the Marriage Equality (Same Sex) Act 2013, with the Act going into effect and enabling same-sex couples to marry from 7 December 2013. However, the full bench of the High Court of Australia heard the Commonwealth Government's challenge to the ACT marriage laws on 3 December. On 12 December, the court ruled that the territory was not permitted to legalise same-sex marriage, as under the federal Constitution only the federal Parliament can legislate with regard to marriage.

Same-sex marriage became legal again in the Australian Capital Territory in December 2017, when the federal Parliament passed the Marriage Amendment (Definition and Religious Freedoms) Act 2017 and thereby legalised same-sex marriage in the whole country.

== Adoption and parenting rights ==
The Adoption Act 1993, as amended in 2004, states that "...an adoption order shall not be made otherwise than in favour of 2 people jointly (emphasis added), being a couple...married or not, (emphasis added), have lived together in a domestic partnership for a period of not less than 3 years", ensuring that same-sex couples can jointly adopt a child in the ACT.

Under Part 15.4 of the Children and Young People Act 2008, there is no prohibition to fostering children by a gay or lesbian person or couple. In November 2003, legislation known as the Parentage Act 2004 passed into law by the ACT Legislative Assembly ensured that the partners of lesbians who conceive children through IVF were recognised as legal parents.

Assisted reproductive technology and in vitro fertilisation are legally available for any individuals and couples - regardless of sexual orientation or marital status within the ACT. In 2000, the ACT became the first state or territory to allow the genetic parents of a child born through surrogacy to become its legal parents without going through an adoption process.

== Discrimination protections ==
The Discrimination Act 1991 covers grounds for unlawful discrimination with respect to sex, intersex status, HIV/AIDS status, sexuality and gender identity, among a host of other attributes. The ACT Human Rights Commission administers this Act and the Human Rights Act 2004, with a major aspect of its role being to handle complaints of discrimination, sexual harassment, vilification (on the grounds of race, sexuality, gender identity or HIV/AIDS status) or victimisation. Areas covered with respect to anti-discrimination protections include but are not limited to: work, employment agencies, services or facilities, accommodation, clubs, professional or trade organisations.

On 8 June 2016, the ACT Government introduced a bill which would expand the number of grounds upon which it is illegal to vilify or discriminate against someone in the ACT. Among a number of additions, the bill included "intersex status" and "altered sex" as protected traits. The bill unanimously passed the ACT Legislative Assembly on 4 August 2016, becoming the Discrimination Amendment Act 2016. Most parts of the new law went into effect on 24 August 2016, the day after notification. The remaining parts on the law come into effect on 3 April 2017.

== Transgender rights ==
Transgender and intersex people are permitted to change the sex listed on their birth certificate, under the provisions of the Births, Deaths and Marriages Registration Amendment Act 2014. The Act removed the requirement for such people to undergo sex reassignment surgery before being allowed to alter their sex on official documents. ACT law allows someone to identify as male, female or "X", following a doctor or psychologist certification indicating they have received what the Act terms "appropriate clinical treatment". Parents can also have their child's birth certificate changed if they believe it to be in the best interests of the child, though the child must have received "appropriate clinical treatment". Since 1 July 2024, under new enacted laws “appropriate clinical treatment” requirements have been repealed and abolished – instead it is done by way of self-determination, only for individuals who are 14 years old or older to change sex on a birth certificate within the Australian Capital Territory. However “appropriate clinical treatment” is continually required and mandatory for individuals who are under 14 years old – by way of both a court order from a magistrate, as well as parents and/or guardians permission of the individual who are under 14 years old.

Federal law also protects LGBTI people in the Australian Capital Territory in the form of the Sex Discrimination Amendment (Sexual Orientation, Gender Identity and Intersex Status) Act 2013.

In June 2023, a bill passed into law to immediately "protect and defend" full gender-affirming and abortion healthcare access without impediment – within the Australian Capital Territory in all its hospitals and clinics, regardless.

Since March 2024, individuals who are 14 years old and over "do not need parental or guardian permission to change sex or name" on a birth certificate – within the Australian Capital Territory, by recently implemented legislation.

== Intersex rights ==
In June 2016, Organisation Intersex International Australia pointed to contradictory statements by the ACT and other Australian governments, suggesting that the dignity and rights of LGBT and intersex people are recognized while, at the same time, harmful practices on intersex children continue.

In March 2017, representatives of Androgen Insensitivity Syndrome Support Group Australia and Organisation Intersex International Australia participated in an Australian and Aotearoa/New Zealand consensus "Darlington Statement" by intersex community organizations and others. The statement calls for legal reform, including the criminalization of deferrable intersex medical interventions on children, and improved access to peer support. It also calls for an end to legal classification of sex and stating that legal third classifications, like binary classifications, were based on structural violence and failed to respect diversity and a "right to self-determination".

As of 1 August 2017, the Australian Capital Territory is one of three states and territories to include protections specific to intersex people in anti-discrimination law.

Besides male and female, Australian Capital Territory birth certificates and identification documents are available with an "X" sex descriptor.

== Banning medical procedures on intersex babies and toddlers ==
In March 2023, a bill was formally introduced by the Chief Minister Andrew Barr to the ACT Legislative Assembly to legally ban "archaic medical procedures" on any intersex babies and toddlers – with huge fines and imprisonment within the Australian Capital Territory. In June 2023, the bill formally passed into law unanimously 25–0. The bill was formally notified a fortnight later by the ACT administrator and went into legal effect a year later in June 2024.

== Conversion therapy ==
ACT Health Minister Meegan Fitzharris said "The ACT government will ban gay conversion therapy. It is abhorrent and completely inconsistent with the inclusive values of Canberrans." In August 2020, a bill was formally introduced by the Labor-Green ACT government to ban conversion therapy. In the same month, the bill passed the ACT Legislative Assembly and will go into effect 6 months after notification. The Sexuality and Gender Identity Conversion Practices Act 2020 passed 14 to 11 with the Labor and Green parties in favour and Liberals opposing it. The ACT law on conversion therapy provides for both criminal and civil remedies against people who practice conversion therapy. Practicing conversion therapy on protected individuals could result in up to a year in jail, up to $24,000 in criminal fines, or civil redress provided by the ACT Civil and Administrative Tribunal. The bill was amended shortly before it was passed at the request of religious groups and ACT opposition leader Alistair Coe who feared the broad definition of conversion therapy would allow children to sue their parents. The ACT law banning conversion therapy went into effect on 4 March 2021.

4 Points to make about the ACT conversion therapy bill:

- (1) It also explicitly bans religious organizations practicing conversion therapy, not just health organizations.
- (2) It also makes it an offense to take an individual out of the Australian Capital Territory for the purposes of conversion therapy.
- (3) The penalty is only a maximum of 1 year under the bill.
- (4) It also has extrajudicial and extra-jurisdiction capacity (meaning an Australian Capital Territory resident can also face courts within that jurisdiction, if practiced within outside of the Australian Capital Territory).

In April 2024, it was reported that conversion therapy is still being practiced on LGBTQ individuals underground within the Australian Capital Territory - despite a law banning conversion therapy practices. A government review is being conducted to determine if further legislative changes are needed.

== Summary table ==
Same-sex sexual activity legal	Yes (Since 1976 for men; always legal for women)
Equal age of consent	Yes (Since 1985)
Anti-discrimination laws includes sexual orientation and gender identity or expression without religious exemptions	Yes
Hate crime and vilification laws includes sexual orientation and gender identity or expression	Yes
Intersex minors protected from invasive surgical procedures	Yes (Since 2024)
Same-sex marriage	Yes (Since 2017 – Australia wide)
Recognition in territory law of same-sex couples as domestic partners	Yes (Since 1994)
Full joint/step adoption as well as full parentage from both IVF and altruistic surrogacy procedures for same-sex couples	Yes
Gay sex criminal records expunged prior to 1976 and the gay panic defense abolished	Yes
Conversion therapy on minors outlawed	Yes (Since 2021)
Implemented birth certificate law reforms without impediments	Yes (Since 2024)
MSMs allowed to donate blood	Yes (Since 2026, monogamous only as a condition)

== See also ==
- LGBT rights in New South Wales
- LGBT rights in Australia
- Transgender rights in Australia
- Intersex rights in Australia
- Same-sex marriage in Australia
