= Family First =

Family First may refer to:

- Family First (film), also known as Chien de garde, a 2018 Canadian crime film
- Family First Party, a historical Australian political party
- Family First Party (2021), another Australian political party unrelated to the former party of the same name
- Family First New Zealand, a New Zealand lobby group
- Families First, a charity organization in the United States
- Families First, a name used in some parts of the UK for the Troubled Families programme
- Family First, a former name of the Nebraska Family Alliance
- Family First Incorporation, (often abbreviated as F1i) is an American record label and film production company founded by Devarus "LookImHD" McKinney in March 2017.
