= Spent conviction =

Spent conviction legislation allows the criminal records of offenders to be amended by removing some offences after a certain period of time. The idea behind spent convictions schemes is to allow former offenders to 'wipe the slate clean' after a certain period of time, depending on the offence.

== Australia ==
In Australia, a Commonwealth spent convictions scheme was introduced in 1990. Spent conviction legislation also exists in all states and territories. Spent conviction legislation varies significantly across jurisdictions.

There is generally no requirement to disclose a spent conviction. Spent conviction schemes allow criminal record checks to be amended to remove references to some offences after a period of non-offending. Spent conviction schemes also generally excuse a former offender from disclosing that information. However, there are some offences that never become spent, for example sex offences in some jurisdictions. Further, some kinds of employment, for example employment where people will be working with children, are exempt from spent conviction legislation. This means that employers are able to receive an employee's complete criminal record.

There are substantial differences between spent conviction schemes across Australia and it can be quite confusing for employers and employees to know what convictions can and cannot be taken into account.

== New Zealand ==
In New Zealand, spent convictions are governed by the Criminal Records (Clean Slate) Act 2004.

== United Kingdom ==
In the United Kingdom, spent convictions are governed by the Rehabilitation of Offenders Act 1974.

== Sources ==
This article incorporates text from a free content work. Licensed under CC BY 4.0 (license statement/permission). Text taken from Human Rights: Discrimination in Employment on Basis of Criminal Record, Australian Human Rights Commission, Australian Government.
