= Gay and Lesbian Teachers and Students Association =

Australian LGBT organisation active in the 1990s

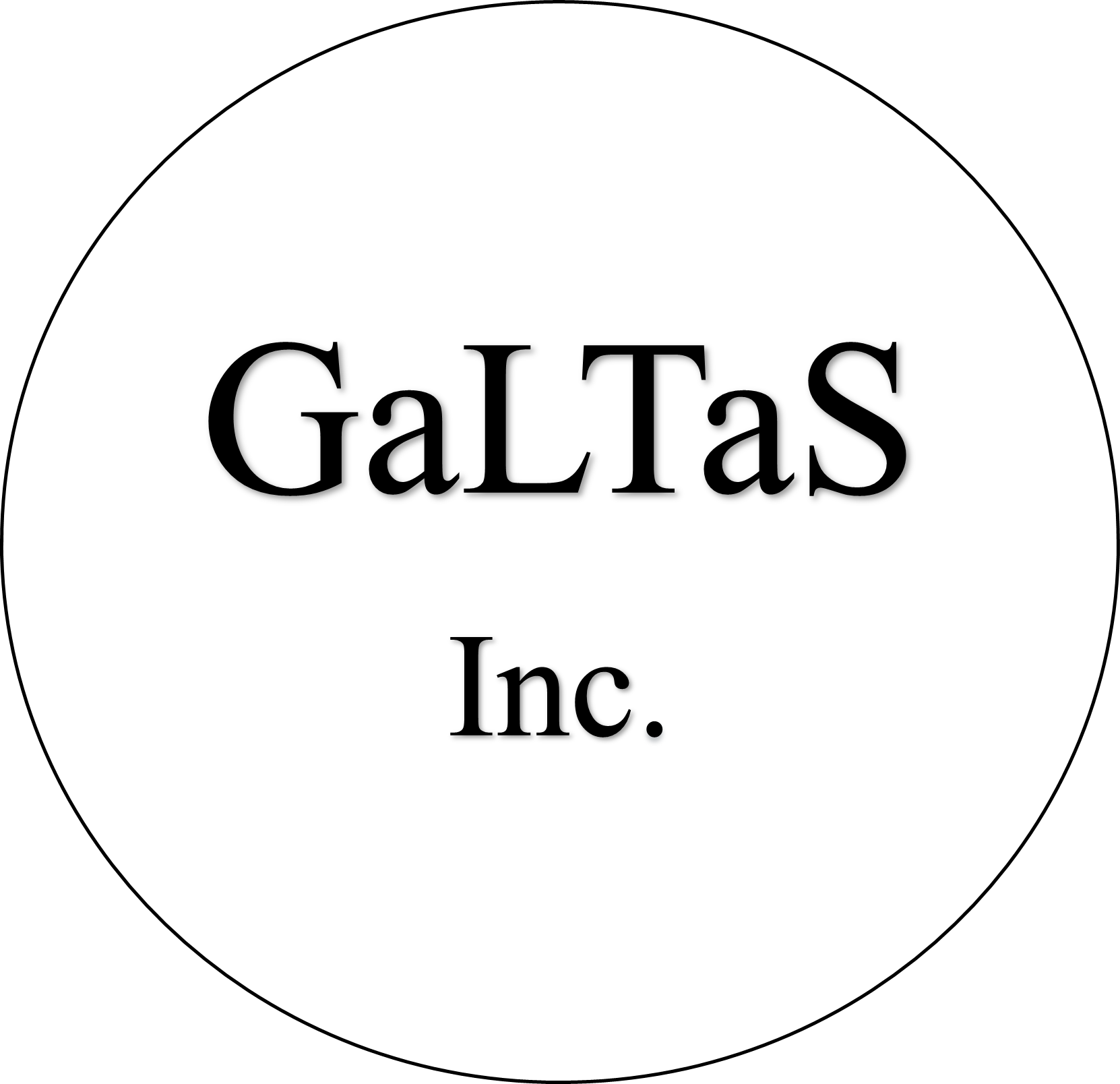
- Abbreviation: GaLTaS
- Formation: 1991
- Founded at: New South Wales
- Dissolved: 1998; 28 years ago
- Type: NGO
- Headquarters: Sydney
- Location: Australia
- Services: Activist and support organisation for lesbian, gay, bisexual, intersex and transgender students and teachers.
- Field: LGBTQ rights in Australia
- Co-convenors: Derek Williams; Jacqui Griffin

The Gay and Lesbian Teachers and Students Association (GaLTaS) was an Australian LGBT organisation active from 1991 to 1998 that was established during a wave of gay gang murders, to publicise widespread problems of anti-gay bullying and violence in Australian schools, as well as to offer support and a path to redress for its victims. It was founded by two Committee members of the New South Wales Gay & Lesbian Rights Lobby: gay activist Derek Williams, a New Zealand born teacher at Randwick Boys High School and Jennifer Glass, an 18-year-old lesbian New South Wales high school student. Williams was subsequently six times re-elected its male co-convenor, and after the resignation of Jennifer Glass, teacher (now lawyer) Jacqui Griffin became female co-convenor for the major part of GaLTaS' significant activism. Her GaLTaS SchoolWatch Report, and the association's landmark legal cases representing LGBT+ students and teachers led to changes in government policy that had far-reaching and longlasting impact. Integral to GaLTaS' success was the activism of its student members, and its dialogue with unions, politicians, police, parents, and parent organisations PFLAG and Parents and Citizens (P&C).

== History ==
A year into its existence, GaLTaS was registered on 17 September 1992 as an Australian Incorporated Society that was managed by a committee elected at each AGM, headed by two co-convenors. Parents were invited to all meetings, both individually and through the working association with PFLAG and the P&C. Previous attempts to set up support organisations such as the similarly named 'GAYTAS' in 1978 had not survived, with same-sex relationships at that stage still a criminal offence in New South Wales until law repeal in 1984, and in West Australia, Queensland and Tasmania until 1989, 1990 and 1997 respectively. However, GaLTaS prevailed after LGBT+ students themselves spoke openly to both LGBT+ media and mainstream media.

=== Background ===
Incipient moves to establish support networks for LGBT+ students and teachers included the Gay Teachers and Students Group (originally called the 'Gay Teachers Group'), established in Melbourne in 1975. This group spearheaded efforts to reform attitudes in relation to schooling and homosexuality by working with and seeking to influence, politicians and the broader community. In 1978, the group published Young, Gay and Proud, a book written for adolescents exploring a gay identity. An Americanised version of the same name was published in 1980. The Lesbian Teachers Group based in Sydney formed in June 1978, with the NSW Gay Teachers and Students (GAYTAS) group forming in 1979. The two groups worked both separately and collaboratively to agitate for change. Despite students being part of GAYTAS's name, the group did not have any student members. Nevertheless, they were attacked in Parliament by Mick Clough, who called for an inquiry to ensure that students were "protected from homosexual pressure". Clough also opposed decriminalisation of homosexuality in 1984.

=== Gay Gang Murders ===
The impetus to set up the new association for LGBT+ teachers and students had reached a crucial point following the murder convictions and 18-year prison sentences handed down in 1990 to 8 students (the "Alexandria Eight") from Sydney's Cleveland Street High School and a North Shore Catholic School for the gay-related killing of 33-year-old New Zealander Richard Johnson. Another group of 30 youths aged 12–18 (the "Bondi Boys") were active in throwing gay men to their deaths off the cliffs of Marks Park, Tamarama (colloquially euphemised as "cliff jumping"). As many as 88 men were killed, including Scott Johnson, Ross Warren, Gilles Mataini and John Russell, with their deaths initially dismissed as "suicide", "accident" or otherwise "not suspicious". Amid a spate of such attacks, gay Social Science teacher Wayne Tonks was also brutally murdered by two 16-year-old students from Cleveland Street High School after he had received threats at the school and had his Artarmon flat ransacked. Aside from the two who killed him, Tonks had previously taught three of the boys eventually convicted of Richard Johnson's murder. By 2023, there were still "50 to 100 persons of interest at least known" to NSW Police.

=== Political response ===
In February 1993, Education Minister Virginia Chadwick agreed to a meeting with GaLTaS at the New South Wales Parliament led by Derek Williams with former Gay and Lesbian Rights Lobby Co-Convenor, Carole Ruthchild and some of the students being subjected to homophobic victimisation and violence at their school. Following an interview with Chadwick and Williams by Quentin Dempster on the 7:30 Report, Chadwick announced a draft Procedures For Resolving Complaints About Discrimination Against Students, that would provide a means for LGBT+ students to achieve redress and complete their education. Following the publication of the SchoolWatch Report, this was eventually promulgated in 1996 and the New South Wales Education Department also published a revised Resources for Teaching Against Violence kit, which included a substantial section devoted to 'Violence and Homophobia'. These measures were primarily intended to reverse the escalation of ubiquitous homophobic student invective into serious crime such as assault and homicide that were having life-changing consequences not only for their victims, but also for their juvenile perpetrators.

==== The SchoolWatch Report and LGBT+ Youth Hotline ====
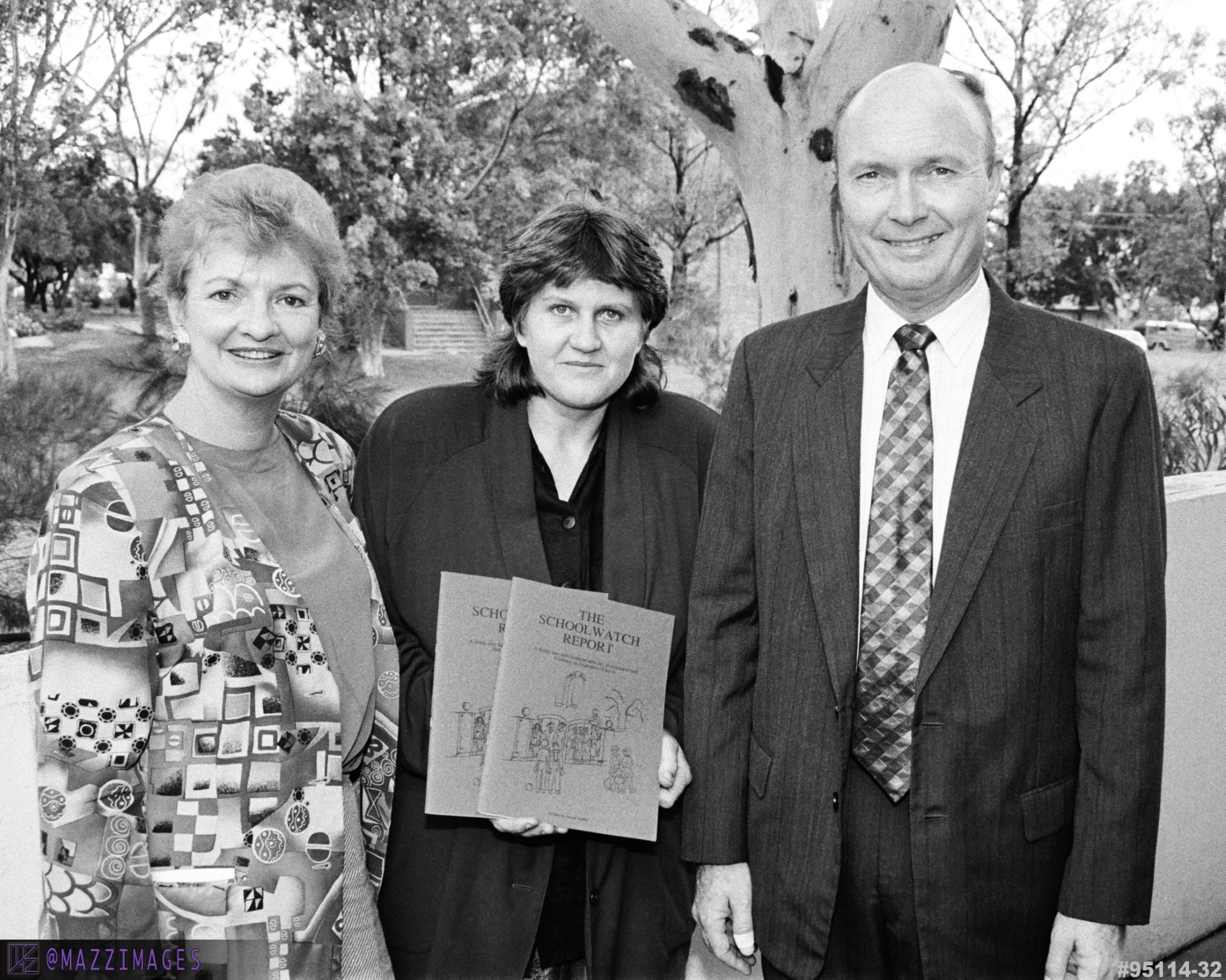
Education Minister Virginia Chadwick (left) at her launch for GaLTaS of Jacqui Griffin's (centre) SchoolWatch Report at Randwick Boys High School whose Principal Geoff McNeill (right) issued the invitation. First published in Sydney Star Observer.
(Photo: Mazz Images)

In March 1993, GaLTaS was awarded a Federal National Youth Grant of $30,000 (=c.$72,947.57 equivalent in 2026) by the Department of Employment, Education and Training to establish a toll-free telephone hotline for gay and lesbian student victims of homophobic harassment and violence in schools. A team of 18 counsellors was trained by GaLTaS parent convenor Kay Humphreys and counsellor Karen Paroissien during May 1993. More than 500 calls were taken after the hotline was launched on 17 July 1993.

Research from surveys conducted by Jacqui Griffin was compiled for inclusion in The SchoolWatch Report : A Study into Anti-Lesbian and Anti-Gay Harassment and Violence in Australian Schools, with foreword by Paul O'Grady MLC and Epilogue by Derek Williams. SchoolWatch was modelled on the Gay and Lesbian Rights Lobby's Streetwatch Report on anti-LGBT+ violence, launched in 1990 by Police Minister Ted Pickering.

A copy of Griffin's SchoolWatch Report was sent to Mrs Chadwick, who expressed alarm at its findings in an interview with The Sydney Morning Herald, confirming she had heard "very sad, and sometimes horrifying stories" about discrimination:

But I'd have to say I think equally sad are the stories you don't hear about the young people who drop out of school because they haven't told their parents, because their parents don't know they are gay, they don't tell their teachers because they fear they might not be understood or get support there. Rather than stand up for their rights and know there is a mechanism there to help them, they drop out. It is such a loss and a source of great concern for me.

Mrs Chadwick told the Herald she would have 'no difficulty' with reading lists of fiction and non-fiction books selected from a list provided by GaLTaS that provided positive images of LGBT people being placed in school libraries. Chadwick subsequently launched the SchoolWatch Report on 6 March 1995 at Randwick Boys High School in a ceremony attended by teachers, students, Griffin, Williams, the headmaster Geoff McNeill who had invited Chadwick, and the school's P&C. Following the launch, the SchoolWatch Committee was formed in June 1995 by Williams (with Griffin later becoming Secretary) to bring together representatives from the New South Wales Department of Education, the Board of Studies, the New South Wales Parents and Citizens Association, the New South Wales Teachers Federation, the Independent Education Union of Australia, the Catholic Education Office (CEO), the New South Wales Anti-Discrimination Board, independent MP Clover Moore and the NSW Police Gay Liaison Officer to address ongoing issues of school bullying, suicidal ideation, suicide among LGBT youth and homicide by students, via workshops, teacher training and books in schools programmes.

In September 1995, the New South Wales Legislative Council Standing Committee on Social Issues referenced the SchoolWatch Report data in A Report into Youth Violence in New South Wales, noting significant under-reporting:

It is of concern that of 37 students reporting incidents of verbal or physical harassment, 31 had not reported the most serious incidents to school authorities. (Submission 43). In two submissions to the Committee from school students, little sympathy was expressed for victims of this form of violence (Submissions 20 and 58). It was suggested to the Committee that 46% of young people involved in an anti-homophobia workshop in one school were not aware that it was illegal to bash homosexuals. A group of ten students, charged with the murder of a Sydney man at a park near their High School, expressed genuine surprise upon their arrest (in camera evidence). The Committee also heard that school personnel have demonstrated homophobic attitudes.

After the defeat of the NSW Liberal Party by Labor at the 1995 New South Wales state election, Chadwick was succeeded as Education Minister by John Aquilina, who later abruptly shelved implementation of her reforms.

In February 1997, as GaLTaS delegate, Williams addressed a Parliament of Australia forum on youth suicide convened by then Prime Minister, John Howard, working with Heather Horntvedt who represented PFLAG in her address to the forum.

==== Northern Territory ====
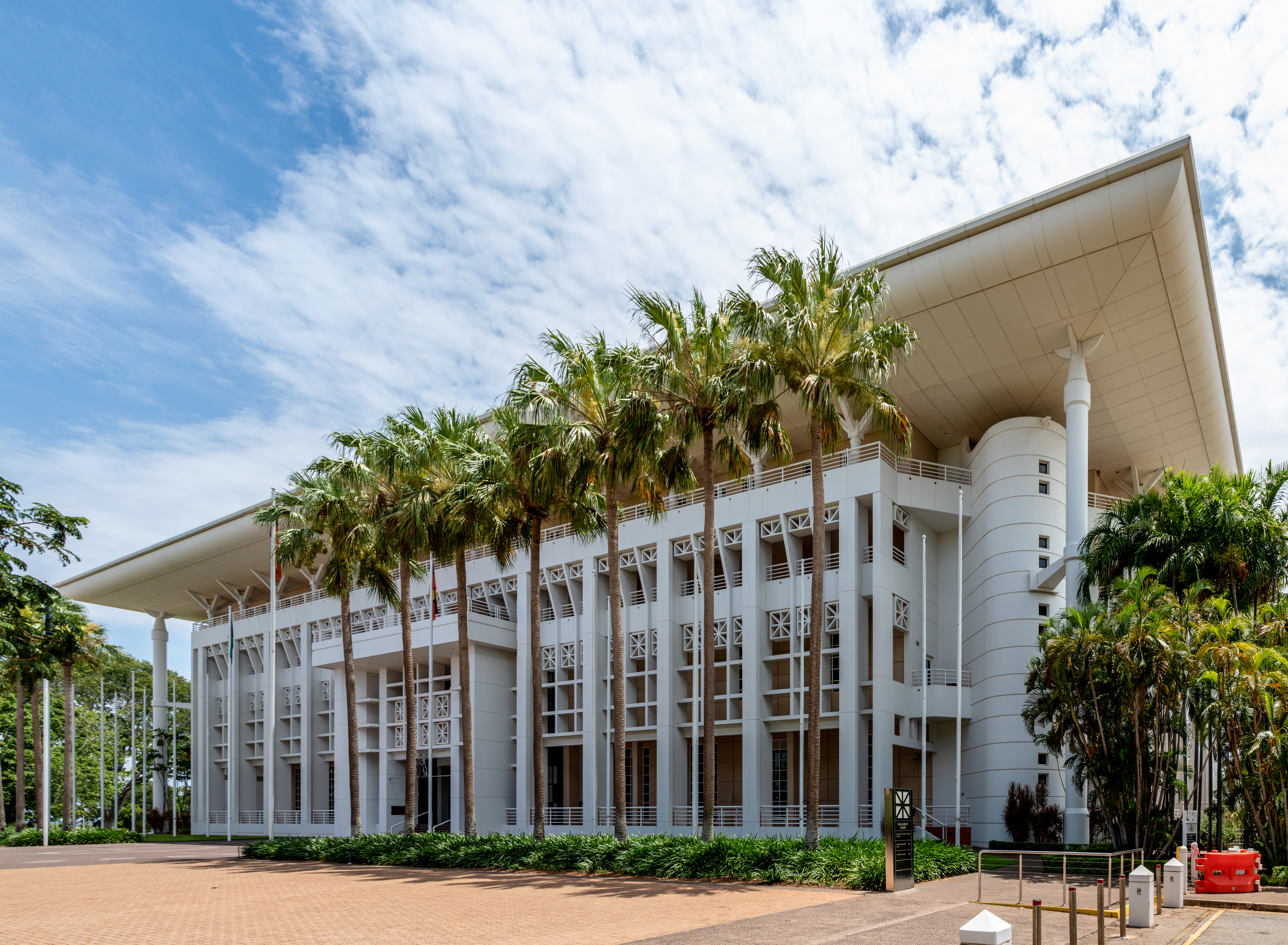
NT Legislative Assembly

Attempts to set up regional branches of GaLTaS sometimes met stiff political opposition. In February 1993, upon hearing Jacqui Griffin was setting up a GaLTaS office in her home town of Darwin in collaboration with the parent group PFLAG, NT Education Minister Mike Reed expressed concerns in an ABC radio broadcast that GaLTaS would "recruit impressionable children". He called GaLTaS "discriminating and bigoted" and said it was "about time they recognised they are a minority group." Nevertheless, 30 years later, the Northern Territory Government under Labor would revoke entirely all anti-LGBT religious exemptions from its anti-discrimination legislation, with Griffin in attendance.

=== Wood Royal Commission ===
During the Justice James Roland Wood Royal Commission into the New South Wales Police Service, Derek Williams represented GaLTaS in submissions on behalf of LGBT+ teachers and students. In an interview on the 7:30 Report by Quentin Dempster, Williams outlined the GaLTaS Code of Ethics and student welfare policy that had been revised the year before by Jacqui Griffin and adopted at a SGM in December 1995.

== Workshops and Conferences ==
GaLTaS was regularly called upon to convene workshops in schools and in Department of Education teacher training, as well as holding its own conferences. In her article for Kevin Jennings' book One Teacher in 10, Jacqui Griffin described her experiences dealing with homophobia among students when teaching Science, some of which became case studies for such conferences.

In 1994, led by Co-Convenor Margaret Edwards, GaLTaS held a conference at the Australian Museum titled Pride and Vision: The Way Ahead. Speakers included Clover Moore, Chris Puplick, Paul O’Grady and Julie McCrossin. The conference agenda included 'ignorance and homophobia', 'parenting gays/lesbians', 'gay rural youth', 'special needs of gay/lesbian students', 'breaking down stereotypes', 'coming out without the put-downs', 'HIV issues in schools' and 'strategies for homophobia reduction'.

== Political demonstrations ==
In every year of its existence, GaLTaS participated in the annual Sydney Gay and Lesbian Mardi Gras parade, often marching with PFLAG (Parents and Friends of Lesbians and Gays). Beyond its academic associations and liaisons with government officials, GaLTaS maintained high visibility through its participation with banners in street demonstrations of relevance to its anti-violence and anti-discrimination LGBT civil rights campaigns. In addition to its LGBT mandates, GaLTaS also championed equal rights for BAME and Disability networks, whose members were themselves oftentimes LGBT+.

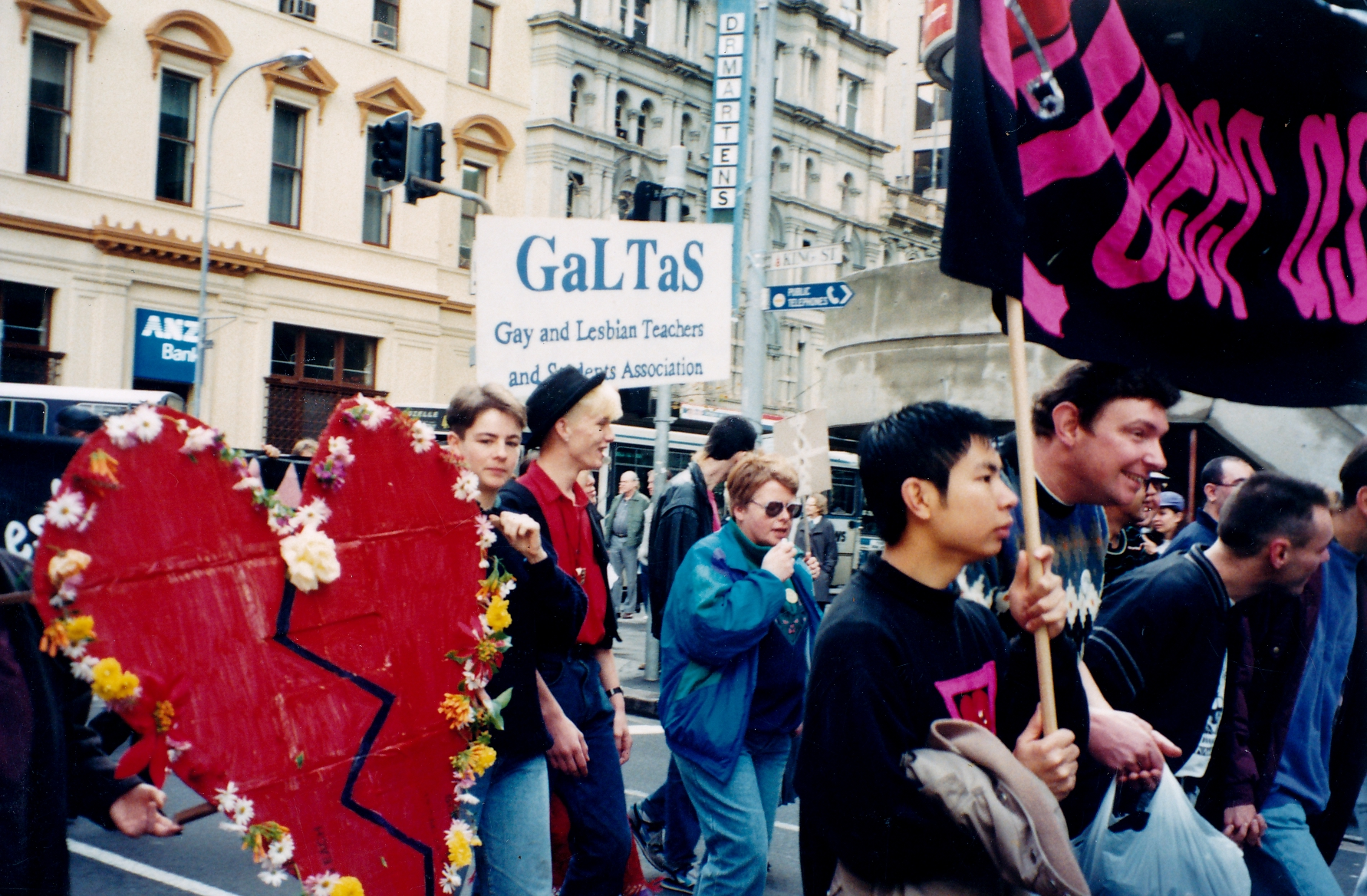
1. March on Parliament by GaLTaS group

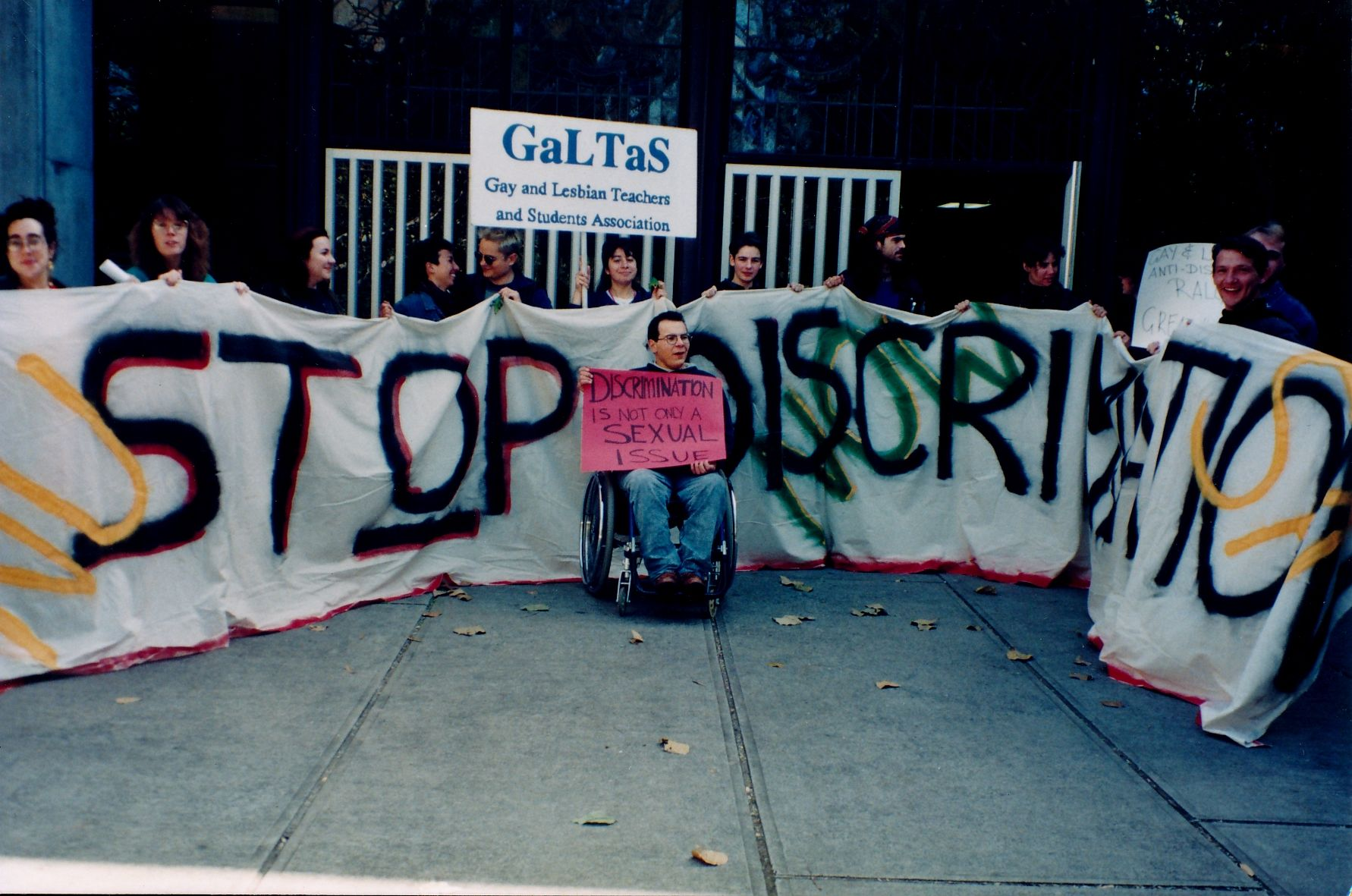
2. GaLTaS Newcastle University student demonstration 1994. Sign held by student committee member, Claudine Moutou.

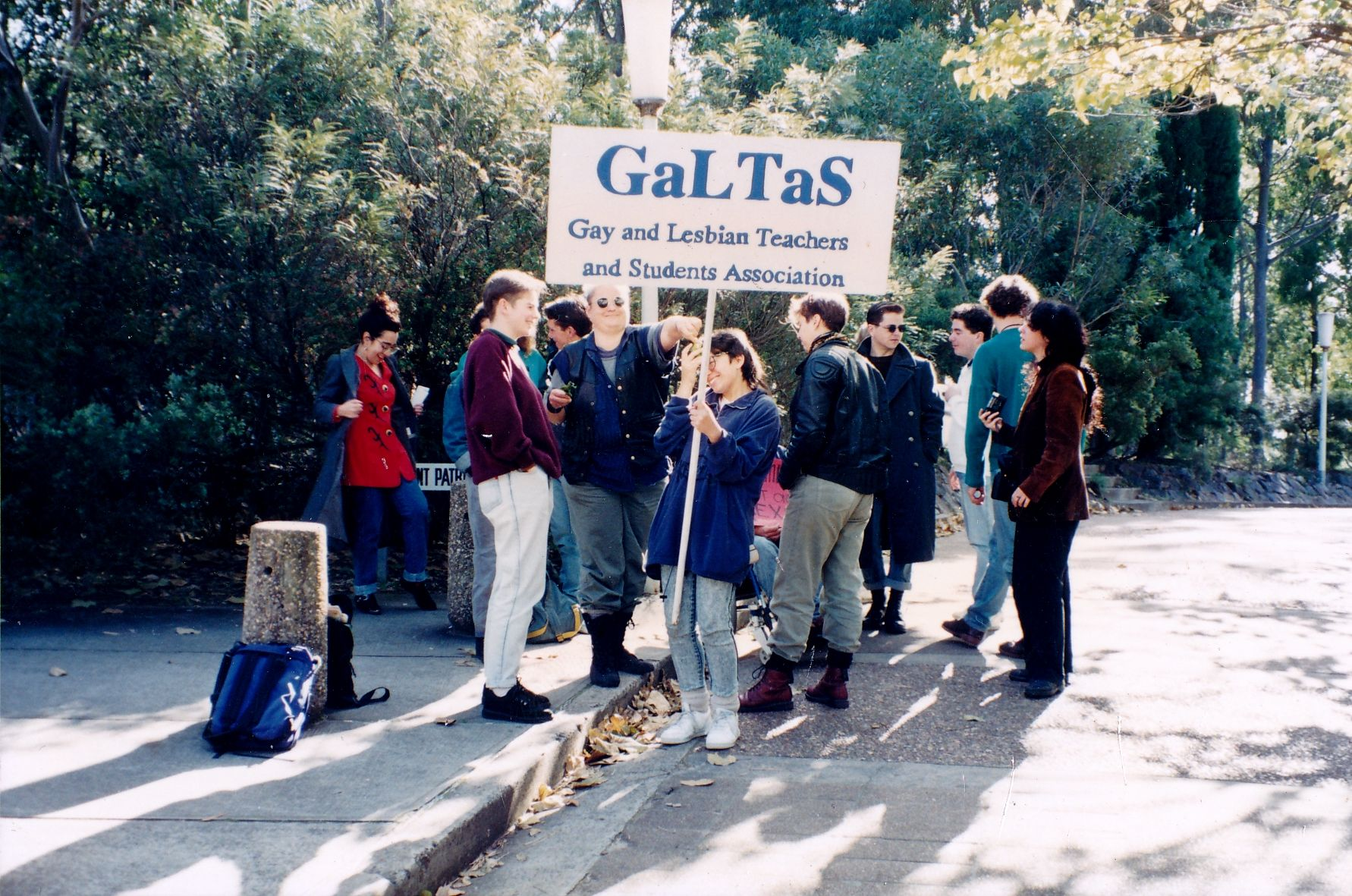
3. Newcastle Uni demo 1994, members of GaLTaS student group – Claudine Moutou holding sign.

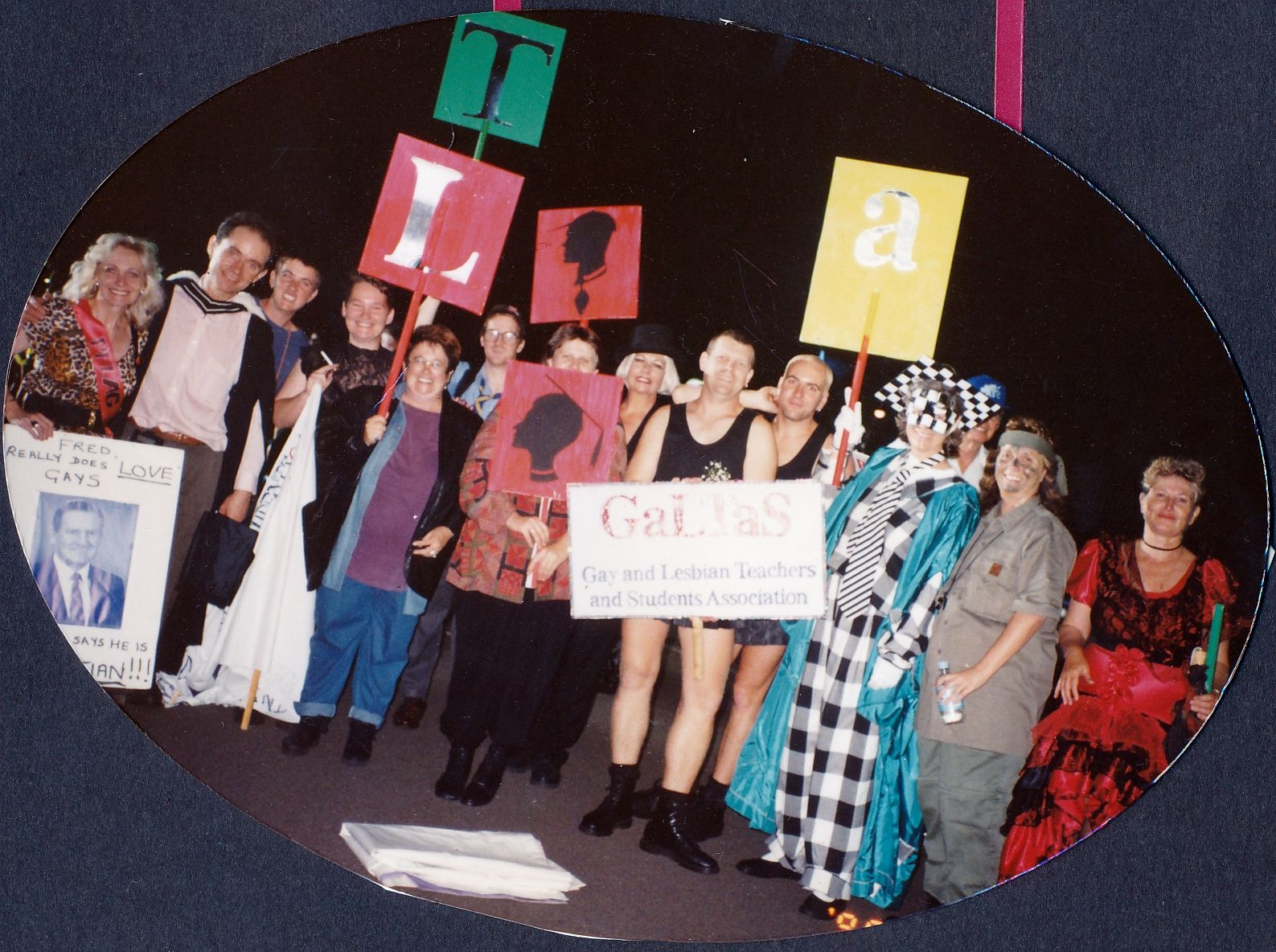
4. GaLTaS participants Mardi Gras 1996, PFLAG member Heather Horntvedt leftmost, next to GaLTaS Co-Convenor Derek Williams.

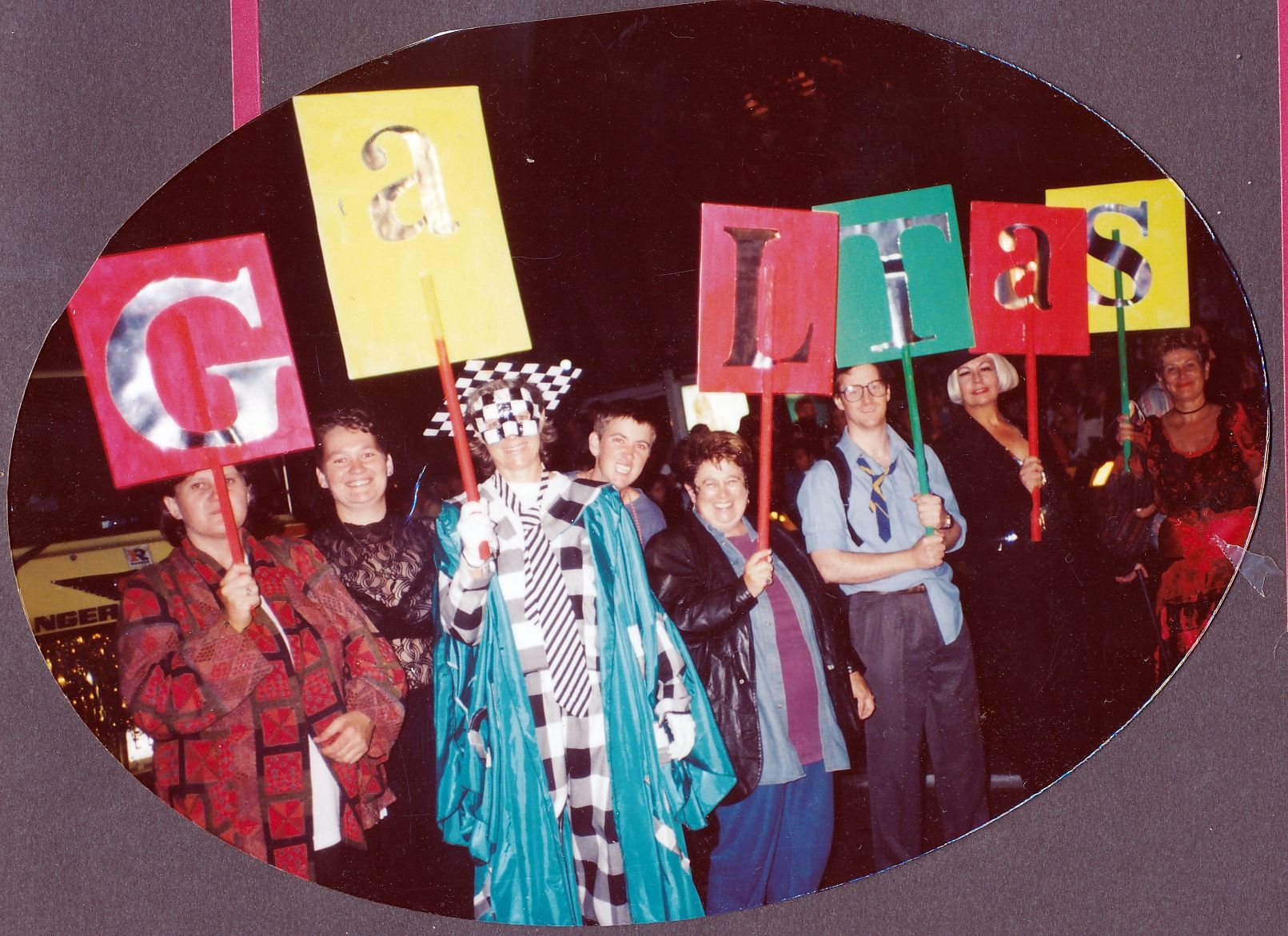
5. Mardi Gras 1996, leftmost GaLTaS Co-Convenor Jacqui Griffin

Photos 1-4: Jacqui Griffin, Photo 5: Derek Williams

== Legal activity ==
=== Breach of Duty of Care lawsuits ===
From April 1997, GaLTaS began assisting LGBT+ students suing their schools in a number of landmark cases alleging breach of Duty of Care by the Catholic Education Office (CEO) and the New South Wales Department of Education (DoE), that were eventually settled out of court under non-disclosure agreements.

An investigation by researcher Dr David Plummer at the Australian National University found that homophobia was endemic in Australian schools, and he had "uncovered behaviour that was more to be expected in jails than the supposed safe haven of schools." Plummer said, "My research details children being spat on, physically assaulted and terrorised. Often the assault is so savage, bones are broken in gang attacks."

==== Tsakalos v. DoE ====
In 1997, assisted by GaLTaS and Carters Law Firm, at age 14, Christopher Tsakalos became the youngest student ever to sue his school for anti-gay vilification and bullying. Tsakalos had already changed school several times and said he was "beaten up, abused and terrorised" by fellow students because he was gay. Nine Network's 60 Minutes broadcast the documentary Pride and Prejudice – Chris that showed students at West Sydney's Cranebrook High School yelling homophobic abuse across the school playground, along with interviews of Williams from GaLTaS, Cranebrook students, Tsakalos, his mother Vicky Tsakalos, and the headmistress.

The Assistant Director General of Education, George Green, told the Sydney Morning Herald the matter was being taken extremely seriously, and that he was "investigating the matter personally", but he disputed claims that nothing had been done to help Tsakalos, who he said had longstanding "learning and attendance difficulties". Despite being in direct communication with GaLTaS, Green said he believed there was "no evidence that homophobia was causing big problems in NSW schools," however, the President of the NSW Anti-Discrimination Board and NSW Privacy Commissioner, Chris Puplick challenged claims by the Education Department that abuse of homosexual students in NSW schools was rare. Puplick alleged the department was ignoring clear evidence of widespread vilification of gay pupils and was therefore "morally culpable" for the violence and harassment experienced by significant numbers of students. The department responded that "the strongest possible action is taken but we cannot act if incidents are not reported to us," thereby lending credence to evidence of widespread under-reporting by LGBT+ victims given to the Legislative Council Standing Committee on Social Issues in its Report into Youth Violence. Alongside its data documenting bullying and violence against LGBT+ students, the GaLTaS SchoolWatch Report submitted to the council had by then already uncovered significant under-reporting by victims out of fear of reprisals, and outing to their families and peers.

The Tsakalos case had first been publicly raised by Williams in his address to the Australian Parliament on 28 February 1997 before the decision was taken to sue the Department of Education for breach of Duty of Care, in what Williams said would be a test case. A barrister involved in the case assessed likely damages at $200,000 (=c.$445,377 equivalent in 2026). In a last-minute out-of-court agreement between the parties, the department undertook to provide a safe school for Tsakalos. Under the settlement, the DoE provided drivers to collect him from his home and return him there on schooldays, and chaperons to ensure his safety during his time at school. The story was taken up in major mastheads, both nationally and internationally, but suffered entirely negative press coverage in the Daily Telegraph, which accused Tsakalos of faking it, and GaLTaS of coaching him, while also suggesting LGBT+ students deserve to be bullied.

==== Brilley v. CEO ====
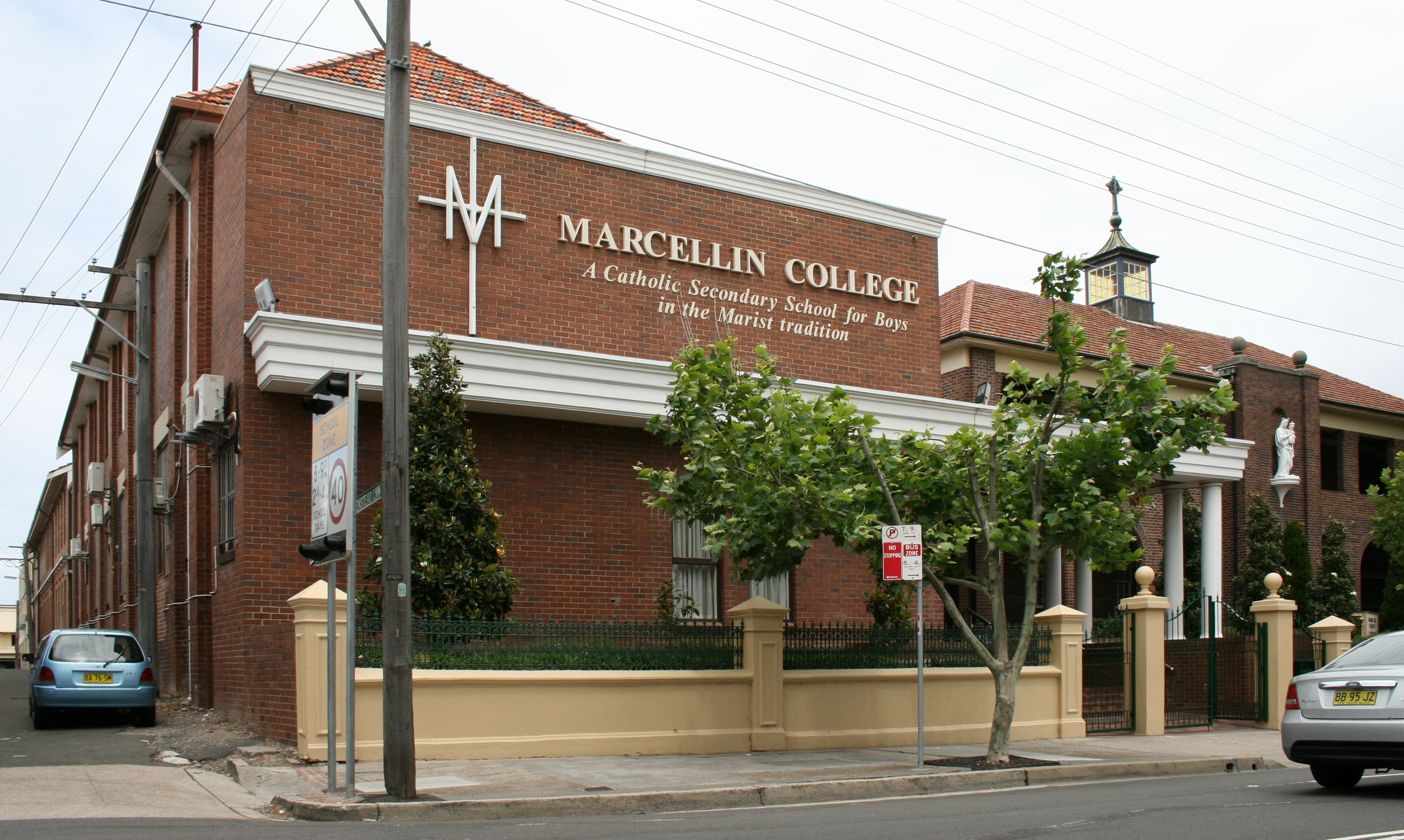
Marcellin College Randwick

Also in 1997, again assisted by GaLTaS and Carter's Law Firm, gay student James Brilley sued his private Catholic high school, Marcellin College Randwick for breach of duty of care and anti-gay vilification. Brilley alleged that teachers witnessed his fellow students' homophobic abuse against him, "but had done nothing to prevent it." Instead, Brilley stated that from the age of 14, he was sent regularly by the school's principal to the Prince of Wales Hospital's Adolescent Unit, where he was given counselling and medication without his mother's consent. After collapsing at his school as a result of his experience, Brilley spent 4 months in psychiatric care at St Vincent's Hospital's Caritas Psychiatric Unit. Despite Catholic schools' religion-based exemption from the Anti-Discrimination Act, the matter was settled out of court under a non-disclosure agreement for a six-figure sum. Williams told the Sydney Star Observer, "The CEO accepts public money to assist in funding their schools; they should therefore have to obey the same Anti Discrimination laws that apply to the rest of the community." In light of Brilley's complaint, and echoing Williams' call for the law to be reformed, Chris Puplick stated, "Students' rights should not be contingent upon their particular school." Brilley's treatment fell short of the Catholic Education Commission's (CEC) own denouncement of discrimination, both in the Anti-Discrimination Board's 1982 report, Discrimination and Homosexuality:

Catholic authorities have made it clear that they deplore personal discrimination against homosexuals … homosexuals are assured of acceptance, and guaranteed the human rights enjoyed by others.

and in its 1993 syllabus Towards Wholeness – A Catholic Perspective on Personal Development, Health and Physical Education Year 7-10 under the heading 'Information about adult lifestyles related to sexuality – heterosexuality, homosexuality, bisexuality', where it states:

Teachers through example and through formal teaching programs should reinforce what the Church has stated, that it is deplorable that homosexual persons have been the objects of violent malice in speech or in act. Such treatment deserves condemnation from the Church's pastors wherever it occurs. (New South Wales Catholic Education Commission, 1993:6)

=== Dismissals under anti-discrimination law exemptions ===
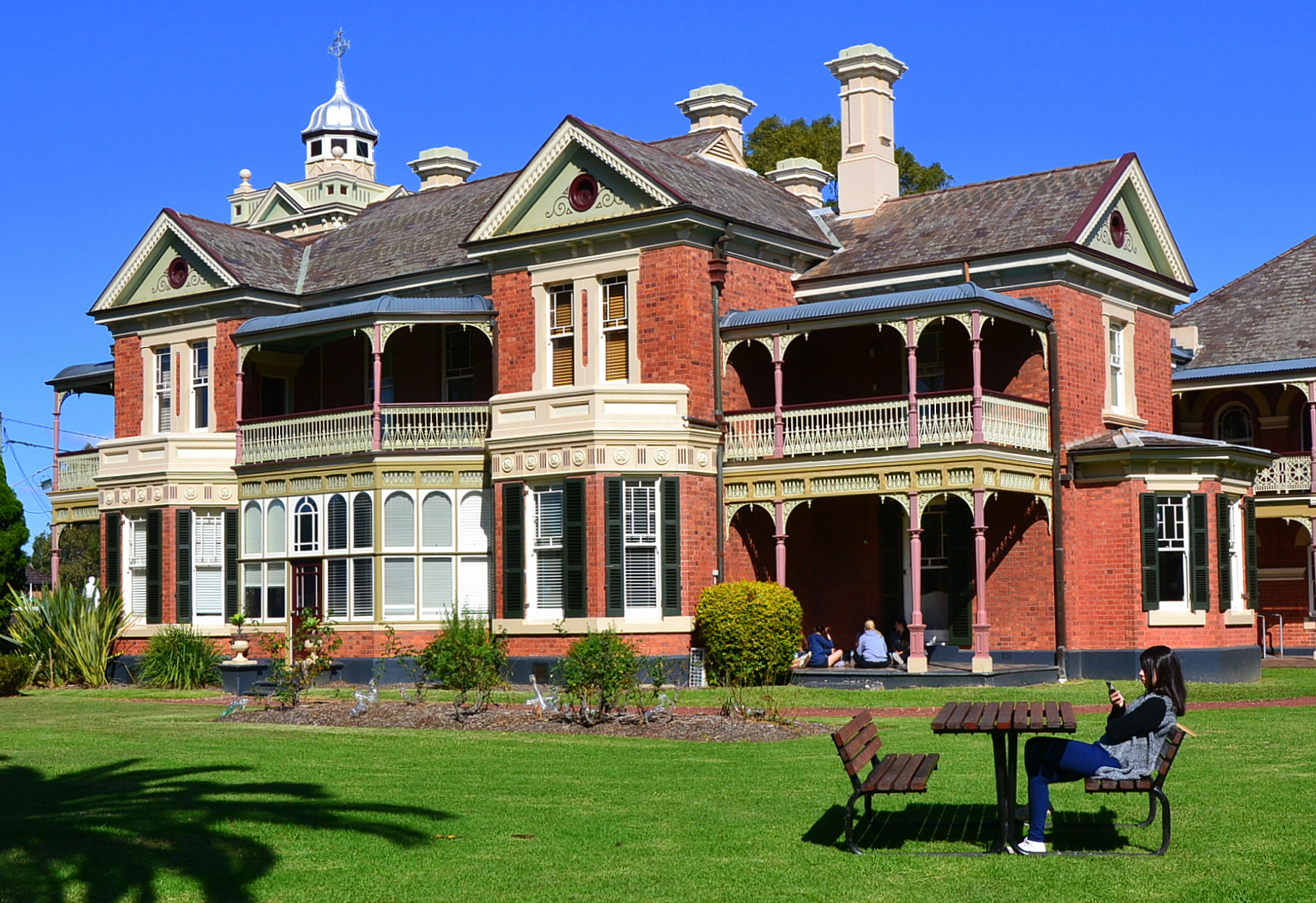
Australian Catholic University, Strathfield campus

In October 1992, the Deputy Principal of the Australian Catholic University, Brother Dan Stewart refused GaLTaS permission to establish a student group on its campus, following a meeting with a GaLTaS trainee teacher member enrolled there. Stewart accused GaLTaS of contriving and politicising an issue "contrary to the stated ethos of the university", however, the federal Minister for Education, Peter Baldwin said he was very disappointed by the university's decision; "Gays and lesbians, like any other students, should be allowed to meet and offer each other support without fear of repercussion from the university administration."

From May 1993, GaLTaS began to call on the NSW parliament to remove private schools' LGBT+ related exemptions from the New South Wales Anti-Discrimination Act 1977.

==== Saidi v. CEO ====
On 10 March 1995, 25-year-old Computer Science teacher Peter Saidi alleged constructive dismissal by the Catholic Education Office from his position at Freeman Catholic College after his employers learned he had marched with the GaLTaS float at the Sydney Gay and Lesbian Mardi Gras the preceding Saturday. The following day, more than 500 students and parents staged a school revolt on the school oval in support of Saidi, while all 1100 students of the school signed a petition demanding his immediate reinstatement. Despite the strong support for him from the students and parents, Saidi told Capital Q newspaper, "I was made to resign so that when I go seek employment elsewhere, I would look more favourable than I would had I been sacked". Derek Williams told the Daily Telegraph that because anti-LGBT+ discrimination was legally permitted in these schools under religious exemptions to the Anti-Discrimination Act, "students were being cocooned from laws that would eventually apply to them when they left school." Independent Education Union (IEU) Secretary General Dick Shearman responded that the IEU could not defend Saidi because non-government schools were exempt from anti-discrimination legislation. "Whether you agree or disagree with that view, it happens to be the law as it stands in New South Wales, and we have to operate within that in any legal sense." After realising the extent of support for him within the student and parent body, Saidi unsuccessfully attempted to walk back his resignation, and the students ended their strike after the school threatened to withhold their academic results. He was thereafter employed as a Computing Studies and Maths teacher by the New South Wales Department of Education.

==== Griffin v. CEO ====
While NSW state law could offer Peter Saidi no protection against religion-based anti-LGBT+ discrimination, the federal Human Rights & Equal Opportunity Commission (HREOC) was prepared to rule on such cases, based on Australia's commitment to international human rights law. Even though any finding in favour of an appellant would be a paper tiger, it would still bring anti-LGBT+ discrimination into the public eye through being tabled in the federal parliament.

In 1997, Jacqui Griffin won her discrimination case filed with HREOC under Chris Sidoti against the Sydney Catholic Education Office for refusing her employment on the basis of her GaLTaS co-convenorship, with Derek Williams appearing as witness representing GaLTaS. Griffin argued that GaLTaS advocacy for schools free of violence and discrimination directed against homosexuals was compliant with the Catholic Church's own declarations in 1982 and in 1993, and that moreover, the CEC had itself explicitly stated that homosexuals could be teachers:

Persons who are homosexually oriented should be eligible for employment in any occupation and homosexual teachers have this right.

Williams also told the hearing, "The aims of GaLTaS are not to promote homosexual activity..." Sidoti later commented in the report:

If the employment of Ms Griffin would injure the religious susceptibilities of these students and their parents, the injury would be founded on a misconception. Indeed it would be not an injury to their religious susceptibilities but an injury to their prejudices.

The CEO rejected the HREOC finding; nonetheless, in March 1998 Sidoti submitted his decision to the Attorney General Daryl Williams for tabling in the Federal Parliament, declaring the church's assertions 'gratuitous and scurrilous'.

In his book The High Price of Heaven, author David Marr wrote that the Griffin matter was "deeply embarrassing for the Catholic Church. It had to concede that the GaLTaS aim of protecting homosexual and lesbian kids from harassment squared with the church's own teaching as laid down by the Congregation of the Doctrine of the Faith."

The Presbyterian Church of Queensland later adduced Griffin's HREOC win in support of its claims of competing rights and alleged abrogation of Freedom of Religion in its submission to the Australian Commonwealth Parliament Inquiry into the Status of the Human Right of Freedom of Religion or Belief that had been called in 2016 by the Minister for Foreign Affairs, the Hon. Julie Bishop. However, the inquiry lapsed when the Joint Standing Committee disbanded at the dissolution of the House of Representatives in April 2019.

== Media representation ==
In 1997, The Sydney Daily Telegraph, a conservative tabloid opposition to the Sydney Morning Herald and The Australian, interviewed anti-LGBT+ school bullies who claimed their gay student victims were asking for it with their camp behaviour, insinuating that they were bringing upon themselves mistreatment at the hands of students and staff at their schools. The Telegraph devoted its entire front page to the Christopher Tsakalos lawsuit, with the imperative headline "Walk Like a Man", featuring a full-height photograph they had taken of Tsakalos with his protest placard drooped over one shoulder, highlighting the improbability of him ever walking like a "real" man. Reporters from the Daily Telegraph also pursued the Tsakalos story in an article titled "Gay boy asked for it – students" (Trute & Angelo, 1997) in which it was implied that Tsakalos's court case was suspect because, as his fellow students suggested, "he brought it upon himself" and they moreover resented him taking legal action. (Trute & Angelo, 1997, p. 3). In another report in the Daily Telegraph, Miranda Devine, well known for her critical comments on gender and LGBT+ issues argued that anybody who is different, such as Tsakalos, is an "easy target" in the schoolyard and that preventing such harassment is impossible:

In order to protect Christopher and children like him from being ostracized, you would have to make mincing homosexuality the norm in schools. The torment he has suffered has less to do with his homosexuality than the fact he is different from his peers.

Devine also questioned the authenticity of Tsakalos' camp performance, suggesting it had been stage-managed by GaLTaS to gain financial reward and to make him into "an international poster boy for the homosexual movement" (Devine, 1997, p. 10.) The assertion, also made by George Green, was strenuously denied as "absolute rubbish" by Tsakalos' mother, Vicky on ABC Radio, and in a letter to the Telegraph editor.

Elsewhere, GaLTaS secured a largely sympathetic media portrayal of LGBT people, especially from the Sydney Morning Herald as well as television documentaries, in its efforts to bring LGBT youth vulnerability into public focus. In 1992, for example, the Nine Network TV series Sex broadcast a "Homosexuality" episode, a televised dinner hosted by actress Sophie Lee, with Australian Medical Association (AMA) President, Dr Kerryn Phelps as medical reporter, Festival of Light politician and outspoken LGBT+ rights opponent, Fred Nile, as well as representatives from Parents and Citizens (P&C) associations and Williams representing GaLTaS. Williams and Phelps were subsequently interviewed by Liz Hayes on the Today Show about school-based homophobia.

The Australian Broadcasting Corporation (ABC) and Channel 9's 60 Minutes also broadcast television documentaries covering GaLTaS' endeavours to keep LGBT+ students at school. The ABC's Attitude documentary Homophobia, which featured a report on the Harvey Milk High School, included interviews with LGBT students, parents, Jacqui Griffin and filmed Derek Williams teaching at Randwick Boys High School, whose supportive principal Geoff McNeill was also interviewed.

== Repeal of religious exemptions ==
Australian States, Territories and Commonwealth jurisdictions vary greatly in their exceptions to anti-discrimination law for religious educational institutions in relation to students and staff.

On 10 April 2019, the Attorney-General issued Terms of Reference requesting the Australian Law Reform Commission (ALRC) to conduct an Inquiry into the Framework of Religious Exemptions in Anti discrimination Legislation. However, on 3 November 2022, the Attorney-General withdrew the terms of reference for the Inquiry, which was then abandoned following the shelving of the Coalition's contentious Religious Discrimination Bill. Existing exemptions already gave religious and independent schools the legally protected right to expel LGBT+ students and to fire LGBT+ teaching and ancillary staff on the grounds of their real or perceived sexual orientation or gender. Nevertheless, notwithstanding the collapse of the Religious Discrimination Bill, Law & Justice Professor Lucas Lixinsky of the University of New South Wales argued that religious schools could still engage in constructive dismissal wherein "the prohibition of expelling a student or firing a teacher creates an incentive for creating hostile educational and work environments".

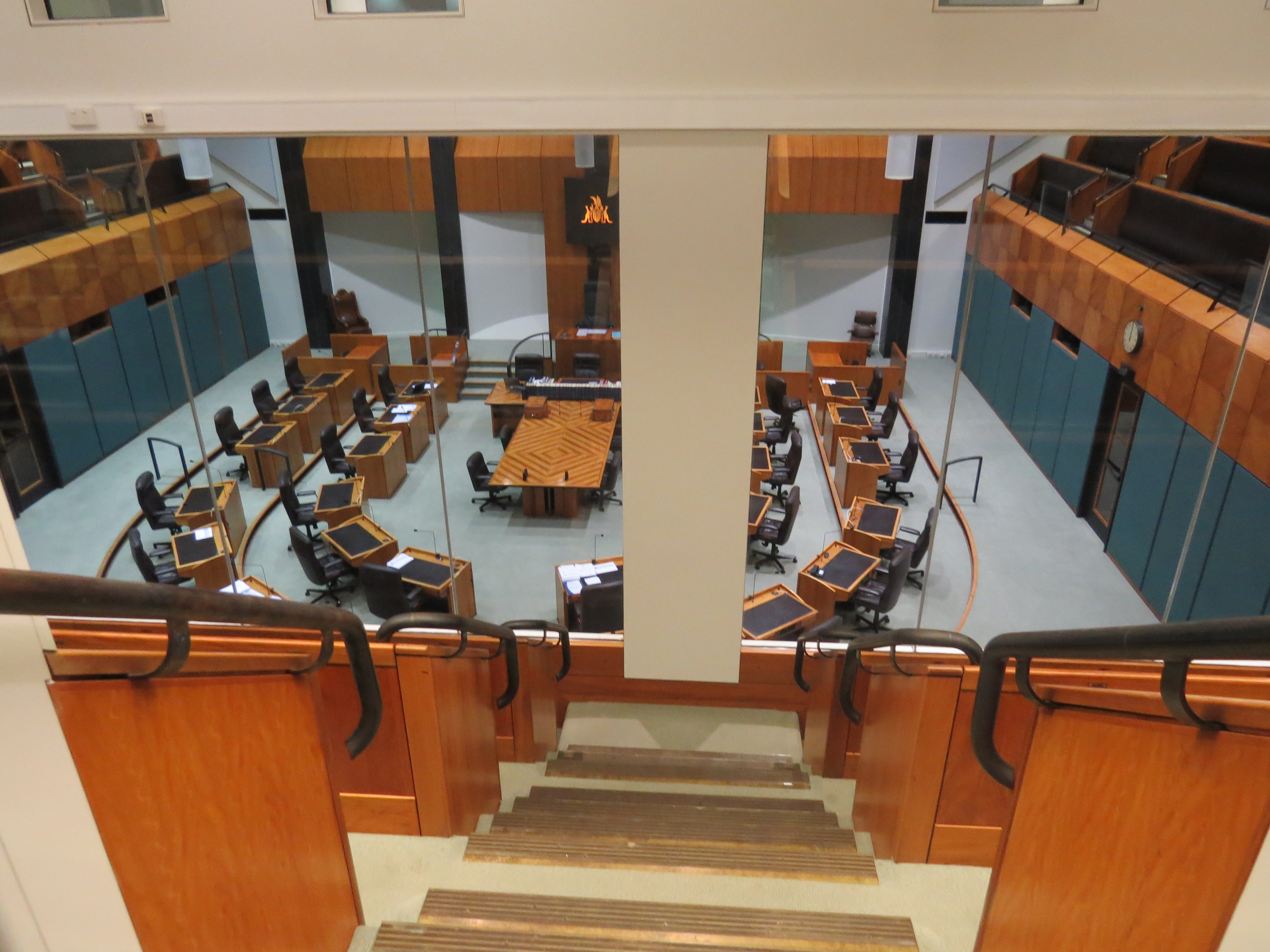
Northern Territory Legislative Assembly Chamber

Meanwhile, in the Northern Territory (NT), after a period of consultation, the Anti-Discrimination Amendment Bill 2022 (NT) removing 'limited' religious exemptions in areas of education – section 30(2), work – section 37A and accommodation – section 40(2A) was passed in the Northern Territory Legislative Assembly on 22 November 2022, with Jacqui Griffin present in the House. While this was welcomed by the NT LGBT+ group Rainbow Territory, who had made a submission in January 2018 to the NT Government calling for reform, it was opposed by the Country Liberal Party, who promised to repeal it, and was objected to by religious bodies as eroding religious freedom.

On 27 January 2023, the ALRC released its consultation paper, Religious Educational Institutions and Anti-Discrimination Laws, in which the Australian government declared commitment to reforming federal anti-discrimination laws to ensure religious educational institutions no longer "discriminate against a student or member of staff on the basis of sexual orientation, gender identity, marital or relationship status or pregnancy". The proposed reform did not otherwise limit the right of religious institutions to give good-faith preference to persons of the same religion as the educational institution in the selection of staff. In light of the large volume of submissions received, amended Terms of Reference were promulgated 20 April 2023, and the report was released 14 December 2023. It was tabled in Parliament 21 March 2024.

In December 2023, Saint Ursula's College, Kingsgrove ended its ban on same-sex partners for LGBT+ students attending the school formal after a Change.org petition launched by a student against its "discriminatory policy" had reached 4,900 signatures. Federal education minister, Jason Clare, had urged the Catholic school to rethink the ban and "show a little bit of common sense", saying "It's 2023. You should be able to take whoever you want to the Year 12 farewell." In the same month, Pope Francis announced that priests would be allowed to bless same-sex couples, a move that appeared to depart radically from the Church's erstwhile denial of its core sacraments to LGBT+ communicants if they were not celibate, and longstanding refusal to bless same-sex unions. Francis's affirmative policy has been upheld by his successor, Pope Leo XIV.

Despite these advances, in March 2024, Equality Australia published a scathing 155-page report 'Dismissed, Denied and Demeaned: A national report on LGBTQ+ discrimination in faith-based schools and organisations' in which it claimed anti-LGBT discrimination was still rife in faith institutions:

Through 26 personal stories and an extensive investigation of publicly available records and financial information, this report reveals the impact and true extent of LGBTQ+ discrimination in religious educational institutions and faith-based service providers in Australia.

== Legacy ==
In 1998, GaLTaS was absorbed into the New South Wales Teachers Federation as a Special Interest Group, with Derek Williams as a founding member. The SchoolWatch Committee established by Williams continued in its intended ministerial advisory role for the next five years, with Jacqui Griffin eventually assuming the role of Secretary. From 2010 to 2017, the Safe Schools Coalition Australia ran the Safe Schools Program to give support to teachers and schools seeking assistance in the creation of a more inclusive environment for LGBT+ students and their families.

After entering the legal profession full-time, Griffin continued her LGBT+ rights activism through her involvement in her native Northern Territory with the Rainbow Territory group, who made submissions in relation to federal religious freedom legislation as well as the Territory's own State anti-discrimination laws in relation to religious schools. The most comprehensive outcome for both staff and for students after lobbying by the group was the 2023 repeal of religious exemptions, passed while she was present in the House. Her children's book The Adventures of Scales and Sarah about the friendship between a young girl and a chromosomally gender-flipping bearded dragon lizard in a context of climate change was self-published in 2023.

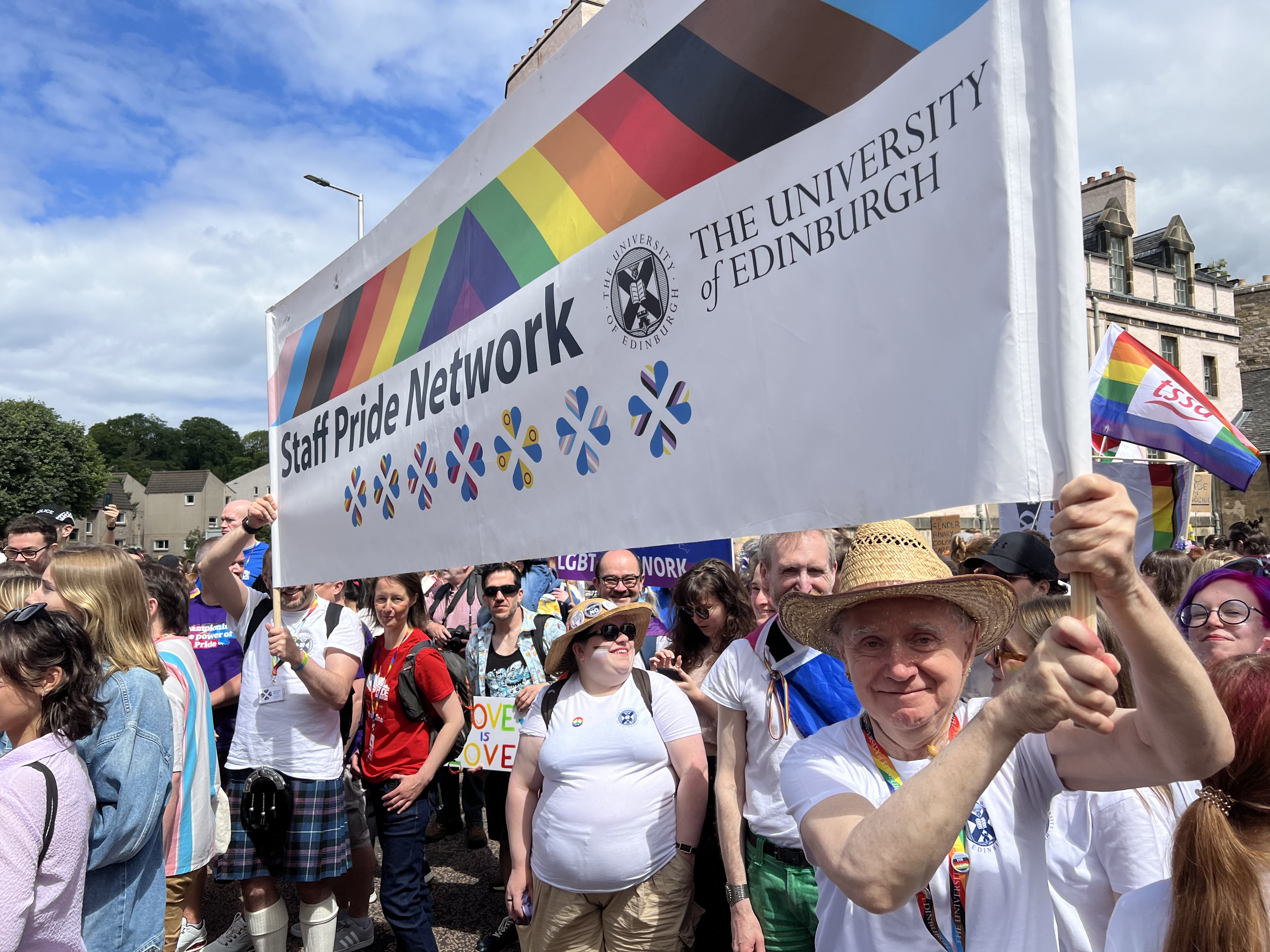
Williams (R) holding banner.

Edinburgh University Staff Pride Network, Pride Edinburgh 2024

In 2006, Williams moved to his ancestral Scotland where he remains active in LGBT+ politics, and in 2018 he was co-opted to the Committee as Meetings Secretary of the Edinburgh University Staff Pride Network, on which he is currently serving his 8th term as Committee member. On 3 March 2023, his former employer, Randwick Boys High School, celebrated World Pride Day as a whole-school event.

Prior to the activism of GaLTaS in bringing the existence of LGBT+ youth and their victimisation to inescapable public awareness, the NSW Dept of Education policy had been that "The Department of School Education does not condone or promote homosexuality", along similar lines to the British Section 28, which reflected the prevailing view at that time. Virginia Chadwick's heartfelt recognition of the problems facing LGBT+ children in her schools and her willingness to address them with new anti-discrimination and anti-bullying policies, reflected an opening up of dialogue with parents of these children, and their teachers. Moreover, the Keating government's funding of the GaLTaS youth hotline that preceded Griffin's SchoolWatch Report followed by the report's public launch and adoption by Chadwick credibly placed on public record LGBT+ students' experience of bullying and its direct correlation with homicide by students, depression and suicide ideation. Crucial to GaLTaS' advocacy for safe schools was its dialogue with parents. In its February 2000 edition of Parent & Citizen Journal, the P&C published an article by Griffin (Secretary of the SchoolWatch Committee), Teaching Against Homophobia, which stated:

Homophobic harassment, though, begins at primary school and is intrinsically connected to gender. Homophobia originates from, and serves to reinforce, dominant constructions of appropriate masculine and feminine behaviours.

By 2017, the New South Wales Education Department had promulgated its Review of Sexuality and Gender Education, setting out guidelines for age-appropriate sex education curricula, following the 2011 expansion of its anti-bullying policy. In 2022, the New South Wales government published its LGBTIQ+ Health Strategy 2022-2027 paper, which along with the conclusive 61% 'Yes' vote in the 2017 Australian Marriage Law Postal Survey, further underlined the magnitude of the shift that had taken place in public understanding of LGBT+ identity away from its criminalisation prior to 1984.

=== Institutional implementation and long-term obstacles ===
While the publication and ministerial launch of the SchoolWatch Report marked a historic turning point for community-led educational advocacy, subsequent independent evaluations revealed that the implementation of systemic anti-homophobia policies within New South Wales state and systemic Catholic schools faced significant, long-term institutional friction. Sociological and historical reviews published by institutions such as the Australian National University (ANU) have noted that early administrative momentum was frequently sustained by individual, frontline educators and community organizations rather than consistent departmental will, resulting in highly uneven compliance across different regional school districts. Furthermore, the structural frameworks built by grassroots initiatives like GaLTaS proved vulnerable to changing political tides in subsequent decades. Legislative committee reviews tracking anti-bias initiatives established that multi-agency protection programs such as Safe Schools Coalition Australia that were developed in the wake of the 1990s crises were periodically defunded, deprioritized, or dismantled during successive state and federal policy shifts, demonstrating that the institutional progress achieved was neither seamless nor permanently secured.
