= Virginia Chadwick =

Australian politician

The Honourable Virginia Chadwick AO

President of the New South Wales Legislative Council
- In office 29 June 1998 – 5 March 1999
- Preceded by: Max Willis
- Succeeded by: Meredith Burgmann

Minister for Education and Youth Affairs
- In office 3 July 1992 – 4 April 1995
- Premier: John Fahey
- Preceded by: Herself (as Minister for School Education and Youth Affairs)
- Succeeded by: John Aquilina (as Minister for Education and Training and Minister Assisting the Premier on Youth Affairs)

Minister for Training Minister for Tourism Minister Assisting the Premier
- In office 26 May 1993 – 4 April 1995
- Premier: John Fahey
- Preceded by: Herself (as Minister for Employment and Training); Bruce Baird (as Minister for Tourism)
- Succeeded by: John Aquilina (as Minister for Education and Training); Brian Langton (as Minister for Tourism)

Minister for Employment and Training
- In office 3 July 1992 – 26 May 1993
- Premier: John Fahey
- Preceded by: John Fahey (as Minister for Further Education, Training and Employment)
- Succeeded by: Herself (as Minister for Training and Tourism); Kerry Chikarovski (as Minister for Industrial Relations and Employment)

Minister for School Education and Youth Affairs
- In office 24 July 1990 – 3 July 1992
- Premier: Nick Greiner; John Fahey
- Preceded by: Terry Metherell (as Minister for Education and Youth Affairs)
- Succeeded by: Herself (as Minister for Education and Youth Affairs)

Minister for Family and Community Services
- In office 25 March 1988 – 24 July 1990
- Premier: Nick Greiner
- Preceded by: John Aquilina (as Minister for Youth and Community Services)
- Succeeded by: Robert Webster

Member of New South Wales Legislative Council
- In office 6 November 1978 – 5 March 1999

Personal details
- Born: 19 December 1944 Newcastle, New South Wales
- Died: 17 September 2009 (aged 64) Toronto, New South Wales
- Resting place: Newcastle Memorial Park, Beresfield, New South Wales
- Party: Liberal Party
- Spouse: Bruce Sheldon

Virginia Anne Chadwick AO (19 December 1944 – 17 September 2009) was an Australian politician. She was a Liberal Member of the New South Wales Legislative Council from 1978 to 1999. She was the first NSW female Minister for Education; the first female President of the New South Wales Legislative Council; and Chair and CEO of the Great Barrier Reef Marine Park Authority.

== Early life ==
She was born in Newcastle and educated at the Newcastle Girls High School from 1967 until 1968, then at Dormers Wells, Southall, UK 1969–70. She achieved her B.A., Dip.Ed. at the University of Newcastle. She taught History in the Adult Matriculation program at the Newcastle Technical College 1971–73.

== Political career ==
Chadwick joined the Newcastle Young Liberals in 1960 and subsequently Liberal Party, Newcastle Branch. She served as a Member of the Liberal Party State Executive before being elected to the NSW Legislative Council in 1978. She served as Opposition Whip and a member of the Opposition front bench before becoming the first female NSW Liberal Minister when the Greiner Government swept into power in 1988.

=== Ministerial career ===
Chadwick was a minister of the Greiner-Fahey era, initially serving as Minister for Family and Community Services, Minister for the Hunter and Minister for Women (25 March 1988 – 20 July 1990). Following the resignation of Education Minister Terry Metherell, Chadwick was appointed the state's first female Minister for Education (20 July 1990 – 4 April 1995), and was later given additional responsibility as Minister for Tourism (26 May 1993 – 4 April 1995).

Chadwick's appointment to the Education portfolio followed Minister Terry Metherell who reduced head office staffing, introduced Basic Skills testing and increased class sizes to pay for Special Education initiatives. Metherell's style quickly escalated to war with the Teachers Union, the Parents and Citizens Federation and even his own department. The strikes and protest rallies held during this unrest were amongst the largest in NSW history. As the new Minister, Chadwick's first task was to broker peace between the Government and the Education lobby, especially teachers. The first breakthrough came with a settlement to the long-running teachers pay dispute.

During her time in Education, Chadwick drew on her consultative skills to implement extensive reforms initiated by her predecessor. (These reforms are known as "School Centred Education" (Scott Reports) and in Curriculum, the 'Carrick' and 'Excellence and Equity' Reports.) The NSW Board of Studies was established, key learning areas developed and implemented in curriculum and schools; budgeting and some staffing responsibilities were devolved to school principals; more than a thousand local school councils were established. Selective schools, "centres of excellence" and specialist schools such as Westfields Sports High School were funded to create choice in public education in Sydney's West as well as regional and rural areas of the state.

A Greiner loyalist, Chadwick was concerned during the 1992 Independent Commission Against Corruption investigation of the Metherell Affair, when Greiner was forced to resign. Although a Member of the Upper House, Chadwick was viewed by many as an obvious successor to Greiner; but when approached to take the leadership, she declined.

If Chadwick had become Premier whilst still a member of the Legislative Council it would not have been without precedence as Barrie Unsworth was a member of the Upper House when he became Premier in 1986 before resigning from the Upper House to successfully transfer to the Lower House.

Following the murder convictions and 18-year prison sentences handed down in 1990 to 8 students (the “Alexandria Eight”) from Sydney's Cleveland Street High School and a North Shore Catholic school for the gay related killing of 33-year-old New Zealander Richard Johnson, Chadwick became the first education minister to directly address the issue of homophobic bullying and violence in New South Wales schools. Amid a wave of gay gang murders in which as many as 88 gay men were killed by youths, gay Social Science teacher Wayne Tonks was also brutally murdered by two 16-year-old students from Cleveland Street High School after he had received threats at the school and had his Artarmon flat ransacked. Another group of 30 youths aged 12–18 (the "Bondi Boys") were active in throwing gay men to their deaths off the cliffs of Marks Park, Tamarama (euphemised as "cliff jumping").

As a result, the Gay and Lesbian Teachers and Students Association (GaLTaS) was formed in 1991 by gay high school teacher Derek Williams and lesbian student Jennifer Glass to tackle ongoing issues of homophobic school bullying, suicidal ideation, suicide among gay youth and homicide by students, via workshops, teacher training and books in schools programmes.

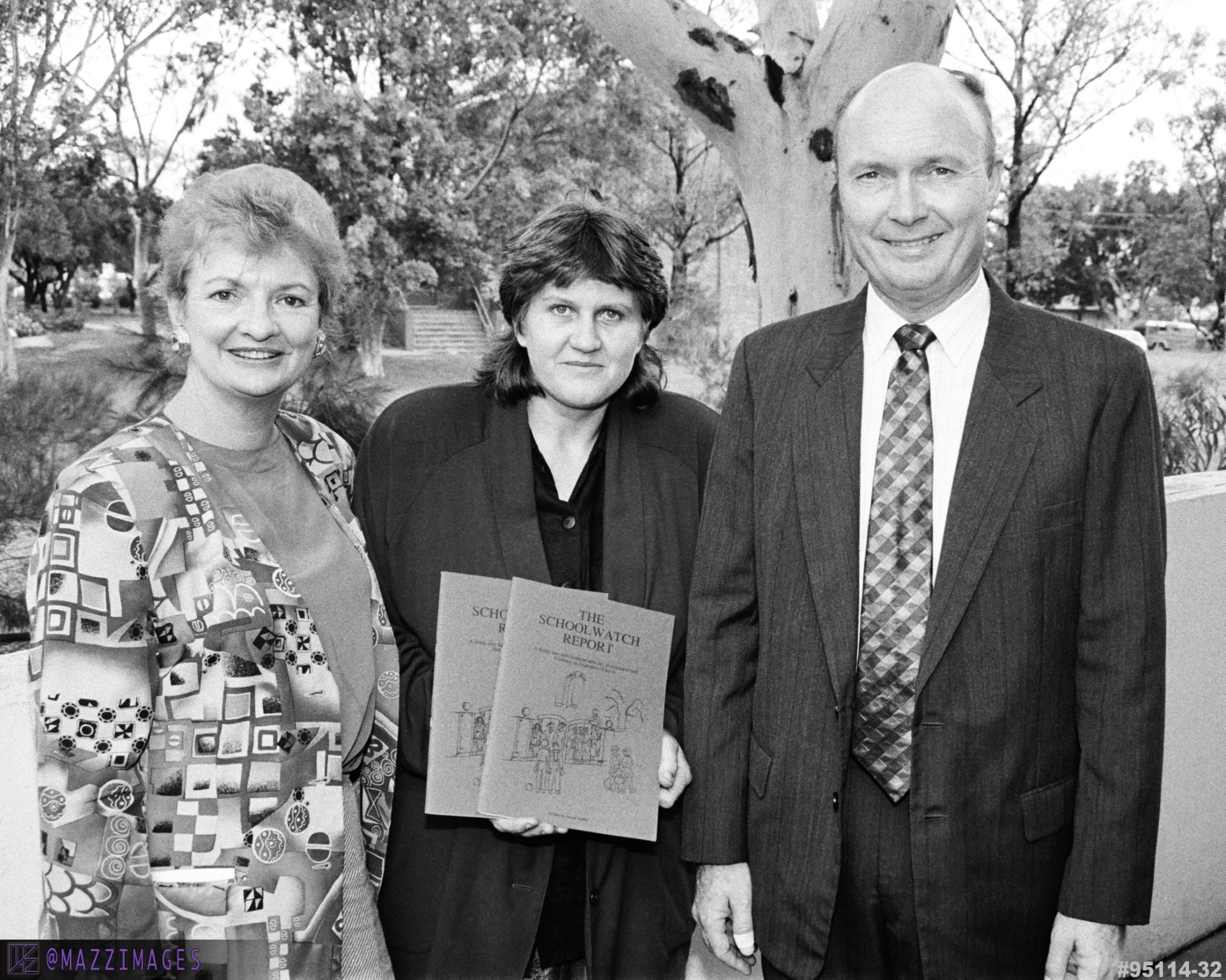
Chadwick (left) at her launch for GaLTaS of Jacqui Griffin's (centre) SchoolWatch Report at Randwick Boys High School whose Principal Geoff McNeill (right) issued the invitation. First published in Sydney Star Observer. (Photo: Mazz Images)

After learning of reports of homophobic bullying and violence at NSW schools, Chadwick met Williams and lobbyist Carole Ruthchild with some of the affected GaLTaS students at the New South Wales Parliament. In November 1993, she announced draft guidelines for School Anti-discrimination Grievance Procedures for Students, to enable LGBT+ students in New South Wales to achieve legal redress under the NSW Anti-Discrimination Act and to complete their education. The guidelines were eventually promulgated in 1996. In consultation with NSW Parents and Citizens, the New South Wales Teachers Federation, the Board of Studies, the NSW Anti-Discrimination Board and GaLTaS, Chadwick approved departmental anti-homophobia videos and issued a vetted reading list for school libraries. These measures were also intended to reverse the escalation of homophobic student invective into serious crime such as assault and homicide, that had life-changing consequences also for children who were perpetrators.

After GaLTaS was awarded a Federal National Youth Grant of $30,000 (=c.$72,947.57 equivalent in 2026) by the Federal Department of Employment, Education and Training to establish a toll-free hotline for victimised gay and lesbian students, the research obtained was compiled by GaLTaS co-convener Ms Jacqui Griffin while she wrote The SchoolWatch Report. The report was officially launched by Chadwick in March 1995 at Randwick Boys High School where Derek Williams taught. Following her launch of The SchoolWatch Report, Chadwick continued her reforms of departmental policy on gay related education issues until the defeat of the Liberal government at the 1995 New South Wales state election.

=== President of the Legislative Council ===
In 1998, Chadwick again made history as the Parliament of New South Wales's first woman Presiding Officer with her election as President of the Legislative Council. Her victory in the ballot for the Presidency was a surprise. The Labor Government's nominee for the position was Hon Helen Sham-Ho who had suddenly defected from the Liberal Party days before the ballot. The Government Leader in the Legislative Council, Michael Egan (Australian politician) mistakenly believed that one of the Government members who was absent from the House on leave for an exam would be paired. (Pairs are a courtesy arrangement in Parliament whereby an Opposition Member would have abstained from the vote when a Government member is absent, or vice versa). The Clerk of the Parliaments advised midway through the ballot that pairs did not apply for secret ballots. The Government tried to call off the vote but was advised that this was not possible after ballot papers for the secret ballot had been issued. Chadwick defeated Sham Ho by 21–19. She held this position from 29 June 1998 to 5 March 1999, when she retired from politics. Chadwick holds the record for the shortest presidency of the Legislative Council, being in office for 250 days.

== Great Barrier Reef Marine Park Authority ==
Soon after her retirement from State politics, Federal Environment Minister Robert Hill appointed Chadwick as Chairperson and CEO of the Great Barrier Reef Marine Park Authority (GBRMPA). She moved to Townsville with husband Bruce Chadwick and served in this role until her retirement in July 2007. Chadwick led the difficult negotiations with fishermen, farmers, tourist operators, local, state and federal Governments to achieve an increase in highly protected areas on the reef from 4.5 per cent to 33 per cent. This was recognised in 2004 when the Authority was presented a prestigious Banksia Award by the Banksia Environmental Foundation. In the same year she was awarded the international Fred M. Packard Award in 2004, jointly with Imogen Zethoven of WWF Australia, for their work "furthering the conservation objectives of protected areas" to the Australian community.

Following a potential crisis involving an oil tanker attempting to navigate through the Reef, Chadwick was appointed to a safety inquiry and so impressed the stakeholders she was then appointed to the Australian Maritime Safety Authority (AMSA) Advisory Committee. She subsequently led an Australian delegation to the United Nations on International Law of the Sea.

== Personal life ==
In the 2005 Queen's Birthday Honours Chadwick was appointed an Officer of the Order of Australia. The citation was "For service to conservation and the environment through management of the environmental, heritage and economic sustainability issues affecting the Great Barrier Reef, and to the New South Wales Parliament, particularly in the areas of child welfare and education."

Chadwick and her husband Bruce retired and returned to their Novocastrian roots, living at Lake Macquarie. The couple had two children, Amanda and David, and three surviving grandchildren.

She died from cancer on 17 September 2009, aged 64, at Toronto.

== Virginia Chadwick Memorial Foundation ==
Following her death, the Virginia Chadwick Memorial Foundation was established and operated from 2010 to 2020 to carry on Virginia Chadwick's work and build on her achievements especially in regard to the Great Barrier Reef and through environmental activities, including environmental education, environmental partnerships, Indigenous engagement, networking and knowledge sharing around the world

The Foundation was Chaired by Fay Barker who succeeded Mrs Chadwick as CEO of GBRMA and membership included Hon Catherine Cusack MLC. Ms Barker described Mrs Chadwick’s achievements in a message to the NSW Parliament on 11 May 2022 when a marble bust of Mrs Chadwick was unveiled in the Legislative Council Chamber. The unveiling of the marble bust of Mrs Chadwick was the first time in 107 years a new bust had been added to the historic NSW Legislative Council Chamber. A motion acknowledging the significance of the event and Mrs Chadwick’s achievements was moved by Catherine Cusack MLC and replied to by Penny Sharpe MLC.

New South Wales Legislative Council
| Preceded by Max Willis | President of the New South Wales Legislative Council; 1998–1999 | Succeeded by Meredith Burgmann |
Political offices
| Preceded by John Aquilina | Minister for Family and Community Services; 1988–1990 | Succeeded by Robert Webster |
| Preceded by Terry Metherell | Minister for Education and Youth Affairs; 1990–1995 | Succeeded by John Aquilina |
