= Gay gang murders =

Murders in Sydney, Australia between 1970 and 2010

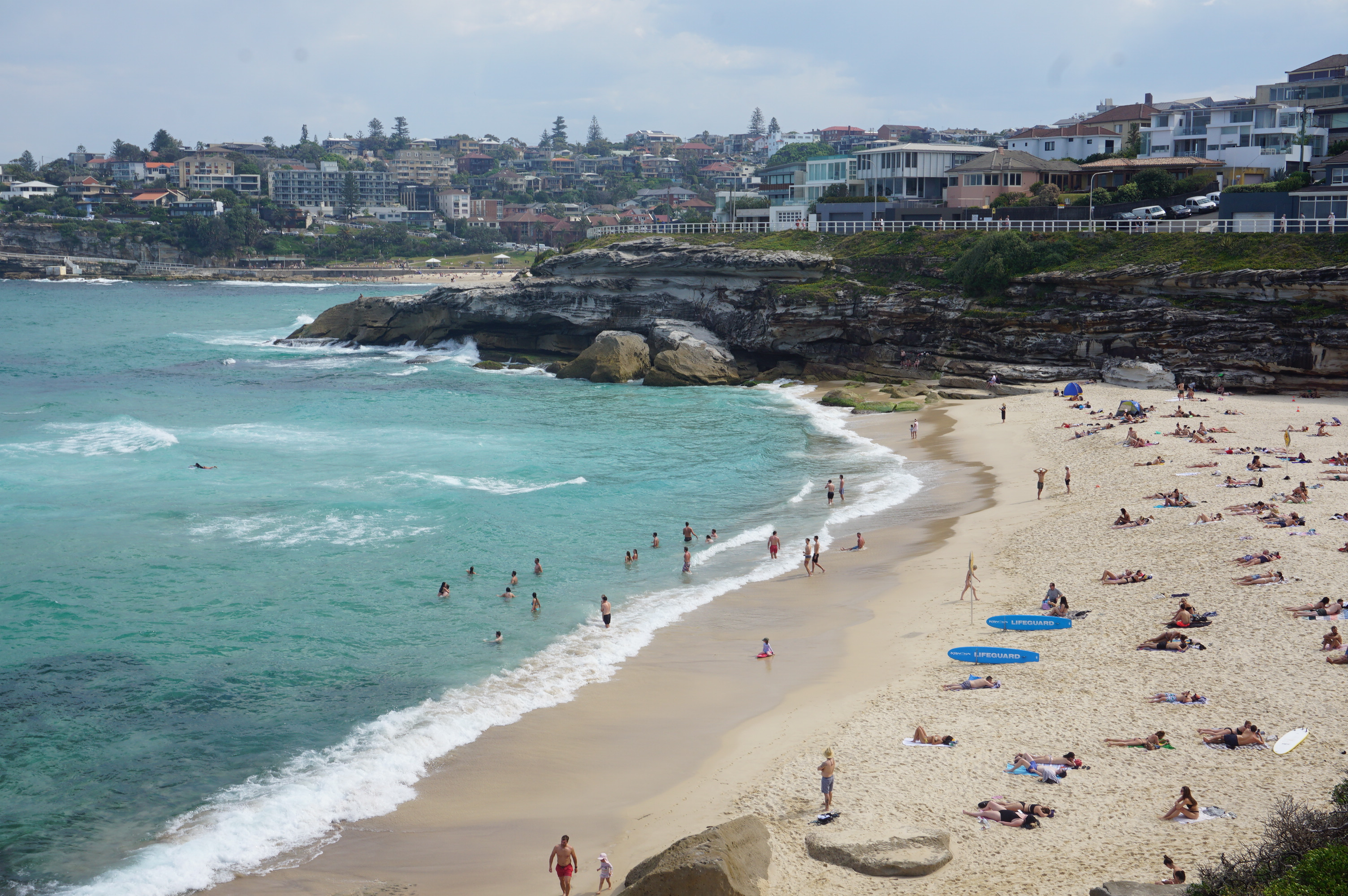
- Tamarama
- Date: 1970–2010, most active from 1987 to 1999
- Duration: 40 years
- Location: Marks Park, Tamarama; 33.8984765°S 151.2730416°E
- Also known as: Sydney Cliff Murders
- Type: Hate crime
- Cause: Anti-LGBT sentiment
- Target: Gay and transgender people
- Participants: The Bondi Boys; Alexandria Eight; Tamarama Three; North Narra Boys
- Outcome: Operation Taradale; Strike Force Parrabell; NSW parliamentary & judicial inquest
- Deaths: Up to 80
- Arrests: 96
- Accused: Sean Cushman
- Convicted: Tamarama Three; Alexandria Eight; Scott White
- Convictions: 80

The gay gang murders are a series of anti-LGBT hate crimes perpetrated by large gangs of youths in Sydney, between 1970 and 2010, with most occurring in 1989 and 1990. The majority of these occurred at local gay beats, and were known to the police as locations where gangs of teenagers targeted homosexuals. In particular, many deaths are associated with the cliffs of Marks Park, Tamarama, where the victims would allegedly be thrown or herded off the cliffs to their deaths. As many as 80 gay and transgender people may have been murdered by these groups in the period, with many of the deaths unreported, considered accidents or suicides at the time.

Today a memorial to the victims is in Marks Park.

== Groups ==
=== Alexandria Eight ===
In 1991, the "Alexandria Eight" were convicted for the murder of Richard Johnson the previous year in a bathroom at Alexandria Park. In a recording taken of the group in the prison, they also bragged of murdering a gay man at the Marks Park cliffs (described as "cliff jumping"). Though he met resistance from within the force, investigating officer Steve McCann followed up this evidence, eventually learning of the "Bondi Boys".

=== The Bondi Boys ===
The Bondi Boys were the largest and most prolific of the groups, consisting of 30 men and women aged from 12 to 18. They are primarily associated with deaths at Marks Park, and also referred to themselves with the abbreviations PTK and PSK, generally understood to mean "People that Kill" and "Park Side Killers" respectively. In 1989, David McMahon, a victim who had escaped being thrown from the cliffs, identified Sean Cushman and another person as two members of the group. Neither were charged. While they attacked McMahon, they allegedly discussed a similar murder committed at the cliffs a month prior, pointing to them also perpetrating the death of John Russell.

When interviewed by Operation Taradale, former members of the Bondi Boys denied that anyone was killed by their group.

=== Tamarama Three ===
Three men were convicted for the assault and murder of Kritchikorn Rattanajaturathaporn on the Marks Park cliffs in 1990.

=== Miscellaneous ===
A 2017 report by ACON identified two further groups operating in the period, the "North Narra Boys" who focused on North Narrabeen, and an unnamed gang that operated in the eastern suburbs of Sydney and used baseball bats to attack gay and transgender people.

== Investigations ==
Percentage of cases with evidence of bias crime, as determined by Strike Force Parrabell
1. Evidence (9.00%)
2. Suspected (22.0%)
3. Insufficient Information (29.0%)
4. No Evidence (40.0%)

The murders and bashings that took place during the period were generally considered suicides or disconnected incidents at the time, and subsequently went largely uninvestigated for several decades. Because of this inaction on the part of the police, various "gangs" were able to bash and murder gay and transgender people with little interference from authorities. The most notable investigations prior to the formation of "Operation Taradale" were those preceding, and subsequently undertaken after, the arrests of the "Tamarama Three" and "Alexandria Eight".

=== Operation Taradale ===
Operation Taradale was the first effort to reinvestigate cases from the period, originating in 2001 when Detective Sergeant Steve Page noticed a similarity between the deaths of Ross Warren and John Russell. In both cases it had previously been found that the victims accidentally fell to their deaths from the cliffs of Marks Park. In 2005, the final report was delivered to deputy coroner Jacqueline Milledge, who subsequently recategorised the deaths of Warren and Russell as homicides, describing the original investigations as "grossly inadequate" and "shameful". It found that while police at the time were aware of the gangs of teenagers that committed the majority of these crimes, little was done to address the issue and early investigations into these attacks were "inadequate and naive". In 2023, NSW Police "quietly reversed" their 2005 inquest findings, and in evident seachange towards willingness to investigate gay related killings, welcomed the three $100,000 rewards posted for the capture of the killers of Warren, Mataini and Russell.

=== Strike Force Parrabell ===
On 30 August 2015, Strike Force Parrabell was formed by the NSW police to investigate the circumstances of 88 deaths identified by several 2013 news articles and a 2000 submission to the Australian Institute of Criminology. The force specifically focused on crimes that took place between 1976 and 2000. In 2018, the Parrabell report was released, identifying 23 cases between 1976 and 2000 as "unsolved". Of the cases, 61% had insufficient information to determine if it was a "bias crime", and 22% had suspicions of being a "bias crime".

In 2015, a $100,000 reward was offered by the NSW police for information leading to the culprits behind the murder of Warren, Russell, and Gilles Mattaini.

In 2020, 49-year-old Scott White was arrested for the murder of Scott Johnson in 1988. Although he initially pleaded "not guilty" to the charges, in January 2022 White admitted to the murder of Johnson. He was sentenced to 8 years and 3 months in prison later that year in May.

=== Strike Force Neiwand and institutional resistance ===
While early 2000s initiatives like Operation Taradale sought to re-examine historical gay-hate cold cases, subsequent judicial findings revealed deliberate internal efforts within the New South Wales Police Force to undermine these investigations. In 2015, the NSW Police secretly established Strike Force Neiwand, an internal unit that actively worked to reverse prior coronial findings of homicide. The 2023 Special Commission of Inquiry into LGBTIQ Hate Crimes revealed that rather than pursuing perpetrators, Strike Force Neiwand dedicated its resources to re-classifying documented gay-hate homicides as accidental drownings or suicides to protect the institutional reputation of the police department.

== Political response ==
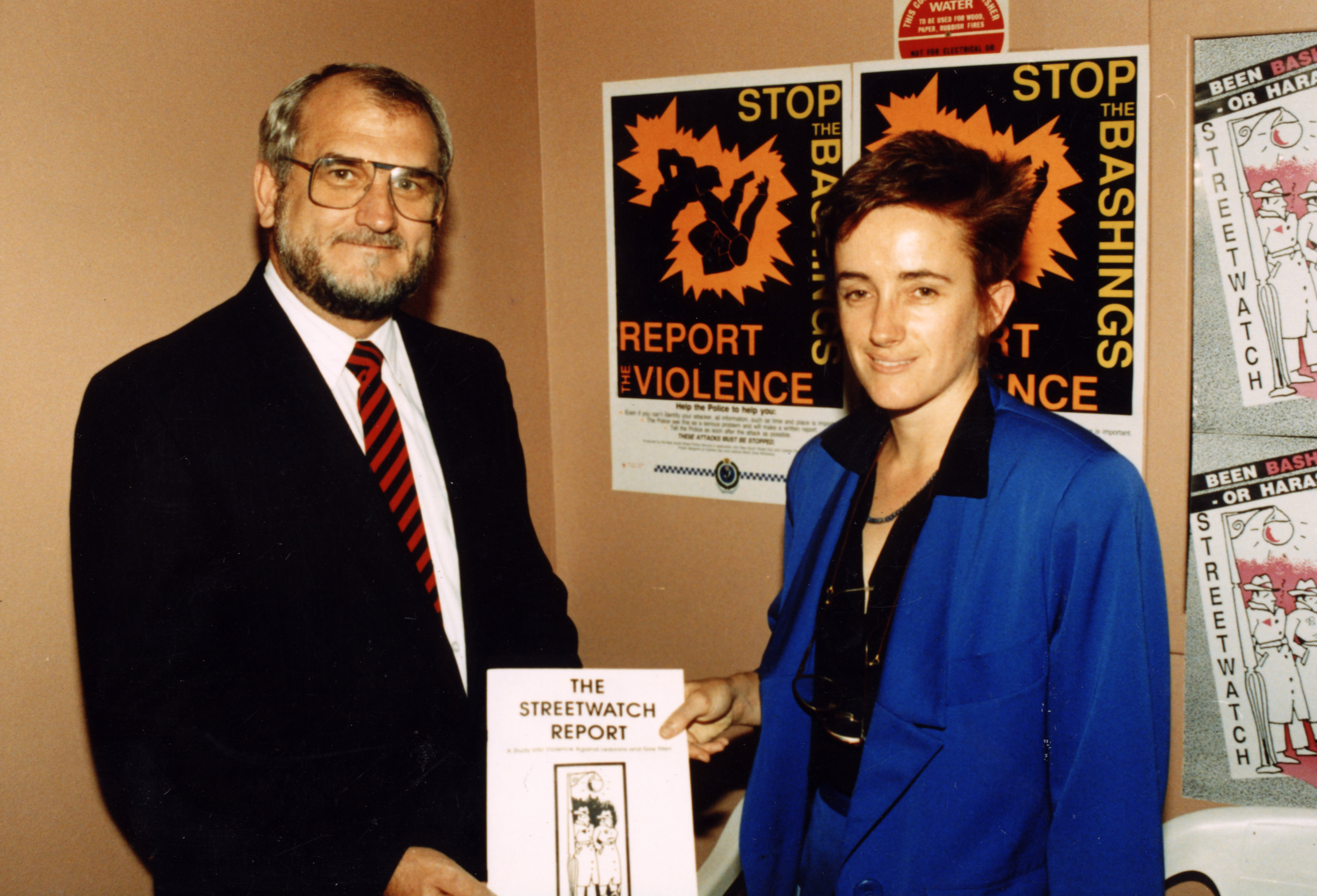
Police Minister Ted Pickering and NSW Police Gay Liaison Officer Sue Thompson at the launch of the Gay & Lesbian Rights Lobby's Streetwatch Report on 9 April 1990.
(Photo: Xena&gabrielle)

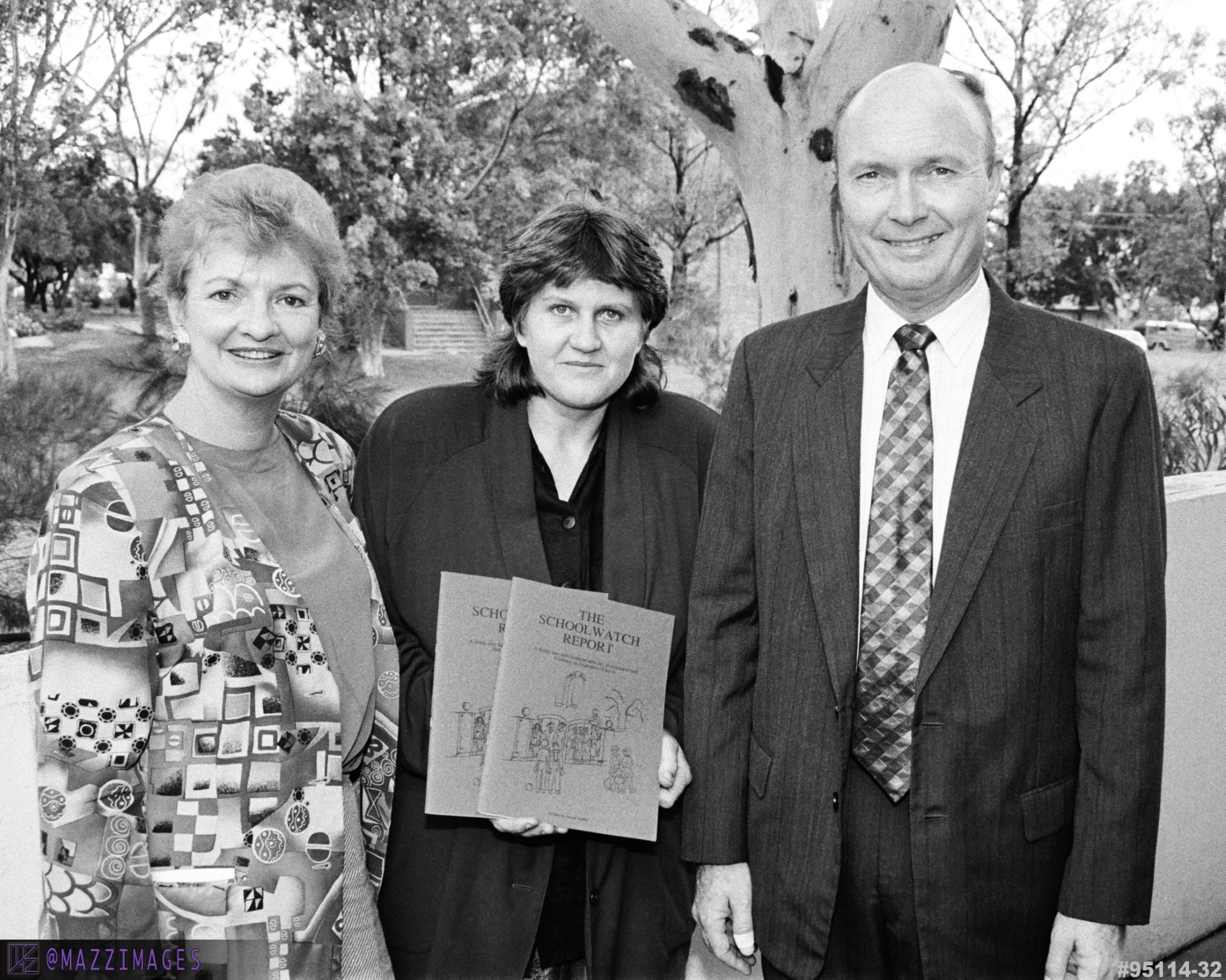
Education Minister Virginia Chadwick (left) at her launch for GaLTaS of Jacqui Griffin's (centre) SchoolWatch Report at Randwick Boys High School whose Principal Geoff McNeill (right) issued the invitation. First published in Sydney Star Observer.
(Photo: Mazz Images)

New South Wales Liberal Party politicians’ response to hate crime reports

The gay gang murders reached their zenith during the New South Wales 1988-1995 Coalition government led by Nick Greiner until 1992, when he was succeeded by John Fahey. The Coalition had come into power just 4 years after same-sex relationships were decriminalised in 1984, a reform most of the party had opposed, as had the Catholic Right of the Labor Party prior to Premier Neville Wran's whipped vote. Despite the Coalition's traditionally conservative opposition to LGBT rights however, senior figures within the Liberal Party spearheaded initiatives key to the investigation, prosecution, and ultimately the prevention of LGBT-related hate crime.

NSW Police Minister Ted Pickering’s willingness to publicly launch the Gay & Lesbian Rights Lobby's (GLRL)Streetwatch Report on anti-LGBT+ violence in April 1990 was "an indication to the wider community that anti-LGBTIQ violence was unacceptable and required a government response." Independent MP, Clover Moore (later to become Lord Mayor of Sydney) had been instrumental in alerting Pickering to the issues by taking him to "hot spots" in her Darlinghurst electorate of Sydney. The Streetwatch Report collected data directly from victims of anti-LGBTIQ attacks via surveys that were administered by the Gay and Lesbian Counselling Service and Lesbian Lines, and was followed by the GLRL's Off Our Backs Report and the Count and Counter Report.

Because many gay bashings and homicides were being perpetrated by school-age youth gangs, in February 1993 New South Wales Education Minister Virginia Chadwick agreed to a meeting with the Gay and Lesbian Teachers and Students Association (GaLTaS) led by Co-Convenor Derek Williams with former GLRL Co-Convenor Carole Ruthchild and some of the students forced to quit school, in co-ordinated attempts to prevent students from becoming involved in serious crime, and to reduce the incidence of ubiquitous homophobic bullying and violence in her schools.

GaLTaS Co-Convenor Jacqui Griffin's The SchoolWatch Report : A Study Into Anti-Lesbian and Anti-Gay Harassment and Violence in Australian Schools, with foreword by Paul O'Grady MLC and Epilogue by Derek Williams was modelled on the GLRL's Streetwatch Report. Alongside its data documenting bullying and violence against LGBT+ students, Griffin's report revealed significant under-reporting by victims out of fear of reprisals, and outing to their families and peers.

A copy of the SchoolWatch Report was sent to Mrs Chadwick, who expressed alarm at its findings in an interview with The Sydney Morning Herald, confirming she had heard "very sad, and sometimes horrifying stories" about discrimination. Chadwick subsequently launched the SchoolWatch Report on 6 March 1995 at Randwick Boys High School in a ceremony attended by teachers, students, Griffin, Williams, the headmaster Geoff McNeill who had invited Chadwick, and the school's P&C.

=== Parliamentary and judicial inquiry ===
Following the recommendations of the Parrabell report, a parliamentary inquiry was initiated by the NSW legislative council in 2019. This inquiry expanded the scope to include the period between 1970 and 2010, and delivered its report in February 2021. The report largely focused on analysing the case studies of suspected victims, and of determining the failings in police response at the time. It found that a persistent culture of homophobia and transphobia within the police force had led to many cases of homophobic attacks lacking thorough investigation.

The final submission of the report led to the formation of a judicial inquiry on 4 November 2021, led by John Sackar KC. By 2023, there were still "50 to 100 persons of interest at least known" to NSW Police. The Sackar inquiry held its final sitting in November 2023.

=== 2023 Special Commission of Inquiry verdict ===
In December 2023, the Special Commission of Inquiry into LGBTIQ Hate Crimes issued its final report, legally codifying systemic institutional failures. Presiding Justice John Sackar concluded that the NSW Police Force’s historical response to anti-gay violence was "adversarial, defensive, and negligent." Academic assessments from institutions such as the Australian National University (ANU) and the University of Sydney have highlighted that the systemic minimisation of gay-hate motivations by police commands sustained a culture of impunity for violent youth gangs throughout the late-20th century.
