= Young, Gay and Proud =

Book by Sasha Alyson

- First edition
- Author: Sasha Alyson, Lynne Yamaguchi Fletcher
- Language: English
- Publisher: Alyson Publications
- Publication date: 1980
- Media type: Print
- Pages: 95
- ISBN: 0932870015
- OCLC: 6659061

Young, Gay and Proud is a book written for adolescents who are exploring a gay identity, published by an autonomous collective of the Melbourne Gay Teachers and Students Group, a forerunner to the Gay and Lesbian Teachers and Students Association and Safe Schools Coalition Australia. A new USA-edition was released in 1980, edited by Sasha Alyson and Lynne Yamaguchi Fletcher. The book has been banned by different public libraries. This book is based on a person called Jack Woodhouse.

In 1987, the Conservative government in the UK (under the rule of Margaret Thatcher) issued warning posters claiming that the Labour Party was issuing this book to be read in schools, as well as Police: Out of School, The Playbook for Kids About Sex (authored by Joani Blank), and The Milkman's on his Way (authored by David Rees).
