= Under-reporting =

Data reporting failure

Under-reporting usually refers to some issue, incident, statistic, etc., that individuals, responsible agencies, or news media have not reported, or have reported as less than the actual level or amount. Under-reporting of crimes, for example, makes it hard to figure the actual incidence of crimes.

Under-reporting is a failure in data reporting.

== Crime ==
=== Sexual violence ===
Various estimates have been provided in relation to under-reporting of crimes across the world. According to the American Medical Association (1995), sexual violence, and rape in particular, is considered the most under-reported violent crime. Common reasons for individuals not reporting crime include fear of not being believed, insecurity, and fear of getting into trouble. These reasons are most common for not reporting rape. It is commonly assumed that most of the rape cases go unreported; some estimates go up to or above 90%. (See also Rape reporting.) Non-recognition of domestic violence may lead to under-reporting.

=== Anti-LGBT+ crime ===
Under-reporting of violence against LGBT people including homicide is widespread, and is more likely to arise in countries that criminalise same-sex relationships, especially regimes that impose the death penalty for them. Even under democratic rule of law governance where there are LGBT rights protections, under-reporting occurs. A US investigation by the Center for Public Integrity in collaboration with ProPublica and News21 found that violent attacks and other hate crimes against lesbian, gay, bisexual and transgender Americans "are consistently not reported and prosecuted because of chronic distrust between the LGBTQ community and police":

Nearly 300,000 crimes may have been committed against people across the United States because of their sexual orientation from 2012 to 2016, according to a News21 analysis of data from the federal National Crime Victimization Survey, which tens of thousands of American households fill out each year.

In Australia, the New South Wales Legislative Council Standing Committee on Social Issues A Report into Youth Violence in New South Wales, published September 1995 noted significant under-reporting of LGBT bullying by victims out of fear of reprisals, and outing to their families and peers, that had led the Department of Education to underestimate its prevalence:

It is of concern that of 37 students reporting incidents of verbal or physical harassment, 31 had not reported the most serious incidents to school authorities. (Submission 43). In two submissions to the Committee from school students, little sympathy was expressed for victims of this form of violence (Submissions 20 and 58). It was suggested to the Committee that 46% of young people involved in an anti-homophobia workshop in one school were not aware that it was illegal to bash homosexuals. A group of ten students, charged with the murder of a Sydney man at a park near their High School, expressed genuine surprise upon their arrest (in camera evidence). The Committee also heard that school personnel have demonstrated homophobic attitudes.

=== Child abuse ===
According to the National Children's Alliance, over 600,000 children in the US were victims of abuse and neglect in 2021, the most recent year for which there was national data, with the actual number likely under-reported because of the ongoing COVID-19 pandemic in that year. An estimated 1.8 million children received prevention services. Lack of mandatory reporting of child abuse in certain countries has contributed to under-reporting. In 2024, 27 EU countries did not have mandatory reporting, while child abuse that has occurred in religious institutions such as in the Catholic Church has been under-reported through concealment by church authorities. This practice also happens in The Church of Jesus Christ of Latter-day Saints and other like institutions. Children themselves may feel unable to report abuse because of fear of revenge by their abuser, or embarrassment, humiliation, or thinking they would not be believed. Moreover, a child may be too young to have the words to explain what is happening to them. If the abuser has introduced the child to drugs or pornography, the child may fear getting into trouble. Fear and guilt thus play a role in making the child think they have done something wrong. An abuser may also manifest overt generosity to their victim by showering them with gifts and affection, so the child may irrationally come to love their abuser and not want to report them.

=== Fraud ===
In 2012, the universities of Leicester and Westminster, while collaborating with Serious Organised Crime Agency, estimated that 200,000 people had been victims of online dating fraud. The report included instances of under-reported frauds.

=== Murder ===
Murders are sometimes not reported, due to the fear of the alleged murderer's connection with another murderer, or because of a settlement. Forced suicide has led to honour killings going unreported. The reported murder rates in China have been criticized for under-reporting unsolved murders due to police salaries being based on the rate of solved cases.

=== Car accidents ===
A 2023 estimate by the National Highway Traffic Safety Administration found that 31.9% of injury crashes and 59.7% of property-damage crashes were not reported to police.

== Medicine ==
Under-reported dengue fever in India, polio in Pakistan, disability in Malaysia, and COVID-19 in many countries remain a problem. In the United States, it was estimated in 1989 that 40% of the AIDS cases in South Carolina went unreported, largely due to social stigma in the early days of the epidemic. In 2008, out of 2,460 deaths from AIDS-related illnesses during a six-year period in Washington, DC, an estimated 1,337 had not been reported. On the basis of national surveys and excess death statistics it was estimated that Covid-19 mortality through September 2021 has been under-reported in India by a factor of as much as 6 or 7.

== Population ==
Under-reporting of births and infant deaths in countries such as China has been documented.

== See also ==
- Fear of crime
- Institute for Public Accuracy
