= Miranda Devine =

Australian-American columnist and writer (born 1961)

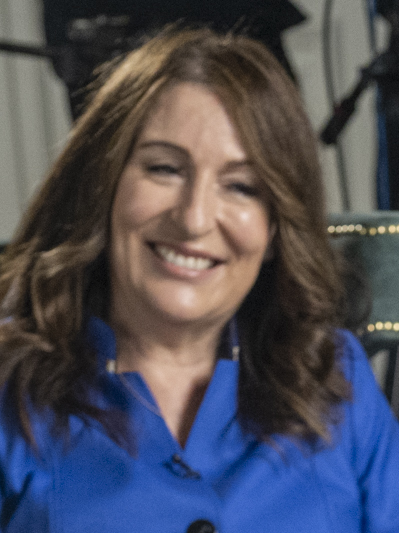
- Devine in 2025
- Born: July 1, 1961 (age 65); New York, New York
- Education: Macquarie University (BS); Northwestern University (Master of Journalism); University of Sydney
- Occupations: Columnist, Journalist, Author
- Employer: The New York Post
- Known for: Coverage of the Hunter Biden laptop story
- Father: Frank Devine

Miranda Devine is a conservative Australian-American columnist and writer, now based in New York City. She hosted The Miranda Devine Show on Sydney radio station 2GB until it ended in 2015. She has written columns for Fairfax Media newspapers The Sydney Morning Herald and The Sun-Herald, and for News Limited newspapers Daily Telegraph, Sunday Telegraph, Melbourne's Sunday Herald Sun, and Perth's Sunday Times. As of 2022, she writes for the New York Post. Some of her political opinion pieces and statements on the environment, race and social issues, such as likening the campaign for marriage equality to the tactics of ISIS and calling COVID-19 ‘the China Virus’, have been criticised as misrepresenting the facts and of ragebait journalism.

== Early life and education ==
Devine is the eldest daughter of Frank Devine, a New Zealand-born Australian newspaper editor and journalist, who died in 2009. She was born in New York, but grew up in Sydney and Tokyo, attending school at Loreto Kirribilli and the International School of the Sacred Heart respectively. She has a Master of Science in journalism from Northwestern University (USA) and a Bachelor of Science in mathematics from Macquarie University. Devine studied first-year architecture at the University of Sydney, where she was a resident at Sancta Sophia College and worked briefly at the CSIRO's Division of Textile Physics.

== Career ==
Devine worked for the Boston Herald as a reporter and feature writer. In 1989, Devine joined The Daily Telegraph as assistant editor, police reporter, and columnist after returning to Australia to live in Sydney. She had also previously worked at the British tabloid the Sun and the British newspaper Sunday Times in London. Most recently, Devine's columns, focused on United States politics, are published by the New York Post and she makes appearances promoting her articles on local media outlets. The New York Post launched Devine's Pod Force One podcast with a Donald Trump interview on 11 June 2025. Devine formerly lived in Sydney with her husband and two sons. Devine is the author of the book Laptop from Hell: Hunter Biden, Big Tech, and the Dirty Secrets the President Tried to Hide.

== Commentary ==
Devine takes a conservative stance on a range of social and political issues. In April 2016, she coined the term "delcon" (delusional conservative) to describe conservatives who remained loyal to Tony Abbott after the Liberal Party ousted him in favour of Malcolm Turnbull.

=== Race ===
In 2002, Devine opined in The Sydney Morning Herald that the racial element of the Sydney gang rapes had been "airbrushed" out of the media coverage of the events. She stated that the victims alleged that prosecutors had intentionally "censored" their official statements to remove any mention of racially sensitive material. Devine has also been accused by The Guardian and The Sydney Morning Herald of promoting the white genocide conspiracy theory and has been described as pivotal in popularising the concept within Australian politics. Referring to white South African refugees as "oppressed white, Christian, industrious, rugby and cricket-playing Commonwealth cousins", she has claimed they would "integrate seamlessly" with European Australians.

=== Environment ===
Devine suggested in 2009 that conservationists were to blame for the poor management of forested areas and national parks, and consequently for the deaths during the Black Saturday bushfires event. This rhetoric was revived during the 2019–20 Australian bushfire season, but promptly rejected by the scientific and firefighting community. In 2017, she claimed that shared bicycle schemes were a terror threat. Devine is also a climate change denier, advocating for the continuation of coal-fired electricity production and she has repeatedly stated that climate change is a political conspiracy.

=== Gender and LGBTIQ issues ===
In her comments in The Daily Telegraph on the breach of duty of care lawsuit brought by 14-year-old gay student Christopher Tsakalos against the New South Wales Education Department in 1997, Devine poured cold water on the possibility of ever protecting LGBT+ students from discrimination and assault, asserting that to do so, "you would have to make mincing homosexuality the norm in schools." Devine also accused the Gay and Lesbian Teachers and Students Association of coaching Tsakalos' camp performance for financial reward, and to make him into "an international poster boy for the homosexual movement", a speculation strenuously refuted by his mother.

In 2011, Devine used the news of Australian federal government minister Penny Wong's decision to parent a child with her female partner as the basis of a column in which she argued that the 2011 riots in England were the result of a "fatherless society". Writing for ABC News, Catherine Deveny criticised Devine's claim that same-sex marriage was a "political tool to undermine the last bastion of bourgeois morality - the traditional nuclear family". Devine sparked further controversy in 2015 after claiming that "women abusing welfare" were the main cause of domestic violence in Australia and contending "if you want to break the cycle of violence, end the welfare incentive for unsuitable women to keep having children to a string of feckless men". In 2016, Devine again caused controversy by comparing the purported "vilification" of opponents of same-sex marriage in Australia to the victims of beheadings by ISIS, saying that critics of same-sex marriage were being "brutally made examples of" by "intolerant authoritarians".

=== George Pell ===
In 2019, Devine defended Cardinal George Pell, at the time facing charges of which he was ultimately acquitted, related to the sexual assault of two 13-year-old boys, claiming that the victim's "accusations are implausible" and that "Victoria police chief Graham Ashton desperate for a distraction from the crime epidemic he's incapable of stopping".

=== Donald Trump ===
Devine supported US President Donald Trump. In February 2020, Devine was reported to be "over the moon" after being retweeted by Trump. In October 2020, The Guardian described her as "one of Trump's favourite writers" after the President again retweeted one of her articles. Devine drew criticism for a "fantastically fawning love letter" to Trump in which she described him as an "invincible hero" after his recovery from COVID-19 and called COVID-19 "the Chinese virus". Devine has since repeated Donald Trump's unsuccessful attempts to overturn the 2020 United States presidential election with unsubstantiated claims that Joe Biden's victory in the 2020 United States presidential election was driven by large-scale electoral fraud. In January 2021, Devine blamed past Black Lives Matter demonstrations for the actions of rioters during the 2021 storming of the United States Capitol.

=== Quaden Bayles ===
In February 2020, Devine alleged in a series of tweets that a video showing Quaden Bayles, an Indigenous boy with achondroplasia dwarfism, crying after being bullied at school, was a scam and that Bayles was actually an adult actor. That led to Quaden's mother, Yarraka, suing Devine for defamation on behalf of her son, and also suing on her own behalf over Devine's suggestion she had coached Quaden.

In September 2020, ahead of a settlement of the suit, Devine, who was on secondment at the New York Post, tweeted an apology for her allegations that the video had been faked. Shortly after this, The Guardian reported that the Bayles family settled with Devine for almost $200,000 in damages plus legal costs.

=== Hunter Biden ===
Miranda Devine has been cited as the source for a rental application of Hunter Biden's purporting to have previously paid $49,910 of rent a month at a previous property. This has been construed by Tucker Carlson, Judge Jeanine and other Fox News hosts as proof of money laundering within the Biden family. The fact checking website PolitiFact says out that this claim is wrong, and that the actual property referenced is Hunter Biden's office space in the House of Sweden building on K Street, Washington, D.C.

=== Grenfell tower fire ===
In June 2017, soon after the Grenfell Tower fire in London, Devine claimed that "aluminium composite cladding was applied to the building last May, not just for its good looks but as a sustainable energy solution to achieve green ticks in the carbon-obsessed British regulatory system." and that "Green ideology has given us...now flammable cladding." Australian television program Media Watch said in September 2024 that the Grenfell Tower Inquiry found "no evidence of 'green ideas' contributing to Grenfell Tower inferno that killed 72 people, despite News Corp columnists Rowan Dean and Miranda Devine stirring up a culture war seven years ago."

== Recognition ==
=== Samizdat Prize (2024) ===
Devine was one of the inaugural recipients of this award, established by RealClearPolitics to honor individuals who demonstrate exceptional courage in upholding the principles of the First Amendment and resisting censorship.

=== MRC Bulldog Award for Outstanding Columnist (2022) ===
Presented by the Media Research Center, this award acknowledges conservative journalists who provide impactful and trustworthy commentary. Devine was recognized for her insightful columns and her book, Laptop from Hell, which delves into the controversies surrounding Hunter Biden and the unfounded pre-election censorship of the story by media and tech companies.

== Bibliography ==
- Devine, Miranda (30 November 2021). Laptop from Hell: Hunter Biden, Big Tech, and the Dirty Secrets the President Tried to Hide. Post Hill Press. ISBN 978-1-637581-06-3.
- Devine, Miranda (24 September 2024). The Big Guy: How a President and His Son Sold Out America. Broadside Books. ISBN 978-0-063374-81-2.
