= Frank Devine =

New Zealand-born Australian journalist (1931–2009)

Frank Devine (17 December 1931 – 3 July 2009) was a New Zealand–born Australian newspaper editor and journalist. Devine was born in the South Island city of Blenheim and started his career there aged 17 as a cadet on the Marlborough Express. In 1953, Devine worked for West Australian Newspapers in Perth, contributing to the Western Mail. He later worked as a foreign correspondent in New York, London and Tokyo before returning to Perth as editor of the Weekend News in 1970. In 1971, he was appointed editor-in-chief of Australian Reader's Digest. After ten years, he transferred to a senior editorial position at the Digest in New York.

Remaining in the United States, Devine was appointed editor at the Chicago Sun-Times by Rupert Murdoch. In 1986, he left Chicago to take on the role of editor at the New York Post. In later life, Devine was a columnist and editor of The Australian. He contributed a monthly column for Quadrant from 2002 to 2009; he prepared a collection of these columns, Older and Wiser, just before he died.

He married Jacqueline Magee in April 1959, with whom he had three children. The eldest, Miranda Devine, has been a columnist for the Sydney Morning Herald and the Daily Telegraph.

== Bibliography ==
=== Books ===
- Devine, Frank (2009). Older and wiser : essays by Frank Devine 2002-2009. Balmain, NSW: Quadrant Books.

=== Articles ===
- Devine, Frank (July–August 2003). "Ranting and raving about America". Quadrant. 47 (7–8 [398]): 60–62.
