= John Sackar =

The Honourable John Robertson Sackar AM KC

Judge of the Supreme Court of New South Wales
- In office February 2011 – 16 February 2024

Personal details
- Education: Sydney Boys High School
- Alma mater: The University of Sydney
- Occupation: Lawyer, barrister, judge, mediator

John Robertson Sackar AM KC is a retired judge of the Supreme Court of New South Wales. Sackar is an Australian King's Counsel who has also appeared in the courts of London and Brunei, including before the Judicial Committee of the Privy Council. Retired from the bench in 2024, Sackar is now a mediator.

== Education and early legal career ==
Sackar attended Sydney Boys High School and then Sydney University, graduating with a Bachelor of Laws in 1972 after initially studying medicine. He would later go on to receive a Master of Laws from the same institution.

Sackar was admitted to practice as a solicitor in 1973, beginning his legal career at Hickson Lakeman & Holcombe (now Hicksons Lawyers) as an articled clerk under the guidance of David Kirby and Jim Poulos. Sackar then practised as a solicitor at Dawson Waldron (now Ashurst Australia).

== Years as a barrister ==
Sackar was called to the New South Wales Bar in 1975 and appointed Queen's Counsel in 1987. He was a member of the Sixth Floor of Selborne Chambers in Phillip Street, Sydney for most of his time at the Bar. He specialised in defamation actions. Malcolm Turnbull, later to become an Australian Prime Minister, read with Sackar in his early years at the NSW Bar. Sackar was called to the Middle Temple in London during 2006, with chambers at 4-5 Gray's Inn Square.

== Judicial appointment ==
Sackar was appointed to the Supreme Court of New South Wales in February 2011. He sat in the Equity Division of the Court and was its Expedition list Judge. In 2017, Sackar heard a dispute between Seven West Media and Amber Harrison concerning an affair between Harrison and Seven West chief executive officer Tim Worner. In 2019, Sackar heard a dispute launched by Australian artist and Archibald Prize winner John Olsen concerning the misappropriation of funds from the bank account of his deceased wife, Katherine, by Olsen's stepdaughter, Katharine. In 2021, he presided over defamation proceedings brought by actor Craig McLachlan against The Sydney Morning Herald and the Australian Broadcasting Corporation.

In 2022-2023, Sackar led the Special Commission of Inquiry into LGBTIQ Hate Crimes, which was set up to "investigat[e] unsolved suspected hate crime deaths of LGBTIQ people (or people who were presumed to be LGBTIQ) in NSW between 1970 and 2010".

Sackar retired as a judge in February 2024.

== Post-judicial career ==
In 2025, Sackar conducted a review for the Attorney General of New South Wales into the State's laws concerning hate speech and racial vilification. His mandate was to "consider criminal law protections against hate speech for vulnerable communities".

== Personal life ==
Sackar is a collector of art, books and artefacts, as well as an agriculturalist. He has three children from his first marriage, and one from his second.

He was appointed a Member of the Order of Australia in the 2025 Australia Day Honours for "significant service to the judiciary, and to law". Since 2019, Sackar served as president and chair of the Arts Law Centre of Australia, a non-profit organisation.

== Published works ==
- Lord Devlin. Hart Publishing. 2020. p. 256. ISBN 978-1509923700.
