= Star Observer =

Free Australian LGBTQ newspaper

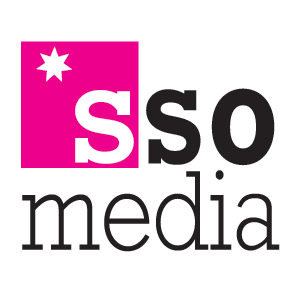
- Type: Monthly magazine
- Format: Tabloid and online
- Owner: Out Publications (since 20 June 2019)
- Publisher: Out Publications
- Staff writers: 2
- Founded: 1979
- Language: English
- Headquarters: Ultimo, NSW, Australia
- Circulation: 20,000 (June 2021)
- ISSN: 0819-5129
- OCLC number: 26727666
- Website: www.starobserver.com.au

The Star Observer is a free monthly magazine and online newspaper that caters to the lesbian, gay, bisexual, transgender and intersex communities in Australia.

Since 20 June 2019 the Star Observer has been owned by media company Out Publications.

== History and readership ==
The newspaper was initially published by Michael Glynn as a tabloid in 1979 under the name The Sydney Star and is the oldest and largest publication of its kind in Australia. In 1982 the paper changed its name, becoming The Star (1982–1985), later undergoing several name changes, including Sydney's Star Observer (1986–1987), Sydney Star Observer (1987–2014; 2019 onwards) and Star Observer (2014–2019).

The typical profile of the audience is aged between 23 years and 50 years, with a higher than average income level. With a 2015 audited circulation in excess of 15,000 per month, the publishers at that time claimed a readership exceeding 41,000 readers in print and 100,000+ online.

In late 2013, Elias Jahshan was appointed editor; shortly afterwards, the publication ceased being a weekly newspaper and became a monthly magazine.

On 20 June 2019 it was reported that the Star Observer was saved from voluntary administration by media company Out Publications.

As of April 2024, the Managing Editor is Chloe Sargeant, who manages both the print and digital output of the outlet nationally.

Previous editors have included Corey Sinclair, Andrew M. Potts, Peter Hackney, Shibu Thomas, and Douglas Magaletti.

In mid-2019, Out Publications began a sister publication in Melbourne, the Melbourne Star Observer. Its contents are identical to the Sydney title except that local advertisements are inserted. A homonymous masthead, founded in 1985 by Danny Vadasz of Gay Publications Co-operative Ltd., was in circulation until 2000.

== Format and content ==
In hardcopy tabloid format, The Star (as it is commonly known) is published on the third Thursday of each month and is distributed to numerous locations in Sydney and Melbourne. Copies can be found in cafés, libraries, cinemas, theatres, book shops, medical practices and community centres as well as gay and lesbian community outlets such as pubs, nightclubs, gay and lesbian friendly retail shops, gyms and sex on premises venues.

Both the tabloid publication and online version contain local, national, and international coverage related to gay and lesbian news, opinion and lifestyle. Non-specifically gay and lesbian items, such as arts and culture, real estate and technology are also covered. A strong focus of the publication is on community, such as sport, gay and lesbian business events, and opinion.

Each year special publications are produced to celebrate Sydney Gay and Lesbian Mardi Gras, Midsumma Festival and Mardi Gras Film Festival.

== Notable coverage ==
The Star Observer extensively covered the campaign to decriminalise homosexuality in New South Wales, which was enacted on May 22, 1984, by the Parliament of New South Wales.

During the AIDS Epidemic, the Star Observer ran in-depth articles concerning public prejudice, medical treatments and insurance claim problems.

The Star Observer also extensively covered Gay Gang Murders by youths that occurred in Sydney over several decades, including the murder of Scott Johnson, and the murder of Richard Johnson by the 'Alexandria Eight'. Journalist Martyn Goddard, who had replaced Tim Carrigan as Star Observer editor in 1989, covered the story both in the Star, and the Sydney Morning Herald.

== Community support ==
The shareholders of the publishing company have never drawn dividends from any profits generated by the Star Observer. Instead, the Star Observer has made donations to support the community through entities such as the AIDS Trust, Victorian AIDS Council, the Bobby Goldsmith Foundation and Twenty10 as well as others.
