= Ross Warren =

Australian gay journalist (1964–1989)

- Warren in the 1980s
- Born: Ross Bradley Warren; 1964; Wollongong, New South Wales, Australia
- Died: 22 July 1989 (aged 25); Tamarama, New South Wales, Australia
- Occupation: Television presenter

Ross Warren was an Australian journalist for WIN Television who was killed as part of the Gay Gang Murders on 22 July 1989. Having disappeared after a night out with friends on Oxford Street, Warren's car was discovered outside Marks Park, Sydney, a popular gay beat. His car keys were found two days later at the bottom of the adjoining cliffs. Police initially theorised that Warren had faked his own disappearance, concluding after four days that he had accidentally fallen into the sea. A search was undertaken, however his body was never recovered. In 2005, the case was recategorised as a homicide, the previous investigation being described as "grossly inadequate" and "shameful" by the deputy coroner Jacqueline Milledge. Today his murder is seen as one of many slayings and hate-crimes committed on the cliffs of Marks Park in the 1980s and 1990s. His name is listed on a memorial to the victims of these crimes located at the site.
