= Blue card (Australia) =

Blue Card Services administers the blue card system—Queensland’s Working with Children Check.

The blue card system is used in Queensland, Australia as a prevention and monitoring system for people working with children and young people. Other states in Australia have a similar working with children check, but are not called a "blue card".

== Purpose ==
All children in Queensland have a right to be safe and protected from harm. The blue card system regulates activities that are essential to children’s lives. These include childcare, education, sport, cultural activities and foster care. We check and monitor people who work in these industries and help organisations to create safe environments for children.

The blue card system is regulated by 2 pieces of legislation: the Working with Children (Risk Management and Screening) Act 2000 (the act) and the Working with Children (Risk Management and Screening) Regulation 2020.

== Criticism and reviews ==
The blue card system has been subject to ongoing scrutiny and review since its inception.

=== Processing delays ===
Community legal organisations have raised concerns about processing delays in the blue card system. According to LawRight's 2024 submission to the Queensland Parliament, applicants who receive a negative notice and seek review at the Queensland Civil and Administrative Tribunal (QCAT) face a minimum process length of approximately two years. LawRight's client data indicated an average of 350 days from application to the issuing of a negative notice where adverse information exists about an applicant.

=== QCAT review outcomes ===
Statistics on QCAT review outcomes have been cited in parliamentary inquiries. LawRight's 2024 data showed that 63 per cent of Blue Card matters finalised at QCAT were either set aside by the Tribunal or reconsidered by Blue Card Services during the QCAT process. Historical data from the Queensland Family and Child Commission indicated that in 2011-12, approximately 25 per cent of negative notices were overturned on review by QCAT.

=== Indigenous overrepresentation ===
The Queensland Human Rights Commission has identified concerns regarding overrepresentation of Aboriginal and Torres Strait Islander peoples in blue card negative notices. According to the Commission's submission to Parliament, Aboriginal and Torres Strait Islander people accounted for approximately five per cent of total blue card applicants but represented 22 per cent of those issued negative notices.

=== 2017 Queensland Family and Child Commission review ===
In 2017, the Queensland Family and Child Commission completed a comprehensive review titled "Keeping Queensland's Children More Than Safe: Review of the Blue Card System". The review found that while the blue card system provided "a strong foundation for creating safe environments for children", it required reform in several areas including governance, stakeholder support, and public understanding of the system's limitations. The review noted that working with children checks "cannot predict whether people will offend against children in the future" and that "over-reliance on the WWCC may create risks for children, as parents and carers may assume their children are safe when left with people who hold blue cards".

=== 2025 System Response Review ===
In January 2025, the Queensland Government announced a review into the blue card and child protection system following the conviction of childcare worker Ashley Paul Griffith, who was sentenced to life imprisonment in November 2024 for 307 offences against 69 children at childcare centres. Griffith had held a valid blue card throughout his period of offending because he had no prior criminal history that would have triggered a negative notice. The review, led by Queensland Family and Child Commission Child Death Review Board Chair Luke Twyford, is examining "weaknesses in laws, policies, procedures and practices, across early childhood education and care, police, and blue card systems".

The 2025 review progress report noted that "a Blue Card is a reactive tool and is unable to identify people who have not previously been detected for offending behaviours" and that "a lack of understanding of the limitations of the Blue Card system may result in a false sense of security in organisations where workers hold a Blue Card".

=== 2024 legislative reforms ===
In 2024, the Queensland Parliament passed the Working with Children (Risk Management and Screening) and Other Legislation Amendment Act 2024, implementing recommendations from the 2017 QFCC review. Changes coming into effect from September 2025 include modifications to the appeals process and adjustments to screening categories.

The blue card system contributes to the creation of safe service environments for children in various ways. Just as each piece of a jigsaw comes together to make a complete picture, the same applies to the blue card system. The different parts all play an essential role in keeping children and young people safe and it works best when all parts work together.

=== Blue Card Department inconsistencies and oversight ===
Blue Card Qld claims it contributes to the creation of safe service environments for children in various ways. However, this has not been reflected in significant child harm statistical data, with a 12.1 per cent increase in substantiated child protection investigations in Queensland between 2018–19 and 2024. Queensland had the third-highest rate of children in child protection services nationally in 2022–23 at 34.4 per 1,000 children. Notifications to child protection services have increased sharply, rising by 34.5 per cent over the past five years. Child protection applications and orders rose from 6,149 in 2022–23 to 6,626 in 2023–24, representing a 7.7 per cent increase.

Many notable offenders have breached the Blue Card system. In the most significant case, former childcare worker Ashley Paul Griffith pleaded guilty to 307 charges against 69 children at early learning centres in Brisbane and Italy between 2003 and 2022, despite holding a valid Blue Card throughout this period. Attorney-General Yvette D'Ath confirmed to a 2023 budget estimates hearing that Blue Card Services screening of Griffith "did not return any criminal history" and "there was no other relevant concerning information" returned to Blue Card Services in its screening processes. Griffith was sentenced to life imprisonment with a non-parole period of 27 years in November 2024. The Queensland Government subsequently launched a Commission of Inquiry into the child safety system in May 2025, describing it as "broken" with "long-term, systemic failures."

Another case involved the family of murdered foster child Tiahleigh Palmer. Foster father Rick Thorburn, who held a Blue Card and operated a family daycare centre, was convicted of murdering 12-year-old Tiahleigh in October 2015. Despite his criminal history, Thorburn had been approved as a foster carer because he had not been found guilty of committing anything classed as a "serious" crime under the Blue Card legislation at the time. This case prompted a government review and amendments to the Blue Card system.

In September 2025, it was reported that a childcare worker under police investigation for alleged physical violence against a child at one Ipswich facility was subsequently hired at another centre, with Queensland's Blue Card system failing to detect the ongoing investigation.

The Queensland Civil and Administrative Tribunal has overturned one in four Blue Card bans over a six-year period, granting Blue Cards to individuals including convicted drug offenders and those with violent criminal histories whom the Justice Department had deemed too risky to work with children.

The Working with Children (Risk Management and Screening) and Other Legislation Amendment Act 2024 was passed to implement 12 recommendations from the Queensland Family and Child Commission's review and strengthen safeguards for children.

The 4 components of the blue card system involve:

1. Who needs a blue card?
2. The blue card check.
3. Ongoing daily monitoring and compliance with blue card requirements.
4. Requirements to develop and implement a child and youth risk management strategy.
