= Anti-Discrimination Act 1977 =

Australian statute relating to discrimination

Anti–Discrimination Act 1977

Parliament of New South Wales
- Long title: An Act to render unlawful racial, sex and other types of discrimination in certain circumstances and to promote equality of opportunity between all persons.
- Citation: 1977 No 48
- Royal assent: 28 April 1977
- Commenced: 1 June 1977
- Administered by: The Attorney–General's Department

Legislative history
- Bill title: Anti-Discrimination Bill
- Status: Current legislation

The New South Wales Anti–Discrimination Act 1977 is an Act of the NSW Parliament, relating to discrimination in employment, the public education system, delivery of goods and services, and other services such as banking, health care, accommodation and night clubs.

The Act prohibits unlawful racial, sexual and other types of discrimination in certain circumstances and promotes equality of opportunity for all people.

The Act covers the following types of discrimination:

- Sex (including breastfeeding, pregnancy and sexual harassment)
- Disability (including past, present, future or perceived and actual disability)
- Actual or perceived HIV/AIDS status
- Race
- Actual or perceived Homosexuality
- Marital or domestic status
- Age
- Transgender status
- Carer’s responsibilities (but only within employment).

== Development ==
The Act was granted Royal Assent on 28 April 1977 and came into effect on 1 June 1977. It was the 48th Act of 1977. Since then the Act has been amended more than 90 times.

== Anti–Discrimination Board ==
The Anti–Discrimination Board of NSW was set up under the Anti-Discrimination Act 1977 to promote anti-discrimination and equal opportunity principles and policies throughout NSW and to administer the Act.

=== Functions of the Board ===
The Anti–Discrimination Board of NSW handles complaints of discrimination made by members of the public, investigating and conciliating complaints when appropriate.

It also works to prevent discrimination by means of consultations, education programs, seminars, presentations, media and community engagement, and informational materials.

In addition, the Board advises the Government on discrimination matters and makes recommendations to the Attorney General on some applications for exemption from the Act.

== Office of Director of Equal Opportunity in Public Employment ==
The Office of Director of Equal Opportunity in Public Employment (ODEOPE) administrates Part 9A of the Act, which pertains to Equal Employment Opportunity (EEO) across the public sector.

== Publicly threatening and inciting violence ==
In June 2018, both houses (the Legislative Council and the Legislative Assembly) of the Parliament of New South Wales unanimously passed and the Governor of New South Wales signed a Bill without amendment called the Crimes Amendment (Publicly Threatening and Inciting Violence) Bill 2018 to repeal the 1989 vilification laws within the Anti-Discrimination Act 1977 and replace it with criminal legislation with up to an explicit 3 year term of imprisonment within the Crimes Act 1900. The legislation went into effect on 13 August 2018 by proclamation on 8 August 2018.

== 2023 review ==
In 2023, the New South Wales government announced a review of the nearly 50 year old Anti-Discrimination Act 1977 to be undertaken by the NSW Law Reform Commission. As of 2025, the review of the 1977 Act by the NSW government is still being conducted.

== Exemptions ==
Both sport and very broadly-based religious exemptions within non-public schools still apply to explicitly allow discrimination on the grounds of “sex, gender, pregnancy and homosexuality exclusively” within NSW, allowing, for example, banning transgender people from female sports categories or expelling gay students and teachers from a Catholic-run school. Even religiously-run adoption agencies registered within NSW have an exemption to “deny and reject” same-sex couples adopting children. The president of the Anti-Discrimination Board can grant further exemptions.
