= Parents and citizens =

Some Australian state schools, both primary and high, are supported by parents and citizens' associations also known as PCA or P&C. These groups provide volunteer support, raise funds for infrastructure and other expenses and assist in the administration of their school.

A large part of many P&C activities is the provision of subsidies for school excursions and other supplemental and extracurricular activities.

P&Cs encourage the general public and local businesses to become involved with their local schools.

Recent years have seen a number of changes to the environment in which P&Cs operate.

- Volunteers sometimes require blue cards (criminal record checks) if they do not have children in the related school.
- Tuckshops and fundraisers are required to sell only healthy foods.
- Education Queensland has devolved many costs onto the school communities that were previously covered by the department. This has led to some schools requiring a "voluntary" payment from parents to cover consumables.

In Victoria, School Councils are similar to P&Cs, although they also have a more formal role in helping to manage the school.

== See also ==
- Parent-teacher association (PTA), the US and UK versions.
