= Killing of Scott Johnson =

American student, potential homicide victim

Scott Russell Johnson
- Born: 27 November 1961; Los Angeles County, California
- Died: 8–10 December 1988 (age 27); North Head, Sydney
- Body discovered: 10 December 1988

Scott Russell Johnson (27 November 1961 – 8 December 1988) was an American university student who died in Australia in 1988. The death was initially treated by the police as a suicide, but a coroner's inquest in 2017 resulted in the finding that he died "as a result of a gay-hate attack." In May 2020 Scott White, an Australian man, was arrested and charged for the murder. In January 2022 he was convicted. The conviction was overturned on appeal, and he then pled guilty to manslaughter.

In 2025, The New Yorker magazine reported on previously unseen evidence from the police investigation into Johnson's death, revealing details that call into question the integrity of the ultimate conviction.

== Background ==
Scott Russell Johnson was born on 27 November 1961 in Los Angeles County, California, United States. In 1983 he moved to England to study mathematics at the University of Cambridge. At Cambridge he met Michael Noone, a musicologist from Australia who became his partner. In 1986, Johnson left his doctoral program at the University of California, Berkeley and moved to Canberra on a student visa to complete his PhD at the Australian National University and to be with Noone.

== Death ==
Johnson's naked body was found on rocks at the foot of cliffs at Blue Fish Point in North Head near Manly in Sydney on 10 December 1988. His clothes and belongings were found on top of the cliff. Police initially claimed that his death was a case of suicide, which his brother, Steve Johnson, disputed.

== Aftermath ==
Steve Johnson campaigned for decades for his brother's death to be re-investigated. Family campaigning had led to coroners inquests in 2012 and 2017 recommending that police reopen the case. In 2017, a coroner found that Johnson had died as a result of a hate crime. Police offered an A$1 million reward in 2018 for information. His family later raised the reward to A$2 million in March 2020.

The conclusion that Johnson's death was the result of a hate crime drew attention to other homophobic killings around Sydney beaches in the 1980s. It is now estimated that many gay men were murdered in Sydney in the late 1980s, some of them pushed off cliffs. The New South Wales Police Force has since apologised for not investigating the murder of Johnson properly and failing to protect the gay community.

A film based on the case, The Surface of Venus, was announced in June 2024, to be written and directed by Nicholas Verso and produced by Nicholas Weinstock for Invention Studios.

=== Perpetrator ===
Scott White
- Born: c. 1970 (age 52–53)
- Convictions: Murder, overturned to manslaughter
- Penalty: 12 years and 7 months, reduced to 9 years
- Capture status: Incarcerated, eligible for parole in 2026
- Time at large: 31 years, 6 months, and 4 days

Details
- Date apprehended: 12 May 2020 (Lane Cove, New South Wales, Australia)

On 12 May 2020 a 49-year-old man, Scott White, was arrested in Lane Cove, Sydney, and charged with Johnson's murder. After being contacted about the arrest, Steve Johnson said: "This is a very emotional day, he was my best friend and he really needed me to do this." Steve Johnson also hopes that the arrest will open the doors for others to receive justice. He said: "I hope the family and friends of the other dozens of gay men who lost their lives find solace in what's happened today."

On 13 January 2022 Scott White was found guilty of murdering Scott Johnson in 1988 after changing his plea to guilty. He originally pleaded not-guilty but changed it on 10 January 2022 to guilty. His lawyer tried to have it withdrawn the next day under the guise of White being unfit to make the admission but the Supreme Court rejected the motion. On 3 May White was sentenced to 12 years and 7 months, with a non-parole period of 8 years and 3 months, based on laws at the time of the murder and White's own personal circumstances. The judge said, "That it was a gay hate crime is not a conclusion that the Court can reach to the criminal standard however". White later withdrew his guilty plea, and his murder conviction was overturned on appeal. On 23 February 2023 he pleaded guilty to manslaughter. On 8 June 2023 he was re-sentenced to 9 years in prison, with eligibility for parole after 6 years. He will be eligible for parole in 2026. The justice of the conviction has been questioned, as has Steve Johnson's well-financed campaign in pursuing the case. In May 2026, it was reported that Scott White the perpetrator withdrew an application for parole.

== See also ==
- Gay gang murders
