= LGBTQ rights in New South Wales =

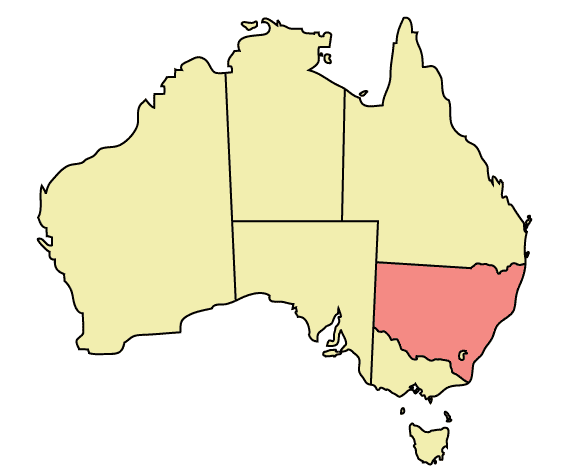
- New South Wales (Australia)
- Legal status: Always legal for women; legal for men since 1984; equal age of consent since 2003
- Gender identity: Change of sex on a birth certificate by self-determination since 2025
- Discrimination protections: Yes, in NSW since 1983; federally since 2013

Family rights
- Recognition of relationships: Same-sex marriage since 2017; domestic partnerships since 2010; recognition of same-sex marriages performed in other jurisdictions since 2014
- Adoption: Yes, since 2010

Lesbian, gay, bisexual, transgender and queer (LGBTQ) people in the Australian state of New South Wales have the same rights and responsibilities as heterosexual individuals and couples. LGBTQ rights in New South Wales enjoy bipartisan support. Since 4 April 2025 conversion therapy practices have been criminally banned within New South Wales.

== Laws regarding sexual activity ==
Private consensual sex between men has been legal in New South Wales since 1984, while lesbian sexual acts have never been criminalised. The age of consent for all forms of sex was equalised in 2003.

=== Historical criminalisation and persecution ===
Homosexuality was criminalised in New South Wales under section 79 of the Crimes Act 1900 (consent provisions were dealt with in section 78) which stated thus: "Whosoever commits the abominable crime of buggery, or bestiality, with mankind, or with any animal, shall be liable to imprisonment for fourteen years." In 1951, with the support of Police Commissioner Colin Delaney, who was noted for his obsession against homosexuality, Attorney General Reg Downing moved an amendment to the Act to ensure that "buggery" remained a criminal act "with or without the consent of the person", removing the previously existing legal loophole of consent.

The Campaign Against Moral Persecution, also known as C.A.M.P., was founded in Sydney in September 1970 and was one of Australia's first gay rights organisations. C.A.M.P. raised the profile and acceptance of Australia's gay and lesbian communities.

On 24 June 1978 gay rights activists in Sydney staged the Day of International Gay Solidarity, which included a morning protest march, lunchtime talks, and evening Street Festival (Mardi Gras), in response to a call from the San Francisco Gay Freedom Day Committee's call for international gay solidarity. Although the organisers had obtained permission, this was revoked, and the march was broken up by the police. Fifty-three of the marchers were arrested. Although most charges were eventually dropped, the Sydney Morning Herald published the names of those arrested in full, leading to many people being outed to their friends and places of employment, and many of those arrested lost their jobs as homosexuality was a crime in New South Wales until 1984. The event was held each year thereafter and is now known as the Sydney Gay and Lesbian Mardi Gras which celebrated its 30th anniversary in 2008. Following the first parade, New South Wales saw dozens of gay-hate murders from the late 1970s to the late 1990s, of which 30 remain unsolved. The prevailing climate of homophobia and lack of trust between the LGBT community and the police hampered the resolution of these cases.

The first attempt in New South Wales to bring about Gay law reform was in the form of an amendment to the 'Crimes (Sexual Assault) Amendment Act 1981', brought forward by Labor MP George Petersen in April 1981. This would have legalised consenting acts between adults. However, despite support from the Attorney General, Frank Walker, Young Labor, and public opinion polls that supported reform, it was defeated by the Catholic-dominated majority right faction of NSW Labor from inclusion before the act's introduction and was prevented from being included for debate in the Legislative Assembly by the Speaker, Laurie Kelly, who ruled it out of order. He did not appeal the ruling under threat of expulsion from the party. Undeterred, in November 1981 Petersen introduced a private member's bill which sought to decriminalise homosexual acts in NSW as well as equalise the age of consent to 16. However, after its first reading, the bill was adjourned at the request of opponents of law reform, who used it as an opportunity to rally opposition to the bill. When the bill came to a second reading, the Liberal/Country opposition voted as a bloc against it and over half of the Labor side, freed by the ability to vote according to conscience, joined them, to defeat it 67 votes to 28. During the 1980s and 1990s, Sydney was hit by a spate of gay bashings, hate crimes and murders, a large number of which remain unsolved. This was the subject of a Police investigation in the 2010s – 'Operation Taradale' – and called into question issues relating to police methods at the time and the state of homophobia in society and the police at the time.

Cooma Correctional Centre was dedicated to housing those convicted of male homosexual offences from the 1950s up until 1984 with legalisation in New South Wales.

=== Legalisation of male same-sex activity ===
It was in 1984 that the Neville Wran Government introduced, as a private member's bill, the 'Crimes (Amendment) Act 1984', which eventually decriminalised homosexual acts in NSW. The bill was supported by the absence of a conscience vote from the Labor side, was subsequently passed with support from some of the Opposition, including the leader Nick Greiner, on 22 May and was assented to on 8 June 1984. However this was done with an unequal age of consent of 18 (it was 16 for heterosexual and lesbian couples). It was only in May 2003, 19 years later, that the New South Wales Government equalised the age of consent to 16 under the Crimes Act 1900, with NSW being the third last jurisdiction to reform its unequal age of consent law.

=== Historical conviction expungement ===
In 2014, Gay Liberal Coogee MLA Bruce Notley-Smith introduced a private member's bill called the Criminal Records Amendment (Historical Homosexual Offences) Act 2014 to allow those convicted of historical private consensual adult gay male same-sex sexual activity to apply for it to be expunged. These historical convictions have denied men to employment, volunteering, travelling overseas and education. On 23 October 2014, the New South Wales Parliament unanimously passed the bill in both houses, and it was made into law by royal assent. The law became effective on 24 November 2014.

=== Apology on the 40th anniversary ===
In June 2024, on the 40th anniversary of the New South Wales Parliament decriminalising gay sex, the New South Wales Government issued a formal apology.

=== Censorship and book banning ===
In May 2024, the Cumberland City Council in western Sydney by a “close vote” of 6–5 has banned and sanctioned certain books within libraries – that discuses homosexuality and same sex couples, a form of censorship.

However, within a week, Cumberland City Council voted in favour of a motion to rescind the initial book ban due to community outrage and threats of losing NSW Government funding. Following four hours of debate, the motion was passed with 12 votes in favour and 2 against. Councillors Hughes, Cummings, Hussein, Garrard, and Zaiter changed their position from 1 May to support the rescission motion on 15 May 2024.

== Recognition of same-sex relationships ==
=== Same-sex marriage ===
Same-sex marriage became legal in New South Wales, and in the rest of Australia, in December 2017, after the Federal Parliament passed a law legalising same-sex marriage.

New South Wales had previously made a number of law reform attempts relating to same-sex marriage. In November 2013, a bill to legalise state-based same-sex marriage failed in the upper house of parliament by 21 votes to 19. In December 2013, the Australian Capital Territory's same-sex marriage legislation was declared unconstitutional by the High Court of Australia due to inconsistency with the federal Marriage Act 1961. This ruling clarified that the New South Wales Parliament did not have the legal capacity to legislate for same-sex marriage in the absence of a federal same-sex marriage law. Since 14 November 2014 overseas same-sex marriages became fully recognised under the state relationship register.

On 24 June 2015, the Parliament of New South Wales passed a motion unanimously calling on the federal government, to pass the Marriage Equality Bill 2015, based on a conscience vote. Both Tasmania and Western Australia also passed a similar motion.

Motion wording:

1. Notes Members of the New South Wales Parliament and community hold various views on the issue of marriage equality 2. Wishes our federal colleagues a respectful debate that is tolerant of all views 3. Notes the importance of MPs being free to express their own view and the views of their electorates on this issue

=== Northern beaches public health order ===
In December 2020, three years after same-sex marriage was officially legalized throughout Australia, a "public health order" during the COVID-19 pandemic that just applied to the Northern Beaches Council in Sydney banned same-sex couples kissing at marriages ceremonies by the words "bride and groom only" explicitly listed within the public health order – but allowed and permitted heterosexual couples kissing to continue at marriage ceremonies. The public health order was in effect for a full week before being revoked.

=== De facto couples ===
In 1999, the Property (Relationships) Legislation Amendment Act 1999 was introduced, which recognised same-sex couples in a variety of legislation, including the Workers Compensation Act, the Victims Compensation Act and the Criminal Procedure Act 1986. Further rights were given in 2002 through the Miscellaneous Acts Amendment (Relationships) Act 2008

On 6 September 1999, the Attorney General of New South Wales Jeff Shaw requested the Law Reform Commission of New South Wales to inquire into Relationships and the Law. The inquiry, which followed new relationship and property laws at the time, also looked at children of same-sex couples and recognition of their relationship with both parents. The commission's report on relationships was very extensive, included many recommendations and took the LRC itself seven years to complete. The report was handed to the previous NSW Attorney-General in June 2006. New South Wales Attorney General John Hatzistergos blocked access to the report for two years on the grounds he would table it in parliament sometime in the future. Previous reports by the commission have recommended stepparent adoption provisions to include same-sex de facto relationships.

The City of Sydney created a Relationships Declaration Program in 2005 available for all couples offering limited legal recognition. While making a relationship declaration does not confer legal rights in the way marriage does, it may be used to demonstrate the existence of a de facto relationship within the meaning of the NSW Property (Relationships) Act 1984 and other legislation. Following in the footsteps of the City of Sydney, the Municipality of Woollahra established a relationship register in December 2008. It was unanimously approved by the Woollahra Council. Members of the council also urged New South Wales to follow suit. In March 2010, the City of Blue Mountains announced it would also offer all couples limited legal recognition.

On 4 June 2008, the New South Wales Parliament passed the Miscellaneous Acts Amendment (Same Sex Relationships) Act 2008 which recognises co-mothers as legal parents of children born through donor insemination, provides birth certificates allowing both mums to be recognised, creates amendments to 57 pieces of NSW legislation to ensure de facto couples, including same-sex couples, are treated equally with married couples, and creates amendments to the NSW Anti-Discrimination Act to ensure same-sex couples are protected from discrimination on the basis of their "marital or domestic status" in employment, accommodation and access to other goods and services. The bill passed with a vote of 64–11. The Law Reform Commission report recommended an optional statewide registry for same-sex couples. Although the Government initially declined to implement this reform back in 2007, it proceeded in creating a relationships registry in 2010 (see below).

=== Registered relationships ===
In February 2010, New South Wales Attorney General Hatzistergos announced that the state government will introduce legislation for a statewide relationships register modelled on ones already in place in the ACT, Victoria and Tasmania. Entering into a "registered relationship" provides conclusive proof of the existence of the relationship, thereby gaining all of the rights afforded to de facto couples under state and federal law without having to prove any further factual evidence of the relationship. In this way, a registered relationship is similar to a registered partnership or civil union in other parts of the world. The law came into effect on 1 July 2010.

The Relationships Register Act 2010 was introduced to the NSW Legislative Assembly on 23 April 2010. The bill was approved by the NSW Legislative Assembly on a 62–9 vote on 11 May 2010, and then by the NSW Legislative Council (upper house) on a 32–5 vote on 12 May 2010. The bill was assented on 19 May 2010. The law took effect on 1 July 2010.

Since 1 January 2019, relationship ceremonies have been legally available as an optional extra for de facto couples within NSW.

== Discrimination protections ==
In 2024, a private members bill was introduced to explicitly ban and outlaw heterosexual discrimination practices within NSW.

In 1977, the Anti-Discrimination Act 1977 which prohibits discrimination in places of work, the public education system, delivery of goods and services, and other services such as banking, health care, property and night clubs was passed in New South Wales. Among other things, it covers homosexuality, marital or domestic status, transgender status, as well as HIV/AIDS status. Homosexuality was added in 1983, vilification of certain groups was added in 1993 (repealed in August 2018 and replaced explicitly with "publicly threatening and inciting violence law" within the NSW Crimes Act 1900), transgender status and HIV/AIDS status (under disability) was added in 1996 and then in 2008, marital or domestic status was added. The use of the term "homosexual" in this act means bisexuality is only covered if the discrimination is about the "homosexual" aspects of their life, or their perceived "homosexuality". As of 2023, the NSW government is “commissioning a review” as formally announced - to the nearly 50 year old Anti-Discrimination Act 1977 legislation.

Federal law also protects LGBT and Intersex people in New South Wales in the form of the Sex Discrimination Amendment (Sexual Orientation, Gender Identity and Intersex Status) Act 2013.

Also both sport and very broadly-based religious exemptions within non-public schools – still apply to explicitly allow discrimination on the grounds of “sex, gender, pregnancy and homosexuality exclusively” within NSW. For example banning transgender people from female sports categories and expelling gay students and teachers within a Catholic-run school. Even religiously-run adoption agencies registered within NSW have an exemption to “deny and reject” same-sex couples adopting children.

=== Abolition of gay panic defence ===
In May 2014, the NSW Parliament passed the (unanimously in both houses) that abolishes the "gay panic defence" within common law. The law commenced in June 2014.

=== Disability Inclusion Act 2014 ===
In June 2022, a Greens amendment to a government bill supported and passed by the NSW government unanimously – explicitly include and recognise LGBTIQ+ individuals with a disability within NSW, to be added to legislation called the Disability Inclusion Act 2014. The bill passed both houses of the NSW Parliament in the same month. The bill was assented by the Governor, effective immediately since 1 July 2022.

== Adoption and parenting rights ==
=== Adoption ===
Same-sex adoption has been legal since 15 September 2010, when the Adoption Amendment (Same Sex Couples) Act received royal assent and entered into force. In July 2009 the Law and Justice Committee of the New South Wales Parliament recommended that the Adoption Act should be amended to allow same-sex couples the right to adopt. Committee chair Christine Robertson said, "The committee has concluded that reform to allow same-sex couples to adopt will help to ensure that the best interests of children are met by our adoption laws." Initially, the Labor government refused to implement the recommendations, arguing that there was no broad community support for such legislation. However, in August 2010, independent MP and Lord Mayor of Sydney Clover Moore introduced the Adoption Amendment (Same Sex Couples) Bill as a private member's bill. Both the NSW Premier Kristina Keneally and the Opposition Leader Barry O'Farrell allowed a conscience vote on the bill. The bill was approved by the Legislative Assembly on 2 September 2010 in a 46–44 vote, and by the Legislative Council on 9 September 2010 in a 22–15 vote. The Act allows same-sex couples living in a de facto or registered relationship to adopt jointly, as well as to adopt their partner's children (step-child adoption). The legislation was amended by MP Frank Sartor from the Labor-right faction to explicitly exempt any religious institutions and organizations from the Adoption Act, and also the Anti-discrimination Act 1977 that prevents discrimination on the basis of homosexuality does not apply to the Adoption Act when adopting children. In March 2017, the Supreme Court of New South Wales upheld the 2010 legislation that allows same-sex couples to legally adopt children – with various legal challenges by Catholic groups and individuals. Since April 2018, all eight Australian jurisdictions legally allow same-sex couples to adopt children.

=== Assisted reproduction ===
All women (regardless if they are single, married or in a relationship with another person) are permitted access to IVF treatment in New South Wales under the Assisted Reproductive Technology Act 2007. Medicare funding, however, requires the couple to be medically infertile, which makes it only available to heterosexual couples because of an assumption that the man is medically infertile. A lesbian couple would likely not have a medical condition that makes the couple infertile. The Artificial Conception Act 1984 (NSW) gave children conceived via artificial insemination the same status as children conceived naturally; in other words, the birth mother and her husband were deemed to be the legal parents. This was later repealed and updated with the Status of Children Act 1996 (NSW) which said the same thing, but accounted for a donated ova. The specific wording did not allow the birth mother's female partner to be legally recognised. The Miscellaneous Acts Amendment (Same Sex Relationships) Act 2008 passed on 4 June 2008 recognises co-mothers as legal parents of children born through donor insemination and provides birth certificates allowing both mums to be recognised. Adoption and surrogacy reforms were not included. Male couples were excluded from most of the parenting-related legislation. There has been controversy with clause 17 in the Assisted Reproductive Technology Act 2007 that allows donors to nominate classes of people to whom their sperm or eggs may not be given, opening the way for discrimination against ethnic, religious and other minorities, including same-sex couples.

=== Surrogacy ===
Prior to 2007, there were no laws in place to deal with surrogacy in the state. This changed with the Assisted Reproductive Technology Act 2007 which declared commercial surrogacy to be illegal and all surrogacy contracts to be void. The bill reiterated previous legislation, declaring that the birth mother and her husband are lawfully deemed to be the legal parents.

The Surrogacy Act 2010 passed the NSW parliament on 11 November 2010 and the bill received royal assent on 16 November 2010. The law commenced on 1 March 2011. The surrogacy law only will recognise non-commercial surrogacy arrangements (the laws are also retrospective). Commercial surrogacy, advertising surrogacy arrangements and also going overseas to enter into a surrogacy arrangement is illegal under the Surrogacy Act 2010. However, effective from 1 July 2025 under equality legislation recently adopted by NSW – children and babies born from commercial surrogacy based arrangements overseas are “automatically recognized from the moment of conception”. This immediately removes a loophole that prevented thousands of children and babies within NSW getting access to a birth certificate, because the parents have chosen a commercial surrogacy arrangement overseas.

== Transgender rights ==
Birth certificates and driver licences are within the jurisdiction of the states, whereas marriage and passports are matters for the Commonwealth.

Between 1996 and up until June 30 2025, sexual reassignment surgery – plus a $153 fee has been legally required to change sex on a birth certificate within NSW. The new birth certificate will not disclose that a change of sex has taken place. The divorce requirement after a change of sex was abolished in June 2018, after the legalization of same-sex marriage. Since 1 July 2025 a change of sex on a birth certificate within NSW does not legally require sexual reassignment surgery along with other jurisdictions across Australia - just an application form, an adult you have known for a year that is not related to you as a witness in good faith and a $73 fee for processing is all that is needed. A loophole was discovered, unlike a change of name where you are severely limited to one change of name on a birth certificate - once every 12 months and up to three times within an individuals lifetime, a change of sex within NSW has no restrictions or limits whatsoever. It was reported within September 2025 that 766 individuals have legally changed their sex on a birth certificate since the 1 July 2025 changes in NSW.

In October 2020, the NSW Parliament lower house passed a "non-binding bipartisan motion" unanimously – calling for the human rights, dignity and respect for transgender individuals within NSW.

=== Non-binary recognition ===
In April 2014, the High Court of Australia ruled that Australian law allows the registration of a "change of sex" to "non-specific" and does not require one to identify themselves as either male or female on identity documents. The case originated in New South Wales with proceedings brought by Norrie May-Welby.

=== Rainbow birth certificates ===
In March 2022, rainbow birth certificates became available for individuals born or adopted within NSW – without gender or sex listed to be inclusive and diverse. Victoria also has a similar schedule where rainbow birth certificates are available.

=== Transgender health leave ===
Inner West Council within Sydney voted to approve "transgender health leave" at a council meeting by conference. The NSW government has yet to approve, because it requires the local government minister's signature before it can go into effect.

=== Correctional facilities ===
In November 2024, it was reported by ABC News – that a transgender individual within a male prison was granted a settlement by the government of NSW. The settlement amount was undisclosed. Since 1996, under NSW government prisoners protocols and guidelines – transgender individuals “who have had sexual reassignment surgery” are allowed and permitted to be housed within female prisons for protection.

== Intersex rights ==
In March 2017, representatives of Androgen Insensitivity Syndrome Support Group Australia and Organisation Intersex International Australia participated in an Australian and Aotearoa/New Zealand consensus "Darlington Statement" by intersex community organizations and others. The statement calls for legal reform, including the criminalization of deferrable intersex medical interventions on children, an end to legal classification of sex, and improved access to peer support.

== Publicly threatening and inciting violence law ==
In June 2018, both houses of the Parliament of New South Wales unanimously passed and the Governor of New South Wales signed an urgent bill without amendments called the Crimes Amendment (Publicly Threatening and Inciting Violence) Act 2018 to repeal the vilification laws within the Anti-Discrimination Act 1977 and replace it with criminal legislation with up to an explicit 3-year term of imprisonment within the Crimes Act 1900. The legislation went into effect on 13 August 2018 – by proclamation on 10 August 2018.

=== Judicial inquiry ===
In November 2021, the NSW government made a formal announcement to start a judicial inquiry into LGBTIQ hate crimes that happened within NSW for decades. In November 2022, a year later the formal inquiry commenced work and is seeking information throughout NSW. In December 2022, NSW Police have been called to give evidence to the Commission into the 88 deaths of gay men between 1970 and 2000 within NSW. Several delays into paperwork and documents and several objections where raised so far.

=== 2022 legislation ===
In August 2022, a bill passed both houses of the NSW Parliament unanimously to legally ban Nazi symbols to protect the LGBTIQ community – under the NSW Crimes Act 1900 to be inline with Victoria, that has implemented similar assented legislation in June 2022. On 19 August 2022, the Governor of NSW assented the bill into an Act formally and went into legal effect immediately.

=== 2026 legislation ===
In March 2026, a hate crimes bill was introduced by the government that deals with hate crimes against gay and bi men within New South Wales with penalties up to 5 years imprisonment. The bill is yet to be debated within any chamber lower or upper house.

== NSW mental health law ==
Both sexual orientation and gender identity are not a mental illnesses, explicitly stated under section 16 of the NSW Mental Health Act 2007.

== Conversion therapy ==
Since 4 April 2025 legislation went into effect that explicitly bans conversion therapy practices on individuals within New South Wales.

In August 2019, the New South Wales Health Minister Brad Hazzard is proposing a potential national and state ban on the agenda. While NSW does not currently ban gay conversion therapy, disciplinary proceedings can be taken against a health practitioner who provides services in an unethical manner. However no bill has been introduced as of yet.

In February 2021, it was announced that a cross-party group of MPs of all political affiliations are planning to introduce a bill to ban conversion therapy within NSW.

Both major political parties have formally announced that after the NSW election is formally concluded in March, conversion therapy will be legally banned within NSW – inline with Queensland, Victoria and the Australian Capital Territory.

In August 2023, a new law passed, assented and implemented within NSW – that explicitly bans religious vilification alongside homosexuality, that could also "potentially possible ban any speech on gay conversion therapy theoretically and indirectly". The law goes into effect 3 months after royal assent. Vilification on homosexuality has exemptions since implemented in 1993, while religious vilification does not have exemptions.

In October 2023, it was announced that the Chris Minns Labor government would introduce a bill to ban conversion therapy practices in NSW "by the end of the year". However no bill was introduced and was delayed. Then in March 2024, a government bill was formally introduced to the lower house to explicitly ban conversion therapy with certain limited "religious and parental exemptions and carveouts" – with up to 5 years imprisonment.

The bill officially passed both houses of the NSW Parliament unamended on 22 March 2024 – and will go into effect 12 months after royal assent. The bill was passed in the upper house with 22 votes in favour and four against. However, the bill doesn't completely outlaw conversion therapy. There is still some exceptions given to religious groups, which includes, giving religious sermons preaching against homosexuality.

== Norfolk Island ==
Since 1 July 2016, all NSW laws also apply to the approximately 2,000 residents on Norfolk Island, under both the Norfolk Island Legislation Amendment Act 2015 and the Territories Legislation Amendment Act 2016 – because the Norfolk Island Legislative Assembly was abolished on 1 July 2015.

== NSW paid parental leave rights and entitlements ==
In February 2021, it was reported that paid parental leave rights and entitlements are only for female same-sex couples and not for male same-sex couples – due to an "archaic and outdated beliefs" that males are the breadwinner of the family and that the females are the homemaker. A NSW court case made an example that NSW law actually conflicted with federal law on paid parental leave rights and entitlements. Since 1 October 2022, reforms to the NSW parental leave rights and entitlements removed the archaic "breadwinner" and "homemaker" titles – to be inline with federal legislation.

== Gender-neutral bathrooms ==
In April 2023, Sydney City Council implemented a policy of gender-neutral bathrooms.

== NSW LGBTIQ+ advisory council and grant money ==
In May 2024, the NSW government has established a 16 member “LGBTIQ+ advisory council”.

In June 2026, the NSW government announced $250,000 funding grant money to Rainbow Families NSW for education campaigns, research and resources - subject to residents living within NSW only.

== NSW Heritage Listings ==
In January 2025, it was announced that the Palace Hotel within Broken Hill that filmed the 1994 Priscilla Queen of the Desert Australian movie is protected on the NSW Heritage Listing.

In February 2025, it was also announced that the gravesites of two men who were gay bushrangers from the 19th century would be added to the NSW Heritage Listings.

In March 2025, the Cooma Correctional Centre that experimented and locked up gay men from 1957 up until 1984 - was officially added to the NSW heritage listings.

== Summary table ==
Same-sex sexual activity legal	Yes (since 1984 for males; always for females)
Equal age of consent	Yes (since 2003)
Anti-discrimination laws that explicitly includes sexual orientation and transgender status	Yes (since 1983 and 1996 respectively)
Hate speech laws that explicitly includes sexual orientation and transgender status	No (under review)
Hate crime laws that explicitly includes sexual orientation and transgender status	Yes
Laws against vilification that includes sexual orientation and transgender status	Yes (since 1993 and 1996 respectively)
Gay sex criminal records expunged	Yes
Gay panic defence abolished	Yes
Recognition in state law of same-sex couples as domestic partners	Yes
Full joint/step adoption as well as full parentage from both IVF and altruistic surrogacy procedures for same-sex couples	Yes
Gender-neutral bathroom policy	Yes / No (some local government areas of Sydney only)
Intersex minors protected from invasive surgical procedures	No
Conversion therapy practices criminally banned	Yes (since 2025)
Same-sex marriage laws implemented federally	Yes (since 2017)
MSMs allowed to donate blood	Yes (Since 2026, on the condition of being monogamous)
Change of sex on a birth certificate by self-determination	Yes (since 2025)

== See also ==
- 2024 Cumberland book ban
- Transgender rights in Australia
- LGBT rights in the Australian Capital Territory
- LGBT rights in Queensland
- LGBT rights in Victoria
- Intersex rights in Australia
- LGBT rights in Australia
- Same-sex marriage in Australia
- Australian Marriage Law Postal Survey
