= City of Sydney Relationships Declaration =

Municipal relationship declaration program in Sydney

In July 2004, the City of Sydney Council, led by Lord Mayor Clover Moore, introduced a re-working of the former City of South Sydney's Partnership Registration scheme, renaming it the City of Sydney Relationship Declaration Program. The program is open to same-sex and opposite-sex couples.

It provides some limited legal relationship recognition, in that participating couples may produce their Declaration as partial evidence of the existence of their relationship in certain circumstances. It does not confer the same legal rights as marriage.

Legal considerations for potential applicants are outlined in both the information pack accompanying the application form and in Council Minutes (Item 3A, 28 July 2004).

== Public Repute Test ==
The Relationships Declaration may be used as contributory evidence towards satisfying the Public Repute Test. Solicitor Gerard Gooden states that to satisfy this test, evidence needs to be submitted that shows that the de facto couple had held themselves out to be in such a relationship in public.

Mr Gooden is a family law solicitor with extensive experience in law involving de facto relationships, including same sex relationships.

In a combined presentation to the MAG (Mature Age Gays association) he states that the De Facto Relationships Act applies "eleven tests to determine the legal validity of a de facto relationship" and that "gay men, can typically only satisfy four of these eleven criteria." One of these is the Public Respute test.

In Lord Mayor Clover Moore's minute (Item 3A) on 28 July 2004 information provided by Mr Gooden and Mr Martin Gorrick states that this Declaration may provide "probative (but not conclusive) evidence of the existence of the de facto relationship".

An excerpt from this minute states:

"A couple who makes their declaration publicly (ie in front of family and/or friends) may provide evidence relating to "the reputation and public aspects of the relationship" (see s4 (2) (i).)

== Identification ==
You can use the Relationships Declaration at banks and other financial institutions to prove your identity.

It is worth 25 points which gives it the same number of points as an Australian Marriage Certificate.

Financial institutions use AUSTRAC's 100 point ID system. According to this system, customers have to show various forms of ID to make up the 100 points, in order to be able to prove their identity. This means you have to present your Relationships Declaration (25 points) along with other forms of ID such as your passport or Medicare card, in order to make up the 100 points required.

The National Australia Bank (NAB) have directly confirmed that they will accept the Relationship Declaration as a form of ID worth 25 points.

However the Roads and Traffic Authority (RTA) will not accept the Relationships Declaration, even though they will accept a Marriage Certificate as ID – same sex couples do not have access to an Australian Marriage Certificate so this creates an unequal situation.

Other institutions such as the Registry of Births Deaths and Marriages no longer accepts an Australian Marriage Certificate as a form of ID – this creates an equal situation for both opposite sex and same sex couples as both are not allowed to present their relationship certificates as a form of ID.

== Superannuation ==
Zurich Financial Services and the Russell Superannuation state that the Relationship Declaration can be tendered as evidence of an interdependent relationship. It will provide contributory evidence but not conclusive evidence – that is, other evidence will still have to be submitted in order to prove the relationship existed.

When a person dies, the superannuation fund has limits on who it can distribute the dead person's superannuation funds to. For example, you have to prove you are a spouse or that you are interdependent.

== Application for a death certificate ==
In order to be able to gain a copy of a death certificate you must show that you are a close family member, spouse or otherwise entitled to a copy of the certificate.

The Relationships Declaration will be accepted as partial evidence towards proving that your de facto relationship existed with the deceased – and therefore will assist you in part in obtaining this document.

In addition, some funeral houses refuse to recognise the existence or rights of a same-sex relationship, and will not allow the surviving same sex partner to have any say in making the funeral arrangements for their deceased partner. A Relationships Declaration may provide some official proof to the funeral house that the relationship existed. The surviving same-sex partner does have a right to have a say in funeral arrangements, and if there are any problems, these should be referred to the NSW Registry of Births, Deaths and Marriages, NSW Anti-Discrimination Board, or the NSW Attorney General's Department. Understandably, due to the limited time that one has to prepare a funeral, one may not have time to receive an answer back from these bodies before the deceased partner is buried.

== Amendment of a death certificate ==
The Relationships Declaration will be accepted as partial evidence towards proving that your de facto relationship existed with the deceased.

At the very least, the Relationships Declaration proves that at some time in your lives you had a close personal relationship with the deceased. The Declaration does not prove that the relationship existed at the time of death – you can produce other evidence to show this.

Any de facto relationship (or marriage) that the deceased had may be listed on their death certificate (not only the one at the time of death).

== Immigration ==
There is at least one case of the Relationships Declaration being used successfully at the Chinese Embassy, in the case of an opposite-sex (heterosexual) relationship – where the partners did not have the opportunity to marry before immigration to China. The Declaration was used for the purposes of family visa application.

== How many have formed a registered partnership in Sydney? ==
Since 2004, both same-sex and mixed-sex couples can register, if both are unrelated, unmarried adults living in the City of Sydney. As of today, 224 opposite-sex and 77 same-sex couples had registered; 24 opposite-sex, 1 female same-sex couples and 9 male same-sex couples unregistered.

== Melbourne ==
Since 2007, Melbourne also has a relationship register, which is very similar to that of Sydney.

== How many have entered a registered partnership in Melbourne? ==
Since 2007, both same-sex and opposite-sex couples can register a partnership, if both are unrelated, unwed adults living in the City of Melbourne. As of today, ninety opposite-sex and eight same-sex couples have registered; four opposite-sex have unregistered, no same-sex couples have unregistered as yet.

== See also ==
Same-sex marriage in Australia
