= LGBTQ rights in the Northern Territory =

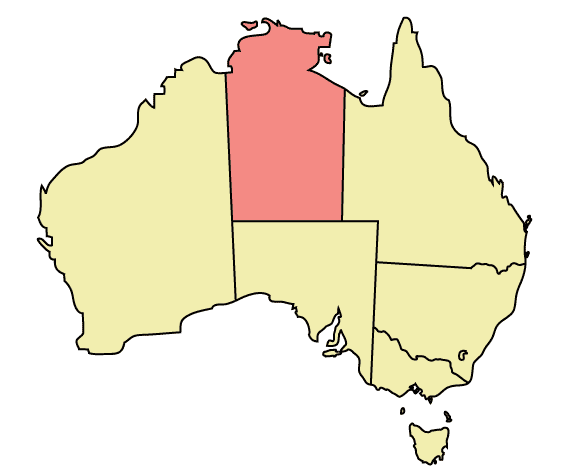
- Northern Territory (Australia)
- Legal status: Always legal for women; legal since 1 January 1984 for men Equal age of consent since 2003
- Gender identity: Change of sex marker on a birth certificate requires appropriate clinical treatment since 2018
- Discrimination protections: Yes (both federal and territory law)

Family rights
- Recognition of relationships: Same-sex marriage since 2017; Unregistered de facto unions recognised by territory law since 2003 (no civil union or relationship register)
- Adoption: Full adoption rights since 2018

Lesbian, gay, bisexual, transgender, and queer (LGBTQ) people in Australia's Northern Territory have the same legal rights as non-LGBTQ people. The liberalisation of the rights of LGBTQ people in Australia's Northern Territory has been a gradual process. Homosexual activity was legalised in 1984, with an equal age of consent since 2003. Same-sex couples are recognised as de facto relationships. There was no local civil union or domestic partnership registration scheme before the introduction of nationwide same-sex marriage in December 2017, following the passage of the Marriage Amendment (Definition and Religious Freedoms) Act 2017 by the Australian Parliament. The 2017 Australian Marriage Law Postal Survey, designed to gauge public support for same-sex marriage in Australia, returned a 60.6% "Yes" response in the territory. LGBTQ people are protected from discrimination by both territory and federal law, though the territory's hate crime law does not explicitly cover sexual orientation or gender identity however federal laws since 2025 do explicitly cover sexual orientation and gender identity. The territory was the last jurisdiction in Australia to legally allow same-sex couples to adopt children.

== History ==
Prior to European contact, there were no known legal or social punishments for engaging in homosexual activity. Sex seems to have been a very open topic among the Indigenous people. Among the Arrernte people (who live on the lands around Alice Springs), sex plays were particularly ubiquitous, even among young children who would play "mothers and fathers" in a very literal sense. They would typically mimic the sex acts they saw their parents and other adults perform. These acts seem to have been performed regardless of sex. Traditions of "boy-wives" also existed where young boys, typically 14 years of age, would serve as intimate servants of older men until they reached the age of initiation, at which point the young man would have his penis subincised. The Indigenous people did not have the typical Western view of heterosexuality and homosexuality.

The Tiwi Islands have the highest per capita population of transgender people in Australia. 5% of the Tiwi population identifies as transgender (also locally called sistergirls or brotherboys (Tiwi: yimpininni)). Similar identities exist among other Northern Territory indigenous peoples: kwarte kwarte among the Arrernte, kungka kungka among the Pitjantjatjara and the Luritja, karnta pia among the Warlpiri people, kungka wati among the Pintupi, and girriji kati among the Warumungu. While largely accepted by their communities, they face higher instances of rape and domestic violence.

== Laws regarding same-sex sexual activity ==
The Northern Territory became self-governing in 1978 and the unicameral territory Parliament, headed by the conservative Country Liberal Party Government, passed the territory Criminal Code Act 1983 in October 1983. This code legalised some homosexual sex acts between consenting adult males in private, though imposed a consent age of 18 for such acts, as opposed to an age of 16 for heterosexual sex acts. The law came into effect on 1 January 1984. The code furthermore banned homosexual anal sex and similar acts which were done "in public", defined as occurring within the presence of only one or more observer. Age of consent equalisation laws were achieved via the Law Reform (Gender, Sexuality and De Facto Relationships) Act 2003, which went into effect in March 2004.

=== Historical convictions expungement and apology ===
The Northern Territory was the second last Australian jurisdiction to introduce legislation providing for a scheme allowing people who have previously been convicted of consensual homosexual sex acts the right to apply to have their conviction deleted, or expunged. Following a story on the subject appearing on Triple J's popular youth radio program Hack, a spokesperson for the Northern Territory Labor Government stated it was soliciting advice on the topic and that "every Territorian has a right to dignity and respect."

On 21 March 2018, the Government introduced a bill into the Parliament. The bill would establish an expungement scheme in line with the schemes in other states and territories. The bill passed the Legislative Assembly on 8 May and received royal assent on 23 May 2018. The law, known as the Expungement of Historical Homosexual Offence Records Act 2018, went into effect on 14 November 2018. The law's passage was accompanied by a formal apology to the territory's LGBTI community for past discriminatory laws by Chief Minister Michael Gunner, which was supported by Opposition Leader Gary Higgins.

== Recognition of same-sex relationships ==
=== De facto unions ===
The Northern Territory is one of two jurisdictions in Australia not to offer relationship registries or official domestic partnership schemes to same-sex couples, the other being Western Australia. Cohabiting same-sex couples can be recognised as living in a de facto relationship, which cannot be registered but can be recognised by a court declaration for certain purposes.

De facto recognition was made possible following the Law Reform (Gender, Sexuality and De Facto Relationships) Act 2003 amending the territory's De Facto Relationships Act 1991 to define de facto relationships as "2 persons...not married but have a marriage-like relationship". This definition for the first time in the territory resulted in LGBTQ people having a mechanism in local courts to resolve property disputes with their ex-partners. Prior to this reform, the non-financial contributions of a same-sex partner to a relationship could not be recognised in the same way as marriage or heterosexual de facto relationships. This could lead in some cases to a non-working partner not being able to obtain an appropriate property settlement. Such reforms have since made it possible for same-sex couples in the NT to have most of the entitlements as married partners. It also provides for de facto partners to make certain legal agreements relating to financial matters between the partners and ex-partners.

In 2009, the then-Attorney General, Delia Lawrie, referred the matter of relationship registers to the Northern Territory Law Reform Committee, who declined to make a recommendation on the form that relationship recognition should take.

=== Same-sex marriage ===
Same-sex marriage became legal in the Northern Territory, and in the rest of Australia, in December 2017, following the Australian Marriage Law Postal Survey which gauged support for legalising same-sex marriage in Australia. After the support received in this survey the Federal Parliament passed a law legalising same-sex marriage.

During the survey 61% of people living in the Northern Territory indicated a yes 'vote', however, they had the lowest survey turnout rate in Australia with just over half of eligible respondents completing their surveys.

Throughout the survey there were a number of incidents were reported including the burning of approximately 50 survey forms in Ramingining, following a misunderstanding of the question being asked, and another in Gunbalanya where one local resident was allegedly seen completing several survey forms and marking them as 'no'.

== Adoption and parenting rights ==
Adoption law in the Northern Territory is governed by the Adoption of Children Act 1994. Prior to the legalisation of same-sex adoption in April 2018, the Act stipulated that territory courts "shall only make an order for the adoption of a child in favour of a couple where the man and woman are married to each other and have been so married for not less than 2 years". An informal review of the territory's adoption laws was believed to have been undertaken by then Minister for Children and Families John Elferink in November 2015, though no legislative reforms were made prior to the 2016 general election. Following that election, the territory's first gay indigenous MP Chansey Paech called for the Northern Territory to legalise same-sex adoption, indicating that some Cabinet ministers had already indicated their support to him.

In October 2017, the Government pledged to introduce legislation into the Parliament by the following month which would allow same-sex couples and unmarried couples the right to adopt children. It introduced such a bill to the Legislative Assembly on 23 November 2017. The bill was sent to the Social Policy Scrutiny Committee, which recommended that the Assembly pass the bill. It was approved by the Assembly on 13 March 2018, with independent member Gerry Wood the only MP to speak against the bill. The bill received royal assent on 19 April 2018, becoming the Adoption of Children Legislation Amendment (Equality) Act 2018, and commenced the following day. With respect to the right of single people to adopt, territory law allows this only in "exceptional circumstances".

Northern Territory law makes no mention of commercial or altruistic surrogacy arrangements, making both practices technically legal in the state, however, no clinics provide surrogacy services due to the lack of regulation. Assisted reproductive technology (ART) treatments like sperm donation are small in comparison to other states and territories, though it is believed lesbian couples in the Northern Territory have been accepted by clinics for ART treatments. Female de facto partners of pregnant women are treated under territory law as legal parents of any children born as a result of that birth.

On 31 March 2022, the “Surrogacy Bill 2022” was formally introduced to the Parliament – to legally allow children from surrogate parents and other parental agreements to be enforceable that implies formal recognition on birth certificates (to be uniform and consistent with all other jurisdictions across within Australia). This legally applies to individuals as well as couples of any sexual orientation and/or marital status. Same-sex couples for example, will no longer have to legally adopt their own children – which can take many years of both red tape and court orders. The bill passed the Parliament of the Northern Territory a month later (becoming the Surrogacy Act 2022 formally by the NT administrator) and went into legal effect on 20 December 2022.

== Rainbow pride flag ban ==
In February 2025, it was reported on that the NT government banned rainbow pride flags within hospitals.

== Discrimination protections ==
Since 2022, explicit legislation prohibits discrimination on the basis of sexual orientation, gender identity and sex characteristics within the Northern Territory. The legislation enacted is described as "the most comprehensive and robust" anti-discrimination legislation to ever pass within an Australian jurisdiction – along with Tasmania. Federal law also protects LGBT and intersex people in the Northern Territory in the form of the Sex Discrimination Amendment (Sexual Orientation, Gender Identity and Intersex Status) Act 2013. In March 2025, it was announced by the ABC News media that NT discrimination legislation by the government would be rolled back and watered down to remove any hate-speech provisions that “could potentially jail individuals for telling a joke”. In July 2025, a bill was introduced to repeal and reverse the 2022 laws that were implemented, however no vote is planned for several months and possibly has to go to a legal committee.

The Law Reform (Gender, Sexuality and De Facto Relationships) Act 2003 helped remove legislative discrimination against same-sex couples in all areas of territory law – with the exception of same-sex adoption which was eventually legislatively enacted in April 2018. The Act removed distinctions based on a person's gender, sexuality or de facto relationship in approximately 50 acts and regulations.

== Transgender rights ==
Since December 2025, a “policy decree directive” by the NT government banned any gender-affirming healthcare for children and minors effective immediately. Queensland implemented a very similar policy recently.

Since October 2025, NT prisons implemented a housing a prisoner quarters policy - based “only on the biological sex an individual was born as on their birth certificate, by a CLP regulation directive allowance within the corrections department”.

Transgender individuals are entitled to have their name and birth certificate amended to reflect their gender identity and transgender status.

Following the federal legalisation of same-sex marriage in December 2017, the Northern Territory followed several other states and territories in updating their laws relating to transgender people. On 29 November 2018, the Parliament passed a bill that removed the requirement for one to be unmarried before being able to apply to legally change their gender. In addition, the bill removed the requirement for sex reassignment surgery, however requires “appropriate clinical treatment” to be carried out before a person's gender on their birth certificate can be amended, and also allows an option for a non-gender specific descriptor ("X") to be registered on a certificate. The removal of the surgery requirement was opposed by radical feminist Anna Kerr from the Feminist Legal Clinic due to the risk that it could be used for "nefarious purposes" by some men. On the opposing side, Transgender Victoria executive director Sally Goldner argued the change would help remote indigenous transgender people (sistergirls and brotherboys), who lacked access to medical facilities. The change was also supported by the territory's anti-discrimination commissioner, who suggested it should have gone further and moved from a medicalised model (where a clinician's involvement is still required) to a self-identification approach to gender. The bill received royal assent on 5 December 2018 and commenced the following day.

Access to trans-related healthcare services is limited in the Northern Territory, with transgender children's families generally travelling interstate to access services. The territory has been criticised by transgender advocates for placing transgender women in men's prisons, increasing the risk of rape, murder and suicide.

== Intersex rights ==
In March 2017, representatives of Androgen Insensitivity Syndrome Support Group Australia and Organisation Intersex International Australia participated in an Australian and Aotearoa/New Zealand consensus "Darlington Statement" by intersex community organizations and others. The statement calls for legal reform, including the criminalization of deferrable intersex medical interventions on children, an end to legal classification of sex, and improved access to peer support.

Besides male and female, Northern Territory birth certificates and identification documents are available with an "X" sex descriptor.

== Summary table ==
Same-sex sexual activity legal	Yes (Since 1983 for men; always for women)
Equal age of consent	Yes (Since 2004)
Anti-discrimination and anti-vilification legislation implemented - that explicitly includes sexual orientation, gender identity and sex characteristics	Yes (Since 2022)
Banning surgeries and medical procedures on intersex individuals	No
Gender-affirming healthcare available to children and minors	No
Hate crime laws includes both sexual orientation and gender identity	No / Yes (Federal law since 2025, no territory laws on hate crimes)
Same-sex marriages	Yes (Since 2017)
Recognition in territory law of same-sex couples as de facto couples	Yes (Since 2004)
Full joint/step adoption as well as full parentage from both IVF and altruistic surrogacy procedures for same-sex couples	Yes
Gay sex criminal records expunged	Yes (Since 2018)
Gay panic defence abolished	Yes
Conversion therapy on minors outlawed	No
Right to change legal gender without sex reassignment surgery, but requires appropriate clinical treatment	Yes (Since 2018)
MSMs allowed to donate blood	Yes (Since 2026 - must be monogamous as a condition)

== See also ==
- LGBT rights in South Australia
- Transgender rights in Australia
- Intersex rights in Australia
- LGBTQ rights in Australia
- Australian Marriage Law Postal Survey
- Same-sex marriage in Australia
