= Same-sex marriage in Australia =

Same-sex marriage has been legal in Australia since 9 December 2017. Legislation permitting same-sex marriage, the Marriage Amendment (Definition and Religious Freedoms) Act 2017, became law on 8 December 2017 and came into effect the next day. This immediately recognised overseas same-sex marriages. The first same-sex wedding under Australian law was held on 15 December 2017. (Note: In Australia, couples intending to marry must wait at least one month after signing a notice of intention to marry, meaning the first legal weddings were to take place from 9 January 2018. However, several same-sex couples successfully applied for an exemption from the waiting period.) The passage of the law followed a voluntary postal survey of all Australians, in which 61.6% of respondents supported the legalisation of same-sex marriage. Australia was the second country in Oceania, after New Zealand, and the 23rd in the world to allow same-sex couples to marry nationwide. Prior to legalisation, 22 bills to allow same-sex marriage were introduced to Parliament between September 2004 and May 2017. These failed attempts came after the Howard government amended the Marriage Act 1961 in 2004 to codify the then-exclusively heterosexual common law definition of marriage. The Australian Capital Territory passed a same-sex marriage law in December 2013 that was struck down by the High Court for inconsistency with federal law.

Other types of recognition for same-sex couples are also available. Under federal law, same-sex couples can also be recognised as de facto relationships. De facto couples have most of the same rights and responsibilities afforded to married couples, although these rights may be difficult to assert and are not always recognised in practice. Although there is no national civil union or relationship register scheme in Australia, most states and territories have legislated for civil unions or domestic partnership registries. Registered unions are recognised as de facto relationships under federal law.

== De facto relationships ==
De facto relationships, defined in the federal Family Law Act 1975, are available to both same-sex and opposite-sex couples. De facto relationships provide couples who live together on a genuine domestic basis with many of the same rights and benefits as married couples. Two people can become a de facto couple by entering into a registered relationship (i.e. a civil union or domestic partnership) or by being assessed as a de facto couple by the Federal Circuit and Family Court. Couples who live together are generally recognised as a de facto relationship, even if they have not registered or officially documented their relationship.

=== Rudd government 2008–2009 reforms ===
Following the Human Rights and Equal Opportunity Commission's (HREOC) 2007 report titled "Same-Sex: Same Entitlements", and an audit of federal legislation, the Rudd government introduced in 2008 several reforms designed to equalise treatment for same-sex couples and same-sex families. The reforms eliminated discrimination against same-sex couples and their children in a wide range of areas. They came in the form of two pieces of legislation, the Same-Sex Relationships (Equal Treatment in Commonwealth Laws—General Law Reform) Act 2008 and the Same-Sex Relationships (Equal Treatment in Commonwealth Laws—Superannuation) Act 2008. These laws, which passed the Parliament in November 2008, amended 70 existing Commonwealth acts to equalise treatment for same-sex couples and their children.

As a result of these reforms, same-sex couples were treated equally with heterosexual couples in most areas of federal law for the first time. For instance, with relation to social security and general family law, same-sex couples were previously not recognised as a couple for social security or family assistance purposes. A person who had a same-sex de facto partner was treated as a single person. The reforms ensured that same-sex couples were, for the first time under Australian law, recognised as a couple akin to opposite-sex partners. Consequently, a same-sex couple receives the same rate of social security and family assistance payments as an opposite-sex couple.

=== Legislative history prior to de facto recognition ===
In 2004, the Superannuation Industry (Supervision) Act 1993 was amended to allow tax free payment of superannuation benefits to be made to the surviving partner in an interdependent relationship, including same-sex couples, or a relationship where one person was financially dependent on another person. Prior to 2008, same-sex couples were only recognised by the Commonwealth Government in very limited circumstances. For example, since the 1990s, same-sex foreign partners of Australian citizens have been able to receive residence permits in Australia known as "interdependency visas". Following a national inquiry into financial and work-related discrimination against same-sex relationships, the HREOC released its Same-Sex: Same Entitlements report on 21 June 2007. The Commission identified 58 Commonwealth law statutes and provisions that explicitly discriminated against same-sex couples by using the term "member of the opposite sex". The previous conservative Howard government had banned its departments from making submissions to the HREOC inquiry regarding financial discrimination experienced by same-sex couples.

The report found that 100 statutes and provisions under federal law discriminated against same-sex couples by using the term "member of the opposite sex", from aged care, superannuation, childcare, Medicare (including the Pharmaceutical Benefits Scheme) through to pensions. "All the basics that opposite-gender couples are legally entitled to and take for granted" were things same-sex couples were effectively barred from utilising under the former system.

=== Differences between de facto relationships and marriages ===
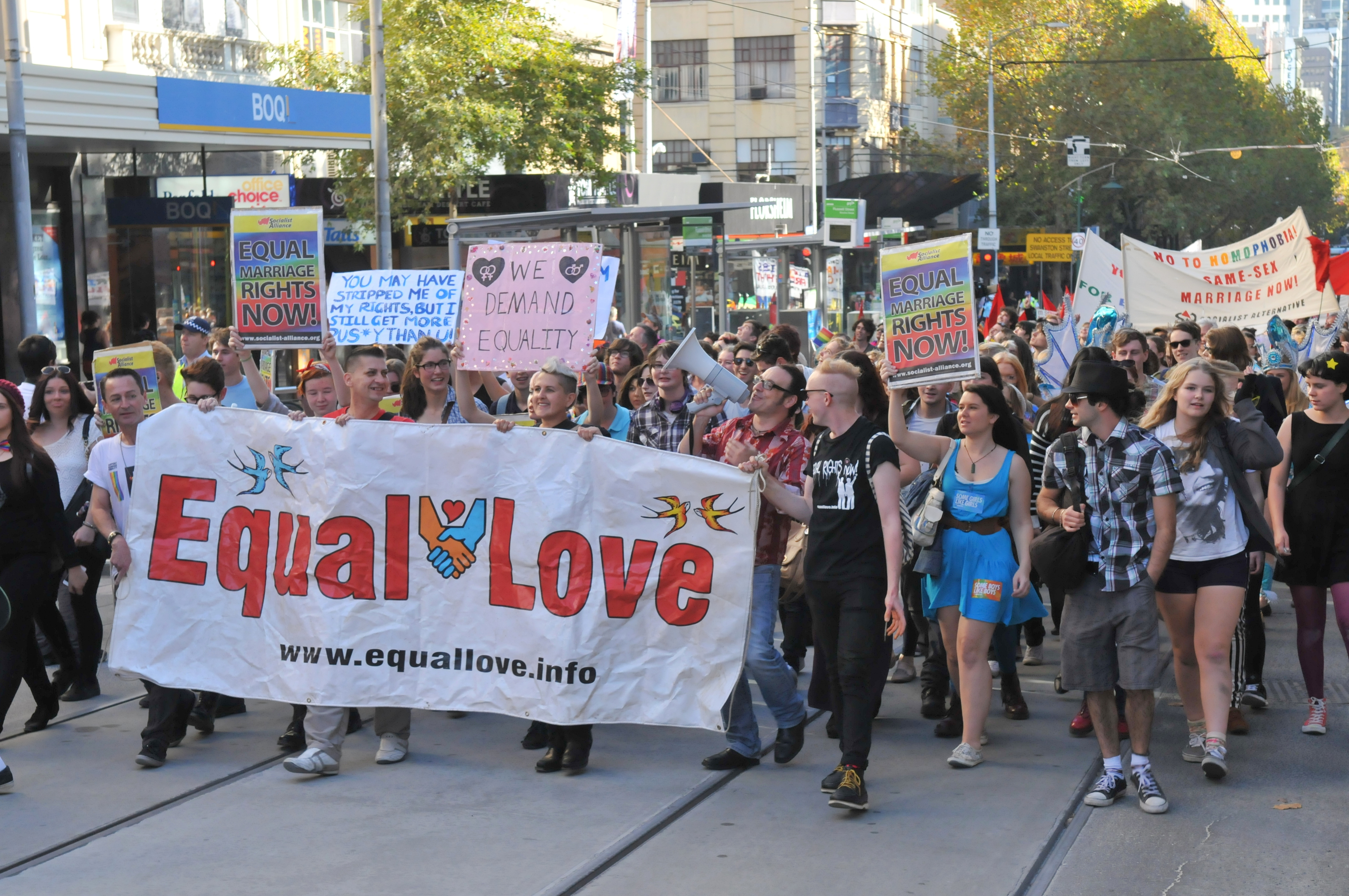
Equal Love rally in Melbourne in 2013

Some legal differences remain with respect to treatment of couples in a de facto relationship and couples in a marriage. Differences exist between the rights of a de facto couple and a married couple in relation to family law matters, including property settlements and entitlements to spousal maintenance. A de facto relationship must have ended for the court to make an order for property settlement or spousal maintenance, though this requirement does not exist for married couples. For a de facto partner to seek an order for property settlement, the court must be satisfied of at least one of the following:

- The period of the de facto relationship was for at least two years; or
- There is a child in the de facto relationship; or
- The relationship is or was registered under a prescribed law of a State or Territory; or
- That failure to make an order would result in serious injustice due to the significant contributions made by one party.

By way of comparison, for a married couple, it is enough merely to have been married to attract the jurisdiction of the court for property and spousal maintenance. Furthermore, it is possible that an individual in a de facto relationship can be treated substantively different to a person in a marriage. In the event of an unexpected end to a de facto relationship (such as the death of a partner), the surviving partner must often prove the existence of a relationship in order to be registered as the next of kin on a death certificate and receive government bereavement payments and access to a partner's superannuation. These requirements vary on a state by state basis. Given that, prior to the legalisation of same-sex marriage, same-sex couples did not have the option to marry, as heterosexual couples did, these discrepancies could have a particularly discriminatory impact on same-sex couples. The rights of a de facto partner may be poorly understood by government departments, resulting in occasions where said couples have not had their rights upheld. De facto relationships also often face an onerous burden of proof before rights that are automatically granted to married couples can be accessed. This means partners may have to provide evidence about their living and childcare arrangements, sexual relationship, finances, ownership of property, commitment to a shared life and how they present as a couple in public. This can present difficulties when de facto relationships are legally contested by other people, usually other family members. Marriages rarely encounter such difficulties as they are generally regarded as immediate and incontrovertible.

In April 2014, a federal court judge ruled that a heterosexual couple who had a child and lived together for 13 years were not in a de facto relationship and thus the court had no jurisdiction to divide up their property under family law following a request for separation. In his ruling, the judge stated that "de facto relationship(s) may be described as 'marriage-like' but it is not a marriage and has significant differences socially, financially and emotionally."

== Same-sex marriage ==
Recognition of same-sex relationships in Oceania Marriage Marriages performed elsewhere are recognized (American Samoa) No recognition of same-sex couples Constitution limits marriage to opposite-sex couples (Palau, Tuvalu) Same-sex sexual activity illegal, but criminalisation not enforced Same-sex sexual activity illegal (Country names will appear with mouse-overs when map is viewed at full size. Encircling lines are the exclusive economic zones of each state.)

=== Background and summary ===
The federal Marriage Act 1961 governs marriage in Australia. It did not explicitly define the legal meaning of the word "marriage" prior to 2004. Section 46(1) of the Act, however, has always included a provision requiring celebrants to state the legal nature of marriage in Australia. Prior to the legalisation of same-sex marriage, the requirement was to state marriage is the union of "a man and a woman", or words to that effect, in line with the 1866 English case of Hyde v Hyde. The words in section 46(1) have been seen as a description or exhortation rather than a legal definition.

In August 2004, the Howard government introduced a bill to insert a definition of marriage in the interpretation section (section 5) of the Act; as "the union of a man and a woman to the exclusion of all others, voluntarily entered into for life". The bill also inserted a new provision in the Act (section 88EA) which stipulated any foreign marriages of same-sex couples "must not be recognised as a marriage in Australia". The bill was supported by the opposition Labor Party and came amidst increased public debate on the issue following the judicial legalisation of same-sex marriage in Massachusetts and Canada. Prime Minister John Howard later stated that the amendments were partially motivated by a desire to prevent same-sex couples from having their marriages recognised by the courts, as was being litigated at the time. Additional amendments to the Family Law Act 1975 prevented same-sex couples from adopting children in inter-country adoption arrangements, although these restrictions were eventually relaxed in 2014. The bill passed the Parliament on 13 August 2004 and went into effect on the day it received royal assent by Governor-General Michael Jeffery, 16 August 2004.

Between 2004 and 2017, there were 22 unsuccessful bills to legalise same-sex marriage in the Parliament. Labor governments of Kevin Rudd and Julia Gillard between 2007 and 2013 were divided on the issue. Despite passing a resolution at the party's national conference in December 2011 to support same-sex marriage, the party held a conscience vote when two private member's bills to legalise same-sex marriage were debated in the Parliament in September 2012. The legislation was opposed by Prime Minister Julia Gillard and several other Labor MPs, as well as by the opposition Coalition, led by Tony Abbott. The first bill failed in the House of Representatives by 42 votes to 98 and a similar bill was rejected by the Senate by 26 votes to 41.

Same-sex marriage caused significant tension within the Abbott government. It resolved in August 2015 to hold a national vote on same-sex marriage sometime after the 2016 federal election, in the form of either a plebiscite or a constitutional referendum. This policy was maintained by the Turnbull government after Malcolm Turnbull (a supporter of same-sex marriage) replaced Abbott as prime minister following a leadership challenge. A bill providing for the plebiscite (which would have been held on 11 February 2017) passed the House of Representatives by 76 votes to 67 on 20 October 2016, but was rejected by the Senate on 7 November 2016 by 29 votes to 33, as the government had failed to attract the support of the opposition Labor Party, the Greens and several Senate crossbenchers, who demanded that same-sex marriage be legalised through a parliamentary vote. Despite initially suggesting the government had "no plans to take any other measures on this issue", Prime Minister Turnbull came under increasing pressure to change policy and allow a conscience vote in the Parliament. By August 2017, several Liberal Party MPs stated they would consider crossing the floor to suspend standing orders and force debate on same-sex marriage legislation against the government's wishes. Consequently, at a Liberal party room meeting on 7 August 2017, the government resolved to conduct a voluntary postal survey on the matter later in the year. The government stated the survey would only occur in the event the Senate again rejected the legislation enabling the plebiscite, which it did on 9 August 2017. On 9 August 2017, the government directed the Australian Statistician to conduct a survey of all enrolled voters to measure support for same-sex marriage. The direction was given to bypass the need for the Parliament to approve a plebiscite. The direction was legally challenged, but was upheld by the High Court. The survey was held between 12 September and 7 November 2017 and returned a 61.6% vote in favour of same-sex marriage. The government responded by confirming it would facilitate the passage of a private member's bill legalising same-sex marriage before the end of the year.

Same-sex marriage in Australia
- Should the law be changed to allow same-sex couples to marry?

Results
Choice	Votes	%
Yes	7,817,247	61.60%
No	4,873,987	38.40%
Valid votes	12,691,234	99.71%
Invalid or blank votes	36,686	0.29%
Total votes	12,727,920	100.00%
Registered voters/turnout	16,006,180	79.52%

The Marriage Amendment (Definition and Religious Freedoms) Act 2017 was introduced by openly gay Liberal Party backbencher, Senator Dean Smith. The bill amended section 5 of the Marriage Act to define marriage in Australia as the union of "2 people". It also removed the ban on overseas same-sex marriages being recognised in Australia, including ones that occurred before the law change. Additionally, the bill included protections for religious celebrants, ministers of religion and bodies established for a religious purpose, to not be obligated to perform or provide services and facilities to marriages they object to. The bill passed the Senate by 43 votes to 12 on 29 November 2017 and passed the House of Representatives on 7 December 2017 by a vote of 128 to 4 with 15 abstentions. The bill received royal assent on 8 December 2017 and went into effect the following day. Same-sex marriages lawfully entered into overseas automatically became recognised from that date, and the first weddings after the normal one-month waiting period occurred on 9 January 2018. Several same-sex couples successfully applied for an exemption from the one-month waiting period, and the first legal same-sex wedding under Australian law was held on 15 December 2017 for Jill Kindt and Jo Grant in the Sunshine Coast, with further weddings taking place the following day.

=== Marriage Act 1961 ===
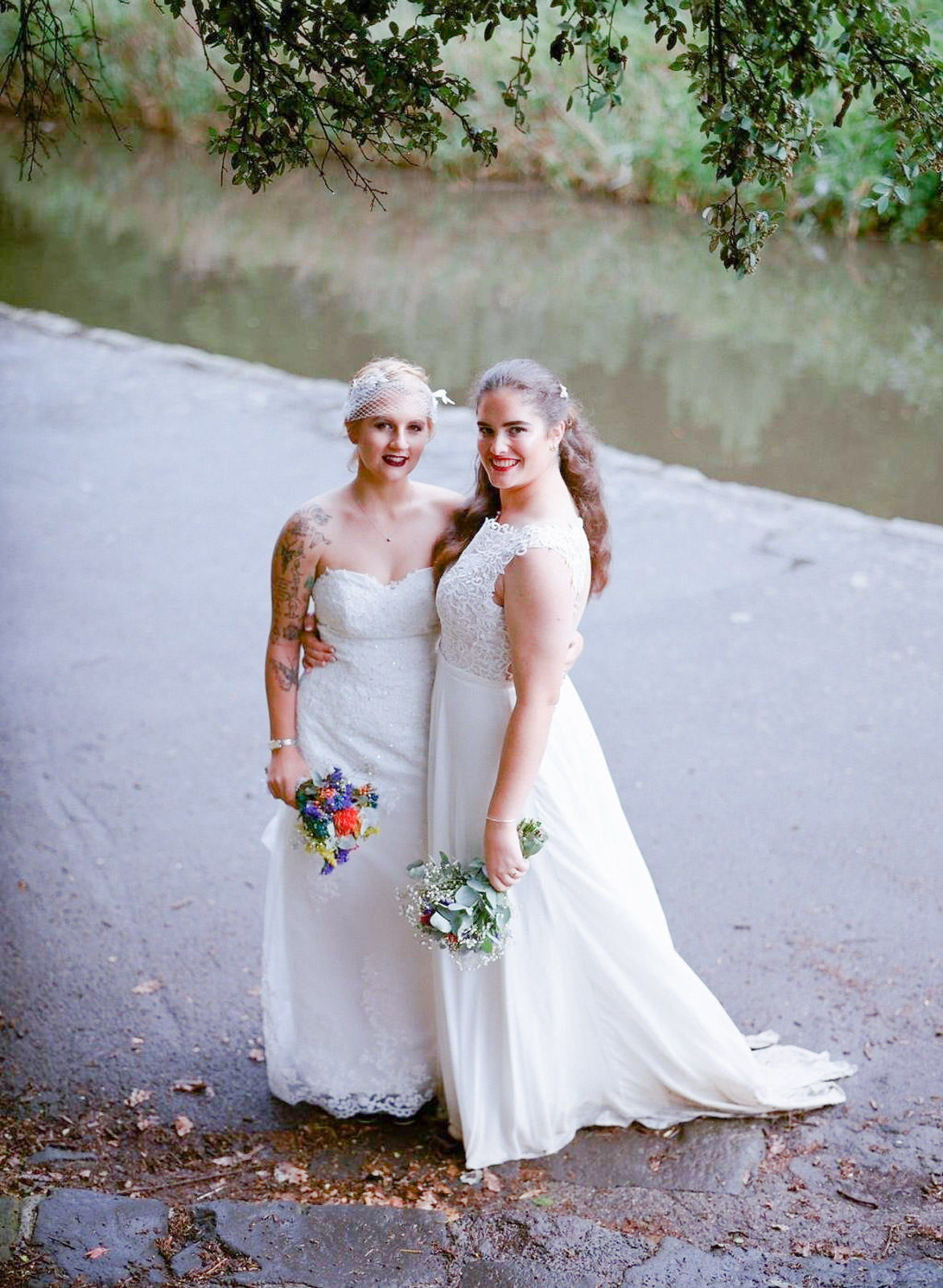
A newlywed couple poses for pictures after their marriage in Melbourne, 2018

==== 2004 amendments ====
On 27 May 2004, Attorney-General Philip Ruddock introduced a bill, intending to incorporate the-then common law definition of marriage into the Marriage Act 1961. In June 2004, the bill passed the House of Representatives, and the Senate passed the amendment by 38 votes to 6 on 13 August 2004. The bill subsequently received royal assent from Governor-General Michael Jeffery, becoming the Marriage Amendment Act 2004. The amendment specified that marriage meant "the union of a man and a woman to the exclusion of all others, voluntarily entered into for life." In addition, the bill banned the recognition of same-sex marriages entered into in other jurisdictions. Attorney-General Ruddock and other Liberals argued that the bill was necessary to protect the institution of marriage, by ensuring that the common law definition was put beyond legal challenge. Labor Shadow Attorney-General Nicola Roxon on the same day the amendment was proposed said that the party would not oppose the amendment, arguing that it did not affect the legal situation of same-sex relationships, merely putting into statute law what was already common law. The Family First senator supported the bill.

Despite having the support of the major parties, the bill was contested by sections of the community, human rights groups and some minor political parties. The Greens opposed the bill, calling it the "Marriage Discrimination Act". The Australian Democrats also opposed the bill. Democrat Senator Andrew Bartlett stated that the legislation devalues his marriage, and Greens Senator Bob Brown (himself openly gay) referred to John Howard and the legislation as "hate[ful]". Brown was asked to retract his statements, but refused. Bob Brown additionally described Australia as having a "straight Australia policy", in reference to the 1901 immigration policy of a similar name. Not all Labor members were in support of the bill. During the bill's second reading, Anthony Albanese, Labor MP for Grayndler, said, "what has caused offence is why the Government has rushed in this legislation in what is possibly the last fortnight of parliamentary sittings. This bill is a result of 30 bigoted backbenchers who want to press buttons out there in the community."

==== 2017 amendments ====
Senator Dean Smith introduced to Parliament a private senator's bill to alter the definition of marriage to allow same-sex couples to marry, after 61.6% of Australians who responded in the Australian Marriage Law Postal Survey voted to support same-sex marriage. The bill amended the definition of "marriage" in the Act, omitting the words "man and a woman" and replacing them with the gender-neutral wording "2 people". The amendment which prevented overseas same-sex marriages from being recognised in Australia was repealed. The bill passed the Senate by 43 votes to 12 on 29 November, and passed the House of Representatives by 128 votes to 4 on 7 December 2017.

29 November 2017 vote in the Senate
Party	Voted for	Voted against	Abstained	Absent (Did not vote)
Australian Labor Party	15: Carol Brown; Catryna Bilyk; Doug Cameron; Kim Carr; Anthony Chisholm; Kimberley Kitching; Sue Lines; Jenny McAllister; Malarndirri McCarthy; Claire Moore; Louise Pratt; Lisa Singh; Anne Urquhart; Murray Watt; Penny Wong	2: Chris Ketter; Helen Polley	9: Jacinta Collins; Sam Dastyari; Pat Dodson; Don Farrell; Alex Gallacher; Katy Gallagher; Gavin Marshall; Deborah O'Neill; Glenn Sterle	–
G Liberal Party of Australia	12: Simon Birmingham; David Bushby; Mathias Cormann; Jonathon Duniam; Mitch Fifield; Anne Ruston; James Paterson; Jane Hume; Marise Payne; Linda Reynolds; Scott Ryan; Dean Smith	3: Concetta Fierravanti-Wells; Eric Abetz; Slade Brockman	4: Michaelia Cash; David Fawcett; Zed Seselja; Arthur Sinodinos	–
Australian Greens	9: Andrew Bartlett; Richard Di Natale; Sarah Hanson-Young; Nick McKim; Lee Rhiannon; Janet Rice; Jordon Steele-John; Rachel Siewert; Peter Whish-Wilson	–	–	–
G Liberal National Party of Queensland	2: George Brandis; Ian Macdonald	2: Matt Canavan; Barry O'Sullivan	1: James McGrath	–
Pauline Hanson's One Nation	–	1: Brian Burston	2: Pauline Hanson; Peter Georgiou	–
G National Party of Australia	–	1: John Williams	1: Bridget McKenzie	–
Nick Xenophon Team	2: Stirling Griff; Rex Patrick	–	–	–
Australian Conservatives	–	1: Cory Bernardi	–	–
G Country Liberal Party	1: Nigel Scullion	–	–	–
Derryn Hinch's Justice Party	1: Derryn Hinch	–	–	–
Liberal Democratic Party	1: David Leyonhjelm	–	–	–
Independent	–	2: Lucy Gichuhi; Fraser Anning	–	–
Total (Note: There were 4 vacancies in the Senate at the time of the vote due to the ongoing parliamentary eligibility crisis.)	43	12	17	0
Total	59.7%	16.7%	23.6%	0.0%

7 December 2017 vote in the House of Representatives
Party	Voted for	Voted against	Abstained	Absent (Did not vote)
Australian Labor Party	66: Anthony Albanese; Anne Aly; Sharon Bird; Chris Bowen; Gai Brodtmann; Tony Burke; Linda Burney; Mark Butler; Terri Butler; Jim Chalmers; Nick Champion; Lisa Chesters; Jason Clare; Sharon Claydon; Julie Collins; Pat Conroy; Michael Danby; Milton Dick; Mark Dreyfus; Justine Elliot; Kate Ellis; David Feeney; Joel Fitzgibbon; Mike Freelander; Steve Georganas; Andrew Giles; Luke Gosling; Tim Hammond; Ross Hart; Chris Hayes; Julian Hill; Emma Husar; Ed Husic; Stephen Jones; Justine Keay; Mike Kelly; Matt Keogh; Peter Khalil; Catherine King; Madeleine King; Susan Lamb; Andrew Leigh; Jenny Macklin; Richard Marles; Emma McBride; Brian Mitchell; Rob Mitchell; Shayne Neumann; Clare O'Neil; Cathy O'Toole; Julie Owens; Graham Perrett; Tanya Plibersek; Amanda Rishworth; Michelle Rowland; Joanne Ryan; Bill Shorten; Warren Snowdon; Anne Stanley; Meryl Swanson; Susan Templeman; Matt Thistlethwaite; Maria Vamvakinou; Tim Watts; Josh Wilson; Tony Zappia	–	2: Anthony Byrne; Brendan O'Connor	1: Wayne Swan
G Liberal Party of Australia	35: Julia Banks; Julie Bishop; David Coleman; Chris Crewther; Jason Falinski; Paul Fletcher; Nicolle Flint; Josh Frydenberg; Ian Goodenough; Sarah Henderson; Greg Hunt; Steve Irons; Michael Keenan; Craig Kelly; Craig Laundy; Julian Leeser; Sussan Ley; Nola Marino; Ben Morton; Kelly O'Dwyer; Tony Pasin; Christian Porter; Melissa Price; Christopher Pyne; Rowan Ramsey; Ann Sudmalis; Angus Taylor; Dan Tehan; Alan Tudge; Malcolm Turnbull; Lucy Wicks; Tim Wilson; Jason Wood; Ken Wyatt; Trent Zimmerman	1: Russell Broadbent	7: Tony Abbott; Kevin Andrews; Andrew Hastie; Alex Hawke; Scott Morrison; Michael Sukkar; Rick Wilson	–
G Liberal National Party of Queensland	15: Karen Andrews; Scott Buchholz; Steven Ciobo; Peter Dutton; Warren Entsch; Trevor Evans; Andrew Laming; Michelle Landry; John McVeigh; Llew O'Brien; Ted O'Brien; Ken O'Dowd; Jane Prentice; Ross Vasta; Andrew Wallace	2: David Littleproud; Keith Pitt	4: George Christensen; Luke Howarth; Stuart Robert; Bert van Manen	–
G National Party of Australia	8: Andrew Broad; Darren Chester; Mark Coulton; Damian Drum; Andrew Gee; Luke Hartsuyker; Kevin Hogan; Michael McCormack	–	2: David Gillespie; Barnaby Joyce	–
Australian Greens	1: Adam Bandt	–	–	–
Katter's Australian Party	–	1: Bob Katter	–	–
Nick Xenophon Team	1: Rebekha Sharkie	–	–	–
Independent	2: Cathy McGowan; Andrew Wilkie	–	–	–
Total (Note: The Speaker of the House of Representatives, Tony Smith, votes only in case of a tied vote. In addition, the seat of Bennelong was vacant at the time due to John Alexander's resignation.)	128	4	15	1
Total	86.5%	2.7%	10.1%	0.7%

The bill received royal assent from Governor-General Peter Cosgrove on 8 December 2017 and came into effect the following day. As a result of the law, the definition of marriage in Australia is now "the union of 2 people to the exclusion of all others, voluntarily entered into for life." Under section 46 of the Marriage Act 1961, a celebrant is required to say these words, or words to this effect, in every marriage ceremony.

As of 2026, Australian Christians and the Family First Party support repealing the same-sex marriage law.

=== State and territory laws ===
The federal legalisation of same-sex marriage extended to all of Australia's states and territories, including its external territories. States and territories have long had the ability to create laws with respect to relationships, though Section 51(xxi) of the Constitution of Australia prescribes that marriage is a legislative power of the Parliament.

Since the Parliament introduced the Marriage Act 1961, marriage laws in Australia were generally regarded as an exclusive Commonwealth power. The precise rights of states and territories with respect to creating state-based same-sex marriage laws was complicated further by the Howard government amendment to the Marriage Act in 2004 to define marriage as the exclusive "union of one man and one woman, to the exclusion of all others". The Australian Capital Territory (ACT) provided a test case on the matter, when in October 2013, its Legislative Assembly passed a law allowing same-sex marriage. On 13 September 2013, the Australian Capital Territory Government had announced that it would introduce a bill to legalise same-sex marriage, following a decade-long attempt to legislate in the area. "We've been pretty clear on this issue for some time now and there's overwhelming community support for this", Chief Minister Katy Gallagher said. "We would prefer to see the federal parliament legislate for a nationally consistent scheme, but in the absence of this, we will act for the people of the ACT." The bill would have enabled couples unable to marry under the Marriage Act 1961 to enter into marriage in the ACT, and would have provided for solemnisation, eligibility, dissolution and annulment, regulatory requirements and notice of intention in relation to same-sex marriages. On 10 October 2013, Attorney-General George Brandis confirmed that the Commonwealth Government would challenge the proposed ACT bill, stating that it had significant constitutional concerns with respect to the bill. The bill was debated in the Legislative Assembly on 22 October 2013, and passed by 9 votes to 8. Under the legislation, known as the Marriage Equality (Same Sex) Act 2013, same-sex marriages were legally permitted from 7 December 2013.

The Abbott government immediately challenged the law in the High Court of Australia. The High Court ruled on the matter on 12 December 2013, five days after the first same-sex weddings were celebrated in the ACT, striking down the ACT's same-sex marriage law. The court determined that all laws with respect to marriage were an exclusive power of the Commonwealth and that no state or territory law creating any other type of marriage could operate concurrently with the federal Marriage Act; "the kind of marriage provided for by the [Marriage] Act is the only kind of marriage that may be formed or recognised in Australia". The court found that the ACT act was invalid and of "no effect", because it was "inconsistent", in terms of the Australian Capital Territory Self-Government Act 1988, and the federal Marriage Act 1961. It was inconsistent both because its definition of marriage conflicted with that in the federal act and because the federal act was exclusive, leaving no room for any other definition in the legislation of a state or a territory. However, the court went on to determine that the word "marriage" in Section 51(xxi) of the Constitution means "a consensual union formed between natural persons in accordance with legally prescribed requirements" where that union is "intended to endure and be terminable only in accordance with law" and "accords a status affecting and defining mutual rights and obligations". Therefore, it included same-sex marriage thus clarifying that there is no constitutional impediment to the Commonwealth legislating for same-sex marriage in the future and as such that a same-sex marriage law passed by the Parliament could operate lawfully. The ruling closed off the possibility for a state or territory to legislate for same-sex marriage in the absence of a federal same-sex marriage law.

Prior to that ruling, reports released by the New South Wales Parliamentary Committee on Social Issues and the Tasmanian Law Reform Institute found that a state parliament "has the power to legislate on the topic of marriage, including same-sex marriage. However, if [New South Wales] chooses to exercise that power and enact a law for same-sex marriage, the law could be subject to challenge in the High Court of Australia", and that no current arguments "present an absolute impediment to achieving state-based or Commonwealth marriage equality". The ACT Government received legal advice supporting the lawfulness of its same-sex marriage law prior to the High Court ruling, though several legal experts expressed doubts. Aside from the Australian Capital Territory, Tasmania is the only other state or territory to have passed same-sex marriage legislation in a chamber of its legislature. The Tasmanian House of Assembly passed same-sex marriage legislation by 13 votes to 11 in September 2012, though the Legislative Council subsequently voted against the legislation a few weeks later by 6 votes to 8. Both chambers later passed motions giving in-principle, symbolic support for same-sex marriage.

Prior to the federal legalisation of same-sex marriage, six Australian jurisdictions (Tasmania, the Australian Capital Territory, New South Wales, Queensland, Victoria and South Australia), comprising 90% of Australia's population, recognised same-sex marriages and civil partnerships performed overseas, providing automatic recognition of such unions in their respective state registers.

=== Constitutional and legal issues ===
There is an important difference in the source of power of the Commonwealth to legislate over married and de facto relationships. Marriage and "matrimonial causes" are supported by sections 51(xxi) and (xxii) of the Constitution. The legal status of marriage is also internationally recognised whereas the power to legislate for de facto relationships and their financial matters relies on referrals by states to the Commonwealth in accordance with Section 51(xxxvii) of the Australian Constitution, where it states the law shall extend only to states by whose parliaments the matter is referred, or which afterward adopt the law.

=== Transgender and intersex issues ===
In the 2001 case of Re Kevin – validity of marriage of transsexual, the Family Court of Australia recognised the right of transsexual people to marry according to their current gender as opposed to their sex assigned at birth; this did not permit same-sex marriage from the perspective of the genders the prospective partners identified as, but it did mean that a transgender woman could legally marry a cisgender man, and a transgender man could legally marry a cisgender woman.

In October 2007, the Administrative Appeals Tribunal overturned a decision by the Foreign Affairs Department refusing to issue a transgender woman a passport listing her as female because she was married to a woman. The tribunal ordered that she be issued a passport listing her as female, in accordance with her other official documents, thereby recognising the existence of a marriage between two persons legally recognised as female. Same-sex marriage advocates noted that same-sex marriage legislation should be inclusive of the rights of transgender and intersex people, with intersex people being sceptical of the term same-sex marriage. These concerns were addressed by the federal legalisation of same-sex marriage in December 2017, which amended the definition of marriage to "2 people".

As of 2017, only South Australia and the Australian Capital Territory did not require transgender people to divorce before registering an official change of gender on a birth certificate. This requirement was removed by federal law in December 2018. Victoria passed legislation removing the forced divorce requirement in May 2018, and similar legislation was passed in New South Wales and Queensland the following month. The Northern Territory passed similar laws in November 2018, and it was followed by Western Australia in February 2019. Tasmania was the last jurisdiction to reform its laws. The state passed legislation removing the forced divorce requirement in April 2019, and it joined some of the other states and territories in also removing the requirement for a person to have undergone sex reassignment surgery prior to having a change of sex recognised on a birth certificate.

=== Indigenous Australians ===
While many Indigenous Australian cultures historically practiced polygamy, there are no records of same-sex marriages being performed in these cultures in the way they are commonly defined in Western legal systems. However, many Indigenous communities recognize identities and relationships that may be placed on the LGBT spectrum. For instance, the Arrernte traditionally adhered to a "boy bride" custom whereby many young men, usually younger than 14 years of age, would be given to older adult men. The relationship was understood to include some sexual relations between both men, usually only masturbation, as well as sleeping, hunting and eating together. At puberty, the younger partner would undergo a series of ceremonies into adulthood, and the "boy bride" relationship would end. The Arrernte also recognise people fulfilling a third gender role, known as kwarte kwarte (pronounced [ˈkʷaʈə ˈkʷaʈə]). Similar cultural third gender roles exist among the Warlpiri as karnta-piya (pronounced [ˈkaɳdapi.ja]), the Pitjantjatjara as kungka kungka (pronounced [ˈkʊŋkɐ ˈkʊŋkɐ]), the Pintupi as kungka wati (pronounced [ˈkuŋka ˈwati], the Warumungu as girriji karrti, and the Wiradjuri as yamadi. The Tiwi similarly recognise formal structures and roles for the murrulawamini, often translated in English as "sistergirls".

In 2015, a group of Aboriginal elders delivered a petition to the Parliament House called the "Uluru Bark Petition", which opposed same-sex marriage and described it as "an affront to the Aboriginal people of Australia". The petition also stated that "all Aboriginal people oppose changing the definition of marriage to allow same-sex couples to wed". Aboriginal writer Dameyon Boyson widely criticised the petition, saying, "The Uluru Bark Petition misrepresents Aboriginal culture, and that it's only the voice of a few leaders excessively influenced by white man's religion and influence. Behind these authentic faces that you see holding up these pieces of bark and standing in front of Parliament House you will find the mechanics of white influence." A Darumbal Aboriginal who was asked to comment by the National Indigenous Television said, "Colonisation and Christianity ha[ve] pretty much shaped Indigenous culture today. In particular, it has hidden the voices of Indigenous lesbians and gays, and downplayed the importance of their relationships in traditional culture." During the marriage postal survey, about 50 survey forms were burned by local community members in Ramingining because they thought that "it meant a man should be 'compelled' to marry another man". Indigenous activists also worried that survey forms would not be understood in remote Aboriginal communities as locals are not always fluent in English or "familiar with the process". A 2018 article from the Australian Institute of Family Studies showed that support for equal rights did not vary significantly between Indigenous and non-Indigenous Australians.

=== Statistics ===
According to the Australian Bureau of Statistics, approximately 4% of all marriages officiated in Australia between 2018 and 2025 were marriages of same-sex couples. The data for the year 2018 indicated that the overwhelming majority of same-sex weddings were administered by a civil celebrant, and that the median age of same-sex couples entering into marriages was notably older than that of heterosexual couples. The figures for 2018–2021 do not include any marriages where one or both of the parties do not identify as either male or female. Figures for 2020 and 2021 are also much lower than previous years because of the restrictions in place due to the COVID-19 pandemic.

Number of marriages performed in Australia
Year	Same-sex marriages			Marriages including a person of non-binary gender	Total marriages	% same-sex
Year	Female	Male	Total	Marriages including a person of non-binary gender	Total marriages	% same-sex
2018	3,781	2,757	6,538	—N/a	119,188	5.5%
2019	3,243	2,262	5,505	—N/a	113,815	4.8%
2020	1,782	1,117	2,899	—N/a	78,987	3.7%
2021	1,771	1,072	2,843	—N/a	89,167	3.2%
2022	2,667	1,767	4,434	159	127,161	3.5%
2023	2,619	1,735	4,354	204	118,439	3.7%
2024	2,622	1,893	4,515	231	120,844	3.7%
2025	2,527	1,849	4,376	260	118,804	3.9%

Dual British-Australian couples have been able to marry in British diplomatic missions in Australia since the United Kingdom legalised same-sex marriage in 2014. The first couple to marry were Peter Fraser and Gordon Stevenson on 27 June 2014 at the British consulate in Sydney. From June 2014 to October 2017, 445 same-sex couples married in British diplomatic offices across Australia.

=== Religious performance ===
Most major religious organisations in Australia do not perform or bless same-sex marriages in their places of worship. The largest religious denomination permitting same-sex marriage is the Uniting Church in Australia. On 13 July 2018, its National Assembly approved the creation of marriage rites for same-sex couples. The change incorporated a gender-neutral definition of marriage in the Church's official statement, though also retained the existing statement on marriage as a heterosexual union, which the Church described as an "equal yet distinct" approach to the issue. Same-sex marriages have been permitted in the Uniting Church since 21 September 2018. Some smaller Christian denominations, including Quakers, the Australia and New Zealand Unitarian Universalist Association, and the Metropolitan Community Church, also solemnise same-sex marriages. Australian Quakers have supported the celebration of same-sex commitment ceremonies since 1994 and recognize them on an equal basis with other committed and loving relationships. In January 2010, they called on the government to legislate for same-sex marriages, and agreed to treat all requests for marriages in accordance with Quaker traditions, regardless of the sexual orientation or gender of the partners. Prior to this, the first Quaker same-sex marriage was held in Canberra on 15 April 2007.

The Anglican Church of Australia's official position is that marriage is "an exclusive and lifelong union of a man and a woman", though a number of prominent members of the Church have stated support for same-sex marriage, and the prospect of a formal split on the issue has been canvassed. The Church permits the blessing of same-sex marriages on a diocesan basis; in November 2020, the Church's Appellate Tribunal approved 5–1 the right of individual dioceses to formally bless the weddings of same-sex couples married in civil ceremonies. In 2013, the Diocese of Perth voted in favour of recognising same-sex relationships, though Archbishop Roger Herft later vetoed the measure. Nonetheless, the union of a same-sex couple, Suzie and Samantha Day-Davies, was blessed at St. Andrew's Church in Subiaco in April 2016. In October 2018, the Diocese of Sydney banned same-sex marriages and events that might advocate "expressions of human sexuality contrary to our doctrine of marriage" on about a thousand church-owned properties. In 2019, the Diocese of Wangaratta voted in favour of a motion authorising a blessing rite for same-sex unions. Bishop John Parkes performed the first blessing in September 2019 in Wangaratta for Father John Davis and Father Rob Whalley, with a second blessing occurring in Milawa a few months later. The Diocese of Newcastle passed a similar motion in October 2019. The synod of the Diocese of Ballarat has also asked Bishop Garry Weatherill to permit the blessing of same-sex unions, and in June 2022 Bishop Richard Treloar of the Diocese of Gippsland said there were "no obstacles" to same-sex blessings in his diocese.

The Australian Baptist Ministries "rejects moves to extend the definition of marriage to include same-sex relationships". In May 2025, two parishes, the Canberra Baptist Church and the Hamilton Baptist Church in Newcastle, were expelled from the denomination over their decision to affirm same-sex marriages. The Greek Orthodox Church considers marriage "a sacrament ... through which the union of man and woman is sanctified by God". The Australian Christian Churches opposes same-sex marriage, and the Presbyterian Church responded to the results of the same-sex marriage survey by stating that it "continues to hold to the biblical definition of marriage as between one man and one woman as we believe it best reflects the Lord's creational design for human flourishing". The Catholic Church opposes same-sex marriage and "views marriage as a unique relationship between a woman and a man". In December 2023, the Holy See published Fiducia supplicans, a declaration allowing Catholic priests to bless couples who are not considered to be married according to church teaching, including the blessing of same-sex couples. The Australian Confraternity of Catholic Clergy reacted to the declaration, stating, "Ordained priests are ministers of God's blessings given to sanctify the human person and build up all that is true, good, and beautiful in human life. While sinful human persons who seek God's mercy are authentic recipients of God's blessings, such blessings of their nature are ordered to communion with God; to conversion and sanctification, and so can never be bestowed on sinful acts nor legitimize relationships that are intrinsically incompatible with the divine plan."

Most Islamic scholars are in agreement that homosexuality is "incompatible with Islamic theology". The Australian National Imams Council "affirms that Islam sanctifies marriage as only being between a man and a woman". The Australian Council of Hindu Clergy issued a clarifying statement in September 2017 that marriage under Hinduism is between "a man and a woman"; the group having come to the position after a formal vote was taken indicating 90% approval for the position. The Federation of Australian Buddhist Council states there is no fixed or pre-ordained form of marriage, though it "has been consistent in its support for same-sex marriage since 2012". Same-sex marriages can also be performed in Reform Jewish synagogues, but are not permitted in Orthodox or Conservative traditions. The first Jewish same-sex marriage in Australia was performed at Emanuel Synagogue in Sydney in May 2018 for Ilan Buchman and Oscar Shub.

== State and territory recognition schemes ==
Same-sex couples have access to different relationship recognition schemes in Australia's six states and three internal territories. Under federal law, they are treated as de facto relationships. Despite Australia having passed a federal same-sex marriage law, these schemes remain in place as an option for couples.

States or Territories	Official relationship status	Year of enactment
Australian Capital Territory	Domestic relationship	1994
Australian Capital Territory	Civil partnership	2008
New South Wales	Registered relationship	2010
Queensland	Civil partnership	2012
South Australia	Registered relationship	2017
Tasmania	Significant relationship	2004
(Victoria (state)) Victoria	Domestic relationship	2008

=== Civil partnerships and unions ===
Same-sex couples can enter into civil partnerships in the Australian Capital Territory (ACT) and Queensland. The schemes include state-sanctioned ceremonies that are similar to marriage ceremonies.

==== Australian Capital Territory ====
Previously, same-sex couples could enter into civil unions in the Australian Capital Territory. In August 2012, a civil union bill passed the Legislative Assembly. The Civil Union Act 2012 granted many of the same rights to same-sex couples as people married under the Marriage Act 1961. The Act was not challenged by the Gillard government. It was to be repealed and civil unions were to be no longer accessible to same-sex couples upon commencement of the Marriage Equality (Same Sex) Act 2013, which (if not struck down by the High Court) would have permanently legalised same-sex marriage in the territory. Due to the High Court's ruling striking down the ACT's same-sex marriage law as invalid, the repeal of the Act was of no effect and civil unions continued to take place in the ACT until 2017. From 2017, forming a new civil union is no longer possible as section 7 of the Civil Union Act 2012 requires that potential couples be unable to marry under the Marriage Act 1961. When same-sex marriage was legalised, it became legally impossible to form a civil union, though existing ones remain valid.

Since 2008, the ACT has recognised civil partnerships which provide same-sex couples with increased rights regarding superannuation, taxation and social security. Although the Civil Partnerships Act 2008 was repealed upon passage of the aforementioned Civil Unions Act 2012, entering into civil partnerships, which are now regulated by the Domestic Relationships Act 1994, remains an option for same-sex and opposite-sex couples. Couples can also enter into domestic relationships, which were enacted in 1994. The ACT's laws also apply to the Jervis Bay Territory.

==== Queensland ====
Civil partnerships have been legal in Queensland since April 2016. The Queensland Parliament passed the Discrimination Law Amendment Act 2002 in December of that year, which created non-discriminatory definitions of "de facto partner" with respect to 42 pieces of legislation. This gave same-sex couples the same rights as de facto couples in most instances.

On 30 November 2011, the Queensland Parliament passed a bill allowing civil partnerships. The legislation passed by a vote of 47 to 40, with those against including four votes from the Labor Party. The Civil Partnerships Act 2011 allowed for same-sex couples who are Queensland residents to enter into a civil partnership. Shortly after the change of government in the 2012 state elections, and following high profile advertisements for repeal of the law by Katter's Australian Party, the centre-right Liberal National government passed the Civil Partnerships and Other Legislation Amendment Act 2012. The new law changed the name from "civil partnership" to "registered relationship" and prohibited the state from offering ceremonies for those who registered their relationship in this manner. Following the 2015 state election, which saw Labor form minority government, the Parliament passed the Relationships (Civil Partnerships) and Other Acts Amendment Act 2015 in December 2015, which restored state-sanctioned ceremonies for same-sex and opposite-sex couples and once more changed regulations referring to "registered relationships" with "civil partnerships". The law came into effect following a number of administrative matters occurring, with civil partnerships resuming in the state on 2 April 2016.

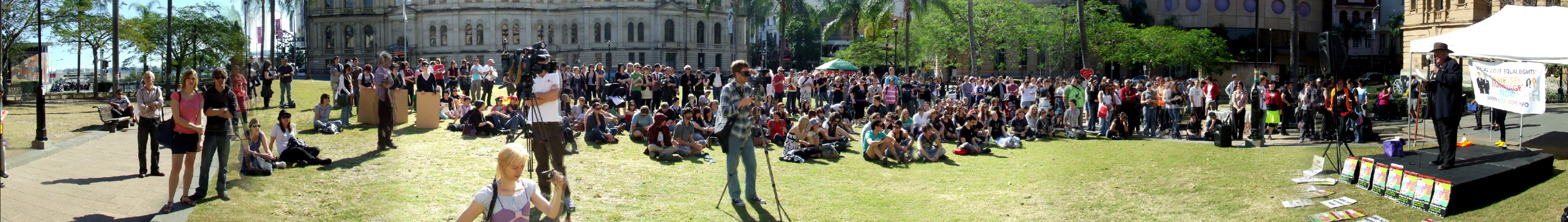
Protest rally in Brisbane, 2009

=== Registered relationships ===
Same-sex couples have access to domestic partnership registries (otherwise known as registered relationships) in the Australian Capital Territory, New South Wales, Tasmania, Victoria and South Australia.

==== New South Wales ====
New South Wales, Australia's most populous state, has recognised domestic partnerships since July 2010. The Relationships Register Act 2010 was passed by the New South Wales Parliament in May and came into effect on 1 July 2010. The Act provides conclusive proof of the existence of a relationship and ensures participants gain all the rights afforded to de facto couples under state and federal law. Previously, in June 2008, the Parliament passed the Miscellaneous Acts Amendment (Same Sex Relationships) Act 2008. The Act amended several other state laws to recognise co-mothers as legal parents of children born through donor insemination and to ensure birth certificates allow both mothers to be recognised. Additionally, the Act amended 57 pieces of state legislation to ensure de facto couples, including same-sex couples, are treated equally with married couples. Finally, the Act amended the New South Wales Anti-Discrimination Act 1977 to ensure same-sex couples are protected from discrimination on the basis of their "marital or domestic status" in employment, accommodation and access to other goods and services.

New South Wales has also sought to legislate with respect to same-sex marriage. In November 2013, a bill was introduced to the Legislative Council to legalise same-sex marriage at the state level, thought it was narrowly defeated. The external territory of Norfolk Island has, since 1 July 2016, been incorporated into New South Wales legislation. Prior to this, a same-sex marriage bill had been tabled in the Norfolk Island Legislative Assembly in September 2014, though it was eventually not put to a vote.

==== South Australia ====
In South Australia, the Statutes Amendment (Domestic Partners) Act 2006 (Number 43), which took effect 1 June 2007, amended 97 acts, dispensing with the term "de facto" and categorising couples as "domestic partners". This means that de facto same-sex and opposite-sex couples are covered by the same laws. In December 2016, the South Australia Parliament passed a law which created a relationship register for same-sex couples and recognises the relationships of same-sex couples who have married or entered into an official union in other states and nations. This law went into effect on 1 August 2017. Prior to that reform, same-sex couples could make a written agreement called a "domestic partnership agreement" about their living arrangements. This may be prepared at any time and is legal from the time it is made, but must meet other requirements, such as joint commitments, before being legally recognised.

==== Tasmania ====
In Tasmania, beginning on 1 January 2004, the Relationships Act 2003 has allowed same-sex couples to register their union as a type of domestic partnership in two distinct categories, "significant relationships" and "caring relationships", with the state's Registry of Births, Death and Marriages. A new definition of partner as "two persons" was embedded into 80 pieces of legislation, giving same-sex couples rights in making decisions about a partner's health, guardianship when a partner is incapacitated, and equal access to a partner's public sector pensions. It also allows one member of a same-sex couple to adopt the biological child of their partner. In September 2010, the Tasmanian Parliament unanimously passed legislation to recognise same-sex marriages performed in other jurisdictions as registered partnerships under the Relationships Act 2003, making it the first Australian state or territory to do so.

In August 2012, a bill was introduced to the Tasmanian Parliament to legalise same-sex marriage. The bill passed the House of Assembly, but was later rejected by the Legislative Council on 28 September 2012. In October 2013, the bill was re-introduced into the Legislative Council and was defeated once more.

==== Victoria ====
Victoria has recognised domestic partnerships since December 2008. The Victoria Parliament passed the Relationships Act 2008 on 10 April 2008, which came into effect on 1 December 2008. This has allowed same-sex couples to register their relationships with the state Registry of Births, Deaths and Marriages and provide conclusive proof of a de facto relationship, allowing them to receive all the benefits and rights of such a couple under state and federal law. In 2016, the Parliament passed reforms to the state's domestic partnership legislation, allowing for the recognition of overseas same-sex marriages on official documents and allowing couples the option of having an official ceremony when registering for a domestic partnership.

The earliest legislative reform in the state designed to provide equal treatment of same-sex couples came in August 2001, in the form of the Statute Law Amendment (Relationships) Act 2001 and the Statute Law Further Amendment (Relationships) Act 2001. The acts amended 60 laws in Victoria to give same-sex couples, called "domestic partners", many rights equal to those enjoyed by de facto couples, including hospital access, medical decision making, superannuation, inheritance rights, property tax, landlord and tenancy rights, mental health treatment and victims of crime procedures.

=== No local scheme ===
Same-sex and opposite-sex de facto couples exist in all states and territories. Before the introduction of same-sex marriage nationally, the inability of de facto couples to have conclusive evidence of their relationships in Western Australia and the Northern Territory made it more difficult for them to access rights accorded to them under the law.

==== Northern Territory ====
In the Northern Territory, the Parliament enacted the Law Reform (Gender, Sexuality and De Facto Relationships) Act 2003 in March 2004 to remove legislative discrimination against same-sex couples in most areas of territory law (except the Adoption of Children Act 1994) and recognise same-sex couples as de facto relationships. The Act removed distinctions based on a person's gender, sexuality or de facto relationship in approximately 50 acts and regulations. As in New South Wales and the Australian Capital Territory, the reforms also enabled the lesbian partner of a woman to be recognised as the parent of her partner's child across state law.

==== Western Australia ====
In Western Australia, the Acts Amendment (Lesbian and Gay Law Reform) Act 2002 removed all remaining legislative discrimination toward sexual orientation by adding the new definition of "de facto partner" into 62 acts, provisions and statutes and creating new family law designed to recognise same-sex couples as de facto relationships. Western Australia's laws are also applicable to Christmas Island and the Cocos (Keeling) Islands.

=== Local government schemes and motions ===
A number of local government councils in Australia have created relationship recognition schemes, which allow couples to register their relationship and provide conclusive proof of a de facto union for the purposes of federal law. These are the City of Sydney since 2004, the Municipality of Woollahra since 2008, the City of Blue Mountains since 2010, the City of Vincent since 2012, and the Town of Port Hedland since 2015. In Victoria, the cities of Melbourne and Yarra established relationship declaration registers in 2007. Both local governments discontinued the registers in 2018 after the federal legalisation of same-sex marriage.

Local government areas have also published official positions in favour of same-sex marriage. In June 2016, the Australian Local Government Association (ALGA) approved a motion supporting the legalisation of same-sex marriage. The motion was put forward by the Lord Mayor of Darwin, Katrina Fong Lim, and Meghan Hopper, a member of the Council of Moreland. It was approved by a strong majority at ALGA's National General Assembly. ALGA's board approved it on 21 July 2016. The motion read: "That this National General Assembly call on the Commonwealth Government to treat with dignity and respect all members of the community regardless of gender or sexuality by supporting changes to the Marriage Act to achieve marriage equality for same-sex couples."

As of 1 January 2018, of the 546 local governments (also known as "councils" or "shires") in Australia, a total of 62 were known to have passed formal motions in support of the legalisation of same-sex marriage. Those local governments were: the cities of Sydney, Greater Geelong, Hobart, Moreland, Vincent, Hawkesbury, Randwick, Blue Mountains, Lismore, Albury, Ballarat, Wodonga, Glenorchy, Port Phillip, Glen Eira, Hobsons Bay, Darebin, Greater Shepparton, Maribyrnong, Melbourne, Banyule, Yarra, Darwin, Brisbane, Lake Macquarie, Shoalhaven, Monash, Kingston, Whittlesea, Fremantle, Bayswater, Willoughby, Warrnambool, Newcastle, Moonee Valley, Stonnington, and Greater Bendigo; the councils of Camden, Inner West, Central Coast, Kingborough, Richmond Valley, North Sydney, and Waverley; the shires of Coonamble, Tenterfield, Lachlan, Bega Valley, Byron, Buloke, Strathbogie, Indigo, Bass Coast, Cardinia, Noosa, Douglas, Campaspe, Bellingen, and Nillumbik; the municipality of Woollahra; and the town of Port Hedland.

At least two local governments rejected motions to support same-sex marriage; the City of Launceston in 2015, and the Shire of Campaspe in 2015, though it later voted to support same-sex marriage.

== Public opinion ==
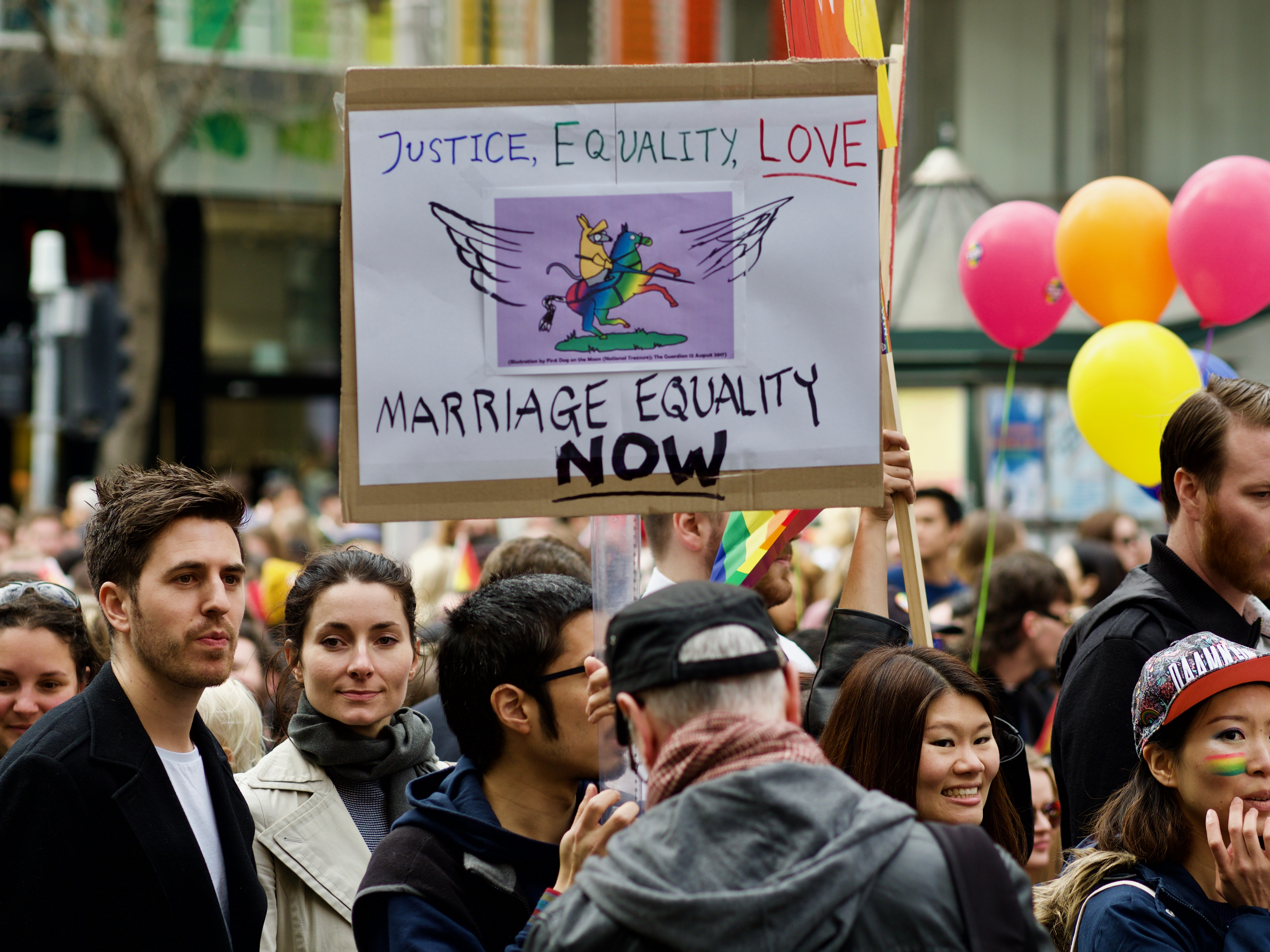
Campaigners rallying for same-sex marriage rights in Melbourne in August 2017

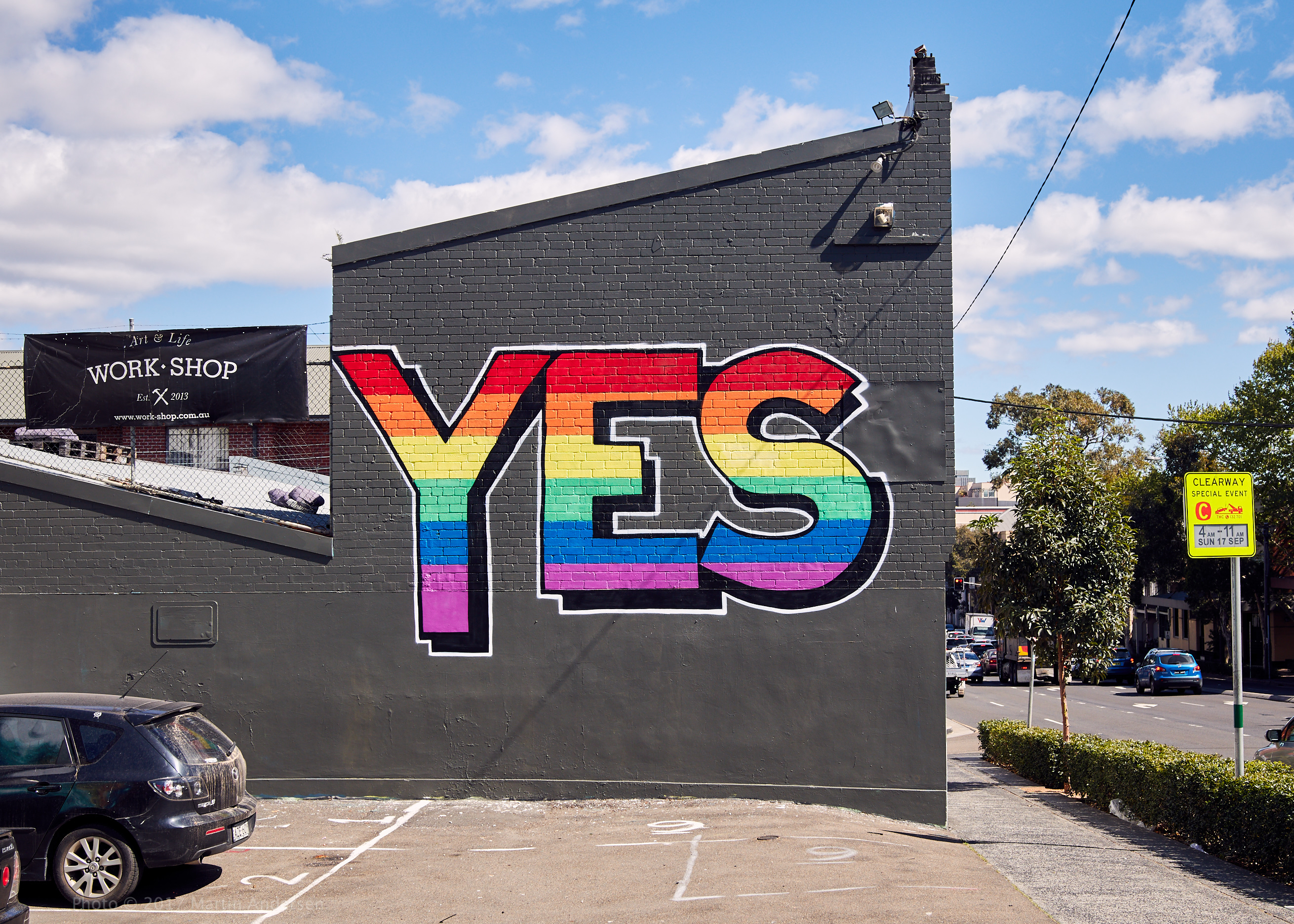
A wall in Redfern with the signage "Yes" during the postal survey

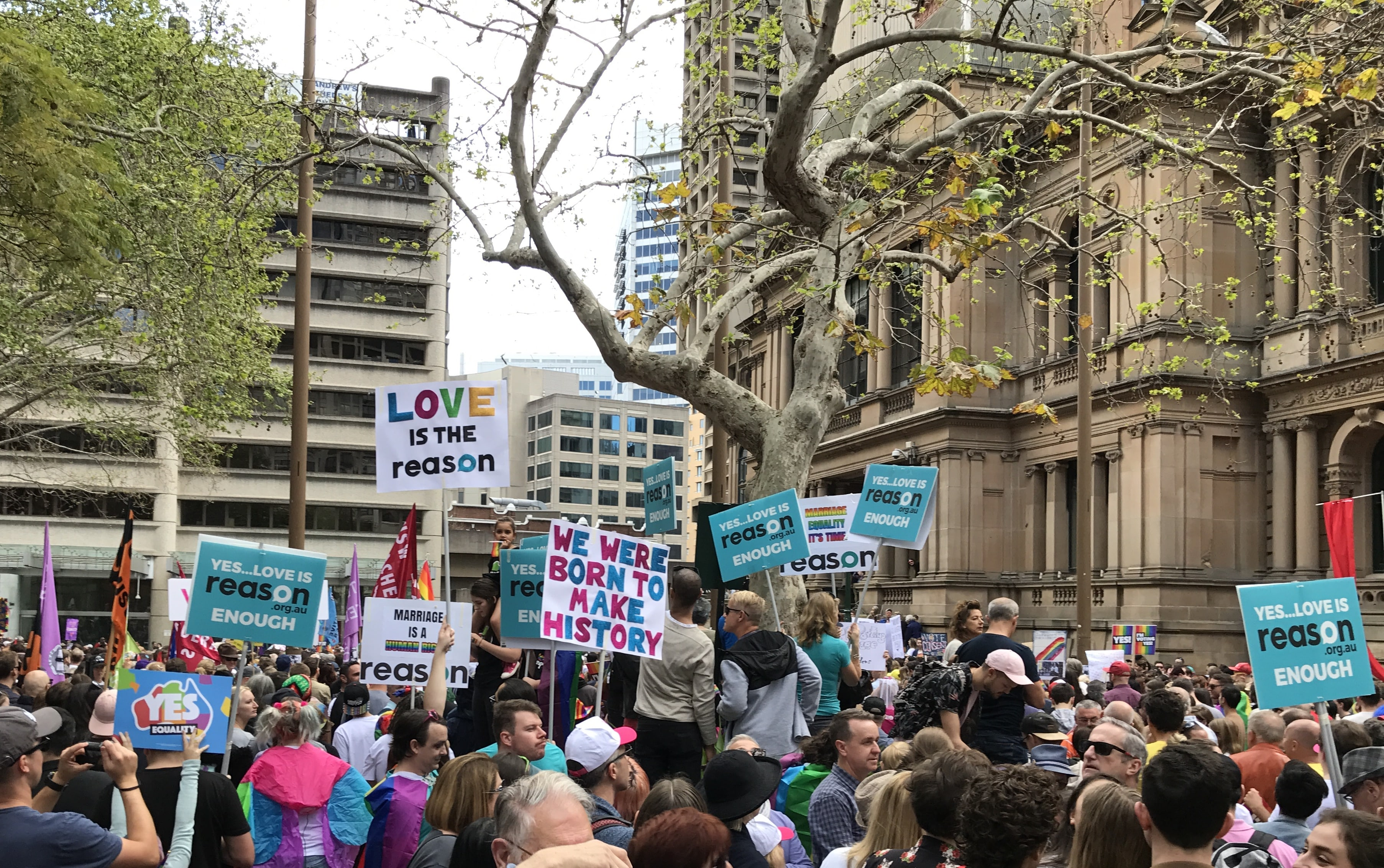
Rally in front of the Sydney Town Hall on 10 September 2017, two days before the beginning of the postal survey

The following table shows the results of opinion polls conducted to ascertain the level of support for the introduction of same-sex marriage in Australia:

Date	Firm	Support	Oppose	Undecided
March–May 2023	Pew Research Center	75%	23%	2%
March 2018	Essential	65%	26%	9%
September–October 2017	Essential	61%	32%	7%
August–September 2017	Newgate Research	58.4%	31.4%	10.2%
August 2017	Newspoll	63%	30%	7%
July 2017	Essential	63%	25%	12%
July 2017	YouGov	60%	28%	12%
February 2017	Galaxy	66%	–	–
September 2016	Newspoll	62%	32%	6%
August 2016	Essential	57%	28%	15%
March 2016	Essential	64%	26%	10%
March 2016	Roy Morgan	76%	24%	–
October 2015	Essential	59%	30%	11%
August 2015	Essential	60%	31%	9%
August 2015	Ipsos	69%	25%	6%
July 2015	ReachTEL	53.8%	32.8%	13.4%
June 2015	Ipsos	68%	25%	7%
July 2014	Newspoll	66%	–	–
July 2014	Crosby Textor	72%	21%	7%
August 2013	Nielsen	65%	28%	7%
May 2013	Ipsos	54%	20%	26%
May 2013	Roy Morgan	65%	35%	–
August 2012	Galaxy	64%	30%	6%
July 2011	Roy Morgan	68%	30%	2%
October 2010	Galaxy	62%	33%	5%
June 2009	Galaxy	60%	36%	4%
June 2007	Galaxy	57%	37%	6%
June 2004	Newspoll	38%	44%	18%

Support for same-sex marriage among 18–21-year-olds according to a 2016 survey from the Varkey Foundation

A September–October 2016 survey by the Varkey Foundation found that 77% of 18–21-year-olds supported same-sex marriage in Australia.

According to a survey published in late January 2018 by the Social Research Center along with the Australian National University, same-sex marriage was ranked the most historic event to have shaped the lives of Australians. 30% of the survey participants named the legalisation of same-sex marriage as the most historic event in their lifetime, 27% named the September 11 attacks, 13% named former Prime Minister Kevin Rudd's apology to Indigenous Australians and another 13% named the Port Arthur massacre.

The Pew Research Center poll conducted between March and May 2023 showed that 75% of Australians supported same-sex marriage, 23% were opposed and 2% did not know or had refused to answer. When divided by age, support was highest among 18–39-year-olds at 80% and lowest among those aged 40 and above at 73%. When divided by political affiliation, support was highest among those on the left of the political spectrum at 94%, followed by those at the centre at 74% and those on the right at 57%.

== See also ==
- Australian family law
- Gay and Lesbian Kingdom of the Coral Sea Islands
- LGBT rights in Australia
- Marriage in Australia
- History of same-sex marriage in Australia
- Same-sex marriage in the Australian Capital Territory
- Same-sex marriage in Tasmania
- Recognition of same-sex unions in Oceania
- He never married
