= Relationship register =

Recognized partnership alternative to marriage

A relationship register is an alternative to marriage that provides legal proof of a relationship. This may be useful in issues relating to tax, retirement accounts, government payments, immigration or medical emergencies. Most states and territories in Australia provide a relationship register, and similar registers exist in other jurisdictions, such as the Canadian province of Manitoba.

== Effect on marriage statistics ==
Relationships recorded in these registers are not included in Australian marriage statistics, which the Australian Bureau of Statistics identified as a possible data anomaly. While marriage rates have declined, the recently introduced relationship registers have grown in use. Although some couples have registered relationships because they are prohibited from marrying under the federal Marriage Act 1961 as amended by the Marriage Amendment Act 2004, other couples have registered as an alternative to marriage, thus reducing the marriage rate.
