= Transgender rights in Australia =

Transgender rights in Australia have legal protection under federal and state/territory laws, but the requirements for gender recognition vary depending on the jurisdiction. For example, birth certificates, recognised details certificates, and driver licences are regulated by the states and territories, while Medicare and passports are matters for the Commonwealth.

Changing legal gender assignment for federal purposes such as Medicare and passports requires only a letter from a treating medical practitioner. By contrast, most states and territories impose additional requirements for gender recognition that have been criticised by the Australian Human Rights Commission and LGBT+ advocates. This includes requiring the person to undergo sexual reassignment surgery and, in most jurisdictions until 2018, to divorce if married. Advocates argue that marital status and surgery requirements are irrelevant to the recognition of a person's sex or gender identity, and instead should rely on their self-identification. The legalisation of same-sex marriage in 2017 removed the requirement to divorce if one was already married. This took effect on 9 December 2018 unless the state or territory government has already removed this requirement beforehand.

Gender reassignment surgery is available in Australia with the costs of some, but not all, treatments for transgender people covered by the national Medicare public health scheme. Between 2004 and 2017 transgender children required approval from the Family Court of Australia before being prescribed hormone treatment, although a series of rulings in 2013 and 2017 removed the need for court approval of puberty blockers and cross-sex hormone therapy where there is no dispute between a child, their parents and their treating doctors.

== History ==
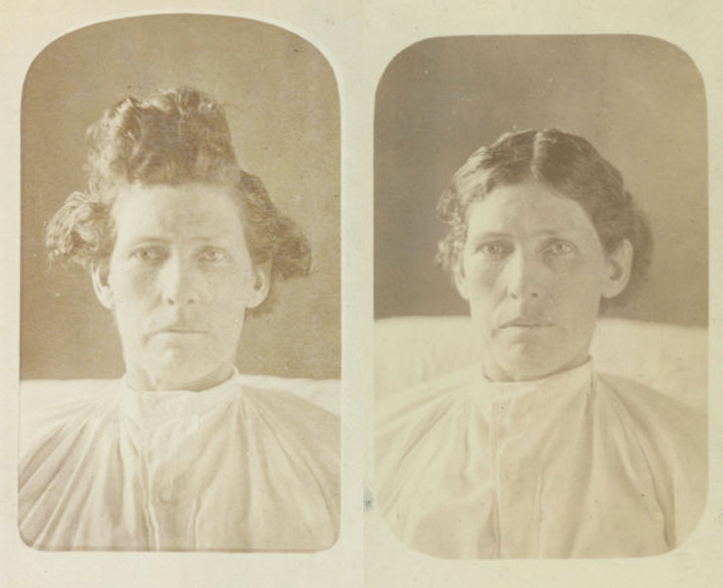
1879 photographs of transgender man Edward de Lacy Evans, upon his admittance to Kew Lunatic Asylum in Victoria.

=== 19th century ===
Edward de Lacy Evans (1830–1901) was a servant, blacksmith, and coal miner who publicly identified as male for the majority of his life, was registered as the father of his son, and referred to as "Dadds" and "Uncle" by his family members. He was inducted into various mental health asylums, such as Kew Lunatic Asylum, in attempts to "cure" his male identity. Evans made international news in 1879 when it was discovered he was assigned female at birth. The following year, he made his identity publicly known, such as by performing in the Melbourne Waxworks under the tagline 'The Wonderful Male Impersonator', or in Sydney as 'The Man-Woman Mystery'.

=== 20th century ===
Following the widespread newspaper reports of the successful sex change operations of Christine Jorgensen in December 1952 and Roberta Cowell in March 1954, the first reported case of an Australian undertaking a sex change operation was an ex-RAAF Staff Sergeant Robert James Brooks in February 1956.

In 1975, the Gender Dysphoria Clinic at Queen Victoria Hospital, Melbourne was established by Trudy Kennedy and Herbert Bower. The clinic later moved in the Monash Medical Centre in 1989 and closed surgeries in 2009; however, it continues to provide mental health assessments and referrals as the Monash Health Gender Clinic.

In 1979 Australia's first transgender rights and advocacy organisations were established, the Melbourne-based Victorian Transsexual Coalition and the Victorian Transsexual Association; these were followed in 1981 by the Sydney-based Australian Transsexual Association, which was founded by Noelena Tame and whose membership included prominent activist, academic and author Roberta Perkins.

In 1987, Estelle Asmodelle became possibly Australia's first legally recognized post operative transgender person with the Births, Deaths and Marriages Department of New South Wales, and her transition helped gain recognition for transgender people in Australia. This was the first time in Australian legal history that a transgender Australian was permitted to change their birth certificate to a different sex. Soon afterwards the passport laws also changed to allow the sex on passports to be changed.

In 2012, Rebekah Robertson, when she was desperately searching for information that would help her to support her child Georgie, set out to establish the charity Transcend Australia.

== Identification documents ==
=== Issues ===
==== Forced divorce ====
Traditionally, all states and territories required a person to be single before changing the sex recorded on their birth certificate, which meant divorcing their spouse if the person was married. This was to prevent a same-sex marriage arising after the person's transition to the same sex as their spouse, given the federal ban on same-sex marriage in Australia before 2017.

To prevent married transgender people challenging the "forced divorce" requirement on the basis that it discriminated against their marital status in breach of the Sex Discrimination Act, in 2011 the Gillard government introduced an exemption in section 40(5) of that Act allowing a State or Territory "to refuse to make, issue or alter an official record of a person's sex if a law of a State or Territory requires the refusal because the person is married".

Despite the exemption, both Australian Capital Territory and South Australia changed birth certificate sex markers for married transgender people before the introduction of same-sex marriage, with the latter repealing its "forced divorce" law in 2016. Legislation abolishing forced transgender divorce in Tasmania was first introduced in 2014 but did not pass until 2019. In 2017 the United Nations Human Rights Committee upheld a New South Wales woman's objection to her state's forced divorce law, finding it violated articles 17 and 26 of the International Covenant on Civil and Political Rights. New South Wales ended its forced divorce requirement in 2018.

The section 40(5) exemption was repealed by the law legalising same-sex marriage in Australia, the Marriage Amendment (Definition and Religious Freedoms) Act 2017, making it unlawful discrimination for Australian states and territories to require a transgender person to divorce before changing the sex on their birth certificate. However, the repeal did not take effect until 9 December 2018, giving states and territories 12 months to repeal any divorce requirement in their gender recognition laws.

==== Medical requirements ====
In 2014 the Australian Capital Territory abolished the sex reassignment surgery requirement for a change of sex on birth certificates, after a 2013 Law Reform Advisory Council report called it "inhumane".

In 2014 trans man Paige Phoenix challenged the Victorian requirement for surgery on the basis that it would be potentially life-threatening, making a complaint to the Human Rights Commission and United Nations.

South Australia abolished the surgery requirement in December 2016, while a similar proposal in Victoria failed in the Legislative Council by one vote. Victoria later abolished the surgery requirement in May 2020.

Western Australia formerly required sterilisation prior to approving a change in sex classification. This requirement was overturned when the High Court ruled, in the 2012 case of AB v Western Australia, that two transgender men who had undergone mastectomies and hormone treatment did not need to undergo sterilisation to obtain a WA gender recognition certificate.

==== Non-binary gender recognition ====
Norrie May-Welby is a Scottish-Australian who became the first transgender person in Australia to publicly pursue a legal status of neither a man nor a woman. That status was subject to appeals by the State of New South Wales.

In April 2014, the High Court of Australia unanimously ruled in the Norrie Case that, having undergone sex affirmation surgery, androgynous person Norrie was to be registered as neither a man nor a woman with the NSW Registry of Births, Deaths and Marriages. The decision follows previous regulations and legislation that recognises a third gender classification, and establishes that Australia's legal system recognises and permits the gender registration of 'non-specific', as the judges found in the Norrie case.

The Australian Capital Territory's 2014 birth certificate law amendments also allowed people to register as male, female or "X" regardless of whether they had undertaken any surgery. Victoria's failed 2014 proposal had a similar approach.

In April 2019, Tasmania amended the Birth, Deaths and Marriages Registration Act to allow the registration of genders on the basis of self-identification, with gender defined by the applicant through a statutory declaration. This allows a diversity of genders. Any gender-related description should be allowable, through the Registrar may refuse vexatious or obscene applications. The law within Tasmania goes into effect on 5 September 2019, after royal assent was granted on 8 May 2019 by the Governor of Tasmania.

In July 2025, New South Wales became the last state to legally recognise a Non-Binary Identity.

==== Australian residents born overseas ====
Australian residents born overseas are eligible to record a change of gender with their state/territory's RBDM in the Australian Capital Territory, New South Wales, South Australia, Victoria, and Western Australia. After a change is recorded, they are issued a recognised details certificate (identity acknowledgment certificate in South Australia).

=== Protections by state ===
Jurisdiction	Change of sex on birth certificates or recognised details certificates	Gender self-identification	Sex reassignment surgery optional?	Forced divorce abolished?	Non-binary gender recognised?	Anti-discrimination laws concerning gender identity
Australian Capital Territory	Yes	Yes	Yes	Yes	Yes	Yes
New South Wales and Norfolk Island	Yes	Yes	Yes	Yes	Yes	Yes
Northern Territory	Yes (birth certificates only, no recognised details certificates issued)	No	Yes (Appropriate clinical treatment)	Yes	Yes	Yes
Queensland	Yes (annotation on birth certificates only, no recognised details certificates issued)	No	Yes	Yes	Yes	Yes
South Australia	Yes	No	Yes (Appropriate clinical treatment)	Yes	Yes	Yes
Tasmania	Yes (birth certificates only, no recognised details certificates issued)	Yes	Yes	Yes	Yes	Yes
Victoria	Yes	Yes	Yes	Yes	Yes	Yes
Western Australia	Yes	No	Yes (Appropriate clinical treatment)	Yes	Yes	Yes

Birth certificates and recognised details certificates are issued by states and territories. In many states, sterilisation is (or has been) required for transgender people to obtain recognition of their preferred gender in cardinal identification documents.

==== Australian Capital Territory ====
In 2014, the Australian Capital Territory passed legislation that removed the surgery requirement for changing the sex marker on birth certificates. In 2016 the ACT introduced a recognised details certificate for transgender people who were born outside the Territory to use as their proof of gender instead of a birth certificate. The ACT, since 2020, has also allowed youths to change their given names and sex to better reflect their gender identity. This can be done without parental permission if they are 16 or 17, or if they are given permission by ACT Civil & Administrative Tribunal.

==== New South Wales ====
The New South Wales Registry of Births Deaths & Marriages requires that transgender people must have "undergone a sex affirmation procedure".

In October 2020, the NSW Parliament lower house passed a "non-binding bipartisan motion" unanimously - calling for the human rights, dignity and respect for transgender individuals within NSW.

In January 2021, it was reported by the news media that transgender individuals who had not undergone sex reassignment surgery were banned from entering a ladies-only pool within Coogee.

In October 2024, the Equality Legislation Amendment (LGBTIQA+) Bill was passed, thus making it possible to have one's legal sex be changed without requiring surgery, and to make threatening to out a transgender person an offence. However, the bill was criticised by Sydney Criminal Lawyers for being heavily modified and "diluted". It took effect in July 2025.

==== South Australia ====
In December 2016, South Australia became the first state to remove the surgery requirement for a change of sex on birth certificates and identity acknowledgment certificates.

==== Tasmania ====
On 10 April 2019, the Tasmanian Parliament passed amendments to the Birth, Deaths and Marriages Registration Act. These amendment make Tasmania the first state to allow change of gender on Birth Certificates by a simple statutory declaration. There are a number of other landmark provisions. People 16 or over can apply independently. Parents can apply for change of the gender of children of any age. Gender can be self-described, and is not limited to certain categories. Parents can ask that birth certificates do not include a gender marker (at all: not a marker of "undetermined", "unstated", etc.). Persons can ask that their own certificates do not include gender markers. This is in line with the Yogyakarta +10 recommendation 31, Royal assent was granted on 8 May 2019 by the Governor of Tasmania and went into effect after 120 days (i.e. from 5 September 2019).

==== Victoria ====
In August 2019, the Births, Deaths and Marriages Registration Amendment Bill passed, allowing Victorians to update their sex on their birth certificate without undergoing sex reassignment surgery. It took effect on 1 May 2025. In November 2025, the fees to update one's sex on their birth certificate or to be issued a recognised details certificate were waived, including postage costs.

=== Passports ===
The Australian Government Guidelines on the Recognition of Sex and Gender, which took effect from 1 July 2013, enable any adult to choose to identify as male, female or X. Documentary evidence must be provided from a doctor or psychologist, but no medical intervention is required.

Alex MacFarlane was reported as receiving a passport with an 'X' sex descriptor in early 2003. MacFarlane achieved this after using an indeterminate birth certificate that was issued by the State of Victoria. Australian government policy between 2003 and 2011 was to issue passports with an 'X' marker only to people who could "present a birth certificate that notes their sex as indeterminate".

In 2011, the Australian Passport Office introduced new guidelines for issuing of passports with a new gender, and broadened the availability of the X descriptor to all individuals with documented "indeterminate" sex. The revised policy stated that "sex reassignment surgery is not a prerequisite to issue a passport in a new gender. Birth or citizenship certificates do not need to be amended."

== Gender dysphoria treatment ==
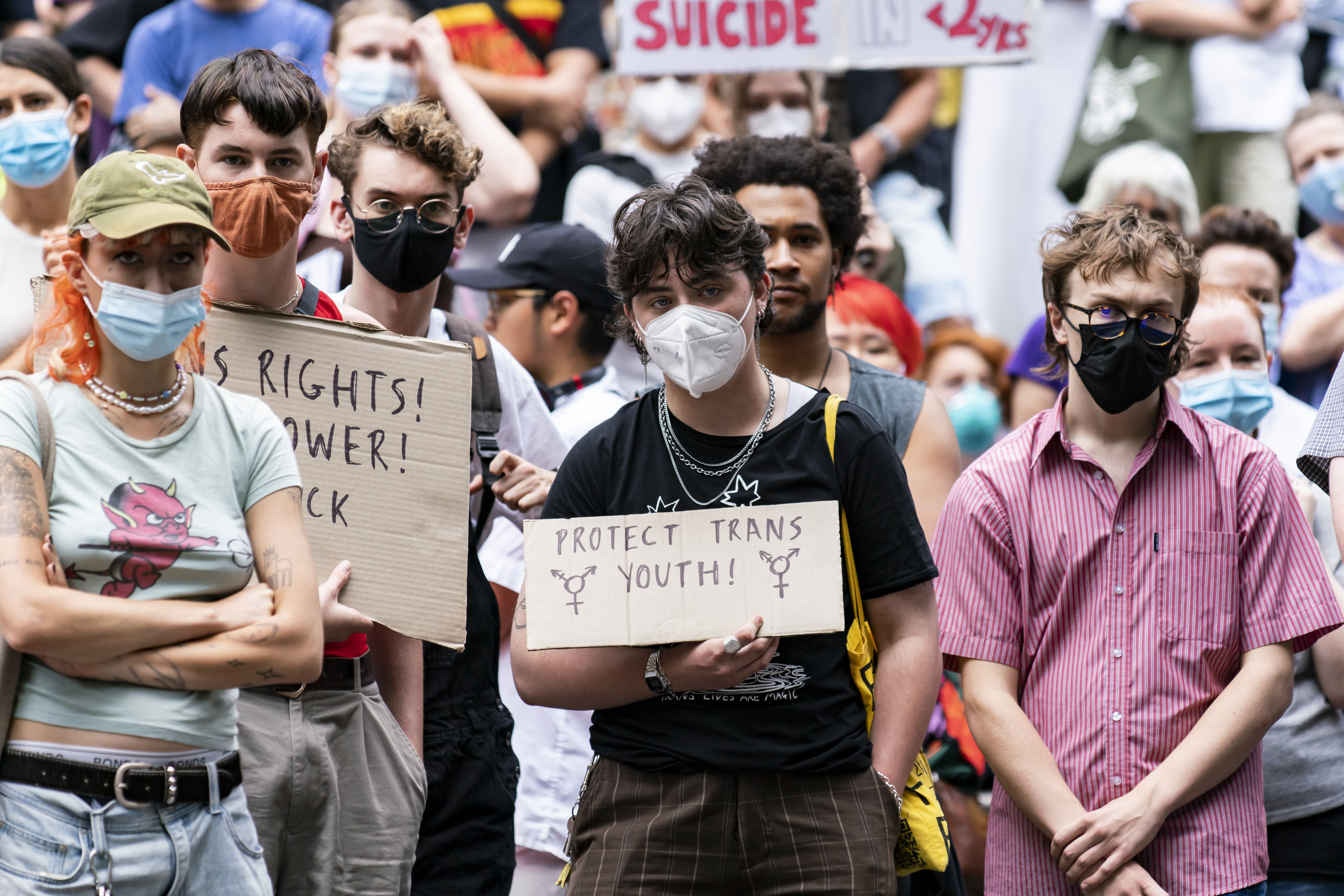
Protect Trans Youth. 2022

=== Access by minors ===
Medical treatment is available to a minor who has been diagnosed with gender dysphoria. An independent review into gender-affirming care for minors commissioned by the New South Wales government and released in September 2024 found that puberty blockers are "safe, effective and reversible". However, they also called for more long-term research. A diagnosis requires that the minor feels and verbalises a strong desire to have a different gender for at least six months.

The Royal Australasian College of Physicians, the Royal Australian College of General Practitioners, the Australian Endocrine Society, and AusPATH all support access to puberty blockers for transgender youth.

Medical treatment for minors with gender dysphoria experiencing puberty is generally divided into two stages:

- Stage 1 treatment involves the use of puberty blockers, which are reversible and can be accessed by minors who have reached stages 2 or 3 of pubertal development on the Tanner Scale – this may occur as early as 10 years old;
- Stage 2 treatment involves administering transgender hormone therapy such as testosterone or oestrogen. This has irreversible effects (such as a deepened voice following masculinizing hormone therapy or breast growth after feminizing hormone therapy). It is usually available once a person has turned 16.

Transgender Australians are generally not eligible for sexual reassignment surgery until they turn 18 years old.

A number of requirements must be satisfied in order for a transgender minor to receive treatment. Stage 1 treatment in Australia is provided in accordance with the Endocrine Society's Clinical Practice Guideline "Endocrine Treatment of Transsexual Persons" and involves:

- a standardised assessment of psychological development by two independent child and adolescent psychiatrists
- a formal assessment of the minor's gender identification and capacity to understand the proposed treatment
- an assessment by a paediatric endocrinologist to establish the minor's pubertal stage and exclude disorders of sex development
- discussions between the paediatric endocrinologist, the minor and their parents about the effects and risks of blocking puberty
- (if there is any disagreement between the minor, a parent or the medical practitioner about the treatment) legal authorisation from the Family Court of Australia

Access to Stage 2 treatment requires the following:

- consensus among a team of medical practitioners (a paediatrician, a fertility expert and two mental health professionals of whom at least one must be a psychiatrist) that the treatment is in the best interests of the minor
- (if there is any disagreement between the minor, a parent or the medical practitioner about the treatment) legal authorisation from the Family Court of Australia

==== Queensland ban ====
In January 2025, shortly after assuming office, Queensland Health Minister Tim Nicholls under the right-wing Queensland Liberal Party announced an immediate pause on the prescription of puberty blockers (Stage 1 treatment) and cross-sex hormones (Stage 2 treatment) for new patients under 18 with gender dysphoria in Queensland's public health services, pending an independent review of evidence and best practices. The directive, issued by Queensland Health Director-General David Rosengren, exempted existing patients and allowed non-pharmacological support such as counselling, citing "contested evidence" on benefits and risks, including reports of treatments provided to minors as young as 12 without adequate oversight. In November 2025, the opposition left-wing Queensland Labor Party passed a motion opposing the ban.

The policy, the first such ban in an Australian state, faced legal challenge from a parent of a transgender teenager, who argued it was procedurally flawed and politically motivated. On 27 October 2025, the Queensland Supreme Court ruled the directive unlawful, finding Rosengren had failed to conduct required consultations with Hospital and Health Service executives (limited to a 22-minute Microsoft Teams meeting concurrent with Nicholls's media announcement) under the Hospital and Health Boards Act 2011. Justice Peter Callaghan set aside the order, describing it as an improper exercise of power, though he did not rule on its substantive merits.

Hours later, on 28 October 2025, Nicholls exercised his ministerial discretion under section 44 of the Act to issue a new directive reinstating the restrictions in substantially the same terms, applying immediately to all public Hospital and Health Services. It mandates multidisciplinary panel approval for any exceptions and prioritises psychological interventions, pending the review's completion (expected November 2025) and a further evidence assessment by January 2026. Nicholls justified the action as necessary "in the public interest" to protect children amid ongoing debates over treatment efficacy. A legal challenge against the new directive was filed in December 2025.

The move has drawn criticism from medical bodies like the Australian Medical Association, left-wing political parties and LGBTQ+ advocates, who contend it undermines clinical autonomy, evidence-based care, and access for vulnerable youth, potentially exacerbating inequities by pushing families toward private services.

==== Court involvement ====
In the 2004 case Re Alex : Hormonal Treatment for Gender Identity Dysphoria the Family Court of Australia held that both Stage 1 and Stage 2 treatments for gender dysphoria were non-therapeutic "special medical procedures" for the purposes of the Family Law Act 1975, which meant that even if a minor's parents consented, the Family Court's approval was necessary to ensure the minor's welfare was protected. This was based on the principles of Marion's Case, in which the High Court of Australia ruled that parental consent was insufficient for "special medical procedures", and instead court approval was necessary to ensure they were in the best interests of the minor. After that case, the Family Court heard an increasing number of applications for child gender dysphoria treatment.

In its judgments, the Family Court assessed the minor's Gillick competence; in other words, whether the minor was in a position to consent to the treatment by fully understanding its nature, effects and risks. If the Court found the minor to be Gillick-competent, the minor's wishes had to be respected. If not, the Court would then decide whether the proposed treatment was in the minor's best interests.

The need for court involvement was relaxed in several 2013 judgments, which were approved by the Full Court of the Family Court in Re Jamie. In these cases, the judges accepted that the medical treatments were therapeutic in nature and that parents could consent to Stage 1 treatment for their child without court oversight. Following these cases, court approval for Stage 1 treatment is only necessary if there was a disagreement between the minor, their parents or their treating doctors about the treatment.

Australia was the only country in the world to require court involvement in the process. Several families with transgender children called for the Family Court's role to be abolished in all non-disputed cases, given that the legal process merely "rubber stamped" the expert opinions of medical practitioners and imposed significant financial and emotional costs on applicants. The legal process cost about $30,000 in 2016. Opponents of court involvement also indicated that some transgender teenagers were risking their lives sourcing cross-sex hormones on the black market due to the cost and delays caused by the legal process.

In 2016, Family Court Chief Justice Diana Bryant acknowledged the difficulties of the existing process and promised it would be simplified. Bryant had earlier suggested in 2014 that the High Court of Australia should reconsider the case law requiring court supervision for the medical treatment of transgender children. In late 2016 a spokesperson for Attorney-General George Brandis said the government was "actively considering options" for reform.

On 30 November 2017, the Full Court of the Family Court issued a ruling which removed the requirement for court approval of Stage 2 where the minor, the family and medical staff all agreed. The case, known as Re Kelvin, was brought by a father of a 16-year old transgender child, who asked the court to consider whether previous case law requiring the court process for unopposed applications should be overturned. The case had several interveners, most of whom agreed that the court should be only be involved in the process if there was a disagreement.

In January 2025, Federal health minister Mark Butler announced a National Health and Medical Research Council (NHMRC) review of the Australian standards of care and treatment guidelines for trans and gender-diverse children and adolescents. The NHMRC has also been asked to develop new national guidelines.

=== Access by adults ===
Gender reassignment surgery is available in Australia, but only at a few private hospitals at a relatively high cost. The costs of some, but not all treatments for trans people are covered by the national Medicare public health scheme. Trans advocates have campaigned for full Medicare funding for various treatments that may be unaffordable for transgender people, such as top surgery, facial surgery and hormone therapy, among others. Some Australian medical staff lack expertise in trans issues, particularly in rural areas, and many transgender Australians travel overseas for surgery to countries such as Thailand. Australia's compulsory superannuation scheme for retirement savings can be accessed early to cover the cost of surgery locally and overseas. Members of the transgender community have also called for greater access to mental health services given the increased demand. Private psychologists and psychiatrists can be expensive, with delays of 12 to 18 months recorded in Victoria for access via the public system. A few doctors require psychological or psychiatric evaluation before prescribing hormone therapy, but the informed consent approach has made the process easier in recent years.

== Conversion therapy ==
Conversion therapy has been a criminal offence in Queensland since August 2020. Banned in Victoria since February 2021. An Australian Capital Territory law banning conversion therapy went into effect on 4 March 2021. New South Wales banned conversion therapy from April 2025. South Australia banned conversion therapy in September 2024.

Western Australia, the Northern Territory and Tasmania have not introduced any bills to ban conversion therapy.

== Discrimination protections ==
=== Federal law protections ===
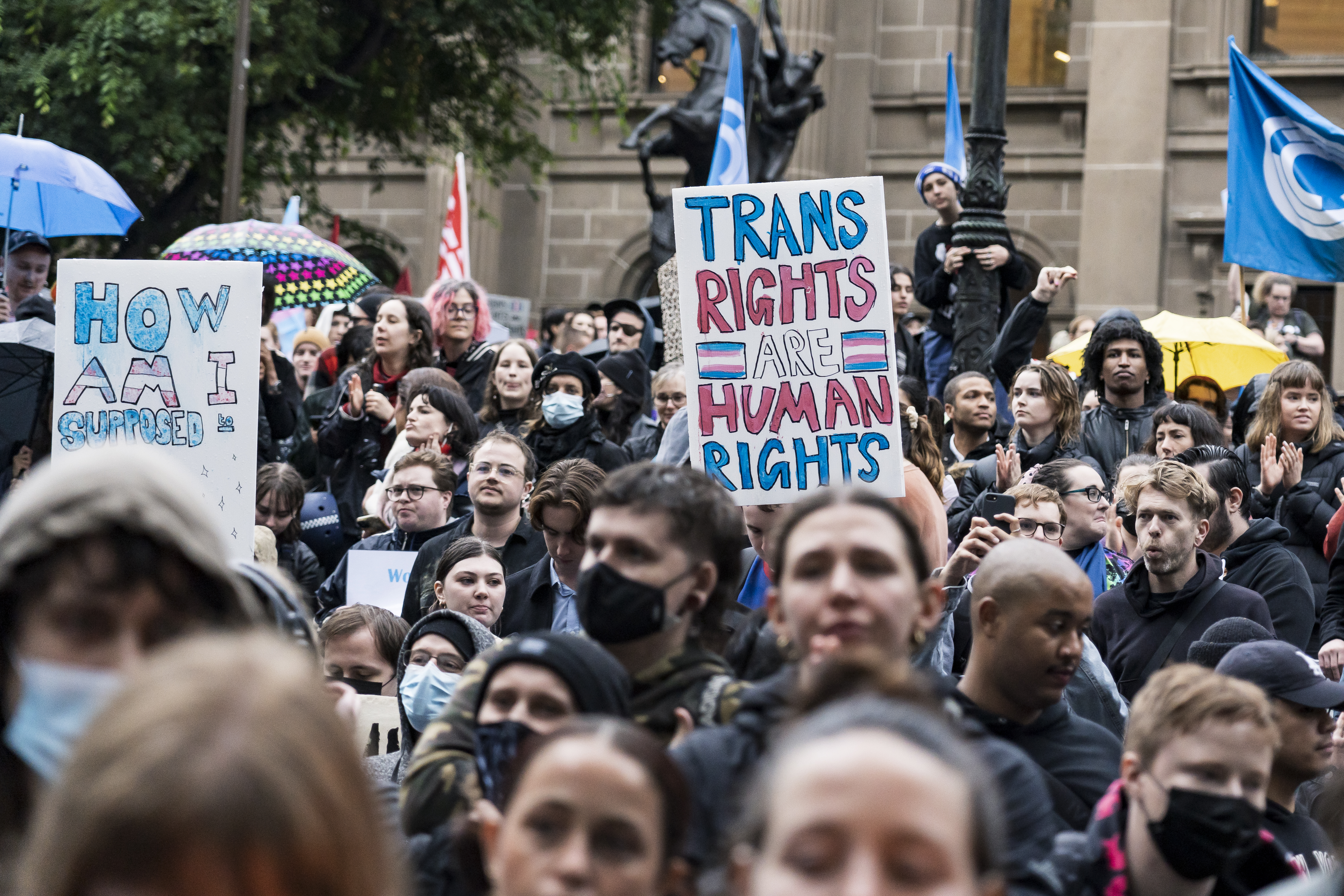
Transgender Day of Visibility 2023, Melbourne, Australia

Prior to 1 August 2013 Australia did not comprehensively outlaw discrimination based on gender identity at the federal level. In late 2010, the Gillard Labor government announced a review of federal anti-discrimination laws, with the aim of introducing a single equality law that would also cover sexual orientation and gender identity. This approach was abandoned and instead on 25 June 2013, the Federal Parliament added marital or relationship status, sexual orientation, gender identity and intersex status as protected attributes to the existing Sex Discrimination Act by passing the Sex Discrimination Amendment (Sexual Orientation, Gender Identity and Intersex Status) Act 2013.

From 1 August 2013, discrimination against transgender and gender diverse people, and all LGBTI people, became illegal for the first time under national law. Aged care providers who are owned by religious groups will no longer be able to exclude people from aged care services based on their LGBTI or same-sex relationship status. However, religious owned private schools and religious owned hospitals are exempt from gender identity and sexual orientation provisions in the Sex Discrimination Amendment (Sexual Orientation, Gender Identity and Intersex Status) Bill 2013. Protections for transgender people under the Sex Discrimination Act were tested in 2024 during the Tickle v Giggle case in the Federal court. The case related to the exclusion of a transgender woman from a "women-only" social media platform, which the judge ruled was in violation of the Sex Discrimination Act.

=== State and territory law protections ===
Aside from Commonwealth (i.e. federal) anti-discrimination laws, each of the states and territories have their own laws which protect LGBTI people from discrimination.

=== School anti-bullying programs ===
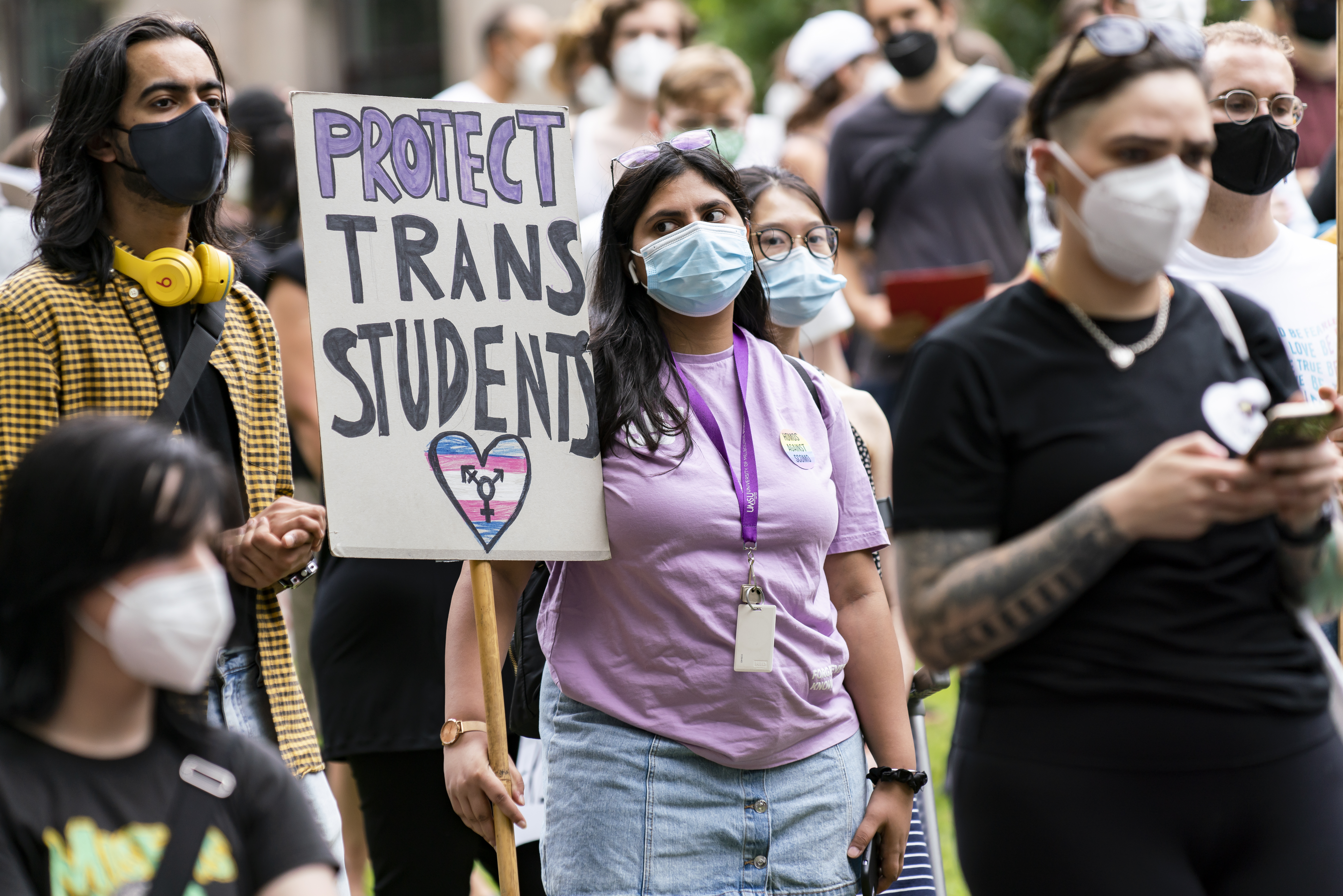
Protect Trans Students Protest sign in Melbourne. 2022

The Safe Schools Coalition Australia has sought to combat anti-LGBTI abuse or bullying, which research suggested was prevalent across Australian schools. Initially established in Victorian schools in 2010, the program was launched nationwide in 2014 under the Abbott government. The program received support from a majority of state governments, LGBTI support groups and other religious and non-governmental organisations such as Beyond Blue, headspace and the Australian Secondary Principals Association.

However, the program faced criticism in 2015 and 2016 from social conservatives including the Australian Christian Lobby, LNP politicians such as Cory Bernardi, George Christensen, Eric Abetz, Malcolm Turnbull, Tony Abbott, Kevin Andrews, and former Labor Senator Joe Bullock for indoctrinating children with "Marxist cultural relativism" and age-inappropriate sexuality and gender concepts in schools, while others criticised the Marxist political views of Roz Ward, a key figure in the program. Petitions were also delivered against the program by members of Australia's Chinese and Indian communities.

The concerns led to a review under the Turnbull government, which implemented a number of changes such as restricting the program to high schools, removing role playing activities and requiring parental consent before students take part. The federal changes were rejected by the governments of Victoria and the Australian Capital Territory, who persisted with the original program and announced they would fund it independently of the federal government. Funding for the federal program has since been allowed to lapse.

== Marriage ==
In the 2001 case of Re Kevin – validity of marriage of transsexual, the Family Court of Australia held that a post-operative transgender person could be recognised as their new gender for the purposes of marriage.

== Prison ==
During the 1990s, a trans woman held in Brisbane's Boggo Road Gaol was reportedly raped over 2,000 times over the course of a four-year sentence. Additionally, her hair was forcibly cut by another prisoner, and she was not allowed to take her hormone medication.

== Opposition ==
=== Sports ===
In Queensland in April 2022, Katter's Australian Party MP Robbie Katter said he will move a bill to ban transgender athletes from women's sport in the state. In May 2022, he proposed a motion which was voted down 49 votes to 33. The opposition Liberal National Party of Queensland voted with him.

In 2021, a poll conducted by Binary Australia, an organisation that opposes trans women competing in women's sports, found that 67.3% of Australians opposed allowing trans women to compete against cis women. The poll found that only a majority of Greens voters (52.1%) were in favour, while the majority of people who vote for Labor (62.9%), the Liberals (78.3%), the Nationals (79.4%) and One Nation (81.1%) were against. Binary Australia also vigorously campaigns against "gender-neutral or non-binary" birth certificates, sexual reassignment surgeries and other "experimental procedures" on children and minors - including puberty blockers and hormone therapy.

=== Surgery ===
In 2023, Liberal senator for South Australia Alex Antic proposed a bill to ban gender reassignment surgery and treatment for teenagers.

== See also ==
- Human rights in Australia
- Intersex Human Rights Australia
- Intersex rights in Australia
- LGBTQ rights in Australia
- LGBTIQ+ Health Australia
- Name change
- Re Alex
- Re Kevin – validity of marriage of transsexual
- Transgender rights
- Transgender Victoria
- Zoe Belle Gender Collective

== Bibliography ==
- Australian Human Rights Commission (March 2009). Sex Files: the legal recognition of sex in documents and government records. Concluding paper of the sex and gender diversity project. Archived from the original on 17 September 2016.
- Australian Human Rights Commission (2015). Resilient Individuals: Sexual Orientation, Gender Identity & Intersex Rights National Consultation Report (PDF). Archived from the original (PDF) on 4 August 2016.
- Asia Pacific Forum of National Human Rights Institutions (June 2016). Promoting and Protecting Human Rights in relation to Sexual Orientation, Gender Identity and Sex Characteristics. ISBN 978-0-9942513-7-4. Archived from the original on 15 January 2017.
