= Tuck shop =

Food-selling retailer

A school tuck shop based on a redundant vehicle, Surrey, England

A tuck shop is a small retailer located either within or close to the grounds of a school, hospital, apartment complex, or other similar facility. In traditional British usage, tuck shops are associated chiefly with the sale of confectionery, sweets, or snacks and are common at private ('fee-paying') schools. Tuck shops located within a campus are often the only place where monetary transactions may be made by students. As such, they may also sell items of stationery or other related school items. In some regions, the words 'tuck shop' may be interchangeable with a 'canteen'. The term is used in many parts of the Anglosphere outside of the United Kingdom.

In Australia, at youth clubs, campsites, and schools, the tuck shop is mainly staffed by volunteers from the community, which may include students, parents and, in the case of clubs, its members. The term is also used in Indian boarding schools, notably in Bangalore Military School. In Canada, summer camps often have tuck shops for the same reason, to allow campers to buy small items while away from home. Some hospitals in Canada also have tuck shops, though it is more common for them to be called gift shops. Tuck shops in a long-term care facility typically sell personal hygiene items such as razors, soap, and shampoo.

== Etymology ==
The term "tuck", meaning food, is slang and probably originates from such phrases as "to tuck into a meal". It is closely related to the Australian English word "tucker", meaning food. A tuck shop typically sells confectionery, sandwiches, and finger-food, such as sweets, crisps, soft drinks, and such. Recently there have been moves to change to a wider variety of "healthier" foods. In Australia, where the tuck shop will typically be the only source of bought food at the school/club, the menu is more substantial and is more similar to the school dinners provided by the British government.

"Tucker" may originate with the lacework at the top of 19th-century women's dresses, but the origin of its use in regard to food probably arises from the popular shops run in England by various members of the Tuck family between 1780 and 1850. The earliest reference found is to Thomas Tuck whose "Tuck's Coffee House" in Norwich was popular among the city's literary circles in the late 18th century. There was a library for the use of customers, and it was located on Gentleman's Walk in the heart of the city. It is mentioned as a place of legal negotiation in public notices published in the Norfolk Chronicle on 9 February 1782 and 12 and 19 April 1783. In 1820, William Joseph Tuck was a confectioner at Duncan Place, Hackney, outside London. Hackney and nearby London Fields were fashionable for picnic outings and holidays at the time. The London Directory of 1846 records his son Thomas James Tuck as a baker at "The Bun House" in Duncan Place. Edward Walford in his Old and New London: Volume 5 of 1879 says: "In the short thoroughfare connecting the London Fields with Goldsmiths' Row there is a shop which in bygone times was almost as much noted for its 'Hackney Buns' as the well-known Bun-house at Chelsea was for that particular kind of pastry."

Another store had also opened by 1842 in Church Street, now Mare Street, as shown in a painting in which "TUCK" is clearly displayed over the door. Thomas and his brother William Frederick Tuck arrived in Victoria, Australia aboard Ayrshire on 24 April 1852, and both opened similar stores, William as a confectioner in Melbourne and Thomas at the goldfields. "T J Tuck & Sons" is shown over the door of his store in the painting by Augustus Baker Peirce: "The Myers Creek Rush – near Sandhurst (Bendigo) Victoria" (located in the National Library of Australia in Canberra).

== Use of the term ==
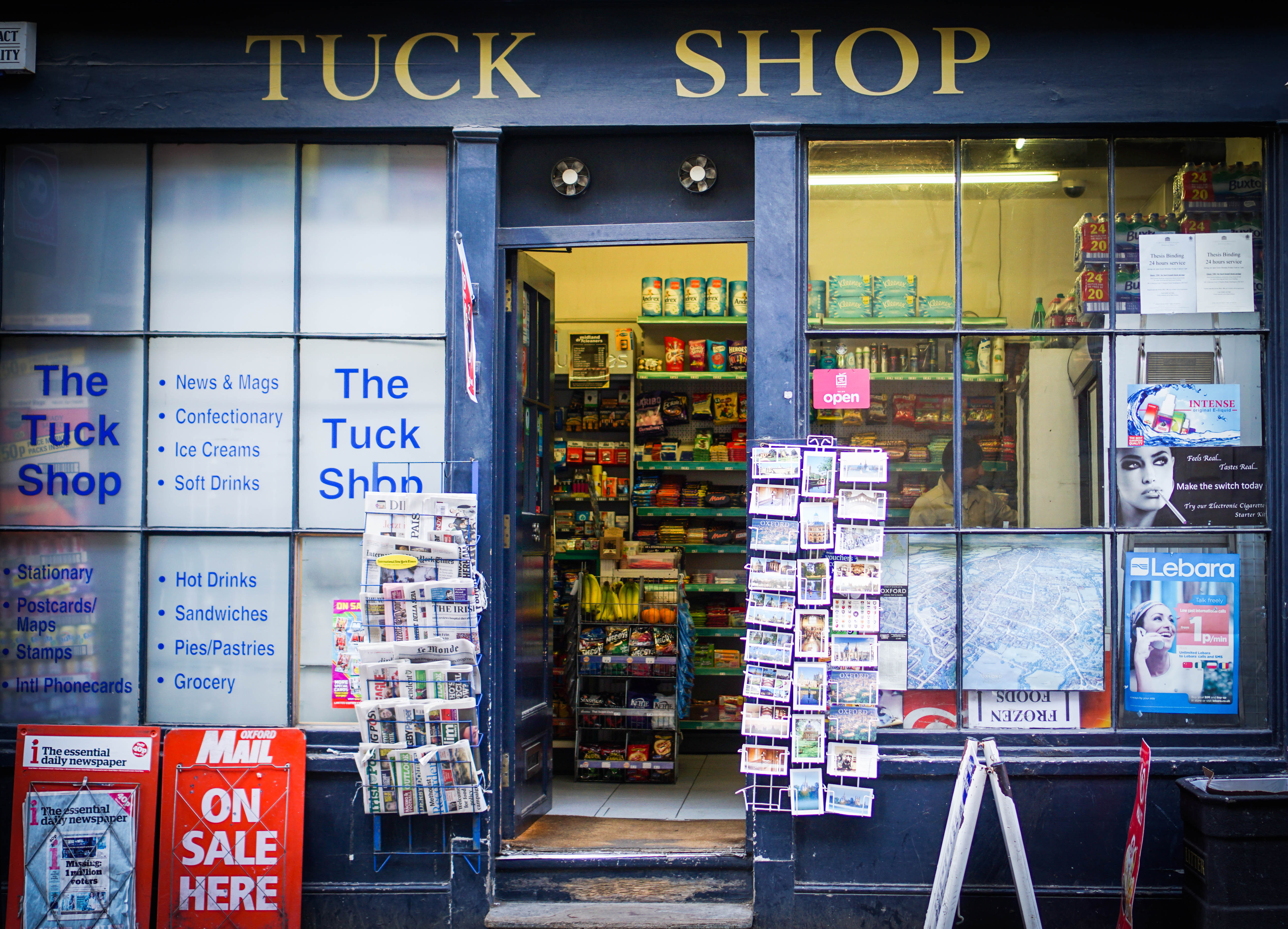
"The Tuck Shop", a convenience store in Oxford, England

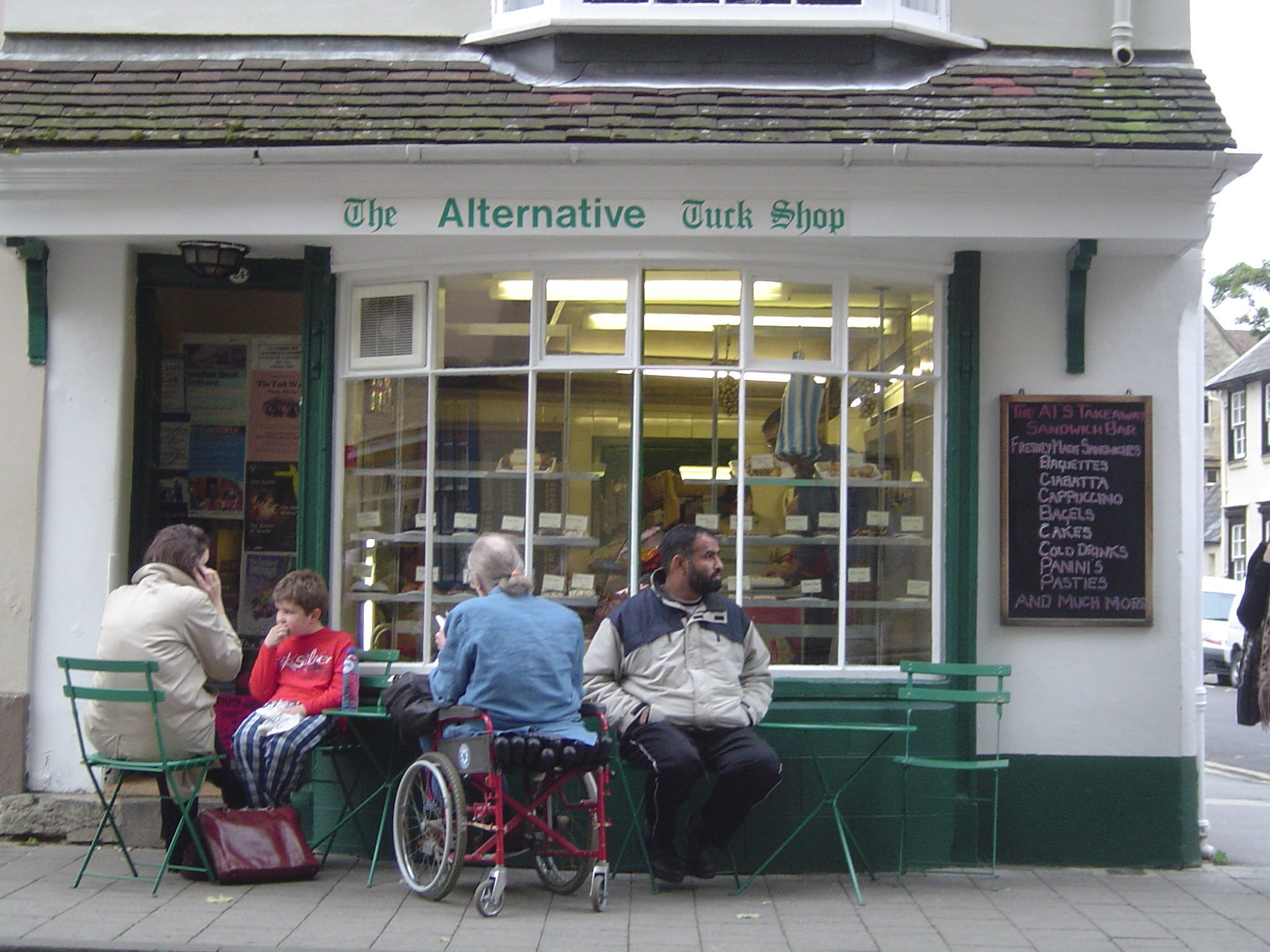
"The Alternative Tuck Shop", a sandwich bar, also in Oxford

Advertisers and retailers have used the name and image of a tuck shop many times to promote products or to promote a nostalgic sense of familiarity. Some shops have simply called themselves "The Tuck Shop" or further shortened to "The Tucky". For example, on Holywell Street in Oxford, there is "The Tuck Shop" and further down the street, there is "The Alternative Tuck Shop" (see photo).

== Healthy tuck shops ==
As part of the UK government's promotion of healthy eating as part of a healthy lifestyle, the role of food and drink sales in schools has come under increasing scrutiny. As such, national, regional and local government have been strongly promoting the idea of "healthy" tuck shops. There has also been charity and voluntary sector involvement. To some, that means providing healthier types of the same goods (for example using brown bread instead of white, selling milk and fruit juice instead of fizzy drinks and rice cakes and crackers instead of crisps). This model has become popular with the authorities in many schools in the UK. Some groups have advocated going even further and creating a "fruit tuck shop". These have been less successful, primarily due to a perceived drop in revenue. Such projects may well not be popular with their customers (the schoolchildren themselves) who do not like the food on offer and prefer to buy other food from local stores, despite attempts by teachers to prevent this, and a school's food supply operation may become unviable as a result.

In Queensland, Australia the State Government introduced in 2007 a basic "traffic-light system" across all school canteens, public and private. Green-category foods (fruit, vegetables, water, grains and nuts, etc.) are unrestricted. Yellow foods (some sweets, fruit juice) are meant to be consumed only about 3–4 times per month. Red foods (lollies, processed meals, soft drinks) are limited to at most twice per term (usually 10 weeks).

== See also ==
- Bodega (store)
- Convenience store (corner shop)
- Snack bar
