= Transcend Australia =

Australian transgender charity

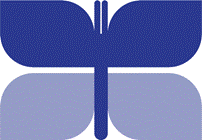
- Formation: 2012
- Founder: Rebekah Robertson
- Type: Non-governmental organisation
- Registration no.: ABN 38637199056
- Legal status: Registered charity
- Headquarters: Victoria, Australia
- Region served: Australia
- Services: Advocacy; Support groups
- CEO: Susanne Prosser
- Chair: Tara Laursen
- Key people: Rebekah Robertson; Georgie Stone; Susanne Prosser (CEO) and other responsible people of the registered charity
- Website: transcend.org.au

Transcend Australia (Transcend) is a national community-led organisation, and a registered charity providing education, peer support and advocacy services to Australian families of trans, gender diverse and non-binary people. Founded in 2012 by actor and advocate Rebekah Robertson after she found little curated information when seeking to support her daughter Georgie. As a result resources were developed to support transgender, gender diverse, and non-binary (TGDNB) children, young people, and their families. Transcend continues to support families and carers who have TGDNB children of all ages. Their current financials and documents are published on ACNC.

== History ==
Transcend was the first parent-led support group and information hub in Australia for gender diverse children and their parents. As an information hub, the website provides information about where to find support and information specific to the Australian reader's location (State and City), details on how to access treatment and how to look after a gender diverse child (for parents) as well as specific support services for the child themselves. Furthermore, the website also lists contact details for different services and specialists nationwide. The 'latest news' section contains various links to articles or media pieces that relate to trans issues including advocacy through subscription.

"Because of the stress, anxiety and the time limit of puberty and court together... transgender people and their families are pushed to the limit,"

— Robertson on the court process

In 2014, Transcend began raising money for the Royal Children's Hospital Gender Service, a service that provides help for transgender children and support for families. In 2016 Georgie and Rebekah were featured in ABC's Australian Story "About a Girl". From July 2017, over $30,000 has been raised. Since their appearance on Four Corners. From 2018 Transcend began to focus more on advocacy and law reform surrounding access to stage-two treatment, as opposed to being a support group. Robertson was nominated for Straight Ally of the Year at the GLOBE Community Awards in 2016, but lost to Matt Finnis from St Kilda Football Club.
In 2019, Transcend Australia became incorporated and has since then operated as a charity registered on the ACNC. It continues to operate in support of thousands of families in Australia and to advocate to enhance protective factors and opportunities to ensure trans, gender diverse and non-binary (TGDNB) people have opportunities to thrive and flourish.

== Awards and nominations ==
Patron and office bearer (as executive or director) past and present:

Year	Organisation	Award	Work	Result	Ref
2016	GLOBE Victoria	Victoria LGBTI Person of the Year award	Georgie Stone	Won	
2018	GLOBE Victoria	Victoria LGBTI Person of the Year award	Jeremy Wiggins	Won	
2018	Victoria	Young Australian of the Year	Georgie Stone	Nominated	
2019	GLOBE Community Awards	Straight Ally of the Year	Rebekah Robertson	Nominated	
2018	Australian LGBTI Awards	Community Initiative / Charity	Transcend	Nominated	
2022	Globe Community Awards	Improving Health and Wellbeing	Transcend Australia	Won	

== Affiliations ==
Transcend Australia collaborates with or is a member of:

- LGBTIQ+ Health Australia
- AusPATH
- Queensland Mental Health Commission
- Royal Children's Hospital Melbourne
- Victorian Government

== See also ==
- Transgender rights in Australia
