= Greg Stone =

Australian actor (born 1961)

- Born: Gregory Jonathon Stone; 23 June 1961 (age 65); Perth, Western Australia
- Education: National Institute of Dramatic Art
- Occupation: Actor
- Years active: 1984–present
- Spouse: Rebekah Robertson (m. 1999; sep. 2013)
- Children: 2, including Georgie

Gregory "Greg" Jonathon Stone (born 23 June 1961) is an Australian actor who has appeared in films, television and on stage.

== Early life ==
Stone was born in Perth, Western Australia to parents Roy and Jennifer Stone. He grew up in Fremantle with his two siblings.

He graduated from the National Institute of Dramatic Art in Sydney in 1983.

== Career ==
=== Film and television ===
Stone's notable film roles include The Bank (2001) with David Wenham and Anthony LaPaglia, Van Diemen's Land (2009), Oranges and Sunshine (2010) with Emily Watson and Hugo Weaving and The Sunset Six (2013).

In 2023, Stone was announced in the cast for ABC comedy series White Fever.

=== Theatre ===
Considered one of Australia's finest stage actors, he has appeared in over 90 productions for many companies including Melbourne Theatre Company, Sydney Theatre Company, State Theatre Company of South Australia, Belvoir, Malthouse Theatre, Playbox Theatre Company, Black Swan State Theatre Company, Bell Shakespeare, Griffin Theatre Company and Q Theatre.

He was nominated for Green Room Awards for his performances in Angels in America, Good Works, A Little Night Music, The Beauty Queen of Leenane, Beneath Heaven, Night a Wall 2 Men, Blackbird (also a Helpmann nomination) and Clybourne Park. He also won a Helpmann Award and Green Room Award for Best Actor, for his role of George W. Bush in David Hare’s Stuff Happens, directed by Neil Armfield in 2006.

He was a founding member of the acclaimed Keene/Taylor Theatre Project and Artistic Associate at Playbox Theatre in 2004.

=== Music ===
Stone is the lead singer of the glam rock band Melody Lords.

== Personal life ==
Stone married Rebekah Robertson in 1999. They have two children, Georgie and Harry Stone. In 2013 they separated and at some point divorced.

== Stage ==
Year	Title	Role	Notes
1984	Twelfth Night	Various	STCSA
1984	Captain Bloody	Various roles	Australian Elizabethan Theatre Trust
1984	West Coast Romeo	Jade	Harvest Rain Theatre Company
1984, 1986	Are You Lonesome Tonight	Jesse	Q Theatre & Western Australia Theatre Company
1985	Dancing in the Street	Ali	TOE Truck Theatre Company
1985	Reedy River	Performer	Q Theatre
1986	Much Ado About Nothing	Performer	Shakespeare in the Park
1986	Hamlet	Horatio	Q Theatre
1986	McNeil	Stanley	Griffin Theatre Company
1987	All the Black Dogs	Robin	Griffin Theatre Company
1988	Manning Clark's History of Australia	MacArthur / Lawson	
1989	Living in the 70s	Shane	
1989	Summer Rain	Mick	STC
1992	The Emperor Regrets	Doherty	Playbox Theatre Company
1993	Buddy - The Buddy Holly Story	Various	New Zealand tour
1993	The Eye of Martha Needle	Herman Juncken	La Mama
1993–1994	Angels in America	Joseph Porter Pitt	MTC
1995	Assassins	Leon Czolgosz	MTC
1995	Lady Windermere's Fan	Mr Hopper	MTC
1995	Head of Mary	Momozono	Playbox Theatre Company & Tokyo tour
1995, 1996	Good Works	Shane / Neil	Playbox Theatre Company & Australian national tour
1996	The Black Sequin Dress	The Waiter	Playbox Theatre Company
1996	Merrily We Roll Along	Charley Kringas	STC
1997	Don's Party	Don	STCSA
1997–1998	A Little Night Music	Count Magnus	MTC and tour
1997–2000	Keene/Taylor Theatre-Project	Performer	Melbourne Fringe Festival
1998	Miracles	Various	Playbox Theatre Company
1998	Chicago, Chicago	Lead	NYID
1999	Miss Saigon	Chris Scott	US national tour
1999	Born Yesterday	Paul Verrall	MTC
1999	A Return to the Brink	Nathaniel QuinnColin	Playbox Theatre Company
1999–2000	The Beauty Queen of Leenane	Pato	STC & tour
2000	Trelawny of the 'Wells'	Ferdinand Gadd	MRC
2001	The Seagull	Medvedenko	MTC
2001	How to Succeed in Business Without Really Trying	Bert Bratt	The Production Company
2001–2002	Stones in His Pockets	Jake	STC, MTC & tour
2002	Rapture	Harry	Playbox Theatre Company
2002	Cloud 9	Joshua / Gerry	MTC
2003	Myth, Propaganda and Disaster in Nazi Germany and Contemporary America	The Man	Playbox Theatre Company
2004	Julia 3	Joe	Playbox Theatre Company
2005	War of the Roses	York/Rivers	Bell Shakespeare
2005	Stuff Happens	George W. Bush	Belvoir Theatre Company
2006	Honk If You Are Jesus	Rev. Hollis Shultz	STCSA
2006	Eldorado	Anton	Malthouse Theatre
2006	The Winter's Tale	Leontes	The Eleventh Hour Theatre
2007	The Pillowman	Ariel	MTC
2007	Life x3	Henri	Black Swan State Theatre Company
2007	The Madwoman of Chaillot	Various	MTC
2008	Love Song	Harry	MTC
2008	Who's Afraid of Virginia Woolf?	George	Black Swan State Theatre Company
2008	Blackbird	Ray	MTC
2008	The Lower Depths	The Actor	Ariette Taylor Productions
2009	Poor Boy	Sol	MTC, STC
2010	The Berry Man	Eric	HotHouse Theatre
2010	Life Without Me	John	MTC
2011	A Golem Story	Guard	MTC
2011	Clybourne Park	Russ / Dan	MTC
2012	Babyteeth	Henry	Belvoir Theatre Company
2012	Queen Lear	Albany	MTC
2012	Pompeii LA	Various roles	Malthouse Theatre
2013	The Crucible	Reverend Paris	MTC
2013	Hamlet	Polonius	Belvoir Theatre Company
2014	The Government Inspector	Performer	Malthouse Theatre; Belvoir Theatre Company
2014	Glengarry Glen Ross	Dave Moss	MTC
2014–2015	Once	Da	
2015	The Waiting Room	Alan Trounson / Eros	MTC
2015	The Weir	Finbar	MTC
2016	Funny Girl	Tom Keeney	The Production Company
2016–2017	Ladies in Black	Mr Miles / Stefan	QTC
2017	Hir	Arnold	Belvoir Theatre Company
2018	Oklahoma!	Ike Skidmore	The Production Company
2018	A Doll's House, Part 2	Torvald	MTC
2019	Cloudstreet	Lester Lamb	Malthouse Theatre; Black Swan State Theatre Company
2019	Australian Realness	Dad	Malthouse Theatre

== Filmography ==
=== Film ===
Year	Title	Role	Notes
1988	Kokoda Crescent	Sergeant	
1990	Sparks		
1992	The Surrogate	Detective Hill	
1998	Two Girls and a Baby	Phillip	
1999	Wednesdays	John	
2001	The Bank	Vincent	
2006	William	Vincent	
2006	BoyTown	Air Traffic Controller	
2007	The Bloody Sweet Hit	Ambo 2	
2008	Hell's Gates	William Kennerly	
2009	Van Diemen's Land	William Kennerly	
2011	Oranges & Sunshine	Bob	
2011	Swerve	Publican	
2011	Husband, Father, Son	Father	
2013	The Sunset Six	Riff	
2015	Is This the Real World	Mr. Rickard	
2016	The Waterfall	Peter	
2017	Boy Saviour	Doctor	
2022	The Stranger	RSL Announcer	

=== Television ===
Year	Title	Role	Notes	Ref.
1984	Five Mile Creek	Guest	1 episode	
1985	Rafferty's Rules	Guest	1 episode	
1985	Shout! The Story of Johnny O'Keefe	Deejay Doublebass	Miniseries, 2 episodes	
1985	The Visitor	Peregrine	TV movie	
1987, 1991	A Country Practice	Shaun / Hans Vandersluys	Guest role – season 7, episodes 75 & 76: "What's Love Got to Do With It: Part 1" & "What's Love Got To Do With It: Part 2"; Guest role – aeason 11, episode 50: "Day By Day: Part 2"	
1988	E Street	Warren Green	1 episode	
1989	G.P.	Bruce	1 episode	
1989	Skirts	Morgan	1 episode	
1991	Boys from the Bush	Sydney	1 episode	
1991	Chances	Guest	1 episode	
1992	Phoenix II	Det. Inspector Miller	Guest role, season 2, episode 11: "Under Siege"	
1995	Snowy River: The McGregor Saga	Dr. Cameron	Guest role, season 2, episode 3: "The Railroad"	
1994, 1997, 2001, 2003-2004	Blue Heelers	Ron Blakely / Geoff 'Shorty' Abbott / Gerry Howson / Ivan Long / Bryan Reynolds	Guest role, season 1, episode 13: "Armed & Dangerous"; Guest role;, season 4, episodes 37 & 38: "Collateral Damage" & "The Big Picture"; Guest role, season 8, episodes 18 & 19: "Falling Apart: Part 1" & "Falling Apart: Part 2"; Guest role, season 10, episode 9: "Bumps in the Night"; Guest role, season 11, episode 26: "Life Goes On"	
1994, 2012, 2016	Neighbours	Aaron O'Connor / Bryce Unwin / Walter Mitchell	Recurring role, season 1, 3 episodes; Guest role, season 1, episode 6339; Large guest role, season 1, 18 episodes	
1995	Janus	Ed Mann	Guest role, season 2, episode 2: "Suicide by Cop"	
1997	Good Guys, Bad Guys	Steve Mason	Guest role, season 1, episode 1: "Storm Warning"	
1998	SeaChange	Matthew Reilley	Guest role, season 1, episode 4: "The Official Story"	
1998	State Coroner	Sgt. Frank Johnson	Guest role, season 2, episode 10: "Assumptions"	
1999	Halifax f.p.	Leon Finke	Guest role, season 1, episode 14: "A Murder of Crows"	
1999	Horace and Tina	Mr. Birdwood	Guest role, season 1, episode 22: "Dancing Partners"	
2000, 2003	Stingers	Eric O'Neill / Paul Dawson	Guest role, season 3, episode 12: '"In Too Deep'"; Guest role, season 7, episode 8: "Priapus' Playground"	
2002	Shock Jock	Gil	Recurring role, season 2, 5 episodes	
2002	Marshall Law	Judge Don Foster	Supporting role, season 1, 10 episodes	
2003	MDA	Dr Garth Carmody	Guest role, season 2, episode 19: '"Bigger Fish to Fry"	
2005	Nightmares & Dreamscapes: From the Stories of Stephen King	CNN Anchor	Minor role, season 1, episode 6: "The Fifth Quarter"	
2007	The Librarians	Premier Carter	Recurring role, season 1, episodes 3 & 6: "4 Kilos to Book Week" & "And Nothing But The Truth"	
2008	Bed of Roses	Jack Atherton	Minor role, season 1, episode 1: "Not Worth a Cent"	
2008	City Homicide	Dean Palmer	Guest role, season 1, episode 7: "Baby Love"	
2011	Underbelly Files: Tell Them Lucifer was Here	Bandali Debs	TV movie	
2011	Lowdown	Steve Mott	Guest role, season 2, episode 8: "Bubble Trouble"	
2011–2013	Winners & Losers	Steve Gilbert	Recurring role, seasons 1–3, 9 episodes	
2012	Miss Fisher's Murder Mysteries	Mr Sheridan	Guest role, season 1, Episode 11: "Blood and Circuses"	
2012	Devil's Dust	Peter McDonald	Miniseries, 2 episodes	
2013	Better Man	Drennan AFP	Guest role, season 1, episode 2: "Twin Dragons"	
2013	Offspring	Dr Brian	Minor role, season 4, episode 12	
2015	The Ex-PM	Neil Blanchard	Guest role, season 1, episode 4: "Rivalry"	
2015-2017	Glitch	Russel	Recurring role;, seasons 1–2, 2 episodes	
2016	Secret City	Laidley	Guest role, season 1, episode 4: "Falling Hard"	
2016	Australian Story	Himself	Documentary	
2017	Newton's Law	Judge Greg Halliday	Guest role, season 1, episode 5: "Law of Cooling"	
2017	The Doctor Blake Mysteries	Professor Worthington	Guest role, season 5	
2021	Jack Irish	Joe Slorach	4 episodes	
2019, 2021	Ms Fisher's Modern Murder Mysteries	Chief Inspector Percy Sparrow	Recurring role, 12 episodes	
2023	Utopia	Historian	1 episode	
2024	White Fever	Jack Thomas	5 episodes	
2024	Fake	Peter Van Rotterdam	Episode 1.8	
2024	Fisk	Johnny	1 episode	
2025	Return to Paradise	TBA		

== Awards and nominations ==
Year	Organisation	Award	Work	Result
1995	Green Room Awards	Best Male Performer	Angels in America	Nominated
1997	Green Room Awards	Best Male Supporting Performer	A Little Night Music	Nominated
1998	Green Room Awards	Best Actor on the Melbourne Fringe	Keene/Taylor Project #2	Nominated
2001	Green Room Awards	Best Male Performer	The Beauty Queen of Leenane	Nominated
2005	Green Room Awards	Best Male Performer	Stuff Happens	Won
2006	Helpmann Awards	Best Male Actor in a Play	Stuff Happens	Won
2007	Green Room Awards	Best Male Performer	Winter's Tale	Nominated
2009	Green Room Awards	Best Male Performer	Blackbird	Nominated
2009	Helpmann Awards	Best Male Actor in a Play	Blackbird	Nominated
2011	Green Room Awards	Best Male Performer	Clybourne Park	Nominated
2012	Indie Gems Film Festival Awards	Best Male Actor	The Sunset Six	Won
2014	Green Room Awards	Best Theatre Company Ensemble	The Government Inspector	Nominated
2015	Green Room Awards	Best Ensemble Cast in a Musical	Once	Won
2015	Madrid International Film Festival Awards	Best Supporting Actor	Is This The Real World?	Nominated
