= Roberta Perkins =

Australian sociologist and trans rights activist

- Born: April 30, 1940; Australia
- Died: 26 June 2018 (aged 78); Sydney
- Occupations: Sociologist, writer, transgender and sex workers' rights advocacy

Roberta Perkins (30 April 1940 – 26 June 2018) was an Australian sociologist, writer, and transgender rights and sex worker rights activist. She wrote several books and multiple academic articles on the semi-nomadic lives of transgender sex workers, and established the first assistance center for transgender people in Australia.

== Biography ==
Perkins completed her BA honours dissertation at Macquarie University in 1981. Her dissertation surveyed the lives and experiences of drag queens and transsexuals, and it was one of the first ever theses by an openly transgender woman in Australia.

In the 1980s, she was an early member of the then newly created Australian Transsexual Association, which supported trans people by lobbying for social and legal reform. In 1982, she took over from the ATA's founder, Noelena Tame, as its leader.

In 1983, she published her first book, The Drag Queen Scene: Transsexuals in Kings Cross, a survey of 146 drag queens based upon her dissertation. In June 1983, Frank Walker, New South Wales Labor Assembly person and at that time Minister for Youth and Community Services, read the book and invited Perkins to meet. She told him about the poverty, homelessness and violence experienced by transgender sex workers, many of them youths; about the rape, beatings, harassment, and evictions, and how trans women could find no aid in either men's or women's shelters.

Walker understood the gravity of the situation and expressed his commitment to help. As a result, Perkins received an initial grant of AU$57,000 to open a community centre and crisis accommodation service to assist transgender sex workers and homeless trans youth. The first home, originally called "Tiresias House", officially opened on December 12, 1983, in Sydney, providing 12 crisis accommodation beds which were quickly filled. The center quickly grew and, within a few years, included four houses and had both a registered nurse and a community worker on permanent staff. After six years, its name changed to the Gender Centre.

Perkins left the Gender Centre in 1985 to concentrate on writing and publishing books and articles in academic publications about transgender women and sex workers. She was a noted figure in the struggle for sex worker rights in New South Wales and Australia as a whole. She was a founding member of the Australian Prostitutes Collective NSW, which advocated for decriminalization of sex work and for the improvement of sex workers' lives. The collective's work is continued today by the Sex Worker Outreach Project (SWOP) NSW.

Perkins died on 26 June 2018 at the age of 78. Her obituaries called her a "trail-blazer" and "a woman of action" who laid the groundwork for sex worker advocacy in her country, and benefited "countless" trans people and sex workers.

== Publications ==
- The Third Sex and Sanctified Persons: A Cross-Cultural Survey, Comparison and Analysis of Transvestism and Transsexuality. Macquarie University BA Hons Thesis 1981.
- The Drag Queen Scene: Transsexuals in Kings Cross. George Allen & Unwin, 1983.
- With Nikki Searant & Linda Tyne. Transsexualism: An Overview : Understanding the Transsexual. Collective of Australian Transsexuals, Australian Transsexual Association, 1983.
- With Garry Bennett. Being a Prostitute: Prostitute Women and Prostitute Men. Allen & Unwin, 1985.
- A History, Manifesto, and a Report on the Proposed Welfare Services of the Australian Prostitutes' Collective. The Collective, 1985.
- Female Prostitutes in Visible Prostitution in Inner-City Sydney. The author, 1985.
- Female Prostitution in Sydney an Overview: An Information Document on Female Prostitution and Prostitute Women of Sydney. Australian Prostitutes Collective (N.S.W.), 1985.
- "Working Girls": Normality and Diversity Among Female Prostitutes in Sydney. Macquarie University MA Hons Thesis, 1988.
- Interviewed by Phil Jarratt. "The working girl's friend. -Interview with Roberta Perkins, founder of the Australian Prostitutes Collective". Bulletin (Sydney). 140–141,143–144, 13 September 1988.
- "Wicked Women Or Working Girls: The Prostitute on the Silver Screen". Media Information Australia, 51, 1989: 28–34.
- "Working Girls in ‘Wowserville’: Prostitute Women in Sydney Since 1945". In Richard Kennedy. Australian Welfare: Historical Sociology. Macmillan, 1989: 362–389.
- Working Girls: Prostitutes, Their Life and Social Control. Australian Inst. of Criminology, 1991.
- With A. Griffin, & J. Jakobsen. Transgender Lifestyles and HIV/AIDS Risk. University of New South Wales, 1994.
- With G. Prestage, R. Sharp & Frances Lovejoy. Sex Work, Sex Workers in Australia. University of New South Wales Press, 1994.
- With Frances Lovejoy. "Healthy and Unhealthy Life Styles of Female Brothel Workers and Call Girls (Private Sex Workers) in Sydney". Australian and New Zealand Journal of Public Health. 20, 5, 1996: 512–6.
- “The Drag Queen Scene: Transsexuals in Kings Cross". In Richard Ekins & Dave King (eds). Blending Genders: Social Aspects of Cross-Dressing and Sex-Changing. Routledge 1996: 53–62.
- With Frances Lovejoy. Call Girls: Private Sex Workers in Australia. University of Western Australia Press, 2007.

== See also ==
- Transgender rights in Australia
- Sex workers' rights
