= Recognised details certificate =

In Australia, a recognised details certificate (identity acknowledgment certificate in South Australia) is a vital record issued by a state or territory's Registry of Births, Marriages, and Deaths, certifying that a person not born in that state or territory has recorded a change of gender with the Registry. The document is equivalent to Gender recognition certificates in other countries.

== See also ==
- Transgender rights in Australia
