= Stuff Happens =

Play written by David Hare

Stuff Happens is a play by David Hare, written in response to the Iraq War. Hare describes it as "a history play" that deals with recent history. The title is inspired by Donald Rumsfeld's response to widespread looting in Baghdad: "Stuff happens and it’s untidy, and freedom’s untidy, and free people are free to make mistakes and commit crimes and do bad things.” (April 11, 2003)

The play presents a mix of viewpoints, including arguments for and against the attack on Iraq. It mixes verbatim re-creations of real speeches, meetings, press conferences and fictionalized versions of private meetings between members of the Bush and Blair administrations. The play also includes international figures such as Hans Blix and Dominique de Villepin. An ensemble cast plays over 40 roles during the 3-hour play, although the actors playing the principals—Bush, Rice, Powell—play only one role.

In 2020, Andy Propst of Time Out dubbed Stuff Happens "one of the most impressive political dramas to emerge in recent memory" and ranked it the 30th greatest play of all time.

== Characters ==
George W. Bush	President of the United States
Dick Cheney	Vice-President of the United States
Donald Rumsfeld	American Secretary of Defense
Colin Powell	Secretary of State
Condoleezza Rice	National Security Advisor
Paul Wolfowitz	Deputy Secretary of Defense
Tony Blair	Prime Minister of United Kingdom
Hans Blix	Executive Chairman of the United Nations Monitoring, Verification and Inspection Commission
George Tenet	Director of Central Intelligence
Laura Bush	First Lady of the United States
Jack Straw	Secretary of State for Foreign and Commonwealth Affairs
Jonathan Powell	Downing Street Chief of Staff
Alastair Campbell	Downing Street Director of Communications and Strategy
Michael Gerson	White House Director of Speechwriting
Saddam Hussein	President of Iraq
David Manning	UK Permanent Representative on the North Atlantic Council/ British Ambassador to the United States
Sir Richard Dearlove	Head of the British Secret Intelligence Service
John Negroponte	United States Ambassador to the United Nations
Jeremy Greenstock	Chairman of the Security Council's Counter-Terrorism Committee
Igor Ivanov	Foreign minister of Russia
Sergey Lavrov	Permanent Representative of Russia to the United Nations
Dominique de Villepin	Minister of Foreign Affairs
Jean-David Levitte	Ambassador of France to the United States
John McCain	Chairman of the Senate Commerce Committee
Mohamed ElBaradei	Director General of the International Atomic Energy Agency
Dan Bartlett	Head of the White House Communications Team
Jacques Chirac	President of France
Robin Cook	Leader of the House of Commons
Ari Fleischer	White House Press Secretary
Jeremy Paxman	British Journalist

== Plot and Style ==
David Hare's Stuff Happens is a play about the events that led up to the 2003 Iraq War. The play focuses on the diplomatic side of the war. The play begins at George Bush's election in November 2000 and ends around April 2004. Parts of the dialogue are direct quotes from the characters' real-world counterparts. The play is about real people and real events that had occurred. Hare states that "the events within [the play] have been authenticated from multiple sources, both private and public." Hare also stated that the dialogue is not “knowingly untrue” but he had to sometimes “use his imagination” to cover events that were not recorded verbatim, admitting that his play is not a documentary as such. The events during the play are as follows:

Act One-

Scene 1 through 3: These scenes serve as an introduction to the play and the characters. Scene 3 focuses specifically on background information on the main characters before the plot begins.

Scene 4: The National Security Council starts the meeting talking about the issues in the Middle East, specifically what's going on between the Israelis and the Palestinians. After talking briefly about this issue, Bush then wants to shift the conversation towards Iraq. The CIA believe that Iraq has a plant at an abandoned warehouse to produce chemical or biological weapons. Since there isn't enough proof, they are told to look more into the issue.

Scene 5: This whole scene is about an angry journalist. The journalist rants about how Americans ignore how lucky they are to be able to have freedom and instead, they choose to fight with each other and disagree with each other constantly.

Scene 6: Hare describes how the events of 9/11 happen. He gives the exact times the planes crashed into the twin towers and the Pentagon. It is also explained that the 4th plane was meant to hit the White House but the passengers were able to prevent that from happening. This is what started the War on Terror between "the free and democratic world and terrorism."

Scene 7: The War Cabinet meets at Camp David to discuss future plans going forward. They decide that Afghanistan can be used as an example to show other countries what happens if they try to use terrorism on other countries. Wolfowitz and Rumsfeld believe that the U.S. should take action on Iraq since it will be less of a risk than Afghanistan and still be able to send a message to other countries. Wolfowitz believes that Saddam Hussein is involved with what happened on 9/11.

Scene 8: Bush signs orders to attack Afghanistan with British support. Air strikes attack 31 different Al Qaeda and Taliban targets. When the British were able to track down Bin Laden, they were ordered to pull out which gave him the chance to go into a different hiding spot off the radar. Bush then talks to Rumsfeld privately to discuss going to war with Iraq.

Scene 9: A politician states that the attack on Iraq was controversial and possibly illegal. The British decide that they will no longer back up America after these actions because they believe there wasn't a legal cause for attacking Iraq.

Scene 10: It is believed that Iraq was a terrorist ally that was a threat to America. Other countries aren’t taking Bush seriously and don't believe he knows what he is doing. Bush and Blair meet privately at Bush's ranch to discuss the problems regarding the Middle East. Bush believes that since Afghanistan is done they should just move on to Iraq as a second phase. Blair tries convincing Bush that the support from the UN is needed before they can invade Iraq. The British need evidence that Iraq is actually a threat in order to be able to invade them legally. After their conversation, Bush says to the press that the removal of Saddam is the main goal with his government.

Scene 11: Bush believes that since there are new styles of threats since the UN Charter was created, that means there should be new ways of thinking. Powell meets with Bush and says how he believes that if the U.S. goes in to Iraq without the UN then the U.S. will be in trouble. Powell says that invading will make America look like a dictatorship and put our allies in trouble.

Act 2-

Scene 12: The NSC reassembles and Cheney says that the story should be known as the “Crisis at the UN” so that it is no longer about America's wrongdoing but instead makes it about the UN and whether they can deliver or not.

Scene 13: Palestinians believe that the UN is a double standard because the UN only does things that benefit themselves but ignore what benefits the countries outside of the UN. The UN condemns the idea of terrorism but they allow the countries in the Middle East to murder themselves.

Scene 14: Cheney states on a TV studio that defeating Iraq would be a crucial hit to the base of terrorism before terrorism is able to escalate to nuclear weapons. Blair is still frustrated because he can't legally allow Britain to go to war because there isn't enough evidence of there being a threat. Blair then tries to get enough information from his resources in order to get enough evidence to make an invasion legal. Bush addresses to the general assembly that the first time the world finds out that Saddam has nuclear weapons will be when he uses one and it becomes too late.

Scene 15: Powell meets with some members of the UN to discuss Iraq and Saddam. De Villepin thinks that the U.S. decided on the process to invade Iraq without coming up with the purpose for it. The U.S. have been leaving out other countries when it comes to their decisions for the last two years so the rest of the UN are cautious when it comes to making plans with the U.S. The French will help the U.S. if their goal is to disarm Saddam but won't help if the goal is to fully invade Iraq.

Scene 16: The House voted 296 to 133 which allows Bush to deploy armed forces when it is necessary and appropriate. The British Parliament believe that Bush will prematurely attack Iraq just to gain more power and oil. Bush however says that he wants to go through the UN and only disarm Saddam, he doesn't want there to be a war. The U.S. and the French agree to having the “Resolution 1441” which allows any member state to defend itself against the threat of Iraq.

Scene 17: Iraq inspectors commit to produce a full description of their chemical facilities. Saddam won't admit that he has the deadly weapons that the UN are looking for. There is controversy in Britain because some people believe that the Britain should be able to help the U.S. and some say that they should wait. Blair has no idea what his further actions are because Saddam wasn't any help and Blair has to keep calling Bush.

Scene 18: This scene is about the option of a British person on the United States. The person goes on about how America is attacking an area where there are no terrorist connections instead of going after the area where there is a known connection.

Scene 19: The French make a secret offer to the U.S. that if there are no more resolutions brought up at the UN, then the French will drop their opposition on the war. Powell doesn't think the U.S. should act without talking about it with Blair first. The U.S. then rejects the offer by the French.

Scene 20: Rumsfeld thinks the U.S. should stop listening to the European countries because the Europeans care more about how the U.S. will react rather than Saddam. Debate breaks out among the American officials about whether the UN is useful and if they should wait on Blair to get permission from him in order to carry out their actions. Bush becomes worried that the British government might end up collapsing. Powell will be in charge of giving the presentation to the UN showing the powerful case the U.S. has for going to war.

Scene 21: There have been over 400 inspections across over 300 different sites and there still hasn't been any sign of Iraq having any weapons capable of mass destruction. The UN inspectors need time in order to be able to successfully complete their mission. There are 100 million people protesting across 600 cities demanding that the inspectors get more time to finish their mission instead of just going straight to war.

Scene 22: Britain, Spain, and the U.S. agree to have a new resolution which allows authorization to use force. They need votes from the Security Council in order to successfully pass the resolution. The British would benefit from putting the statement of the new resolution out the next day because it is believed that no matter the circumstance, the French would vote no on it which would get rid of the second resolution all together without it being the Britain's fault. Blair announces that the attempts to pass the new resolution will no longer continue because Chirac provided pointless diplomacy. Bush commits to working towards peace between Israel and Palestine in order to help the British Parliament survive. Right before dawn in Baghdad, the air raid sirens were a sign that the war was just beginning.

Scene 23: This scene is the ending scene that portrays the aftermath of the Iraq War. The military campaign ends after just 42 days. It will cost nearly a trillion dollars in order to reconstruct Iraq. Powell resigns from the administration during the next election. In an interview, Powell admits that the facts they were given at the time of action, ended up being wrong.

Scene 24: This scene is the last scene in the play. It focuses on an Iraqi exile. The Iraqi generally states that the American dead are more honored than the dead of the Iraqis. The Iraqi also states that Iraq was crucified for Saddam Hussein's sins and that the people of Iraq are to blame because they didn't take charge of their own country, which allowed Saddam to take control of Iraq.

== Production history ==
Stuff Happens had its world premiere at the Olivier Theatre at the National Theatre in London on 1 September 2004 and has subsequently been performed at Los Angeles' Mark Taper Forum (with Keith Carradine and Julian Sands) in June 2005 and at Sydney's Seymour Centre (with Rhys Muldoon and Greg Stone) in July 2005. Greg Stone won a Helpmann Award for Best Male Actor in a Play in 2006.

It debuted Off-Broadway on 28 March 2006 at the Public Theater and closed on 25 June 2006. The cast featured Jeffrey DeMunn as Donald Rumsfeld, Zach Grenier as Dick Cheney, Peter Francis James as Colin Powell and Byron Jennings as Tony Blair. Director Daniel Sullivan chose a small venue at the Newman Theater at the Public. This created an atmosphere such “as if the audience too is participating in this re-creation of recent events”. The production won the 2006 Drama Desk Award, Outstanding Ensemble; 2006 Outer Critics Circle Award, Outstanding Off-Broadway Play; and 2005-2006 OBIE Awards for Performance, Peter Francis James, Performance, Byron Jennings and Direction, Daniel Sullivan.

A one-off revival of the play took place as a rehearsed reading at the National Theatre to mark the release of the Chilcot inquiry on July 6, 2016. Directed by David Hare, the production featured Alex Jennings returning to the role of George W. Bush, Julian Sands returning as Tony Blair and Bill Nighy as the Narrator.
