= Re Kevin =

Australian court case

Re Kevin – Validity of Marriage of a Transsexual was a 2001 Australian court case brought before the Full Court of the Family Court of Australia regarding the possibility of transsexual people to marry according to their new sex. The court granted the applicant this right.

The case had impacts beyond Australia: for example, it was cited in the 2002 decision Goodwin v. United Kingdom of the European Court of Human Rights and the 2003 Michael Kantaras decision of the United States Court of Appeals for the Sixth Circuit. In both of these cases, the right to marry in their new sex was affirmed.

== Background ==
At the time of Re Kevin, same-sex marriage was illegal in Australia. This case regards a transsexual man, using the alias of Kevin for this trial, who had married his wife under the assumption that the definition of man included transsexual men. The Attorney General affirmed that Kevin and his wife (alias Jennifer) were not legally able to get married as they had both been assigned the sex female at birth. The case went to court in Australian Family Court in 2001, with the parties being the Attorney General, Kevin, and the Human Rights and Equal Opportunity Commission. The Attorney General rested his case on the earlier ruling of Corbett v Corbett (Otherwise Ashley) (1971), which stated that sex was decided by biology at birth. The judge in this trial (Chisholm J) determined that measure to be insufficient, as it ignored the role of social and psychological aspects of gender. Ultimately, Chisholm J ruled that Kevin was, in the modern definition of the word, a man. This ruling was later used to affirm in other cases worldwide the marriage of transsexual people as the sex they identify with.

== Filing and arguments ==
The issue in the case was the definition of the word "man" in terms of marriage. At the time of Re Kevin (2001), same sex marriage was still illegal in Australia. Kevin had been assigned female at birth, but had identified as male since childhood. As an adult, Kevin attempted to get married but the Attorney General appealed the marriage. He pointed to the earlier ruling of Corbett v Corbett (Otherwise Ashley) (1971), which ruled that sex is determined at birth by chromosomes, gonads and genitals. The judge in that ruling, Omrod J, decided that a transsexual male could not fulfill the role of a wife. The Attorney General attempted to use this ruling in the case of Re Kevin. Kevin and the Human Rights and Equal Opportunity Commission brought forth evidence to counter this. They based their arguments on proving to the judge that Kevin was, in all aspects of his life, male. Kevin had, at the time of his marriage, had surgeries to remove both primary and secondary female sexual characteristics, as well as hormone therapy. After these surgeries, Kevin had applied to the Registrar of Births, Deaths, and Marriages to have his sex legally changed. Additionally, for the trial, Kevin spoke to several psychologists to affirm that he identified as male. In court, the Judge heard from a total of four doctors and thirty nine other witnesses (twenty three of which were family or friends of Kevin, and sixteen of which were his colleagues). These witnesses spoke to the fact that Kevin was perceived as male in all aspects of his life. The case ultimately came down to the interpretation of the word "Man" in terms of marriage. Chisholm J had to decide whether to stand behind the finding of Corbett v Corbett, or whether to accept that the modern interpretation of the word man includes transsexual and transgender individuals.

== Holding ==
Chisholm J had to make his ruling based not only on Kevin's identity, but on the meaning of the statute and the past ruling of Corbett v Corbett. In this trial, the Attorney General based most of his argument on the ruling of Corbett. As such, the judge had to examine it to decide if the ruling was applicable to this case. Ultimately he decided to overrule Corbett, coming to the decision that marriage is not purely sexual, and that the ability to bear children isn't required. He also ruled that the ruling of Corbett ignored the psychological and social impact of gender. Ultimately, he found that Corbett was not applicable to Re Kevin. The last component of Chisholm J's decision was the constitution, which he decided was up to modern interpretation. Since the common definition of "Man" in Australia in 2001 included a post-operation transsexual man, then it followed that the constitution must include that in terms of marriage. For these reasons, it was ruled that Kevin's marriage was valid as he was male at the time of the marriage.

== Social implications ==
There were broader social implications of this case than just the ruling for Kevin and Jennifer. One key point of contention in the trial was the use of the term Transsexual. The judge felt the term to be dehumanizing, and he felt that since Kevin had always identified as male, that the term was not quite accurate. However, this case took place before the popularization of the word transgender, and as such the judge used transsexual but acknowledged the issues of the word in the official trial documents. Another issue was the trial as a whole. This was a landmark case. Australia had never seen a decision that affirmed the rights of transsexual and transgender people to marry as the sex/gender they identify as. In fact, most places world-wide had not seen a decision that did that. This trial marked a victory for equal rights. This case has since been referenced in many cases worldwide, helping to allow transsexual and transgender people to marry as their preferred sex/gender.

== See also ==
- Transgender rights in Australia
- List of transgender-related topics
- Legal status of transgender people
