= Zoe Belle Gender Collective =

Australian organization

Zoe Belle Gender Collective, formerly known as the Zoe Belle Gender Centre, is a Melbourne, Victoria-based organization that is concerned with the health and well-being of transgender and other gender diverse people. Among its activities, the organization has been campaigning for the establishment of a community centre. Zoe Belle Gender Collective was founded in 2007 and is named after the late transgender activist Zoe Belle.

== History ==
Since the 1980s, local transgender organizations, such as the group Seahorse Victoria, have sought to establish a state-funded community centre for Victoria's transgender population. Zoe Belle Gender Collective is the most recent attempt to establish such a centre.

The organization emerged following a forum on transgender healthcare at Camp Betty, a festival of radical sex and politics that was held 7–11 June 2007 in Melbourne. The forum began with the "premise that we need better healthcare for trans people, more community involvement in healthcare provision from transpeople rather than doctors and 'experts', and that this healthcare should be publicly funded."

Following the forum, a group of activists from the local SGD community began a campaign to establish a 'gender centre' for Victoria. Among the group was Zoe Belle, an activist in LGBT rights, women's rights, and other causes. On 15 January 2008, Zoe Belle took her own life. In tribute to Zoe Belle, the group of activists became known as the Zoe Belle Gender Centre Working Group and they named the emerging organization Zoe Belle Gender Centre.

On 25 August 2015 the Zoe Belle Gender Centre changing their name to the Zoe Belle Gender Collective.

== Mission ==
The organization's mission statement is: "To support and improve the health and wellbeing of people of all genders. We view health holistically to assist, inform, enliven and advocate for our communities."

== Primary activities ==
=== Campaign to establish a 'gender centre' for Victoria ===
In the lead-up to the 2010 Victorian State Election, Zoe Belle Gender Collective intensified its lobbying efforts for the establishment of a state-funded gender centre for Victoria. In a 24 October 2010 media release, the organization criticised the Brumby Government's GLBTI-related election promises as "(forgetting) the 'T' and 'I'". It called upon the Labor Government to work with Zoe Belle Gender Collective to establish a state-funded, community-driven gender centre. During this period, Zoe Belle Gender Collective received public letters of support from the Victorian Greens party and the Australian Sex Party. On 24 November, the Victorian Labor Party issued its own letter of support for Zoe Belle Gender Collective, written by then-Deputy Premier and Attorney-General Rob Hulls. On 27 November, the centre-right Liberal/National Coalition opposition, which had not expressed any support for the organization, won government.

=== Suicide prevention of young transgender and gender diverse people ===
In December 2011, Zoe Belle Gender Collective was one of seven recipients of a $4 million package from the Baillieu Government to address suicide and self-harm among LGBTI young people. Receiving non-recurrent funding of $146,000 over four years, Zoe Belle Gender Collective became what is believed to be the first Victorian transgender organization to receive government funding.

=== Virtual gender centre ===
In August 2010, the organization launched a 'virtual gender centre'. Based at Zoe Belle Gender Collective's official website, the virtual gender centre provides resources for those who are interested in the health and well-being of SGD people.

=== Events ===
The organization runs community events such as workshops and social gatherings.

== See also ==
- Transgender rights in Australia
- LGBT rights in Australia
