= Rebekah Robertson =

Australian actress, author and activist (born 1967)

Rebekah Robertson OAM
- Born: 4 July 1967 (age 59); Surrey, England
- Education: University of Tasmania; John Bolton Theatre School
- Occupations: Actress; author
- Years active: 1988–present
- Spouse: Greg Stone (m. 1999; sep. 2013)
- Children: Georgie Stone
- Website: transcend.org.au

Rebekah Sarah Robertson OAM (born 4 July 1967 in Surrey, England) is an Australian actress, author and activist who has appeared on television and on stage. In 2012, Robertson founded the first parent led peer support group and information hub for transgender kids and their families in Australia, Transcend. She now advocates for transgender kids and has won numerous awards for her work.

== Early life ==
Robertson was born in Surrey, England, but grew up in Hobart, Tasmania with her four sisters.

== Career ==
=== Acting ===
Rebekah Robertson began her career with an appearance in the television show, Problem Creek as Min, in 1988. Robertson began appearing in multiple Zootango Theatre Company shows, including Alice in Wonderland as the Queen of Hearts, As You Like It as Phoebe, The Comedy of Errors as Adrianna and A Midsummer Night's Dream as Hermia, amongst others. In 1995, Robertson played Greer in the play Wilful Blue at the Victorian Arts Centre. In 1992, she appeared in theatre shows such as The Legend of the Muse and Jeffrey Bernard is Unwell. Robertson also appeared on television shows Fridge Door and Elvis Was Greek in 1994 and 1995 respectively.

After a move to Melbourne in 1995, Robertson began performing in MTC shows, such as Lady Windermere's Fan and Private Lives. She also made an appearance in the show Queen Kat. In 2003, Robertson was nominated for a Green Room Award for her performance in Humble Boy. She continued appearing in MTC productions, like Boy Gets Girl as Madeleine Beck, All My Sons as Sue Bayliss, Cat on a Hot Tin Roof as Mae and August: Osage County as Ivy Weston. She won a Green Room Award for her performance in August: Osage County in the Best Supporting Actress category. Rebekah Robertson also made guest appearances in multiple television shows throughout the 2000s, including Neighbours, The Librarians, City Homicide, Tangle and Conspiracy 365.

=== Activism ===
In 2012, Robertson founded the first parent led peer support group and information hub for transgender kids and their families in Australia, Transcend. In 2014, she appeared on Four Corners in disguise (due to a legal requirement) with her daughter, Georgie (also in disguise), talking about their experiences in court and changing the law. From then on, Robertson and Stone have appeared on The Project to talk about the importance of the Safe Schools Coalition and Australian Story, telling their story. Robertson continues to advocate for transgender children and their families. In February 2016, Robertson travelled to Canberra to meet with politicians, urging them to change the law surrounding the requirement that transgender kids should have to go to court to access cross-sex hormones. Robertson was nominated for Straight Ally of the Year at the GLOBE Community Awards in 2016, but lost to Matt Finnis from St Kilda Football Club.

On 3 September 2019, Penguin published her first book, About a Girl.

== Personal life ==
"Because of the stress, anxiety and the time limit of puberty and court together... transgender people and their families are pushed to the limit,"

— Robertson on the court process

Robertson married Greg Stone in 1999. They live in Victoria and have two children, Georgie and Harry Stone. In 2013 they separated and at some point divorced.

Robertson had to apply to the Family Court of Australia so to help her daughter access puberty blockers, a process she described as being "extremely stressful and a very pathologising experience." She was able to find a group lawyers that agreed to do the process. After appealing to the Family Court, the law requiring that transgender children and their families should apply to the Family Court for stage 1 to access puberty blockers treatment was eradicated in 2013. Robertson had to apply to the Family Court of Australia again in 2015 to help her daughter access cross sex hormones. They also appealed to the Family Court, the law stage 2 requiring that transgender children and their families should apply to the Family Court to access cross-sex hormone therapy was removed on 30 November 2017.

== Acting credits ==
=== Film ===
Year	Title	Role	Notes	Ref
2002	Children in Focus	Karina	La Trobe University Short Film	
2022	The Dreamlife of Georgie Stone	Herself	Documentary short	

=== Television ===
Year	Title	Role	Notes	Ref
1988	Problem Creek	Min		
1994	Fridge Door	Presenter		
1995	Elvis Was Greek	Rock-a-billy Girl		
1998	Queen Kat	Lecturer		
2004, 2021–2024	Neighbours	Rhonda del Rubio	Guest role	
2009	The Librarians	Lauren	Season 2, episode 1: "Just Returned"	
2009	City Homicide	Sharnie Pullman	Season 4, episode 2: "Good Cop, Bad Cop"	
2010	Tangle	Therapist's Receptionist	Season 2, episode 5	
2011	Conspiracy 365	Janet Spencer	Season 1, episodes 9 & 11: "September" & "November"	
2014	Four Corners	Herself (with prosthetics)	Documentary, episode: "Being Me"	
2016	Australian Story	Herself	Documentary, episode: "About a Girl"	

=== Theatre ===
Year	Title	Role	Notes
1988	Blithe Spirit		Zootango Theatre Company
1988	Soft Targets		Zootango Theatre Company
1988	Les Liaisons Dangereuses		Zootango Theatre Company
1988	Hallelujah Lady Jane		Zootango Theatre Company
1988	Agnes of God		Zootango Theatre Company
1992	And Then It Starts To Happen	Puppeteer	Terrapin Puppet Theatre
1992	The Legend of the Muse	Performer	Melbourne Fringe Festival
1992	Jeffrey Bernard is Unwell	All Female Roles	Ned Sherrin National Tour
1993	Alice in Wonderland	Queen of Hearts	Zootango Theatre Company
1993	As You Like It	Phoebe	Zootango Theatre Company
1993	Quartet	Merteuil	Zootango Theatre Company
1994	Alice in Wonderland	Queen of Hearts	Zootango Theatre Company
1994	The Comedy of Errors	Adrianna	Zootango Theatre Company
1994	Così	Ruth	Zootango Theatre Company
1995	A Midsummer Night's Dream	Hermia	Zootango Theatre Company
1995	Wilful Blue	Greer	Victorian Arts Centre
1995	Lady Carlisle	Melbourne Theatre Company	
1997	Private Lives	Melbourne Theatre Company	Sibyl
2003	Humble Boy	Melbourne Theatre Company	Rosie Pye
2005	Boy Gets Girl	Melbourne Theatre Company	Madeleine Beck
2007	All My Sons	Melbourne Theatre Company	Sue Bayliss
2008	Cat on a Hot Tin Roof	Melbourne Theatre Company	Mae
2009	August: Osage County	Melbourne Theatre Company	Ivy Weston

== Awards and achievements ==
Year	Organisation	Award	Work	Result	Ref
1993	Variety Club Award	Best Professional Actor	Quartet	Won	
2003	Green Room Awards	Best Female Supporting Performer	Humble Boy	Nominated	
2009	Green Room Awards	Best Female Supporting Performer	August: Osage County	Won	
2016	GLOBE Community Awards	Straight Ally of the Year	Herself	Nominated	
2018	GLOBE Community Awards	Straight Ally of the Year	Herself	Nominated	
2019	Australian LGBTI Awards	Ally of the Year	Herself	Nominated	
2019	GLOBE Community Awards	Straight Ally of the Year	Herself	Won	
