= Edward De Lacy Evans =

Irish-born Australian trans man (c. 1830–1901)

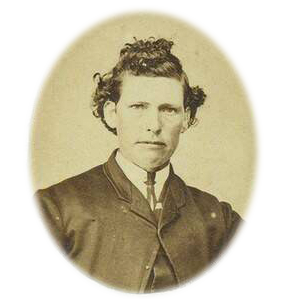
- Born: c. 1830; County Kilkenny, Ireland
- Died: 25 August 1901 (aged 70-71); Melbourne, Victoria, Australia
- Other names: Ellen Tremayne, Ellen Tremaye
- Spouses: Mary Delahunty (m. 1856; sep. 1862) Sarah Moore (m. 1862; d. 1867) Julia Marquand (m. 1868)
- Children: Julia Mary

Edward De Lacy Evans (c. 1830 – 25 August 1901) was a servant, blacksmith, and gold miner who immigrated from Ireland to Australia in 1856.

Evans gained international attention in 1879 when it was revealed that he was assigned female at birth.

Throughout his life, Evans was admitted to several insane asylums, where doctors attempted to "cure" him of his male identity. Despite these attempts, he lived as a man for at least 22 years. Evans is registered as the father of his child. Around 1880, he publicly acknowledged his identity, including performing at the Melbourne Waxworks under the tagline "The Wonderful Male Impersonator", and in Sydney as "The Man-Woman Mystery".

== Early life and name ==
Edward De Lacy Evans was born circa 1830 as Ellen Tremayne or Tremaye. Details of Evans' early life and his choice of name remain shrouded in mystery.

Evans told miners he worked with in Australia that he was born in France, had stolen £500 as a boy, and fled to County Waterford, where he acquired his Irish accent. However, a woman living near Corop, who claimed to be a former neighbor from County Kilkenny, identified Evans as the well-born "Ellen Lacy". She alleged that Evans had an illegitimate child, fled to America, and returned to Ireland in the early 1850s as "Mrs. De Lacy Evans". According to her, Evans dramatically rode a horse through a gathering called by John Ponsonby, 5th Earl of Bessborough, only to be "dragged off her pony" and forced to "clear out."

Evans' third wife, Julia Marquand, claimed the name "De Lacy Evans" was a family name and that his uncle was the British General George de Lacy Evans.

After his hospitalization, Evans spoke little about his past and was described as "not disposed to be communicative" and someone who "observes unusual taciturnity." In 1879, when asked why he had "impersonated a man," Evans replied, "Oh, it doesn't matter, and the sooner they put me out of the way and get done with me the better."

== Immigration to Victoria ==
In 1856, Edward De Lacy Evans arrived in Victoria, Australia, during the gold rush boom period, aboard the Ocean Monarch as part of the 'assisted immigration scheme.' This scheme aimed to provide workers and residents needed in the growing colony. Evans traveled under the name Ellen Tremayne and, in the information provided, stated that he was 26 years old, born in County Kilkenny, a Roman Catholic, a housemaid, and literate.

For most of the voyage to Australia, Evans wore a distinctive outfit: 'a green merino dress and sealskin coat reaching almost to her ankles' paired with a men's shirt and trousers. Evans also carried a trunk full of male attire, stamped with the name 'Edward De Lacy Evans.' This, coupled with apparent 'sexual attachments' formed with some female cabinmates, led to speculation among passengers that Evans was a man impersonating a woman.

One such companion, identified as Rose Kelly, reportedly fell ill and disembarked at Rio de Janeiro en route. Another, Mary Montague, was also noted. Fellow passengers speculated that the 'real' Edward De Lacy Evans had enticed 'Ellen Tremayne' to take passage with him by sending his trunk ahead, only to abandon her later. Alternatively, a later theory suggested the clothes were Evans' own and that he had chosen to travel in female guise either out of fear of disclosure among men or a preference for the company of women.

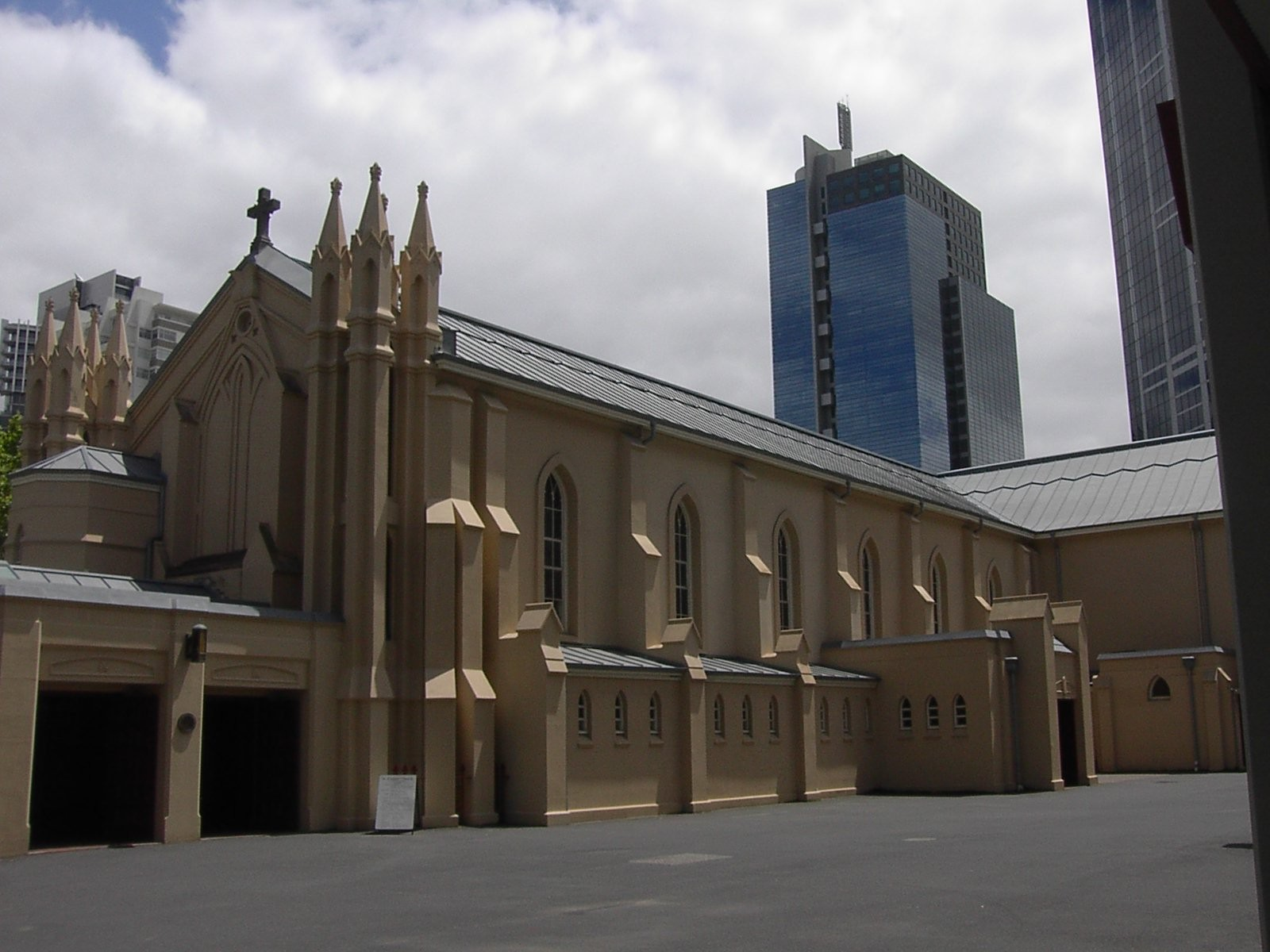
St Francis' Church in Melbourne, where Edward De Lacy Evans married Mary Delahunty in 1856.

As a condition of his assisted passage, Evans (under the name Ellen Tremayne) was indentured as a maidservant to McKeddie, a Melton hotelkeeper, earning 25 shillings per week. However, he soon left the position and reunited with Mary Delahunty, a fellow Ocean Monarch passenger. Delahunty, a 34-year-old governess from Harristown, County Waterford, had also formed a close attachment with Evans during the voyage. Mrs. Thompson, another passenger, later claimed that Evans and Delahunty were from the same village in County Kilkenny and that Delahunty possessed £900. Delahunty reportedly declared she would marry Evans 'as soon as the ship reached Melbourne.'

Wearing male clothes and calling himself 'Edmund De Lacy,' Evans married Delahunty in a Roman Catholic ceremony at St Francis' Church.

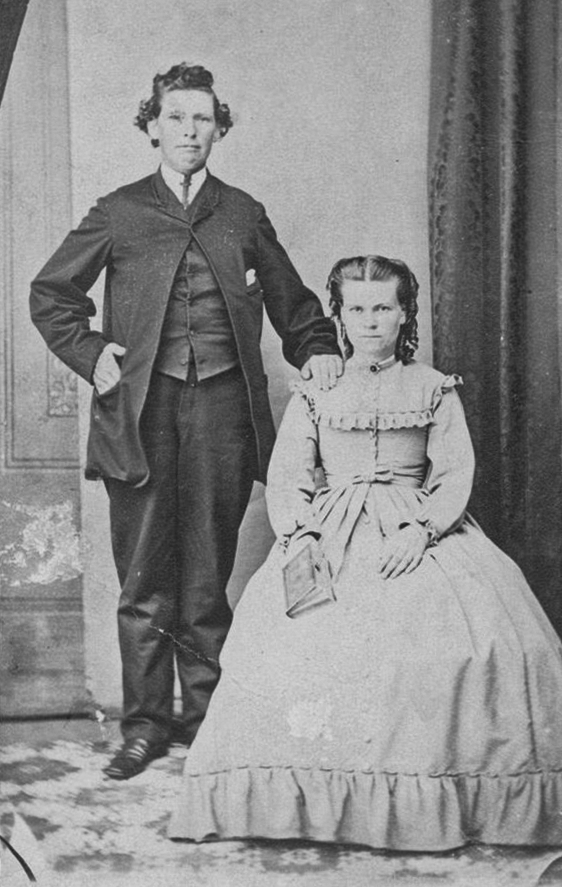
Evans (left) pictured with his third wife, Julia Marquand (right).

Little is known about Evans and Delahunty's married life in the years following their union, though reports suggest they 'did not live comfortably together.' Evans moved north to work as a miner at Blackwood, near Melton, where he had been employed as Ellen Tremayne. Delahunty followed him in 1858. In Blackwood, Delahunty established a school but left in 1862 to marry Lyman Oatman Hart, an American mining surveyor.

Delahunty justified her actions, dismissing objections to her apparent act of bigamy by asserting that her first marriage was not valid because Evans was a woman. She and Hart relocated to Daylesford, where they lived through the 1860s and 1870s.

== Sandhurst ==
In 1862, Evans left Blackwood, Victoria, and moved to the central Victorian city of Sandhurst (now known as Bendigo). Describing himself as a widower, he married 23-year-old Irishwoman Sarah Moore. Over the next five years, Evans held various occupations, including carter, miner, blacksmith, and ploughman. He lived with Moore in several nearby towns and owned shares in several gold mines, paying property rates in Sandhurst and the neighboring district of Eaglehawk. At one point, he was jailed for seven days for trespass after being found in a servant's bedroom at a local hotel.

In 1867, Moore died of pulmonary tuberculosis. The following year, Evans met and married Julia Marquand, a 25-year-old friend of his late wife's sister. Marquand was a French dressmaker's assistant who lived with her sister and brother-in-law, Jean Baptiste Loridan, a prominent Sandhurst businessman and owner of the City Family Hotel.

In the early years of their marriage, Evans and Marquand often lived apart, but they reconciled by 1872. Evans advanced in his mining career, and their home in Sandhurst was a cottage he built himself. A formal studio portrait taken around this time is notable for its depiction of the couple's sense of stability and traditional family life.

In 1877, Marquand gave birth to a daughter, whom they named Julia Mary. Evans supported Marquand when she brought a child maintenance suit against her brother-in-law Jean Baptiste Loridan for the child. However, Evans was listed as the father on the child's birth certificate. Around this time, Evans sustained a work injury, and although he "welcomed the child as his own," he was reportedly "deeply disturbed by the circumstances in which his wife became pregnant."

On July 21, 1879, Jean Baptiste Loridan took Evans to Bendigo Hospital, claiming Evans had become "dangerous to others." Evans escaped after refusing to bathe but was arrested at his home the next day. He was brought before the Police Court, where magistrates agreed with the medical assessment that he was suffering from "softening of the brain." Evans was subsequently involuntarily committed to the "lunatic wards" of Bendigo Hospital.

== Kew Asylum and press attention ==
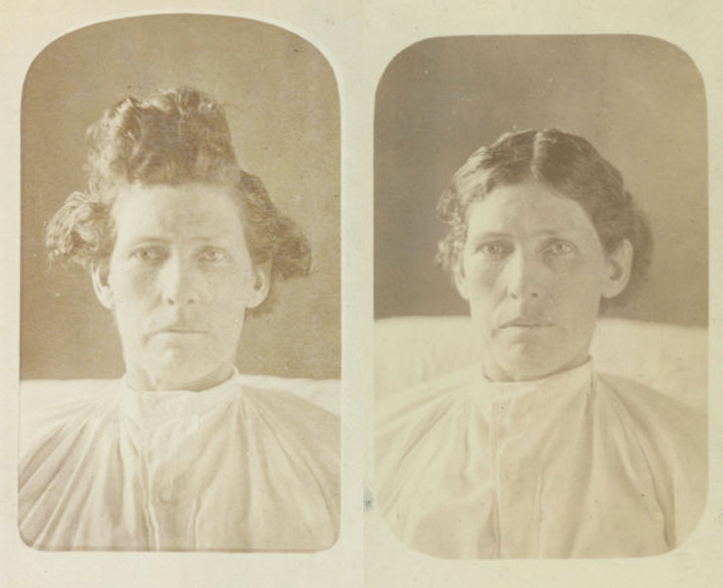
1879 photographs of Evans at Kew Lunatic Asylum.

For six weeks at the Bendigo Hospital, Evans refused to take a bath. He shared a room with a warder named Gundry, to whom he stated that his parents were Irish, but that he had come from France at about seven or eight years of age. However, when Gundry used some French phrases, Evans claimed he had "forgotten the language." During this time, Evans received regular visits from his wife, daughter, and other relatives. One relative referred to Evans as "Uncle", while Julia Mary called him "Dadds".

On 30 August 1879, the hospital decided to send Evans and another patient to the Kew Asylum near Melbourne, accompanied by a police constable. Marquand was at the station when they departed. Evans told her to take care of Julia Mary, and both Evans and his wife were reportedly weeping as they parted.

The events at the Kew Asylum were described in The Argus on 3 September 1879:

"A curious incident has occurred at Kew Lunatic Asylum. A lunatic was brought from Sandhurst by the police, and was admitted into one of the male wards. The patient was tolerably quiet until preparations were made for giving 'him' the usual bath. On the attendants attempting to carry out the programme, violent resistance was made, the reason for which proved to be that the supposed man was in reality a woman. The most singular part of the affair is that the woman had been received into Sandhurst Hospital as a male patient and sent thence to the asylum under the name of Evans. She states that she has lived at Sandhurst for many years dressed in male attire. Her age is about 35."

On 4 September 1879, the Bendigo Advertiser ran the headline "Extraordinary Case of Concealment of Sex" and reported:

"One of the most unparalleled impostures has been brought to light during the past few days, which it has ever been the province of the press of these colonies to chronicle, and we might even add is unprecedented in the annals of the whole world. A woman, under the name of Edward De Lacy Evans, has for 20 years passed for a man in various parts of the colony of Victoria... As it is almost impossible to give an account of the case without making use of the masculine pronoun when referring to Evans, we propose to use that appellation."

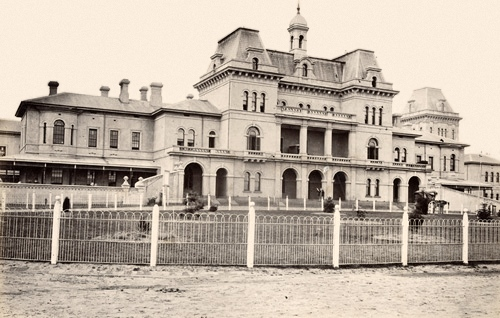
Kew Asylum in the 19th century, where Edward De Lacy Evans was sent

The incident was soon widely reported, both locally and internationally. The Kew Asylum determined that Evans was a woman, whereupon he was "promptly handed over to female nurses" and sent back to Bendigo. Evans later recalled:

"The fellers there took hold o' me to give me a bath, an' they stripped me to put me in the water, an' then they saw the mistake. One feller ran off as if he was frightened; the others looked thunderstruck an' couldn't speak. I was handed over to the women, and they dressed me up in frocks and petticoats."

While still at Bendigo Hospital, Evans disclosed knowledge of the father of his child, voiced concerns about his wife's infidelity, and expressed worries about financial troubles and potentially losing his house. He remarked, "Everything coming together was enough to drive a man mad."

Marquand insisted to the press that she had never known Evans was not a man. Meanwhile, photographers capitalized on the publicity. Stawell photographer Aaron Flegeltaub sold copies of an earlier formal portrait of Evans and Marquand. Sandhurst photographer N. White gained access to the hospital to capture images of Evans in a "white hospital nightshirt (or straight-jacket)," which were later sold as curiosities.

Evans was subjected to a gynecological examination by Dr Penfold, which caused him significant distress. The examination confirmed that Evans was "physiologically female" and had borne a child. Evans later stated that the examination had caused him harm.

On 10 October 1879, the Bendigo Hospital refused a request from Kew Asylum to return Evans, citing his improvement. By December, Evans was declared "cured" and released. However, dressed in female attire, he appeared "still mentally distressed" when testifying in support of Marquand's unsuccessful lawsuit against Loridan.

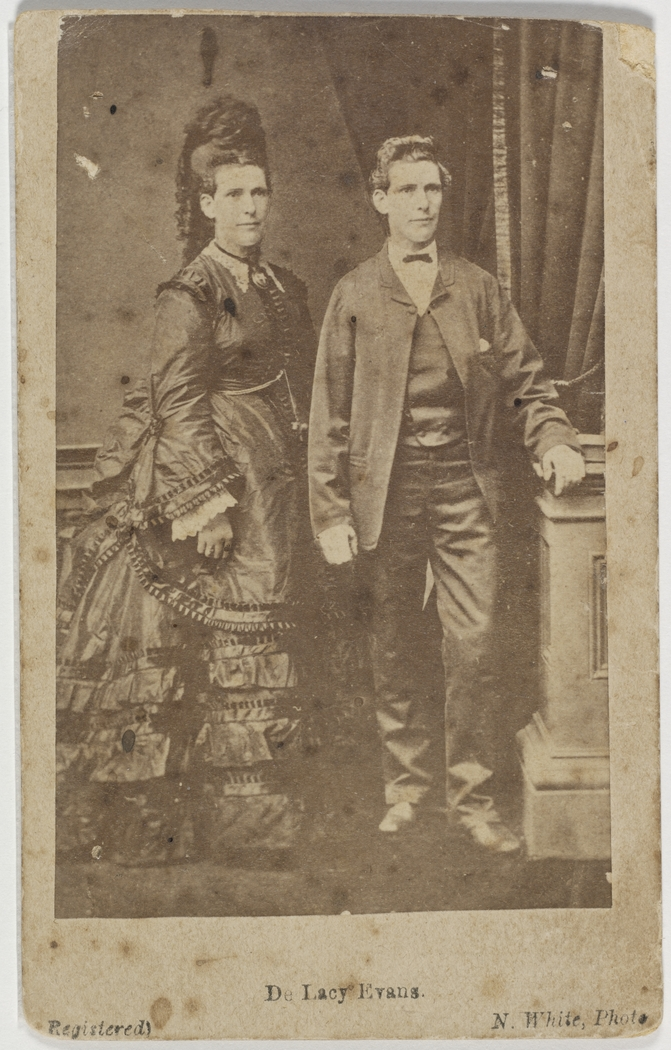
A doctored carte de visite of Evans, likely created as a "cut & paste" by Bendigo photographer N. White after September 1879, sold as a curiosity.

== Later life and legacy ==
In late December 1879, Evans participated in events organized by panorama showmen Augustus Baker Pierce and William Bignell in Geelong and Stawell. Newspapers noted that "neither mind nor body possesses the vigour once so noticeable." This was followed in 1880 by appearances in Melbourne, where Evans was billed as "The Wonderful Male Impersonator" as part of the 'living wonders' exhibit at the Waxworks. In Sydney, Evans' shows were accompanied by pamphlets promoting "The Man-Woman Mystery".

By February 1881, Evans applied for admission to a Benevolent Asylum and was sent to the Melbourne Immigrants' Home on St Kilda Road. Evans resided there until his death 20 years later, on 25 August 1901.

In 1897, Joseph Furphy, who had lived near Bendigo since the late 1860s, published his first novel, Such Is Life, which included a passing reference to Evans: "one of those De Lacy Evanses we often read of in novels".

In 2006, sites associated with Evans were included in the Australian Queer Archives' queer history walk during Melbourne's Midsumma Festival.
