= Augustus Baker Peirce =

Augustus Baker Peirce also known as Gus Pierce (7 October 1840 – 1919), was an American sailor, actor, raconteur and artist in several mediums, who spent some 10 years in Australia. His autobiography Knocking About was accepted by some critics as a largely true, if flawed, account of his travels and experiences.

Although he generally used the spelling "Pierce" in Australia, his birth name "Peirce" has been used here, except in relation to his wife and sons, who took the name "Pierce".

== History ==
Gus Peirce was born in West Medford, Massachusetts the son either of merchant George A. Peirce, and Jane Peirce, née Nye or Major Moses Peirce and Mehitable [sic] Peirce, née Nye. He may have had an early career with the US Navy and was a sailor on the Oriental (Capt. Osgood) which left New York Harbor on 27 September 1859 and arrived at Port Phillip on 12 January 1860, when he deserted ship by swimming ashore. He embarked on various occupations: selling meat pies for George Millbank at New Inglewood; selling Frank Weston's "Wizard Oil" in Dunolly; landscape painting in Melbourne; working as photographer's assistant for Batchelder and O'Neill of Salem, Massachusetts and scenery painting for the Lyceum Theatre. He went snake hunting with Joseph Shires (ca.1822 – 16 March 1892), the famous inventor of a snake-bite cure. He travelled by Murray steamboat to Wentworth, where he acted as bum bailiff for "the White Chinaman" John Egge against a family of acrobats.

== Steamboats ==
He was introduced to life on the Murray by fellow-Americans Alexander Sinclair Murray and Peleg Whitford Jackson, for whom he compiled a strip-map of the river from Albury to Goolwa around 1863. He acted as pilot for their Lady Daly but had an argument with James Mace, her skipper 1864–65, and was left on the Blanchetown wharf. (He then joined a ship transporting horses to Madras, though it could not have been the Europa as stated in his autobiography). He skippered Murray River paddle-steamers Corowa 1868,1869, Jane Eliza 1871, Victoria (which he may have owned) 1873–1875. and Riverina 1876.

== Painting ==
In 1869 in Echuca, while a riverboat captain, and in a period when low river heights forced Jane Eliza to be laid up, Peirce commenced the first of his panoramas, His series of scenes, representing a sea voyage around the world, painted in distemper on canvas, were well received. The first, a faithful copy of Frith's depiction of Paddington Railway Station, was particularly admired, as were pictures of Mount Cook and Wanganui in New Zealand. The panorama was exhibited in Echuca's Town Hall from October 1869, with musical accompanied by local musicians and singers, including Peirce himself. He took the show to nearby towns then in April 1870 to Wagga Wagga, with Peirce giving a humorous commentary. Around this time he painted a series of murals for Echuca's Steampacket Hotel,(Mudie, op. cit p. 172) a regular haunt of riverboat people. In mid-1872 he was showing his panorama at the Hill End, New South Wales gold diggings. The panorama, and additional pictures of the diggings, were shown at Wagga Wagga as part of a complimentary benefit for Peirce. Around 1876 Peirce moved to Geelong, and there began his second panorama, "Mirror of Australia", which was unveiled in November 1879, in conjunction with William Bignell. The following month they showed in Castlemaine, with the male impersonator Ellen Tremaye ("De Lacy Evans") as a sensational added attraction. By 1881 this panorama was being shown in England. In the 1880s, still living in Geelong, and running a "cigar divan", he was making portraits in oils, especially of horses and sportsmen One which survives is of the Melbourne Hunt Club. He also painted stage scenery, which was well received. By 1883 he was proprietor of the Black Bull Hotel. Peirce left Geelong in 1892. His farewell benefit was a disaster – he had prepared some lithographed handbills advertising the event, which featured caricatures of leading Geelong citizens which were not well received, and several artists who had promised to perform withdrew their support, and the local MP, John Rout Hopkins, took umbrage and set the law onto the printers. To cap it off, the night was wet and stormy and though many tickets had been sold, few turned up. In 1894 he was living in Peel Street, North Melbourne, still making a living as an artist.

== Performer ==
Peirce was a versatile and prolific performer on stage: he appeared with various troupes as a ventriloquist and comic singer (though his choice of songs did not please one reviewer of a variety show at Melbourne's Theatre Royal). He played at Hill End in 1872 with W. B. Gill.

== Autobiography ==
Knocking About: Being some adventures of Augustus Baker Peirce in Australia, his autobiography, edited by Mrs. Albert T. Leadbeater was published posthumously by Yale University Press in 1924, the third in a series funded by a foundation established in memory of Ensign Curtis Seaman Read (1895–1918), USNRF. It has been republished by Literary Licensing LLC in 2013 ISBN 9781258883393

== Family ==
He married Agnes Carney at Moama and had two sons, Augustus Baker Pierce (1869 – 1 May 1921) who lived in Geelong and died in Melbourne, and Herbert, who also remained in Geelong after the departure of their father.
