= Re Alex =

Judgement of the Family Court of Australia

- Court: Family Court of Australia
- Full case name: Re Alex: Hormonal Treatment for Gender Identity Dysphoria
- Decided: 13 April 2004
- Citations: [2004] FamCA 297 (2004) 180 FLR 89; (2004) 31 Fam LR 503

Court membership
- Judge sitting: Nicholson CJ

Re Alex was a legal case decided in the Family Court of Australia on 13 April 2004. It examined the rights of a thirteen-year-old adolescent affirming his maleness and seeking hormonal medical treatment "Sex Affirmation Treatment."

== Case ==
An application was made concerning a thirteen-year-old referred to as "Alex". Alex was a ward of the State of Victoria. Alex was diagnosed as experiencing the condition called "gender identity disorder" (often experienced by transgender people) controversially contained in the Diagnostic and Statistical Manual of Mental Disorders ("DSM IV") maintained by the American Psychiatrists Association.

The key issue was whether the Victorian State Government Department having the responsibility for Alex's care and welfare or the Family Court of Australia should have responsibility for the authorisation of medical treatment involving the administration of hormonal therapies to assist Alex to have a body with secondary sexual characteristics most appropriate to his innate affirmed maleness and, in so doing, relieve him of the extreme suffering he was experiencing as a result of female pubertal development.

At birth and, at the time of the case, Alex was, in the eyes of the law, a female.

== Judgment ==
Chief Justice Nicholson ruled as follows:

- That the hormonal medical treatment sought by Alex was "Special Medical Treatment" as per the High Court of Australia's decision in Marion's Case and that therefore only the Family Court of Australia, and not parents or legal guardians, has the legal authority to authorise such treatment.
- Neither Alex nor any adolescent who is transgender was capable of "Gillick competence" to authorise such medical treatment on their own behalf.
- Alex's treating doctors were ultimately authorised by the court to commence a form of hormonal treatment - that did not constitute the full Phase 1 and Phase 2 programme of hormonal treatment (referred to as the "Dutch Protocol") that is administered today if the young person presents for and gains court authorisation for treatment by Tanner Stage 2 of Pubertal development.
- Alex was permitted to be enrolled in school under a male name (although this was not strictly necessary and not the role of the court even on this judgement).

== Subsequent case ==
In 2004, it was not contemplated that Alex would undergo any surgical intervention while he was under the age of at least 18 years. In 2007 when Alex was 16 years old, the State guardian made a further application to the Family Court of Australia to obtain the court's authorisation for a double mastectomy. Chief Justice Bryant authorised the procedure in October 2007 however her reasons for judgment were not published until 2009.
