= Noelena Tame =

Australian transgender activist

- Citizenship: Australia
- Occupations: Human rights activist Bowls player
- Years active: 1970s–1980s
- Organization: Australian Transsexuals Association
- Known for: Campaigning for transgender rights in Australia

Noelena Tame was an Australian human rights activist and bowls player. In 1978, she founded the Australian Transsexuals Association, a support group for trans women which by 1982 was actively campaigning for legal rights for transgender people.

== Biography ==
Little is known about Tame's life; at the point she began her activism in the late 1970s, she had undergone gender-affirming surgery and was a retiree living in Coogee in the Eastern Suburbs of Sydney, Australia, where she was an active member of the Moore Park Women's Lawn Bowls Club.

During the late 1970s or early 1980s, Tame founded the Australian Transsexuals Association, a transgender support group based in Sydney. The history of the ATA's early days, including its exact founding date and membership, remains largely unknown; described as "informal and discrete", much of the group's early activism consisted of communication and support between members being offered through mail correspondence. It is known that the ATA's initial focus was supporting trans women who intended to undergo gender-affirming surgery, as Tame had, and was not known for its campaigning and public activism until later in its history.

By 1981, Tame was running weekly ATA meetings at the Wayside Chapel in Kings Cross, where she likely first met transgender activist Roberta Perkins. In June 1981, Tame and Perkins decided to focus on activism, specifically calling for trans women who had undergone gender-affirming surgery to be legally recognised as women, and for Australian authorities to provide assistance for people to access gender-affirming care. Tame and Perkins began lobbying Frank Walker, a member of the Parliament of New South Wales and the Attorney General of New South Wales, to introduce legislation to the New South Wales government that would promote and legalise transgender rights. By 1982, the ATA's scope had expanded to include public activism for transgender rights, in addition to the peer support for trans woman as originally envisioned by Tame; that year, it organised Australia's first transgender rights rally in Manly.

In 1982, the Sydney Morning Herald published an article on Tame and Perkins' activism; in it, it described Tame as an "avid lawn bowls player". When news of Tame being a trans woman reached Moore Park Women's Lawn Bowls Club, an internal investigation was run by the club's governing body, New South Wales Bowling; the investigation concluded that Tame was a man, and that her membership at the women's bowls club should be revoked and that she should be banned from entering state women's bowls competitions.

Tame subsequently left the leadership of the ATA in order to prepare a legal case against New South Wales Bowling; she was replaced as leader by Perkins. Tame's legal case, which she took to state and federal anti-discrimination boards, was reported on sympathetically in the women's magazine Woman's Day, who described Tame as a "respectable grandmother who simply wanted to play lawn bowls". Tame's case was ultimately dismissed, which was attributed to the lack of provision for transgender people in Australia's anti-discrimination legislation in 1982.

After the dismissal of the case, Tame did not return to the ATA's leadership, though continued to campaign for transgender rights.

== Recognition ==
Tame featured in the 1983 documentary film Man into Woman: The Transsexual Experience, directed by John Ruane, which received a limited release in Australia. Tame appeared in the film alongside Perkins, Carmen Rupe and Chanelle St Laurent.

In 2023, ACON, a New South Wales-based HIV organisation, paid tribute to Perkins as a "trans trailblazer and leader" to commemorate International Women's Day.
