= Georgie Stone =

Australian actress and transgender rights activist

Georgie Stone OAM
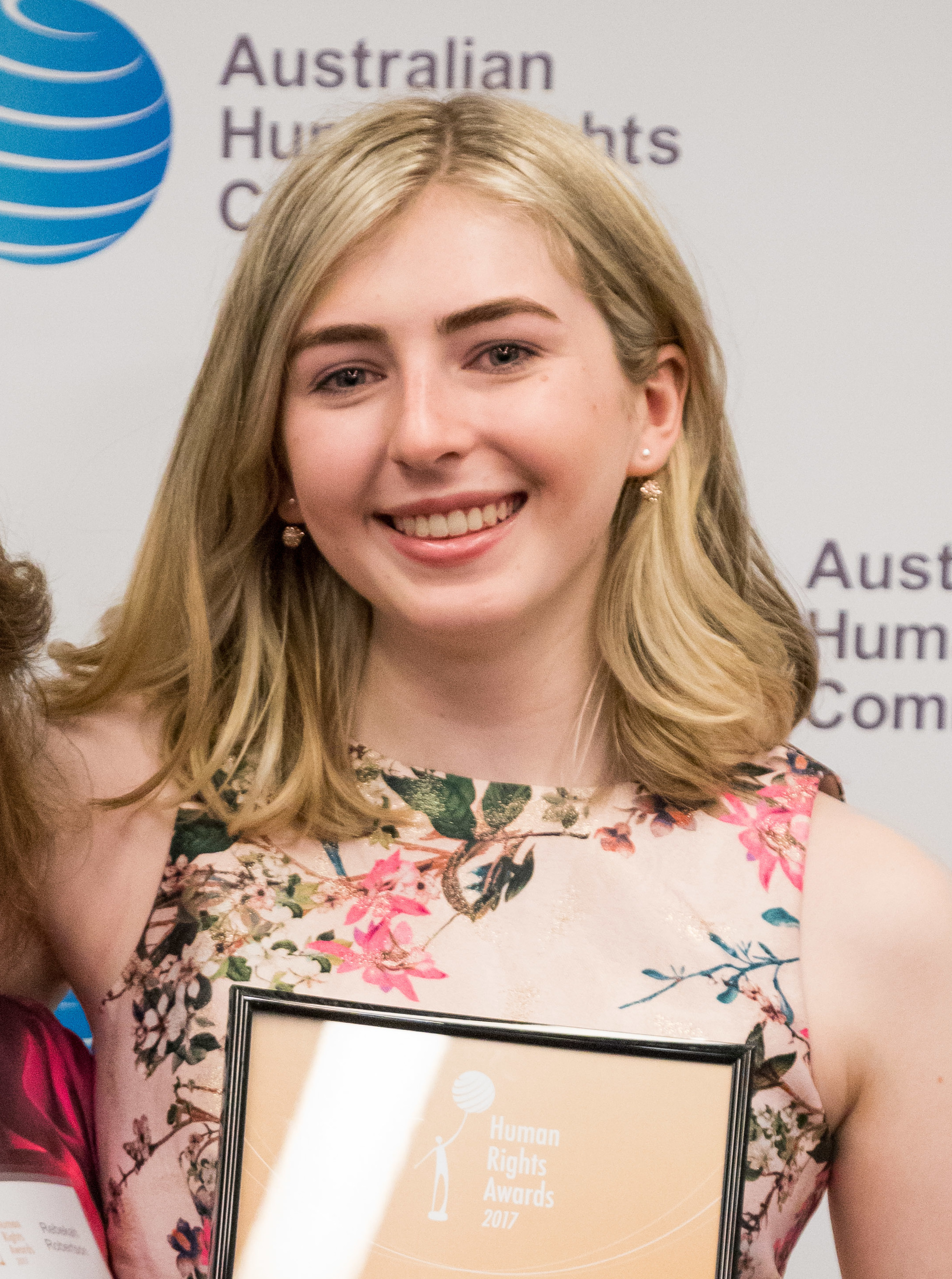
- Stone in December 2017
- Other name: Georgie Sarah Jean Robertson Stone
- Occupations: Actress; writer; advocate
- Years active: 2010–present
- Parent(s): Greg Stone; Rebekah Robertson

Georgie Robertson Stone OAM (born 2000) is an Australian actress, writer and transgender rights advocate. At the age of 10, Stone was the youngest person to receive hormone blockers in Australia, which set a precedent that eventually changed the law to remove the requirement that transgender children and their families apply to the Family Court of Australia to access stage one treatment. She continues to advocate for transgender children, and is one of the most visible transgender people in Australia. She is also known for her role as Mackenzie Hargreaves in Neighbours.

== Early life ==
Georgie Stone was born to parents Greg Stone and Rebekah Robertson. Stone attended Elwood College 2013-2018 and was co-school captain in 2018. Stone began studying a Bachelor of Arts at The University of Melbourne in 2019.

== Career ==
=== Activism ===
"The involvement of the Family Court in the medical decisions of transgender teens is actually harming those children it is supposed to protect"

— Stone on the court process

In 2013, her family and lawyers appealed to the full bench of the Family Court of Australia to change the law so children did not have to go to court for permission to access stage 1 and stage 2 treatment of gender-affirming hormones. The decision for stage 1 was handed down but remained in stage 2. It was until 30 November 2017, the Full Court of the Family Court issued a ruling which removed the requirement for court approval of Stage 2 where the child, the family and medical staff all agreed.

In 2014, Stone appeared on Four Corners, talking about her experiences in court and changing the law surrounding stage one treatment. In February 2016, Stone and a number of other families of transgender children travelled to Canberra to speak to politicians about changing the law. Stone and her mother were interviewed on The Project in response to the controversy surrounding the Safe Schools Coalition and the importance of the program. Later that year, Stone and her family appeared on Australian Story, telling their story.

Stone started a petition on change.org in August 2016, rallying support for law reform. Stone has also spoken out in support of transgender children being allowed to use the bathroom of their choice, the importance of the Safe Schools Coalition, and the Pride Centre located in St Kilda.

Stone was a judge of the 2017 GLOBE Community Awards. Stone also featured in the ABC Me television series, Advice to My 12-Year-Old-Self, which aired on 11 October in celebration of the United Nations' International Day of the Girl. The show consists of 37 interviews, all lasting two minutes in length, of prominent Australian women. In late 2017, Stone was made the official ambassador for the Royal Children's Hospital Gender Service in Melbourne.

In 2018, Stone became the ambassador for the Human Rights Arts and Film Festival, Wear it Purple Day and the AFL Pride Game. In 2019, Stone was named an Ambassador for The Pinnacle Foundation.

In June 2022, a 28-minute documentary about her life, The Dreamlife of Georgie Stone, written by Stone and directed by Maya Newell, had its world premiere at the Tribeca Film Festival in New York City and then its Australian premiere at Sydney Film Festival. The film was co-produced by Stone, Newell, Sophie Hyde, and others. It was released worldwide on Netflix on 22 September 2022.

=== Acting ===
In March 2019, Stone joined Australian television soap opera Neighbours in the guest role of Mackenzie Hargreaves. She plays the first ever transgender character on the show, having pitched the role to the show's producers a year earlier. Stone began filming her scenes in June, with the episodes to be aired later in the year. Stone described Mackenzie as "a bit world weary, a bit cynical, a bit hardened by her experiences". She also described her as "sweet, compassionate and lovely" when she opens up to other people.

In September 2019, it was announced that Stone would appear in a spin-off titled Neighbours: Erinsborough High, reprising her role from the main show. The series was released on My5 and 10 Play in November, and comprised five episodes that "explore issues universally troubling teens today – bullying, mental illness, sexuality, cultural diversity, parental and peer pressure, and teacher-student relationships". On 19 October 2019, it was announced that Stone would be promoted to the regular cast in early 2020. She co-wrote an episode of Neighbours with executive producer Jason Herbison, which aired in July 2020.

For her performance, Stone was nominated for 'Best Daytime Star' at the 2020 Inside Soap Awards.

Stone left Neighbours in 2024. Stone reprised the role as Mackenzie for Neighbours' final episode in 2025.

== Personal life ==
Stone lives in Melbourne, Australia. She has a twin brother, Harry Stone. Stone commenced taking puberty blocking treatment in 2011, the youngest in Australia to commence stage-one treatment (she was 10 at the time). In 2015, at age 15, she started hormone replacement therapy. In 2018, she had gender-affirming surgery. Since 2014, Stone has been public about her gender identity.

== Filmography ==
=== Film ===
Year	Title	Role	Notes	Ref.
2022	The Dreamlife of Georgie Stone	Herself	Documentary short	

=== Television ===
Year	Title	Role	Notes	Ref.
2014	Four Corners	Herself	Episode: Being Me	
2016	Australian Story	Herself	Episode: About A Girl	
2019–2024; guest 2025	Neighbours	Mackenzie Hargreaves	Main cast	
2019	Neighbours: Erinsborough High	Mackenzie Hargreaves	5 episodes	
2024	Neighbours Does Hard Quiz	Herself		

== Awards and recognition ==
- 2016: GLBTI Person of the Year from the GLOBE Community Awards, the youngest ever recipient
- 2016: Making a Difference award from the Anti-Defamation Commission, the youngest ever recipient
- 2016: featured in the list of "25 LGBTI Australians to Watch in 2017" by the Gay News Network
- 2018: Young Australian of the Year in Victoria
- 2017: Winner of the Human Rights Awards
- 2020: Medal of the Order of Australia, the youngest person to be recognised that year

Year	Organisation	Award	Work	Result	Ref
2016	GLOBE Community Awards	GLBTI Person of the Year	—N/a	Won	
2016	Anti-Defamation Commission	Making a Difference Award	—N/a	Won	
2017	Liberty Victoria	Young Voltaire Award	—N/a	Won	
2017	Human Rights Awards	Young People's Human Rights Medal	—N/a	Won	
2018	Australian of the Year Awards	Victorian Young Australian of the Year	—N/a	Won	
2018	Australian of the Year Awards	Young Australian of the Year	—N/a	Nominated	
2018	Australian LGBTI Awards	Hero of the Year	—N/a	Nominated	
2019	Australian LGBTI Awards	Hero of the Year	—N/a	Won	
2019	7News Young Achiever Awards	Victorian Young Achiever of the Year	—N/a	Nominated	
2019	7News Young Achiever Awards	Create Change Award	—N/a	Won	
2019	7News Young Achiever Awards	People's Choice Award	—N/a	Nominated	
2020	Inside Soap Awards	Best Daytime Star	Neighbours	Nominated	
2022	Inside Soap Awards	Best Daytime Star	Neighbours	Nominated	

== See also ==
- List of transgender people
- Transgender rights in Australia
