= List of Neighbours characters introduced in 2025 =

Neighbours is an Australian television soap opera. It was first broadcast on 18 March 1985 and airs on Amazon Prime Video in the UK and US, RTÉ in Ireland and Network 10 in Australia. The following is a list of characters that first appear in the show in 2025, by order of first appearance. All characters are introduced by the show's executive producer Jason Herbison. Clint Hendry (Jason Wilder) and Taye Obasi (Lakota Johnson) made their debuts in January. Fallon Morell (Kate Connick), Ken Obasi (Charles Allen) and Maddy Murphy (Emma Horn) made their first appearances in February. Agnes Adair (Anne Charleston) and Thomas Murphy (Charlie Lyon) debuted in March. Sandra Jago (Natassia Halabi) first appeared in April. Colton Keys (Jakob Ambrose) was introduced in May. Yvette Ramsay (Libby Tanner) and Saskia Ramsay (Mia Foran) arrived in June. Monte Jones (Dennis Coard) and Greg Murphy (Gary Sweet) arrived in September. Addison Rutherford (Florence Gladwin) debuted from October.

== Clint Hendry ==
Clint Hendry
- Neighbours character
- Portrayed by: Jason Wilder
- First appearance: 21 January 2025
- Last appearance: 11 December 2025
- Introduced by: Jason Herbison
In-universe information
- Occupation: Cleaner
- Daughters: Addison Rutherford

Clint Hendry, played by Jason Wilder, made his debut on 21 January 2025. The character was previewed in a Neighbours promotional trailer released on 19 December 2024. Clint was revealed to be a man that Jane Harris (Annie Jones) meets online dating. The trailer also shows Jane's son Byron Stone (Xavier Molyneux) being concerned over her and Clint's age gap. It was later revealed that Clint would "refuse to let Jane go so easily" and would ask her to "consider another date". Clint last appeared on 27 February 2025. The following day, Wilder confirmed his departure from the show and revealed he "had the best time working" with Jones on the storyline. He added "I know for a lot of fans it didn't end the way they wanted it to. But let's face it, it wouldn't be that fun if it was all smooth sailing."

Clint arranges a date with Jane, but she is embarrassed by their age gap. Jane is hesitant about dating Clint, but they arrange another date, where he befriends Jane's son Byron. Clint secures a cleaning job at Erinsborough High School, which causes Jane to end their romance. He secures a secondary cleaning job at the Eirini Rising retirement complex and impresses residents Vera Punt (Sally-Anne Upton) and Gino Esposito (Shane McNamara). Jane tries to avoid Clint, but changes her mind and has sex with him in an empty apartment in Eirini Rising. Owner Terese Willis (Rebekah Elmaloglou) reveals that residents have complained about hearing sexual noises coming from the apartment. He denies all knowledge and they use the apartment for sex again. Terese reveals that cleaning supplies have been stolen and asks Clint if he knows anything. Terese and Moira Tohu (Robyn Arthur) find a used condom in the apartment and realise someone is using it to have sex in. Student Jasmine Stewart (Frankie Mazzone) is accused of stealing the cleaning supplies and defends herself by revealing Clint and Jane's relationship to Terese. She is angry that Clint and Jane have been having sex at her business and fires him. Jasmine's parents complain to the Department of Education and Lana Kline (Elizabeth Parisi) decides to suspend Jane for having an inappropriate relationship with a work colleague. Clint continues to support Jane and repairs her friendship with Terese.

Jane agrees to support Clint and offers to defend his reputation at her meeting with Lana. Jane's daughter, Nicolette Stone (Hannah Monson) decides to help Jane discover who the thief is. She purchases cleaning supplies via an online shopping website and goes to pick-up the items. Upon their arrival, they discover that Clint is the thief and has a garage full of stolen cleaning supplies. Clint tries to convince Jane he is stealing to support his sick mother. Jane refuses to listen to his lies and reports him to the police.

== Taye Obasi ==
Taye Obasi
- Neighbours character
- Portrayed by: Lakota Johnson
- First appearance: 23 January 2025
- Last appearance: 11 December 2025
- Introduced by: Jason Herbison
In-universe information
- Occupation: Manager of the Lassiters Piano Bar
- Father: Ken Obasi
- Half-sisters: Remi Varga-Murphy
- Nephews: JJ Varga-Murphy; Dex Varga-Murphy

Taye Obasi, played by Lakota Johnson, made his first appearance on 23 January 2025. The character was announced on 14 October 2024 via the official Neighbours Instagram account. The account released a promotional photograph of Johnson on set. Johnson was hired as a regular cast member. Teasing the character's introduction, a publicist stated "Taye is sure to break some rules (and some hearts) on Ramsay Street." Taye is the brother of Remi Varga-Murphy (Naomi Rukavina).

Taye's debut was first confirmed in a Neighbours promo showing what's in store for 2025. Spoilers for January 2025 show Taye spending time at the Waterhole with his nephews JJ (Riley Bryant) and Dex Varga-Murphy (Marley Williams). Executive producer Jason Herbison told Johnathon Hughes from Radio Times that Taye is the younger half brother of established character Remi Varga-Murphy on her father's side. He adds that they have "a significant age difference and they've grown up somewhat estranged." It was also revealed that Johnson initially auditioned for a different role, which impressed producers, leading them to create the role of Taye just for him.

Taye hides out in the sunroom of number 32, and steals the food that Andrew Rodwell (Lloyd Will) brings over for JJ and Dex. Andrew hears movements, and approaches Taye with a cricket bat. JJ and Dex return from New York and spot Taye in the sunroom, before asking Andrew to go and get them some dinner. Dex allows him to stay in secret on the condition he keep a low profile. He unknowingly befriends neighbour Max Ramsay (Ben Jackson), and jumps into his backyard to hide from Andrew. Taye messes up the house while JJ and Dex are at school, which Andrew sees and asks JJ to clean it up. He throws a party at the house and gets Dex into drinking, before Remi and Cara Varga-Murphy (Sara West) return home. Taye is embarrassed to see Remi, but she asks him to stay for a while so they can catch up. He befriends Fallon Morell (Kate Connick) and she vents to him about her sister Krista Sinclair (Majella Davis).

== Fallon Morell ==
Fallon Morell
- Neighbours character
- Portrayed by: Kate Connick
- First appearance: 3 February 2025
- Last appearance: 2 April 2025
- Introduced by: Jason Herbison
In-universe information
- Half-sisters: Krista Sinclair

Fallon Morell, played by Kate Connick, made her first appearance on 3 February 2025. The character and Connick's casting details were announced on 28 October 2024. She has joined the cast in a guest capacity. Fallon was confirmed to be the sister of an established character. The show's social media accounts teased her arrival, saying she would "wreak havoc on Erinsborough" and cause trouble for many of its residents. Speaking to Radio Times, executive producer Jason Herbison revealed that Fallon is the "younger sister of Krista Sinclair (Majella Davis) from her mother's side," and was "raised in the US with her American father." He also added that Fallon and Krista had very different upbringings and are "very different people". Fallon departed the series on 2 April 2025.

Spoiler pictures for 2025 show Fallon arriving in Erinsborough and meeting with Sebastian Metcalfe (Rarmian Newton), before going to Krista's Lassiters apartment. Spoilers reveal that Krista will be "shaken up by [Fallon's] declaration of arrival, and the next day reveals that Krista will welcome Fallon "into her life, oblivious to her disapproval", showing that she may have an ulterior motive in coming to Erinsborough. Additional spoilers revealed that Fallon will be employed by Krista's fiancé Leo Tanaka (Tim Kano) at his vineyard, Yorokobi, where she will "bond with Leo". Advanced spoilers written by Daniel Kilkelly from Digital Spy reveal that "Fallon has her own complicated backstory with Sebastian", stating that they were "once in a relationship" and that "she even asked him to marry her", to which he responded by leaving and "ghosting her". He goes on to write that Sebastian "developed feelings for [Krista] during their relationship", and discovering that he "wasn't in love with Fallon anymore", which led him to ultimately "cut all contact." We also discover that Fallon is left "upset" and confused about "what part Krista played in the breakdown of her relationship".

Fallon watches Sebastian kiss Krista before turning up at her apartment unannounced, and Krista insists she move in. She meets Sebastian at Grease Monkeys, who explains that he loved Krista while they were together. Taye Obasi (Lakota Johnson) befriends Fallon and they drink together at the Waterhole. Fallon gets to know Krista's fiancé Leo. Krista and Leo hire Fallon as their wedding planner and she offers to help Leo and Byron Stone (Xavier Molyneux) with setting up the Yorokobi winery for a wedding. Fallon continues to be distant from Krista and is concerned she is keeping secrets from Leo. She confides her worries in Taye, who convinces her to keep Krista's secret to her own advantage. Fallon is happy when Krista reveals the truth about Sebastian and convinces her to tell Leo. Krista fails to tell Leo, so Fallon intervenes and reveals the truth, pretending that she thought Leo already knew. Fallon continues to question Leo after he decides to continue planning his wedding. Fallon is shocked when Taye gets a job working for Krista at the Piano Bar and asks him to keep her secrets. Taye picks up that Fallon has feelings for Leo, which she abruptly denies. Taye later asks Fallon if she can get a loan of Krista for him to pay an expensive piano bar performer, and when she says she can't, he threatens reveal all to Krista, so she reluctantly agrees.

Krista borrows Fallon's wedding dress without asking and spills wine on it. Fallon argues with Krista and reveals to Leo about the significance of the dress. Taye apologises to Fallon and she reveals her resentment towards Krista. Fallon's romantic feeling for Leo continue to grow and she tells Taye she plans on causing trouble. She then reveals Sebastian is returning to Erinsborough.

== Ken Obasi ==
Ken Obasi, played by Charles Allen, appeared on 13 February 2025. The character and Allen's casting details were revealed on 9 February 2025 via advance storyline spoilers. Ken is introduced as the father of established characters Remi Varga-Murphy (Naomi Rukavina) and Taye Obasi (Lakota Johnson). Ken arrives in Erinsborough to ask Taye to return home with him, but he refuses to leave. Iona Rowan from Digital Spy reported that Remi and Taye "realise that Ken has been the one keeping them apart all these years."

Ken arrives at number 30 Ramsay Street and asks Remi and Taye to stop fighting. He asks Taye to come back home with him to Appollo Bay, and he and Remi realise that Ken has been keeping them apart because of his affair with Taye's mum. Remi allows Taye to stay in Erinsborough, and Ken spends time with his grandsons JJ (Riley Bryant) and Dex Varga-Murphy (Marley Williams).

== Maddy Murphy ==
Maddy Murphy, played by Emma Horn, made her first appearance on 17 February 2025. The character was first announced on 10 February 2025 via advance storyline spoilers. Maddy is the cousin of established characters Cara Varga-Murphy (Sara West) and Chelsea Murphy (Viva Bianca). Daniel Kilkelly from Digital Spy revealed that Maddy's introduction occurs following Cara's friend, Nicolette Stone (Hannah Monson) deciding to help track down her sister, Chelsea. She was pregnant and Maddy is a mid-wife and they believe she may know her whereabouts. Kilkelly added that Nicolette would "strike up a romantic spark" with Maddy and discover that Maddy knows more information about Chelsea, after finding a bottle of her perfume. Cara confronts Maddy who reveals she helped Chelsea give birth but has since moved on.

Cara and Nicolette visit Maddy's house and ask her if she has seen Chelsea. Maddy denies having seen her and invites them into her home. Maddy begins to flirt with Nicolette and later contacts her to hook-up for sex. The following morning, Nicolette finds a bottle of Chelsea's perfume and realises that Maddy is lying. Cara confronts Maddy, who reveals that she helped Chelsea give birth but she left soon after. She claims that Chelsea does not want Cara to find her and berates both Cara and Nicolette for tricking her. Maddy visits Nicolette at work and asks her if she would be interested in dating. Nicolette is unsure and asks Cara for advice, but she does not want them to date because she has not told her wife, Remi Varga-Murphy (Naomi Rukavina) that she is looking for Chelsea. Nicolette tells Maddy they cannot date and Remi sees them together. Remi shares drinks with Maddy, Cara and Nicolette, who tell unconvincing lies about why Maddy is in town. She continues to hook up with Nicolette in secret. Cara and Remi visit Nicolette while Maddy is with her. She hides from them but Cara notices Nicolette probably has company. Cara catches them together and berates them ignoring her request that they refrain from getting together. Months later, Nicolette invites her back to Ramsay Street and introduces her to her mother Jane Harris (Annie Jones), and they hang out and have sex.

== Agnes Adair ==
Agnes Adair
- Neighbours character
- Portrayed by: Anne Charleston
- First appearance: 17 March 2025
- Last appearance: 27 May 2025
- Introduced by: Jason Herbison
In-universe information
- Occupation: Retired psychiatrist
- Family: Ramsay; Robinson
- Husband: William (deceased)
- Daughters: Jacqueline
- Grandfathers: Roger Adair

Agnes Adair, played by Anne Charleston, made her first appearance on 17 March 2025. Charleston, who previously played Madge Bishop, was first announced in December 2024, to be returning to the show playing a new character as part of the exit storyline for Madge's husband, Harold Bishop (Ian Smith). The official character details were revealed on 10 March 2025, through spoilers for the Neighbours 40th Anniversary week. Spoilers reveal that Agnes will "take interest" in the story of Erinsborough display in the Lassiters complex, and will be "particularly drawn" to an artwork showing Madge. Spoiler pictures show Agnes meeting JJ Varga-Murphy (Riley Bryant), who will be "struck by how similar she is to Madge". Her debut was previewed in a promotional trailer released on the show's social media platforms, which reveals that JJ will introduce Agnes to Hilary Robinson (Anne Scott-Pendlebury) and Harold. Advanced spoiler photos show Agnes and Harold spending time together at Eirini Rising. Agnes was added to the show's opening titles alongside Smith. After Smith's departure, Agnes appeared in the opening titles alongside Hilary, Gino Esposito (Shane McNamara), Vera Punt (Sally Anne-Upton) and Moira Tohu (Robyn Arthur).

Agnes views a picture of Madge in the Lassiter's complex and is approached by JJ, who comments on how similar she looks to Madge. JJ and his girlfriend Nell Rebecchi (Ayisha Salem-Towner) sneakily take a picture of her while she isn't looking. JJ later approaches her at Harold's Cafe and convinces her to do a tour of Eirene Rising. Agnes arrives at Eirene and meets Harold, who mistakes her for Madge. She asks Hilary where JJ is and is introduced to Karl Kennedy (Alan Fletcher) and Susan Kennedy (Jackie Woodburne), who are shocked at her resemblance to Madge. Agnes goes to leave, but JJ convinces her to do a tour. She is impressed by the facilities, but is reluctant to move due to making Harold uncomfortable. She later sees JJ and Harold's café who apologizes, and they bump into Harold and Max Ramsay (Ben Jackson). She and Harold bond over a coffee, and he invites her to look through some of his family history, to see if she has a connection to Madge. Agnes arrives the next day to meet JJ and Harold, but Harold finds it too overwhelming and leaves. She and JJ find out that Madge is her second cousin. Agnes meets with Karl and Susan and she decides to move into Eirene Rising after Harold's approval. Susan helps settle her into her apartment, and she invites Harold over, where she tells him that she and Madge are related.

Agnes and Harold continue to spend time together, before he tells her he is moving to Queensland. He assures her it is not due to her presence, and suggests they stay in touch as pen pals. Agnes attends Harold's farewell party on Ramsay Street, and he and Jane Harris (Annie Jones) show her around he and Madge's old home. She later expresses her loneliness to Susan since Harold left, and she tries to cheer her up by getting Moira to find an activity for them to do. Agnes shows annoyance towards Moira, which angers her and she storms off. She later finds out that her publisher has declined her book. After her daughter cancels their mothers day catch up, Agnes goes to the Lassiters fair with Max and tries to avoid Moira. She later passes on a copy of her book to Harold, who informs her that a Port Douglas publisher is interested in it. Max visits Agnes and drops her off a copy of their family tree. She tells him about the publisher and he encourages her to move to Port Douglas. Susan encourages her to go and surprise Harold. Agnes knocks on Harold's door, and he invites her in for tea.

== Thomas Murphy ==
Thomas Murphy
- Neighbours character
- Portrayed by: Charlie Lyon
- First appearance: 17 March 2025
- Last appearance: 10 June 2025
- Introduced by: Jason Herbison
In-universe information
- Other names: Thomas Murphy
- Father: Jeffrey Swan
- Mother: Chelsea Murphy
- Aunts: Cara Varga-Murphy
- First cousins: JJ Varga-Murphy; Dex Varga-Murphy
- Other relatives: Maddy Murphy

Thomas Matthew Murphy-Robinson, played by Charlie Lyon, made his first appearance on 17 March 2025. Thomas' debut was first previewed in spoilers released by Digital Spy on 10 March 2025. He is the new-born baby of Chelsea Murphy (Viva Bianca), who was revealed to be pregnant in the Neighbours 2024 season finale. Further spoilers revealed a paternity mystery storyline about whether Thomas' father is Chelsea's ex fiancé Paul Robinson (Stefan Dennis) or Jeffrey Swan (Tim Potter), the man she cheated on Paul with. However, advance spoilers revealed that a DNA test confirms Paul is his father. Thomas is named after the Neighbours digital producer and storyline, Thomas Sage. Bianca revealed that in scenes featuring Thomas, the scripts detailed either "Thomas actual" or "Thomas doll". She explained that "Thomas actual" meant that Lyons would be featured in the scenes instead of a doll. Bianca described filming with him as a "really special" experience.

Advance spoilers reveal that Jeffrey would return to the series to meet up with Chelsea, as he "drops a bombshell on her'' regarding Thomas. Further spoilers posted by Digital Spy reveal that Jeffrey "switched the paternity test results" upon hearing of them, meaning that he is Thomas' biological father.

Thomas and Chelsea arrive on Ramsay Street to stay with his aunt Cara Varga-Murphy (Sara West). Thomas warms up to Paul, before a paternity test reveals that he is his father. Thomas and Paul develop a close bond, which upsets his partner Terese Willis (Rebekah Elmaloglou). Gino Esposito (Shane McNamara) comments on how cute Thomas is when he meets him in public. Chelsea and Paul throw Thomas a naming day, where they enjoy time together as a family unit. He goes for a sleepover at Paul and Terese's house, but gets sick so Chelsea picks him up. Paul requests that Thomas stay away from Chelsea's new boyfriend Darcy Tyler (Mark Raffety).

== Sandra Jago ==
Sandra Jago, played by Natassia Halabi, made her first appearance on 15 April 2025. The character and Halabi's casting details were announced on 31 March 2025 via Digital Spy. Sandra attends Andrew Rodwell's (Lloyd Will) self-defense classes and "appears to take a shine to" him. Reporter Daniel Kilkelly later revealed that Sandra would become be a temptress towards Andrew, who is oblivious to her intentions. He added that Andrew's neighbours warn him about Sandra's flirtation. A Neighbours publicist told Kilkelly that "Andrew is flattered when Sandra lavishes praise on him for the work he's been doing to boost everyone's confidence, in Andrew's eyes, Sandra's kind words seem innocent enough." They added that the characters of Max Ramsay (Ben Jackson) and Holly Hoyland (Lucinda Armstrong Hall) would be "cringing over her attempts to create a romantic vibe" between herself and Andrew.

Sandra attends Andrew's self-defense class and is partnered with Max. His girlfriend, Holly sees Sandra put her hand on Max's leg and accuses her of trying to seduce him. Holly performs an impromptu defense move on Sandra, which hurts her and Max explains he allowed Sandra to touch his leg. She attends the follow-up self defense classes and starts flirting with Andrew, who is oblivious. Holly and Max warn Andrew that Sandra is into him. Sandra asks to go for a coffee with Andrew, but he tells her he is married. Sandra continues to flirt with Andrew in front of his wife Wendy Rodwell (Candice Leask), and asks him to massage her shoulder. She is later approached by Wendy at Harold's café and tells her not to blame her if she and Andrew have communication problems. Nicolette Stone (Hannah Monson) later spots Sandra messaging a man on a dating app with the same tattoo as Andrew.

== Colton Keys ==
Colton Keys, played by Jakob Ambrose, made his first appearance on 21 May 2025. The character details were announced on 13 April 2025 via spoilers published by Daniel Kilkelly from Digital Spy. He reported that Colton is introduced as a new love interest for Aaron Brennan (Matt Wilson). The two meet while on holiday at Hamilton Island in Queensland. Ambrose had previously been featured in a cast and crew promotional image that was taken during location filming at the island. In his debut storyline, Aaron flirts with Colton and tries "to pretend to be someone else", called Charlie. The reporter added that the pair have sex but Colton "discovers a photo" of Aaron's dead husband David Tanaka (Takaya Honda) and would "demand an explanation" from him.

Colton meets Aaron by the pool and the two become friendly, after Aaron calls himself Charlie and says he is from Sydney. They then go for a swim and a snorkel together on the beach, before Colton leans in for a kiss. They then have sex in Aaron's villa, and Colton stumbles across a photo of Aaron with his deceased husband David and daughter Isla Tanaka-Brennan (Hannah Abe-Tucker). Aarons reveals his true identity, and Colton leaves. He later arrives in Erinsborough and approaches Aaron while he is on a date with Rhett Norman (Liam Maguire) and tells him he has a job interview at Eirene Rising, and he is hired as assistant manager by Terese Willis (Rebekah Elmaloglou). Colton invites Aaron to dinner, before showing up to his house with a gift. While at the Waterhole, he introduces Colton to Cara (Sara West) and Remi Varga-Murphy (Naomi Rukavina), and Remi is impressed by him. He later invites Aaron to a yoga class where they run into Rhett, and they both try to compete for Aaron's attention. They meet up again to go for a run together. Colton helps calm down Vera Punt (Sally-Anne Upton) after she threatens to leave Eirene Rising due to resident doctor Darcy Tyler's (Mark Raffety) arrest. He runs into Aaron while on break, who offers to have sex at his house, but Colton declines.

After moving into Number 32, Colton goes to a café somewhere in Melbourne to meet Zac Willis (Alex Kaan), who has a profile on a dating app that Bolton came across. Zac just came from the airport and reveals to Colton that he doesn't live in Melbourne but hopes to depending on a job interview and that he was born there. The chemistry between the two is evident, with Colton revealing to Zac that he came from Queensland and chose to stay at first because of a love triangle situation that he lost out, then a new job opportunity. When the subject of aged care came up, Zac mentions he has some family in the same business. Zac then has to go to his job interview, but tells Colton that he will see him again and kisses him before going. After the date, Colton goes to the Waterhole and joins Leo Tanaka (Tim Kano) and Krista Tanaka (Majella Davis) to celebrate him moving to Ramsay Street. Colton mentions to them that there is a man he has his sights on but before he can say anymore Zac arrives and Krista introduces him as the new assistant manager for the Lassiter's Hotel to them. Colton reveals to her that he and Zac met before and Zac is surprised that Colton lives in Erinsborough. After Leo and Krista leave, Colton offers to buy Zac a drink but the latter asks for a raincheck because he has family to visit. Colton later sees Zac again on Ramsay Street, revealing to him that he just moved into Number 32 and learns that Zac is Terese Willis's nephew. Colton explains to Zac that he and Terese are colleagues since the company he worked for went into partnership with Eirini Rising and realises that Terese is the relative that Zac has who works in aged care. Colton asks Zac if he would like to come over to his place but Zac, who becomes cool and distant suddenly, turns him down and tells Colton that even though it was really nice to meet him (Colton) he (Zac) didn't felt there was a spark.

== Saskia Ramsay ==
Saskia Ramsay
- Neighbours character
- Portrayed by: Mia Foran
- First appearance: 24 June 2025
- Last appearance: 31 July 2025
- Introduced by: Jason Herbison
In-universe information
- Occupation: Student
- Family: Ramsay
- Father: Shane Ramsay
- Mother: Yvette Ramsay
- Brothers: Max Ramsay
- Grandfathers: Max Ramsay
- Grandmothers: Maria Ramsay

Saskia Ramsay, played by Mia Foran, will make her first appearance on 24 June 2025. Foran's casting was announced by the film and television organisation, AACTA. They revealed that Saskia will be an ongoing guest role for Foran and that the character will be the daughter of Shane Ramsay (Peter O'Brien). Daniel Kilkelly from Digital Spy confirmed that Saskia is the sister of Max Ramsay (Ben Jackson), adding she arrives on Ramsay Street with her mother Yvette Ramsay (Libby Tanner) to stay with Max. In her introductory storyline, Yvette wants Saskia to live in Erinsborough permanently because she had been bullied at her previous school. Max agrees she can live with him at his share house. It was also confirmed that Saskia would have a romantic interest in her housemate Byron Stone (Xavier Molyneux) and kisses him.

Saskia and Yvette arrive at number 32 Ramsay street and are greeted by Max and his girlfriend Holly Hoyland (Lucinda Armstrong Hall). Max notices Saskia brought a lot of bags and Yvette requests that she can live with him after she had experienced bullying in Queensland. She meets Max's housemates Byron and Taye Obasi (Lakota Johnson), and they allow her to move in. Saskia starts at Erinsborough High School and meets peers and neighbours JJ (Riley Bryant) and Dex Varga-Murphy (Marley Williams), as well as new teacher and neighbour Wendy Rodwell (Candice Leask) who attempts to support her. Max throws her a welcome party, and she attempts to seduce Byron and leans in to kiss him, but he pulls away. She is introduced to Nell Rebecchi (Ayisha Salem-Towner) and Byron's ex-girlfriend Sadie Rodwell (Emerald Chan), and points out that she was tense with Byron. She is asked on a date by Dex but declines. Wendy later goes over and gives her some earrings as a welcome gift. Saskia gets teased by Archie Skehill (Ollie Pearce), but Wendy shuts him down. Wendy finds the earrings she gifted Saskia in the bin, and she claims Archie hid them from her. Saskia visits Byron in hospital and makes him feel uncomfortable. She later replaces moisturizer with a chemical that Sadie burns Nicolette Stone's (Hannah Monson) face with. When Byron comes home, Saskia takes care of him, claiming she just wants to help. She insists she now likes Dex and asks him on a date to the movies.

== Yvette Ramsay ==
Yvette Ramsay
- Neighbours character
- Portrayed by: Libby Tanner
- First appearance: 24 June 2025
- Last appearance: 31 July 2025
- Introduced by: Jason Herbison
In-universe information
- Family: Ramsay
- Husband: Shane Ramsay (divorced)
- Sons: Max Ramsay
- Daughters: Saskia Ramsay

Yvette Ramsay, played by Libby Tanner, made her first appearance on 24 June 2025. Tanner's casting was announced via her showcast profile. The character was introduced as the mother of established character Max Ramsay (Ben Jackson), who arrives in Erinsborough alongside her daughter Saskia Ramsay (Mia Foran).

Yvette arrives at number 32 Ramsay Street with Saskia and greets Max and his girlfriend Holly Hoyland (Lucinda Armstrong Hall). She explains to Max that she wants Saskia to live in Erinsborough with him and meets his housemates Byron Stone (Xavier Molyneux) and Taye Obasi (Lakota Johnson), who agree that Saskia can move in with them. Yvette enquires with Jane Harris (Annie Jones) about Saskia attending Erinsborough High School, and she approves of their situation and Saskia starts school. Yvette goes back to Queensland once Saskia settles in. Max later asks her to return after Saskia starts causing trouble, and they apologize to Saskia's boss Susan Kennedy (Jackie Woodburne). The two say their goodbyes and leave Erinsborough together.

== Monte Jones ==
Monte Jones, played by Dennis Coard, made his first appearance on 3 September 2025. The character was first revealed in spoilers written by Daniel Kilkelly from Digital Spy, that say that he purchases an apartment at the Eirini Rising retirement complex, after Susan Kennedy (Jackie Woodburne) convinces him to do so. It is also revealed that Monte is seen as a "celebrity" by residents due to appearing in commercials in the 80's. Monte recurred until the final Eirini Rising scene on 5 November 2025.

Monte is given a tour of Eirini by Susan, who was convinced she recognized him, but he was reluctant to address her suspicions. He is soon recognized by Vera Punt (Sally-Anne Upton) and Moira Tohu (Robyn Arthur), as a coffee advertisement actor from the 1980's. As they are both excited to see him, he soon warms to the attention. Monte buys an apartment in the complex and is disappointed when owner Terese Willis (Rebekah Elmaloglou) fails to recognize him. He later overhears Vera and Gino Esposito (Shane McNamara) complaining about the food and coffee that had been swapped for budget cuts, and he stands up for the management team, convincing Vera and Gino that they are doing all they can to keep the complex running. Monte later offers to help out Vera's young friends Taye Obasi (Lakota Johnson), Sadie Rodwell (Emerald Chan) and Max Ramsay (Ben Jackson) by trying their new skincare products alongside Vera, Moira and Gino. Vera begins to flirt with him which annoys Moira and Gino, and she eventually asks him on a date. Monte attends the makeup exhibition in honor of Amanda Harris (Briony Behets) alongside the other Eirini Rising residents. Vera misses their date and so he goes out with Moira instead, making Vera jealous. He later attends a pottery lesson in the Erini Rising games room, and witnesses Moira and Vera both trying to impress him, before he tells them that he is interested in Hilary Robinson (Anne Scott-Pendlebury), and asks her out on a date.

== Greg Murphy ==
Greg Muphy
- Neighbours character
- Portrayed by: Gary Sweet
- First appearance: 17 September 2025
- Last appearance: 13 November 2025
- Introduced by: Jason Herbison
In-universe information
- Daughters: Cara Varga-Murphy; Chelsea Murphy
- Grandsons: JJ Varga-Murphy; Dex Varga-Murphy; Thomas Murphy
- Nieces: Maddy Murphy

Greg Murphy, played by Gary Sweet, made his first appearance on 17 September 2025. Sweet's casting was announced on 15 June 2025. He filmed his six-week guest stint shortly before Neighbours ended production in July. He told Fiona Bryne of the Herald Sun: "I'm so honoured, it is a bucket list moment, for sure." He also said that there were several reasons why he agreed to appear in the show, including how "great" his character and the storylines are. Greg is Cara Varga-Murphy's (Sara West) father, who is beaten by the Linwell brothers. Cara finds Greg "barely making sense" and he tells her that his attackers wanted revenge on her. Cara invites Greg to stay with her while he recovers, despite their "strained" relationship and his "frosty exterior". Chloe Timms of Inside Soap wrote "the circumstances of their reunion pushes father and daughter together again, giving Cara hope they might properly reconnect."

Cara becomes concerned after her sister Chelsea Murphy (Viva Bianca) informs her that Greg did not answer a scheduled video call while camping. Cara and Andrew Rodwell (Lloyd Will) head to the campsite and find Greg knocked unconscious in his caravan.

== Addison Rutherford ==
Addison Rutherford
- Neighbours character
- Portrayed by: Florence Gladwin
- First appearance: 13 October 2025
- Last appearance: 10 December 2025
- Introduced by: Jason Herbison
In-universe information
- Occupation: Student
- Father: Clint Hendry
- Mother: Shannon Rutherford

Addison Rutherford, played by Florence Gladwin, made her first appearance on 13 October 2025. The character was first teased in spoilers written by Digital Spy as a "mysterious girl" who has been sleeping at Erinsborough High School and accidentally knocks out teacher Wendy Rodwell (Candice Leask). It is also revealed that she will "start to bond" with fellow student JJ Varga-Murphy (Riley Bryant). Further spoilers state that Addison will be taken in by principal Jane Harris (Annie Jones), and a storyline develops as she is discovered to be the daughter of Erinsborough drug dealer Shannon Rutherford (Grace Quealy).

Addison begins squatting at Erinsborough High and sleeps in skip bin. Wendy attempts to lock the bin and Addison jumps out, knocking Wendy unconscious. Jane, Susan Kennedy (Jackie Woodburne) and Colton Keys (Jakob Ambrose) later find her sleeping in a classroom and call child protection. Leila Potts (Jing Xuan-Chan) organizes a foster home for her. Addison befriends JJ and they go for a drink at Harold's café, where manager Nicolette Stone (Hannah Monson) trips on her bag and kicks her out. After Jane sees her at the school again, she invites her to stay at her house. When Jane's daughter Nicolette comes home, she is furious to find Addison in their house, which intimidates her. Addison has trouble sleeping, and Nicolette catches her in the kitchen at night and gives her some essential oils. She hears Nicolette talking about her mother and moves out of Jane's house, claiming to have a new foster home. Addison is later approached by Krista Tanaka (Majella Davis), who comforts her about her mother. Krista and JJ spot her sleeping under the Tram on Power road, and she tells them that she didn't like her foster home. She is later disappointed when Krista receives a message from Shannon that she is not coming for her.

Feeling guilty, Krista offers Addison the spare bedroom at her and her husband Leo Tanaka's (Tim Kano) penthouse. Krista and Nicolette discover that Addison's father is Clint Hendry (Jason Wilder), Jane's ex boyfriend. Addison meets Clint and he explains why he was not a part of her childhood.

== Others ==
Date(s)	Character	Actor	Circumstances
8–16 January	Kendall Kenny	Nicole Chapman	Kendall is a light technician hired by Yasmine Shields to help organise the Erinsborough Lights Up festival. Kendall is not impressed to be working with Holly Hoyland who has a panic attack in her presence. Holly knocks electrical equipment into a pond and ruins a switch. Kendall tells Yasmine that the switch is faulty and must not be used. Yasmine takes the switch and gives it to Holly so she will end up injured.
14 January	Deanna Finley	Lauren McNaught	Deanna attends a AA meeting where she meets Sebastian Metcalfe. She talks with Sebastian and he reveals that he has romantic feelings for Krista Sinclair.
30 January	Chase Bianco	Michael Gillan	Chase arrives at the garage to ask Holly Hoyland for directions. Max Ramsay notices he has a Queensland number plate on his car and hides from him.
11 February	Kasey McGann	Tayla Coad	Kasey meets Holly Hoyland and Sadie Rodwell on Ramsay Street and asks them if they know Max Ramsay. Holly lies and pretends that she has the wrong address. Holly tells Max and he reveals Kasey is his best friend from Queensland. Kasey had previously had her drink spiked and Max gained revenge by drugging her attacker. Holly convinces Max to ask Kasey to return home because her presence may lead his enemies to Erinsborough.
11 February	Jess Ebbs	Kashmala Sameer	Jess and Louie get married and have their wedding reception at Yorokobi. They have a great time and thank their host Leo Tanaka, unaware that just hours earlier the venue was littered with bird excrement.
11 February	Louie Green	Nic Davey-Greene	Jess and Louie get married and have their wedding reception at Yorokobi. They have a great time and thank their host Leo Tanaka, unaware that just hours earlier the venue was littered with bird excrement.
11 February	Patrick Hayes	Wesley Forke	Patrick is Rhett Norman's new boyfriend who introduces himself to Rhett's ex-boyfriend Aaron Brennan.
24 February – 18 March	Lachie Jensen	Jack Hayes	Lachie works for Carter Haddon who wants revenge on Max Ramsay for spiking his drink. Carter follows Sadie Rodwell and Holly Hoyland to a nightclub and mistakenly believes that Sadie is Max's girlfriend. Lachie spikes Sadie's drink and kidnaps her from a nightclub and dumps her the bush. Lachie sees Roxy Willis in The Waterhole and it is clear they already know each other.
25 February	Carter Haddon	Linc Hassler	Carter is an enemy of Max Ramsay from his time in Queensland. Max had spiked his drink as revenge for spiking his friend Kasey McGann. Carter arranges for Sadie Rodwell's drink to be spiked and she is kidnapped from a nightclub and dumped in the bush. Carter finds Max and orders him to get into his car and accompany him or else he will not share Sadie's location. Max agrees and Carter takes his phone and messages Max's friends to pretend he is okay and has moved on from Erinsborough.
25 February	Violinist	Florence Cappler-Shillington	A violinist who performs for Krista Sinclair and Leo Tanaka as they share an early first wedding dance at the Yorokobi vineyard.
27 February	Connie Creek	Judith Roberts	Connie opens her garage door and is approached by Jane Harris and Nicolette Stone. They reveal that they have purchased cleaning supplies via an online market place and demand to know where she acquired the products. Connie reveals that she rents her garage space out to a man. Jane's boyfriend, Clint Hendry arrives and it is revealed he has stolen the products and Jane calls the police.
3 March	Magnus Johnson	Winston Hillyer	Magnus runs a magic show for the residents of Eirini Rising. Terese Willis is shocked when Magnus performs the show semi-nude but the event impresses resident, Vera Punt.
4 March	Doug Irons	Dane Rhoades	Doug rips his wedding shirt at the Yorokobi vineyard and the owner, Leo Tanaka gives Doug his shirt to wear instead.
25 March – 22 April	Detective Rafe Fox	Tom Wren	Rafe comes to Erinsborough from the city to investigate the death of Sebastian Metcalfe. He questions Krista Sinclair, Leo Tanaka and Fallon Morell, and then finds from Aaron Brennan that Leo had a confrontation with Sebastian shortly before his death. He brings Leo in for formal questioning, and on the basis of DNA evidence charges Leo with Sebastian's murder.
25 March – 3 April	Detective Kathleen Kay	Kasia Kaczmarek	Kathleen investigates the murder of Sebastian Metcalfe. She discovers footage of Aaron Brennan at the lake where Sebastian died and questions him. She later helps arrest Leo Tanaka as their main suspect. Kathleen and Andrew Rodwell later interrogate Fallon Morell after she lies about her alibi. She is also present when Fallon makes a false murder confession.
7 April	Jordan's Cronie	Finola Xie	Cara Varga-Murphy takes photos of Jordan Masciulli and her cronie as they converse in the street. They suspect she was taking photos of them and Cara leaves. The following day they presume Cara's wife, Remi Varga-Murphy was taking the photos and confront her. Jordan and the cronie pull Remi from her car and attack her.
15 April – 29 May	Phil Buffett	Indigo Parer	Phil attends Andrew Rodwell's self-defence class and is partnered with Holly Hoyland to practise. Phil later attends another class. Another group member, Sandra Jago believes she is talking to Andrew via a dating app. Andrew realises someone is using his pictures to catfish Sandra. Nicolette Stone decides to arrange a date with the catfish but he does not show up. Holly believes that Archie is the perpetrator. Phil later watches Wendy Rodwell, Cara Varga-Murphy, Nicolette and Andrew from afar before walking away. Andrew sees a photograph sent to Sandra by her catfish, and realises it was taken from a house near to Ramsay Street. Investigating the property, Andrew finds Phil, who attacks him and ties him up. Holly tracks Andrew down and pretends to be romantically interested in Phil to look around further. She finds Andrew and helps to free him.
21 April	Mila Nitschke	Elizabeth Shady	Mila is a former business associate of Chelsea Murphy who attends Darcy Tyler's investment presentation for a wellness centre. Mila shows interest in speaking with Darcy again.
28 April	Ryan Deely	Aston Droomer	Ryan is a pupil at Erinsborough High and he begins to make sly remarks about Nell Rebecchi being a murderer. He is caught passing notes around about Nell by supply teacher, Wendy Rodwell. Dex Varga-Murphy gets into an altercation with Ryan but Wendy removes the latter from the classroom.
29 April – 2 July	Lydia Hardy	Cassandra Magrath	Lydia drinks at the piano bar and asks Taye Obasi if he knows where she can find Byron Stone. Bryon reveals that Lydia is former client from his escorting work. Byron informs Lydia that he no longer escorts but she appears determined to change his mind. Taye learns about their history and introduces himself to Lydia as an escort named Sonny Manhattan. Lydia arranges a date with Taye and he goes along with the idea. He appears nervous but Lydia likes Taye and continues to book him as her escort. Taye eventually decides to stop escorting which upsets Lydia. She is later present at a family meal Taye attends and it is revealed Lydia works at the police academy that Cara Varga-Murphy is training at. Lydia warns Taye that he either resumes their arrangement or she will make Cara's working life difficult. Lydia tampers with Cara's exam dates and Taye agrees to see Lydia again. In return, Lydia postpones Cara's exam dates giving her time to revise.
7 May – 1 July	Archie Skehill	Ollie Pearce	Archie takes part in a self-defence class run by Andrew Rodwell and is partnered with Sandra Jago. She accuses Archie of being inappropriate with her during training. He attempts to defend himself by revealing he is only eighteen and leaves the session. Later Holly Hoyland and Andrew believe Archie is stalking Sandra but Phil Buffett is revealed to be the culprit. He later picks on Saskia Ramsay but is shut down by Wendy Rodwell.
2 June	Sylvie Santino	Chloe Hurst	Sylvie is a escorting client of Taye Obasi who arranges a date in her hotel room while he is working a shift in the piano bar at the same hotel. Taye tries to honour the date with Sylvie but feels uncomfortable. He attempts to have sex with Sylvie but changes his mind and Sylvie takes her money back.
17 June – 29 September	Gretchen Brook	Amelia Bishop	Gretchen is Andrew Rodwell's biological sister who is tracked down by Andrew's wife, Wendy Rodwell. She tells Gretchen that she wanted to check the family were good people before telling Andrew. Gretchen reveals that Andrew's birth mother has died and that his father, Steven Brook, is an alcoholic. Holly Hoyland discovers that Gretchen's revelations about Steven are untrue, so she takes Andrew to visit him. Gretchen apologises for lying and claims she did it to protect Steven, who has lung cancer. Andrew spends the day getting to know Gretchen and Steven.
23 June – 15 July	Steven Brook	Mick Preston	Steven is Andrew Rodwell's biological father. Gretchen Brook previously lied to Andrew's wife, Wendy Rodwell that Steven is an alcoholic. Holly Hoyland discovers that this is untrue so she takes Andrew to visit Steven. Gretchen apologises for lying but reveals that she did so to help her father recover from lung cancer. Steven is happy to meet Andrew and they get to know each other.
