= Chelsea Murphy =

Fictional character from soap opera Neighbours

- Neighbours character
- Portrayed by: Viva Bianca
- Duration: 2024–2025
- First appearance: 18 January 2024
- Last appearance: 10 June 2025
- Introduced by: Jason Herbison
In-universe information
- Occupation: Entrepreneur; Acting manager at Lassiters hotel
- Father: Greg Murphy
- Sisters: Cara Varga-Murphy
- Children: 3 including Thomas Murphy
- Nephews: Dex Varga-Murphy; JJ Varga-Murphy
- First cousins: Maddy Murphy

Chelsea Murphy is a fictional character from the Australian television soap opera Neighbours, played by Viva Bianca. She made her first appearance during the episode broadcast on 18 January 2024. Chelsea is introduced as the sister of Cara Varga-Murphy (Sara West). Chelsea is characterised as an entrepreneur and businesswoman. Bianca described her as "a really effective manipulator" and who has ulterior motives behind her actions. Chelsea is portrayed as scheming against other characters in the show throughout her duration. She arrives in Erinsborough with the intention of romantically pursuing Paul Robinson (Stefan Dennis).

Chelsea seduces Paul and installs herself as manager of Lassiters Hotel, taking advantage of Paul's grief over the death of his son. As her storyline progressed, Bianca believed that Chelsea had genuine feelings for Paul. Writers developed a feud with Krista Sinclair (Majella Davis). This escalates when Chelsea locks her in a sauna room causing the death of Krista's unborn baby. Chelsea attempts to hide her involvement but leaves Erinsborough when her secrets are exposed. Chelsea departed during the episode broadcast on 8 May 2024 and returned on 19 December 2024, in scenes revealing she is pregnant. Chelsea then plots to win back Paul after a DNA test reveals he is the father of her baby Thomas Murphy (Charlie Lyon). A paternity sage then evolves after the man whom Chelsea cheated on Paul with, Jeffrey Swan (Tim Potter), reveals he altered the DNA results and that he is Thomas' father. Chelsea continues to keep Paul close to Thomas, but leaves Erinsborough again when the truth comes out. She departed again during the episode broadcast on 10 June 2025.

Television critics have assessed that Chelsea is "evil", "scheming", "dastardly" and a "devious character". Despite her short tenure, Chelsea's characterisation made her a "divisive character" with viewers generating many differing reactions. This resulted in her becoming a "love-to-hate" figure within the series.

== Development ==
=== Introduction ===
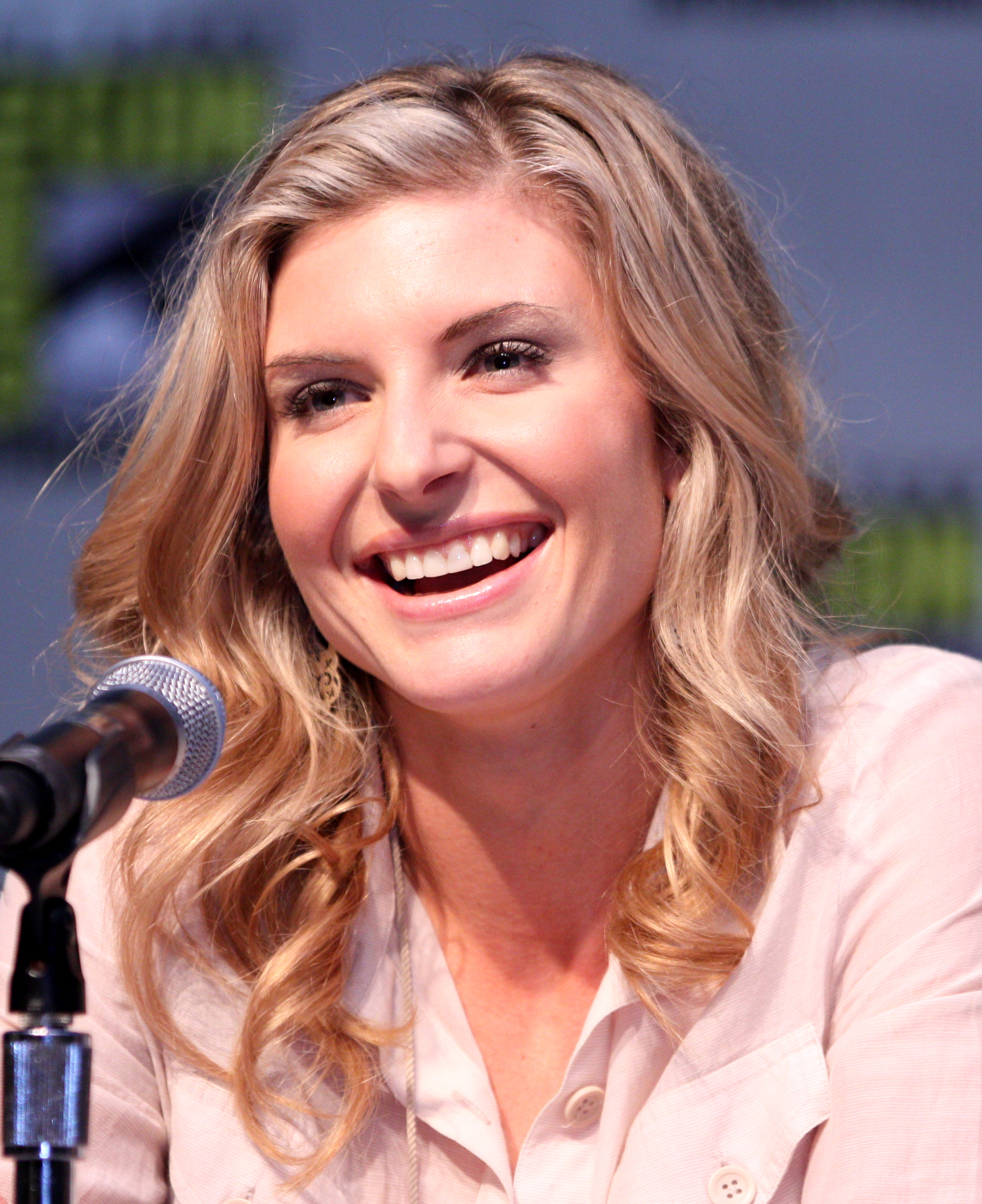
Viva Bianca's (pictured) casting as Chelsea was announced in the United States.

Bianca's casting in an unnamed guest role was announced via a press release issued by Amazon MGM Studios in the United States. The character was announced in advance spoilers and it was revealed she would be introduced as the sister of established character Cara Varga-Murphy (Sara West) who gives her "an unexpected visit". The show officially announced the casting and character details on 14 January 2024. Chelsea is named after the Neighbours crew member Chelsea Chua. Bianca revealed that the part of Chelsea is an extended guest role. In a backstage video, she stated "Chelsea sticks around for a while and has quite a bit of business to tend to, and is determined to do so." Bianca described Chelsea as "a really effective manipulator" and has ulterior motives behind her actions. Bianca added that Chelsea has "always got something else kind of ticking." One of Chelsea's introductory stories involve her romantic pursuit of businessman Paul Robinson (Stefan Dennis). Bianca described Chelsea as "a woman who has a serious agenda and very, very ambitious hopes for her life and sees them through Paul." Dennis added that "it's very blatant that Chelsea is seen as a gold-digger" during her introduction scenes. Bianca revealed that Chelsea would create "major trouble for other people but then in turn herself and she then needs to cover her tracks. And we see lies upon lies and she's burying herself in a hole. And in doing so she becomes quite vulnerable I think and it all becomes very messy for Chelsea."

Susannah Alexander from Digital Spy reported that Chelsea claims to be in Erinsborough to retail her new perfume in Melbourne. She also detailed Chelsea's secret interest in Paul, which is revealed in her introductory scenes. Writers portrayed Cara as delighted to have Chelsea around, but Cara's wife Remi Varga-Murphy (Naomi Rukavina) is annoyed by Chelsea's presence but Cara is defensive over her behaviour. Remi becomes concerned that Chelsea offers relationship advice to her teenage son, JJ Varga-Murphy (Riley Bryant), after he shows interest in the older Sadie Rodwell (Emerald Chan). Chelsea also befriends Cara and Remi's new friends David Tanaka (Takaya Honda) and Aaron Brennan (Matt Wilson).

=== Relationships and scheming ===
Digital Spy's Daniel Kilkelly revealed Chelsea would begin scheming to get closer to Paul. She becomes annoyed when Paul is distracted by his ex-wife, Terese Willis (Rebekah Elmaloglou). Chelsea decides to give herself a make-over inspired by Terese's style to gain Paul's attention. Her plan begins to work as Paul takes notice of her. Bianca enjoyed working on the storyline with Dennis because she had watched the character's stories when she was young. She added "now I'm on set, going head to head with Paul Robinson and working with Stefan almost every day." Advance episode spoilers revealed that Chelsea would continue to be central the show's dramas. This included taking advantage of a grieving Paul after the death of his son David, installing herself as the manager of Lassiters Hotel and feuding with Krista Sinclair (Majella Davis).

Writers developed the rivalry between Chelsea and Paul's ex-wife, Terese, which ends in a confrontation. Chelsea takes revenge by sabotaging a memorial plaque dedicated to Terese's dead son, Josh Willis (Harley Bonner). Chelsea conceals the plaque in rubbish and ensures it is disposed of. Bianca told a TV Week reporter that Chelsea is "triggered" by Paul and Terese's bond. Chelsea realises that Paul and Terese's common experience of losing a child threatens her schemes. Bianca explained that Chelsea is "worried" that she will lose Paul to Terese. She also views Terese as "a successful older woman who has built a robust business for herself – exactly what Chelsea aspires to." Bianca added that Chelsea wants the "financial security" Paul offers, but Chelsea is "falling for Paul" and wants a "genuine and romantic" future with him. She concluded that the confrontation with Terese is a "sucker punch" for Chelsea to overcome. Dennis revealed that "there is this genuine affection underneath" and questioned whether the feelings were "strong enough to create longevity." Elmaloglou and Dennis told a Virgin Radio UK interviewer of their shock at how quickly the show's producer Jason Herbison developed two separate "love triangle" stories which merge into one complicated love entanglement. One features Terese, her husband Toadie Rebecchi (Ryan Moloney) and his ex-wife Melanie Pearson (Lucinda Cowden) and the other features Terese, Paul and Chelsea. Elmaloglou told the radio host that "Paul's got Chelsea and yeah, I think you know, we all love a bit of drama, and we expect it when we work on a show like Neighbours." When Toadie betrays Terese by having sex with Melanie, Paul sees this as an opportunity to grow closer to Terese. Dennis told Ellis (Inside Soap) that Paul's relationship with Chelsea is "the only problem" stopping him from pursuing Terese. He is doing a "juggling act" trying to figure out how to be with both Chelsea and Terese. Elmaloglou added that Terese initially lets Paul spend time with Chelsea instead of being overly reliant on him.

Writers continued displaying Chelsea's scheming when she concocts a plan to become pregnant with Paul's child. Chelsea decides to enact her plan after realising that Paul values family in his will. She faces difficulties in her attempts to become pregnant after Paul dismisses the seriousness of their relationship. Dennis commented that if Chelsea did become pregnant, then Paul "would be really happy." Chelsea becomes enraged when Paul's sister, Lucy Robinson (Melissa Bell) chooses Krista to present an important business meeting. A Neighbours publicist revealed that "Chelsea sees red" and wants to take over the presentation. They added that Chelsea "goes to great lengths to make that happen." Chelsea also continues to manage Lassiters, and repeatedly tries to undermine her rival, Krista. A TV Week reporter revealed that Chelsea's jealousy over Paul heaping praise on Krista leads her to make a drastic move, which leaves both Krista and her unborn baby in danger. Chelsea locks Krista in a sauna so she can take her place in a work presentation, leading Krista to collapse and lose her unborn baby.

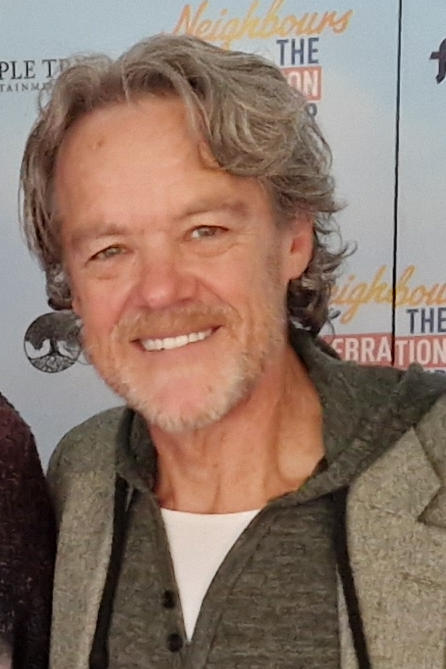
Stefan Dennis (pictured) plays Chelsea's love interest, Paul Robinson.

Writers explored Chelsea and Krista's rivalry over the following episodes. Bianca told Sarah Ellis from Inside Soap that "Chelsea feels threatened by Krista's power." Chelsea envisions herself and Paul as a "power couple" and wants to "shine at Lassiters" to achieve her this. Bianca noted that "Krista already possesses what Chelsea so desperately wants" and she is "envious" of her. She defended her character's behaviour, noting "Chelsea is riddled with guilt" about Krista's miscarriage and it was unintentional that the situation becomes so "awry". Chelsea is also "terrified" about her actions being exposed, likening Chelsea's predicament to a "domino game she's lost total control of." Bianca assessed that it showcased how "extreme" Chelsea is but ultimately she really needs her relationship with Paul to work or "she will land back on her ass". A co-dependent dynamic was written for the characters, as they become reliant on each other to hide their secrets. Bianca described that "they become strangely co-dependent" and "they hold the key to one another's Achilles heel." Chelsea later takes advantage of Krista's grief and tempts Krista into taking drugs. Inside Soap's Ellis reported that Krista would be unaware that Chelsea purposely caused her drugs relapse. Bianca worried that her character's schemes were out of control in this plot and hoped for a redemption story arc. She hoped that Chelsea would achieve her goals of snaring Paul's livelihood and become the "power couple".

Additional spoilers revealed Chelsea's ruthlessness to keep her secrets from being revealed to Paul. The arrival of IT technician Jeffrey Swan (Tim Potter) panics Chelsea, as he has a report on the events leading to Krista's collapse. Jeffrey's report directly implicates Chelsea in the incident. Chelsea becomes determined to convince Jeffrey to doctor his report and makes him an "indecent proposal" in exchange. Jeffrey then pursues a romance with Chelsea, behind Paul's back. Michael Adams from Metro reported that Chelsea is "left embarrassed" because it is "evident" that Jeffrey has "fallen for her".

=== Departure ===
Chelsea's lies unravelled amidst her engagement to Paul. Kilkelly (Digital Spy) reported that "their relationship finally takes a more serious turn", as Paul asks Chelsea to propose to him and he accepts. Paul's son Leo Tanaka (Tim Kano) suspects that Paul is using Chelsea to get over Terese. A Neighbours publicist told Inside Soap's Chloe Timms that Chelsea feels accomplished and has got everything she "worked so hard for - and she's relishing every second". The publicist added that "Krista now knows every horrifying thing Chelsea has done in Erinsborough." They added that "Chelsea's house of card is set to fall" at the exact same time.

Kilkelly reported that Chelsea would have a "nasty shock" as "her luck finally runs out". He added that Chelsea and Paul's engagement party would be ruined by Jeffrey and Krista, after the latter realises "her rival's terrible secret". In a backstage video, Bianca revealed that Chelsea and Paul's engagement party took one day to film. She added that it began "on a high" but ends "tragically, especially for Chelsea." In the aftermath of the reveal, Paul is "thrown into turmoil as he finally realises what Chelsea is capable of." The revelations also affect Cara, who was shaken by all Chelsea had done. Chelsea "abruptly vanished" from Erinsborough and evaded the pursuit of the police.

Chelsea departed during the episode broadcast on 8 May 2024. Bianca wrote a post on her Instagram account revealing that her guest stint on the show had ended, stating "thank you for welcoming me into the Neighbours family. I'm so grateful for the opportunity." Bianca added that working on Chelsea's final episode created "a melting pot of feels". She added that "It's been emotional especially because Paul actually was ready to love Chelsea and Chelsea's dream had come true." She described Chelsea's journey and storyline as a "brisk and giddy rise and then thundering fall". Bianca left her departure open to return, stating "so that's a wrap for Chelsea. For now."

=== Return and baby ===
On 5 December 2024, a writer from Inside Soap revealed that Chelsea would return in scenes featuring her and Cara at an airport. Digital Spy's Kilkelly revealed that Cara briefly notices Chelsea but dismisses what she has seen. He confirmed that Chelsea is back in Melbourne and is pregnant. Her return occurred during the episode broadcast on 18 December 2024, which was the show's 2024 finale episode and served as a cliffhanger storyline. Kilkelly later added that in 2025, Chelsea's return would cause concern for Paul and Terese, who had recently reconciled their relationship. Neighbours' social media accounts also confirmed that Chelsea would return to the show for an "extended stay" in 2025. On 1 January 2025, Neighbours' executive producer Jason Herbison revealed more details about Chelsea's return in an interview with Johnathon Hughes from Radio Times. He stated "she's been at large for almost nine months and there are reasons why she hasn't come forward with her pregnancy sooner. All I can say is – expect the unexpected!" The airport scenes are due to be revisited through flashback on 6 February, revealing that Cara spoke to Chelsea and refused to support her.Writers continued to explore Chelsea's return storyline with the introduction of her cousin, Maddy Murphy (Emma Horn). Cara decides to track Chelsea down but struggles to find her. She decides to ask Maddy for help, who initially claims to be unaware of Chelsea's whereabouts. It is later revealed that Maddy helped Chelsea give birth but she moved on soon after.

The character returns Erinsborough with her newborn baby Thomas Murphy (Charlie Lyon), after Remi tracks her down, which occurred during the show's 40th anniversary week episodes. The story explores Chelsea's arrival and meeting with Paul and Terese on Ramsay Street, where she introduces him to Thomas. A paternity mystery story ensues as Paul and Jeffrey participate in a DNA test to determine Thomas' paternity. Digital Spy's Kilkelly detailed that Cara and Remi move Chelsea and Thomas into their home. Chelsea also claims to have "changed her ways". Jeffrey agrees to be supportive if proven as the father, but is less involved in the story than Paul. Paul is portrayed as being more attentive to Thomas and hopes to be his father. It was also revealed ahead of transmission that Paul is Thomas' biological father.

Of Chelsea's return, Bianca acknowledged that Chelsea left the series as a "disgraced" character. She revealed that "has gone through a lot" during her absence and returns "very humbled and with child". Bianca hoped that it was a chance for Chelsea to "redeem herself". She described filming with Lyons on-set as a "really special" experience. Bianca was unsure if Chelsea still loves Paul, explaining that "I can't say with total conviction that the flame is entirely out in regards to her feelings for Paul." Bianca revealed that playing a villain can be difficult because viewers perceive actors to behave like their characters. She added "I was really grateful to the fans that acknowledged that and the people who hated Chelsea meant we were succeeding at what we were doing."

== Storylines ==
Chelsea arrives to visit the Varga-Murphys and soon offers relationship advice to JJ. Remi becomes concerned with her advice and is annoyed when Chelsea has breakfast with her friends Aaron and David. Remi tells Cara about her concerns but she asks Remi to be more accepting. Chelsea pitches her perfume brand to Paul to become his hotel's, Lassiters, signature fragrance. He allows her to run a pop-up store on the hotel complex. She hires Sadie to help her with the promise of payment. Lassiters Hotel co-manager Krista informs Chelsea she will need to close the store down abruptly because the hotel does not have a permit or insurance. Paul then informs Chelsea that the hotel are concentrating on other business aspects and they will not be able to go into business together. Chelsea continues to pursue Paul and is annoyed when he appears distracted by Terese. Chelsea purchases a business suit and perfume inspired by Terese to impress Paul. Chelsea visits Paul but they are interrupted by Sadie, who asks when she will receive payment for working on her perfume stall. Chelsea berates Sadie for embarrassing her in front of Paul and promises to pay her within thirty days. Chelsea tells Cara she has no money to pay Sadie. Cara lends her money on the condition she does not tell Remi. Remi finds a napkin with the name Chelsea Robinson written on it. Remi confronts Chelsea, who admits she is interested in Paul. She tells Remi that Cara has given her money which causes an argument. Cara asks Chelsea to move out and she goes to stay at Lassiters. Chelsea contacts Paul and they have sex in the hotel room.

Chelsea becomes jealous of Terese supporting Paul following the death of his son, David. Chelsea breaks into Toadie's law firm office to retrieve files regarding Paul and Terese's divorce. Chelsea helps to plan David's funeral to support Paul, but this angers Leo Tanaka (Tim Kano), who accuses her of being a gold-digger. Paul's sister Lucy is suspicious of Chelsea but she manages to get her on side. Chelsea promises Lucy that she will look after Paul and moves into the penthouse. She quickly convinces Paul to allow her to become the acting manager of Lassisters. Chelsea clashes with Krista and tries to deride her plans to host a promotional event. Chelsea makes an order of her perfume brand and bills Lassiters. Krista is annoyed and tells Terese about Chelsea's business transaction. Chelsea becomes annoyed when Terese consoles a grieving Paul. Terese later confronts Chelsea for her perfume deal and accuses her of taking advantage of Paul, which causes an argument. Chelsea enacts revenge by ensuring a memorial plaque dedicated to Terese's dead son, Josh Willis (Harley Bonner), is disposed of. Chelsea gets paranoid when she starts losing control of the hotel, and tries to sabotage Krista's Lassiters Longest Lie-In event by changing the staff rosters. The event is successful and Paul is impressed by Krista, which annoys Chelsea. She accesses Paul's will and tries to convince him to update it to exclude Terese but Paul is reluctant. Chelsea realises that Paul prioritises his family in his will and concocts a new scheme to become pregnant. Chelsea throws away her contraceptive pills and seduces Paul.

Chelsea is annoyed when Lucy selects Krista to pitch her event ideas to Lassiters globally. Chelsea takes over the presentation by locking Krista in a sauna room. Krista subsequently loses her unborn child. Chelsea tries to blame ex-employee Penny Shrewster (Jessica Husband). Paul asks her to move out of the penthouse after Leo and his daughter Abigail Tanaka (Nikita Kato) move back in. She meets IT technician Jeffrey, whose investigation into the sauna incident reveals that Chelsea locked the sauna doors. Chelsea seduces him and gets him to doctor the report findings as non-conclusive and Krista becomes suspicious of them. Chelsea causes Krista to relapse on her drug addiction by placing prescription medication in her presence. Chelsea agrees to keep Krista's secret and begins lying about her whereabouts when she gets intoxicated. Jeffrey returns wanting a relationship with Chelsea and she pretends to reciprocate to prevent her secret from being discovered. Chelsea continues to manipulate Jeffrey and entertains him in her hotel room. Krista delivers alcohol to Chelsea's room and discovers her with Jeffrey. Chelsea threatens Krista to remain silent about their affair or she will reveal Krista's drug relapse to Leo and Paul. Krista gets intoxicated and triggers memories that make her realise Chelsea locked her in the sauna. Chelsea and Krista have a struggle, resulting in Krista being knocked unconscious. Chelsea pretends Krista fell because of her relapse. Krista is taken to hospital and upon her recovery has forgotten why she went to see Chelsea. Chelsea informs Terese that Paul loves her still and is only with her to make her feel comfortable. Terese ends her friendship with Paul when he admits Chelsea is correct. Chelsea inadvertently prompts Krista's memories to return. Chelsea and Paul become engaged, but at their engagement party Krista exposes Chelsea's affair and guilt over the sauna incident. Paul takes Chelsea's engagement ring and asks her to leave. Cara is unable to stop Chelsea from fleeing Erinsborough, after which she evades capture by the police.

Months later, Cara spots Chelsea at the Melbourne airport with a visible baby bump. She catches up with her, and she reveals that the baby could be either Jeffrey or Paul's. Cara asks her to call their mother and never to mention that they saw each other. Cara regrets her actions and tries to reconnect with Chelsea, but cannot locate her. She visits her cousin, Maddy, who pretends to know nothing about Chelsea's whereabouts. Nicolette Stone (Hannah Monson) discovers that Maddy is lying and she tells Cara that she previously helped Chelsea give birth but she moved on soon after. Chelsea then sends Cara a letter requesting that she stops looking for her. Remi later tracks her down and brings her back to Ramsay Street where Chelsea introduces Paul to her son, Thomas. She reveals that either Paul or Jeffrey are Thomas' biological father and they carry out a DNA test. Remi and Cara invite Chelsea to move in and Chelsea assures Terese that she will not affect her relationship with Paul. The DNA results confirm Paul is Thomas' father and she and Thomas visit Paul in his penthouse, which annoys Terese. She attempts to apologies to Krista, who tells Chelsea to stay away from her. Terese later loses her temper at Chelsea as she offers Paul support after Leo's arrest. Chelsea subsequently gets Cara to look after Thomas, and keeps her distance from Paul. Terese later apologizes to her and they agree to cooperate for Paul and Thomas.

Paul later offers to buy Chelsea a new fancy car, claiming to be for Thomas's safety, which annoys Terese. Chelsea spots Darcy Tyler (Mark Raffety) loitering on the end of her driveway and tells him to go away. The two later run into each other and he offers to buy her a drink. Chelsea introduces Darcy to Thomas, before Paul approaches and tells him to back off. Chelsea and Cara arrange naming party for Thomas, and Terese watches over her and Paul becoming closer.

== Reception ==
Following the character's debut, Inside Soap's Sarah Ellis wrote that "Ramsay Street better watch out if Chelsea stays for a while..." Ellis later branded Chelsea a "devious character" who commits "heinous actions". She also assessed "Paul's latest squeeze does have a heart buried deep down." The magazine's Chloe Timms branded her "evil" and a "wicked bride-to-be". She also reviewed that "the Chelsea show has us all gripped". She was eager for Chelsea to be exposed and anticipated a "huge" reaction from Paul. Following Chelsea's departure, Timms did not believe that Chelsea was the type of character to stop scheming and predicted that she is pregnant with Paul's child.

Stephen Patterson from Metro branded the character "scheming Chelsea". He added "Chelsea claims she's got Paul's best interests at heart but we all know what she's really after." Their colleague, Michael Adams added that Chelsea made "vile decisions" during her tenure and her scheming against Krista was "a further cruel act". Adams predicted Chelsea would return for the show's fortieth anniversary with Paul's baby. Digital Spy's Kilkelly branded Chelsea as "Cara's charming sister" who is "never one to pass up an opportunity" and was "laser focused" on seducing Paul. His colleague, Stefania Sarrubba branded her a "schemer" and that Bianca gave a "complex performance as one of the series' villains." Simon Timblick from Whattowatch.com described Chelsea as a "cunning" person. A TV Week writer assessed that ultimately "Chelsea's meddling ways get the better of her".

Pip Ellwood-Hughes from Entertainment Focus stated that Chelsea concocted "evil plans" and noted "how many situations Chelsea has managed to worm her way out of". In another review, Ellwood-Hughes assessed Chelsea was "incredibly divisive" with viewers and she became "the character that viewers love to hate". She added "there's no denying that she's made an impact" and her departure made Neighbours a "little less exciting". The writer noted that Chelsea generated a hefty reaction online in response to her behaviour. She added "you don't have to look far to find a lot of reaction to the character of Chelsea." Ellwood-Hughes branded Chelsea a "dastardly character" and "a master of covering her tracks", adding that her characterisation made it certain she would find "another unsuspecting person to target and manipulate". Ellwood-Hughes later stated that Neighbours became a "little bit pedestrian" without Chelsea and suffered from having no credible villains. He believed Chelsea "kept things interesting" and "added that bit of fire and conflict that every good soap needs", adding she was what made "Neighbours so good" following its revival. He concluded that Neighbours needs a character "to upset the apple cart and cause absolute chaos. That's one of the things Chelsea did so well. She touched upon so many characters and ruined plenty of lives in the process. That's the energy I'm looking for." Michael Darling from Whattowatch assessed that Chelsea "returns to cause more drama as Neighbours celebrates its 40th anniversary."
