= Krista Sinclair =

Fictional character from Neighbours

- Neighbours character
- Portrayed by: Majella Davis
- Duration: 2023–2025
- First appearance: 13 November 2023
- Last appearance: 11 December 2025
- Introduced by: Jason Herbison
In-universe information
- Other names: Kelly Miller; Krista Tanaka
- Occupation: Hotel manager
- Father: Conrad Sinclair
- Half-sisters: Reece Sinclair; Fallon Morell
- Husband: Leo Tanaka (2025–)
- Daughters: Hope Sinclair
- Stepdaughters: Abigail Tanaka

Krista Sinclair (also Tanaka) is a fictional character from the Australian television soap opera Neighbours, played by Majella Davis. She made her first appearance as Krista during the episode broadcast on 13 November 2023. Davis originally auditioned for other regular roles before receiving the part. Krista was introduced during episodes containing a series of flashback scenes exploring stories set during a two-year time jump. Krista was first subject to a missing person story involving her half-sister, Reece Sinclair (Mischa Barton), who arrives to find her. Krista was given a shared backstory with Melanie Pearson (Lucinda Cowden) and established friendships with Holly Hoyland (Lucinda Armstrong Hall) and Eden Shaw (Costa D'Angelo), which were explored in the flashback episodes. Davis has described Krista's characterisation as "very fun and eccentric and she loves life." During her first year in the series, writers transformed Krista from a party girl into a business woman, running the Lassiters hotel alongside Paul Robinson (Stefan Dennis). They originally are portrayed as enemies but Paul later assumes a "father figure" role towards Krista.

Krista is an alcoholic and drug addict and these traits often play into her storylines. Her early stories focused on her friendship with David Tanaka (Takaya Honda), who helps Krista get sober. Krista soon discovers she is pregnant with Eden's child and vows to remain sober. Writers also developed a relationship with Leo Tanaka (Tim Kano), which became more prominent during her second year in the series. Writers also developed a feud with Chelsea Murphy (Viva Bianca), which featured them competing in their roles at Lassiters. Their rivalry ends in turmoil when Chelsea locks Krista in a sauna room causing her to be hospitalised. Writers used Krista to explore the issue of stillbirth. Krista's baby dies following the sauna incident. Davis revealed that she researched stillbirth extensively and wanted to portray the story with sensitivity for the show's audience. She also revealed it was one of her favourite storylines to portray. Krista subsequently has a drugs relapse and struggles to cope with her grief.

The introduction of her best friend, Sebastian Metcalfe (Rarmian Newton) and her half-sister, Fallon Morell (Kate Connick) further explored her backstory. Krista feels responsible for introducing Sebastian to drugs and tries to help him to the detriment of her relationship with Leo. Fallon resents Krista for her privileged upbringing and teams up with Sebastian to ruin her relationship with Leo. Producers decided to make Krista and Leo's wedding storyline centric to the show's 40th anniversary. Fallon succeeds in manipulating and ruining Krista's relationship by claiming to have had sex with Leo. Krista responds by having sex with Sebastian and Fallon reveals her plotting. Krista and Leo marry but she later reveals her infidelity. Krista has been well received by television critics who praised Davis' performances. Davis has also been nominated for an Inside Soap Award for her portrayal of Krista.

== Casting ==
Before receiving the role of Krista, Davis auditioned for the roles of Chloe Brennan and Nicolette Stone but was unsuccessful. On 21 November 2023, Neighbours' social media accounts confirmed that Davis had joined the show's regular cast. Davis revealed on Instagram that she had been hired on a one-year contract. Krista is her first ongoing acting role, which she branded as her debut "official big gig". Davis revealed her gratitude to join the cast of a "wonderful company" and thanked her supporters. Davis made her first on-screen appearance as Krista during Episode 8936, which was broadcast on 13 November 2023. Davis was added to the show's opening titles from 27 November 2023.

== Development ==
=== Characterisation ===
Krista's characterisation was previewed in the Ramsay Street Revelations video series. Davis revealed that Krista is "a very outgoing person. She's very fun and eccentric and she loves life. She loves the party vibe." Krista has been ordered to fit her family mould by taking on her family's business and "go into the family line and she does not want to, so she has taken a little journey down to Ramsay Street to evade her family." Davis promised Krista would have "lots of ups and downs" in her storylines and teased a "great redemption" arc for the character. In 2024, Davis revealed that she was "obsessed" with Krista and her storylines, which made her "fun" to portray. Davis summarised that Krista developed quickly during her first year in the show. She noted the character had been hospitalised numerous times and took on the role of running Lassiters. She added "it's exciting to see Krista stepping into her feminine power." In March 2024, Davis revealed that she wanted Krista to have more "wins" because she really does "love seeing her thrive".

=== Introduction and flashback week ===
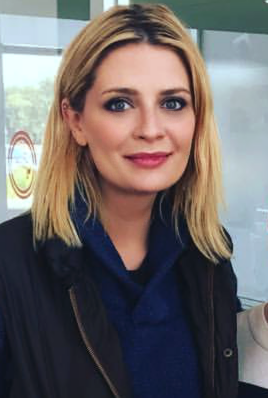
Mischa Barton plays Krista's half-sister, Reece Sinclair.

Prior to her debut, Krista was subject to a mystery storyline involving her half-sister of Reece Sinclair (Mischa Barton). Barton publicised that Reece's motive for being in Erinsborough is to track down her sister. Davis was unaware of the connection between her and Barton's characters until she noticed Krista and Reece's surnames were identical. It was later revealed that Krista is friends with the characters Holly Hoyland (Lucinda Armstrong Hall) and Eden Shaw (Costa D'Angelo). Their friendship is explored during a special week of episodes containing flashback scenes. These were designed to show viewers stories that had occurred whilst Neighbours had ceased broadcasting. Armstrong Hall told Sarah Ellis from Inside Soap that Krista meets Holly and Eden, who are in a relationship in Erinsborough. They become friends and go on a road trip together because they "just wanted to escape, go have fun and be young together." Krista and Holly develop a close friendship and spend a year together. Krista also becomes close to Eden and they have sex. Armstrong Hall revealed that their betrayal is "really heart-breaking". On 12 November 2023, Amazon Freevee released a trailer promoting Reece's search for Krista. In the video Reece discovers a photograph of Krista, Holly and Eden, confirming their friendship.

During the first episode of flashback week, writers established Krista with further connections to their characters, with the reveal that Krista is an old acquaintance of Melanie Pearson (Lucinda Cowden). One flashback scene reveals that Melanie meets with Krista on her wedding day to Toadie Rebecchi (Ryan Moloney), which originally occurred in the episodic timeline of Neighbours: The Finale. Further scenes reveal to viewers that Melanie worked as a housekeeper for Krista's family in England. Melanie had tried to protect Krista after she became embroiled in a drug deal. Melanie reveals she was captured on CCTV at the deal and fled to Australia to evade the police. In another flashback, Krista blackmails Melanie for money and threatens to otherwise tell Toadie about their criminal past. Cowden recalled her shock when she learned about the storyline. She added desperately wanted Melanie to tell Toadie the truth as soon as Krista arrived. In another flashback week episode it is revealed that Krista and Eden continue to blackmail Melanie. This leads to a confrontation between Krista and Melanie with the latter pushing Krista, who hits her head. Melanie believes that she has killed Krista and Paul Robinson (Stefan Dennis) helps cover up her death. This causes Melanie to leave Toadie and flee Erinsborough. The stunt was filmed on the set of the Lassiter's hotel rooftop, which has a swimming pool and into which Krista falls after hitting her head. When they filmed the scene outside it was raining. Sequences were filmed showing Cowden pushing Davis into the swimming pool. Davis had a stunt coordinator, a safety supervisor and a stunt double on-set to help film the scenes. There was also a nurse present in case Davis was injured while performing the stunt.

In a plot twist, Krista is later revealed to be alive and living with Eden. Holly and Haz Devkar (Shiv Palekar) find Krista in a basement and where she lay ill because of her drug addiction. After which she is introduced into the show's then, current storylines. Krista is diagnosed with pneumonia and upon being discharged she tries to wean herself off drugs with the support of David Tanaka (Takaya Honda). He eventually convinces her enter rehab to treat her drug and alcohol addiction. She decides to check herself out after one week and half which causes David concern. He worries that Krista will be unable to cope with the death of her father, Conrad Sinclair. When David carries out a welfare check on Krista, he is shocked that she appears to be dealing with her sobriety well. Honda enjoyed working on the story with Davis. He told Chloe Timms from Inside Soap that his favourite scene from the show's Amazon era was David and Krista sitting in a car, where they "connect" and become friends. David supports Krista when she thinks about taking drugs again. Honda explained that "it was the first real moment the two characters had and there was a really nice dynamic between me and Majella."

Krista soon discovers she is pregnant with Eden's child. Krista and her boyfriend Leo Tanaka (Tim Kano), David and his husband, Aaron Brennan (Matt Wilson) go on holiday together. Eden follows them and confronts Krista about keeping her pregnancy from him. Leo tries to protect Krista and a fight ensues between him and Eden. David intervenes and he and Eden fall off a cliff. Davis told Daniel Kilkelly and Sophie Dainty from Digital Spy that "Krista is terrified" and seeing Eden again is a "massive shock and just overwhelming". She had believed Eden was in prison and believed everything was fine temporarily. Davis revealed that Eden knowing about her pregnancy is "so terrifying" for Krista. Davis told a TV Week reporter that Krista is caught "completely off guard" by Eden because she is "wrapped up in her love bubble with Leo." She explained that Krista is not a "damsel" type of character but is glad Leo, Aaron and David are their to support her. She also believed Krista "feels a sense of guilt" for having implicated them "into her mess" with Eden. The scenes were filmed on location in a mountainous area in mid-2023. It was Davis' first experience with location filming and she revealed that it was cold because of winter time filming. Davis recalled the experience as being "really cool". Writers killed David off as a result of the stunt. Davis later named David's death one of her favourite storylines because it was "such a pivotal moment in the show and for Krista's character."

=== Feud with Chelsea Murphy ===
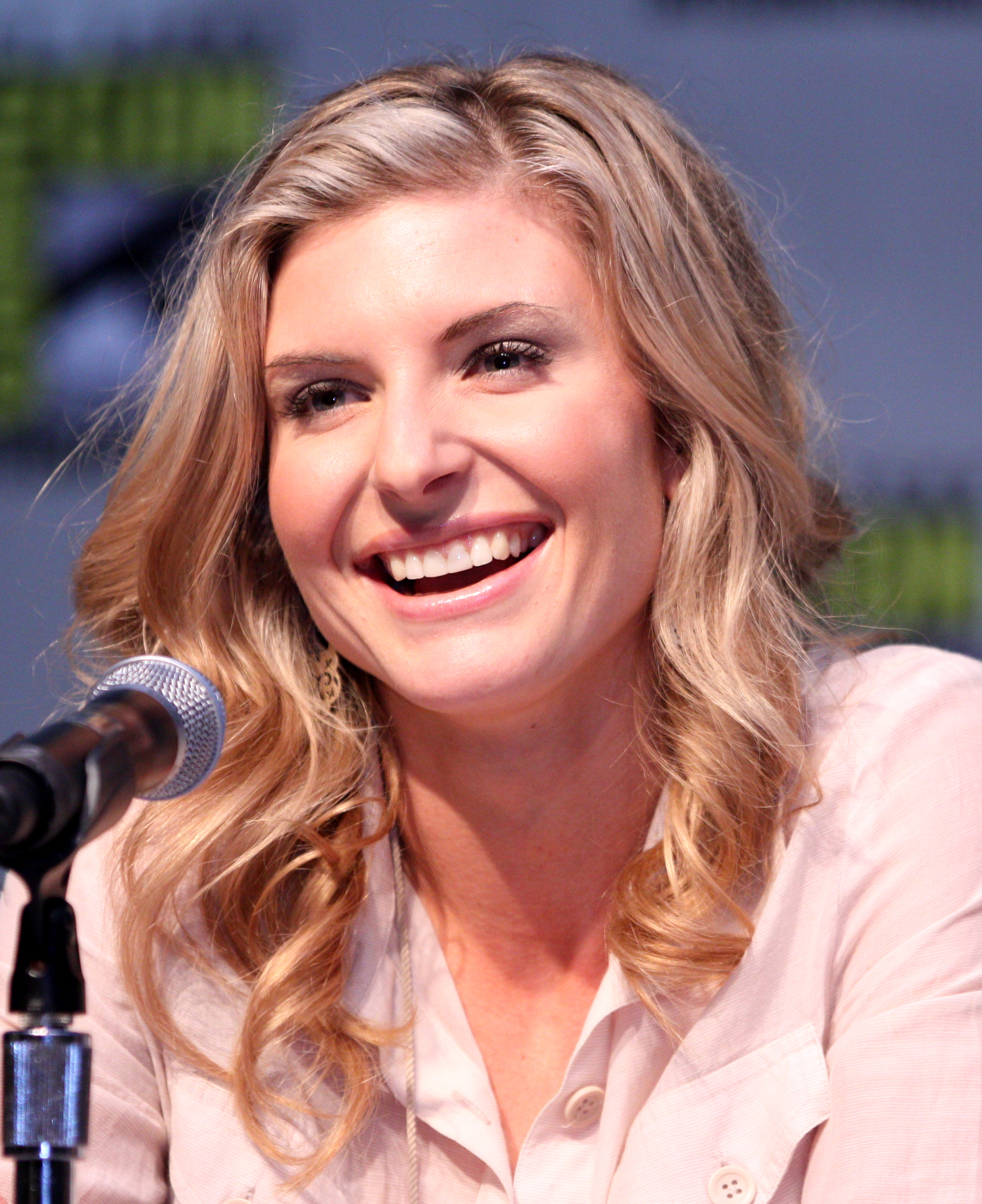
Viva Bianca plays Chelsea Murphy, who feuds with Krista at Lassiters.

Writers developed a feud between Krista and Chelsea Murphy (Viva Bianca). Krista becomes annoyed with Chelsea's presence at the hotel and believes she is trying to take over. Krista's prominence at Lassiters grows following her successful "longest lie in" promotional event, which she stages as a tribute to David. Her efforts impress Paul, who praises Krista. He also hopes that acknowledging Krista's skills will help make amends with Leo after they become estranged. Chelsea becomes annoyed that Paul begins to favour Krista at the hotel. Chelsea's wrath is unleashed when Paul's sister, Lucy Robinson (Melissa Bell) chooses Krista to present an important business meeting for Lassiters. A Neighbours publicist explained that "Chelsea sees red" and "goes to great lengths" to take over the presentation. Krista continues to be undermined at work as Chelsea continues managing the hotel. Paul's continued praise of Krista makes Chelsea jealous. These events force her to take drastic action, which endangers the lives of Krista and her unborn baby. Bianca explained to Inside Soap's Ellis that "Chelsea is threatened by Krista's power." She noted Chelsea's aim is "shine at Lassiters" and be a strong partner for Paul, but Krista's presence becomes an issue in her achieving this. Bianca concluded that Chelsea is "envious" of Krista who "already possesses what Chelsea so desperately wants."

Chelsea locks Krista in a sauna so she can take her place in a work presentation, leading Krista to collapse and lose her unborn baby. A "strange" new dynamic was written for the characters as they hide each other's secrets, Bianca described that "they become strangely co-dependent" and "they hold the key to one another's Achilles heel." Bianca believed that despite Chelsea's behaviour towards Krista, she is "riddled with guilt" that she inadvertently caused her miscarriage. Bianca likened Chelsea's lies over Krista to a game of dominos that becomes uncontrollable and she becomes "terrified" the truth about Krista's predicament will be revealed. Bianca added that in the aftermath of her stillbirth, "Krista has her own demons to wrestle with." Writers only heightened the feud with Chelsea manipulating Krista's grief and causing her to relapse with drugs. Inside Soap's Ellis reported that Krista would be unaware that Chelsea purposely caused her drugs relapse. A Neighbours publicist told Ellis that Krista falls "off the wagon big time" and Aaron begins to enable her behaviour. Aaron struggles with his grief over David's death and he becomes a drinking partner for Krista. He later discovers Krista has drugs and he feels ashamed. Aaron feels that he has betrayed David by enabling Krista after he helped her get sober. They added "he's full of guilt and shame for allowing Krista to go down this rabbit hole again." Bianca worried that her Chelsea's schemes were out of control and wanted redemption for her character.

The plot continues with Paul hiring an IT technician, Jeffrey Swan (Tim Potter) to conduct a report on the events in the sauna. Jeffrey's report directly implicates Chelsea in the incident. Chelsea becomes determined to convince Jeffrey to doctor his report and seduces in exchange for his silence. Jeffrey then pursues Chelsea romantically behind Paul's back. Following Chelsea's engagement to Paul, a Neighbours publicist told Timms from Inside Soap that Chelsea feels accomplished and is relishing achieving her goals. They warned that Krista, who "knows every horrifying thing Chelsea has done" could be the one to expose her nemesis, adding "Chelsea's house of card is set to fall." Daniel Kilkelly from Digital Spy reported that Chelsea and Paul's engagement party would be ruined by Jeffrey and Krista, after the latter realises "her rival's terrible secret".

=== Stillbirth ===
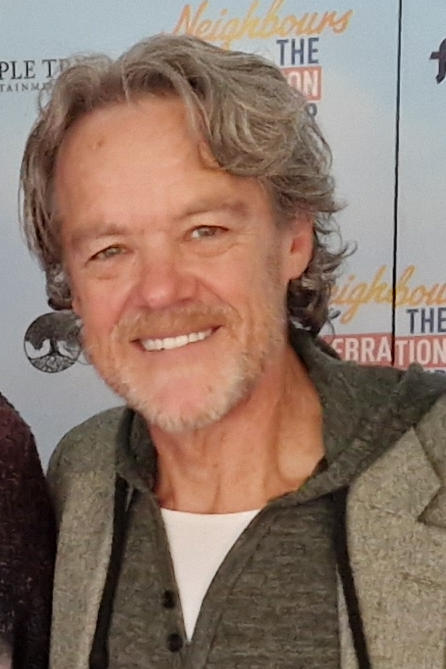
Stefan Dennis plays Krista's enemy Paul Robinson, who assumes a father figure role for Krista following the stillbirth storyline.

Writers explored an issue based storyline about stillbirth via the character. Krista's baby dies following her being locked in a sauna room by Chelsea. Davis researched the issue thoroughly to prepare for her portrayal. Producers informed Davis about the storyline in advance which allowed her to process how Krista may feel during the traumatic scenes writers had developed for her. Davis listened to women's experiences of stillbirth to help this process. She told George Lewis from Digital Spy that "I started by doing lots of research and listening to a lot of different experiences from mothers who had lost a child through pregnancy." Davis revealed that she was well supported by those present on set during filming, adding "I really felt safe to lean in and feel the depth of grief Krista would be feeling."

Paul becomes an unlikely source of support during the stillbirth scenes and Krista's grief process. Davis believed that writers had been successful in pairing Krista and Paul in the scenes. She described his presence as "something really beautiful" because Krista's dad had died and Paul becomes a farther figure to her. She added that "the relationship she has with Paul kind of mirrors the relationship" she shared with Conrad and "it honestly just fit so perfectly that he was there for her." Krista's relationship with Paul had been fraught as writers previously explored "power dynamics" when the characters clash. Davis described their new scenes as "sweet stuff" and "really heart-warming". Davis hoped that writers continued the dynamic of the "two extremes". Krista names her baby Hope and subsequent episodes feature a memorial service, which her friends attend. Paul decides to host the service, which further strengthens their newfound friendship. His nice behaviour towards Krista also reconciles his relationship with Leo. He also vows to find who caused Krista's miscarriage and remains unaware about Chelsea's involvement. Davis later assessed that Paul and Krista eventually form a "beautiful father-daughter type relationship between them."

Davis told a TV Week reporter that "it's impossible to describe the loss of a child, and Krista is trying to do everything right by her daughter and give her the farewell she deserves, she wants Hope's memorial to be perfect." She added that it "means everything" to Krista to have Paul, Leo and "her new community of friends" supporting her. The storyline also explored the effects her grief has on her sobriety. Davis explained that "fear of failure as a mother is triggering for Krista" and "the urge to numb herself with drugs and alcohol is a learned response." Krista finds it difficult to cope with Hope's death without drugs. Davis believed a relapse during her grief could be "catastrophic for Krista" because she had worked hard to change her life and overcome addiction. Krista also worries about Eden's reaction to his child dying, David noted that Krista is still "terrified" of what he might do next. Krista knows that Eden believed he could still exert control over Krista via her pregnancy and access her wealth, but Hope's death takes this away from him. She added that Krista fears his reaction because "she knows what he’s capable of." Davis later revealed that the stillbirth is her favourite storyline Krista had been featured in. She also named it as "a big moment" in her career, adding it was "some of my favourite stuff to act and represent on screen." She told Ellis from Inside Soap that she wanted to tell the story "authentically and make sure it resonated with people in a respectful way." Davis stated she received feedback from viewers "about how touched they were by the story."

=== Relationship with Leo Tanaka ===
Writers developed Krista's main relationship storyline with Leo Tanaka. Davis enjoyed working with Kano on the story, adding "he is a darling, we always have a lot of fun on set." Davis believed that Krista and Leo "are just so perfect for each other" and "everyone" hopes for a man like Leo. She viewed their backstories as being similar because they both partied a lot in their past storylines. She added both "are now coming into their own and it's just a very mature and respectful relationship." Davis told Michael Darling from Whattowatch.com that Krista and Leo share "a deep deep love and respect" for each other and have an "incredible relationship that they have built". Their early storylines included dealing with Eden's return and a break-up following her drugs relapse. Leo's daughter, Abigail Tanaka (Nikita Kato) accidentally takes drugs believing they are sweets. She is taken to hospital for treatment but realises they were opioids that her dealer, Shannon Rutherford (Grace Quealy) attempted to sell her. Writers later reunited the couple following the incident.

The introduction of Sebastian Metcalfe (Rarmian Newton) and Fallon Morell (Kate Connick) expanded Krista's fictional universe and explored her backstory. Sebastian was described as being a "a face from Krista's past" and created to play a "big part" in Krista's storyline. A publicist added "his presence is set to send shockwaves through Erinsborough for a long time to come..." Krista and Sebastian are best friends and have a shared history of drug addiction. The show's executive producer, Jason Herbison told Johnathon Hughes from Radio Times that Krista first introduced Sebastian to drugs and "feels responsible for the path Seb has taken." He described Krista as being "on an eternal mission to get him back on the straight and narrow", which subsequently causes conflict in her relationship with Leo. Of Fallon's role it was warned that she "spells trouble for many an Erinsborough resident... particularly her sister." Herbison revealed that Fallon is Krista's sister and Neighbours would examine their difficult sibling relationship. He described Krista's family tree as "complicated" because it was "spanning many countries". Fallon is Krista's maternal half-sister and Herbison revealed that her not being Sinclair meant they had different upbringings because she did not experience Krista's financial privilege.

Writers also planned a wedding story for the duo. Davis previously envisioned Krista and Leo having a big budget wedding because of their shared wealth. She added "you've basically got a millionaire and a billionaire together, so it would definitely be something to write home about!" Herbison stated that Krista and Leo are in love but need to work out their issues. He added that the show were working towards the couple's wedding storyline but was cryptic about whether they would successfully marry or not. Sebastian declares his love for Krista and kisses her, which is witnessed by Fallon, who is also revealed to the audience as Sebastian's ex-girlfriend. Krista responds by friend-zoning Sebastian and confirming her commitment to Leo. Fallon begins to scheme against Krista and attempts to ruin her relationship with Leo. Krista confides in Fallon that Sebastian kissed her and she kept it a secret from Leo. She is unaware that Fallon is already aware of this. Fallon engineers a situation in which makes it appear she has accidentally told Leo about the kiss. A Neighbours publicist told Inside Soap's Ellis that "all hell breaks loose once Leo discovers he's been lied to." Leo asks Krista to give him a letter Sebastian wrote to her in order to regain his trust. They added that Krista refuses and Leo questions whether they are rushing into a marriage. Connick told Lucy Croke from TV Week that Fallon originally believes Leo "deserves to know" the truth because it is "only fair". Fallon is "heartbroken" that Leo still remains committed to Krista. Connick added that "at this point, Fallon understands her wrongdoings and tries to make it right with Krista, but she is unsure if it's too late."

In the build up to their wedding, writers ramped up Fallon's manipulation of the couple. She ensures Leo reads a confidential letter addressed to Krista from Sebastian. His betrayal upsets Krista and they argue. Fallon is delighted her plan seems to be working and enlists Sebastian's help to split Krista and Leo up. A publicist told Ellis that Aaron begins to suspect Fallon is scheming against Krista. Aaron tells Krista his suspicions, with them adding that "a seed of doubt is planted in Krista's mind." It was later revealed that Krista and Leo's wedding would form the main storyline during the show's 40th anniversary week. In 2024, Davis and Kano had an hour-long story meeting with Herbison, where he discussed their planned their role in the 40th anniversary. Davis was shocked that their characters would be centric to the anniversary. Davis revealed to Daniel Kilkelly and Erin Zammitt from Digital Spy that "I was on the floor – I almost passed out!" Kano added that it was only after the meeting they fully processed the enormity of their role in the anniversary. Kano likened the build up to the wedding episode to a roller-coaster. He believed that there are "lots of mixed messages" and "a lot of people meddling with their relationship and trying to derail it." Sebastian returns and visits Krista, but this sends Leo into a violent rage and he attacks Sebastian. Kano told a TV Week reporter that Leo is "at his wit's end" and "pushed to the edge" by Sebastian's return. He explained that "all his worry about the toxic relationship between Krista and Sebastian comes to a head when hesees them together." Kano also believed that Leo feels hurt that Krista is not prioritising their relationship over Sebastian. He also confirmed that Leo is "clueless" about Fallon's "ulterior motives and manipulations". He believes that she is being genuine and wants to support Fallon because of her significance to Krista.

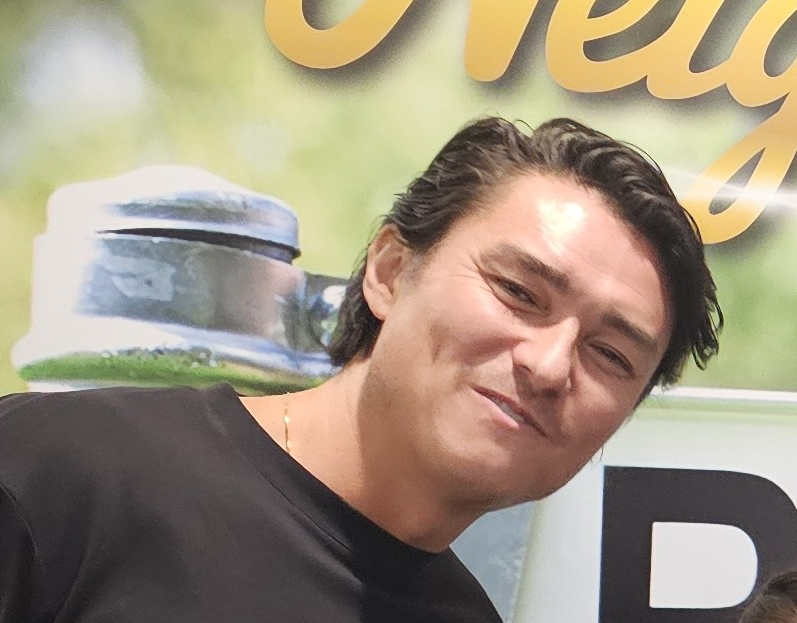
Tim Kano plays Krista's husband, Leo Tanaka.

Krista has sex with Sebastian. Davis was shocked because she assumed it would be Leo who would cheat. She recalled that Herbison informed them about the infidelity which leaves their wedding in jeopardy. Her betrayal occurs after being manipulated by Fallon and Sebastian into believing that Leo has had sex with Fallon. Davis believed that their scheming made Krista's actions being justifiable but viewed Krista as behaving in a "reckless" manner. She explained that Krista wants to feel desired after Leo's supposed betrayal, explaining that "it was justifiable in my head, but also pretty heartbreaking." Fallon and Sebastian divulge all their secrets to Krista and Davis noted that once Krista realises Fallon lied, "it's like the world is spinning around her." Their admission that they used to be in a relationship shocks Krista more and Davis likened the continued shocks in the narrative to a series of bombs being detonated. Davis concluded that Krista's realisation of Leo being innocent is "just awful". Davis told Inside Soap's Timms that Krista fails to recognise that Fallon and Sebastian are emotionally hurt in the story too. She explained that "it's the classic irony of wires being crossed. Krista wants to see the best in her sister", but cannot understand they are hurting. Fallon feels guilty and tries to convince Sebastian to leave Krista alone. Paul urges Krista to remove Sebastian from her life and marry Leo.

At the wedding ceremony, it appears that Krista will not turn up. She arrives late and Paul walks Krista down the aisle, at the same time Sebastian arrives at the ceremony intent on trouble making. The duo marry in front of their friends, Kano told Timms that the experience and arriving on set was "amazing". Davis added that it was "special" and hoped the wedding would as iconic and memorable as Scott and Charlene Robinson's wedding from 1987. Krista's wedding dress was designed by Nick Wakeley and inspired by a Lady Gaga attire. The dress was tailor-made, took thirty minutes to put on and Davis had to dehydrate prior to filming in it so she did not need to remove it. Leo later discovers Krista has betrayed him. Kano doubted Leo could forgive Krista's infidelity because he had been always been so suspicious that it being confirmed is "the ultimate betrayal". He added that despite his reservations, Krista cheating was "juicy adult drama". Both Davis and Kano remained committed to their belief that Krista and Leo were well matched. Davis reaffirmed the two characters are "so similar" background wise and Kano added they are "a match made in heaven."

== Reception ==
For her role as Krista, Davis received a longlist nomination for the "Best Daytime Star" accolade at the 2024 Inside Soap Awards. Digital Spy's Sara Baalla described Krista's stillbirth as a "tragic baby loss" storyline. Her colleague Joe Anderton described the plot as a "tragedy" and Chelsea's actions "devastatingly led to Krista losing her baby." Inside Soap's Ellis noted how Krista had begun to "win over viewers" with her stories. Ellis added "anyone who can put Paul in his place gets out vote!" Pip Ellwood-Hughes from Entertainment Focus praised the character, stating that she "has been a real bonus for the show." Ellwood-Hughes also branded Krista a "smart cookie" type character. They also praised her tenacity adding "she's proven time and time again that she's a tough cookie." Lucy Croke from Now to Love assessed that Krista has a "complicated love life".

Connor McMullan from Digital Spy critiqued Krista and Leo's roles in the shows 40th anniversary. He believed that writers were wise to focus the week's plot on their nuptials because "there's no better celebration than a wedding to bring characters together." He described the location scenes the wedding as "stunning". Of their romance, McMullan opined "we can't say the pairing will go down in soap history as an iconic golden couple, so perhaps wisely Neighbours veered away from presenting it as an epic romance." He believed the addition of Krista having sex with Sebastian added "much-needed jeopardy" to their storyline because it had not " exactly set the screen alight recently." His colleague Kilkelly branded Krista and Leo as a "glamorous couple" and assessed that their wedding was a selection of "nail-biting" scenes. A writer from Maxim praised Davis stating that Krista was a "breakout moment" and helped "revive the soap for a whole new audience"; they also predicted that Davis would become the next Australian soap star to try to work in Hollywood.
