= Nicolette Stone =

Fictional character from Neighbours

- Neighbours character
- Hannah Monson as Nicolette
- Portrayed by: Charlotte Chimes (2020–2022); Hannah Monson (2023–2025)
- Duration: 2020–2025
- First appearance: 15 July 2020
- Last appearance: 11 December 2025
- Introduced by: Jason Herbison
- Charlotte Chimes as Nicolette
In-universe information
- Occupation: Nurse; Waitress; Harold's Café manager; Co-owner of Yorokobi
- Father: Victor Stone
- Mother: Jane Harris
- Brothers: Byron Stone
- Daughters: Isla Tanaka-Brennan
- Grandmothers: Amanda Harris
- Other relatives: Nell Mangel; Len Mangel; Joe Mangel; Sky Mangel; Toby Mangel

Nicolette Stone is a fictional character from the Australian television soap opera Neighbours, played by Charlotte Chimes and Hannah Monson. She made her first appearance during the episode broadcast on 15 July 2020. Chimes auditioned for the role at a time she felt creatively fulfilled owing to her work on another series. Despite her nonchalant approach, Chimes was invited to a second audition, which the then Sydney based actress had to perform over video-tape due to the COVID-19 pandemic travel restrictions imposed in Australia. Nicolette is the daughter of Jane Harris (Annie Jones), who returned to the series in a regular capacity alongside Nicolette's introduction. Nicolette was portrayed as "straight talking" and "brash", unafraid to hurt other character's feelings. Nicolette is a lesbian and is confident with being open about her sexuality. Writers created a fractured backstory between Nicolette and Jane, owing to Jane's request that Nicolette conceal her sexuality from her opinionated grandmother.

Nicolette quickly formed a friendship with Chloe Brennan (April Rose Pengilly), who she develops romantic feelings for despite her marriage to Pierce Greyson (Tim Robards) She later moves in with Chloe's brother Aaron Brennan (Matt Wilson) and his husband David Tanaka (Takaya Honda), leading to Neighbours' first surrogacy storyline involving three gay characters. Chimes believed the story created the ideal opportunity for Nicolette to create the family she had longed for. Nicolette was then central to a baby swap storyline, after she absconded while pregnant and sold another baby to Paul Robinson (Stefan Dennis). Nicolette featured until the show's finale episode in 2022; when the series returned the following year, Monson took over the role, and the character remained until the series concluded again in December 2025. While played by Monson, Nicolette's storylines saw her struggle to co-parent her daughter, Isla Tanaka-Brennan (Hana Abe-Tucker), with Aaron after David is killed, and later embark on a relationship with the villainous Yasmine Shields (Chrishell Stause). Nicolette's manipulative behaviour has garnered her a reputation with television critics as being a "troublemaker" and "villain". Critics praised Nicolette's characterisation as portrayed by Chimes, and the development writers had managed to achieve in just two years on-screen. Monson's portrayal has also been well received.

== Casting ==
When Chimes auditioned for the role of Nicolette, she felt "blasé about it" because she felt "creatively fulfilled" producing work for the Build Series Sydney. Chimes did not want to pitch her entire career hopes on a single audition but later reflected that her career satisfaction played a large part in securing the role. She recalled "it was like oh I think I'm gonna get this, it happened very easily, so easily really, oh I guess that's the key." Chimes was invited to perform a second audition for the role. As Chimes was located in Sydney during the COVID-19 pandemic, she was unable to travel to Melbourne for the call back auditions. Chimes filmed a video audition in her mother's kitchen. Her mother also read other characters lines and Chimes described it as a surreal experience as they pretended to flirt and proceed to argue.

Securing the role made Chimes confident about beginning filming until two days prior. Chimes explained that "imposter syndrome" affected her and she was unsure if she could portray the character. A conversation with her acting coach, who like Nicolette is gay, helped her better prepare. Chimes explained that it was important to portray LGBTQ characters with authenticity and bring a truth to Nicolette. Chimes was eager to play Nicolette on her first day on-set and recalled stating "finally I'm here, now lets get to work".

The character and Chimes' casting were announced on 27 June 2020. Producers signed Chimes to a three-year contract. Nicolette is Chimes' first ongoing role after previously acting in two mini-series projects. Chimes reflected that she felt "immense gratitude" to be cast in an "iconic" series and secure long-term work during the COVID-19 pandemic. Nicolette is introduced into Neighbours as the estranged daughter of Jane Harris (Annie Jones). Her debut coincides with the permanent reintroduction of Jane, who was once a regular character and had been appearing on a recurring basis for two years. Writers created a backstory for her, which details a fractured relationship with Jane ever since Nicolette decided to come out as lesbian. Discussing the announcement, Jones stated "audiences will learn more about her family, as fans are introduced to her daughter Nicolette for the first time." Chimes made her first appearance as Nicolette during the episode broadcast on 15 July 2020. Actress Majella Davis, who went on to play Krista Sinclair, revealed that she also auditioned for the role.

== Development ==
=== Characterisation ===
Nicolette's character profile on the show's official website states that she is "deeply practical and fantastic in a crisis" and adores being active because she "has an adventurous streak a mile wide". Nicolette chose nursing as a career because she it would "provide plenty of variety and excitement". It also branded her a "straight talker" who "never holds back when something important is on the line." Nicolette also struggles to interpret with her own feelings and "can sometimes be oblivious when her straight talking has hurt feelings." Chimes' first scene was filmed with Rebekah Elmaloglou who plays Terese Willis. The scene depicts Nicolette meeting with Terese and Nicolette reveals that she has a difficult relationship with Jane. Nicolette also announces that she is a lesbian. Chimes described Nicolette as making a statement of "this is who I am, this is what's going on, I have nothing to hide anymore."

In her first interview with Inside Soap, Chimes described Nicolette as an optimistic character with "cheerful, adventurous and fun" personality traits. Though she believed that Nicolette was not well adapted to dealing with her emotions. Nicolette is often portrayed as "brash", she talks in literal terms and "calls a spade a spade." Chimes was pleased that writers portrayed Nicolette being confident and open about her sexuality. Nicolette is portrayed as a villainous character but writers often showcased her vulnerable side. Chimes "loved" playing Nicolette as a villain and found her going "head-to-head" more exciting. She also enjoyed Nicolette the most when "she's being naughty". Chimes was protective of Nicolette, despite her villainy. She told Daniel Kilkelly from Digital Spy that "sometimes when she's remorseful, I get very protective of her and I think: 'Well, she's not entirely wrong and why is she always the one apologising?'" When Chimes filmed the character's more mundane scenes, directors allowed her to amp-up the comedy in Nicolette's scenes. Chimes told Kilkelly that "I thought of some weird, quirky things I could do to bring the scenes to life in the most Nicolette way possible." Chimes was fond of the contents of Nicolette's wardrobe and described her as having "exceptional style".

Chimes told Stephen Patterson of Metro that she sometimes found it both difficult and fun to play Nicolette. Chimes never shied away from expressing Nicolette's "human-ness in her" and her "ugly" characteristics. Chimes assessed that Nicolette had many "Cha Cha's", which she explained were stories in which Nicolette's actions would see her progress "two steps forward and one step back." Nicolette is often involved in animosity with other characters, especially Paul Robinson (Stefan Dennis), Pierce Greyson (Tim Robards) and her mother Jane. Chimes concluded that collectively this was Nicolette as "not her best self" but was her "favourite" content to portray.

In a later story, Nicolette questions if she and established villain Paul are alike as they concoct schemes together. Chimes believed that this signified that Nicolette still had the same characterisation but she "had softened as a person". Nicolette becoming a parent also affected her personality. Chimes believed Nicolette never stopped being "a fiery firecracker" but motherhood grounded her and made her "very conscious" about parenting as she settled into her first "stable home environment".

=== Mother-daughter conflict ===
Chimes was thrilled to play the daughter of Jane, one of the show's legacy characters. Chimes felt it was more "rewarding" because of the rich backstory Jane provided Nicolette within the series. One of Nicolette's main story arcs created from this backstory is her fractured relationship with Jane. Chimes told Sarah Ellis of Inside Soap that Nicolette and Jane's problems arose from when Nicolette came out as lesbian whilst they lived at her grandmother's house. Jane did not want Nell to know about Nicolette's sexuality which left her feeling unaccepted by Jane. Chimes believed that neither character was able to communicate their wanting of a better family relationship and the issue is "swept under the carpet" and festers.

Jones thought that Nicolette and Jane's problems stemmed from them being "polar opposites". Jones added that "I think Jane wishes she would be more like her, which of course she isn't." Jane is hopeful they can solve their differences about what happened when Nicolette came out, but the latter is not as keen. Jones reasoned it was difficult because Nicolette moved to Australia and trained to become a nurse, while Jane remained in the UK to care for Nell. This time and distance only served to add to their rift. Jones concluded that the entire issue leaves Jane feeling "like a complete failure again" and finds it "very hard" to deal with.

Writers continued to play on their fractured relationship during Nicolette's stories. When Nicolette decides to become a surrogate mother, Jane disapproves and expresses her concerns Nicolette is being hasty. Chimes believed that having a baby would be "healing" for Nicolette because of her own upbringing. She branded Nicolette and Janes relationship "tumultuous" and wants the child "to be fully expressed" because Jane did not allow Nicolette to express her sexuality when she was young. Despite Jane's disapproval, Chimes noted Jane's behaviour is because she "deeply loves and cares" for daughter. Chimes believed that her and Jones' good dynamic and workplace happiness was vital in portraying Nicolette and Jane's relationship. She described their artistic approach in which they strived to produce scenes that were superlative. If a scene required Nicolette to be arguing with Jane they spared no effort in shouting, "Come on! Come at me!"

=== Chloe Brennan ===
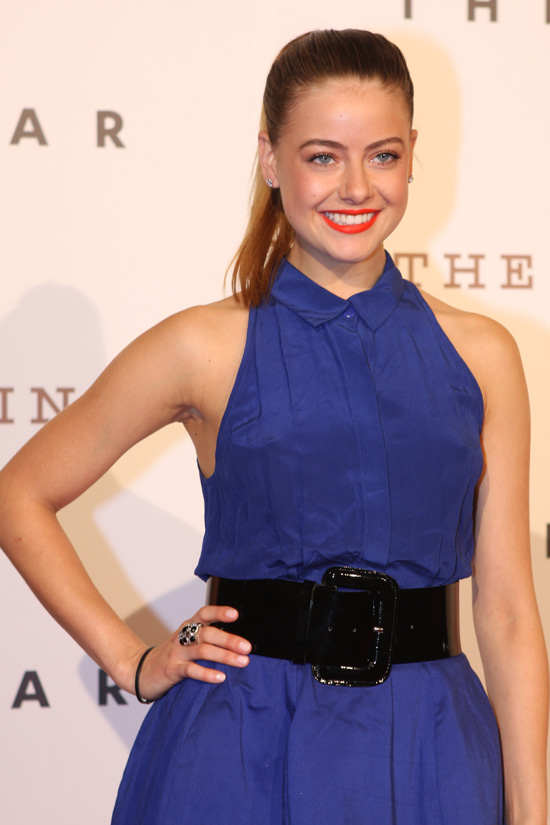
Nicolette's first love interest Chloe Brennan, played by April Rose Pengilly.

One of the character's early stories was her unrequited love for her friend, Chloe Brennan (April Rose Pengilly). Chimes believed that Nicolette and Chloe have a "natural chemistry" from their first meeting and "were meant to be in each others lives." Chimes later told television director Lee Salisbury that Nicolette is in love with Chloe and "has pined after her basically since the moment they met." She thought it was unlike Nicolette to ask to date someone because she had grown accustomed to women chasing her. Nicolette begins to care for Chloe's terminally ill mother, Fay Brennan (Zoe Bertram). Nicolette and Pierce soon begin to feud with each other. Nicolette decides to hide her feelings for Chloe but grows annoyed with Pierce's treatment of Chloe. Chimes told Amy Hadley from TV Week that Nicolette hates "how possessive and controlling" Pierce is towards Chloe and it was ironic because Nicolette offers him good advice. She decides to prank Pierce while he visits a day spa, which only worsens their feud. A Neighbours publicist assessed that Pierce's dislike of Nicolette occurs when he discovers she is gay. He feels insecure about and convinced Nicolette wants Chloe to herself. Pierce's son, Hendrix Greyson (Ben Turland) discovers Nicolette's feelings for Chloe and threatens to tell his father. Robards told Ellis that Pierce is already insecure about Chloe's sexuality because he feels like he cannot compete with women. He added that he would feel more "threatened" by Nicolette if he knew her true intentions.

Nicolette discovers Pierce is having an affair with Dipi Rebecchi (Sharon Johal) and the story takes a dramatic turn as plots to expose their infidelity. Nicolette realises that Pierce is being unfaithful when she learns he kissed someone in fancy dress. Nicolette works out that Dipi was wearing the matching costume. Chimes told Hadley that her character goes into "stealthy snooping" mode and uses a diamond necklace to expose their affair. Chimes explained that Nicolette is "devastated" for Chloe but never thought Pierce was suitable for her and she feels "proven right". She added that Nicolette feels obliged to expose Pierce even if it will "crush" Chloe. Ultimately, Nicolette believes with her help, "Chloe can start her life afresh and work out what she really wants."

In a later interview with Salisbury, Chimes stated that Nicolette was stuck in a predicament, was "screwed" and would be blamed either way so concocted the scheme to expose the affair. Chimes believed that Nicolette could have told the truth sooner, but she was happy that the scripts initially made it appear that Nicolette gets away with her scheming. Despite this, Chimes warned secrets are eventually exposed in Neighbours storylines. After Pierce's infidelity is exposed, Nicolette and Chloe remain good friends. Chimes did not believe that the pair should begin a romance because Nicolette made the scenario more complicated by deceiving Chloe. At the point in the story, Nicolette is also on good terms with Jane. Chimes assessed that her character is content being Chloe's friend because "she's in a really good place and she doesn't want to jeopardise that in any way."

Chloe ends her friendship with Nicolette once she discovers her involvement. When Fay becomes more frail, she requests that Nicolette helps care for her again. Chloe struggles with having Nicolette around again but respects her mother's wishes. Pengilly told Laura Masia from TV Week that "Chloe feels very conflicted about having Nicolette back in her life, she's still upset with Nic." She added that she knows Nicolette is a good carer to Fay and agrees to the arrangement. Fay then decides she wants to update her will, to include Nicolette, but keeps this a secret from her. Fay asks Nicolette to keep her meeting with her lawyer, Toadie Rebecchi (Ryan Moloney) a secret. Toadie then wrongly assumes Nicolette has coerced Fay into changing her will and accuses her of fraud. Fay also wants Nicolette and Chloe to reconcile and begin a relationship. Bertram told Ellis (Inside Soap) that Fay mistakes the tension between Nicolette and Chloe for attraction and "likes the idea" of them together because it would complete the family unit with Chloe's brother Aaron. Nicolette confesses her guilt about the many lies she told previously, but Fay is forgives her. Bertram explained that Fay "has a real soft spot for Nicolette" and decides it would be hypocritical to judge her. She sees Nicolette's honesty as chance for her children to build a future with Nicolette. Fay also feels her unborn grandchild kick before she dies. After Fay's death, Chloe struggles with her grief and propositions Nicolette who respectfully rebuffs her advances. Pengilly opined that Chloe feels "mortified" and "foolish and embarrassed". Chloe still "cares" about Nicolette and feels as though she "turns her down when she needs her most."

Nicolette later begins a relationship with Chloe and Pengilly told Ellis that Nicolette worries Chloe is still grieving for Fay. She opined that Chloe observed how "wonderful" Nicolette was caring for Fay and this makes Chloe determined for them to be together. Pengilly added that Nicolette still has "genuine feelings" for Chloe. Their new relationship is also complicated because she was the surrogate mother to Chloe's brother Aaron Brennan (Matt Wilson) and his husband David Tanaka's (Takaya Honda) unborn child. When David's brother Leo Tanaka (Tim Kano) returns to Erinsborough, he is wary of Nicolette. He used to date Chloe but Nicolette decides put aside her worries and not jeopardise her new relationship. Chimes told Masia that Nicolette makes a promise "not to be the jealous partner anymore" and want to acquainted with Leo. Unbeknownst to her, Leo does not share her enthusiasm and begins to bond with Chloe as they work together. Kano explained that Leo thinks Nicolette is a "dodgy character" and wants to protect David and Chloe from her dramas. Kano added his belief that Leo ends up wanting Chloe for himself as their bond grows and plots against Nicolette. Kano told Ellis that Leo, Paul and Pierce form a "secret alliance" working against Nicolette to protect their family interests. He described "red flag" warnings that Nicolette will hurt David and Aaron, especially when she refers to her unborn child as belonging to her and Chloe. Inside Soap's Alice Penwill reported that Hendrix would discover Leo's plans and attempt to stop him. Hendrix takes Nicolette to Leo's vineyard to stop him snaring Chloe. A Neighbours publicist told Penwill that Hendrix "ups the ante" in his efforts to rumble Leo. He arranges a romantic picnic for Chloe and Nicolette, but she wanders off alone and has an accident, possibly harming her unborn child.

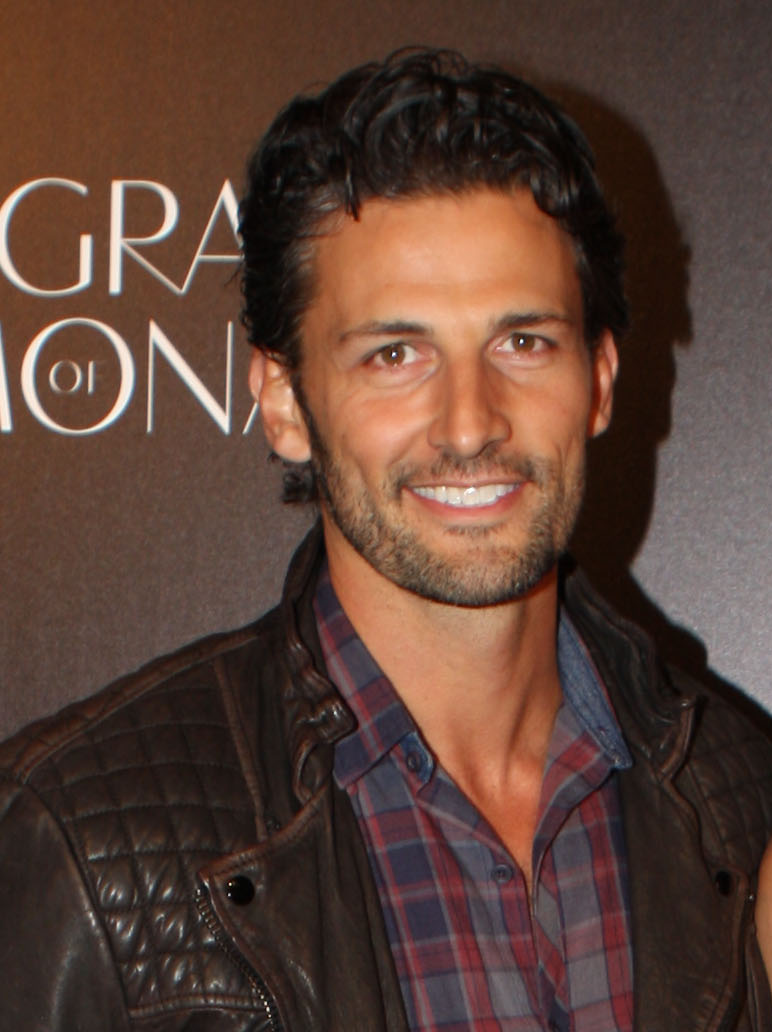
Tim Robards plays Pierce Greyson who was developed as Nicolette's love rival and enemy.

Nicolette and Chloe become engaged but writers did not plan to continue their romance. On-screen, Chloe feels their relationship is rushed. Pengilly explained that other characters are "excited and supportive" of their engagement. Chloe's doubts arise from her dramatic year of stories, which the actress explained as "the divorce, miscarriage, her mother dying" and a terminal illness. She told TV Week's Masia that "Chloe needs some time to collect her thoughts away from the pressure." She decides to spend the night at the Vineyard in Leo's company. Not wanting Nicolette to worry, she pretends to stay with Aaron and David, who agree to lie for her. Pengilly claimed that Chloe purely wanted "to buy herself sometime" without worrying Nicolette. But the story does not play out as such. Chloe awakes the following morning with hangover and no recollection of the previous nights events. She is in bed with Leo's jacket and worries she has cheated on Nicolette. Chloe feels guilty and decides to inform Nicolette about the incident. Nicolette discovers that Chloe has lied about her whereabouts before Chloe can confess and assumes that she has had sex with Leo. Chimes described her character as "confused" and "heartbroken" by Chloe's behaviour and the fact Aaron and David lied to her. Nicolette break-up with Chloe and flees Erinsborough.

Nicolette's relationship with Chloe was also problematic because of Chloe's previous romance with Elly Conway (Jodi Anasta). The duo were popular with viewers who gave them the portmanteau "Chelly". Pengilly herself has been vocal that she would always be "team Chelly" and stressed that she worried fans thought she was betraying the popular relationship by supporting Chloe and Nicolette's romance. Nicolette and Chloe have a "lovely connection" and "sweetness" about them which Pengilly liked and she was "really happy and proud" to continue portraying same-sex couples on the show. Chimes believed that a sub-section of fans liked Nicolette and Chloe's relationship and created the rival portmanteau "Chlic". She believed that Chloe and Elly's relationship differed because writers developed it over time, whereas Nicolette and Chloe were put together "quickly".

=== Lottery scam ===
To explore Nicolette's backstory, producers introduced Zahra Newman as Audrey Hamilton, who is an old friend of Nicolette. When Audrey arrives in Erinsborough, it is clear that she and Nicolette are hiding a secret crime. Audrey feels guilty and wants to confess but Nicolette is desperate to silence Audrey. Newman told Hadley (TV Week) that her character is intimidated by Nicolette and confronting her over their secret is a "big deal". She added that Audrey is "desperate to clear her conscience" but Nicolette concocts her own plan to "right their wrongs". Newman warned that Audrey was "prone to guilt" and doubted she could keep their secret much longer. Nicolette begins to panic about Audrey's guilt and Pierce grows suspicious of Nicolette and questions Audrey. Nicolette continues to pressure Audrey into keeping silent. Other characters begin to notice Nicolette's hostility towards Audrey. Karl Kennedy (Alan Fletcher) witnesses an argument between the two and accuses Nicolette of workplace bullying.

=== Surrogacy ===
In 2020, Neighbours production decided to tackle the social issue of surrogacy within gay relationships. Nicolette became involved with resident gay couple David and Aaron. Nicolette hears about the duo's struggle to find a surrogate mother and she offers to help. Nicolette definitely wants to have children but being gay makes it harder to do so. Chimes branded it the perfect opportunity for Nicolette because she gets the family she always wanted. Chimes described David and Aaron as Nicolette's role-models because they represent a "good" and "solid" gay couple, which was something absent from Nicolette's upbringing. She added "she looks up to them and puts them on a pedestal." When the storyline was first pitched, Chimes had doubts about Nicolette's behaviour before and after giving birth. But her worries faded and she expressed her happiness with the way writers developed the story. To portray Nicolette's pregnancy, Chimes wore five different prosthetic stomachs during filming. The final prosthetic had to be strapped to Chimes' back because it was large. The prop made Chimes feel uncomfortable, especially during an instance she filmed seventeen scenes in one day, which resulted in Chimes having a sore back.

The story begins during a comedic episode in which Nicolette, David and Aaron get drunk and Nicolette offers to help. Chimes explained that Nicolette does not think before she speaks but manages to convince herself it is a great idea regardless. Writers marred the trio's happiness throughout the surrogacy story, often creating conflict resulting from Nicolette's many secrets. Nicolette was determined to prove to Aaron and David that she could change. She begins to work herself to exhaustion, which results in her being rushed to hospital. Aaron is more accepting of Nicolette's behaviour than David, who found it difficult to forgive her constant lying. However, she begins to alienate Aaron too. Wilson told Masia (TV Week) that Nicolette's "skeletons have been coming out the closet" ever since they agreed her to be their surrogate. He noted that once they resolve an issue, Nicolette creates another. He warned that Nicolette's behaviour is "starting to wear thin" with Aaron, but an ultrasound appointment forces him to put their problems aside. They become excited as they attend the scan and Wilson believed Aaron and David decide to put their unborn child first and "let bygones be bygones." Honda assessed that the story was no longer about surrogacy and not about co-parenting, since Nicolette planned to be involved in the child's upbringing by posing as a "cool aunt".

Another part of Nicolette's ready-made family is Aaron and David's foster children Emmett Donaldson (Ezra Justin) and Brent Colefax (Texas Watterson). Writers used them to create more peril for Nicolette as she grows closer to them. When she suspects that Brent is committing crimes, Emmett tracks Brent down to local business, The Hive. There he discovers Brent and Holden Brice (Toby Derrick) are carrying out a robbery. Nicolette follows and gets caught up in the drama, with Holden pushing Nicolette into a heavy cabinet, which falls on top of her. Chimes told Masia that Nicolette is in a state of frantic worry as she is trapped underneath it with abdominal pain and bleeding. She fears that she is losing her unborn child but her "maternal instincts kick in as she tries to do everything to save her baby." Outside Holden knocks down her would be saviour, Curtis Perkins (Nathan Borg), who damages his cochlear implant and is unable to her Nicolette's cries for help. Jane later arrives and saves Nicolette. The incident leaves Nicolette hospitalised and fearing her unborn child will die. Brent feels guilty when Emmett initially tries to take responsibility for the heist. Following the incident, Nicolette decides to issue Aaron and David with an ultimatum that she chooses herself and their baby or their foster children. Emmett decides to leave Erinsborough and David and Aaron blame Nicolette for his departure. Chimes defended her character's behaviour stating "Nic isn't malicious, and it's not about punishing Brent or Emmett - she's just a protective first-time mum." She added that Nicolette has "legitimate concerns" about bringing a child up around Brent and Emmett.

After this, the aforementioned dramas with Chloe and Leo occur. Nicolette then visits Chloe and Leo to his vineyard for a picnic. She leaves them alone to find a picnic spot but trips and injures herself, leaving her unborn child in jeopardy. Chimes added that Nicolette is left terrified once again. When Nicolette discovers Chloe could have cheated on her and that Aaron and David lied to her about it, she punishes them by fleeing Erinsborough. Chimes described Nicolette emotions in the scenes as "absolute fury, rage, devastation and disbelief." She thinks her new family have already betrayed her and disappears. Kano revealed that David blames Leo for Nicolette's disappearance and he angrily punches Leo. Honda told Ellis that David has "a huge amount of frustration" towards Leo. In addition, Leo feels strongly about their choice of a "volatile surrogate" and blames them. Honda told Masia that Nicolette's disappearance confirmed his characters "fears" about her. He added that David "knew he couldn't trust Nicolette - her past actions were all evidence." Honda believed that his traditionally ethical character was suddenly willing to "cross whatever line" needed to find Nicolette and get their daughter back. David's behaviour begins to upset Aaron, but Honda defended David noting that Nicolette had left him feeling "distraught" and "self-destructing". Wilson believed that Nicolette "made a fool of Aaron and David" even though they knew she was "forceful but flighty".

=== Baby swap plot ===
In one of Nicolette's most controversial stories, she sold someone else's baby and pretended it was her own daughter. On 22 July 2021, the Neighbours production team removed Nicolette from the series' opening titles after she absconded. To tease viewers, the character's future was not commented on by the production team who kept the story's outcome a secret. Nicolette reappeared on 9 and 10 August, in scenes set in Canberra, before returning to Erinsborough on 20 September. She was restored to the opening titles later in the same week. Chimes revealed that producers pitched the baby swap story in 2021. They needed to film the scenes set in Canberra before the Australian state borders closed due to coronavirus restrictions. The scenes filmed in Canberra were filmed during a one day location shoot. They feature Paul visiting Audrey who helps him to locate Nicolette in a park.

When Paul finds Nicolette, he is shocked to discover that she has already given birth and he concocts a scheme to purchase Nicolette's baby for David and Aaron. Dennis explained that Paul was partly responsible for Nicolette's disappearance because he verbally abused her. Dennis described Paul as "supremely annoyed" with Nicolette's behaviour but he also needs to "cover his own tracks" for his part in her absconding. Dennis noted that it was typical of Paul to throw money at a problem, but more shockingly Nicolette agrees to the transaction. Dennis defended his character's deception and paying off Nicolette. He told Scott Ellis from TV Week that "in his own way, Paul thought that pursuing Nicolette and the whole baby debacle was the right thing to do for his family." Paul returns with baby Isla and hands her over to David and Aaron. Wilson told Ellis that Isla's arrival is a "shock", the story was "tense" but they are "happy" to have their child. Wilson explained that people soon become suspicious of how Paul persuaded Nicolette to hand over her daughter. He added that he was willing to bet money that the audience could not figure out the complex story would play out. As the following episodes were broadcast, viewers discovered that Nicolette had actually sold someone else's child to Paul. The scenes occur when Britney Barnes (Montana Cox) arrives in Erinsborough and follows David and Aaron. She then abducts Isla. Levi Canning (Richie Morris) finds Britney and orders she hand Isla back. Writers added another surprise twist to the story, with Britney revealing Isla is actually her daughter Abigail and that Leo is the father. Cox told Penwill that all involved characters are "very shocked", they find it "very confusing" and "no one really has any idea what's going on." She added that story twist was "so out of the blue".

Nicolette returns to Erinsborough with Isla to face the consequences of her scam. She reveals that she met Britney during an antenatal class and discovered she was pregnant with Leo's child. She then convinced Britney to go to Canberra with her where they gave birth. But Britney developed post-natal depression and Nicolette spotted a chance to sell her baby on. Chimes thought the baby swap was a "great twist", whereas Wilson and Honda were not as keen. She reasoned that they perhaps were not impressed that Nicolette manages to victimise herself and shift blame. Chimes stated "Nicolette comes out looking very good in all of this; not the big, bad villain that everyone thinks she is." Chimes believed that Paul was the real villain in the story because paying for a child "was ludicrous, it was bribery, he was completely in the wrong." Chimes insisted that Nicolette always planned on returning to Erinsborough but needed time to get over Chloe's betrayal. Chimes added that her character is not interested in Chloe's excuses and wants to concentrate on Isla. Nicolette wants to move on and create a new parenting agreement with David and Aaron. They are not so forgiving, Chimes described them as "bewildered, devastated and angry" with Nicolette. Nicolette then reneges on her agreement to allow Aaron and David to be the primary care givers to Isla. Paul then decides to launch a legal case to gain custody of Isla for David and Aaron. This compromises his historic friendship with Jane and she attempts to convince him to drop legal proceedings.

When Nicolette returned, Chimes revealed that she received a positive reaction from her fans. She added she was hopeful that general viewers would side with Nicolette and direct their anger at Paul's character. Despite Chimes' earlier hopes, Nicolette's behaviour throughout the story polarised viewers. Chimes later revealed that she revelled in how upset the baby plot made viewers. She branded the story "so controversial" because it enraged fans against Nicolette. Chimes added "It was so funny reading all the stuff online about how much people hated Nicolette, but I'd much rather be talked about as a character than not at all." She also felt "fortunate" to be entrusted with one of the show's main storylines for an entire year. Chimes later told Metro's Patterson that initially, she found the story difficult because Nicolette was constantly arguing with Aaron and David. After the story culminated, Chimes expressed that she "really loved" it and was glad that the trio finally formed a friendship.

=== Kiri Durant and conclusion ===
In 2022, Neighbours writers developed a new romance story for Nicolette with a new regular character, Kiri Durant (Gemma Bird Matheson). Nicolette and Kiri first meet when Nicolette travels to a country retreat called River Bend. Scenes featuring the pair demonstrated an attraction which grew as they spend more time together. They kiss but the rest of Nicolette's friends are caught up in a violent drama caused by Gareth Bateman (Jack Pearson). Nicolette does not tell Kiri she has a daughter and conceals her past lies. When Kiri finds out she refuses to see Nicolette. Matheson told Inside Soap's Ellis that Kiri dislikes drama and is "pretty quick to shut it down" because she is guarded when she sense someone will hurt her emotionally. When Kiri's parents sell River Bend, she decides to take a job at the vineyard with Nicolette's neighbour, Glen Donnelly (Richard Huggett). He soon learns that Kiri is his daughter and does not want her to know. He attempts to encourage Kiri to leave by bad-mouthing Nicolette. When Nicolette discovers Glen's sabotage, she confronts him and he falls into a pool of water which is "too much" for Kiri and wants nothing to do with Nicolette. Matheson explained that "I think this is the scene that Kiri realises she's in over her head with Nic. There's obviously tension between Glen and Nic, and Kiri doesn't want to be a part of it." When Paul and Nicolette realise Glen is hiding a secret, they team up to expose him. When they do so, Kiri is devastated to learn that Glen is actually her father. Kiri blames Nicolette but she refuses to accept responsibility. Her behaviour causes Kiri to grow close romantically to Chloe.

The story continued with Chloe convincing Kiri to think of Nicolette differently and they even become friends again. Writers then introduced Asher Nesmith (Kathleen Ebbs) as the show's first non-binary character. When Asher appears, Jane informs them that Nicolette is single. It was quickly developed into a "love-triangle" style story, when Nicolette and Asher begin to date. Kiri becomes jealous and responds by sleeping with Chloe despite them deciding to remain friends. Nicolette goes on a second date with Asher and they get along well, but Kiri had been warming to Nicolette's softer personality. Nicolette is left with a dilemma because she believes that she and Kiri could have had a good relationship. Kiri later realises that she wants to be with Nicolette rather than Chloe. Kiri asks Nicolette to accompany her on a date to River Bend where they first met and they reconcile.

Also in 2022, it was announced that Neighbours had been cancelled after its British broadcast partner Channel 5 withdrew funding for the show. Chimes made her final appearance as Nicolette during the show's finale episode, which was broadcast on 28 July 2022. In the show's final weeks, producers cast Joe Klocek to play Nicolette's brother Byron Stone. Together they team-up to expose Jane's love interest Clive Gibbons (Geoff Paine), when they suspect he is being unfaithful. Chimes has claimed that Nicolette's final stories were rushed because of the show's cancellation. She revealed that there were plans to introduce Nicolette's father into the show. Chimes expressed her disappointment she was not able to explore more of Nicolette's family history more. She added "that was one thing I was really looking forward to – exploring the Jane and Nicolette dynamic and how the dad would affect that." Chimes also would have liked to portray Nicolette resuming her nursing career. Of leaving the role, Chimes concluded "there were so many times I'd say to myself: 'I can't believe this is work. I feel so grateful and happy'. So those are some of the fondest memories."

=== Return and recast ===
In 2023, Neighbours returned after Amazon Freevee decided to bring the show back. It was explained on-screen that Nicolette had decided to leave Erinsborough with Isla, shortly followed by Aaron and David. Chimes declined the offer to reprise the role upon its return, but disclosed during a livestream with fans that the role would be recast.

Producers reintroduced Nicolette alongside David and Aaron in a special week of flashback episodes exploring stories that occurred during a two year time lapse that occurred whilst Neighbours was off air. Hannah Monson was announced as having taken over the role in November 2023. Monson made her first appearance as Nicolette on 14 November 2023, although she was also credited for the previous episode. The flashback episodes explore their reasons for leaving, ultimately revealing that Nicolette, David and Aaron were implicated in Paul's cover-up of Krista Sinclair's (Majella Davis) apparent death.

In a promotional Instagram video, Monson described Nicolette as "a really interesting, juicy character which is want you want as an actor". She expressed pleasure at playing a queer character as a queer actor, as well as teasing "anarchist behaviour" from Nicolette and that "secret after secret" would be revealed. Monson anticipated negative reaction to her portrayal as both a new actor and the replacement of the "well-loved" Chimes; she had made a "funny little video" with Wilson and Honda in an attempt to appeal to fans before her debut, and was pleased that the initial fan response to her was largely approving.

=== Stalking storyline, David's death and reunion with Kiri ===
At the beginning of 2024, Nicolette was taunted by a mystery figure, suggested to be connected to her breakup with Kiri. Teasing the storyline, Herbison explained that "Nicolette likes to walk a moral tightrope, and gets herself in situations that nobody else ever would. We love it when we have a chance to explore that!" It was later shown that Nicolette was being pursued by Veronica McLain (Ellen Grimshaw), who blamed her for breaking up her marriage to Sasha McLain (Sunny S. Walia).

In late January, Neighbours teased a storyline where Nicolette, David, Aaron, Leo and Krista embarked on a holiday, revealing that one character would die. Monson revealed that Nicolette would fear for her life when Veronica appeared at the holiday home, though the encounter becomes "almost intimate" as the characters begin to relate to each other. Ultimately, David was the character who was killed following an altercation with Eden Shaw (Costa D'Angelo). Nicolette's ensuing storylines saw her struggle with the pressure of looking after Isla on her own while Aaron grieves, causing friction between the two parents. Nicolette later begins to gather evidence of Aaron's transgressions.

After Kiri returns to Erinsborough, her, Byron and Nicolette all invest in Leo's vineyard, and Nicolette and Kiri ultimately renew their relationship. Digital Spy spoilers reveal that the two will plan to move in together, and Nicolette "suggests bringing Aaron". However, spoilers written by Daniel Kilkelly for Digital Spy reveal that Kiri discovers the "secret record" Nicolette has been keeping against Aaron. Nicolette had previously started recording evidence against Aaron and was planning to use it in a custody dispute over Isla. Kiri subsequently ends her relationship with Nicolette and leaves Erinsborough. Following Kiri's departure, writers continue to develop a difficulty in Nicolette and Aaron's relationship, which is shown when he discovers the list "evidence" that she has been keeping against him, with spoilers revealing that Nicolette's world will come "crashing down". Hannah Monson tells TV Week that "Nicolette explains that her insecurities got the better of her", and that she is now "terrified that Aaron won't forgive her". As a result, Jane kicks her out of the house and she is forced to move in with Byron and Krista. Jane and Aaron eventually forgive her and invite her to move back in with them at Christmas.

=== Relationship with Yasmine Shields ===
In late 2024, Neighbours began teasing a possible romance for Nicolette, with new American guest character Yasmine Sheilds (Chrishell Stause), with spoiler photos released by Digital Spy showing Nicolette getting to know Yasmine at Harolds cafe. Further spoiler pictures show the two on a picnic date and cozying up next to the Lassiters lake. Advance spoilers reveal that Nicolette and Yasmine will go on a date to the piano bar at Lassiters, before Yasmine's "mood suddenly changes" and she "rushes out in tears". It goes on to say that Nicolette will "chase after her", and Yasmine explains that she is grieving the loss of her brother, who undenounced to Nicolette, is Heath Royce (Ethan Panizza), whom Nicolette's neighbour Holly Hoyland (Lucinda Armstrong Hall) killed in self defense after he tried to shoot her. Yasmine initially uses Nicolette to get close to Holly, but spoilers later reveal that they begin to get "heart to heart".

However, this begins to halt as Yasmine keeps calling off their dates due to becoming to focused on pursuing revenge on Holly, with spoilers revealing that she will "cancel their brunch plans last minute", leading Nicolette to ''end things with Yasmine". Further spoilers reveal that Nicolette will begin to resort to her old villainous ways as she discovers Yasmine's connection to Heath, and that she is plotting to kill Holly for revenge. Spoilers reveal that Nicolette will follow Yasmine to the airport as she tries to make an escape after her attempted electrocution of Holly injures Max Ramsay (Ben Jackson) instead. The spoilers read that she "takes pity" of Yasmine when she tells her that "grief pushed her to some extreme actions". Upon hearing this Nicolette tells her to "get on the plane and go", despite Yasmine saying she will turn herself in, but she listens to Nicolette and reluctantly leaves.

The spoilers continue and discover that Leo discovers that Nicolette secretly saw Yasmine at the airport, and he uses it to blackmail her into firing Sebastian Metcalfe (Rarmian Newton) from Harolds cafe. Advanced spoilers written by Daniel Kilkelly for Digital Spy reveal that Krista will hear her revealing her secret to Leo, and she is now "forced to face the music" over her decision, which receives "mixed reactions" from Erinsborough residents. As she explains her side of the story to Aaron and Byron, Holly walks in and overhears her "betrayal".

== Reception ==
Charlie Milward from the Daily Express branded Nicolette a "Neighbours troublemaker" who was down on her luck. Milward assessed that Nicolette was originally "shrouded in mystery" and a suspect villain. The critic believed she mellowed via her involvement with David and Aaron, though he believed Nicolette's "sinister streak" could easily resurface via her feud with Glen. He later noted in just two years, Nicolette was always "at the centre of a lot of drama" but approaching the show's finale her life was "seemingly on the up for a change." Regarding Nicolette's relationship prospects with Kiri, Simon Timblick of Whattowatch.com opined that Nicolette's scheming against Glen "didn't really do herself any favours." Though he added that Nicolette appeared to have "love and compassion" that Kiri found endearing. Timblick believed Pierce's later treatment of Nicolette was "extra humiliating and disappointing" because she made an effort for Hendrix's wedding cake. He proceeded to call her a "volatile" and "fiery redhead".

Stephen Patterson of Metro heaped praise on Nicolette and her character development, from which he assessed she had "come a long way" in just two years. He recalled that upon her memorable introduction, Nicolette had a "penchant for scheming and manipulation, and had something of a habit of leaving chaos in her wake." He believed that writers managed to keep Nicolette on an even trajectory preventing her from being irredeemable amidst her "nefarious activity". He added that Chimes gave "stunning performances" as Nicolette was gifted an "excellently paced redemption arc." Patterson believed that by the time Neighbours ended, Nicolette was a "popular" and "iconic character" who "cemented herself as a firm fan-favourite." Television director Lee Salisbury branded Nicolette "fiery just like her hair, speaks before she thinks and doesn't apologise." Sarah Ellis from Inside Soap assessed "there's nothing we love more than a proper, old-fashioned 'soapy' story - and they don't come much more soapy than Nicolette selling a fake baby to Paul Robinson for a million dollars!" Her colleague, Alice Penwill described Nicolette as unpredictable, writing that she felt sorry for "poor David and Aaron" because "who knows what Nicolette will do next". In 2022, Susannah Alexander from Digital Spy was optimistic that Nicolette's love life would improve because she believed that Kiri's personality had "potentially promising traits for an ongoing romance with Nicolette." In 2024, Chloe Timms from Inside Soap praised Monson's portrayal of Nicolette, writing that she was "perfect" for the rebooted show and called her a "star" that she loves. The following year, in response to a viewer's opinion that Cara Varga-Murphy (Sara West) should leave her wife and get together with Nicolette, Timms wrote, "I say this with love: Nicolette is a complete nightmare!"
