= Hannah Monson =

Australian actress (born 1992)

- Born: Hannah Eve Monson; 21 April 1992 (age 34); Mildura, Victoria, Australia
- Education: Federation University Australia
- Occupation: Actress
- Years active: 2013–present
- Known for: Glitch as Kirsten "Kirstie" Darrow; Neighbours as Nicolette Stone

Hannah Monson (born 21 April 1992) is an Australian actress best known for her role as Kirstie Darrow in the ABC drama Glitch. Since 2023, she has starred as Nicolette Stone on Network 10's soap opera drama Neighbours.

Monson was born and grew up in Mildura, a regional city in North West Victoria, Australia. She moved with her family to Melbourne's Eastern suburbs at the age of twelve.

Hannah Monson received her high school education at Ringwood Secondary College, before then attending Federation University Australia.

== Filmography ==
=== Film ===
Year	Title	Role	Notes
2015	The Ashes of Isadora Ivan	Erica	Short film

=== Television ===
Year	Title	Role	Notes
2014	Winners & Losers	Alana Shaw	Episode: "Ctrl-Alt-Delete"
2015–2019	Glitch	Kirstie Darrow	Main role
2017	The Leftovers	Young Woman	Episode: "G'Day Melbourne"
2020	Halifax: Retribution	Sian Kelly	3 episodes
2021	Tara Tremendous	Charlotte Dupont	12 episodes (podcast series)
2022	Hot Department: Dark Web	TikTok Ghost	1 episode
2023–2025	Neighbours	Nicolette Stone	Main role
