= Rarmian Newton =

Australian actor

- Born: Melbourne, Australia
- Occupation: Actor
- Years active: 2003–present

Rarmian Newton is an Australian actor from Melbourne. He is known for his roles in American television series. Newton began his career as a child actor in Australia. His first television role was in an episode of the American horror series Nightmares & Dreamscapes: From the Stories of Stephen King. He gained theatrical prominence via the role of young Allen in The Boy from Oz. His titular role in the Australian production of Billy Elliot the Musical gained him a "Best Male Actor" accolade at the 2008 Helpmann Awards. He also appeared in episodes of Australian drama series. Newton moved to the US when he was aged twenty-one and began working in American television series. He played the recurring role of young Danny Warren in the thriller series The Family and later the regular role of Maashous Evers in the musical drama series Rise. In 2019, he joined the regular cast of crime drama Mr. Mercedes, playing Peter Saubers in the show's third season. In 2024, Newton played the role of Sebastian Metcalfe in the Australian soap opera Neighbours.

== Career ==
Newton was born in Melbourne, Australia. His parents were supportive of him wanting to pursue an acting career as a child. Newton performed as a flying acrobat in the opening ceremony of the 2006 Commonwealth Games in Melbourne. Newton's first television role was in an episode of the American horror series Nightmares & Dreamscapes: From the Stories of Stephen King.

His early stage roles included the 2006 role of young Allen in The Boy from Oz. He also played the titular character in the original Australian production of Billy Elliot the Musical. Newton was aged fourteen when he took on the role, which debuted in Sydney in December 2007. He was one of four actors who played the role on rotation during the tour. For his performance in the musical, Newton won the Helpmann Award for Best Male Actor in a Musical at the 2008 Helpmann Awards. The award was shared with three other actors. Newton won the "Outstanding Performance in a Stage Musical" accolade at the 2009 Australian Dance Awards. The award was shared by both the Sydney and Melbourne cast of the show.

In 2012, Newton and Riley Miner played the role of Hiccup in the US tour of How to Train Your Dragon Live Spectacular. Newton was one of five Australian actors hired in the show's main cast, and he began training in 2011 with DreamWorks Animation and Global Creatures on the production. That year he also appeared in the teen drama series Dance Academy. In 2014, Newton played young Garry in the Australian miniseries titled INXS: Never Tear Us Apart, which dramatised the history of the rock band INXS. He then played the role of Paul Wooton in an episode of the Australian television series The Doctor Blake Mysteries.

When Newton was aged twenty-one, he decided to move to Los Angeles to pursue his career in the US. In 2016, Newton took his first US recurring role, playing young Danny Warren in the American thriller series The Family. To accommodate filming for the role, Newton relocated to New York City, which he found difficult because both moves occurred just months apart.

In 2018, Newton secured the regular role of Maashous Evers in the American musical drama series Rise. The series was originally titled Drama High and Newton had been cast in the lead role for the pilot. Newton was cast by Tiffany Little Canfield and Bernard Telsey, who recalled that he "nailed that mystery of that character" and branded him "really talented" for his American accent. Newton believed his background in musical theatre helped him suit the role. Maashous was portrayed as a homeless teenager and Newton related to the character from his experiences of moving to the US without his parents. Newton also recalled being interested in the role because the show features a performance of the musical Spring Awakening, which was then his favourite musical.

In 2018, Newton gained the guest part of Ethan Davies, in the American thriller series Tell Me a Story. The role was billed as a "charming and persistent" school student. He then joined the cast of US horror drama NOS4A2, playing the recurring role of Drew Butler. The character was described as a prep-school friend of a fellow character who had a "hidden sensitive side". In 2019, it was announced that Newton had secured a regular role in the third season of American crime drama Mr. Mercedes. Newton played Peter Saubers, a "smart and personable" teenager.

In 2022, Newton appeared in an episode of New Amsterdam, a US medical drama series. In 2024, Newton secured a guest role in the Australian soap opera Neighbours, playing Sebastian Metcalfe. The role was billed as a dramatic one, with Sebastian "set to send shockwaves through Erinsborough for a long time to come". Newton was happy to play the role because he had "much love and respect for show". The character was introduced as an old friend of an established character, Krista Sinclair, and Newton made his first on-screen appearance on 18 September 2024. In October 2024, it was announced that Newton would play Frodo Baggins in the Australian theatre tour of The Lord of the Rings – A Musical Tale.

== Filmography ==
Year	Title	Role	Notes
2006	Nightmares & Dreamscapes: From the Stories of Stephen King	Bobby Fornoy	Guest role
2011	Faces	Markus - young	Short film
2012	Dance Academy	Michael Slade	Guest role
2014	INXS: Never Tear Us Apart	Young Garry	Guest role
2014	The Doctor Blake Mysteries	Paul Wooton	Guest role
2016	The Family	Young Danny Warren	Regular role
2018	Rise	Maashous Evers	Regular role
2018	Tell Me a Story	Ethan Davies	Guest role
2019	NOS4A2	Drew Butler	Guest role
2019	Mr. Mercedes	Peter Saubers	Regular role
2022	New Amsterdam	Derek Wilkinson	Guest role
2024–2025	Neighbours	Sebastian Metcalfe	Guest role
2026	Deep Water	Matt	Film

== Awards and nominations ==
Year	Association	Category	Nominated work	Result
2008	Helpmann Awards	Helpmann Award for Best Male Actor in a Musical	Billy Elliot the Musical	Won
2009	Australian Dance Awards	Outstanding Performance in a Stage Musical	Billy Elliot the Musical	Won
