= Mackenzie Hargreaves =

Fictional character from the Australian soap opera Neighbours

- Neighbours character
- Portrayed by: Georgie Stone
- Duration: 2019–2025
- First appearance: 30 August 2019
- Last appearance: 11 December 2025
- Introduced by: Jason Herbison
- Spin-off appearances: Neighbours: Erinsborough High (2019)
In-universe information
- Occupation: Student; Lawyer; United Nations Human Rights Lawyer
- Father: Grant Hargreaves
- Husband: Hendrix Greyson (2022); Haz Devkar (2024–present)
- Aunts: Trish Symington

Mackenzie Hargreaves is a fictional character from the Australian soap opera Neighbours, played by Georgie Stone. She made her first appearance on 30 August 2019. Mackenzie is the soap's first transgender character, added to the series after Stone wrote to executive producer Jason Herbison to pitch the character. She arrives as a new student at Erinsborough High School and is connected to the established Rebecchi family, who she knew prior to her gender transition. Following her initial guest storyline, Mackenzie was a central character in spin-off series Neighbours: Erinsborough High before being promoted to the regular cast of Neighbours in 2020. She remained with the series until its finale episode, broadcast on 28 July 2022, and reprised the role when the series resumed on 18 September 2023. Her exit aired on 17 September 2024. Stone reprised the role again in 2025 for the show's final episode.

Following an initial focus on her transgender identity, Mackenzie's later storylines aimed to treat the character similarly to other female soap characters. The character is portrayed as ambitious and desiring "fairy tale" experiences where she is fully treated as a woman. Her relationship with Hendrix Greyson (Ben Turland) leads to marriage after he is diagnosed with a life-threatening condition; he dies shortly after the wedding, leaving Mackenzie a widow. Subsequently, she enters into a relationship with Haz Devkar (Shiv Palekar). The character and the soap's use of transgender storylines were positively received, though Mackenzie's "self-righteous" stage and her lack of a happy ending following Hendrix's death received some criticism.

== Creation and casting ==
As a trans person, I didn’t see people like myself on screen very often – it would often be a very tragic character, and never played by a trans actor. Because of this, I internalised the message that being trans was something to be ashamed of. In March 2018, at the beginning of my final year of school, I decided to make a leap of faith and email the executive producer of Neighbours.

— Georgie Stone

Stone approached the show about introducing a transgender character in 2018. She wrote a letter to executive producer Jason Herbison with some ideas and received a response two hours later. Following an audition, Stone was cast as Mackenzie and she worked with the producers for eight months to ensure that parts of her own story would be included in the character's storyline. Mackenzie is the show's first transgender character, and the second trans actress to portray a trans character on Australian television. Stone's casting was announced on 23 March 2019. Stone stated "I am so excited to be joining such an iconic show. Neighbours is all about telling stories we can connect to, stories that reflect our society today. It has progressed so much since it first began, which is why I thought it was time to have a trans character on the show. I can't wait for everyone to meet her!" Herbison added that during her audition, he became aware that Stone "would be able to tell the story truthfully and authentically".

Stone began filming her scenes in June 2019, with her initial storyline running for two months. Mackenzie is connected to established character Shane Rebecchi's (Nicholas Coghlan) past, and attends Erinsborough High School. Stone worked with the Neighbours writers to ensure Mackenzie's transgender identity was portrayed authentically. Stone was complimentary of the experience, stating that "I was surprised at how switched on the writers were, at how eager they were to get this right. They were really good listeners." Stone explained to a columnist for The Australian Women's Weekly that she knew her character's story would have to have drama, but she helped to "ensure it's truthful at the same time" by including various experiences that trans people go through, including coming out, relationships, and shame due to bullying. Stone also wished for Mackenzie to be "just be a regular teen at the same time, and get caught up with the teen drama which has nothing to do with her being trans."

In a guest editorial for Metro, Stone outlined her motivation for pitching the character and the choices made to bring her to the screen, stating that "when we can see ourselves reflected in the characters on our screens, it allows us to feel seen and acknowledged". Stone claimed that "I wanted to tell an overall positive story for all the young people who watch the show, while not shying away from some of the difficult experiences trans people face (these stories need to be told). I wanted the message to be, ‘you will be OK, you are loved’, not ‘you are the problem, this is your fault and you will probably die alone’." She described the aim of the character as "educational and hopefully beneficial for the trans community but, at the end of the day, remain[ing] an exciting and compelling story that fits in with the wider world of Neighbours." Ultimately, Mackenzie avoids being a "token trans character" and "isn’t used as a tool in other characters’ stories, but is given her own arch where she can grow and evolve, and bring other people along with her." Stone affirmed that Mackenzie is "absolutely the character I wish I had seen as a kid."

== Development ==
=== Characterisation, introduction and initial storyline ===
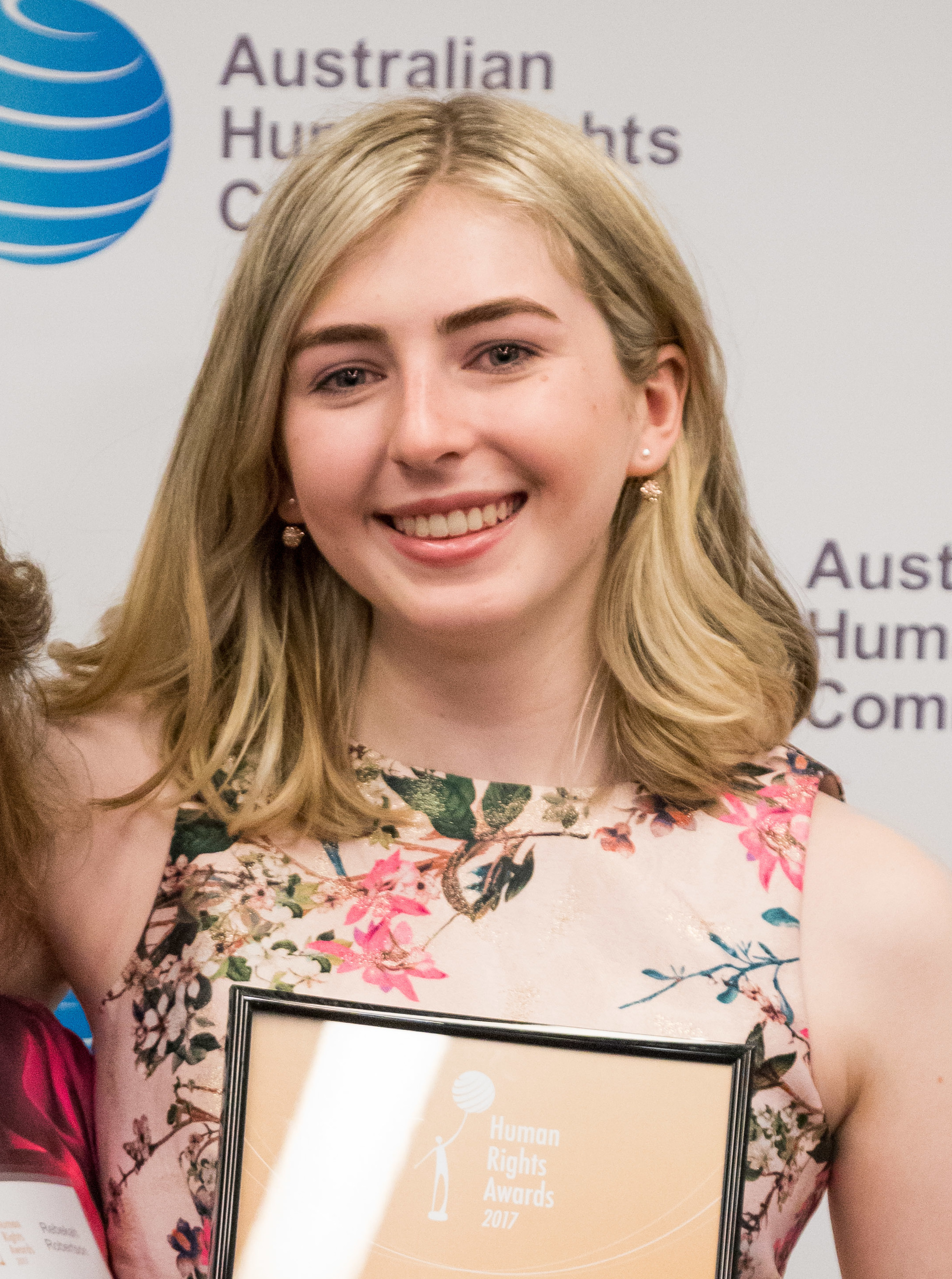
Georgie Stone made her screen debut in August 2019.

Shortly before her introduction, Stone gave more details on Mackenzie's fictional background, explaining that her father rejected her from a young age and her mother, who was supportive, died a few years ago. Mackenzie has had a rough time and is not very trusting of people as a result. Stone added that her character is "a bit world weary, a bit cynical, a bit hardened by her experiences." Stone stated that Mackenzie "is a fully realised human; her desire for love and safety, and her fear of rejection and isolation generate a very interesting dichotomy." Her backstory and characteristics were designed with the intention of separating the character of Mackenzie from Stone's own personality. Stone subsequently described Mackenzie as "an alternative reality version of myself". She explained that "Mackenzie carried more shame and anxiety with her and she’s definitely less confident in herself [than me], and less trusting of other people, and I wanted her to come across as someone who’s really really unsure of who she is, not in terms of her gender identity but in terms of who she wants to be as a person". Describing Mackenzie's journey, Stone described how "sometimes when you’ve been bullied for a long amount of time like Mackenzie, or she’s had years of trauma, it’s not something that you can shake very easily... It’s not a black and white journey from A to B of going from ashamed to not anymore, it’s kind of a cycle or bumpy road where it’ll all come back".

Mackenzie's initial storyline saw her arrive as a new student at Erinsborough High and befriend Yashvi Rebecchi (Olivia Junkeer). Yashvi recognises Mackenzie and wonders if they knew each other in her home town of Bourke, before noticing Mackenzie's interest in her father, Shane Rebecchi (Nicholas Coghlan). This leads Yashvi to suspect that her father had an affair and Mackenzie is his secret daughter, forcing Mackenzie to reveal that she knew the family prior to her gender transition. While Yashvi is portrayed as supportive of Mackenzie, the story explored transphobia when she made an unguarded comment that Mackenzie "used to be a boy", both revealing her limited understanding and outing Mackenzie to the student body. Subsequently, Mackenzie is bullied and threatened not to use the school's girls' toilets and principal Susan Kennedy (Jackie Woodburne) asks her to use the disabled bathroom until the situation is resolved. Yashvi and Shane are upset by this, with the former staging a peaceful protest by encouraging all other students to use the disabled toilets in a display of solidarity.

Mackenzie is also searching for her estranged father, Grant Hargreaves (Paul Mercurio), who failed to make contact after her mother died, upon her arrival in Erinsborough, and enlists Shane's help to find him. As the storyline continues it emerges that, in addition to Grant's rejection of her transgender identity, Shane shared his ignorance and encouraged Grant to burn her belongings. Shane's guilt leads him to confess to Mackenzie, who struggles to forgive his past actions. Shane eventually locates Grant and asks him to come to Erinsborough, but Mackenzie is disappointed to discover his attitudes have not significantly changed. The storyline culminates when Grant fails to attend the father-daughter dance at Mackenzie's school formal, with Shane electing to dance with her in his place.

Shortly after her introduction, Mackenzie shares a flirtation with Hendrix Greyson (Ben Turland) when they both attend a party, after which she wonders whether to tell him she is transgender. She briefly leaves the party to seek advice, and when she returns she "tentatively" comes out to Hendrix, whereupon he calls her "the hottest girl at the party" and kisses her. Although Hendrix and Mackenzie attend the school formal together, they spend little time together and she witnesses him kissing Olivia Lane (Grace O'Sullivan).

=== Moving to Ramsay Street and family relationships ===
On 19 October 2019, it was announced that Stone would be promoted to the regular cast in early 2020, following a positive response to the character, the storyline, and Stone's performance. Stone expressed her delight at the news and looked forward to exploring Mackenize further. Herbison planned to develop the character so that "transgender doesn't even warrant the batting of an eyelid", something he deemed to be a "powerful" movement. Mackenzie returned to the series from 4 February 2020.

A short time later, Mackenzie's aunt, Trish Symington (Katherine Tonkin), announces she is moving to Fremantle, prompting Mackenzie to look for an alternative place to live. Feeling unable to ask Shane and Dipi Rebecchi (Sharon Johal) following the death of their friend Gary Canning (Damien Richardson), Mackenzie schemes with Roxy Willis (Zima Anderson) to trick Trish into leaving her alone in her flat. After struggling with living alone, Mackenzie invites Mannix Foster (Sam Webb) to rent her spare room, unaware of his criminal nature, leading to a police raid on the flat. Following this, the truth of Mackenzie's living situation comes out and the Rebecchi family invite her to stay with them.

Grant was subsequently reintroduced amidst episodes themed around LGBT pride. Grant returns to Erinsborough claiming to want to spend time with Mackenzie, though he actually intended to ask Toadie Rebecchi (Ryan Moloney) for legal advice after suffering an injury. Grant attends a Lassiters Pride event with some discomfort, but publicly describes Mackenzie as his daughter after winning a bingo game. Later, Mackenzie learns of the motivation for Grant's visit on the day she is due to read from her diaries as part of a Writers' Festival. The shock of the revelation causes Mackenzie to pull out of the event, but Grant reads some entries on her behalf. Stone wrote the diary entries read aloud by Grant and Dipi, and was credited as a co-writer of the episode. She stated that she was "really thrilled to be asked to write [the entries] because Jason wanted them to be as authentic as possible". Stone also "chose the years for each event and personal moment for Mackenzie". The scenes culminated in a breakthrough for Mackenzie and Grant's relationship, as she witnessed his reading of her diary and he then apologised for his past treatment of her. Commenting on the future for the characters, Stone stated that "It is a process. He hasn’t become a completely different person, but I think what has changed is that he is trying to be the best father he can possibly be and Mackenzie can see that – and she appreciates his efforts".

=== Relationship with Richie Amblin ===
Mackenzie's first significant romantic relationship is with fellow student Richie Amblin (Lachlan Millar). Richie is initially portrayed as an ignorant bully, but displays a more understanding side when he supports Mackenzie in the protest around the school's toilet facilities. Their relationship progresses over the following year, though Mackenzie feels increasingly pressured to have sex with him. Feeling insecure in her relationship, Mackenzie blames Richie for Dipi and Shane's separation due to his earlier role in Shane's drug addiction. Shortly after, it transpires that Richie has rated Mackenzie's sexual performance on an app ranking female Erisnborough High students, seeking to defend her from circulating rumours. Upon learning this, Mackenzie ends the relationship.

Stone acknowledged her disappointment that the writers chose to end Mackenzie and Richie's relationship, noting that "we'd been filming this relationship for a year and we loved Erinsborough High as well. That's probably one of my proudest moments, being in that show. So, I was actually devastated when I found out they were breaking up". She also expressed her wish that Millar would "stick around forever" and join the main cast of Neighbours, as they had become close friends while working together. However, from Mackenzie's perspective she recognised that "what [Richie] did was sexual harassment and it was serious. It was a full breach of trust".

=== Gender confirmation surgery ===
In 2020, Mackenzie was depicted as undergoing gender confirmation surgery following her eighteenth birthday. Stone spoke to the media in promotion of the storyline, in conjunction with her own transgender activism. Speaking to Adam Bloodworth of Huffington Post, Stone expressed her desire for the story to be handled "well and respectfully", emphasising that "this surgery isn’t making Mackenzie a girl - she is already a girl, she just wants this for her own comfort, this is purely for her own benefit but it’s there so she can now move on". She related Mackenzie's journey to her own experience, stating that "I’m proud of who I am and I’m proud to be trans, and then sometimes there are these moments that I just really wish that I wasn’t... those feelings of shame creep in again when you’re feeling especially vulnerable or something’s happened in your life. What I wanted with Mackenzie was to show that it’s a process". Bloodworth suggested that the story "may be the last time Mackenzie’s gender identity is dealt with directly", as the soap transitions towards approaching Mackenzie's storylines "in the same way they would be for any other young female character on the show".

Speaking to Lily Wakefield of PinkNews, Stone stressed the wider importance of depicting Mackenzie's surgery. She claimed that "because this story hasn’t really been told very much before, it’s a subject that a lot of trans people don’t feel comfortable with talking about because it is very private and there are a lot of misconceptions around surgery... I think it will be significant because for many people it will be the first time they are learning about gender confirmation surgery for trans people and why it’s important". She also explained the decision to focus on Mackenzie's choice to undergo surgery rather than the physical process, pointing out that in conversations with Richie "she tells him that she’s doing this for herself and it’s not for his benefit, not for anyone else’s benefit, but her own". Stone summarised that "this is something she’s always been waiting for, and now that it’s happened it’s not really a matter of her finally feeling like her true self, but finally feeling like she has everything she needs to move forwards in her life and be herself". Speaking to Radio Times, Stone discussed the importance of the support Mackenzie receives from the Rebecchis, Richie and Harlow Robinson (Jemma Donovan).

=== Relationship with Hendrix Greyson ===
The connection between Hendrix and Mackenzie was revisited in 2021, as they establish a romantic relationship. Laura Masia of TV Week noted that the pair's friendship was "a constant" throughout the previous year, and Stone replied "After all the drama and pain of the past year, they've found a safe place with each other where they can have a laugh and be happy and forget about the world for a bit." The dynamic between them changes after Hendrix asks Mackenzie to help catch a spider and they nearly kiss. Stone explained to Masia that as they try to get the spider off the couch, they accidentally fall into each other's arms. The spark from the first time they met comes back and there is a clear attraction between them. Stone joked, "The spark has always been there – they just needed a little Neighbours hijinks to push them in the right direction!" Hendrix and Mackenzie think their friendship has been "ruined", but they clear the air and decide to remain friends. However, when Mackenzie cancels plans to hang out with him, Hendrix misses her company and his reaction hints at his strong feelings for her.

Stone admitted to having a bad reaction to the pairing because she was heavily invested in her character's relationship with Richie. She thought Richie was what Mackenzie needed at the time, but she was enjoying the more playful, happier side of her character that Hendrix brought out in her. She also said Hendrix made Mackenzie feel more "grounded" and "sure of herself". When asked by Joe Julians of the Radio Times if Mackenzie was being honest with herself about why she only wanted to be friends with Hendrix, Stone replied "I think she was starting to like him that way but I don't think she was cognisant of it. I think she was very keen to just chalk it down to friendship and finding new closeness with someone after her recent love issues, so I don't think she thought that it was romantic. I think she was telling the truth." Hendrix and Mackenzie hold off on telling Harlow about their romance to avoid upsetting her, following her own relationship break up. Stone pointed out that Mackenzie also puts off actually dating Hendrix properly, but it becomes harder for her to keep everyone happy.

The opportunity to tell Harlow is taken away from the couple when she walks in on them as they are getting closer. Stone called it a complicated situation and told Sarah Ellis of Inside Soap: "Mackenzie and Hendrix are leaning in for a kiss – they're holding hands, and it's a really charged moment. Harlow walks in and sees, and obviously it's a very shocking thing to witness your best friend kissing your ex-boyfriend!" An angry Harlow accuses the pair of dating behind her back and the friendship between her and Mackenzie breaks down. When asked who Mackenzie would choose out of Harlow and Hendrix, Stone replied that Harlow was Mackenzie's first proper friend, while her romance with Hendrix is "adorable". She thought her character would be angry if Harlow made her choose, especially as their whole friendship group would fall apart, but it would make for good drama to play out. Weeks later, the couple make plans to have sex for the first time and Hendrix prepares a romantic dinner. But just as Mackenzie arrives, one of the candles falls over and starts a fire, ruining the night.

In late 2021, Turland teased some trouble for Hendrix, following the introduction of teenager Zara Selwyn (Freya Van Dyke). Hendrix supports Zara when she is accused of setting a series of fires and becomes isolated from her friends and job. Their friendship causes issues between Hendrix and Mackenzie. Hendrix is caught off-guard when Zara kisses him. Stone said Mackenzie is "hurt and furious" with Zara when she finds out about the kiss. She is also upset with Hendrix, but she feels more betrayed by Zara. At the same time, Mackenzie realises that the evidence for Zara being the arsonist does not add up. She finds Zara at the school, where they soon become trapped by a fire started by Sadie Rodwell (Emerald Chan) and Aubrey Laing (Etoile Little). While Zara manages to get out, Mackenzie is stuck and almost passes out, but Hendrix goes inside and helps her into an air vent. Stone told a TV Week columnist that Hendrix starts to accept that they will likely die, until a firefighter appears and gets them out.

As a consequence of the fire, Hendrix is later diagnosed with pulmonary fibrosis. This prompts him to take Mackenzie to his home city of Sydney to visit his parents. There, Hendrix makes the spontaneous decision to propose to Mackenzie. Speaking to Inside Soap's Alice Penwill, Turland explained that Mackenzie has "opened Hendrix's eyes to a different way of thinking. She makes his life a little less chaotic, and more wholesome." He continued saying that the trip forces Hendrix to think about who and what he wants in his life, so proposing to Mackenzie makes sense.

The wedding takes place a few weeks later, before Hendrix undergoes a lung transplant. Writers created a fairy tale wedding for the couple, which is something Mackenzie had often brought up in the show. Stone called Hendrix the love of Mackenzie's life and she thought the wedding brought both characters' story arc "full circle". He later told Ellis that Hendrix and Mackenzie's relationship was important for the show on many levels. He thought there were "a lot of good messages" to come out of the storyline. He also said that while it covered "a lot of bases", their relationship was ultimately "very caring" and he was glad that he and Stone were the couple to do that. Stone admitted to being jealous of Pierce's gift of a mortgage-free apartment for the couple to start their life together.

=== Widowhood ===
Shortly after the marriage, Hendrix dies when his lung transplant is rejected. Although Hendrix's death was conceived prior to Neighbours' cancellation, it took place on-screen close to the finale episode. Stone expressed the importance of providing Mackenzie with some hopefulness before the show ended, explaining that "in telling stories about grief, we need to acknowledge and show people that there is hope afterwards and your life doesn't end with this loss. I think it would be a disservice to this wonderful trans character, who has meant so much to so many people, to have her end in this really dark, devastating place".

On-screen, Mackenzie is initially shown hiding the extent of her grief from those around her, accepting a letter of condolence from Sadie but destroying it in private. Grant returns to Erinsborough to support his daughter, but intervenes to conceal videos of Hendrix in an attempt to protect Mackenzie's feelings. Upon learning of this, Mackenzie asks him to leave. Harold Bishop (Ian Smith), who was reintroduced as part of the show's final weeks, eventually provides Mackenzie with support by sharing his own experience of grief.

In February 2023, Mackenzie's return as series regular was announced as part of the series' resumption. When Neighbours returned in September 2023, Mackenzie was living in a share house with Byron Stone (Xavier Molyneux) and Haz Devkar (Shiv Palekar). Her initial storyline in the revival focuses on the possibility of her pursuing a new romance with Haz. Comparing Mackenzie to her situation upon Hendrix's death, two narrative years prior, Stone stated that "she is in a much better place... she's making the choice now whether she's ready to move forward and get back out there in terms of dating and relationships". Stone disclosed that she was open to remaining with Neighbours long term, praising the stories Mackenzie had been given. Mackenzie later decides she is not ready for another relationship and gives her friend Holly Hoyland (Lucinda Armstrong Hall) permission to date Haz, before herself growing closer to Byron. The growing tension with Holly then leads Mackenzie to temporarily leave Erinsborough. Mackenzie and Haz ultimately become a couple after she assists his dog, Trevor.

=== Hacking storyline and departure ===
From March 2024, Mackenzie was involved in a storyline concerning deepfakes and digital identity. The storyline began when Harold's Café, which Haz runs, is broken into. Haz is later sent a video that seemingly shows him causing the damage, prompting him to bug Mackenzie and Byron's phones. Mackenzie becomes suspicious of Haz's behaviour after he reacts angrily to her attempts to arrange security cameras for the café. Mackenzie later catches Haz attempting to return stolen money to Holly and then discovers a hard drive with files used to perpetrate a number of deepfakes across the neighbourhood. It is revealed that Haz and his associates in IT had a history of using their skills to produce deepfakes and hacks against targets, including Wade Fernsby (Stephen Phillips). Mackenzie arranges to meet with Wade, unaware that he is the perpetrator of the recent digital attacks, and becomes his primary target as a result. Eventually, a confrontation between Haz and Wade culminates in Mackenzie accidentally running over Haz. Haz falls into a coma, leaving Mackenzie confronted with her memories of losing Hendrix.

In July 2024, the character was announced as being involved in the forthcoming "Death in the Outback" storyline, during which promotional material stated that one character would depart the series. The storyline saw Mackenzie and Haz follow Holly to a remote cattle station after she absconded for Erinsborough with Heath Royce (Ethan Panizza). While Heath was killed during the episode first shown on 22 August, Mackenzie and Toadie were both also left in potentially fatal circumstances. After Heath fired a number of gunshots into the bush, Melanie Pearson (Lucinda Cowden) found Mackenzie seriously injured. Stone described the filming of Mackenzie and Haz's arrival to the Outback in a helicopter as "one of the most incredible moments of my life".

After she recovers from her injuries, Mackenzie and Haz decide to get married and move to Paris, resulting in both characters exiting the series. Stone decided not to continue in the role, having viewed the opportunity to return with the series as a chance to conclude Mackenzie's story on a more positive note. She was "surprised" by her character's second wedding, but opined that "after everything she has been through Mack wants to hold on tight to what she has", and appreciated that the Neighbours producers had acceded to her request for a happy ending. She described Mackenzie's romantic and career fulfilment as "a really beautiful way to finish her story". Stone also reflected positively that "Mackenzie never compromised her integrity" despite the traumatic events of her five years on screen, highlighting the character's "empathy, her kindness and her strong sense of justice" as "inspiring". Prior to the wedding, Wade is admitted to Erinsborough Hospital from prison and suggests he is plotting revenge on the couple. Mackenzie and Haz marry and leave Erinsborough unaware of the danger presented by Wade; after their departure another character crashes Haz's car, which has been tampered with.

Both Stone and Palekar reprised their roles as Mackenzie and Haz for the show's final episode in 2025. The characters arrived, along with other returnees, to view a new housing development after Ramsay Street's future came under threat.

== Other appearances ==
Following her initial Neighbours storyline, Stone reprised her role in the November 2019 spin-off series Neighbours: Erinsborough High, which takes place during the Year 12 exam period and explores various issues that affect teenagers at school. The storyline of Erinsborough High saw Mackenzie and Richie begin their relationship, with Richie overcoming his anxiety around Mackenzie in person while she expressed her wish not to have sex yet. The latter development was followed up in Neighbours the following year.

== Reception ==
Academics Damien John O'Meara and Whitney Monaghan identified Mackenzie's introduction as part of a trend in Australian scripted television towards queer "narratives focused on self-identity and authenticity", along with the casting of transgender and non-binary actors. Writing in The Guardian, Alex Gallagher reacted positively to Mackenzie's introduction to Neighbours ahead of her first appearance. Gallagher stated that "representation on screen might not help disadvantaged or vulnerable groups achieve equal rights in any real way but it does help displace white, cis, straight and able bodies who have been seen as the universal human identity for too long". They also praised Stone's role in pitching the character, stating that "while we’re seeing more and more trans characters on our screens, actual trans people have often been locked out of telling our own stories". Gallagher associated Stone's portrayal of Mackenzie with the LGBTQ casts of Pose, and asserted that "there is some nice, uncomplicated good in a young trans person playing a young trans character on a beloved, long-running program".

Lisa Woolford of The Advertiser described the character as "sweet, kind, compassionate and intelligent", whilst also noting that "her defences are up and she doesn't trust people". Stone's performance was praised by Bridget McManus of The Sydney Morning Herald, who noted that she was making "a sterling go of her debut acting gig", while also commending the storyline as "a landmark step in the right direction for Australian television". Daniel Kilkelly of Digital Spy praised Stone during the storyline of Hendrix's illness, stating that she had "delivered some exceptional performances recently as Mackenzie's world has been shattered by the sad news about Hendrix". For her performance, Stone was longlisted for Best Daytime Star at the 2020 Inside Soap Awards, and for the same award in 2022.

Some fans and Neighbours directors expressed displeasure around Mackenzie's character in the period following her gender confirmation surgery. Stone later explained that she had wished for the character to become more "assertive" at this time, but recognised that this had come across as "self-righteous". Stone wished for some more "lightness" in the character, which was achieved through her participation in a lip sync battle and developed further through her relationship with Hendrix. Annie Wallace, the first transgender actor to play a transgender character in UK soap opera with her role as Sally St. Claire in Hollyoaks, criticised the decision to kill Hendrix on Twitter, viewing this as preventing Mackenzie from reaching a happy ending in favour of a "tragic trans" conclusion. After Mackenzie was shot in 2024, Kilkelly believed she was unlikely to die due to the previous backlash over her unhappy ending following Hendrix's death.
