= List of Neighbours characters introduced in 2024 =

Neighbours is an Australian television soap opera. It was first broadcast on 18 March 1985 and airs on Amazon Prime Video (formerly on Amazon Freevee) in the U.K. and U.S.A., RTÉ in the Republic of Ireland and Network 10 in Australia. The following is a list of characters that first appear in the show in 2024, by order of first appearance. All characters are introduced by the show's executive producer Jason Herbison. Veronica McLain (Ellen Grimshaw), Alyssa Gavalas (Imogen Sage), Slade Westall (Charlie Di Stefano), Chelsea Murphy (Viva Bianca) and Sasha McLain (Sunny S. Walia) made their debuts in January. Felix Rodwell (James Beaufort) was introduced in February. Victor Stone (Craig Hall) and Amira Devkar (Maria Thattil) arrived in May. Logan Shembri (Matthew Becker) debuted in June, Quinn Lao (Louis Lè), Rhett Norman (Liam Maguire) and Heath Royce (Ethan Panizza) were introduced in July. Max Ramsay (Ben Jackson), Sebastian Metcalfe (Rarmian Netwton) and Yasmine Sheilds (Chrishell Stause) arrived in November.

== Veronica McLain ==
Veronica McLain
- Neighbours character
- Portrayed by: Ellen Grimshaw
- First appearance: 4 January 2024
- Last appearance: 1 February 2024
- Introduced by: Jason Herbison
In-universe information
- Husband: Sasha McLain

Veronica McLain, played by Ellen Grimshaw, made her first appearance on 4 January 2024. Grimshaw confirmed her casting via her Instagram account. She wrote that Veronica would be a "mysterious woman who seems more than just a little bit annoyed" by the established character Nicolette Stone (Hannah Monson). Writers introduced Veronica during a storyline in which Nicolette is taunted by a mystery person who leaves random keys around the entrance to her home. On 28 December 2023, Iona Rowan from Digital Spy previewed a spoiler photograph showing Grimshaw and Monson in character. Her colleague Daniel Kilkelly confirmed that Veronica would arrive in Erinsborough seeking revenge against Nicolette after she is confirmed to be the culprit leaving the keys for Nicolette to find. He added that Veronica blames Nicolette for ruining her marriage to Sasha McLain (Sunny S. Walia) and his later disappearance. Kilkelly added that Veronica is "ruthless" and threatens Nicolette into helping her find Sasha. In her debut scenes it is revealed that Veronica's husband knew Nicolette's ex-girlfriend, Kiri Durant (Gemma Bird Matheson) from a church group. Nicolette suspected that Sasha was untrustworthy and seduced him to expose his true intentions to Kiri. However, Nicolette's behaviour caused the break-up of both her own and Sasha's relationships.

Veronica was revealed to be the main suspect in a storyline centric to the disappearance of Isla Tanaka-Brennan (Hana Abe-Tucker), who is Nicolette's young daughter. Isla disappears while attending a local jumble sale and her disappearance is initially unexplained. A Neighbours publicist told Sarah Ellis from Inside Soap that "there's every chance she could have snatched Isla" because she has been blackmailing Nicolette. She does not believe Veronica would kidnap a child, but Nicolette's brother Byron Stone (Xavier Molyneux) convinces her to call the police. The publicist added that Nicolette "may have underestimated her opponent on this occasion."

Kilkelly revealed that Veronica would continue her revenge campaign. This time Veronica threatens Nicolette and Isla's fathers, David Tanaka (Takaya Honda) and Aaron Brennan (Matt Wilson). Veronica is included in location filmed episodes featuring an undisclosed character death. Kilkelly added that Veronica follows Nicolette, David and Aaron to a holiday home. Veronica confronts Nicolette and accuses her of holidaying with Sasha. Nicolette is then tasked with convincing Veronica otherwise again. Kilkelly branded Veronica a "new villain" and noted she "turns even nastier" as the story progresses.

Veronica leaves a series of keys around Nicolette's home. She incorrectly presumes the keys are from Sasha and goes to a hotel room to confront him. Inside she finds and empty room with lingerie left as a gift. Nicolette begins to suspect that Sasha is following her until she witnesses Veronica waiting in a car outside her home. Nicolette confronts Veronica who tells Nicolette she wants revenge for her breaking-up her marriage. She threatens to tell Nicolette's family she has tried to seduce her church attending husband, if she does not cooperate in finding Sasha. Nicolette explains to Veronica that she ceased contact with Sasha. When Veronica spends time with Nicolette's family, she decides to apologise fully for ruining the McLain's marriage. Nicolette explains that Sasha was flirting with her girlfriend, Kiri during Bible class. Nicolette claims that Sasha flirted with her too and decided to seduce him and expose him as a liar. When Nicolette is distracted, Veronica takes her daughter Isla and leaves her alone outside of a police station. Nicolette accuses Veronica of abducting her child, but there is insufficient evidence for police to apprehend her. Jane Harris (Annie Jones) confronts Veronica but this causes her to become more hostile. Veronica tries to turn Isla's father, David against Nicolette. Veronica witnesses Nicolette and Sasha talking and presumes they are dating. Veronica follows Nicolette and her friends to a country side holiday resort. She breaks into their accommodation and confronts Nicolette. She convinces Veronica that she never had an affair with Sasha. Veronica is present when David is killed on the holiday trip. She later messages Nicolette offering her emotional support.

== Alyssa Gavalas ==
Alyssa Gavalas, played by Imogen Sage, made her first appearance on 10 January 2024. Details of the character were revealed in advance spoilers issued on 4 January 2024. Daniel Kilkelly from Digital Spy reported that Alyssa is the original owner of Haz Devkar's (Shiv Palekar) rescue dog, Trevor. Alyssa meets Byron Stone (Xavier Molyneux) walking Trevor in the park and immediately recognises her lost dog, whose name is actually Bodie. He added that Alyssa would seek contact with Haz to reconnect with her former pet. Haz is upset at the prospect of losing Trevor and seeks legal advice. Alyssa appears again on 22 January. A Neighbours publicist told Sarah Ellis from Inside Soap that Alyssa would continue to seek out Haz. They added that "Alyssa really tugs on Haz's heartstrings" as she explains what Trevor meant to her family. When Alyssa reveals the dog was a present from her dead mother and her son Max Gavalas (Jethro Cassar), Haz reconsiders and agrees to give Trevor back to the Gavalas family.

Alyssa meets Byron walking Trevor in the park and recognises him as her lost dog Bodie. She asks for Haz's details but Byron gives her his own telephone number. She contacts Byron but Haz refuses to speak to her. He later contacts Alyssa and pretends he does not have Trevor. Haz later contacts Alyssa to apologise and she requests that they meet up. Alyssa explains to Haz what the dog meant to her family and her son Max. Haz feels guilty and agrees to let Trevor to return to his former owners. Alyssa and Max collect Trevor and take him home. Trevor runs away from Alyssa's home and finds his way back to Haz. They recollect Trevor but Mackenzie becomes concerned and contacts Alyssa's husband, George Gavalas (Phil Hayden). He reveals that Trevor is not eating and is homesick and they agree to give Trevor back to Haz.

== Slade Westall ==
Slade Westall
- Neighbours character
- Portrayed by: Charlie Di Stefano
- First appearance: 17 January 2024
- Last appearance: 2 April 2024
- Introduced by: Jason Herbison

Slade Westall, played by Charlie Di Stefano, made his first appearance on 17 January 2024. Slade was originally introduced when he and a group of gang friends terrorised Melanie Pearson (Lucinda Cowden) after using a dating app to lure her into a trap. Daniel Kilkelly from Digital Spy reported that Slade would continue to appear in the series and lead a gang that cause trouble in Erinsborough. Its plot was soon confirmed to be an "ongoing gang storyline". JJ Varga-Murphy (Riley Bryant) becomes embroiled in the gang storyline when he confronts Slade over his acts of vandalism. Slade then begins to threaten JJ for talking to the police. Slade is later attacked by Aaron Brennan (Matt Wilson) for vandalising his dead husband's former business but Andrew Rodwell (Lloyd Will) rescues Slade. Slade continues to cause trouble with a spate of vandalism and graffiti against businesses in Erinsborough. Writers continued to escalate the gang violence plot with Slade attacking JJ for reporting him to the police. Neighbours producers told Kilkelly that JJ would get into "a whole world of trouble" in Slade's gang storyline. Slade's attack causes JJ to steal a knife to defend himself with but the weapon is discovered at his school, causing a lock down and police investigation. Kilkelly branded Slade "the new villain in town".

Slade contacts Melanie via a dating app to arrange a fake date. Melanie waits alone at the Tram restaurant until closing. Slade taunts Melanie from his car while she walks home. His friends record Melanie's reaction. They drive the car towards Melanie and when she shouts at them, Slade throws gunge over Melanie. Haz Devkar (Shiv Palekar) and Mackenzie Hargreaves (Georgie Stone) arrive to assist Melanie and Haz chases the car away. Haz forces Slade and his gang to leave Harold's Café after disorderly behaviour. They vandalise the Melanie's drinks business van and JJ orders them to stop. Aaron is furious that Slade graffitied the face of his dead husband David Tanaka (Takaya Honda) and attacks Slade. He then destroys other residents car tyres by scattering nails in a car park. Slade begins to threaten JJ and is ordered to leave Erinsborough High School, by principal Jane Harris (Annie Jones) for trespassing. Slade later attacks JJ and absconds, JJ responds by stealing a knife for protection but the weapon is discovered at the school. Police suspect Slade is behind the knife, but JJ later confesses and is suspended. Slade later kidnaps Hugo Rebecchi (Tanner Ellis-Anderson) and locks him into the boot of his car and goes joyriding. After his care tire blows he abandons his car. Hugo is later found by Aaron and returned to his home. Slade is confronted by Felix Rodwell (James Beaufort) who enlists Slade to help plan a robbery at a construction site. Slade is later spotted in town by JJ's mum Cara Varga-Murphy (Sara West), who performs a citizens arrest and turns him into the police.

== Chelsea Murphy ==
Chelsea Murphy, played by Viva Bianca, made her first appearance on 18 January 2024. Bianca's casting in an unnamed guest role was announced via a press release issued by Amazon MGM Studios in the United States. The character was announced in advance spoilers and it was revealed she would be introduced as the sister of established character Cara Varga-Murphy (Sara West) who gives her "an unexpected visit". Bianca revealed that the part of Chelsea is an extended guest role. In a backstage video, she stated "Chelsea sticks around for a while and has quite a bit of business to tend to, and is determined to do so." Bianca described Chelsea as "a really effective manipulator" and often has ulterior motives the surprise others. Bianca added that Chelsea has "always got something else kind of ticking."

== Sasha McLain ==
Sasha McLain, played by Sunny S. Walia, made his first appearance on 23 January 2024. The character and Walia's casting were announced by Daniel Kilkelly from Digital Spy on 15 January 2024. Sasha had been mentioned numerous times by other characters in the episodes prior to his debut. He is introduced as the estranged husband of Veronica McLain (Ellen Grimshaw). He arrives in Erinsborough to visit Nicolette Stone (Hannah Monson). Nicolette had previously seduced Sasha to expose him as a liar and ruined the McLain's marriage. Veronica threatened to expose Nicolette's scheming if she did not help her track Sasha down. Kilkelly added that when Sasha visits Nicolette, Veronica watches them from afar and becomes upset. Following his initial stint, Sasha returned in July 2024, shortly after Kiri Durant (Gemma Bird Matheson) returned to the series.

Nicolette visits Sasha asking for his help to stop Veronica's behaviour. Sasha presumes Nicolette wants to begin a romance, but she quickly corrects his assumption. She asks Sasha to inform Veronica that they never had an affair. Sasha claims that Nicolette had feelings for him which she eventually admits. Sasha fails to convince Veronica and she continues to harass Nicolette. Sasha visits Nicolette in Erinsborough but Veronica witnesses their meeting and presumes they are dating. Several months later, Sasha bumps into Kiri at their local church where he volunteers, cleaning up after it closed down. He informs her that he and Nicolette never had an affair and encourages Kiri to speak to Nicolette.

== Felix Rodwell ==
Felix Rodwell
- Neighbours character
- Portrayed by: James Beaufort
- Duration: 2024–2025
- First appearance: 26 February 2024
- Last appearance: 11 December 2025
- Introduced by: Jason Herbison
In-universe information
- Occupation: Labourer; Operator of The 82 tram
- Brothers: Andrew Rodwell (adoptive)
- Sons: JJ Varga-Murphy
- Nieces: Sadie Rodwell

Felix Rodwell, played by James Beaufort, made his first appearance on 26 February 2024. The character and Beaufort's casting details were announced on 12 February 2024. Felix is the brother of established character Andrew Rodwell (Lloyd Will), and he comes to stay with Andrew and his family on Ramsay Street. Daniel Kilkelly of Digital Spy reported that Felix would be sharing scenes with JJ Varga-Murphy (Riley Bryant) and revisiting a mystery storyline regarding JJ's paternity. He had previously suspected that Andrew was his father. Following Felix's on-screen debut, the paternity story continued with scenes alluding to Felix being JJ's biological father. Felix is confirmed to be JJ's father in subsequent episodes but conceals this from JJ and Andrew. In a backstage interview, Beaufort called it a "juicy, juicy secret that is going to be boiling and bubbling and frothing" until it is revealed.

Beaufort described Felix as a "supposedly reformed" character who is vocal about having changed. Though he noted, Felix is "probably lying". Will described Felix as Andrew's "funny, witty, smart-talking brother". He believed that Felix's introduction added extra dimensions to Andrew's character and paved way for new stories for his character. Will believed "the sad part" of the plot is that Andrew "genuinely" hopes that Felix is "reformed and changed." He added "it's been a lot of fun playing around with that relationship." Writers invested in Felix's backstory, which is detailed in episodes featuring Felix telling Andrew about his childhood insecurities. They portray Felix as frustrated that Andrew is regarded as the good guy and leaving himself always categorised as a bad guy. Felix plays up to the bad guy image when he plans a robbery at the Eirini Rising construction site. The robbery goes wrong and Felix is arrested and returned to prison. It was announced that Beaufort would make an additional appearance as Felix in prison scenes. JJ goes to visit Felix with Andrew, seeking answers about his father. The scenes were broadcast on 14 May 2024. Felix returned again in September 2024, after the character is seriously injured in a prison brawl and taken to Erinsborough Hospital for treatment. Daniel Kilkelly from Digital Spy branded Felix a "bad boy" type character.

Andrew visits Felix in prison to discuss his parole and he asks Felix if he provided a sperm sample to Philippa Wade. Andrew explains that Philippa gave it to Cara Varga-Murphy (Sara West) and the donor could be JJ's father. Andrew explains that pages were missing from Philippa's diary. Felix denies it but later studies a letter containing the missing diary pages. Andrew visits Felix again and agrees to back his parole and provides Felix a place to live on the condition he continues his good behaviour. Felix is paroled and moves in with the family. He starts forming a bond with his potential biological son JJ, and helps him with boxing lessons and fighting tactics, so he can defend himself against his tormentor Slade Westall (Charlie Di Stefano). Not long after Andrew finds Felix in the spa with his girlfriend Jools Halliday (Eva Seymour). He gets a job as a labourer at the Erinsborough High School and Eirini Rising development and plans to flee the country with Jools. He and JJ puncture Slade's car tire, and he convinces JJ to keep it a secret. Felix enlists Slade to help plan a robbery at the construction site. Andrew questions Felix about a break in at Harolds Cafe. Felix worries about not having an alibi, but JJ lies and provides Felix with a false alibi. Felix tells Jools he is bonding with JJ and wants to remain in Erinsborough. JJ's parents Cara and Remi Varga-Murphy (Naomi Rukavina) ban JJ from spending time with Felix. Holly Hoyland (Lucinda Armstrong Hall) flirts with Felix but Jools confronts her and rubs cake in her hair. Felix then tells Jools he wants to go leave again to distance himself from JJ. Felix discusses the planned robbery with Jools and JJ witnesses the conversation.

Felix lies to JJ that someone is threatening him and he needs to pay them off. JJ agrees to keep the planned robbery a secret to protect Felix. JJ is shocked that Felix has enlisted Slade's help. Felix tells JJ he made an agreement with Slade to prevent him bullying JJ further. Cara makes a citizens arrest after noticing Slade in the street. JJ offers to be Slade's new accomplice in the robbery, but he refuses. Holly finds a detailed plan about the Eirini Rising development and tells Andrew that Felix is planning a robbery. Felix goes ahead with his robbery and accepts JJ's help. Andrew interrupts the robbery, JJ attempts to drive off but knocks a scaffolding down onto Andrew. Felix tries to escape but Andrew reports Felix to the police. He attempts to meet with Jools to abscond, but the police intercept and arrest Felix. JJ discovers that Felix is his biological father and Remi arranges a meeting with Felix in police custody. She asks Felix to deny all contact with JJ, which he agrees to. JJ visits Felix in prison, where Felix admits he is not interested in being his father.

== Jeffrey Swan ==
Jeffrey Swan
- Neighbours character
- Portrayed by: Tim Potter
- Duration: 2024–2025
- First appearance: 10 April 2024
- Introduced by: Jason Herbison
In-universe information
- Occupation: IT Technician
- Sons: Thomas Murphy

Jeffrey Swan, played by Tim Potter, made his first appearance on 10 April 2024. On 2 April 2024, Simon Timblick from Whattowatch.com reported Potter's casting and character details. He revealed that Jeffrey is an IT technician who arrives at Lassiters to deliver a report into an IT glitch. His arrival panics Chelsea Murphy (Viva Bianca), who used the glitch to trap her business rival Krista Sinclair (Majella Davis) in a sauna room. Sara Baalla from Digital Spy reported that Jeffrey's report directly implicates Chelsea in the incident, which resulted in Krista losing her unborn baby. She added that Chelsea becomes determined to convince Jeffrey to doctor his report and makes him an "indecent proposal" in exchange. It was then confirmed that Jeffrey would appear in additional episodes, wanting to pursue a romance with Chelsea. Michael Adams from Metro reported that Chelsea is "left embarrassed" because it is "evident" that Jeffrey has "fallen for her". Jeffrey departed during the episode broadcast on 8 May 2024. Jeffrey returned in the episode broadcast on 9 December 2024, and shared scenes with recently introduced character Yasmine Shields (Chrishell Stause).

Advance spoilers written by David Kilkelly for Digital Spy reveal that Jeffrey would return again as a part of the storyline involving Chelsea and her newborn baby Thomas Murphy (Charlie Lyon). Further spoilers reveal that Jeffrey is "one of two possible dads" of Thomas, with the other being Paul Robinson (Stefan Dennis). Jeffrey arrives on Ramsay Street to do a DNA test and "keeps his distance" from Thomas, but promises to "support Chelsea" if he is the father. Paul is later revealed to be the father. Another return for Jeffrey was revealed in April 2024 for May 2024, which involves scenes where Jeffrey meets Chelsea at Harold's cafe, and spoilers revealing that he "returns with a bang", with the two having an "intriguing conversation." Further spoilers reveal that Jeffrey returns to tell Chelsea that he "swapped the paternity test results", meaning that he is the biological father of Thomas, not Paul.

Jeffrey arrives at Lassiters to deliver an IT report to Paul. He refuses to hand the report over to acting manager Chelsea. She follows him to The Waterhole pub and questions him about the report. Jeffrey asks Chelsea to buy him lunch in exchange for his findings within the report. He tells Chelsea that he has discovered the door lock request came from her username and vows to tell Paul she is responsible for locking Krista in the sauna. Chelsea propositions Jeffrey and they have sex in an office in exchange for him doctoring the report. Jeffrey visits Chelsea at Lassiters wanting to begin a relationship with her. Chelsea is forced to play along to keep Jeffrey from telling Krista the truth. Chelsea agrees to meet up with him again but Krista sees Jeffrey leaving Chelsea's hotel room. Krista demands to be involved in their next meeting. Krista delivers wine to Chelsea's room and discovers Jeffrey in there. He tells Krista that he is in a relationship with Chelsea and she leaves. Chelsea threatens Krista to keep quiet about their affair. When Chelsea and Paul get engaged, Jeffrey turns up with Krista and reveals their affair. Months later, Yasmine Shields (Chrishell Stause) asks Jeffrey to retrieve any software off her late brother Heath Royce's (Ethan Panizza) phone.

Several months later, Jeffrey arrives on Ramsay Street in order for Remi Varga-Murphy (Naomi Rukavina) to take his DNA sample to see if he or Paul is the father of Chelsea's newborn baby Thomas. He and Chelsea have a drink at the Waterhole where he points out that she wants Paul to be father, but she assures him she doesn't mind. Jeffrey keeps away from Thomas, before Paul is revealed to be his father. He later approaches Chelsea at the hospital while is Thomas is sick, and requests a chat with her. The two meet at Harold's cafe, where he tells her he swapped the DNA results and he is the biological father of Thomas. He reveals to Chelsea that he has had trouble finding work, and attempts to blackmail her for money in return for his silence, to allow her to stay close to Paul. Jeffrey goes to Chelsea's house, where she tells him she is a different person, and can't get money out of Paul.

== Wade Fernsby ==
Wade Fernsby, played by Stephen Phillips, made his first appearance on 17 April 2024. Phillips' character and casting details were announced on 25 March 2024. The character was announced as Zach Wade, and was initially credited as Zach Fernsby. Phillips previously appeared in the show as Cameron Hodder in 2003. His character is involved in a storyline centred around Haz Devkar (Shiv Palekar) and his mysterious behaviour. Haz's partner Mackenzie Hargreaves (Georgie Stone) meets with Wade as she investigates Haz's past. It was also revealed that Wade would feature in a deep fake and hacking storyline involving Haz. Promotional photographs showed Wade and Haz in scenes filmed on location, using their laptops. Daniel Kilkelly from Digital Spy reported that Wade would be "calling the shots" in the scenes as he intimidates Haz, resulting in a "high stakes chase" resulting in Haz being run over by a car. Wade returned again in a prison stabbing storyline which involves fellow inmate Felix Rodwell (James Beaufort). Kilkelly revealed that Wade would resume his revenge plans against Haz and Mackenzie as they prepare to move to Paris. He added that Wade would hire someone to tamper with Haz and Mackenzie's car which results in a car accident. Wade made his last appearance to date on 17 September 2024.

Mackenzie arranges to meet with Wade, who tells her the cruel things that her boyfriend, Haz and his hacking gang did to him. Wade reveals it ruined his marriage, his wife lost her job and no one believed his innocence. Mackenzie tells Haz she has met with Wade and is disappointed that he could ruin someone else's life. Mackenzie arranges another meeting with Wade, but he secretly relishes in the fact he has been committing hacking crimes against Haz and his neighbours. He forces Haz to join him and start helping him commit deep fake crimes, otherwise he will target Mackenzie. Haz agrees and they start working in a city building. Andrew Rodwell (Lloyd Will) and undercover officers secretly wait outside. Wade realises Haz has set him up and he absconds. A chase ensues and Haz is runover by Mackenzie in a car. Andrew catches Wade and places him under arrest. Holly Hoyland (Lucinda Armstrong Hall) sees Wade being taken away and she confronts him before he is taken to prison. Wade is later taken to hospital after being caught in up in a prison fight, he shares a room with Felix, who overhears him talking on a phone about planning to sabotage Haz and Mackenzie's wedding. Andrew later questions Wade, but he denies any plans to hurt Haz or Mackenzie. Andrew and Felix later discover that Wade ordered fellow prisoner Bowser Jones (John Klotz) to cut the breaks on Haz and Mackenzie's car. His plan fails when Terese Willis (Rebekah Elmaloglou) drives off in the car instead, causing her to hit a tree.

== Victor Stone ==
Victor Stone
- Neighbours character
- Portrayed by: Craig Hall
- First appearance: 14 May 2024
- Last appearance: 19 November 2024
- Introduced by: Jason Herbison
In-universe information
- Occupation: Pub owner and operator
- Wife: Jane Harris (divorced)
- Sons: Byron Stone
- Daughters: Nicolette Stone
- Granddaughters: Isla Tanaka-Brennan

Victor "Vic" Stone, played by Craig Hall, made his first appearance on 14 May 2024. Hall's casting details were announced on 22 April 2024. Producers had planned to introduce the character in 2022, however, the storyline was scrapped when Neighbours was cancelled. The character has often been mentioned on-screen by his family, which includes his former wife Jane Harris (Annie Jones), daughter Nicolette Stone (Hannah Monson) and son Byron Stone (Xavier Molyneux). Daniel Kilkelly of Digital Spy reported that Victor "wastes no time" getting reacquainted with his family and meeting his son's girlfriend Sadie Rodwell (Emerald Chan). The original plans for the character's 2022 introduction included Victor tempting Jane away from Clive Gibbons (Geoff Paine) and taking advantage of Karl (Alan Fletcher) and Susan Kennedy's (Jackie Woodburne) financial vulnerability. It was also revealed that Victor would be hiding a secret that Sadie becomes burdened with. Victor's arrival was previewed in a promotional trailer revealing the show's new storylines.

Victor's secret was revealed in unpublicised scenes, in which he announces he is terminally ill. Writers explored the effects of Victor's revelation has on Byron, Nicolette and Jane in subsequent episodes. In addition, Victor continues to meddle in his children's love lives. Daniel Kilkelly from Digital Spy assessed that "Victor's wild meddling" ways make Sadie feel uncomfortable. Writers introduced surprise scenes in which Victor is told his cancer is no longer terminal and is in full remission. Victor's improving health comes after his participation in immunotherapy trials.

Victor's initial stint ended on 2 July, and he returned from 7 October 2024. Victor's return story featured him being revealed as Melanie Pearson's (Lucinda Cowden) mystery date who she had been talking to on a dating application. A Neighbours publicist told Sarah Ellis from Inside Soap that Victor and Melanie develop a "connection" on the app, and she is "delighted" to learn he is just as "charming" in person. When Melanie realises Victor's true identity, she feels they cannot continue their romance. Victor's return also causes problems with Nicolette who refuses to forgive him. They revealed that "he's put his kids through a lot [...] it seems Nic has had enough of being let down by him."

Victor arrives in Erinsborough to reconnect with his children. Jane and Bryon are sceptical about his intentions, but Nicolette asks them to give Victor a chance. He claims to be struggling financially and asks Bryon to accommodate him. Victor checks his bank balance which is more than 1 million dollars. Victor meets Byron's girlfriend Sadie, who accidentally opens his laptop and discovers a secret, which he asks her to keep. Jane confronts Victor about his intentions for returning and is shocked when he returns a vase belonging to her grandmother, Nell Mangel (Vivian Gray). Jane thanks him but Byron and Nicolette become suspicious about how he could afford to buy back the vase. Sadie warns Victor that they are suspicious and asks him to tell the truth. Byron confronts Victor when he witnesses an uncomfortable exchange with Sadie. Victor reveals that Sadie discovered that he is terminally ill. Victor also reveals that he has over 1 million dollars left, and he wishes to use it to start a business for Byron and Nicolette to operate, however they are not keen on the idea. A frustrated Byron confronts Victor over his secrets. Victor organizes a mini golf day with Byron and Nicolette and gets Byron back on his side. He questions Byron about his relationship and future with Sadie, who explains that he could see a future with her eventually. Victor then takes this the wrong way and informs Sadie's mum Wendy Rodwell (Candice Leask) that Byron was discussing marriage and baby plans with Sadie to him, which shocks Wendy. After Nicolette tells him that she spent the night with Amira Devkar (Maria Thattil), Victor approaches her and asks her about her future plans with Nicolette, however she informs him that their night together was just a bit of fun and that she lives on the other side of the country. Byron and Nicolette are infuriated after hearing about Victor interfering in their love lives.

Victor becomes lost and collapses during a hiking trip with Byron, Nicolette and Jane. He is taken to hospital, before recovering at Jane's house. Jane's stepdaughter Sam Young (Henrietta Graham) is concerned when Victor rests in Jane's bed and worries about their relationship. Victor questions Jane about her relationship with Mike Young (Guy Pearce), but she dismisses his concerns. Jane loses her engagement ring and accuses Victor of taking it, who denies it. Jane apologises and he helps her search for it. Victor offers to invest in Leo Tanaka's (Tim Kano) vineyard, Yorokobi, as a business venture for Byron and Nicolette. Victor lowballs Leo with his offer and informs him that he can solve his financial crisis. Remi Varga-Murphy (Naomi Rukavina) asks Victor to attend a hospital appointment where she informs him that his cancer is in full remission. Victor declines to inform his family about his recovery. Jane confides her relationship troubles to Victor, who responds by kissing her. Leo accepts Victor's offer on the vineyard. Byron and Nicolette arrive home to letters informing them that Victor has run away and left them both $20000.

Victor later returns and goes on a date with Melanie, after they meet online. Jane, Byron and Nicolette spot them at the pub and approach Victor, and Melanie is shocked to discover that he is Jane's ex. Victor wants to take things further with Melanie, but she refuses. He tries to make amends with his family and offers them more money. Bryon and Nicolette refuse to forgive Victor. Jane begins to soften for Victor, and the two begin to spend time together. She convinces Nicolette and Byron to accept Victor's money to pay off debts. He buys Mike's motorbike that jane was selling, and later lists it for a higher price. Victor and Melanie continue a friendship, and he begins helping out at Erinsborough Hospital with chemo patients. He begins looking to buy a business around the area, and Melanie suggests he buy a pub in the nearby town of Gippsland. He goes to dinner at Jane's house, and she kisses him, and they begin a romantic relationship again. He stays later than planned and missed his dessert at Melanie's house, which leads her to believe he stood her up. Victor takes Jane to the Gippsland pub he was considering buying, which knocker her confidence in their relationship as she didn't see herself running a pub with him. He puts an offer on the pub, which is accepted. Jane decides to pause their relationship after Victor's growing closeness to Melanie. Nicolette becomes concerned and tells Melanie that he isn't interested in her. As a result of this, Melanie tells Victor that there is no chance of them being a couple, and he and Jane resume their relationship. Having Melanie around proves too many issues for them, so they separate for good. Victor attends Melanie's leaving party on Power road, and later leaves to move to Gippsland. Melanie comes to visit him in the pub and the two kiss.

== Amira Devkar ==
Amira Devkar
- Neighbours character
- Portrayed by: Maria Thattil
- First appearance: 21 May 2024
- Last appearance: 17 September 2024
- Introduced by: Jason Herbison
In-universe information
- Father: Sanjeev Devkar
- Mother: Reena Devkar
- Brothers: Haz Devkar

Amira Devkar, played by Maria Thattil, made her first appearance on 21 May 2024. The character and Thattil's casting details were announced on 7 December 2023. Thattil began filming her guest role during the same week. Of her casting, Thattil explained that she sent in a self-taped audition for another character when the serial began casting for the new series, which the producers "loved" and she received a call back for Amira instead. Thattil felt that she was joining the show at the right time and the opportunity was "so aligned to my deepest values". She continued: "I genuinely can't remember ever seeing a gay female South Asian Australian character on an Aussie TV show in my childhood and I always wonder how proper representation – beyond tokenism or exaggerated caricatures – would've changed some of my experiences with racism, homophobia, feeling like I didn't belong, wasn't normal or Australian enough. This role feels 'full circle' because it's giving me the chance to be the authentic representation that I, and wider Australia, has needed."

Thattil's character is the older sister of Haz Devkar (Shiv Palekar), who was introduced in 2023. A reporter for 10Play said Amira was "sometimes bossy" towards her brother and would "bring some flair to the vibrant world of Erinsborough." They also stated that due to "challenges with their strict parents", Amira and Haz would have "an emotional reunion". The reporter added that Amira's arrival would not be welcomed by everyone, even though she has her brother's "best interest at heart". Neighbours wrote on social media: "We're delighted to announce that Maria Thattil will be joining the cast next year" and they teased, "But why she turns up suddenly at Harold's is yet to be revealed". Alison Slade from TVTimes revealed that Amira would assume the role of the "bossy big sister". Amira's arrival was previewed in a promotional trailer revealing the show's new storylines. The trailer also revealed that the character would share scenes with Nicolette Stone (Hannah Monson). Upon her debut, it was revealed that Thattil would appear in six episodes in her guest role as Amira. After initially departing on 4 June, Amira briefly returned from 11 September. Amira made her last appearance to date on 17 September 2024.

Amira arrives to visit her brother, Haz in hospital where he is in a coma. She tells doctor Gavin Bowman (Cameron MacDonald) that no one else can visit Haz. Mackenzie Hargreaves (Georgie Stone) tries to reason with Amira, but she blames Mackenzie for running Haz over. Amira and Mackenzie get into an argument and Haz wakes from his coma. Amira tells Haz she forgives him and tries to dissuade him from reuniting with Mackenzie. She asks Haz to move back to his family home in Margaret River. Amira continues asking Haz to leave and he later agrees. Amira visits Haz's coffee shop and bumps into Nicolette where they realise they are wearing identical necklaces. Amira and Nicolette drink together at The Waterhole and have sex at Amira's hotel room. Amira admits she likes Nicolette but Victor Stone (Craig Hall) interferes, telling Amira to consider a future with Nicolette. Amira is off put by Victor's suggestions and tells an embarrassed Nicolette that she does not want serious romance. Amira also takes charge in looking after Haz at his home, side-lining Mackenzie's attempts. The two begin arguing about her control over Haz, and Amira announces that she is leaving. Mackenzie apologises and asks her to stay. Amira states that their fight is not her reason for leaving, and that she is needed at her work back home and leaves.

Amira returns for Haz and Mackenzie's wedding and reveals that her parents, Reena Devkar (Camille Gautam) and Sanjeev Devkar (Mark Silveira) may not be attending the wedding. She asks Mackenzie not to tell Haz until they are certain. Amira helps Byron Stone (Xavier Molyneux) put together a video of Haz's neighbours sharing their thoughts about him, to help convince her parents to come. Haz is upset when he discovers the truth but Sanjeev and Reena change their mind and attend the wedding. Amira says goodbye to Haz and Mackenzie before they leave to live in France.

== Logan Shembri ==
Logan Shembri
- Neighbours character
- Portrayed by: Matthew Backer
- First appearance: 24 June 2024
- Last appearance: 29 July 2024
- Introduced by: Jason Herbison
In-universe information
- Other names: Logan Chambers
- Occupation: Doctor; Drinks van worker

Logan Shembri, played by Matthew Backer, made his first appearance on 24 June 2024. The character and Backer's casting were revealed on 2 May 2024 via a promotional trailer for the serial's upcoming storylines. Logan will be introduced as a new love interest for Aaron Brennan (Matt Wilson). A show publicist later teased a "mysterious connection" for Logan and unnamed established character in the show. The show's executive producer Jason Herbison told Daniel Kilkelly from Digital Spy that Logan has a "chance meeting" with Melanie Pearson (Lucinda Cowden) while she is travelling and this is "the catalyst" for his arrival in Erinsborough. Herbison revealed that "there's more to him than meets the eye and he hones in on Aaron." He described it as an unconventional romantic storyline and Aaron is not ready for a new relationship. He concluded that the story has "very unexpected turns, which I don't think the audience will see coming."

Logan meets Melanie at her drinks van business, Drinks Divas and agrees to help her out. Logan reveals he is looking for a new beginning and does not want to return to his former home. Melanie suggests he returns to Erinsborough with her to see if he likes it and he agrees. Logan meets Melanie's friends and takes a keen interest in Aaron. Logan looks at an old photograph of him and Aaron dead husband David Tanaka (Takaya Honda) on his phone. Logan convinces Aaron to go running with him and then join him for a coffee. Logan steals Aaron's earphones and returns them as an excuse to visit his home. Logan looks at a photograph of David and Aaron when he is alone and behaves suspiciously. Logan and Aaron have a cocktail making lesson but Logan mimics an action that triggers a memory of David which makes Aaron angry. Remi Varga-Murphy (Naomi Rukavina) recalls meeting Logan at a medical conference. Remi reveals that Logan was a doctor but he claims to have just been at the conference as catering staff. Karl Kennedy (Alan Fletcher) becomes suspicious when Logan tells him he is from two separate locations during different conversations.

Logan and Aaron continue to spend time together socialising. When Aaron donates David's clothing to charity, Logan purchases it and becomes emotional when he tries on David's shirt. Melanie steals Logan's caravan keys and finds David's belongings. Logan catches her and she demands to know the truth. Logan claims he is keeping David's belongings should Aaron regret giving them away. He quits his job at Drinks Divas and tells Aaron what he has done. Aaron believes Logan and berates Melanie for not trusting Logan. Remi discovers that Logan worked at the same hospital as David and his brother Leo Tanaka (Tim Kano) reveals that Logan developed an obsession with David. He adds that David reported Logan to the university for harassment and Melanie tells Aaron about Logan's lies. Aaron confronts Logan but he becomes emotional and explains that he genuinely loved David. Aaron continues to spend time with Logan and they bond over their shared grief, they later kiss and have sex. Melanie and Nicolette Stone (Hannah Monson) are angry that Logan is still seeing Aaron and convinces him to leave Erinsborough. Logan later contacts Aaron and reveals that a former partner has been diagnosed with Hepatitis B and they both may have contracted it.

== Quinn Lao ==
Quinn Lao
- Neighbours character
- Portrayed by: Louis Lè
- First appearance: 1 July 2024
- Last appearance: 16 October 2024
- Introduced by: Jason Herbison
In-universe information
- Occupation: Student

Quinn Lao, played by Louis Lè, made his first appearance on 1 July 2024. The character and Lè's casting were announced by Daniel Kilkelly from Digital Spy. Quinn had previously been previewed in a video post via Neighbours' social media channels, in which Shiv Palekar in character as Haz Devkar, previewed cryptic hints about future storylines. In the video, he alluded to Wendy Rodwell (Candice Leask) cosying up to Quinn, questioning her loyalty to her husband Andrew Rodwell (Lloyd Will). Kilkelly added that Quinn is a new friend of Wendy's, who she meets when she begins studying at university. Advance spoiler photographs showcased Wendy and Quinn drinking alcohol in party scenes.

Writers developed the story further by Quinn and Wendy developing a friendship that results in an intimate moment. Wendy informs about the incident and it creates problems for their marriage. In August 2024, scenes depicted Quinn and Andrew feuding over Wendy. Quinn attends Cara Varga-Murphy's (Sara West) birthday party, which angers Andrew. A Neighbours publicist told Sarah Ellis from Inside Soap that "Andrew can't believe he has the nerve to show his face, and as Quinn tries to integrate with the neighbours, Andrew confronts him." They added that Andrew wants to know why Quinn "is sniffing around his wife" and a confrontation ensues between the pair in front of the party guests. Ellis later reported that Quinn and Wendy would betray Andrew's trust again when they become embroiled in a gun hostage situation at The Waterhole.

Quinn attends Eden Hills University and his friend, Parker Reed (Gaz Dutlow) introduces him to his new friend, Wendy. Quinn and Wendy get drunk together and go out clubbing. The following day, Quinn asks Wendy to go out drinking again and she agrees. Parker organises a traffic light party, but the original host cancels and Wendy agrees to hold the party at her house. Quinn and Parker helps Wendy organise the party and Quinn is confused when Wendy does not wear green. He assumes she is single and they get drunk. He propositions Wendy for sex but her daughter Sadie Rodwell (Emerald Chan) and Andrew arrive home. Quinn is shocked that Wendy his her family from him and apologises for propositioning her. They later talk at university and agree to remain friends. Wendy gets an important role at university but Heidi Runnels (Whitney Duff) accuses her of receiving it because of her ethnicity. Wendy confides her feelings to Quinn and they bond over their shared experiences of racism. Quinn attends Wendy's award ceremony and acceptance speech, where he supports her for choosing not to confront the university. Sadie notices that Quinn and Wendy are getting close and she asks Wendy about the situation. Quinn goes to The Waterhole to visit Wendy and complain about his family visiting. He offers to work a shift for Wendy when a staff member calls in sick. He and Wendy continue to have conversations about their ethnicity and experiences, leading to an intense moment between them and she asks Quinn to leave. Sadie begins to worry about Quinn and Wendy's friendship and tells Andrew. He confronts Wendy, who admits Quinn has feelings for her.

Quinn attends a party at Wendy's but Andrew confronts him and he leaves. Wendy then informs Quinn that they can no longer spend time together. Quinn's family order him to change university courses and he contacts Wendy for support. Wendy tries to ignore Quinn, but she eventually agrees to meet. Byron Stone (Xavier Molyneux) witnesses their interaction and tells Sadie she saw them hugging. Andrew confronts Wendy who explains she told Quinn they can no longer be friends. Quinn visits Wendy at the Waterhole but Wendy takes Quinn into the office so they will not be seen. Justin Ashton (Richard Sutherland) takes various people hostage in The Waterhole and Quinn and Wendy hide in the office the entire night. Quinn makes noise causing Justin to discover his presence. Wendy screams after Quinn, causing Andrew to realise she has betrayed him again. The police release all hostages and Quinn is distressed after the incident but Andrew refuses to interview him.

== Rhett Norman ==
Rhett Norman
- Neighbours character
- Portrayed by: Liam Maguire
- First appearance: 18 July 2024
- Last appearance: 11 December 2025
- Introduced by: Jason Herbison
In-universe information
- Occupation: Estate agent

Rhett Norman, played by Liam Maguire, made his first appearance on 18 July 2024. Rhett initially appears as a real estate agent hired by Toadie Rebecchi (Ryan Moloney) to manage the tenancy of his business, Sonya's Nursery. Maguire continued filming as Rhett and reappears in October 2024. Sam Warner from Digital Spy reported that writers were making Rhett a potential love interest for Aaron Brennan (Matt Wilson). When Aaron struggles to find a final dancer for his dance troupe, Boylesque - he enlists Leo Tanaka's (Tim Kano) help and they ask Rhett. He agrees but takes an interest in Aaron, which Leo informs Aaron about. Warner added that Rhett's romantic interest becomes apparent once he begins rehearsing with Aaron. In a backstage video, Maguire revealed that he was "incredibly excited" to be in the storyline. Though he was "a little bit nervous" of the choreography, adding "I'm not much of a dancer." Chloe Timms from Inside Soap revealed that Rhett would romantically pursue Aaron but is initially rejected. Timms added that Aaron is reluctant because of his experiences with his previous love interest, Logan Shembri (Matthew Backer).

Rhett was written out of Neighbours as part of Aaron's departure storyline following Wilson's exit from the series. Their departure scenes were broadcast in September 2025. They feature Rhett and Aaron moving to Adelaide. Maguire and Wilson reprised their roles for the show's final episodes.

Rhett secures Toadie as a client and informs him that his business, Sonya's Nursery is no longer viable for potential tenants and advices him to close it permanently. Rhett later joins a clean up of the nursery and asks Terese Willis (Rebekah Elmaloglou) to convince Toadie to consider changing the purpose of the property. Toadie reacts badly to Rhett and Terese's plans and orders everyone to leave. Rhett spills coffee over his shirt and unbuttons it to prevent scalding. Aaron and Leo witness the incident and ask him to join their dance troupe. He agrees on the condition that Aaron teaches him the choreography. When Aaron struggles with a leg injury, Rhett gives him a massage, which Aaron's friends interpret as romantic interest on Rhett's behalf. Rhett takes part in the Boylesque and after the show he asks Aaron on a date but he refuses. Aaron presumes Rhett is following him when he attends the same house party as him, unaware that Nicolette Stone (Hannah Monson) invited him. They begin to get along better and becomes friends. Aaron decides he wants to begin dating and asks Rhett out. They go on their first date in the city and Rhett helps Aaron collect parcels for Yasmine Shields (Chrishell Stause). Aaron mentions his dead husband, David Tanaka (Takaya Honda) numerous times and Rhett is understanding.

They arrange another date and Rhett later attends Leo and Krista Sinclair's (Majella Davis) engagement party. Rhett becomes emotional when he witnesses Aaron with his daughter, Isla Tanaka-Brennan (Hana Abe-Tucker). Rhett reveals that he has a daughter also but the mother moved away and ceased contact with Rhett. He reveals that witnessing Aaron with Isla made him realise he is missing out on being a father. Aaron responds by kissing Rhett and beginning a relationship with him. Aaron begins to feel guilty about being with Rhett and on the anniversary of David's death, he breaks-up with Rhett. Aaron later changes his mind and asks Rhett for another chance. He disappointed when Rhett reveals he has a new boyfriend, Patrick Hayes (Wesley Forke) and Rhett apologises to Aaron for moving on quickly.

== Heath Royce ==
Heath Royce
- Neighbours character
- Portrayed by: Ethan Panizza
- First appearance: 31 July 2024
- Last appearance: 9 December 2024
- Introduced by: Jason Herbison
In-universe information
- Other names: Heath Silverson
- Occupation: Business assistant
- Sisters: Yasmine Shields

Heath Royce, played by Ethan Panizza, made his first appearance on 31 July 2024. The character was announced on 1 July 2024 and with limited information provided. A promotional photograph of Heath revealed that he will share stories with Tess Carmichael (Anica Calida). Daniel Kilkelly from Digital Spy described Heath as "a handsome newcomer" and would also gain an admirer in Holly Hoyland (Lucinda Armstrong Hall). Of the embargoed plot, Kilkelly added "more details about Tess' return storyline and the involvement of newcomer Heath will be revealed in the coming weeks." Heath was involved in the show's "Death in the Outback" storyline, presenting a danger for Holly when they embark on a holiday together. Heath was killed on 22 August; the character was eaten by a crocodile after Holly pushed him into a creek.

Heath arrives at Lassiters hotel to visit Tess, where she reveals they worked closely together in the US. When alone, the duo discuss their plans to con Lassiter's and leave the company together and gain revenge on Reece Sinclair (Micha Barton) for forcing Tess to take a job overseas. He and Tess rent a holiday home and he hires a sports car. Heath shows an attraction to Holly and she responds by getting into his car for a ride. He takes her to his rental mansion, telling her he lives there by himself, and they have sex. Heath gets advice from local lawyer Toadie Rebecchi (Ryan Moloney), calling himself Heath Silverson, about buying a property in Maui. Tess becomes concerned that it will raise suspicion and asks Heath to cancel the deal. He is forced to make up a story about his name after Mackenzie Hargreaves (Georgie Stone) realizes he is using two different surnames. He later confronts her and attempts to intimidate her. Sadie Rodwell (Emerald Chan) catches Heath kissing Tess and informs Holly. Holly questions him, but he tells her that he will end things with Tess soon, and they continue to see each other behind Tess's back.

Tess orders Heath to go to Mount Harper in Outback Australia where there is another Sinclair investment, and he secretly takes Holly with him. He is confronted by Mackenzie before leaving, but he tells her to back away from Holly's personal life. After Mackenzie tells Toadie and Melanie Pearson (Lucinda Cowden) about his behavior, they go to his house and discover his fake passport, before being taken hostage by Justin Ashton (Richard Sutherland). Holly's parents Karl (Alan Fletcher) and Susan Kennedy (Jackie Woodburne) begin to worry as she stops answering their phone calls, which is really because Heath threw it into a nearby river without her knowing. Heath begins to become aggressive towards Holly which concerns her, and she discovers his journal with all of his and Tess's plans. Tess orders Heath to go and check on Toadie and Melanie, who are tied up in a shack nearby after being sent on they train to the outback by Justin. Holly tries to get help on Heath's phone, but he catches her. Heath packs up and leaves the next morning, unaware that Holly is hiding in the back of his ute. After Toadie and Melanie break free, Holly does her best to distract Heath, but he becomes angry when she treis to run away. He pushes her into a tank of corn, and retrieves a rifle from under the shack, before going searching for Toadie and Melanie. Heath meets up with Tess, who begins to feel remorseful about what they had done. Heath is then called by Paul Robinson (Stefan Dennis), who bribes him with money to see if Holly, Toadie and Melanie are safe. He chases down Melanie and Holly after she rescued her. They are spotted by Mackenzie and Haz Devkar (Shiv Palekar), after they flew to the outback in search for Holly. Heath locked Tess in the back of his ute, but she was rescued by Mackenzie. He chases Holly and Melanie to the river with a gun and begins firing shots, before Holly comes up behind him and pushes him into the water. Heath is then attacked and killed by a crocodile. Four months later, Heath's sister Yasmine Shields (Chrishell Stause) recovers a video message from Heath to her, which suggests Holly has put him in danger while in the Outback.

== Max Ramsay ==
Max Ramsay
- Neighbours character
- Portrayed by: Ben Jackson
- Duration: 2024–2025
- First appearance: 12 November 2024
- Last appearance: 11 December 2025
- Introduced by: Jason Herbison
In-universe information
- Occupation: Hotel assistant; Garage manager; Apprentice mechanic
- Family: Ramsay
- Father: Shane Ramsay
- Mother: Yvette Ramsay
- Sisters: Saskia Ramsay
- Grandfathers: Max Ramsay
- Grandmothers: Maria Ramsay
- Uncles: Danny Ramsay
- Aunts: Jill Ramsay
- Other relatives: Dan Ramsay; Tom Ramsay; Madge Bishop; Charlene Robinson; Henry Ramsay; Agnes Adair

Max Ramsay, played by Ben Jackson, made his first appearance on 12 November 2024. Max was introduced as a new member of the Ramsay family, one of the series' original families. The character and casting were announced on 1 October 2024 on the official Neighbours Instagram account, where they accompanied a picture of Jackson with the caption, "After 10 years, a Ramsay is back on Ramsay Street! We're thrilled to announce that Ben Jackson will soon be joining the cast as Max Ramsay. But what's brought a member of the show's original family back to Erinsborough? All will be revealed..." Neighbours later released another photo which revealed that Max is the son of original character Shane Ramsay (Peter O'Brien), who had previously appeared on the soap between 1985 and 1987 and in 2022. It was also announced that O'Brien had reprised the role and would be returning to the soap for a "visit". Susannah Alexander from Digital Spy questioned whether Shane and Max's relationship would be "harmonious". For his portrayal of Max, Jackson was nominated in the "Soaps - Best New Casting" category at the 2025 Digital Spy Reader Awards.

Max accidentally pushes Holly Hoyland (Lucinda Armstrong-Hall) into the pond and she confronts him with Byron Stone (Xavier Molyneux). Vera Punt (Sally-Ann Upton) allows Max to move into number 32 Ramsay Street, which annoys fellow housemate Byron. Shane convinces Paul Robinson (Stefan Dennis) to give Max an executive assistant job at Lassiters Hotel. Max tells Krista Sinclair (Majella Davis) that Shane is forcing him to work in hospitality and he wants to be a mechanic. Krista ends Max's employment. Shane later buys the garage, Fitzgerald Motors, so Max can complete his mechanics apprenticeship. Shane tells Max to keep his reason for moving towns a secret from everyone. Shane leaves and asks his friends to watch over Max. It is later revealed that Max has fled Brisbane after targeting a member of a gangster family who spiked the drink of a friend.

Max flirts with Byron's girlfriend Sadie Rodwell (Emerald Chan) and later tells her that he likes her, which makes her extremely uncomfortable, but keeps it quiet in order to not make things awkward at home. Max tries to build a good friendship with his housemates by inviting Byron and Sadie to a concert, which Byron gladly accepts. Sadie later confronts him and tells him to cancel the tickets for her and Byron, but he ignores her request and buys the tickets anyway. Byron later overhears them talking about Max's confession. Sadie and Byron ask Max to move out of the share house, and he begins looking for nearby rentals. Max talks badly about Vera behind her back, which she overhears and becomes deeply upset. He comes home to find Vera alone on Christmas and apologizes to her, and buys her lunch. Max jumps in front of Sadie after she and Sebastian Metcalfe (Rarmian Newton) are charged at by a car, and the three of them are hit.

Max later dates Holly Hoyland who cheats on him with her best friend Sadie Rodwell's father Andrew (Lloyd Will). Holly dumps Max without explanation, leaving him hurt and confused. After Holly realises she is pregnant by Andrew, she briefly allows Max to believe he is the father, a role which he gladly accepts. He is devastated to learn the truth, though Max and Holly eventually make their peace.

== Sebastian Metcalfe ==
Sebastian Metcalfe
- Neighbours character
- Portrayed by: Rarmian Newton
- Duration: 2024–2025
- First appearance: 19 November 2024
- Last appearance: 15 April 2025
- Introduced by: Jason Herbison
In-universe information
- Occupation: Waiter

Sebastian Metcalfe, played by Rarmian Newton, made his first appearance on 19 November 2024. Newton's casting was announced on 7 October 2024 via the official Neighbours Instagram account. Sebastian is connected to the established character Krista Sinclair (Majella Davis). A publicist revealed "his presence is set to send shockwaves through Erinsborough for a long time to come..." Of his casting, Newton stated he had "so much love and respect" for Neighbours but viewers should "stay tuned" because "it won't look that way" once Sebastian debuts.

Sebastian uses Yorokobi to host a party and he leaves without paying the owner Leo Tanaka (Tim Kano). He obtains a photograph of Sebastian and Krista steals it and pays the money Sebastian owes anonymously to Leo. Sebastian arrives at Krista's home and she agrees to let him stay. Byron Stone (Xavier Molyneux) witnesses Sebastian with a suspected drug dealer and informs Leo. He confronts Sebastian, who warns Leo that Krista does not appreciate boyfriends who cannot handle their friendship. Sebastian continues to party but promises Krista he will stop. He then goes out and gets drunk, which annoys Krista when he refuses to leave a nightclub. Sebastian is approached by Joe Julians, who begins threatening him. Byron protects him but Joe returns the following day to threaten him. Sebastian tells Leo that Joe is a loan shark after repayment. Leo threatens Sebastian to leave or he will ruin his life, so Sebastian leaves. He later contacts Krista asking for money in order to pay off all his debts to loan sharks, which she reluctantly hands over. Sebastian asks her for more money, which she doesn't immediately give him. He is later spotted by Paul Robinson (Stefan Dennis) at the Waterhole, who tells him that Leo has gone looking for him, which Sebastian reveals is extremely dangerous. Sebastian goes to see Krista and asks for more money, and she hands it over to him on the condition that he go away and never see her again. He leaves and stays in a shed on Power road nearby. Sebastian is later seen in the shed by Dex Varga-Murphy (Marley Williams) who tells Leo of his whereabouts. Sebastian later drops some cash on the road which Sadie Rodwell (Emerald Chan) picks up for him, before a car charges at them and runs them down.

Byron finds Sebastian unconscious and he is rushed to hospital with a fractured collarbone. Leo and Krista meet him at the hospital and Stevie Hart (Jazz Bell) tells Krista that they found photos of Sebastian on the attacker's phone. She later finds out that he handed back to money she had given him. Leo suggests that Sebastian stays at Lassiters hotel under a fake name, which he agrees to. He found it difficult to be alone and began leaning on Krista, which annoyed Leo, leading him to suggest that Sebastian go to rehab but he refuses. Krista eventually allows him to stay in her apartment. Krista cancels her date with Leo after Sebastian overdosed on his pain killers. She later asks Nicolette Stone (Hannah Monson) if she would give him a job at Harold's Café, and she agrees. Krista convinces him to go to an NA meeting, where he admits to a woman there that he is falling in love with Krista. Paul throws Leo and Krista an engagement party, and arranges the time so that Sebastian can't be there. He instead makes Krista some pastries in the café kitchen, and she closes the fridge door on his broken arm accidentally. Sebastian later confesses his love for Krista and kisses her. She orders him to leave and go to rehab in Sydney. Before he leaves, he meets with Fallon Morrell (Kate Connick), who is Krista's half-sister and Sebastian's ex-girlfriend. She reveals that Sebastian hurt her by leaving to pursue Krista.

Fallon begins scheming to break Krista and Leo up and invites Sebastian back to Melbourne to help her plan. Sebastian pretends to be sober but Krista refuses to meet with him. He gets drunk which annoys Fallon and orders him to stop drinking. She later orchestrates a meeting with Krista and lies to Leo, which makes him attack Sebastian upon seeing him. Fallon lies to Krista that she has had sex with Leo and Krista responds by having sex with Sebastian. Fallon reveals the truth about their scheming the following day and she orders them to leave. Sebastian tries to ruin their Krista and Leo's wedding but Fallon and Taye Obasi (Lakota Johnson) prevent him from doing so. Fallon orders Sebastian to leave Erinsborough before Krista returns from her honeymoon. Krista tells the truth to Leo and he returns home alone. Leo finds Sebastian drunk at the lake and they have a physical altercation. Sebastian's dead body is seen floating in Lassiter's lake the following morning. Sebastian's body is removed from the lake as Krista, Leo and Fallon watch from the lakeside. Sebastian is later seen arguing with Fallon on camara footage. It is later revealed that Sebastian is killed by Nell Rebecchi (Ayisha Salem-Towner), when she pushed him in self defense after he grabs her thinking she's Fallon.

== Yasmine Shields ==
Yasmine Shields
- Neighbours character
- Portrayed by: Chrishell Stause
- Duration: 2024–2025
- First appearance: 28 November 2024
- Last appearance: 20 January 2025
- Introduced by: Jason Herbison
In-universe information
- Other names: Yaz
- Occupation: Lighting director
- Brothers: Heath Royce

Yasmine "Yaz" Shields, played by Chrishell Stause, made her first appearance on 28 November 2024. The character and Stause's casting was announced on 29 May 2024. Stause began filming her guest role in July 2024. The serial's executive producer Jason Herbison revealed Stause's character was specifically created for her. Of her casting, the actress stated: "I am honored and excited to join such a beloved and iconic show! Coming from the world of soaps in the US, it’s back to my first love in the entertainment industry. They pitched me an idea for a character, and I was immediately excited to figure out a way to make it happen. Ramsay Street, here I come." Yaz comes to Erinsborough with a business opportunity for some of the established characters. Herbison told viewers to "expect intrigue and surprises – and many implications for the residents of Ramsay Street."

It was later revealed that Yasmine would be introduced as the sister of former character, Heath Royce (Ethan Panizza), who had been killed on-screen months earlier. Her introductory story features Yasmine arriving to pitch a light show concept to the local community. It soon becomes apparent that Yasmine is actually out for revenge and targeting Holly Hoyland (Lucinda Armstrong Hall), who she blames for Heath's death.

Yaz walks through Lassiters complex and Paul Robinson (Stefan Dennis) offers her help. She meets Helen Brown (Emma Choy) and Aaron Brennan (Matt Wilson) at the Waterhole, and reveals her plans to put on a big lighting show in Erinsborough, and Aaron suggests she pitch it to Lassiters hotel co-manager Krista Sinclair (Majella Davis). She also pitches to Erinsborough High school principal Jane Harris (Annie Jones) and retirement complex manager Susan Kennedy (Jackie Woodburne) who approve of the project. She later listens to the Crimesborough podcast episode regarding the death of Heath at the hands of Holly in the outback, before pulling up a photo of her and Heath. Yaz asks Crimesborough host Blaze Sagante (Stefanie Jones) about her opinion on what happened between Heath and Holly. She later coaxes Holly into her room after she comes to deliver room service.

== Others ==
Date(s)	Character	Actor	Circumstances
8 January–13 January 2025	Helen Brown	Emma Choy	Helen is the mayor and works for the council. She meets with Jane Harris and Terese Willis to discuss the proposals for Eirini Rising. Helen later gives Haz Devkar an award for his coffee shop. She later meets with Yasmine Shields who pitches her light show concept to her. She later meets with Terese and Paul Robinson to discuss his potential plans to redevelop Power Road, but Terese talks her out of accepting his proposal.
22 January	Max Gavalas	Jethro Cassar	Max is the son of Alyssa Gavalas. He arrives with her to collect his lost dog Trevor/Bodie from Haz Devkar.
24 January	George Gavalas	Phil Hayden	George is the husband of Alyssa Gavalas. He meets with Mackenzie Hargreaves at The Waterhole to discuss the ownership of his family dog, Trevor/Bodie, who Haz Devkar had rescued and rehomed. George tells Mackenzie that Trevor is homesick and his family want to return the dog to Haz.
25–30 January	Santo Oliveira	David Serafin	Santo is a fruit supplier who provides stock for Melanie Pearson's drinks business. He delivers a fruit order to Melanie and he reveals he recently divorced his wife. Melanie asks Santo out on a date. They go out to dinner together, but their date is awkward. Santo and Melanie kiss but decide to remain friends. Melanie tells Terese Willis that she and Santo are now dating. Santo later meets up and goes out on a date with Vera Punt, where the two are spotted by Terese, who sees Santo giving Vera flowers. Serafin previously played Dennis Dimato on Neighbours from 2015 to 2016.
27 February	Dinuka Ilangamage	Colin Masters	Dinuka is a fellow inmate in prison with Felix Rodwell. He asks Felix why he is not more excited about the prospect of parole.
13 March–17 April	Jools Halliday	Eva Seymour	Jools is Felix Rodwell's girlfriend who he met prior to being sent to prison. Felix reveals Jools continued to support him whilst he was incarcerated. Felix informs Jools of his plan to stage a robbery at the Eirini Rising construction site, and his discovery that JJ Varga-Murphy is likely to be his biological son. Jools attends Felix's welcome party and she gets to know the residents of Ramsay Street. Jools befriends Holly Hoyland because they are wearing the same dress. She later hears Holly asking Felix for a date and she confronts Holly. Jools picks up some cake and smears it into Holly's hair. Jools then discusses the robbery with Felix but JJ overhears. When Felix commits the robbery he arranges to meet Jools so they can abscond together. The police arrive at Jools' flat and force her to lead them to Felix and arrest him. She later agrees to meet with JJ, who she tells of Felix's motivation to escape fatherhood and encourages to let go of any idea of a relationship with him.
18 March	Emily Verhagen	Liza Meagher	Emily is a nurse at Erinsborough Hospital who performs an ultrasound on Krista Sinclair and informs her she is having a girl.
27 March	Casey Dzesa	Georgia Barron	Casey arrives at Harold's Café to install security cameras following a request made by Mackenzie Hargreaves. The café manager Haz Devkar tells Casey he is not interested and sends her away.
1 April–11 September 2025	Jasmine Stewart	Frankie Mazzone	A student at Erinsborough High School and Nell Rebecchi's best friend, first seen when she shows Dex Varga-Murphy a video depicting Jane Harris in a provocative situation. She later speaks to Nell in the school corridor about Nell's stepmother, Terese Willis, before placing the master key between the school and Eirini Rising in her locker. Soon after, JJ Varga-Murphy confronts Jasmine about her new jacket after noticing a fraudulent purchase from Moira Tohu's credit card matches its brand. JJ approaches Jasmine's sister to get the stolen items back, and after he is caught returning them Nell convinces Jasmine to confess her guilt. Later, Jasmine begins to make amends by helping the Italian-speaking Elenora Santoro communicate with the Eirini Rising staff. Jasmine attends Nell's sixteenth birthday party at the end of the year, and helps with Erinsborough High's contribution to the Lights Up event. She attends Nell's leaving party before she moves to Colac.
2 April	Charlie Braun	Luca Demicoli	A student at Erinsborough High School, who makes reference to the video of Jane Harris, to the amusement of the other students, when she is covering his lesson.
8 April	Officer Ava Lagney	Angela Johnson	Police Officer Ava Lagney arrests Felix Rodwell for committing a robbery at the Eirini Rising building site.
15 April	Selby Strain	Alexandra Cornish	Selby visits Terese Willis' house to take promotional photographs of Karl Kennedy for the publicity campaign for Eirini Rising.
15 April	Miles Wilcox	Victor Gralak	Miles is interviewed by Terese Willis for the job of project manager at Eirini Rising. Paul Robinson informs Terese that Miles is unsuitable for the role.
18 April	PrOxxy	Maximillian Johnson	PrOxxy is an old friend of Haz Devkar, who arranges to meet with PrOxxy in Erinsborough to confront him over a hacking scandal. Haz accuses PrOxxy of being the hacker but he assues Haz he is not. PrOxxy goes to Haz's house to attempt to locate the actual hacker, but leaves abruptly, telling Haz to have no further contact with him.
25 April	Tony Teeling	Jim Daly	Tony attends a promotional event for the Eirini Rising development. He mocks guest speaker Karl Kennedy about him supposedly being the culprit of public defecation crimes in Erinsborough.
29 April–13 June, 28 October 2025	Shannon Rutherford	Grace Quealy	Shannon is a drug dealer who visits The Waterhole to supply Krista Sinclair with drugs. Shannon later hassles Krista and tries to tempt her with more drugs. Leo Tanaka witnesses the incident and tells Shannon to leave Krista alone. He later stops Shannon from hassling Krista again. Shannon tries to offer Krista drugs again and Krista threatens her. Shannon drops a supply of drugs and Leo's daughter Abigail Tanaka finds them. Leo later arranges a meeting with Shannon and threatens her for endangering his daughter's health. A bottle of wine belonging to Leo's vineyard business is poisoned. Shannon is pictured in car dash cam footage placing her at the vineyard before the crime occurred. Shannon is arrested but pleads her innocence. She is charged with trespass but they fail to gain enough evidence to charge her with the poisoning. She is later confronted by Holly Hoyland, who is looking for information on the poisoning, before being ordered to leave by Krista. The following year, Krista contacts Shannon pretending to want drugs, to get her to meet with her daughter Addison Ruthford, who has been staying with Krista. She later messages Krista and tells her she won't come for Addison.
15–28 May	Matty Yeo	Sean Yuen Halley	Matty is a member of the YAHMIL cycling group who meet Karl Kennedy and Aaron Brennan while cycling. Karl presumes they are laughing at him about the mystery public defecator rumour, but Matty reveals Karl's bike helmet amused them. Karl asks to join YAHMIL. Matty reveals it is an acronym of "young and hot men in lycra", an under the age of forty only group and therefore Karl cannot join. Aaron later asks Matty if he can join YAHMIL and goes on a ride with them. Matty attends another bike ride with Aaron, Phil Raymond and Jacob Burchmore.
15 May	Tim Duffy	Jack Beran	Tim is a customer at Harold's Cafe who informs Holly Hoyland that he likes sandwiches but not gluten free ones because they make him ill.
20 May–5 June	Shirley Burchmore	Suzy Cato-Gashler	Shirley is a rich widow who attends a tour for the Eirini Rising development, with the interest in buying a property and influencing her friends to do the same. Owner Terese Willis is nervous and wants to make a sale to Shirley. Shirley wants to meet doctor Karl Kennedy, who will be working as the complex's doctor, but he is unavailable. Terese asks Susan Kennedy to show Shirley around, but she is not happy when Susan will not give her choice of décor. Toadie Rebecchi steps in and offers Shirley and her friends free legal services should she buy in. At the opening, Shirley learns that her grandson, Jacob Burchmore, is responsible for a spate of public defecations, and tells Karl that she will not buy into the complex if his actions become public knowledge. Shirley buys Karl a new bicycle to bribe him and she buys a property. When Jacob is arrested for public defecation she accuses Karl of breaking their deal and takes the bicycle back.
20–28 May	Phil Raymond	Billy Bentley	Phil is a member of the YAHMIL cycling group. Aaron Brennan joins the group to help Karl Kennedy discover who the local mystery defecator is. Aaron reveals Phil could be the culprit because he lagged behind the group claiming his bike was faulty. Phil attends another bike ride with Matty Yeo, Aaron and Jacob.
20 May–5 June	Jacob Burchmore	Sam Ludeman	Jacob is a member of the YAHMIL cycling group and is seen alongside group leader Matty Yeo welcoming Aaron Brennan to the group. Aaron is secretly trying to help Karl Kennedy discover who the local mystery defecator is. Aaron talks to Jacob, who reveals he cycles with the YAHMIL group weekly. When Aaron joins the group on a ride, he discovers Jacob defecating on the side of the road and takes a photograph of him. Jacob then attends the Eirini Rising opening with his grandmother, Shirley Burchmore, where Karl confronts him with the evidence of his actions. Shirley bribes Karl to keep quiet but he tells Mackenzie Hargreaves, who tells her lawyer friend, who then reports Jacob to the police. Mackenzie explains that her friend was facing Jacob in a court case and wanted to discredit him. Jacob is charged with public indecency.
5 June 2024 – 6 June 2025	Cst. Jamie Neyland	Angela Johnson	Police constable Jamie Neyland arrests Jacob Burchmore for defecating in public. Wendy Rodwell visits the police station to visit her husband, Andrew Rodwell. Jamie tells Wendy that Andrew is working at Lassiters Hotel. Jamie later interviews victims of a hostage situation at The Waterhole. Andrew asks Jamie to interview Quinn Lao when he cannot face him. Jamie becomes awkward on shift with Andrew and reveals it is because he has enquired about a new police job in Murrayville.
10 June–29 August	Felicity Bosman	Effie Nkrumah	Felicity arrives on Ramsay Street to visit her best friend, Remi Varga-Murphy. Felicity reveals that Remi's wife, Cara Varga-Murphy, was worried and wanted her to check up on her. Felicity gives Remi a new hairstyle before leaving. Later in the year, Felicity attends Cara's fortieth birthday party.
11–26 June	Liv Bellen	Cece Peters	Liv is a podcast host who reports on the poisoning case that occurred at Eirini Rising and left Dex Varga-Murphy in hospital. Holly Hoyland leaks information to Liv over an internet forum and she reports that Leo Tanaka withheld the poisoned wine bottle from police. Holly meets with Liv and tries to bribe her to retract her comments, but Liv records a new podcast about Holly's bribery. Holly later suspects Liv of carrying out the poisoning and believes she has gathered evidence to use against her. She confronts Liv, causing and altercation in which Holly sprays hairspray into Liv's eyes. Liv attempts to press criminal charges against Holly. Krista Sinclair intervenes and threatens to bring a defamation lawsuit against her podcast if she does not drop the charges. Liv complies with Krista's request and changes her statement to the police. Liv later interviews Gavin Bowman for the podcast regarding medical information about the poisonings. Holly asks Liv for more information but Liv tells Holly she will call the police if she does not leave her alone.
13 June–23 July	Brett Heade	Brad Angel	The acting manager of Lassiters Hotel while Paul Robinson is visiting family in New York. Holly Hoyland sees Brett leaving the hotel to play golf, which he tells her constitutes a business meeting. He later agrees to let Nicolette Stone run a furniture market in the hotel carpark, unaware that events manager Krista Sinclair needs the space for an event. She orders Brett to shut down the store immediately. After Brett's negligence causes a further incident at the hotel, Krista fires him.
17 June	Adam Loh	Thomas Fitzgerald	Adam is a delivery man who drops off a parcel at Eirini Rising. He speaks to Susan Kennedy and mistakes her for a resident.
19 June	Erin Chong	Irene Chen	Erin owns a restaurant where a second poisoning occurs in the local area. Holly Hoyland visits Erin, posing as council worker Mackenzie Hargreaves. Holly asks Erin to give her to CCTV footage to review, wanting to find the identity of the poisoner. Erin reports Holly to the council, prompting Mackenzie to arrive. Erin realises they are lying and orders them both to leave.
25 June 2024–5 November 2025	Moira Tohu	Robyn Arthur	Moira is a resident at Eirini Rising is alarmed when she realises there have been unauthorised purchases made using her credit card. She tells the owner, Terese Willis and blames the neighbouring students. She requests money to compensate her loses. The following month, Moira requests that Susan Kennedy locates her missing hat. She later walks in on Susan in Karl Kennedy's office, and is shocked to find her naked and wearing her missing hat. Moira begins a boycott against Krista Sinclair's planned event featuring male dancer. Spurred on by Hilary Robinson, she makes it clear that they will try and stop the event going ahead. Moira tells Gino Esposito that she will contact the police after a bottle of wine is stolen from her drinks delivery, unaware that Terese has stolen it. Moira and Gino attend a wood carving event and she complains to Terese about her missing wine. Terese tells Moira to forget about it and she is later caught up in a gas leak caused by Terese. Moira and other residents decide to raise lawsuits against Eirini Rising. Harold Bishop talks with Moira and discovers that she is pursuing legal action out of loneliness. He convinces her to drop the action. Hilary discovers that Terese is planning to work from home and informs Moira. She then informs Terese that they will pursue legal action with the help of Tim Collins if she does not resign and Terese agrees. Moira and Gino later gather a meeting to discuss the theme of a light show proposal by Yasmine Shields. Toadie Rebecchi helps them decide to focus it on people they loved that have died. Moira later attends a meeting regarding Terese's reinstatement as Eirini Rising manager. Moira initially fights against her return but eventually changes her decision and the residents vote Terese back in. When Vera Punt moves into Eirini Rising she strikes up a rivalry with Moira, which intensifies when they fight over the affections of new resident Monte Jones. They eventually realise that their friendship is more important than romance.
27 June–7 August	Parker Reed	Gaz Dutlow	Parker is a university student who Wendy Rodwell befriends. Wendy gives them jewellery and Parker apologises for not speaking to her sooner. Parker and Wendy go on a night out drinking alcohol. They later attend the party at Wendy's house. When Parker discovers that Wendy has lied about her age and having a family, they reassure her that her new friends will still accept her. Parker goes for drinks with Wendy and her husband Andrew Rodwell. Parker later attends Wendy's mentorship award acceptance ceremony.
4 July	Elenora Santoro	Gianna Affinita	An Eirini Rising resident, who speaks Italian and struggles to communicate with the staff following the death of her husband. At an event between residents and Erinsborough High School students, Elenora has trouble ordering her coffee and is helped by Jasmine Stewart.
4 July	Mr Johnson	John Hiller	An Eirini Rising resident, who attends an event with Erinsborough High School students but falls asleep.
23 July	Doug Baldree	Adrian Jarrett	Doug is a critic from a travel review company and arrives at Lassiters to write about his stay. Numerous issues arise due to the poor management of Brett Heade. Doug tells Krista Sinclair that he is leaving and criticises the hotel.
23 July	Receptionist	Kayla McCullouch	A receptionist working at Lassiters Hotel, who walks into Holly Hoyland and spills food onto Krista Sinclair.
30 July	Heidi Runnels	Whitney Duff	Heidi attends Eden Hills University and is annoyed when Wendy Rodwell wins the mentorship programme. Heidi tells Wendy that she only received the role because it was a stunt to promote diversity. Cara Varga-Murphy defends Wendy and accuses Heidi of racism.
5 August–26 September	Justin Ashton	Richard Sutherland	Justin meets with Tess Carmichael to discuss a secret job she wants him to do. He travels to the outback to take care of business for Tess. He later finds Toadie Rebecchi and Melanie Pearson snooping in Tess' rental home and kidnaps them. He takes them to a cattle station in the outback, ties them up and travels back to Melbourne. Justin begins threatening Holly Hoyland and stages an armed siege at the Waterhole holding Holly and several of her Neighbours hostage. He is then arrested by Andrew Rodwell
7 August	Edith Jameson	Ana Isabel	Edith works at Eden Hills university and introduces Wendy Rodwell onto the stage to collect her mentorship award.
3 September	Ruth Nicholas	Kelly Nash	Ruth is florist who delivers flowers to Terese Willis at Eirini Rising.
4 September	Leona Meldrum	Chelsea Plumley	Leona works at Eden Hills University and interviews Cara Varga-Murphy about cheating on her assignment. Leona accepts that Cara's son tampered with her assignment and agrees to let her retake it.
4 September	Toni Lorch	Jodi Haigh	Toni works at the hospital and hands over details of Felix Rodwell's admission to Remi Varga-Murphy.
12 September 2024, 14 May 2025	Chester Day	Robert Pham	Chester is a nurse who assesses Felix Rodwell's medical condition at the hospital. Chester later helps to treat Thomas Murphy when he is taken into hospital.
17 September	Sanjeev Devkar	Mark Silveira	Sanjeev and Reena are the parents of Haz Devkar and Amira Devkar. They arrive to attend Haz's wedding to Mackenzie Hargreaves. They get reacquainted with Haz and meet Mackenzie for the first time and stay for the wedding reception.
17 September	Reena Devkar	Camille Gautam	Sanjeev and Reena are the parents of Haz Devkar and Amira Devkar. They arrive to attend Haz's wedding to Mackenzie Hargreaves. They get reacquainted with Haz and meet Mackenzie for the first time and stay for the wedding reception.
17 September	Bowser Jones	John Klotz	Bowser is a former prison inmate who Wade Fernsby instructs to cut the brakes on Haz Devkar and Mackenzie Hargreaves' car. Felix Rodwell notices Bowser and figures out his plan, but Terese Willis drives off in the car and crashes before Felix can intervene.
19 September	Melissa Zhang	Brooke Tomlinson	Melissa is an meditation instructor who runs a class which Wendy Rodwell and Andrew Rodwell attend.
26 September	CIRT Officer Brady	David T Cowell	A CIRT officer who attends an armed siege at The Waterhole.
15 October	Lindsay Walker	Brett Whittingham	Lindsay visits Ramsay Street to purchase a motorbike sold by Jane Harris.
16 October	Craig Pallares	Shaun Goss	Craig is a marriage counsellor who Andrew Rodwell and Wendy Rodwell attend a session with.
17 October	Matt Yan	David Nash	Matt is a landscape gardener who consults Terese Willis about plans to renovate her front garden.
30 October	John Haider	Tristan Sicari	John is a delivery driver who talks to Terese Willis at Eirini Rising, and questions her wellbeing due to her drunken state. After Terese damages a gas meter with her car, John is blamed and loses his job, but is reinstated when Terese confesses.
7 November	Iris Naylor	Miranda Anwar	Iris works for the adoption agency and interviews Aaron Brennan, Nicolette Stone and Jane Harris about Aaron adopting Isla Tanaka-Brennan.
20 November 2024 - 7 April 2025	Jordan Masciulli	Diana Laichyk	Jordan meets with Sebastian Metcalfe, hands him something and Byron Stone assumes a drug deal has taken place. Krista Sinclair later meets with Jordan and pays her for information about Sebastian. Cara Varga-Murphy later suspects Jordan could be involved in Sebastian's murder and takes photos of Jordan Jordan Masciulli and her cronie. They suspect she was taking photos of them and Cara leaves. The following day they presume Cara's wife, Remi Varga-Murphy was taking the photos and confront her. Jordan and three other females drag Remi from her car and attack her.
20 November - 2 December	Blaze Saganté	Stefanie Jones	Blaze is the new host of the Crimesborough podcast and interviews Holly Hoyland about her ordeal in the outback. Blaze manipulates the interview to portray Holly as a villain and possible murderer. Yasmine Shields later asks Blaze about her opinion on what happened in the outback. Holly approaches her and frames her as a manipulator. Blaze later meets with Yasmine Shields who discusses her light show concept with her and discusses Holly with her. Holly argues with Blaze about her betrayal and she tells Holly it was worth it.
26 November	Joe Julians	Rory O'Brien	Joe is a loan shark who threatens Sebastian Metcalfe twice.
27 November	Dr Urma Ackerman	Kali Hulme	A doctor at Erinsborough Hospital who updates Remi Varga-Murphy about the condition of her wife, Cara Varga-Murphy.
2 December	Dr Sameeer Bishara	Malith	Sameer is a locum doctor who comes to work at Eirini Rising while Karl Kennedy is on holiday.
17 December 2024 – 29 April 2025	Pianist	Sandra Webb	A pianist who plays at an open mic carol singing event at Lassiters. She later performs at the venue again the following year.
17 December 2024, 2–24 April 2025	Bradley Hawkings	Lachlan Lewis	Bradley hosts an open mic carol singing event at Lassiters. Bradley also works at Lassiter's inside the hotel and Taye Obasi reveals that Bradley has been using hotel rooms without payment and tampering with CCTV to conceal his deception. Cara Varga-Murphy begins to investigate the staff at Lassiter's and accuses Bradley of taking too many breaks.
19 December	Chips McAlpine	Joshua Jurlina	Chips arrives in Erinsborough looking for Sebastian Metcalfe. He meets Leo Tanaka and claims he is Sebastian's cousin, so Leo tells Chips that Sebastian is staying on Power Road. He then drives his car at speed towards Sebastian and Sadie Rodwell and Max Ramsay jumps in front of the car.
