= Haz Devkar =

- Neighbours character
- Portrayed by: Shiv Palekar
- Duration: 2023–2025
- First appearance: 18 September 2023
- Last appearance: 11 December 2025
- Introduced by: Jason Herbison
In-universe information
- Other names: Hari Devkar
- Occupation: Café Manager; Hacker; Tech worker
- Father: Sanjeev Devkar
- Mother: Reena Devkar
- Sisters: Amira Devkar
- Wife: Mackenzie Hargreaves (2024–)

Hari 'Haz' Devkar is a fictional character from the Australian television soap opera Neighbours, played by Shiv Palekar. He made his first appearance as Haz during the episode broadcast on 18 September 2023. Palekar's casting and Haz's character details were publicised on 7 June 2023. Haz was one of the show's new characters introduced following the show's cancelation and return, following its acquisition by Amazon Freevee. Haz is introduced into the series as the manager of Harold's Café. He lives in a house share concept with Mackenzie Hargreaves (Georgie Stone) and Byron Stone (Xavier Molyneux). They are depicted as good friends and writers made Mackenzie his love interest. Haz also shares screen time with Trevor (Bodhi), a pet Groodle that writers included in many of Haz's initial episodes. Haz is characterised as "a real community person" who values "honesty and justice".

Writers explored romance for Haz via relationships with Billie Alessio (Georgia Walters) and Holly Hoyland (Lucinda Armstrong Hall), the latter forming a love-triangle plot with the involvement of Mackenzie. In 2024, writers united Haz and Mackenzie and explored their relationship. Haz was initially portrayed as a friendly café owner but created a problematic past featuring cyber crime, which was fully utilised in his later story. It explored the impact hacking, AI attacks and deepfakes being inflicted upon his friends and neighbours. Producers introduced Wade Fernsby (Stephen Phillips) as a nemesis for Haz; a former victim of his crimes, Wade seeks revenge and begins a spate of cyber crimes to ruin Haz's life. The plot culminated in a car accident plot, with Mackenzie running him over and Haz being comatose. His sister, Amira Devkar (Maria Thattil), was introduced into the series and scenes explored their problematic relationship. Haz also featured in a series of episodes set in the Australian outback.

Palekar left Neighbours after one year and Haz was written out of the series with Mackenzie. Writers created a wedding storyline for the duo prior to their departure. After marrying, Haz and Mackenzie leave Erinsborough and move to Paris. Palekar believed that Haz proved that redemption is possible despite its challenges, applauding the character for remaining "true to himself". He last appeared as Haz during the episode broadcast on 17 September 2024. Palekar reprised the role in 2025 for the show's final episodes. Neighbours writer Shane Isheev stated that Haz had "untapped potential" and wished the character had remained in the show longer. Haz has received a positive reception from critics of the genre. They commented on Haz's friendly and nice guy persona, with others favouring his backstory and the cyber crime stories.

== Casting ==
Auditions for Haz were held prior to Neighbours returning after Amazon Freevee rebooted the series following its 2022 cancellation. During the audition process for Haz, actor Shiv Pelaker decided to research the show further. He was born in India, he was raised in Hong Kong and was not entirely familiar with the show. Palekar watched Jackie Woodburne, who plays the character Susan Kennedy, perform a monologue in Neighbours' then final episode. This made him more inclined to secure a role in the show's revival because he realised that Neighbours is "something special".

Palekar's casting and the character were announced on 7 June 2023 via the serial's social media accounts. A Neighbours publicist wrote that "We're thrilled to announce that Shiv Palekar will be joining us in the new role of Haz Devkar in all new episodes of Neighbours later this year." It was also revealed that Haz would be managing Harold's Café. Fremantle Australia also released promotional photographs of Palekar in character, including one with Ian Smith, who plays Harold Bishop, the original owner of Harold's Café. Haz is one of several new characters introduced into Neighbours following the series being renewed by Amazon Freevee. Palekar made his first appearance as Haz during the episode broadcast on 18 September 2023. Palekar thought that playing a café manager was ironic because of his own work experiences. Palekar secured work in the hospitality sector in-between acting work. He found playing a character in the hospitality industry "a bit triggering" but "less stressful than real café work".

== Development ==
=== Introduction and Mackenzie ===
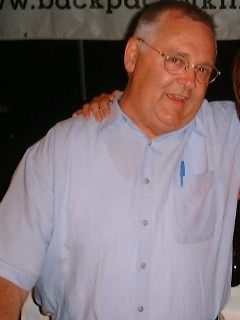
Ian Smith plays Harold Bishop, who writers used to introduce Haz into the role of Harold's Café manager.

When Haz is introduced into the series, he lives on Ramsay Street at Number 32. Producers included him in a house share concept alongside the established characters Mackenzie Hargreaves (Georgie Stone) and Byron Stone (Xavier Molyneux). When the show resumed broadcasting, the housemates are depicted as having been living together for only three months. Palekar told Tom Spilsbury from Total TV Guide that "the three of us are housemates, Haz has moved to Erinsborough and is running Harold's coffee shop." Haz relocates from Geelong to run the business, Palekar told Sarah Ellis from Inside Soap that Haz arrived looking for a house share. He added that the cast were unsure how Haz, Mackenzie and Byron originally became friends. Molyneux added that the three characters lead "very different work lives" and Stone concluded that "they're all getting along really well." The actor told Steven Murphy from TVTimes that Haz is characterised as "a real community person".

To aid Haz's introduction as the new owner of Harold's Café, he is featured in scenes previous owner Harold Bishop. Haz Palekar told Chloe Timms (Inside Soap) that Haz is portrayed as a "coffee snob" who tries to "force people into their coffee order." He added that Haz makes exceptions for those he likes. Set designers introduced new décor to the café and writers addressed this in scenes featuring Harold approving of Haz's changes. Palekar revealed that Harold is "excited about the new look" and that Haz and Harold get acquainted over the history of the coffee shop. He concluded that "the scenes with Haz and Harold are beautiful."

Writers positioned Haz as a potential love interest for Mackenzie. A bond develops between the two characters during Haz's initial episodes. Mackenzie is a widow, following the death of her husband, Hendrix Greyson (Ben Turland). This occurred two years prior to meeting Haz but writers portrayed her as willing to move on. Stone told Asyia Iftikhar from PinkNews that "the budding relationship between Mackenzie and Haz, that is gonna be really cool." She added that some of her "favourite moments" occurred whilst filming with Palekar. In one scene, Haz and Mackenzie get to know each other around their swimming pool at night. Palekar described it as "a beautiful night time scene" where they "discuss all the big questions" in life and begin "connecting". Palekar described it as one of his favourite scenes and a "beautiful moment".

In the backstage video series Ramsay Street Revelations, Stone revealed that it was an "incredibly big deal" for Mackenzie to be exploring romance again. She believed Mackenzie was reaching a point where she feels ready to move on. She described Haz and Mackenzie as "really good friends" and their early dynamic as a "will they? won't they?" style scenario. Stone stated that Mackenzie views Haz as "kind", "really genuine", "really funny", "really playful" and "really down to earth". Stone believed Mackenzie "loved" these personality traits. As Mackenzie had experienced much trauma, she is a "really drawn to" Haz's "lightness". In the video, Palekar stated that Haz has "ultimate respect and admiration" for Mackenzie. He revealed that Haz values "honesty and justice and truth and just doing good in the world." He believed that Mackenzie upheld these values and plays into Haz's attraction to Mackenzie. Palekar added that "I think Haz just admires the hell out of Mackenzie. He puts her on a pedestal, maybe to his detriment."

Mackenzie initially keeps her romantic feelings about Haz a secret. He encourages her to go on a date and she ends up meeting Eden Shaw (Costa D'Angelo). Writers also temporarily side-lined Mackenzie as Haz's love interest, by creating a romance between Haz and Billie Alessio (Georgia Walters). This relationship is short because Haz favours his pet dog, Trevor (Bodhi) over Billie.

=== Love triangle ===
There's a lot I think Mackenzie sees in Haz, he's a really genuine and kind person. He's really down to earth, which she really loves. He's really funny, he's really playful. And there's a lightness to him that I think Mackenzie is really drawn to given all the trauma.

— Georgie Stone on Mackenzie's admiration of Haz.

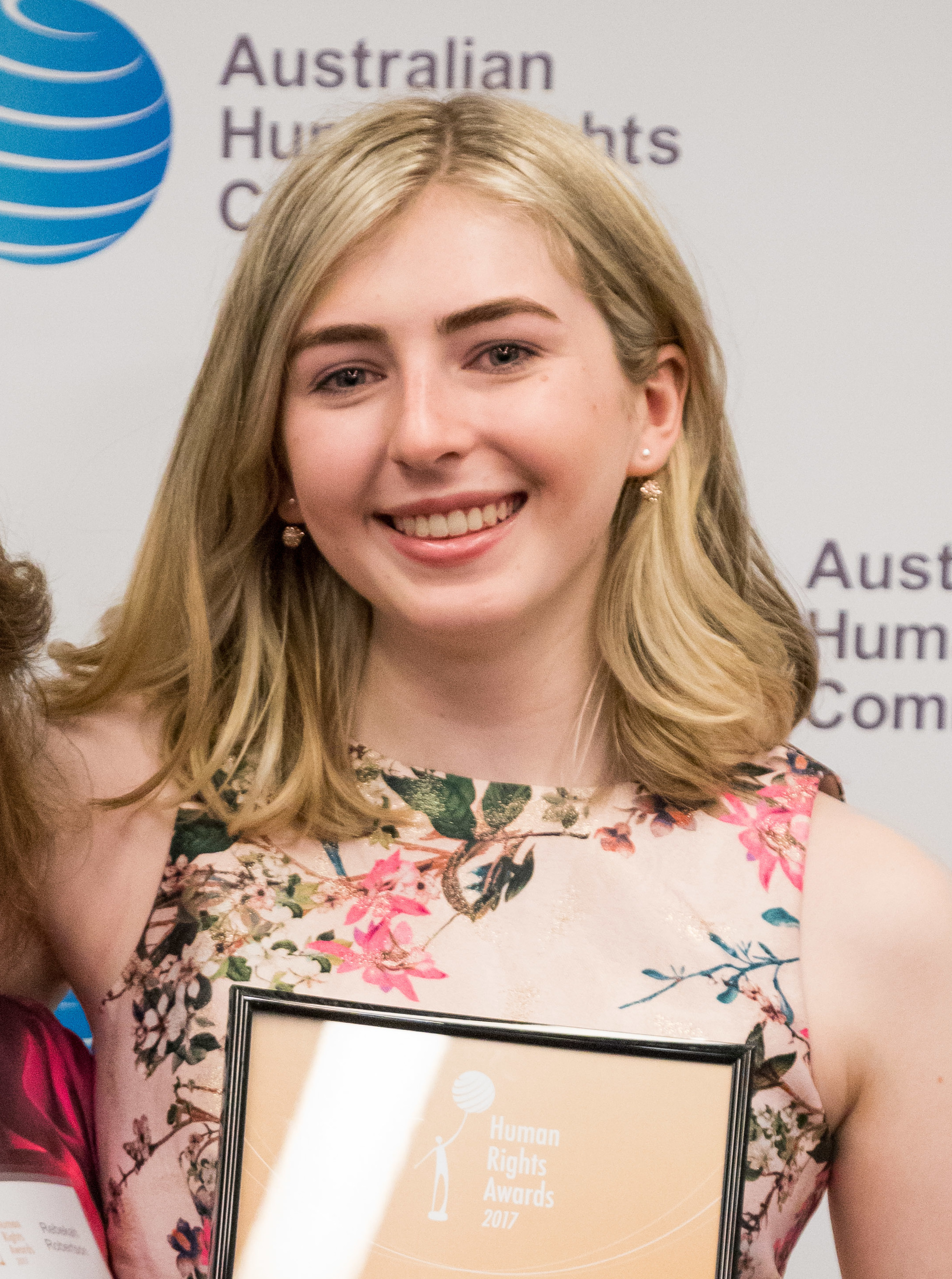
Georgie Stone plays Haz's main love interest, Mackenzie Hargreaves.

Writers further complicated the scenario by introducing Haz and Mackenzie's friend, Holly Hoyland (Lucinda Armstrong Hall) into the story. Holly and Mackenzie both have been hurt emotionally by Eden and seek out Haz's comfort. A Neighbours publicist told Inside Soap's Sarah Ellis that Mackenzie had romantic feelings for Haz for month, but only Sadie Rodwell (Emerald Chan) is privy to this. They added that both Mackenzie and Holly conclude that Haz is their ideal partner following turmoil with Eden. Holly's efforts to seduce Haz are not successful. The publicist added that Haz is more interested in Mackenzie and revealed that she was ultimately the reason Haz and Billie's relationship failed.

Haz and Holly begin a relationship but she soon becomes jealous of Mackenzie's hold over Haz. The story begins when Holly organises a Christmas get together where they exchange gifts. Mackenzie makes Haz a scarf and Holly is jealous when she witnesses their "deep connection" when exchanging gifts. A publicist told Chloe Simms from Inside Soap that Haz and Mackenzie "have been dancing around their feelings for months, but poor Holly might end up a casualty of their mixed signals." Holly destroys the scarf in a fit of rage and regrets her actions. Haz assumes that Trevor has chewed the scarf and Holly lets the dog be blamed. Holly confides in Byron about her actions and she decides to confess. Haz discovers video footage of Holly destroying the scarf before she can confess and confronts her. Holly tells Haz that she is aware of his romantic feelings for Mackenzie.

The love triangle story was centric to the show's special Christmas day episode. It explores the fall out between Haz, Mackenzie and Holly. Haz's Christmas party ends badly when Holly argues with Mackenzie about her feelings for Haz. Holly then falls into the swimming pool and beings drowning. Haz manages to save her. Writers portrayed another twist in the love triangle with Haz feeling guilty about Holly's accident and reconciles with her. Holly refuses to forgive Mackenzie and tells Haz and Mackenzie that one of them need to move out of the share house. In January 2024, Neighbours confirmed its plans to unite Haz and Mackenzie and explore their romance. Haz eventually breaks-up with Holly and then faces losing his dog, Trevor. The storyline leads into Mackenzie supporting Haz through the ordeal and beginning a relationship.

=== Cyber crime and accident ===
In 2024, writers explored issues arising from cyber crime via Haz, specifically hacking, AI attacks and deepfakes. Neighbours broadcast a mystery storyline beginning in March 2024, in which Harold's Café is robbed and vandalised. Digital Spy's Kilkelly described it as the show's "big March storyline" and included spoiler photographs that "confirmed a difficult time ahead" for Haz. Haz later receives a video showing himself vandalising the café. The storyline offered viewers no explanation and left them wondering if Haz was the perpetrator or possibly an identical twin. The show also included a reference in the scripts that alluded to Haz having an identical brother, to further confuse viewers. This is followed by more strange occurrences happening to people who Haz knows. Aaron Brennan (Matt Wilson) receives a telephone call from his dead husband, David Tanaka (Takaya Honda). A fake video of Jane Harris (Annie Jones) is then circulated online. They soon realise that the incidents are deep fakes being created by a mystery criminal. Writers also included a red-herring in the scripts, giving Haz a motive to trash his own business for insurance money. Writers created mystery surrounding Haz's behaviour which remained unexplained. Producers also cast Stephen Phillips as Wade Fernsby, a character connected to Haz's. Spoiler photographs revealed that Mackenzie would meet with Wade and investigate Haz's behaviour.

The next cyber attack occurs when Holly has ten thousand dollars stolen from her bank account. The funds are then deposited into Haz's bank account. A Neighbours publicist told Inside Soap's Sarah Ellis that the story would explore Haz's "dodgy past in IT". Police officer Andrew Rodwell (Lloyd Will) begins to investigate the crimes and discovers that the incidents are all linked. He discovers they were executed via a malware application that has been installed on various residents smart phone devices. Mackenzie is shocked when the software is discovered on her phone. Haz feels responsible and attempts to return the money back to Holly anonymously, but she and Mackenzie catch him. Haz lies to them but Mackenzie is suspicious of his behaviour and begins searching for evidence that Haz is responsible for the deep fake crimes. Mackenzie finds a hard drive belonging to Haz which incriminates him and confronts him. He is forced to admit that he previously was involved in cyber crime which included creating deep fakes and hacking. He begs Mackenzie to give him time to solve the new crimes. Mackenzie is unsure if she can forgive Haz's betrayal and as a lawyer, she feels "duty bound to go to the police". They added that his confession "reels" Mackenzie because "it turns out she doesn't know her boyfriend at all."

Producers created a car accident storyline for Haz when he is hit by a car driven by Mackenzie. Additional promotional photographs showed Wade and Haz in scenes filmed on location, using their laptops. Daniel Kilkelly from Digital Spy reported that Wade would be "calling the shots" in the scenes as he intimidates Haz, resulting in a "high stakes chase". They plot follows an escalation in the cyber crime story with Haz agreeing to help Wade to prevent any further harm to his neighbours. Wade blackmails Haz into helping him commit further hacking crimes. Haz tells his friends he will face his punishment for his historic cyber crimes but then disappears to help Wade. Mackenzie decides to report Haz to the police, unaware that she is putting him in further danger. Mackenzie and Karl Kennedy (Alan Fletcher) use a car to locate Haz. Palekar told Lucy Croke from TV Week that Haz leaves to help Wade because he allowed "all this go too far". Wade threatens to destroy Mackenzie's career and Palekar explained that Haz cannot allow this because "he's kept enough from her and now he's hoping to make things right."

Wade eventually realises Haz is wearing a wire and tricking him into a confession. A chase ensues between him and Wade, but Haz runs in front of Mackenzie's car and is knocked over and critically injured. The publicist revealed that "he goes flying up in the air. He lands in a crumpled heap, and Mac's terrified she's seriously hurt him - or worse." Palekar stated that the scene forces viewers to question Haz's fate, especially since he hit his head. Of Haz's reaction, he recounted "all he knows is he sees Mackenzie and is confused; he's not sure what's real or fake. He feels his heart surge and then everything goes dark." The car accident required the cast to perform stunts. Palekar enjoyed rehearsing and performing the stunt and believed the scene looked "pretty cool". An Inside Soap reporter announced a coma story for Haz. Haz's heart stopped after the collision which results in him being comatose and in a critical condition. They added that despite Haz's behaviour his friends would "rally round his bedside" and Mackenzie fully supports him. In the wake of the plot, Haz and Mackenzie's is strengthened. In a backstage video, Stone revealed ""after all of the AI stuff it made her aware of how much she cared about Haz." Neighbours writer Shane Isheev revealed that the "AI saga" was one of his favourite Haz stories and described Palekar's performance as "brilliant". Isheeve added "he didn't shy away from the material and embraced the fun of subverting the audience's expectations."

=== Family ===
Another relationship that writers created stories for was between Haz and his pet dog, Trevor. Producers introduced the dog alongside Haz. The inclusion of a pet was a long-standing tradition featured in Neighbours, which Trevor continues. Trevor is a cross breed between a Golden Retriever and a Poodle, better known as a Groodle. Despite being owned by Haz on-screen, Bodie is supplied to Neighbours from the animal talent agency, "Paws on Film" and was trained by Luke Hura. Hura previously trained numerous animals featured in Neighbours. Hura revealed that Bodie could become easily distracted during filming, despite being a "very intelligent dog". Pelaker told Inside Soap's Ellis that "Trevor's gorgeous, and is going to steal every scene. He's an agent of chaos - but beautiful chaos!"

In January 2024, it was revealed that writers would explore Haz's ownership of Trevor with the introduction of his original owner, Alyssa Gavalas (Imogen Sage). Alyssa meets Byron walking Trevor in the park and immediately recognises her lost dog, whose name is actually Bodie. Daniel Kilkelly from Digital Spy reported that Alyssa would seek contact with Haz to reconnect with her former pet. Haz is upset at the prospect of losing Trevor and seeks legal advice. Writers portrayed Haz in denial as he has refuses to believe Alyssa's claim to Trevor. He begins keeping Trevor indoors to hide him from Alyssa, fearing that she may take his pet away. A Neighbours publicist told Sarah Ellis from Inside Soap that Alyssa would continue to seek out Haz. They explained that "the idea of losing Trevor is so painful to Haz." The publicist added that "Alyssa really tugs on Haz's heartstrings" as she explains what Trevor meant to her family. Alyssa reveals that the dog was a gift from her dead mother to her son, Max Gavalas (Jethro Cassar). Haz reconsiders and makes a "heartbreaking decision" to give Trevor back to the Gavalas family. However, in a later episode, George Gavalas (Phil Hayden) arrives to give Trevor back to Haz.

In December 2023, it was announced that writers would explore Haz's family with the introduction of his older sister, Amira Devkar (Maria Thattil). A 10Play reporter described Amira as being "sometimes bossy" towards Haz. They revealed that Amira and Haz would have "an emotional reunion" and described a history of "challenges with their strict parents" in their backstories. The reporter added that Amira has her brother's "best interest at heart" but her arrival would not be welcomed by everyone. Amira is introduced following Haz's car accident and she blames Mackenzie for his coma. Amira claims that she wants to protect her brother as any sibling would, but she has ulterior motives due to their fractured relationship. Thattil told Lucy Croke from TV Week that "Amira and her parents were devastated by Haz's criminal past" and disowned him. Now that Haz has been injured "she feels guilty and wonders" if she has been too drastic by distancing herself from Haz. Thattil added that Amira feels "internal shame" about how she has treated Haz. Writers displayed a troubled sibling dynamic in the scenes that followed. Haz wants to repair his relationship with his family but Amira and Mackenzie do not get along. Amira constantly comes in-between Haz and Mackenzie relationship and Haz is portrayed as a "peacemaker" between the two. When Amira prevents Mackenzie helping with Haz's legal battle, Mackenzie retaliates by telling Amira negative things Haz has said about her. Amira announces that she is leaving, which causes "tension" between Haz and Mackenzie. Mark Silveira and Camille Gautam were later cast as parents, Sanjeev Devkar and Reena Devkar respectively.

=== Outback week ===
On 4 July 2024, it was announced that Haz would feature in a special week of episodes titled "Death in the Outback". The episode explore several characters in a remote part of the Australian outback. It was revealed that one character would be killed off during the week but producers did not publicise the character's identity in advance. Alongside Haz, it was confirmed that Mackenzie, Holly, Toadie Rebecchi (Ryan Moloney), Melanie Pearson (Lucinda Cowden), Heath Royce (Ethan Panizza) and Tess Carmichael (Anica Calida) would all feature in the outback scenes. In the story, Holly and Heath travel to the outback. Haz and Mackenzie become worried when they cannot contact Holly and decide to catch a flight to the area to locate them. The plot became known as "Outback week" and was promoted with a trailer showcasing some of the week's stories, including Haz's arrival in the area. Armstrong Hall and Cowden teased that the week featured "spectacular scenes" and dramatic stories. They also likened it to filming an independent feature film.

Palekar described filming the "Outback week" as "an absolute highlight" of his time on Neighbours. He revealed that he travelled to remote South Australia for filming. Palekar and Stone filmed scenes in a small aircraft that actually took flight for a location shoot. Palekar revealed it was "a little six seater plane, they took out two of the middle seats, there was a camera man in there pointing back at us and we got to look out and see these amazing bits of the country that I don't think we would have otherwise seen. He concluded that the experience was "super, super special".

When the episodes were broadcast, Haz and Mackenzie take a chartered plane flight to Mount Harper. When they arrive they attempt to find Holly at a cattle station in Warrawee but become lost in the outback. Other scenes included Haz and Holly watching Heath being killed by a crocodile and Mackenzie being shot by a stray bullet. In the aftermath of the week's episodes, Mackenzie was taken to hospital and begins to recover. However, she becomes ill and passes out in Haz's arms.

=== Wedding and departure ===
On 5 September 2023, it was announced that both Palekar and Stone had left Neighbours and their characters would depart that month. Of his departure, Palekar stated "I'll miss everything - the wonderful cast, the incredible crew, the great storylines." He added that he would miss working with the "share-house gang" because they had become close friends during filming their scenes. He concluded that it "hurt" to say good-bye to them and playing Haz had been "a wonderful experience". Palekar believed that Haz's story showed that people are "deserving of a second chance". Haz learnt Palekar that "the pursuit of goodness and redemption is not an easy road, but it's possible." He concluded that Haz "wears his heart on his sleeve" always and remained "true to himself despite it all".

The duo's final story plays out after Mackenzie receives a job offer in Paris. Haz agrees to move to Paris with her, putting the cafe up for sale and resuming his tech career. Writers decided to give the couple a happy ending with a wedding storyline. Stone had asked producers to give Mackenzie a happy ending to her story. She described the wedding as "a classic Neighbours happy ending". Stone was surprised that they chose another wedding story for her character because Mackenzie had already been married once and was still young. She explained that it was logical because Mackenzie "wants to hold tight to what she has" with Haz. The story includes dramatic elements such as Wade's revenge plan and Haz's parents refusal to attend. Wade was written back into the series ahead of Haz's departure storyline. After Wade's reintroduction, Felix Rodwell (James Beaufort) overhears Wade's conversation and realises he is planning revenge. Wade pays someone to tamper with Haz's car brakes. Felix later witnesses a criminal near Haz's car and begins to investigate.

Despite these dramatic elements, writers developed a happy ending for Haz via the reunification of the Devkar family. During the wedding episode, Haz's parents, Reena and Sanjeev decide to attend. Palekar told Ellis that Haz was "heartbroken" when they refused to attend but is "over the moon" at their change of mind. He explained that Haz and his parents "still have a lot to work through, but I think the fact that they have come to the wedding is an amazing first step for their future as a family." Haz and Mackenzie marry in front of their friends and family with Susan conducting the ceremony. In their final scenes, Haz and Mackenzie set off for their new life in Paris. Wade's revenge plan against the duo fails to work as planned and they leave unharmed. Terese Willis (Rebekah Elmaloglou) drives the car home and crashes. Palekar and Stone filmed their character's final scenes two weeks before they finished filming with Neighbours. Palekar's final appearance as Haz was broadcast on 17 September 2024. Of Haz and Mackenzie's Parisian future, Palekar concluded "I think a wonderful life awaits them - they're going to love living in Paris. Mack is definitely going to pull big moves at the UN and Haz will no doubt have a great run in cybersecurity, it's mighty lucrative for an ex-hacker!" Of Palekar's departure, writer Isheev stated "We didn't have Haz or Palekar for long, but that doesn't mean they didn't make an impact. When I returned to the show, Haz was still a blank canvas and it was great to flesh out his backstory." Isheev concluded his "only regret" was the show did not have Haz for longer because "he has huge untapped potential."

Both Palekar and Stone reprised their roles as Haz and Mackenzie for the show's final episodes in 2025. Their return storyline features them joining a protest against demolition works planned as part of a freeway building project in Erinsborough.

== Reception ==
Upon his introduction, a journalist from Who branded Haz "a charming 24 year old". Ellis writing for Inside Soap classified Haz as a "nice-guy neighbour". Stephen Patterson from Metro opined that Haz "has all the makings of a fan-favourite" character. He added "I might be a little bit in love with him already." His colleague Michael Adams called the promotional wedding photographs as "heart-warming". Of Haz's relationship with Mackenzie he assessed "it's been a rocky road for the two" due to cyber crimes and both of them being critically injured in stories. Mike Watkins from ATV Today chose Holly's ultimatum to Haz in the brand's "pick of the plots" feature. Of their break-up and reconciliation, he jibed "the world's briefest 'break' is officially over".

Susannah Alexander from Digital Spy branded Haz being run over as a "shocking" and "horrifying accident", adding the Haz and Wade plot came to a "terrifying head". Fellow reporter, Kilkelly called Haz's cyber crime stories a "baffling new Haz Devkar mystery" and a "major new storyline twist". His colleague Sara Baaller added it was a "mysterious storyline". Kilkelly later branded Haz and Mackenzie's departures as "heartwarming exit scenes" following a "joyous ceremony".

Pip Ellwood-Hughes from Entertainment Focus assessed Haz's character transformation via the cyber crime storyline. Originally they claimed "you'd be hard pressed to find a nicer character than Haz"; adding "generally he's one of the nicest characters on the show." They noted that as the storyline developed, Haz's behaviour became "progressively odder" and left viewers confused. They later described the story as a "bumpy few weeks" for Haz after his past "shocked" viewers. Ellwood-Hughes concluded he was "intrigued to learn more about Haz's family and background, especially after learning he's not the good guy we thought he was." Michael Darling from Whattowatch.com profiled the top ten storylines from Neighbours' first year on Amazon. Darling included Haz's cybercrime past in seventh place. Darling believed that Haz and Wade's story "ended in disaster". He noted his surprise that the "friendly coffee shop owner" was actually a "highly-skilled computer hacker" with a "shady, criminal past", adding it was unthinkable.
