= Porcupine Lake =

2017 film

- Film poster
- Directed by: Ingrid Veninger
- Written by: Ingrid Veninger
- Produced by: Ingrid Veninger
- Starring: Delphine Roussel; Lucinda Armstrong Hall
- Cinematography: Ben Lichty
- Edited by: Chris Mutton
- Production company: pUNK Films
- Distributed by: Films We Like; Breaking Glass Pictures
- Release date: 7 September 2017 (TIFF)
- Running time: 84 minutes
- Country: Canada
- Language: English

Porcupine Lake is a 2017 Canadian drama film written, produced, and directed by Ingrid Veninger. It was screened in the Contemporary World Cinema section at the 2017 Toronto International Film Festival. The film received positive reviews from The Film Stage and Film Threat.

== Plot ==
Bea (Charlotte Salisbury) and her mom move to Northern Ontario during a summer, where Bea soon meets Kate (Lucinda Armstrong Hall). What initially begins as a close friendship between the two pre-teen girls gradually develops into an unexpected romantic connection.

== Cast ==
- Delphine Roussel as Ally
- Christopher Bolton as Scotty
- Lucinda Armstrong Hall as Kate
- Maxime Robin as Emile
- Charlotte Salisbury as Bea
- Harrison Tanner as Romeo
