= Ethan Panizza =

Australian actor and football player

- Born: 1 October 1991 (age 35); Albany, Western Australia
- Occupation: Actor
- Years active: 2013–present

Ethan Panizza is an Australian television actor from Albany, Western Australia. He began by appearing in short film and television commercials. In 2018, Panizza took the role of Rusty O'Reilly in the Network Ten drama series Playing for Keeps.

== Early life ==
Ethan Panizza was born in Albany, Western Australia and is the son of former Australian rules footballer Darrell Panizza. He attended Albany Senior High School and took part in amateur drama productions. When his parents split-up, he moved to the Gold Coast with his mother Diane. He had a passion for acting as a child and felt that it gave him an outlet to express himself. Despite advice from his mother to pursue acting, Panizza decided to begin a football career in an attempt to reconnect with his father back in Western Australia. Panizza began playing for the Claremont Football Club at reserves level. He later sustained a hamstring injury leaving him unable to play for eight weeks. While he recovered, Panizza used the time to take an acting course. Actor John Orcsik singled out Panizza performance on the course and resulted in him changing his career aspirations.

In 2014, he signed up to a twenty-week course at The Australian Film & Television Academy (TAFTA) in Sydney. While studying in Sydney he took a full-time job as an electrician. Panizza soon signed with the American management company Silver Lining Entertainment. He was also selected for further acting training in Los Angeles.

== Acting career ==
He resumed his acting career by appearing in a number of television commercials and music videos. In 2013, he appeared in two short films titled Turkish Delight and Blue Boys. In 2014, the actor appeared in the Australian television documentary series The War That Changed Us, playing Harold Burk. Panizza played the guest role of Ray Davis in an episode of the ABC drama The Doctor Blake Mysteries.

In May 2018, it was announced that he had secured the role of Rusty O'Reilly in the Network Ten drama series Playing for Keeps. The show is about a group of AFL players and their wives' personal lives. Panizza's background in football benefited him during filming as he was able to accurately portray an AFL player. Rusty is a gay character who is forced to come out in the Australian media. To prepare for the role Panizza researched coming out stories on the internet. The actor hoped the story would inspire football players to be more open about their sexual orientation. In July 2024, it was announced that Panizza had joined the cast of the Australian soap opera Neighbours as Heath Royce, with Heath set to debut later that month.

== Filmography ==
=== Film ===
| Year | Title | Role | Notes |
|---|---|---|---|
| 2013 | Turkish Delight | James | Short film |
| 2013 | Blue Boys | Undercover cop | Short film |
| 2016 | Wings | James | Short film |
| 2022 | High Power | Bailey | Short film |

=== Television ===
| Year | Title | Role | Notes |
|---|---|---|---|
| 2014 | The War That Changed Us | Harold Burk | Documentary series |
| 2017 | Bro/Science/Life: The Series | | Web series |
| 2017 | Seven Bucks Digital Studios | | Guest role |
| 2017 | The Doctor Blake Mysteries | Ray Davis | Guest role |
| 2018–19 | Playing for Keeps | Rusty O'Reilly | Regular role |
| 2023 | The Claremont Murders | Steven | Guest role |
| 2024 | Neighbours | Heath Royce | Guest role |
