= Shiv Palekar =

Australian actor

- Born: Mumbai, India
- Occupation: Actor
- Years active: 2015–present
- Agent: Shanahan
- Television: Shantaram; Neighbours

Shiv Palekar is an Indian actor. He was born in the 1990s in Mumbai, India, and raised in Hong Kong. In 2012, Palekar moved to Sydney, Australia, to study acting at National Institute of Dramatic Art (NIDA). After Palekar graduated in 2014, he joined the Bell Shakespeare players national tour. This helped his transition into the Australian acting industry. Palekar gained numerous theatre acting roles in the following years. He secured work for some of Australia's notable companies including the Griffin Theatre Company, the Melbourne Theatre Company and the Sydney Theatre Company. In 2019, Palekar worked with Belvoir on the theatre show Counting and Cracking, playing the role of Siddharatha. The show was a critical success and won numerous awards. In 2022, Palekar reprised the role Siddharatha for a UK tour and again in 2024 for Australian and US performances.

He is also known for his work in Australian television, predominantly as Vikram in the 2022 American-Australian drama series Shantaram and in the soap opera Neighbours, which he joined the show's regular cast in the role of Haz Devkar from 2023 to 2025.

== Early life ==
Palekar was born in 1993 in Mumbai, India. He spent his early life being raised by his mother, with whom he later moved to Hong Kong. Palekar's maternal grandfather was a captain in the Merchant Navy of India. His paternal grandfather was a working man from Mumbai. Palekar believes that his numerous international residences resulted in him feeling like an "immigrant or outsider" in both India and Hong Kong. He credits his later childhood living in Hong Kong as helping him achieve his success. When he was a teenager, Palakar had aspirations of becoming a musician. During his Year 10 school year in Hong Kong, his mother encouraged him to audition for a school play. The experience helped Palekar discover that he wanted to be an actor.

He studied physical theatre at Zen Zen Zo Physical Theatre Company in Brisbane, Australia, via a six-month internship. He trained in both Butoh and the Suzuki method of acting. In 2012, when he was eighteen years old, Palekar moved to Sydney, Australia to further study acting at the National Institute of Dramatic Art (NIDA). During this time he appeared in various NIDA produced theatre shows. He graduated in 2014 with a Bachelor of Dramatic Art (Acting). Palekar later applied for Australian citizenship which as of 2023, had not been granted.

== Career ==
After Palekar graduated from NIDA in 2014, he joined the Bell Shakespeare players on a ten month Australian tour. Palekar stated it was "perfect opportunity" to utilise the skills he had learned at drama school. He credited the tour for helping him transition into the professional acting industry. In 2016, he secured his first main role in theatre Abe in the Sydney Theatre Company's show Disgraced, which was directed by Sarah Goodes and written by Ayad Akhtar. Sachin Joab also appeared in the show and it explored contemporary attitudes on religion, in particular Islam. In October 2012, he played Lester in This, This Is Mine which was an alternative theatrical concept staged in a house. It was produced by "The Corinthian Food Store", a Sydney based acting collective which Palekar joined. In July 2017, he played Lorenzo/Morocco in Bell Shakespeare's The Merchant of Venice.

In August and September 2018, Palekar played Oliver in the Griffin Theatre Company show The Almighty Sometimes, alongside established actors Hannah Waterman, Penny Cook and Brenna Harding. In January 2019, Palekar played Siddharatha (Sid) in the theatre show Counting and Cracking which was produced by the Belvoir theatre company. The play tells the story of four generations of the one Sri Lankan family. The show was successful and gained numerous awards, including awards for diversity and two Victorian Premier's Literary Awards. He then had the minor role of Billy in Sydney Theatre Company's The Real Thing. Palekar then played Ray Dooley, in the company's production of The Beauty Queen of Leenane. Palekar has since stated it was his favourite theatre project that he had participated in.

During the COVID-19 pandemic, Palekar was unsure if he would work in Australia again. He remained in Hong Kong because he was unable to return to Australia on his work visa. This was because of the government's COVID-related rules regarding entry to the country. This halted Palekar's theatre career and he played no stage roles during 2020 and 2021. He later returned to Australia to resume his acting career but had to quarantine in a hotel room for seven weeks. Despite this, Palekar played Drew Tweedy-Bell in the 2021 film The Greenhouse, a role he had actually filmed in 2017.

In May 2022, Palekar made his debut for the Melbourne Theatre Company in their production of The Sound Inside. It was a show with only two acting roles, Palekar played Christopher and Catherine McClements played Bella. Palekar had auditioned for the role via Zoom during his seven weeks quarantining. Palekar later revealed that his personal experiences with bureaucracy helped him better understand the role. He later reprised his role as Siddharatha in Counting and Cracking and the show toured the UK. In August it was part of the annual Edinburgh Festival Fringe at the Royal Lyceum Theatre in Edinburgh. It also played at the Birmingham Repertory Theatre during the Birmingham 2022 Festival. In November, he played Ferdinand in the Sydney Theatre Company's production of The Tempest. Also in 2022, Palekar gained his first regular television role playing Vikram in Apple TV+'s drama series Shantaram. The show was cancelled by Apple after just one season.

In 2023, Palekar joined the cast of the Australian soap opera Neighbours, playing the regular role of Haz Devkar. He was hired during the time Neighbours was being rebooted by Amazon Freevee. The character works in hospitality managing a café, which Palekar thought was ironic given his previous job roles in the sector outside of his acting career. Following his audition, Palekar watched Jackie Woodburne, who plays the character Susan Kennedy, perform a monologue in Neighbours' then final episode. This made him more inclined to secure a role in the show's revival because he realised that Neighbours is "something special". Palekar left the show after one year, with Haz's final scenes broadcast in September 2024. Palekar stated "I've learnt from Haz that the pursuit of goodness and redemption is not an easy road, but it's possible." He reprised his Siddharatha role in Counting and Cracking from June to July 2024 at Belvoir and again during September 2024 at the NYU Skirball in New York City.

In 2025, Palekar played Rohan Khatri in the second series of Australian-British comedy-drama, Return to Paradise. Palekar also reprised his Neighbours role as Haz for the show's final episodes that year.

== Filmography ==
Year	Title	Role	Notes
2017	Picking Up	Felippe	Short film
2017	Cleverman	Advisor #2 / Khan	Guest role
2017	Growing Up Gracefully	Ex-boyfriend	Guest role
2018	Granny	Const. Jackson	Guest role
2018	Inadequate	Dirk	Guest role
2020	Gooddog	Shem	Guest role
2020	Among Men	Michael	Short film
2020	Liberty Street	Trent	Guest role
2020	Colour Blind	Shiv	Guest role
2021	The Greenhouse	Drew Tweedy-Bell	Film role
2022	Shantaram	Vikram	Regular role
2023–2025	Neighbours	Haz Devkar	Regular role
2025	Return to Paradise	Rohan Khatri	Guest role
