= Lucinda Armstrong Hall =

Australian actress

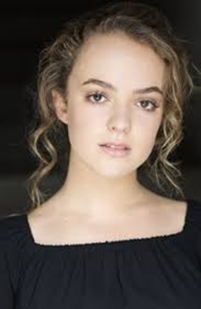

Lucinda Armstrong Hall is an Australian actress. She is acclaimed for her performances across television, film and stage. She is known for her portrayal of Holly Hoyland in Neighbours from 2013 to 2014 and 2017 to 2018, before she returned in 2023 as a series regular until the show's end in December 2025. She is known for her performance in Ingrid Veninger's film Porcupine Lake, for which she received a Canadian Screen Award nomination for Best Supporting Actress at the 6th Canadian Screen Awards. She was praised by critics and industry peers for her emotional depth, versatility, and commitment to her craft and has been recognised with nominations in film and television.

== Career ==
Lucinda Armstrong Hall made her professional stage debut in 2011 in national productions of Annie at Melbourne’s Regent Theatre and then in Chitty Chitty Bang Bang at Her Majesty’s Theatre. These early performances set the stage for a career that would span Australian and international productions.

=== Television ===
She gained national attention for her role as Holly Hoyland in Neighbours. In 2023, she appeared in the SBS drama Safe Home.

=== Film ===
Armstrong Hall's film debut came with a small role in the 2014 science fiction thriller Predestination, followed by the 2015 comedy Now Add Honey. Her breakout role was in Ingrid Veninger’s Porcupine Lake (2017). She played Kate, a brash, emotionally raw teenager in a coming-of-age story. Her performance earned her a Canadian Screen Award nomination for Best Supporting Actress.

In 2023, she portrayed Renee, a tough and streetwise teen mum in Noora Niasari's critically-acclaimed Shayda. The film won the Audience Award in the World Cinema Dramatic competition at the Sundance Film Festival and was selected as Australia’s entry for Best International Feature Film category at the 2024 Academy Awards.

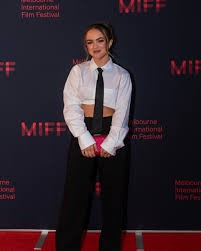
