= Episode 9363 (Neighbours) =

- Neighbours episode
- The final shot of the series, featuring Susan Kennedy (Jackie Woodburne), Karl Kennedy (Alan Fletcher) and Paul Robinson (Stefan Dennis) standing on Ramsay Street. Executive producer Jason Herbison stated that the trio were "surrounded by ghosts of the 2022 ending" in the final shot.
- Episode no.: Episode 9363
- Directed by: Scott Major
- Written by: Jason Herbison
- Cinematography by: Darrel Martin; Heath Kerr
- Editing by: Angelo Siderelis
- Original air date: 11 December 2025
- Running time: 28 minutes

Guest appearances
- Zima Anderson as Roxy Willis; Gemma Bird Matheson as Kiri Durant; Lucinda Cowden as Melanie Pearson; Kimberley Davies as Annalise Hartman; Kate Gorman as Sue Parker; Ben Hall as Ned Willis; Liam Maguire as Rhett Norman; Scott Major as Lucas Fitzgerald; Xavier Molyneux as Byron Stone; Richie Morris as Levi Canning; Peter O'Brien as Shane Ramsay; Shiv Palekar as Haz Devkar; Ayisha Salem-Towner as Nell Rebecchi; Georgie Stone as Mackenzie Hargreaves; Darcy Tadich as Jimmy Williams; Sally-Ann Upton as Vera Punt; Jason Wilder as Clint Hendry; Matt Wilson as Aaron Brennan; Hana Abe-Tucker as Isla Tanaka-Brennan; Nikita Kato as Abigail Tanaka

Episode chronology
| ← Previous; Episode 9362 | Next → — |

Episode 9363 of the Australian soap opera Neighbours premiered on 11 December 2025 in the United Kingdom on Amazon Prime Video. It was also broadcast on Network 10 in Australia but was consolidated into a feature length episode with Episode 9362. It is the final episode of Neighbours after the show was cancelled for a third time after forty years of broadcasting. Neighbours was cancelled due to the loss of its broadcaster and main investor, Amazon MGM Studios. The episode was written by Jason Herbison and directed by Scott Major. Neighbours: The Finale (2022) was originally envisioned as the final episode of the show but the show was unexpectedly renewed by Amazon for their Amazon Freevee channel. Production on Neighbours ended in July 2025, after Amazon declined to renew the series.

The episode's plot revolves around the threat of demolition to the series' Ramsay Street setting, following the announcement of a freeway development. Paul Robinson (Stefan Dennis) and Shane Ramsay (Peter O'Brien) pitch rival developments to past and present Ramsay Street residents, who contemplate what their futures might hold, while Susan Kennedy (Jackie Woodburne) determines to fight to save Ramsay Street. The episode was designed to reflect the real-world position of Neighbours and offer potential concepts for future revivals.

The episode received positive reviews from television critics who applauded Herbison's decision not to attempt to recreate the style of the previous finale. Episode 9363 was initially met with scepticism from critics who believed the 2022 finale had been so successful that another finale would be of inferior quality. Analysis that was more negative focused on the episode failing to relive the previous finale's grandeur and celebratory theme.

== Plot ==
Remi, Cara and JJ Varga-Murphy drive into Ramsay Street, mirroring their first arrival two years previously. (Note: As shown in episode 8904.) Susan Kennedy, Karl Kennedy and Holly Hoyland discuss the potential end of Ramsay Street. Paul Robinson and Terese Willis look forward to a future away from the street, with Paul establishing his Robinson Towers development. Byron Stone, Aaron Brennan and Rhett Norman visit Jane Harris after Shane Ramsay invites them to view his own new development site, Ramsay Hills. Andrew and Wendy Rodwell intend to sell their house and go their separate ways, following the exposure of Andrew's affair with Holly. Krista Sinclair and Leo Tanaka tell their family that she is pregnant. Mackenzie Hargreaves and Haz Devkar reunite with Byron and Holly, and Mackenzie encourages Holly to be kind to herself.

Past and present residents gather at the Waterhole for the Ramsay Hills presentation led by Shane and his son, Max. Remi discusses regaining her memory with Wendy and Andrew. Paul and his grandson, Jimmy, sabotage the presentation and attempt to promote Robinson Towers to the group. Karl takes over from Shane to speak on behalf of Ramsay Hills. When discussing their visions for the new neighbourhoods, Paul and Karl co-opt the words Susan previously wrote in the Ramsay Street history book. (Note: As shown in "Neighbours: The Finale".) Susan responds emotionally and leaves the presentation to meet Annalise Hartman, who reveals that it may be possible to save the street.

The residents attend a site visit to either Robinson Towers or Ramsay Hills, where they contemplate what the future may hold for them. At Robinson Towers, Sadie Rodwell tells Wendy that she is uneasy about moving on without her father. At Ramsay Hills, Holly and Andrew choose the name River for their unborn son, following Holly's recent miscarriage. When the two groups return to the Waterhole, Wendy asks to speak to Andrew. Dex Varga-Murphy returns home from summer camp and his family ask him to help make their decision about their future.

Realising that Susan did not attend either site visit, Karl and Paul return to Ramsay Street to find her. Susan reveals that she wants to fight for the street because other communities have beaten the odds. She states they have been through this before, and despite being able to see a future at either development, she loves Ramsay Street and does not want to find a new life. Paul asks what they are going to do.

== Regular cast appearances ==
- Jakob Ambrose as Colton Keys
- Lucinda Armstrong Hall as Holly Hoyland
- James Beaufort as Felix Rodwell
- Riley Bryant as JJ Varga-Murphy
- Emerald Chan as Sadie Rodwell
- Majella Davis as Krista Sinclair
- Stefan Dennis as Paul Robinson
- Rebekah Elmaloglou as Terese Willis
- Alan Fletcher as Karl Kennedy
- Ben Jackson as Max Ramsay
- Elise Jansen as Elle Robinson
- Lakota Johnson as Taye Obasi
- Annie Jones as Jane Harris
- Alex Kaan as Zac Willis
- Tim Kano as Leo Tanaka
- Candice Leask as Wendy Rodwell
- Hannah Monson as Nicolette Stone
- Naomi Rukavina as Remi Varga-Murphy
- Sara West as Cara Varga-Murphy
- Lloyd Will as Andrew Rodwell
- Marley Williams as Dex Varga-Murphy
- Jackie Woodburne as Susan Kennedy

== Production ==
=== Background ===
The series had previously been cancelled in 2022, following the show's British broadcaster and main investor pulling funding from the show. The show came to an end on 28 July 2022, with Neighbours: The Finale originally conceived as the show's final episodes. On 17 November 2022, it was announced Fremantle and Amazon Studios had secured a deal to bring the show back into production for their streaming channel, Amazon Freevee.

On 20 February 2025, Carl Greenwood from The Sun published a news story claiming that Amazon MGM Studios and Neighbours' production company Fremantle had failed to reach an agreement on the renewal of the series. The story was published prior to the show's cast and crew being informed, which they had planned to do the following morning. David Knox from TV Tonight noted the closure of Amazon Freevee and the departure of producers who commissioned the series to Amazon as reasons for the cancellation. It was revealed that production of Neighbours would continue until July 2025 and a series finale was planned to be broadcast in December 2025. Isabella Rayner from Sky News Australia reported it would be the show's "final episode". A petition to save the series and prevent the episode being its last was launched on change.org and amassed more than 19682 signatures.

On 11 July 2025, the show was then given a tentative final broadcast date of 11 December 2025 and it was confirmed that the 9363rd episode would be its last.

=== Development ===
The show's executive producer Jason Herbison first spoke about the final episode the following day after the cancellation announcement. He told Angela Bishop from 10 News First it was too early to know what the episode would feature. He acknowledged he wanted it to be "a little bit" different to the previous finale episode. He added "I certainly wouldn't want to repeat myself – that was a great finale, I loved writing that episode. It was incredible that everyone came back for it. I don't know, I think this time around it would be a little bit of a different tone." He concluded that he envisioned Neighbours as being "eternal" and the finale would have "a door left open kind of ending again."

Herbison knew he could not end the series in the same way as he previously did. The show was losing its studios and backlot sets at Nunawading studios. The site was sold to property redevelopers but was leased back to the show's parent company, Fremantle Media. Herbison noted this was not the case when the previous finale was created so he had to approach it differently. He created an ending which could allow the show to return again without it relying on using the studios. He told Lucy Croke from TV Week that "this is what the finale sets out to do." Writing in TV Tonight after the finale, Herbison described the Robinson Towers and Ramsay Hills developments as "backdoor spin-off ideas", which each provided "an opportunity to create a leaner [production] model that isn't shackled to a costly heritage site". He also told Johnathon Hughes from Radio Times that "I approached the ending very differently this time. I knew I couldn't compete with 2022 or do the same thing twice."

Herbsion set the tone for the episode as optimistic but wanted to incorporate the sentiment the production were feeling about losing the show and studios. He opted to develop a storyline about Ramsay Street facing demolition. He explained that "I couldn't help but play with that sense of deja-vu. We have been here before, right? The threat to the street is an echo of what is happening to the show itself." The episode's final scene pays homage to the previous final scene from Neighbours: The Finale. Herbison included a much smaller cast for the scene than that were included for its predecessor. It took Herbison months to make peace with the show ending but he revealed that he felt different by the time the finale was broadcast. He described the ending of Episode 9363 as challenging to create and struggled to conclude all the characters storylines. He believed he needed an extra weeks worth of episodes to have done it better. He concluded "I hope the loyal fans can appreciate why I've gone the way I did." In the months after production finished, spoilers about the show's finale were discovered before it was broadcast. The episode's dialogue remained a secret, which Herbison hoped would surprise viewers.

There was more content filmed for the episode that post-production had to cut from the final edit. Herbison revealed "I'm a nightmare for directors because I always write long and I enjoy having material to play with in the edit." Of the show's future, Herbison said the episode features "a little bit of a twist which does leave open many possibilities". He also teased that the rival housing developments were possible future spin-offs, and that there was a real chance Neighbours could return as a limited series.

=== Cast ===
Herbison mainly chose former cast members to return for the episode from the show's Amazon era. Other characters from its previous run were selected to return because they had been planned to return before the show had run out of time to do so. On 10 November 2025, many Amazon era cast members were confirmed to have returned for the show's final episodes. These were Scott Major as Lucas Fitzgerald, Peter O'Brien as Shane Ramsay, Kimberley Davies as Annalise Hartman, Georgie Stone as Mackenzie Hargreaves, Shiv Palekar as Haz Devkar. Richie Morris, who last played Levi Canning in 2022 also reprised his role and Kate Gorman appeared as Sue Parker. In addition, Naomi Rukavina was confirmed to be returning from maternity leave to give her character, Remi Varga-Murphy an ending. On 20 November, more returns were confirmed including the non Amazon era cast members Ben Hall as Ned Willis and Darcy Tadich as Jimmy Williams. Also confirmed were a raft of cast whose characters last appeared in 2025, including Ayisha Salem-Towner as Nell Rebecchi, Zima Anderson as Roxy Willis, Xavier Molyneux as Byron Stone, Gemma Bird Matheson as Kiri Durant, Matt Wilson as Aaron Brennan, Liam Maguire as Rhett Norman and Lucinda Cowden as Melanie Pearson. Herbison later revealed that Levi and Ned were the two character he had planned to reintroduce into the show and therefore included them in Episode 9363.

Cowden was partly responsible for her return as Melanie as she feared not being invited back. She emailed Herbison about returning, noting "I tried to sort of give it a humorous tinge, rather than try to sound quite so desperate." He responded to Cowden, asking for time to figure out her return and her agent soon contacted her confirming her return. In a backstage video, Molyneux claimed he did not want any dialogue but "I just wanted to come and say hi to the cast and crew, and tie it all up in a bow and just be here, I guess."

Ryan Moloney was asked to return as Toadie Rebecchi but was unavailable at the time of filming. Herbison revealed that Toadie is mentioned in the episode. Herbison wanted to bring back additional cast members such as those who played Paul's children absent from the series, but the plans did not materialise. Herbison did not ask the "superstar alumni" like Kylie Minogue, Jason Donovan or Guy Pearce to return again. He felt that they had been "so generous" to come back in 2022, he would not have asked them to return a second time.

=== Writing and filming ===
The episode was written by Jason Herbison. Fletcher told Chloe Timms from Inside Soap that when he received the scripts for the finale he was shocked by how much content production were going to attempt to include from a logistical perspective. Woodburne described the script as being "very different" to the one written for the previous finale. She explained that before the cast and crew believed the show was ending for good. This time they felt more hopeful of a revival and Herbison tried to include this feeling of hope in his scripts. Woodburne concluded that you are "left with some sense of hope that, even if it's not on telly, these people, in these houses, in this street will continue to go on."

The episode was directed by Scott Major, who also reprised his role of Lucas Fitzgerald on-screen. When production filmed the final episodes of Neighbours, the sets and studios were actively being dismantled at the same time. Production finished filming scenes on Pin Oak Court in Vermont South, the location of the show's fictional Ramsay Street on 4 July 2025. Palekar (Haz) and Stone (Mackenzie) revealed that the returning cast "just snapped back into the old dynamic" once they were back on set filming. Stone recalled filming scenes on the set of the show's pub, The Waterhole where Molyneux and Palekar "clicked right back into your very funny, very silly dynamic." Neighbours finished production on 11 July 2025 and the show's regular cast gave interviews about the end of Neighbours. The show's final scenes were filmed at their Nunawading studios. Herbison was on-set when the final scene of Episode 9363 was filmed. He recalled becoming emotional because of Jackie Woodburne's performance as Susan Kennedy, telling Radio Times' Hughes that she "made me cry in 2022 and she's done it again in 2025!" Stefan Dennis who plays Paul Robinson was given the last line of dialogue. He had asked Herbison for the right before the episode had been written. Herbison revealed "It wasn't a tough decision – he's a legend and he deserves it." The final scene was filmed on Pin Oak Court and was filmed at dusk. Woodburne recalled that it was "our beautiful last scene on Ramsay Street, which we filmed in the fading light." It was the final scene that Dennis, Fletcher and Woodburne filmed together. When the cast and crew had completed the final scene they gathered in their Studio A as they did when they finished production in 2022. Herbison recalled "we all hugged and shed a tear – it was very emotional. [...] For those of us present on both occasions, it was incredibly surreal." He noted that this time the production felt "a sense of gratitude" because of the Amazon era had been "a wonderful bonus".

Herbison chose not to include Christmas episode despite it being broadcast in December. He made filming more practical and the art department an easier job during filming. He noted that he knew there would be pick-up scenes from previous filming blocks that could cause problems. He did not "want anyone melting down over a reindeer" trying to keep continuity or the production having to remove and redress Christmas decorations from sets.

The episode required location filming around the city of Melbourne. Fletcher explained that production were "running all over Melbourne to bring these episodes to life!" He recalled that the final weeks of filming "were a bit of a blur" because of the "sheer scale" that the task of filming became. Herbison chose the filming location for the Robinson Towers development site. He often cycled past the empty plot of land and thought it would be good a choice.

== Story development ==
The episode's main story arc was Ramsay Street facing demolition to make way for a freeway and what the characters will do because of it. They are given the possibility of moving to Shane's new residential development Ramsay Hills or Paul's city high-rise development, Robinson Towers. Herbison decided on this storyline for the end of the series because of the imminent loss of their filming studios. He told Daniel Kilkelly from Digital Spy that he decided to create a threat to Ramsay Street but revisited a storyline about the criminal family, the Linwells and connected the two plot arcs. Herbison told TV Week's Lucy Croke that neither Paul or Shane "anticipated the freeway project or the residents of Ramsay Street having to move, but, since that appears to the case, it becomes a battle to entice them to their respective new precincts." The community is divided and Fletcher, who plays Karl, told Tom Spilsbury from TV Choice that the main notion of the episode is "what is going to happen to the Ramsay Street residents?" Woodburne added that in the end there are three possibilities for the characters, moving to Ramsay Hills, Robinson Towers or staying to fight for Ramsay Street. She added that "Susan is very much in the 'stay and fight' camp" but Karl believes they cannot win and should move on. Herbison described Susan as "the heart of Ramsay Street", and said that while the future looks "grim", she receives information at the last moment that changes things for her. Woodburne described "lovely scenes" towards the end of the episode in which a sense of hope is given. She explained that it aims to give the impression the character lives together are not over and that the show itself is not. Woodburne told Inside Soap's Timms that "everyone's story is jam-packed" and her character's final moment on-screen is "quite gentle" and "really beautifully placed". Fletcher noted the final episodes were full of community spirit and support that by the ending, it gets to a "really lovely, emotional place", adding, "I think it's the perfect full stop."

The episode features a storyline focusing on "The Ramsay/Robinson feud", two warring families which throughout the show's history provided a foundation for conflict for writers to incorporate into the series. Of why he chose this story to pivot the episode, Herbison told Hughes "I'm a big believer in honouring the history of the show" and "it felt full-circle to come back to it." He wanted to bring back all of Paul's children back for the finale but it did not work out. He thought it would be fun to have Jimmy and Max Ramsay (Ben Jackson) playing rivals from the younger generations of both families. Herbison added they are "chips off the old block and the next generation." He viewed this type of rivalry as a classic Neighbours storyline, noting that in the previous finale, Mike Young (Guy Pearce) and Clive Gibbons (Geoff Paine) sparring "was old-school Neighbours". He added "the hijinks here are intentional throwbacks to the style of the '80s." Fletcher added it was "beautifully crafted" because it brings back rivalries that existed when the show began in 1985.

The episode also features fan-service content. Herbison told Croke that "there are also a few Easter eggs for the fans. Annalise almost breaks the fourth wall at one point – see if you can guess what she's talking about!" He was alluding to a scene in which Annalise appears to be talking about fellow Australian soap opera, Home and Away. Matt Wilson who plays Aaron was the only cast member to notice the reference during filming. The episode also pays tribute to the previous finale via certain scenes and dialogue. Herbison revealed that he "loved" the episode and believed it was "very fresh in everyone's minds". Since history repeated itself it felt correct to acknowledge it in the scripts, adding "some of the references are more subtle than others."

In the episode, it is also revealed that Melanie and Vic Stone (Craig Hall) are living a happy life running their pub in Gippsland. Cowden told Michael Adams from Radio Times that "that's a good thing, because I think it's nice for people to know that Mel's happy and loved, because she had such a terrible time, didn't she?"

The characters of Andrew and Wendy were not given a full conclusion to their relationship separation storyline. They broke up following Andrew's affair with Holly, and Holly had miscarried Andrew's child in a previous episode. Herbison would have played their story alternatively had the show continued with Holly having the baby and the Rodwells navigating this. He believed "It's way too soon for Wendy to forgive Andrew, so I left it on an ambiguous note."

== Promotion and broadcast ==
Spoilers regarding the episode were fed via cast interviews in the build up to the finale. More detailed advance spoilers and promotional photographs were released on 4 December 2025. Jackie Woodburne and Alan Fletcher were featured on the front page of Australian television magazine TV Week with the text "Goodbye Neighbours" imposed over the top of them.

Episodes 9363 premiered in the United Kingdom on Amazon Prime Video at 7 AM. In Australia, the episode was broadcast the same day in an hour long format combining Episodes 9362 and 9363. It premiered on Network 10 in their 8:40 PM timeslot.

== Reception ==
=== Scepticism ===
Neighbours having a second finale episode was met with scepticism from the media because of the grandeur of the previous supposed finale. Seven News media analyst Rob McKnight opined "unlike the first finale, don't expect to see original stars to turn up for goodbye cameos, the show is more likely to go out with a whimper after what was a fantastic final episode." Stuart Heritage from The Guardian wrote that it was "almost impossible to imagine it getting a second starry finale." He noted that the previous one "was a big deal", "a near-perfect send off" and "a pretty good finale" that attracted the returns of its highest profile former actors. Heritage believed that this left Neighbours with limited options for a second finale. He predicted that former cast members such as Kylie Minogue would not risk their reputations by returning again. Heritage thought the only viable option was to end the show on "the route of harrowing finality", adding "nothing short of total destruction will do." Anna Spargo-Ryan from The Guardian shared a similar view. She cried during the 2022 finale and added "it really felt complete, finished, even perfect." She thought that with the new finale "maybe now, point proven, we can all find the perfect blend – fond memories and some well-earned rest."

Simon Atkinson and Tiffanie Turnbull from BBC News wrote that the show had a "star-studded death in 2022", while Herbison commented that "the feeling is very deja vu". He acknowledged the criticism about the show's revival, but he viewed it as worthwhile. Atkinson and Turnbull added that Herbison knew he could not compete with the show's previous finale.

=== Ratings ===
Episode 9363 was watched by 448,000 viewers, with an average of 211,000, when it aired in Australia, making it the third most watched show on Network 10 that night and reaching the Overnight Top 30 Programs. It was also the second most watched 10 show with people aged 25–54 and 19th overall. For people aged 16–39, it was the third most watched 10 show and 23rd overall.

=== Critical analysis ===
A writer from TV Choice chose Episode 9363 as the "must see" episode of the week. TV Week editor Amber Giles commented "The time has come, once again, to bid farewell to Australia's iconic drama Neighbours." While reviewing the final episodes, writer Lucy Croke stated: "as Paul and Shane's battle rages and the Kennedys face a new emergency, one truth becomes clear: endings aren't always tragic – sometimes they're simply the sign it's time to move on." Sarah Ellis from Inside Soap observed it was a case of "hankies at the ready" as the soap came to "an emotional end again". She added "as Neighbours comes to a close, residents past and present gather to honour the Ramsay Street legacy."

Siobhan Duck of the Sunday Territorian observed that the show did not try to outdo the previous finale and fill the episode "with another conga line of cameos." Instead, Duck felt that the episode was "much quieter" and "a nostalgic bookend to the show's early years" with "a battle between original rivals the Robinsons and the Ramsays", as Paul and Shane compete to get the residents to move to their respective housing developments. Duck added in a larger review published in The Advertiser that at one point Susan declares she feels "a strong sense of déjà vu at the prospect of bidding a tearful farewell to her beloved Erinsborough. And she's not the only one." Duck's colleague James Wigney gave the episode a mixed review, writing "it's been said that a soufflé doesn't rise twice – and so it proves with this sweet, but ultimately flat farewell to the latest incarnation of the long-running Aussie soap." Wigney felt the episode was primarily aimed at "devoted fans", and that casual viewers who watched the 2022 finale would probably be disappointed and perhaps confused by the "calibre" of the returning characters. He said that true to the serial's history "there's melodrama right until the very end", before adding: "After four decades and more than 9000 episodes, it's a shame to see Neighbours go out with a whimper rather than a bang, but it's cultural impact will live on long after the final credits roll."

The Gold Coast Bulletin's Andrew Potts lamented the loss of Neighbours, calling it "a major blow to the local entertainment industry". He felt that the final episode was not just "a sad occasion" for fans of the show, but also for "the state of the Australian film and television industry" as it was losing one of the major training grounds for actors and those working behind the cameras. He quipped "Saying goodbye to Erinsborough, the Robinsons, Ramsays and Kennedys is sad, but the impact on the industry is a tragedy. The Gold Coast has plenty of cul-de-sacs which would be a great setting for a future series."

Stephen Patterson from Metro thought it was impossible to top the previous finale and thought Neighbours were correct to refrain from trying. Patterson assessed that it paid tribute to the Amazon era instead. He liked the episode's storyline imitated reality with Ramsay Street's future uncertain, which created "a great sense of emotion" for both the characters and viewers. Patterson described the final scene as "deliciously meta", noting Susan's determination to save Ramsay Street is exactly how fans feel about saving the show. He concluded that it was a fitting ending to the series which would allow it to return again, and moreover "the new ending serves the show well."#

Michael Adams from Radio Times knew "the final storyline would be somewhat muted" and did not expect A-list cast returns or national celebration like before. Adams was saddened that the episode felt rushed and believed Amazon could have financed the episode better by doubling its run-time. He was disappointed Holly and the Rodwell's story had no conclusion but acknowledged their affair was so immense that the aftermath could have filled six more months of episodes. He noted a scene between Wendy and Remi did give viewers hope of a reconciliation. Adams thought that new characters took up too much screen-time before the finale and "a lot more could've been sacrificed for a more emotionally satisfying farewell". Adams praised the inclusion of Susan's "iconic monologue" from the previous finale because it was just as impactful. He commended the returning characters and was "pleasantly surprised" they each had dialogue despite the episode being short. He liked the show's final scene but predicted an uproar from fans over the unresolved Erinsborough redevelopment plot. Adams also worried that the open ending would give viewers false hope about a revival and prompt them to continue campaigning for Neighbours' return. Adams would welcome another revival but thought it unlikely and concluded "I hope that there is at least some comfort found in this ambiguity."

Daniel Kilkelly from Digital Spy felt that the final episode "was always going to be a more low-key affair" compared to the 2022 finale, but that it was not necessarily a bad thing. He noted that the "big-name returnees" almost overshadowed that finale as the major storylines had been wrapped up, but it was not repeated this time as the "high-stakes storylines" continued until the end. Kilkelly wrote the threat of the freeway to Ramsay Street was "an effective – if unsubtle – metaphor for the threat facing Neighbours itself following Amazon's decision not to renew the iconic soap after closing its Freevee service." He thought the tone of the episode was actually "optimistic, hopeful and – dare we say – defiant", as if everyone hoped that they might be back in some way in the future. Kilkelly praised Woodburne for giving "a perfectly-pitched, moving performance", and the episode's focus on the Amazon era instead of going heavy on the 1980s nostalgia. Kilkelly concluded that the unique way of ending the show by "throwing out the rule-book" led to more possibilities for a future Neighbours return, perhaps in a different location and with less cast and episodes. Joshua Haigh from News.com.au applauded that "the finale started with a very meta intro, as iconic character Susan pondered in her kitchen." He branded it an "emotional finale" that spurned two potential spin-off series, adding "it seems the door has once again been left open."

Margaret Paul from ABC News was in disbelief that Episode 9363 meant the end of Neighbours. She expected the finale would be "less showy" than its predecessor and noted a sad tone running from the beginning of the episode. Paul believed some story elements of the episode felt rushed such as Krista's pregnancy and the Rodwell family drama. She also stated that the club remix version of the Neighbours theme tune was not as good as its saxophone version used in the 1990s.

Louise Rugendyke from The Age had a negative perception of the episode because the previous finale had "some joy about it" coupled with "the star power of returning faces." She noted that in comparison, Episode 9363 "felt muted" and hindered the casual viewers enjoyment because of the focus on new characters. Rugendyke added that despite the episode featuring "soapie staples" including a pregnancy announcement and family reunions, overall "it felt like a funeral". She criticised the party scene in The Waterhole because it "felt forced" and branded the music overlay a "truly terrible remix of the theme song." Rugendyke's overall assessment of the episode was "it was like watching the death of Australian drama in real time." She concluded that she was sad to see Neighbours end she was just mad unlike when she watched the previous finale and cried.
