= Reece Sinclair =

Fictional character from the Australian soap opera Neighbours

- Neighbours character
- Portrayed by: Mischa Barton
- First appearance: 18 September 2023
- Last appearance: 23 November 2023
- Introduced by: Jason Herbison
In-universe information
- Other names: Reece Peters
- Occupation: Investor in Lassiter's Hotel
- Father: Conrad Sinclair
- Half-sisters: Krista Sinclair

Reece Sinclair is a fictional character from the Australian television soap opera Neighbours, played by Mischa Barton. She made her first appearance during the episode broadcast on 18 September 2023. Barton was cast as Reece after producers approached her with the part. Barton admitted that she had previously declined some Neighbours roles as she didn't see them fitting for her. Reece is an American businesswoman whose family has invested in Lassiter's Hotel. Executive producer Jason Herbison hoped that Reece's introduction, which came upon the Neighbours reboot with Amazon Freevee, would attract new international audiences to the serial. Despite historically being reserved for regular characters, Barton cameoed in the show's opening titles.

Barton's character is described as the eldest daughter of business tycoon Conrad Sinclair, and as hard-working, dynamic and unpredictable. When Reece arrives in Erinsborough, she begins an unforeseen relationship with Byron Stone (Xavier Molyneux). Barton called her intimate scenes with Molyneux intense, and Molyneux explained that they both had to go through the Neighbours intimacy team to prepare for their scenes. As their relationship progressed, Barton worried that Reece's feelings for Byron were not genuine as it was revealed that Reece had actually come to Erinsborough in search of her younger half-sister, Krista Sinclair (Majella Davis). Barton departed the serial on 23 November 2023.

== Creation and casting ==
Before the reboot of Neighbours in episode 8904, following Neighbours: The Finale, it was announced on 17 May 2023 that British-American actress Mischa Barton would be joining after being cast in the role of Reece Sinclair. Barton revealed that producers had approached her with the role and she accepted, however she admitted that she had not yet watched the serial, but was "familiar with it, probably the same things that most people recognise about the show, like Kylie Minogue." Barton explained that she was very intrigued by the role and thought that it was appropriate for her. She teased online to social media that her first days of filming had gone "great" and told fans, "I can't wait for you guys to see it. There's lots of drama to come, so see you all soon". Neighbours had approached Barton with roles in the past, but Barton admitted that she either did not believe the role suited her or thought it was the wrong time for her to come to Australia.

Barton revealed her excitement of being part of "this iconic show's next chapter". She told Digital Spy that she was interested in playing Reece and saw it as a cool role to "explore and play with". The executive producer of Neighbours, Jason Herbison, explained that production had created the character due to the show's switch to streaming service Amazon Freevee. He said, "With Neighbours launching on Amazon Freevee in North America, we are beyond excited to have an actor of Mischa's calibre join us for the beginning of this exciting new chapter." The British-American actress' inclusion was hoped to help bridge new international viewers to the serial. Barton's addition to the cast was described as an extended guest role, though she featured in the opening titles.

== Development ==
=== Characterisation ===
Reece was first branded by official Neighbours production as "an American new to Erinsborough who’s not quite who she appears to be". Herbison called Reece "dynamic and unpredictable", adding that she would appeal to "loyal viewers". He further said that "Reece has got a suitcase of secrets!" and teased that her stint would involve a combination and twists and turns. He added, "Her character herself goes on a journey. She is touched by the lives of everyone here in Erinsborough and then, ultimately, down the track finds out much more, that she was never expecting to ever find there." Herbison also saw Reece's introduction as a way for a "new viewer to see the world". Barton described Reece as coming from a "very very structured, very kind of corporate-y, business-y background" as she is the daughter of American businessman, Conrad Sinclair, who had recently invested in Lassiter's Hotel.

Conrad sends Reece to Erinsborough to look over his investment. Barton explained that Reece was excited to come to Australia as she had "never really had a chance to take a break from work and get away from her family; she's never had a chance to live a normal life and not be under her father's strict guidance". Furthermore, she said that her character sees her trip as a way to relax, which she had "not been doing what she's supposed to be doing!" In the online series Ramsay Street Revelations, Barton quipped Reece as "cool. She's interesting. She's quite a bossy lady because she's worked very hard her whole life and she comes from a privileged background. Talking to Digital Spy, Barton believed that the writers had created the role of Sinclair while keeping her in mind, adding that it helped her memorise her lines. Barton further branded Reece as a strong "woman in business who doesn't like to take any shit", noting that her behaviour would irritate Lassiter's owner, Paul Robinson (Stefan Dennis). Of Reece and Paul's feud, Barton explained, "Paul immediately feels extremely threatened by the fact that Reece has more to do with the money side of things".

=== Relationship with Byron Stone ===
Reece is first seen in Episode 8904, waiting to be served at the Lassiter's reception. Paul asks bell porter Byron Stone (Xavier Molyneux) to escort Reece to her room, however while in the lift, they pursue a sexual liaison that continues into the bedroom. Barton described these scenes by saying, "On my first day, I was pretty much sent into some pretty serious scenes with Xavier." She called it "quite a lot right off the bat, so that was a little bit funny, but we laugh about it now". Molyneux also added that it was hard to wrap his head around the "intimate scenes with Mischa Barton". Reece and Byron officially declare themself dating, however keep it secret to avoid workplace complications. Barton said that Byron was "a bit of escapism for Reece, that's for sure". Due to Reece's background, Barton thought that the relationship was abnormal in that Reece did not expect to "fall for the bell boy, but, hey! These things happen!" Barton questioned the genuineness of Reece's feelings for Byron and thought it would be hard for two people from "completely different worlds" to commit to a relationship with each other.

Of working with Barton during the storyline, Molyneux explained, "We both came into this trying to find our feet and find our characters. So a lot of the time we were leaning on each other to get through the days, because we did have a lot of two-handers where it was just us." He admitted that he found scenes between Reece and Byron "quite intimidating" at the beginning, but Barton's experience in acting helped him.

Storyline-wise, Byron is working at the hotel and comes across Reece. She's staying there at the hotel and they have a bit of a spark. They have their own little romance, which they try to keep to themselves and try to keep it away from the Ramsay Street chaos.

— Xavier Molyneux

Molyneux called intimate scenes between Reece and Byron "hot and heavy". He explained that he and Barton needed to "figure out exactly how we fit together and what chemistry we do have" in order to make Reece and Byron's relationship seem realistic, so went through the Neighbours intimacy team, which Molyneux called "fantastic". Reece's identity as a Sinclair is eventually revealed and she begins witnessing "the unprofessional behaviour of Lassiter's", to the detriment of Paul. Paul becomes suspicious that Reece is hiding something from him and is "stunned" to find Reece and Byron kissing, before he exposes and opposes their relationship. Dennis told Inside Soap that Paul "thoroughly dislikes Reece – and when he sets out to make somebody's life a misery, he does it well!" Paul accuses Reece of engaging with Byron's escorting, a service he previously provided. Reece, unaware of this past job, questions Byron and forces him to explain himself.

=== Sister and departure ===
It was revealed on 2 October 2023 that the true reason for Reece's arrival in Erinsborough was to search for her missing sister, Krista Sinclair (Majella Davis). She told Inside Soap, "We find out that she's really in Australia because of her sister, and there's a lot going on there." To social media, she explained that Reece had come to Australia "out of concern for her younger sister". Although it is initially thought that Krista is dead, she is eventually found alive and Reece bonds with her while she is in hospital.

By October 2023, Barton revealed that she had concluded filming her stint and that Reece would be departing Erinsborough shortly. The spoiler for the episode broadcast on 27 November 2023 teased, "Byron struggles with a loss." This prompted speculation that Barton's character would break up with Byron and soon exit Erinsborough. The following episode, Reece is forced to leave Erinsborough after her father suffers a stroke in America. In an interview with On Demand Entertainment, Barton said that she believed that the producers had "left it very open-ended", with Reece having left "a lot of things behind in Australia", so she thought a return to the serial in the future would be possible. Barton exited the serial on 23 November 2023. A Neighbours Twitter post confirmed that this would be the end of Reece's ten-week-long appearance in the serial, before thanking her for her "incredible guest stint". Barton was removed from the show's opening titles the following episode.

== Storylines ==
Reece stands at the reception of Lassiter's Hotel and is ignored by employee Holly Hoyland (Lucinda Armstrong Hall). Owner Paul Robinson apologises to Reece and warns Holly, before asking Byron Stone to help take bags to Reece's room. In the lift, Reece seduces Byron and they later have sex in her room. Holly later goes into Reece's room and uses her perfume. In the lobby, Reece recognises her perfume on Holly and accuses her of stealing her belongings. Byron later discovers that Reece's actual last name is Sinclair and says that their affair must discontinue. Lucy Robinson (Melissa Bell) recognises that Reece is a Sinclair and explains to Paul that her family is the new silent American investor in the hotel. During a tour of Lassiter's, Reece sees Holly and she expresses her anger, before firing her. When Reece discovers that Paul is using Holly's help to set up an event despite her unemployment, she yells at him. Holly apologises to Reece, who then reluctantly gives Holly her job back.

Reece and Byron's relationship is reignited. Reece begins snooping through the Lassiter's lost property and finds a sun necklace that matches her moon necklace. She then pretends to be doing some marketing research and asks for information on a list of guests. Tess Carmichael (Anica Calida) visits Reece and tells her that she is working too slowly, before Reece reveals to Byron that she has come to Erinsborough to find her sister, Krista Sinclair. Reece finds Krista's car and inside sees a self-help card. Reece explains to Byron that Krista experienced drug addiction issues, but when Paul finds the self-help card in Reece's bedroom, he assumes she is the one with the drug issues and begins questioning her. When Reece uncovers Krista's potential location, she and Byron go on a road trip to find her, however no one they encounter recognises Krista. At a motel however, Reece and Byron find a photo of Krista with Holly and Holly's ex-boyfriend, Eden Shaw (Costa D'Angelo).

Reece discovers that Krista died the previous year when Melanie Pearson (Lucinda Cowden) pushed her in the Lassiter's pool and she accidentally hit her head. Reece calls her father to inform him and tells Paul that she will never forgive him upon learning he covered up her death. A few days later, it is discovered that Krista is alive. Reece bonds with her in the hospital, before receiving a call that their father has had a stroke and is in surgery. Reece tells Byron that she has to leave. Before bumping into Paul and telling him that she hopes he goes to prison, Reece tells Byron that she loves him and departs in a taxi for the airport. Conrad later dies and Reece writes Byron a break-up letter.

== Reception ==
"Reece has certainly made an impression in the show's first two weeks, embarking on a saucy fling with hotel porter Byron, and immediately making an arch-enemy of villain Paul Robinson!"

— Sarah Ellis of Inside Soap on Reece.

Daniel Kilkelly of Digital Spy praised Neighbours when it was revealed that Reece came to Erinsborough to find her sister and not to just meddle with the hotel, calling it a "welcome shift" in storyline. He further said that it was a "personal plot which allowed Mischa Barton's character to finally show a softer side". Stephen Patterson from Metro said that Barton was "doing some of her finest work to date as the enigmatic newcomer who swiftly becomes a thorn in Paul Robinson's side". He also described Reece's introduction as setting the cat among the pigeons. Whilst Virgin Radio called Barton's character fascinating, writer Laura Masia from The Pedestrian dubbed Barton "the big name of the show" upon its reboot and said that Reece was "shrouded in mystery".

TL;DR Movie Reviews quipped Barton's casting a "curve ball", but commended Neighbours writers for introducing her to attract a larger international audience. The Sydney Morning Herald said that Reece's arrival made Neighbours seem like an episode of The Sopranos, and Sarah Ellis, writing for Inside Soap, said that Reece was "reminiscent of a lot of strong, female soap characters from shows such as Dallas and Dynasty". Patterson said that Reece's departure left him "crying". Radio Times' Helen Daly wrote that "the biggest talking point of the new episodes is the arrival of Reece", while the i wrote that her "so-far enigmatic character, Reece Sinclair, makes an entrance of which Alexis Colby would be proud and (just like that Dynasty doyenne) promptly seduces Byron the bell boy."
