= Episode 8904 (Neighbours) =

- Neighbours episode
- The episode's cliffhanger reveals that Toadie Rebecchi (Ryan Moloney) is marrying Terese Willis (Rebekah Elmaloglou). The storyline was constructed when executive producer Jason Herbison realised that the two had "never actually looked twice at each other" over many years on the show together, and that their unexpected relationship would intrigue viewers.
- Directed by: Kate Kendall
- Written by: Jason Herbison
- Cinematography by: Henry Pierce
- Editing by: Kylie Robertson
- Original air date: 18 September 2023
- Running time: 25 minutes

Guest appearances
- Guy Pearce as Mike Young; Mischa Barton as Reece Sinclair; Ian Smith as Harold Bishop; Melissa Bell as Lucy Robinson; Lesley Baker as Angie Rebecchi; Ariel Kaplan as Imogen Willis; Tim Phillipps as Daniel Robinson; Morgan Baker as Callum Rebecchi; Lucinda Cowden as Melanie Pearson (uncredited)

Episode chronology
← Previous "Neighbours: The Finale"	Next → Episode 8905

Episode 8904, also branded as the premiere episode of Neighbours: A New Chapter, is the first episode of the Australian television soap opera Neighbours to be released following its return from cancellation. It premiered on 18 September 2023 and was released through Network 10 in Australia, and Amazon Freevee in the UK and USA. The episode was written by the serial's executive producer, Jason Herbison, and directed by Kate Kendall. Although Neighbours had been off-screen for a little over a year, the production team decided to set its return two years after the events of "Neighbours: The Finale", with the events of the interim period for multiple characters positioned as mysteries to be revealed in subsequent episodes.

The plot of the episode revolves around an upcoming wedding, which is revealed in the episode's closing moments to be between the long-running characters Terese Willis (Rebekah Elmaloglou) and Toadie Rebecchi (Ryan Moloney), who had not previously shared any significant on-screen interaction. This storyline subverts the endings given to both characters in the previous episode, where Toadie married Melanie Pearson (Lucinda Cowden) and Terese reunited with her husband Paul Robinson (Stefan Dennis). Meanwhile, a new family moves into the show's central setting of Ramsay Street, and Byron Stone (Xavier Molyneux) pursues a sexual liaison with mysterious hotel guest Reece Sinclair (Mischa Barton).

Media coverage of the episode focused on the series' unexpected revival, the narrative challenges of its resumption after its well-received ending the previous year, and the promised "twist" to the wedding. Neither participant of the wedding was revealed prior to the episode's release. Reviews of the episode were mostly positive, with praise given to the series' consistency of tone despite its change to a multinational network, and the development of various characters' circumstances over the two year narrative gap. Some reviews were, however, more critical of the narrative developments since the finale and the episode's significant use of exposition. After the episode was shown, the show further publicised the plans for Terese and Toadie as a couple and the potential for further storylines allowed by their partnership.

== Plot ==
Remi, Cara, JJ and Dex Varga-Murphy drive into Ramsay Street after renting 24 Ramsay Street from Jane Harris. Jane greets them at the house prior to attending a wedding, after which she is due to fly to the UK to meet her partner, Mike Young, for a holiday. At 28 Ramsay Street, Harold Bishop is visiting Karl and Susan Kennedy, while Karl's daughter Holly Hoyland has also moved in. Harold laments that his Ramsay Street history book has not been updated since his last visit two years ago. (Note: As shown in "Neighbours: The Finale".) Having returned home at 3:00 am, Holly rushes to work at Lassiters Hotel, where she is distracted by her friends Mackenzie Hargreaves and Sadie Rodwell. Paul Robinson notices her lack of attention to guest Reece Sinclair and asks Byron Stone to intervene. When they are alone, it is revealed that Byron and Reece are conducting an affair. Paul sees Terese Willis, whom he married several years previously, and assures his sister, Lucy, that he is content with his choices. (Note: The following episode clarifies that Paul jilted Terese a year previously at their vow renewal.)

At 22 Ramsay Street, Terese prepares for her wedding day with the help of her daughter, Imogen, her son-in-law, Daniel Robinson, and Susan. Terese's younger daughter, Piper, has declined to attend the ceremony, and Susan also privately expresses misgivings to Karl. Terese is also troubled by finding reminders of her and her fiancé's romantic pasts. (Note: It is later shown that these reminders are being planted by Toadie's daughter, Nell.) At 30 Ramsay Street, Melanie Pearson finds a wedding gift for Terese and reminisces with Toadie Rebecchi over their wedding day. (Note: The following episode reveals that this scene is a flashback to the day of Terese and Paul's vow renewal.) JJ expresses a surprising interest in the history of Ramsay Street, much to Harold's delight, while Byron muses over how little he knows about Reece and Paul thanks his present family members for their support. At the wedding ceremony, attended by the street's residents, it is revealed that Terese is marrying Toadie.

== Regular cast appearances ==
- Lucinda Armstrong Hall as Holly Hoyland
- Emerald Chan as Sadie Rodwell
- Stefan Dennis as Paul Robinson
- Rebekah Elmaloglou as Terese Willis
- Alan Fletcher as Karl Kennedy
- Annie Jones as Jane Harris
- Tim Kano as Leo Tanaka
- Candice Leask as Wendy Rodwell
- Ryan Moloney as Toadfish Rebecchi
- Xavier Molyneux as Byron Stone
- Shiv Palekar as Haz Devkar
- Naomi Rukavina as Remi Varga-Murphy
- Georgie Stone as Mackenzie Hargreaves
- Sara West as Cara Varga-Murphy
- Lloyd Will as Andrew Rodwell
- Jackie Woodburne as Susan Kennedy
- Riley Bryant as JJ Varga-Murphy
- Tanner Ellis-Anderson as Hugo Rebecchi
- Henrietta Graham as Sam Young
- Nikita Kato as Abigail Tanaka
- Ayisha Salem-Towner as Nell Rebecchi
- Marley Williams as Dex Varga-Murphy

== Production ==
=== Conception ===
On 28 July 2022, Neighbours aired "Neighbours: The Finale" as the final episode of Neighbours, accumulating over 1.4 million viewers. Following the public and media attention surrounding the finale, it was announced on 17 November 2022 that Fremantle and Amazon Freevee had reached a deal that would allow Neighbours production to restart in 2023. No agreement had been reached for the series to continue at the time of the finale's broadcast, though discussions with five potential broadcast partners (including Amazon) were ongoing at this point. The production team accordingly planned to leave the series in a position where it could be returned to in the future. Jones revealed that the serial would not be changing its format to appeal to new international audiences, saying that "we didn't change it to appeal to the UK audience – they loved us for who we are – so we're hoping that the Americans feel the same way." Regular production recommenced on 17 April 2023, though scenes featuring Jones and Pearce were filmed in the UK earlier in the year.

Jason Donovan, who reprised his role as Scott Robinson in the 2022 finale, said that he was "thrilled to hear" about the reboot and praised the serial by saying, "Neighbours has helped shine a light on Australian culture, provided endless opportunities for our industry and kept fans entertained for decades!" Kylie Minogue, who also returned in the finale as Charlene Robinson, was "baffled" by the show's reboot due to the high effort put into the finale. She was excited about Pearce's return due to his performance in the finale, in which he, according to Mingoue, "had like a million scenes and I felt bad that I was just kind of on and off and said two words!" Margot Robbie told Studio 10's Angela Bishop that she was "so happy" for its return. Dennis told Bishop that he was not excited for the return, but was rather pleased by it, while Fletcher revealed that he first thought when he heard of the reboot about the "hundreds of people who would get their jobs back". Lucinda Cowden said that she felt in suspense between hearing about Neighbours being revived and being invited back. She also expressed the hardship of not being able to tell her family during Christmas that she was in fact returning to the show. Before it was revealed that he would star in the reboot, Guy Pearce said that it was hard for him to rewatch the 2022 finale as he knew that there would now be more episodes. By returning for the finale, Pearce worried that he had "just inadvertently committed" himself to a four-year stint on the show. He also called the finale a now "rather expensive exercise", while American actor Brad Pitt said that he was "perplexed" by the show's revival. Herbison later stated that although discussions had been taking place whilst the finale episode was being produced, at this point he had envisaged the series as returning years in the future if an agreement was reached. Jamie Lynn, Fremantle’s executive vice president of co-production and distribution, likewise asserted that the cast and crew were unaware of these discussions, describing their approach to the finale as "genuine".

=== Development ===
In discussion with Amazon executives, Herbison and the Neighbours production team decided to begin the new episodes two years after the events of "Neighbours: The Finale", adding an additional year to the period since the show was last broadcast. Heribson stated that "We knew there was going to be a transmission gap, so life for the audience would have gone on and time would have passed for them too." It just felt like a one-off opportunity. In serial dramas, there aren't a lot of things you can do for the first time[...] We felt that it was a great opportunity – and two years felt like a really nice timeline". Woodburne further suggested that events from the two years away would slowly become clear to viewers over time. Kano also praised the narrative potential of moving forward in time, noting the "evolution in the characters, their arcs, and their relationships", and Leo's own experiences as a single father to a three-year-old.

Rukavina, who joined Neighbours in episode 8904, was interviewed by The Guardian for its release day. The interview highlights the Varga-Murphys as the first lesbian parents on the series, placing them within its recent movements towards increased diversity.

At one of my first castings for TV, an agent said to me, ‘You’ll never really work on TV, because we can’t cast you in any family. We can’t see it.’ I was so shocked. You should see my actual family. My mother is Croatian, she’s a 6ft eastern European, she’s pale, she has very classic features. And my dad is Nigerian and he’s quite dark. I’m in the middle. But that’s my family. So what do you mean, you can’t see it?[...] When I got the call [to join Neighbours], the first thing I said to myself, to that casting guy all those years ago, was: ‘Fuck yeah. Taste it.’

— Naomi Rukavinda

Rukavina also indicated the benefits of exploring LGBTQ+ identities in a soap opera format, saying that "to be on a show that’s on four nights a week, where our sons have their own storylines and not everything is about us being queer – we get to do everyday normal stuff that you don’t get time to explore in any other show”. She also praised the producers' willingness to listen to the cast around matters of representation. Heribson further noted that in his time with Neighbours, dissenting voices regarding diverse characters had lessened significantly.

Elmaloglou and Moloney were informed that their characters were to marry shortly before scripts were circulated to the cast, with Elmaloglou flown in from New South Wales specifically to be told in person. Following the episode's premiere, Herbison explained his decision to unite Toadie and Terese, highlighting the storyline's potential to re-engage viewers:

I thought to myself: 'Well, what if two years of the show had played out? What would have happened if we had seen every twist and turn?' Certainly it's very, very possible for unexpected people to get together. With that in mind, I looked at the cast and the characters and it really occurred to me that we had two characters who have been on the show for a very long time that the audience are very invested in, but they've never actually looked twice at each other, and wouldn't it be incredible if those two people had found unexpected love?[...] The question is: 'How did this happen? We last saw Toadie marry Melanie and Terese reconciling with Paul, so how on earth did they find their way to each other?' That's the big story locomotive of the early weeks. We think it's going to be a big shock for the audience there and they are hopefully going to be very, very invested in finding out the answer to this.

— Jason Herbison

Moloney further discussed his determination for the relationship to not be a "gimmick", highlighting the work he and Elmaloglou had done to create a believable couple. Moloney stated that he could see how Toadie and Terese could be right for each other, pointing out that "Toadie is always trying to save people, but for the first time ever he's got this powerful woman who he doesn't have to save at all, who is completely capable. So in that aspect he is just able to love her, have fun with her, lighten up and enjoy life. For Terese, she's always been with somebody who she can never trust or believe. So now she gets somebody who just genuinely loves her and she can trust." Elmaloglou expressed concern that fans would not accept Terese and Toadie as a couple, but asserted that they are "genuinely in love with each other and have got together in a beautiful way". She was also excited for the "challenge" of working closely with Moloney after years acting alongside Dennis.

The events of the episode, in particular Terese and Toadie's wedding, were designed to introduce storylines set to continue in the following weeks. Herbison teased a "big event" that would stem from Toadie and Terese's relationship, and that more would be revealed about Mel's off-screen departure. Similarly, Dennis revealed that there was more to Paul's jilting of Terese than had been shown on-screen, and that his motives were to protect Terese. Moloney suggested that Paul would interfere in Toadie and Terese's marriage. Dennis further opined that "you should always be worried about Paul at some stage". Reflecting on the narrative gap prior to episode 8904, Woodburne stated that "when we learn what's happened in those two years, it's so complex but so beautifully dovetailed into every character and backstory".

=== Cast ===
Long-time actors Stefan Dennis, Alan Fletcher, Jackie Woodburne and Ryan Moloney were the first actors to be confirmed to return, all of whom were informed of the revival when executive producer Jason Herbison visited their houses and asked them to return in-person. Fletcher, Woodburne and Moloney all expressed their pleasure of the revival either during interviews or on social media. Other cast members were not informed prior to the announcement of the show's return. In February 2023, seven more actors were announced as returnees. Rebekah Elmaloglou, Annie Jones, Tim Kano and Georgie Stone were announced as series regulars in the new season, while Melissa Bell and Ian Smith were announced to be returning in guest capacities, along with April Rose Pengilly (as Chloe Brennan). It was also announced that Lucinda Cowden would be returning to the show after Moloney requested, "I definitely would like to see the return of Mel, as otherwise it'd be another death in the family!" Although appearing in Episode 8904, Cowden was not credited in the closing titles. The following episode revealed this scene was a flashback, with Cowden not initially reappearing in new episodes.

Lloyd Will, Candice Leask and Emerald Chan were announced to be reprising their roles of Andrew, Wendy and Sadie Rodwell respectively, who were branded as the "last ever family to move onto Ramsay Street" prior to the finale. Leask commented that at the time, she was unaware of the other cast members who would be returning, but was grateful that Neighbours would be rebooted. As Holly Hoyland, Lucinda Armstrong-Hall was announced to be returning as a regular character via social media. Guy Pearce, who had reprised his role as Mike Young in the finale after a 33-year-long hiatus, was later confirmed to be returning to the serial in a guest capacity, despite his earlier comments on the revival. Pearce pre-empted the official announcement of his return on the Weekend Talks podcast for Australia's Nine Network, where he revealed that he and Jones had discussed their characters' future and stated that "obviously, if I'm going to extricate myself from the show, I want to do it respectfully". It was later announced that Henrietta Graham as Mike's daughter, Sam Young, would also return. The Neighbours production team also cast Shiv Palekar as Hari "Haz" Devkar, who was introduced as the new manager of Harold's Café, before it was announced that Haz's dog, Trevor (Bodie), would also be joining Neighbours, although only first appearing in the third episode of the reboot.

The new Varga-Murphy family, comprising Remi, Cara, Dex and JJ Varga-Murphy, played by Naomi Rukavina, Sara West, Marley Williams and Riley Bryant respectively, was announced by Herbison in June 2023. Of their introduction, Herbison explained, "We are delighted to welcome the Varga-Murphy family to Ramsay Street and the amazing cast portraying them." Herbison called them a beautiful addition to Erinsborough, then teased their "ulterior motive for being in Erinsborough" and the "explosive ramifications" it would have. West said that she was "so honoured to be a part of the new Neighbours legacy and really looking forward to bringing the Varga-Murphy family to Australian and international screens." Rukavina added that she was "trilled" to be part of the soap and offer "diverse and real representations of Australian families". For her first three months filming in the role, Rukavina was also performing in Harry Potter and the Cursed Child each night. Ahead of the new season, it was also announced that Byron Stone would be upgraded to regular character status and recast from Joe Klocek to Xavier Molyneux. Klocek said that with Molyneux, Byron was "in goods hands". It was later revealed that the role was recast as Klocek was unavailable to return, so producers called Molyneux up, who had come second place in the initial audition for Byron.

Due to the two year narrative gap, the characters of Nell and Hugo Rebecchi were recast from Scarlett Anderson and John Turner, to Ayisha Salem-Towner and Tanner Ellis-Anderson respectively. Daniel Kilkelly of Digital Spy reported that producers "naturally had to bring in older actors to play the roles". Moloney, who is Nell and Hugo's on-screen father, revealed that he had "mixed emotions" about the recast, but was grateful that Anderson and Turner would be able to "go and be kids". He explained that, "The content of the stuff that Ayisha has to carry and do, she's pretty phenomenal. I'm loving working with these new guys." In April, it was leaked that Mischa Barton, known from her Hollywood roles in The O.C. and The Hills, was joining the serial as an extended guest character. Barton told the press that she was "excited to be part of this iconic show’s next chapter, and I am really looking forward to being back in Australia, a place I know and love!" Herbison explained that the decision to introduce Barton's character Reece Sinclair was made to help bring in new American viewers to the serial.

Episode 8904 also featured four returning characters whose returns had not been publicly announced prior to the episode's broadcast. These characters were Imogen Willis, Daniel Robinson, Angie Rebecchi and Callum Rebecchi, played by Ariel Kaplan, Tim Phillipps, Lesley Baker and Morgan Baker respectively. These characters were reintroduced to facilitate the wedding between Terese and Toadie. Phillipps later explained that he had been contacted by Neighbours producers and asked to "pop back to the show" for a few episodes. He described feeling "honoured and excited" to return to the serial and thanked Dennis and Kaplan for working with him again. In an exclusive behind-the-scenes segment on 10 News First, Matt Wilson, who previously played Aaron Brennan from 2015 to 2022, was seen on filming on set. This sparked a rumour that Takaya Honda would also return as David Tanaka alongside Wilson, however neither actor appeared in the first episode of the serial. Episode 8904 revealed that Aaron and David moved away from Erinsborough during the time jump after Nicolette Stone (Charlotte Chimes) and Isla Tanaka-Brennan (Mary Finn; Axelle Austin) also moved away. Chimes explained that if Nicolette were to return, she would be recast. This was subsequently revealed to be the case, with Hannah Monson taking over the role of Nicolette, alongside David and Aaron's returns, from November 2023.

An article released by Digital Spy on 22 September 2023 outlined where the characters who did not return in episode 8904 had gone. Producers moved on Glen Donnelly and Kiri Durant, played by Richard Huggett and Gemma Bird Matheson, explaining on-screen that they were now staying at Magnetic Island. Jacinta Stapleton and Freya Van Dyke's absences as Amy Greenwood and Zara Selwyn were explained upon Van Dyke's post to social media, which explained, "At this stage, no, Zara is not going back. It's nothing to do with anything beyond what storylines they've decided to go with." Levi Canning (Richie Morris), Freya Wozniak (Phoebe Roberts) and Geoff Paine (Clive Gibbons) also did not return.

=== Filming ===
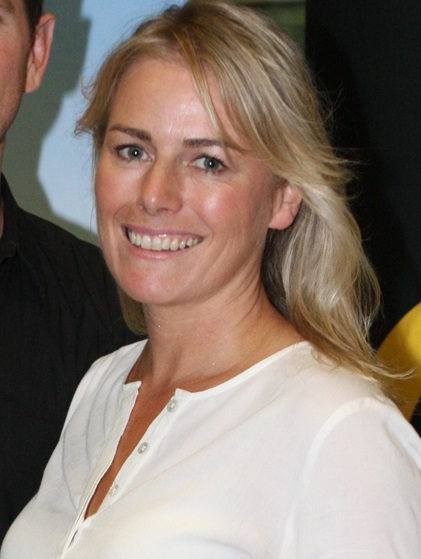
Kate Kendall (pictured), who played Lauren Turner from 2013 to 2022, directed episode 8904.

Following the announcement of Neighbours' return, Herbison spoke to Digital Spy about the initial plans for resuming filming. As indicated by the video announcing the recommission, Herbison confirmed that the interior and exterior sets housed at Nunawading studios had been retained and would be restored for the new episodes. However, at this point the production was exploring a contingency plan for if Pin Oak Court, the location for Ramsay Street, could not be returned to. When production recommenced in April 2023, it was confirmed that Pin Oak Court would remain in use as a central location. Woodburne described her first day of filming with, "Doing my first scene back was emotional, it did feel like coming home. It was lovely."

The first scene of episode 8904 was filmed on Pin Oak Court, the real-life location of Ramsay Street, and was of the new Varga-Murphy family arriving in Erinsborough. Episode 8904 was directed by Kate Kendall, who served as a producer for Neighbours up to its 2022 finale. She also previously appeared in the series as Lauren Turner, a role she last reprised in "Neighbours: The Finale". Kendall explained, "We filmed the first very scene of the new series on Ramsay Street. We were filming the arrival of our new family who are joining the show, so that felt like a really beautiful moment of re-energising things." Upon returning to the unused Lassiters complex set behind the Nunawading studios, Dennis described to The Sunday Post that the area had become overgrown between filming the 2022 finale and episode 8904. He said, "I had to come here a couple of times before we started filming again and this had all become so overgrown; seeing it in such a dilapidated state was very weird. It felt like tumbleweeds going down the corridors. It was so desolate. So, it’s great to be back and have everyone here. It was like putting on some comfortable old shoes. It's the same but different."

== Broadcast and promotion ==
Episode 8904 was the first episode of Neighbours to be released on Amazon Freevee in the UK and USA, following previous British broadcaster Channel 5's decision to end its partnership with the show. It was released nearly 14 months after the Channel 5 finale, which was developed and broadcast to act as the series' final ever episode. In Australia, episode 8904 returned Neighbours to a regular scheduled position on Network 10 for the first time since 2010. Its former slot at 6:30pm on digital channel 10 Peach was retained as a repeat broadcast, with episodes also added to Amazon Prime Video after a one week broadcast window. The episode was released through Amazon Prime Video in Canada and South Africa, where Freevee is not available. Neighbours returned to RTÉ One in the Republic of Ireland. TVNZ retained first broadcast rights in New Zealand, with episodes also added to Amazon Prime Video a week after their initial broadcast. TVNZ 2 broadcast the episode on 19 September, with following episodes continuing to be scheduled the day after their release in other markets.

The episode's promotion began in a Network 10 reel, released in July 2023, that revealed that Neighbours would begin with a surprise wedding. It also included archive footage of Mike and Jane from "Neighbours: The Finale". A promotional trailer for Neighbours' return was released on 1 August 2023, which also announced the release date for episode 8904. The trailer also focused on the wedding and its undisclosed participants, although Ash Percival of Huffington Post noticed that Terese's name was displayed at the ceremony. The trailer showed the first new footage of Mike and Jane, and also foregrounded Barton's appearance. Following the release of promotional stills by Digital Spy in advance of the episode, a viewer posted to Facebook a magnified image of a booklet held by Jane, revealing that Terese and Toadie were the characters getting married.

Episode 8904 concludes with an extended trailer for subsequent episodes. The trailer teased the continuation of storylines begun in the episode, featuring Paul's response to Terese and Toadie's marriage, Reece's secrecy, JJ's interest in Ramsay Street, Mackenzie's attraction to Haz, and Jane and Mike's holiday in England. It also promoted difficulties between Susan and Karl, and a health scare for Harold.

== Reception ==
=== Ratings ===
In Australia, the episode was watched by a total of 122,000 people at the 4:30 pm timeslot. A further 42,000 viewers watched the episode repeat at 6:30 pm on 10 Peach. Episode 8904 failed to make the top 20 programmes watched in metropolitan or regional Australia for that night. Estimates from TV Blackbox approximated a total of 244,000 Australian viewers across both the 4:30 pm and the 6:30 pm broadcasts, as well as those who watched via 10Play and Amazon Freevee, watched episode 8904. This was a 15% increase from the average nightly viewers the serial was experiencing during its 2022 season.

=== Critical response ===
Professional ratings
Review scores
Source	Rating
The Guardian	3/5 stars
i	5/5 stars
Metro	5/5 stars
PerthNow	4.5/5 stars
screenhub.com	3.5/5 stars
Sydney Morning Herald	3.5/5 stars
The Daily Telegraph	3/5 stars
The Times	3/5 stars
TL;DR Reviews	3.5/5 stars

==== Positive analysis ====
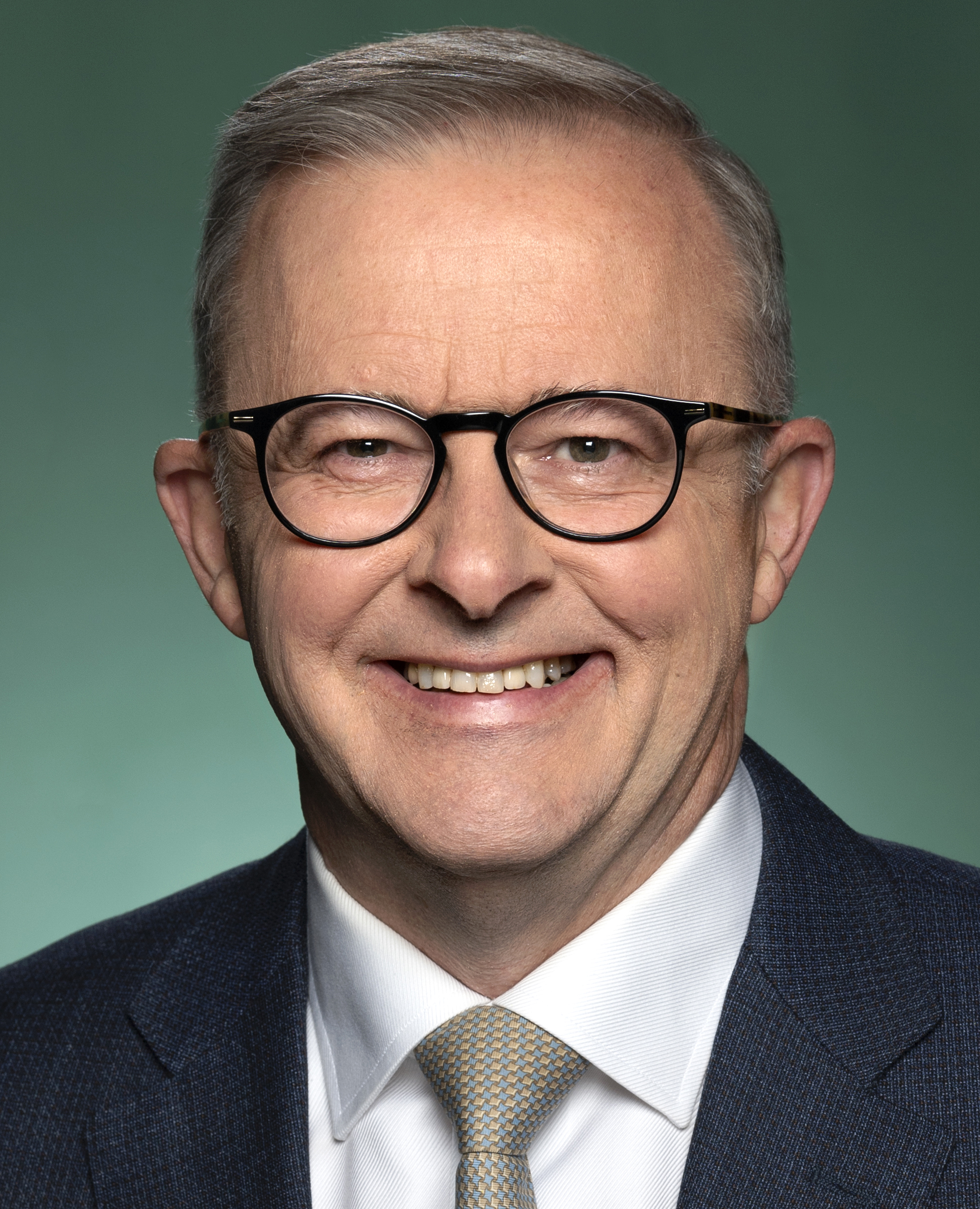
Australian Prime Minister Anthony Albanese (pictured) praised the Neighbours reboot via social media.

Australian Prime Minister Anthony Albanese said on social media that "Neighbours is a part of Australian life" and congratulated the cast and crew for returning to screens. He wished, "So, to all those at Ramsay Street – well done, good to see you back." Television presenter Angela Bishop branded the return as a "historic day for Australian TV". Episode 8904 was featured in segments on Have You Been Paying Attention?, The Cheap Seats, and Gogglebox Australia.

The episode was positively viewed by most newspapers and tabloid media. Helen Daly of Radio Times branded the reboot as "a soap twist with a meaningful reboot", explaining that the revelation of Toadie and Terese's relationship made her gasp, but gave her "a gleeful smile". She explained that she believed Neighbours had successfully taken advantage of the two-year time jump and had executed it "in a smart way". She thought Toadie and Melanie's split "could have genuinely happened", however said that it would take her "a long time" to think of pairing Toadie with Terese. She further applauded the serial's efforts in creating the storyline by calling it shocking, but also "clever and thoughtful". She thought that Reece's introduction was "the biggest talking point of the new episodes" and was a good way of introducing the new American audience to the serial, which she explained had an "invigorated cast, exciting storylines and a new slick and stylish way of working." She summed the episode up as "a bit too much explosion for existing fans, with a couple of clunky questions", but thought that Woodburne's opening like was "the perfect way to introduce us into the new era".

The i's Caroline Frost similarly gave positive appraisal of the episode and claimed that the writers "know what they're doing". She expressed her comfort in seeing Paul, Toadie, Karl and Susan back on her screen mixed in with other characters, such as Reece, whom she described as "so-far enigmatic". Frost criticised Guy Pearce's scenes filmed overseas and presumed that his future appearances would not be filmed "in the same room, or country, as the rest of the cast." While appreciating the "huge efforts" made to "shoehorn in some background context" for the viewers, she also disapproved of the episode seemingly sliding in the new cast members and the "audacious" wedding twist, explaining that she "laughed out loud in delight and was tempted to rewind and watch it all over again." Episode 8904 was described as a "triumphant TV return" by editor Clare Rigden from PerthNow, who expressed that the return gave viewers "everything they could possibly want, with romance and drama aplenty plus THAT wedding surprise." She claimed that this "extraordinary plot twist" of pairing Terese and Toadie delighted fans. Rigden commended Woodburne's opening lines and thought that her narration was fitting with her finale speech. She described the introduction of the Varga-Murphy family as "satisfying", before calling the episode "the perfect blend".

Rusted-on fans and newcomers alike will find much to love about the rebooted Neighbours, which returns to screens with a truly jaw-dropping plot twist this Monday. Honestly, your jaw will be on the floor. That’s all I’ll say: revealing anything more would spoil it, and that would truly be a shame. An on-point return.

— Clare Rigden of The West Australian

A writer for The Telegraph described the time jump as a clever production decision, however claimed that "clunky exposition" has been "crowbarred" into the episode to fill in viewers. He reported that the Neighbours sets had been "glammed up" with "an ambient synth soundtrack." In a review of the reboot, The Times said that episode 8904 proved little would change in the new Neighbours episodes. Tamzin Meyer of Entertainment Daily! branded the episode as the perfect mixture of returning and new characters, which allowed writers to keep the show "current and fresh". Meyer was critical of the way the serial attempted to fill in viewers on the events that had happened during the two-year time jump, saying that it was "a little hard to keep up with". Addressing Toadie and Terese's wedding, she called the episode "rather confusing for both new and old fans as they are left with many gaps that need filling. An explanation for these changes was rather glazed over." Whattowatch.com's Simon Timblick said that even long-term Neighbours fans could not have predicted that Terese and Toadie were getting married, then recapped the episode by saying, "While the first episode of the Neighbours reboot has left long-time fans with more questions than answers, there is no denying that it feels amazing to be back on Ramsay Street."

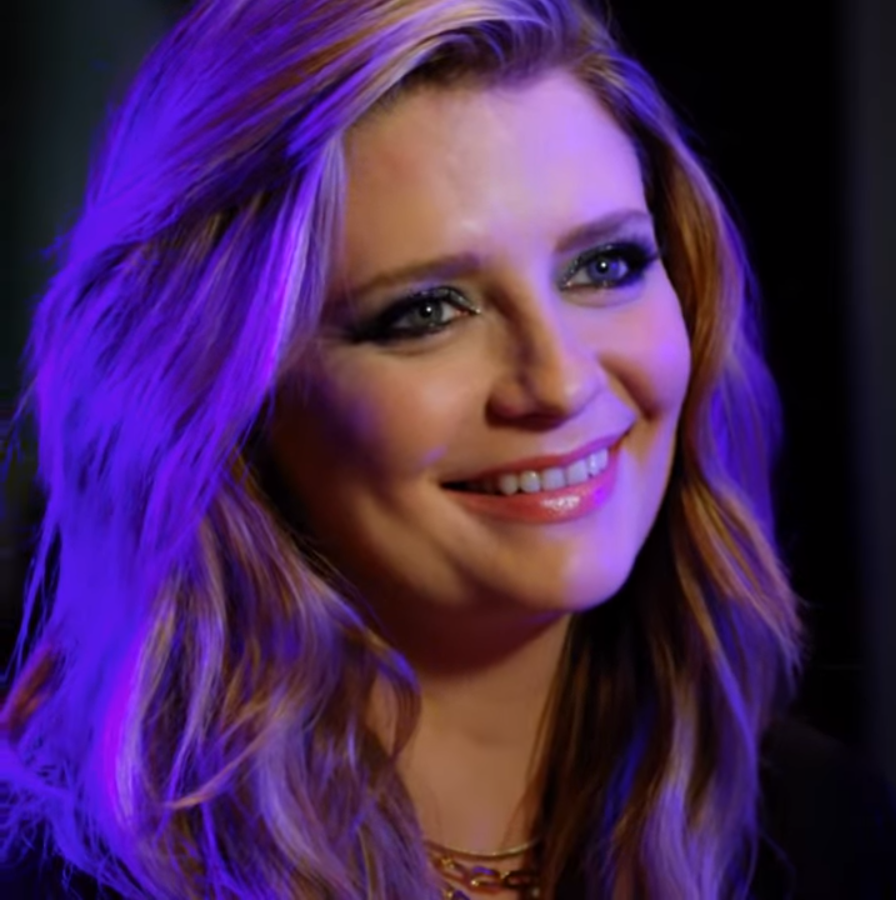
Critics praised Mischa Barton's role of Reece Sinclair in bridging American viewers to the serial.

Writing on behalf of Metro, senior soaps editor Stephen Patterson praised Neighbours for returning to screens "with a bang, serving up a huge twist that has left fans with their jaws on the floor". Patterson believed that the episode "ticked all the boxes", but thought that a wedding between Terese and Paul, rather than Toadie, would have "made perfect sense". He praised the introduction of the Varga-Murphys, Haz and Reece, and said that Molyneux had proved himself worthy of taking over the role of Byron from Joe Klocek. Patterson also applauded the "lavish drama" implemented in the wedding twist, explaining that it had been "very well played". He expressed his concerns over Jane and Mike and how scenes would be filmed whilst making their relationship still seem believable. He quipped the serial's reboot as having been executed "in a truly epic fashion". Laura Masia of The Pedestrian gagged the episode as "a bunch of twists, turns and bonkers surprises along the way". She claimed the wedding was filmed in a way to position the audience to be against Toadie and Terese's relationship. Masia gave appraisal of Mischa Barton's acting and her character's continuous mystique, but called JJ's interest in Ramsay Street a "boring" storyline.

Screenhub.com gave Episode 8904 a 3.5 out of 5 star review. A writer for the site was grateful for the limited change in the show's format and cast, but was sceptical of Harold's quick introduction to the Varga-Murphy family. He expressed his hope that the new 4:30 pm timeslot would introduce a new older and younger audience. Virgin Radio wrote that Alan Fletcher's tease of a "big twist" was an understatement and that Reece's secrecy was fascinating. TL;DR Movie Reviews and Analysis called the episode "full of nostalgia" and acclaimed Herbison's work in "trying to pick up the pieces again". A writer for the website gave credit to producers' efforts in luring in an international customer base by introducing Mischa Barton.

==== Mixed and negative analysis ====
The Sydney Morning Herald's Michael Idato called the soap's reprisal "a risky move", and rebuked the fact that Mike was not living in Ramsay Street and that Harold was "wandering in and out of shot, providing historical details like a museum guide gone rogue." Despite congratulating the efforts of the show's cinematography and production design team, he wrote that the first episode should have been "leaner, sharper and pack more punch". He opined that the editing was lazy and said that only Mischa Barton would attract audiences to the following episode. The Neighbours reboot was likened to Degrassi Junior High by Joel Keller of Decider. The American website conveyed the confusion of new American viewers in determining which characters had previously been in a relationship with each other, but was appreciative of the Varga-Murphy's arrival to fix this. Keller joked that Remi, Cara and Dex Varga-Murphy seemed "just as clueless about the neighborhood as we are" and called some elements of the premiere "goofy", but was intrigued by the serial. Irish Independent writer Chris Wasser branded the reboot as "A clunky, convoluted comeback for the soap that should never have been given a second life".

Author Anna Spargo-Ryan writing through The Guardian said that the first episode was "a little bit awkward" in that it would be hard to plot traditional soap storylines while branding as a streaming show. She was grateful for the returns of many cast members and called the rapid ageing of Nell Rebecchi and Hugo Somers "true soap fashion", which contributed to the "surreal quality" of the episode. The revelation of Toadie as the groom was called "genuinely shocking, even by Erinsborough standards". Spargo-Ryan called Guy Pearce's FaceTime appearance unsurprising and theorised the reasons behind Harold's return, before calling the depicted tension between Karl and Susan typical. In a following article published by The Guardian, editor Scott Bryan claimed that the "maddening Ramsay Street reboot makes absolutely no sense" and criticised the fact that Melanie and Toadie's marriage, the "absolute heart of last year's big finale", had broken down. He called the latter and Terese's pairing "too random" and said that the efforts made in the finale had "evaporated". Summarising, Bryan said, "All of this feels too messy, and not in a good soapy way. At least the soap has one mystery that will keep viewers coming back. What is The OC's Mischa Barton doing there?" A third The Guardian article by Frances Ryan claimed that Episode 8904 would leave fans "shouting at their screens". She compared the reboot to "seeing a distant relative come back from the dead" and questioned why the show was returning after characters were given perfect endings in the finale. While giving the context, Ryan quipped the episode as "an odd mix of nostalgia...and unsettling change" and declared that bringing back Guy Pearce was "the most publicised problem for the writers".
