= List of Neighbours characters introduced in 2023 =

Neighbours is an Australian television soap opera. It was first broadcast on 18 March 1985 and airs on streaming service Amazon Freevee, and Network 10 in Australia. The following is a list of characters that first appear in the show in 2023, by order of first appearance. All characters are introduced by the show's executive producer Jason Herbison. The 39th season of Neighbours commenced with Episode 8904 on 18 September 2023, following a 14-month hiatus prompted by the withdrawal of the show's previous UK broadcaster, Channel 5. The Varga-Murphy family, comprising JJ (Riley Bryant), Cara (Sara West), Remi (Naomi Rukavina) and Dex Varga-Murphy (Marley Williams), along with Reece Sinclair (Mischa Barton) and Haz Devkar (Shiv Palekar), were introduced during the same episode. Haz's dog, Trevor (Bodhi), was introduced two episodes later. Eden Shaw (Costa D'Angelo) arrived in October and Reece's younger half-sister, Krista Sinclair (Majella Davis), in November.

== JJ Varga-Murphy ==
JJ Varga-Murphy
- Neighbours character
- Portrayed by: Riley Bryant
- Duration: 2023–2025
- First appearance: 18 September 2023
- Last appearance: 11 December 2025
- Introduced by: Jason Herbison
In-universe information
- Occupation: Student; Wine bottler at Yorokobi; Casual worker at Eirini Rising
- Father: Felix Rodwell
- Mother: Cara Varga-Murphy; Remi Varga-Murphy
- Brothers: Dex Varga-Murphy
- Grandfathers: Ken Obasi; Greg Murphy
- Uncles: Taye Obasi; Andrew Rodwell
- Aunts: Chelsea Murphy
- First cousins: Sadie Rodwell; Thomas Murphy
- Other relatives: Maddy Murphy

JJ Varga-Murphy, played by Riley Bryant, made his first appearance on 18 September 2023. JJ is part of a new family that were introduced called the Varga-Murphys. He was joined by his parents Cara (Sara West) and Remi (Naomi Rukavina), with the addition of his brother, Dex (Marley Williams). Rukavina revealed that the Varga-Murphys had formed a "special bond" both on and off screen, while West was happy the family would represent the "beautiful LGBTQIA+ community". The show's executive producer, Jason Herbison, expressed his delight about the introduction of the Varga-Murphy's, which would generate "many new stories to tell". It was later revealed in an interview to Digital Spy that JJ would be searching for his biological father. West explained, "JJ has found out some information. They've all come to Ramsay Street for a holiday, but JJ wants to know more about his biological dad. That leads the family to Ramsay Street, because JJ thinks he lives there."

JJ drives into Ramsay Street with his family after recommending renting 24 Ramsay Street. He meets Nell Rebecchi (Ayisha Salem-Towner) and Sadie Rodwell (Emerald Chan), as well as the latter's father, Andrew Rodwell (Lloyd Will). JJ later reveals to Dex that he recommended Ramsay Street as he believes that Andrew is his biological father, rather than an American donor as his mum, Cara, claims.

== Cara Varga-Murphy ==
Cara Varga-Murphy
- Neighbours character
- Portrayed by: Sara West
- Duration: 2023–2025
- First appearance: 18 September 2023
- Last appearance: 11 December 2025
- Introduced by: Jason Herbison
In-universe information
- Occupation: Carpenter
- Father: Greg Murphy
- Sisters: Chelsea Murphy
- Wife: Remi Varga-Murphy
- Sons: JJ Varga-Murphy; Dex Varga-Murphy
- Nephews: Thomas Murphy
- First cousins: Maddy Murphy

Cara Varga-Murphy, played by Sara West, made her first appearance on 18 September 2023. West's character and casting details were announced on 22 June 2023. Cara is part of a new family that was introduced called the Varga-Murphy's. Cara was introduced alongside her wife Remi (Naomi Rukavina) and their children JJ (Riley Bryant) and Dex (Marley Williams). West stated that she was "honoured" to join the cast and "looking forward" to introducing the Varga-Murphy family. She also hoped the inclusion of the family, fronted by a lesbian couple would "help better reflect the beautiful LGBTQIA+ community" that she proudly comes from. Describing her character, West revealed "Cara has a bold, impassioned love for her family and I love that her intentions have, so far, always been good." The show's executive producer, Jason Herbison revealed that he thought it was appropriate that a new chapter of Neighbours included the arrival of a new family.

Laura Jane Turner and Daniel Kilkelly of Digital Spy selected the Varga-Murphys' arrival as one of the 16 best LGBTQ+ television moments of the year. They praised how the characters had highlighted shifting attitudes towards rainbow families, and stated that Cara and Remi had "the potential to become all-time Ramsay Street greats".

== Remi Varga-Murphy ==
Remi Varga-Murphy
- Neighbours character
- Portrayed by: Naomi Rukavina
- Duration: 2023–2025
- First appearance: 18 September 2023
- Last appearance: 11 December 2025
- Introduced by: Jason Herbison
In-universe information
- Other names: Remi Varga
- Occupation: Doctor
- Father: Ken Obasi
- Half-brothers: Taye Obasi
- Wife: Cara Varga-Murphy
- Sons: JJ Varga-Murphy; Dex Varga-Murphy

Remi Varga-Murphy, played by Naomi Rukavina, made her first appearance on 18 September 2023. Rukavina's character and casting details were announced on 22 June 2023. Remi is part of a new family that was introduced called the Varga-Murphy's. Remi was introduced with her wife Cara (Sara West) and their two children JJ (Riley Bryant) and Dex (Marley Williams). Rukavina stated that she was "thrilled" to join the cast and praised Neighbours for being willing to portray diverse families without a "tokenistic" approach. She added that her prior filming in the role had "been a great adventure" and the Varga-Murphy's have a "special bond". The show's executive producer, Jason Herbison revealed that he thought it was appropriate that a new chapter of Neighbours included the arrival of a new family. In an introductory video posted via the official Neighbours Instagram page, Rukavina revealed that Remi works as a doctor.

Remi and her family drive into Ramsay Street. She meets the neighbours and then helps Mary Ryan (Carissa McPherson) when she chokes, which allows Remi to introduce herself to Karl Kennedy (Alan Fletcher) as a doctor. When Remi realises that Cara Varga-Murphy is struggling to find employment, she approaches Paul Robinson (Stefan Dennis) and convinces him to give Cara a job at Lassiters Hotel.

== Dex Varga-Murphy ==
Dex Varga-Murphy
- Neighbours character
- Portrayed by: Marley Williams
- Duration: 2023–2025
- First appearance: 18 September 2023
- Last appearance: 11 December 2025
- Introduced by: Jason Herbison
In-universe information
- Occupation: Student
- Mother: Cara Varga-Murphy; Remi Varga-Murphy
- Brothers: JJ Varga-Murphy
- Grandfathers: Ken Obasi; Greg Murphy
- Uncles: Taye Obasi
- Aunts: Chelsea Murphy
- First cousins: Thomas Murphy
- Other relatives: Maddy Murphy

Dexter "Dex" Varga-Murphy, played by Marley Williams, made his first appearance on 18 September 2023. Williams' character and casting details were announced alongside the other Varga-Murphys on 22 June 2023. Dex is Williams' first television role. Dex is part of a new family being introduced called the Varga-Murphys. The character was introduced with his parents Cara (Sara West) and Remi (Naomi Rukavina), with the addition of his brother JJ (Riley Bryant). West was empowered by the Varga-Murphys representing the "beautiful LGBTQIA+ community" and Rukavina added that the family had formed a "special bond". The show's executive producer, Jason Herbison expressed his delight about the Varga-Murphy's arrivals, which would create "many new stories to tell".

== Reece Sinclair ==
Reece Sinclair, played by Mischa Barton, made her first appearance on 18 September 2023. The character and Barton's casting details were announced on 17 April 2023. Reece is the first new character to be announced following the revival of the serial. Reece is American and her arrival in town is "far from what it appears to be". Of her casting, Barton stated: "I'm excited to be part of this iconic show's next chapter, and I'm really looking forward to being back in Australia, a place I know and love! I think the character of Reece is going to be a great role for me to explore and play with." Executive producer Jason Herbison described Reece as "dynamic and unpredictable" and believed the show's viewers in Australia and around the world would love her. Barton later admitted that she had never watched the show, but she was familiar with it thanks to Kylie Minogue (who played Charlene Robinson). She also revealed that producers approached her about the role of Reece, and she thought the character was "a very good fit". Reece appeared for a ten-week guest stint, which concluded on 23 November. Posts from the Neighbours social media accounts suggested that she could return in the future.

== Haz Devkar ==
Hari "Haz" Devkar, played by Shiv Palekar, made his first appearance on 18 September 2023. Palekar's character and casting details were announced on 7 June 2023 via the serial's social media accounts. Haz was introduced as the new manager of Harold's Café, and has a dog called Trevor (Bodie). When Haz is introduced into the series, he lives on Ramsay Street at Number 32. Producers included him in a house share concept alongside the established characters Mackenzie Hargreaves (Georgie Stone) and Byron Stone (Xavier Molyneux). When the show resumed broadcasting, the housemates are depicted as having been living together for only three months. Haz moved to Erinsborough from Geelong, Palekar told Sarah Ellis from Inside Soap that Haz arrived looking for a house share. He added that the cast were unsure how Haz, Mackenzie and Byron originally became friends. Molyneux added that the three characters lead "very different work lives" and Stone concluded that "they're all getting along really well."

Writers quickly positioned Haz as a potential love interest for Mackenzie. She is a widow, following the death of her husband, Hendrix Greyson (Ben Turland). This occurred two years prior to meeting Haz but writers portrayed her as willing to move on. Stone told Asyia Iftikhar from PinkNews that "the budding relationship between Mackenzie and Haz, that is gonna be really cool." She added that some of her "favourite moments" occurred whilst filming with Palekar.

In the backstage video series Ramsay Street Revelations, Stone revealed that it was an "incredibly big deal" for Mackenzie to be exploring romance again. She believed Mackenzie was reaching a point where she feels ready to move on. She described Haz and Mackenzie as "really good friends" and their early dynamic as a "will they? won't they?" style scenario. Stone stated that Mackenzie "loves" Haz's characteristics which are being "kind", "genuine", "funny", "playful" and "really down to earth". She added Mackenzie is a "really drawn to" Haz's "lightness" because of her past trauma. In the video, Palekar stated that Haz has "ultimate respect and admiration" for Mackenzie. He revealed that Haz values "honesty and justice and truth and just doing good in the world." He believed that Haz likes Mackenzie because upheld these morals. Palekar added that Haz "just admires the hell out of Mackenzie" and to Haz's "detriment" he "puts her on a pedestal." Writers created a series of relationship hurdles between Mackenzie and Haz. First she develops a connection with Eden Shaw (Costa D'Angelo). Billie Alessio (Georgia Walters), which is halted by Haz favouring his pet dog, Trevor over Billie.

== Trevor ==
Trevor
- Neighbours character
- Portrayed by: Bodhi
- Duration: 2023–2025
- First appearance: 20 September 2023
- Last appearance: 4 August 2025
- Introduced by: Jason Herbison
- Species: Dog
- Breed: Groodle
In-universe information
- Other names: Bodie
- Owners: Alyssa Gavalas; Haz Devkar

Trevor, played by Bodhi, made his first appearance on 20 September 2023. Trevor is introduced into the series as Haz Devkar's (Shiv Palekar) pet dog. The character was announced via the Neighbours official X account on 3 August 2023, prior to the series return. The dog appeared in promotional cast pictures prior to announcement. The inclusion of a dog in the show had long been a traditional aspect in the soap opera, which Trevor continues. Bodhi's breed is a Groodle, a cross breed between a Golden Retriever and a Poodle. Bodhi is supplied to Neighbours from the animal talent agency, "Paws on Film". Bodhi was trained by Luke Hura, who previously trained numerous other on-screen pets in Neighbours, including Bouncer. Hura described Bodhi as a "very intelligent dog" but sometimes becomes distracted during filming. Lauren Sellwood has also been credited as the animal wrangler during Trevor's episodes. Paleker revealed that Trevor would be a chaotic character. He told Sarah Ellis from Inside Soap that "Trevor's gorgeous, and is going to steal every scene. He's an agent of chaos - but beautiful chaos!"

In 2024, writers created a new storyline for Trevor in which his original owner, Alyssa Gavalas (Imogen Sage) is introduced. She recognises Trevor whilst he is being taken for a walk by Byron Stone (Xavier Molyneux). The scenes also reveal that Trevor's original name was Bodie. She wants to contact Haz and reconnect with her lost dog. Haz fears he will lose Trevor and seeks legal advice.

Trevor is a rescue dog owned by Haz. He brings Trevor into work at Harold's Café, despite health and safety regulations. Trevor chews on and destroys Mackenzie Hargreaves (Georgie Stone) pillows, which were bought for her by Sadie Rodwell (Emerald Chan). Trevor's presence at the café causes problems for Haz when dog hairs are found in food and drinks purchased onsite. Haz reveals that Trevor has anxiety and cannot stay at home. Mackenzie agrees to look after Trevor at home. He continues to struggle when left alone and chews up a jumper belonging to Haz's girlfriend, Billie Alessio (Georgia Walters). When Trevor annoys Billie, she locks him out of the house over night. Haz is shocked to find Trevor outside the following morning and breaks-up with Billie for her attitude towards Trevor. Haz's next girlfriend, Holly Hoyland (Lucinda Armstrong Hall) destroys a scarf gifted to him by Mackenzie because she is jealous. She lets Trevor take the blame for the damage but Haz soon discovers she has lied. Byron takes Trevor for a walk where he meets Trevor's original owner, Alyssa. She reveals that she had been looking for Trevor, originally named Bodie since he went missing. She requests that Byron give her Haz's details so she can reconnect with her former pet. Haz is reluctant to speak to her and forbids his housemates to let Trevor go outside. However, after Alyssa introduces her son to Haz, he agrees to give Trevor back. Haz and Mackenzie watch Trevor drive away in Alyssa's car. Trevor runs off from the Gavalas family home and returns to Haz, who returns him back to Alyssa. The Gavalases decide to return Trevor back to Haz after they realise he is homesick.

== Eden Shaw ==
Eden Shaw
- Neighbours character
- Portrayed by: Costa D'Angelo
- Duration: 2023–2024
- First appearance: 16 October 2023
- Last appearance: 12 February 2024
- Introduced by: Jason Herbison
In-universe information
- Occupation: Waiter
- Daughters: Hope Sinclair

Eden Shaw, played by Costa D'Angelo, made his first appearance on 16 October 2023. Eden is introduced into the series as a potential love interest of Mackenzie Hargreaves (Georgie Stone). He first appears in The Waterhole where he meets a drunken Mackenzie and introduces himself as Ed. They share romantic chemistry and get to know each other. Writers played his introduction as a surprise reveal after it becomes apparent that he is Eden, the ex-boyfriend of Holly Hoyland (Lucinda Armstrong Hall), who had discussed the character in various scenes detailing their difficult break-up. In a backstage video, D'Angelo revealed that "Eden is a bit of a troubled character" and confirmed there would be much drama between him and Holly. Armstrong Hall added that "Eden and Holly are exes and Eden treated her pretty badly and was quite nasty."

Peter Hart and Dan Laurie from OK! branded Eden a "bad boy" type character. They revealed that Eden would play "a key part" in the show's flashback week. The week consists of special flashback episodes which reveal what occurred during the show's absence from television. Armstrong Hall told Sarah Ellis from Inside Soap that Eden is Holly's first love. She revealed that they met in the UK then travelled to Australia together.`She added that Holly wanted Eden to meet her parents Karl Kennedy (Alan Fletcher) and Izzy Hoyland (Natalie Bassingthwaighte). Holly was upset to find Izzy and Shane Ramsay (Peter O'Brien) "being naughty" and decided to postpone the meeting. Instead, during the flashback scenes, they meet Krista Sinclair (Majella Davis) and go backpacking with her. Armstrong Hall added that the trio "just wanted to escape, go have fun and be young together." She added that over a year Eden, Holly and Krista become great friends but it ends in a "really heart-breaking" scenario of Holly discovering that Eden and Krista had sex.

Eden meets Mackenzie in The Waterhole and flirts with her. Eden then receives a job at Yorokobi Winery. Eden meets Mackenzie's friends, but when he sees Holly, he flees and runs back into the winery, where he steals Mackenzie's rings and her friends' bags. Holly and Haz Devkar (Shiv Palekar) go to an address they believe Eden is staying at and they find all the stolen belongings except the rings, before Eden locks Holly in the shed, punches Haz in the eye and escapes before the police arrive. Later, Eden is recognised by Sharon Davies (Jessica Muschamp), before running off. Eden knocks out Nell Rebecchi (Ayisha Salem-Towner) when she enters a house that she believes her stepmother Melanie Pearson (Lucinda Cowden) is staying at. Melanie arrives home and tends to Nell and takes her to a nearby pay-phone. Nell's father Toadie Rebecchi (Ryan Moloney) contacts the police when he realises she is missing. They track her down to Melanie's house and break the door down. Holly and Haz find Nell with Melanie, but Holly is shocked to learn that Eden is behind Nell's injury.

It is revealed that one year ago, Eden cheated on Holly with Krista. When Melanie pushed Krista in the pool and she hit her head, Eden blackmailed Paul Robinson (Stefan Dennis) into keeping her death a secret. However, Krista survives the incident and is left in a controlling relationship with Eden. Holly and her friends eventually track Eden to a deceased estate, where Krista is found. Eden is arrested by the police.

Upon his release from prison, Eden confronts Krista and her new boyfriend Leo Tanaka (Tim Kano) and reveals he knows about her pregnancy. Eden and Leo begin fighting, David Tanaka (Takaya Honda) lunges at Eden to defend his brother. Eden and David subsequently fall off a cliff. David insists that Eden is saved first and David dies. Eden has surgery and survives the ordeal. Eden refuses to reveal how he knew about Krista's whereabouts to police. Paul later visits Eden and threatens him and it is revealed Paul informed Eden about Krista's pregnancy and holiday plans, which inadvertently caused David's death. Eden escapes from hospital despite being weak from surgery. He visits Melanie and holds her hostage with a scalpel. The police surround Eden and a siege ensues but Toadie enters the house, attacks Eden and frees Melanie. Eden is then rearrested and taken away.

== Krista Sinclair ==
Krista Sinclair, played by Majella Davis, made her first appearance on 13 November 2023. Krista is the half-sister of Reece Sinclair (Mischa Barton). Krista was involved in a mystery storyline prior to her debut. Barton revealed on 2 October 2023, that the main reason for Reece being in Erinsborough was to track down her sister. After Krista was revealed to have survived her apparent death on-screen on 21 November, official Neighbours social media accounts confirmed that Davis was continuing in the role. Davis revealed on Instagram that she had been hired on a year-long contract. Davis was added to the show's opening titles from 27 November 2023. Davis had previously auditioned for the roles of Chloe Brennan and Nicolette Stone but was unsuccessful. For her role as Krista, Davis was longlisted for "Best Daytime Star" at the 2024 Inside Soap Awards.

It was later revealed that Krista is friends with the characters Holly Hoyland (Lucinda Armstrong Hall) and Eden Shaw (Costa D'Angelo). Their friendship is explored during a special week of episodes containing flashback scenes. These were designed to show viewers stories that had occurred whilst Neighbours had ceased broadcasting. Armstrong Hall told Sarah Ellis from Inside Soap that Krista meets Holly and Eden, who are in a relationship in Erinsborough. They become friends and go on a road trip together because they "just wanted to escape, go have fun and be young together." Krista and Holly develop a close friendship and spend a year together. Krista also becomes close to Eden and they have sex. Armstrong Hall revealed that their betrayal is "really heart-breaking". On 12 November 2023, Amazon Freevee released a trailer promoting Reece's search for Krista. In the video Reece discovers a photograph of Krista, Holly and Eden, confirming their friendship.

Davis explained in the online series Ramsay Street Revelations that Krista was her first "official big gig". Of describing Krista, Davis said that she is "a very outgoing person. She's very fun and eccentric and she loves life. She loves the party vibe." Davis also explained that she was unaware of the connection between her and Barton's characters until she noticed that Barton's character's surname was the same as Krista's. Krista has been told that she has to "take on the family business, go into the family line and she does not want to, so she has taken a little journey down to Ramsay Street to evade her family." Davis promised "lots of ups and downs for Krista, but there's great redemption".

== Others ==
Date(s)	Character	Actor	Circumstances
21 September	Mary Ryan	Carissa McPherson	A lady who is helped by Remi Varga-Murphy and Karl Kennedy when she begins to choke on her food whilst having dinner in The Waterhole.
2 October 2023–12 March 2024	Billie Alessio	Georgia Walters	A lady who Haz Devkar takes home after meeting her through an online dating app. They begin dating and go to the beach together. Billie's jumper is chewed by Haz's dog, Trevor, and when Billie asks Haz who he would save in the event of a fire, Haz reveals that he would rescue Trevor before Billie. After Billie locks Trevor out of the house, she breaks up with Haz. Months later, she participates in the Lassiters Lie-In competition and is disqualified for adding laxatives to Haz's food.
12 October 2023–3 January 2024	Noah Dawes	Zane Ciarma	A school boy who bullies Dex Varga-Murphy for having two mothers. He is later caught by principal Jane Harris and receives a three-day suspension. Noah attends the New Year's Eve party at The Waterhole with friends. Krista Sinclair notices they are drinking alcohol and orders them to leave.
12 October	Pete Dawes	Gabriel Egan	Noah Dawes' father, who apologises to school principal Jane Harris on his son's behalf. He explains that he thinks his punishment is too harsh and later sends an email threatening to reduce the school's attendance.
12 October	Monique Fallon	Lily Mooney	A woman who Reece Sinclair recognises from a distance.
18 October	Sandy Phillips	Juliana Begue	A Lassiters Hotel housekeeper, who sorts through the lost property with Katrina Marshall.
23 October	Garrett Wilkins	Scott Reid	A man who attends a tour of Erinsborough High School.
23 October	Antonia Hammond	Katie Weston	A woman who attends a tour of Erinsborough High School.
23 October	James Douglas	Andy Steuart	Terese Willis' architect, who tours Erinsborough High School, a proposed development location.
23 October 2023–12 December 2024	Tess Carmichael	Anica Calida	The manager of the Sinclair group, the main investors in Lassiters, who knocks on Reece Sinclair's hotel room. She tells Reece that she has been completing her task of finding her sister too slowly and that she will be keeping an eye on her. Tess later has dinner with the Lassiters owner, Paul Robinson, who tells Tess that Reece is remaining in Erinsborough because she is dating Byron Stone, who is an ex-escort. Tess then tells Reece that her father, Conrad, has ordered her to return home, however Reece convinces him to let her stay. Tess returns the following year to keep an eye on Lassiters and its management by Krista Sinclair. She meets with Krista and she sets her up in an office while she stays. Tess later introduces Heath Royce and her assistant. Tess plots with Heath to scam Krista and Lassiters for money and for them to flee the Sinclair group together as a couple. The two hire a mansion to stay in the area. Tess later goes to Mount Harper outback with Heath to check on another investment and get more money, and flees Erinsborough after Paul and the police discover what she is doing. After Heath goes rogue and fed up of Tess's orders, he traps her in the back of his car and runs around with a rifle. Tess is later rescued by Mackenzie Hargraeves, and later calls the police after Melanie Pearson discovers that Mackenzie had been shot be Heath. Tess is escorted back to Erinsborough by police and apologizes to Krista, and promises to take full responsibility for what she has done.
25 October	Tina Marin	Paris Valentino	A worker at the Lassiters Hotel Dayspa, who gives Reece Sinclair information about some guests who booked massages. Tina later tells Byron Stone that Reece visited her. Off-screen, Tina is fired for incompetence, but Paul rehires her in return for her father, Anthony, voting in favour for Paul's ex-wife's proposal at the council.
25 October 2023-27 March 2024	Penny Shrewster	Jessica Husband	A Lassiters Hotel worker, who gives Reece Sinclair information on some guests. Penny later works a shift at Lassiters during a promotional event. Krista Sinclair decides to fire Penny from her job after she causes various issues for the hotel, following which she attempts to steal a number of items from the hotel until she is intercepted by Chelsea Murphy. Following her departure, Chelsea suggests Penny may have trapped Krista in the hotel's sauna as revenge for her firing, leading to the death of her unborn baby.
1-15 November 2023, 21 November 2024-	Hudson Greene	Nikita Chronis	A mechanic at Fitzgerald Motors, who tells Reece Sinclair and Byron Stone that he sold a car to Theo Kaloudis. He later appears in a flashback giving a service to Krista Sinclair's car. Lucas Fitzgerald sells the business to Shane Ramsay on the condition Hudson is kept on as manager. Hudson meets Shane's son, Max Ramsay, who plans to finish his mechanics apprenticeship at the garage.
1 November	Theo Kaloudis	Lawrence Hawkins	An Erinsborough High School student, who sees Reece Sinclair and Byron Stone leaning against his car. Reece explains that her missing sister, Krista, used to own the car. She then buys it off him for $5000.
9 November	Ted Munce	David Simes	A backpackers' receptionist who tells Reece Sinclair and Byron Stone that he does not recognise a photo of Reece's sister, Krista.
16 November 2023, 30 September-4 December 2024	Senior Sergeant Tony Thompson	Damien Aylward	Tony is a police officer who interrogates Paul Robinson with Andrew Rodwell over the death of Krista Sinclair. He appears again when an armed siege occurs at The Waterhole. He later reprimands Andrew for shouting at a fellow colleague. He suspends Andrew after witnessing him becoming physical with a criminal. Krista later asks Tony for help located her friend Sebastian Metcalfe.
20 November	Gillian Byrne	Sally Cheng	An Erinsborough councillor who attends Terese Willis and Jane Harris' proposal of combining a school and aged care facility together.
20 November	Anthony Marin	Gregory Caine	A conservative Erinsborough councillor who attends Terese Willis and Jane Harris' proposal of combining a school and aged care facility together. It is later revealed that Paul Robinson bribed Anthony to swing the vote in the proposal's favour in return for giving his daughter, Tina, her job back.
4 December	Neil Martello	Steven Oktaras	A security guard paid by Terese Willis to patrol Erinsborough High School. When the school gets overrun by protesters, Neil assists in clearing the premises. While escorting out Marty Muggleton, Neil accidentally knocks Melanie Pearson down the stairs. Oktaras previously played Scott Triffett in 2021 and 2022.
20–21 December	Tamara Daine	Jodie Dry	An old client of Byron Stone who previously used his escorting services. Tamara attempts to rehire Byron and he agrees to go on holiday with her. Byron's sister, Nicolette Stone, encourages Tamara to drop Byron because he has just broken up with Reece Sinclair.
