= Naomi Rukavina =

Australian actress

- Born: Australia
- Occupation: Actress
- Years active: 2010–present

Naomi Rukavina is an Australian television and theatre actress. Her career began playing various stage roles whilst studying at the Victorian College of the Arts. She took roles in various short films and her film debut was in the 2012 comedy Save Your Legs!, playing Rafaela. Rukavina continued to work in the theatre industry for numerous years, playing roles in productions by Melbourne Theatre Company, Malthouse Theatre and The Hayloft Project. These appearances continued over a decade whilst Rukavina worked in guest roles in various Australian television series. From 2020 until 2023, Rukavina played various roles in the Australian stage production of Harry Potter and the Cursed Child. In 2023, Rukavina played Denise in the horror film, Run Rabbit Run. That year she joined regular cast of the soap opera Neighbours, playing Remi Varga-Murphy.

== Early life ==
Rukavina is biracial, her mother is Croatian and her father is Nigerian. Rukavina took her professional training at Victorian College of the Arts (VCA) and in 2010, she graduated with a Bachelor of Dramatic Art in acting. Rukavina resides in Melbourne.

== Career ==
Rukavina faced difficulties gaining television roles in her early career. In one of her first television auditions, a casting agent told Rukavina that she was not suitable to be cast in Australian familial roles. The comments had a lasting impact on the actress throughout her career. She then appeared in various short films. Rukavina gained her first film role as Rafaela in the Australian comedy Save Your Legs!.

Rukavina appeared in numerous VCA theatre productions and later transitioned into professional roles in larger theatre companies. From 2010 onwards, Rukavina gained work with Melbourne Theatre Company (MTC), playing Tituba in the 2013 production of The Crucible. Rukavina had previously portrayed the role in amateur production of The Crucible with the Mordialloc Theatre Company. In 2014, she played Leila in MTC's production of Yellow Moon Rukavina discovered her love for "non-naturalistic theatre" via the role. She revealed "I love working in this type of theatre. We have four prop/set items. The rest we create with our bodies, our words and the space."

Rukavina has also worked for the Malthouse Theatre on numerous occasions. In 2014, she played various roles in Normal.Suburban.Planetary.Meltdown She assumed the role of Tilda Gamble Going Down in 2014. Another role with Malthouse came in 2017, playing Meg/Leonie in Away, which was a co production with Sydney Theatre Company (STC). Her work for The Hayloft Project started in 2012, with the role Neoptolemus in The Seizure She returned the following year taking the roles as Reede and Gemma et al in Arden V Arden. In 2015, Rukavina played the titular role in the Complete Works Theatre Company production of Madea.

In the intervening time Rukavina gained guest roles in episodes of Offspring (2013), It's a Date (2014), Wentworth (2015), Newton's Law and Get Krack!n (both 2017). She also made a film appearance as Nurse Prudence in the 2016 comedy, Emo the Musical. From 2020 until 2023, Rukavina played various roles in the Australian production of Harry Potter and the Cursed Child. During different shows she played the characters Ginny Weasley, Hermione Granger, Minerva McGonagall, Dolores Umbridge and Rolanda Hooch. In 2023, Rukavina played the role of Denise in Daina Reid's horror film Run Rabbit Run, which premiered at the 2023 Sundance Film Festival.

On 22 June 2023, it was announced that Rukavina had joined the regular cast of the soap opera Neighbours, playing Remi Varga-Murphy. The character was part of a diverse family consisting of two females and their two children. Queer actress Sara West was cast as Remi's wife, Cara Varga-Murphy. Rukavina was "thrilled" to join Neighbours because they were leading in "showcasing diverse and real representations of Australian families, not in a tokenistic way." She believed "as an actor of colour, and as a queer actor for Sara, it's really important to have real-life humans represented" on an international show. She added that the "heartening" result was a "gorgeous little biracial, queer family". Rukavina viewed her casting in Neighbours as a victory, recalling the casting agent who told her she would never gain a familial television role. She told Sian Cain from The Guardian that her instant reaction was "Fuck yeah. Taste it." When Rukavina began playing with Remi, she continued to appear in Harry Potter shows for three months. Rukavina worked sixteen hour days, consisting of filming at Neighbours and performing eight stage shows a week. Her role as Remi gained her a "Rising Star" nomination at the 2023 Digital Spy Reader Awards.

== Filmography ==
=== Television ===
Year	Title	Role	Notes
2013	Offspring	Chelsea	Guest role
2014	Night Terrace	Sam / Storyteller	Radio series
2014	It's a Date	Physio	Guest role
2015	Wentworth	Christine Connors	Guest role
2017	Newton's Law	Avery Walipi	Guest role
2017	Get Krack!n	Boxing Instructor	Guest role
2023-2025	Neighbours	Remi Varga-Murphy	Regular role

=== Film ===
Year	Title	Role	Notes
2023	Run Rabbit Run	Denise	Film
2018	Intrusion	Laura	Short film
2018	An Act of Love	Shelley	Short film
2016	Emo the Musical	Nurse Prudence	Film
2014	Everybody Has a Story	Dana	Short film
2012	FH2: FagHag2000	Benny's FagHag2000	Short film
2012	Save Your Legs!	Rafaela	Film
2010	Goodbye Hello	Mia's friend	Short film
2010	Chasing Planes	Prostitute	Short film
