= Melanie Pearson =

Fictional character from the Australian soap opera Neighbours

- Neighbours character
- Portrayed by: Lucinda Cowden
- Duration: 1987–1991, 2005, 2021–2025
- First appearance: 30 July 1987
- Last appearance: 11 December 2025
- Introduced by: Reg Watson (1987); Don Battye (1988); Ric Pellizzeri (2005); Jason Herbison (2021)
In-universe information
- Other names: Melanie Mangel
- Occupation: Housekeeper; Secretary; Personal assistant; Drinks van owner
- Father: Bill Pearson
- Mother: Mrs Pearson
- Sisters: Justine Pearson
- Husband: Joe Mangel (1991–; divorced); Toadie Rebecchi (2022–2023)
- Stepsons: Toby Mangel; Callum Rebecchi; Hugo Rebecchi
- Stepdaughters: Sky Mangel; Nell Rebecchi

Melanie Pearson (also Mangel) is a fictional character from the Australian television soap opera Neighbours, played by Lucinda Cowden. She made her first appearance as Melanie during the episode broadcast on 30 July 1987. Cowden originally appeared in a guest role, with Melanie being introduced as a love interest of Henry Ramsay (Craig McLachlan). Cowden returned as a regular cast member and the character was made a secretary working for Paul Robinson (Stefan Dennis). Melanie is characterised as having a zany personality and wears wacky outfits. She also has a unique sounding laugh, which Cowden likened to sounds made by a seal or a donkey. Melanie's laugh became one of her defining features and television critics have discussed it in reviews.

In 1990, writers explored Melanie's romance with Kelvin Stubbs (Michael Fletcher). They later paired her in a relationship with Joe Mangel (Mark Little), which developed into a marriage. The character departed on 24 October 1991 and her exit story featured Melanie and Joe leaving Erinsborough. Producers asked Cowden to return soon after, but Cowden declined, citing numerous cast departures as damaging the show. In 2005, Cowden reprised her role for Neighbours' 20th anniversary episode. She reprised the role again on a recurring basis from 8 January 2021, then later as a regular from 22 September 2021. One of her main stories in this stint focused on her relationship with Toadie Rebecchi (Ryan Moloney). Neighbours was cancelled in 2022 and Melanie appeared until the series finale. Producers decided to center the episode around Melanie and Toadie's wedding. Cowden reprised her role in the Neighbours 2023 reboot during flashback week, which explains her and Toadie's marriage breakdown. Producers decided to write Melanie out of the series again and Cowden exited the series on 19 November 2024, though made a guest appearance in March 2025 as part of the Neighbours 40th Anniversary episodes, and returned again for the final episodes on 11 December 2025.

== Casting ==
Actress Lucinda Cowden joined the cast of Neighbours as Melanie for seven episodes in 1987. She returned for six episodes the following year. Cowden left to star in daytime soap opera The Power, The Passion, but when the show was cancelled Cowden decided to call the Neighbours producer about a return. Coincidentally, the actress called on the same day Annie Jones (who portrays Jane Harris) had decided not to renew her contract and Cowden was invited to re-join the cast as a regular cast member.

== Development ==
=== Characterisation ===
Melanie was introduced as the girlfriend of Henry Ramsay (Craig McLachlan). The following year, she returned as Paul Robinson's (Stefan Dennis) temporary secretary. Despite being "a nightmare to work with", Paul realised that she was good at her job and kept her on. Melanie moved in with widower Des Clarke (Paul Keane) and helped cheer him up, following the death of his wife. In her 1994 book, The Neighbours Programme Guide, Josephine Monroe stated that Melanie had a "zany personality, wacky outfits and outrageous laugh". Cowden thought that she did not have much in common with her character, except that they are both fun. That aspect of Melanie's personality initially attracted Cowden to the role.

One of Melanie's most noticeable characteristics is her loud laugh. Melanie's laugh was created for her first appearances in the show. Cowden revealed that it was supposed to sound similar to a noises made by a seal or a donkey. When Cowden re-joined the cast, she was required to resume Melanie's laugh which hurt her throat. Monroe described Melanie's distinctive laugh as sounding like "a seal having a hernia." Cowden has revealed that she did not laugh in the same way Melanie did. During a 1993 via the Thame Gazette, Cowden again recalled that voicing Melanie's laugh eventually "hurt" her whilst doing it and Melanie stopped laughing as frequently. She explained that originally, "I started off that the laugh was all the character was, but I wanted Melanie to be more than that funny laugh." When Cowden returned in 2021, she had to remember to perform Melanie's signature laugh. She revealed it took her some time to remember how to do it correctly. She likened it to starting a car engine that had not been used in a number of years.

=== Relationship with Kelvin Stubbs ===
Writers paired Melanie romantically with Kelvin Stubbs (Michael Fletcher). He is portrayed as a "bashful" character who eventually transforms his looks and romances Melanie. Fletcher told Stuart Gilles from Manchester Evening News that Kelvin "always fancied her" but believed Melanie would not want a relationship with a "bashful type". Melanie later pursues romance with Kelvin when he changes his appearance. Fletcher revealed that Kelvin becomes "less clumsy" and "transformed into someone "very different". He revealed that producers made him wear glasses to make him more attractive to Melanie. Writers opted for a passionate relationship for the duo, with more intimate scenes being written than were broadcast. Fletcher revealed that he and Cowden changed some intimate scenes they believed were "over the top" because they were always kissing. He described their relationship as problematic because "they keep falling in and out of love". Fletcher described the end of Melanie and Kelvin's relationship as "surprising" and recalled crying when he first read the scripts.

=== Marriage to Joe Mangel ===
In 1991, Melanie married Joe Mangel (Mark Little) and the two characters exited the serial soon after. Cowden told Chrissie Camp from TV Week about feeling "a chemistry" with Little when they began working together, which viewers and writers both picked up on. Little added his belief that viewers were "dying for" Melanie and Joe to get together and that "everyone" had been getting "a bit panicky" that they may not begin a relationship. Cowden believed the two "relate so well to each other because they are both a bit off-kilter and accept each other without question." She added that no other Neighbours characters interact in this way.

Initially Joe and Melanie seemed to have little in common and had not considered a romantic relationship with one another. However, Joe's feelings changed when Glen Donnelly (Richard Huggett) pointed out to Joe that he was wasting his time finding "a new love" when she, in the form of Melanie, was under his nose the whole time. Of Melanie's feelings towards Joe, Cowden told Mary Fletcher from Inside Soap, "Melanie took a long time to realise how she felt about Joe because she's such a dreamer. She has this fantasy about some prince in shining armour who'd come along on a white horse and sweep her off her feet. It didn't occur to her that the man who would make her happy was so close to home."

Melanie was set to marry her fiancé Simon Hunter (Frederick Whitlock) when she was cast in a television dating show along with Joe. Little explained that Joe realises he "really likes" Melanie but "resigned himself" to giving up on potential romance with her because of Simon. Cowden added that Melanie purposely gives "odd answers" on the dating show to avoid being paired with Joe. The audience vote for them to win and they are awarded a tickets to a holiday resort. At the weekend away, Joe declared his feelings for her and Little described Joe as "embarrassed" but Joe had "loved her all along". Melanie realised her true feelings for him. Melanie also realised why she was unable to fully commit herself to Simon. Cowden told Camp that Melanie's engagement to Simon made her realise she would miss living with Joe and his son, Toby (Ben Geurens). She added that upon hearing Joe's admission, Melanie realises that "Yeah, I could have it all with Joe." Cowden thought the storyline was wonderful and like the viewers, she got caught up in it. Knowing that his children got on well with Melanie was important to Joe and Toby, helped him deal with his "awkwardness" towards proposing to her. Melanie turned down the proposal as a joke, but quickly said yes. Cowden told Fletcher that in the end Melanie had fallen for Joe as he was "true, loyal and honest".

In Australia, there was much anticipation from viewers about the wedding and whether they would actually go through with it. Cowden recalled being heckled in shops by fans who demanded to know the story's outcome. Well known for a dress sense that is out of the ordinary, Joe begins to worry about what Melanie will wear to their wedding. Cowden told Richard Shears from TV Quick that "you can understand poor Joe's concern, dippy Melanie is the sort of character who could turn up in a tutu and tap dance down the aisle." Little added that Joe is worried but "he loves her and he figures he's going to marry her, no matter what." When Melanie arrives at the church, she is wearing a traditional dress. Cowden was happy that Melanie had chosen tradition over kookiness because she had taken the wedding so seriously in the story. Both Cowden and Little were proud of the romance story they had helped to create. She added "we both love our characters, we've worked very hard to make the romance special."

=== Departure and brief return ===
Joe and Melanie were married in front of their friends and they headed off to Europe for their honeymoon, which also marked their exit from the show. When Little decided that it was time for him to move on from Neighbours, his decision coincided with Cowden's feelings of restlessness. The actress explained "I'd been in the series for two and half years and it felt to me as if I'd got the best out of Melanie." Cowden continued saying that she did not want to return without Little and have to work on a storyline that would see Melanie falling in love with a new character. It did not feel right to her and she and Little thought Joe and Melanie's honeymoon would be the perfect exit for them. Their departure also coincided with plans to rejuvenate the show after the show's ratings declined. Network Ten's executive John Holmes oversaw multiple departures in 1991, which made way for new "young and spunky" characters. She described playing Melanie as a "good experience" and added "I learned an enormous amount about television." By 1993, producers had asked Cowden to return but she declined. She told Val Watts from Halifax's Evening Courier that the decision to write out multiple characters upset her. She claimed they failed to "realise the impact it would have on the show" and "they only see things in the short term."

Cowden reprised the role in 2005 and joined several returning cast members for the show's 20th anniversary episode, which was broadcast in July. It emerges that Melanie and Joe's marriage has ended. Cowden admitted that she was sad upon hearing the development, saying "I think Joe and Mel would have stayed together forever but as we aren't going to go back, I suppose the producers had the right to do it."

=== Reintroduction ===
On 9 December 2020, the serial's social media team confirmed that Cowden had reprised the role, after she was briefly seen in a promotional trailer for the show. Cowden's return scenes began airing from 8 January 2021. Cowden told Sarah Ellis of Inside Soap that her return came as a surprise, but it was a welcome one, as her other work had shut down due to the COVID-19 pandemic. She continued, "It was just brilliant to be working, but also so much fun to be here again. It was so nice to work with old mates, some of the crew from years are still here. It was just really joyous, and I was so delightfully welcomed by the new and the old cast." Of how Melanie had changed over the years, Cowden said she was "worse than she used to be!" She is more free-spirited than before and continues to not worry about what other people think of her. Cowden confirmed that Melanie's signature laugh would also be back.

Cowden explained that Melanie is now living in the suburb of Ansons Corner, having made a permanent return to Australia. She comes back to Erinsborough after Des Clarke contacts her on social media and invites her to lunch with him and Jane Harris. Cowden enjoyed her first scenes with Keane and Jones, as she had maintained a friendship with both of them since her time in Neighbours. Melanie voices disapproval about Jane's new relationship with Clive Gibbons (Geoff Paine) and Cowden said Melanie thinks it is "an absolute disaster!" She worries for Jane when she learns Clive is spending time with his former partner, and Cowden reckoned that Melanie might have been in a similar situation where someone she was dating was still seeing their ex. Melanie talks non-stop and appears to have worn Des and Jane down by the end of their lunch. Cowden also said Melanie would eventually would meet with Paul Robinson, but in her initial episodes, Paul hides from her when he hears her laugh.

When asked what storylines were coming up for Melanie, Cowden said that she would start working for Toadfish Rebecchi (Ryan Moloney) as his personal assistant. She thought Melanie and Toadie had a nice relationship and their story involves various misunderstandings, which provides good comedy. She added: "Melanie gets her nose into places in the legal office that she probably shouldn't. She's very professional, but she likes to help people, she sometimes goes a bit above and beyond." In May 2021, Cowden confirmed that she would continue "popping in and out of the show", but hoped for a more permanent role. On 22 September 2021, Cowden was added to the opening titles as a semi-regular character.

=== Feud with Anna Buke ===
In August 2021, writers explored Melanie's history during her absence from the serial. Susannah Alexander reported that a "shocking secret from Melanie's past" would be revealed on screen. Mackenzie helps Melanie find a new job after she and Toadie decide it would be best if they stop working with one another in order to secure their relationship. Mackenzie helps Melanie with her CV and phones one of her references, a law firm, where Melanie was romantically involved with the firm owner, Justin Buke (Mick O'Malley), who was married to Anna Buke (Fiona Macleod) at the time. Cowden explained in an interview, "Justin Buke is a big time lawyer who used to be Mel's boss. They had an affair and Justin's wife Anna found out, causing Mel to lose her job, some friends and pride. Mel decided to get back at them when they refused to pay her severance and it didn't go well." Simon Timblick of whattowatch.com called it an "ill-fated affair." When the news that Melanie wants to use the Bukes' law firm as a reference reaches Anna, she is described as "furious" and goes to Rebecchi Law to "give Melanie a piece of her mind." Toadie soon discovers that the Bukes have a restraining order in place against Melanie after she "bitterly" placed a sack of prawns in Anna's car. The "scandal" is a hiccup for Melanie and Toadie's relationship, with actor Ryan Moloney explaining, "He thought he and Mel had an honest, open relationship. Now, this brings up a lot of questions about Melanie's past that he was completely unaware of. He starts to question the sincerity of their relationship. He thought they were building something special together, but now wonders if this is just what Melanie does with all her bosses." Katie Baillie of Metro questioned, "Has her sexy past ruined their loved-up future?"

=== Relationship with Toadie Rebecchi ===
Writers soon established a romantic relationship between Melanie and Toadie. The storyline was written in such a way that viewers were unaware that the characters were dating. Moloney thought it was a good way to start the plot, telling Ellis: "The writers have been very clever in the way the romance is divulged to viewers. Mackenzie Hargreaves (Georgie Stone) sets it up that Toadie is unfairly treating Melanie at work – only for it to be revealed, with no real clues, that they are in fact having a fling!" The couple previously went on a disastrous date after meeting through a dating app, and they eventually agreed to be friends. Ellis noted that something obviously must have happened between them to make them change their minds, but questioned why they kept the relationship a secret. Moloney explained that they both thought they would be judged because the romance formed in the office. He liked that the age gap between them is not raised until later. He also said that they are two consenting adults who are having fun and not hurting anyone. Moloney called Melanie "fun and spontaneous" and continued "She has no hang-ups, and she likes Toadie just for being him. They're both at a stage in their lives where they want to seize the moment and enjoy themselves. Toadie enjoys just being silly again." Toadie and Melanie are almost caught when Terese Willis (Rebekah Elmaloglou) unexpectedly enters the law office, while Melanie is on her knees, forcing her to hide under Toadie's desk. They later decide to use Mackenzie's accusations as a way to cover up their romance. Moloney told Ellis that he and Cowden were enjoying the storyline while they could, knowing that there would be "roadblocks" for their characters in the future, including commitment issues and Toadie's children.

Writers later established a love triangle storyline between Melanie, Toadie and his former love interest Rose Walker (Lucy Durack). After Rose's marriage breaks down, she returns to Erinsborough, but is "disappointed" to learn that Toadie is now in a relationship with Melanie. When asked about Melanie, Durack told a writer for TV Week "In any other circumstance, I think Rose would like Melanie. But in this instance, she sees her as a roadblock in the way of her romantic future with Toadie." Melanie becomes overprotective when she sees Rose "constantly having cosy chats with her fella." When Melanie confronts Rose, she throws Anna Buke's restraining order back in Melanie's face. Following Anna and Rose's arrivals, Melanie is left "trying hard to hold onto her man." At the Erinsborough Shorts and Brief's film festival, Toadie and Rose play a series of pranks on one another, including Toadie spiking Rose's drink with chili, which causes Rose to spit it on Melanie's face, leaving Melanie to fall backwards on to a buffet table. Melanie is taken to hospital afterwards and Moloney said "Toadie understands how Melanie is feeling, so he tries to give her as much attention as she needs to be secure and hopefully keep the peace between the two women. He's aware Rose may have some feelings for him, but he's in a good place with Mel after a rocky patch. He really is trying his best to be a better partner."

Rose uses the situation to get closer to Toadie by asking him to represent her in the event of a lawsuit from Melanie. In an attempt to thank him, Rose kisses Toadie, who immediately "pulls away and tells a hurt Melanie." Cowden explained, "Mel has been made out to look a bit crazier than she is, and Rose has taken advantage of that. Rose has added to the idea that Mel is too 'out there' and not good enough for Toadie. Soon, Mel starts to feel that that's what everyone thinks – including Toadie." Toadie feels "conflicted", while Moloney said in an interview, "When things go well with Mel, they're awesome. But when they're bad, they're really bad. Things just seem so light-hearted and fun with Rose. He's confused." At the film festival premiere, Lucy tries to "woo" Toadie, with Durack explaining, "Everyone is dressed in costume and Rose hears that Melanie is going to go as Elle Woods, because Legally Blonde is Toadie's favourite movie. Rose goes and buys the best Elle Woods costume, so there's nothing left for Melanie. So she does mean things like that." Simultaneously, Melanie teams up with Mackenzie and Susan Kennedy (Jackie Woodburne), and records a short film titled Ode to Toad, in which she confesses her love for Toadie at the premiere. The night ends with Toadie picking Melanie over Rose. The storyline also sparked Neighbours fans to choose their side by posting #TeamMelanie or #TeamRose on social media. At the end of her stint, Durack apologised for her character's plotting and said that she was "#TeamMelanie all the way."

=== Wedding and Neighbours' cancellation ===
The cancellation of Neighbours was announced in 2022 . Cowden was happy to be included in the show's then, final cast line up. Cowden was grateful to have had a second stint in Neighbours and revealed she would have stayed in the role permanently. She explained that Melanie "would have definitely" had more storylines if the show continued and that Melanie had constant stories until the show finished. She reflected that returning had been "totally joyous" and she experienced it "wholeheartedly and completely". She also praised her decision to retain Melanie's authenticity to her original characterisation. She concluded "I've committed to Mel and making her what she was before, not trying to turn her into somebody else."

Melanie and Toadie marry in the finale episode. Cowden told Alice Penwill from Inside Soap that it was a "really cute idea" to end the show with a wedding. She explained that the characters split the day into two with Toadie planning the ceremony and Melanie organising the after-party. The wedding takes place at the lake and this location was used to honour the deceased characters Sonya Rebecchi and Hendrix Greyson. In 2021, Cowden was only supposed to briefly return but Melanie ended up staying and creating a life with Toadie. She concluded that "I can't believe the show is ending with my wedding – I'm incredibly grateful. And I got to bag the Toad!" Herbison told Daniel Kilkelly from Digital Spy that "I wanted the stories to provide natural opportunities for other characters to appear, which of course the wedding did." Cowden revealed that she liked Melanie and Toadie's relationship, adding "I wouldn't have ever put Mel and Toadie together on paper and I was surprised when their relationship started. I was especially surprised when it continued rather than just being an affair. But I think they wholeheartedly enjoy each other's company."

=== Revival and flashback week ===
Neighbours was renewed by Amazon and confirmed to return in 2023. At the final date of the Neighbours - The Celebration Tour hosted on 16 April 2023, it was announced that Cowden had reprised the role again. It was revealed that Melanie would also return as a regular character. A publicist confirmed the news via the show's social media accounts. They stated that the production were "so excited" about Melanie's return, adding "We can't wait to welcome her back (and maybe her pig collection too)."

Although not initially being featured after the revival, Melanie returns to Erinsborough as part of the flashback week, which explains why she left her marriage. Spoiler pictures show Melanie having a "tense conversation" at Toadie and his new wife Terese's house. Writers developed a storyline where Melanie begins to be blackmailed for money by her former family friend Krista Sinclair (Majella Davis), and her boyfriend Eden Shaw (Costa D'Angelo). Advance spoilers written by Digital Spy reveal that she was "a housekeeper for Krista's family". It goes on to read that Melanie was caught on CCTV "holding Krista's drugs", so she "fled from the UK to avoid the consequences". The storyline hits a climax as Melanie pushes Krista into a spa, and presumes she is dead. She runs and reveals all to Paul, who convinces her and pays Eden to cover up the death, much to the "dismay" of his son David Tanaka (Takaya Honda). Cowden later told Metro UK that Melanie leaves her marriage to Toadie to be "selfless", adding that she will do "anything to protect the ones she loves, even if it means ruining her own life". Melanie has a short stint in prison before Krista is found alive in an abandoned house with Eden.

=== Death in the Outback ===
In July 2024, the character was announced as being involved in the forthcoming "Death in the Outback" storyline, during which promotional material stated that one character would depart the series. Cowden also confirmed that Melanie would be in serious danger, with her life on the line, saying "She does end up in an incredible amount of danger, absolutely. There's some pretty scary people out there, and she hurts herself quite early on, so it becomes quite difficult for her to be able to escape from said bad people. The storyline saw Melanie and Toadie taken hostage by Justin Ashton (Richard Sutherland) and Heath Royce (Ethan Panizza). They are taken to a remote location, where Heath was manipulating Holly Hoyland (Lucinda Armstrong Hall), and tied up in a cabin. While Heath was killed during the episode first shown on 22 August, Mackenzie and Toadie were both also left in potentially fatal circumstances. After Heath fired a number of gunshots into the bush, Melanie found Mackenzie seriously injured.

=== Second departure ===
On 29 October 2024, Cowden announced her departure from Neighbours via the NeighBens podcast, describing the decision to write out the character as "a bitter old pill to swallow". Producers informed Cowden that her contract would not be renewed in December 2023, and her departure occurred during a time four other characters were written out. Cowden explained that "all the contracts come up at the same time because we were all employed at the same time", however, she got to stay on "a little bit later to soften the blow" of the multiple departures. Cowden recalled that fellow cast members were "shocked to their socks" that she had been written out. She soon discovered Moloney was also leaving his role, which helped her make sense of the producer's decision to write Melanie out of the show. She believed that without Toadie and his family, writers were not sure what they could do with Melanie. Melanie's exit involves a leaving party, before she departs in her truck. Cowden revealed that she fell down a step and broke her nose whilst filming Melanie's exit scenes, which necessitated scenes to be remounted with the Neighbours location manager standing in for Cowden and, when Cowden was available, doubles for other unavailable cast members. Cowden subsequently filmed a short guest appearance, and expressed willingness to reprise the role again. Following the broadcast of her departure scenes on 19 November 2024, Cowden confirmed that her forthcoming guest appearance would be part of the series' fortieth anniversary episodes in 2025. Spoilers for the fortieth anniversary week reveal that Melanie returns to attend the wedding of Krista and Leo Tanaka (Tim Kano). In November 2025, it was confirmed that Cowden had reprised the role as Melanie for the show's final episodes.

== Storylines ==
=== 1987–2005 ===
Henry Ramsay brings Melanie home to meet his mother Madge (Anne Charleston), his sister Charlene (Kylie Minogue) and her husband Scott (Jason Donovan). Melanie's hiccupping animalistic laugh makes Henry's family feel uneasy and Madge and Charlene conspire to set her up with Mike Young (Guy Pearce) and Gino Rossini (Joey Perrone). Henry sees Gino handing Melanie his number and the relationship fizzles out but Melanie and Henry remain friends. Melanie is next seen working as a temporary secretary at The Daniels Corporation for Paul Robinson.

When Henry has relationship difficulties with Bronwyn Davies (Rachel Friend), Melanie is on hand to lend a sympathetic ear during a party. Bronwyn mistakes this for something more and is annoyed. Henry tries to resume dating Melanie after seeing that he is getting nowhere with Bronwyn but Melanie turns him down. The following year Melanie reappears and moves in with Mike, Des Clarke and his son Jamie at Number 28. Melanie's chirpy nature immediately wins Des over but when she interferes in his relationship with Jane Harris by taking a call and blasting Jane for her decision to end things with Des, he is angered but comes to realise a long-distance relationship with Jane would not be feasible and forgives Melanie.

After a one-night stand with Paul, who rejects and hurts her, Melanie finds happiness with nerdy waiter Kelvin. When Kelvin makes a pass at Melanie's friend Christina Alessi (Gayle Blakeney), Melanie refuses to believe her until she uncovers evidence of Kelvin being a love cheat and promptly dumps him. Melanie later becomes involved with much older businessman, Roger Walsh (Gregory Ross) and becomes engaged to him but the romance ends when Roger's daughter Tania (Angela Nicholls) opposes the relationship.

When her friend Kerry Bishop (Linda Hartley) is killed during a protest against duck hunting, Melanie moves in with Kerry's widower Joe Mangel and helps with the children Toby and Sky (Miranda Fryer). When Sky's biological father Eric Jensen (John Ley) comes to claim custody, Melanie offers to marry Joe to help him secure custody of Sky, but he politely declines. Melanie begins dating Simon Hunter and becomes engaged to him. Joe is devastated as he has developed feelings for her. When Melanie fills in for a contestant on a dating show, she is shocked to find Joe is her "dream date" and the pair win a romantic weekend together. Joe confesses his feelings, as does Melanie. When they return Melanie ends her engagement with Simon.

Joe and Melanie become engaged and marry in front of their friends, family and neighbours. Within weeks of their wedding, Joe receives a call from England that his mother Nell Mangel (Vivean Gray) has suffered a heart attack and to fund the medical expenses they will need to sell Number 32. Melanie and Joe decide to leave, taking Sky with them and leaving Toby in the care of school principal Dorothy Burke (Maggie Dence), in order for him to continue with his schooling. After several months touring Europe, they return and set up home in the country. Toby visits them at Christmas. The following year the family is reunited when Toby re-joins them after a new school is opened in the district. When Sky returns to Erinsborough, she tells her grandfather Harold Bishop (Ian Smith) that Joe and Melanie divorced a decade earlier. Two years later, Melanie appears in Annalise Hartman's (Kimberly Davies) documentary about Ramsay Street, where she is seen living in London and talking about past mistakes including working for Paul and marrying Joe.

=== 2021–2025 ===
Melanie later returns to Australia and moves to Ansons Corner. She returns to Erinsborough after being contacted by Des, and meets up with him and Jane for coffee. They explain that they are not together, and that Jane is now in a relationship with Clive Gibbons. Melanie does not think they are well suited, especially as Clive is busy supporting his former partner, Sheila Canning (Colette Mann). Melanie goes on a date with Toadfish Rebecchi, after they match on Tinder. Toadie does not recognise Melanie at first, but she admits to using an old photo and lying about her age. Toadie finds it difficult to get a word in due to Melanie's overly talkative personality. Toadie later hires Melanie as his personal assistant, and a Valentine's Day misunderstanding leads the pair to fear that each other want to be more than friends. After several months working together, Toadie and Melanie begin a casual relationship, but hide it from their friends and family. The truth comes out when Toadie's assistant Mackenzie Hargreaves mistakenly believes Toadie is dating Susan Kennedy's arch-nemesis Angela Lane (Amanda Harrison). Melanie believes that Angela has purposefully sabotaged one of Toadie's client cases so takes revenge by dumping manure outside her house. In the resulting clash with Melanie, Angela nearly strikes Toadie's infant son Hugo Somers (John Turner) with her car. Melanie blames herself and tells Toadie they cannot be together as she is too immature. Toadie helps Melanie see that she is good with Hugo and his daughter Nell Rebecchi (Scarlett Anderson), but he is annoyed when Melanie reveals to his children that they are dating before he is ready to tell them. They overcome their problems to become a real couple, but Toadie later begins avoiding Melanie. She forces him to admit that their increasingly serious relationship has brought up his grief for his dead wife Sonya Rebecchi (Eve Morey), but Melanie helps Toadie see that she is not replacing Sonya and that together they can honour her memory. They later get engaged and decide to move away from Ramsay. They are married at Lassiters Lake and receive messages from their family and friends, but eventually decide to keep living in Erinsborough. Their wedding reception is held on Ramsay Street.

Melanie leaves Toadie and their home in Erinsborough one year into their marriage, blaming the strain of being stepmother to Nell and Hugo. They divorce and Toadie later marries his neighbour Terese, just two years on from his wedding to Melanie. Nell struggles with her new stepmother and goes to Mel's new address, where she is knocked out by Eden Shaw (Costa D'Angelo). Mel finds Nell and brings her back to Ramsay Street, where she is reunited with Toadie. She reveals that Eden and his girlfriend Krista Sinclair (Majella Davis) have been blackmailing her for the past two years. Melanie was once Krista's housekeeper in the UK and took the wrap for her drug smuggling; she remains a fugitive after fleeing to Australia in the aftermath. Melanie knocks out Krista on the Lassiters rooftop and she is presumed dead. Eden blackmails Melanie's friend Paul to keep her death a secret. As a result, Melanie is convicted of manslaughter and goes to prison. When Krista is discovered alive, Melanie is released.

Melanie suffers a head injury and a broken shoulder at the Erinsborough High School closure protest. She moves in with Susan and Karl Kennedy (Alan Fletcher) on Ramsay street while she recovers. Melanie fires her lawyer after Toadie provides negative character reference. Toadie helps her and provides a positive reference. Krista buys and gifts the Drinks Divas Van to Melanie and she resumes business. She also supports Nell through her counselling sessions. Melanie joins a dating app and she is tricked into a date by Slade Westall (Charli De Stefano). They humiliate Mel and throw gunge over her, but are scared away by Haz Devkar (Shiv Palekar) and Mackenzie (Georgie Stone). She briefly dates her fruit supplier, Santo Oliviera (David Serafin).

Eden escapes from jail and holds Melanie hostage, demanding money. The police arrive and Toadie sneaks into the house and saves Melanie. Toadie stays with Melanie during the night to support her, which annoys Terese. She then tells Toadie she wants him back and makes plans to snare him from Terese. Toadie begins spending more time with Melanie when Terese supports Paul over David Tanaka's (Takaya Honda) death. Toadie becomes confused about his feelings and he and Melanie have sex. Melanie participates in the Lassiters Longest Lie-In event, in a bed next to Terese and Toadie. Melanie struggles and she tells Holly that she had sex with Toadie, unaware Terese is listening via a walkie-talkie. Melanie slaps Toadie across the face when he tells her their affair is a mistake. Melanie becomes paranoid the Kennedy's want her to move out but Karl reassures her she is still welcome. She takes the drinks van to the musical festival circuit for five weeks, hoping to earn enough money to move out of the Kennedy's house. She employs Logan Shembri (Matthew Backer) and brings him back to Erinsborough, introducing him to her friends. After he begins acting suspicious, Melanie steal's his caravan keys and discovers he purchased all of David's old clothes and he was stalking him. Logan quits his job and Melanie warns Aaron Brennan (Matt Wilson) about Logan's behaviour.

Melanie later tells Toadie that she has moved on and accepted their relationship would never work. This makes Toadie's mental health decline and she tries to support him. Toadie becomes concerned about Holly's involvement with Heath. Melanie and Toadie investigate a house Heath was renting and are kidnapped by Justin Ashton (Richard Sutherland). He puts them on a train to the outback where Heath and Holly are staying and locks them in an abandoned house. The police are informed that they have gone missing. They eventually escape after being kept tied up for days. Melanie rescues Holly from a sufficating in a corn silo and Heath chases them with a gun. Heath begins firing erratically and Melanie finds shelter. Holly pushes him into the river and he is eaten by a crocodile. Melanie finds Mackenzie with a gunshot wound in her shoulder. The police arrive and fly them back to Erinsborough. She comforts Toadie through his separation from Terese and moves into an apartment at Lassiters. She then invites Krista to move in and decides to re-join dating apps. Melanie meets Victor Stone (Craig Hall) and goes on a date with him, unaware he is Jane's ex-husband. She agrees to remain friends when she discovers the truth, not wanting to ruin her friendship with Jane. Melanie begins to develop feelings for Victor and they arrange a date, but he stands her up after Jane kisses him. Victor's daughter Nicolette Stone (Hannah Monson) gets in Melanie's ear to bring him and Jane back together. She decides to leave Erinsborough after Jane and Victor agree to give things another go. However, after they break up, Jane tells Melanie that she would be ok with her dating Victor. She has a farewell party on Power road, before leaving for Gippsland where she and Victor kiss. She later returns to Erinsborough briefly for the wedding of Krista and Leo, and tells Aaron that her and Victor are still going strong.

Melanie returned for the final episode when she toured Ramsey Hills and Robinson Towers with former and current residents due to Ramsey Street being demolished for a new highway. The show ended with it unknown what will happen to Ramsey Street.

== Reception ==
Ian Morrison, author of Neighbours: The Official Annual 1992, stated "If Melanie offers to lend a hand beware...her efforts don't always turn out as she would like!" A Coventry Telegraph reporter observed that Melanie became "a soap favourite" and branded her a "girl next door with a foghorn laugh, the dizzy secretary with a heart of gold who had thousands of viewers tuning in to watch her antics." Catherine Stott and Mike Austen from Thame Gazette described her a "the blonde bimbette with the laugh like a drain and the silly voice." The Herald's Neil Cooper was a fan of both the actress and the character, quipping "Cowden was the only real point to Neighbours for three years in the late eighties, the only real spark of ironic life beyond the ready-made airbrushed froth. Or rather Melanie, the character Cowden didn't so much play as wore like a Day-Glo romper suit crash coursing her way through the 'hood, was. Melanie was a hilarious cartoon creation, a ditzy, daffy, polka-dotted, colour-clashing surrealist heart-throb who occupied a planet made in her own garish image, before hitching up with boy-next-door Joe Mangle [sic] and leaving the street an all together greyer place." A critic from Derry Journal wrote that Melanie has a laugh like a donkey and quipped she would need to be a donkey to work for Paul. Evening Courier's Watts described Melanie as "zany and scatter-brained" and her laugh became the character's trademark. In another review, Watts could not blame Toby for not wanting to hear her laugh, likening it to "someone cranking up an engine". A Liverpool Echo reporter stated Melanie has a "hyena-like laugh" and is a "dizzy blonde" with a "wacky dress sense". A writer from Uxbridge & W. Drayton Gazette stated that Melanie is "famous for her funny laugh and squeaky voice."

A writer for the BBC's Neighbours website said Melanie's most notable moment was "Asking Joe to marry her". Katy Moon from Inside Soap praised Joe and Melanie's wedding, saying "No one can get hitched in soap these days without some kind of ruckus. But Joe Mangel [sic] and Melanie Pearson's wedding was a breeze and harks back to a time of innocence in soapland." Moon commented that Joe had found his match "in bubbly Mel". TV Week's Camp branded Melanie and Joe the "Ramsay Street oddballs" and predicted that viewers would be "trilled" with writers matching them up. Of Mel's style choices at the wedding, TV Quick's Richard Shears stated "she is renowned for her weird clothes and viewers were eager to know what she'd come up with for the big day."

Peter Holmes of The Sydney Morning Herald disliked the character, calling her a "brain-dead freak". Writing for BBC News, Genevieve Hassan included Melanie's laugh in her feature on the show's memorable moments. Hassan quipped, "Madcap Melanie (played by Lucinda Cowden) was best known on the soap for her foghorn, seal-like laugh and her frequent trips to the local Erinsborough astrologer, Madame Zolga." Sarah Ellis of Inside Soap was a fan of Toadie and Melanie's romance, writing "It may be an unconventional pairing, although we think Toadie and Melanie could work – after all, they both like to embrace the quirky side of life." Amy West described Melanie as "lovesick." Adam Beresford from HuffPost stated that Melanie's "seal-like laugh still haunts us".
