= Lucinda Cowden =

Australian actress (born 1965)

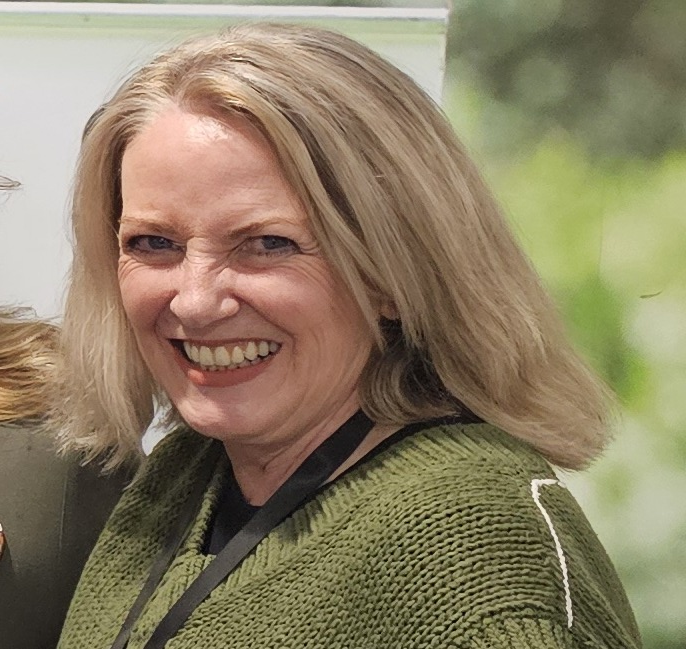
- Born: 24 April 1965 (age 61); Ballarat, Victoria, Australia
- Occupation: Actor
- Years active: 1985–present
- Notable work: Neighbours

Lucinda Cowden (born 24 April 1965) is an Australian actress, known for her role as Melanie Pearson in the soap opera Neighbours from 1987 until 1991. She also appeared in The Power, The Passion, presented children's television series Parallel 9 and was a voice actress on The Koala Brothers. She reprised her role as Melanie in Neighbours in 2021 and remained until 2024.

== Early life ==
Cowden was born on 24 April 1965 in Ballarat, Victoria. She has a sister. Cowden knew she wanted to be an actor from a young age and appeared on stage when she was five years old.

== Career ==
Cowden had a small guest role as Melanie Pearson in the soap opera Neighbours in 1987. She went on to play Danielle Edmonds in the short-lived 1989 soap The Power, The Passion. Two years after her guest appearance, Cowden was asked to return to Neighbours and was signed up for an initial six-month stint. She remained with Neighbours until 1991, with a cameo appearance in the 20th anniversary episode in 2005. Cowden left Neighbours in 1991, and later admitted that she did not want to be typecast.

After leaving Neighbours, Cowden went to the United Kingdom in 1993, where she did various acting jobs, presenting and stand-up comedy. She appeared as Aladdin at the Marlowe Theatre in Canterbury. She also embarked on a 12-week tour of the UK as Peter Pan. Cowden presented the second and third seasons of the BBC children's television series, Parallel 9. In 1996, she presented comic sketch show Highly Sprung! with Rick Adams. This was followed by a presenting role on the soap opera themed television show Soap Fever in 2000. In April 2000, Cowden starred in a production of Tony McNamara's black comedy play The John Wayne Principle at the Pleasance Theatre. She was a voice actress on the children's show The Koala Brothers.

Cowden returned to Neighbours in 2020. Cowden also reprised the role again in 2023 after the series was picked up by Amazon Freevee. On 29 October 2024, Cowden confirmed her exit from the show, Cowden said that she knew of her character's departure in December just days after co-star Ryan Moloney found out about his contract ending, Moloney had announced his exit from the show in June 2024. Cowden also confirmed the decision to leave the show was not hers as the contracts for cast came up all at once. Cowden revealed that when she was filming her final scene she had broken her nose after falling on set.

== Personal life ==
Cowden was married to comedian David Cotter. They married in Sydney in April 1990. Cotter appeared in a 1990 episode of Neighbours as Dr Barclay, but his and Cowden's characters did not interact.

== Filmography ==
=== Film ===
Year	Title	Role	Type
1993	Body Melt	Andrea	Feature film
2008	Lover's Walk	Young Audrey	Short film
2014	Chocolate Strawberry Vanilla	Amanda	Feature film
2016	ABCs of Death 2.5	Segment "M" for Mutant"	Feature film
2016	Lost Soul	Mother	Short film
2018	Just Between Us	Mum	Feature film

=== Television ===
Year	Title	Role	Notes
1985	Winners	Jenny Foster	Episode: "Just Friends"
1985	Handle with Care	Sarah	TV film
1985	Prisoner	Receptionist	Guest role
1986	Prisoner	Mandy	Guest role
1987–1991, 2005, 2021–2024	Neighbours	Melanie Pearson	Regular role
1989	The Power, The Passion	Danni Edmonds	Regular role
1992	The Late Show	Constantly upstaged actress	Guest role
1993–1994	Parallel 9	Herself – Presenter	TV series UK, 44 episodes
1996	Highly Sprung!	Herself – Presenter	
2003–2007	The Koala Brothers	Mitzi, Alice and Lolly (Voice)	Regular role
2004	The Basil Brush Show	Marion	Guest role
2006	Making Children Smile	Herself (Voice)	Video UK
2007	Doctors	Clare O'Grady	Guest role
2015	Neighbours 30th: The Stars Reunite	Herself	TV Special Documentary
2017	Gocsy's Classics	Guest role: Gloria	TV series, 1 episode
