= Neighbours 40th Anniversary =

- Neighbours episodes
- The "Story of Erinsborough" art exhibition is used in the anniversary episodes to link present storylines to the past of Neighbours.
- Episode nos.: Episodes 9208–9211
- Directed by: Harry Lloyd (9208); Eugenie Muggleton (9209, 9210 & 9211)
- Written by: Jason Herbison (9208 & 9209); Sarah Mayberry (9210); Shane Isheev (9211)
- Editing by: Kylie Robertson; Angelo Siderelis
- Original air date: 17–20 March 2025
- Running time: 88 minutes (4 x 22)

Guest appearances
- Ryan Moloney as Toadfish Rebecchi; Anne Charleston as Agnes Adair; Lucinda Cowden as Melanie Pearson; Rarmian Newton as Sebastian Metcalfe; Viva Bianca as Chelsea Murphy; Kate Connick as Fallon Morell; Hana Abe-Tucker as Isla Tanaka-Brennan; Nikita Kato as Abigail Tanaka; Charlie Lyon as Thomas Murphy; Ian Smith as Harold Bishop; Peter O'Brien as Shane Ramsay; Zima Anderson as Roxy Canning; Anne Scott Pendlebury as Hilary Robinson; Jack Hayes as Lachie Jensen; Bodhi as Trevor; Tim Potter as Jeffrey Swan; Mark Raffety as Darcy Tyler

Episode chronology
← Previous; Episode 9207	Next → Episode 9212

Neighbours 40th Anniversary is a group of four episodes of the Australian television soap opera Neighbours, broadcast on Network 10 each day from 17 to 20 March 2025. The episodes were directed by Harry Lloyd and Eugenie Muggleton. Executive producer Jason Herbison wrote the first two episodes, with Sarah Mayberry and Shane Isheev writing the remaining two. The opening titles were replaced with a special title card celebrating 40 years of the show.

Plans for the anniversary began once the show was picked up by Amazon in 2022. Herbison wanted to do something fresh for the 40th and focus on the future, compared to the nostalgic tone of previous anniversaries. Herbison and the production team settled on a celebration of "soapie twists and turns" with contemporary storylines that also honoured the serial's past. The episodes were planned to include elements that viewers loved about Neighbours, including big plots, new regular cast members, and appearances from returning characters. The anniversary uses Nell Rebecchi's (Ayisha Salem-Towner) "Story of Erinsborough" exhibition as a plot device to link past and present storylines. Herbison also wanted the episodes to be a catalyst for future plots that would continue over the coming months. To promote the anniversary, a theatre show titled Neighbours – The 40th Anniversary Tour was staged in the UK during February 2025. Herbison began promotion of the episodes in January 2025 and cast members were interviewed on television shows and by media outlets.

The anniversary begins with the wedding of Krista Sinclair (Majella Davis) and Leo Tanaka (Tim Kano), and the return of Chelsea Murphy (Viva Bianca) with her newborn son Thomas Murphy (Charlie Lyon), which causes big ramifications for Paul Robinson (Stefan Dennis). A fire at the local garage endangers the lives of five characters with Byron Stone (Xavier Molyneux) having to make an impossible choice, while the week ends with the mysterious death of Sebastian Metcalfe (Rarmian Newton). The anniversary received a mostly positive reaction from critics, with several of them including the episodes in their "Pick of the Day" features. Many critics enjoyed the "nods to the past", Chelsea's return and the revelation about Thomas' paternity, Charleston's arrival as Agnes, and Darcy's return. However, Neighbours' recent cancellation meant the anniversary was also described as "bittersweet" and "overshadowed".

== Plot ==
=== Episode 9208 (17 March 2025) ===
Nell Rebecchi (Ayisha Salem-Towner) attends the opening of an exhibition of her manga project in the Lassiters complex, which celebrates the history of Erinsborough. JJ Varga-Murphy (Riley Bryant) meets Agnes Adair (Anne Charleston) and notices her resemblance to Harold Bishop's (Ian Smith) deceased wife Madge Bishop. Krista Sinclair (Majella Davis) and Leo Tanaka (Tim Kano) prepare to marry, with Leo unaware that Krista had sex with Sebastian Metcalfe (Rarmian Newton) the night before. Krista's sister, Fallon Morell (Kate Connick), tells her that she lied about having sex with Leo, and the wedding proceeds without Krista confessing her infidelity. Seb appears at the wedding venue, but Fallon and Taye Obasi (Lakota Johnson) prevent him from intervening. Remi Varga-Murphy (Naomi Rukavina) locates her sister-in-law, Chelsea Murphy (Viva Bianca), aware that she has recently had a baby whose father may be Paul Robinson (Stefan Dennis). She brings Chelsea and her son, Thomas (Charlie Lyon), to Ramsay Street, shocking Paul and Terese Willis (Rebekah Elmaloglou).

=== Episode 9209 (18 March 2025) ===
Chelsea explains that either Paul or Jeffrey Swan (Tim Potter) is Thomas' father. They both agree to take a DNA test. Remi and Cara Varga-Murphy (Sara West) invite Chelsea to move in with them. Agnes visits the Eirini Rising retirement complex and meets Harold, who is shocked by her resemblance to Madge. They both conclude that it is best if she does not move in. Meanwhile, Max Ramsay (Ben Jackson) continues to hide out from criminal Carter, aided by his father Shane Ramsay (Peter O'Brien), Andrew Rodwell (Lloyd Will), Roxy Canning (Zima Anderson) and Holly Hoyland (Lucinda Armstrong Hall). Roxy is romantically pursued by Lachie Jensen (Jack Hayes) who, unbeknownst to her, has used her to locate Max. Byron Stone (Xavier Molyneux), his sister Nicolette Stone (Hannah Monson), and his girlfriend Sadie Rodwell (Emerald Chan) discover Max at Fitzgerald Motors with Roxy. Lachie throws a Molotov cocktail into the garage, setting it alight.

=== Episode 9210 (19 March 2025) ===
Roxy, Max and Byron escape the fire but Nicolette and Sadie become trapped. Bryon uses a fire blanket to re-enter the garage and saves Nicolette, leaving Sadie behind. A flaming beam falls onto Sadie, causing burns to her back. In hospital, Sadie refuses to see Byron, feeling betrayed by his actions. Lachie gives up Carter upon his arrest, and Max is relieved that his ordeal is over. Terese and Nell move in with Paul, who promises to not allow Chelsea to come between them if he is revealed to be Thomas' father. The test results reveal that Paul is the father.

=== Episode 9211 (20 March 2025) ===
Susan Kennedy (Jackie Woodburne) and Karl Kennedy (Alan Fletcher) are shocked when Susan's nephew, Darcy Tyler (Mark Raffety), is revealed as the tenant of Terese's house. Darcy assures them he has returned to Erinsborough to face his criminal past and make amends. Chelsea takes Thomas to Paul's penthouse, to Terese's discomfort. Krista tells Leo that she had sex with Sebastian and he returns to Erinsborough alone. Taye and Fallon see Sebastian in The Waterhole and attempt to convince him to leave Erinsborough. Later, Leo angrily confronts Sebastian, who taunts him about Krista. The following day, Sebastian's dead body is seen floating in Lassiters Lake.

== Production ==
=== Conception ===
Neighbours executive producer Jason Herbison began plans for the anniversary once the show was picked up by Amazon in 2022. He wanted to do something "fresh and interesting" with the 40th, compared to the nostalgic tone of the 30th and 35th anniversaries and 2022 finale, which featured many returning characters and large events. Herbison wanted to focus on the future, rather than a large number of returning characters, although he planned for "an element of that". He told Johnathon Hughes of the Radio Times that "there are elements of nostalgia but it's more about looking forward than looking back. We always want to honour the heritage of the show, but recognise we need to keep evolving." Herbison and the production team settled on a celebration of "big soapie twists and turns" with storylines that were contemporary, but also acknowledged the serial's past, aiming to "own the genre" of soap opera. Herbison told Hughes that the episodes would feature "everything our viewers love about Neighbours", including "big stories" and returning characters. He and the team wanted to highlight "the nature of classic, serial storytelling", so they used Nell Rebecchi's (Ayisha Salem-Towner) "Story of Erinsborough" exhibition as a plot device to link both the past and present. Herbison planned for the episodes to be a catalyst for the show's future plots. He additionally told Inside Soap's Laura-Jayne Tyler that "the 40th anniversary week sets in motion stories that will continue for months to come."

=== Cast ===
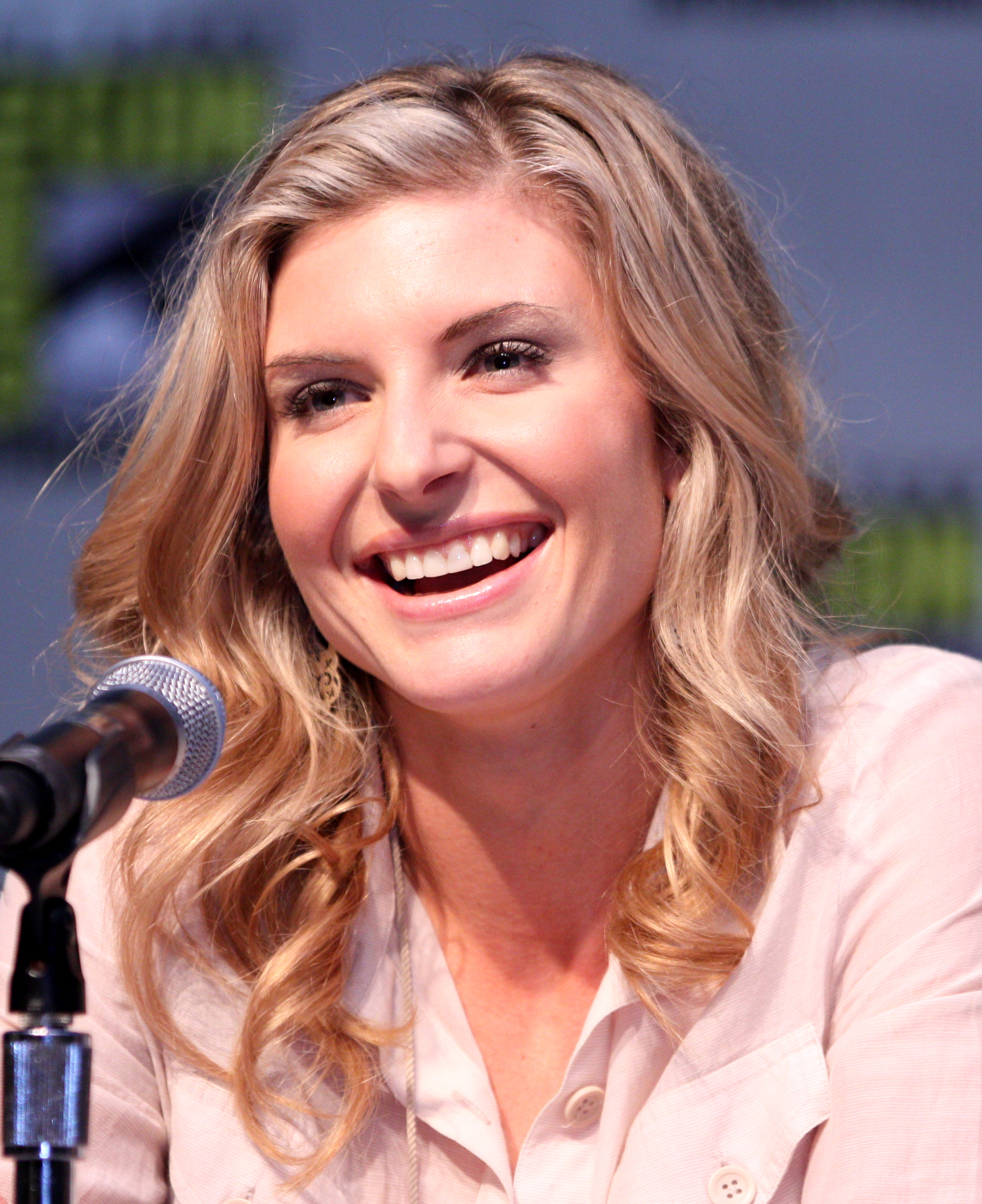
Viva Bianca's return as Chelsea was one of the anniversary's main storylines.

Ahead of the anniversary, it was reported that several former cast members would be returning to the soap. In January 2025, it was announced that Mark Raffety would be returning as Darcy Tyler. Raffety's return had originally been planned to occur before Neighbours was cancelled in 2022. Later that month, it was announced that Zima Anderson and Peter O'Brien would be returning as Roxy Willis and Shane Ramsay respectively. Rebekah Elmaloglou, who portrays Roxy's aunt Terese Willis, teased that Roxy would do some "naughty" things that would disappoint Terese, with the actress calling Anderson and Roxy a "breath of fresh air to have around". Returning cast member Viva Bianca also returns as Chelsea Murphy, following brief appearances in late 2024 and early 2025. Her return also features the introduction of her newborn baby Thomas Murphy (Charlie Lyon), whose paternity causes issues for other characters.

Another former cast member to return during the anniversary was Anne Charleston, who portrayed Madge Bishop on-off from 1986 until the character's death in 2001, with subsequent appearances as visions. Charleston's return to the soap had been announced in December 2024, as part of Smith's permanent departure from Neighbours following his terminal cancer diagnosis, with Neighbours teasing at the time, "in what context Anne will appear is yet to be revealed, but to have the iconic couple reunited will be one final treat for fans". Herbison explained that Charleston's appearance was a nod to previous actors who had returned as new characters. He also acknowledged that Smith's cancer diagnosis had changed plans for his and Charleston's characters, due to uncertainty around how long Smith would be able to continue filming. Long-term cast members Jackie Woodburne and Alan Fletcher, who play Susan Kennedy and Karl Kennedy respectively, also returned to the show following a filming break, while Candice Leask returned as Wendy Rodwell following an extended on-screen absence.

=== Storyline development ===
Michael Darling from Whattowatch.com interviewed Elmaloglou, Majella Davis (Krista Sinclair) and Tim Kano (Leo Tanaka) about the anniversary's storylines. Elmaloglou described "incredible" stories, adding "it's just bombshell after bombshell really." Davis said "there are lots of bombs being dropped on these poor characters and lots of reminiscing of the 40 years that Neighbours has been around." Kano concluded that the plots have numerous "omg moments" and "there's so much going on and fans are going to be really satisfied with all the nods to the past." Kano believed that the writers had created storylines to satisfy the show's entire fanbase, which pay homage to the past for long-term viewers and to the present for new viewers.

One of the anniversary's main storylines revolves around the wedding of Leo and Krista. Davis and Kano had an hour-long meeting with Herbison in 2024, where he discussed their upcoming storylines and revealed his plans for their role in the 40th anniversary. Herbison informed them that their wedding storyline would be jeopardised by infidelity and Davis assumed it would be Leo who cheats on Krista. However, Davis was shocked to learn it would be Krista who has sex with Sebastian Metcalfe (Rarmian Newton). Her betrayal occurs after being manipulated by her sister, Fallon Morell (Kate Connick) and Sebastian into believing that Leo has had sex with Fallon. Davis revealed that this made Krista's actions, which she described as "reckless", more justifiable. She explained that Krista wants to feel desired during her turmoil, adding "it was justifiable in my head, but also pretty heartbreaking." Kano added, "It didn't really settle in until we walked out of the meeting. We were heading back to the green room like: 'Hang on, what? What's going on?'" Kano also told Darling that the scenario is the characters' "worst nightmare, it's huge." Kano likened the build up to the wedding episode to a roller-coaster. He believed that there are "lots of mixed messages" and "a lot of people meddling with their relationship and trying to derail it." Fallon and Sebastian divulge all their secrets to Krista during the first anniversary episode. Davis noted that once Krista realises Fallon lied, "it's like the world is spinning around her." Their admission that they used to be in a relationship adds additional shock and Davis likened this narrative to a series of exploding bombs. Davis concluded that Krista's realisation of Leo being innocent is "just awful".

Davis told Chloe Timms from Inside Soap that the prelude to the wedding is a "classic irony of wires being crossed." Krista wanted the best for Fallon but ultimately fails to recognise that she and Sebastian are emotionally hurt in the story too. Fallon feels guilty and tries to convince Sebastian to leave Krista alone. Paul urges Krista to remove Sebastian from her life and marry Leo. At the wedding ceremony, it appears that Krista will not turn up. She arrives late and Leo's father Paul Robinson (Stefan Dennis) walks Krista down the aisle, while Sebastian arrives intending to ruin the wedding. Davis viewed the wedding as a "special" event and hoped it would be received as iconic and memorable as the wedding of Scott and Charlene Robinson in 1987. In another episode Leo discovers the truth and Kano doubted Leo could forgive Krista, branding it "the ultimate betrayal". Despite his reservations Kano viewed the plot as "juicy adult drama".

Chelsea's return was part of one of the anniversary week's main storylines, which included Chelsea returning with her newborn baby Thomas. This causes issues for Paul and his partner Terese, who want to find out Thomas is Paul's son. Spoilers for the soap showed that Chelsea would claim to be a "reformed character" in her return. Daniel Kilkelly of Digital Spy questioned whether Paul's life would "change forever" due to the implications of Chelsea's return.

Charleston's introduction was planned to help facilitate Harold's final departure from the show, after Smith was diagnosed with terminal cancer. Filming on the planned storyline between their characters became dependent on Smith's availability as he underwent treatment. Following the anniversary, Agnes was revealed to be biologically related to Madge. Elmaloglou "loved" that writers created a doppelganger storyline and revealed it created "really sweet" interactions between Agnes and Harold that "fans will love".

Darcy's return to the series provided new stories for Karl and Susan. Woodburne told David Knox from TV Tonight that Karl is still in recovery from a motorbike accident upon their return. Woodburne explained that Darcy immediately claims to be a reformed character. She added he "appears to have redeemed themselves and become a pillar of society, and therefore is very much welcomed back into the fold." Though she warned that Darcy's involvement "absolutely complicates" Karl's recovery and creates more drama in future storylines.

Another storyline featured Nell showcasing her artwork for the "Story of Erinsborough" exhibition, which depicted key moments and storylines from Neighbours' history. Neighbours posted a behind-the-scenes video on their social media discussing the artwork, with cast members Marley Williams (Dex Varga-Murphy) and Riley Bryant (JJ Varga-Murphy) joking about how Nell chose to include a scene of Toadie cheating on her mum with Andrea Somers (Madeleine West). Elmaloglou described it as an anchor story for the anniversary. She believed the in-universe aspects of the story were "really lovely" for the residents of Erinsborough to witness. She added that it was "great" for the actors too. Another plot featured in the week was a fire which occurs at the Fitzgerald Motors garage, created by script producer Shane Isheev. In the storyline, Byron chooses to save Nicolette before Sadie. Isheev approached Molyneux for his opinion on who he thought Byron should chose to save. He believed Byron would save Nicolette and Isheev informed him that he had already developed the story with that option.

=== Filming ===
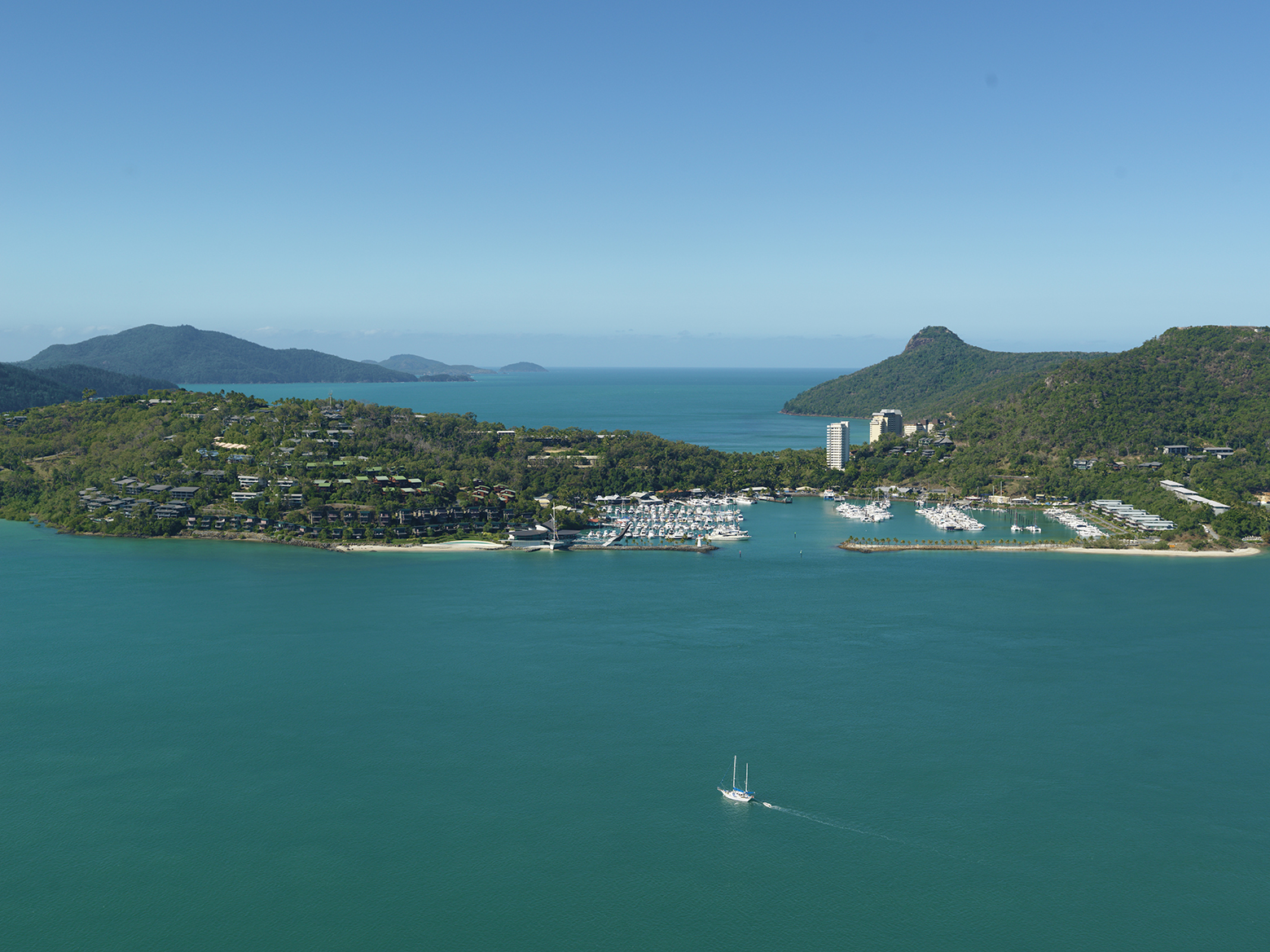
Neighbours filmed Krista and Leo's honeymoon scenes on location at Hamilton Island.

Kano recalled the "amazing" experience of arriving on location to film the wedding and knowing it would be central to the anniversary. During the wedding scenes, Krista wears a wedding dress which was designed by Nicholas Wakeley, inspired by Lady Gaga attire. The dress was tailor-made and it took thirty minutes for Davis to get into the costume. She had to dehydrate prior to the fitting because she did not want to use the bathroom and disrupt filming. Davis filmed Krista's entrance to the wedding venue on a boat. Various cast members were present during the shoot as their characters are guests attending the wedding. Another scene filmed at the location shoot required Davis and Kano to film in a vintage Rolls Royce car as they leave the venue.

The episodes also contained scenes of Krista and Leo on their honeymoon, filmed on location at Hamilton Island in Queensland. Many of the island's well known locations were used for filming, including the Coral Cove area, which was the location of the chair swing Krista and Leo were featured sitting on. The show's head of make up Alex Long posted pictures on-set showing beach areas being closed to the public to accommodate filming. Long revealed that the weather during filming was cold and windy. Neighbours hired sound recording company, Pender Audio, who specialise in location filming. They revealed that high winds and rain made mixing the sound challenging but they were successful. Hamilton Island Enterprises revealed that additional scenes filmed at their location would appear in future episodes. Pender Audio released on-set pictures featuring Matt Wilson, who plays Aaron Brennan filming for an unrelated storyline with another cast member.

Filming the fire on the set of the Fitzgerald Motors garage required careful planning. The scene revolves around a Molotov cocktail being thrown into the garage and setting it alight, requiring part of the set to be ablaze during filming. Stunt doubles were used for scenes featuring Bryon and Nicolette running through flames. Protective gel was applied to the stunt performers' faces and any exposed skin to avoid burns. Isheev, who wrote the story, was present on set for filming. Neighbours filmed backstage video content from the fire stunt, in which Jackson stated that the cinematography looked "unreal" and he was shocked that the film crew threw a flaming prop through a window on the garage set. Chan was also present in the video and she teased that the cast were filming drama, fun and some scary moments.

Filming of Sebastian's body in the lake required additional preparation. Make up artist Alex Long applied cosmetics to Newton to make him appear like a dead body. She explained that because Sebastian's body had been in the water overnight, any exposed skin needed to be "deadened up". Newton wore a wet suit vest under his shirt throughout filming to protect him from cold temperatures. The digital producer Tom Sage was present during filming the scenes at the lake. He explained that the "icky" water quality in the lake meant that cast members are not allowed to film in it. Director Eugenie Muggleton had a dummy made up to resemble Newton during filming. This was placed into the lake, with Newton appearing as Seb's body in scenes by the lakeside.

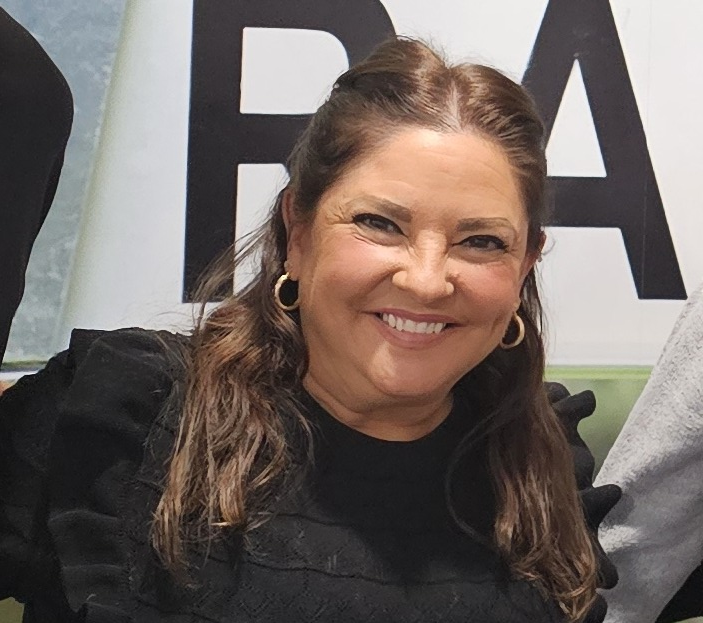
Rebekah Elmaloglou (Terese Willis) branded the cancellation news "sad and disappointing", but she was excited for fans to see the anniversary episodes.

=== Show cancellation ===
On 21 February 2025, three weeks before the 40th anniversary, it was announced that Amazon Prime Video had not renewed their commission of Neighbours, and the show would cease production in July 2025. TV historian Andrew Mercado, writing for The Sydney Morning Herald, stated that the anniversary celebrations would now be "bittersweet". He pointed out how British soap opera EastEnders had also recently celebrated their 40th anniversary with a live episode, an explosion stunt and special spin-offs, while he felt that Network 10 had all but given up on Neighbours. The sentiment was echoed by Dennis, who plays Paul, in an interview with TV Tonight's John Knox. He said the news of the show's cancellation had overshadowed the 40th anniversary and made it feel "a bit wishy-washy".

Dennis explained that the situation was "a bit of a shame" because "it's an incredible accolade for an Australian show to say they've been going for 40 years other than other than news and current affairs." He believed it was unfortunate "that's now being completely and utterly overshadowed by the fact that the show is now on its way out. So the 40th anniversary means nothing now." Dennis admitted to being frustrated at the way fellow soap Home and Away is promoted in Australia in comparison to Neighbours' little fanfare. He also expressed his frustration and disappointment over Amazon's decision not to continue the soap on Prime Video, following the closure of Amazon Freevee. Woodburne believed that the show's cancellation should not have detracted from the anniversary. She explained that "it's a very important moment to mark, and I think it is important to keep it in and of itself, despite everything else that's going on, because we don’t want to detract from how great and important a moment this is for all of us."

Elmaloglou was informed of the cancellation shortly after returning to Australia from Neighbours – The 40th Anniversary Tour. She did not think the decision made sense and felt bad for the fans of the show, saying "it's just so sad and disappointing". She told Radio Times' Hughes that she was still "excited" for viewers to see the 40th anniversary storylines and was proud to be a part of the soap's milestone. Knox thought the news made things surrounding the anniversary more awkward and noted that unlike the 30th anniversary in 2015, there would be no network party to celebrate the milestone. However, executive producer Jason Herbison confirmed that a screening of the episodes would be held on the day of anniversary (18 March 2025) for the cast and crew, after they made the decision to postpone it following the cancellation news. He said the situation was "a little bit of a dilemma", but they were all proud of the anniversary and the episodes, so they were "in celebration mode for it."

== Promotion and broadcast ==
External videos
- "Neighbours 40th Anniversary Week Teaser"; A promotional trailer for the episodes
- "Fire Strikes the Garage Neighbours"; A preview clip for Episode 9209

Neighbours began planning promotional events for their fortieth anniversary one year in advance. On 5 April 2024, it was announced that a theatre show titled Neighbours – The 40th Anniversary Tour would be staged in the UK during February 2025. It was billed as a celebratory touring show paying homage to four decades of the soap opera. It was produced by Maple Tree Entertainments and Fremantle, who previously devised and hosted Neighbours - The Celebration Tour in 2023. The tour took place from 3 to 18 February 2025 across six British cities and was hosted by news anchor Leah Boleto. The tour featured current cast members Rebekah Elmaloglou, Tim Kano, Majella Davis and Lucinda Cowden, and previous stars Kym Valentine (Libby Kennedy) and Dan Paris (Drew Kirk). It featured the cast being interview by Boleto about the show, characters and storylines. It also featured two musical numbers and hosted a range of video reels. Davis discussed Krista's involvement in the 40th anniversary week and teased the wedding storyline.

Herbison promoted the show's anniversary during a January 2025 interview published via Radio Times. On 10 March, Neighbours released a trailer video previewing the 40th anniversary week storylines. It promoted Krista and Leo's wedding and teased Agnes' arrival alongside Chelsea and Darcy's returns to Erinsborough, in addition to scenes from the garage fire and a dead body in Lassiter's lake. Neighbours also publicised promotional spoiler photographs for the weeks episodes following the anniversary. These previewed the aftermath of the mystery death storyline. The cast also gave interviews with media outlets promoting the stories of the 40th anniversary. These included Elmaloglou with Radio Times and Whattowatch.com, Woodburne and Dennis with TV Tonight, and Davis and Kano with Inside Soap, Digital Spy and Whattowatch.com. On 19 March, Angela Bishop interviewed Hannah Monson and Matt Wilson about the anniversary on the show 10 News First.

The special title card used for each episode.

To celebrate and promote the anniversary, Knox from TV Tonight compiled an article featuring birthday messages from twenty-three leading workers in Australian television industry. Personnel from the rival television channels Seven Network, Nine Network and Special Broadcasting Service took part and spoke about the show. It also attracted endorsements from guilds and alliances including Peter Mattessi (president of Australian Writers' Guild), Michael Balk (president of Media, Entertainment and Arts Alliance), Matt Deaner (CEO Screen Producers Australia), Sophie Harper (Executive director at Australian Directors' Guild), Caroline Pitcher (CEO at VicScreen), Bridget Fair (FreeTV Australia), Jenny Buckland (CEO Australian Children's Television Foundation), Thea McLeod (President of the Casting Guild of Australia), Kingston Anderson (Executive Director at Australian Guild of Screen Composers), Tony Gardiner (Australian Cinematographers Society), Marty Murphy (convener at Australian Film, Television and Radio School), Meagan Loader (Chief curator at the National Film and Sound Archive). In addition former Neighbours casting director Jan Russ, TV Week Editor Stephen Downie and television historian Andrew Mercado, AACTA Awards CEO Damian Trewhella and Deborah Richards from Netflix ANZ.

Episodes 9208–9211 were originally broadcast on 17, 18, 19 and 20 March 2025 respectively. In Australia they premiered on Network 10 at 4PM daily and were later made available to watch via the streaming service 10Play. In the UK and US they were made available to stream for free through Amazon Prime Video. Each episode featured in the anniversary week did not feature any opening titles. Instead a special title card celebrating 40 years of the show was used in their place at the beginning of episodes. The following week the opening title sequence was updated to feature Charleston after her return during the anniversary.

== Reception ==
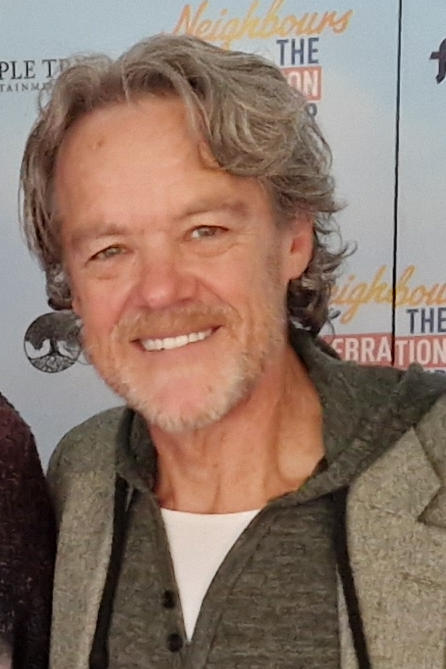
Stefan Dennis received praise for his performance in the anniversary episodes, with one critic stating that his character was able to "spring the surprises" 40 years on from his first appearance.

The anniversary episodes received positive reviews from television critics. Chloe Timms from Inside Soap wrote how the anniversary week was a "fantastic celebration of old and new", noting that their readers enjoyed the nostalgia and "new twists". Nicola Tucker of the TVTimes gave the anniversary episodes four out of five stars, advising viewers to "savour the 40th anniversary celebration" amid the serial's cancellation. Referring to Chelsea's baby surprise, Tucker quipped that four decades on, Paul Robinson "can still spring the surprises". Johnathon Hughes from Radio Times chose the anniversary episode on 18 March as part of his "Pick of TV & Film on Demand" feature. In his opinion, the cancellation news did not "curtail celebrations" and he branded the anniversary episodes "a blockbuster week". His colleague Laura Denby called Charleston's return to the soap in the episodes as a new character a "twist" and wondered if the soap was "unveiling another secret long-lost twin saga". Michael Adams from Metro called the episodes "explosive".

Closer magazine's Caroline Blight chose Neighbours as one of her "TV Top Picks" for the week of 15–20 March 2025. Michael Darling from Woman's Own included the anniversary in the magazine's "Soap Moment of the Week" feature, describing it as a "big week of drama and plenty of nods to the past." Writing for Whattowatch.com, Darling reviewed that "it's going to be epic, with lots of drama and nods to the past." Writing for Chat, Darling branded Agnes' arrival as a "soap shocker" and summarised the anniversary as "a big week of a drama". A What's on TV writer chose episode 9208 as the week's "must-see" instalment, adding that the entire week features "big drama". Mark Peters from Total TV Guide chose episode 9210 as the magazines "must see" pick and assessed the fire plot was a "terrifying fight for survival".

Conor McMullan of Digital Spy praised the anniversary episodes for celebrating the show's "past, present and the potential future." He wrote that there was "a great balance of the nostalgia that viewers expect from Neighbours", as well as a feeling of looking to the future with several new storylines. He also lamented how the show's cancellation put "a major dampener" on the celebrations, which he felt was unfair to the cast and crew who had created "a great week of episodes". He noted that the 40th was "a subdued affair" compared to the 35th anniversary, which featured a number of returning characters and a big ending to a long-running story arc, but he did not think that was necessarily a bad thing, as current plots came to a climax and the focus was mostly on the present cast. McMullan thought the "strongest scenes" belonged to storyline between Chelsea and Paul, as it ended a long wait for answers from viewers following Chelsea's original exit. He branded the plot "fresh, unexplored territory for Paul", and also praised the decision to involve some of the soap's "strongest performers" in Dennis, Elmaloglou, Sara West, and Naomi Rukavina. McMullan also dubbed Darcy's return as a "highlight" of the anniversary, as the writers finally had the chance to explore the character further. He also noted the "scepticism" surrounding Charleston's return as Agnes, but felt that she and Smith still had the chemistry they were known for and both gave "poignant, human performances" despite the "soapy" doppelganger storyline. The character-driven scenes received the most praise from McMullan, who stated that Neighbours "is still capable of delivering stories with twists and turns but in choosing to lead with compelling character-driven drama", adding that it "proved that there was enough life in the old dog yet to go way beyond its 40 years."

McMullan was more critical of the garage fire storyline, the wedding, and Sebastian's death. He said the fire scenes were "well-directed and very tense", but bemoaned the quick conclusion to the arc. He thought the focus on the characters involved and how the fire impacted them was a good move, and noted that Chan's "heartbreaking performance" as Sadie dealt with her injuries was some of her best work. McMullan said that despite the "stunning location", Leo and Krista are not "an iconic golden couple" and thus Krista's affair with Sebastian injected "much-needed jeopardy" to a story that was lacking. He branded Sebastian's death and the following whodunnit "a dark, striking end to the week", but also "overdone", and he was hopeful that the show would wrap it up quickly, especially with the show ending and viewers being unlikely to care.

Harriet Mitchell from Digital Spy called Nell's artwork depicting the infidelity in her parents' marriage an "unusual" choice. Daniel Kilkelly from the same website believed that it was bold of Chelsea to say that she was a "reformed character". Kilkelly also called Chelsea's return "dramatic" and noted that it brought "shocking baby drama". He also called the anniversary week episodes "unmissable".
