= Neighbours – The 40th Anniversary Tour =

2025 theatre production

- Company: Maple Tree Entertainment; Fremantle
- Genre: Television
- Show type: Conversational
- Date of premiere: 3 February 2025
- Final show: 18 February 2025
- Location: United Kingdom

Other information
- Executive producer: Mellissa Julians
- Producer: Dean Elliot
- Director: Joe Julians
- Host: Leah Boleto
- Official website

Neighbours – The 40th Anniversary Tour was a 2025 British touring theatre production about the Australian soap opera Neighbours. The tour was a successor to 2023's "Neighbours - The Celebration Tour". It was created to celebrate the show's fortieth anniversary. It was produced by Maple Tree Entertainments and licensed by Fremantle. The show was presented by Leah Boleto throughout its run.

The show's concept incorporates several Neighbours cast members being interviewed about the show by a host speaker. The cast share personal stories, perform musical numbers and perform a theatrical performance. The cast also take part in an interactive question and answer session. Meet and greet sessions with fans were also held at each venue. The tour began on 3 February 2025 at Symphony Hall in Birmingham and concluded at the Bridgewater Hall in Manchester on 18 February 2025. There were six shows in total. The tour featured the cast members Rebekah Elmaloglou, Lucinda Cowden, Kym Valentine, Dan Paris, Tim Kano and Majella Davis.

The show is stylised as a live in conversational format. It featured Boleto interviewing cast members about Neighbours and their character's storylines. Other segments included video reels containing footage from the show, a live question and answer session with the audience and a tribute to former Neighbours cast member Janet Andrewartha, who died in 2024. Cowden also wrote and performed her own musical number, titled "Poor Mel". The show was received positively but Neighbours itself was cancelled three days after the tour concluded.

== Creation and background ==
In 2023, Maple Tree Entertainments and Fremantle devised and hosted "Neighbours - The Celebration Tour", a multi-show theatre touring production featuring members of the cast discussing stories about Neighbours and their characters' storylines. Neighbours had previously been cancelled by Channel 5 and ended in 2022. It was later recommissioned by Amazon MGM Studios and returned in 2023, allowing the soap to reach its fortieth broadcasting year anniversary. On 5 April 2024, it was announced that a new tour titled Neighbours - The 40th Anniversary Tour would be staged in the UK in February 2025. It was billed as a celebration of four decades of the soap opera complete with "a new line-up, new stories, and a brand-new reason to celebrate in the tour."

== Production ==
=== Casting ===
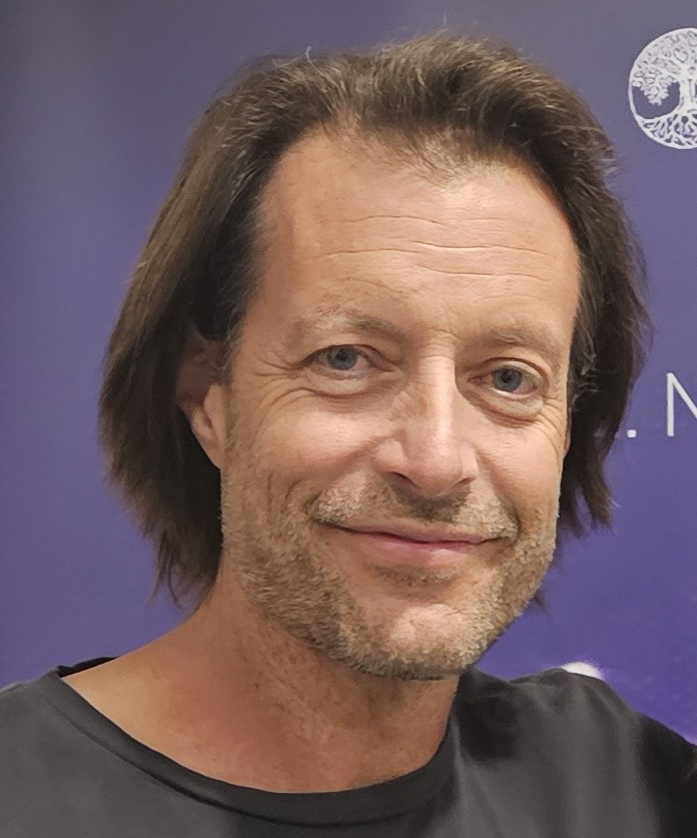
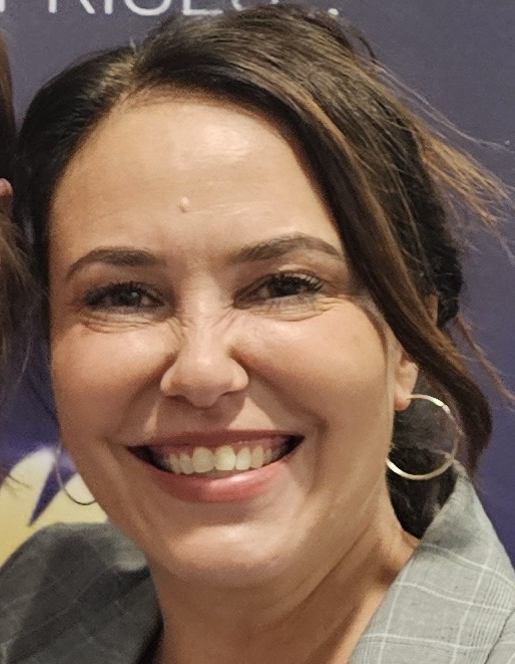
Dan Paris and Kym Valentine were reunited at the tour for the first time since Paris left the show.

On 5 August 2024, the tour announced their first three cast signings. They were Rebekah Elmaloglou who plays Terese Willis, Tim Kano who plays Leo Tanaka and Majella Davis who portrays Krista Sinclair. The trio were all current cast members at the time of the casting announcement. Elmaloglou was long-standing cast member, beginning in the series in 2013. Kano and Davis' characters were written into a romance storyline in the soap. Melanie Pearson actress Lucinda Cowden was announced as the fourth cast member joining on 31 October 2024. Her inclusion was revealed the same week it was announced Cowden's character Melanie was being written out of Neighbours. Cowden stated her excitement of being cast in the tour and what fans could expect from it. On 5 November 2024, Kym Valentine and Dan Paris, who play Libby Kennedy and Drew Kirk respectively were announced as the final two cast members. The duo's characters were married in the show's storyline and their inclusion marked a reunion for the two following Paris' departure from the soap more than twenty years before. Valentine claimed they had not seen each other since Paris left the show. She recalled he messaged her revealing his participation in the tour, stating he was "thrilled" to have "another adventure" with her. Cowden praised the show's completed cast as a "fantastic" and "fun group" of actors.

=== Concept ===
The shows were designed to follow a similar theme to those on the previous tour. Upon the tour's announcement, it was revealed that the it would feature an entirely different cast line-up and offer fans "new stories, and a brand-new reason to celebrate." The main theme of the tour was celebrating the show's fortieth anniversary and the cast would honour four decades of storylines. It was also touted as "the ultimate toast to over 9000 episodes of Neighbours." Maple Tree Entertainment hired Joe Julians as the show's writer. Mellissa Julians returned as the show's executive producer and Dean Elliot assumed the role of the show's manager and producer. Leah Boleto was hired as the tour's presenter, she had previously presented the UK shows of "Neighbours - The Celebration Tour". She is a Sky News presenter and "a self-professed super fan of the show."

Elmalogou, who plays Terese, revealed that the show would follow a similar format to the previous tour. She revealed it was stylised as a live chat show hosted on a theatrical stage. She noted the inclusion of discussions about the soap opera's characters, their previous storylines and videos containing old footage. She also teased "there also might be a little song and dance." Cowden told Behnaz Akhgar from BBC Radio Wales that the show features "hilarious" and memorable cast members coming together telling secrets. She added it incorporates "behind the scenes secrets and stories", a "big embracing of the whole show" and "just being able to share that stuff with the people it really means something to." Elmaloglou and Cowden described segments of the show featuring them discussing their own backgrounds, their characters storylines, the history of the show, their backstage relationships with other colleagues. Cowden added it the show transformed into "a really intimate experience" for the audience, despite them being staged in big arenas.

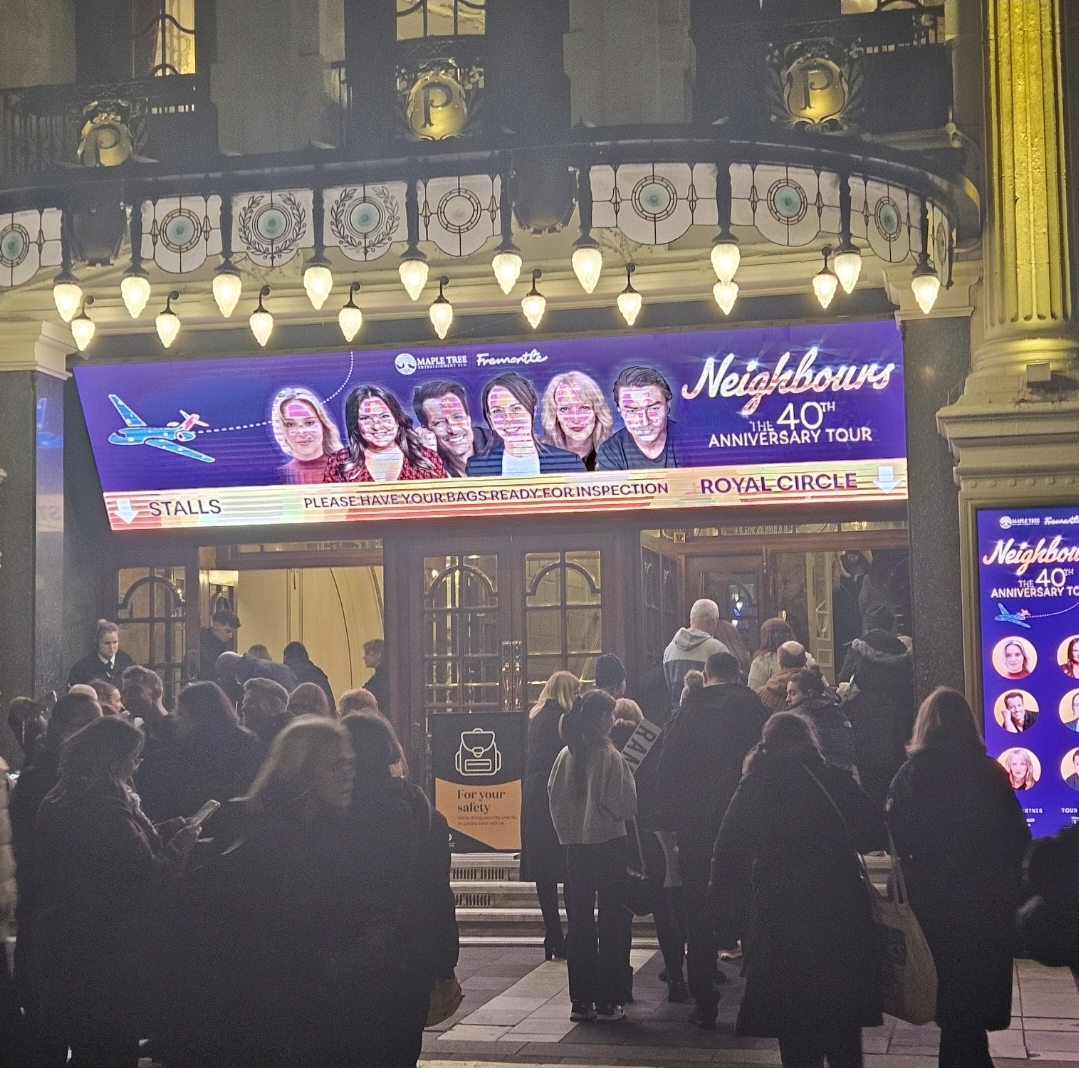
The iconic London Palladium entrance with the Neighbours cast displayed

The show also features a question and answer session from attendees. Another segment features a video reel containing bloopers and outtakes from the filming of the series. Other segments included the cast paying tribute and sharing their memories of Lyn Scully actress Janet Andrewartha, who had died in 2024. Another featured health updates about long-term cast member Ian Smith's (Harold Bishop) cancer prognosis. To help close each show, Cowden performed a musical number titled "Poor Mel". Cowden first discussed the song in November 2024 and revealed that producers had tasked her with writing a "funny song" to perform on the tour. She told Michael Adams from Metro that "I'm not a singer, so it's gotta be funny. There's no Alan Fletcher in our show this time around. The piece formed part of the show's finale number, Cowden described the finished work as a "silly" song. It contains 783 words that she had to recite and it chronicles the character of Melanie and her storyline journey from 1987 to 2024.

Elmalogou revealed that the cast were having "so much fun" preparing for the tour. She noted that herself, Kano, Cowden and Davis were already "close friends" prior to coming to the tour. Elmalogou described herself, Cowden and Valentine as "the loudest three women ever" and jested that the other cast may not be able to get their turn to speak.

== Credits ==
=== Cast ===
- Lucinda Cowden
- Majella Davis
- Rebekah Elmaloglou
- Tim Kano
- Kym Valentine
- Dan Paris
- Host - Leah Boleto

=== Production team ===
- Production company - Maple Tree Entertainment
- Licensor - Freemantle Australia
- General manager, producer - Dean Elliot
- Executive producer - Mellissa Julians
- Writer, director - Joe Julians
- Company tour manager - Charles Blyth
- Production / sound - John Varley
- Sound 2 / AV - Craig Mitchell
- Technical supplier - Thames Audio
- Head of marketing and digital - Al Lockhart-Morley
- Head of design and media - Alex Bradbury
- Programme editor - Joe Julians
- Senior graphics designer - Jack Rochford
- Print and design administrator - Megan Bassett
- Publicist - Charlotte Wheeler
- Marketing administrator - Katie Owens
- Front of house manager - Emma Kurjj
- Trucking - SVL
- Merchandise supplier - Goldups Lane Entertainment

== Promotion and venues ==
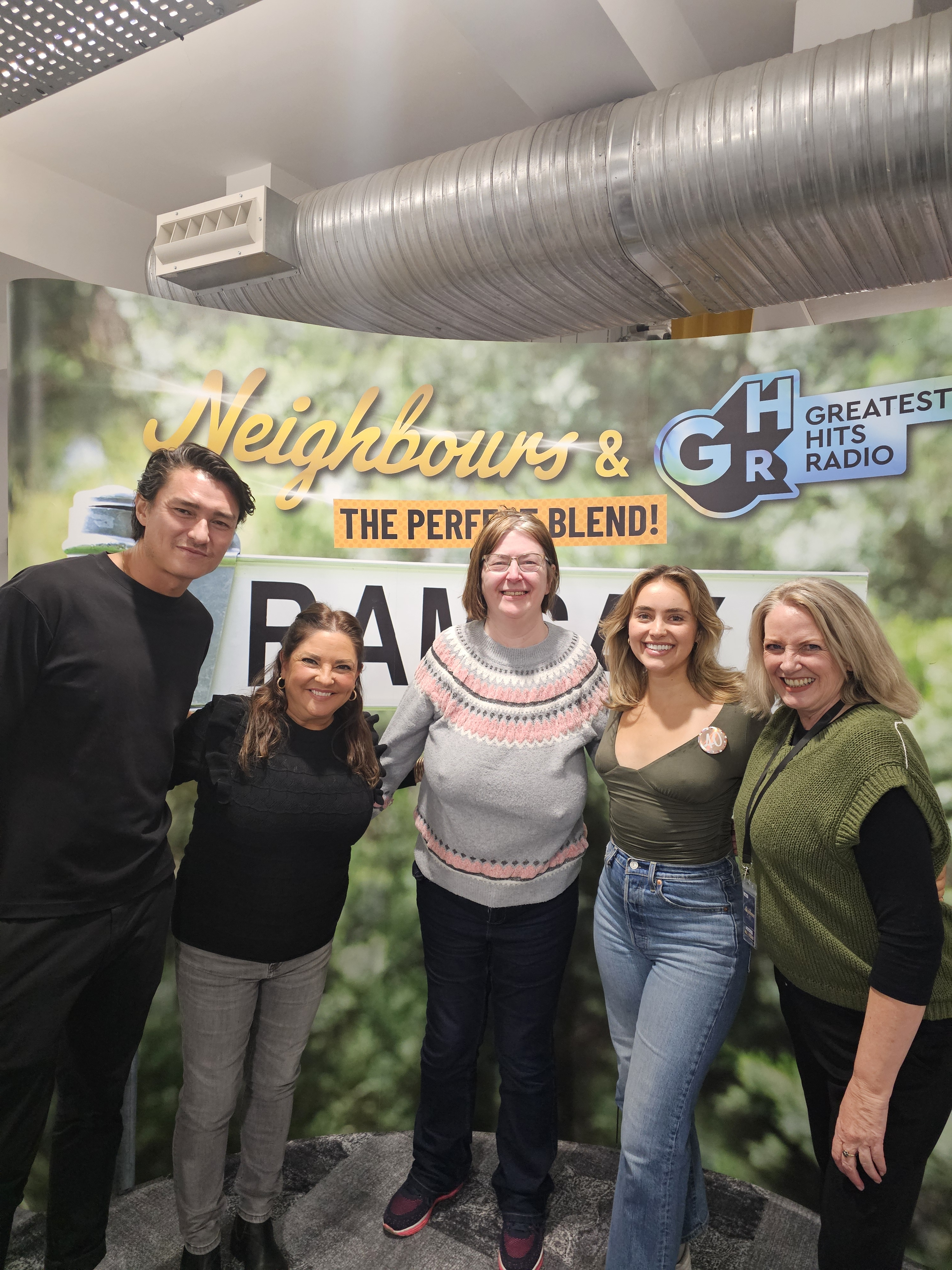
Tim Kano, Rebekah Elmaloglou, a Neighbours fan, Majella Davis and Lucinda Cowden at the Newcastle show's VIP meet and greet event.

The tour organisers secured a partnership with Greatest Hits Radio to be their official media outlet. The production also partnered with Hilton Worldwide, which became the official tour sponsor. The production hired Goldups Lane Entertainment as a marketing and design agency. The company also became the official merchandise supplier for the tour. They produced an official "Ramsay Street" sign, a tour shirt, a fridge magnet and a "through the years" tote bag featuring the different variations of the Neighbours logo. The production partnered with Rayo and Magic Radio to give away tickets via a competition. The soap opera magazine Inside Soap advertised the tour and ran a free ticket competition for its readers.

On 5 April 2024, the show's venues and tour dates were announced. Pre-sale tickets were made available on 8 April with general sale tickets being made available from 10 April. In addition to the main tour, the promoter planned VIP meet and greet sessions with the show's cast at each venue. On 22 April 2024, Neighbours announced that it would not be adding anymore tour dates. They did offer additional VIP meet and greet tickets to meet buyer demand across all venues aside from Manchester's Bridgewater Hall. The VIP tickets also included a photo opportunity with the show's cast, an official tour poster and an additional "special gift".

The cast began participating in a promotional campaign for the tour, which included television and radio appearances beginning in January 2025. In addition they also were interviewed via news websites and magazines. In the 4–10 January issue of Inside Soap, Valentine and Paris were interviewed by Steven Murphy about the tour. Elmaloglou also promoted the tour via social media, revealing she was shopping for winter attire during the Melbournian summer. On 31 January, Kano and Cowden appeared on BBC Radio WM and were interviewed by Sarah Julian to promote the tour.

On 5 February 2025, Elmaloglou featured in a Radio Times interview about the tour. Valentine appeared on the 11 February edition of the Channel 5 talk show, Jeremy Vine to promote the tour. On 6 February, Valentine appeared on BBC Radio Scotland's "The Afternoon Show" to promote the tour's Glasgow show and the 'Neighbours anniversary. She discussed the tour and her experiences from the first show in Birmingham. Valentine told Michelle McManus that the atmosphere at the there was "mad" and "overwhelming". She added "it was insane, I felt like a Beatle." On 13 February, Elmaloglou, Cowden and Paris appeared on ITV morning This Morning. They discussed their experience of appearing on stage at the London Palladium on the previous evening. Also that day, Cowden and Davis appeared on BBC Radio Wales to promote the tour and were interviewed by Behnaz Akhgar. They were mainly promoting the Cardiff show, held at the Wales Millennium Centre. Cowden revealed that a previous Neighbours cast member works at the Wales Millennium Centre and could possibly make an appearance.

The tour was designed to be a six date show to be held in various cities in the UK. The tour began on 3 February 2005 at Symphony Hall in Birmingham and concluded at the Bridgewater Hall in Manchester on 18 February 2005.

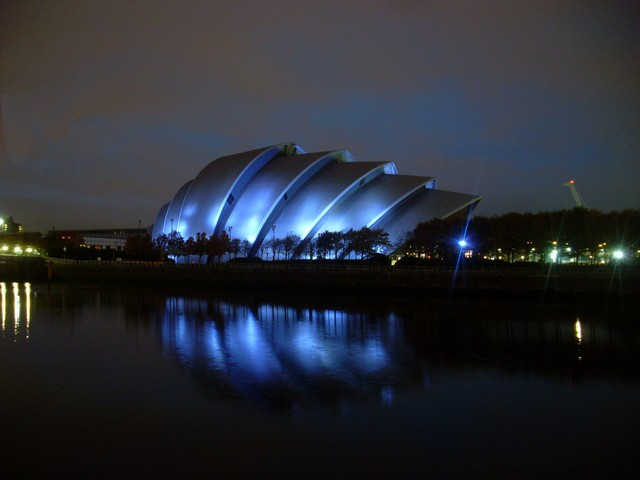
On 7 February, the tour was staged at Glasgow's SEC Armadillo auditorium.

List of tour dates and venues:
Date	City	Venue	Source
3 February	Birmingham	Symphony Hall	
5 February	Newcastle	O2 City Hall	
7 February	Glasgow	SEC Armadillo	
12 February	London	The Palladium	
16 February	Cardiff	Wales Millennium Centre	
18 February	Manchester	Bridgewater Hall	

== Cancellation of Neighbours ==
At the tour's final show, at Manchester's Bridgewater Hall, Elmaloglou addressed the audience about Neighbours' future. The tour was held during a time of uncertainty, as the show awaited to hear if Amazon MGM Studios would be renewing the series beyond its two-year-deal. She urged fans to contact Amazon directly and tell them how much they love the show. Daniel Kilkelly and Erin Zammitt reported that it was the first time the cast had "openly addressed the soap's future" during the tour. Three days after the final show, it was confirmed that Amazon had decided not to renew Neighbours and the show would be ending once again.

== Reception ==
Professional ratings
Review scores
Source	Rating
Manchester Theatres	5/5 stars
London Theatres	5/5 stars

Robert Jones writing for Manchester Theatres and London Theatres gave the show a five-star positive review. He praised Boleto's presenting skills, adding that her "confidence in her presentation was simply flawless." Roberts likened the latter half of the presentation, which featured all six cast members present as an Australian version of the female chat-show Loose Women. He opined that the female cast dominated the show, with Kano and Paris "quietly sitting like bookends". Though he praised the on-stage chemistry between the cast as "gorgeous". He also praised the use of background videos because they complimented what the cast were talking about. He singled out the "major highlights" of the show as being the video bloopers reel and Cowden's vocal performance. Roberts also described the show as a "rollercoaster of emotions", especially the segments on Andrewartha and Smith.

Charlotte Wheeler from National World stated that the show opened to a standing ovation. She noted it followed the "phenomenal sell out success" of the previous tour and a "brand-new reason to celebrate". Digital Spy's Kilkelly and Zammitt described it as a "celebratory event" and noted that the "cast took the time to warmly thank fans for their devoted efforts to save Neighbours."
