= Roxy Willis =

- Neighbours character
- Portrayed by: Zima Anderson
- Duration: 2019–2022, 2025
- First appearance: 29 April 2019
- Last appearance: 11 December 2025
- Introduced by: Jason Herbison
In-universe information
- Occupation: Back Lane Bar co-owner Bartender
- Family: Ramsay/Willis
- Father: Adam Willis
- Mother: Gemma Ramsay
- Husband: Kyle Canning (2022–)
- Sons: Jett Canning
- Aunts: Terese Willis (in-law)
- First cousins: Paige Smith; Imogen Willis; Ned Willis
- Other relatives: Shane Ramsay

Roxy Canning (also Willis) is a fictional character from the Australian television soap opera Neighbours, played by Zima Anderson. Anderson secured the role two years after relocating to Melbourne in the hope that she might win a part on the show. She felt that she was able to bring her own experience of moving from a regional town to the suburbs to the role. Her future co-star Jemma Donovan also auditioned for Roxy before she was cast as Harlow Robinson. Roxy was initially billed as being a relative of established character Terese Willis (Rebekah Elmaloglou), before it was revealed that she is the daughter of Terese's former brother-in-law Adam Willis (Ian Williams) and his wife Gemma Ramsay, whose actress Beth Buchanan reprised her role to facilitate Roxy's arrival. Anderson made her first appearance as Roxy during the episode broadcast on 29 April 2019.

The character was initially portrayed as a wild, headstrong girl from the Northern Territory. Anderson called Roxy ambitious, obnoxious, and high energy, which is reflected in her introduction when she parties at the local bar. Anderson thought this would give her the chance to show different sides of Roxy's personality as she grows up and she was hopeful of the chance to explore Roxy's vulnerable side. Anderson believed Roxy was the type of character viewers would love or love to hate. Roxy is brought to Erinsborough by her mother, who hopes that Terese can help curb her rebellious ways. Roxy's older boyfriend Vance Abernethy (Conrad Coleby) is soon introduced and it emerges that he also dated Terese. Anderson thought Vance and Roxy worked well as a couple and said Roxy was besotted with him. The pair scheme to sell a stolen race horse, which Terese exposes causing Vance to flee. Anderson said Roxy is hurt when she learns about Vance and Terese's past relationship, leading her to get revenge by kissing Terese's fiancé Paul Robinson (Stefan Dennis).

Roxy becomes a surprise love interest for Mark Brennan (Scott McGregor), and scenes showing how the characters got together were shown in a flashback. They establish a casual relationship, which becomes toxic. The plot allowed Anderson to show Roxy's softer side. Towards the end of the year, Roxy is brought into David Tanaka's (Takaya Honda) health storyline, when she turns out to be kidney match for him. Anderson described Roxy as being "pretty reluctant" to donate a kidney to David, as they are not blood relatives and she could face her own health issues in the future. Writers also formed a friendship between Roxy and her co-worker Shane Rebecchi (Nicholas Coghlan), after she confides in him about being a match for David. Anderson enjoyed working with Coghlan on the storyline and thought they had a similar bond to their characters. The friendship is tested when Roxy kisses Shane and then urges him not to tell his wife out of fear of being branded a homewrecker. Shane later manipulates Roxy and abuses their relationship when he develops a drug addiction. Coghlan described Shane's actions towards Roxy as brutal and cruel.

A romance develops between Roxy and Kyle Canning (Chris Milligan) in episodes broadcast in March 2020. The show's executive producer Jason Herbison said the pair had great chemistry, and both Anderson and Milligan thought Roxy and Kyle were a good match. The couple overcome several obstacles together, including family opposition and Kyle's testicular cancer diagnosis. The relationship leads to the couple's eventual marriage. Anderson admitted to being shocked that Roxy was going to be married so soon, but felt it was something her character had always dreamt of. In her final storylines, Roxy feuds with Amy Greenwood (Jacinta Stapleton) over the managers job at the Flamingo Bar, and undergoes IVF treatment in order to conceive her and Kyle's first child. Anderson was grateful for the chance to portray a couple who were struggling to conceive. After learning Roxy is pregnant, the couple decide to relocate to Darwin and their exits aired in May 2022. Anderson and Milligan's departures had been scripted before it was announced Neighbours had been cancelled. Anderson was pleased with Roxy's exit story and grateful that she and Kyle were allowed to leave together. Anderson later made a cameo appearance in June, followed by a longer guest stint in July 2022. She returned again in February 2025 for the soap's 40th anniversary, when it was revealed that she had given birth to a son, Jett. Roxy returned again in December 2025, for the show's final episode.

== Casting ==
On 14 April 2019, Susannah Alexander of Digital Spy reported that producers would be introducing Roxy Willis, a relative of established character Terese Willis (Rebekah Elmaloglou) later that month. Zima Anderson was cast in the role two years after relocating from her home town of Burnie to Melbourne, where she had hoped to secure a part on Neighbours. She believed that as a young woman who had moved from a regional area to the suburbs, she would be able to bring some of own experience to the role. Of joining the cast, Anderson said "I've been so lucky with the role of Roxy, I've already found myself in a wide range of crazy situations from virtually the first scene which has been so much fun and really challenged me, I'm constantly learning." Anderson began filming at the start of the year, and admitted to being nervous about entering the studio for the first time. She made her first appearance as Roxy during the episode broadcast on 29 April 2019.

During her appearance on co-star Takaya Honda's YouTube series Tak Talks, Jemma Donovan revealed that she had also gone up for the role of Roxy, however, she felt the character was not right for her. She said "I auditioned for Roxy, and I remember getting the scripts and I was like, 'Gosh, Neighbours is getting raunchy!' I was like, 'Oh my god, this 18-year-old, I don't know if I can play this!'" Donovan later secured the role of Harlow Robinson. Anderson said she and Donovan had formed "a beautiful friendship", after welcoming her to the cast.

== Development ==
=== Characterisation ===
Roxy is established as the daughter of former characters Gemma Ramsay (Beth Buchanan) and Adam Willis (Ian Williams), Terese's former brother-in-law. She was billed as Terese's niece, but Anderson pointed out that she is not actually related to Terese by blood. Roxy was initially characterised as "a wild girl from the Northern Territory". Anderson called her character "explosive", "very fun and very naughty". She also described her as being "full of heart and she is bubbly and sporadic and does whatever she wants." Like her character, Anderson moved from a regional area to Melbourne, which allowed her to bring the experience of a "small town mindset of wanting to do bigger and better things" to the role. The character's profile on the official Neighbours website states that she is "headstrong", has "a nose for trouble" and enjoys pushing boundaries. While she comes across as "fearless", the website said Roxy has much to learn about the world. They also stated that she would be a loyal friend if you get on her right side, but if you cross her then watch out.

A few months after her arrival, Anderson called Roxy "impulsive and confident", believing that the audience "heard her loud and clear!" She also thought that Roxy was a character viewers either loved or loved to hate. She admitted that she cared about people too much to do the things that Roxy did, such as making trouble and feeling like she has upset someone. Anderson liked Roxy's style and how she allowed other people to have fun, saying "She just wants everyone to loosen up and be themselves." However, Anderson also said that if she were friends with Roxy in real life, she would want to give Roxy a talking to about some of the things she says. She did not think hating yourself was a good excuse for bullying, and hoped that her character would find more kindness within herself. She added that she would still accept Roxy for who she is, as no one is bad for no reason.

Anderson confirmed that as Roxy settles into Erinsborough, she would start to show a different side of her personality. She told Daniel Kilkelly of Digital Spy: "Roxy is definitely full of energy, so her introduction to the show was great. I think that gives her a lot more room to show different sides to herself in the future. Roxy has come in with such strong ambitions. She's a little bit obnoxious, she's very fun and youthful. But that's going to give her so much more of a journey." Anderson hoped the viewers would enjoy her character's journey and how much she would change while she was on the show. Anderson also wanted to explore her character's vulnerable side, pointing out that Roxy was still a child and prone to mistakes. She thought Roxy did the "wild and crazy" stuff because that is what other people expect from her, but viewers would see more than the confident girl who does what she wants. She added "It comes from such a deeper place and from other experiences she's had in life. She's just trying to find herself as a person, like the rest of us."

In December 2020, Anderson said there would be some "classic Roxy antics" coming up, and she would make some mistakes, which she always does. She hoped viewers would have fun watching her character, as she had playing her. She also said that she wanted to take part in some stunts, explaining "Roxy always gets into sticky situations – she has the best of intentions, but then she feels bad when it all goes wrong, as she didn't expect it."

=== Introduction and early storylines ===
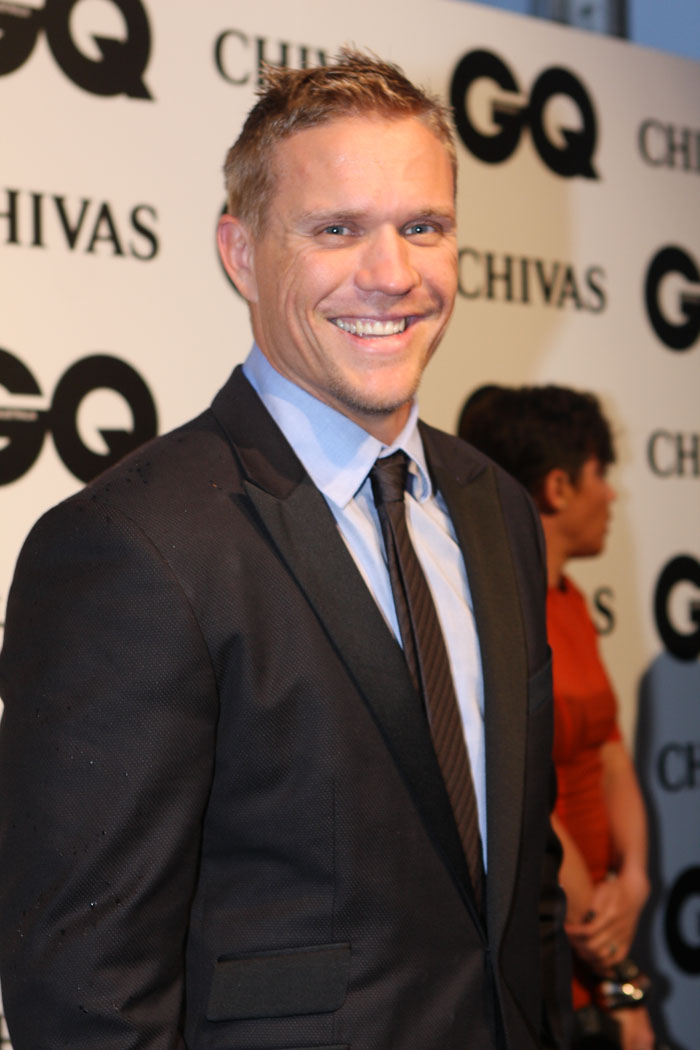
Roxy's older boyfriend Vance, played by Conrad Coleby (pictured), was introduced shortly after her arrival and revealed to have previously dated Terese.

Buchanan reprised her role for the first time since 1991 to facilitate Roxy's introduction. Gemma hopes that Terese can sort out Roxy's rebellious ways and draws on her wild past in Darwin as she persuades her into letting Roxy move in. Roxy makes an instant impression by partying at The Waterhole and tempting Leo Tanaka (Tim Kano) to drink a shot from her belly button. Of the moment, Anderson said "Roxy wants to make every moment fun. If she can party, she will! So why not drink a shot of tequila while laying across a bar?" The scene was the first Anderson filmed for the serial and she admitted that she was both nervous and excited about it. Anderson said this behaviour and the fact she does not know when to stop is why Gemma decides to uproot Roxy's life. She told Inside Soap's Alice Penwill that some of Roxy's past questionable actions have caught up with her and she needs a fresh start. Terese expresses sympathy for Roxy, and later explains to her daughter Imogen Willis (Ariel Kaplan) that she was in a similar situation when she was younger, after being led astray by her boyfriend at the time. Roxy gets off to a bad start with both Terese and her fiancé Paul Robinson (Stefan Dennis), but Anderson said Roxy really wants to get on with Terese as she looks up to her. She also said that while it seems her parents are pushing her away, Roxy does not necessarily see it as a bad thing, as she can learn from Terese. Roxy's cousin Ned Willis (Ben Hall) becomes suspicious about her sudden arrival and learns that she is lying about some events in her past.

Roxy goes into business with Leo when they buy a local bar together. She attempts to promote the venture by setting up a mechanical ball in the Lassiters complex, but Paul forces her to move it and she relocates it to the Willis house. While Paul is "furious" with the move, Terese is reminded of her youth and has a go on the bull with Roxy's encouragement. During the ride, Terese's former boyfriend Vance Abernethy (Conrad Coleby) arrives and it emerges that he is now in a relationship with Roxy. Anderson said Roxy is besotted with Vance. She described their relationship to Penwill: "He is a big ball of heart, and Roxy totally wears the trousers in the relationship! I think Roxy brings out the youth in him, and Vance brings out the woman in Roxy. There's a nice balance despite the age difference – they really gel together." Coleby called Vance and Roxy's relationship "spicy", and said they were very affectionate with one another. He thought the audience would be able to tell that it is very fun and that the pair have "a deep connection". Coleby confirmed that Vance knows how Terese and Roxy are related, and that Vance has "a bit of a chip on his shoulder" about Terese, as he thinks she is living a lie. He later told the Radio Times' Jonathon Hughes that Vance sees a lot of the old Terese in Roxy, which is one of the reasons he fell for her. He also told Hughes that Vance loves Roxy, but he will never not love Terese and his presence makes her question her life choices.

Leo later discovers that Vance is actually his business partner and that he and Roxy are trying to sell a stolen race horse. Terese eventually exposes Vance's scheme to sell the horse to Pierce Greyson (Tim Robards), as well as her past relationship with him. Vance also steals from the bar, leaving Paul to tell Roxy that he has robbed her and left her. Roxy is "hurting deeply" after the break up with Vance, and she is also angry that he and Terese kept their past relationship a secret. She decides to get revenge on Terese by kissing Paul, which Anderson put down to her being "confused and hurt." Continuing with Roxy's reasoning, Anderson stated "Roxy believes that if she can't be happy in love then no one can. But mostly, she does it to protect her Auntie T – she hears that Paul likes younger women, and is testing to see if Paul is actually faithful to Terese. She thinks all men are love rats!" Paul, who has no interest in her, pushes Roxy away and she declares that she is leaving town. As Paul and Terese try to stop her, Paul is attacked by an unseen assailant and Roxy finds him unconscious by the lake. Anderson told Sarah Ellis of Inside Soap that Roxy "freaks out" and feels immense guilt for what she did. Seeing Paul seriously injured "rips her to pieces" and she is shaken by the incident. It soon emerges that Vance attacked Paul, but Roxy does not want to betray him and initially pins the blame on neighbour Gary Canning (Damien Richardson). She eventually calls the police on Vance and then tries to keep "a low profile".

Paul's granddaughter Harlow Robinson (Donovan) brands Roxy immature and points out that she has not apologised to Gary. When Roxy does finally apologise, Gary does not accept it. Buchanan then briefly reprised her role as Gemma, who returns to tell Roxy that she is not "a bad person". Roxy apologises to Gary again, but is more sincere and he accepts. Roxy moves back home with Terese and Paul, but there is tension between her and Harlow. The growing animosity between Roxy and Harlow is soon noticed by Terese, who sends them to pick up her wedding dress to stop them arguing. However, they struggle to stay civil and Harlow is "frustrated" when Roxy reverses their car into a bin. Back home, Harlow is horrified when Roxy decides to try on the dress, and she tells Terese, who is not too worried. The pair get into a big fight when Roxy confronts Harlow for "dobbing her in" and they throw food at one another, until they are interrupted by the arrival of Harlow's grandmother, Gail Robinson (Fiona Corke).

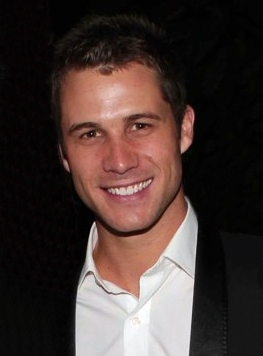
Roxy establishes a casual relationship with neighbour Mark Brennan, played by Scott McGregor (pictured).

=== Relationship with Mark Brennan ===
In August 2019, Roxy became a "surprise" love interest for Mark Brennan (Scott McGregor). The pair initially clash after Roxy accuses Mark of partying instead of investigating the con-artist who stole from Leo and put their business in jeopardy. She throws a drink over him, but later comes to his home to apologise and they have a one-night stand. The scenes showing how their "hook-up" happened were shown in a flashback sequence. Mark tries to keep their fling a secret, but Roxy later seduces him, beginning a casual relationship between the two. In an interview with Inside Soap's Alice Penwill, Anderson revealed that Roxy develops feelings for Mark, saying "Roxy has her heart in the right place, and is pretty blinded by love. I think Mark does care for Roxy and sees a side to her that not many get to see – plus they make each other smile, and that's all that matters!" Roxy eventually outs her relationship with Mark to their family and friends when she drunkenly kisses him at a party. Anderson explained that Roxy cannot control her happiness upon seeing Mark and launches herself at him "like a ball of love", but Mark, who is on duty, is embarrassed and angry. Anderson said that in the moment, Roxy cannot fathom the mistake she has made.

Anderson admitted that it could ruin any chance of a long-term relationship between the couple, telling Penwill: "Roxy has been keeping it chill. But deep down she really cares for Mark, and wishes he wanted to be with her seriously." The relationship comes to an end when it "turns toxic." As the pair go on dates, Roxy tones down her personality and clothing in an attempt to strengthen her connection with Mark, who she feels is not taking their relationship seriously. During a wine tasting event, Mark appears to grow "irritated" by Roxy's act and ends up insulting her. His sister Chloe Brennan (April Rose Pengilly) later calls out his "cruel behaviour". After Mark tells Roxy that he could never be in a serious relationship with her, Roxy ends their romance following advice from Harlow and Sheila. While talking about the audience reaction to her character, Anderson said the storyline with Mark had allowed her to show Roxy's vulnerable and softer sides, which the audience "loved".

=== Donor dilemma and friendship with Shane Rebecchi ===
Towards the end of 2019, David Tanaka (Takaya Honda) is involved in a hit-and-run accident, resulting in him needing a kidney transplant. Roxy is brought into the storyline when she learns that she is a donor match, but keeps the information to herself. Anderson said Roxy is "pretty reluctant" to donate a kidney to David, as someone directly related to her, like her parents, might need one in the future and she would not be able to help. Anderson stressed that Roxy loves David and his family, but he is not a blood relative. Pointing out other issues that could affect Roxy, Anderson continued "It's something that's hard and that she's considering, but if you're 21 and younger, donating a kidney is really dangerous for you as well. You're more likely to have a lot of heart problems in the future and a shorter life span. So it's quite nerve-wracking and scary, and of course she wants to help David, but she's got a lot on her mind." When David's half-brother flees the hospital after agreeing to donate his kidney, Roxy is forced into considering her decision not to donate. Anderson told Jess Lee of Digital Spy that Roxy is "utterly terrified", but she does want to help David and comes close to doing so. Anderson was grateful for the chance to portray the story from the view of someone who is not so sure about donating, adding "When I first heard about it, I was like, 'Oh, I would definitely be a donor'. But once researching the story and really digging into it, I'm so lucky and proud to be able to tell this story."

David's life is saved by the donation from his half-brother, but the truth about Roxy being a match comes out when he checks his medical records. Anderson said that, as expected, Roxy's family are not happy with her, and Paul is angry that she had the chance to save his son's life. Meanwhile, David is "a little bit more easy" and Anderson thought it was because he is a doctor and has a more understanding persona, so he is able to see things from her perspective. She also pointed out that Roxy had broken her family's trust by lying and keeping it a secret, so it would take time for them to forgive her. Anderson later told Inside Soap's Alice Penwill that the atmosphere at home was "not great at all." She also told her that Roxy feels that she has lost Paul and disappointed Terese and Harlow, who has been like a sister to her.

Writers formed a friendship between Roxy and her co-worker Shane Rebecchi (Nicholas Coghlan), after she confides in him about being a potential kidney donor for David. The pair develop "a close bond". When asked if Roxy might lead Shane astray, Anderson stated "I mean, Roxy does get a little bit excited and do some crazy things! And because Shane has fun with her, there's a big chance they'll get up to mischief." Anderson enjoyed acting with Coghlan on the storyline, as she found it easy to work with him. She thought they had a similar bond to their characters. She later called the pair "a bit of an odd match", and explained that Shane is supportive of Roxy and allows her to be who she is, while he is not afraid to be himself around her. Sheila notices the bond between them and attempts to keep them apart at work, but they end up working a shift together, during which Roxy kisses Shane. Shane pulls away and immediately leaves, but later comes to Roxy and tells her he wants to tell his wife, Dipi Rebecchi (Sharon Johal) what happened. Knowing that she will be branded "a home-wrecker", Roxy asks him to keep quiet. Anderson told Penwill's colleague Sarah Ellis that Roxy is hurt by Shane decision to confess all to Dipi. She continued "The last thing she wants is to upset anyone. As long as Shane's happy, though, that's all that Roxy cares about." Dipi later notices Roxy is on a downward spiral and invites her to spend the day with her, which leads to Roxy telling her about the kiss.

Roxy is later brought into Shane's drug addiction storyline, after she finds a bag of pills in the men's bathroom at The Waterhole. Roxy demands that Shane gets clean or she will tell Dipi, so Shane decides to go cold turkey in a hotel room. Coghlan stated that Shane, like most addicts, bargains with Roxy in order to keep quiet. He called it "a complicated exchange" and said Shane is easily able to convince her, as she trusts him. He also said "Shane actually abuses their relationship and manipulates her quite seriously – and it's going to get worse." Coghlan told Johnathon Hughes of the Radio Times that their friendship dynamic has been reversed and now Shane is the "wrongdoer", while Roxy is the adult and he is the child. Coghlan thought the scenes were "a nice, interesting progression of the relationship" and allowed further exploration of Shane and Roxy's characters, as they share "deep and meaningful conversations." He also told Hughes that as Shane tries to stop Roxy from exposing his secret, he becomes "fairly brutal towards Roxy and incredibly cruel".

=== Marriage to Kyle Canning ===
During the serial's 35th anniversary episodes, producers established a romance between Roxy and Kyle Canning (Chris Milligan). The pair join other Ramsay Street residents on an island trip for Elly Conway's (Jodi Anasta) birthday. They are seen flirting with each other and engaging in "saucy banter", which the others gossip about. They eventually give into their chemistry and have sex, but declare "what happens on the island, stays on the island." A long-term relationship between the pair is put on hold following the death of Kyle's father Gary Canning (Damien Richardson) on the island. Kyle and Roxy eventually go on a disastrous date, leading Roxy to decide that she and Kyle need to keep their romance casual. Kyle also maintains that he is not ready for a relationship, but soon begins dating guest character Jessica Quince (Lynn Gilmartin) after meeting her at a grief counselling group. Roxy is "riled" up and broken hearted by the development and briefly leaves Erinsborough. The show's executive producer Jason Herbison said the crew loved the characters as a couple, adding "There is a great chemistry there. However, they are at very different stages of their lives."

"I hope that they have a happy ending, I really do, because I love them together. And when Roxy first arrived, I don't think anyone expected that Kyle would be the one for her. But they work together so well. Neither of them has been lucky in love and it's a tough world. So I hope their marriage lasts and they have a beautiful relationship."

— Anderson on her hopes for Kyle and Roxy's future.

Roxy and Kyle continue to face obstacles as they attempt to start a serious relationship when Sheila voices her disapproval of them dating. Roxy is "discouraged and offended" by the news, but decides to tell Kyle that she wants to give their romance a go. Herbison told Hughes that Sheila's objection is to do with the timing of the relationship and "where they find themselves right now, despite the fact that she likes Roxy. Going forward, we see the potential for lots of fun in that relationship, but also some conflict..." Roxy later shares "a spontaneous kiss" with Levi Canning (Richie Morris), unaware that he is Kyle's cousin, but they decide to stay friends. Kyle is jealous when he finds out about the kiss and feels betrayed by them. Eventually Kyle and Roxy agree to be an exclusive couple despite Sheila's misgivings. Milligan believed that Kyle would pick Roxy if Sheila remained against the relationship, as that is what is making him happy. He said Roxy reminded him of Kyle's former girlfriend Jade Mitchell (Gemma Pranita) due to their "fiery" personalities. He continued, "Roxy is the best fit for him right now, and she is a lot different from his past relationships."

Anderson thought Roxy and Kyle were a good match, and she was hopeful that their relationship would last. She said I think they bring out some nice qualities in each other – Roxy brings out the fun side of Kyle, but they can also be quite sensitive with each other. The couple's relationship is tested by Kyle testicular cancer diagnosis in late 2021. Kyle comes to rely on Roxy, but she is "anxious about the situation" and struggles to be reassuring. However, she does encourage him to reveal his diagnosis to his family and friends, and is surprised when Kyle reveals that he has made a deposit at a sperm bank. Of how this might affect the couple's plans for a family, Anderson stated "Roxy is focussing on just enjoying the moments with Kyle after his cancer diagnosis. Obviously she wants kids and it's something that she has to worry about in the future. Deep down she does know that – and it's on her mind – but she'll face it as Roxy always does with that impulsiveness to face it when it comes and with the IVF options." Roxy later proposes and Kyle accepts. Anderson admitted that she was shocked that Roxy was going to be a married woman, but she felt that Roxy was someone who had always dreamt of getting married, she just did not think it would happen this quickly.

In the build up to the wedding, the Kyle and Roxy suffer several setbacks. Roxy's mother comes to Erinsborough and makes it clear that she thinks Roxy is rushing into marriage. Anderson called Gemma "a protective mother bear", as she knows her daughter wants children, which could be a problem for the couple. Gemma also points out that the couple have not lived together before, which Anderson said was "a fair point!" Kyle also hires "troublemaker" Mick Allsop (Joel Creasey) as their wedding planner, but Roxy and Mick get along well and Anderson thought they would be good friends under different circumstances. However, Mick has done "a terrible job" with the arrangements, forcing the couple's family and friends to band together to decorate the venue. Anderson told Penwill (Inside Soap): "Roxy wants to get married because she loves Kyle, and she wants everything to be breezy – but Mick's actions throw things up in the air." Anderson revealed that Roxy's dress was made for her by the show's costume department. She called it beautiful and said it had "a Roxy flair to it". The wedding goes ahead and Gemma gives Roxy away. Anderson told Rachel Lucas of whattowatch.com that the scenes were "a pleasure to shoot". She hoped the pair would move into their own house, which would be filled with children and dogs, and become the new Karl (Alan Fletcher) and Susan Kennedy (Jackie Woodburne), but "a lot spicier..."

The couple's wedding reception at the Flamingo Bar is marred by a storm, which sees lightning strike a nearby telegraph pole bringing it down on the venue. Of her reaction to the storyline, Anderson told Kilkelly and Asyia Iftikhar of Digital Spy: "With everything that Roxy and Kyle have been through, it was pretty rough to hear that their wedding wasn't going to go smoothly!" But she felt that it was in keeping with the show's traditions and the producers had to "mix it up". She said the audience could expect a lot of drama, especially as several characters' lives are in danger. Anderson enjoyed filming the stunt, which involved the use of large fans, and joked that Milligan had to hold onto her to stop her getting blown off her feet. Writers used the story to kill-off Leo's partner Britney Barnes (Montana Cox) following the destruction of the bar.

In their final storyline, Roxy undergoes IVF treatment in bid to conceive the couple's first child. She is "hugely optimistic" that she is pregnant and arranges a gathering for her friends to witness her pregnancy test result, which Kyle soon cancels out of concern for her. The test is negative, and they soon learn that an accident at the IVF clinic has destroyed all of Kyle's sperm, leaving them both "devastated". Anderson was grateful for the chance to portray a couple who were struggling to conceive, saying "it was important to perform that and do justice for all the women, men and couples who go through it." She thought it was portrayed well and said that she and Milligan had some "tough days" during filming. Shortly after, Roxy and Kyle decide to move to Darwin for a fresh start, after receiving a house offer from Roxy's parents. But when Roxy "lets rip" at Kyle without a reason, Gemma suggests that she might be pregnant after all, so she takes another pregnancy test, which is positive. Roxy then shares the news with Kyle and they begin preparing for their new life in Darwin. Anderson was delighted that a pregnancy was scripted for Roxy and Kyle before their departure, as she felt that they were very deserving of it. She was aware that there had to be a bit of tension in the lead up to the revelation, and she admitted that she would have been "devastated" if they did not leave expecting a baby.

=== Feud with Amy Greenwood ===
Following Amy Greenwood's (Jacinta Stapleton) reintroduction in May 2021, writers established a work feud between her and Roxy as they both want to run the Flamingo Bar. Amy is given the manager's job on a trial basis and the pair clash numerous times. When asked why her character wants the manager's position, Anderson told Ellis that Roxy knows she has made some mistakes in the past and people do not have much faith in her, so she wants to prove herself. Of Roxy's managerial style, Anderson stated: "I'd actually love to have a boss like Roxy, she has lots of ideas and makes everything fun. But she can be quite stern when she wants to." When Amy becomes aware of Roxy's intentions, she tries to get her fired. Anderson told Ellis that Roxy is initially unaware, but once she realises what Amy is up to, she is "furious". Roxy does not think about whether she is being a bad employee, she just wants Amy's job. Anderson thought that Roxy and Amy would be good friends if the circumstances were different and they had met somewhere like the pub. She stated that the characters were very similar, and while Roxy wants to be like Amy and almost looks up to her, she is somewhat jealous of her. Anderson also thought that Amy is "a little bit intimidated by Roxy", but they had the "potential to make peace, because they are one and the same."

Anderson was excited to work with Stapleton, as they have similar personalities outside of the show and she was ready to work with someone on her level. She admitted to being sceptical about how the fight scenes would be portrayed, as she did not want to do "the catty, girl-fight thing", so she and Stapleton made them more playful and fun. She later explained that they did not want to portray "an angry catfight situation", as it was not realistic and it does not show women "in the right light." Speaking to Kilkelly of Digital Spy, Anderson stated "When we changed some things, we pushed it with passion. We saw jealousy, but when Roxy was angry with Amy, it was because she could see how well Amy was doing and she wanted to be like her. Roxy was still really proud of Amy at the same time. The writers, producers and directors were so willing to let us play and experiment with that. That's just because they trust us, which is good!" Anderson also said that it was important that they showed women are not enemies in workplace environments, but are supportive of each other and their ideas instead. She also pointed out that being bossy can be seen as a bad thing for women, but it was "good to embrace" goals and the need to take charge. Amy and Roxy have to work together to organise the Erinsborough Longest Workout competition. Amy knows that the event needs to be a success if she wants the permanent manager's position.

After Roxy and Amy are caught "scrapping" by Terese, she informs them that one of them will have to leave the Flamingo Bar. Anderson said the fight had been building up for "a while" due to various contributing factors, explaining "Roxy has been noting down everything that Amy's done wrong over the past few weeks, so she has a list all ready to hand in to Paul and Terese! She believes she could do a better job as manager, so she's being quite conniving." Anderson also said that during the fight, Roxy tries to get under Amy's skin. They are both being "childish" and then just snap at each other, which Terese witnesses. Roxy and Amy continue to insult one another and during another fight, a fire accidentally breaks out some among equipment they are organising for the contest. Anderson told Ellis "They're both being narky with each other when that happens – there are still huge issues arising between the two of them, and that's when the fire starts. At this point, Roxy will use anything she can to bring down Amy!" To their surprise, Terese gives them both one last chance and makes them work together to make the contest a success. Anderson hoped viewers would enjoy the Longest Workout scenes, as she thought they were really funny. The scenes also show Roxy and Amy finally working well together, which she said was "nice to see".

=== Departure and returns ===
On 14 March 2022, Daniel Kilkelly of Digital Spy confirmed that Anderson and Milligan would be leaving the show together in the coming weeks. Their departures had been planned and scripted before it was announced Neighbours would be ending later that year. Kyle and Roxy made their exits during the episode broadcast on 12 April 2022 in the UK and on 5 May 2022 in Australia. The pair decide to relocate to Darwin after learning Roxy is pregnant. They attend a farewell party hosted by their family and friends, where they announce they are expecting a baby. Anderson told Kilkelly that she had decided to leave Neighbours after completing her three year contract. She praised the show for being the best acting school and explained that she had learned so much during her time there, that she needed to pursue new challenges and the timing worked out well for her. She found it hard to leave, as she loved her character, but said that Roxy would "always be with me". Reflecting on her Neighbours experience and exit, Anderson stated "Being in Neighbours was a goal that I've had my whole life – and I've done it! The show has taught me everything I know, but more important than the career it has given me is the family I've gained. I've made friends I hope to have for the rest of my life, and met so many beautiful people along the way."

Anderson was pleased with her character's exit story, as she felt that Roxy had come to Erinsborough to "better herself" and she had achieved that. With her being pregnant and her parents living in Darwin, it was "the perfect time" for her to leave and spend time with them. Anderson was grateful to the producers for allowing Roxy and Kyle to leave together and not have them split up at the end after everything they had been through. She was also glad they got their happy ending, saying "Quite often, you don't see couples just being happy and positive. But Roxy and Kyle are, and I'll always be thankful that they did that for our characters. I'm sure the fans will be, too." When asked how she envisioned Roxy's life playing out off-screen, Anderson said Roxy would "have a ball" up in Darwin. She thought Roxy and Kyle's child would be a boy, as she could see them running around after him, and that the couple would definitely want to make more babies in the future. Anderson later made a cameo appearance as Roxy to help facilitate Ned's exit from the serial on 9 May in the UK and 8 June in Australia.

Anderson and Milligan returned for the show's final episodes in July following its cancellation. On 14 January 2025, it was announced that Anderson had again reprised the role. Roxy returned again in February and March 2025, alongside her relative Shane Ramsay (Peter O'Brien). In November 2025, Digital Spy confirmed that Roxy would return again in December 2025 for the show's final episodes.

== Reception ==
A critic for the Birmingham Mail observed that Roxy's arrival "stirs things up" in Terese's household. While Simon Timblick of whattowatch.com said she "certainly makes a memorable first impression". A writer for Inside Soap called Roxy a "bad girl", and quipped "Roxy's been in no end of trouble since she turned up in Neighbours, after being dumped by boyfriend Vance and clashing with her Auntie Terese." Digital Spy's Daniel Kilkelly had a similar reaction, writing "Terese's troublesome niece has shaken up Ramsay Street with her wild behaviour over the past two weeks".

A few weeks after Roxy's introduction, Anderson stated that she had received messages from people who loved Roxy, and some "really, really good comments so far." An Evening Express critic observed that Roxy was "fuming" about Paul and Terese's engagement, and branded her attempt to seduce Paul "crude". A reporter for the Evening Chronicle noted that "Roxy feels her nose put out of joint" by Harlow's arrival. They also dubbed her a "troublemaker". After Roxy went topless to get revenge on Terese, a writer for the South Wales Echo commented "There's a touch of the Lady Godivas about Roxy this week."

In December 2019, Bridget McManus of The Sydney Morning Herald praised Anderson's performance as she made "the most of a tearful cafe scene, as her character, waitress Roxy, confesses an awful secret to her understanding boss." Claire Crick of whattowatch.com thought Roxy and Mark were an unexpected couple and "a shock pairing", especially as he is "straight-laced" and she was a "wild child". A TV Soap writer later branded the character a "man-magnet". Following her kiss with Shane, a contributor to 10 Play stated "Bad Gal Roxy did a bad, bad thang."

Radio Times writer Joe Julians pointed out "Roxy has calmed somewhat since her introduction and has gone on to become a fan-favourite." Executive producer Jason Herbison also stated "Roxy has developed into a classic Neighbours character and we love her." In December 2021, the Daily Mirror's Susan Knox reported that Roxy had placed fifth in a poll to find the top ten favourite Neighbours characters of all time run by Australian fansite Back to the Bay. The following year, Sheena McGinley of the Irish Independent included Roxy in her list of 12 "Iconic Neighbours characters", noting that it might come as a surprise to some readers.
