= Zima Anderson =

Australian actress (born 1998)

- Born: 22 February 1998 (age 28)
- Occupations: Actress; painter
- Years active: 2019–
- Television: Neighbours; SAS Australia: Who Dares Wins

Zima Anderson (born 22 February 1998) is an Australian actress. She grew up in Burnie, Tasmania, on a farm and later moved to Melbourne. In 2019, she had a guest role in Ms Fisher's Modern Murder Mysteries, and that same year she joined the cast of the soap opera Neighbours as Roxy Willis. Anderson remained in the role until she left in 2022 to explore other acting opportunities. She made returns in the role later in 2022 and in 2025. In 2023, she was a recruit for the fourth season of SAS Australia: Who Dares Wins; however, she was medically withdrawn after having an injury on set. Anderson is also a painter.

== Early life ==
Anderson was born on 22 February 1998. She grew up in Burnie, Tasmania, on a farm with her pet and family. Whilst she was growing up, Anderson's mother had schizophrenia and she was subsequently taken into foster care at a "young age". Anderson said that she struggled to talk about the situation to her friends as "a lot of people don't understand mental illness. Then judgment comes along with it". Anderson believed that her difficult childhood made her become empathetic and understanding. Anderson attended Burnie High School, and she took part in the school's drama production of What's new Pussycat? in 2013. She later moved to Melbourne.

== Career ==
Anderson had a guest stint as Gidget Mitchell in a February 2019 episode of the Australian drama television series Ms Fisher's Modern Murder Mysteries. On 14 April 2019, it was announced that Anderson had joined the cast of the Australian soap opera Neighbours as Roxy Willis. Neighbours was Anderson's first speaking role. She made her debut in the episode airing on 29 April of that year. Anderson felt fortunate with her role, explaining, "I've already found myself in a wide range of crazy situations from virtually the first scene which has been so much fun and really challenged me, I'm constantly learning". Anderson had wanted to be on the soap since she was 13-years-old. The actress found her first day on set her "best experience to date" and added, "I was nervous but more excited and my first scene I had to jump up on the bar and pour tequila in my belly button which explains itself! Everyone on set was so welcoming and nice and it was just better than I ever imagined". She praised the cast and crew for being "happy, helpful and just so great" and for her colleagues for giving her advice and mentoring, particularly Stefan Dennis' tip to "never be afraid to look silly". Roxy's storylines on the soap included a fling with Mark Brennan (Scott McGregor), a friendship and fling with Shane Rebecchi (Nicholas Coghlan), finding out she is a donor match for David Tanaka (Takaya Honda), a feud with Amy Greenwood (Jacinta Stapleton), marrying Kyle Canning (Chris Milligan), and discovering that she is pregnant with his child after struggling to conceive. Anderson also played the part in the soap's late night special episodes Endgame, which she enjoyed. She also described the soap as the "best classroom for young actors".

Anderson enjoyed Roxy's style and the way she wants people to have fun, though the actress believed that she was different from Roxy as she hates making trouble. Anderson noted that the reaction to her character changed over time and that people would go up to her and talk to her about "how great it is to see such a confident character have a vulnerable side and still be confident when she can do". For Roxy and Kyle's wedding, the costume team of the soap made a wedding dress for Anderson from scratch. Anderson later left the role and her exit aired on 12 April 2022, alongside Milligan. Their departures had been announced earlier that month. Anderson revealed that she had left as she had promised herself that she would "challenge" herself after she spent three years on the soap. She explained:

"You get so comfortable. Neighbours is the best school you could ever go to for acting. You never get an experience like that anywhere. I learned so much, I laughed so much and I'd grown so much as a human, so I felt that I needed to challenge myself in another direction. I felt like it worked out as perfect timing. It was so hard to leave a place like that, because Neighbours is so incredible and fantastic. I love Roxy and she'll always be with me, but it was a choice to go and learn somewhere else, because I'd learned so much already."

The actress found her departure emotional, explaining, "it was a really weird sensation to be completing a massive life goal. I had gained such a family there. Everyone I met along the way has been so influential and important in my life". Through her time on the soap, Anderson felt that she had become more confident in herself as an actress. Anderson's departure aired months before Neighbours' 2022 finale after the soap was cancelled earlier that year; Anderson explained that she wanted to stay until the end but her contract ended a few months before and it felt right for her to leave. However, she added that she would be happy to return to the soap for the finale and said that she would find it fun to wear a baby bump. Anderson later made two brief returns later in 2022, including for the soap's final episodes broadcast in July of that year. In January 2025, it was announced that Anderson would reprise the role for Neighbours' 40th Anniversary. Her return aired in the episode originally released on 20 February of that year. In November 2025, it was announced that Anderson would return as Roxy for the soap's final episodes the following month.

In March 2023, it was announced that Anderson would be a recruit for the fourth season of SAS Australia: Who Dares Wins. Anderson attributed her upbringing to helping her on the show, explaining, "When you're a foster child, you're the only one who's on your side. You have to be independent, so I felt comfortable being a nobody [on the show]". Whilst on the show, Anderson was transported to hospital after she slipped and fell down eight metres onto a concrete slab during a task where she had to jump into the ocean from a high platform in the episode airing on 24 October 2023. Anderson fractured her wrist and right elbow and ended up withdrawing from the show on medical grounds. Anderson spoke about her experience on Instagram, writing, "I could not be more grateful to have heard the stories of and been bossed around by these legends. Honestly could not thank you all more for this experience, all your words and encouragement". She also was grateful that she had not broken her spine. Reflecting on the incident in 2024, Anderson said, "It was one of the things I thought I got a message to not do it and I didn't follow my intuition. I was meant to land in the water in the ocean. If I had landed in the water, I would have been paraplegic or dead easily. It took me four days to walk again, the shock in my body. I was in some army hospital and they kept doing scans and stuff because it didn't make sense. I thought I broke my spine or broke my legs and I remember every single aspect and every single moment, and in all honesty, I just accepted I was going to die".

Anderson is also a painter and had her first exhibition in Melbourne after leaving Neighbours in 2022. She has also said that she plans to direct in the future. She has described acting as being "everything" to her, explaining, "I am just a creative person, but acting sits at the forefront of mind constantly".

== Personal life ==
Anderson revealed in 2019 that she has a nephew. Whilst working on Neighbours, Anderson said that she developed a "beautiful friendship" with her colleague Jemma Donovan, who played Harlow Robinson, and that Anderson tried to make her feel welcome on the soap when she started. The pair became close friends. In 2023, Anderson revealed that she had a partner called Ricky and that the pair were planning to marry and have children, with Anderson saying that she was "dying" to be a mother. Anderson described her partner as being "very much a joker" and attributed him to helping her take stuff less seriously. That same year, Anderson explained that her mother goes through "good" and "bad" spells. In late 2020, Anderson said that she was living by herself in Melbourne. She is a fan of mixed martial arts. She is also a Tarot card reader.

== Filmography ==
Year	Title	Role	Notes	Ref.
2019	Ms Fisher's Modern Murder Mysteries	Gidget Mitchell	1 episode ("Dead Beat")	
2019–22, 2025	Neighbours	Roxy Willis	Regular role	
2023	SAS Australia: Who Dares Wins	Herself	Season 4 recruit	
