= Great White (2021 film) =

Australian horror film

- Theatrical release poster
- Directed by: Martin Wilson
- Written by: Michael Boughen
- Produced by: Neal Kingston; Michael Robertson
- Starring: Katrina Bowden; Aaron Jakubenko; Tim Kano; Te Kohe Tuhaka; Kimie Tsukakoshi
- Cinematography: Tony O'Loughlan
- Music by: Tim Count
- Production companies: Thrills & Spills; Piccadilly Pictures; Filmology Finance
- Release date: 16 July 2021 (United States)
- Running time: 91 minutes
- Country: Australia
- Language: English
- Box office: $635,058

Great White is a 2021 Australian survival horror film directed by Martin Wilson, written by Michael Boughen and produced by Neal Kingston and Michael Robertson with executive producers Jack Christian and Christopher Figg. The film stars Katrina Bowden, Aaron Jakubenko, Tim Kano, Te Kohe Tuhaka and Kimie Tsukakoshi. In the film, two great white sharks circle five passengers aboard a stranded seaplane miles from shore.

The film was released in the United States on 16 July 2021, via theatres and video on demand.

== Plot ==
A pair of seaplane lovers and operators, Kaz Fellows and her boyfriend, Charlie Brody, along with their passengers, Joji Minase, his wife, Michelle and cook Benny, take a flight to picturesque Hell's Reef. Upon landing they encounter a corpse that has washed up after a suspected shark attack. They report it to the coast guard but find the man's phone has a picture of his girlfriend.

Benny and Charlie coax the others into tracking the yacht the couple were on in case she survived. Joji believes it hopeless and objects to being put at risk. Kaz flies off with all five searching for the missing damaged yacht. They find the yacht capsized and Benny dives in to investigate the wreck in case the girl is trapped inside. He finds her partially consumed corpse and returns to the seaplane whereupon the great white shark reappears and attacks one of the floats of the seaplane. The seaplane begins to sink so all five depart for the plane's life raft.

Drifting in the current, Charlie tries to navigate using the life raft's meager compass and oars. Michelle and Joji take a shift rowing the raft, but Michelle nods off and loses one of the oars. Kaz dives into the water and retrieves the oar. Benny and Joji get into a scuffle due to the latter's jealousy and Joji pushes Benny, who falls in water and is attacked and killed by the great white. The shark then attacks the raft, flipping everyone into the water. Joji is killed swimming back to the raft.

With no provisions and only one oar, Michelle, Kaz and Charlie try to row with their hands. The shark returns, but Charlie, to his horror, realizes that there is now more than just one shark. Kaz is knocked into the water, but manages to get back to the raft unhurt. The next day, Michelle spots land but the raft has started to deflate. Realizing that they will surely sink and be at the mercy of both sharks, Charlie and Kaz decide to try to distract the sharks in order for Michelle to make it to land.

Kaz, who turned out to be pregnant with Charlie's child, manages to hit one of the sharks with a flare and Charlie pierces its eye and brain with his knife, killing it. Meanwhile, Michelle manages to get onto a rusted piece of debris from an old shipwreck. Charlie reloads the second flare and then attempts to take out the remaining shark. While embracing Charlie, Kaz spots the oncoming shark. Charlie turns to shoot, but misses with his flare and is attacked and killed by the shark. Kaz manages to escape to Michelle. The great white shark attacks, knocking both women into the water. Kaz tries to distract the shark once more while Michelle swims for the shore.

Kaz hides in the damaged shipwreck as the shark attacks and it becomes ensnared in some metal. Kaz, unable to reach her breathing equipment, drifts into unconsciousness and almost drowns. But before she succumbs, Michelle returns and manages to revive Kaz with mouth to mouth. Kaz springs into action and manages to dislodge some of the structure impaling the shark and killing it. Both Kaz and Michelle swim to the shore and reflect on their escape.

== Cast ==
- Katrina Bowden as Kaz Fellows, an American nurse, who works alongside her boyfriend, Charlie in his charter plane business. She is pregnant with his child at the start of the film.
- Aaron Jakubenko as Charlie Brody, a former marine biologist, who currently runs a charter plane business.
- Tim Kano as Joji "Joe" Minase, a Japanese businessman, who is afraid of water.
- Kimie Tsukakoshi as Michelle Minase, Joe's wife, who hired Charlie's charter plane to sprinkle her grandfather's ashes.
- Te Kohe Tuhaka as Benny, the on-site cook and friend of Charlie and Kaz.
- Jason Wilder as Luke, vlogger and husband of Tracy.
- Tatjana Marjanovic as Tracy, wife of Luke.

== Release ==
Great White was released theatrically in Spain on 7 May 2021, and in the United Arab Emirates on 13 May 2021. It was released in theatres and on video on demand and digital platforms in the United States on 16 July 2021.

== Reception ==
=== Box office ===
Great White grossed $348,566 in Spain and $168,087 in the United Arab Emirates, bringing its total worldwide gross to $516,653.

=== Critical response ===
On Rotten Tomatoes, the film has an approval rating of 43% based on 40 reviews, with an average rating of 4.6/10. The site's consensus reads, "It's far from the most toothless shark thriller, but Great White lacks the killer storytelling instinct necessary to stay afloat". Cath Clarke, writing for The Guardian, gave the film a score of two out of five stars. Clarke complimented the "semi-decent CGI great white", but wrote that the film "shoehorns climate change in to a very familiar narrative", and that "You may find yourself nail-biting – out of boredom rather than fear."
