= Neighbours – The Celebration Tour =

2023 touring theatre production

- Company: Maple Tree Entertainment; Fremantle
- Genre: Television
- Show type: Conversational
- Date of premiere: 1 March 2023
- Final show: 16 April 2023
- Location: United Kingdom; Australia

Other information
- Executive producer: Mellissa Julians
- Director: Joe Julians
- Hosts: Leah Boleto; Jennifer Hansen
- Official website

Neighbours – The Celebration Tour was a 2023 touring theatre production about the Australian soap opera Neighbours. The tour was originally conceived as a one-off live event titled "Neighbours: Live in Conversation", to celebrate the show's thirty-fifth anniversary in 2020. It was later cancelled due to the COVID-19 pandemic. Following the cancellation of Neighbours, Maple Tree Entertainments and Fremantle planned a UK theatre tour, repackaged and retitled as "Neighbours: The Farewell Tour". It was expanded to become a multi-venue touring show for 2023. The series was later given a reprieve when Amazon Freevee partnered with Fremantle to co-produce future episodes of Neighbours. This meant the tour had to be rebranded again, this time as "'Neighbours: The Celebration Tour". The show was presented by Leah Boleto during its UK run.

The show's concept incorporates several Neighbours cast members being interviewed about the show by a host speaker. The cast share personal stories, perform musical numbers and act out a scene from Neighbours: The Finale. The cast also take part in an interactive question and answer session. Meet and greet sessions with fans were also held at each venue. The tour began on 1 March 2023 at Waterfront Hall in Belfast and concluded at the London Palladium on 23 March 2023. A one-off Australian tour date was held at Hamer Hall, Melbourne on 16 April 2023, with a different ensemble cast. There were seventeen shows in total. The tour featured the cast members Alan Fletcher, Jackie Woodburne, April Rose Pengilly, Ryan Moloney, Annie Jones and Stefan Dennis. Additional cast members appeared during the tour's sole Australian show.

The tour received positive reviews from critics with praise emphasised on its more emotional and surreal moments. The cast's frank discussions about Neighbours being cancelled were favoured. The shows were described as the "ultimate experience" for Neighbours fans. Boleto also received praise her presenting role and her interviews with cast members.

== Creation and background ==
On 19 December 2019, a special live event titled "Neighbours: Live in Conversation" was announced to celebrate the show's thirty-fifth anniversary. Fremantle Media partnered with Maple Tree Entertainment to bring the event, which was envisioned as a one-off event featuring present and former Neighbours cast members. The concept would have had cast answering audience questions and sharing their favourite memories from the show's history. In addition, it was planned that attendees would gain an insight into future storylines. It was scheduled to take place at the London Adelphi Theatre on Sunday 15 March 2020. Tickets went on sale on 20 December 2019 and the show sold out within twenty-four hours. Maple Tree Entertainment partnered with Goldups Lane to oversee the marketing and publicity of the show.

On 9 March 2020, it was announced that the show had been cancelled due to the COVID-19 pandemic and the travel restrictions that began to emerge. A publicist from Freemantle stated that the cast could not attend because of safety concerns. They added "whilst this is obviously very disappointing, the wellbeing of all our cast and crew is our utmost priority." A publicist from Neighbours: Live in Conversation released a statement via social media website Twitter. They confirmed the show had been postponed and would be rescheduled for a later date. The show was rescheduled for 20 October 2020 for the London Adelphi Theatre. As the pandemic worsened the show was postponed again until 2021. The show failed to materialise.

On 6 February 2022, Neighbours' British broadcaster Channel 5 announced it was not renewing the show's contract and would cease broadcasting in the UK. The show lost its main source of funding and faced permanent cancellation. On 3 March 2022, it was confirmed that Neighbours would end production because an alternative broadcasting partner had not been secured. The show's finale episode was broadcast in Australia on 28 July 2022. On 8 June 2022, Daniel Kilkelly from Digital Spy reported that Maple Tree Entertainments and Freemantle were planning a UK theatre tour. He noted that the original London show had been rescheduled and the tour was expected to be confirmed in the following days. On 9 June 2022, it was officially announced that the show had been repackaged and retitled "Neighbours: The Farewell Tour" because of the show's cancellation. It was expanded to become a multi-venue touring show for 2023. The shows would feature similar content to that which was planned for the Live in Conversation show. It was also revealed that the cast now had the opportunity to share untold stories and secrets with the audience. Those who purchased tickets for the original show at the Adelphi Theatre were given tickets to watch the new tour at the London Palladium. Dean Elliott, who works as a producer at Maple Tree Entertainment stated "When Neighbours: Live in Conversation sold out within 24 hours, we knew that the love for the show could see it tour the UK, and there is no better time to take to the road than to mark the end and to honour its rich and lengthy history."

The series was later given a reprieve when Amazon Freevee entered talks with Fremantle to co-produce future episodes of Neighbours. The show's return was announced on 17 November 2022. It was also revealed that cast members from its previous run would be returning. This cast fresh doubt over the tour's future. Though it was later confirmed that the tour would still go ahead as planned. The production team confirmed they were looking for a new tour name because of the show's return made the "Farewell Tour" title redundant. On 22 November 2022, it was announced that the tour had been rebranded for a third time. Given the show would return, the new name of "'Neighbours: The Celebration Tour" was chosen. In a post via the official Neighbours Twitter account, it was revealed the name was chosen because it "perfectly represents what it was always planned to be, a celebration of Neighbours past, present and future."

== Production ==
=== Casting ===
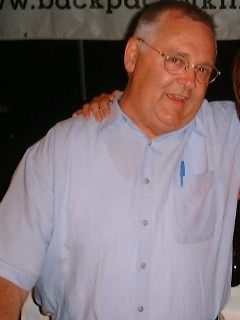
Ian Smith, who plays Harold Bishop in Neighbours appeared at the Australian show.

On 13 July 2022, the show's first casting announcements were made. It was revealed that Alan Fletcher and Jackie Woodburne who play the characters Karl Kennedy and Susan Kennedy respectively had signed up to appear. On 22 July 2022, April Rose Pengilly's casting was publicised, she plays Chloe Brennan in the series. On 29 July 2023, Ryan Moloney who plays Toadie Rebecchi, was announced as the fourth cast member. Jane Harris actress Annie Jones was announced on 19 August 2022. On 29 November 2022, Stefan Dennis who plays Paul Robinson was announced as the final cast member joining the UK tour. It was later revealed that the cast involved did not need any convincing because they were keen to meet with the show's fans.

The UK tour's strong ticket sales prompted organisers to create a one-off show in Melbourne, Australia. Taking place in the city Neighbours is filmed in, the accompanying promotional poster revealed that cast announcements were immanent. On 21 February 2023, the cast for the Melbourne show were revealed. Fletcher, Jones and Pengilly signed up to appear again. New cast signed to appear were Ian Smith (Harold Bishop), Anne Charleston (Madge Bishop), Tim Kano (Leo Tanaka) and Lucinda Cowden (Melanie Pearson).

=== Concept ===
In 2022, Joe Julians was hired as the show's director. Julians pitched the original idea to Dean Elliott from Maple Tree Entertainment and they ended up producing the tour. Julian's wife Mellissa works in theatre marketing and helped to develop the show, later becoming the show's executive producer. Julians began re-watching old episodes to prepare for the tour and give it the correct homage to its source material. He told Marcus Wratten from the i newspaper that "it's so much bigger than it was going to be. Demand is huge for this." Julian's was a lifelong viewer of Neighbours and he described directing the show as "wonderful, but surreal" and felt like he was writing fan-fiction.

Julians explained to William Quinn from The Quinntessential Review that show was developed from the original idea behind Neighbours Live in Conversation. When the show was cancelled, the production team realised one show would be inadequate and planned a full tour. Julians believed the biggest changes to the second planned incarnation were some "slightly retooled conversations". Changes took place again once the show was recommissioned by Amazon Freevee. Julians explained "the most notable difference" to the show was the planned ending which changed with the developments on the show.

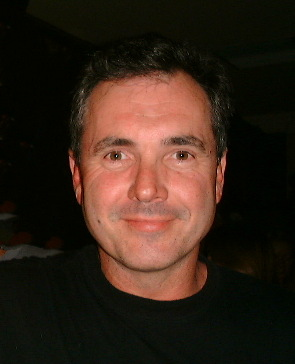
Alan Fletcher, who plays Karl Kennedy in Neighbours performed an original musical number titled "Susie K".

The show was designed to feature two hour long acts separated by an interval. Video packages featuring old Neighbours clips were created to introduce each actor onto the stage. Julians struggled to select sixty seconds of footage from countless episodes their characters appeared in. He decided to make the presentations "fun" and to show the characters evolve throughout their years on-screen. Other video montages were created for the shows but Julians was careful not to include too many. He believed it detracted from valuable time that cast members could be discussing the show on stage. Woodburne told Keith Bailie from Belfast Telegraph that "the show itself will be a lot of fun. It's a celebration of the show and our way of thanking the fans that saved it."

Leah Boleto was hired to host the shows. She revealed she had been a long-time fan and viewers of Neighbours. Boleto told Chris Mitchell from Australian Broadcasting Corporation that it was a celebration of fans coming together and celebrating the show. She added that the show meant different things to all viewers and the tour gave them a chance to acknowledge that. The show consists of segments featuring Boleto interviewing cast members separately. The cast reveal backstage information on filming various storylines throughout their tenure. In the second half the show's cast gather for a group interview segment. They discuss their reactions to the show's cancellation and later revival. In addition they take part in a question and answer session with the audience.

A musical number titled "Susie K" is performed by Fletcher and is an ode to the character of Susan. There is another musical number at the end of the show featuring the cast performing the show's theme tune. They encourage audience interactivity and get them singing along. In the final moments of the show, Woodburne begins to recite her character's monologue featured in the show's finale. The remaining cast members join Woodburne as they speak lines of dialogue from the original monologue. Australian journalist and news presenter Jennifer Hansen hosted the Australian show.

== Credits ==
=== UK cast ===
- Host - Leah Boleto
- Alan Fletcher
- Jackie Woodburne
- April Rose Pengilly
- Ryan Moloney
- Annie Jones
- Stefan Dennis

=== Australia cast ===
- Host - Jennifer Hansen
- Alan Fletcher
- Annie Jones
- April Rose Pengilly
- Ian Smith
- Anne Charleston
- Tim Kano
- Lucinda Cowden

=== Production team ===
- General manager - Dean Elliot
- Executive producer - Mellissa Julians
- Creative director - Joe Julians
- Company tour manager - Damian Sandys
- Production / sound - Chris Crowther
- Lighting designer - Darren Coopland
- Touring production team - Jon Varley, Craig Mitchell
- Technical supplier - Peter Cox
- Campaign manager - Mellissa Julians
- Content editor - Joe Julians
- Graphic designer - Alex Bradbury
- Research - Paul Sparks
- Additional creative - F8 Creates
- Production assistants - Helen Ashman, Charles Blyth, Cameron Potts, Emma Kurij
- Tour accountant - Suzanne Fuller
- Legal - Brais & Krais
- Merchandise manager - Josh Powell
- Marchandise assistants - Mark Powell, Nick Lobo

== Promotion and venues ==
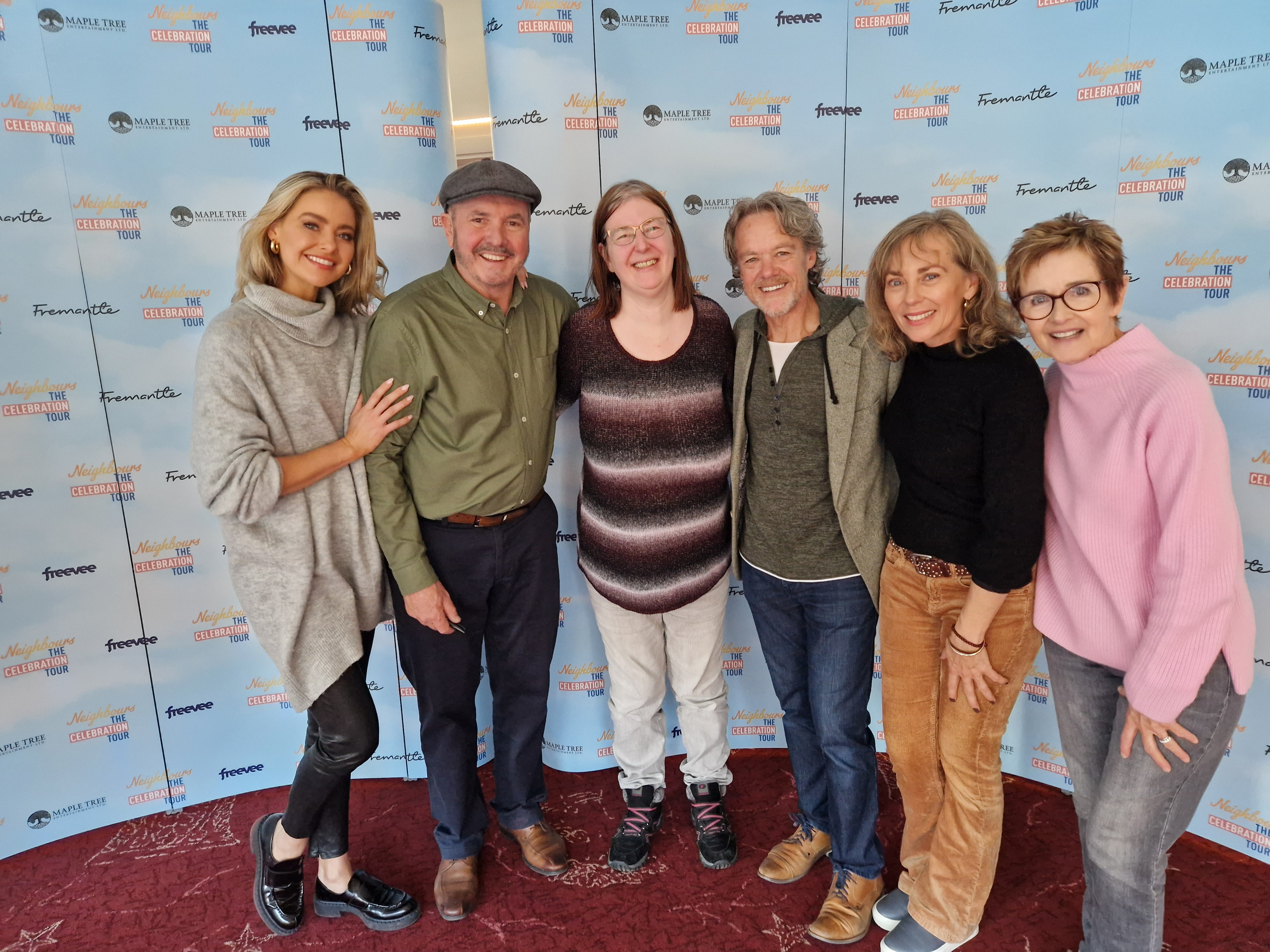
April Rose Pengilly, Alan Fletcher, a Neighbours fan, Stefan Dennis, Annie Jones and Jackie Woodburne at the Edinburgh show's meet and greet event.

The tour organisers partnered with Greatest Hits Radio to promote the shows. They offered listeners a chance to win free tickets to their nearest show and an exclusive video message from one of the touring cast members. The production also partnered with Hilton Worldwide, which became the official tour sponsor. The also partnered with Manchester Theatres to give away free tickets via a competition.

On 9 June 2022, the show's venues and tour dates were announced. Pre-sale tickets were made available on 15 June with general sale tickets being made available from 17 June. In addition to the main tour, the promoter planned meet-and-greet sessions with the show's cast at each venue. The tour became largely sold out in the UK. When the final version of the tour was announced, it was planned to tour eight venues. Additional dates and venues were added to meet demand with a total of fifteen UK shows.

The tour's Glasgow run was originally supposed to be held at the Glasgow Royal Concert Hall, but this was changed to the larger venue, the SEC Armadillo. The show was sold out at its Belfast, Cardiff, Southampton and Bath venues. The tour had three shows, including two nights back-to-back, at The Palladium in London. The final UK tour date was held at the venue and it was unique to the other show's as it featured a special announcement at the end. The show's cast revealed that the filming of Neighbours would officially resume from 17 April 2022 at Nunawading Studios in Melbourne. The cast travelled between venues via a tour bus. Prior to shows they carried out their meet and greet duties sometimes with up two 250 fans. Fletcher revealed some days were "torrid" but the fans enthusiasm helped them continue onwards. The tour's only Australian date took place at the Hamer Hall in Melbourne on 16 April 2023. The event featured exclusive news about the soap opera. Cowden announced her return to Neighbours and the cast confirmed that producers had secured filming rights to Pin Oak Court, the filming location of the show's fictional Ramsay Street.

Official Neighbours merchandise were sold at the venues. This included branded t-shirts, hoodies, hats, keyring and poster. It also included branded items from businesses featured in the show. These included a Harold's café mug, Lassiters hotel pen and Erinsborough High tote bag. Fletcher later revealed that Neighbours sold more merchandise than any other show held at The Palladium before it.

List of tour dates and venues:
Date	City	Country	Venue
Europe
1 March	Belfast	United Kingdom	Waterfront Hall
3 March	Manchester	United Kingdom	Bridgewater Hall
5 March	Newcastle	United Kingdom	O2 City Hall
6 March	Manchester	United Kingdom	Bridgewater Hall
8 March	Edinburgh	United Kingdom	Festival Theatre
10 March	Glasgow	United Kingdom	SEC Armadillo
12 March	Cardiff	United Kingdom	St David's Hall
13–14 March	London	United Kingdom	The Palladium
16 March	Birmingham	United Kingdom	Symphony Hall
18 March	Brighton	United Kingdom	Brighton Centre
19 March	Southampton	United Kingdom	Mayflower Theatre
20 March	Nottingham	United Kingdom	Royal Concert Hall
22 March	Bath	United Kingdom	Forum
23 March	London	United Kingdom	The Palladium
Oceania
16 April	Melbourne	Australia	Hamer Hall

== Reception ==
Professional ratings
Review scores
Source	Rating
Daily Star	5/5 stars
The Guardian	4/5 stars
Manchester Theatres	5/5 stars
Metro	5/5 stars

Scott Bryan from The Guardian rated the show four out of five stars. He noted the excitement at the tour was "palpable". He believed the "leaned heavily into discussing the more surreal elements" of Neighbours, adding that this surrealism continued throughout the show. Bryan preferred the show's second act which featured the entire cast being interviewed together. He thought that this format should have been followed throughout. He opined that the show was at its "strongest" when the cast "spoke frankly" about the show's cancellation. It also ended with a rather touching moment" with the re-enactment of Susan's monologue. Bryan concluded that "it felt like a rare and genuine opportunity to say thank you."

Katherine Hollisey-McLean from the Sussex Express enthused "what a celebration it was!" She branded it "an evening of reminiscence" and "sheer delight" when the show's cast entered the stage. She likened it to a "chat-show format". She also praised Fletcher's performance of the "Susie K" song, calling it "the best part of the night". Hollisey-McLean enjoyed it so much she hoped for an additional tour, concluding "it was everything. All Saturday nights should end that way."

Robert Jones from Manchester Theatres gave the show a five-star rating. He praised Boleto's "brilliant" presenting skills, adding "everything came natural to her and she truly represented the fans. Because she spoke from the heart." Jones also praised the inclusion of Pengilly, who "nicely" bridged the gap between the old and new generations of the show. He called it "a very emotional event" and the entire cast chat segment "delved deeper" into their emotions until they and the audience cried. Jones summarised it as "the ultimate fan experience" and "120 minutes of superb entertainment". He concluded that "what I witnessed tonight was incredible."

Stephen Patterson writing for Metro gave the show a five-star review. He assessed that the show evoked "all sorts of emotions" ranging from "joy" to an "overwhelming sense of happiness". He branded it "the ultimate fan experience" and "a very special night that will live in fans' hearts forever." He noted there was a "sheer sense of camaraderie and love" in the show and that it was "truly something else". The critic praised the range of topics discussed in the show, noting it was ideal for any generation that watched the show. Patterson applauded Boleto's presentation and believed she "expertly led the event". Patterson concluded the show was "the perfect blend of everything that a fan could ever want, and my heart couldn't have been any fuller upon exiting the venue."
