= Tim Kano =

New Zealand actor and model

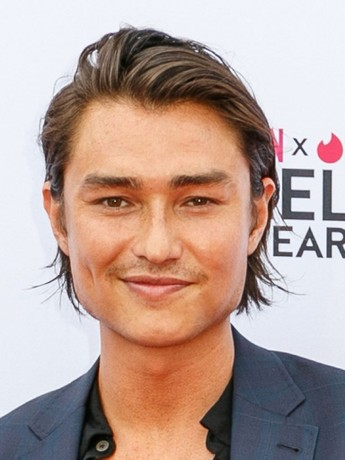
- Kano in 2017
- Born: Christchurch, New Zealand
- Years active: 2001–present

Tim Kano is a New Zealand actor, known for playing Leo Tanaka in the Australian television soap opera Neighbours from 2016. He also stars in the 2021 horror film Great White.

== Early life ==
Kano's mother Sue is from New Zealand with Irish heritage, and his father Fujio, was Japanese. Kano was born in Christchurch and grew up between Wellington and Japan with his sister Maya. Upon returning to New Zealand after spending his primary school years in Japan, Kano took modelling and acting jobs and completed a media and film studies course. Kano returned to Japan to study Political Science at university in Tokyo. Working in politics was a goal for Kano, who worked for MP Chris Carter for a year.

== Career ==
Beginning his career in New Zealand, Kano played an extra in The Lord of the Rings and had some other small parts in TV and movies from 2001. In 2009, he starred in the interactive online drama series Reservoir Hill.

Kano's big break came when he joined Australian soap opera, Neighbours in 2016 as entrepreneur Leo Tanaka. He obtained the role after auditioning for both Leo and his twin brother David Tanaka, which eventually went to Takaya Honda. Kano said he grew up watching Neighbours in New Zealand and found meeting the actors "amazing but a bit confronting". With the goal of making a life in Hollywood, Kano left Neighbours in 2019, but made a return in 2021.

In 2019, Kano filmed the movie Great White in which he plays Joji, a Japanese businessman. In 2021, Kano played Ian in the TV comedy series, The Power of the Dream. He also featured in the Paramount+ comedy series Spreadsheet.

== Personal life ==
Kano resides in Melbourne with his dog and is a fan of 1950s American men's style.

Once a singer in a punk band, Kano can also play guitar.

Franklin Fisher of the band Algiers, is Kano's brother in-law.

In 2018, Kano was nominated as a Cosmopolitan Bachelor of the Year.

== Filmography ==
Year	Title	Role	Notes
2001	The Tribe	Chosen Guard Clark	Guest role
2003	Freaky	Ryan	Episode: "Slide, Lab-Rats & Radio"
2008	Loss of Innocence	Major Phelps	Short film
2009–2010	Reservoir Hill	Matt Moorland	Guest role
2015	Holding The Man	Ian	Guest role
2016	Winners & Losers	Jamie Walton	Episode: "Ready Set Go"
2016	Road Trip	Leo Tanaka	Web series
2016–2025	Neighbours	Leo Tanaka	Main cast
2016	Summer Stories	Leo Tanaka	Web series
2017	Neighbours vs Time Travel	Leo Tanaka	Web series
2021	Great White	Joji Minase	Feature film
2021	The Power Of The Dream	Ian	Guest role
2021	Spreadsheet	Chase	Episode: "Banjos & Dirty Duck"
2022	La Brea	Anthony	Episode: "The Fog"
2023	Love Me	Lindsay	1 episode
