= Australian family law =

Australian family law is principally found in the federal Family Law Act 1975 and the Federal Circuit and Family Court of Australia (Family Law) Rules 2021 as well as in other laws and the common law and laws of equity, which affect the family and the relationship between those people, including when those relationships end. Most family law is practised in the Federal Circuit and Family Court of Australia and the Family Court of Western Australia. Australia recognises marriages entered into overseas as well as divorces obtained overseas if they were effected in accordance with the laws of that country. Australian marriage and "matrimonial causes" are recognised by sections 51(xxi) and (xxii) of the Constitution of Australia and internationally by marriage law and conventions, such as the Hague Convention on Marriages (1978).

Australia's laws on divorce and other legal family matters were overhauled in 1975 with the enactment of the Family Law Act 1975, which established no-fault divorce in Australia. Since 1975, the only ground for divorce has been irretrievable breakdown of marriage, evidenced by a twelve-month separation. However, a residual "fault" element remains in relation to child custody and property settlement issues. The federal Family Law Act 1975 covers divorce, children's orders, property division, spousal maintenance and related matters.

== Annulment ==
Under the Family Law Act 1975, a decree of nullity can be made if a marriage is void. Annulment does not involve termination of a marriage, but rather a declaration the purported marriage is in-fact void.

What constitutes a void marriage is determined by section 23 of the Marriage Act 1961 The distinction that existed before 1975 between void and voidable marriages no longer exists. In addition, the 1975 Act also abolished the legal concept of non-consummation of marriage as a ground for annulment, so that a divorce application would need to be made.

A marriage is void if:

- one or both of the parties were already married at the time (i.e. bigamy)
- the parties are in a prohibited relationship (i.e. closely related such as siblings)
- the parties did not comply with the marriage laws in the jurisdiction where they were married (although a marriage contracted abroad is in general considered valid in Australia, in certain cases, such as when there are serious contradictions with the marriage laws of Australia, the marriage is void)
- one or both of the parties were under-age and did not have the necessary approvals, (minimum marriageable age is 16, but 16 and 17 years-olds need special court approval) or
- one or both of the parties were forced into the marriage.

An application for a decree of nullity takes precedence over an application for divorce, so that if it is found that a marriage is void, then divorce application becomes irrelevant, though other remedies may still be available.

=== Recent cases ===
==== Kallestad v Brodie ====
In Kallestad v Brodie, the husband (Mr Kallestad) sought declaration that his marriage was void on the grounds that his wife (Ms Brodie) had previously been married to another person with that marriage still being live at the time Mr Kallestad was married to Ms Brodie. The Family Court of Australia found the marriage was void on the grounds Ms Brodie's original marriage was still valid at the time the second marriage was made.

Bown v Jalloh

In Bown v Jalloh, the wife (Ms Bown) sought declaration that her marriage was void on the grounds that her husband (Mr Jalloh) had not disclosed his full past to her and so she had married him on grounds of mistaken identity because his name was slightly different. Ms Bown had located a drivers licence issued in the county from where Mr Jalloh originated, which had his name written as 'Jalloph'. Ms Bown sought to end the marriage due to other personal matters about her husband he had not disclosed to her. However, the Family Court of Australia noted that misrepresentations that could induce consent to marriage relating to age, wealth, social status or other background were not relevant to whether or not Ms Brown consented to marry Mr Jalloh on the day she did, and so the application was dismissed.

== Divorce ==
=== No-fault divorce ===
Australia has no-fault divorce with the only ground for divorce being a claim of an irretrievable breakdown of marriage, evidenced by a twelve-month separation. Sometimes the couple may still be living together in the same home and be considered separated. If that is the case for any part of the twelve months before filing the application.

A sole applicant will need to submit an affidavit containing proof of this separation. additionally an affidavit from a neutral third party.

For a joint application both parties should file an affidavit, a third party affidavit is NOT needed in this case.

If the parties have reconciled for 3 months or more, then the 12-month qualification period has to start anew.

Though the Commonwealth had the power since federation in 1901 to make laws affecting divorce and related matters such as custody and maintenance, it did not enact uniform national laws until 1961, when the Matrimonial Causes Act 1959 came into operation. The Act continued the fault-based system operating under state authority. Under the Commonwealth law a spouse had to establish one of the 14 grounds for divorce set out in the Act, including adultery, desertion, cruelty, habitual drunkenness, imprisonment and insanity.

In reality, the system was very expensive and humiliating for the spouses, necessitating appointment of barristers, often private detectives, collection of evidence, obtaining witness statements, photographs and hotel receipts, etc. Failure to prove a spouse's guilt or wrongdoing would result in a judge refusing to grant a divorce. The Matrimonial Causes Act 1959 was replaced by no-fault divorce system of the Family Law Act 1975.

=== Divorce application ===
Either party to a marriage may apply to the Federal Circuit and Family Court of Australia for a divorce, or both parties may apply jointly. However, an application for divorce cannot be filed before the expiration of at least two years since the marriage had been entered into. The application can be lodged online or using a hard copy form. A fee is payable. If the application is made by one spouse (called a "sole application"), the divorce documents must be served on the other spouse, at least 28 days before the court hearing if the spouse is in Australia or 42 days if overseas.

The spouse can challenge the application in a "response", claiming, for example, that the timeframes set out in the Act have not been satisfied, or that the applicant is not an Australian citizen or resident, etc. The response must also be served on the applicant and filed in court. If both spouses agree to divorce a "joint application" is filed, which does not need to be served and no response can be made.

An application for divorce can be made in Australia if either spouse:

- regards Australia as their home and intends to live indefinitely in Australia and is an Australian citizen or resident, or
- is an Australian citizen by birth or descent or is a naturalised Australian citizen (in which case a citizenship certificate will be required), or
- ordinarily lives in Australia and has done so for 12 months immediately before filing for divorce.

Neither spouse can remarry before the divorce becomes final, which is usually one month and one day after the divorce is granted in court. Such a marriage would constitute bigamy and would be illegal and void.

If there are children of the marriage aged under 18, a court can only grant a divorce if it is satisfied that proper arrangements have been made for them. A child of the marriage includes:

- any child of either spouse, including a child born before the marriage or after separation,
- any child adopted by the spouses or either of them, or
- any child who was treated as a member of the family prior to the final separation; for example, a step-child or foster child.

A copy of the marriage certificate must be provided with the application. The same rules apply if the marriage was entered into overseas, except that if the marriage certificate is not in English, an English translation must be provided, with an affidavit from the translator.

After the divorce is finalised, each party can apply to the Federal Circuit and Family Court of Australia (or the Family Court of Western Australia for residents of that state) for a proof of divorce certificate.

== De facto couples ==
Since 1 March 2009 (1 July 2010 in South Australia), in all states or territories except Western Australia, matters arising from separations of de facto relationships, such as child custody and property rights, are also covered by the Family Law Act under powers conferred to the Commonwealth by five of the states. Since 2009, the definition of "de facto couple" under the federal Act has included same-sex couples and applies throughout Australia, except Western Australia.

A de facto couple must cohabit for a minimum of two years for the Family Law Act to apply, unless if they have a child together, have registered the relationship, or have made significant contributions to the relationship. Parties to a de facto relationship have only two years after separation in which to file for property and/or spousal maintenance in the Family Court.

Before March 2009, state and territory laws applied to de facto relationships, and continues to apply in Western Australia. The names for de facto and similar relationships in each state and territory were/are as follows:

State/territory	Name	Law
New South Wales/Norfolk Island	"Domestic relationship", encompassing "de facto relationships" and "close personal relationships"	Before 1 March 2009, Property (Relationships) Act 1984. Since July 1, 2016 all NSW laws also apply to the approximately 2,000 residents on Norfolk Island, under both the Norfolk Island Legislation Amendment Act 2015 and the Territories Legislation Amendment Act 2016 - because the Norfolk Island Legislative Assembly was abolished on 1 July 2015.
Victoria	"Domestic relationship", defined to mean "de facto relationships"	Before 1 March 2009, Relationships Act 2008 (Vic). Property Law Act 1958 Part IX has now been repealed effective 1 December 2008, now encompassed in the Relationships Act 2008.
Queensland	"De facto relationship"	Before 1 March 2009, Property Law Act 1974
South Australia	"Close personal relationship"	Before 1 July 2010, Domestic Partners Property Act 1996
Western Australia	"De facto relationship"	Family Court Act 1997, Part 5A
Tasmania	"Personal relationship", encompassing "significant relationships" and "caring relationships"	Before 1 March 2009, Relationships Act 2003
Australian Capital Territory	"Domestic relationship" and "domestic partnership"	Before 1 March 2009, Domestic Relationships Act 1994, Legislation Act 2001 s 169
Northern Territory	"De facto relationship"	Before 1 March 2009, De Facto Relationships Act 1991

=== Recognition outside Australia ===
Because of how the power from state or territory to federal jurisdiction was conferred (see Section 51(xxxvii) of the Australian Constitution), de facto couples outside Australia are not covered by the Family Law Act. This is because there must be a nexus between the de facto couple and a state or territory, as the law can only be applied within a state or territory.

If a de facto couple moves out of an Australian state or territory they do not take the state or territory with them so the law cannot apply to them. The legal status and rights and obligations of the de facto or unmarried couple would then be recognised by the country's laws of where they are ordinarily resident. See the section on Federal Circuit and Family Court of Australia for further explanation on jurisdiction on de facto relationships. This is unlike marriage, which is legally recognised internationally outside of the country of marriage.

== Laws affecting children ==
The family law framework also deals with parenting arrangements to ensure the best interests of children, especially in circumstances where they are at risk or where their parents or carers are separating. Although child protection is primarily dealt with on a state and territory basis, under state and territory legislation, parenting arrangements could also be dealt with under the federal Family Law Act 1975.

A government-administered child support scheme enables parents to reach private agreements, or to register with the Child Support Agency Australia, which may require one parent to make payments to the other, depending on the division of care and on each parent's income, among other factors. Since 1989 child support has been assessed under the Child Support (Assessment) Act 1989, administered by Child Support Agency Australia.

Australian domestic law also enacts some of Australia's obligations under international law, such as the Hague Convention on the Civil Aspects of International Child Abduction, which is dealt with in the Family Law Act 1975.

On 22 May 2006, the Family Law Act 1975 was amended by the Family Law Amendment (Shared Parental Responsibility) Act 2006, which applies to any court matters involving children that were in court on or after 1 July 2006. The primary object of this law is to ensure that courts always have the "best interests of the child" as the paramount consideration. An object of this law is to ensure that the best interests of children are met by ensuring that "children have the benefit of both of their parents having a meaningful involvement in their lives, to the maximum extent consistent with the best interests of the child".

Many argue that such an arrangement actually works against achieving this, and today continue to push for further reform. In the last decade not one Australian father has been given equal parenting access in any case reported on the Austlii website. Instead judges applied the McInstosh-Chisholm doctrine that sought to limit time children spend with children. This approach has now been debunked by academics, even though never challenged by any family court judge.

== Property and financial outcomes ==
Australia is an equitable distribution country, meaning that on divorce or death of a spouse net wealth is not split evenly (50/50) as community property. Instead courts have wide powers, taking into account 27 or so statutory factors, to determine what a "just and equitable" division of wealth would be. The vast majority of outcomes result in a division of 55-65% in favour of the wife, or economically weaker spouse, before payment of legal fees. This process is not without its critics: on average the wealth re-allocation process takes between 2 years, or for the more wealthy, up to 4 years.

=== Property Settlement ===
Under the Family Law Act a court can make orders dividing the assets, liabilities and superannuation of spouses, and other related orders. The court must approach the decision according to the "4 step process":

1. ascertain the assets, liabilities and superannuation of the parties;
2. assess the contributions that each party made to the asset pool;
3. assess the relevant factors set out in section 75(2), often referred to as the "future needs" factors;
4. consider whether the outcome is "just and equitable" and make any relevant adjustments.

The relevant date to ascertain the property "pool" is at the time of trial, not the time of separation.

Contributions made to the relationship include financial contributions (e.g. income, inheritances, assets held at the commencement of the relationship), non-financial contributions (e.g. unpaid labour, assistance running a business) and parenting and homemaker contributions (e.g. domestic duties and care of children). Contributions as homemaker and parent are not presumed to be of lesser value than financial contributions.

Section 75(2) ("future needs") factors allow an adjustment to be made between the parties to take account of particular circumstances. Common relevant circumstances include the care of children, a disparity of income, and the impact on the relationship of time out of the workforce.

Under the Family Law Act, a court has the power to "split" superannuation from one spouse to another. A court can make orders for property settlement or spousal maintenance after the death of a party, but only if proceedings were commenced prior to the death of that party.

The court may decline to make any orders, leaving the legal and equitable interests of the parties as they were.

=== Spousal Maintenance ===
Parties to a marriage or a de facto relationship have the right to apply for spousal maintenance from the other party. The party making an application must demonstrate:

1. his or her need for spousal maintenance, and
2. that the other party has the capacity to pay spousal maintenance.

If made, an order for spousal maintenance is usually for a limited period to allow a party to retrain, return to the workforce or care for young children.

=== Binding Financial Agreements ===
Under Part VIIIA of the Family Law Act (for de facto couples: Division 4 of Part VIIIAB), parties may opt-out of the ability of the court to make orders in respect of property settlement or spousal maintenance by use of a valid Binding Financial Agreement. The effect of a valid Binding Financial Agreement is to prevent a Court making orders under Part VIII of the Family Law Act (or the corresponding de facto provisions), meaning that property will be divided and/or spousal maintenance will be dealt with in accordance with the provisions of the agreement. A Binding Financial Agreement can only be valid if both parties have received independent legal advice before the agreement was signed.

A 2019 Canstar study found that only 6% of Australian Couples have a Binding Financial Agreement in place, meaning over 90% of Australian couples once separated are still required to divide wealth according to what the family law act sees as "just and equitable".

A Binding Financial Agreement that attempts to limit a person's ability to claim for spousal maintenance will be invalid if the party was unable to support himself or herself without a pension when the agreement came into effect.

A Binding Financial Agreement may be set aside in limited circumstances.

== Other actions abolished ==
Since 1975, the actions for criminal conversation, damages for adultery and enticement of a party to a marriage have been abolished. Claims for damages for breach of promise to marry were abolished by Section 111A of the Marriage Act 1961.

== See also ==
- Federal Circuit and Family Court of Australia
- Marriage in Australia
- Family Law Legislation Amendment (Family Violence and Other Measures) Act 2011
