= Marriage Act 1961 (Australia) =

Law regulating marriage in Australia

Parliament of Australia
- Long title: An Act relating to Marriage
- Citation: Marriage Act 1961 (Cth)
- Assented to: 6 May 1961

Amended by
- Marriage Amendment (Definition and Religious Freedoms) Act 2017, Marriage Amendment Act 2004
- Status: Current legislation

The Marriage Act 1961 (Cth) is an act of the Parliament of Australia which regulates marriage in Australia. Since its passage in 1961, it has been amended on numerous occasions and applies uniformly throughout Australia (including its external territories); and any law made by a state or territory inconsistent with the act is invalid. The act was made under the power granted to the federal parliament under section 51(xxi) of the Australian Constitution. Before the passage of the act, each state and territory had its own marriage laws.

An amendment to the act to legalise same-sex marriage passed into law in the Marriage Amendment (Definition and Religious Freedoms) Act 2017 on 9 December 2017. Marriage is defined as "the union of 2 people to the exclusion of all others, voluntarily entered into for life."

The Marriage Act 1961 regulates the contracting of marriages within Australia and sets marriage impediments. The act only recognises monogamous marriages that comply with the requirements of the act; other forms of union, including traditional Aboriginal marriages, are not recognised.

However, the Family Law Act 1975, which deals with certain aspects of family law, including divorce, property division upon the end of a relation, parenting arrangements between separated parents (whether married or not), financial maintenance, and family violence, treats as marriages for the purposes outlined in that act other forms of relationships also, such as de facto relationships (since 2009, the Family Law Act 1975 has recognised the property rights of each partner of de facto relationships on separation), and also states that "For the purpose of proceedings under this Act, a union in the nature of a marriage which is, or has at any time been, polygamous, being a union entered into in a place outside Australia, shall be deemed to be a marriage". The Family Law Act 1975, which came into force on 5 January 1976, also introduced no fault divorce in Australian law, repealing the previous Matrimonial Causes Act 1961, which had been largely based on fault.

== The act ==
=== Marriageable age ===
Part II (sections 10–21) deals with the marriageable age and the marriage of minors. In the original 1961 act, marriageable age was set at 16 for females and 18 for males. However, under section 12 of the original 1961 act a female 14 or 15 years or a male 16 or 17 years could apply to the court for permission to marry. The general marriageable age (without exceptions) was equalised in 1991 by the Sex Discrimination Amendment Act 1991, which raised the general marriageable age of females to 18.

The marriage of a person aged 16 or 17 to another aged over 18 is permitted in "unusual and exceptional circumstances", which requires the consent of the younger person's parents and authorisation by a court. Prior to the 1991 changes, the "unusual and exceptional circumstances" procedures applied to a girl aged 14 or 15 (wanting to marry a male aged 18 or above) or a male aged 16 or 17 (wanting to marry a female aged 16 or above).

In deciding whether to make an order allowing a marriage, the judge or magistrate must be satisfied that the person is at least 16 years old and that the circumstances of the case are exceptional and unusual. The types of things that the court might consider include:

- The length of their relationship with their partner
- Their financial situation
- How independent they are as a couple
- Why they want to get married
- What their families think of them getting married

=== Void marriages ===
Part III entitled "void marriages" establishes the circumstances in which a marriage is void. To preserve the validity of past marriages, this part is divided into periods based on when amendments to the act were introduced. A purported marriage is void if:

- either party is already married (bigamy, polygamy).
- the parties are in a prohibited relationship: direct descendants or siblings, including by legal adoption.
- the marriage was not solemnised by an authorised celebrant (as in Part IV, Division 2).
- there is no consent, for example due to duress, fraud, mistake as to identity, mistake as to the nature of ceremony, mental incapacity, or being below the marriageable age set out in Part II.

=== Solemnisation of marriages ===
Part IV, entitled "Solemnisation of Marriages in Australia", deals with who is authorised to be a wedding celebrant, and the procedures to be followed. It also contains a division on marriages by foreign diplomatic or consular officers.

==== Authorised celebrants ====
Division 1 deals with authorised celebrants. Under the current Act three types of celebrants are allowed: ministers of religion, state and territory officers, and civil marriage celebrants.

===== Religious ministers =====
Under Subdivision A, a register is kept of ministers of religion (section 27) of "recognised" denominations (section 26). The only requirements for registration is that the person is a minister of religion who is nominated by their denomination, is resident in Australia, and is at least 21 years old (section 29). A minister will be registered (section 30) unless the registrar refuses registration because there are sufficient ministers of that denomination, or if the minister is "not a fit and proper person" or will not devote sufficient time to the functions of a minister of religion (section 31).

Ministers of religion are not bound to solemnise any marriage. Nothing in Part IV of the Act imposes an obligation on an authorised celebrant, being a minister of religion, to solemnise any marriage (section 47).

===== Registry office marriages =====
Subdivision B (section 39) preserves the power of "state and territory officers", allowing people who register marriages (under a state law) to also solemnise marriages (i.e. registry marriages).

===== Civil celebrants =====
Subdivision C deals with "marriage celebrants", or the authorisation of people to conduct civil ceremonies. Section 39B allows the register to be kept and sections 39D-39E are procedural and seek to set up processes to control the number of celebrants.

This section was introduced by the Marriage Amendment Act 2002, after an attorney-general inquiry into the Civil Celebrants Program. Prior to the passage of this amendment the authorisation of celebrants was entirely contained in section 39, which in subsection (2) allowed the recognition of other "fit and proper persons" as civil marriage celebrants, religious celebrants outside a recognised denomination, and celebrants with special community needs.

The original 1961 act therefore allowed civil ceremonies, and the first civil celebrants were authorised in 1973. By the time the 2002 amendments were introduced, civil celebrants performed over 50% of marriages. The changes therefore provide legislative recognition to civil celebrants, and prescribe a regime beyond being "fit and proper" in order to control the quality and number of celebrants.

Section 39C now lists a number of requirements to be registered as civil celebrant, in addition to being at least 18 years old and "fit and proper". The registrar will take into account: knowledge of the law; commitment to advising couples about relationship counselling; community standing; criminal record, the existence of a conflict of interest or benefit to business; and "any other matter". Section 39G imposes "obligations" on civil celebrants. These include professional development and an adherence to a code of practice. Sections 39H, 39I, and 39J set up a review of celebrants and a disciplinary system.

Significantly, Subdivision C deals only with marriage celebrants (civil or not from a recognised religion), not with ministers of religion, who are governed by Subdivision A. As a result, ministers of religion are not necessarily subject to the same obligations or code of practice.

=== Recognition of foreign marriages ===
Part VA deals with recognition of foreign marriages.

This part reflects the act's tendency to seek to uphold the validity of marriages. Marriages will be recognised if they were valid in the country where they were performed and if the marriage would be legal under Australian law. The foreign marriage certificate is proof of marriage and such marriages need not be registered in Australia.

As a marriage must be legal under Australian law, a foreign marriage will not be recognised if, for example, a person was already married (or the overseas divorce is not recognised in Australia), a person was aged under 18 (subject to some exceptions), the persons were direct descendants or siblings, or there was duress or fraud.

=== Other provisions ===
- Marriages by foreign diplomatic or consular officers (Division 3 of Part IV): there are currently no Australian diplomatic or consular officers appointed to solemnise marriages overseas under Australian law.
- Marriages of members of the Defence Force overseas: Part V of the Act deals with marriages of members of the Defence Force overseas.
- Legitimation (Part VI): The act legitimises children if their parents marry, including in some cases the children of foreign marriages and in certain situations the children of void marriages.
- Offences (Part VII): covers various offences including bigamy, marrying a person below the marriageable age (child marriage), and (for celebrants) solemnising a marriage where they believed there to be a legal impediment.
- Miscellaneous provisions in Part IX: covers the role of interpreters, the publication of lists of celebrants, and other matters.
- Section 111A removed the ability to seek to recover damages for breach of contract where a promise to marry (an engagement) did not lead to marriage.

=== Marriage education ===
Part IA authorises the government to make grants to approved organisations for marriage counselling.

== Amendments ==
Two amendments of note to the act have been made with respect to the legal definition of marriage in Australia, both of which relate to same-sex marriage.

=== Marriage Amendment Act 2004 ===
Before 2004, there was no definition of marriage in the 1961 act, and instead the common law definition used in the English case Hyde v Hyde (1866) was considered supreme. Though section 46(1) of the act required celebrants to explain the legal nature of marriage in Australia to a couple as "the union of a man and a woman to the exclusion of all others, voluntarily entered into for life", these words were descriptive or explanatory, rather than outlining what constituted a legally valid marriage in Australia.

On 27 May 2004 the then federal attorney-general Philip Ruddock introduced the Marriage Amendment Bill 2004 to incorporate a definition of marriage into the Marriage Act 1961 and to outlaw the recognition of same-sex marriages lawfully entered into in foreign jurisdictions. In June 2004, the bill passed the House of Representatives. On 12 August 2004, the amendment passed the Senate. The bill subsequently received royal assent, becoming the Marriage Amendment Act 2004.

The amendment incorporated a definition of marriage into section 5 of the Act, known as the Interpretation section:

marriage means the union of a man and a woman to the exclusion of all others, voluntarily entered into for life.

and inserted a new section:

88EA Certain unions are not marriages
A union solemnised in a foreign country between:
(a) a man and another man; or
(b) a woman and another woman;
must not be recognised as a marriage in Australia.

The amendment was argued by Ruddock and Liberal MPs to be necessary to protect the institution of marriage, and to ensure that the definition would be beyond legal challenge through the application of common law. Several years later, then-prime minister John Howard admitted that the government was motivated by the prospect of overseas same-sex marriages being recognised under Australian law via the judiciary. Labor Party shadow attorney-general Nicola Roxon said that the Labor Party would not oppose the amendment, arguing that the amendment did not affect the legal situation of same-sex relationships, merely putting into statute law what was already common law. Likewise minor parties Family First and the Christian Democrats supported the bill, as did the junior party in the Coalition government, the National Party.

The Australian Greens opposed the bill, calling it the "Marriage Discrimination Act". The Australian Democrats also opposed the bill. Democrats Senator Andrew Bartlett stated that the legislation devalued his marriage, and Greens Senator Bob Brown referred to John Howard and the legislation as "hateful".

Not all of Labor was in support of the bill. During the bill's second reading, Labor MP Anthony Albanese said, "what has caused offence is why the government has rushed in this legislation in what is possibly the last fortnight of parliamentary sittings. This bill is a result of 30 bigoted backbenchers who want to press buttons out there in the community."

=== Marriage Amendment (Definition and Religious Freedoms) Act 2017 ===
Ahead of both the 2007 and 2010 federal elections, the Labor Party re-asserted its official opposition to amending the Act to legalise same-sex marriage, but by 2011 a clear majority of the party at the national conference succeeded in changing party policy in favour of the practice. Prime Minister Julia Gillard (opposed to same-sex marriage at the time) successfully moved for Labor Party MPs to be granted a conscience vote on same-sex marriage legislation. This, along with the Coalition's uniform opposition to same-sex marriage while in opposition, prevented two bills which would have legalised same-sex marriage in Australia from passing the House of Representatives and the Senate in September 2012.

The Abbott government (2013–15) initially opposed same-sex marriage, but in August 2015 resolved to put the matter to the people at a plebiscite after the 2016 federal election. This policy was retained by the Turnbull government (2015–18), though due to the refusal of the Senate to support the legislation to establish a plebiscite, the government conducted a voluntary postal survey on the matter from September to November 2017. The survey returned 61.6% 'Yes' vote in favour of same-sex marriage. The government subsequently committed to facilitating the passage of a private member's bill to amend the Act, and legalise same-sex marriage, by the end of 2017.

The bill in question, the Marriage Amendment (Definition and Religious Freedoms) Bill 2017, was introduced by Liberal Party Senator Dean Smith on 15 November 2017. The bill amends the definition of "marriage" in the Act, omitting the words "man and a woman" and replacing it with the gender-neutral "2 people". The bill passed the Senate by 43 votes to 12 on 29 November 2017 and passed the House of Representatives on 7 December 2017, with only four votes against. It was given royal assent by the governor-general, Sir Peter Cosgrove, on 8 December 2017.

The act had the effect of amending the definition of marriage in Section 5 of the Marriage Act:

marriage means the union of 2 people to the exclusion of all others, voluntarily entered into for life.

It also repealed section 88EA, which banned the recognition of overseas same-sex marriages. Consequently, when the act went into effect on 9 December 2017, such couples became automatically recognised as married under the law.

The original act and the amendment also applies to Australia's external territories.

== Legacy ==
In October 2013, same-sex marriage was legalised in the Australian Capital Territory (ACT) by the Marriage Equality (Same Sex) Act 2013. The ACT legislation was overturned by the High Court for being inconsistent with the Marriage Act 1961. This was due to the definition of the term "marriage" in the Marriage Act 1961, which from 2004 to 2017 excluded all types of marriage other than that between one man and one woman.

== See also ==
- Celebrant (Australia) – People who conduct formal ceremonies
- Marriage Act
- Marriage in Australia
- Same-sex marriage in Australia

== External sources ==
- Proposal to Reform the Civil Marriage Celebrants Programme
- Discussion Paper on Civil Celebrants Programme (October 1997)
- Bills Digest on the Marriage Amendment Act 2002
- Recognition of Foreign Marriages
