= Public opinion of same-sex marriage in Australia =

Public opinion of same-sex marriage in Australia has shifted from 38% support in 2004 to majority support of 75% in 2023.

== Opinion polls ==
=== 2000s ===
A June 2004 poll conducted by Newspoll showed that 38% of respondents supported same-sex marriage in Australia, with 44% opposed and 18% undecided.

In June 2007, a Galaxy Research poll conducted for advocacy group GetUp! measured the opinions of 1,100 Australians aged 16 and over and found that 57% of respondents supported same-sex marriage, 37% were opposed and 6% were unsure. The poll also found that 71% of respondents supported same-sex couples having the same legal entitlements as opposite-sex de facto couples.

A June 2009 poll conducted by Galaxy Research and commissioned by the Australian Marriage Equality group measured the opinions of 1,100 Australians aged 16 and over and found that 60% of respondents supported the recognition of same-sex marriage, with 36% opposed and 4% undecided. Among Greens voters 82% supported same-sex marriage, whilst 74% of those aged 16–24 supported same-sex marriage. Those aged 50 or above were the only age bracket to oppose same-sex marriage recognition, at a 55% disapproval rate.

=== 2010s ===
An October 2010 poll conducted by Galaxy Research and commissioned by Australian Marriage Equality measured the opinions of 1,050 Australians aged 18 and over and found that 62% of respondents supported the recognition of same-sex marriage, with 33% opposed and 5% undecided. The poll found 78% of respondents supported a conscience vote on the recognition of same-sex marriage, with 16% opposed and 6% undecided. Support was highest amongst those respondents aged 18–24 (84%), and who lived in South Australia (83%). The majority of respondents from each state and each age bracket were in support.

A March 2011 poll conducted by Essential Media found that support for same-sex marriage had fallen below 50% and opposition was up by 4%.

A July 2011 poll of 543 people conducted by Roy Morgan Research measured the support for a number of positions on marriage and found that 68% of Australians support same-sex marriage and 78% classified marriage as a "necessary" institution, with only 22% stating it was an "unnecessary" institution.

A November 2011 Galaxy Research poll, commissioned by the Australian Marriage Equality group, of over 1,000 voters found that 80% agreed that Tony Abbott should allow the Liberal/National Coalition a conscience vote on same-same marriage legislation as the Australian Labor Party do. Support for a conscience vote among Coalition supporters reached an all-time high of 76%.

A February 2012 online poll of 1,506 Australian adult members on the Nine Rewards website by Angus Reid Public Opinion found that 49% of respondents said same-sex couples should be allowed to legally marry, 31% said they should be allowed to enter into civil unions but not marry and 14% opposed any legal recognition. No attempt was made to make the survey representative of the entire population, and the Nine Rewards website is associated with the Nine Network, an Australian television channel popular with older and more conservative viewers.

From February to April 2012, the House of Representatives conducted an online survey to provide a simple means for the public to voice their views on same-sex marriage and the two bills in the Parliament which sought to legalise it, the Marriage Equality Amendment Bill 2012 and the Marriage Amendment Bill 2012. The survey closed on 20 April, having received approximately 276,000 responses, including about 213,500 comments. Of these responses, 64.3% supported same-sex marriage, or approximately 177,600 of the respondents. The report acknowledged that "The online survey was not a statistically valid, random poll. Respondents were self-selected, in that they chose to participate if they wished."

A May 2013 Ipsos poll found that 54% of respondents were in favour of same-sex marriage and another 20% supported another form of recognition for same-sex couples. Results from the August 2013 Vote Compass survey of Australian voters found that 52% of respondents supported same-sex marriage, 12% were neutral, and 36% believed that marriage "should only be between a man and a woman". A 2015 Vote Compass survey with 20,000 respondents found 53% supported same-sex marriage, 10% neutral and 36% opposed. Support for same-sex marriage was higher among women, people with university degrees and higher incomes, and people under 34.

An August 2013 poll conducted by Fairfax Media and Nielson Polling found that 65% of respondents supported legalising marriage between same-sex couples, up 8 points since December 2011, while only 28% were opposed (down 7 points). Support was greater among women (75%) than men (55%) and greater among younger voters than older voters. 57% of respondents said that same-sex marriage was "not important at all" in deciding how they would vote in the coming election. Even for those supporting same-sex marriage 49% said that the issue was "not important at all" in deciding their vote.

In June 2014, Crosby Textor Group was commissioned by Australian Marriage Equality to poll the public on same-sex marriage. Their survey included the following questions on the common reasons for opposition:

Reason	Agree (%)	Disagree (%)
People who choose to be gay know that their choice means they cannot get married	30%	58%
It is fine for same-sex couples to have a ceremony, but it should not be called "marriage"	30%	63%
The recognition of de facto relationships and civil unions is enough; we don't need same-sex marriage too	29%	63%
Children need both a mother and a father, and legalising same-sex marriage could break that down	29%	65%
The institution is already under threat and should not be further undermined by this	24%	67%
Marriage is only meant to be between a man and a woman, so this is wrong and should not be encouraged	24%	69%
Marriage is a religious institution and no changes should be made to it against the wishes of religious groups	23%	70%
Same-sex marriages could devalue traditional marriages	22%	73%
Allowing same-sex marriage will lead to some people losing their religious freedoms	16%	72%
Allowing same-sex marriage is a slippery slope and could lead to issues like polygamy	17%	74%

A July 2014 poll, commissioned by Australian Marriage Equality and conducted by the Crosby Textor Group found that 72% of Australians supported legalising same-sex marriage, while only 21% were opposed. A majority of those identifying with major religions supported same-sex marriage, including Catholics, Anglicans and non-Christian religions as did a majority of older Australians aged over 55. Mark Textor stated "This poll definitively puts pay to some of the myths that married couples or those with religious beliefs are against same-sex marriage. It doesn't devalue their marriages or faith, and instead gives everyone equal access to the rights they are accorded". Further, 77% of respondents agreed that Coalition MPs and Senators should be granted a conscience vote on the issue. Jim Reed, director of Research and Strategy at the Crosby Textor Group argued in an opinion piece that the poll represented a "seismic shift in public attitudes towards marriage equality."

Also in July 2014 Newscorp's Newspoll recorded a high vote in favour of same-sex marriage, with two-thirds of respondents supporting marriage between same-sex couples.

A June 2015 Fairfax/Ipsos poll found 68% of respondents expressed support to the question Do you support or oppose legalising marriage between same-sex couples? 25% answered that they were opposed and 7% answered 'Don't Know'.

In July 2015, a Sexton research poll was undertaken to determine the most important issues the federal government should focus on. Survey respondents rated same-sex marriage as equal 13th as their prioritisation. The Australian activist group GetUp! polls the views of its members (termed Vision Surveys) to provide guidance for its "top campaign issues". GetUp! members ranked 'Marriage Equality' as campaign issue No. 16, scoring 2.1% of the votes. The Australian reports that recent research has placed doubts on the accuracy of earlier poll claims. The Australian also says there have been 5 Australian polls taken since May 2015 on 'support for same-sex marriage' with the respective results being 68%, 58%, 59%, 59% and 54%.

A Sexton Research survey, commissioned by Marriage Alliance (a group which does not support same-sex marriage) was undertaken in July 2015. The Sexton research has queried the findings of the above June 2014, Crosby Textor Group poll. It was also reported that same-sex marriage was ranked in national importance, by participants, in the Crosby Textor study as 13th priority. Same-sex marriage was rated as 16th in a GetUp! members survey.

In August 2015, Fairfax/Ipsos found SSM support constant at 69% with 25% opposed, although support was much higher among under-25s (88%) than over-55s (55%).

A community survey by Essential Media Communications in August 2015 showed support for same-sex marriage at 60% and support for a parliamentary vote at 22%, with support for a people's vote at 66% and in a Sexton survey of 1,200 people, support for a people's vote was 76%.

In September 2015, an Essential Media Communications poll found 67% of Australians wanted a peoples’ vote (i.e., referendum or plebiscite) to resolve the definition of marriage, with "little change since this question was asked in August". However, in October 2015, another Essential poll found that support for a people's vote on the issue fell to 43% when informed that "a national vote on same-sex marriage would cost around $150 million". 41% favoured a parliamentary vote. The same poll also found that 59% of respondents thought that "same-sex couples should be allowed to marry", 30% of respondents thought that "same-sex couples should not be allowed to marry", whilst 11% answered "do not know".

The ABC had a question in their pre-election VoteCompass from 2016 about support of same-sex marriage, drawing a response from 1.2 million people. They were able to break down the findings into electorate-level results, finding that most seats supported same-sex marriage, with support increasing around the major city centres, regardless of what party traditionally holds these seats. According to this data, Queensland has the least support for same-sex marriage.

A March 2016 Essential Media poll found that 64% of respondents agreed that same-sex couples should be allowed to marry, 26% stated they should not be allowed to marry and 11% answered "don't know".

A July 2016 Galaxy Research poll, commissioned by Parents and Friends of Lesbians and Gays, found decreasing levels of support for the plebiscite. Asked whether one supported having a plebiscite, 48% of respondents stated they did and 30% stated they did not. This marked a sharp drop in support for the plebiscite when contrasted with a June/July 2016 poll conducted by Fairfax Media and Ipsos, which found 69% approval for the plebiscite. In the Galaxy poll, the pro-plebiscite figure dropped to 35% when respondents were informed the plebiscite was not legally binding and dropped further to 25% when the $160 million expected cost of the plebiscite was raised.

An August 2016 Essential Media poll found that 57% of respondents stated they would vote 'yes' in a plebiscite to the question; "Do you approve of a law to permit people of the same-sex to marry?" A further 28% of respondents stated they would vote 'no' and 15% were unsure.

A poll carried out by the University of Melbourne in September 2016 found that Maranoa, in southwest Queensland, is the only electorate in the country where a majority of voters are opposed to same-sex marriage. The ten electorates most supportive of same-sex marriage are Sydney, Melbourne, Grayndler, Wentworth, Melbourne Ports, Wills, Gellibrand, Batman, Higgins and Brisbane. Less than 10% in Sydney and Melbourne are opposed to allowing same-sex couples to wed.

A July 2017 Essential Media poll found that 63% of respondents believed same-sex couples should be allowed to marry, 25% of respondents believed same-sex couples should not be allowed to marry and 12% did not know. In response to the question "do you think the issue of same-sex marriage should be decided by Parliament or should there be a national vote", 59% favoured a national vote, 29% said it should be decided by parliament and 12% responded "don't know".

== Marriage Law Postal Survey ==
In 2017, a voluntary, non-binding plebiscite was issued to gauge the country's support for same-sex marriage. All Australian citizens who were enrolled to vote and aged 18 or older were sent a survey which asked; "Should the law be changed to allow same-sex couples to marry?" In total, 12,727,920 surveys were returned (79.5%). Of these, 7,817,247 (61.6%) "Yes" votes were recorded, whilst 4,873,987 (38.4%) "No" votes were recorded. In addition, 36,686 (0.3%) votes were unclear either way.

== Summary table ==
Date	Firm	Support	Oppose	Undecided
13 March 2018	Essential	65%	26%	9%
9 November 2017	Lonergan Research	65%	27%	8%
9 November 2017	YouGov	60%	32%	8%
28 September - 1 October 2017	Essential	61%	32%	7%
15–18 September 2017	Essential	55%	34%	11%
12 September - 7 November 2017	Australian Bureau of Statistics	61.6%	38.4%	0.3%
28 August - 6 September 2017	Newgate Research	58.4%	31.4%	10.2%
1–4 September 2017	Essential	59%	31%	11%
17–22 August 2017	Essential	57%	32%	11%
17–21 August 2017	YouGov	59%	33%	8%
17–20 August 2017	Newspoll	63%	30%	7%
July 2017	Essential	63%	25%	12%
July 2017	YouGov	60%	28%	12%
February 2017	Galaxy	66%	–	–
September 2016	Newspoll	62%	32%	6%
August 2016	Essential	57%	28%	15%
March 2016	Essential	64%	26%	11%
March 2016	Roy Morgan	76%	24%	–
October 2015	Essential	59%	30%	11%
August 2015	Essential	60%	31%	10%
August 2015	Ipsos	69%	25%	6%
July 2015	ReachTEL	53.8%	32.8%	12.4%
June 2015	Ipsos	68%	25%	7%
July 2014	Newspoll	69%	26%	6%
July 2014	Crosby Textor	72%	21%	7%
August 2013	Nielson	65%	28%	7%
May 2013	Ipsos	54%	20%	26%
May 2013	Roy Morgan	65%	35%	–
August 2012	Galaxy	64%	30%	5%
July 2011	Roy Morgan	68%	30%	2%
October 2010	Galaxy	62%	33%	5%
June 2009	Galaxy	60%	36%	4%
June 2007	Galaxy	57%	37%	6%
June 2004	Newspoll	38%	44%	18%

== See also ==
- LGBT rights in Australia
- Public opinion of same-sex marriage in the United States
