= Voidable marriages (Australia) =

Until 1975, some marriages in Australia were voidable under Australian family law. The Family Law Act 1975 (Cth.) abolished the concept of a voidable marriage.

== Void v. voidable marriage ==
A void marriage is regarded for all legal purposes as no marriage at all. On the other hand, a voidable marriage was considered a valid marriage until it was annulled by a judicial decree of nullity.

== Legislation ==
Under the Matrimonial Causes Act 1959 (Cth.) (repealed by the FLA) a marriage was voidable on one of four grounds. Section 21(1) of the Act provided:

"A marriage that takes place after the commencement of this Act, not being a marriage that is void, is voidable, where, at the time of the marriage:

(a) either party to the marriage is incapable of consummating the marriage;

(b) either party to the marriage is:

(i) of unsound mind; or
(ii) a mental defective;

(c) either party to the marriage is suffering from a venereal disease in a communicable form; or

(d) the wife is pregnant by a person other than the husband,

and not otherwise."

== Current status ==
Under the Family Law Act 1975 (Cth.) an annulment can now only be granted if a marriage is void. This Act abolished prospectively voidable marriages.

== See also ==
- Marriage in Australia
