= Irreconcilable differences =

Legal concept

Irreconcilable differences is a legal term meaning deep disagreements between spouses that cause a permanent breakdown of the marriage and cannot be resolved. It serves as the primary ground for a no-fault divorce in many jurisdictions. The concept of irreconcilable differences provides possible grounds for divorce in the United States and Australia, among other jurisdictions.

== Australia ==
Australian family law uses a no-fault divorce approach, and irreconcilable differences is the sole grounds for divorce, with adequate proof being that the estranged couple have been separated for more than 12 months.

== United States ==
In the United States, this is one of several possible grounds. Often, it is used as justification for a no-fault divorce. In many cases, irreconcilable differences were the original and only grounds for no-fault divorce, such as in California, which enacted America's first purely no-fault divorce law in 1969. California now lists one other possible basis, "permanent legal incapacity to make decisions" (formerly "incurable insanity"), on its divorce petition form.

Any sort of difference between the two parties that either cannot or will not be changed can be considered an irreconcilable difference, including differences in character, personality, belief, or some other personality trait. Some states use the terms irremediable breakdown, irretrievable breakdown, or incompatibility. In states where the official grounds is 'irreconcilable differences', the statutory definition of that term may include a waiting period or a mutual-consent requirement.
