= Polygamy in Australia =

Legal status of marriage to more than one person in Australia

Polygamy is not legally recognised in Australia. Legally recognised polygamous marriages may not be performed in Australia, and a person who marries another person, knowing that the previous marriage is still subsisting, commits an offence of bigamy under section 94 of the Marriage Act 1961, which carries a maximum penalty of 5 years imprisonment. However, the offence of bigamy only applies to attempts to contract a legally recognised marriage; it does not apply to polygamous marriages where there is no attempt to gain recognition for the marriage under Australian law. Whether or not either or both partners were aware of the previous subsisting marriage, the second marriage is void. Foreign polygamous marriages are not recognized in Australia. However, a foreign marriage that is not polygamous but could potentially become polygamous at a later date under the law of the country where the marriage took place is recognized in Australia while any subsequent polygamous marriage is not. While under Australian law a person can be in at most one legally valid marriage at a time, Australian law does recognise that a person can be in multiple de facto relationships concurrently, and as such entitled to the legal rights extended to members of de facto relationships.

In 2008, Australia's then Attorney General Robert McClelland said that "There is absolutely no way that the government will be recognising polygamist relationships. They are unlawful and they will remain as such. Under Australian law, marriage is defined as the union of a man and woman to the exclusion of all others. Polygamous marriage necessarily offends this definition." (Subsequently, the Marriage Amendment (Definition and Religious Freedoms) Act 2017 changed the legal definition from "the union of a man and a woman" to "the union of two persons".) Former High Court Judge, the Hon. Michael Kirby said in 2012, "Human relationships are complicated, but these, I would respectfully suggest, are issues for the future".

Section 6 of the Family Law Act 1975 provides for recognition of polygamous marriages, entered in to outside Australia, for the purposes of proceedings under this Act.

== Family Court ruling ==
On 4 March 2016, the Full Court of the Family Court of Australia ruled in the case Ghazel & Ghazel and Anor that a polygamous marriage is illegal in Australia but a foreign marriage, which is ‘potentially polygamous’ when it is entered into, will be recognised as a valid marriage in Australia. A marriage is ‘potentially polygamous’ if it is not polygamous but the law in the country where the original marriage took place allows a polygamous marriage of one or both partners to the original marriage at a later date. The court also ruled that if the husband took a second wife, the second marriage would not be legally recognised while the husband was still married to his first wife. It is worth noting that this was the opposite holding to the classic English case Hyde v. Hyde, which found that a marriage under laws which permit polygamy would not be recognised under English law (however, the common law of marriage has been since extinguished by legislation, which is why the decision in Hyde is not directly relevant to contemporary Australian law).

=== Social security ===
Australian social security law recognises that multiple partners are assessed exactly the same as any other person, with no additional payments for having multiple partners.

== Prevalence ==
=== Indigenous communities ===
Polygamous relationships exist within some indigenous communities.

=== Islamic communities ===
A small number of Islamist leaders advocated the legalisation of polygamous marriages in Australia, which stirred controversial and emotional debate. According to an SBS, Insight program seeking to answer the question, "How common is polygamy in Australia?" despite the stereotype of a Muslim having up to four wives, polygamy in the Islamic world is quite rare, and it is even rarer in Australia. Proponents of polygamy have claimed that legalisation would "protect the rights of women," while opponents have claimed that it would "endanger the Australian way of life."

=== General community ===
In the 2012 Sydney Gay and Lesbian Mardi Gras which was themed "universal and infinite love", the polyamory float featured a, "huge retro style rocket ship". The 2014 Mardi Gras hosted the, "Polyamory Sydney ‘Birds of a Feather, love together’ – the infinite love Nest".

In 2013, the 'Polyamory Action Lobby' submitted a petition to federal parliament saying, "For too long has Australia denied people the right to marry the ones they care about. We find this abhorrent. We believe that everyone should be allowed to marry their partners, and that the law should never be a barrier to love. And that's why we demand nothing less than the full recognition of polyamorous families."

In 2014 and 2015 further recognition for, and acceptance of, polygamy was sought.

A number of Australian Facebook sites are dedicated to polyamory, including 'Sydney Polyamory' and 'Poly Mardi Gras Float'. Others are dedicated to polygamy, including a website set up to assist men in finding a second wife reported to have 750 Australian members.

The functioning of monogamish and throuple relationships are being explored. Concern has been raised with both redefining relationships as, "primarily about adult desire".

== See also ==
- Group marriage
- Marriage in Australia
- Monogamy
- Polygamy
