= Family Law Legislation Amendment (Family Violence and Other Measures) Act 2011 =

Australian Act of Parliament

Family Law Legislation Amendment Act

Parliament of Australia
- Long title: An Act to consolidate statutes relating to Family Law.
- Assented to: 7 December 2011
- Status: Current legislation

The Family Law Legislation Amendment (Family Violence and Other Measures) Act 2011 is an act of the Australian Parliament that amends the Family Law Act 1975. It has four parts and its main amendments involve how courts define and respond to allegations of child abuse and domestic violence.

== Origins ==
The Family Law Legislation Amendment Act 2011 was introduced to the Australian Parliament on 24 March 2011 and came into effect on 7 June 2012. It was implemented in an attempt to respond to the criticisms of the Family Law Amendment (Shared Parental Responsibility) Act 2006 by the Australian Institute of Family Studies, Professor Richard Chisholm and Family Law Council, who all conducted inquiries into the 2006 Act. Professor Chisholm's "Family Courts Violence Review" concluded that the 2006 Family Law Amendment Act's introduction of a shared parental responsibility provision had been misinterpreted by courts and parents as a provision for equal shared care time and had led to parents considering only "their own entitlements rather than what was best for their children". Further, the Australian Institute of Family Studies inquiry "Evaluation of the 2006 family law reforms" suggested that the friendly parent provisions had increased the likelihood of a child remaining with a family member who exposed them to family violence. Charles Pragnell from the National Council for Children Post-Separation argued that this occurred as the provision led to "mothers remain[ing] silent about domestic violence" and judges "seeing the right of shared care as the principle overriding consideration...giving custody of children to convicted pedophiles and violent offenders". Based on these inquiries, the Australian Law Reform Commission called for the 2006 act to be amended. This led to the implementation of the Family Law Legislation Amendment Act in 2011.

== Major features ==
The Family Law Legislation Amendment Act 2011 contains two schedules: "Schedule 1- Amendments relating to family violence" and "Schedule 2- Other amendments", which are each divided into two further parts.

=== New definitions ===
Schedule 1 of the Family Law Legislation Amendment Act 2011 redefined both family violence and child abuse. It redefined family violence to include "controlling actions" and removed the condition that a person must "reasonably" fear for their personal security. In section 4AB it redefined family violence as "violent, threatening or other behaviour by a person that coerces or controls a member of the person’s family (the family member), or causes the family member to be fearful". Further, the Act provided an extensive but not exhaustive list of instances of family violence in its new sub-section 4AB(2), which include instances of stalking and repeated derogatory taunts. It also specifies that exposure to family violence occurs when a child sees of hears family violence and listed examples of possible situations of exposure. In redefining child abuse, the Family Law Legislation Amendment Act 2011 listed two new categories of behaviour that constitute as abuse; serious neglect and actions that cause serious physiological harm.

=== Primary consideration ===
The Family Law Amendment Act 2006 introduced the provision that equal shared responsibility for both parents is the optimal interest of the child. This was based on two of the child's rights, first, their right to have an ongoing relationship with both of their parents and, second, the child's right to be safe from abuse and harm. In subsection 60CC(2) the Family Law Legislation Amendment Act 2011 included a provision that if a conflict arises between the two primary best interest considerations, the requirement to ensure a child is safe from harm should be prioritised over the concern for a child's relationship with both parents. This meant that the requirement that a child be protected from abuse became the primary consideration of the court.

=== Removal of the friendly parent provision ===
The Family Law Amendment Act 2006 included a provision that required the court to consider how supportive each child's parents were of a supporting an ongoing relationship between their child and the other parent when determining what is best for the child, referred to as the "friendly parent provision" by legal practitioners. The Family Law Legislation Amendment Act 2011 removed this provision from the consideration of the court.

=== Firmer guidelines for dealing with family violence ===
The Family Law Legislation Amendment Act 2011 introduced new provision that the court, legal practitioners, and others must comply with when dealing with the prospect or reality of family violence allegations. These provisions include the requirement that if any party is aware than the child has been the subject of a notification, report, investigation, inquiry or assessment relating to child abuse they must inform the court. Further, the Act specifies that the court must expressly ask all parties in the court if they are aware of or concerned about abuse of the child by their guardians or family members.

== Significant cases ==
=== Martin v Martin ===
In the case Martin v Martin [2014] FCCA 2838 the 2011 Family Law Legislation Amendment Act's expansion of the definition of family violence to include repeated stalking meant that the court granted sole parental responsibility to the mother and prevented the father from going to the child's school or home. The court stated that the father's actions of repeatedly calling the mother late a night, honking his car outside her home and arriving at her children's activities without warning constituted as an "ongoing campaign" of stalking. It found that this behaviour was undertaken with the intent to control and intimidate the mother. The judge concluded that as the Act states that the need to protect a child from harm is the priority of the Family Court and stalking constitutes as family violence the father should be denied access to his children.

=== Oakes v Oakes ===
In the case Oakes v Oakes [2014] FamCA 285 the 2011 Family Law Legislation Amendment Act's elevation of the provision that a child be protected from harm to primary consideration resulted in the court granting sole parental responsibility to the mother. The case concerned a three-year-old whose mother was seeking sole parental responsibility and an arrangement where the father would have no contact with his daughter while the father desired a shared time arrangement. Under the Act, the court was required to ask if any party held the belief that the daughter was at risk of abuse. By doing so it was revealed that the father had "made clear and unambiguous threats to kill the mother" and had been domestically abusive before, during and after the separation. The judge argued that the father presented "an unacceptable risk to the child" and cited the "need to protect the child from harm" as the main reason he granted sole responsibility to the mother, banning the father from any contact.

=== Tindall v Saldo ===
In the case Tindall v Saldo [2015] FamCAFC the 2011 Family Law Legislation Amendment Act's removal of the "friendly parent provision" in section 60CC(3) of the Family Law Amendment Act 2006 resulted in the Family Court considering the mother's attempts to prohibit a continued relationship between her child and its father as "protective in nature". The mother had appealed against the Family Court's initial decision that she disobeyed court orders, by preventing her child from having supervised time with the father, without a "reasonable excuse". However, in the appeal the court argued that, as this breach occurred while the father was undergoing a criminal trial for domestic and sexual abuse that created a "palpable change in the underlying family dynamic", the mother had acted out of a desire to protect the child from harm. The court claimed that the mother's two day testimony and the father's guilty plea provided reasonable grounds for the mother to have believed she needed to separate the child from its father and that based on the removal of the "friendly parent provision" the court's priority should not be the efforts made by each parent to ensure a continued relationship between their child and the other parent. Hence, the original judgment was set aside.

== Influence ==
=== Australian Institute of Family Studies Review ===
In a survey of over 315 lawyers, conducted by the Australian Institute of Family Studies, the percentage of family law lawyers who agreed that "the family violence reforms have benefitted children in most cases" increased from 29.5% to 48.3% between 2008 and 2014. During that time the Family Law Legislation Amendment Act was the only family violence reform. Further, the percentage of family law lawyers who believe the reforms "have resulted in fewer children in shared care arrangements where there is high conflict" has increased from 16% to 42.5% in the same time period. The review by the Australian Institute of Family Studies approved of the amendment that made the need to protect children from harm the Family Court's primary considerations, as did 86% of the respondents surveyed, respondents included parents who had dealt with family courts, legal practitioners, lawyers and judges. There was less consensus among respondents on whether "protection from harm is accorded greater weight when relevant" in the Family Courts, only 70% of the respondents agreed.

=== Australian Law Reform Commission ===
The Australian Law Reform Commission has critiqued the 2011 Family Law Legislation Amendment Act's failure to address its two of its major recommendations, first, the removal of the mandatory attendance of both parents at Family Dispute Resolution Services and, second, the introduction of a clarification that equal shared parental responsibility does not refer to equal time. Under the Family Law Amendment Act 2006, a court requires a certificate of attendance from Family Dispute Resolution Services that states both parents attended a compulsory mediation session before it can hear a case relating to the custody of a child. While there are exemptions for cases with accusations of family violence, the Australian Law Reform Commission stated in its inquiry into the 2006 Family Law Amendment Act that the family dispute resolution process is "weighted heavily" against women, particularly those who have been victims of domestic abuse, leading to women being "manipulated into agreeing with unjust settlements". The 2006 Family Law Amendment Act also includes a specification that the presumption of shared parental responsibility means the Family Court is obliged "to consider" implementing a custody arrangement that grants both parents equal time or "substantial and significant time", which has been critiqued by the Australian Law Reform Commission and was not amended in the 2011 Family Law Legislation Amendment Act. The Australian Law Reform Commission has claimed that this specification has created "widespread misunderstanding", leading parents to believe that children must spend equal or significant time with both parents. Child protection campaigner Emeritus Professor Freda Briggs has stated that the child being protected from harm "must be elevated to the single primary and paramount consideration", otherwise the "risk of ongoing exposure to domestic violence" will remain.

== Proposed reform ==
On 31 August 2018 the Family Law Amendment (Family Violence and Other Measures) Act 2018 received its royal assent. The 2018 Act removed the twenty-one day time limit on the "revival, variation or suspension of family law orders by state and territory courts" in cases involving family violence and specified that a court needn't give an explanation of an order or injunction to a child if receiving such an explanation is not in the child's best interest. On 20 May 2018 the Attorney-General Christian Porter announced that the Family Court and Federal Circuit Court will be combined in order to reduce the, on average, "year and a half" wait for families to get their cases heard by a judge. Rick O’Brien, the chair of Family Law Section of the Law Council of Australia, has described this wait as a "crisis" that "drastically increases the likelihood of a child being exposed to family violence" . The Australian Government estimates that by combining the two courts an extra 8,000 cases will be completed each year. There doesn't currently exist proposed reform that addresses the concerns listed by the Australian Law Reform Commission (see Influence section).

== See also ==
- Australian family law
- Divorce in Australia
