= Marriage certificate =

Official statement that two people have been married

A marriage certificate (colloquially marriage lines) is an official statement that two people are married to each other. In most jurisdictions, a marriage certificate is issued by a government official only after the civil registration of the marriage after application by one of the parties and the payment of a fee.

In some jurisdictions, especially in the United States, a marriage certificate is the official record that two people have undertaken a marriage ceremony. This includes jurisdictions where marriage licenses do not exist. In other jurisdictions, a marriage license serves a dual purpose of granting permission for a marriage to take place and then endorsing the same document to record the fact that the marriage has been performed.

A marriage certificate may be required for a number of purposes. It may be required as evidence of change of a party's name, on issues of legitimacy of a child, during divorce proceedings, or as part of a genealogical history, besides other purposes.

== Australia ==
Though marriage in Australia is regulated under federal law, the registration of marriages takes place under the respective state or territory laws, generally through an agency named "Registry of Births, Deaths and Marriages" or similar, and marriage certificates are issued by these agencies. Under Federal law, a certificate is issued at the time of marriage by a celebrant, for forwarding to the state or territory registry. A similar (sometimes cut-down) document is often given to the couple on the day of the marriage, it is generally handwritten. While legally valid as proof of marriage, is not generally acceptable as an official document. However, the state or territory marriage certificate is considered to be an acceptable and secure secondary identity document especially for the purposes of change of name, and needs to be obtained separately for a fee generally some time after the marriage. This document can be verified electronically by the Attorney-general of Australia's Document Verification Service. States and territories sometimes market commemorative marriage certificates, which generally have no official document status.

State and territory issued certificates are on A4 paper and provide: Date and place of marriage, full names, occupations, addresses, marital status (never validly married, divorced, widow/er), birth date and place, age, father's name, mother's maiden name of each the couple, the celebrant, witness names (generally two), the registrar official of the state or territory authority, and the date of registration. The registrar's signature and seal is printed/embossed on the certificate along with a number, and date of issue of certificate.

Marriage certificates are not generally used in Australia, other than to prove change-of-name, and proof of marital status in a divorce hearing. Some visa categories require a certificate (where a partner is to be associated with a primary applicant), however there are similar categories of partner visas that do not.

Since 2018, Australian federal law has recognized same-sex marriages. These marriages are registrable and documented in a conventional way.

== United Kingdom ==
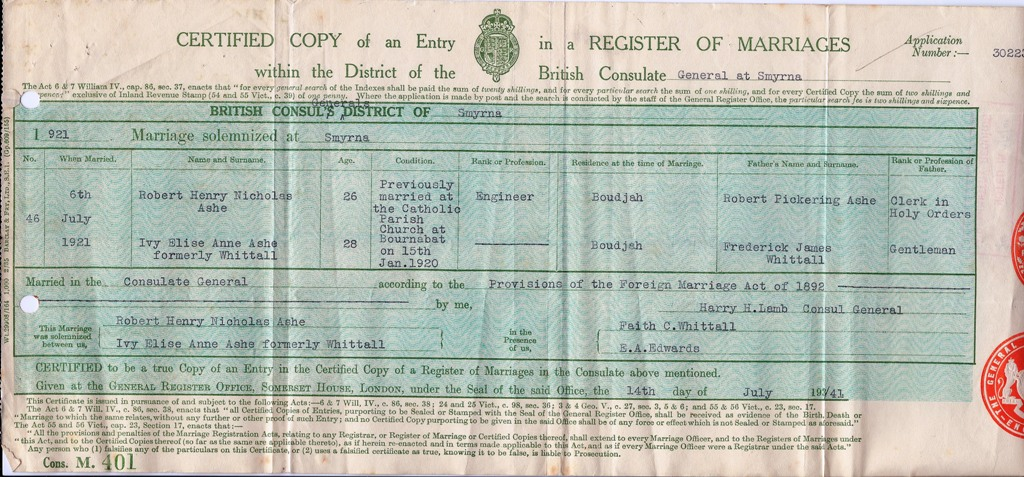
A British consular marriage certificate, issued by the General Register Office for England and Wales under the provisions of the Foreign Marriage Act 1892.

=== England and Wales ===
A marriage certificate is given to a couple who have married. Until the introduction of electronic registration of marriages in May 2021, copies were made in two registers: one was retained by the church or register office; the other, when the entire register is full, was sent to the superintendent registrar of the registration district. Every quarter, the minister or civil registrar prepared a further copy of all the marriage entries and sent them to the Registrar General.

The certificate lists the date of the marriage, and the full names of both spouses. Their ages are included (it is also permissible to write "full", meaning of age, and until 1850 some 75% of certificates said that; if the certificate reads "minor" or "under age", it means that, until 1929 when the law changed to 16, the bride was between 12 and 20 and the groom 14 and 20 years of age).

The certificate does not contain a specific record of the intended new surname(s), if one or both spouses wish to change their name. However, if one spouse wishes to take his or her spouse's surname, a marriage certificate obtained in England or Wales is sufficient evidence for getting the name changed on a British passport, bank accounts, and other purposes. Either spouse may adopt the surname of the other, or they may join their surnames together.

The certificate also records the previous marital status of both spouses. Those not previously married were "bachelor" or "spinster." From 1858 to 1952 a previously divorced groom was listed as "the divorced husband of…" with his ex-wife's maiden name listed, and vice versa for a divorced bride. The currently used wording is "previous marriage dissolved" with no further details given. On 5 September 2005, the Registrar General in England and Wales officially abolished the traditional terms of "bachelor" and "spinster" and substituted "single" to coincide with the reform that introduced civil partnerships, explaining, "The word single will be used to mean a couple who has never been through a marriage or civil partnership."

==== Origins of the system ====
On 1 July 1837, civil registration was introduced in England and Wales, providing a central record of all births, deaths, and marriages. A Registrar General was appointed with overall responsibility and the country was divided into registration districts, each controlled by a superintendent registrar. Under this system, all marriage ceremonies have been certified by the issuing of a marriage certificate whose details are also stored centrally. From that date onward, marriage ceremonies could be performed, and certificates issued either by a clergyman of the Church of England, in a parish church, or by a civil registrar in a civil register office. Marriages performed according to the ceremonies of Quakers and Jews also continued to be recognised as legal marriages, and certificates were issued.

== Russia ==
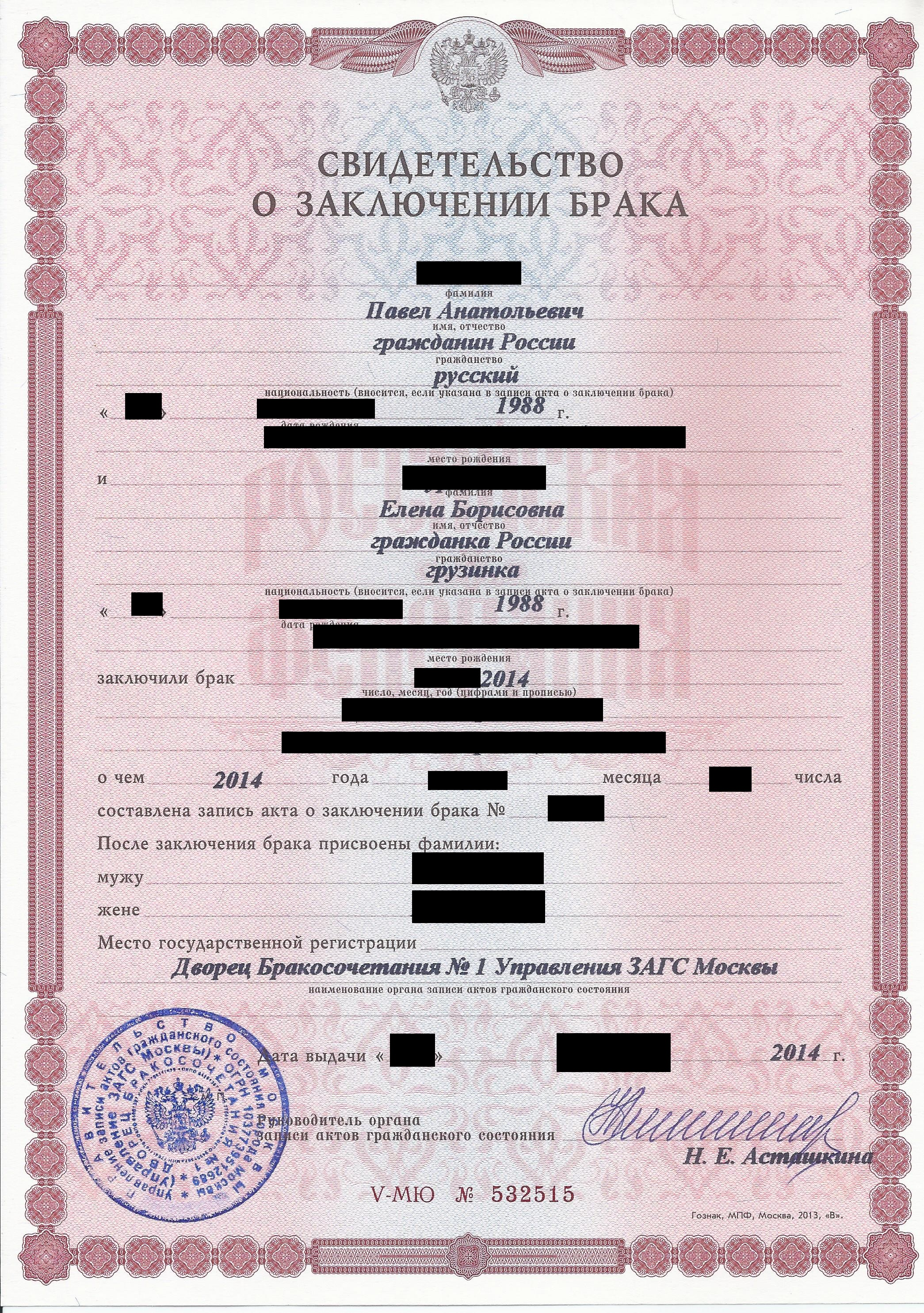
A Russian marriage certificate, issued 2014.

A certificate of marriage is the only legally valid document on the registration of marriage in Russia. Issued in the certification of the fact of state registration of the civil status act, signed by the head of the registry office and is sealed with its seal.

A state registration fee of 350 rubles is charged for state registration of acts of civil status.

For the marriage, the couple must file a joint statement confirming mutual voluntary consent for the conclusion of the marriage union, as well as the absence of circumstances preventing marriage. Future spouses sign a joint statement and indicate the date of its compilation. Simultaneously with the application it is necessary to provide documents proving the identity of future spouses; documents confirming the termination of the previous marriage, if any; permission to enter into marriage before reaching the marriageable age, if the person (person) entering into marriage is a minor.

The certificate of marriage contains the following information:

- Surname (before and after the marriage), name, patronymic, date and place of birth, citizenship and nationality (if indicated in the record of the act of marriage) of each of the persons married
- Date of marriage
- Date of compilation and the number of the record of the marriage certificate
- Place of state registration of marriage, namely the name of the registry office chosen by future spouses at will in the territory of the Russian Federation
- Date of issue of the marriage certificate

== United States ==
In parts of the United States, the certificate of marriage is recorded on the same document as the marriage license or application for marriage. While each state creates their own form for use with the recording of marriages, most states have a specific portion of the record to be completed by the official performing the ceremony.

In some states, such as Nevada, this portion also includes places for the parties to indicate a change in name, if any. If it does not, the marriage certificate can be used as documentation to justify a legal name change but not as proof that a name change has occurred. If there is no place for a change of name to be recorded, the name is changed as requested on government documents with proof of marriage. In Alabama since 2019, only a marriage certificate is required to be completed by the couple and notarized by two notaries public, with an Alabama judge being legally required to accept the certificate as valid.

=== Confidential marriages ===
In California, under Section 501 of the state's Family Code, a county clerk is authorised to issue a confidential marriage licence and subsequently grant a confidential marriage certificate; Section 511 of the same Code states that the records of marriages registered under this provision are not open to public inspection, except by an order of the court. This practice originated in 1878, and was originally intended for those persons in a common-law relationship who presented themselves as married and wanted to make such marriage official. The practice of confidential marriages is unique to California, and is only approximated by Michigan, which offers court-ordered secret marriages.

=== Consular marriages ===
Prior to 1989, the U.S. Department of State offered a Certificate of Witness to Marriage (form FS-97) for those couples whose marriages were solemnised in the presence of a consular official overseas. This was authorised by 22 U.S.C. 4192 on the condition that the parties had to be free to contract marriage under the laws of the District of Columbia. On 9 November 1989, this provision of the United States Code was repealed, and the department accordingly ceased issuing such certificates.

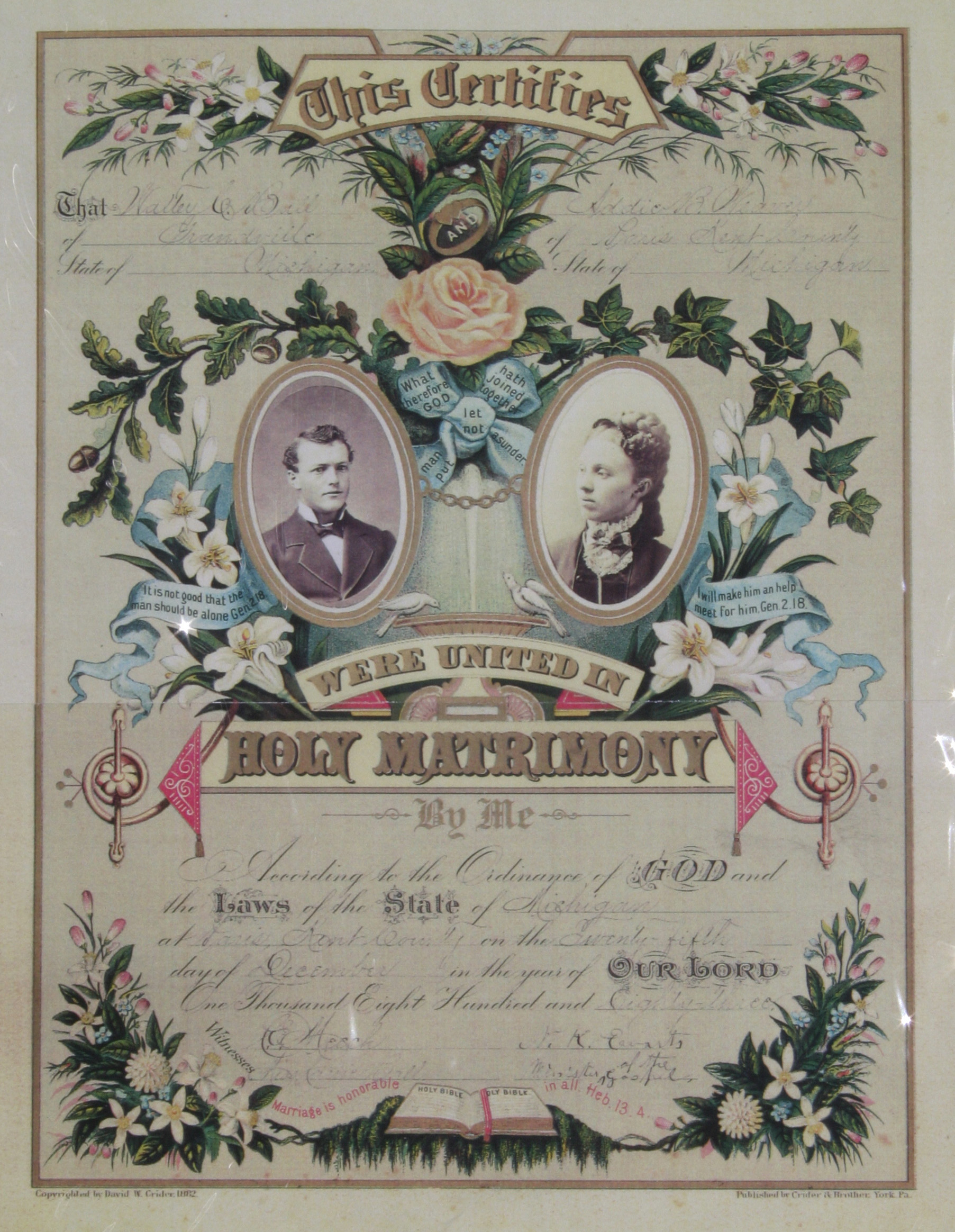
A Michigan marriage certificate, issued 1883.

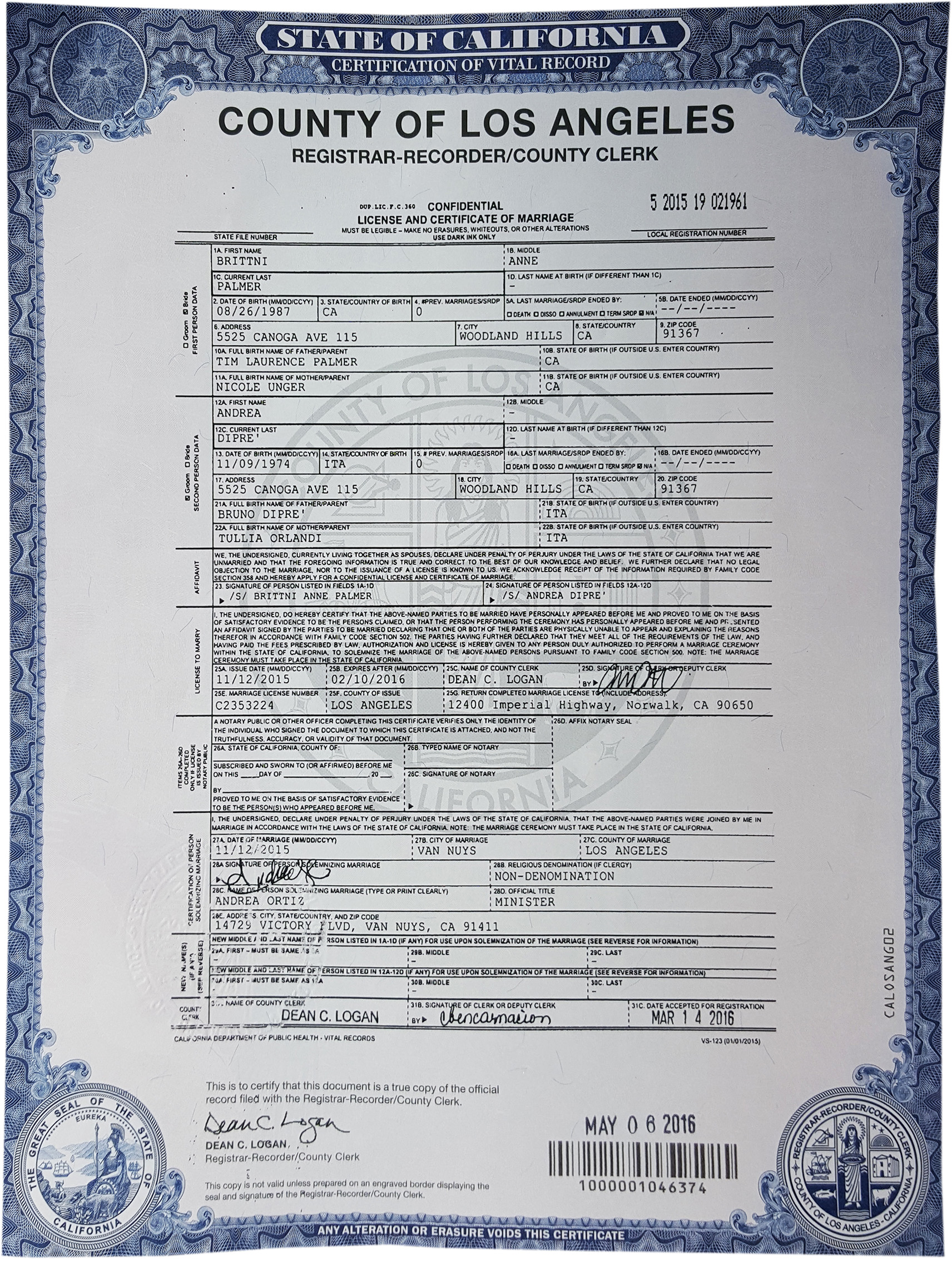
A California confidential marriage certificate, issued 2015.

A State Department certificate of witness to marriage, issued 1948.

== India ==
In India, marriage registration is a legal mandate, though its actual implication is different when it comes to practice. In Seema v. Ashwani Kumar, the Supreme Court ordered all States and Union Territories to ensure that marriages are registered compulsorily, so that child marriage, bigamy, fraud, and Women's exploitation could be prevented.

On this issue, the courts further declared that marriage which is performed under personal law is valid and does not become invalid due to non-registration. The non-registration, however, usually results in very difficult situations when it comes to proving the marriage. In summary, registration does not establish the marriage but rather enforces and increases one's legal rights.

The Court Marriage Certificate (CMC) legally identifies two adults as successfully married. In India, the CMC has been issued under the Special Marriage Act, which means that the marriage has been registered with the Government and was created without the need for any religious ceremony, and the Special Marriage Act applies equally to all citizens of India.
