= Hyde v Hyde =

Landmark case of the English Court of Probate and Divorce

Hyde v Hyde and Woodmansee
- Court: Court of Probate and Divorce
- Decided: 20 March 1866
- Citation: {L.R.} 1 P. & D. 130

Court membership
- Judge sitting: Lord Penzance

Keywords
- polygamy, marriage

Hyde v Hyde is a landmark case of the English Court of Probate and Divorce. The case was heard on 20 March 1866 before Lord Penzance, and established the common law definition of marriage. The case clearly spelled out the characteristics of marriage, such as a voluntary union involving one woman and one man for life and 'to the exclusion of all others'. However, it fails to confine the "juristic" or constitutional idea of marriage, giving a broad definition of marriage.

== Facts of the case ==
John Hyde, an English Mormon who had been ordained to the priesthood of the Church of Jesus Christ of Latter-day Saints (LDS Church), brought an action of divorce against his wife, Lavinia, for adultery. He had left the LDS Church and began to write and publish anti-Mormon material, a move that caused him to be excommunicated from the LDS Church. His wife left him, and subsequently remarried in Utah Territory, which was the basis for his suit for divorce. The court denied his petition on the grounds that the relationship he had entered into did not constitute a marriage under the law of England.

== Judgement ==
Citing Warrender v Warrender, Lord Penzance found that institutions in foreign countries (including marriage) cannot be considered valid under English law, unless they resemble the equivalent English institution. With respect to marriage, English law could therefore not recognise either polygamy or concubinage as marriage. Similarly, he found that cultural traditions of which the court had no knowledge could not form the basis for a court decision. The court dismissed John Hyde's claim.

The case established the common law definition of marriage. Lord Penzance stated:

I conceive that marriage, as understood in Christendom, may for this purpose be defined as the voluntary union for life of one man and one woman, to the exclusion of all others.

== Significance ==
This definition has been an influential consideration in a number of recent landmark decisions, including Same-Sex Marriage, Ghaidan v Godin-Mendoza, Wilkinson v. Kitzinger and Others and the ACT Same Sex Marriage case in Australia. In addition, the phraseology has had a direct influence on numerous pieces of legislation, including the Civil Partnership Act 2004 (UK), the Matrimonial Causes Act 1973 (UK), the Marriage (Scotland) Act 1977, and the Australian Marriage Act 1961.

Since 2014, when the Marriage (Same Sex Couples) Act 2013 (UK) came into force allowing same-sex marriages in England and Wales, the common-law definition of marriage is now moot, as did the 2017 amendment to the Australian Marriage Act 1961 by Marriage Amendment (Definition and Religious Freedoms) Act 2017.

== Criticism ==
The heavy reliance on Lord Penzance's definition of marriage has been criticised on two distinct grounds. First, the original statement was an obiter dictum, meaning it did not establish a binding precedent. Second, this dictum was a defence of marriage and not a definition of it.

== See also ==
- Corbett v Corbett
- Legal status of polygamy
- List of polygamy court cases
