= Marriage Amendment (Definition and Religious Freedoms) Act 2017 =

2017 Australian law legalising same-sex marriage

Parliament of Australia
- Long title: An Act to amend the law relating to the definition of marriage and protect religious freedoms, and for related purposes
- Citation: Marriage Amendment (Definition and Religious Freedoms) Act 2017 (Cth) (No. 129, 2017)
- Territorial extent: Australia
- Passed by: Senate
- Passed: 29 November 2017
- Passed by: House of Representatives
- Passed: 7 December 2017
- Royal assent: 8 December 2017
- Commenced: 9 December 2017
- Administered by: Attorney-General's Department

Legislative history

Initiating chamber: Senate
- Bill title: Marriage Amendment (Definition and Religious Freedoms) Bill 2017
- Introduced by: Dean Smith
- First reading: 15 November 2017
- Second reading: 28 November 2017
- Third reading: 29 November 2017

Revising chamber: House of Representatives
- Member(s) in charge: Warren Entsch
- First reading: 4 December 2017
- Second reading: 7 December 2017
- Third reading: 7 December 2017

Amends
- Marriage Act 1961 (No. 12, 1961)

Summary
- Legalises marriage for same-sex couples

Keywords
- Same-sex marriage
- Status: In force

The Marriage Amendment (Definition and Religious Freedoms) Act 2017 (Cth) is an act of the Parliament of Australia, which legalises same-sex marriage in Australia by amending the Marriage Act 1961 to allow marriage between two persons of marriageable age, regardless of their gender.

Introduced as a private member's bill by Western Australian senator Dean Smith of the Liberal Party following the Australian Marriage Law Postal Survey, the bill passed the Parliament on 7 December 2017. It received royal assent on the following day and came into effect on 9 December 2017.

== Background ==
Same-sex marriage legislation had been presented to the Parliament of Australia on 22 occasions between September 2004 and May 2017, though on each occasion the legislation failed to pass either the House of Representatives or the Senate. These attempts followed the Howard government's 2004 amendment to the Marriage Act 1961 which explicitly defined marriage as a union between only a man and a woman and banned the recognition of same-sex marriages conducted lawfully in foreign jurisdictions. Prior to the legalisation of same-sex marriage, same-sex relationships could only be treated as de facto unions under federal law. These unions provide couples with most, though not all, of the legal rights of marriage, although those rights may be difficult to assert and are not always recognised in practice.

=== Postal survey ===
The Malcolm Turnbull-led Liberal/National government went to the July 2016 federal election promising to put the issue of same-sex marriage to a national vote, in the form of a plebiscite. Despite narrowly winning the election, the government could not pass the legislation to establish the plebiscite in the Senate and so eventually decided to conduct a voluntary postal survey of all Australians on the electoral roll. Prime Minister Malcolm Turnbull pledged the government would facilitate the passage of a private member's bill in the event of a "Yes" result in favour of same-sex marriage, which occurred when the results of the survey were announced by the Australian Bureau of Statistics on 15 November 2017.

=== Dean Smith bill ===
On the day the postal results were released, Liberal Party Senator Dean Smith, an openly gay backbencher in the government, introduced the Marriage Amendment (Definition and Religious Freedoms) Bill 2017 into the Senate. Smith's bill had been publicly released earlier in August, during the midst of a divisive internal effort in the Liberal Party to change policy and vote on same-sex marriage legislation without conducting a national vote.

The bill itself was the result of a cross-party effort following the reporting of a Senate committee in February 2017 which investigated how a same-sex marriage law with religious freedoms incorporated in it might operate.

Several months later, Smith published a draft of the bill which would later be the one to be introduced to the Parliament in November. The bill was formally introduced into the Parliament and read for a first time on 15 November 2017. Chief among the bill's reforms is the amendment of the definition of the word "marriage" in the Marriage Act, replacing "a man and a woman" with "a union of 2 people", as well as the repeal of Section 88EA of the Act, which bans the recognition of same-sex marriages lawfully entered into in foreign jurisdictions. This means that same-sex couples who married in foreign jurisdictions automatically have their marriages recognised in Australia. In accordance with the recommendation of the Senate committee report, the bill creates a new category of marriage celebrants in Australia, the "religious marriage celebrant", who is protected from being required to solemnise any marriage. Additionally, religious bodies and organisations established for a religious purpose are exempt from being required to provide facilities or goods or services for a marriage ceremony that conflicts with their faith.

The terminology in the bill, specifically the wording "2 people" with respect to the definition of "marriage", alleviates the concerns of several transgender and intersex rights organisations. These groups had expressed concern in the past that a same-sex marriage bill might not include this terminology, but rather only mention "same-sex" marriage, potentially prolonging the inability of some intersex and transgender people to marry. This had been a concern expressed when the Australian Capital Territory drafted a same-sex marriage law in 2013. The bill addresses these concerns by defining marriage in Australia in gender neutral terms; "the union of 2 people".

Though introduced by Smith, the bill was co-sponsored by eight other senators; Linda Reynolds (Liberal), Penny Wong (Labor), Louise Pratt (Labor), Richard Di Natale (Greens), Janet Rice (Greens), Skye Kakoschke-Moore (Nick Xenophon Team), Derryn Hinch (Justice Party) and Jane Hume (Liberal).

=== Proposed amendments ===
There was some unresolved disagreement by politicians who advocated for a "No" result in the postal survey as to whether further religious protections should be added to the Smith bill as an amendment at this time or whether a later bill for this purpose should be considered. In the Senate, several politicians sought to incorporate amendments designed to further religious, conscientious and other protections, in areas relating to marriages, classrooms and organisations. All such amendments were rejected by the Senate. Similar amendments were sought by government MPs Andrew Hastie and Michael Sukkar in the House of Representatives, such as including two definitions of marriage (both man-woman marriage and two-person marriage) and expanding exemptions from anti-discrimination laws for religious organisations and conscientious objectors. All such amendments were also similarly rejected by the House of Representatives.

== The act ==
Schedule 1 – Part 1:

- Sets out objectives of the bill.
- Amends the definition of "authorised celebrant" to include a minister of a registered religion, a person authorised to solemnise marriages, a marriage celebrant, religious marriage celebrant, and chaplain or officer other than a chaplain authorised by the Chief of the Defence Force to solemnise marriages.
- Omits the phrase "a man and a woman" from the definition of "marriage" and substitutes "2 people". Also makes an identical change with respect to the requirement of a celebrant to state the nature of a lawful marriage in Australia.
- Makes revisions to the laws relating to establishment of religious marriage celebrants and their rights and obligations and makes general provisions relating to all marriage celebrants.
- Establishes that ministers of religion, religious marriage celebrants and bodies established for religious purposes may refuse to make facilities available or provide goods or services for a marriage ceremony.
- Repeals section of the Act (88EA) which banned the recognition of same-sex marriages lawfully solemnised in foreign jurisdictions.

Schedule 1 – Part 2:

- Amends the Sex Discrimination Act 1984 to establish that a minister of religion, religious marriage celebrant and chaplain may refuse to solemnise a marriage irrespective of other provisions in the Act.

Schedule 1 – Part 3:

- Makes minor, technical amendments to the Marriage Act which go into effect only if Schedule 9 to the Civil Law and Justice Legislation Amendment Act 2017 is not yet in effect by the date of this bill's commencement.

Schedule 1 – Part 4:

- Amends the Marriage Act to create a list of people who are religious marriage celebrants and the religious body or organisation to which they belong. Commenced on 26 October 2018.

Schedule 1 – Part 5:

- Establishes that marriages of same-sex couples lawfully entered into in foreign jurisdictions, prior to the commencement of this bill, are recognised as valid in Australia.
- Clarifies that for the purpose of this bill, "Australia" includes the external territories.

Schedule 2:

- Makes additional amendments to the Sex Discrimination Act 1984 so that a state or territory government can no longer impose the requirement of being unmarried in order for a person to request a gender change on a document issued by that state or territory government. It commenced on 9 December 2018 (only provision to commence 1 year after Act goes into effect)

Schedule 3:

- Makes consequential amendments to references to "spouse" and "married couple" in several Commonwealth laws which previously were not gender neutral.

Schedule 4:

- Inserts transitional provisions relating to family law matters, financial agreements, separation declarations and related matters that have been before or were currently before the courts at the time of the bill's commencement.

== Passage ==
=== Senate ===
The bill had its first reading in the Senate on 15 November 2017. The second reading debate on the bill began on 16 November and continued on 27 November. The bill passed the second reading stage without a division being called for on 28 November 2017.

The committee stage was where amendments to the bill were proposed. The committee stage was held on 28 and 29 November. Several amendments to the bill were proposed, though only one package of technical amendments making minor changes to other legislation, proposed by the Attorney-General George Brandis, was approved by the Senate. Following Brandis' amendments being agreed to, Senators Fawcett and Paterson introduced five separate tranches of amendments. The amendments went to a range of issues, including inserting a different definition of "marriage" in the Act, extending legal protections to individuals who hold a "traditional marriage belief", adding a "no-detriments clause" for people who hold a traditional view of marriage (which would supersede state anti-discrimination laws) and legislating for the right of parents to remove their children from classes relating to marriage, among other areas. All of Fawcett and Paterson's amendments were rejected by the Senate. Subsequently, Senator Brandis and Canavan jointly moved two amendments (one to insert the words "nothing in this Act limits the right of any person...to manifest [one's] religion or belief in worship, observance, practice and teaching" and the other to extend a right of conscientious objection to civil celebrants). The Labor Party opposed the first amendment on the basis that it "cherry-picked" elements of the International Covenant on Civil and Political Rights. Both sets of amendments proposed by Brandis and Canavan were rejected by the Senate.

On 29 November, additional amendments were proposed by Senators Hanson, Leyonhjelm and Rice, all of which were rejected by the Senate. The bill, in its amended form, was then agreed to by the Senate in committee.

On 29 November 2017, immediately after the committee stage concluded, the bill proceeded to the third reading and was passed by 43 votes to 12.

Marriage Amendment (Definition and Religious Freedoms) Bill 2017 – Third Reading
Party	Votes for	Votes against	Abstained/Absent
Labor (26)	15: Carol Brown; Catryna Bilyk; Doug Cameron; Kim Carr; Anthony Chisholm; Kimberley Kitching; Sue Lines; Jenny McAllister; Malarndirri McCarthy; Claire Moore; Louise Pratt; Lisa Singh; Anne Urquhart; Murray Watt; Penny Wong	2: Chris Ketter; Helen Polley	9: Jacinta Collins; Sam Dastyari; Pat Dodson; Don Farrell; Alex Gallacher; Katy Gallagher; Gavin Marshall; Deborah O'Neill; Glenn Sterle
Liberal (22)	14: Simon Birmingham; George Brandis (Note: Liberal National Party of Queensland (LNP) member who sits with the Liberal Party); David Bushby; Mathias Cormann; Jonathon Duniam; Mitch Fifield; Anne Ruston; James Paterson; Jane Hume; Ian Macdonald; Marise Payne; Linda Reynolds; Scott Ryan; Dean Smith	3: Concetta Fierravanti-Wells; Eric Abetz; Slade Brockman	5: Michaelia Cash; David Fawcett; James McGrath; Zed Seselja; Arthur Sinodinos
Greens (9)	9: Andrew Bartlett; Richard Di Natale; Sarah Hanson-Young; Nick McKim; Lee Rhiannon; Janet Rice; Jordon Steele-John; Rachel Siewert; Peter Whish-Wilson	–	–
National (5)	1: Nigel Scullion (Note: Country Liberal Party member who sits with the National Party)	3: Matt Canavan (Note: Liberal National Party of Queensland (LNP) member who sits with the National Party); Barry O'Sullivan; John Williams	1: Bridget McKenzie
One Nation (3)	–	1: Brian Burston	2: Pauline Hanson; Peter Georgiou
Xenophon Team (2)	2: Stirling Griff; Rex Patrick	–	–
Justice (1)	1: Derryn Hinch	–	–
Liberal Democrats (1)	1: David Leyonhjelm	–	–
Australian Conservatives (1)	–	1: Cory Bernardi	–
Independents (2)	–	2: Lucy Gichuhi; Fraser Anning	–
Total (72) (Note: There were 4 vacancies in the Senate at the time of the vote due to the ongoing parliamentary eligibility crisis.)	43	12	17

=== House of Representatives ===
The bill was read for a first time in the House of Representatives on 4 December 2017. The bill was introduced into the House by the member for Leichhardt, Warren Entsch.

The second reading debate on the bill began immediately after the bill was read a first time, on 4 December 2017. During the second reading stage, Tony Abbott, the member for Warringah, moved an amendment to the bill which would have inserted the words "whilst not declining to give the bill a second reading, the House notes that it is vital that individuals and entities are not disadvantaged nor suffer any adverse effects as a result of conscientiously holding a particular view of the nature of marriage". Entsch later advised the House that Abbott's motion constituted a wrecking amendment, citing advice from the Clerk that the amendment, if carried, would deny the House an opportunity to consider the bill read a second time and stop any further passage of the bill, unless the House later made substantive action such as suspending standing orders, which would require an absolute majority. In his second reading speech, Abbott conceded that same-sex marriage would be introduced in Australia and said he looked forward to attending his sister's same-sex wedding in 2018. Elsewhere, openly gay MP and same-sex marriage supporter Tim Wilson made history during his second reading speech when he proposed to his partner, Ryan Bolger, who was sitting in the gallery. Bolger accepted Wilson's proposal. It was the first known engagement on the floor of the House of Representatives. The second reading debate continued on 5 and 6 December 2017. On 7 December 2017, the amendment moved by Abbott was rejected by the House and the bill passed the second reading stage, in both cases without a division being called for.

The bill moved to the consideration in detail stage immediately after the second reading was held. All amendments, most of which were moved by government MPs which mirrored the failed Senate amendments, and sought to expand religious and conscientious exemptions to same-sex marriages, were rejected by the House. The bill then passed the consideration in detail stage.

Results by division. Green indicates a Yes vote, red indicates a No vote, dark grey indicates the member abstained, and light grey indicates the member was not present.

The bill then immediately passed the third reading stage. A division on the third reading was called for, but because the number of MPs voting against the bill was less than five, the Speaker, in accordance with the standing orders, simply declared that the question was resolved in the affirmative and formally recorded the votes of only those MPs who voted against the third reading. At least eleven MPs are known to have abstained from the division, by leaving the House before the third reading commenced.

Marriage Amendment (Definition and Religious Freedoms) Bill 2017 – Third Reading in the House of Representatives
Party	Votes for	Votes against	Abstained/Absent
Labor (69)	66	–	3: Anthony Byrne; Brendan O'Connor; Wayne Swan (Absent)
Liberal (58)	47 (Note: Including 12 LNP members who sit with the Liberal Party)	1: Russell Broadbent	10: Tony Abbott; Kevin Andrews; Andrew Hastie; Alex Hawke; Luke Howarth; Bert van Manen; Scott Morrison; Stuart Robert; Michael Sukkar; Rick Wilson
National (16)	11 (Note: Including 3 LNP members who sit with the National Party)	2: David Littleproud; Keith Pitt	3: George Christensen; David Gillespie; Barnaby Joyce
Greens (1)	1: Adam Bandt	–	–
Xenophon Team (1)	1: Rebekha Sharkie	–	–
Katter's Australian (1)	–	1: Bob Katter	–
Independents (2)	2: Cathy McGowan; Andrew Wilkie	–	–
Total (148) (Note: The seat of Bennelong was vacant at the time of the vote due to the ongoing parliamentary eligibility crisis. Liberal House Speaker Tony Smith did not cast a vote.)	128	4	16 (Note: Labor MP Wayne Swan was the only MP absent from Parliament for the duration of the sitting (refer to the last page of the parliament's Votes and Proceedings Record for the Sitting), all the other MPs listed deliberately abstained from the division.)

== Commencement of the Act ==
Royal assent was provided by the Governor-General on 8 December 2017. The Act went into effect on 9 December 2017, allowing same-sex couples who lawfully married in overseas jurisdictions to be recognised as married from that date, and therefore also able to divorce in Australia under the Family Law Act 1975. The date of effect allowed the first marriages under the amended law to occur on 9 January 2018, some of these occurring just after midnight. However, several couples successfully applied for an exemption from the normal one-month waiting period, and the first legal same-sex wedding under Australian law was held on 15 December 2017, with further weddings occurring the following day. The Australian Capital Territory Government offered free marriage certificates for couples who married there under the annulled 2013 law, which was struck down by the High Court.

== See also ==
- Marriage in Australia
- LGBT rights in Australia
- Same-sex marriage in Australia
- History of same-sex marriage in Australia
