= Reconciliation (family law) =

Reconciliation in family law is the process by which parties who are legally separated resume their marital relationship and cohabitation. Reconciliation is allowed because separation is revocable; state laws may require "the joint application of the parties, accompanied with satisfactory evidence of their reconciliation ... by the court which rendered it, subject to such regulations and restrictions as the court thinks fit to impose."
