= Family Law Act 1975 =

Act of the Parliament of Australia

Parliament of Australia
- Long title: An Act relating to Marriage and to Divorce and Matrimonial Causes and, in relation thereto and otherwise, Parental Responsibility for Children, and to financial matters arising out of the breakdown of de facto relationships and to certain other Matters ~ (amended); An Act relating to Marriage and to Divorce and Matrimonial Causes and, in relation thereto, Parental Rights and the Custody and Guardianship of Infants, and certain other Matters. ~ (original)
- Citation: No. 53, 1975 as amended or No. 53 of 1975
- Territorial extent: States and territories of Australia
- Enacted by: Australian House of Representatives
- Assented to: 12 June 1975
- Commenced: 5 January 1976

Legislative history
- Bill title: Family Law Bill 1975
- Introduced by: Senator Lionel Murphy
- Second reading: 29 October 1974

Amended by
- Family Law Legislation Amendment (Family Violence and Other Measures) Act 2011
- Status: Current legislation

The Family Law Act 1975 (Cth) is an act of the Parliament of Australia. It has 15 parts and is the primary piece of legislation dealing with divorce, parenting arrangements between separated parents (whether married or not), property separation, and financial maintenance involving children or divorced or separated de facto partners: in Australia. It also covers family violence. It came into effect on 5 January 1976, repealing the Matrimonial Causes Act 1961, which had been largely based on fault. On the first day of its enactment, 200 applications for divorce were filed in the Melbourne registry office of the Family Court of Australia, and 80 were filed in Adelaide, while only 32 were filed in Sydney.

== Background ==
Though the Commonwealth had the power since federation in 1901 to make laws affecting divorce and related matters such as custody and maintenance, it did not enact such national uniform laws until 1961, when the Matrimonial Causes Act 1959 came into operation. The act continued the fault-based system operating under state authority. Under the Commonwealth law a spouse had to establish one of the 14 grounds for divorce set out in the act, including adultery, desertion, cruelty, habitual drunkenness, imprisonment and insanity. In reality, the system was very expensive and humiliating for the spouses, necessitating appointment of barristers, often private detectives, collection of evidence, obtaining witness statements, photographs and hotel receipts, etc. Failure to prove a spouse's guilt or wrongdoing would result in a judge refusing to grant a divorce. The Matrimonial Causes Act 1959 was replaced by no-fault divorce system of the Family Law Act 1975.

The act was first introduced as a Bill on 13 December 1973. Before the Bill became law, it lapsed and was reintroduced on 3 April 1974 with substantial changes. A third reintroduction was made after the Bill lapsed a second time, with the final reintroduction made on 1 August 1974 with additional changes. The Act was contentions due to its reform of divorce laws. The legislation meant divorce could be obtained with one requisite being 12 months separation. A Gallup Poll taken during negotiation of the Bill showed 64% of men and 62% of women respectively supporting these changes.

== The Act ==
The legislation was enacted in 1975 by the Whitlam government One of the main innovations was the introduction of no-fault divorce. Couples no longer needed to show grounds for divorce, but instead, just that their relationship had suffered an irreconcilable breakdown.

Due to the division of power between the Commonwealth and the Australian states under the Australian Constitution, the Act initially could deal with children born or adopted only within a marriage, it was not until later years that the Act dealt with matters relating to ex-nuptial children. However, the states referred these powers to the Commonwealth and, until the 2006 amendments to the law, were all located under Chapter VII of the Act. For limitations on recognition of de facto couples inside and outside of Australia see Section 51(xxxvii) of the Constitution of Australia.

=== Divorce ===
The act revolutionised the divorce law of Australia by replacing the previous fault grounds with the single ground of irretrievable breakdown, established by separation and living apart for a period of twelve months. It also reduced the time for a decree nisi for a divorce to take effect from three months to one month.

Amendments in 2004 abolished the provisions dealing with "decrees nisi" or "decrees absolute" and changed the term dissolution of marriage to divorce. The twelve-month separation requirements remained and the one-month waiting period for a divorce order to take effect remained.

=== Parenting matters ===
==== Best interests of the child ====
The act focuses on the rights of children, rather than the rights of parents. The act requires courts to have regard to the 'need to protect the rights of children and promote their welfare' in any matter under the legislation.

==== Parenting orders ====
Part VII of the Act deals with the custody and welfare of children in Australia, regardless of the relationship between the parents. The Part has been amended significantly in 1995, 2006, and 2011.

Children's matters are determined on the basis of who the child will 'live with' and 'spend time with' (terms which were formerly labelled 'residence' and 'contact' respectively). Although the term custody often refers to where children live, the concept was abolished in 1995 with the Family Law Reform Act. The concept of custody gave much wider decision making powers to the parent with whom children lived, than either the concept of 'residence' or 'live with'. Since 1995 both parents legally have the same (but not shared) parental responsibility for children, regardless of where and with whom the children live, until and unless a court makes a different order.

Parental responsibility is the ability to make decisions that affect the day-to-day and long-term care and welfare of the child, and can include things such as what school they attend and what their name is.

The Act does not specify that the person with whom the child is to reside or spend time with must necessarily be their natural parent, and provision is made for anyone 'concerned with the care, welfare or development of the child' to apply to the Court for orders. In all proceedings, the paramount consideration is the 'best interests of the child', and the Court will not make an order that is contrary to these interests.

If there is a dispute about parenting matters and the case is placed before a court, then the Court must apply a presumption that it is in the best interests of children that their parents have equal shared parental responsibility for the children. In practical terms this means that parents must consult one another about major decisions affecting the care of children (but not day-to-day decisions), whereas without that order parents can make decisions together or without consulting each other. The presumption does not apply in circumstances of family violence or there has been any abuse (including sexual abuse) of a child, a parent or any family member living with the child.

There is no presumption of equal time with the child, however, if the presumption of equal shared parental responsibility has not been rebutted, the Court must consider whether it is in the best interests of the child and whether it is reasonably practicable. If the decision is made to not allocate equal time in such circumstances, then the Court is required to consider allocating 'substantial and significant' time instead.

Substantial and significant time includes weekends, weekdays, special days and holidays, and in practical terms usually means more than every second weekend.

The basis on which who the child lives with and spends time with (and how much time is spent) is determined firstly with reference to the best interests principle. What is in the child's 'best interests' is determined with reference to the primary and secondary considerations found under s.60CC, and it is by reference to these factors that argument proceeds in the Federal Circuit Court and the Family Court of Australia. Full custody (a 'live with' order) will usually be awarded to the parent who is better able to demonstrate that they can meet the child's best interests.

=== Property orders ===
Part VIII of the Act deals with the distribution of property after a marriage breakdown, and the Court has broad power under section 79 to order property settlement between parties based on a number of factors regarding 'contribution' and 'future needs'.

Because of the limitation of Commonwealth power, until 1 March 2009 the Family Court could adjudicate on a property dispute if it arose out of only a matrimonial relationship. In 2009 the states agreed to refer power to the Commonwealth to include breakup of de facto relationships (including same sex relationships) which was accepted. The changes, passed by the Labor Rudd Government, came into effect on 1 March 2009. Prior to this de facto and same-sex couples did not have the same property rights as married couples under the Act, and so had to rely on their state's de facto relationship legislation. Such claims were often much harder to prove than under the Act, and did not include all the same considerations as under the Act, and could result in a more uneven or diminished distribution of property than would otherwise be possible.

It is necessary to bring a property claim before or within 12 months of the divorce occurring or two years of separation for de facto couples, although unlike property proceedings in various other countries, the two usually occur separately.

A standard s.79 property adjustment, has 4 steps:

1. Identify the marital assets and ascribe a value to them
The assets which may be distributed under the Act include the totality of the parties' joint and several assets. The amount of property is determined at the date of hearing rather than at the date of divorce, so this can also include property acquired after separation. Superannuation is also a marital asset under s.90MC, but will not be available for distribution until it 'vests'
2. Look at each party's contributions to the marriage under s.79(4)
This section of the Act contains a list of factors by which the Court can determine who contributed what to the marriage. Broadly, the contributions can be taken as financial in nature (for example, paying off a mortgage) or non-financial in nature (for example, taking care of the children). The party which can demonstrate a larger contribution to the marital relationship will receive a larger proportion of the assets.
3. Look at each party's financial resources and future needs under s.75(2) and adjust accordingly
4 The court then considers whether the proposed distribution is just and equitable
After the parties' contributions have been established, a final adjustment is made according to their individual future needs. These needs can include factors such as an inability to gain employment, the continued care of a child under 18 years of age, and medical expenses. This is often used to account for a party which has not shown a great deal of substantive contributions, but will require money to live on as a result of factors largely outside of its control.

More complex questions arise when a party has incurred losses, or when assets are held by trusts.

==== Other provisions ====
Section 120 of the Act abolished the actions for criminal conversation, damages for adultery and enticement of a party to a marriage, but it did not change the law relating to breach of promise. The action for breach of promise has been abolished in South Australia.

=== The Courts ===
==== Creation of courts ====
The Act created the Family Court of Australia, with equal status to the Federal Court of Australia, as a court of record and with both original and appellate jurisdiction. Appeals from the Full Court of the Family Court of Australia (the appellate jurisdiction) are to the High Court of Australia.

In 2000, in a somewhat controversial move, the Australian government created the Federal Circuit Court of Australia as a second court to handle matters under the Act. Appeals from the Federal Circuit Court are to the Family Court of Australia, but its decisions are not considered inferior to the Family Court.

Western Australia has continued to refer its family law matters to the Family Court of Western Australia by virtue of the Family Court Act 1997 (WA).

==== Powers of the court ====
The Act gives the Court powers to make orders to restrain domestic violence, dispose of matrimonial property (including resources such as superannuation), parental responsibility, the living arrangements of children, and financial maintenance for former spouses or children.

The Court retains its ability to hand down punitive sanctions in a number of areas where parties do not comply with Court orders. In the most extreme cases, as confirmed by the 2006 Amendments, this can include sentences of imprisonment (up to 12 months), fines, work orders, bonds, and the like. In most cases, however, the most effective method of penalizing a person is to award legal costs against them. In fact, the 2006 Amendments encourage this to be used as a sanction where people make improper or false allegations about someone else before the Court.

=== Same-sex marriages ===
The Act recognises the need to preserve and protect the institution of marriage as the union between 2 persons, to the exclusion of all others voluntarily entered into for life.

The Federal Circuit Court of Australia holds jurisdiction to handle the dissolution of same sex marriages (i.e. divorces) through Part VI of the Act.

=== Other relationships ===
Polygamous marriages are generally not permitted in Australia. The relevant law prohibits those who are married from proceeding with a second marriage. However, the Act does permit multiple de facto relationships, and also recognises polygamous marriages may be lawfully entered into in countries other than Australia and grants rights under the Act to participants of these polygamous marriages.

De facto couples are also provided for under the Act.

=== Other provisions ===
The default position in family law proceedings is that each party pays his or her own costs. The Act also abolished prison as a penalty for maintenance defaulters and imprisoned those held in contempt of the court.

== Amendments ==
The Act has clearly, over time, been one of the most controversial pieces of Australian legislation and has been subject to numerous changes and amendments since its enactment. A number of amendments have reflected the political climate of the times: centre-left Australian governments, such as those led by the Australian Labor Party, strengthened the relevancy of non-financial contribution of the stay-at-home mother in property matters; centre-right governments, such as those led by the Liberal Party of Australia, have furthered the wishes of fathers' groups by extending the rights and responsibilities in negotiating parenting arrangements. The 2006 amendments changed the way matters involving children are dealt with. These included:

- a progression towards compulsory mediation (before Court proceedings can be filed, in an effort to ensure matters do not reach litigation),
- greater examination of issues involving family violence, child abuse or neglect,
- more importance being placed on a child's family and social connections, and
- a presumption that parents have equal parental responsibility - NOT equal parenting time.
- encouraging both parents to remain meaningfully involved in their children's lives following separation, provided there is no risk of violence or abuse.

== See also ==
- Australian family law
- Federal Circuit and Family Court of Australia
