= Legal separation =

Court approved separation that maintains a legal marriage

Legal separation (sometimes judicial separation, separate maintenance, divorce a mensa et thoro, or divorce from bed-and-board) is a legal process by which a married couple may formalize a marital separation while remaining legally married. A legal separation is granted in the form of a court order. In cases where children are involved, a court order of legal separation often makes child custody arrangements, specifying sole custody or shared parenting, as well as child support. Some couples obtain a legal separation as an alternative to a divorce, based on moral or religious objections to divorce.

Legal separation does not automatically lead to divorce. The couple might reconcile, in which case they do not have to do anything in order to continue their marriage.

== Legal separation ==
Legal separation is a separation that is sanctioned by a court order, meaning that the spouses may legally live apart, but they are still legally married. The legitimacy of any future child born to the couple remains intact, and the spouses may not legally remarry. This type of separation allows the couple to live apart without concerns about being taken to court for "desertion". (In some jurisdictions, provable "desertion" is legal grounds for a divorce.)

There are several reasons why a couple might seek a legal separation. In some legal jurisdictions, including certain countries, it can be difficult to get a full and final divorce, but if the spouses are already legally separated for an extended period of time (for example, three years), the court may decide to grant a full and final divorce. When the requirements of burden of proof for a divorce are difficult to meet, in most jurisdictions, a legal separation ruling assures the couple a slot in the court's schedule whenever they file for a full divorce, by showing that they were both serious about their separation.

Sometimes, a legal separation is used when one partner is claimed to be emotionally, verbally, or physically abusive, keeping the marriage in existence while the two spouses are physically separated. This physical separation may give the two of them a chance to work out the problems in their relationship while residing in legally sanctioned separate dwellings. Spouses may also request a legal separation to protect themselves from accusations of desertion or abandonment—such as in cases where one must depart from the other for an extended period of time.

== In specific countries ==
=== Canada ===
In Canada, "separation" is when a couple decides to live apart as a consequence of their relationship breaking down. This differs from the specific legal status of legal or judicial separation in some other jurisdictions, which requires filing with the courts. A mensa et thoro separation does not exist in most provinces, but the term "legal separation" is commonly used for a contract created between two spouses at the time of their separation, more properly referred to as a separation agreement, a legally binding written contract voluntarily signed by two spouses (either married or common law) who have separated.

However, the province of Saskatchewan does allow a legal separation under provincial law, which is distinct from a divorce under federal law. A legal separation in Saskatchewan can be granted by the Court of King's Bench.

In Ontario, a separation agreement is unenforceable unless it is made in writing, signed by the parties and witnessed. This written agreement usually resolves all issues arising from the separation, including custody and access, child support, spousal support and the division of property, except only a court can grant a divorce itself.

=== Ireland ===
Before the introduction of the Judicial Separation and Family Law Reform Act 1989, the only means of judicial separation available in the Republic of Ireland was to seek a decree of divorce a mensa et thoro. This could only be obtained on the grounds of adultery, cruelty, or "unnatural practices" (a concept never defined by the legislature or the courts). Post-1989 judicial separation is possible on one of six grounds, proven on the balance of probabilities:

1. Respondent has committed adultery.
2. Respondent has behaved in such a way that the applicant cannot reasonably be expected to live with them (mental or physical cruelty).
3. The respondent has deserted for a continuous period of at least one year immediately preceding the date of application.
4. Both parties have lived apart for a continuous period of at least one year immediately preceding the date of application, and the respondent consents to the decree.
5. Both parties have lived apart for a continuous period of at least three years immediately preceding the date of application.
6. The marriage has broken down to the extent that the court is satisfied in all the circumstances that a normal marital relationship has not existed between the spouses for a period of at least one year immediately preceding the date of the application.

Of the six grounds, the latter forms the basis of the vast majority of judicial separation decrees. A "normal marital relationship" is not defined. The court must only be satisfied that there has been the loss of an "essential ingredient of the marriage".

=== United States ===
In the United States of America, a legal separation may address the division of assets, division of debts, child custody, child support, and alimony. A separate maintenance agreement is not a legal separation and therefore child support and custody are typically not allowed to be addressed. A separate maintenance agreement is often confused with a legal separation which is filed with a court. Separate maintenance agreements are contracts between spouses and not approved by a court. They are similar to prenuptial agreements.

Under the law of some states, a separation can occur by judicial decree, or by an acknowledged ("notarized") agreement of the parties. In some states, there must be grounds or a cause of action to get a judicial decree of separation, such as "cruel and inhuman treatment ... abandonment ... neglect or refusal [to] support ... adultery by the defendant, [or] confinement of the defendant in prison ...." Reconciliation is allowed. So, therefore, separation is revocable; state laws may require "the joint application of the parties, accompanied with satisfactory evidence of their reconciliation ... by the court which rendered it, subject to such regulations and restrictions as the court thinks fit to impose."

=== Philippines ===
In the Philippines, a legal separation may only be had through a valid judicial decree. In addition, actions for legal separation shall not be tried "before six months have elapsed since the filing of the petition." During this six-month "cooling-off" period, the spouses are encouraged to find forgiveness.

Under the Civil Code, there were only two grounds for legal separation:

1. For adultery on the part of the wife and for concubinage on the part of the husband as defined in the Penal Code; or
2. An attempt by one spouse against the life of the other.

The grounds were later expanded under Article 55 of the Family Code:

1. Repeated physical violence or grossly abusive conduct directed against the petitioner, a common child, or a child of the petitioner;
2. Physical violence or moral pressure to compel the petitioner to change religious or political affiliation;
3. Attempt of respondent to corrupt or induce the petitioner, a common child, or a child of the petitioner, to engage in prostitution, or connivance in such corruption or inducement;
4. Final judgment sentencing the respondent to imprisonment of more than six years, even if pardoned;
5. Drug addiction or habitual alcoholism of the respondent;
6. Lesbianism or homosexuality of the respondent;
7. Contracting by the respondent of a subsequent bigamous marriage, whether in the Philippines or abroad;
8. Sexual infidelity or perversion;
9. Attempt by the respondent against the life of the petitioner; or
10. Abandonment of petitioner by respondent without justifiable cause for more than one year.

(Note that the term "child" includes a child by nature or by adoption)

Article 63 of the Family Code enumerates the following concrete effects of a decree of legal separation:

1. The spouses shall be entitled to live separately from each other, but the marriage bonds shall not be severed;
2. The absolute community or the conjugal partnership shall be dissolved and liquidated but the offending spouse shall have no right to any share of the net profits earned by the absolute community or the conjugal partnership, which shall be forfeited in accordance with the provisions of Article 43(2);
3. The custody of the minor children shall be awarded to the innocent spouse, subject to the provisions of Article 213 of this Code; and
4. The offending spouse shall be disqualified from inheriting from the innocent spouse by intestate succession. Moreover, provisions in favor of the offending spouse made in the will of the innocent spouse shall be revoked by operation of law.

=== Italy ===
The law of Italy requires a period of legal separation (one year for contested separations, six months for consensual separations) before a decree of full and final divorce can be issued.

== See also ==
- Divorce
- Family therapy
- Marital separation
- Relationship counseling
