= No-fault divorce =

Divorce in response to either party petition

No-fault divorce is the dissolution of a marriage that does not require a showing of wrongdoing by either party. Laws providing for no-fault divorce allow a family court to grant a divorce in response to a petition by either party of the marriage without requiring the petitioner to provide evidence that the defendant has committed a breach of the marital contract.

== History ==
In early modern Europe, Prussia took a pioneering role with Frederick the Great's 1757 edict allowing marriages to be dissolved on the ground of serious and continuous hostility between spouses, without pointing to any one guilty party. This early example of no-fault divorce was expanded on and formalized with the 1794 General State Laws for the Prussian States, which allowed childless couples to file for divorce without giving a ground.

The first modern no-fault divorce law was enacted in Russia in December 1917 following the October Revolution of the same year. Regarding marriage as a bourgeois institution, the new government transferred divorce jurisdiction from the Russian Orthodox Church to the state courts, which could grant it on application of either spouse. Alimony guarantees under the new regime were weak until a new family code was passed in 1926.

With a law adopted in 1969, California became the first U.S. state to permit no-fault divorce. California's law was framed on a roughly contemporaneous effort of the non-governmental organization National Conference of Commissioners on Uniform State Laws, which began drafting a model of no-fault divorce statute for states to consider in 1967.

The Uniform Marriage and Divorce Act (UMDA) is a model law in the United States and has been used since 1970.

Australia established no-fault divorce in 1975, with the only ground for divorce being irretrievable breakdown of marriage, evidenced by a twelve-month separation. Canada effectively permitted no-fault divorce in 1986 by reducing the separation period to one year.

== Controversy ==
=== Arguments for no-fault divorce ===
Several studies have looked at the effect of no-fault divorce on divorce rates in the United States. The studies typically find an increase in the short-term rate but little long-term causal relationship. The most frequent explanation given is that the older laws were ineffective and not followed anyway, though there are some differing viewpoints. Economists Betsey Stevenson and Justin Wolfers, based on findings in their research, argue that domestic violence and female suicide declines in states that legalize no-fault divorce. Specifically, they report that "states that adopted no-fault divorce experienced a decrease of 8 to 16 percent in wives' suicide rates and a 30 percent decline in domestic violence." They also argue that their research proves that there is no permanent effect of no-fault divorce laws on divorce rates.

Stephanie Coontz, a professor of history at Evergreen State College, stated in 2010 that "in the years since no-fault divorce became well-nigh universal, the national divorce rate has fallen, from about 23 divorces per 1,000 married couples in 1979 to under 17 per 1,000 in 2005." She adds that "once you permit the courts to determine when a person's desire to leave is legitimate, you open the way to arbitrary decisions about what is or should be tolerable in a relationship, made by people who have no stake in the actual lives being lived."

A 2010 New York Times editorial said that New York was "the only state where a court must find fault before granting a divorce unless the spouses have lived apart for a full year under a formal separation agreement — a proven formula for inviting false testimony, endless litigation and generally making divorce far more painful than it needs to be." Later that year, New York became the final state to allow no-fault divorce. Lawyer L. M. Fenton states that "Feminist holdouts against New York's new [no-fault divorce] bill don't understand how family law affects women today", adding: "It also mystifies me that spouses could still, even in 2010, be forced to stay married to someone who refused to let go."

Fault-based grounds usually include mental cruelty, but true mental cruelty has a psychological component that can make it very difficult for the abused spouse to articulate that abuse. More to the point, the abused spouse may be terrified to describe the relationship on paper and testify about it in a court. And of course, a controlling partner will always choose the path of most resistance to whatever it is that the other spouse wants.

The state adopted no-fault divorce later that year.

Upon the introduction of no-fault divorce in England and Wales in 2022, the United Kingdom Government stated that it would allow couples to focus on agreeing important arrangements for the future such as those involving children, finance and property as opposed to proving fault at a time when emotions are already running high.

=== Arguments against no-fault divorce ===
The National Organization for Women opposed the introduction of no-fault divorce in New York State because it would allow a party who actually is at fault to obtain a divorce in which "alimony, maintenance [and] property division" would be determined without the judge considering "the facts, behavior and circumstances that led to the break-up of the marriage".

A paper was published in the Harvard Journal of Law and Public Policy, written by Douglas Allen, on the economics of same-sex marriage; its second half discusses the parallels between this change in family law alongside no-fault divorce. The section on the latter development highlights the immediate increase in divorces which contradicted contemporary arguments for no-fault divorce: As an example of this, the paper cites the introduction of no-fault divorce in Canada leading to a six-fold increase in just two years from 1968 to 1970, "after a century of rather stable divorce rates." It also argues that the law increased the rate at which women entered the workforce despite a flatlining in real wages for female workers, increased the number of hours worked in a week, increased the feminization of poverty, and increased the age at which people married.

== Laws by country ==
=== Australia ===
Australia adopted no-fault divorce in 1975 with the enactment of the Family Law Act 1975. The only ground for divorce is irretrievable breakdown of marriage, evidenced by a twelve-month separation. However, a residual "fault" element remains in relation to child custody and property settlement issues.

=== Brazil ===
In Brazil, divorce is considered an immediate and unconditional right ("direito potestativo") and operates under the no-fault model since the approval of Constitutional Amendment No. 66 on July 13, 2010. This amendment eliminated previous requirements, such as prior judicial separation or proof of fault for certain behaviors, radically simplifying the process. Currently, the unilateral will of one spouse, expressed in a legal action or public deed, is sufficient for the judge to decree the divorce, without the need to investigate the reasons or obtain the consent of the other party.

=== Canada ===
In Canada before 1968, the only grounds for divorce were adultery or cruelty. However, in 1968, the Divorce Act was amended to permit divorce for other reasons, including physical and mental cruelty and separation for at least three years. The Divorce Act was amended in 1986 to reduce the separation period to one year, with no requirement to prove "fault" by either spouse. The fault grounds for divorce are also available.

=== China ===
China has nominally allowed no-fault divorce since the adoption of the New Marriage Law in 1950. No-fault divorce has become much more common since the 1980s. The current marriage law provides that divorce shall always be granted if sought by both husband and wife. Divorce is also granted if one party can present evidence of incompatibility, such as separation for at least two years.

Divorce may be granted either by court or by a marriage registration office. The latter can only do so when both parties have reached an agreement on child custody and property settlement.

=== Germany ===
Until 1976, divorce was only possible if one spouse had acted wrongly – a rule referred to as the Schuldprinzip ("principle of guilt"). In 1976, the law was changed to make no-fault divorces the standard. The law says that "A marriage may be dissolved by divorce if it has broken down. The marriage has broken down if the conjugal community of the spouses no longer exists and it cannot be expected that the spouses restore it." Couples are required to remain married for one year ("Trennungsjahr") even if both parties desire the divorce.

Some provisions of the old, fault-based system remain. In particular, the separation period required before a formal divorce can be shortened if "the continuation of the marriage would be an unreasonable hardship for the petitioner for reasons that lie in the person of the other spouse". While formally no fault is required, in practice this rule is usually applied if the spouse acts irresponsibly, for example if they are violent or threaten their partner.

=== Malta ===
A law permitting no-fault divorce went into effect in October 2011, following a national referendum on the subject. This was the first Maltese law permitting any kind of divorce.

=== Mexico ===
In Mexico City, this type of divorce is legally known as "divorcio incausado o sin expresión de causa" and colloquially as "divorcio exprés". The law was passed in 2008 and was held constitutional by the Supreme Court, which in 2015 determined that any state law requiring the case for a divorce to be proven was unconstitutional.

=== Russia ===
No-fault divorce was introduced by the Bolsheviks following the Russian Revolution of 1917. Before the Revolution, religious institutions tended to define family life. It was the ecclesiastical law of the Russian Orthodox Church that controlled the family, marriage, and divorce. For example, the official registration of birth, death, marriage, and divorce was the responsibility of the parish church. Under these non-secular laws, divorce was highly restricted (but always somewhat available, since the Russian Orthodox Church allows divorce for adultery, desertion, and physical cruelty).

The 1918 Decree on Divorce eliminated the religious marriage and the underlying ecclesiastical law, replacing them with civil marriage sanctioned by the state. Divorce was obtained by filing a mutual consent document with the Russian Registry Office, or by the unilateral request of one party to the court. The divorce law under the Bolsheviks did not penalize the husband with alimony, child support, or debtor's prison for non-payment, as every individual was to be provided for by the state anyway. The two partners were entirely free of legal obligations to each other after divorce. The concept of child support, however, was introduced to the family law of Russia in the 1990s after the fall of the Soviet Union.

=== Spain ===
In Spain, this type of divorce is legally known as divorcio incausado or divorcio unilateral and colloquially as divorcio exprés. No-fault divorce was introduced in Spain in 2005 as part of the reform of Spain's divorce law of 1981.

=== Sweden ===
Swedish divorce law does not include a requirement to show fault. The couple can file for divorce together or one party can file alone. If one party does not wish to get divorced or if they have children under 16 living at home, there is a required contemplation period of 6 to 12 months. During this period, they stay married and the request must be confirmed for the divorce to be finalized.

=== United Kingdom ===
The fault-based system as used in England and Wales prior to 2022 had been reported in the media as unnecessarily provocative, in that couples had to appropriate blame for the marriage breakdown. The family justice system followed the Children Act 1989 Part 1 Section 1, which states "the child's welfare shall be the court's paramount consideration" when a court determines any question with respect to the upbringing of a child.

Following years of campaigning by the legal community, Parliament passed the Divorce, Dissolution and Separation Act 2020, which came into force on 6 April 2022, under which a spouse only has to declare to the court, without having to prove fault or separation, that their marriage has irretrievably broken down. This reform also applies to dissolving a civil partnership.

Scotland permits de facto no-fault divorce under certain grounds set out by the Divorce (Scotland) Act 1976 (as amended by the Family Law (Scotland) Act 2006). One example is when a couple proves they have resided separately for at least a year and no-fault divorce can therefore be granted with the consent of the other party.

=== United States ===
Today, every state plus the District of Columbia permits no-fault divorce, though requirements for obtaining a no-fault divorce vary. California was the first U.S. state to enact a no-fault divorce law. Its law was signed by Governor Ronald Reagan, a divorced and remarried former movie actor, and came into effect in 1970. New York was the last state to enact a no-fault divorce law, in 2010.

Before no-fault divorce was available, spouses seeking divorce would often allege false grounds for divorce. Removing the incentive to perjure was one motivation for the no-fault movement.

In the states of Wisconsin, Oregon, Washington, Nevada, Nebraska, Montana, Missouri, Minnesota, Michigan, Kentucky, Kansas, Illinois, Iowa, Indiana, Hawaii, Florida, Colorado and California, a person seeking a divorce is not permitted to allege a fault-based ground (e.g. adultery, abandonment or cruelty).

==== Requirements before the enactment of no-fault divorce ====
Prior to the advent of no-fault divorce, a divorce was processed through the adversarial system as a civil action, meaning that a divorce could be obtained only through a showing of fault of one—and only one—of the parties in a marriage. This required that one spouse plead that the other had committed adultery, abandonment, felony, or other similarly culpable acts. However, the other spouse could plead a variety of defenses, like recrimination (essentially an accusation of "so did you"). A judge could find that the respondent had not committed the alleged act or the judge could accept the defense of recrimination and find both spouses at fault for the dysfunctional nature of their marriage. Either of these two findings was sufficient to defeat an action for divorce, which meant that the parties remained married.

In some states, requirements were even more stringent. For instance, under its original (1819) constitution, Alabama required not only the consent of a court of chancery for a divorce (and only "in cases provided for by law"), but equally that of two-thirds of both houses of the state legislature. The required vote in this case was even stricter than that required to overturn the governor's veto, which required only a simple majority of both houses of the General Assembly. This requirement was dropped in 1861, when the state adopted a new constitution at the outset of the American Civil War.

==== Bypassing the showing-of-fault requirements for divorce ====
These requirements could be problematic if both spouses were at fault or if neither spouse had committed a legally culpable act but both spouses desired a divorce by mutual consent. Lawyers began to advise their clients on how to manufacture "legal fictions" to bypass the statutory requirements, with the result that by the 1920s, the actual operation of the legal system was "completely at odds with statute and case law". One method popular in New York was referred to as "collusive adultery", in which the husband would check into a hotel with a "mistress" obtained for the occasion. A photographer, also obtained for the occasion, would suddenly appear out of nowhere to take snapshots of the husband and his "mistress" in flagrante delicto. Upon presentation of the photos in court, the judge would convict the husband of adultery, and the couple could be divorced.

In many other states, especially California, the most popular allegation for divorce was cruelty (which was then unavailable in New York). For example, in 1950, wives pleaded "cruelty" as the basis for 70 percent of San Francisco divorce cases. Wives would regularly testify to the same facts: their husbands swore at them, hit them, and generally treated them terribly. This procedure was described by Supreme Court of California Associate Justice Stanley Mosk:

Every day, in every superior court in the state, the same melancholy charade was played: the "innocent" spouse, generally the wife, would take the stand and, to the accompanying cacophony of sobbing and nose-blowing, testify under the deft guidance of an attorney to the spousal conduct that she deemed "cruel."

An even simpler practice for people living in states where divorce was difficult to obtain was to go "forum shopping". This meant one of the parties would move to another state where divorce laws were less restrictive, stay there long enough to become a resident, then file for divorce there. Nevada was extremely popular for this purpose as starting in the 1930s its residency requirement was only six weeks. During this period the city of Reno openly advertised itself as the "divorce capital of the world" and gained a national reputation as a divorce mill. For some couples, if there really was no problem in settling the issues of their marriage, a weekend trip to Mexico was also an option. Or in some cases, a party deciding they wanted to marry someone else could combine a filing for divorce and a new marriage in one trip to Mexico. As no-fault became near-universal, the need to use Nevada or Mexico to evade restrictive divorce laws became less and less necessary.

==== Advocates for eliminating the showing-of-fault requirements ====
Many American lawyers and judges objected to the legal fictions used to satisfy the requirements for divorce, which were effectively rendering oaths meaningless and threatening to damage the integrity of the American justice system by making perjury into a commonplace occurrence. American judges were deeply troubled by the "cognitive dissonance between the court's duty to uphold the formal law and its intention nevertheless to accede to the demands of the consumers of justice". As early as the 1930s, a treatise on American family law complained:

In divorce litigation it is well known that the parties often seek to evade the statutory limitations and thus there is great danger of perjury, collusion, and fraud. In many cases no defense is interposed, and often when the case is contested the contest is not waged with vigor or good faith.

Thus, advocates for no-fault divorce argued that the law should be changed to provide a straightforward procedure for ending a marriage, rather than forcing a couple who simply couldn't get along to choose between living together in "marital hell" or lying under oath in open court. The most prominent advocate of this position was feminist law professor Herma Hill Kay (who later became dean of UC Berkeley School of Law).

At its convention in 1947, the National Association of Women Lawyers (NAWL) voted to draft and promote a bill that would embody the ideal of no-fault divorce and describes its efforts to promote the passage of no-fault divorce laws as "the greatest project NAWL has ever undertaken."

Other states were slower to adopt no-fault divorce. For example, Pennsylvania did not introduce no-fault divorce until around 1980.

==== California's Family Law Act of 1969 ====
California adopted no-fault divorce with the Family Law Act of 1969, which became effective January 1, 1970. The Act abolished California's action for divorce and replaced it with a proceeding for dissolution of marriage on the grounds of irreconcilable differences. The grounds of irreconcilable differences are accepted as true, and can be based on the assertions of one of the parties to the marriage.

==== Uniform Marriage and Divorce Act ====
At about the same time that California adopted no-fault divorce, the National Conference of Commissioners of Uniform State Laws (NCCUSL) appointed a committee to draft a uniform marriage and divorce law for consideration by state legislatures, and the American Bar Association's Family Law Section was asked to appoint a committee to work with the committee from the NCCUSL. The initial draft of the Uniform Marriage and Divorce Law written by the NCCUSL committee would direct judges to grant the petitioner's request to end the marriage if the judge found that the marriage was "irretrievably broken", a term which this draft did not define. Since the term "irretrievably broken" was not defined, the committee from the ABA Family Law Section disapproved of this draft of the Uniform Marriage and Divorce Act. In response, the NCCUSL committee added a 180-day separation requirement in order for judges to find that the marriage had been irretrievably broken. However, the NCCUSL committee also added language to allow judges to grant a petitioner a divorce if "there is serious marital discord adversely affecting one or both parties toward the marriage."

The committee from the ABA Family Law Section objected to the ability of a petitioner to avoid the 180-day separation requirement by asserting "serious marital discord". In his letter recommending that the ABA House of Delegates not approve the amended draft proposed by the NCCUSL, Arnold J. Gibbs, the chairman of the ABA Family Law Section, stated that "The creation of a mere 'rubber stamp type' of divorce procedure would not be in the best interests of the family, its individual members, and society in general."

Copies of the recommendation to disapprove the NCCUSL's amended draft were provided to the National Conference of Commissioners of Uniform State Laws (NCCUSL), Young Lawyers Section and the National Association of Women Lawyers (NAWL). The committee from the NCCUSL refused to further amend its draft of the Uniform Marriage and Divorce Act.

At the 1974 midwinter meeting of the American Bar Association in Houston, Council members of the Family Law Section indicated dissatisfaction with the public image the section was getting from its opposition to the NCCUSL's draft of the Uniform Marriage and Divorce Act. In a policy statement, the ABA Family Law Section chose "to recognize separation only as conclusive evidence of marital breakdown and not as its unbending test", implying that "other kinds of evidence would be admissible to establish breakdown as well."

==== Adoption of no-fault divorce laws by the other states ====
By 1977, nine states had adopted no-fault divorce laws, and by late 1983, every state but South Dakota and New York had adopted some form of no-fault divorce (although some forms were not as easy to obtain as that in California). South Dakota adopted no-fault divorce in 1985. Until August 2010, New York still lacked a unilateral no-fault divorce statute; under New York divorce law, only if both parties executed and acknowledged a separation agreement and lived separately for one year could a judge convert it into a divorce. New York governor David Paterson signed a no-fault divorce bill on August 15, 2010.

As of September 2026, no-fault divorce is allowed in all fifty states and the District of Columbia. However, Mississippi and South Dakota only allow a no-fault divorce if both parties agree.

==== Conservative opposition in the 2020s ====
In the 2020s, conservative activists, including Steven Crowder, Matt Walsh, Michael Knowles, as well as commentator Tim Pool, and some state Republican parties have advocated for the abolition or restriction of no-fault divorce. Similarly, conservative politicians like JD Vance, Mike Johnson, and Ben Carson also support significantly limiting no-fault divorce.

On January 18, 2024, State Senator Dusty Deevers introduced Oklahoma SB 1958, a bill aimed at modifying the grounds for divorce in the state. This bill proposes to include considerations of fault in divorce proceedings, marking a significant shift from the current no-fault divorce framework in Oklahoma.

== See also ==
- At-fault divorce
- Migratory divorce
- Religion and divorce
