= Endeavour Forum =

- Founded: 1979
- Founder: Babette Francis (1930-2024)
- Location: Melbourne
- Region served: Australia
- Website: http://www.endeavourforum.org.au/

Endeavour Forum (originally Women Who Want to be Women) is a conservative political organisation describing itself as "a Christian, pro-life, pro-family organisation that was founded to counter feminism, to defend the right to life of the unborn, and to support marriage and the natural family." It was founded in 1979 by the late Babette Francis AM (1930–2024) and has links to similar groups, such as the Australian Family Association and the World Congress of Families. It exerted strong influence on the Fraser government of the seventies and eighties and the Queensland state government led by Sir Joh Bjelke-Petersen (1911–2005) until it fell due to internal government corruption in the late eighties.

The Endeavour Forum is listed on the Australian National Women's Register as a lobby group and as a "women's rights organisation". Formerly known as "Women Who Want to be Women", it is now known as Endeavour Forum because the organisation recognised that men comprised a significant proportion of their membership and therefore their original name was inappropriate.

== Lobbying ==
The Endeavour Forum campaigns against abortion with Francis being the Australian representative of the Coalition on Abortion/Breast Cancer. However, abortion in Australia has been decriminalised throughout Australia's various states and territories.

The Endeavour Forum has raised concerns regarding Islam in Australia and its radicalisation.

The organisation was a partner of the Coalition for Marriage in advancing the "No" case, associated with the Australian Marriage Law Postal Survey. As with the decriminalisation and liberalisation of abortion in Australia, it ultimately failed to prevent the recognition of same-sex marriage in Australia regardless.

The Endeavour Forum's founder, Babette Francis, was appointed as a Member in the General Division of the Order of Australia (AM) by the Governor-General of Australia in the 2022 Queen's Birthday Honours List. In 2022, she retired from the leadership of the organisation that she founded and is which is now led wholly by men. Mrs Francis died in July 2024

== See also ==
- Australian Christian Lobby
- FamilyVoice Australia
- Marriage Alliance
- National Civic Council
