= Christian politics in Australia =

Christian democracy of the type found in Europe never gained a strong presence in Australia. While sectarianism was an important factor in Australian politics in the early 20th century it was only a single element in political divisions at the time, with Roman Catholics along with the Irish tending to be drawn towards the left-wing Australian Labor Party, while Protestants were grouped alongside the British in the various anti-Labor conservative parties of the time.

Even as Australians' levels of church attendance declined, religious influence, particularly the influence of socially conservative Christians, within political parties has remained strong. In 2017 the Parliamentary Christian Fellowship meet fortnightly, with about 60 members from all sides of politics in attendance. This is more than a quarter of total parliamentary members. The Australian National Prayer Breakfast started in 1985 and is based on the National Prayer Breakfast. Conservative religious community groups such as the Australian Family Association have been vocal in their opposition to developments such as gay rights and same sex marriage.

Christian organisations, especially the Catholic Church in Australia are influential on many social and political issues. It operates through a number of front organisations ostensibly on particular public issues, such as the Australian Family Association, the Australian Family Coalition, the Australian Christian Lobby and the Marriage Alliance, all of which oppose legalisation of same-sex marriage in Australia, and Freedom for Faith, which promotes itself as "a Christian legal think tank that exists to see religious freedom protected and promoted in Australia," but which proposed to the Ruddock Inquiry Into Religious Freedom in Australia to make further exceptions to the Discrimination Act ostensibly on the basis of religious freedom.

== Parties ==
- United Christian Party (1972–1983)
- Australian Family Movement (1974–1990)
- Christian Democratic Party (1977–2022)
- One Australia Movement (1986–1992)
- Family First Party (2002–2017)
- Rise Up Australia Party (2011–2019)
- Australian Christians (party) (2011–present)
- Australian Family Party (2020–)
- Family First Party (2021–)

== Election results ==
Year	House of Representatives			Senate		
Year	Candidate(s)	Votes	%	Candidate(s)	Votes	%
1980	United Christian Party	2,050	0.02	Call to Australia	118,535	1.54
1980				Concerned Christian Candidates	4,189	0.05
1980				Christian Democrat Party	1,648	0.02
1980	Total	2,050	0.02	Total	124,372	1.62
1983	Australian Christian Party	3,016	0.03	Call to Australia	96,065	1.20
1983				Christian Voice	3,113	0.04
1983				Australian Family Movement	326	0.00
1983	Total	3,016	0.03	Total	99,504	1.24
1984				Call to Australia	162,272	1.82
1984				Australian Family Movement	18,841	0.21
1984				Total	181,113	2.03
1987	Australian Family Movement	4,065	0.04	Call to Australia	136,825	1.46
1987				One Australia Movement	13,063	0.14
1987	Total	4,065	0.04	Total	149,888	1.60
1990	Call to Australia	96,497	0.97	Call to Australia	136,522	1.37
1993	Call to Australia	49,467	0.47	Call to Australia	108,945	1.02
1996	Call to Australia	43,183	0.40	Call to Australia	117,274	1.08
1998	Christian Democratic Party	64,916	0.58	Christian Democratic Party	122,516	1.09
2001	Christian Democratic Party	69,294	0.60	Christian Democratic Party	129,966	1.12
2004	Family First Party	235,315	2.01	Family First Party	210,567	1.76
2004	Christian Democratic Party	72,241	0.62	Christian Democratic Party	140,674	1.18
2004	Total	307,556	2.63	Total	351,241	2.94
2007	Family First Party	246,792	1.99	Family First Party	204,788	1.62
2007	Christian Democratic Party	104,705	0.84	Christian Democratic Party	118,614	0.94
2007	Total	351,497	2.83	Total	323,402	2.56
2010	Family First Party	279,330	2.25	Family First Party	267,493	2.10
2010	Christian Democratic Party	83,009	0.67	Christian Democratic Party	127,894	1.01
2010	Total	362,339	2.92	Total	395,387	3.11
2013	Family First Party	181,820	1.41	Family First Party	149,306	1.11
2013	Christian Democratic Party	88,576	0.69	Christian Democratic Party	72,544	0.54
2013	Rise Up Australia Party	48,582	0.38	Rise Up Australia Party	49,341	0.37
2013	Australian Christians	42,498	0.33	Australian Christians	54,154	0.40
2013	Total	361,476	2.80	Total	325,345	2.43
2016	Family First Party	201,222	1.49	Family First Party	191,112	1.38
2016	Christian Democratic Party	178,026	1.31	Christian Democratic Party	162,155	1.17
2016	Rise Up Australia Party	68,418	0.51	Rise Up Australia Party	36,424	0.26
2016	Australian Christians	43,150	0.32	Australian Christians	66,525	0.48
2016	Total	490,816	3.62	Total	456,216	3.30
2019	Christian Democratic Party	97,513	0.68	Christian Democratic Party	94,301	0.65
2019	Rise Up Australia Party	14,032	0.10	Rise Up Australia Party	64,344	0.44
2019	Australian Christians	23,802	0.17	Australian Christians	23,983	0.16
2019	Total	135,347	0.95	Total	182,628	1.25
2022	Australian Christians	19,867	0.14	Australian Christians	33,143	0.22
2022				Australian Family Party	4,799	0.03
2022	Total	19,867	0.14	Total	37,942	0.25

== See also ==
- Australian Christian Lobby
- Irreligion in Australia
- Marriage Alliance
- Politics of Australia
- Religion in Australia
