= Wendy Francis =

Australian political activist and lobbyist

- Born: Wendy Francis; Brisbane, Australia
- Occupation: Lobbyist
- Website: www.wendyfrancis.com.au

Wendy Francis is an Australian political activist. She is a lobbyist on social issues and was formerly the Queensland and Northern Territory state director of the Australian Christian Lobby (ACL). Wendy was the managing director of ACL and National Director for Politics until her recent retirement. She has a podcast, 'warmly, Wendy'.

== Biography ==
Wendy Francis was the Executive Producer of the Brisbane Lord Mayor's Christmas Carols for several years. She is married to Peter Francis, who is a Baptist pastor and was Principal of Malyon College until his retirement in 2025.

Francis' political interests before joining ACL in January 2011 included her running as the lead Senate candidate in Queensland for the Family First Party in the 2010 Federal election. She created controversy when she compared allowing same-sex marriage to the stolen generations and to "legalising child abuse".

Chad St James, the Brisbane editor of SameSame, said of Wendy Francis:

"Over a couple of hours sitting in a cafe, the two of us chatted and for the very first time I saw very human side to a woman who has been one of our most stringent opponents to marriage equality. I also gained a better understanding of her motivations, and I won’t deny that it was one of the most surprising coffee dates I have had a long time".

Francis shared a personal story on Brisbane radio on the impact of her sister's death.

== Lobbying ==
Since 2007, Francis has run 'meet the candidate forums' for ACL in 15 to 20 Queensland electorates in each election.

On 8 August 2010 Francis tweeted "Children in homosexual relationships are subject to emotional abuse. Legitimising gay marriage is like legalising child abuse." Francis later deleted the tweet but stood by her comments.

During April 2013, Francis lobbied against government subsidies for the abortion drug RU486 saying, "Women facing unsupported pregnancies should be offered real support – not a chemical which is harmful to both them and their unborn child."

Francis has argued for outdoor advertising to be ‘G-rated’. She organised ACL members to protest against bus shelter billboards – where as Francis said, "children are waiting for the school bus" – promoting safe sex, which featured a fully clothed, hugging, gay couple holding an unopened condom packet. Francis was criticised due to her campaign not mentioning any affiliation with the ACL, and for describing the image as an act of foreplay. A Queensland Parliament committee conducted a public hearing where Francis argued that all billboards should be 'G-rated'. The committee subsequently recommended a tougher approach to sexually explicit outdoor advertising.

In May 2013 after a billboard was erected in Kings Cross, New South Wales, Francis lobbied to have it removed. The billboard displayed a fictionalised UK prime minister having sex with a pig. Francis said children should not have to see an adult image like this. The billboard was subsequently taken down.

In August 2013 a ruling was made against the owners of a billboard by the Advertising Standards Bureau (ASB). The ASB said it presented women, "in a manner that was subservient and degrading". The owners said they would comply with the ruling. With the billboard remaining in place in August 2015, Francis said that self-regulation is not working.

Francis has campaigned against the offensive slogans painted on the sides of Wicked Camper vans. Francis has similarly campaigned against a series of ads for shoes which incorporate naked models. The promoters say their ads are a "celebration of sexual expression" and are designed to "target a younger audience".

Francis received abuse over her support of changes in surrogacy laws to exclude same sex couples and single people.

In July 2015, Francis lodged a petition with the Queensland parliament complaining about the Safe Schools program. The petition incorporated wording from a Safe Schools student resource, OMG I’m Queer, intended for children aged 11 and up. However the Clerk of the Parliament would not permit the wording on Queensland parliament's website because of the "intemperate" language. The 10,891-signature, petition was subsequently tabled with the "intemperate" wording censored. While the Palaszczuk government has said that it does not have plans to introduce the Safe Schools program in Queensland, Francis is concerned that that could be reintroduced in some other form. Francis has said that she supported anti-bullying programs, but the Safe Schools Coalition goes "way beyond that".

Francis has campaigned against the liberalisation of abortion laws in Queensland. In lobbying against 'gender selection', Francis has said that eliminating human life in its early stages for being the wrong sex, is sex discrimination. Francis has said that for Australian to use its foreign aid program to finance abortion in developing countries. which are culturally opposed to abortion, is a form of "colonialism".

Francis also supports the 'Nordic' model of prostitution legalisation – which has been described as the world's first human rights/women's rights-based legal model of prostitution legislation. The Nordic Approach does not criminalise the prostitute, but rather it criminalises the buyer – addressing the demand for prostitution, and importantly also provides women with exit strategies. Within four years of the law being implemented, the number of women involved in prostitution in Sweden halved.

In response to children being taught that they can choose their gender, Francis has had two books published entitled, "What are little boys made of?" and "What are little girls made of?" describing how a child's biological sex determines whether they are a boy or a girl, with each sex having specific X or Y chromosomes. Francis does not ignore the reality of children born with intersex conditions which, while rare, account for a number of genetic or developmental situations.

=== Centre for Human Dignity ===
Francis heads the 'Centre for Human Dignity', which was established in 2017 by ACL to advocate for rights and freedoms, particularly for vulnerable children and to stand against all forms of sexual exploitation.

== Retirement ==
Wendy Francis announced her retirement from her former role at the Australian Christian Lobby in July 2024

== Works ==
=== Books ===
- What are little girls made of? Connor Court Publishing, 2019
- What are little boys made of?, Connor Court Publishing, 2019, ISBN 978-1-925826-35-7
- Turn, Think, Tell, Connor Court Publishing, ISBN 978-1-925826-73-9
- I've Got a Secret, Connor Court Publishing, ISBN 978-1-922449-39-9

=== Opinion article ===
- Freedom – Australia’s Most Endangered Liberty, Vision Christian Radio, 2017

== See also ==
- Abortion in Australia
- Australian Catholic Bishops' Conference
- Australian Marriage Law Postal Survey
- Christianity in Australia
- Coalition for Marriage (Australia)
- Euthanasia in Australia
- FamilyVoice Australia
- Human rights in Australia
- Marriage Alliance
- Marriage in Australia
- National Organization for Marriage
