= John Gagliardi (Australian) =

Australian journalist, businessman, author and lobbyist

John Gagliardi, is an Australian journalist, businessman, author and lobbyist.

== Career ==
Gagliardi was the founding chairman of the board of directors of the Christian Outreach Centre's Christian Heritage College in Brisbane, Queensland, established in 1986.

During his media career, Galiardi was the editor of the Townsville Bulletin; Chief of Staff of National Nine TV News in Brisbane and Assistant Features Editor of The Telegraph which was for many years Brisbane's afternoon tabloid.

In 1995 he was one of the founders of the Australian Christian Lobby, then known as the Australian Christian Coalition.

Gagliardi is currently the Director of Development at the Haggai Institute, Australia.

== Works ==
Book

- The Marketplace – Our Mission

Devotional materials

- Gagliardi has produced a series of devotional materials for the City Harvest Church Singapore, entitled Breakthrough Word.

== See also ==
- Australian Christian Lobby (ACL)
  - Jim Wallace
  - Lyle Shelton
  - Wendy Francis

Party political offices
Preceded by none	director of Australian Christian Lobby; 1995–2000	Succeeded by Jim Wallace
