= Jessica Yaniv =

Canadian transgender activist

- Born: 1986 or 1987 (age 38–39)
- Other name: Jessica Simpson (legal name)
- Citizenship: Canadian
- Education: Kwantlen Polytechnic University
- Occupations: IT business support & IT reviews

Jessica Simpson (born 1986 or 1987), commonly known by her former legal name, Jessica Yaniv, is a Canadian transgender activist in British Columbia who is best known for filing at least 15 complaints of discrimination on the basis of gender identity against various beauty salons after they refused to wax her male genitalia. The complaints were filed with the British Columbia Human Rights Tribunal in 2018 and 2019. It was the first major case of alleged transgender discrimination in retail in Canada. In 2019, the Tribunal rejected her complaints and ruled Yaniv had racist motives. In following years, Yaniv has gone on to make additional complaints of discrimination, libel and privacy breach.

In 2019, she displayed a taser in a livestreamed YouTube debate with Blaire White, resulting in her arrest. Yaniv was found guilty of a charge of possession of a prohibited weapon, and sentenced to a conditional discharge, along with receiving probation and a firearms prohibition.

== Early life, education, and career ==
Yaniv was born in 1986 or 1987. She says that since she was six, she has considered herself transgender, but was afraid to be open about it. In her teens she was treated for gender identity disorder with associated depression, anxiety, and attention-deficit hyperactivity disorder.

Yaniv attended Kwantlen Polytechnic University in Surrey, British Columbia, studying computer science.

In 2008, Yaniv gained public attention when she used Facebook to call for a "National Sex Day" on August 21. As part of the campaign, she sent out free condoms on request. Over 130,000 users joined the event's Facebook group. She later revealed it was "all marketing".

Yaniv worked in call centres and tech support. That led to her creating her own business, which provided internet support to customers. She ran the business for several years under her birth name, before legally changing her first name to "Jessica", while keeping her last name. From 2012 to 2017, Yaniv worked for the American vocal group Cimorelli, managing their social media and marketing products endorsed by Cimorelli. She also acted as public relations manager for the American house music singer Chelsko.

== Activism ==
Yaniv is known in the Township of Langley for her advocacy on a number of issues before Township council. The issues she spoke on included providing feminine hygiene products, funding of her campaign for the Miss BC pageant title, and single-use plastics. Her advocacy of gender issues included seeking an end to gender-based segregation in physical education classes.

She also proposed and was an advocate for the "all-bodies swim" at a Langley township public pool. The proposed event was to be for ages 12 and up, with clothing above the waist optional, and with parents and caretakers prohibited.

== Human rights complaints and other litigation ==
=== 2018 ===
In 2018, Yaniv filed discrimination complaints with the British Columbia Human Rights Tribunal against multiple waxing salons alleging that they refused to provide genital waxing to her because she is transgender. In Canada's first major court case to deal with alleged transgender discrimination, Yaniv sought as much as $15,000 in damages from each beautician. In their defence, estheticians said they lacked training on waxing male genitalia and they were not comfortable doing so for personal or religious reasons. They further argued that being transgender was not the issue for them, rather having male genitalia was. Yaniv rejected the claim that special training in waxing male genitalia was necessary, and during the hearings equated the denial of the service to neo-Nazism. Respondents were typically working from home, were non-white, and were immigrants who did not speak English. Two of the businesses were forced to shut down due to the complaints.

In relation to Yaniv's alleged racist comments toward the respondents, she said: "Yes, I did publish 'racist remarks' because being denied services daily from the East Indian community at any business, sucks," adding: "The immigrants are targeting trans people. We are the victims, not them."

In October 2019, the Tribunal ruled against Yaniv and ordered her to pay $6,000 in restitution split equally among three of the service providers. The ruling was critical of Yaniv, with Tribunal Member Devyn Cousineau stating that she "targeted small businesses, manufactured the conditions for a human rights complaint, and then leveraged that complaint to pursue a financial settlement from parties who were unsophisticated and unlikely to mount a proper defence." She also said Yaniv had likely made respondents "feel uncomfortable or awkward for her own amusement or as a form of revenge". The Tribunal concluded that she had been financially motivated in 10 of the 13 complaints, was untruthful on the central aspect of her complaint, and had made "scurrilous attacks" on one of the respondents. The ruling also found Yaniv to be deceptive as she had used different Facebook accounts with different names and photos to engage the same esthetician. Cousineau added that Yaniv was "motivated to punish racialized and immigrant women based on her perception that certain ethnic groups, namely South Asian and Asian communities are 'taking over' and advancing an agenda hostile to the interests of LGBTQ+ people." For this reason the Tribunal ruled not only that, since none of the salons advertised waxing services for male genitals (e.g. scrotum), they did not discriminate against Yaniv on the basis of her gender identity, but also rejected the complaint regarding the refusal to wax Yaniv's arms and legs. An appeal by Yaniv against the verdict was rejected in November 2019.

The Tribunal found that the complainant's pattern of filing a large number of complaints and then withdrawing them when the respondent mounted a defence to be improper. It rejected finding that she was a vexatious litigant, rather characterizing her as a "frequent litigant". Of Yaniv, the ruling also said: "Once her identity and role in these complaints was revealed, she faced a torrent of backlash and hatred, and from that point onward was representing herself in very difficult circumstances."

=== 2019 ===
On January 7, 2020, the Justice Centre for Constitutional Freedoms (JCCF), which had represented three of the original respondents, announced it was representing another salon in an additional complaint filed by Yaniv in early October 2019. This represented the eighth case filed with the Tribunal by her, and Yaniv told CTV News that this time she believed case law was in her favour. The Tribunal ruled that any complaint by her would be deferred for six months due to her failure to pay fines imposed by the Tribunal. In September 2020, it was announced that Yaniv had dropped the complaints against two salons.

=== 2020 ===
In August 2020, Yaniv filed a new civil suit for $11,800 against three of the female beauticians involved in the Tribunal case. In an email to the National Post, she said that she paid the money owed to the beauticians in the Tribunal case, but they had failed to remove related liens placed against her; so, she had to sue to protect her assets.

Also in August 2020, Yaniv sued the Township of Langley for $35,000 over her treatment surrounding her arrest and detainment on weapons charges in 2019. She said she experienced disability discrimination, that the cells at the jail were unsanitary, and one guard failed to provide her with diabetes medication or victim services. She also said that staff harassed her by using incorrect pronouns.

In October 2020, the JCCF claimed that it was representing Canada Galaxy Pageants, a beauty pageant for women and girls, against a human rights complaint lodged by Yaniv with the Human Rights Tribunal of Ontario on the basis that she had been discriminated against based on gender identity, gender expression and sex by not being accepted as a pageant contestant in the "28 Years and Older" division. The pageant has a stated policy of accepting cisgender females and transgender females who have fully transitioned. The Western Standard reported that Yaniv sought damages in the amount of $10,000 for "injury to dignity and feelings".

=== 2021 ===
In January 2021, Yaniv announced that she had filed two complaints against the Langley Royal Canadian Mounted Police for discrimination with the Canadian Human Rights Commission.

In January 2021, Yaniv also filed small claims lawsuits in Surrey Provincial Court against Fraser Health and the Provincial Health Services Authority for allegedly breaching her personal health information in 2019, seeking $35,000 in damages and other relief.

In February 2021, the Township of Langley Fire Department wrote to Yaniv informing her that she would be charged if she contacted them again to request assistance getting out of a bath, alleging that she had summoned the Fire Department for this purpose dozens of times despite it not constituting a medical emergency and subjected Fire Department staff to "inappropriate and lewd conduct". Yaniv responded by contesting the allegations and stating that she intended to sue the Township of Langley for libel and "other things".

In April 2021, Yaniv raised a civil claim against Rebel News Network Ltd seeking an injunction, damages, and other relief to address purported harassment and defamation. In July 2022, the Supreme Court of British Columbia dismissed the claim under the Protection of Public Participation Act on the basis that it was a strategic lawsuit against public participation.

=== Impact and reactions ===
Adrienne Smith, a BC human rights lawyer, said the case with Yaniv reversed much of the success the trans community had enjoyed with the tribunal in recent times. Smith said a major problem was that Yaniv had no legal representation, which allowed Yaniv to make serious errors, such as making negative comments on social media during the proceedings, which a lawyer would have prevented. Smith said it showed a need for better Legal Aid funding, so there would be representation for cases like this.

Following the filing of the complaint, Yaniv "has become embroiled in Twitter feuds with conservative figures, appeared on the radio show of American conspiracy theorist Alex Jones, and been the subject of dozens of news articles and opinion pieces". Jones and several other media outlets had used Yaniv's case to rile their followers. The case garnered international attention, including a segment on Tucker Carlson's Fox News channel show.

Toronto Lawyer and legal academic Omar Ha-Redeye stated that "those seeking to undermine the human rights regime, or to suggest that human rights have gone too far (typically in their objections to its inclusion of gender identity and gender expression), widely utilized the news stories around this case to make their point." Ha-Redeye also stated, "This case was also notable for the public spectacle it created outside of the Tribunal. It was characterized by incredible levels of hostility".

Writing in July 2019, Arwa Mahdawi of The Guardian criticized the fact that the case had largely been covered by right-wing media, who she suggested normally were not concerned with the marginalized groups they showed concern for in the Yaniv case. Mahdawi also opined that a woman who feels uncomfortable working with a penis should not be called a bigot, as Yaniv suggested, and that such a claim "...makes a mockery of the hate crimes that are committed against trans people every day."

In the Daily Utah Chronicle, KC Ellen Cushman criticized left-wing and LGBTQ+ affirming media for their hesitancy in calling out Yaniv and other queer influencers for bad behavior, saying: "By allowing queer people who do bad things to avoid scrutiny, we make a more dangerous space for everyone in the community."

In the Toronto Star, Joanna Chiu reported that numerous transgender people had experienced a significant increase in online hate against them, as a result of coverage of the Yaniv Tribunal case. Chiu said transgender advocates "...worry the ruling could embolden transphobia, while the public loses sight of how marginalized the community still is in Vancouver."

Australian commentator Rita Panahi called the case a "twisted form of social justice" and warned that the same could eventuate in Australia where a "woman who doesn't want to touch a stranger's penis and scrotum can be slandered as a bigot, lose her livelihood and find herself before a Human Rights Tribunal." It was cited as a factor in the centre-right Liberal-National Coalition's decision to oppose a proposed gender self-identification law in Victoria, Australia and was cited by Senator Pauline Hanson in the Parliament of Australia in support of the Australian Education Legislation Amendment (Prohibiting the Indoctrination of Children) Bill 2020.

Yaniv's discrimination complaints against the waxing salons were discussed in the 2021 book Trans: When Ideology Meets Reality by journalist Helen Joyce.

== Legal issues ==
=== Weapons charge ===
Yaniv was arrested by the Langley RCMP detachment on August 8, 2019, after displaying a taser in a livestreamed YouTube video. She had been debating with transgender YouTuber Blaire White when she allegedly displayed a prohibited weapon. Commenting on the case, police noted the weapon was not directed at anyone. When police raided her home, they seized two conducted electrical weapons. Yaniv appeared in Surrey Provincial Court on January 13, 2020, to face weapons charges.

According to Mathew Claxton in the Aldergrove Star, the Surrey Court registry indicates Yaniv was found guilty of a charge of possession of a prohibited weapon, and sentenced to a conditional discharge. The Langley Advance Times reported that she received probation and a firearms prohibition.

=== Mischief and threats charges ===
In December 2020, the Western Standard reported that the Langley Royal Canadian Mounted Police had charged Yaniv with mischief and uttering threats in relation to an incident in October 2020 concerning Chris Elston.

=== Assault charge ===
In May 2022, Yaniv was found guilty of assault for physically attacking then-Rebel News journalist Keean Bexte in early 2020.

== Alleged online harassment ==
=== By Yaniv ===
According to Joseph Brean of the National Post, multiple people have accused Yaniv of harassment. This includes claims she used vulgar and sexualized language in online communications with underage girls. Yaniv has denied these allegations. One of the allegations, was by a girl from Washington State, who said that Yaniv made declarations of sexual interest over social media when the girl was 14 years old. The girl shared a recording of Yaniv with the National Post, in which Yaniv made sexual comments using the voice of Elmo from Sesame Street. In response, Yaniv said the recording was a joke, not sent to the girl, but to a friend.

=== Against Yaniv ===
In 2019, interactions on Twitter by Canadian feminist author Meghan Murphy and Jessica Yaniv resulted in Murphy being banned from Twitter. Murphy had referred to Yaniv as "him", in violation of Twitter's hate and harassment policy against misgendering. Murphy unsuccessfully sued Twitter over the ban.

Twitter also (at first permanently) banned Lindsay Shepherd, a Canadian columnist, from its platform on 14 July 2019 as a result of interactions with Yaniv. In their exchange, Yaniv said "I heard @realDonaldTrump is building a wall inside of your uterus aka your 'reproductive abnormality' hopefully the wall works as intended", to which Shepherd responded "At least I have a uterus, you fat ugly man". Twitter said that Shepherd had violated its rules against hateful content. Critics accused Twitter of "double standards" after allowing Yaniv "to go unpunished". Shepherd's Twitter account was reinstated later in July 2019.

== See also ==
- Tickle v Giggle, Australian legal case regarding rights of transgender women to women's spaces
