= Billboard Chris =

Canadian anti-transgender activist

Chris Elston
- Born: November 29, 1975 (age 50); Canada
- Other name: Billboard Chris
- Occupations: Insurance salesman (formerly); Activist
- Years active: 2020–present
- Known for: Opposing gender-affirming care for transgender youth
- Political party: BC Conservative Party (before 2026); OneBC (2026–present)
- Children: 2

Chris Elston, also known as Billboard Chris, is a Canadian conservative anti-transgender activist, best known for his public opposition to medical and social gender transition for minors. Elston is known for filming public interactions he has while wearing sandwich boards with statements pertaining to transgender identity, such as one opposing to using puberty blockers in gender-affirming care for transgender youth, in contradiction to the recommendations of major medical organizations around the world. (Note: Elston's views on puberty blockers are in contradiction to the recommendations of major medical organizations around the world including the Canadian Pediatric Society, the Endocrine Society, the American Medical Association, the American Psychological Association, the American Academy of Pediatrics, the Royal Australasian College of Physicians, the Royal Australian College of General Practitioners and the Australian Endocrine Society, among others, which support the use of puberty blockers and gender-affirming care for trans youth.) He then publishes the recordings on social media without the person's consent. As of 2025, Elston has been arrested several times in multiple countries.

Elston has been accused of spreading misinformation about gender affirming care and has collaborated with many conservative and anti-trans groups including: Moms for Liberty, Alliance Defending Freedom, Gays Against Groomers, Genspect, Do No Harm, Independent Women's Forum (IWF), and the Heritage Foundation and is a prominent figure in the anti-LGBTQ parental rights movement.

The Canadian Anti-Hate Network has described Elston as one of the "most prominent anti-trans activists" in Canada.

== Background ==
Elston began learning about gender-affirming care for minors in 2019, saying he became interested in the topic when he saw the term 'puberty blockers' and thought "What the heck are those?" In September 2020, he began traveling around the world, frequently to schools, hospitals, legislative buildings, university campuses and public events, including pro-trans events, wearing sandwich boards with statements like "Children cannot consent to puberty blockers" and "I love J.K. Rowling" on them and then engaging with individuals in public conversations about the subject which he films and uploads to social media without the person's consent. (Note: See:) He claims to have been frequently assaulted as a result of these activities. According to a woman interviewed by CTV News who encountered Elston at a Transgender Day of Visibility rally which he was counter-protesting at in 2023, "He [Elston] bills himself as this calm dude who just wants to sit down and have a conversation with you, but he will go up to you and ask you things like, 'Why do you support mutilating children? Why are you a pedophile? Why do you support pedophiles?'"

Elston's views on puberty blockers are in contradiction to the recommendations of major medical organizations around the world, including the Canadian Paediatric Society, the Endocrine Society, the American Medical Association, the American Psychological Association, the American Academy of Pediatrics, the Royal Australasian College of Physicians, the Royal Australian College of General Practitioners and the Australian Endocrine Society, among others, which support the use of puberty blockers and gender-affirming care for trans youth.

== Activities ==
In 2020, after J.K. Rowling began making her views on transgender issues more public, Elston and a friend of his paid to have a large billboard put up above Hastings Street in Vancouver to show support for Rowling's views. The billboard was taken down following backlash. Elston claims to have borrowed the idea from a UK anti-trans activist who had put up the same message on posters at Edinburgh Station. According to Vancouver city councillor, Sarah Kirby-Yung, Elston's billboards were intended to "stoke hate, exclusion and division". Following the removal of his billboard in Vancouver, Elston paid for 15 billboards across the United States to display the message.

After BC provincial Green Party candidate and trans woman, Nicola Spurling, raised concerns about Elston's wife being a schoolteacher given his activism, Elston showed up at her home, took pictures of her house and posted it on social media along with her name, address, email and phone number.

In August 2022, Elston, along with Libs of TikTok and other prominent right-wing social media influencers, circulated a variety of false allegations about Boston Children's Hospital's program for treating trans youth, including claiming that the hospital was offering gender-affirming surgeries to youth under 18. The misinformation led to a wave of harassment and threats again the hospital and its employees.

In June 2023, Elston was a speaker at the Moms for Liberty National Summit and moderated a session about "gender ideology" and how to fight it.

In July 2023, Elston teamed up with Moms for Liberty to hold a protest outside of the Rainbow Room, an LGBTQ youth center in Doylestown, Pennsylvania, calling it "groomer central". Melissa Reed, president and CEO of Planned Parenthood Keystone said "Elston's comments at the rally denying that LGBTQ people even exist are dangerous".

In early 2025, Elston was invited to the White House to witness President Trump sign Executive Order 14201, which aims to ban transgender youth from participating in school sports that align with their gender identity.

In April 2025, Elston held an anti-trans rally in Ontario with Randy Hillier, Maxime Bernier and the far-right People's Party of Canada.

In June 2025, Elston and Lois McLatchie Miller, a Scottish woman who works for the Alliance Defending Freedom, were arrested in Brussels. The two were accused of causing disruptive behaviour while holding signs that read "Children are never born in the wrong body."

== Arrests and charges ==
As of 2025, Elston has been arrested several times in multiple countries and charged with five cases of harassment. (Note: See:) He has also been arrested for "causing a disturbance" and accused by police of "instigating" for walking into a crowd and "antagonizing other protestors and even attempting to punch someone" and not stopping after being warned several times by police.

== Views ==
Elston strongly opposes gender-affirming care and supports banning it for all ages, including adults.

Elston believes "there is no such thing as an LGBTQ community", claiming that transgender identities are a mental illness and equates the "Q" in LGBTQ with an ideological attempt at normalising pedophilia. He believes young people are being indoctrinated into identifying as transgender and has also criticized human rights organizations for supporting transgender rights. He also views the transgender community as a "quasi-religious" movement.

Elston believes there is no such thing as gender identities and denies that trans and queer people exist. He has also accused queer theory of being a "radical left ideology that wants to take everything that we've considered normal and traditional and destroy that, and take everything that's depraved and perverted and normalize that instead."

Elston believes that trans people should be "automatically disqualified from holding any position as teacher or professor."

Elston strongly opposes bans on conversion therapy for trans youth.

While critical of the broader LGBTQ movement, Elston has expressed support for gay people and argued that transgender rights are harming gay people and likened gender-affirming care to conversion therapy of kids who are actually just gay.

== Personal life ==
Elston resides in British Columbia, Canada and has two daughters. His wife works as a school teacher in Surrey. Prior to his anti-trans activism, Elston worked as an insurance salesman. In 2023, Elston claimed to have quit his job to focus on "saving children from transgender ideology".

Elston claimed in 2025 that, despite attending church regularly for almost 25 years, he identifies as agnostic.

In September 2026, Elston left the BC Conservative Party and joined the far-right OneBC party, claiming it to be the "only true conservative party".

Elston claims to have had "a brief stint" with Scientology in the 1990s before fleeing the cult. Before pivoting to anti-trans activism, Elston focused on criticizing Scientology on social media.

== Australian cyber abuse ruling ==
In March 2024, the Australian online ESafety Commissioner, Julie Inman Grant, ordered that X remove a post by Elston about an Australian trans man, Teddy Cook, who is employed as an LGBTQ health expert. The post was a link to a Daily Mail article criticizing Cook and his role assisting in writing LGBTQ healthcare guidelines for the World Health Organization (WHO). Part of Elston’s post stated that "people who belong in psychiatric wards are writing the guidelines for people who belong in psychiatric wards."

Determining this post to be cyber-abuse and therefore in breach of Australia's Online Safety Act, Commissioner Grant declared that the post had misgendered Cook, mocked his gender identity and equated transgender identity with a psychiatric condition, saying it singles out Cook for his transgender identity whilst "deliberately suggesting that all transgender people have something that is 'wrong' about their psychology owing to their gender identity" and "equating transgender identity with a psychiatric condition." Elston responded by saying he holds no contempt for Cook whilst again misgendering him and denying the existence of gender identities.

Following this, Elon Musk vowed to sue Australia for violating free speech on X. Elston partnered with the conservative organization Alliance Defending Freedom, and the Australian Christian Lobby's Human Rights Law Alliance to file a lawsuit. Subsequently in 2025, the United States Department of State issued a statement in support of Elston.

In May 2024, Elston was a speaker at a rally for the far-right One Nation Party in Sydney, Australia where he spoke about his lawsuit.

In July 2025, a tribunal in Melbourne overturned the government order to remove the post.
