= Coalition for Marriage (Australia) =

Australian lobby group

- Formation: 1 August 2017; 9 years ago
- Legal status: Active
- Website: www.coalitionformarriage.com.au

The Coalition for Marriage was an Australian lobby group that advocated the definition of marriage as being between a man and a woman, as found in the now superseded Marriage Amendment Act 2004.

== Campaigning ==
The organisation had a lead role in lobbying for the "No" case - associated with the Australian Marriage Law Postal Survey. Other organisations partnering with the Coalition for Marriage, in opposition to same-sex marriage, include the Australian Catholic Bishops' Conference, the Australian Christian Lobby and Marriage Alliance.

The first Coalition for Marriage advertisement on TV featured three women and focused on the Safe Schools education program. In the ad, the women – Heidi McIvor, Cella White, and Pansy Lai – ask about potential gender confusion issues for children. The ad was supported by Conservative senator Cory Bernardi and by social commentator Andrew Bolt. The ad was criticised as being inaccurate and for linking the survey (and same-sex marriage in general) to Safe Schools, and by Opposition Leader, Bill Shorten who said, "Malcolm Turnbull ... gave the green light to this rubbish". Mothers of transgender children criticised the ad for bringing their children into the same-sex marriage debate. The three women and supporters of the yes position have all commented on the responses to the ad. Minister for Environment and Energy Josh Frydenberg expressed that he "did not have a problem" with the advertisement, stating that he has "great confidence in the public's ability to make their own decisions as to whether they'll be voting yes or no".

One of the women in the ad (Dr Lai) was threatened that she would be shot “this week” and a campaign was initiated (subsequently pulled) to revoke her medical registration.

== Partners ==
The Coalition for Marriage works with:
- Anglican Diocese of Sydney
- Australian Christian Lobby
- Assembly of Confessing Congregations (Uniting Church in Australia)
- Australian Baptist Ministries
- Australian Family Association
- C3 Church
- Roman Catholic Archdiocese of Hobart
- Roman Catholic Archdiocese of Sydney
- Roman Catholic Diocese of Broken Bay
- Christian Reformed Churches of Australia
- CRC Churches International
- Endeavour Forum
- FamilyVoice Australia
- Greek Orthodox Archdiocese of Australia
- Marriage Alliance
- National Civic Council

Overseas

- Coalition for Marriage (UK)
- National Organization for Marriage
- World Congress of Families

== See also ==
- Australian Catholic Bishops' Conference
