= Christian Democratic Party (Australia) =

Political party in Australia

- Leader: Fred Nile
- Federal President: Fred Nile
- Christian Youth President: Samraat Joshua Grewal
- Founded: 1977
- Dissolved: 29 March 2022
- Succeeded by: Revive Australia
- Youth wing: Christian Youth
- Ideology: Conservatism (Australian); Social conservatism; Christian right
- Political position: Right-wing
- Religion: Christianity
- Colours: Orange (official); Purple (customary)
- House of Representatives: 1 / 148 (1998)
- NSW Legislative Council: 2 / 42 (multiple occasions)
- Constitutional Convention: 1 / 152 (1998)

Website
- Christian Democratic Party (archived)

The Christian Democratic Party (CDP) was a political party in Australia, founded in 1977, under the name Call to Australia Party, by a group of Christian ministers in New South Wales. One of the co-founders, Fred Nile, a Congregational Church minister, ran as their upper house candidate in the NSW State election. The Christian Democratic Party's platform espoused social conservatism. It changed its name in 1998.

The party was primarily active in New South Wales and, after the 1981 NSW state election, had at least one member in that state's Legislative Council, often holding or sharing the balance of power. The Christian Democrats never succeeded in having a member elected to federal parliament, although John Bradford briefly sat with the party in the House of Representatives after defecting from the Liberal Party before the 1998 federal election.

In 2011, the Victorian and Western Australian branches of the CDP voted to form a new party, leading to the creation of the Australian Christians in those states. In June 2021, it was reported that the Christian Democratic Party had gone into receivership. On 17 March 2022, the federal branch of the party was deregistered by the AEC because it did not meet membership number requirements. On 29 March 2022, the Supreme Court of NSW dissolved the party.

== History ==
=== Formation ===
Originally established as the "Call to Australia Party" in 1977, the CDP was founded by a group of Christian ministers, and Fred Nile ran as their candidate. These groups had sought to mobilise conservative and evangelical Protestants as an electoral force. Nile was elected to the New South Wales Legislative Council in 1981 and the party managed to get a candidate elected at every subsequent New South Wales election until the 2019 state election.

An earlier party called the 'Christian Democrat Party' contested the 1980 federal election in the seat of Northern Territory and the Senate.

=== Retirement of Elaine Nile and election of Gordon Moyes ===
In August 2000, it was announced that Elaine Nile would retire due to ill health and be replaced by John Bradford, a former Liberal member of the Australian House of Representatives from Queensland who had defected to the CDP before being defeated at the 1998 Federal election. However, this fell through due to disagreements between Fred and Elaine Nile and Bradford. Elaine Nile served until 2002, at which time she was replaced by Gordon Moyes of Sydney's Wesley Central Mission. Moyes was elected in his own right at the 2003 NSW election.

In 2004, Moyes suggested Nile make a bid for a Senate seat at the 2004 federal election. In that election, Nile achieved 2.6% of the primary vote, but narrowly missed attaining a seat. Another rival conservative party, Family First, won a seat in Victoria with 1.9% and a better preference deal.

During the 2007 New South Wales state election, the CDP called for a moratorium on Muslim immigration to Australia, seeking to replace them with "persecuted Christians from the Middle East". Nile said the moratorium should be in place to allow a study of the effects of Muslim migration. "There has been no serious study of the potential effects upon Australia of more than 300,000 Muslims who are already here," he said. "Australians deserve a breathing space so the situation can be carefully assessed before Islamic immigration can be allowed to resume. In the meantime, Australia should extend a welcoming hand to many thousands of persecuted Christians who are presently displaced or at risk in the Middle East." Nile and another CDP candidate Allan Lotfizadeh reported receiving death threats on account of this announcement.

Fred Nile was re-elected to the New South Wales Legislative Council on 24 March 2007, achieving a vote of 4.4%, the highest for the CDP since 1988.

=== Battle between Nile and Moyes ===
In 2007, the President of the Legislative Council, Meredith Anne Burgmann, retired from public service and the Council sought a replacement. Tensions flared when both Moyes and Nile applied for the position. Nile subsequently withdrew his application and nominated Moyes at Moyes' behest. Peter Primrose was confirmed President on 8 March 2007, Moyes having received only two votes, Nile's and his own. After Nile was made Assistant Deputy President on 28 June 2007 and then Assistant President 28 November 2007, Moyes began to publicly attack Nile.

Moyes argued that Nile's anti-homosexual, anti-abortion and anti-Muslim focus should be altered and that greater emphasis be placed on environmental issues. In contrast to Nile, Moyes inferred that the burden of responsibility for Islamic terrorism lay at the feet of western civilisation, the "Crusades" and the "excesses of the 'war on terrors'.

Moyes (then aged 70 years) claimed Nile (then aged 75 years) was too old and was too "committed to gaining money and status, and [...attacked...] any who disagree[d] with himself". According to Moyes, Nile was a pathetic figure who has never laughed, has no friends, is a workaholic, has no interests or hobbies, eats fast-food meals and when in Sydney attending Parliament, spends every night alone in a cheap motel in western Sydney.

In February 2009, Nile wrote in his monthly newsletter that he regretted allowing Moyes to take his wife's place upon her retirement "because of his disloyalty and divisive actions and his frequent support of the Greens". Moyes stated that the Greens were "far more Christian".

Moyes also attacked the Christian Democratic Party itself, stating that the party was a cult, a hypocritical, anti-Christian, anti-democratic dictatorship that adhered to the values of extremist fundamentalism. Moyes claimed that the "end was nigh" for the party as there was a conspiracy to disband the party and form a new conservative Christian political party. Moyes attempted to draw Nile's parliamentary staff into the conflict by making claims that they had intimidated and bullied his own. Moyes ignored repeated warnings from the CDP management committee, claiming that they were dysfunctional: calling the committee "sad, mad, senile and aggressively ambitious." As a result, Moyes was expelled from the Christian Democratic Party in March 2009 by secret ballot of its members. Moyes became an independent for several months before joining the Family First Party in 2009. Moyes failed in his attempt to be re-elected at the 2011 state election.

=== 2019 leadership challenges ===
On the third of June 2019, Samraat Joshua Grewal announced that he had seized control of the Christian Democratic Party and removed the Party's Board following a vote of no confidence at a Party State Council which had passed unanimously after half the membership vacated the meeting. This included the Party's leader Rev Fred Nile, who is a longtime member of the New South Wales Parliament. This was allegedly done in an attempt to reform the Party. Subsequently, it was announced that he had established a Directional Committee, leaving the party with two competing Board of Directors to investigate internal party breaches of Electoral Commission regulations. In the following weeks, there were allegations made that the Party's State President Ross Clifford had been bullying party members and staff of Morling Theological College of which he is Principal.

In the following weeks, it was confirmed that the Party had been involved in high level breaches of Government Regulations. The Party's State Director Craig Hall said that 'The Party needed to change if it was to survive,' and that the Party's deficient Constitution was being changed by the orders of Government Regulators. By August, it was announced that the Party would have a re-vote of the motion. At this time a former State Director of the Party, Greg Bondar commented that the re-vote would give the membership an opportunity to set a new direction for the Party and its leaders. Eternity News reported that the coup by Samraat was partially instigated by succession issues, such as when Fred Nile allegedly reneged on a promise to hand over his parliamentary seat to Ross Clifford, Principal of the Baptist Morling College, resulting in the party losing 80 branches in a year, including four interstate organisations.

By the end of August 2019, the party had concluded its re-vote of the no-confidence motion which was defeated. Criticisms were made about the secret ballot requiring names to be written on them. In addition, claims were made that the Party Executive moved a motion to prevent Samraat from addressing the membership. In November 2019, it was announced that the Party President Ross Clifford had resigned his position, confirming the mismanagement claims made by Samraat and other party members.

In September 2020, the party's treasurer Charles Knox filed a lawsuit against Fred Nile and his wife Silvana Nero-Nile for allegedly claiming $100,000 of party funds for their own use.

=== Retirement of Fred Nile ===
On 12 April 2021 Fred Nile announced that he would be retiring from parliament in November, and named Lyle Shelton as a candidate to replace his seat in the Legislative Council. Nile withdrew his endorsement of Shelton in September 2021 due to "irreconcilable differences" between the two, and announced that he would remain in parliament until 2023 to complete his parliamentary term.

== Schism and dissolution of CDP ==
However, following several years of animosity between Fred Nile and members of the Christian Democratic Party board of management, the party went into receivership in April 2021. In March 2022, Fred Nile abandoned the Christian Democratic Party and sat in the New South Wales Legislative Council as the MLC for the Seniors United Party of Australia. The party was subsequently taken off the Australian federal register of political parties due to having insufficient membership.

== Ideology and policies ==
The Christian Democratic Party exists to support Christian representation in every level of government – federal, state and local – and to promote "ethical values based on...Christian values".

The party is supportive of family values (including traditional marriage), freedom of speech, protective of children and their rights including those of unborn children, and policies that are protective of established Australian values and systems, inclusive of a requirement that immigrants to Australia demonstrate a desire to learn English. They are opposed to both abortion and euthanasia as well as pornography, drug decriminalisation and sharia law. The party's leader, Fred Nile, has said homosexuality is a "mental disorder".

=== Law and order ===
The CDP supports rehabilitation of criminals when possible. They seek "a wisely governed penal system that seeks to restore convicted persons where possible to good contributors to society."

=== Economy and housing ===
CDP's policy on the economy is to ensure "a healthy environment for business to start and grow". They support an adequately "remunerated job" to allow for "a balance between work and non-work times" and have an emphasis on "the financial well-being of each person in [the] community". In 2015, Nile supported the Liberal government's privatisation of electricity infrastructure, such as poles and wires.

=== Education and health ===
The Christian Democratic Party believe that parental input in a child's education plus writing, reading and arithmetic are the basis of a good education system. They also support Special Religious Education (SRE). CDP believes that Health Care "should be available, accessible and affordable".

=== Environment and social security ===
According to their 2018 policies, the CDP supports a balanced approach to both environment and social security. They seek a "good and sustainable use of the earth" and social security for "those who genuinely need it".

=== Employment, immigration, and infrastructure ===
The CDP is for local industry and local jobs and "proactively [work] to advocate for jobs growth". Their policy on immigration reads: "Each nation needs to manage its immigration so that there is a balance of visitors and immigrants that will contribute positively to the nation. In the last several years we have seen a rise in immigration that has outpaced infrastructure and potentially affecting housing affordability, health affordability, and employment declines, and a strain on the social security system resulting in community disquiet towards some new immigrants. This has the potential to change the character of the Australian society. Immigration needs to be carefully managed, taken on the advice of demographic experts and not growth economics." The Christian Democrats also support strong infrastructure programs for roads, bridges, hospitals, airports, waterways and power supplies. They state that these should be "steady and affordable" and planned for "future generations", not simply as short-term goals.

== Controversies ==
The party and a candidate, Peter Madden, came under intense opposition from their policies and political campaign actions by the Returned and Services League of Australia (RSL). Their campaign to have the Sydney Mardi Gras banned because of, as he puts it, "the lifestyle and perversion that it promotes" saw opposition from the RSL as one of their campaign YouTube videos, which featured Madden, labelled a "battle cry", calls upon "10,000 warriors" to rally against the event and shows Madden in front of the Anzac War Memorial in Hyde Park inviting viewers to become "lions" and join him. The NSW RSL president, Don Rowe, said that returned servicemen and women and the public as a whole find it "totally offensive" that anyone would use the image of the War Memorial to make a political statement. Don Rowe said to The Sydney Morning Herald, "I am neither a supporter nor a detractor of the Mardi Gras and the RSL has no official position on it, but we totally disapprove of the use of the War Memorial in a politicised way. It is a sacred site and symbolises those Australians who made the ultimate sacrifice for this country and for our freedoms … not for someone trying to make a political stand."

Peter Madden was also criticised by the LGBT community when he called for the Sydney Gay and Lesbian Mardi Gras to be "moved off the streets".’ and stated in an interview with Glenn Wheeler and Anthony Venn-Brown on the Sydney radio station 2GB that one of the main objectives of the Sydney Gay and Lesbian Mardi Gras was "recruitment".

== Electoral outcomes ==
The CDP has built a small but stable electoral base among Catholics, Eastern Orthodox and Protestants, as well as religious minorities, in New South Wales, particularly in the "Bible Belt" suburbs of north-western Sydney and in some country areas, but the CDP has only achieved modest results in its attempts to expand its electoral base further. The party has comparable support in Western Australia (which broke away to form the Australian Christians party) but has lacked similar representation in its state parliament because its seats have higher election quotas.

The Christian Democratic Party sees the policies of the major parties as an attack on their traditional views. Gordon Moyes (no longer a member of the party) explained, "Our Christian heritage is under attack from pagan and secularist forces, militant Islamic groups, a neo communism under a Green guise and a strident homosexual lobby that has successfully gained the support of the Labor Party, Australian Democrats and the Greens, and many from the left of the Liberal Party."

For the 1983 federal election, the CDP formed an alliance with the Victoria-based Democratic Labor Party. They did not win any seats and contested subsequent elections separately.

The Christian Democratic Party generally had two (sometimes three) sitting members in the New South Wales Legislative Council at any one time. Usually, these two individuals have been Nile and one other member. At the 1984 New South Wales state election Nile was joined by former Liberal politician Jim Cameron. Cameron retired shortly after being elected, due to serious health problems, and was replaced by Marie Bignold. Nile's wife, Elaine Nile, joined her husband and Bignold at the Legislative Council at the 1988 New South Wales state election. Bignold subsequently had a falling out with Fred and Elaine Nile over Bignold's opposition to the Liberal Party stance on industrial relations; a policy position supported by the Niles. The restructuring of the Legislative Council in 1991 meant that Bignold's seat was abolished and she was forced to an early election; but she failed in her bid for re-election.

The party was involved in Glenn Druery's Minor Party Alliance.

Paul Green was elected to the New South Wales Legislative Council at the 2011 state election, aged 45 years at the time of this election. He failed to be re-elected in the 2019 election. This was the first NSW Legislative Council election that the party failed to get any candidates elected since its founding.

== Members of parliament and other elected representatives ==
=== Federal ===
==== House of Representatives ====
- John Bradford (1998)

=== New South Wales ===
==== Legislative Council ====
- Fred Nile (1981–2004; 2004–2022)
- Jim Cameron (1984)
- Marie Bignold (1984–1988)
- Elaine Nile (1988–2002)
- Gordon Moyes (2002–2009)
- Paul Green (2011–2019)

==== Penrith City Council ====
- Maurice Girotto (2016)

==== Shoalhaven City Council ====
- Paul Green (until 2012)

==== Uralla Shire Council ====
- Isabel Strutt (2006–2012)

== Electoral performance ==
=== Senate ===
Election	Votes	%	Δ%	Seats won	Rank
1990	136,522	1.37	−0.09	0 / 76	▲5th
1993	108,938	1.02	−0.35	0 / 76	5th
1996	117,274	1.08	+0.06	0 / 76	▼6th
1998	122,516	1.09	+0.01	0 / 76	6th
2001	129,966	1.12	+0.03	0 / 76	6th
2004	140,674	1.18	+0.06	0 / 76	▼7th
2007	118,614	0.94	−0.24	0 / 76	7th
2010	127,894	1.01	+0.07	0 / 76	▼9th
2013	72,544	0.54	−0.47	0 / 76	▼15th
2016	162,155	1.17	+0.63	0 / 76	▲10th
2019	94,301	0.65	−0.52	0 / 76	▼13th

=== New South Wales ===
Legislative Council
Election year	# of overall votes	% of overall vote	# of seats won	# of overall seats	+/–	Notes
1981	248,425	9.11%	1 / 15	1 / 44	▲1	
1984	175,068	6.09%	1 / 15	2 / 45	▲1	
1988	173,569	5.74%	1 / 15	3 / 45	▲1	
1991	114,648	3.58%	1 / 21	2 / 42	Steady	
1995	101,556	3.01%	1 / 21	2 / 42	Steady	
1999	112,699	3.17%	1 / 21	2 / 42	Steady	
2003	112,865	3.03%	1 / 21	2 / 42	Steady	
2007	168,545	4.42%	1 / 21	2 / 42	Steady	
2011	127,233	3.12%	1 / 21	2 / 42	Steady	
2015	126,305	2.93%	1 / 21	2 / 42	Steady	
2019	101,328	2.28%	0 / 21	1 / 42	▼1	

== See also ==
- Christian politics in Australia
- Australian Christians
- Australian Marriage Law Postal Survey
- Family First Party

== Bibliography ==
- Fred Nile: Autobiography: Sydney: Strand Publishing: 2001: ISBN 1-876825-79-0
