= Family First Party (2021) =

Political party in Australia

- Abbreviation: FFP; FF
- Leader: Lyle Shelton
- Chairperson: Tom Kenyon
- Founders: Jack Snelling; Tom Kenyon
- Founded: 28 July 2021; 5 years ago
- Preceded by: Family First (2002)
- Headquarters: Chatswood, Sydney, New South Wales
- Ideology: Conservatism (Australian); Social conservatism
- Political position: Right-wing
- House of Representatives: 0 / 150
- Senate: 0 / 76
- State and territory lower houses: 0 / 465
- State and territory upper houses: 2 / 156

Website
- familyfirstparty.org.au

The Family First Party (FFP or FF) is a conservative political party in Australia. It was founded in 2021 by former state Labor ministers Jack Snelling and Tom Kenyon. As of March 2022, the former managing director of the Australian Christian Lobby (ACL), Lyle Shelton is the party's National Director. Opposing abortion and euthanasia are regarded as some of the party's key policies.

== History ==
=== Original Family First Party ===
The Family First Party previously existed as a political party in Australia, founded in 2002 by Andrew Evans, who won a seat in the South Australian Legislative Council at the state election that year. In 2017 it merged with the Australian Conservatives which dissolved in 2019.

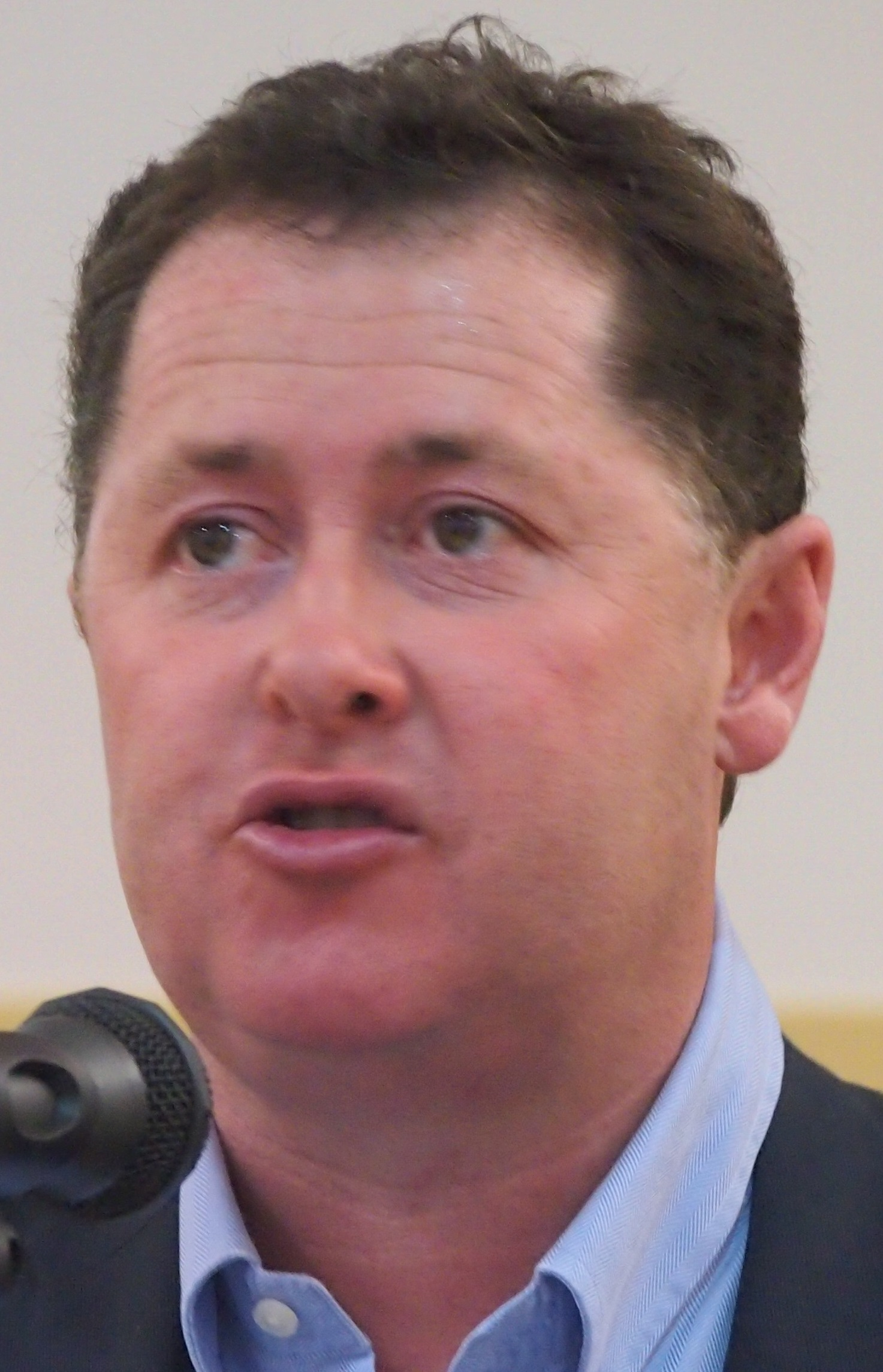
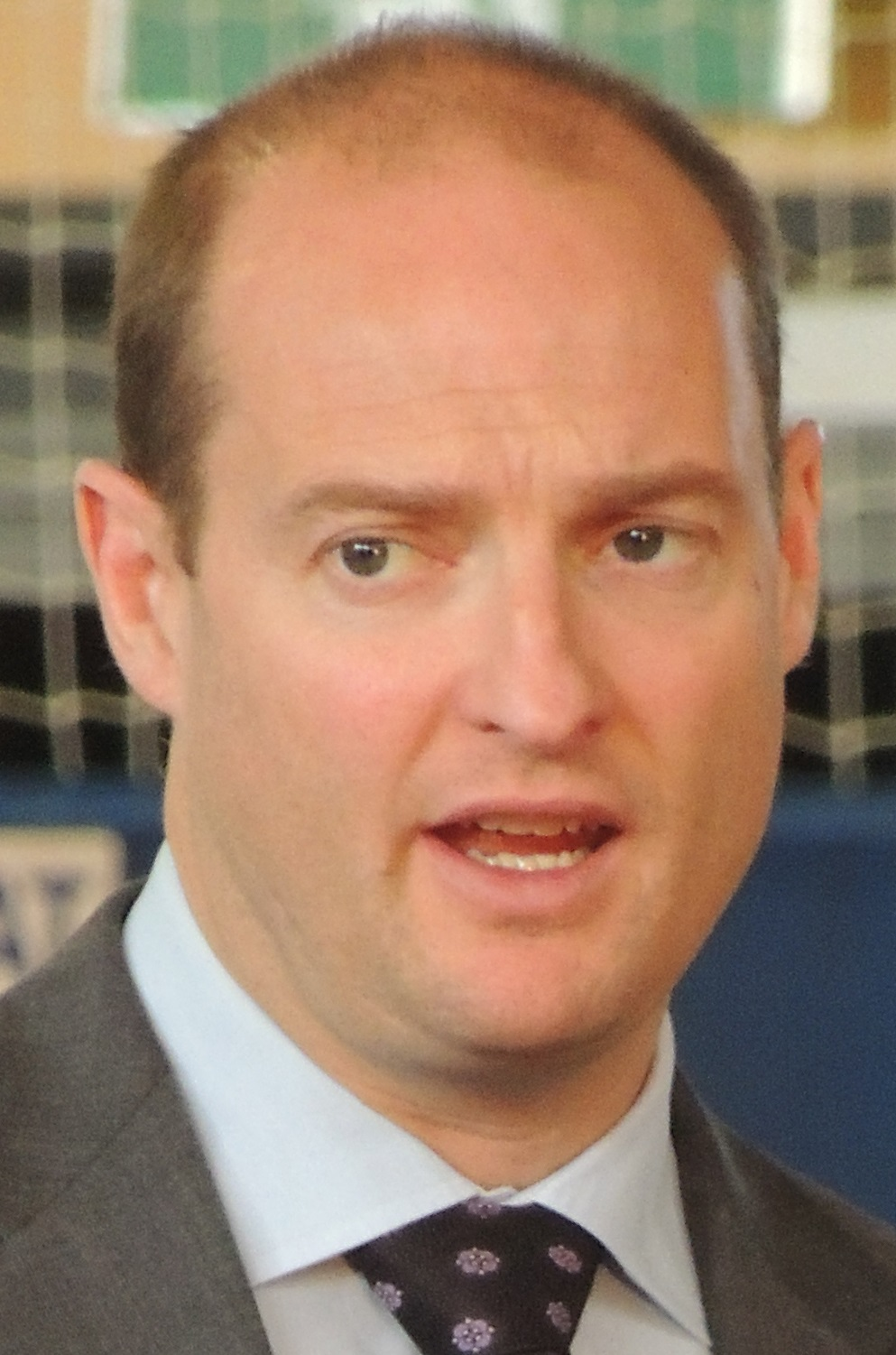
Jack Snelling (left) and Tom Kenyon (right) established the Family First Party on 28 July 2021.

=== Party formation ===
On 28 July 2021, Jack Snelling and Tom Kenyon both left the Labor Party, forming the Family First Party. Snelling said that he was the chairman of an incorporated association called "Family First Party" which was not yet registered as a political party. He said that "I have had no discussions with anybody in the ALP", and that he had not discussed the decision to form Family First with either party leader Peter Malinauskas or Labor's state executive.

Snelling claimed that "we have the support of some of the founding members of Family First including Andrew Evans". Evans said that "I don't mind them doing it. It puts a brake on the major parties", but added that he would not be involved in the new party as "I've done my bit". Former Family First senator Bob Day, who had formed the Australian Family Party in 2020, was not supportive, noting the founders' history with the Labor Party. Former Senator and leader of the Australian Conservatives, Cory Bernardi, said of Family First that he would "cheer them on", and that he had released intellectual property associated with the former Family First name to the new party. The party also acquired the old Family First's "data base of about 6000 supporters".

Commentators noted that the Liberal Marshall government in South Australia was led by moderates who had supported reforms relating to abortion and euthanasia. Snelling said that "we are very concerned about religious freedom and attempts to restrict that freedom", and that "I think that particularly in the last few years the political environment has shifted significantly in both the major parties where you simply cannot prosecute arguments about religious liberty". In particular he cited "moves to restrict the rights of hospitals and clinicians to refuse to participate in abortions and euthanasia" as a concern. It was reported that "former Family First insiders" believed that the new party was formed with the intent of taking marginal seats from the Liberal Party in northeastern Adelaide.

A few days later Deepa Mathew, who ran for the Liberal Party in the seat of Enfield at the 2018 South Australian state election, became the first prominent Liberal Party member to join Family First. Mathew claimed that the Liberal Party was "introducing legislation that is a serious threat to the very fabric of our society and families, especially around individual's and organisations' freedom to be able to conscientious object based on your beliefs". Federal Liberal MP for Boothby, Nicolle Flint, called Mathew's defection a "big loss for the Liberal Party", and that she was "deeply saddened to learn that Deepa was leaving the Liberal Party – I firmly believe if you want to change things do it from within".

The party was registered by the Electoral Commission of South Australia on 13 January 2022.

=== Since 2022 ===
On 27 May 2022, the party announced the appointment of former Australian Christian Lobby boss Lyle Shelton as their National Director.

In 2023, former Victorian state Liberal MP Bernie Finn joined the party.

In May 2024, the party was registered in Queensland and Australian Capital Territory.

In September 2024, the party gained its first elected member when Australian Capital Territory Legislative Assembly member Elizabeth Kikkert joined the party, after being disendorsed by the Canberra Liberals. She lost her seat one month later at the 2024 ACT election.

The party also ran in the 2024 Queensland state election in October 2024.

In June 2026, Sarah Game member of the South Australian Legislative Council since 2022 joined the party. She left her own political party to join Family First.

In September 2026, Moira Deeming member of the Victorian Legislative Council since 2022, announced she would join the Family First Party. She will also be a candidate for the Western Metropolitan Region in the 2026 state election.

== Ideology ==
The Family First Party is a conservative party founded on a Judeo-Christian-right platform. The party opposes abortion and is opposed to LGBTQ+ content in schools. As part of the party's core values it states that it "believes human life begins at conception and should be protected from that moment until natural death". The party wants to ban gender affirmation surgery while encouraging married couples to have children. Furthermore, the Family First Party opposes same-sex marriage. It wants to repeal same-sex marriage laws in Australia and restore "marriage as the union of one man and one woman—for life, and for the benefit of children".

== Policies ==
- Abolish anti-vilification and anti-discrimination laws
- Criminalise men who purchase consensual sex from women
- Ban trans women from women's spaces and women's sports
- Continue the war on drugs
- Close supervised injection sites
- "Encourage and incentivise monogamous, heterosexual marriage"
- Enforce an online age verification system
- Cut funding to events such as the 2023 Sydney World Pride Festival
- End net zero targets
- Abolish renewable subsidies
- Remove all restrictions and penalties on diesel vehicles
- Retain all coal fired power stations
- Withdraw Australia from the Paris Agreement
- Continue the use of coal and increase the use of gas in Australia and end restrictions on the exploration of gas
- Reduce government spending, reduce the size of government and reduce government regulation of the economy
- Support chaplaincies in schools
- The party states it is "pro-life"
- Ban sex-selective abortions
- Ban late term abortions
- Criminalise euthanasia
- Ban surrogacy
- Abolish the Australian Human Rights Commission

== Electoral performance ==
=== Queensland ===
The party contested the 2024 Queensland state election, The party failed to win any seats, obtaining 1.8% of the vote.

=== Australian Capital Territory ===
==== 2024 ====
The party contested the 2024 Australian Capital Territory election, The party failed to win any seats, obtaining 2.4% of the vote.

=== New South Wales ===
==== 2023 ====
The party, unregistered in New South Wales, ran in the 2023 New South Wales state election for the Legislative Council as a group list with Lyle Shelton. The group list got 1.1% with 58,361 votes.

=== Victoria ===
==== 2022 ====
The party contested the Victorian state election. Family First Victoria was registered as a political party with the Victorian Electoral Commission as of 6 October 2022.

The party ran in all 88 seats of the Victorian House of Assembly and all seats in the Legislative Council. They failed to win any seats, obtaining 3.05% of the vote in the lower house, and 2.01% of the vote in the upper house.

After the state election, The party ran in the 2023 Narracan state by election getting 2.9%, the 2023 Warrandyte state by-election getting 2.8%, and the 2023 Mulgrave state by-election getting 3.1%.

=== South Australia ===
==== 2022 ====
The party ran candidates in the 2022 South Australian state election. Initially, Family First said it aimed to run in all 47 seats of the South Australian House of Assembly. Snelling did not intend to run, but Kenyon was reported to be considering candidacy.

When candidate lists were finalised, Family First had candidates in 34 seats, and three candidates (Tom Kenyon, Deepa Mathew and Craig Bowyer) for the Legislative Council. At the election, the party received 3.7% of the primary vote in the Lower House and 3.05% in the Upper House, and were not successful in getting any candidate elected. Their highest vote was in the seat of Ramsay with 11.4% – a 6.9% swing to the party.

Tom Kenyon, the party's Chairman, reflected on Family First's results after the election: “Our primary goal was to unseat bad members in the lower house, to get a better parliament, and show that we can move the Christian vote around.”

“The life and freedom vote moved about five to ten per cent in a whole bunch of seats, and that counts,” he said. “I don’t think they can discount us now.”

==== 2026 ====
The party ran candidates in the 2026 South Australian state election. At the election, the party received 1.7% of the primary vote in the Lower House (a 2% decrease) and 2.1% in the Upper House (a 1% decrease), and were not successful in getting any candidate elected.
