= Human Rights Law Alliance =

Body associated with the Australian Christian Lobby (ACL)

- Location: Canberra, Australia
- Region served: Australia
- Managing Director: John Steenhof
- Consulting Barrister: Christopher Brohier
- Parent organization: Australian Christian Lobby
- Website: www.hrla.org.au

The Human Rights Law Alliance is a body associated with the Australian Christian Lobby (ACL) focusing on what are stated as freedoms neglected by the Australian Human Rights Commission, such as: 'freedom of speech, freedom of religion, freedom of conscience and freedom of association'. Seed funding was provided by the ACL.

== Campaigns and cases ==
The HRLA was active in the campaign against same sex marriage in Australia.

Jointly with the ACL, HRLA lodged a submission to the Australian Senate Select Committee on the 'Exposure Draft Of The Marriage Amendment (Same-Sex Marriage)' Bill.

== People ==
- John Steenhof, Managing Director
- Martyn Iles, resigned as Managing Director, February 2018 to become Managing Director of the Australian Christian Lobby (ACL)
- Christopher Brohier, Consulting Barrister
- David Burr, Chairman
- Jim Wallace, Board Member
