= Meghan Murphy =

Canadian feminist and journalist

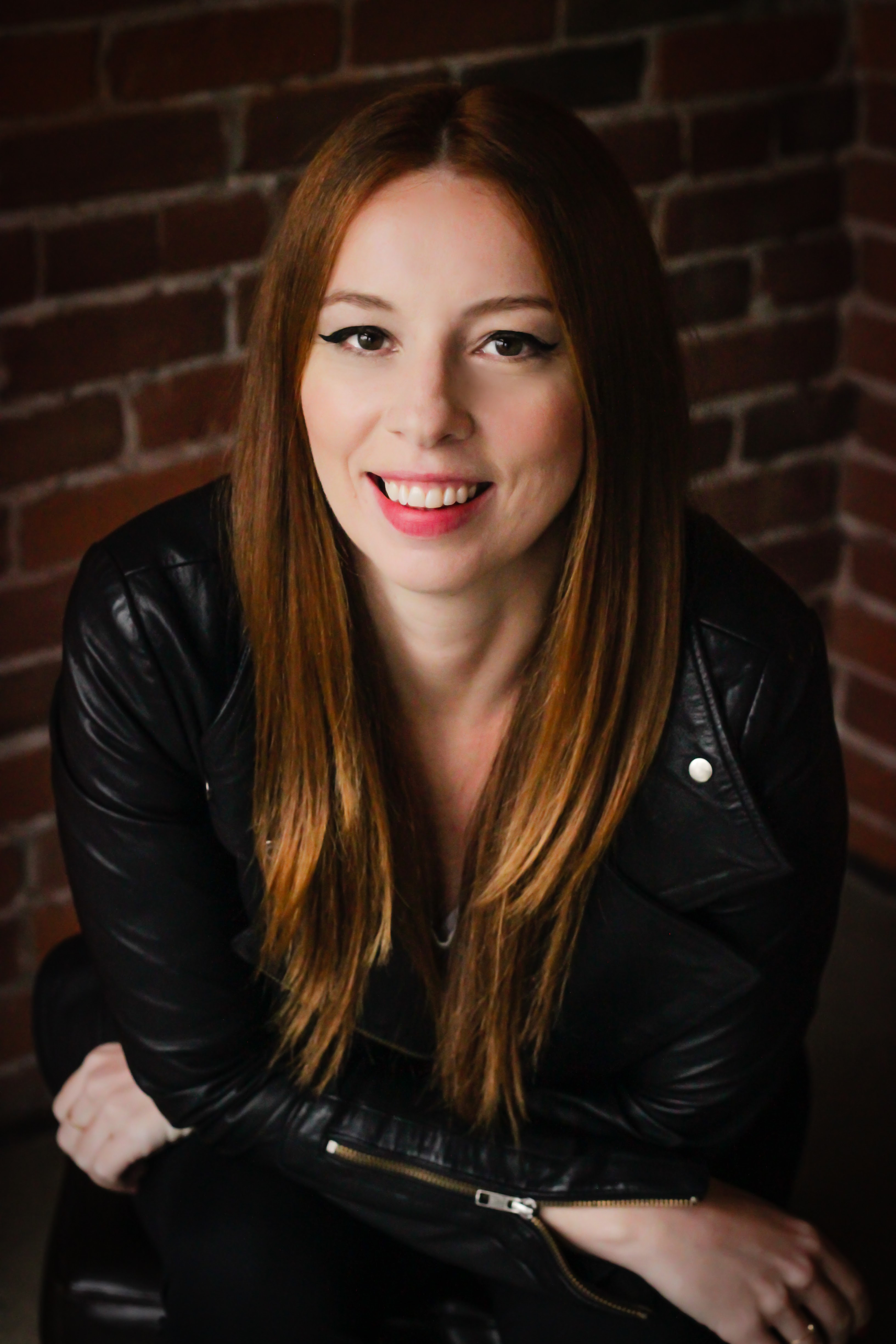
- Born: Meghan Emily Murphy
- Education: Simon Fraser University
- Occupations: Journalist, writer, podcast host, political candidate
- Known for: Feminist Current (founder, editor)
- Political party: People's Party of Canada
- Website: www.feministcurrent.com

Meghan Emily Murphy is a Canadian writer, journalist, politician, and founder of Feminist Current, a gender-critical feminist website and podcast. She has contributed opinion and feature pieces to Canadian and international media, and has spoken widely on topics related to feminism and women's rights.

Her writing, speeches, and talks have criticized "third-wave feminism", prostitution, the sex industry, exploitation of women in mass media, censorship, and gender identity legislation, positions that have drawn significant media attention and controversy. Formerly based in Vancouver, she moved from Canada to Mexico in 2021.

== Early life and education ==
Murphy grew up in Vancouver, British Columbia.

From 2004, she attended Simon Fraser University (SFU) and in 2010 obtained a BA in Women's Studies. In 2012, she completed a master's degree in Gender, Sexuality and Women's Studies, also at SFU. Her graduate work focused on feminist theory, media representation, and debates around prostitution and pornography, topics that later became central to her public writing and commentary.

== Career ==
=== Journalism ===
Murphy began her journalism career in 2009, working for the Vancouver-based F Word Feminist Media Collective; writing until 2012 for its blog, The F Word, and as a host, producer, and editor of its radio program. In 2011, she began writing regularly for rabble.ca, and worked as rabble's podcast network producer from November 2012, and evening editor from 2013, until February 2016. In 2012, she undertook a practicum at The Tyee.

=== Feminist Current ===
Feminist Current
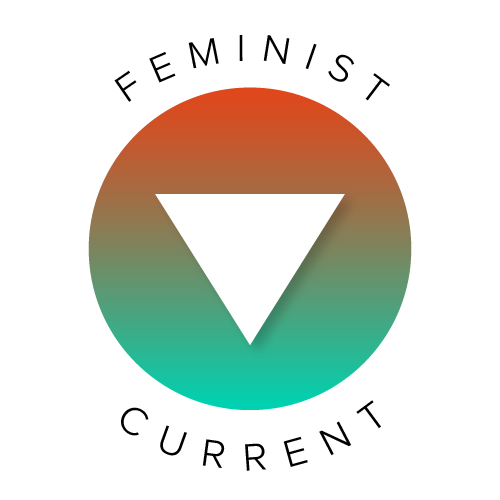
- Website type: News, commentary, interviews, reviews, podcast
- Available in: English
- Creator: Meghan Murphy
- Website: feministcurrent.com
- Launched: July 2012; 14 years ago
- Current status: Online

Murphy founded Feminist Current website and podcast in 2012.

Since 2012, she has had her own YouTube channel, The Same Drugs with Meghan Murphy: Conversations Outside the Algorithm, where she interviews guests about feminism. She streams the weekly video podcast on YouTube.

=== Views on trigger warnings, sexism, contemporary feminism, and prostitution ===
Murphy has argued that trigger warnings amount to censorship, written about ageism within feminism, criticized liberal feminism, supported the MeToo movement, and questioned whether men can be feminists. She has also argued that anti-bullying campaigns ignore sexism, and the way young men are taught to view women. She has lambasted feminist group Femen, who, she argued in 2013, was "making feminism palatable for the male gaze", presenting "a vision of female liberation that looks like a sexy, naked, thin, white, blonde woman". (Note: For an English translation of the Isabelle Alonso interview, see Sporenda (August 2, 2013). "Interview: Meghan Murphy on the sex industry, individualism, online feminism, and the third wave". Feminist Current.) In January 2017, Murphy argued, in the context of a Washington Post editorial praising men for taking part in the 2017 Women's March, against making concessions to men to make them feel comfortable within feminism. It is not women who need to adapt, she wrote:

Women are not targeted by men walking alone at night, in their homes, at work, in bars, or in any of the other myriad of places women are attacked, harassed, and raped, because they are passive, wear high heels, have long hair, wear dresses, or behave in other "feminine" ways, but because they are female. Female children are not prostituted or abused by adult men because they identify with "femininity", but because of the sex class they were born into. Girls are feminized, not "feminine" by choice or because of some kind of internal, unchangeable personality flaw that turns them into victims.

Murphy has criticized third-wave feminism as well, interpreting it as a backlash against second-wave and radical feminism. For example, she has criticized Slutwalk and the attempt to reclaim a word that has been used to shame women. She has been broadly critical of sex-positive feminism, observing in 2013: "That whole burlesque/sex work is empowering/feminist porn aspect of the third wave is making a mockery of the movement." More generally, she has said certain contemporary movements are "cult-like" in their efforts to shut down debates by calling people "phobic" (such as "whorephobic") or accusing them of "shaming" (as in "kink-shaming") if they fail to "toe the party line". In 2013, she called Twitter "a horrible place for feminism ... intellectual laziness is encouraged, oversimplification is mandatory, posturing is de rigueur, and bullying is rewarded".

Murphy is highly critical of the sex and porn industry, which she regards as "inherently misogynistic and exploitative". When Hugh Hefner died in 2017, Murphy called him a "billionaire who profited from women's subordination". That year, Murphy also wrote an article criticizing sex robots, titled "Sex Robots Epitomize Patriarchy and Offer Men A Solution to the Threat of Female Independence". MEL interviewed her about her views in 2017. She said that the use of sex robots "leads to violence against women". In an interview with CBC Radio's The Current in 2018, she argued that sex dolls may reduce men's empathy for women as she believes that they "literally turn women into objects". She told Mic in 2015 that this includes public education, a strong welfare state, retraining police officers, and offering exit services for women. She has also been criticized by some feminists for her opposition to decriminalizing the purchase of sex.

== Political views ==
Murphy identified as a socialist feminist in the past, but no longer identifies with feminism or socialism.

=== Opposition to transgender activism ===
==== rabble.ca ====
Murphy contributed as an editor and writer for Canadian online magazine rabble.ca beginning in 2011. In 2015, Murphy challenged a photograph of Laverne Cox's nude body in a magazine as being "defined by a patriarchal/porn culture, through plastic surgery", and "a sexualized object for public consumption". In response, a Change.org petition was created in May 2015 by sex workers' lobby group Maggie's Toronto, accusing her of racism and using transphobic language, and demanding that rabble end Murphy's association with the site. The petition was countered by a collective open letter in solidarity with Murphy, signed by 22 international feminist organizations and over 215 individuals. The Change.org petition was rejected by rabble. However, in October 2016 Murphy quit rabble.ca, after an article she wrote, critical of Planned Parenthood's use of the word "menstruators" had been published and then removed without informing her. Editor Michael Stewart felt that it had used transphobic language, and gone against rabble's journalistic policy. In an e-mail to Murphy, rabble's publisher, Kim Elliott, stated that "the piece denie[d] the gendered identity of trans men who menstruate by implying that if a person has ovaries and a uterus, they are, by virtue of those biological markers, a woman".

==== Opposition to gender identity legislation ====
Murphy is critical of gender identity legislation. In May 2017, Murphy appeared before the Canadian Senate, together with Hilla Kerner of the Vancouver Rape Relief & Women's Shelter, to oppose Bill C-16, which encoded gender identity and gender expression into Canadian law. She told the Senate: "Treating gender as though it is either internal or a personal choice is dangerous and completely misunderstands how and why women are oppressed under patriarchy as a class of people ... The rights of women and girls are being pushed aside to accommodate a trend."

In 2019, she was invited to speak before the Scottish Parliament regarding gender identity laws and their impact on women's rights. At their public meeting in London, she told Woman's Place UK, "I see no empathy for women and girls on the part of trans activists, that is to say, those pushing gender identity ideology and legislation. What I see is bullying, threats, ostracization, and a misogynist backlash against the feminist movement and much of the work it's accomplished over years." In an interview with The Scotsman regarding her views about transgender rights legislation, Murphy stated:

I'm not interested in stopping anyone having surgery or hormones if they feel that's making their lives better, and certainly people should be able to wear what they want and express themselves in ways that make them feel fulfilled and living authentic lives. But once it became about laws and legislation and gender replacing sex it became clear to me that this would have a real impact on women's rights and spaces.

Murphy has faced criticism due to her opposition to the establishment of transgender rights legislation, which has led to her being labelled as "anti-transgender" or a "TERF" (trans-exclusionary radical feminist) by her opponents.

==== Twitter ban and lawsuit ====
In late 2018, Twitter changed its policy on hateful conduct and harassment to officially prohibit intentionally calling a trans person by the wrong pronouns or using their pre-transition names. Beginning in August 2018, Murphy stated that her Twitter account was locked more than once after she tweeted about issues involving trans women. Twitter permanently suspended Murphy's account in late November 2018, after she referred to Jessica Yaniv, a trans woman, as "him". On February 11, 2019, Murphy filed a lawsuit against Twitter in response to her banning. The suit was dismissed in early June, but Murphy stated that she intended to file an appeal.

Murphy's account was restored on November 20, 2022.

==== Residential school unmarked graves ====
In July 2021, Murphy criticized Canadian leftists after churches were burned down in Canada due to allegations of unmarked graves of Indigenous children on the sites of church-run residential schools. Murphy stated that the graves were "to be fair, a horrifying stain on Canada's history..." but accused Canadian leftists of "advocating" for the destruction of Canadian buildings, describing it as "an entirely inappropriate thing for a person representing an organisation supposedly committed to protecting freedom of religion and assembly to do...", negatively comparing them to Black Lives Matter protests in Portland and Seattle, which she described as riots.

In September 2023, Murphy denied the existence of a reported 215 unmarked graves of Indigenous children at Kamloops Indian Residential School, pointing out that no excavations of sites allegedly containing unmarked graves had turned up human remains. As of February 2025, no human remains have been excavated or confirmed.

==== American and Canadian politics ====
In the run-up to the 2024 United States presidential election, Murphy said that she supported Hillary Clinton for U.S. President in 2016, but was now backing Donald Trump. She also backed Conservative leader Pierre Poilievre to become Canadian prime minister.

In the 2025 Canadian federal election, she was the candidate for the People's Party of Canada to be the member of parliament for Vancouver East. She received 329 votes, matching Kimball Cariou of the Communist Party of Canada. Both candidates finished in the final two positions, each securing 0.6% of the vote, while Jenny Kwan of the New Democratic Party was re-elected.

== Public appearances and protests ==
Murphy's public appearances have been subject to protests in Canada, notably in Vancouver and Toronto. In both cities, LGBTQ organizations have also criticized public libraries for allowing Murphy to book space for public appearances. Mayor of Toronto John Tory announced that he was "disappointed" in the library's decision to host Murphy's event, and said that the "highest of standards" should be set to ensure that "offensive commentary" is not hosted in city facilities. The OLA opposition's Critic for Culture and Women's Issues Jill Andrew also objected to the event.

Tory asked City Librarian Vickery Bowles to reconsider the decision to permit Murphy's appearance. In response to the statements by the mayor, Murphy said, "It is unconscionable that the mayor of Toronto would attempt to pressure the [Toronto Public Library] to cancel this event...What I am saying is not controversial, and certainly is not hateful ... We deserve space for this conversation and our concerns deserve respect." Bowles defended the approval to host the event, noting that "Murphy has never been charged with or convicted of hate speech."

== See also ==
- Postfeminism
