= Blaire White =

American YouTuber and political commentator (born 1993)

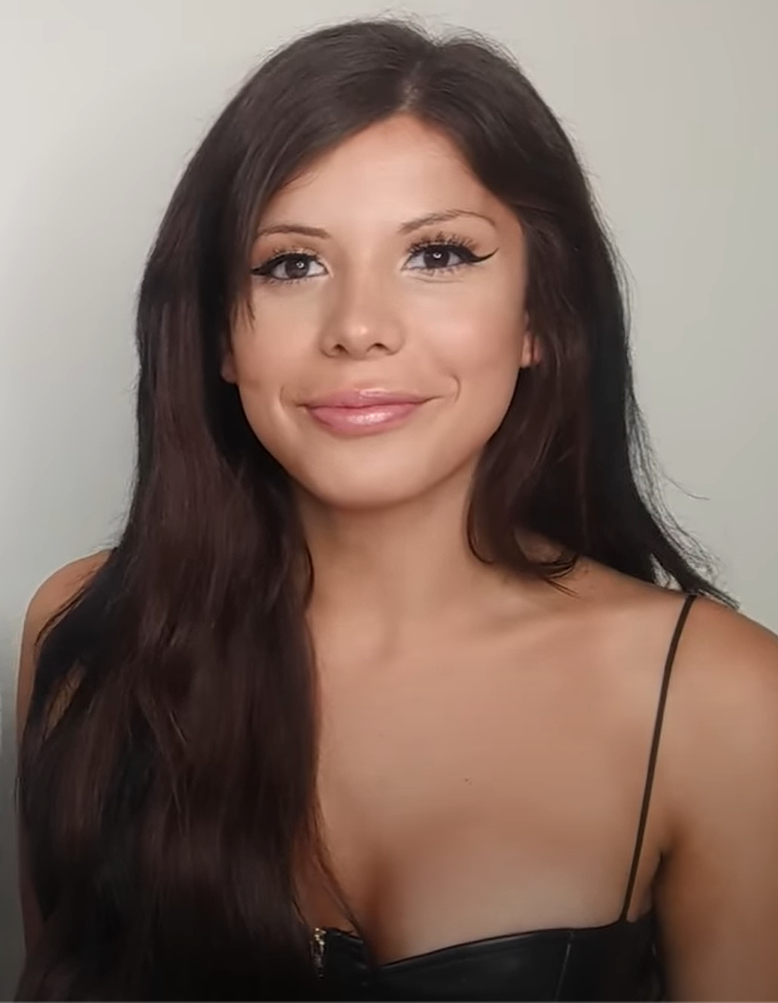
- White in 2019
- Born: September 14, 1993 (age 33); Corning, California, U.S.
- Education: California State University, Chico (dropped out)
- Occupations: YouTuber; political commentator

YouTube information
- Channels: Blaire White; The Blaire White Project
- Years active: 2015–present
- Genres: Politics; vlog
- Subscribers: 1.54 million (Blaire White); 687,000 (The Blaire White Project)
- Views: 443.4 million (Blaire White); 164.6 million (The Blaire White Project)
- Last updated: April 8, 2026

Blaire Russell White (born September 14, 1993) is an American YouTuber and conservative political commentator. Her videos center around social issues such as transgender issues and feminism.

== Early life ==
White described experiencing gender dysphoria from a young age, saying, "my earliest memories were those of gender dysphoria: feeling uncomfortable in my skin and incapable of meeting male ideals." At 20 years old, she came out as transgender to her family and friends and began feminizing hormone therapy in 2015.

While studying computer science at California State University, Chico, White appeared on a friend's Youtube live stream, and commenters encouraged her to start her own account. Prior to starting on YouTube, she was a self-described "social justice warrior" and held liberal political views but stated her beliefs changed after starting college.

== YouTube career ==
While studying at college in December 2015, White began posting anti-feminist political videos to YouTube. White later dropped out of college to continue making videos discussing gender politics as well as lifestyle vlogs that documented her own gender transition.

Her YouTube channel has been the setting for many of her public debates with public figures such as Ben Shapiro, ContraPoints, and Onision. She became the first openly transgender woman to be featured in Penthouse in 2018.

In February 2017, White was banned from social networking platform Facebook for 30 days, drawing complaints from her supporters. Her account was reinstated shortly afterwards, and Facebook said the ban was an error. That same year, White began uploading videos about her personal life, including about her gender-affirming surgeries.

On November 11, 2017, White and her boyfriend filmed a video in which they wore hats bearing the Trump slogan "Make America Great Again" and attended an anti-Trump protest on Hollywood Boulevard. In the video, she claims to have been assaulted twice, had her nail ripped off, and had a drink thrown in her face. Police said that White and her boyfriend began the altercation when they crossed a divider between pro- and anti-Trump protesters.

In 2018, she told Penthouse that she had had to contact the Federal Bureau of Investigation as a result of backlash.

In August 2019, White hosted a debate with transgender activist Jessica Yaniv centered around Yaniv's human rights complaint regarding a genital waxing incident. During the debate, Yaniv brandished a taser on camera, resulting in her arrest in Canada.

In October 2020, White apologized and deleted a video she posted about transgender athlete Janae Marie Kroc. White claimed that Kroc competed against cisgender women in powerlifting events and unfairly won events as a result, and also mocked Kroc's appearance, calling her "outlandish." Afterwards, Kroc responded on Instagram saying that "everything she said about me was incorrect." Kroc clarified that she had only ever competed before she transitioned, in the men's division, and that she had never competed and did not intend to compete against other women. On October 15, White apologized on Twitter, admitting she did not do "enough research" and took "rumors about her at face value" and deleted the video from her YouTube channel.

In 2021, White said of the super straight trend that "The fact that people are upset about this new sexuality being created is a little hypocritical coming from the folks who created abrosexual, demisexual, gerontosexual, gynosexual, intrasexual, kalosexual, multisexual, pomosexual, sapiosexual, and literally hundreds more" and that "Even though super-straight is a joke, the irony is that it's a lot more valid than a lot of those I just listed. Actually, all of them."

In 2021, White was featured in right-wing rapper Tom MacDonald's music video "Snowflakes," which has garnered over 25 million views on YouTube.

In 2023, White was featured on The Roseanne Barr Podcast.

Her discourses on transgender issues are often regarded as transmedicalist, and she has made videos with Kalvin Garrah reacting to what they called "transtrenders."

== Political views ==
White has described herself as part of the conservative movement. In 2017, White described her political beliefs as center-right. She supported Donald Trump in the 2016 United States presidential election but stated in 2018 that she remains critical of some of his policies and actions in office. For instance, White said that she was partly against Trump's transgender military ban. In a 2019 Vice debate, she identified as Republican.

Blaire White endorsed Donald Trump's presidential candidacy on July 14, 2024 on X.

== Personal life ==
White is engaged to fellow YouTuber Joey Sarson. Her mother's side of the family supports her and her transition. White has expressed the desire to have children in the future through surrogacy or adoption, and has discussed her struggle with infertility due to the effects of hormones.

In 2019, White said that she is non-religious, stating that religion has had little significance in her life. However, in a 2025 YouTube video, White described herself as a Christian.

In a 2023 interview with journalist Matt Cullen, White described her troubled relationship with her father, who died of cancer when White was 19, before she transitioned.

White is a California native and a former resident of Los Angeles. In 2020, White made a video about the cons of living in Los Angeles and announced that she and her fiancé were moving to Austin, Texas. They moved in 2021. In July 2025, she announced she was moving back to California.
