= United Christian Party (Australia) =

Defunct political party in Australia

The United Christian Party was a minor Australian political party active between 1972 and 1974, and again in 1980. Following 1980 it was renamed the Australian Christian Party and contested the 1983 election as such.

Originally formed in South Australia, its platform listed the election of a non-party-bound Christian to the Senate, the development of the Aboriginal race with the rest of the community, monarchism and the preservation of the Australian flag's current form as its aims. It contested the Senate in 1974 and the House of Representatives (in Victorian seats) in 1980 and 1983.

== See also ==
- Christian politics in Australia
