= Jim Wallace (Australian activist) =

Australian army officer

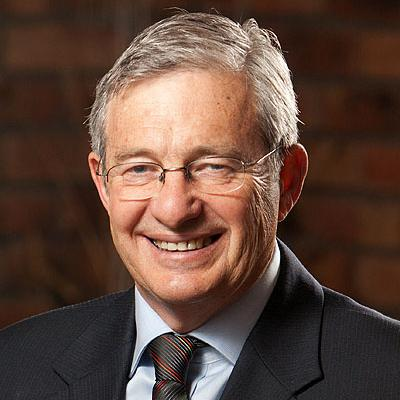
- Military career
- Allegiance: Australia
- Branch: Australian Army
- Service years: 1968–2000
- Rank: Brigadier
- Commands: Special Air Service Regiment
- Conflicts: United Nations Truce Supervision Organization
- Awards: Member of the Order of Australia
- Other work: Christian lobbyist

James John Arundel Wallace, AM is a retired Australian Army officer and a current lobbyist on social issues. Wallace was the managing director of the Australian Christian Lobby from 2000 to 2013. He is now the Chairman of that organisation.

== Early life and military career ==
Wallace studied at the Royal Military College, Duntroon and the British Army Staff College. He served in the Australian Army for 32 years, reaching the rank of brigadier. His service included command of the Special Air Service Regiment (1988–1990). He was made a Member of the Order of Australia in 1984.

== Activism and criticism ==
Wallace has publicly expressed opposition to women in combat and changing the Marriage Act of Australia. Several of his public comments, particularly those about homosexuality, have attracted criticism.

Wallace has raised concerns about violent video games. The Sydney Morning Herald reported that Wallace "suggested a homosexual lifestyle was more hazardous to health than smoking." In response Prime Minister Julia Gillard called Wallace's comments "heartless", "wrong" and "totally unacceptable", and cancelled a speech she had planned to give to the ACL's national conference. On 4 May 2012, Wallace appeared before the Australian Senate, Legal and Constitutional Affairs Legislation Committee during their consideration of the Marriage Equality Amendment Bill 2010 where he presented to the Committee his arguments, "in support of the definition of marriage".

Following a return visit to Syria in 2013 to assess the situation for the minorities in the Syrian conflict, Wallace claimed the vulnerable Christians there will face even worse persecution than that experienced by Egypt's Coptic Christians. Saying that the West's policy for the Middle East "courts a disaster", he urged the West to take decisive action to protect Syria's Christians.

Wallace also commentates on defence and security issues, having lived in the Middle East where he served with the United Nations in Lebanon and Syria. In 2003 he was appointed the Council of the Australian Strategic Policy Institute by the Minister for Defence. As of 2017 he was no longer on ASPI's Council.

Party political offices
Preceded by John Gagliardi	Director of Australian Christian Lobby; 2000–2013	Succeeded by Lyle Shelton
