= Australian Family Association =

- Founded: 1980
- Region served: Australia
- Website: https://family.org.au/

The Australian Family Association (AFA) is a conservative Christian political organisation. It was founded in 1980 by the National Civic Council's then president, B. A. Santamaria.

== Beliefs and lobbying ==
The AFA states they were formed to "provide a forum and vehicle for individuals and organisations in the community concerned with the strengthening and support of the family." They defines marriage as "between one man and one woman, for life". The AFA lobbies against issues including same-sex marriage, transgender rights, abortion and euthanasia, and promotes family taxation reforms for single-income families.

In 2001, the AFA was among groups who unsuccessfully called for controversial rapper Eminem to be banned from entering Australia, labelling him a "hate rapper".

== Controversy and criticism ==
Ross Fitzgerald criticised the AFA in 2008 for protesting against a film they had not viewed, and also criticised the Australian Classification Review Board for letting the protest influence them.

At an anti same-sex marriage rally the AFA co-organised in 2011, guest speakers stated same-sex marriage should be "laughed at and ridiculed", and claimed that same-sex marriage would allow paedophiles to marry children and would affect the ability of women to marry men. Mental health psychologist Paul Martin said such comments would be psychologically damaging to young gay people, stating "the last thing they need to hear are these kinds of offensive comments from people who purport to represent 'family values'."

== See also ==
- American Family Association
- Australian Christian Lobby
- FamilyVoice Australia
