= Lyle Shelton (lobbyist) =

Australian political lobbyist

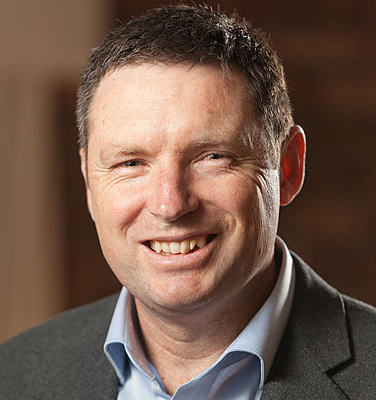

National Director of the Family First Party
- Incumbent
- Assumed office 27 May 2022

Councillor of the City of Toowoomba
- In office 2000–2006

Personal details
- Born: Lyle Shelton South Burnett, Queensland, Australia
- Party: Family First (2022–present)
- Other political affiliations: Nationals (2006); Conservatives (2018–2019); Liberal National (2019); Christian Democratic (2021–2022)
- Occupation: Lobbyist; managing director Family First

Lyle Shelton is an Australian political lobbyist who has served as the national director of the Family First Party since May 2022. Shelton previously served as managing director of the Australian Christian Lobby (ACL) from 2013 to 2018, and was one of the leaders of the "No" campaign in the Australian Marriage Law Postal Survey. In 2018, he resigned from the ACL to become the federal communications director of the Australian Conservatives.

== Early life ==
Lyle Shelton was born in South Burnett, Queensland.

== Career ==
Shelton was at one time the youth pastor on the staff of Toowoomba City Church. He served on Toowoomba City Council from 2000 to 2006. Shelton was the chair of Council's Strategy and Governance Committee and campaigned against the sex trade in that area. He had an active role in the "No" campaign in the 2006 Toowoomba Water Futures referendum, which his side won.

Shelton retired from the Council to contest the 2006 state election, running in the seat of Toowoomba North for the Queensland Nationals. He was unsuccessful.

=== Australian Christian Lobby (2013–2018) ===
Shelton was managing director of the Australian Christian Lobby from 2013 to 2018, having previously been chief of staff.

He has said that same-sex marriage would affect the needs of children and religious views.

Shelton is a member of the Australian Churches Gambling Taskforce. In relation to poker machines, he has said they cause incredible hardship to Australian children and families.

He campaigned against the Safe schools program.

In December 2016, Shelton participated in The Cape Town Declaration launched by conservative groups in Cape Town, South Africa, to affirm marriage as between a man and a woman.

In the Australian Marriage Law Postal Survey, as of mid-September 2017, Shelton was mentioned across news outlets more times than the leading three "Yes" campaigners, Alex Greenwich, Tiernan Brady and Sally Rugg, combined.

=== Australian Conservatives (2018–2019) ===
In February 2018, Shelton resigned from his ACL position to re-enter party politics, joining Cory Bernardi's Australian Conservatives as federal communications director. He ran as the lead Senate candidate for Queensland at the 2019 Australian federal election, at which the party obtained just 1% of the vote. The party was deregistered on 25 June 2019.

=== Christian Democratic Party (2021) ===
In March 2021, during a Supreme Court case between two factions of the board, Fred Nile announced that he would be stepping down at the end of 2021 and nominated Shelton as his successor in the New South Wales Legislative Council and as President of the NSW Christian Democratic Party. Shelton agreed to this. The Australian Financial Review stated that his priorities were expected to be "abortion, energy security, poverty and 'woke corporations'".

Shelton moved to Sydney and took up a position within the Christian Democratic Party. In September 2021 Nile withdrew his endorsement of Shelton due to "irreconcilable differences" arising from opinions Shelton had posted online and a concern that "Lyle often acted without consultation with my team". Nile stated that he would remain in parliament until 2023 to complete his parliamentary term. Shelton was reported to be "devastated", but pledged "my ongoing service to party members and supporters as we build a political movement that truly reflects Christ's character".

=== Family First Party (2022–present) ===
On 27 May 2022, Shelton was appointed national director of the Family First Party. Tom Kenyon, a former Labor state minister and the current National Chairman of Family First, said he was 'delighted' to have 'someone of Lyle's calibre' joining the party.

"Australians need a party that will take a bold and unequivocable stand for families. The welfare and protection of families our freedom and our faiths should lie at the heart of our society and community. These are the foundations upon which western civilisation has been built and they must continue to remain strong. That's why we are building a movement that will stand for families and it is why I am delighted to have someone of Lyle's calibre to help build on the momentum Family First achieved at the recent South Australian election"

Shelton stood in the 2023 New South Wales state election for the Legislative Council. His group got 1.2% with 58,361 votes.

Shelton stood as the lead Senate candidate for Family First in New South Wales at the 2025 Australian federal election. He got 1.62% with 80,560 votes.

Shelton is standing in the 2027 New South Wales state election for the Legislative Council.

== Other activities ==
Shelton was employed by Oodgeroo MP Mark Robinson from at least August 2019 and as of October 2020.

From 2022, Shelton presented a program on ADH TV.

== Award ==
In December 2016, Shelton was awarded World Magazine's "2016 Daniel of the Year" for his role in the same-sex marriage debate in Australia.

== Views ==
Shelton has drawn controversy for repeatedly referring to children brought up by same-sex couples as a Stolen Generation, for his disappointment in Christians who support same-sex marriage, and for his support for parents who wished to use conversion therapy on LGBT minors.

Shelton has claimed a drag queen show is "pornography".

Shelton supported Ron DeSantis during the 2024 Republican Party presidential primaries.

== Works ==
- I Kid You Not: Notes from 20 Years in the Trenches of the Culture Wars

Preceded by Jim Wallace	Managing Director of Australian Christian Lobby; 2013–2018	Succeeded by Martyn Iles
