= Binary Australia =

Australian lobby group

Marriage Alliance
- Successor: Binary Australia
- Formation: 2 July 2015; 11 years ago
- Dissolved: 18 November 2018; 7 years ago
- Registration no.: ABN 81 606 852 199
- Purpose: Heterosexism; Homophobia
- Board of directors: Ashley Goldsworthy board member
- Key people: CEO Damian Wyld
- Website: marriagealliance.com.au

Binary Australia formerly the Marriage Alliance, is an Australian anti-trans and anti-gay marriage lobby group based in Sydney, New South Wales. According to the group's website, it "is an independent alliance bringing together individuals and organisations supporting a common cause. We exist to voice the opinion of the silent majority of Australians that respect same-sex attracted people, but do not want to change the current definition of marriage." They campaign against same-sex marriage.

In November 2018 the group rebranded as Binary Australia with the stated aim to "carry on the fight for traditional values that celebrate the inherent differences between boys and girls, men and women". The Global Project Against Hate and Extremism (GPAHE) released a report on 5 October 2022, in which it classified Binary Australia as an "anti-LGBTQ+" group.

== Campaigns ==
Marriage Alliance partnered with the Coalition for Marriage and other groups opposed to same-sex marriage, to campaign for a 'No' vote in the 2017 Australian Marriage Law Postal Survey.

They have conducted an extensive and controversial anti-gay marriage campaign in the media and on social media:

- Ads initially accepted for broadcast by Channels 7 and 10, with management of those channels later deciding to not do so, were subsequently, and controversially, broadcast by Foxtel.
- a 'rainbow noose' advert "claiming that same-sex marriage will increase suicide because people who are against it will be bullied over their views if it becomes law".
- a YouTube presentation 'It's not as simple as you think'.
- anti-Safe Schools pamphlets.

== Other activities ==
They have also

- published articles attacking proponents of gay marriage, such as Totalitarianism and the Hypocrisy of the Homosexual Agenda.
- created an iOS and Android app to disseminate their material.

== Controversies ==
In 2025, Binary Australia and Kirralie Smith, a Binary Australia spokeswoman, were found guilty of vilifying Stephanie Blanch, a trans football player, with Smith also being found guilty of vilifying a second trans football player, as well as having an apprehended violence order granted against her from Blanch after X posts that the court found "highly intimidatory".

== Associated bodies ==
Australia

- Anglican Diocese of Sydney
- Australian Catholic Bishops' Conference
- Australian Christian Churches
- Australian Christian Lobby
- FamilyVoice Australia

US

- National Organization for Marriage

== People ==
- Ashley Goldsworthy, board member
- Damian Wyld, CEO
- Sophie York, spokesperson
- Kirralie Smith, spokeswoman

== See also ==
- World Congress of Families
