= Australian Conservatives =

Political party in Australia

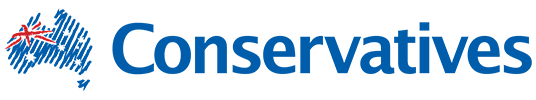
- Leader: Cory Bernardi
- Founder: Cory Bernardi
- Founded: 7 February 2017; 9 years ago (Note: The foundational date of the party was in February 2017. However, the party was originally established as a conservative organisation in July 2016.)
- Split from: Liberal Party
- Headquarters: King William Street, Kent Town, South Australia 5067
- Membership (2017): ▲22,000 (Note: It was reported that the party had approximately 13,000 members in July 2017. In 2019, with Bernardi formally establishing the dissolution of the party, he stated that the party's membership reached 22,000 in its first year (2017).)
- Ideology: Conservatism (Australian); Social conservatism; Economic liberalism
- Political position: Right-wing
- Colours: Light blue
- Slogan: ...a better way

Website
- Party website (archived)

Australian Conservatives was a conservative political party in Australia formed in 2017. It was led by Cory Bernardi, who had been elected to the Senate for the Liberal Party, but resigned citing disagreements with the Liberal–National Coalition, its policies and leadership under Malcolm Turnbull.

The Family First Party and its two state parliamentarians, Dennis Hood and Robert Brokenshire, joined the Australian Conservatives. Brokenshire was not re-elected at the 2018 state election, and Hood left the Conservatives to join the Liberal Party, leaving Bernardi as the sole remaining member in federal parliament, whose term in the senate ran until 30 June 2022. In 2017, the leaders of the Victorian branch of the Australian Christians agreed to merge the Victorian branch with the Conservatives.

Bernardi deregistered the party following the re-election of the Coalition Morrison government at the 2019 Australian federal election, citing a lack of political success and poor financial position. He later joined One Nation ahead of the 2026 South Australian state election. Which he won a seat.

== History ==
=== Activist group ===
The Australian Conservatives were established by Senator Bernardi as a conservative political activist group on 6 July 2016. The group was announced by Bernardi on his personal blog as a conservative "movement" to "help change politics and to give common sense a united voice". Bernardi cited the results of the 2016 federal election as a motivator for the group's establishment, stating that "over 1.7m votes were cast for right-of-centre or conservative parties rather than the Liberals", and that "the clear mission now is to bring people together for the good of the country." Despite contemporary media speculation when he created the group, following numerous public expressions of disappointment towards the Liberals, its policies, and leader Malcolm Turnbull, he stated that its establishment did not signal any breakaway from the Liberals, of which he was a senator, and that its intent was to "make the Liberals stronger". Within a month, the group's online newsletter reached over 50,000 subscribers.

Queensland Liberal National Party MP George Christensen was one of the first Coalition members of Parliament to support Bernardi and the Australian Conservatives, following his shared dissatisfaction with the election results. Despite this, Bernardi hinted otherwise in the months following, often going against Coalition policy and criticising the government, in particular over the Racial Discrimination Act debate, especially 18C. In late December 2016, Bernardi held controversial meetings with members of the United States presidential campaign of Donald Trump, allegedly in preparation for forming a breakaway party after continued dissatisfaction with the party and its policies, While he refrained from commenting on renewed speculation that he would split, he was met with negative reception from fellow party colleagues, including former Prime Minister and Liberal leader Tony Abbott.

=== Party foundation ===
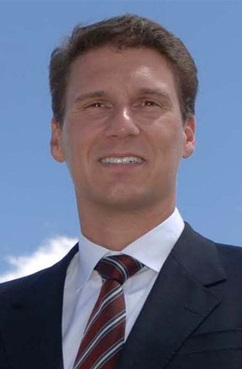
Australian Conservatives founder and leader Cory Bernardi

On 7 February 2017, Bernardi announced his resignation from the Liberals through a speech in the Senate, opting to advance the Australian Conservatives as a political party, and sit on the Senate crossbench as its leader. In his speech, Bernardi claimed that "the level of public disenchantment with the major parties, the lack of confidence in our political process and the concern about the direction of our nation is very, very strong", and rationalised the creation of the Conservatives as a political party with the "need to find a better way". Bernardi also cited the resurgence and rise of conservative parties such as Pauline Hanson's One Nation as proof of such. Although dissatisfaction with the leadership of the Coalition was still shared by many in Parliament, numerous members have since denied any intention to join the Australian Conservatives, with most of them strongly criticising Bernardi—some described his move as a "betrayal". Tony Pasin, in particular, described Bernardi's move as unsurprising, "given the way that conservatives from South Australia are treated by the leadership of the Liberals".

On 7 April 2017, Kirralie Smith—a former candidate for the Australian Liberty Alliance and a member of the Q Society of Australia and Senate candidate for New South Wales in 2016—joined the party. The Australian Liberty Alliance discussed the prospect of merging with the Australian Conservatives, but ultimately declined the offer. Australian Conservatives was registered as a political party with the Australian Electoral Commission on 12 April 2017. Later that month, the party formed a Senate voting bloc with the Liberal Democratic Party Senator David Leyonhjelm. The party issued a policy release in April 2017 urging party members to petition major chocolate companies to oppose Easter Eggs being renamed Holiday Eggs. The release caused confusion on the grounds that there was no evidence any major chocolate company had ever done that in Australia, or that anyone had ever asked them to.

In May 2017, Bernardi met the national and Victorian state leadership of the Australian Christians to discuss a merger between the two parties. On 26 June 2017 it was revealed that Victorian MLC Rachel Carling-Jenkins was leaving the Democratic Labour Party to join the Australian Conservatives. The Democratic Labour Party declined an offer to merge with the Australian Conservatives. On 11 August 2017, former federal Liberal MP Dennis Jensen announced that he was defecting to the Australian Conservatives, and urged Liberal Party members in Western Australia to join him. In September 2017, the Victoria state leadership of the Australian Christians merged between the two parties.

In February 2018, Lyle Shelton resigned from his lobbying position at Australian Christian Lobby to enter party politics, joining the Australian Conservatives as federal communications director. Later that month, former One Nation Senator Fraser Anning joined the party's voting bloc in the Senate, but remained an independent Senator.

=== Merger with Family First ===
On 25 April 2017, it was announced that the Family First Party would merge with the Australian Conservatives, with its two members of the South Australian Legislative Council joining the party. Newly-appointed Family First senator Lucy Gichuhi did not join the Conservatives.

Family First was generally considered to be part of the Christian right. Though it had no formal affiliation with any particular religious organisation, Family First was strongly linked to the Pentecostal church in South Australia, and nationally with smaller Christian denominations. Family First in South Australia was viewed as an infusion of ex-Liberals via Robert Brokenshire and Bob Day. The party advocated a moral and family values agenda, but Day, who would become Family First's major donor, later reoriented Family First to emphasise issues such as industrial relations reform, free speech and smaller government, which brought Family First closer to Bernardi's Conservatives.

=== Electoral performance ===
The party made modest showings at the 2017 Bennelong and 2018 Batman by-elections, achieving primary vote of 4.29% and 6.41%, respectively, the latter in the absence of Liberal Party candidate, failing to elect a candidate in either instance.

In the 2019 New South Wales state election, the Australian Conservatives won approximately 0.6% of the vote.

In the subsequent federal election, the Australian Conservatives ran candidates for the senate in every state but failed to win any seats. In light of this result, Bernardi announced he would start the process of deregistering the party. Bernardi said that in addition to the party's poor showing at the polls, he believed that the Coalition's upset victory under new Prime Minister Scott Morrison proved that "common sense" had returned to Canberra, which was "all we, as Australian Conservatives, have ever sought to do."

== South Australian branch ==
Australian Conservatives (SA)
- Leader: Dennis Hood
- Registered: 4 July 2017
- Dissolved: 27 June 2019
- Ideology: Conservatism
- Political position: Right-wing

As a result of the merger of Family First with the Conservatives in April 2017, the Australian Conservatives had two representatives in the South Australian Legislative Council — Robert Brokenshire and Dennis Hood. At the time of their merger, Liberal immigration minister Peter Dutton suggested the party would mainly contend in South Australia, and Katharine Murphy, political editor for The Guardian, wrote in August 2017 that the coming South Australian state election would be a "key test" for the Australian Conservatives.

The party was registered with the Electoral Commission of South Australia on 4 July 2017, as Australian Conservatives (SA). The Conservatives announced on 16 February 2018 that they would stand 33 candidates in the House of Assembly for the 2018 South Australian state election, with Brokenshire seeking re-election in the Legislative Council. Hood was the leader of the state party going into the election. At the party's campaign launch on 25 February, Bernardi advocated for the introduction of nuclear energy in South Australia, and compared Elon Musk, who had recently announced a scheme for solar panels and batteries alongside Labor premier Jay Weatherill, to "the monorail salesman from The Simpsons". The party's slogan for the state election was "Make South Australia great again", drawn from the successful 2016 U.S. presidential campaign of Donald Trump. Max Opray of The Guardian suggested that the party would be able to contend with voters on the right of the Liberal Party, given both the moderate leanings of Liberal leader Steven Marshall and One Nation's failure to contest the state election.

The Conservatives' results for the 2018 state election in the House of Assembly.

On initial state election results, the Australian Conservatives won no seats in the lower house, and looked to have lost an upper house seat, with Brokenshire likely to be defeated. Bernardi stated that the party had received "a disappointing upper house vote", but that Australian Conservatives preferences prevented candidates from Nick Xenophon's SA Best party from winning seats in the House of Assembly. Final upper house results confirmed that Brokenshire had lost his seat, with the party polling 3.46 per cent. According to analysis by ABC News election analyst Antony Green, the Australian Conservatives received 3.03 per cent of the vote in the lower house. The strongest electorate for the Conservatives was Narungga, where the party received 9.1 per cent of first preference votes, and they received above 6 per cent in a further four electorates: MacKillop, Light, Chaffey, and Flinders. With the exception of Light, all were Liberal-held seats.

On 26 March, following the state election, Marshall, the newly-elected premier, announced that Hood would join the Liberal Party. Hood, the party's outgoing leader, described the Australian Conservatives as being focused on federal issues, and said the low vote of the party would result in it having "no impact". Brokenshire stated the following day that he had first raised the possibility of joining the Liberals to Hood. Bernardi told Sky News that he felt as if he had been "white-anted from within", and suggested that Hood may have planned his defection prior to the state election.

The South Australian branch of the Australian Conservatives was voluntarily deregistered on 27 June 2019, after Bernardi announced the nationwide winding-up of the party. Bernardi would go on to be elected as a One Nation member of the Legislative Council at the 2026 state election.

== Elected representatives ==
=== Federal ===
- Cory Bernardi − federal leader, Australian Senate (2017–2019; former member of the Liberal Party).

=== State ===
- Robert Brokenshire − Legislative Council of South Australia (2017–2018; former member of the Family First Party), lost his seat at the 2018 state election.
- Dennis Hood − South Australian leader, Legislative Council of South Australia (2017–2018; former member of the Family First Party); defected to the Liberal Party on 22 March 2018
- Rachel Carling-Jenkins − Legislative Council of Victoria (2017–2018; former member of the Democratic Labour Party), left the party in August 2018.

=== Local ===
- Trevor Scott − Berri Barmera Council

== Policies ==
The Australian Conservatives' policies included:

=== Oppose ===
- Safe schools program as political indoctrination within schools
- Subsidies for renewable energy
- Any renewable energy targets
- Paris Climate Agreement
- Revenue-raising measures forced upon police that are not genuinely about improving community safety
- Property rights being curtailed or usurped
- Moves to change Australia Day
- Same-sex marriage and LGBT sex education
- Abortion

=== Support ===
- A reduction in immigration levels and a strengthening of citizenship laws
- The retention of Australia Day on 26 January
- Industrial relations reform
- Control of all government spending and getting the budget back into surplus
- A national child sex offenders register available to the public
- A pay freeze for politicians and senior public servants
- The merger of ABC and SBS into a single, consolidated broadcaster
- A public database of campaign and political spending
- The use of nuclear power
- A Royal Commission into Chinese Communist Party influence in Australia
- An "ethic of reciprocity" in Australia's foreign investment and free trade agreements
- The uncluttering of school curricula and a focus on educational basics

== See also ==
- List of political parties in Australia
- Conservatism in Australia
