= Australian Christian Lobby =

Conservative Christian advocacy organisation

- Abbreviation: ACL
- Formation: 1995; 31 years ago
- Type: Non-governmental organisation; Advocacy group
- Headquarters: Canberra, Australian Capital Territory
- Chairman: Jim Wallace
- CEO: Michelle Pearse
- Website: www.acl.org.au

The Australian Christian Lobby (ACL) is a Christian-conservative advocacy organisation based in Canberra.

== Structure ==
The ACL is registered as a public company limited by guarantee and files political expenditure returns with the Australian Electoral Commission (AEC). Funding comes mostly from individuals but names are not disclosed by the organisation. It has no party-political affiliation and states it supports Christian values regarding faith.

Eternity House, the Deakin, Australian Capital Territory, headquarters of ACL, is registered as a separate not-for-profit entity.

== Staff ==
| Years | Name | Period | Time in office |
|---|---|---|---|
| 1995 | John Gagliardi | 1995–2000 | 5 years |
| 2000 | Jim Wallace | 2000–2013 | 13 years |
| 2013 | Lyle Shelton | 2013–2018 | 5 years |
| 2018 | Martyn Iles | From 3 Feb 2018 to 24 Feb 2023 | 5 years |
| 2023 | Wendy Francis | 2023 | |
| 2023 | Michelle Pearse | May 2023– | |

Jim Wallace was the managing director of ACL from 2000 to 2013.

Lyle Shelton was managing director from 2013 to 2018.

Martyn Iles was appointed managing director in 2018. 3 The company has a self-appointed board of management – board members are invited to join by existing board members. Board members are not elected by members.

ACL is represented in each state with state directors operating out of each capital city. The Queensland state director is Wendy Francis and the Western Australian state director is Peter Abetz.

In 2018, Shelton resigned from his ACL position to re-enter party politics, joining Cory Bernardi's Australian Conservatives as federal communications director. Shelton would later become the leader of Family First Party in 2022.

In 2023, the Board terminated the contract of CEO Martyn Iles.

== Lobbying strategies ==
ACL activities include:

- National, pre-election "Make it Count" events and other conferences/forums where Australian political leaders address individuals and groups sharing common views with the ACL
  - 2007 John Howard and Kevin Rudd
  - 2008 Malcolm Turnbull
  - 2010 Tony Abbott, Kevin Rudd and Julia Gillard
  - 2014 Bill Shorten
  - 2016 Scott Morrison
  - 2017 Cory Bernardi and Matt Canavan
- State-based, "Make it Count" events have been held in NSW, Victoria, Queensland, Western Australia, Tasmania, Northern Territory and the Australian Capital Territory. These events are often webcast to a wider audience. For both federal and state elections, the ACL holds "Meet Your Candidate" forums, primarily in marginal seats, to give voters an opportunity to meet and question the people who are seeking their vote.
- Written and oral representations to federal and state/territory parliaments and their agencies
- Distribution of Viewpoint to Australian parliamentarians
- Release of media releases.

== History ==
The Australian Christian Coalition (ACC) was founded in 1995 by John Gagliardi, a lay leader of a large Pentecostal church in Brisbane. Gagliardi had held journalistic positions as editor of the Townsville Bulletin and as a presenter for Channel 10 news. Co-founders include John McNicoll, a retired Baptist minister turned lobbyist in Canberra, and John Miller, a Baptist who held lay leadership positions within his Canberra church.

The organisation changed its name to the Australian Christian Lobby in March 2001.

In September 2012, the then prime minister, Julia Gillard cancelled a speech to the ACL's annual conference after the organisation's managing director, Jim Wallace, argued that the health effects of homosexuality on individuals were worse than smoking.

The Australian Christian Lobby has threatened to take the unprecedented step of campaigning against a Coalition government, warning Liberal MPs that it could direct members to support minor right-wing parties if they did not follow their policy of a people's vote.

=== Attacks against ACL ===
In October 2014, ACL held a conference at the Hyatt Hotel Canberra which was followed by complaints to the hotel and a social media campaign directed against it. In response the hotel issued a statement saying that they "don't discriminate against guests who want to conduct lawful business at Hyatt hotels". This subsequently "attracted considerable community support for the commercial rights of the Hyatt and threatened the free-speech credentials of the marriage-equality lobby". In September 2016, a meeting at a Sydney hotel, planned by ACL to discuss same-sex marriage issues, had to be cancelled due to "threats of violence" to staff and guests. The 100 participants subsequently met at another venue.

In December 2016, a van containing four 9 kg propane-gas bottles was set on fire beside the ACL building, which caused $100,000 damage to ACL's empty offices. Following the incident ACL managing director Lyle Shelton stated that it had been an attack targeting the organisation due to its public advocacy. During a Senate Estimates hearing in October 2017, the Australian Federal Police Commissioner, Andrew Colvin, stated that the AFP and the Director of Public Prosecutions believed that the actions of the driver, Jayden Duong, were not politically or religiously motivated and his main motivation had been to commit suicide. The assistant commissioner, Justine Saunders, the Chief Police Officer for the Australian Capital Territory, also stated that Duong had selected the ACL's car park to set off the explosion as it was isolated.

Several people having an affiliation with ACL have had their employers targeted and have been attacked through social media. Those employers have included an accountancy firm, a technology company, an IT firm and a university. In March 2017, ACL was granted permission by The Australian Charities and Not-for-profits Commission to keep their board members' names secret on the grounds of public safety, following abuse and threats. In March 2017 the Anglican Archbishop of Sydney, Glenn Davies, and Catholic Archbishop of Sydney, Anthony Fisher, criticised the attacks by social media users directed against members of the ACL.

On 9 May 2017, ACL hosted a seminar in Melbourne entitled "Is Safe Schools safe?", with the speakers John Whitehall, Professor of Paediatrics at the University of Western Sydney, and Elisabeth Taylor from ACL. About 30 people, several of whom had their faces covered with bandanas, blocked the entrance to the seminar stopping the majority of the attendees from entering.

During the campaigning associated with the Australian Marriage Law Postal Survey, the ACL received threats and suspicious packages were sent to their office which necessitated the evacuation of 30 staff at the Canberra mail-centre. The Lobby's offices were also egged, and received letters containing glitter.

== Constituency and influence ==
One of the main criticisms of the ACL is that it overstates the constituency it represents. Jim Wallace, one time managing director of the ACL, confirmed that the organisation represents its supporters only but stated that they also contact a group of representative theologians representing a number of denominations.

While its claimed constituency is unproven, John Warhurst, emeritus professor of political science at the Australian National University said that ACL has been successful in establishing itself "in the top echelon of lobbying groups", has the "professional knowledge to run modern election campaigns" and "will not go away". Warhurst notes that ACL as an evangelical lobby group is more politically influential than the Family First party.

Academic assessments of the ACL's influence differ. Marion Maddox, a professor at Macquarie University, said in 2016 that ACL has achieved "remarkable influence with political leaders on both sides". In contrast, Geoffrey Robinson, a senior lecturer at Deakin University, stated in 2015 that the ACL's influence had been decreasing since 2013 and the organisation had become only influential on the conservative side of politics.

Former attorney-general Robert McClelland said in a speech to the ACL's 2012 conference that those protesting against the organisation would not have recognised that it had supported amendments to 84 pieces of commonwealth legislation that removed discrimination against same-sex couples. In contrast, in 2012 the leader of the Australian Greens, Christine Milne, stated that the ACL's "whole focus is to attack the gay community" and as it is a private company with no affiliated churches, it was not suitable for the prime minister to attend its events.

Some Christian leaders have stated the ACL's campaigning against gay rights does not represent the stance of all Christians, and several Christian Churches have stated they are frustrated and concerned about the ACL's actions on the issue. In 2013 Professor Rodney Smith from Sydney University stated that while the ACL was supported by senior members of the Anglican, Orthodox and Catholic churches, many other members of the churches do not agree with the Lobby's positions.

In 2016 the Australian Sex Party called for the ACL to be deregistered as a charity on the grounds that its main focus is political campaigning against same-sex marriage.

The ACL has been described as extremist, possibly influenced by Christian dominionism and reconstructionism. This is denied by the ACL. LGBTIQ advocate Carl Katter has said that the aim of the group is to "facilitate and perpetuate hate".

== New campaign strategy ==
Martyn Iles said, "It used to be that our ACL leaders doing the lobbying could do a great deal. But these days, that’s not so much the case. Politicians want to know what difference their decisions will make in the electorate. They want to know where the votes are and whether there are 'activated' people who are going to do something about the issue." Iles said he wants to transform ACL into a US-style conservative activist group that mimics the tactics of progressives, said the lobby group was using the election to test the effectiveness of its campaign. "The campaign itself is targeted, and the reason for that is we want to build ourselves into primarily a grassroots activist movement and, as we learn how to do that, we are running targeted campaigns to test what we are doing."

During the 2019 Australian federal election, ACL supporters ran a campaign in which "Hundreds of thousands of leaflets, countless phone calls, and an extensive digital campaign went into seats like McMahon, Canning, Bass, Chisholm, Boothby and Petrie," according to Iles.

== Ancillary organisations ==
ACL has established the Lachlan Macquarie Institute, as a training organisation for public policy influencers.

ACL provided the seed-funding for, and works with, the Human Rights Law Alliance (HRLA). The HRLA focuses on what it says are freedoms neglected by the Australian Human Rights Commission, such as: 'freedom of speech, freedom of religion, freedom of conscience and freedom of association'.

ACL has established the Centre for Human Dignity led by Wendy Francis, which it describes as "an initiative" which is "against sexual exploitation".

== Focus of lobbying ==
=== Supports ===
ACL supports:

- Marriage as defined by 2004 amendments to the Marriage Act, where the definition is, "marriage means the union of a man and a woman to the exclusion of all others, voluntarily entered into for life" ACL and others campaigned unsuccessfully for the 'no-change' case in the Australian Marriage Law Postal Survey.
- The nuclear family comprising a mother and father and their biological children with the family as the best environment for children.
  - The right of parents rights to subject their children to conversion therapy to change children's sexual orientation.
- Removal of superannuation-discrimination for same-sex couples.
- Censorship of:
  - Video games.
  - The internet through an internet blacklist.
  - Outdoor advertising.
  - Slaughter art show.
- The right of rugby player Israel Folau to publicly quote controversial bible verses without contract termination. ACL established a donation site to raise funds for legal fees for his defence. with the public donating $2 million in 24 hours. Following Folau's settlement with Rugby Australia and NSW Rugby, he thanked his supporters, "as well as" Martyn Iles and the ACL.
- Religious freedom for Christians globally.
- Provision of asylum for Christian refugees.
- Christian chaplains in schools.
- Recognising Indigenous Australians in the Constitution of Australia.
- Increasing foreign aid spending.

=== Opposes ===
ACL opposes:

- Abortion, and the establishment of safe zones to protect women seeking abortion from harassment by protestors.
- Euthanasia.
- Surrogacy.
- Certain LGBTIQ rights in Australia, such as same-sex marriage, LGBTIQ parenting and LGBTIQ adoption, and have campaigned for the rights of church-owned schools to be able to legally discriminate on the basis of sexual orientation.
  - Same-sex marriage: opposing any amendment to the 2004 definition of marriage in the Marriage Act 1961 and limits on speech against, initially also opposing legal recognition same sex civil unions.
  - Surrogacy and adoption by gays and lesbians.
  - Certain treatments of sexuality in school settings.
  - The Safe Schools program and a year 8–12 school program entitled "Respectful Relationships" and asked for the withdrawal of $8 million allocated to the Australia-wide program.
  - Gender transition.
- Current halal certification arrangements.
- Gambling.
- Prostitution.
- The introduction of a charter of rights by the Commonwealth Government.

== See also ==
- Abortion in Australia
- Anti-abortion movements
- Australian Catholic Bishops' Conference
- Australian Marriage Law Postal Survey
- Christian politics in Australia
- Christian right
- Christianity in Australia
- Coalition for Marriage (Australia)
- Euthanasia in Australia
- Family First New Zealand
- FamilyVoice Australia
- Human rights in Australia
- Marriage Alliance
- Marriage in Australia
- National Organization for Marriage
