= FamilyVoice Australia =

Australian Christian conservative group

- Founded: 1973 as the Australian Festival of Light
- Purpose: Promotion of Christian family values
- Region served: Australia
- Key people: Peter Downie
- Website: www.familyvoice.org.au
- Formerly called: Australian Festival of Light and Community Standards Organisation

FamilyVoice Australia is a conservative Christian organisation. It was known as Festival of Light Australia from 1973 to 2008, and under the leadership of Rev Fred Nile, it rose to public prominence in the 1990s for its opposition to LGBT rights. Festival of Light's stated mission was to be "a Christian ministry to the nation, promoting true family values in the light of the wisdom of God". The name was changed to FamilyVoice Australia on 1 July 2008 in order to eliminate confusion with the many other festivals or groups around the world called "Festival of Light" or "Festival of Lights". Key activities of FamilyVoice Australia are providing information to supporters, churches and community leaders and lobbying on issues of concern.

== History ==
FamilyVoice was founded in Adelaide in 1972 as the Australian Festival of Light and Community Standards Organisation, with the name and inspiration from United Kingdom's Nationwide Festival of Light founded in 1971.

It came out of work by the Australian Community Standards Organisation (CSO), which had recently merged with the South Australian Moral Action Committee. Moral Action Committee members included Reverend Lance Shilton, Rector of Holy Trinity Anglican Church in Adelaide and later Anglican Dean of Sydney; Dr John H. Court, then senior lecturer in psychology at Flinders University, and Peter Daniels. South Australian delegates at a CSO meeting in Melbourne in 1972 led the move to hold "a nationwide act of Christian witness, similar to that conducted in Britain last year (Festival of Light)".

Rev. Lance Shilton then initiated an interdenominational steering committee to establish the Australian Festival of Light at a meeting in Toorak Gardens, Adelaide, in November 1972. The committee appointed Dr Court as chairman; Rev Shilton and Mrs Roslyn Phillips as deputy chairmen, and Peter Daniels as publicity officer.

The Festival of Light was formally launched in Adelaide in June 1973 with a media conference and the release of a new book by Dr Court and SA journalist Helen Caterer, Stand Up and Be Counted, which aimed to motivate readers to defend publicly their Christian faith and values.

Lance Shilton's network of contacts through the Australian Evangelical Alliance and the Community Standards Organisation led to the formation of independent branches of Festival of Light (which later included the Community Standards Organisation) in all Australian states. Reverend Fred Nile accepted leadership of the NSW branch in July 1973, becoming the full-time director in January 1974, and greatly increased the organisation's activity and public profile.

It was less active after the mid-1980s, but has undergone reconstitution since 2003.

In 2004 the national body of the former Festival of Light Australia was formed under a new constitution, with a national office in Adelaide and branches in South Australia and Queensland. Western Australia, Victoria and New South Wales branches followed in 2005–2007. In 2004 Dr. David Phillips, formerly chairman of the South Australian branch of Festival of Light, became national president of Festival of Light Australia.

On 1 July 2008 its name was changed to FamilyVoice Australia in order to avoid ambiguity, especially on the internet. Dr David Phillips remains the national president and is supported by five state officers, a national research officer and a national administrator.

== Views and lobbying efforts ==
While it has "totally opposed any violence or attacks directed against homosexual men or lesbians", FamilyVoice has consistently campaigned against LGBT rights in Australia. FamilyVoice Australia has opposed the homosexual vilification amendment, same-sex marriage, altruistic surrogacy, and adoption of children by same-sex couples, arguing that children "do best when raised by a mother and a father" and that "a child is at significantly greater risk of abuse in any family type other than an intact two-parent family". FamilyVoice has also campaigned against sex toys being sold in Australian supermarkets, the decriminalisation of sex work and lobbied for the MA 15+ (Mature Accompanied) classification category to be tightened to R18+ classification (Restricted) for computer games. FamilyVoice has lobbied for mandatory internet filtering following successful campaigns for Internet censorship in the United Kingdom.

FamilyVoice Australia has organised a lecture tour for the Christian philosopher Vishal Mangalwadi, who believes that without Christian belief, Western society will experience social collapse. FamilyVoice has criticised philosopher Peter Singer, considering his views "highly offensive".

FamilyVoice joined with other Christian advocacy groups in opposing the listing of Mifepristone on the Pharmaceutical Benefits Scheme. At one rally against abortion Geoffrey Bullock stated that 96 per cent of abortions performed in South Australia were for "social convenience reasons". FamilyVoice has made submissions on the partial defence of provocation in New South Wales after Tasmania, Victoria, Western Australia, the Northern Territory and Queensland have changed their laws.

FamilyVoice is opposed to the decriminalisation of cannabis, claiming the drug has "no medical use". FamilyVoice have made submissions to inquiries on drug and alcohol treatment, the provision of alcohol to minors and the prevention of drug and alcohol abuse.

FamilyVoice has made submissions on referendum machinery, bicameral parliaments and electoral funding, opposing caps on political donations

FamilyVoice Australia submissions have included other issues such as human rights, euthanasia, childcare funding, paid parental leave, the commercial television industry code of practice, suicide, men's health, religious freedom, "adult" stores, alcohol-related violence, child sex abuse, equal opportunity laws, reproductive technology and gambling.

FamilyVoice Australia partnered with the Coalition for Marriage and other groups opposed to same-sex marriage, in campaigning for a 'No' vote in the 2017 Australian Marriage Law Postal Survey.

== Responses ==
The 1973 Proclamation of Australian Festival of Light reached out to "all people of good will", but most of those who responded had a Christian background. In 1974 Flinders University historians Hilliard and Warhurst noted that supporters of Festival of Light were mainly Protestants of the Evangelical tradition and conservative Catholics and that some other Christians tended to be critical of the organisation's "overconfident presentation of complex moral issues in simple black and white terms". Hilliard and Warhurst said that despite Festival of Light's promotion among churches around South Australia, some clergy were unresponsive and many congregations did not get involved.

Sometimes there was open controversy. A week before the 1973 visit of Mary Whitehouse, students at the University of Adelaide, Flinders University and the South Australian Institute of Technology (now the University of South Australia) began a "Festival of Fright" campaign against the Australian Festival of Light events, saying, "These latter-day Calvins should be met by as much opposition as freedom-loving people can muster...."

In 1978, South Australian Attorney-General Peter Duncan criticised the Festival of Light, saying: "I believe there is a desperate need to develop a tolerant society… I don't think this sort of hysteria and prejudging that is generated by the Festival of Light does anything to further this move." Duncan also spoke out against the 1978 Festival of Light-sponsored visit to Australia by Whitehouse, calling her "an agent of darkness" and an "opponent of freedom."

=== Influence on legislation ===
The September 1978 Mary Whitehouse visit was influential in the Festival of Light campaign against X-rated pornography. On 12 September, following national media coverage of the pornography problem in relation to the Whitehouse tour, Victorian Liberal Premier Rupert Hamer announced that his government would move to tighten pornography laws, particularly in relation to children.

On 10 September 1978 at the Whitehouse rally in Adelaide's Rymill Park, Festival of Light circulated a petition calling for tighter control of pornography, later signed by over 14,000 South Australians. On 20 September, Labor Premier Don Dunstan delivered a blistering attack on the Festival of Light in the South Australian House of Assembly, calling the petition pamphlet "disgraceful". He said a graph accompanying the petition was "one of the most untruthful pieces of work that I have ever come across" because it showed a rise in South Australian rates of reported rape following a 1974 law allowing the sale of hardcore pornography, compared with Queensland where hardcore pornography was banned and rape reports remained steady. Dunstan said rape convictions should have been used instead of reports, and the graph should have extended beyond 1975.

However, on 27 September, Liberal MP Bruce Eastick defended the Festival of Light petition and graph, and said part of the Premier's speech the week before had been a "blatant untruth". Dr Eastick said rape report statistics from South Australia and Queensland after 1975 showed that "it is quite clear that the problem in South Australia is almost four times as serious as that which exists in Queensland". Liberal MP Mrs Jennifer Adamson later fully documented the statistics in the Festival of Light petition pamphlet, and listed the academic credentials of the founding chairman Dr John Court.

Dr Eastick also pointed out that a child pornography magazine Just Boys had been banned in New South Wales but had been classified for unrestricted sale in South Australia "alongside the Women's Weekly".

On 28 September, the Dunstan government introduced the Criminal Law (Prohibition of Child Pornography) Bill, which passed both houses of parliament without dissent on 21 November 1978 after opposition amendments tightened its provisions. The passage of the bill in an amended form was widely seen as a response to the Festival of Light campaign. Liberal MP Keith Russack noted, "The many signatures on petitions presented to this Parliament is a significant indication of the South Australian public’s concern."

== Events ==
Festival of Light hosted many events including visits by overseas speakers such as:

- 1973 Mary Whitehouse

The first major event of the Australian Festival of Light was the visit by "Clean-up TV" campaigner Mary Whitehouse to Sydney and Adelaide in October 1973. It was Shilton, while on a trip to Britain in May 1973, who invited Whitehouse to Australia. Whitehouse spoke to overflow crowds in the Sydney Town Hall and the Adelaide Festival Theatre, and led a march of 10,000 people to Light's Vision in Adelaide on 14 October 1973, where the Festival of Light Proclamation setting out the breadth of its concerns was read out and endorsed by a total crowd of over 12,000.

Mary Whitehouse later recalled her first visit to Australia as one of the big events of her life. She told her biographer Max Caulfield that because of the intense media interest, "I became better known in Australia in three and a half weeks than I did in Britain in ten years."

- 1976 Malcolm Muggeridge

Malcolm Muggeridge's Australian Festival of Light speaking tour was equally successful in October 1976. An estimated 35,000 people heard his keynote address to the Family Celebration in Sydney's Hyde Park on 10 October; he spoke to a capacity audience in Adelaide's Festival Theatre on 14 October and significant crowds in other cities throughout Australia and New Zealand.

- 1978 Mary Whitehouse

Mary Whitehouse successfully toured Australia for a second time in September 1978, amid controversy over UK court action she had initiated against an offensive poem about Jesus published in a homosexual paper. Student demonstrators picketed her meetings and Brisbane police arrested two youths and five girls who threw strawberry pies at her. Despite the protests, large crowds came out in support – including 5000 at an Adelaide march Mary led from Rymill Park to Parliament House on 10 September 800 in Hobart, 1000 in Brisbane, 2000 in Melbourne, 1500 in Perth where she was welcomed by Premier Sir Charles Court, and 4000 in the Sydney Town Hall on 27 September.

- 1981 Mother Teresa

The Australian Festival of Light and some Catholic leaders invited Mother Teresa to Australia to mark the 1981 United Nations International Year of Disabled Persons. Mother Teresa was the guest speaker at the Festival of Light "The Handicapped Child in the Community" conference, attended by 800 people.

- 1996 Gianna Jessen

Festival of Light Australia sponsored the Australian tour of US teenage singer and anti-abortion activist Gianna Jessen in February and March 1996. Jessen was born alive after a failed instillation abortion attempt left her with brain damage and cerebral palsy. She spoke to packed venues in all states and territories.

- 2010 Bishop Michael Nazir-Ali

The September 2010 Australian tour by a Pakistani-born UK Anglican bishop, Michael Nazir-Ali, was the first major national event under the new FamilyVoice name. Speaking to the media, public and private meetings and seminars for Christian leaders (a total of over 2500 people attended in all mainland capitals), Nazir-Ali expounded the theme of "Courage in a hostile world". He described "the triple jeopardy of aggressive secularism, radical Islam and a misplaced understanding of multiculturalism".

== Awards ==
David and Roslyn Phillips were awarded Centenary Medals in 2001, respectively for "service to family policy and community education as Chairman of the Festival of Light" and for "service to family activities and community education through the Festival of Light".

== Publications ==
1. Light – a quarterly 12-page magazine sent to subscribers throughout Australia as well as some MPs and media outlets, from January 1975 to May 2008.
2. Festival Focus South Australia – a four-page newspaper initially sent to subscribers in SA seven times a year. From 2003, separate state editions were gradually published, beginning with SA and Queensland. In 2008 there were separate quarterly editions of Festival Focus for the five mainland Australian states.

== See also ==
- Anglican Diocese of Sydney
- Australian Catholic Bishops' Conference
- Australian Christian Churches
- Australian Christian Lobby
