= Safe Schools Coalition Australia =

Group advocating for LGBTIQ recognition in schools

- Abbreviation: SSCA
- Formation: 21 October 2010
- Founded at: Victoria
- Dissolved: 1 December 2017; 8 years ago
- Type: NGO
- Purpose: The safety and well-being of same sex attracted, intersex and gender diverse students, staff and families.
- Headquarters: Melbourne
- Members: of SSCA, 52 (2017)
- SSCA Program Director: Craig Comrie

The Safe Schools Coalition Australia (SSCA) was a group of organisations in Australia focused on LGBTIQ people in schools. Its mission was to create safe and inclusive schools for students, families and staff who are in these groups. The primary activity of the SSCA is the Safe Schools Program that was developed to give support to teachers and schools who had been seeking assistance in the creation of a more inclusive environment for LGBTIQ students and their families.

The program began in Victorian schools in 2010 and expanded nationwide in 2013, in the wake of pioneering work in the 1990s by the Gay and Lesbian Teachers and Students Association, primarily in New South Wales. Schools were encouraged to customise the implementation of resources which are provided. The SSCA is managed by The Foundation for Young Australians and funded by various state governments. In October 2016 the federal government said that it would not renew its funding for the program. In December 2016, the Education Department took control of the program in Victoria.

The SSCA initially received bipartisan support from government. There is opposition to the program relating to sexuality and gender concepts being taught in schools. In response an independent review was conducted in 2016. While some changes have been made since the review's findings were published, it recommended no major changes to the program and found that it was consistent with the national curriculum. The report recommended an increase in the availability of guidance on the use of included materials. Other changes recommended and subsequently implemented include making the program only available to high schools, removing role playing activities and the requirement for parental consent before participation.

Increasingly vulnerable to changing political tides, the program faced significant, long term obstacles to institutional implementation. In 2017 the SSCA program ceased in New South Wales, Queensland, South Australia and the Australian Capital Territory pulled out (and with Tasmania to pull out) of the Safe Schools Coalition Australia program, with each developing their own programs. As of July 2017, 54 schools in WA, Tas and NT were nominated as SSCA members. Although it is banned in New South Wales, SSCA is still listed as a resource for Nowra High School and it is claimed that other schools still use the materials.

== Membership ==
The members of the Safe Schools Coalition Australia are The Foundation for Young Australians based in Victoria, Family Planning NSW, the Western Australian AIDS Council, the Sexual Health and Family Planning ACT, Shine SA - Sexual Health Information Networking & Education in South Australia, True Relationships & Reproductive Health, Queensland and Working it out in Tasmania.

Schools are encouraged to join the coalition as members. The coalition began with 11 founding schools, including Methodist Ladies' College, Bellarine Secondary College, Mac.Robertson Girls' High School, Hallam Secondary and Princes Hill Secondary College. St Joseph's College in Melbourne is a Catholic school taking part in the program.

In November 2016 the Salvation Army said it supports the program. Later in November that endorsement was withdrawn with the Salvation Army saying that it, "cannot unconditionally support the Safe Schools programs in Australia in their current form". In December 2016 Bega Valley Shire Council voted to support the program. However, in January 2017 the council rescinded that support.

== Research ==
In describing the aims of the program, the Safe Schools Coalition Australia reports that "75% of same sex attracted young people experience some form of homophobic abuse or bullying... A staggering 80% of young people experienced abuse and bullying while at school", more than anywhere else. The All Of Us resource cites research on same sex attracted and gender diverse youth documented in the report, Writing Themselves in 3, prepared by the La Trobe University's, Australian Research Centre in Sex, Health and Society. Research on intersex Australians published in 2016 shows that, while 2% of Australians fail to complete secondary school, 18% of Australians born with intersex variations fail to do so due to issues around bullying, discrimination and pubertal medical interventions.

Research on student performance comparing those within to those without the program indicated gender diverse and same-sex-attracted young people did better with Safe Schools.

== Safe Schools Program ==
Date	Member schools
October 2010	11
July 2015	360
February 2016	490
September 2016	545
January 2017	304
November 2017	52

The first community-based LGBTIQ youth groups in the fields of social services were established in the United States in the late 1970s. In the 1980s and 1990s a sexual risk discourse dominated LGBTIQ issues in education policy in Victoria. Addressing school bullying with practical steps is a worldwide trend. The Safe Schools Coalition Australia provides resources such as this program as part of The National Safe Schools Framework which deals with the wider causes of bullying.

This voluntary program, developed by the Safe Schools Coalition, commenced in Victoria on 21 October 2010, and received national funding of $8 million in 2013. Federal funding for the program was sought by openly gay Senator Penny Wong, the (ALP) Finance Minister in 2013. It was formally launched in June 2014 by the (Liberal) Abbott government. The program is focused on "challenging the bullying and discrimination of the LGBTIQ community within the school setting".

The program expanded nationally because of its success. Content was created by a number of experts in the field. Melbourne High School teacher Christopher Bush helped produce and write content. The program runs in every state of Australia and the Australian Capital Territory, and is planned to commence in the Northern Territory. As of mid February 2016, 490 schools were members of the program, and 86 organisations were supporters of the coalition. According to the official website as of September 2016, 545 schools are members, up from the February 2016 figure when a campaign against the program commenced. In NSW there were originally 120 schools registered, however the education department determined that 89 of those schools had never accessed resources and had no intention to do so in the immediate future.

The Safe Schools Program contains a range of materials from which principals and teachers may choose to include, allowing educators to decide what is appropriate for their schools. Some schools present no classroom material to students. There are four official guides, three official posters and eight lesson plans. Videos are available to accompany the lessons. In 2015, a teaching manual called All Of Us was launched, following approval by the federal Education Department. Authors of the manual include Margot Fink, a finalist for Young Australian of the Year in 2016. The guide includes information on teaching gender diversity, sexual diversity and intersex topics. Resource content includes a video of same sex attracted and gender diverse youth, as well as intersex film-maker Phoebe Hart. A children's story book, entitled The Gender Fairy, released in January 2016 and promoted by the Safe Schools Coalition, explains transgender issues for young children. Safe Schools Coalition co-founder, Roz Ward has compiled the accompanying notes for teachers and parents. Safe Schools material provides advice for secondary students faced with explicit-content-filters on computers and with resistance to displaying LGBTIQ posters.

The material challenges notions of heteronormativity and promotes acceptance of LGBTIQ people. The goal is to achieve an understanding and tolerance of LGBTIQ individuals through education. Students are given the opportunity to challenge LGBT stereotypes. Another aim is to reduce the incidence of depression, suicide and self-harm. Representatives from Safe Schools are available to meet with parents, students and teachers upon request.

Some school principals reported a decrease in same-sex attracted and gender diverse students being bullied. Testimony from students has explained how the program improves the learning environment. There are reports that the introduction of the program has reduced the prevalence of homophobic and transphobic language at schools. In some instances the mere knowledge that a school is part of the coalition has increased the level of safety felt by LGBTIQ students.

Some parents of students who took part in the program have expressed dislike for changes to school policy in regards to bathroom use. Others have expressed concern that they did not know that this "ideology" was being "imposed" on their children. The Safe Schools Coalition actively encourages people to report any inappropriate content.

== Reception ==
The program has been supported by the majority of state governments, as well as psychologists, gay-support groups and other non-governmental and religious organisations. The program is supported by Beyond Blue, headspace and the Australian Secondary Principals Association.

Advocates for the program point to high levels of homophobic abuse, including in school settings, and high levels of school leaving. Australian LGBTIQ rights activist and academic Rodney Croome welcomed a review as a way of ensuring its funding delivered the outcomes it sought. NSW Labor politician Penny Sharpe has said that opposition is primarily due to homophobia and transphobia. A petition presented by Australian Greens Senator Robert Simms to Parliament in March 2016 contained 70,000 signatures in support of the organisation.

However, the program is opposed by some religious groups, particularly the Christian right, with the program said to be "gagged" on same-sex marriage while the Safe Schools Coalition said there had been "no change to media protocols". The Australian Christian Lobby and the Former National Party senator Bill O'Chee have criticised the program. Former Labor senator Joe Bullock has also criticised Safe Schools. Former Democrats Senator Brian Greig stated that the criticism from religious conservatives echoed the 1997 conservative response to "Here for Life", the anti-suicide program introduced by the Keating government's Carmen Lawrence for gay and lesbian teenagers. After conservatives described it as “promoting homosexuality” and “recruiting children”, the newly elected Howard government cancelled the Here for Life program.

Various aspects of the program have been criticised by The Australian newspaper. In July 2015, the Australian Christian Lobby lodged a 10,891-signature petition with the Queensland parliament in relation to the Safe Schools program. The petition incorporated wording from a Safe Schools student resource. However the Clerk of the Parliament would not permit that wording on the Queensland parliament's website because of the "intemperate" language. The petition was subsequently tabled with that offending wording removed.

On 14 February 2016 the education minister, Simon Birmingham, described the lessons prepared by the coalition as having "reasonable objectives". Birmingham stated that controversy over the program was "very unhelpful because the debate that seems to be occurring in the public space is one of whether or not we should be teaching inclusiveness and tolerance in our schools". Some of the negative commentary surrounding the program has been attributed to the belief that young people who are exposed to LGBTIQ issues might then change their sexuality. The current (as of November 2017) federal government's policy is not to fund the program beyond 2017. Resources will still be available for schools to use beyond that date. Labor's policy is to expand the Safe Schools Coalition.

External media

Images
- Change is coming poster
- Classroom poster

Video
- Cory Bernardi Speech to the Senate
- George Christensen Speech to the House of Representatives

In February 2016, under privilege of Parliament, George Christensen claimed the program exposed students to inappropriate sexual material. Christensen also likened the program to a "pedophile grooming a victim", said the program was attempting to introduce into schools "queer gender theory" and "marxist ideology" that should be limited to universities. The Safe Schools Coalition dismissed those claims in their entirety.

== Louden Review ==
A review was announced by the Turnbull Liberal/National Coalition government on 26 February 2016, after Coalition backbenchers George Christensen and Cory Bernardi raised concerns over what they claimed was the "sexualised" nature of the program, and forty-three Coalition backbenchers including former leader Tony Abbott had signed a petition calling for the program's closure. The review did not consider the contents of the Minus 18 website, or the contents of the network partners’ websites. The review was conducted by University of Western Australia’s Professor Bill Louden. The process included interviews with a range of individuals and groups associated with the program.

On 11 March 2016 the Review of Appropriateness and Efficacy of the Safe Schools Coalition Australia Program Resources was published.

=== Findings ===
The review revealed that opponents to the program had made statements that grossly misrepresented and exaggerated the nature of the program. Coalition MPs who support Safe School such as Warren Entsch said the concerns were being pushed by external lobby groups. Labor leader Bill Shorten labelled the Christensen group "ideologues ... trying to impose a 1950s view of the world".

"The review does not consider the contents of the Minus 18 website, or the contents of the network partners’ websites, ...
...
All of the official resources are consistent with the intent and objectives of the program, in that they focus on one or both of the SSCA’s two overall aims, reducing homophobic and transphobic behaviour and intersex prejudice, and increasing support for same sex attracted, intersex and gender diverse students."

— William Louden, Review of Appropriateness and Efficacy of the Safe Schools Coalition Australia Program Resources

The review did not find that any of the official resources were inappropriate. It found that the content in guideline documents was consistent with the aims of the program and that the language and content was suitable. All lesson plans were found to be consistent with the aims of the program as were all the posters. No harm was expected to come from primary schools students viewing the material, just that they may not comprehend some terms such as transphobia or homophobia. The level of interaction between schools and parents was found to be appropriate.

The Safe School Coalition has links to affiliate, third-party organisations and have jointly produced resources. Several of these resources, including Stand Out, created in 2011 by the Safe Schools Coalition Victoria and Minus18 were part of the Louden Review. The review found that, "The three resources created by young people, OMG I’m Queer, OMG My Friend’s Queer and Stand Out, are not intended as classroom resources. They are not normally circulated to primary schools and in some states only circulated to secondary schools on request. They normally are available either in the school library or through the student support centre. They are suitable for use by individual secondary students but may not be suitable for use in some faith-based schools."

== Criticisms ==
In May 2016, Queenslander of the Year and transgender woman Cate McGregor, who "had been asked to be an Ambassador for the program and had initially agreed", subsequently said that she does not agree that the Safe Schools program is the best way to support transgender children. McGregor said she objects to the program as she believes it is underpinned by a political ideology with which she does not agree, saying that the program "teaches a derivative of queer theory, which I believe leads trans people into a blind alley". McGregor was subsequently stood down as the patron of Kaleidoscope Australia for her opposition to the Safe Schools program. McGregor expressed her disappointment.

However, in May 2018, McGregor declared she had been wrong about the program. "It's an excellent program, and it saves lives." "I should have been a supporter from the start. I regret that I wasn't." "Young trans people need an ally, and I could have been one." "I'm high profile. They looked up to me. I could have helped, and I didn't, and I regret that." In her column in Fairfax Media she said "to my chagrin, I failed to anticipate the ammunition I offered to those like Miranda Devine and Lyle Shelton who refuse outright to accept the reality and legitimacy of trans identity." "Trans kids are still doing it tough. Mainly because of cruel religious fanatics and their enablers."

In June 2016, La Trobe University suspended Roz Ward, the British academic and activist who "runs the Safe Schools Coalition" through the university's Australian Research Centre in Sex, Health and Society, for saying she wanted to get rid of the "racist" Australian flag and replace it with a red flag, "and my work is done". Ward was also suspended from the Safe Schools program. The Prime Minister Malcolm Turnbull said Ward's actions "underlined concerns many people had about how the program was managed". Ward's solicitors wrote to the university's Vice-Chancellor, John Dewar, urging him to withdraw all allegations and reinstate her by 10am Monday, otherwise legal action would ensue. While Dewar defended the University's actions, he reinstated Ward, with the Teachers Union saying Ward would be then able to resume supporting young people who are bullied. Beyondblue provided almost $600,000 to La Trobe University to administer the Safe Schools program. However, its chairman, Jeff Kennett, threatened to withdraw future funding and called for Ward to resign because of her "extreme political views".

In July 2016, members of Sydney's Chinese community lodged a petition containing more than 17,000 signatures, against the Safe Schools program. The chairman of the Confederation of Indian Australian Associations has said, "It should not be given that platform in the school lessons, the majority of Indians feel … school is not an appropriate place to bring this subject up."

Dr Kevin Donnelly, who advocates for conservative viewpoints in discussions of education and established an institute which promotes the inclusion of Christian beliefs in schools and was previously co-chair of the National Curriculum Review and Senior Research Fellow at the Australian Catholic University, has argued that the program may over-ride parents' rights as primary caregivers and impose an agenda on their children which they might not accept. Donnelly has also said there is a lack of transparency with the program in New South Wales.

The Australian Human Rights Commission expressed concern over attempts to impose parental consent requirements, stating that there needed to be careful consideration of its impact on children struggling with sexual orientation, gender identity or intersex status, and stating "while we recognise the rights of parents to be informed and engaged in their child’s education, it is important to ensure children who have not yet ‘come out’ to their family can still access the program and its resources.”

Former Prime Minister John Howard has said, "What's disappointed me is an issue like Safe Schools. When that emerged it should have been hit on the head by centre-right governments at federal and state level".

In April 2017, Victorian education officials conceded there was a lack of hard evidence on the rates of homophobic bullying in schools to justify the decision to mandate the Safe School program.

On 9 May 2017 the Australian Christian Lobby hosted a seminar in Melbourne entitled Is Safe Schools safe?, with the speakers, Professor of Paediatrics at the University of Western Sydney, John Whitehall and Dr Elisabeth Taylor from ACL. About 30 people, several of whom had their faces covered with bandanas, blocked the entrance to the seminar stopping the majority of the attendees from entering. Safe Schools activists from the Community Action Against Homophobia group protested outside a similar event in Sydney.

In Canberra there were "acts of intimidation" made against those opposed to the Safe Schools Program. Anti safe schools signs were "torn up, burnt and defaced with threats to kill".

In August 2017, a rally to protest against the Safe Schools program in Canberra was "effectively drowned out by vocal supporters" of the program.

=== Australian Marriage Law Postal Survey ===
Issues relating to the Safe Schools program were raised during the Australian Marriage Law Postal Survey debate. The head of the Australian Christian Lobby wrote in August 2017 that the survey would be a referendum on safe schools, and the Australian Conservatives political party claimed that "Safe Schools and others like it will be mandatory in schools" if same-sex marriage was legalised. There is however a new program called Respectful Relationships which is different to Safe Schools, and was developed in response to recommendations made by the Australian Royal Commission on Family Violence. The Respectful Relationships program covers topics such as emotional literacy, anger management, coping skills, problem solving skills, anti-bullying, how to seek help from others, and gender equality.

In September 2017, the book The Gender Fairy, promoted by the Safe Schools Coalition, featured in a television ad released in conjunction with the Australian Marriage Law Postal Survey for the "No" campaign. The ad incorporates the words, "Only you know whether you are a boy or a girl".

== Federal position ==
Education Minister Simon Birmingham outlined the federal government's action in response to the Louden Review in a media statement. The Turnbull Liberal/National Coalition government was quick to adopt changes to the program following the review. Some of the actions taken by the Turnbull government were not recommended in the review. The imposed limits included changes to some materials, limiting access to secondary schools as some material was not easily understood by younger students, and requiring parent opt-ins. Federal President of the Australian Education Union Correna Haythorpe criticised the decision requiring parent body consent before a school could instigate the program saying that decision should be made by educators.

The Federal Government ceased its funding of the Safe Schools program in October 2016.

== State and Territory Government positions ==
The program operates extensively in Victoria and is fully funded by the state government. State governments are also fully responsible for directly funded programs in South Australia and the Australian Capital Territory. Several schools in Western Australia, Queensland, Tasmania and the Northern Territory remain signed up to national Safe Schools registry.

=== New South Wales ===
Following the launch of a Safe Schools-based teaching resource, NSW Education Minister Adrian Piccoli ordered his department to immediately withdraw the material, stating "Safe Schools materials are only to be used strictly in accordance with the revised guidelines established by the federal government," with the Minister tasking Mark Scott, the Secretary of the NSW Education Department, to undertake a review of the program. In its report, released in November, the committee "recommends the NSW Education Department requires schools under the Controversial Issues in Schools policy to consult with parents prior to any implementation of the Safe Schools program, and require that parents choose whether to opt in to this program".

In September 2016, NSW students were told not to participate in any class lessons involving Safe Schools Coalition materials without the consent of their parents.

In February 2017, it was announced that NSW public school teachers were provided with, "a list of resources that should not be used."

In April 2017, it was announced that NSW government will replace the Safe Schools Program with a broader anti-bullying program.

In December 2017, NSW Opposition Leader Luke Foley said that the Safe Schools program will "never return" under a Labor government.

=== Victoria ===
In March 2016, following the Louden Review, the Victorian Premier Daniel Andrews took issue that students will now require parental permission to attend the Safe Schools program. He "vowed to defend its place in every Victorian secondary school", while the NSW Premier Mike Baird disagreed, saying "parental engagement is a good thing."

On 15 May 2016, it was reported that the Victorian Government will spend about $1 million of its own funds to run the Safe Schools Program and will include those elements dropped by the Federal Government. They have subsequently added new links to optional resources from The Gayby Project produced by the makers of the Australian documentary film Gayby Baby for students in grade five to year 10. All state secondary schools in Victoria are to be members of the SSCA by 2018.

In December 2016 Safe Schools Coalition Australia has severed its ties with the Safe Schools Coalition Victoria.

In December 2016, the Victorian Government said it will take responsibility for and "overhaul" the Safe Schools program, with the government cutting its ties with both Ward and La Trobe University. In January 2017, it was reported that a new Victorian manager is to be appointed.

The Victorian government has pledged to fully fund the program in Victoria, and has established Safe Schools Victoria. The Victorian opposition education spokesman Tim Smith has said, if elected, he would replace the program with a broader anti-bullying program, as NSW has done.

In February 2018 a petition against Safe Schools was signed by 16,000 Victorians.

=== Queensland ===
The program began in Queensland from the start of the second semester in 2015. Annastacia Palaszczuk pledged support for Safe Schools during the 2015 Queensland state election but as of March 2016 had not made any announcements.

In September 2016, Queensland students were told not to participate in any class lessons involving Safe Schools Coalition materials without the consent of their parents.

In June 2017, the Queensland Government announced that it will not fund the program when the Federal Government ceases funding the Safe Schools Program in October 2017. Queensland has withdrawn from the Safe Schools Coalition Program. The Liberal National Party has said, in September 2017, if they are elected to form government they will, "dump the Safe Schools program".

In September 2017 there was what was described as "aggressive altercations" to prevent people entering a Brisbane church where a Safe Schools seminar was being held. A police statement and camera footage do not support the protesters version of what took place, saying, "there was no record of any cars hurtling towards protesters, nor any other assault or injury".

=== South Australia ===
The South Australian Education Minister lamented the federal government's response to the successful program, which was launched in that state on 13 June 2014. In September 2016, South Australian students were told not to participate in any class lessons involving Safe Schools Coalition materials without the consent of their parents. South Australia is to develop its own programs, abandoning the national Safe Schools scheme. South Australia has withdrawn from the Safe Schools Coalition Program. The South Australian opposition said it will replace the Safe Schools program if elected.

=== Western Australia ===
In September 2016, Western Australian students were told not to participate in any class lessons involving Safe Schools Coalition materials without the consent of their parents.

=== Tasmania ===
In 2016 the Safe Schools Program was "rolled out" in 20 Tasmanian schools. In April 2017 it was reported that Tasmania will scrap its support for the Safe Schools program, replacing it with a comprehensive anti-bullying scheme.

=== Australian Capital Territory ===
In August 2016, the ACT Chief Minister, Andrew Barr, committed $100,000 to the Safe Schools Program in the Territory. The Australian newspaper reported that this would enable restrictions imposed on the national scheme to be circumvented.

The ACT government has pledged to fully fund the program in the ACT and is developing a program for "sexually and gender diverse students, staff and families". As of 2017 the ACT is no longer a member of the Safe Schools Coalition Program. The new program will have a change of name with the ACT Education Minister saying it, "won't be defined as a program because then that implies that you're delivering a class or a program on something".

In August 2017 Liberal politician Elizabeth Kikkert speaking in the ACT Legislative Assembly said that "13-year-old girls [were asked] to fantasise about sexual intercourse". Opposition education spokesman Andrew Wall tabled a petition and asked the ACT government to withdraw support for the program. In response, Deputy Chief Minister, Yvette Berry said Mr Wall should be "ashamed of himself" for bringing the petition forward.

In September 2017 it was reported that Education Minister Yvette Berry, "will soon launch" the ACT's answer to Safe Schools program.

=== Northern Territory ===
One Northern Territory school has signed up for the program.

== Positions of political parties ==
Party	Stance	Notes and references
Christians	Oppose	
Coalition	Oppose	Both Coalition parties oppose the program.
Conservatives	Oppose	
Greens	Support	
Labor	Varies by state and territory	NSW Labor opposes the program. Other branches of the party either support the program or have an ambiguous position.
One Nation	Oppose	
Socialist Alliance	Support	Founder Roz Ward ran as a candidate for the Socialist Alliance.

== See also ==
- Education in Australia
- Gayby Baby
- Kids Helpline
- La Trobe University § Controversies
- LGBT rights in Australia
- National School Chaplaincy Programme
- Suicide among LGBTQ youth
- Wear it Purple Day
- Roz Ward
