= Wear it Purple Day =

Australian annual LGBTQIA+ awareness day

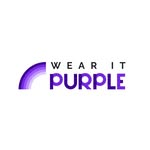
- Frequency: Annually
- Country: Australia
- Inaugurated: 15 October 2010
- Founders: Katherine Hudson and Scott Williams
- Previous event: 29 August 2025
- Next event: 28 August 2026
- Website: wearitpurple.org

Wear it Purple Day is an annual LGBTQIA+ awareness day especially for young people, based in Australia. Supporters wear purple to celebrate diversity and young people from the LGBTQIA+ community.

The Day is organised by Wear it Purple, a student run, not-for-profit organisation, providing presentations and workshops.

Businesses, councils, schools, community groups and clubs can participate by wearing purple and hosting events.

== History ==
It is celebrated on the last Friday in August each year in Australia and was launched in 2010. Previous years have celebrated the day in September or October. The day was co-founded by Katherine Hudson and Scott Williams, when Hudson was in high school and Williams was in the first year of university. Hudson graduated from Burwood Girls High School in 2011, which was later a site of controversy due to the Wear it Purple Day events involving screening the film Gayby Baby.

Wear it Purple Day was created in response to the suicide of New Jersey teen Tyler Clementi.

=== Symbolism ===
Hudson states that she "...saw purple as a way of bringing people together from all different backgrounds and creating one thing…a symbol of unity..." Williams found that working with Wear it Purple has given him a more positive perspective.

The first Wear it Purple Day asked participants to wear a purple arm band "...to show support for queer teens at risk." The day's focus has changed from initially being about sorrow and self-harm prevention, to a celebration of rainbow youth and pride.

== Celebrations and support ==
The first Wear it Purple Day in 2010 was supported by the Federal Minister for Health, the Teachers Federation, Coming Out Australia and RUOK?. Members of Parliament from almost all parties attended Wear it Purple Day's inaugural reception. At the reception, Adrian Piccoli (then-Education Minister) mentioned the progress of the pilot Proud Schools program, and committed the continuing the program. The Proud Schools program ceased in 2015.

Wear it Purple Day received a funding grant in 2012 (as part of Mental Health Week) from the NSW Mental Health Association and ACON.

The Sydney Gay and Lesbian Mardi Gras has included a Wear it Purple float in the parade in 2011, 2012, 2013, 2016, 2017 and 2018. Both the 2017 and 2018 floats were run in conjunction with the NSW Police Force GLLOs (Gay and Lesbian Liaison Officers). The Australian Pride Network awarded the Wear it Purple stall at Fair Day with Best Fair Day Youth Stall (2014), and Best Community stall (2016). In a 2011 interview, co-founder Scott Williams highlighted the importance of Mardi Gras to young people, and for Wear it Purple to participate and bring visibility to young rainbow people.

The Department of Health celebrated Wear it Purple Day in 2015 by inviting staff to a forum with guest speakers from headspace, Safe Schools Coalition ACT, and ACT Sexual Health and Family Planning.

The council, City of Sydney has used purple lighting to illuminate town hall to demonstrate their support for the day in 2016.

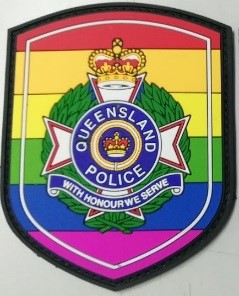
Pride Patch worn by officers of the Queensland Police Service on Wear it Purple Day, 2018

Police have shown their support by wearing purple uniforms while patrolling in the community in Tamworth, Queensland and Southwest Sydney in 2016. Queensland Police Service officers wore purple bootlaces for the day in 2015. Police in NSW have participated in Wear it Purple Day since 2012, through school visits and presentations, community activities and on social media. Police Transport Command officers in Sydney celebrated Wear it Purple Day in 2014 by wearing purple wristbands and decorating their command buses. NSW Police began participating because of their concerns over youth suicide rates and to highlight that police are part of the community, and their role in preventing homophobic and transphobic bullying and crime. Other emergency sector organisations supporting Wear it Purple Day include Queensland Ambulance Service (2015), and in 2014; NSW Emergency Service, the Ambulance Services of NSW, Fire and Rescue NSW, the NSW Rural Fire Service and the Australian Federal Police. Defence staff have also participated, with encouragement from Defence Gay and Lesbian Information Service (DEFGLIS). The Navy's Systems Training School at HMAS Watson hosted events for Wear it Purple Day in 2013.

There has also been strong support from the banking sector, including screenings for employees of Westpac, Macquarie Bank and NAB. Telstra provided support for the Day in 2014 with resource packs on cyber-bullying for all registered schools in Australia.

Other organisations and businesses have hosted purple-themed events including dress-up photo booths and rainbow zinc face-painting, exhibitions with music, art and workshops, and an Instagram Scavenger Hunt.

Morning teas have included purple cupcake stalls and purple-inspired food creations in bake-offs. Northholm Grammar School hosted a fundraising poetry slam for Wear it Purple Day in 2015.

Wear it Purple Day has also been celebrated beyond Australia. In 2013 the Gay, Transgender, Lesbian, Bisexual (GTLB) Diversity Project and Youth Alley hosted celebrations in Timaru (New Zealand).

The 2015 Wear it Purple Day was highlighted by the Andrews Labor government, who marked the day by announcing a round of small grants to support LGBTI young people.

In 2018, residents of Hepburn House aged care facility in Daylesford, showed their support for young queer people by celebrating the day with students from Daylesford Secondary College.

Widespread use of hashtags #wearitpurple and #beproudofwhoyouare included selfies, personal stories and event documentation to demonstrate support and increase visibility.

== Recognition and awards ==
=== Recognition ===
Wear it Purple Day was highlighted as a successful grassroots campaign at the National Safe Schools Symposium in 2012.

The Western Australia Equal Opportunity Commission (WAEOC) celebrated Wear it Purple Day in 2014 by releasing online guidelines: Supporting Sexual and Gender Diversity in Schools. The guidelines focus on assisting students who experience homophobic bullying. For Wear it Purple Day in 2016, WAEOC promoted its participation in the ALLY program, which supports increasing understanding of diversity.

In 2016, co-founder Hudson received recognition for her LGBTI advocacy by featuring in a mural by street artist Kaff-eine in ANZ's Street Art Project.

==== Celebrity recognition ====
Madonna mentioned the Wear it Purple campaign in 2011.

==== Parliamentary recognition ====
Minister Matt Kean highlighted Wear it Purple Day in his inaugural speech to Parliament in 2011.

Penny Sharpe submitted a motion to the NSW Upper House of Parliament in 2012, for the group's achievements to be acknowledged.

Wear it Purple Day 2014 was acknowledged by the Australian Senate in a motion submitted by Senator Sarah Hanson-Young.

=== Awards ===
A student at Victor Harbor High School, Gemma Cole, helped to run Wear It Purple Day at her school in 2011, and then received the 2011 Lions Club Citizenship Award at her graduation in 2011.

NSW’s LGBTI community awarded co-founders Katherine and Scott with the Young Achiever Award at the 2013 Honour Awards.

Jayde Ellis, 2013 spokesperson of Wear it Purple Day, received a Safer Communities Award in the 2014 National Youth Awards.

Teacher Alex Stefan of Colo High School in the Hawkesbury, was nominated for a 2017 Honour Award for starting the first LGBTI group at the school and promoting school-wide celebrations of Wear it Purple Day.

== Opposition and criticism ==
=== 2023 ===
==== Australian Defence Force Academy complaints ====
In 2023, students at the Australian Defence Force Academy (ADFA) complained that they felt pressured to participate in Wear It Purple Day. A spokesperson noted that Defence personnel voluntarily participate in a range of diversity events.

=== 2020 ===
==== Gender fluidity materials ====
In 2020, Mark Latham stated that Wear It Purple Day distributed information which sexualised children. The information about tucking and other topics was from third party websites and the NSW Department of Education stated that these references were uploaded to the teachers' resource hub (education portal) without permission and had been removed.

=== 2018 ===
==== Rainbow flag negative response ====
In 2018, students in Castlemaine Secondary College's Diversity group raised a rainbow flag on the school grounds, alongside Wear It Purple Day, in support of International Day Against Homophobia, Biphobia and Transphobia (IDAHOBIT). Some students loudly expressed their opposition to the flying of the flag on the pole normally used for the Australian flag. In the time since, the school has begun to fly the rainbow flag each day, but it has been subject to vandalism.

=== 2017 ===
==== Opposition in businesses and schools ====
In March 2017, Liberal Senator Eric Abetz complained that the Department of Finance was "reverse bullying", by pressuring staff into participating in Wear it Purple Day.

In an August 2017 commentary piece in The Australian, Kevin Donnelly (Senior Research Fellow at the Australian Catholic University) opposed the Australian Education Union's promotion of Wear it Purple Day. He stated that the campaign was evidence of the "cultural left" dominating the education system. Donnelly had previously noted similar views about the cultural left in a March 2017 opinion piece in the Daily Telegraph. His discussion of identity politics stated that the "LGBTQ agenda" [sic] dominates the education system through activities such as school celebrations of the "national Wear it Purple campaign" [sic].

Miranda Devine has written that Christian employees of organisations which have signed up to the marriage equality campaign, now feel frightened and intimidated at work. Devine claimed that a Telstra employee was re-sent a "mandatory" Wear it Purple event invitation multiple times by executive staff.

==== Alleged "rainbow hijacking" ====
In 2017, parents at Kambala School complained about posters promoting a "Wear it Rainbow" event linked with Wear it Purple Day. It was reported in The Australian that the school was being subjected to "rainbow hijacking" [sic]. The posters were removed because they were not authorised by the school's management, but principal Shane Hogan advised the media that the school would still celebrate the day itself. Angela Priestley's reply to the "rainbow hijacking" article noted that the posters were installed by students, and that the concerned parents should have approached the school's principal.

During an August 2017 interview on 2GB radio with Ray Hadley, NSW Education Minister Rob Stokes noted that school principals had been notified to take care around diversity issues (including Wear it Purple Day) in the context of the marriage equality plebiscite.

=== 2016 ===
==== Rainbow noose meme ====
The Marriage Alliance group created a "rainbow noose" for campaign material against marriage equality, in February 2016. The advertisement depicted a rainbow noose around a praying woman's neck with the tagline "Same sex marriage increases PC bullying in the workplace". Marriage Alliance spokesperson Sophie York told Four Corners that the meme was inspired by a "workplace incident" of a man's concern about receiving an email about his workplace's participation in "Wear Purple day" [sic]. The advertisement was later banned by the Advertising Standards Bureau. The group was condemned for their rainbow noose meme by Tim Watts in Federal Parliament on 4 February 2016.

=== 2015 ===
==== Safe Schools Program ====
The NSW Teachers Federation supports Wear it Purple Day, but during 2015, some schools received criticism in the face of celebrating Wear it Purple Day. Cheltenham Girls’ High School principal Susan Bridge received letters from parents about their disagreement with the introduction of the overarching national framework of Safe Schools, which included "... theme days at the school such as Wear it Purple Day...". Miranda Devine alleged that the celebration of Wear it Purple Day at Cheltenham Girls' High School caused "...some students... [to] ... feel marginalised and excluded if they do not embrace the ideology", with MP Damien Tudehope adding that students are "ostracised" if they do not support "Purple Day" [sic]. David Phillips, then-National Director of FamilyVoice Australia, gave evidence to the Australian Parliament's Legal and Constitutional Affairs References Committee, that students were vilified and bullied if they upheld the traditional definition of marriage and chose not to participate in Wear it Purple Day.

In the time since the ban, some school leaders have supported Wear it Purple Day, but shied away from having their school featured in a press release about the event.

Sydney University law professor, Patrick Parkinson's paper on the Safe Schools Program (profiled in an article in The Australian) alleged that children with "traditional values" could be "bullied or marginalised" for their reaction to Wear it Purple Day (using the day as an example of a related event within the context of the Safe Schools Program). In Josh Taylor's article response, he noted that while Parkinson's view was that "...children from religious households could be bullied for not supporting anti-bullying programs like ... Wear it Purple Day" and that Parkinson had "a long history of work on the conservative side of the debate". In an opinion piece on the Teachers' Christian Fellowship of NSW site, John Gore has suggested that a Christian response would be for schools to redraft their existing school anti-bullying programs and incorporate LGBT issues in school curricula and library resources.

Wear it Purple Day co-founder Katherine Hudson debated with Fred Nile on ABC’s special episode of Q&A (18 June 2015) about homosexual law reform and the Safe Schools Program.

==== Gayby Baby film ====
Film director Maya Newell offered Gayby Baby to be screened in schools ahead of the film's official release for Wear it Purple Day 2015. Producer Charlotte Mars noted that the hybrid-cinema release and school screenings linked with their faith that Australian independent films can make a lasting impact.

Newell presented an event about the film at her alumnus, Burwood Girls' High School (also attended by co-founder of Wear it Purple Day, Katherine Hudson). Up to 50 Australian schools including 20 in New South Wales had organised a simultaneous broadcast of the film on Wear it Purple Day.

However, the film received a NSW statewide ban by Education Minister Adrian Piccoli, even though he had not viewed it. The decision to ban screenings was condemned and labelled as "cruel rubbish" by Daniel Andrews (Victorian State Premier). Tim Wilson (then an Australian Human Rights Commissioner) said that while "Wearing a colour one day a year probably seems trite. But, for the students privately dealing with issues around their sexual orientation or gender identity, it is a beacon of hope. Without a word being mentioned it sends a clear message that there are people who support you".

The film's ban resulted in extensive news coverage and protests to the government. Greens Member for Newtown Jenny Leong said that the positive initiative of the film screening should not be blocked, and suggested the ban was in response to the headlines in the Daily Telegraph. Trevor Khan countered that rather than being a ban of the film, it was an "opt-out arrangement" with the option to screen the film during non-lesson times. Wear it Purple Day co-founder Katherine Hudson told ABC radio that although the Wear it Purple Day campaign had received support from the Government over the years, that in a sense, the ban delegitimized the Day.

The Prefects of Burwood Girls' High School issued a statement on their Facebook page reiterating their dismay at the media coverage, and their support for equality and acceptance for all people. At the original planned time of the film's screening, Burwood Girls' students continued with usual school subjects, but protested by wearing purple pom-poms in their hair.

Mike Baird (New South Wales State Premier) stated that the ban was not about the film's content, but focused on Burwood Girls High School using classtime to show the film for Wear it Purple Day.

Actress Brenna Harding has said that "... the message of Wear It Purple — of support to young LGBTI people and kids with same-sex parents — was in danger of being drowned out..." by the banning of the film Gayby Baby and associated events at some Australian schools. Senator Penny Wong similarly stated that Wear it Purple Day was designed to show LGBTI young people that they are supported, but that rather than addressing bullying, people reverted to sensationalist controversy.

In 2016, the NSW Government asked film producer Charlotte Mars to amend text in a promotional email, regarding the wording around their support for the film.

===== Volume of complaints =====
Documents later obtained under freedom of information laws showed that the Department of Premier and Cabinet received 55 congratulatory messages on the ban, which were outnumbered by 85 complaints about the ban. Reverend Mark Powell alleged that the Wear it Purple Day organisation was operating against the Education Department guidelines and that the volume of complaints was not recorded accurately. The Education Department initially advised reporters at The Guardian that they had not received complaints, and later recanted on this statement to reporters at The Daily Telegraph. Craig Laundy, whose electorate covers Burwood, stated that he had been inundated with calls from parents and community representatives, expressing concern about the planned film screening.

=== 2015 ===
==== Coffee shop signage ====
In 2015, Dubbo coffee shop owner Karen Payne has faced negativity from a customer for her business signage celebrating Wear It Purple Day.

=== 2012 ===
==== Conflict from flyers ====
Students at Craigieburn Secondary College distributed supportive flyers for Wear it Purple Day in 2012, as part of Craigieburn's Same-Sex Attracted Friendly Environment (SSAFE) group. A teacher confiscated and removed some of the flyers, and a student was verbally supported by a peer. The school removed the flyers from the walls, but Principal Julie Robertson stated that this was because the group had not sought permission for the display.

=== 2010 ===
==== Official website blocking ====
After the Wear it Purple website was launched in December 2010, the Department of Education and Training filter blocked it from being viewed on Government school computers.

== Celebration dates and yearly themes ==
Many years of Wear it Purple Day include a theme or associated projects, including:

#	Celebration date	Theme	Details
1	Friday 15 October 2010	Dress Code Project	Encouraging schools to change policies regarding diverse couples at school events such as formals.
2	Friday 2 September 2011	Rainbow Real	A collaborative film project for diverse young people.
3	Friday 7 September 2012		
4	Friday 29 August 2013	Speak Up	The campaign encouraged people to pledge not to use "gay" as a derogatory term. Some student groups focused on an increased celebration of the Day in order to align with the campaign of reducing the usage of "gay" as a connotation for "badness".
5	Friday 29 August 2014	Combatting stereotypes	Giving rainbow youth more autonomy from preconceptions.
6	Friday 28 August 2015	Colour Your Perception	Encouraged people to think about "the diversity of being diverse".
7	Friday 26 August 2016		
8	Friday 25 August 2017	Celebrate	Focused on celebration.
9	Friday 31 August 2018	Empower together	
10	Friday 30 August 2019	Stand up. Stand out.	
11	Friday 28 August 2020	We Are The Change	Focused on the role of encouragement and emphasis on creating effective change.
12	Friday 27 August 2021	Start the Conversation...Keep it Going	To give support to other members in the community and educate others. Also, to have it be done regularly. Not simply during a special timeframe.
13	Friday 26 August 2022	Still Me, Still Human	
14	Friday 25 August 2023	Write Your Story	
15	Friday 30 August 2024	Your Passion, Your Pride	
16	Friday 29 August 2025	Bold Voices, Bright Futures	'...in celebration of LGBTQIA+ people openly and visibly achieving their dreams in sport, art, science and more!'. The campaign features artwork by Lee Evatt.
17	Friday 28 August 2026	Colours of Courage	

== See also ==
- LGBTQ
- Spirit Day
- List of LGBTQ awareness periods
