= The Gender Fairy =

2015 picture book by Jo Hirst

- Cover
- Author: Jo Hirst
- Translator: Libby Wirt
- Language: English
- Subject: Gender dysphoria in children
- Published: Balaclava, Victoria
- Publisher: Oban Road Publishing
- Publication date: 2015
- Publication place: Australia
- Media type: Print
- Pages: 35
- ISBN: 9780994457004
- Website: www.thegenderfairy.com

The Gender Fairy is a 2015 picture book written by Jo Hirst and illustrated by Libby Wirt.

== Background and synopsis ==
The Gender Fairy is an Australian book aimed at helping transgender children and their families, inspired by Hirst's experiences as a mother to a transgender child. The book's story is described as "a tale of two children who are taking their first joyful steps toward living as their true selves". The book is aimed as an educational resource for children aged four and up and is designed to be read aloud at home or in the classroom. The book aims to reassure transgender children, saying "only you know whether you are a boy or a girl. No one can tell you."

The book contains notes for teachers and parents compiled by academic Roz Ward. The foreword is written by paediatrician Michelle Telfer of the Centre for Adolescent Health, Gender Service at the Royal Children's Hospital.

== Publishing and reception ==
The book, promoted by the Safe Schools Coalition, was launched at St Kilda Primary School at an event attended by Victorian Minister for Equality Martin Foley who stated that "This book is about affirming trans children’s rights to be who they are, and if that means they’re happy, healthy, and engaged, and that their families are reconciled in support of that, that can only be a good thing."

The book has received widespread support from LGBTQ+ activists and some politicians. In November 2015, Senator Janet Rice, who was married to a transgender woman, praised the book in the Australian Senate.

=== Criticism ===
The book has been the subject of criticism from conservative political figures and organisations. The author estimated in 2018 that since its publication, The Gender Fairy had been mentioned in three different Australian political elections, as well as the Australian Marriage Law Postal Survey. Lyle Shelton of the Australian Christian Lobby described the book's contents as "contested gender theory" in a 2016 criticism of the Safe Schools program. The author has stated that the book is unrelated to the Safe Schools campaign, although it featured on the Safe Schools website.

During the 2016 Australian federal election flyers criticising the education policies of the Australian Labor Party were distributed to voters attacking the book as "gender bending political correctness", which they linked to "Labor's plan for education".

In September 2017 the book featured in a television ad, released in conjunction with the Australian Marriage Law Postal Survey for the "No" campaign. The ad incorporates the words, "Only you know whether you are a boy or a girl". Cory Bernardi, the leader of the Australian Conservatives party, subsequently mentioned The Gender Fairy in a robocall during the postal survey.

== See also ==
- Gayby Baby
