= Australian Marriage Law Postal Survey =

2017 national survey in Australia

- Should the law be changed to allow same-sex couples to marry?

Results
Choice	Votes	%
Yes	7,817,247	61.60%
No	4,873,987	38.40%
Valid votes	12,691,234	99.71%
Invalid or blank votes	36,686	0.29%
Total votes	12,727,920	100.00%
Registered voters/turnout	16,006,180	79.52%
- Results by electorates and states/territories

Australian Marriage Law Postal Survey
- Duration: 12 September – 7 November 2017
- Location: Australia
- Type: Survey
- Budget: $122 million ($80.5 million used)
- Organised by: Australian Bureau of Statistics
- Participants: Adults on the electoral roll
- Outcome: Australian national electorate votes to support same-sex marriage
- Website: abs.gov.au/marriagesurvey

The Australian Marriage Law Postal Survey was a national survey by the Australian Government designed to gauge support for legalising same-sex marriage in Australia. The survey was held via the postal service between 12 September and 7 November 2017.

The results of the survey were published on 15 November 2017. The survey returned 7,817,247 (61.6%) "Yes" responses and 4,873,987 (38.4%) "No" responses. An additional 36,686 (0.3%) responses were unclear. The total turnout was 12,727,920 (79.5% of the eligible population). Responding to the survey was voluntary, unlike voting in elections and referendums which is compulsory in Australia.

A survey form, instructions, and a reply-paid envelope were mailed out by the Australian Bureau of Statistics (ABS) to every person on the federal electoral roll, asking the question "Should the law be changed to allow same-sex couples to marry?" The ABS established processes to ensure eligible Australians who lacked access to post could participate.

Prior to the survey, the Liberal–National Coalition government pledged to facilitate a private member's bill to legalise same-sex marriage in the event of a "Yes" outcome. Had the survey returned a majority "No" result, the government said it would not allow a vote on such a bill in the House of Representatives.

The Marriage Amendment (Definition and Religious Freedoms) Act 2017, which legalised same-sex marriage, was debated and passed by Parliament following publication of the survey results. The Coalition government allowed its parliamentarians a conscience vote on the legislation. The opposition Australian Labor Party supported the legislation, but exceptionally, also granted its parliamentarians a conscience vote.

Many same-sex marriage proponents were critical of the postal survey, viewing it as a costly delaying tactic and an unnecessary hurdle to a conscience vote on same-sex marriage in the parliament. The survey was subject to two legal challenges questioning the authority of the ABS to conduct the survey and the government's power to fund the survey from funds designated by law for "urgent" and "unforeseen" circumstances. Both challenges failed and the High Court of Australia held that the survey was lawful.

== Background ==
=== History ===
Marriage in Australia is the constitutional province of the federal parliament. Its original legal definition was established by common law as "the union of a man and a woman to the exclusion of all others, voluntarily entered into for life." This definition was codified by the Marriage Amendment Act 2004, which inserted it verbatim into the Marriage Act 1961.

At the time of the survey, same-sex unions in Australia were treated as de facto unions under federal law. These unions provide couples with most, though not all, of the legal rights of marriage, although those rights may be difficult to assert and are not always recognised in practice. Aside from the legal aspects, de facto relationships do not have the same symbolic significance as marriage. Before the July 2016 federal election, the Malcolm Turnbull-led Coalition government promised to hold a national vote on same-sex marriage in the form of a compulsory attendance plebiscite. Opposition to this idea centred on its criticism as an expensive delaying tactic and that it was the duty of the parliament, rather than a matter related to the Australian Constitution.

While the Coalition won 76 of the 150 seats in the lower house in the 2016 election and managed to form a majority government by one seat, they failed to pass the necessary legislation for a (compulsory attendance) referendum/plebiscite. The legislation passed the House of Representatives on 20 October 2016 by a vote of 76–67, but was rejected by the Senate on 7 November 2016 by a vote of 33–29. The idea of a postal plebiscite was originally proposed by Liberal MP Warren Entsch and later endorsed by government ministers Peter Dutton and Mathias Cormann. Dutton pointed out that a postal vote would not need legislation to operate. A staffer of Attorney-General George Brandis came up with the idea of a survey as an alternative way to fulfil the government's commitment in mid-July. In August 2017, following an attempt by five Liberal Party MPs to change party policy and have a free vote in the parliament on same-sex marriage legislation, the government announced it would move for a voluntary postal survey to be held later that year. It stated that the postal vote would only occur in the event the government's (compulsory) referendum/plebiscite legislation was again rejected by the Senate. That occurred on 9 August 2017, when a government-initiated motion in the Senate to debate the Plebiscite (Same-Sex Marriage) Bill 2016 was tied at 31–31; resulting in the motion being defeated.

Following the result in the Senate, the government directed the Australian Statistician (head of the Australian Bureau of Statistics) to begin the process of surveying the views on same-sex marriage of all Australians on the electoral roll. The government asserted that this proposal did not require legislative approval from the parliament, arguing that the provisions of the Appropriations Act and the law governing the Australian Bureau of Statistics (ABS) enabled it to use the ABS for such a purpose. This was argued by the government to be similar to the process by which God Save the Queen was replaced by Advance Australia Fair as the Australian national anthem. The government announced the ABS would be assisted by having staff seconded from the Australian Electoral Commission (AEC), the organisation responsible for elections in Australia and managing the electoral roll. The cost of the survey to the Australian taxpayer was forecast to be $122 million, however the total amount spent ended up being $80.5 million. This expense, as well as the notion that the debate would activate ideological extremists and that normal electoral rules would not apply, were criticised in Parliament. By 7 September, the date the high court challenges against the survey were heard, a total of $14.1 million had already been spent by the ABS on the postal survey – $8 million on advertising for the survey, $5.3 million on printing costs, and $600,000 for staff.

The AEC reported that about 68,000 enrolment transactions were completed on 10 August, compared with an average of 4,000 per day. In the period 8–14 August over 16,000 people had enrolled, and over 200,000 had updated their details. By 20 August, over 36,000 had enrolled, and over 434,000 had updated their enrolment details. By 22 August, over 54,000 had enrolled. By 25 August the roll achieved a record high with over 16 million Australians on the roll (an additional 90,000 people had joined with a further 165,000 transactions still to be processed). 65,000 of these new voters are between the ages of 18 and 24. With 933,592 enrolment transactions completed by the AEC at the end of processing, more than 98,000 people were added to the roll, and the total number of Australians eligible to participate in the survey was 16,005,998. However, after the results of the survey were released, the ABS revealed that in fact 16,006,180 surveys were mailed out to eligible Australians.

The Senate Finance and Public Administration References Committee opened a Public Inquiry into the arrangements around the postal survey on 14 August with a submission made and evidence given by the ABS at hearings on 17 August. Further hearings involving the ABS, AEC, Australia Post, Department of Finance and Department of Human Services occurred on 7 September and 15 September 2017. The committee handed down the final report on 13 February 2018. The report recommended that the survey process should not be used again for matters of human rights, encouraged the government to further fund mental health and LGBTIQ organisations to mitigate the impact of the postal survey, and recommended that the Australian Electoral Commission increase its voter registration and education efforts in remote communities and work with Indigenous peak bodies to achieve greater participation.

=== Key dates ===
Key dates relating to the survey were:

- 24 August 2017: The final day for citizens to update or add their name and details to the electoral roll to receive a survey form
- 12 September 2017: Survey forms began to be mailed out to all Australian voters over a two-week period
- 25 September 2017: The date all survey forms were expected to have arrived, and eligible Australians could commence ordering replacement materials (for those lost or spoilt). The paperless options (online form and IVR telephony survey option) opened.
- 20 October 2017 (6 pm local time): Requests for replacement material closed
- 27 October 2017: The date all eligible Australians were strongly encouraged to return their form by
- 7 November 2017 (6 pm local time): Responses received after this date were not processed
- 15 November 2017 (10 am AEDT): Statistics, and quality and integrity report released to the public

The results of the survey (including participation rates) were released at a national level, at a state and territory level and at an electorate level.

== Legal challenges ==
Two legal challenges were lodged contesting the legality of the survey with the High Court of Australia, both on the grounds of unlawful funding from legally-specified funds and unlawful operation by the ABS. The first was by same-sex marriage advocates Shelley Argent (national spokeswoman of Parents and Friends of Lesbians and Gays) and Felicity Marlowe (member of Rainbow Families), along with independent MP Andrew Wilkie. They announced they would challenge the postal survey in the High Court on 9 August 2017 and seek a temporary injunction. The second challenge was by Australian Marriage Equality and Greens Senator Janet Rice.

An additional complaint was lodged by a 17-year-old boy with the Australian Human Rights Commission in August 2017, on the basis that the rules did not allow provisionally enrolled 16- and 17-year-old Australians the right to participate in the survey. The complaint could have led to a federal court case to argue for the right of about 50,000 Australians aged 16 and 17 on the electoral roll to vote, however the boy dropped his complaint on 22 September, after a Greens amendment to the Marriage Law Survey (Additional Safeguards) Act 2017 was rejected by the Parliament earlier in the month. Legal counsel to the boy advised that the rejected amendment would make the age discrimination complaint much more difficult to argue, because parliament had considered and rejected extending the vote to enrolled 16- and 17-year-olds.

=== High Court ruling ===
The High Court pronounced its orders in both cases on 7 September 2017. The court determined that the survey was lawful, allowing it to proceed as scheduled. The challengers were ordered to pay costs. The High Court handed down its unanimous reasons on 28 September 2017, finding that $295 million had been appropriated by parliament, and that whether the expenditure was unforeseen was a matter for the Minister's satisfaction and there was no error of law in either his reasoning or his conclusion. The information to be collected was "statistical information" of matters prescribed in the Census and Statistics Regulation 2016 (Cth). As the court had considered and rejected the grounds of the application, there was no need to decide whether the plaintiffs had standing.

== Survey process ==
The survey was conducted on a voluntary basis, with no requirement on the part of the eligible Australian to mail back the survey form. This led to concerns over a potentially low voter turnout/response rate and the prospect of Indigenous Australians in remote communities being unable to complete a survey. Concern had been expressed regarding: electors whose addresses were not visible on the electoral roll (known as silent electors); disenfranchisement in remote communities; Australians overseas; prisoners; non-English speakers; and young people. Early criticism was also levelled at issues of privacy, with the recent census problems of 2016 being cited. The ABS advised that survey responses would be anonymous and protected under the secrecy provisions of the Census and Statistics Act 1905. Prior to the survey commencing, former Privacy Commissioner Malcolm Crompton independently reviewed the ABS's privacy approaches and mitigations and announced he was suitably satisfied. The ABS also worked to address concerns with special strategies like paperless options (telephony and online form) and form drop off and pick up points in remote and capital city locations. Additionally, the bureau noted that Australians could also authorise a "trusted person" to complete the survey on their behalf. While any person could be appointed a "trusted person", the Chief Minister of the ACT, Andrew Barr offered to fulfil the role for any citizen. Auditors and an external observer process were established to assure the integrity of the process, though the observers are subject to a lifetime confidentiality agreement. A quality and integrity report was published by the ABS alongside the release of the survey results. During the survey period, online sellers were contacted by the ABS asking them to remove ads by people offering to sell their postal survey or answer. The ABS advised that such an action would likely constitute an offence under the Census and Statistics Act 1905, the Commonwealth Criminal Code and the survey safeguards legislation passed by Parliament. The Digital Transformation Agency assisted the ABS with the paperless options for the survey, though due to the compressed timescale of the survey, concerns were anonymously raised by staff that the normal processes were not completed, such as sufficient user testing. AWS was brought in on a tender process to assist in the security measures for the online survey. A telephone information hotline was established, and received 206,828 calls between 14 August 2017 and 7 November 2017.

Unlike elections or referendums, there were no automatic special regulations relating to advertising requirements or prohibited content for the survey of the kind found in the Electoral Act. Consequently, the Government and Opposition engaged in negotiations to introduce legislation designed to replicate these types of regulations, as well as create measures to prevent vilification, intimidation, or threats to cause harm on the basis of the sexual orientation, gender identity, intersex status or the religious convictions of someone during the survey period. On 13 September, the government introduced the Marriage Law Survey (Additional Safeguards) Bill 2017 for these purposes in the Senate. The bill passed the Senate, after an amendment moved by Greens leader Richard Di Natale to allow 16- and 17-year-olds the right to participate in the survey was defeated. The bill immediately proceeded to and was passed by the House of Representatives. The bill received royal assent on 13 September and went into effect the following day. The act's provisions automatically expired on 15 November 2017. Neither the "Yes" or "No" campaign received public funding in the survey, as was envisioned for a compulsory attendance plebiscite. Prime Minister Turnbull also ruled out a ban on foreign donations for the survey.

All Australians whose names are on the electoral roll or had applied to be put on the roll before 24 August 2017 were mailed a survey form and enrolled Australians living overseas along with those in certain special categories were entitled to complete a survey using paperless methods. The AEC made a statement that provisionally-enrolled 16- and 17-year-olds would not be posted a survey form and an amended direction was later issued by the Government to the Australian Statistician making this clear. This direction was subject to a Human Rights Commission complaint by a 17-year-old boy, which was later withdrawn.

More than 16 million letters were sent from 12 September over almost two weeks (with all delivered by 25 September) and silent electors' packages were sent by the AEC and delivered by the end of September. After several "Yes" respondents posted images of their complete forms on social media, the ABS cautioned participants to not photograph their form barcodes, so as to prevent any fraudulent conduct. Additionally, survey forms could be invalidated in the event the question was rephrased by the participant or the barcode was obscured or removed. The ABS issued several examples of what constituted a valid and invalid response (such as marking both boxes "Yes" and "No" or crossing out one of the words on the form). The ABS advised Australians who received extra survey forms, addressed to the previous occupant who failed to update their electoral details, to write on the front of the envelope "return to sender" and send it back. In Australia, it is illegal to open mail addressed to another person. In the rare instance of multiple responses being received from an individual, the ABS noted that only the last valid response could expect to be counted. On 25 September, the ABS confirmed that all survey forms had been mailed to eligible voters and outlined the process for additional forms to be sent to people who did not receive, lost or spoilt their form. The ABS also confirmed that a change of mind was not a valid reason for requesting a new form. Both the "Yes" and "No" campaigns provided 60 observers to the ABS counting process, who examined 606,991 survey results. Fewer than 500 survey forms were reported as issues to the ABS during the survey.

=== Weekly estimate of responses ===
On 28 September, the ABS announced that it would release weekly national estimates of the total number of survey responses received, beginning from 3 October 2017 and ending 7 November. The primary input to the first three weekly estimates, issued at the National level only, was Australia Post's assessment of the number of containers of sorted envelopes rather than counts of individual forms. Adjustments were made based on factors such as responses received through other channels and an allowance for forms that are damaged or invalid. From the fourth estimate, released on 24 October 2017, the ABS changed the estimation method to use the counts of processed forms. This led to an increase in estimated turnout to 74.5% of the population, up 7.0% on the previous week, despite only 300,000 new responses, or 1.9% of the total, being received during that timeframe.

Week	Estimated responses	Estimated rate of response
3 October	9,200,000	57.5%
10 October	10,000,000	62.5%
17 October	10,800,000	67.5%
24 October	11,900,000	74.5%
31 October	12,300,000	77.0%
7 November	12,600,000	78.5%

== Question ==
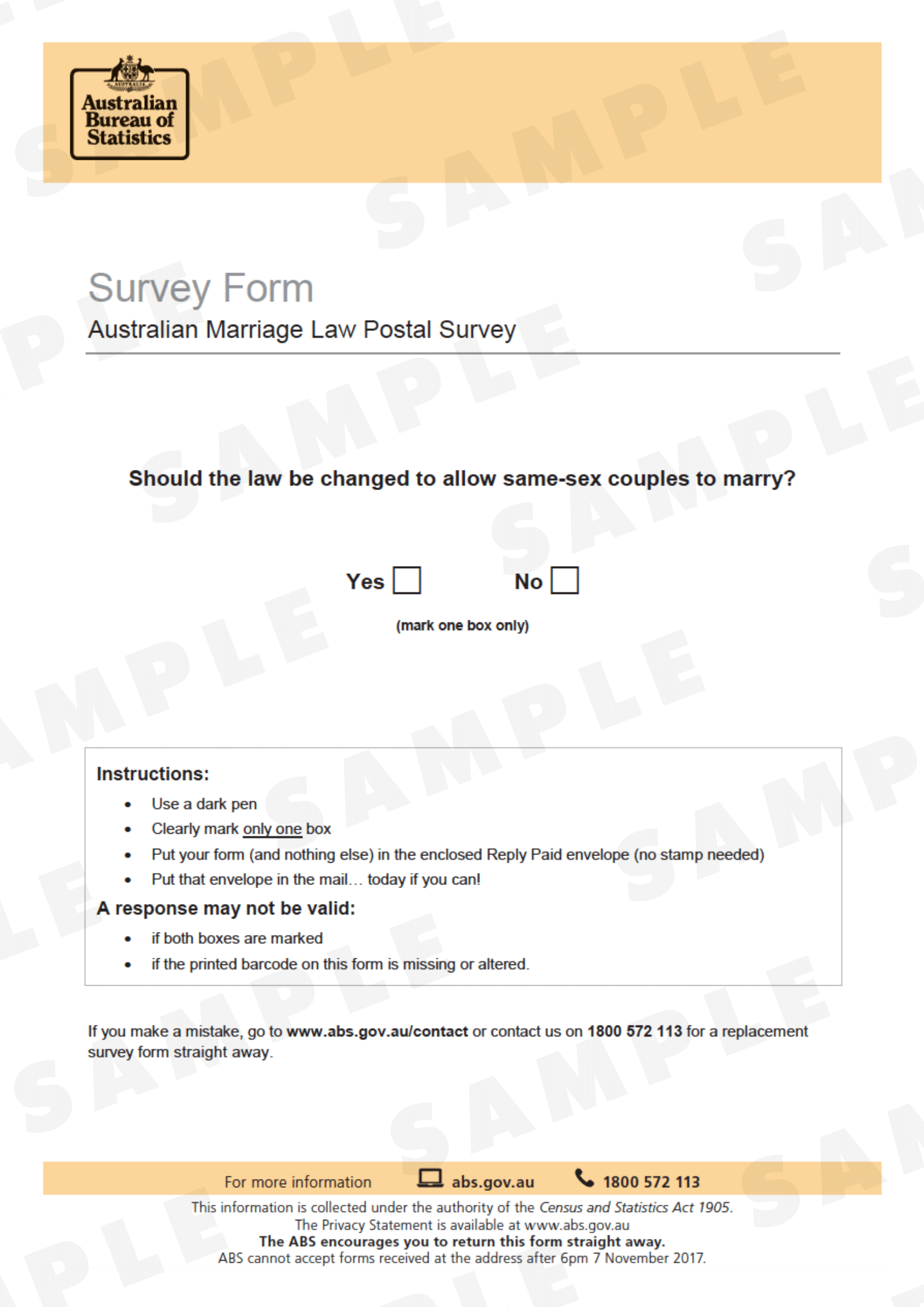
Sample image of the survey form

The survey form asked respondents: "Should the law be changed to allow same-sex couples to marry?". The survey offered two one-word responses: "yes" or "no".

== Legislation proposed ==
The government did not release a draft bill legalising same-sex marriage prior to the survey, which led to uncertainty over what form legislation would take in the event of a "Yes" verdict. The wording of an exposure draft of a same-sex marriage bill from early 2017, released by the Attorney-General's office, proposed to amend the definition of "marriage" and replace the terms "man" and "woman" with the gender neutral phrase "two people". The proposed wording "two people" differed from the wording of the survey question, which referred explicitly to "same-sex couples".

Liberal senator Dean Smith, who drafted a same-sex marriage bill in August 2017, argued his bill struck a "fair balance" in protecting the rights of same-sex couples and the religious freedoms of celebrants. The bill allows current civil celebrants to become religious celebrants and refuse to perform same sex marriages, and incorporates parts of the Sex Discrimination Act, to allow religious organisations to refuse their services for same-sex marriages. Smith's bill was formally backed by the Labor Party parliamentary caucus on 17 October 2017. However, conservative MPs in the government responded by suggesting up to 100 amendments to the bill may be needed if the "Yes" vote carried.

A rival bill was released on 13 November by Liberal Senator James Paterson, a conservative supporter of same-sex marriage. The bill contained various protections allowing the refusal of same-sex weddings by anyone who holds a religious or "conscientious belief" against same-sex marriage, including private service providers such as florists and bakers. Prime Minister Turnbull reacted negatively to Paterson's bill, saying the government "would not countenance" supporting a bill which discriminated against same-sex weddings and that the bill would have "virtually no prospect of getting through the Parliament". It was dropped by Senator Paterson within hours of the "Yes" vote being released.

== Support and opposition ==
=== Party positions in a parliamentary vote ===
Each of the political parties represented in the Australian Parliament held formalised positions on same-sex marriage and on the merits of the survey. The Australian Labor Party formally supported the legalisation of same-sex marriage, though offered its MPs a conscience vote on same-sex marriage legislation until 2019. The Liberal Party pledged to hold a national vote of some kind before any change to the law, though the party had no official position on the survey question, hence MPs (including Cabinet members) were to free to campaign for either side. All politicians were entitled to use their electoral printing and communications budgets in the campaign.

Position	Political parties	Ref
Yes	Labor*	
Yes	Greens	
Yes	Xenophon Team	
Yes	Liberal Democrats	
Yes	Hinch's Justice	
No	National	
No	Conservatives	
No	Katter's Australia	
Subject to public vote	Liberal	
Subject to public vote	One Nation*	
Subject to public vote	Lambie Network	
*Conscience vote allowed for MPs.

=== "Yes" campaign ===
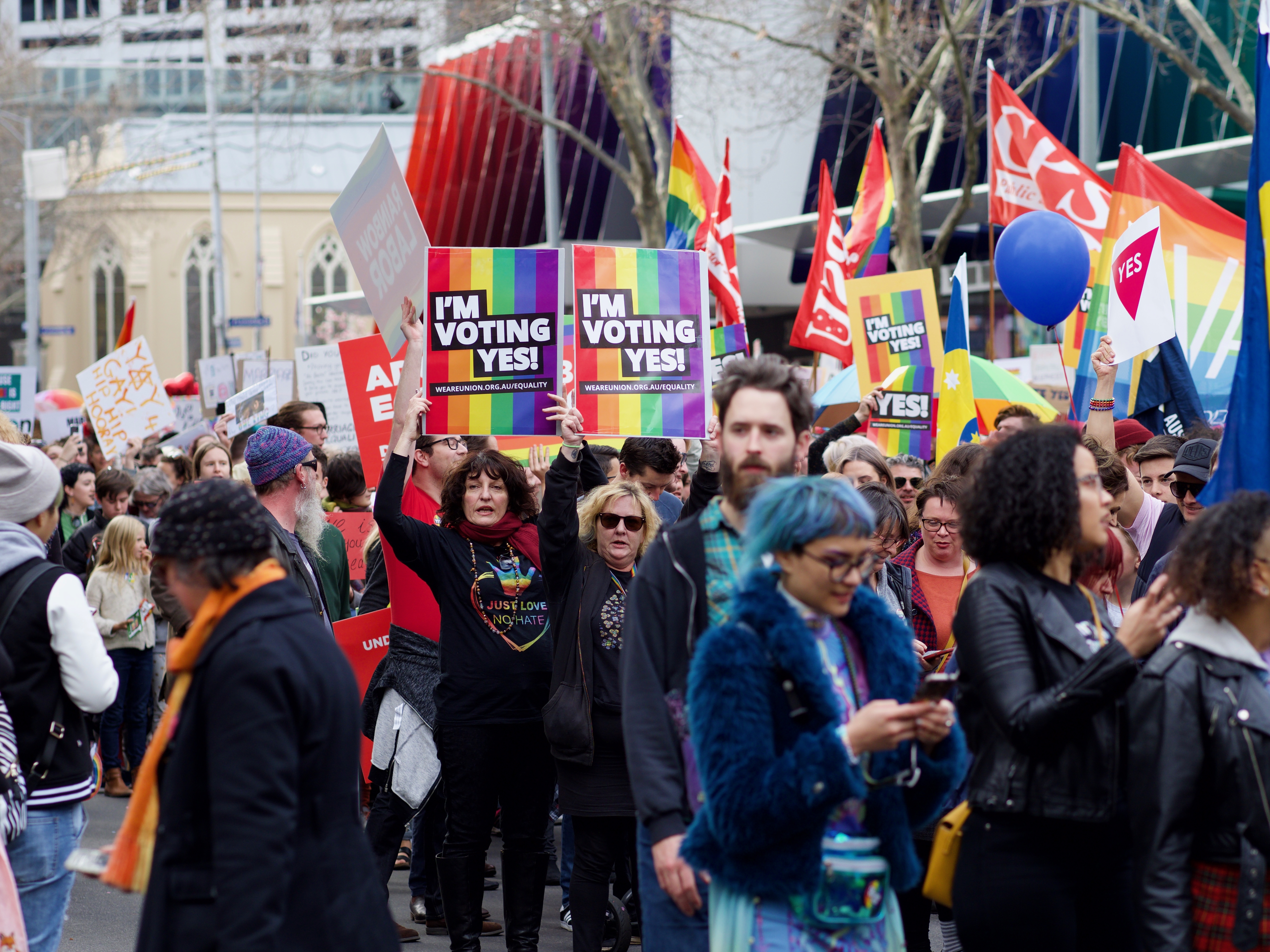
A "Yes" campaign rally in Melbourne in August 2017.

The campaign for supporting voting in favour of same-sex marriage in the survey received support from Labor, the Liberals for yes campaign, and four minor political parties represented in the Federal parliament, and from prominent lobby groups including Australian Marriage Equality and GetUp!.

=== "No" campaign ===
The campaign advocating voting against changing the marriage laws in the survey was supported by the Nationals and three minor parties represented in the Federal parliament. Several groups opposed to same-sex marriage, including the Australian Christian Lobby and the Marriage Alliance, formed the Coalition for Marriage to co-ordinate the "No" campaign.

=== Neutral ===
The Liberal Party of Australia did not hold a position either way in the survey.

== Public opinion ==
Opinion polls in Australia over several years in the lead-up to the survey indicated a comfortable majority of Australians supported same-sex marriage. A Guardian Essential poll conducted just prior to the announcement of the postal survey indicated that 43% approved of a postal vote and 38% disapproved, whereas a week later, 39% approved of the postal survey and 47% disapproved of it. A small boycott movement existed, although most same sex marriage campaigners who were against a national vote on same-sex marriage urged participation in the postal survey. Some informal responses to the survey were intended as a protest vote.

=== Voting intentions ===
Date	Firm	Yes	No	Undecided	Sample size	Notes
9–12 November 2017	Newspoll	63%	37%	–	1,625	(Note: Among respondents who voted already.)
3–6 November 2017	Essential	64%	31%	5%	1,792	
26–30 October 2017	Galaxy Research	66%	34%	—N/a	1,000	
26–29 October 2017	EMRS	64%	28%	—N/a	1,000	
26–29 October 2017	Newspoll	62%	35%	3%	1,623	
26–29 October 2017	Newspoll	59%	35%	6%	1,623	(Note: Among all respondents, whether they had voted already or not.)
12–22 October 2017	Essential	60%	34%	5%	1,859	
12–22 October 2017	Essential	39%	33%	28%	1,859	(Note: Among respondents who have not yet voted.)
12–16 October 2017	YouGov	61%	35%	3%	1,067	
12–16 October 2017	YouGov	54%	28%	18%	1,067	
12–15 October 2017	Newspoll	56%	37%	7%	1,583	
6–8 October 2017	Roy Morgan Research	61.5%	17.5%	—N/a	1,554	(Note: 21% of respondents refused to answer the question or declared no intention to vote.)
2 October 2017	ReachTEL	70.3%	21.1%	—N/a	4,888	(Note: The Yes figure is a combination of people who say they have already voted yes (64.3%) and people who say they still intend to vote yes (6%). The No figure is a combination of people who say they have already voted no (15.5%) and people who say they still intend to vote no (5.7%). An additional 5.7% say that they do not intend to vote and 2.8% say they have not received a survey form.)
28 September – 1 October 2017	Essential	64%	30%	6%	1,841	
28 September – 1 October 2017	Essential	50%	36%	14%	1,841	
22–25 September 2017	Essential	58%	33%	9%	1,803	
21–24 September 2017	Newspoll	57%	34%	9%	1,695	
15–18 September 2017	Essential	55%	34%	11%	1,808	
14–18 September 2017	YouGov	59%	33%	9%	1,056	
6–9 September 2017	Ipsos	70%	—N/a	—N/a	1,400	
28 August – 6 September 2017	Newgate Research	58.4%	31.4%	10.2%	800	
1–4 September 2017	Essential	59%	31%	11%	1,784	
17–22 August 2017	Essential	57%	32%	11%	1,817	
17–21 August 2017	YouGov	59%	33%	8%	1,012	
17–20 August 2017	Newspoll	63%	30%	7%	1,675	

=== Likelihood of voting in the survey ===
Date	Firm	Voted already	Definitely will	Probably will	Probably won't	Definitely won't	Undecided	Sample size	Notes
9–12 November 2017	Newspoll	79%	—N/a	—N/a	—N/a	—N/a	—N/a	1,625	(Note: 17% of respondents said they had not voted and 4% were "uncommitted")
3–6 November 2017	Essential	86%	—N/a	—N/a	—N/a	—N/a	—N/a	1,792	(Note: 14% of respondents said they had not voted.)
26–29 October 2017	Newspoll	76%	10%	5%	2%	2%	3%	1,623	
12–22 October 2017	Essential	75%	8%	4%	3%	3%	4%	1,859	
12–16 October 2017	YouGov	67%	13%	7%	3%	6%	5%	1,067	
12–15 October 2017	Newspoll	65%	19%	6%	2%	3%	5%	1,583	
2 October 2017	ReachTEL	79%	—N/a	—N/a	—N/a	—N/a	—N/a	4,888	
2 October 2017	Newgate Research	77%	—N/a	—N/a	—N/a	—N/a	—N/a	—N/a	
28 September – 1 October 2017	Essential	47%	33%	6%	3%	3%	5%	1,841	
22–25 September 2017	Essential	36%	45%	8%	1%	2%	5%	1,803	
21–24 September 2017	Newspoll	15%	67%	7%	2%	2%	7%	1,695	(Note: The undecided number included 5% who say they "may or may not" participate and 2% who are "uncommitted".)
15–18 September 2017	Essential	9%	62%	12%	2%	3%	8%	1,808	
6–9 September 2017	Ipsos	–	65%	—N/a	—N/a	—N/a	—N/a	1,400	
1–4 September 2017	Essential	–	62%	16%	4%	3%	10%	1,784	
23 August 2017	ReachTEL	–	78.7%	10%	4.1%	7.2%	–	2,382	(Note: The poll asked respondents if they were "very likely, somewhat likely, somewhat unlikely or very unlikely" to participate in the survey, and did not give an option of being undecided.)
17–22 August 2017	Essential	–	63%	18%	4%	6%	9%	1,817	
17–21 August 2017	YouGov	–	56%	17%	—N/a	—N/a	—N/a	1,012	
17–20 August 2017	Newspoll	–	67%	15%	4%	3%	11%	1,675	(Note: The undecided number included 9% who say they "may or may not" participate and 3% who are "uncommitted".)

== Activities during the campaign ==
=== Advocacy by territory and local governments ===
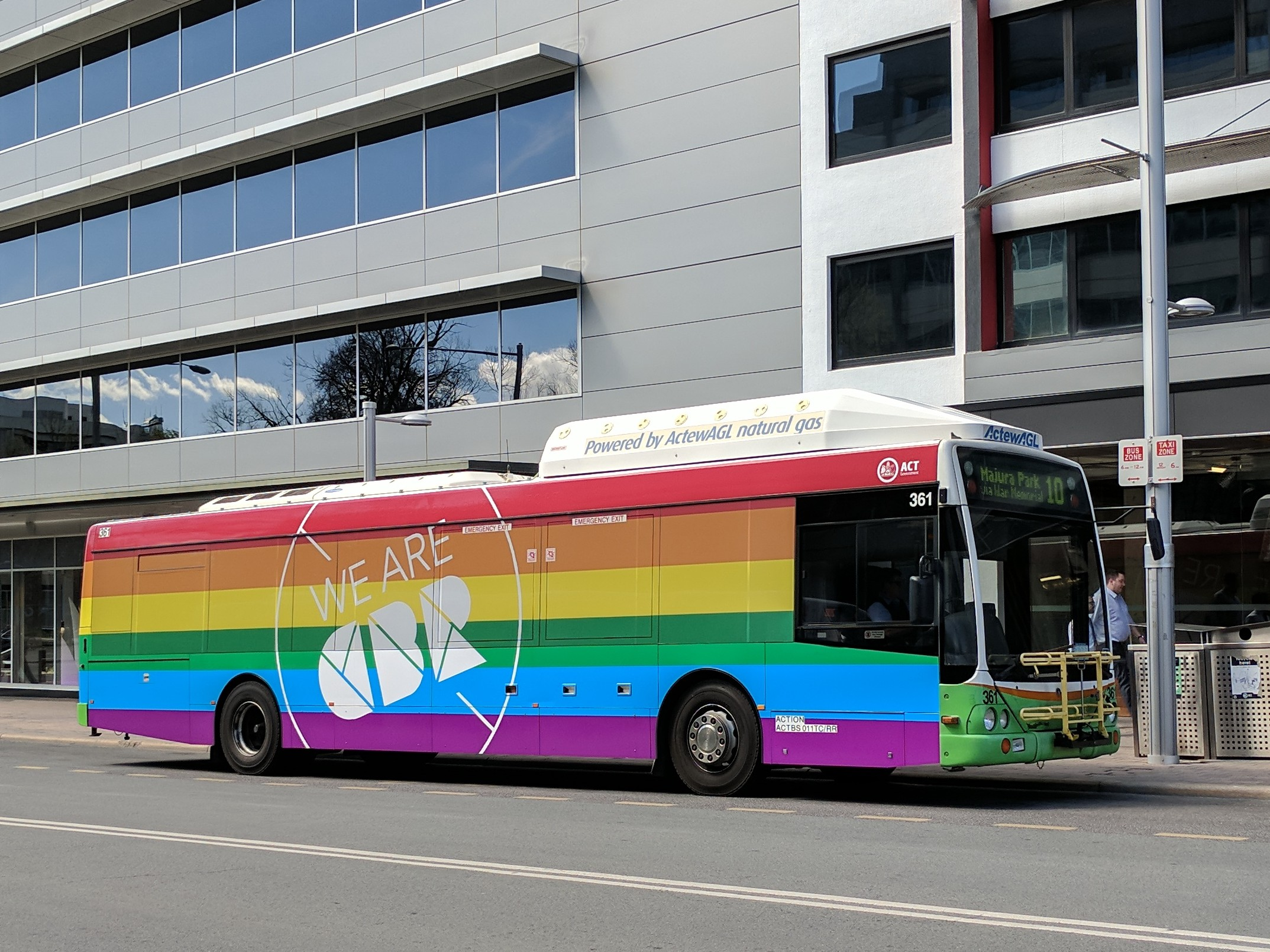
A Canberra bus with rainbow wrap advertising as support from the ACT Government for the city's LGBTIQ community during the survey period.

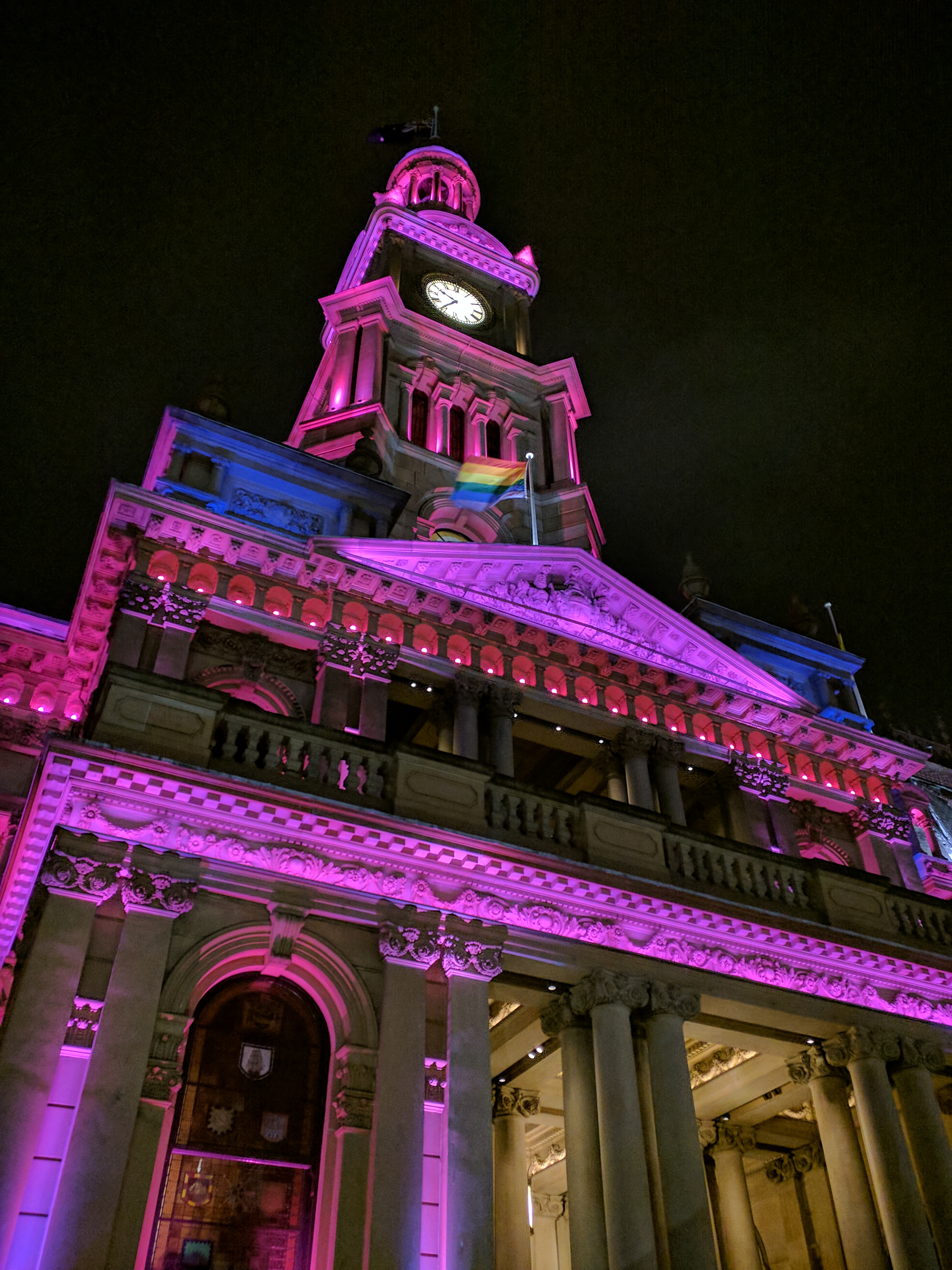
Sydney Town Hall illuminated in pride colours and flying a rainbow flag in support of the "Yes" vote.

The Government of the Australian Capital Territory and several local governments such as the City of Sydney took official positions supporting the "Yes" campaign. Public servants in the ACT were warned against campaigning in the survey while in official uniform. The move to offer official support was criticised by the Liberal Party opposition in the ACT, and similar criticisms lead to the City of Darebin backing down on plans to restrict "No" campaigners from using council facilities.

=== Debate over freedom of religion ===
Several figures and institutions supporting a "No" vote raised the issue of religious freedom during the survey period. Former Prime Minister John Howard rejected the assurances of Prime Minister Malcolm Turnbull and requested that the government explicitly detail proposed religious freedom provisions to potentially be included in same-sex marriage legislation. Likewise several leaders in the Catholic Church raised freedom of religion concerns, citing the case of a Tasmanian archbishop, who was requested to appear at an anti-discrimination commission after having disseminated material supporting a conservative view of marriage. The veracity of the concerns over religious freedom was disputed heavily in the community. Some groups, such as the National Catholic Education Commission said they were unsure if Christian schools could continue to teach the conservative view of marriage in the event same-sex marriage was legalised, however academics Marion Maddox and Carol Johnson challenged this by arguing that religious organisations would continue to be able to access exemptions from anti-discrimination laws and, consequently, remain free to refuse same-sex marriage if it is eventually introduced. The divisions extended to the governing Liberal Party, whose president rejected claims that religious freedom could be under threat, in direct contradiction to the party's vice-president, who said that same-sex marriage would have consequences for freedom of speech, religion and association.

Both Prime Minister Turnbull and Bill Shorten, leader of the Opposition, spoke in favour of religious freedom protections, with Turnbull stating he was an even "stronger believer" in freedom of religion than same-sex marriage. Shorten said the Labor Party would "make sure that concerns about religious freedom are met with and dealt with and are treated with respect". The prospect of additional religious freedom exemptions being added to existing Australian anti-discrimination law troubled some "Yes" advocates, who feared such provisions could allow service providers to discriminate on any basis, not just limited to couples' sex. Tiernan Brady described the campaign for religious freedom exemptions as "a blatant attempt to unravel existing anti-discrimination laws which serve everyone in Australia well, not just LGBTI people".

In response to a Newspoll question on the subject; "Do you think parliament should provide guarantees in law for freedom of conscience, belief and religion if it legislates for same-sex marriage?", 62% responded Yes, 18% responded No and 20% said they were "uncommitted". A poll conducted by Galaxy later in the survey found 78% of respondents said Yes in response to the question; "If the majority vote 'yes' in the postal survey, should same-sex couples be treated the same under the law compared with other couples?"

An inquiry into religious freedoms, headed by Philip Ruddock, was announced in November 2017. This has been interpreted as a way to allow the speedy passage of the Dean Smith bill and postpone discussions of religious freedom. It completed a report on 18 May 2018, which was not publicly released until 13 December 2018, although the recommendations were leaked to Fairfax Media in October 2018. The government responded by proposing a religious discrimination act.

=== Advertising and media ===
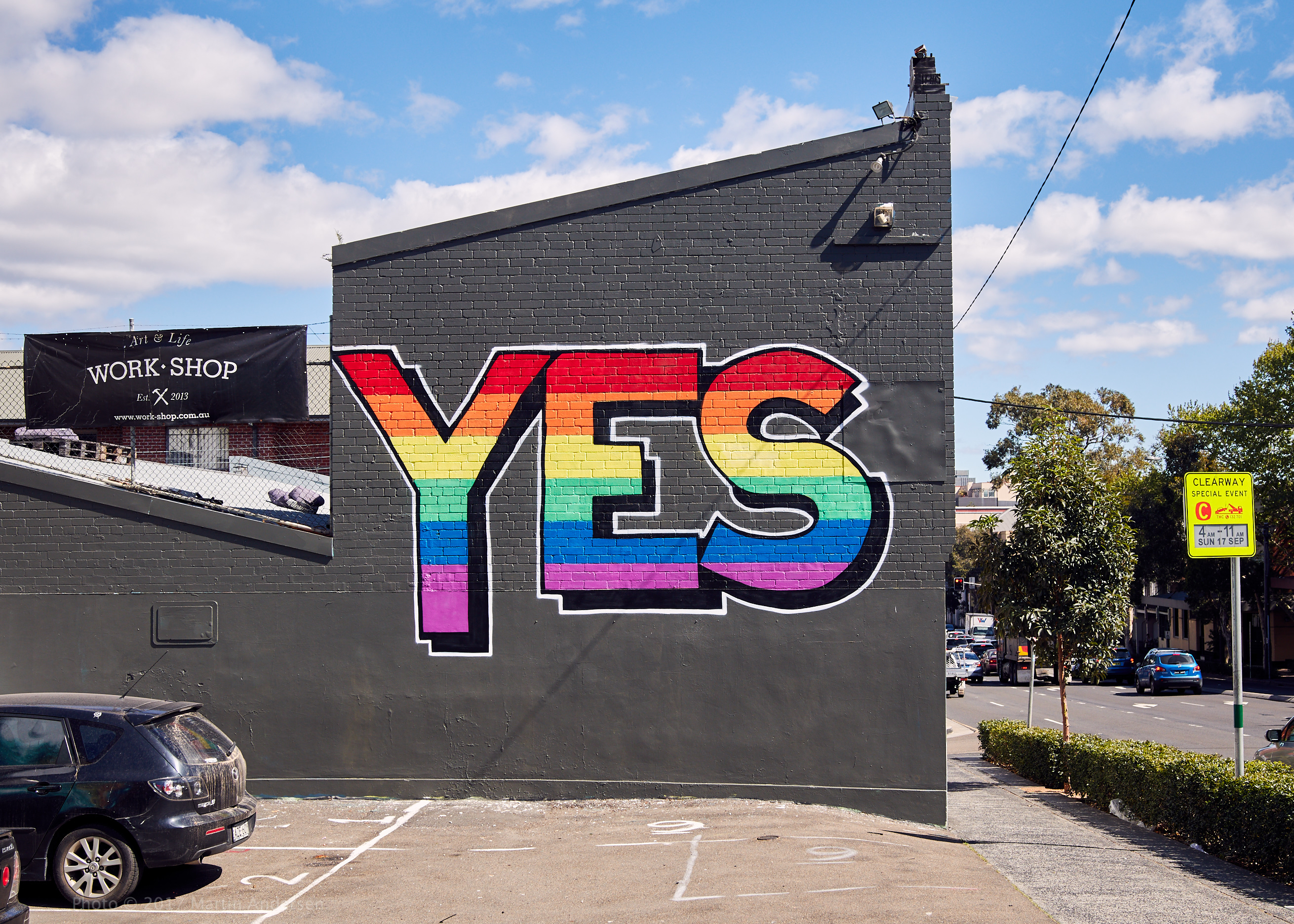
A shop wall in Redfern, New South Wales, with the signage "Yes" painted in the colours of the LGBT flag, designed to demonstrate the support for the survey.

Advertising by both sides was extensive for much of the survey period. The first television ad for the "No" campaign, revealed shortly after the campaign began, featured three women and focused on the Safe Schools education program. The "Yes" campaign promptly aired a rebuttal by Dr. Kerryn Phelps. A "No" supporter funded the skywritten message "Vote No" over Sydney in September, which was defended by Turnbull as an expression of free speech. In Melbourne, a giant "NO" was written in the sky in response to the survey.

Subsequent "Yes" ads focused heavily on a concerted "get out the vote" effort, and featured high-profile figures such as Ian Thorpe and others posting their surveys, as well as a themed ad screened during the finale of popular television show The Bachelor. The "Yes" campaign were also responsible for a widespread SMS message to many Australian mobile phones which lead to some complaints over how people's numbers were obtained, however the campaign advised the numbers were generated through random dialling technology previously used in elections.

Both of the "No" campaign's next most prominent advertisements concentrated on the "radical gender ideas" in school curriculum, one such ad focusing on the book The Gender Fairy while featuring two of the mothers from the original advertisement. The other advertisement included archive footage of one of the founders of the Safe Schools program and included material alleged to have been available for viewing by year seven students which was subsequently deemed inappropriate for unrestricted viewing by the Australian Commercial Television Code of Practice. As of mid-September, prominent "No" campaigner Lyle Shelton was mentioned across news outlets more times than the leading three "Yes" campaigners, Alex Greenwich, Tiernan Brady and Sally Rugg, combined.

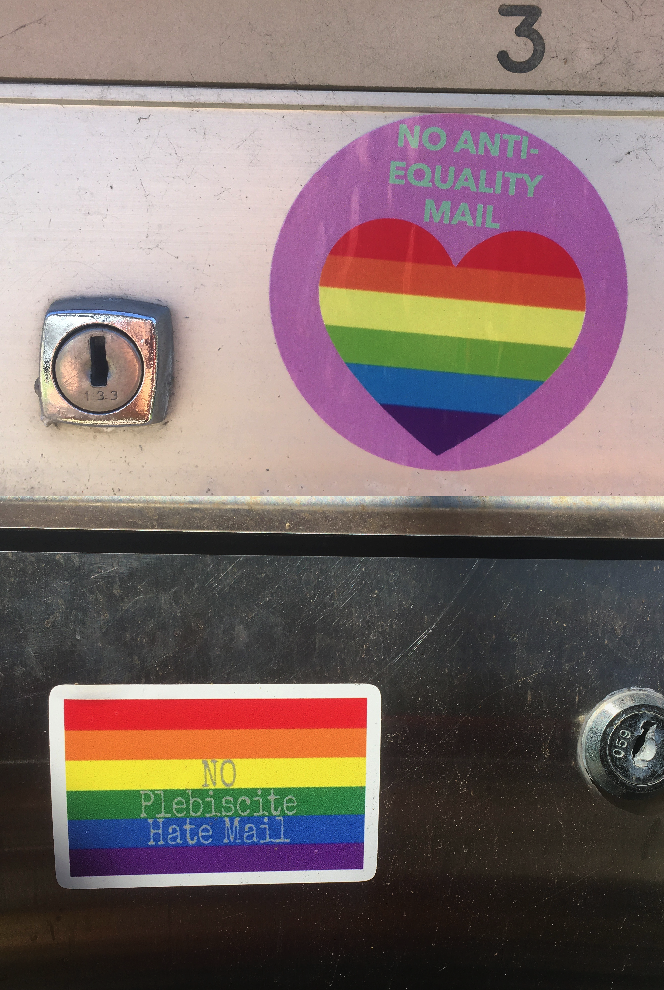
Rainbow flag-patterned stickers on mail boxes asking for no anti-equality or hate mail. Similar stickers were promoted as a way to show support for same-sex marriage and reduce the amount of unwanted materials received.

Legislation in effect for the duration of the survey made it illegal to vilify, intimidate, threaten or harm "on the basis of sexual orientation, gender identity, intersex status or religion", with a fine of up to $12,600 for breaches. Furthermore, all campaign material was required to be properly authorised. By 26 September, marketing services group Ebiquity estimated that the lead "No" group (Coalition for Marriage) had spent about $3,975,872 on advertising, a figure higher than their estimate for the two lead "Yes" groups (Australian Marriage Equality and the Equality Campaign), about $2,920,740. Two donations of note were made in the course of the survey; $1 million was personally donated by Qantas CEO Alan Joyce to the "Yes" campaign, and $1 million was donated by the Anglican Diocese of Sydney to the "No" campaign. Former Prime Minister Tony Abbott said in November that the "No" campaign had 20,000 donors who donated around $6 million to the campaign.

At the 2017 NRL Grand Final, American rapper Macklemore was booked to perform several songs, including "Same Love". The song topped the Australian charts in 2013, and was regarded as an anthem for same-sex marriage advocates during the campaign in Macklemore's home state of Washington. In the days leading up to the grand final, the single returned to the top of the Australian iTunes charts. Several prominent conservative politicians voiced strong opposition to the scheduled performance of "Same Love", given its high-profile support for the "Yes" campaign during the voting period of the Australian Marriage Law Postal Survey. Macklemore acknowledged the controversy several days before the final, but vowed to "go harder" as a result.

A nationwide study of lesbian, gay, and bisexual mental health found that increased exposure to negative, anti-LGBT media messages during the postal survey was related to increased levels of depressions, anxiety, and stress.

=== Discussion of impact on children ===
The rights and welfare of children, particularly as it related to same-sex parenting, was occasionally discussed publicly through the survey. Organisations such as the Australian Catholic Bishops' Conference, the Presbyterian Church of Australia and the Australian National Imams Council all advocated strongly for nuclear family structures during the survey. A fact check article published in The Conversation, which was based on a review of the literature on outcomes for children of same-sex parents, showed equal or better outcomes for children raised by parents of the same gender. Likewise, a review published late in the survey period by the Medical Journal of Australia agreed with The Conversation's findings, but noted that the effects of being exposed to stigma and discrimination could lead to poorer public health outcomes for the children in same-sex parented families.

=== Counselling for those impacted and mental health ===
A number of helplines, counselling services and mental health strategies were made available to LGBTIQ people by several organisations, including the Australian Broadcasting Corporation. Similar services were available for Defence, Victorian local councils and health services such as Alfred Health. State governments in Western Australia, Victoria and Queensland all allocated additional funds, ranging from $60,000 to $500,000, to LGBTIQ mental health services.

Other groups, such as Slater and Gordon, the Australian Psychological Society and Minus 18 unveiled material and mechanisms designed to offer support and relief for those affected by the debate, such as parents of young children and LGBTIQ teenagers who experienced difficulties dealing with the public discussion.

The survey period was associated with increases in the number of LGBTIQ people requesting assistance for mental health issues. ReachOut Australia, which lead the pro-same-sex marriage campaign by five mental health services, reported increases (variously at) 20, 30 and 40 per cent in clients during the survey period and crisis support service Lifeline noted a spike in calls about the impact of the survey. Mental health surveys conducted during this period showed that increased exposure to the 'no' campaign was related to increased levels of depression, anxiety, and stress among same-sex attracted Australians. Shorten wrote to Turnbull about increasing the funding for mental health services during the survey from the federal budget, but did not receive a response.

=== Vandalism and abuse ===
The survey was accompanied by a variety of acts of vandalism and abuse by both parties. In September, a banner reading "Burn Churches, Not Queers" was unfurled at a Coalition for Marriage meeting, and in October several churches in Victoria and New South Wales were graffitied with messages criticising "No" voters. Similarly, a passenger train on the Sydney Trains network was vandalised with messages encouraging "No" votes, including foul language and the Nazi swastika. The ABC created a digital news service designed to track incidents of violence and abuse throughout the survey, with both "Yes" and "No" voters/organisations being targeted on occasions.

== Results ==
=== National result ===
Choice	Votes	%
For	7,817,247	61.60
Against	4,873,987	38.40
Total	12,691,234	100.00
Valid votes	12,691,234	99.71
Invalid/blank votes	36,686	0.29
Total votes	12,727,920	100.00
Registered voters/turnout	16,006,180	79.52

National survey results (excluding invalid votes)
Yes; 7,817,247 (61.6%)	No; 4,873,987 (38.4%)
▲50%

=== State and territory breakdown ===
The Australian Capital Territory recorded the strongest "Yes" vote at 74% while New South Wales had the lowest level of support at 57.8%. All other jurisdictions had above 60% support, with Victoria the leading state on 64.9% support.

Breakdown of responses by state and territory
State/Territory	Yes		No		Unclear	Participation rate (%)
State/Territory	Votes	%	Votes	%	Unclear	Participation rate (%)
New South Wales	2,374,362	57.8	1,736,838	42.2	11,036	79.5
Victoria	2,145,629	64.9	1,161,098	35.1	11,028	81.7
Queensland	1,487,060	60.7	961,015	39.3	7,088	77.9
Western Australia	801,575	63.7	455,924	36.3	3,188	78.4
South Australia	592,528	62.5	356,247	37.5	2,778	79.7
Tasmania	191,948	63.6	109,655	36.4	805	79.7
Australian Capital Territory	175,459	74.0	61,520	26.0	534	82.5
Northern Territory	48,686	60.6	31,690	39.4	229	58.4
Total for country	7,817,247	61.6	4,873,987	38.4	36,686	79.5

=== Electorate breakdown ===
Breakdown of voting by electorate
Electorate	Yes (%)	Yes votes	No (%)	No votes	Formal total	Participation rate (%)	State/territory	Party (Note: The political party of the electorate's member at the time.)
Adelaide	70.10%	62,769	29.90%	26,771	89,540	81.42%	South Australia	Labor
Aston	61.97%	48,455	38.03%	29,730	78,185	81.62%	Victoria	Liberal
Ballarat	70.54%	65,613	29.46%	27,405	93,018	81.69%	Victoria	Labor
Banks	44.88%	37,736	55.12%	46,343	84,079	80.12%	New South Wales	Liberal
Barker	52.26%	42,498	47.74%	38,827	81,325	77.05%	South Australia	Liberal
Barton	43.64%	37,153	56.36%	47,984	85,137	78.05%	New South Wales	Labor
Bass	61.69%	36,249	38.31%	22,510	58,759	79.18%	Tasmania	Labor
Batman	71.16%	66,383	28.84%	26,906	93,289	83.94%	Victoria	Labor
Bendigo	68.73%	63,412	31.27%	28,852	92,264	82.71%	Victoria	Labor
Bennelong	49.84%	42,943	50.16%	43,215	86,158	81.22%	New South Wales	Liberal
Berowra	54.56%	48,471	45.44%	40,369	88,840	84.74%	New South Wales	Liberal
Blair	60.02%	47,194	39.98%	31,433	78,627	76.69%	Queensland	Labor
Blaxland	26.05%	20,406	73.95%	57,926	78,332	75.22%	New South Wales	Labor
Bonner	62.05%	52,139	37.95%	31,891	84,030	82.41%	Queensland	Liberal National
Boothby	68.51%	62,139	31.49%	28,556	90,695	84.31%	South Australia	Liberal
Bowman	62.13%	53,529	37.87%	32,627	86,156	81.44%	Queensland	Liberal National
Braddon	54.03%	30,054	45.97%	25,573	55,627	75.98%	Tasmania	Labor
Bradfield	60.58%	53,681	39.42%	34,927	88,608	83.73%	New South Wales	Liberal
Brand	67.09%	51,953	32.91%	25,481	77,434	76.04%	Western Australia	Labor
Brisbane	79.51%	72,812	20.49%	18,762	91,574	81.62%	Queensland	Liberal National
Bruce	46.91%	34,644	53.09%	39,203	73,847	77.71%	Victoria	Labor
Burt	56.97%	44,058	43.03%	33,275	77,333	76.21%	Western Australia	Labor
Calare	60.19%	54,091	39.81%	35,779	89,870	78.06%	New South Wales	National
Calwell	43.16%	37,839	56.84%	49,823	87,662	78.86%	Victoria	Labor
Canberra	74.07%	89,590	25.93%	31,361	120,951	83.25%	Australian Capital Territory	Labor
Canning	60.23%	48,486	39.77%	32,019	80,505	78.46%	Western Australia	Liberal
Capricornia	54.06%	39,917	45.94%	33,917	73,834	74.84%	Queensland	Liberal National
Casey	68.06%	59,959	31.94%	28,144	88,103	84.03%	Victoria	Liberal
Chifley	41.31%	32,871	58.69%	46,702	79,573	73.91%	New South Wales	Labor
Chisholm	61.59%	49,448	38.41%	30,844	80,292	82.42%	Victoria	Liberal
Cook	55.04%	47,505	44.96%	38,804	86,309	82.22%	New South Wales	Liberal
Corangamite	71.56%	69,723	28.44%	27,708	97,431	85.09%	Victoria	Liberal
Corio	67.72%	62,658	32.28%	29,865	92,523	83.57%	Victoria	Labor
Cowan	58.82%	44,388	41.18%	31,075	75,463	78.01%	Western Australia	Labor
Cowper	60.01%	57,493	39.99%	38,317	95,810	79.23%	New South Wales	National
Cunningham	65.67%	60,906	34.33%	31,840	92,746	81.86%	New South Wales	Labor
Curtin	72.22%	59,638	27.78%	22,943	82,581	84.05%	Western Australia	Liberal
Dawson	55.15%	42,539	44.85%	34,599	77,138	74.16%	Queensland	Liberal National
Deakin	65.69%	55,464	34.31%	28,973	84,437	84.63%	Victoria	Liberal
Denison	73.78%	45,005	26.22%	15,992	60,997	82.37%	Tasmania	Independent
Dickson	65.16%	54,206	34.84%	28,988	83,194	81.82%	Queensland	Liberal National
Dobell	65.75%	59,475	34.25%	30,987	90,462	78.89%	New South Wales	Labor
Dunkley	71.97%	62,840	28.03%	24,471	87,311	81.93%	Victoria	Liberal
Durack	59.16%	39,304	40.84%	27,128	66,432	67.95%	Western Australia	Liberal
Eden-Monaro	64.92%	57,223	35.08%	30,926	88,149	79.97%	New South Wales	Labor
Fadden	61.81%	52,154	38.19%	32,218	84,372	76.33%	Queensland	Liberal National
Fairfax	64.32%	58,510	35.68%	32,451	90,961	81.05%	Queensland	Liberal National
Farrer	55.21%	48,432	44.79%	39,297	87,729	77.42%	New South Wales	Liberal
Fenner	74.01%	85,869	25.99%	30,159	116,028	81.61%	Australian Capital Territory	Labor
Fisher	62.83%	52,023	37.17%	30,783	82,806	80.89%	Queensland	Liberal National
Flinders	69.99%	68,291	30.01%	29,275	97,566	82.06%	Victoria	Liberal
Flynn	51.48%	39,020	48.52%	36,783	75,803	75.62%	Queensland	Liberal National
Forde	60.55%	46,937	39.45%	30,585	77,522	76.10%	Queensland	Liberal National
Forrest	63.80%	51,612	36.20%	29,285	80,897	78.86%	Western Australia	Liberal
Fowler	36.34%	27,847	63.66%	48,782	76,629	72.43%	New South Wales	Labor
Franklin	68.77%	44,746	31.23%	20,322	65,068	82.74%	Tasmania	Labor
Fremantle	70.09%	57,541	29.91%	24,559	82,100	80.55%	Western Australia	Labor
Gellibrand	68.10%	62,045	31.90%	29,065	91,110	82.21%	Victoria	Labor
Gilmore	61.98%	59,322	38.02%	36,386	95,708	80.60%	New South Wales	Liberal
Gippsland	60.16%	51,196	39.84%	33,910	85,106	80.75%	Victoria	National
Goldstein	76.30%	69,726	23.70%	21,663	91,389	86.05%	Victoria	Liberal
Gorton	53.34%	49,834	46.66%	43,587	93,421	77.34%	Victoria	Labor
Grayndler	79.89%	73,208	20.11%	18,429	91,637	85.10%	New South Wales	Labor
Greenway	46.36%	38,016	53.64%	43,980	81,996	76.50%	New South Wales	Labor
Grey	53.31%	40,811	46.69%	35,750	76,561	75.21%	South Australia	Liberal
Griffith	76.60%	69,171	23.40%	21,132	90,303	81.80%	Queensland	Labor
Groom	49.16%	40,536	50.84%	41,915	82,451	79.97%	Queensland	Liberal National
Hasluck	62.41%	47,880	37.59%	28,836	76,716	79.72%	Western Australia	Liberal
Herbert	62.85%	48,110	37.15%	28,441	76,551	72.13%	Queensland	Labor
Higgins	78.34%	70,059	21.66%	19,375	89,434	84.36%	Victoria	Liberal
Hindmarsh	63.29%	57,947	36.71%	33,613	91,560	81.72%	South Australia	Labor
Hinkler	50.69%	40,649	49.31%	39,548	80,197	78.21%	Queensland	Liberal National
Holt	50.68%	47,147	49.32%	45,875	93,022	76.75%	Victoria	Labor
Hotham	59.60%	47,986	40.40%	32,524	80,510	80.37%	Victoria	Labor
Hughes	58.41%	51,337	41.59%	36,558	87,895	83.79%	New South Wales	Liberal
Hume	58.57%	51,284	41.43%	36,271	87,555	78.91%	New South Wales	Liberal
Hunter	64.38%	59,137	35.62%	32,723	91,860	78.48%	New South Wales	Labor
Indi	63.09%	54,563	36.91%	31,925	86,488	82.09%	Victoria	Independent
Isaacs	65.33%	56,645	34.67%	30,063	86,708	80.78%	Victoria	Labor
Jagajaga	73.51%	65,098	26.49%	23,453	88,551	85.25%	Victoria	Labor
Kennedy	46.74%	33,160	53.26%	37,784	70,944	70.50%	Queensland	Katter's Australian
Kingsford Smith	64.11%	56,297	35.89%	31,510	87,807	79.72%	New South Wales	Labor
Kingston	68.10%	58,863	31.90%	27,567	86,430	80.67%	South Australia	Labor
Kooyong	73.67%	63,592	26.33%	22,729	86,321	85.95%	Victoria	Liberal
La Trobe	67.45%	61,807	32.55%	29,826	91,633	82.87%	Victoria	Liberal
Lalor	56.78%	57,062	43.22%	43,429	100,491	77.00%	Victoria	Labor
Leichhardt	63.37%	47,750	36.63%	27,606	75,356	67.84%	Queensland	Liberal National
Lilley	67.66%	59,991	32.34%	28,671	88,662	81.44%	Queensland	Labor
Lindsay	56.17%	49,071	43.83%	38,295	87,366	76.47%	New South Wales	Labor
Lingiari	54.48%	19,026	45.52%	15,898	34,924	50.13%	Northern Territory	Labor
Longman	60.43%	51,268	39.57%	33,576	84,844	77.82%	Queensland	Labor
Lyne	55.31%	51,416	44.69%	41,539	92,955	81.32%	New South Wales	National
Lyons	58.70%	35,894	41.30%	25,258	61,152	78.09%	Tasmania	Labor
Macarthur	52.05%	43,323	47.95%	39,907	83,230	75.37%	New South Wales	Labor
Mackellar	68.01%	62,350	31.99%	29,330	91,680	84.00%	New South Wales	Liberal
Macquarie	63.87%	56,180	36.13%	31,778	87,958	82.67%	New South Wales	Labor
Makin	60.44%	51,547	39.56%	33,743	85,290	79.55%	South Australia	Labor
Mallee	54.28%	42,495	45.72%	35,795	78,290	78.76%	Victoria	National
Maranoa	43.91%	35,475	56.09%	45,308	80,783	78.25%	Queensland	Liberal National
Maribyrnong	59.87%	53,208	40.13%	35,658	88,866	78.97%	Victoria	Labor
Mayo	64.74%	57,361	35.26%	31,247	88,608	83.75%	South Australia	Centre Alliance
McEwen	65.39%	73,705	34.61%	39,007	112,712	80.75%	Victoria	Labor
McMahon	35.07%	29,146	64.93%	53,967	83,113	77.85%	New South Wales	Labor
McMillan	62.75%	61,479	37.25%	36,500	97,979	81.45%	Victoria	Liberal
McPherson	65.48%	54,034	34.52%	28,486	82,520	78.09%	Queensland	Liberal National
Melbourne	83.69%	81,287	16.31%	15,839	97,126	82.84%	Victoria	Greens
Melbourne Ports	81.97%	70,589	18.03%	15,523	86,112	82.16%	Victoria	Labor
Menzies	56.95%	47,137	43.05%	35,626	82,763	84.06%	Victoria	Liberal
Mitchell	49.10%	42,112	50.90%	43,652	85,764	81.56%	New South Wales	Liberal
Moncrieff	63.78%	50,566	36.22%	28,717	79,283	75.91%	Queensland	Liberal National
Moore	67.99%	56,690	32.01%	26,690	83,380	83.17%	Western Australia	Liberal
Moreton	60.92%	47,418	39.08%	30,413	77,831	79.59%	Queensland	Labor
Murray	57.62%	48,205	42.38%	35,452	83,657	79.58%	Victoria	National
New England	52.52%	44,608	47.48%	40,324	84,932	76.91%	New South Wales	National
Newcastle	74.78%	71,158	25.22%	23,999	95,157	82.69%	New South Wales	Labor
North Sydney	71.79%	64,813	28.21%	25,473	90,286	83.76%	New South Wales	Liberal
O'Connor	56.17%	43,554	43.83%	33,987	77,541	75.73%	Western Australia	Liberal
Oxley	60.33%	44,655	39.67%	29,365	74,020	76.08%	Queensland	Labor
Page	59.72%	55,943	40.28%	37,727	93,670	78.56%	New South Wales	National
Parkes	52.74%	41,408	47.26%	37,108	78,516	72.56%	New South Wales	National
Parramatta	38.38%	29,299	61.62%	47,038	76,337	74.82%	New South Wales	Labor
Paterson	65.52%	60,915	34.48%	32,059	92,974	79.35%	New South Wales	Labor
Pearce	63.89%	54,305	36.11%	30,699	85,004	76.35%	Western Australia	Liberal
Perth	71.46%	57,510	28.54%	22,967	80,477	80.55%	Western Australia	Labor
Petrie	61.64%	53,144	38.36%	33,067	86,211	78.75%	Queensland	Liberal National
Port Adelaide	61.30%	53,649	38.70%	33,869	87,518	76.31%	South Australia	Labor
Rankin	54.56%	41,570	45.44%	34,621	76,191	74.53%	Queensland	Labor
Reid	52.73%	43,567	47.27%	39,061	82,628	77.69%	New South Wales	Liberal
Richmond	67.87%	62,591	32.13%	29,625	92,216	80.28%	New South Wales	Labor
Riverina	54.63%	47,333	45.37%	39,308	86,641	77.22%	New South Wales	National
Robertson	65.72%	58,689	34.28%	30,614	89,303	81.42%	New South Wales	Liberal
Ryan	72.66%	64,967	27.34%	24,451	89,418	84.67%	Queensland	Liberal National
Scullin	53.37%	48,245	46.63%	42,147	90,392	79.91%	Victoria	Liberal
Shortland	67.67%	62,455	32.33%	29,836	92,291	82.47%	New South Wales	Labor
Solomon	65.26%	29,660	34.74%	15,792	45,452	66.81%	Northern Territory	Labor
Stirling	61.11%	47,225	38.89%	30,060	77,285	78.40%	Western Australia	Liberal
Sturt	61.57%	52,308	38.43%	32,655	84,963	81.45%	South Australia	Liberal
Swan	64.66%	49,093	35.34%	26,830	75,923	77.69%	Western Australia	Liberal
Sydney	83.67%	76,144	16.33%	14,860	91,004	80.49%	New South Wales	Labor
Tangney	61.63%	48,338	38.37%	30,090	78,428	84.04%	Western Australia	Liberal
Wakefield	61.00%	52,636	39.00%	33,649	86,285	75.69%	South Australia	Labor
Wannon	61.01%	49,340	38.99%	31,529	80,869	81.39%	Victoria	Liberal
Warringah	75.01%	64,999	24.99%	21,660	86,659	83.93%	New South Wales	Liberal
Watson	30.36%	24,915	69.64%	57,160	82,075	76.96%	New South Wales	Labor
Wentworth	80.85%	69,279	19.15%	16,410	85,689	82.57%	New South Wales	Liberal
Werriwa	36.26%	30,252	63.74%	53,174	83,426	74.08%	New South Wales	Labor
Whitlam	62.27%	57,562	37.73%	34,879	92,441	80.08%	New South Wales	Labor
Wide Bay	55.65%	46,507	44.35%	37,065	83,572	79.49%	Queensland	Liberal National
Wills	69.95%	68,450	30.05%	29,399	97,849	82.95%	Victoria	Labor
Wright	56.81%	47,109	43.19%	35,812	82,921	78.98%	Queensland	Liberal National

=== Demographic factors ===
Australia's 150 electorates plotted between survey responses and selected demographic characteristics (derived from 2016 Australian census)

A majority of survey participants returned affirmative responses in 133 electorates. The 17 electorates with majority negative responses were predominantly in Western Sydney (12 electorates), as well as rural Queensland (three electorates) and outer suburban Melbourne (two electorates). Defying a national trend, in New South Wales, country participants were more likely to vote yes than their city counterparts.

Most electorates either swung heavily in favour or against same sex marriage. There were only 25 electorates in which the result was between 45 and 55 per cent. In contrast, 41 electorates at the 2016 Australian federal election had two party preferred results within the same degree of margin (±5 per cent). At the 2013 election, 49 electorates were as approximately close.

The heavy concentration of negative responses in working-class, multicultural Western Sydney led to speculation about the underlying economic and demographic factors leading to the result. The Guardian noted that the portion of persons holding religious beliefs in an electorate was one of the strongest factors, calculating a −0.8 correlation between religion and responding affirmatively. Islam, followed by Oriental Orthodox and Catholicism were the strongest predictors of negative responses. Affirmative responses were correlated to income and education, and to a lesser extent, being born in Australia.

There was a higher percentage of responses to the survey from 18 and 19-year olds than any other age group under 45, despite concerns during the survey period that this group would be disenfranchised.

== Aftermath ==
=== Marriage Amendment Act ===
Several hours after the results of the survey were released, Senator Dean Smith introduced the Marriage Amendment (Definition and Religious Freedoms) Bill 2017 into the Australian Senate. The bill amended the definition of "marriage" in the Marriage Act to recognise a "union of 2 people", which would enable same-sex marriage. The bill drafted by Liberal Senator James Paterson, which would have extended further protections and exemptions for people opposed to same-sex marriage was dropped, with the Senator and several conservative MPs instead deciding to offer amendments to the Smith bill during parliamentary debate. There was some unresolved disagreement by politicians who advocated for a "No" result as to whether further religious protections should be added to the Smith bill as an amendment at this time or whether a later bill for this purpose should be considered.

The bill passed the Senate by 43 votes to 12 on 29 November 2017, with none of the amendments providing further protections and exemptions being accepted. Openly gay MP and same-sex marriage advocate Tim Wilson proposed in Parliament to his partner, Ryan Bolger, who was in the public gallery. Bolger accepted Wilson's proposal. It was the first known engagement on the floor of the House of Representatives. The bill passed the House of Representatives without amendment on 7 December 2017. It received royal assent on 8 December 2017 and came into effect the following day. Existing same-sex marriages performed outside Australia were recognized from 9 December, while new marriages required one month's notice, and so began from 9 January 2018. Several couples successfully applied for an exemption from the notice period, and the first legal same-sex wedding under Australian law was held on 15 December 2017, with further weddings occurring the following day.

==== Democratic representation ====
The survey revealed differences between the views of some MPs and the majority of their constituents on this issue. Several Labor MPs in Western Sydney electorates recommitted to voting in favour of same-sex marriage legislation, despite majority "No" votes among their constituents. Labor Senator Sam Dastyari acknowledged this issue, noting there was a "huge disconnect" of views on same-sex marriage within traditionally Labor-held seats in Western Sydney. Similarly, several Liberal MPs and Senators said they would vote "No" irrespective of the result in their electorate or state.

=== Reactions ===
Alex Greenwich of the "Yes" campaign stated the survey results represented a level of "unprecedented support and momentum [that] has exceeded the expectations, not just of this campaign, but any campaign in our history". Spokesperson for the "No" campaign and the Coalition for Marriage, Lyle Shelton said it was a disappointing result, but he accepted and respected the verdict of the people. Tony Abbott said the Parliament should "respect the result".

Speaking immediately after the survey results were released, Prime Minister Malcolm Turnbull called the outcome "overwhelming" and recommitted to passing same-sex marriage legislation in the Parliament before Christmas. Opposition Leader Bill Shorten shared that commitment and called on conservative MPs in the government to respect the will of the people and not attempt any delaying tactics in the parliament. The verdict announcement was watched and celebrated by tens of thousands of "Yes" supporters in capital cities. In Melbourne, several thousand people gathered outside the State Library of Victoria to watch the results before celebrations began in Melbourne's Lygon Street that evening. The huge "Yes" vote in Victoria prompted Premier Daniel Andrews to label the result reflective of Victoria's reputation as "the most progressive state" in the nation. A large crowd also descended on Prince Alfred Park in Sydney for the announcement, which included high-profile figures Magda Szubanski and Ian Thorpe in attendance. Reflecting on the atmosphere in Sydney, local newspaper The Sydney Morning Herald claimed the results reflected "a momentous civil rights milestone" for Australia. Smaller crowds also gathered in several locations in Canberra, Adelaide and Perth to celebrate the result. In Canberra (capital city of the Australian Capital Territory, the jurisdiction with the highest "Yes" vote in the country), the results were celebrated festively into the night, as thousands of people forced the closure of Lonsdale Street in the city. Labor Party Senator Penny Wong's appearance onstage at the event "drew thunderous applause from a crowd of thousands".

The results were welcomed by many representatives of Australia's business community. Among the highest profile of them was Qantas CEO Alan Joyce, who called it "an amazing outcome and we should all be very proud of this amazing country", an observation shared by leaders of corporate bodies Telstra and ANZ Bank. Businesses related to the wedding industry, such as florists, bakers and others were poised to reap the benefit of what some projected to be a multi-billion dollar boost to the industry over the following 12 months. The social media coverage of the results announcement was so immense that, with more than 4000 tweets sent every second during the peak of the day, the survey results trend was more than 10 times as popular as Australia's "race that stops the nation", the Melbourne Cup.

In celebration of the "Yes" vote, a Sydney-based visual artist painted a large, "light-hearted mural" on the wall of the Botany View Hotel, Newtown, depicting Tony Abbott with his hand down the pants of Cardinal George Pell. The mural was later defaced and painted over in black paint. The visual artist said he planned to leave the defaced mural as it was, stating "when you're making public art, the reaction is important, the reaction is needed".

Archbishop Denis Hart of the Roman Catholic Archdiocese of Melbourne issued a statement on behalf of the Australian Catholic Bishops' Conference, saying the results did not change the church's understandings of marriage and noting the 4.8 million Australians who voted "No" should have their concerns recognised by "putting in place strong conscience and religious freedom protections". These sentiments were shared by the leaders of the Anglican Church of Australia. Reflecting on the heavily concentrated "No" vote prominent in Western Sydney electorates, Keysar Trad, former president of the Australian Federation of Islamic Councils, labelled it "heartening" and praised the role of faith leaders in both the Muslim and Christian communities in the region. Being born overseas has been noted to correlate with a "No" response and religious belief to correlate even more strongly. Social progressives received criticism for allegedly ignoring the "No" vote among Islamic communities, though a Guardian blog argued that religion was connected with the "No" vote.

World leaders to congratulate Australia for the result included Nicola Sturgeon (First Minister of Scotland), Justin Trudeau (Prime Minister of Canada) and Theresa May (Prime Minister of the United Kingdom).

The survey ran more than $40 million under its projected budget of $122 million. Greens leader Richard Di Natale wrote to the Prime Minister requesting that some of the unused funds be redirected to mental health and other support services for LGBT Australians hurt by the campaign. The survey added $26.3 million in revenue to Australia Post.

=== Mental health impact ===
A 2019 University of Sydney study found that the same-sex marriage debate led to elevated psychological distress for lesbian, gay, and bisexual people during the survey period, including increased levels of depression, anxiety and stress. The research also found that same-sex attracted Australians benefitted from public displays of support from family and friends, which increased their resilience during the process. Another 2019 study conducted for the Australia Institute similarly found that "the marriage equality debate represented an acute external minority stress event that had measurable negative impacts on mental health of LGBTIQ people and their allies".

== See also ==
- LGBTQ rights in Australia

=== Other same-sex marriage referendums ===
- 2016 Bermudian same-sex union and marriage referendum
- 2013 Croatian constitutional referendum
- Irish same-sex marriage referendum, 2015
- 2015 Slovak same-sex marriage referendum
- 2015 Slovenian same-sex marriage referendum
- 2021 Swiss same-sex marriage referendum
- 2022 Cuban Family Code referendum
- United States:
  - Maine:
    - 2009 Maine same-sex marriage referendum
    - 2012 Maine same-sex marriage referendum
  - 2012 Maryland same-sex marriage referendum
  - 2012 Washington same-sex marriage referendum
