= Ebiquity =

Marketing and media consultancy firm

Ebiquity, Plc.
- Type: Public LSE EBQ
- Industry: Professional marketing and media consultancy services
- Founded: 1997
- Headquarters: London
- Area served: Worldwide
- Key people: Ruben Schreurs; (Group Chief Executive Officer); Mark Gay; (Group Chief Operations Officer); Peter Hanford; (Group Chief Revenue Officer); Lars Noordewier; (Group Chief Technology Officer); Rob Woodward; (Non-Executive Chairman)
- Services: Media practice (Media Management, Performance, and Compliance); Analytics & Tech practice (Digital Analytics and Advanced Analytics; Tech Strategy and Tech Platform Deployment)
- Revenue: £80.2m
- Number of employees: 650+ (2020)
- Website: www.ebiquity.com

Ebiquity is an independent marketing and media consultancy.

== History ==
Sarah-Jane and Steve Thomson founded Thomson Intermedia in 1997, building a comprehensive database of advertising creative executions and advertising spend in the UK. The media monitoring and analytics business was floated on AIM (the Alternative Investment Market) in 2000.

In 2005, Thomson Intermedia acquired Billetts – a media and marketing performance consultancy and auditing business, founded more than a decade earlier by John Billett and Andy Pearch – for £13m. The acquisition enabled Thomsons to enhance its advertising intelligence database with the actual cost paid for media, not just rate card values.

In 2007, the Thomsons appointed Mike Greenlees (founder of creative agency Gold Greenlees Trott) and Nick Manning (founder of media agency Manning Gottlieb) as joint chief executives, stepping back from day-to-day management. The appointment led the company to grow rapidly by acquisition, expanding into both new services and new territories over the next eight years.

The holding company rebranded from Thomson Intermedia to Ebiquity in 2008. Xtreme Information Services, a global advertising and media intelligence business, was acquired in 2010, and in February 2011, all 18 Billets and Xtreme trading offices around the world became Ebiquity. In May 2011, Ebiquity acquired Echo Research, a news and social media analytics and reputation research business, followed by global media consultancy Fairbrother Lenz Eley in March 2012. Subsequent acquisitions included:

- FirmDecisions the world’s leading media contract compliance business (2012)
- Stratigent, a multi-channel analytics business in the U.S. (2013)
- China Media Consulting Group (2014)

Oh his retirement in January 2016, Greenlees was replaced as Group CEO by Michael Karg, who joined after 15 years at Publicis Groupe agencies Razorfish and Digitas. Karg’s appointment marked a change in direction for Ebiquity, with the company positioning itself as “the left-brain advisor to the CMO”, independent of the media supply chain, and offering more strategic consultancy services. In addition to media efficiency through its Media practice, Ebiquity focused more heavily on marketing effectiveness.

This change of strategic direction manifested itself in both the parts of the business Ebiquity sold on as well as a smaller number of targeted acquisitions.

In February 2018, Ebiquity announced it planned to sell its advertising intelligence business, a merger of the founding Thomson Intermedia business and the acquired Xtreme Information Services. The disposal was subject to a full, two-phase investigation by the U.K. Competition & Markets Authority – Phase 1 to a Statutory Timetable, Phase 2 to an Administrative Timetable – which approved the sale of the business to Nielsen for £26m in November 2019. Ebiquity was reported at the time as saying the deal would enable it to accelerate “its ambition of becoming the world's leading independent marketing and media consultancy”. During this period of restructuring, the company also sold on its reputation research business, Echo Research, back to its founder.

Acquisitions established during Karg’s tenure included Digital Balance, an independent digital consultancy business located in Perth, Western Australia (August 2017) and digital media consultancy Digital Decisions (concluded January 2020). Digital Decisions CEO Ruben Schreurs has been named Group Chief Product Officer of Ebiquity in November 2020.

The company underwent a complete rebrand in 2018, and published both a Statement of Independence from the media supply chain and a Code of Conduct for businesses providing independent consultancy advice on marketing effectiveness.

Karg left Ebiquity in November 2019, and for more than seven months the company’s Chief Financial Officer, Alan Newman, served as interim Chief Executive Officer. In April 2020, Ebiquity announced that its new Group Chief Executive Officer would be Nick Waters, joining from ad network Dentsu Aegis and taking charge from 1 July 2020. At Dentsu Aegis, Waters had most recently served as the company’s group executive chairman, UK & Ireland, following nine years as CEO of Asia Pacific.

In March 2022, Ebiquity acquired the Swedish agency selection, media performance measurement and media benchmarking company, MediaPath Network. It also acquired the US-based media audit specialist, Media Management Inc.

In November 2024, Ebiquity appointed Ruben Schreurs as Group Chief Executive Officer, succeeding Nick Waters. Schreurs had previously served as Ebiquity's Chief Strategy Officer and Chief Product Officer, roles he assumed after the company's acquisition of Digital Decisions in 2020, a consultancy he founded. In January 2026, Schreurs recommitted the business to its Marketing Effectiveness focus, with Ebiquity positioned as an 'independent authority on marketing effectiveness'.

== Services ==
The company has 18 offices globally in 14 of the world’s leading advertising markets, including London, Paris, Madrid, New York, Sydney, Shanghai, and Singapore.

Ebiquity provides advertisers with consultancy services grouped three areas: Transform, Govern and Grow.

- Transform: services such as Agency Selection and Management (including pitch management) and In-housing Consultancy provide strategic consultancy on media operating models
- Govern: services such as Digital Media Governance, Media Benchmarking and Contract Compliance provide brands with independent governance of their media investments. Contract Compliance is delivered via Ebiquity’s subsidiary company, FirmDecisions.
- Grow: marketing effectiveness services such as Marketing Mix Modelling (Econometrics) and Brand Equity Analytics aim to help brands measure the impact of their media investments.

== Publications ==
Ebiquity has for many years published independent reports into the evolving media and marketing ecosystem and the impact of innovations in marketing on advertisers’ return on investment.

In 2011, 2014, 2017 and 2024, Ebiquity partnered with U.K. TV industry association Thinkbox to publish independent marketing effectiveness research reports on the return on investment generated by different media channels, both traditional and digital. The most recent report, Profit Ability 2: The New Business Case of Advertising was published in May 2024. A similar study covering the Australian TV market was published in partnership with ThinkTV titled Payback Australia.

In July 2016, Ebiquity and FirmDecisions were joint authors with the U.S. Association of National Advertisers (ANA) of the first major report to highlight the challenges around transparency in the U.S. media market. Media Transparency: Prescriptions, Principles, and Processes for Advertisers put the issue of media transparency on the media agenda and set out a blueprint of how advertisers could secure greater transparency in their media trading.

In February 2019, Ebiquity published a research report titled TV at the Tipping Point highlighting the fact that advertisers are decreasingly able to reach mass audiences at scale using TV advertising. This was followed a year later with a follow-up report titled Mind the Gap which showed that viewers are deserting linear live TV even quicker than predicted in the first report and that digital video channels such as YouTube and Facebook are unable to close the coverage gap. In reviewing Ebiquity’s report TV at the Tipping Point, independent marketing professor and columnist Mark Ritson wrote in Marketing Week: “Ebiquity has come to stand for something that we rarely encounter these days in media: truth.”
