= Roz Ward =

British-Australian academic, teacher and socialist activist

Roz Ward is a British-Australian academic, teacher and socialist activist who is best known as being one of the co-founders of the Safe Schools Coalition Australia. Ward is a member of the Victorian Socialists executive.

== Education and Career ==
Ward is a qualified primary school teacher and has lectured in teacher education programs at several universities including Deakin University, RMIT University, and the University of Melbourne. She completed a PhD in Education at RMIT University in 2022. Her research focuses on social justice in education and inclusive school cultures. Ward is a member of the National Tertiary Education Union.

== Safe Schools Coalition ==
Ward was a co-founder of the Safe Schools Coalition Australia (SSCA) and a central figure in the program. She was involved in compiling the accompanying notes for teachers and parents for the children's story book The Gender Fairy, which was promoted by the SSCA. Ward stated that the program set out "towards creating safer, happier, and more inclusive schools" for LGBTI students.

In June 2016 Ward made a Facebook post about a ceremony where a rainbow flag was raised above Victorian Parliament. In the post, she wrote: "Now we just need to get rid of the racist Australian flag on top of state parliament and get a red one up there and my work is done." The post was leaked to the media, triggering a wave of critical coverage from conservative outlets and figures who had long opposed the Safe Schools program. La Trobe University suspended Ward, who ran the Safe Schools Coalition through the university's Australian Research Centre in Sex, Health and Society for the comments. Ward was also suspended from the Safe Schools program. In response to the controversy, Ward announced her resignation from an advisory role with the Victorian government, stating, "I apologise for any offence that comments, posted on my private Facebook page, may have caused the government and members of the LGBTI community. These were private comments that were never intended for the public domain."

Then Prime Minister Malcolm Turnbull said Ward's actions "underlined concerns many people had about how the program was managed". Following legal action threatened by her solicitors, the university's Vice-Chancellor, John Dewar, reinstated her. The university stated that her comments "had the potential to inflame opinion about the controversial Safe Schools program" but decided against pursuing the misconduct allegations, stating it was "not in the university's best interest to pursue the matter". In its suspension letter, the university claimed her conduct had "undermined public confidence" in her and the program, "damaged the reputation" of Safe Schools, and drawn her colleagues into negative publicity, impacting "their ability to continue with their research in a safe environment".

Her suspension had sparked a social media campaign in her support, with more than 5,000 people backing a "We Stand With Roz Ward" Facebook page. The National Tertiary Education Union condemned the suspension, describing it as an "anti-intellectual, anti-democratic attack" and stated that Ward was a "victim of... political bullying." The incident prompted Beyond Blue chairman and former premier of Victoria Jeff Kennett to threaten the withdrawal of future funding for the program and to call for Ward's resignation due to her "extreme political views".

== Victorian Socialists ==
In the 2020 Victorian local elections, Ward was the Victorian Socialists candidate for the City of Darebin's South Central Ward, winning 7.72% of the vote. During her campaign, Ward highlighted several key policy platforms, including advocating for refugees in detention, increasing publicly funded childcare and aged care, and securing more public and affordable housing. She also supported converting the Northcote Golf Course into public parkland, arguing it was the largest green space in Darebin and should be more widely accessible.

In the 2022 Victorian state election, Ward was the candidate for the seat of Richmond, winning 4.6% of the vote. During the campaign, she released a satirical election pamphlet that parodied one from the Labor candidate. Her campaign reported knocking on more than 10,000 doors in the electorate.

In the 2025 Australian federal election, Ward was the campaign manager for Jordan van den Lamb's senate campaign.
