= Carol Johnson (academic) =

Australian political scientist

- Occupation: Professor
- Employer: University of Adelaide
- Known for: Australian politics and her new book Social Democracy and the Crisis of Equality: Australian Social Democracy in a Changing World
- Notable work: Research into sexuality, gender and feminism, Publications about the Labour government in Australian politics
- Title: FASSA
- Awards: Lifetime Achievement Award 2019
- Honours: Emerita professor

Carol Johnson FASSA is an Emerita professor at the Department of Politics and International Relations at the University of Adelaide, known for her work on Australian politics and her new book Social Democracy and the Crisis of Equality: Australian Social Democracy in a Changing World. She has also done research into sexuality, gender and feminism.

She is active on the website The Conversation, writing articles on Australian politics, critically examining the political environment of the country.

== Career ==
Her early work includes publications about the Labour government in Australian politics. Johnson was president of the Australian Political Studies Association briefly from 1998-1999.

Since 2000, Johnson's work has been focussed on Australian politics, but it also includes research into the lesbian and gay movement. She also edited The Social Sciences in the Asian Century, investigating the "on the challenges of practising the social sciences in the Asia-Pacific region in the twenty-first century".

Johnson was elected Fellow of the Academy of Social Sciences in Australia in 2005 and served as a member of its executive committee for two years from 2012 until 2014.

In 2019, Johnson won the Lifetime Achievement Award from the Australian Political Studies Association.
