= Gayby Baby =

2015 film by Maya Newell

- Directed by: Maya Newell
- Produced by: Charlotte Mars
- Cinematography: Maya Newell
- Edited by: Rochelle Oshlack
- Music by: Max Lyandvert
- Production company: Marla House
- Release dates: 29 April 2015 (Hot Docs); 3 September 2015
- Running time: 85 minutes
- Country: Australia
- Language: English

Gayby Baby is a 2015 Australian documentary film directed by Maya Newell that follows four children raised by same-sex parents.

== Synopsis ==
Gayby Baby observes the lives of four children—Gus, Ebony, Matt and Graham—whose parents are either gay or lesbian, and explores the ways in which growing up as a "gayby" has affected them.

== Production ==
Gayby Baby was produced over three and a half years. It was conceived and directed by Maya Newell, who was raised by lesbian mothers and felt that, in the same-sex marriage debate in the Australian media, "no one was actually talking to any kids". She chose to address the topic of LGBT parenting from an observational perspective without entering the political debate around the issue, so that the film "addresses people's questions about that, but in a very non-political way because we're just watching this kid's life". Newell also intended for the film to be an educational resource for teachers, so that they would be better equipped to answer children's questions about same-sex parenting and to address bullying of children with gay or lesbian parents. The idea for the film originated from a short documentary, Growing Up Gayby, filmed by Newell for ABC2 in 2013.

The families featured in the film were cast from around Australia; the filmmakers considered 30–40 children before selecting four 11–12-year-olds and their families. Newell approached one of the families and asked them to appear in the film after seeing a photograph of them in a newspaper.

The film's funding was raised through a crowdfunding campaign and government grants. The filmmakers advertised the project on Pozible, a crowdfunding website, in 2012; it raised A$118,375 from 1244 people, which at the time was the highest number of supporters for a film campaign on the website. In October 2014, Newell pitched the film at Good Pitch Australia, where it received $180,000 in pledges from the Safe Schools Coalition, the Foundation for Young Australians, the Australian Primary Principals Association and the Sydney Film Festival.

Newell and Mars founded their own production company during the making of the film, called Marla House.

== Release ==
Initially, film director Maya Newell offered Gayby Baby to be screened in schools ahead of the film's official release for Wear it Purple Day 2015.

The world premiere of Gayby Baby was held on 29 April 2015 at the Hot Docs Canadian International Documentary Festival in Toronto. The film premiered in Australia at the Sydney Film Festival in June 2015 and was released theatrically on 3 September 2015.

A screening was planned during class time at Burwood Girls High School on 28 August 2015. Mark Powell, a Presbyterian minister who gives seminars on Christianity at the school, told supporters he would organise to have the film banned and to contact as many media outlets as possible. The Sydney Morning Herald reported that the school did not receive any formal complaints from parents. A subsequent report in The Daily Telegraph said parents had complained to the school, the Education Department and to the Minister for Education, Adrian Piccoli, who directed all public schools in New South Wales not to show the film during class time, and told Macquarie Radio, "schools are not places for political issues to be aired". Human Rights Commissioner Tim Wilson says he has no issue with the New South Wales government prohibiting the documentary from being shown. While Newell stated that she does not "see the film as having a political agenda necessarily or pushing anything down anyone's throat", the film has been marketed as "stirring" political debate on same-sex marriage. The debate also included the role of schools in articulating contentious subjects.

The film was acquired for theatrical and digital distribution in the US, UK and Ireland with a release date of April 29, 2016. In the US it received a PG rating from the MPAA and in the UK at PG rating from the BBFC.

In May 2016 it was reported that the Victorian Government-supported Safe Schools Coalition Australia program will include Gayby Baby as a resource for students in grade five to year 10.
