= Maya Newell =

Australian filmmaker

Maya Newell is an Australian filmmaker, known for the feature-length documentaries Gayby Baby (2015) and In My Blood It Runs (2019). She works at Closer Productions in Adelaide, South Australia.

Newell had intended to study international relations or medicine, but at the age of 17 won a scholarship to attend Sydney Film School for a year.

== Career ==
Newell made several documentary short films before her feature-length films. While still a student at the film school, she made a documentary called Richard (2007), about a passionate toymaker with whom she made friends while filming. After he killed himself during the making of the film, she wrestled with the ethics of completing the film, but decided ultimately that it was a way of helping to invoke empathy.

Gayby Baby observes the lives of four children whose parents are homosexual, examining the ways in which the sexual identity of their parents may have affected them. The impetus for the film was her own experience of growing up with two lesbian mothers, and she felt it was important to represent the child's perspective of being raised in such a family. During the making of the film, there was a public debate about marriage equality in Australia (which ultimately led to a successful plebiscite on the matter). The film was later shown on free-to-air national broadcaster SBS TV as well as Foxtel.

Newell and co-producer Charlotte Mars founded their own production company during the making of Gayby Baby, called Marla House, self-described as "a production house that revels in telling stories that are transporting, nuanced and a little bit subversive".

In My Blood It Runs, directed by Newell and produced by her, Sophie Hyde, Rachel Nanninaaq Edwardson, and Larissa Behrendt, was made in collaboration with Arrernte and Garrwa people in the Northern Territory. It had its world premiere at the Hot Docs Canadian International Documentary Festival in Toronto in April/May 2019. The film follows the story of 10-year-old Dujuan Hoosan, a healer and hunter, as his family tries to give him an Arrernte education alongside the western education system. Dujuan gets into trouble and was almost imprisoned once, and the film highlights the Age of criminal responsibility in Australia, which is (as of 2021) 10 years old. As a twelve-year-old, the boy was the youngest person ever to make a speech to the UN Human Rights Council about youth incarceration.

In My Blood It Runs premiered at Hot Docs Canadian International Documentary Festival, where it was nominated in the "Best International Documentary" category in 2019. Other award nominations included AACTA Awards, Durban International Film Festival Best Documentary, Film Critics Circle of Australia Awards, the Documentary Foundation Australia Award at the Sydney Film Festival and Best Documentary Feature at Warsaw International Film Festival.The film was screened on ABC TV on 5 July 5. In 2021, the film was made available for showing in schools in the UK.

In 2022, Newell debuted her long-awaited documentary short about transgender advocate Georgie Stone, titled The Dreamlife of Georgie Stone, at Tribeca Film Festival.

== Awards and nominations ==
Year	Ceremony	Category	Title	Work
2020	Film Critics Circle of Australia Awards	Best Feature Documentary	In My Blood It Runs	Nominee
2020	Australian Directors Guild Awards	Best Direction in a Documentary Feature	In My Blood It Runs	Winner
2019	Hot Docs Canadian International Documentary Festival	Best International Documentary	In My Blood It Runs	Nominee
2019	Sydney Film Festival	Documentary Australia Foundation Award	In My Blood It Runs	Nominee
2019	Durban International Film Festival	Best Documentary	In My Blood It Runs	Nominee
2019	Australian Academy of Cinema and Television Arts (AACTA) Awards	Best Documentary	In My Blood It Runs	Nominee
2019	Australian Academy of Cinema and Television Arts (AACTA) Awards	Best Cinematography in a Documentary	In My Blood It Runs	Nominee
2019	Warsaw International Film Festival	Best Documentary Feature	In My Blood It Runs	Nominee
2016	The WIFTS Foundation International Visionary Awards	The Documentary Award	Gayby Baby	Winner
2015	Sydney Film Festival	Audience Award	Gayby Baby	Nominee
