= Sydney's Pride History Group =

Sydney's Pride History Group was established as the first volunteer community group dedicated exclusively to preserving the history of LGBTIQ Sydney predominantly through the collection of oral history interviews. The Group's origins date from discussions held at the Sydney Pride Centre in between 2003 and 2004. The Group's Patrons are Sydney Lord Mayor Clover Moore, artist William Yang and Meredith Burgmann.

== History ==
By August 2003, Sydney's Pride History Group had incorporated as an Association, and now operates out of the suburb of Glebe. Australian LGBT rights activist, historian and political scientist Lex Watson served as President of the Group between 2010 until his death in 2014. Other Presidents include LGBTIQ activist Robert French who had previously served as Convenor of the New South Wales Gay and Lesbian Rights Lobby and Vice President of ACON and current President, Shirleene Robinson, an academic historian and marriage equality activist with Australian Marriage Equality.

== Activities ==
The main activity of Sydney's Pride History Group involves the collection of oral histories. The bulk of interviews have been collected as part of the 100 Voices Collection, which includes memories dating back to the 1950s. The 100 Voices Collection also includes interviews about what would become known later as Sydney Gay and Lesbian Mardi Gras, the HIV/AIDS epidemic, decriminalisation and the marriage equality movement. The 100 Voices Collection was launched in 2013 at Paddington Town Hall by New South Wales Governor Marie Bashir and Sydney Lord Mayor Clover Moore.

The Group has also published a number of books. These include Camp as a Row of Tents: The Life and Times of Sydney's Camp Social Clubs, Camp Nites: Sydney's Emerging Drag Scene in the '60s, New Day Dawning: The Early Years of Sydney's Gay and Lesbian Mardi Gras. and Out and About: Sydney's Lesbian Social Scene, 1960s-1980s. The Group was the auspicing organisation for the electronic publication of Unfit for Publication by Peter de Waal, which documents cases of sodomy and buggery which were prosecuted in New South Wales between 1796 and 1930 The Group is also mentioned as a community-driven LGBTIQ historical organisation of significance in a number of books, including Garry Wotherspoon's Gay Sydney: A History (2016) and Rebecca Jennings' Unnamed Desires: A Sydney Lesbian History (2015).

The Group is currently also working on an LGBTIQ Pioneer Names Project, which was launched by Lord Mayor Clover Moore and aims to record the individuals who played a role in shaping LGBTIQ Sydney.

Most recently, the Group launched PridePod, a podcasting series about Sydney's LGBTIQ history.

== Partnerships ==
Sydney's Pride History Group works closely with the City of Sydney, as well as a range of other organisations, including groups representing the 78ers who marched at the first Mardi Gras, local libraries, Australian Lesbian and Gay Archives and groups from across the LGBTIQ and the broader community. Outreach has taken place in a variety of locations, ranging from libraries to talks in pubs
