= Victorian Pride Centre =

LGBT community centre in Australia

- Atrium of the Victorian Pride Centre in 2025.
- Founded: 11 July 2021; 5 years ago
- Type: LGBT community centre
- Location: 79-81 Fitzroy Street, St Kilda, Victoria
- CEO: Craig Bell
- Website: pridecentre.org.au

The Victorian Pride Centre is an LGBT community centre located in St Kilda, Victoria. It is the first purpose-built pride centre in Australia, and has been described as a "gay town hall" hosting many queer organisations. That includes Melbourne Queer Film Festival, JOY Media, the Australian Queer Archives, the Victorian Pride Lobby, and the Star Observer. It also holds a cafe, offices, co-working spaces, health clinics, and event rooms.

== History ==
On 24 May 2016, Victorian Premier Daniel Andrews made a speech apologising for historic laws that made homosexual acts illegal, while committing $15 million in seed funding to build a pride centre. While the government claimed in a press release that this would be the first pride centre in Australia, Jennifer Mills pointed out that the Sydney Pride Centre was older, and said Daniel Andrews was in effect erasing LGBTQ history.

Three local governments bid to host the centre, with City of Port Phillip offering to donate a site in St Kilda. An architecture competition was held in 2017 for the former site of Monroe's restaurant, which closed in 2011. The winning design was selected from local St Kilda firms Grant Amon Architects, and Brearley Architects and Urbanists.

The Pride Centre was opened on 11 July 2021 by Daniel Andrews, Minister for Equality Martin Foley, and City of Port Phillip Mayor Louise Crawford.

== Architecture ==
The Victorian Pride Centre was designed by Grant Amon Architects, and Brearley Architects and Urbanists. It won the William Wardell Award for Public Architecture 2022, the Victorian Premiere's Design award 2022, as well as an AIA National Award for Public Architecture.

The Pride Centre is a five-storey L-shaped building on Fitzroy Street. It is Australia's first purpose-built pride centre, and one of the largest pride centres in the world, with 6200 square metres over three floors. The building uses a series of stacked tubular openings across its concrete facade, which stretches over the street to form a portico. The tubular forms are also used in the building's interior, creating tunnels. Much of the interior is exposed structural concrete with pipes and electrical works remaining exposed. There is a large emu-egg inspired atrium.

== Tenants ==
This is a list of the notable Pride Centre's tenants that has been adapted from their website.

- Victorian Pride Lobby
- Intersex Peer Support Australia
- Equality Australia
- Star Observer
- Monash Gender Clinic
- Transgender Victoria
- Australian Queer Archives
- JOY Media
- Melbourne Queer Film Festival
- Thorne Harbour Health

== See also ==
- Sydney Pride Centre
