= Ralph McLean =

Ralph McLean may refer to:

- Ralph McLean (broadcaster), Northern Irish TV presenter and radio DJ
- Ralph McLean (politician) (1957–2010), Australian politician
