= Ali Hogg =

Australian LGBTI activist

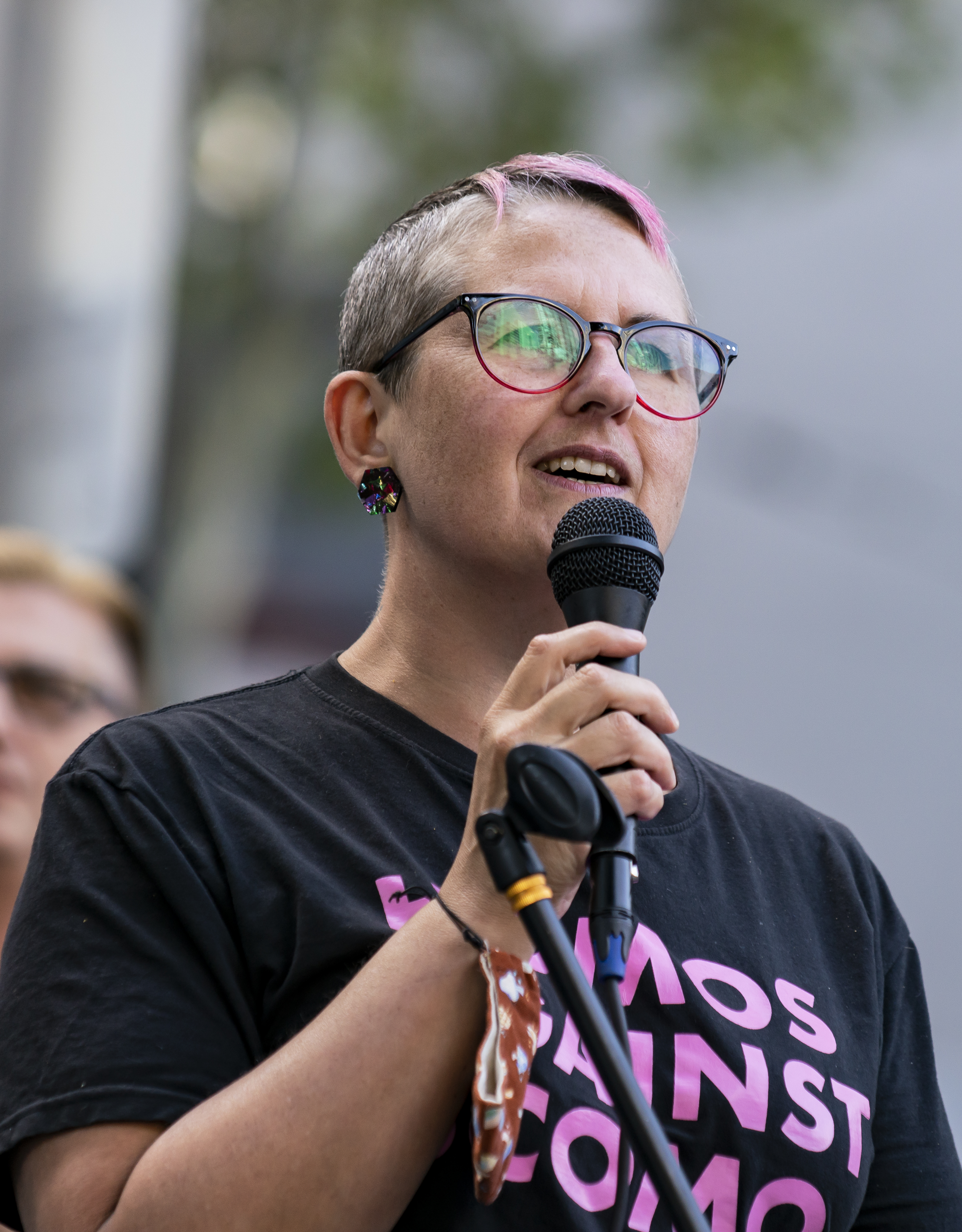
- Hogg in 2022
- Born: 17 June 1980 (age 46); Melbourne, Victoria, Australia
- Known for: Convenor for Equal Love Victoria

Ali Hogg (born 17 June 1980) is an Australian LGBTI activist, based in Melbourne. She is known for her campaigning for same-sex marriage and gay rights. As convenor for Equal Love in Victoria, SameSame.com.au reported that Hogg was voted the country's most influential LGBTI Australian in 2011 and the sixth most influential Melburnian by The Age for her activism that same year.

== Activities ==
On Wednesday, 15 November 2017, Equal Love and Ali Hogg held the final Equal love event in front of Victoria's State Library, Melbourne CBD. Speakers included Sarah and Jac Tomlins, as well as Jason and Adrian Tuazon McCheyne, both couples who sparked the controversial amendment to the marriage act in 2004, by attempting to get their Canadian marriages recognised in Australia. Results announced confirmed that 61.6% of people who participated in the non-binding postal survey voted 'Yes' . Hogg was one of several, prominent LGBTI activists recognised for their efforts advancing the cause of equal marriage rights in Australia, with her recent nomination for the Inspirational Women of Yarra awards 2018. The nomination celebrated how "For over a decade Ali has been instrumental in advancing marriage equality in Australia as the convener of Equal Love, Melbourne. She has shown extensive organisational support to minority voices and ensured that Equal Love rallies and forums were accessible for people with disabilities. The victory in winning marriage equality was due to years of campaigning and a mammoth effort by people such as Ali."

== Education and career ==
Hogg studied at the Victorian College of the Arts and became a freelance photographer, a profession she considers "paradoxical", as it includes some wedding photography. She is also a member of the grass roots activist group Socialist Alternative.

== See also ==
- Australian Marriage Equality
- Equal Love
- LGBTQ rights in Australia
- Socialist Alternative
- Victorian College of the Arts Alumni
