= Equal Love =

Australian-wide campaign to legalize homosexual marriage

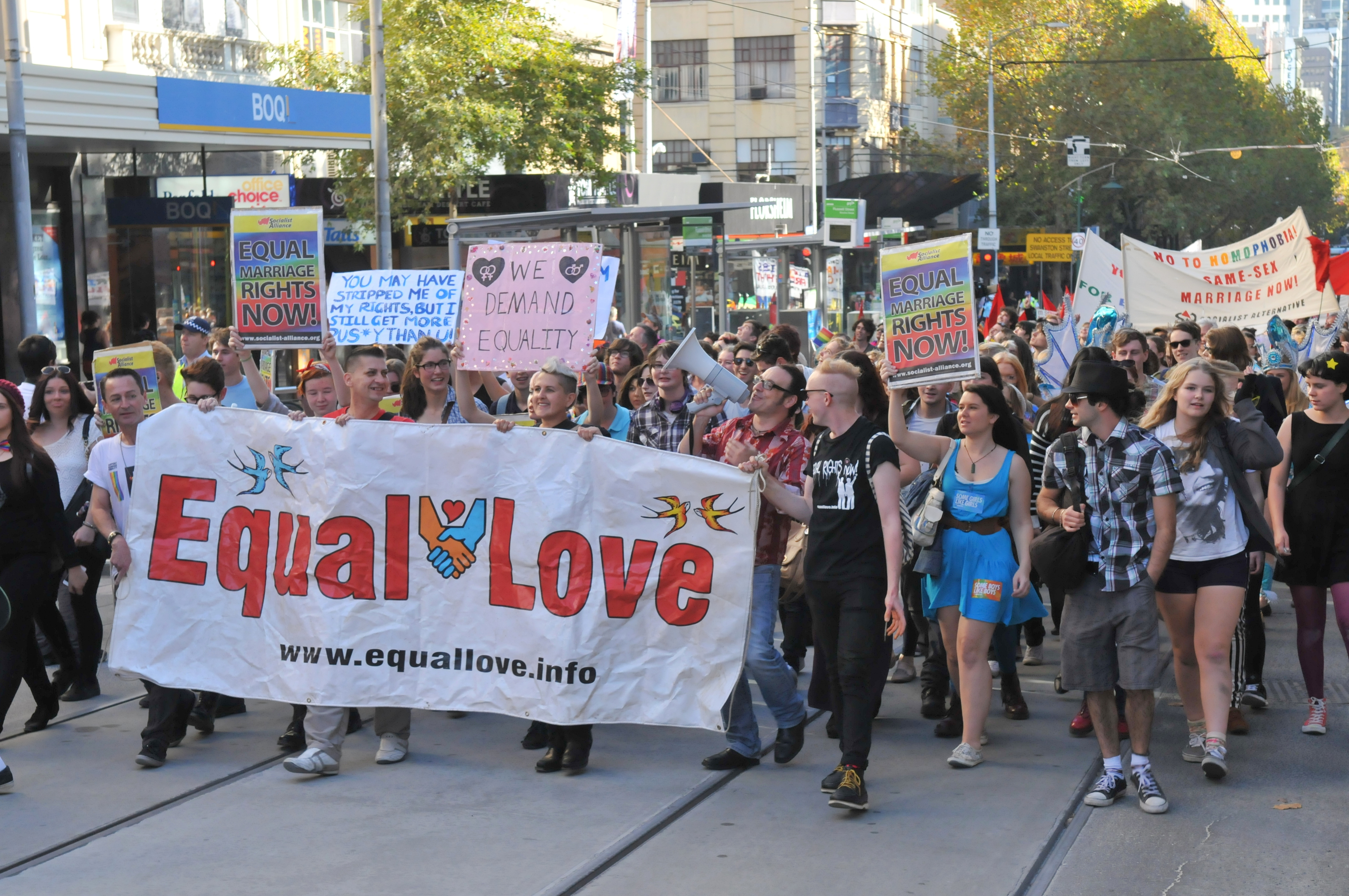
- Equal Love rally in Melbourne CBD
- Formation: 2004
- Type: Same-sex marriage campaign
- Location: Melbourne, Australia
- Convenor: Ali Hogg
- Website: equallove.info

Equal Love is an Australian-wide campaign initiated by the Victorian Gay and Lesbian Rights Lobby in an attempt to win gay and lesbian couples marriage rights in the country. The campaign involves a range of community, union, student and activist organisations whose aim is to influence public and government attitudes towards LGBTQ couples through education and direct action.

== History ==
The campaign began in 2004 in response to the Marriage Amendment Bill, introduced by the John Howard government which was passed by the Australian House of Representatives in June of that year, which stated that a same-sex union "must not be recognised as a marriage in Australia". In 2009, an Equal Love spokesperson claimed that "60% of Australians support equal same-sex marriage rights and the introduction of the gender neutral bill. Equal marriage rights are becoming a significant and central human rights issue." In 2010, tens of thousands of Australians participated in Equal Love demonstrations for same-sex marriage.

Equal Love has had the support of Amnesty International, the Australian Greens and other notable individuals such as Victorian Labor Party Minister for Education Bronwyn Pike, The Lord of the Rings star Ian McKellen and Australian Idol finalist Rob Mills.

In lobbying for same-sex marriage, the two organisations Equal Love and Community Action Against Homophobia share similar objectives.

== Notable achievements ==
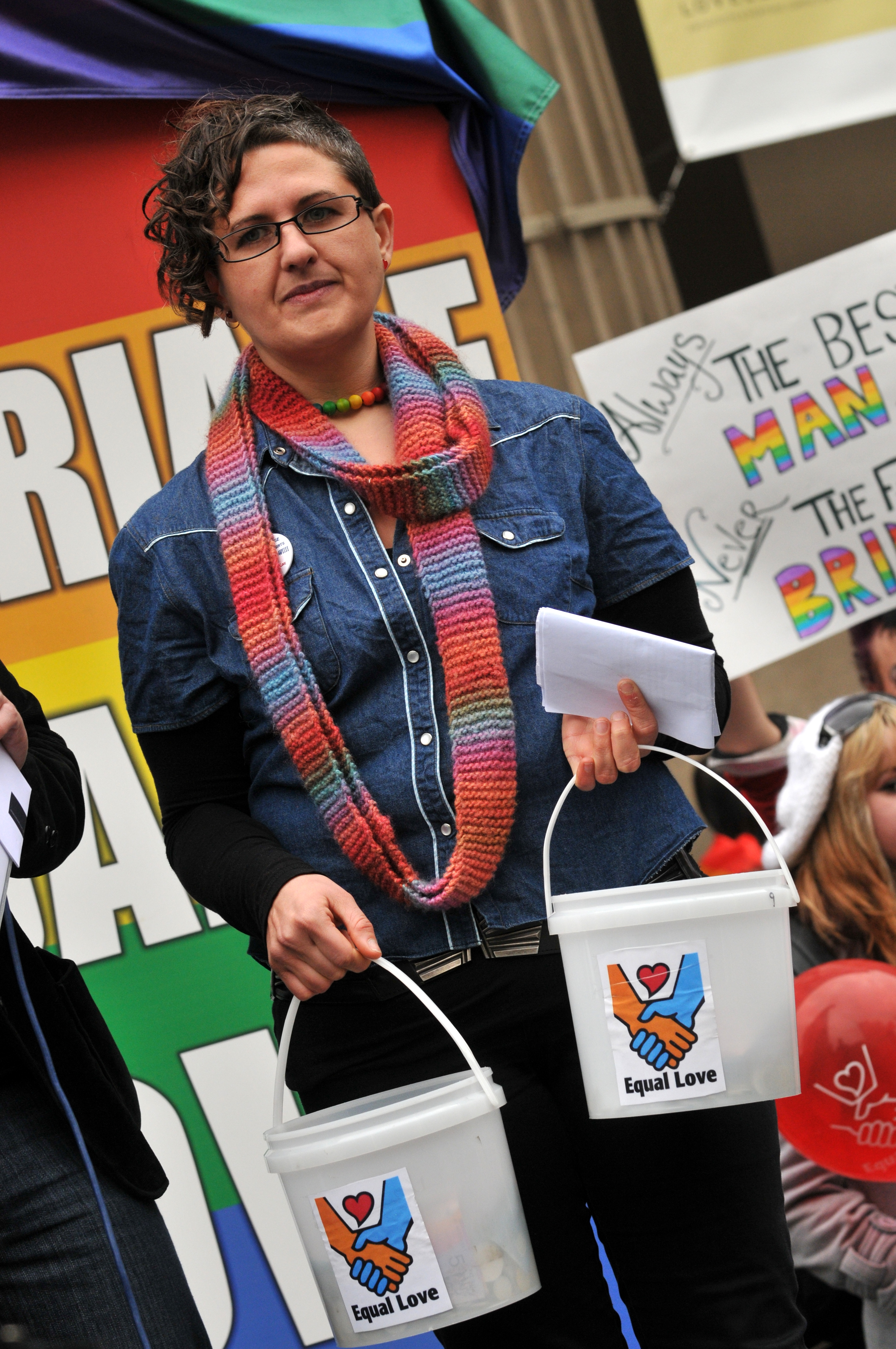
Equal Love convenor Ali Hogg at the August 2011 rally in Melbourne

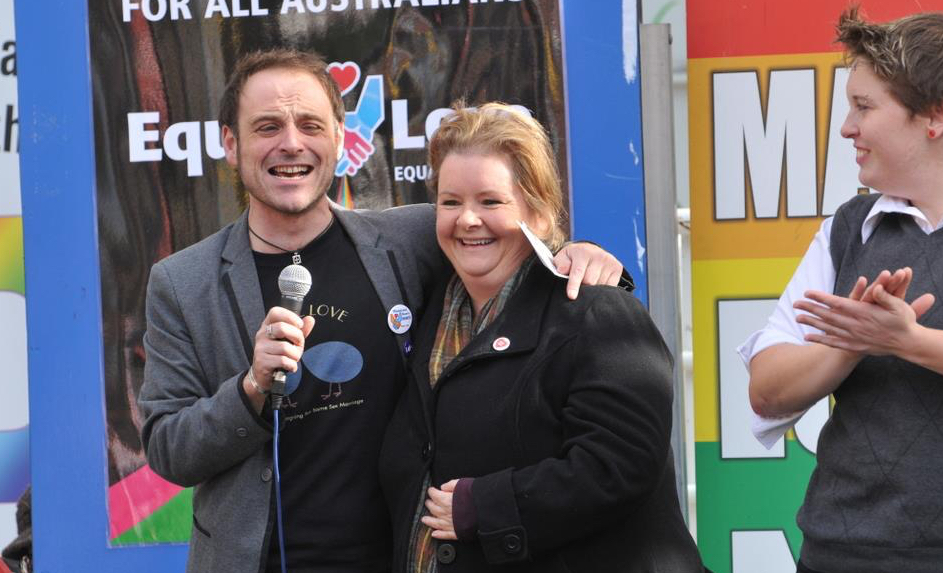
Equal Love campaign co-ordinator Anthony Wallace with Australian actor Magda Szubanski

In 2010, Equal Love won an ALSO Foundation award in the category of "Most Outstanding Community Campaign or Initiative" in the Australian LGBT community. The ALSO Foundation is Victoria's largest not-for-profit LGBT community organisation. Equal Love's Convener, Ali Hogg, won an ALSO award the same year as the "Most Outstanding Volunteer" for her work in the campaign. In 2011, Hogg was recognised in the "Absolut People's Choice" award as the country's most influential LGBT person for her work in Equal Love, as part of Same Same's "25 Most Influential LGBTI Australians". Equal Love were critical of former Australian Prime Minister Julia Gillard's position on same-sex marriage voting against the party policy change and against it becoming a binding vote and allowing members a conscience vote.

In 2016 Equal Love and Australian Marriage Equality led the pride parade in St Kilda Victoria; this was the first time both groups had united to demand same-sex marriage. Equal Love criticises Prime Minister Malcolm Turnbull with Wallace saying "he’s done us a lot of damage because he’s taken a vote off the table and said the way forward is a plebiscite".

== Criticism ==
Melbourne is the countries largest Equal Love movement but each state and territory manage their own activisms. The Brisbane campaign group has been criticised from within its own ranks, as well as by the wider LGBT community. The criticism has included concern about the close links Equal Love has to both the Socialist Alternative and the Socialist Alliance. The incorporation of other protest-issues within Equal Love rallies, as well as the "offensive" signs, the tee-shirt "profanity", along with the militancy of Equal Love participants have all raised concerns. Equal Love works with other Australian LGBTIQ groups including the Community Action Against Homophobia. Rodney Croome, national convener of Australian Marriage Equality, has expressed concerns about radical campaigning methods, saying "It is also a double standard to demand respect for same-sex relationships without showing the same respect in return".

== National supporters ==
- Amnesty International
- Australian Democrats
- Australian Coalition for Equality
- Australian Education Union
- Australian Greens
- Australian Marriage Equality
- Australian Services Union
- Comeout
- Communications, Electrical and Plumbing Union of Australia
- Community and Public Sector Union
- Council of Australian Postgraduate Associations
- Democratic Socialist Perspective
- Finance Sector Union
- Freedom Socialist Party
- Gaydar
- Green Left Weekly
- Human Rights Council of Australia
- Liquor, Hospitality and Miscellaneous Union
- National Tertiary Education Union
- National Union of Students
- Parents and Friends of Lesbians and Gays
- Rainbow Labor
- Same Same
- Socialist Alliance
- Socialist Alternative
- Young Australian Democrats

== Rallies ==
- 2010 Australian gender equality rallies

== See also ==
- LGBT rights in Australia
- List of LGBT rights organisations
