= Community Action Against Homophobia =

Community activist organisation based in Sydney, Australia

CAAH Logo

Community Action Against Homophobia (CAAH) is a community activist organisation founded in 1999. It is based in Sydney, Australia and aimed to eliminate homophobia and promote equality for queer people.

== Campaigns ==
=== Equal relationship recognition ===
CAAH's campaign for equal relationship recognition is an all-inclusive campaign for equality. While some organisations concentrate on a single model of relationship recognition, CAAH demands that all choices be available to all people regardless of their sexuality or gender. This includes de facto relationships, civil unions, and marriage. Together with Australian Marriage Equality and Equal Love, CAAH organises the annual Same Sex Marriage National Day of Action in Sydney on the weekend closest to the anniversary of the same sex ban passed on Black Friday, 13 August 2005.

CAAH was instrumental in the successful Marriage Equality Campaign and was pivotal in calling the protests of up to 50 000 people in Sydney in 2017. These protests were crucial as they pressured the then Liberal government to call a referendum, which resulted in more than 61% of Australians voting "yes".

=== Queer refugees ===
CAAH supports people who faced homophobia and persecution in their home countries because of their sexuality and/or gender, and as a result seek asylum in Australia. These asylum seekers are imprisoned by the Australian government in detention centres such as Villawood Immigration Detention Centre.

=== Greens anti-discrimination amendment ===
CAAH also supports Lee Rhiannon's private members' bill that would amend New South Wales anti-discrimination legislation. Currently, private schools and businesses with fewer than six employees are permitted to discriminate on sexuality, disability, gender or age. Lee Rhiannon's bill would remove the special exemptions for private schools and businesses employing fewer than six people.

== Criticism ==
CAAH undertakes campaigns in conjunction with the Equal Love and Australian Marriage Equality organisations. CAAH have been criticised for their radical slogans and campaigning methods. Rodney Croome, National Convener of Australian Marriage Equality, has expressing his concerns on this issue, saying, "It is also a double standard to demand respect for same-sex relationships without showing the same respect in return". A previous Co-convenor of CAAH has also strongly expressed his concern.

== See also ==
- Australian Marriage Equality
- Equal Love
- LGBT rights in Australia
- List of LGBT rights organizations
