= Toonen v. Australia =

Court case

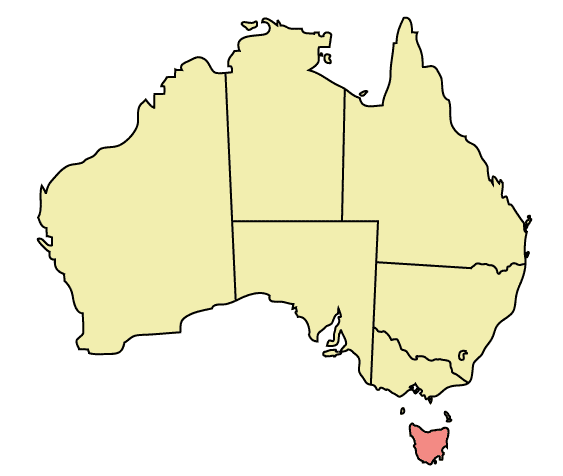
Map of Australia highlighting the location of Tasmania

Toonen v. Australia was a landmark human rights complaint brought before the United Nations Human Rights Committee (UNHRC) by Tasmanian resident Nicholas Toonen in 1994. The case resulted in the repeal of Australia's last sodomy laws when the Committee held that sexual orientation was included in the antidiscrimination provisions as a protected status under the International Covenant on Civil and Political Rights (ICCPR).

In 1991, Toonen complained to the Human Rights Committee that Tasmanian laws criminalising consensual sex between adult males in private were a violation of his right to privacy under Article 17 of ICCPR; distinguished between people on the basis of sexual activity, sexual orientation and identity in violation of Article 26; and meant that gay men in Tasmania were unequal before the law.

As a result of his complaint, Toonen lost his job as General Manager of the Tasmanian AIDS Council, because the Tasmanian Government threatened to withdraw the council's funding unless Toonen was fired. On 31 March 1994, the Committee agreed that, because of Tasmania's law, Australia was in breach of the obligations under the treaty. In response, the Commonwealth Government passed a law overriding Tasmania's criminalization of gay sex, Australia's last sodomy laws. The Toonen decision has subsequently been referenced by the committee and by other treaty bodies in making rulings.

== Sodomy laws in Australia ==
Australia inherited the United Kingdom's sodomy laws on white colonisation after 1788. These were retained in the criminal codes passed by the various colonial parliaments during the 19th century, and by the state parliaments after Federation.

Following the Wolfenden report, the Dunstan Labor government in South Australia introduced a "consenting adults in private" defence in 1972. This defence was initiated as a bill by Murray Hill, father of former Defence Minister Robert Hill, and repealed the state's sodomy law in 1975. The Campaign Against Moral Persecution during the 1970s raised the profile and acceptance of Australia's gay and lesbian communities, and other states and territories repealed their laws between 1976 and 1990. The exceptions were Tasmania and Queensland.

Male homosexuality (i.e., sodomy) was decriminalised in South Australia in 1975, and in the Australian Capital Territory in 1976, followed by Victoria in 1980, and New South Wales and the Northern Territory in 1984. In December 1989, Western Australia similarly decriminalised private sexual acts between males by passing the Law Reform (Decriminalisation of Sodomy) Act 1989, which went into effect in March 1990. The states and territories that retained different ages of consent or other vestiges of sodomy laws later began to repeal them: Western Australia did so in 2002, and New South Wales and the Northern Territory did so in 2003. Tasmania decriminalised sodomy in 1997 following the High Court case Croome v. Tasmania.

== Background to the case ==
In 1991, Nicholas Toonen, a gay activist, challenged two provisions of the Tasmanian Criminal Code: Sections 122(a) and (c), and 123, which criminalized all forms of sexual contact between consenting adult men in private, arguing that their continued existence in the Criminal Code of Tasmania had a profound and harmful impact on many Tasmanian people by fueling discrimination, harassment, and violence against gay and lesbian Tasmanians.

According to Toonen's submission to the committee, the laws:

empower Tasmanian police officers to investigate intimate aspects of his private life and to detain him, if they have reason to believe that he is involved in sexual activities which contravene the above sections. He adds that the Director of Public Prosecutions announced, in August 1988, that proceedings pursuant to Sections 122(a), (c) and 123 would be initiated if there was sufficient evidence of the commission of a crime.

Although in practice the Tasmanian police had not charged anyone under Section 122 with "unnatural sexual intercourse" or "intercourse against nature", or under Section 123 with "indecent practice between male persons" for several years, Toonen argued that because of his high-profile activism, his activities as an HIV/AIDS worker, and his long-term relationship with another man, his private life and liberty were threatened by the continued existence of these laws. He additionally argued that the laws restricted him from "openly exposing his sexuality" and publicizing his views on law reform as this would have been "prejudicial to his employment", contending that the Sections "created the conditions for discrimination in employment, constant stigmatization, vilification, threats of physical violence and the violation of basic democratic rights."

Toonen further complained that Tasmanian "figures of authority" (such as members of the Lower House of Parliament; municipal councillors; clergy and the general public) were known to openly make derogatory remarks about gays and lesbians, including statements such as "representatives of the gay community are no better than Saddam Hussein"; "the act of homosexuality is unacceptable in any society, let alone a civilized society"; and "you are 15 times more likely to be murdered by a homosexual than a heterosexual". Some had further suggested that all Tasmanian homosexuals should be exiled to an uninhabited island or be subjected to compulsory sterilization. This, claimed Toonen, constituted a "campaign of official and unofficial hatred" against gays and lesbians, and made it difficult for the Tasmanian Gay Law Reform Group to disseminate information about its activities and advocate the decriminalization of homosexuality.

== Complaint ==
Toonen alleged that Sections 122 (a) and (c) and 123 of the Tasmanian Criminal Code violated articles 2(1), 17 and 26 of the International Covenant on Civil and Political Rights because:

(a) they do not distinguish between sexual activity in private and sexual activity in public and bring private activity into the public domain. In their enforcement, these provisions result in a violation of the right to privacy, since they enable the police to enter a household on the mere suspicion that two consenting adult homosexual men may be committing a criminal offence. Given the stigma attached to homosexuality in Australian society (and especially in Tasmania), the violation of the right to privacy may lead to unlawful attacks on the honour and the reputation of the individuals concerned.

(b) they distinguish between individuals in the exercise of their right to privacy on the basis of sexual activity, sexual orientation and sexual identity, and

(c) the Tasmanian Criminal Code does not outlaw any form of homosexual activity between consenting homosexual women in private and only some forms of consenting heterosexual activity between adult men and women in private. That the laws in question are not currently enforced by the judicial authorities of Tasmania should not be taken to mean that homosexual men in Tasmania enjoy effective equality under the law.

The remedy requested by Toonen was the repeal of these provisions.

== Decision regarding admissibility of the complaint ==
In considering the admissibility of the complaint, the Committee determined that the author (Toonen) could be deemed a victim within the meaning of article 1 of the Optional Protocol, and that his claims were admissible ratione temporis (within the temporal jurisdiction of the committee). The communication was declared admissible on 5 November 1992.

== Australian federal and state response ==
In its response, the federal government of Australia conceded that Toonen had been a victim of arbitrary interference with his privacy, that he was personally and actually affected by the laws challenged by him, and that the laws could not be justified on public health or moral grounds, but noted that the government of Tasmania denied that he had been the victim of a violation of the Covenant. The federal government noted that, while the state pointed out that no prosecutions or investigations had been made under the relevant Sections since 1984, the risk of prosecution or investigation remained.

The government of Tasmania argued that the retention of the Sections in question was justified and partly motivated by an effort to stem the spread of HIV/AIDS in the state, and that the laws were further justified on moral grounds; the federal government did not accept either claim, noting that laws against homosexuality in all other parts of Australia had been repealed, and that discrimination on the basis of sexuality was unlawful in three of six Australian states and the two self-governing internal Australian territories.

The federal government requested the committee's guidance in interpreting whether sexual orientation could be subsumed under the term "... or other status" in article 26, requiring examination of the issues of:

- whether Tasmanian laws drew a distinction on the basis of sex or sexual orientation;
- whether Toonen was a victim of discrimination;
- whether there were reasonable and objective criteria for the distinction; and
- whether Tasmanian laws were a proportional means to achieve a legitimate aim under the Covenant.

== Decision ==
The Committee found that adult consensual sexual activity in private is covered by the concept of "privacy", and that Toonen was affected by the continued existence of the Tasmanian laws, which continuously and directly interfered with his privacy, despite their lack of recent enforcement.

The Committee noted that "the criminalization of homosexual practices cannot be considered a reasonable means or proportionate measure to achieve the aim of preventing the spread of AIDS/HIV", further noting that "The Australian Government observes that statutes criminalizing homosexual activity tend to impede public health programmes by driving underground many of the people at the risk of infection."

The Committee found that the Sections did not meet the "reasonableness" test in the circumstances of the case, and that they arbitrarily interfered with Toonen's right under article 17, paragraph 1.

As regards the guidance sought by the Australian government as to whether sexual orientation may be considered an "other status" for the purposes of article 26, the Committee found the reference to "sex" in article 26 is to be taken as including sexual orientation.

The Human Rights Committee therefore found that the facts before it revealed a violation of articles 17, paragraph 1, juncto 2, paragraph 1, of the Covenant. The author was entitled to a remedy under article 2(3)(a) of the Covenant, and the opinion of the committee was that an effective remedy would be the repeal of Sections 122(a), (c) and 123 of the Tasmanian Criminal Code, and requested a response from the Federal government in 90 days.

=== Appendix to the decision ===
Committee member Bertil Wennergren submitted an appendix to the decision, in which he disagreed with the committee's view that it was unnecessary to consider whether there had also been a violation of article 26 of the Covenant. In his opinion, a finding of a violation of article 17, paragraph 1, should rather have been deduced from a finding of violation of article 26.

Wennergren argued that the criminalization of certain behaviours under Sections 122(a), (c) and 123 of the Tasmanian Criminal Code must be considered incompatible with article 26 of the Covenant (a) made a distinction between heterosexuals and homosexuals, and (b) criminalized sexual contacts between consenting men without at the same time criminalizing such contacts between consenting women, thereby setting aside the principle of equality before the law, in violation of article 26:

The discriminatory criminal legislation at issue here is not strictly speaking "unlawful" but it is incompatible with the Covenant, as it limits the right to equality before the law. In my view, the criminalization operating under Sections 122 and 123 of the Tasmanian Criminal Code interferes with privacy to an unjustifiable extent and, therefore, also constitutes a violation of article 17, paragraph 1 ... I share the Committee's opinion that an effective remedy would be the repeal of Sections 122(a), (c) and 123, of the Tasmanian Criminal Code.

== Result ==
In response to the Tasmanian Parliament's refusal to repeal the offending laws, the Federal government passed the Human Rights (Sexual Conduct) Act 1994, legalising sexual activity between consenting adults throughout Australia and prohibiting the making of laws that arbitrarily interfere with the sexual conduct of adults in private. In 1997 in the case of Croome v Tasmania, Croome applied to the High Court of Australia for a ruling as to whether the Tasmanian laws were inconsistent with the Federal Human Rights (Sexual Conduct) Act. The Tasmanian Government repealed the relevant Criminal Code provisions after failing in its attempts to have the matter struck out.

According to Nick Poynder in a public lecture presented at Monash University's Castan Centre for Human Rights Law in Melbourne on 28 April 2003, the committee's views are "widely published and carry significant moral and persuasive authority":

There is no doubt ... that the UNHRC's views in Toonen v Australia, that Tasmania's anti-homosexual laws were in breach of Article 17 of the ICCPR ... led directly to the enactment by the Australian Parliament of legislation rendering those laws ineffective.

According to Justice Michael Kirby, in a speech given on the 2004 bicentenary of Tasmania, the changes in law resulted in Tasmania becoming "one of the most enlightened" Australian states:

Early leadership was given by the Tasmania Police. It was followed by the Health Department, concerned to respond strongly to HIV/AIDS. An education reference group was established to turn around earlier policy and to combat homophobia in Tasmanian schools. Soon a programme was instituted to remove sexuality discrimination entirely from Tasmanian law and official practice. Tourism Tasmania even dedicated resources to promoting the State as a place friendly to gay visitors. For those who knew the whole history, this was truly a story of amazing Tasmania. Whereas in 1988, support for decriminalisation of homosexuality in this State had been 15% below the national average, by the time decriminalisation occurred in 1997, it was 15% above the average. Indeed, it was reportedly higher in Hobart than in Melbourne or Sydney.

This case law Toonen v. Australia is also referred to by the Declaration of Montreal, and a report of UN High Commissioner for Human Rights on sexual orientation and gender identity.
