= Ralph McLean (politician) =

Australian politician

Malcolm Ross (Ralph) McLean (26 March 1957 – 25 December 2010) was an Australian politician, who served as mayor of Fitzroy, Victoria in 1984 and 1985. He was the first openly gay person ever elected as a mayor in Australia.

Born in 1957 in Kilmore, he was educated at Melbourne University. He worked as a research officer for the Australian Union of Students, and was a member of the Melbourne Historical Journal collective.

He came out as gay to his family in 1979. First elected to Fitzroy Council in 1982 as a Labor Party councillor, he came out publicly as gay during his mayoral campaign in 1984 and won the election.

Following his term as mayor of Fitzroy, he remained active in Melbourne's arts and cultural community, including five years as chairman of the Melbourne Fringe Festival board, four years as chairman of C31 Melbourne, and a stint as executive director of the Australian Federation of AIDS Organisations.

He died in December 2010 of liver failure. In 2014, the City of Yarra, the successor government to Fitzroy, unveiled a public monument to the city's LGBT community which was dedicated in part to McLean.
