= Unnamed Desires =

2015 book by Rebecca Jennings

Unnamed Desires: A Sydney Lesbian History
- Author: Rebecca Jennings
- Subject: History of lesbianism in Sydney
- Genre: Non-fiction
- Publisher: Monash University Press
- Publication date: 20/9/2015
- Publication place: Australia
- Pages: 176
- Awards: Shortlisted for the 2016 New South Wales Premier's History Awards
- ISBN: 9781922235701

Unnamed Desires: A Sydney Lesbian History is a 2015 non-fiction book by Rebecca Jennings. Jennings, currently a Professor of Modern Gender History at University College London, is a scholar of twentieth-century lesbian history. Unnamed Desires was her third book and was published by Monash University Press in 2015. The book traces the history of lesbianism in Sydney between the 1930s and late 1970s.

== Summary ==
Jennings relies largely on oral histories to document lesbian history in Sydney between the 1930s and 1970s. She argues that, contrary to the "myth of acceptance", there was a powerful silencing of lesbianism in Australia until the late 1970s. While gay men were openly prosecuted, lesbianism was nonetheless widely constituted as unacceptable through methods of silencing. Jennings begins by describing the emergence of lesbian social networks and subcultures in the post-war decades. In the final chapters, she describes the emergence of lesbian activism in the 1970s, and the fissures that emerged both between lesbians and gay men within the LGBT movement, and between lesbians and straight women within the women's movement.

== Reception ==
The book received positive reviews in academic journals including the Journal of the History of Sexuality, the Journal of Australian Studies, Australian Feminist Studies, the Melbourne Historical Journal, and History Australia. The book was reviewed by Sylvia Martin for Australian Book Review and by Graham Willett for the Sydney Morning Herald. Reviewers praised Jennings for bringing light to an understudied part of Australian history, and for her use of "silence" as a theoretical framework.

== Awards ==
Awards for Unnamed Desires
Year	Award	Result	Ref.
2016	New South Wales Premier's History Awards	Shortlisted	
