= Marriage Equality (Same Sex) Act 2013 =

Former Australian Capital Territory legislation

ACT Legislative Assembly
- Long title: An Act to provide for marriage equality by allowing for marriage between 2 adults of the same sex, and for other purposes
- Citation: A2013-39
- Territorial extent: Australian Capital Territory
- Passed by: Legislative Assembly
- Passed: 22 October 2013
- Enacted: 4 November 2013
- Commenced: 7 November 2013 (Weddings held from 7 December 2013)
- Struck down: 12 December 2013

Struck down by
- High Court of Australia; The Commonwealth v Australian Capital Territory [2013] HCA 55, (2013) 250 CLR 441.
- Status: Struck down

The Marriage Equality (Same Sex) Act 2013 was an act of parliament of the Australian Capital Territory Legislative Assembly that was intended to legalise same-sex marriage in the ACT. It was first presented to the ACT Legislative Assembly on 19 September 2013 by the ACT Attorney-General, Simon Corbell. The law intended to build on the existing recognition of same-sex unions in the Australian Capital Territory, which included recognition of de facto partners, civil partnerships and same-sex-only civil unions (with civil unions being replaced by same-sex marriage if the act was successfully passed). The act was passed in the Legislative Assembly on 22 October 2013. It came into operation on 7 November although wedding ceremonies under the provisions of the act did not occur until 7 December 2013.

Alan Wright (Player) and Joel Player were the first same-sex couple to marry under the new laws. Upon the law's commencement, the Abbott government challenged the legal and constitutional validity of the act, lodging an immediate challenge in the High Court of Australia. The case was heard on 3 December and a ruling was handed down on 12 December 2013. The High Court unanimously struck the act down in its entirety, on the basis that it was in conflict with the federal Marriage Act 1961, which defined marriage in Australia as the union of a man and a woman. The court did however expressly confirm in its ruling that the Parliament of Australia had the constitutional authority to amend the definition of marriage in the Marriage Act, so as to allow same-sex couples to marry.

== History of the act ==
The bill was presented to the Assembly as the Marriage Equality Bill 2013 and was supported by all eight members of the Labor Party in the ACT and by Greens MLA Shane Rattenbury. It was, however, opposed by all eight members of the Liberal Opposition, who argued that same-sex marriage should be dealt with by the Federal Parliament only.

The bill was introduced into the Assembly on 19 September 2013 by the Attorney-General Simon Corbell. In his speech to the Assembly introducing the bill, Corbell stated:

- Everyone has the right to enjoy his or her human rights without distinction or discrimination of any kind.
- Everyone is equal before the law and is entitled to the equal protection of the law without discrimination.
- Everyone has the right to equal and effective protection against discrimination on any ground.

The ACT Government later retitled the bill as the "Marriage Equality (Same Sex) Bill", with the aim of further distinguishing it from the definition of "marriage" in the federal Marriage Act. Further proposed amendments to the bill that would have created a separate institution of marriage for same-sex couples were rejected by the ACT Government.

On 22 October 2013, the ACT Legislative Assembly passed the bill by a vote of 9–8. All members of the Labor government and the one Greens member (Shane Rattenbury) voted in favour of the bill and all eight Liberal Party members voted against the bill. The passing of the bill represents the first time any Australian state, territory or federal legislature had passed legislation allowing same-sex marriage.

Details of 2013 Legislative Assembly vote to allow same-sex marriage

Marriage Equality (Same Sex) Bill 2013 – Second Reading
Party	Votes for	Votes against
Labor (8)	8: Andrew Barr; Yvette Berry; Chris Bourke; Joy Burch; Simon Corbell; Katy Gallagher; Mick Gentleman; Mary Porter	–
Liberal (8)	–	8: Alistair Coe; Steve Doszpot; Vicki Dunne; Jeremy Hanson; Giulia Jones; Nicole Lawder; Brendan Smyth; Andrew Wall
Greens (1)	1: Shane Rattenbury	–
Total	9	8

The act defined the scope of eligibility for a marriage in Part 2, stating that eligibility for marriage applies "in relation to all marriages between 2 adults of the same sex that are not marriages with the meaning of the [federal] Marriage Act".

The act was notified in the ACT Legislation Register on 4 November 2013. The following day the Attorney-General issued the commencement notice, effective 7 November 2013. It was at that point same-sex couples could officially notify of their intention to marry, allowing them to arrange weddings commencing 7 December 2013.

== Commonwealth challenge to the act ==
The ACT is a self-governing Territory, operating under federal legislation, the Australian Capital Territory (Self-Government) Act 1988 (Cth). Section 28(1) of this act provides that legislation by the ACT Legislative Assembly will have "no effect to the extent that it is inconsistent with" a federal law, although it "shall be taken to be consistent with such a law to the extent that it is capable of operating concurrently with that law".

Section 51 of the Constitution of Australia provides the federal parliament with power to make laws with respect simply to "marriage". In conventional terms of constitutional interpretation, one view can be that this is confined to different-sex marriage because that was all that the constitutional framers had in mind, while another view can be that "marriage" should be understood in terms of current public perceptions. Under this power, the federal parliament has enacted a uniform marriage law for the whole of Australia, the Marriage Act 1961 (Cth). As enacted, this act appeared to envisage only different-sex marriage. However, to avoid doubt it was amended in 2004 to include in its interpretation section (section 5) a definition of "marriage" as "the union of a man and a woman to the exclusion of all others, voluntarily entered into for life".

The Parliament shall, subject to this Constitution, have power to make laws for the peace, order, and good government of the Commonwealth with respect to:

[...]
(xxi) Marriage; — Section 51, Constitution of Australia

The marriage power, as with most of the federal parliament's legislative powers, is held concurrently with the states. In fact, marriage was regulated mainly by the states until the federal Marriage Act 1961 introduced uniform marriage law for the whole of Australia. However, it arguably remained unclear whether the Marriage Act "covers the field" of the topic "marriage", leaving no space for a state or a self-governing territory to make laws with respect to marriage of any kind.

Already on 10 October, Commonwealth Attorney-General George Brandis stated that, if the ACT's bill were passed, the Commonwealth would challenge it in the High Court of Australia as inconsistent with the federal Marriage Act. That is to say it would be "inconsistent" with a federal law in terms of section 28(1) of the Australian Capital Territory (Self-Government) Act 1988. If the Commonwealth were to lose in the High Court, it retained the option of introducing federal legislation to override the ACT act. However, the federal government could not have been confident that such legislation would pass, since it had a majority only in the House of Representatives and not in the Senate.

Inconsistency with other laws

(1) A provision of an enactment has no effect to the extent that it is inconsistent with a law defined by subsection (2), but such a provision shall be taken to be consistent with such a law to the extent that it is capable of operating concurrently with that law. — Section 28, Australian Capital Territory (Self-Government) Act 1988

Following this, ACT Chief Minister Katy Gallagher maintained that the ACT had every legal right to pass the bill and allow same-sex marriage in the ACT. Shane Rattenbury and Labor Party MLAs released similar statements affirming their support for the bill. Australian Greens Senator Sarah Hanson-Young stated that their party would do whatever it could in the Senate to stop any federal legislation that would override the ACT act.

== In the High Court: Commonwealth v ACT (2013) ==
Commonwealth v ACT (Same-sex marriage case)
- Court: High Court of Australia
- Decided: 12 December 2013
- Citations: [2013] HCA 55, (2013) 250 CLR 441
- Transcript: [2013] HCATrans 299 (3 December 2013)

Court membership
- Judges sitting: French CJ, Hayne, Crennan, Kiefel, Bell & Keane JJ

Case opinions
- The Marriage Equality (Same Sex) Act 2013 (ACT) was invalid as inconsistent with the Marriage Act 1961 (Cth)

On 22 October 2013, as soon as the ACT had passed the bill, the Commonwealth government requested a High Court hearing regarding the validity of this law. Following several directions hearings in the High Court, Chief Justice Robert French announced that the full bench of the Court would hear the Commonwealth's challenge in a two-day hearing on 3 and 4 December 2013.

=== Submissions ===
On 13 November, the Commonwealth provided the High Court with its written submission, which argued that the ACT's law was "inconsistent", in terms of the Australian Capital Territory (Self-Government) Act 1988 (Cth), with the Marriage Act 1961 (Cth) and Family Law Act 1975 (Cth).

The [Commonwealth] Marriage Act simply does not permit of the possibility that a State or Territory might clothe with the legal status of marriage (or a form of marriage) a union of these kinds. It leaves no room for a State or Territory legislature to create a status of 'bigamous marriage', 'polygamous marriage', 'arranged involuntary marriage' or 'trial marriage'. Similarly, within and by reason of the schema of the Marriage Act, couples who are not man and woman (whether same-sex or intersex) are and must remain for the purposes of Australian law 'unmarried' persons. They remain on that side of the binary divide.

On 25 November, the ACT provided its written submission to the court, arguing in response to the Commonwealth that "neither the Marriage Act 1961 (Cth) nor the Family Law Act 1975 (Cth) manifest an intention to be an exhaustive or exclusive statement of the [Australian] law governing the institution of marriage".

The case was heard by a six-judge bench, on 3 December.

=== Judgment ===
The court delivered its judgment very quickly, on 12 December. It held unanimously (7–0) that the whole of the ACT's same-sex marriage act was "inconsistent" with the federal Marriage Act 1961 and "of no effect".

The inconsistency identified was twofold. First, the definition of "marriage" in the ACT act was inconsistent with that in the Marriage Act. Second, the ACT act could not nevertheless operate concurrently with the Marriage Act, since the Marriage Act was intended to be "a comprehensive and exhaustive statement of the law with respect to the creation and recognition of the legal status of marriage". That exhaustiveness extended to the definition of marriage; the court did not accept the ACT's contention that the Marriage Act left room for same-sex marriage simply because it did not expressly exclude it. Nor did the court accept the ACT's contention that the Marriage Act and the ACT act "do not regulate the same status of 'marriage'". After all, the court observed, "as both the short title and the long title to the ACT act show, the act is intended to provide for marriage equality". The court then found it unnecessary to consider inconsistency with the Family Law Act 1975. It required the ACT to pay the Commonwealth's costs.

The court did not spell it out, but the consequence of this decision is not that the ACT act is void. Rather, the act is "of no effect" or, as the court adds, "inoperative". The court is using the language of its established interpretation of section 109 of the Constitution, which provides that a state law will be "invalid" to the extent that it is "inconsistent" with a federal law. The court has understood "invalid" in section 109 to mean not that the state law is simply void but that it is "inoperative" for so long as the inconsistency remains; if that federal law were to be changed so as to remove the inconsistency, the state law would revive. The words "of no effect" in section 28(1) of the ACT self-government act appear to reflect that. The addition of concurrent operation (which is not in Constitution section 109) does not create an exception to inconsistency as such, but specifies a circumstance in which inconsistency will not arise. The court found that, regarding the ACT's same-sex marriage act, this circumstance did not arise.

When a law of a State is inconsistent with a law of the Commonwealth, the latter shall prevail, and the former shall, to the extent of the inconsistency, be invalid. — Section 109, Constitution of Australia

That was sufficient to dispose of the case and the High Court is normally reluctant to determine an issue that does not need to be determined. To have stopped at that point, however, would have left the Commonwealth, the ACT and the states that have been contemplating same-sex marriage legislation in limbo as to what they might do next. One option would have been for a state to enact same-sex marriage legislation and wait for it to be challenged in the High Court—probably, as had happened with the ACT act, after marriages under that legislation had already taken place. For these reasons, it would seem, the court proceeded to decide whether the marriage power, Constitution s 51(xxi), extends to same-sex marriage.

All parties to the case had agreed that the marriage power extends to same-sex marriage. The court did not consider itself constrained by that agreement, but it came to the same view.

The court rejected the conventional options in constitutional interpretation:

The utility of adopting or applying a single all-embracing theory of constitutional interpretation has been denied. This case does not require examination of those theories or the resolution of any conflict, real or supposed, between them. The determinative question in this case is whether s 51(xxi) is to be construed as referring only to the particular legal status of "marriage" which could be formed at the time of federation (having the legal content which it had according to English law at that time) or as using the word "marriage" in the sense of a "topic of juristic classification". For the reasons that follow, the latter construction should be adopted. Debates cast in terms like "originalism" or "original intent" (evidently intended to stand in opposition to "contemporary meaning") with their echoes of very different debates in other jurisdictions are not to the point and serve only to obscure much more than they illuminate. (Note: The reference to "other jurisdictions" would be primarily to the USA.)

Thus the word "marriage" in Constitution section 51(xxi) states a "topic of juristic classification" which is not tied to any historical model and the federal parliament can legislate as it wishes within that topic. In the court's view, same-sex marriage comes within the topic.

=== Consequences ===
The court did not refer to the several same-sex marriage ceremonies that had already taken place. However, the court made it clear that, since the ACT act had never been of any effect and the Marriage Act is exhaustive, the only type of marriage that can be contracted in Australia was and is that provided in the Marriage Act. It follows that those ceremonies could not have created marriages.

There can now be uniform federal law for marriages of any kind. The most direct way to achieve that is to amend the Marriage Act, to provide that a person's sex is not a criterion of eligibility to marry. The Marriage Act would retain its exclusivity, so that no state or territory would be able to legislate about marriage of any kind. Owing to that exclusivity, the ACT same-sex marriage act would remain inconsistent with the Marriage Act and, consequently, continue to be of no effect.

Due to the fact the court's ruling held the Marriage Equality (Same Sex) Act 2013 to be of no effect, the act is regarded as being "impliedly repealed", despite having never been repealed by the Legislative Assembly.

== Aftermath ==
After the Marriage Amendment (Definition and Religious Freedoms) Act 2017 (Cth) was passed, the ACT Government offered free marriage certificates for couples who married there under the Marriage Equality (Same Sex) Act 2013 (ACT).

== See also ==
- Australian Marriage Equality
- LGBT rights in the Australian Capital Territory
- Same-sex marriage in Australia
