= Same-sex marriage in the Australian Capital Territory =

Same-sex marriage has been legal in the Australian Capital Territory (ACT), and in the rest of Australia, since 9 December 2017 following passage in the Parliament of the Marriage Amendment (Definition and Religious Freedoms) Act 2017. The ACT is unique in being the only state or territory in Australia to have independently passed a same-sex marriage law. In October 2013, the Legislative Assembly approved the Marriage Equality (Same Sex) Act 2013. The Abbott government immediately challenged the law in the High Court of Australia. The court struck down the legislation on 12 December 2013, determining that marriage is an exclusive power of the Commonwealth and no state or territory law creating any other type of marriage could operate concurrently with the Marriage Act 1961. The 31 same-sex marriages that had been performed under the ACT legislation were consequently voided.

The ACT was the first jurisdiction in Australia to legally recognise same-sex couples, following passage of the Domestic Relationships Act 1994. It was the second to allow joint adoption petitions by same-sex couples in 2004, following Western Australia. It was also the first jurisdiction to allow civil unions after its Civil Unions Act passed the Legislative Assembly in 2012.

== Domestic partnerships ==
The first legislation to officially recognise same-sex couples in the Australian Capital Territory was the Domestic Relationships Act 1994. This law provided for distribution of property and finances in the event of separation, and inheritance in the event of death. In 2003 and 2004, the government of Chief Minister Jon Stanhope introduced reforms to further equalise treatment for same-sex couples and same-sex families. These acts were the Legislation (Gay, Lesbian and Transgender) Amendment Act 2003, the Discrimination Amendment Act 2003, the Parentage Act 2004, the Sexuality Discrimination Legislation Amendment Act 2004. and the Human Rights Act 2004. These reforms introduced the definition of "domestic partnership" into numerous pieces of legislation, and allowed same-sex couples to adopt and be legally recognised as parents regardless of their gender or relationship status.

== Civil partnerships and unions ==
=== Early bills ===
Initially proposed in March 2006, the Civil Unions Bill 2006 was intended to established civil unions for same-sex and opposite-sex couples, providing equal legal recognition to marriage under territory law. Attorney-General Philip Ruddock said that the draft bill "[would] not satisfy the Commonwealth", which would intervene unless the bill was changed. The bill passed the Australian Capital Territory Legislative Assembly on 11 May 2006. After the law had come into force on 9 June 2006, Ruddock announced that the Commonwealth would move to overrule it. On 13 June 2006, the Federal Executive Council instructed Governor-General Michael Jeffery to disallow the Act. The Governor-General was provided with this power by the Australian Capital Territory (Self-Government) Act 1988; though this right would later be removed in 2011. The disallowance of the Civil Unions Act 2006 was heavily criticised by opposition parties and civil rights advocates, and on 15 June 2006 a motion was moved in the Australian Senate to overturn it and reinstate the legislation. This motion was defeated 30–32, with Coalition members voting against reinstating the law.

In December 2006, the government indicated that it would proceed with new legislation recognising same-sex civil partnerships, based on the United Kingdom partnership model. The Attorney-General of the Australian Capital Territory, Simon Corbell, stated, "It's still our intention to give the same level of recognition provided for in the Civil Unions Act." This second bill, the Civil Partnerships Bill 2006, replaced the term "civil union" with "civil partnership", but was essentially the same in its effect as the previous bill. It was blocked again in February 2007.

=== Civil Partnerships Act 2008 ===
In December 2007, following the 2007 federal election and the formation of a Labor government, discussions on reintroducing a revised civil partnership bill resurfaced. Unlike his predecessor John Howard, Prime Minister Kevin Rudd said that he would not override ACT legislation allowing civil unions because it was "a matter for states and territories". The Civil Partnerships Bill was introduced to the Legislative Assembly that same month, but quickly stalled. In February 2008, Attorney-General Robert McClelland responded to the proposed ACT legislation, saying that the Rudd government would not allow civil unions, and reiterated the Labor Party's preference for a system of state-based relationship registers, similar to Tasmania's model. McClelland said that "the ceremonial aspects of the ACT model were inappropriate." The Commonwealth Government was willing to accept state-based relationship registers so long as they did not "mimic marriage" by allowing a ceremony. McClelland's position was criticised by Senator Bob Brown of the Australian Greens, who called it "the ugly face of Labor conservatism." In May 2008, after several attempts to amend the scheme, Attorney-General Simon Corbell announced that the government had abandoned its civil partnership legislation, eliminated any ceremonial aspects, and settled for a system of relationship registers virtually identical to the ones operating in Tasmania and Victoria. The Commonwealth Government had not compromised at any point during negotiations. The legislation passed the Legislative Assembly on 8 May 2008, granting same-sex couples increased access to superannuation, taxation and social security law reforms. While legislative ceremonies were removed from the bill, an administrative ceremony may be performed by a representative of the ACT Register-General. The Civil Partnerships Act 2008 commenced on 19 May 2008.

The Civil Partnerships Amendment Bill 2009 was presented to the Legislative Assembly by the ACT Greens on 26 August 2009, allowing for ceremonies to be conducted with civil partnerships, which was the contentious item removed from the previous year's legislation. Labor initially accused the Greens of "playing politics" by resurrecting the issue, but unanimously backed the bill as a matter of principle as it was Labor Party policy to support civil unions. The bill was approved by legislators on 11 November after an amendment was inserted banning opposite-sex couples from having a civil partnership ceremony. This made the ACT the first territory in the country to legalise civil partnership ceremonies for same-sex couples. The Commonwealth Government threatened to void the legislation, but after discussions, Attorney-General McClelland said that the issue had been resolved satisfactorily.

The Civil Partnerships Act 2008 was subsequently repealed upon passage of the Civil Unions Act 2012; however, entering into civil partnerships, which are now regulated by the Domestic Relationships Act 1994, remains an option for same-sex and opposite-sex couples.

=== Civil Unions Act 2012 ===
On 22 August 2012, the Civil Unions Act 2012 passed the Legislative Assembly 11–6 following legal advice that the Commonwealth Government had removed its ability to legislate for territorial and state same-sex union laws after it defined marriage as only "between man and woman" in the Marriage Amendment Act 2004. The civil union law granted many of the same rights to same-sex couples as people married under the Marriage Act. The Act was not challenged by the Gillard government.

The Act was to have been repealed upon commencement of the Marriage Equality (Same Sex) Act 2013, which, had it not been struck down by the High Court, would have legalised same-sex marriage in the territory. Due to the High Court holding the ACT's same-sex marriage law to be invalid, the Civil Unions Act 2012 remained in force until 2017. From 9 December 2017, forming a new civil union is no longer possible as section 7 of the Act requires that potential couples be unable to marry under the Marriage Act 1961. When same-sex marriage was legalised, it became legally impossible to form a civil union, though existing ones remain valid. The government stated that civil unions performed prior to that date and not converted into marriages would remain valid.

== Same-sex marriage ==
=== Marriage Equality (Same Sex) Act 2013 ===
==== Passage and promulgation ====
On 13 September 2013, the government made the announcement that it would put forward a bill to legalise same-sex marriage, following a decade-long attempt to legislate in the area. "We've been pretty clear on this issue for some time now and there's overwhelming community support for this," said Chief Minister Katy Gallagher. "We would prefer to see the federal parliament legislate for a nationally consistent scheme, but in the absence of this we will act for the people of the ACT." The bill would have enabled couples unable to marry under the Marriage Act 1961 to enter into a marriage in the ACT, and would have provided for solemnisation, eligibility, dissolution and annulment, regulatory requirements and notice of intention in relation to same-sex marriages. The bill was debated in the Legislative Assembly on 22 October 2013, and passed by 9 votes to 8.

22 October 2013 vote in the Legislative Assembly
Party	Voted for	Voted against	Abstained
ACT Labor Party	8: Andrew Barr; Yvette Berry; Chris Bourke; Joy Burch; Simon Corbell; Katy Gallagher; Mick Gentleman; Mary Porter	–	–
Canberra Liberals	–	8: Alistair Coe; Steve Doszpot; Vicki Dunne; Jeremy Hanson; Giulia Jones; Nicole Lawder; Brendan Smyth; Andrew Wall	–
ACT Greens	1: Shane Rattenbury	–	–
Total	9	8	0
Total	52.9%	47.1%	0.0%

Under the Marriage Equality (Same Sex) Act 2013, same-sex marriages were allowed to be performed in the ACT from 7 December 2013. Couples were required to give a minimum one month's notice of intention to marry and 47 couples were eligible to marry in the period between 7 and 12 December, when the High Court struck down the law. The first couple to marry was Stephen Dawson, a member of the Western Australian Legislative Council, and his partner Dennis Liddelow in Canberra on 7 December 2013. In total, 31 same-sex couples elected to marry in the five-day period between the law's implementation and its subsequent annulment by the High Court.

The law also applied to the Jervis Bay Territory, although no same-sex couple is believed to have married there in the five-day period when same-sex marriage was legal. Authorities in the City of Shoalhaven said they had hoped the law would boost tourism.

==== Court challenge ====
Commonwealth v ACT
- Court: High Court of Australia
- Decided: 12 December 2013
- Citations: [2013] HCA 55, (2013) 250 CLR 441

Court membership
- Judges sitting: French CJ, Hayne, Crennan, Kiefel, Bell & Keane JJ

Case opinions
- The Marriage Equality (Same Sex) Act 2013 was invalid as inconsistent with the federal Marriage Act 1961

On 10 October 2013, Attorney-General George Brandis confirmed that the Commonwealth Government would challenge the law, stating that the Abbott government had significant constitutional concerns. The High Court of Australia heard the government's challenge on 3 December, less than one week prior to the legislation going into effect. On 13 November, the Commonwealth submitted to the court its written submission, which contained arguments in support of the supposed constitutional and legal invalidity of the ACT's law, stating that the law was "inconsistent" with the provisions of the Australian Capital Territory (Self-Government) Act 1988 and the federal Marriage Act. Solicitor-General Justin Gleeson submitted to the High Court that:

The [Commonwealth] Marriage Act simply does not permit of the possibility that a State or Territory might clothe with the legal status of marriage (or a form of marriage) a union of these kinds. It leaves no room for a State or Territory legislature to create a status of "bigamous marriage", "polygamous marriage", "arranged involuntary marriage" or "trial marriage". Similarly, within and by reason of the schema of the Marriage Act, couples who are not man and woman (whether same-sex or intersex) are and must remain for the purposes of Australian law "unmarried" persons. They remain on that side of the binary divide.

The ACT Government provided its submission to the court on 25 November, arguing in response to the Commonwealth that "neither the Marriage Act 1961 nor the Family Law Act 1975 manifest an intention to be an exhaustive or exclusive statement of the [Australian] law governing the institution of marriage". The Commonwealth filed submissions in reply. The High Court issued its ruling on 12 December 2013, striking down the law as inconsistent with the federal Marriage Act and proclaiming that the Constitution permitted only the Australian Parliament to make laws with respect to marriage. In its judgment, the court held that:

The only issue which this Court can decide is a legal issue. Is the Marriage Equality (Same Sex) Act 2013, enacted by the Legislative Assembly for the Australian Capital Territory, inconsistent with either or both of two Acts of the federal Parliament: the Marriage Act 1961 and the Family Law Act 1975? That question must be answered "Yes". Under the Constitution and federal law as it now stands, whether same sex marriage should be provided for by law (as a majority of the Territory Legislative Assembly decided) is a matter for the federal Parliament.

The court went further to clarify the extent of the inconsistency of the ACT law with the federal law by stating that:

The 2004 amendments to the [federal] Marriage Act made plain (if it was not already plain) that the federal marriage law is a comprehensive and exhaustive statement of the law of marriage...These particular provisions of the Marriage Act, read in the context of the whole Act, necessarily contain the implicit negative proposition that the kind of marriage provided for by the Act is the only kind of marriage that may be formed or recognised in Australia. It follows that the provisions of the ACT Act which provide for marriage under that Act cannot operate concurrently with the [federal] Marriage Act and accordingly are inoperative.

However, the court went on to determine that the word "marriage" in Section 51(xxi) of the Constitution means "a consensual union formed between natural persons in accordance with legally prescribed requirements" where that union is "intended to endure and be terminable only in accordance with law" and "accords a status affecting and defining mutual rights and obligations". Therefore, it included same-sex marriage thus clarifying that there is no constitutional impediment to the Commonwealth legislating for same-sex marriage in the future and as such that a same-sex marriage law passed by the Parliament could operate lawfully. The ruling closed off the possibility for a state or territory to legislate for same-sex marriage in the absence of a federal same-sex marriage law.

=== Federal legalisation in 2017 ===
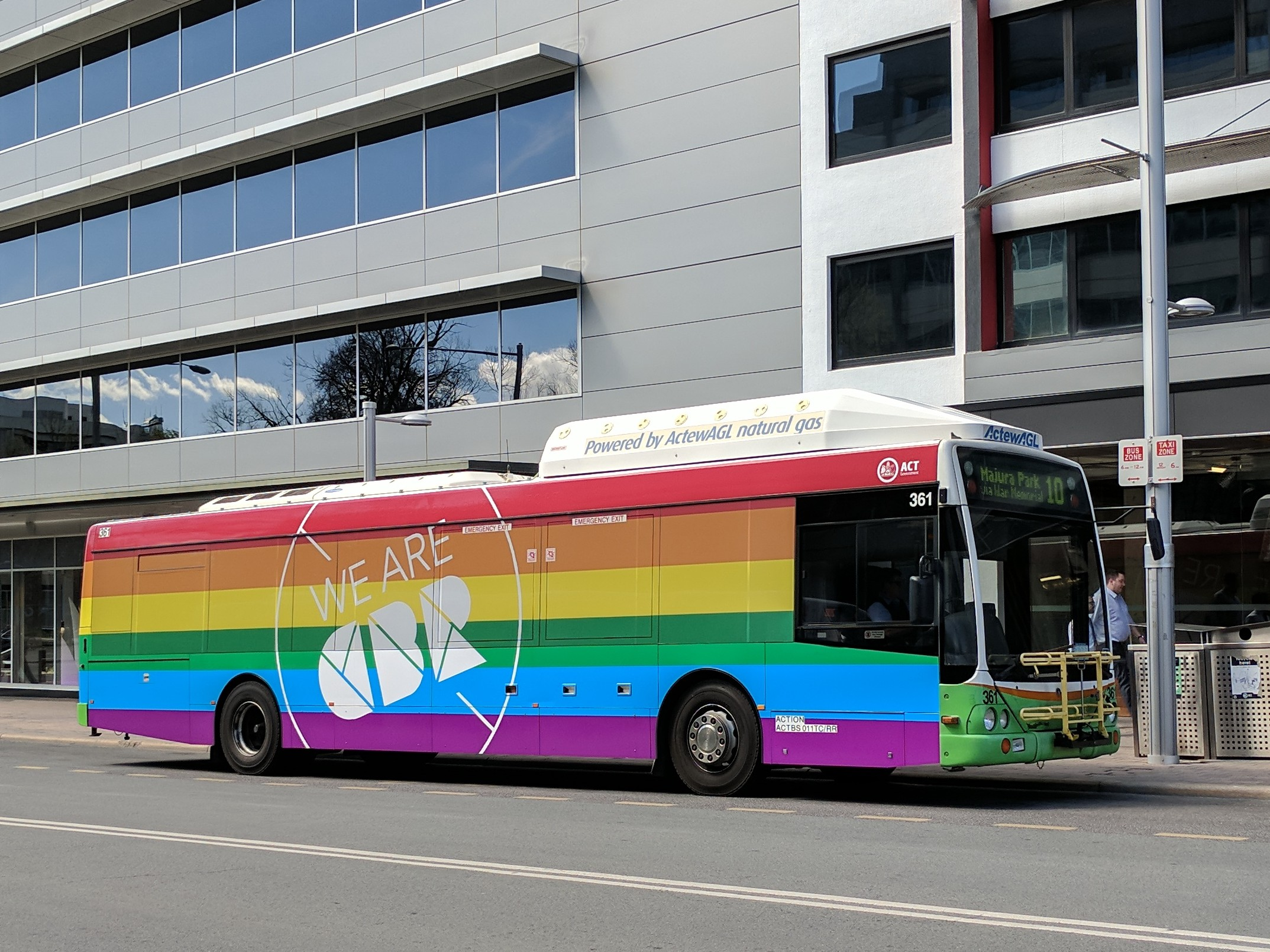
A Canberra bus with rainbow markings as a sign of government support for the "Yes" campaign during the postal survey, September 2017

The Parliament of Australia legalised same-sex marriage nationwide in December 2017 following passage of the Marriage Amendment (Definition and Religious Freedoms) Act 2017. The new law came into effect on 9 December 2017. After the signing of the legislation, the ACT offered free marriage licenses for couples who had married under the 2013 law and who wished to reaffirm their vows, and for couples registered in a civil union. The passage of the 2017 federal law followed a voluntary postal survey of all Australians, in which 61.6% of respondents supported the legalisation of same-sex marriage. The ACT reported the highest "Yes" vote of any state or territory at 74.0%.

=== Demographics and marriage statistics ===
According to the 2021 Australian census, there were 1,959 same-sex couples living in the ACT, accounting for about 1.9% of all couples.

=== Religious performance ===
Most major religious organisations in the Australian Capital Territory do not perform or bless same-sex marriages in their places of worship. The largest religious denomination permitting same-sex marriage is the Uniting Church in Australia. On 13 July 2018, its National Assembly approved the creation of marriage rites for same-sex couples. The change incorporated a gender-neutral definition of marriage in the Church's official statement, though also retained the existing statement on marriage as a heterosexual union, which the Church described as an "equal yet distinct" approach to the issue. Same-sex marriages have been permitted in the Uniting Church since 21 September 2018. Some other religious denominations support and solemnise same-sex marriages, including Buddhist groups, Reform Jewish groups, the Australia and New Zealand Unitarian Universalist Association, the Metropolitan Community Church, and Quakers. The first Quaker same-sex marriage in Australia was held in Canberra on 15 April 2007.

== See also ==
- Same-sex marriage in Australia
- LGBT rights in the Australian Capital Territory
- LGBT rights in Australia
