= LGBTQ rights in Tasmania =

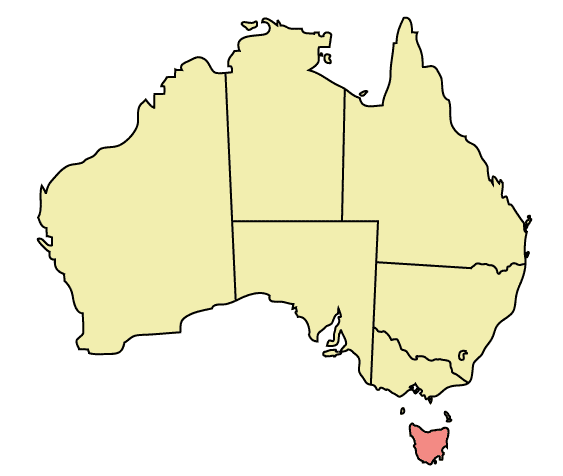
- Tasmania (Australia)
- Legal status: Always legal for women; legal for men since 1997
- Gender identity: Change of sex marker on birth certificate does not require sex reassignment surgery
- Discrimination protections: Since 1999 under state law and since 2013 under federal law

Family rights
- Recognition of relationships: Same-sex marriage since 2017; Registered relationships since 2003
- Adoption: Full adoption rights since 2013

Lesbian, gay, bisexual, transgender, and queer (LGBTQ) people in Australian state of Tasmania have the same legal rights as non-LGBTQ people. Tasmania has a transformative history with respect to the rights of LGBTQ people. Initially dubbed "Bigots' Island" by international media due to intense social and political hostility to LGBTQ rights up until the late 1990s, the state has subsequently been recognised for LGBTQ law reforms that have been described by activists such as Rodney Croome as among the most extensive and noteworthy in the world. Tasmania's criminal penalties for homosexual activity were the harshest in the Western world when they were repealed in 1997. It was the last Australian jurisdiction to decriminalise homosexuality after a United Nations Human Rights Committee ruling, the passage of federal sexual privacy legislation and a High Court challenge to the state's anti-homosexuality laws. Following decriminalisation, social and political attitudes in the state rapidly shifted in favour of LGBTQ rights ahead of national trends with strong anti-LGBTQ discrimination laws passed in 1999, and the first state relationship registration scheme to include same-sex couples introduced in 2003. In 2019, Tasmania passed and implemented the world's most progressive gender-optional birth certificate laws. In July 2023, the Tasmanian government officially included and also added "asexual or asexuality".

Same-sex marriage has been legal in the state since December 2017, after passage of the Marriage Amendment (Definition and Religious Freedoms) Act 2017 in the Australian Parliament. The 2017 Australian Marriage Law Postal Survey, designed to gauge public support for same-sex marriage in Australia, returned a 63.6% "Yes" response in Tasmania. As of September 2026, conversion therapy practices is still legally permitted within Tasmania. In November 2025, the Tasmanian government implemented an Australian first compensation victims fund for past homosexuality and cross dressing criminal record convictions within Tasmania - prior to 1997 and 2002 respectively possibly effecting hundreds of individuals. Effective since August 2, 2026 the up to $75,000 compensation payments for affected individuals were implemented by Tasmanian legislation.

== Laws regarding sexual activity ==
=== History ===
==== Official persecution ====
Sodomy was originally outlawed throughout the island from the time of British settlement. The law was retained post federation as in all other Australian jurisdictions. Tasmania was the last British Empire outpost to carry out the death penalty for sodomy in 1867. Over the subsequent hundred years, Tasmania had the highest rate of imprisonment for private consenting male sex anywhere in the world.

In the late 1980s, Premier Robin Gray stated that homosexuals were unwelcome in Tasmania and police recorded the vehicle registration plates of people attending gay community meetings. A gay rights stall set up in Salamanca Market in 1988 was repeatedly shut down by the Hobart City Council with over 120 people arrested by police. By the early 1990s, the state had the harshest penalty for gay sex in the Western world at 21 years imprisonment.

During the 1980s and early 1990s, six attempts at decriminalisation were emphatically rejected by the Tasmanian Legislative Council, with politician Robert Archer calling for homosexuals to be "tracked down and wiped out" by police. Social and political opinion remained sharply against gay rights until the late 1990s. Many gay and lesbian Tasmanians responded to the hostile sentiment by either relocating to the mainland Australian cities of Sydney or Melbourne, living in the closet or committing suicide. Recalling the personal impact of the 1990s decriminalisation debate, comedian Hannah Gadsby noted it led them to "rot quietly in self-hatred" and unable to develop an aptitude for relationships.

==== UNHRC complaint and federal response ====
The Tasmanian Parliament's repeated refusal to pass laws decriminalising private same-sex sexual acts resulted in local resident Nicholas Toonen bringing a human rights complaint to the United Nations Human Rights Committee, which ruled in Toonen's favour on 31 March 1994. The Committee noted that "the criminalisation of homosexual practices cannot be considered a reasonable means or proportionate measure to achieve the aim of preventing the spread of AIDS/HIV," further noting that "The Australian Government observes that statutes criminalising homosexual activity tend to impede public health programs by driving underground many of the people at the risk of infection." Gay activists and Amnesty International also mounted a campaign in favour of reform including demonstrations in the state and elsewhere, holding meetings between LGBTI Tasmanians and community groups across the state and gay men self-reporting their then-illegal consensual activities to police to illustrate that the laws were unenforceable, given that police would not prosecute them on the basis that it was not in the public interest.

Although the UNHRC decision of 31 March 1994 effectively called on the federal Keating government to overturn Tasmania's anti-homosexuality laws, Keating and his Attorney-General Michael Lavarch were initially slow to act, considering it a low-priority issue. The continued criminalisation led to a petition signed by 12,000 people and a "Buy Right" boycott campaign targeting Tasmanian tourism and produce until the laws were repealed.

Four months after the UNHRC decision and after failing to persuade the Tasmanian Government to repeal the offending laws, the Keating government passed the Human Rights (Sexual Conduct) Act 1994, with section 4 legalising sexual activity between consenting adults throughout Australia and prohibiting any laws that arbitrarily interfere with the sexual conduct of adults in private. Lavarch stated the Tasmanian law was "an obnoxious criminal provision which doesn't exist anywhere else in Australia and is inconsistent with Australia's human-rights obligations".

The Catholic Right members of the Australian Labor Party initially opposed the federal legislation but ultimately agreed to support its passage, while the issue split the opposition Coalition, with many members exercising their conscience vote against it and replacing their relatively progressive leader Alexander Downer with the more conservative John Howard. This law did not directly invalidate the Tasmanian law, as the Keating government preferred to avoid a challenge from conservative states about states rights and instead rely on the High Court to indirectly overturn the Tasmanian law. This approach was criticised by activists and academics for abdicating the political responsibility of legislators for an uncomfortable issue to the courts.

==== High Court case and decriminalisation ====
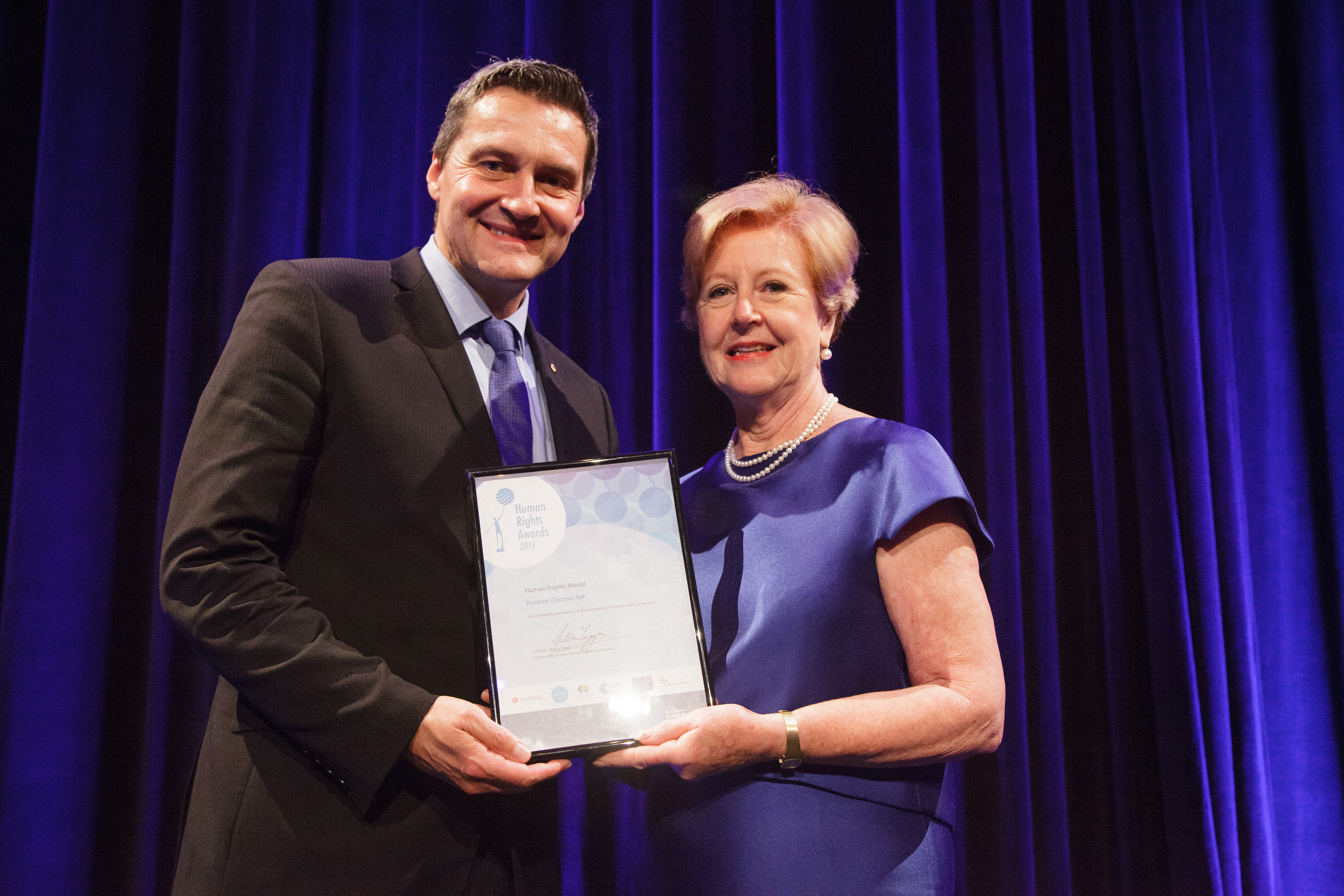
Activist Rodney Croome was named the 2015 Tasmanian Australian of the Year for his LGBT rights work including the decriminalisation of homosexuality in Tasmania.

On 14 November 1995, Nick Toonen and his then-partner Rodney Croome applied to the High Court of Australia for a ruling that Tasmania's anti-gay laws were constitutionally overridden by the Human Rights (Sexual Conduct) Act 1994 and therefore invalid. The case was taken by Alan Goldberg QC, who provided his services pro bono after Croome and Toonen were denied legal aid to mount the case despite fulfilling the criteria for funding as a public interest test case.

In 1996, the state Liberal Government of Tony Rundle changed its position on gay law reform from opposition to allowing a conscience vote after failing in its attempts to have the High Court matter struck out and amid growing local support for reform. The Tasmanian Greens under Christine Milne then began to push vigorously for law reform.

As a result of these changes, on 1 May 1997 a bill formally repealing the state’s anti-homosexuality laws (the Criminal Code Amendment Act 1997) passed in the Tasmanian Legislative Council by one vote, after having passed in the Tasmanian House of Assembly on 26 March. Royal Assent was received on 13 May 1997 and the law came into effect the next day.

The age of consent in Tasmania is 17 years and is equal for all forms of sexual activity.

=== Historical conviction expungement scheme ===
In December 2015, the Tasmanian Liberal Government announced it would introduce legislation in the Tasmanian Parliament to expunge historic criminal records for consensual homosexual sexual activity. This announcement followed a report released by the Tasmanian Anti-Discrimination Commissioner in April 2015 which recommended the establishment of such a scheme and how it should be modelled. Individuals charged with offences pertaining to homosexual sexual conduct prior to its decriminalisation in 1997 will be able to submit an application with the state's Secretary of the Department of Justice to have such charges removed from their criminal records. A draft bill was released by the Department of Justice in June 2016.

On 6 April 2017, the Expungement of Historical Offences Act 2017 was introduced to the Tasmanian House of Assembly by Attorney-General Vanessa Goodwin. The bill would allow those who were convicted of homosexual sexual offences (prior to its decriminalisation in Tasmania in 1997) and cross-dressing (which was an offence under the Police Offences Act 1935, until being repealed in 2001) to apply to the Secretary for the Department of Justice, or have a person apply on their behalf if deceased, to have their conviction expunged. The bill was debated in the Assembly on 13 April, and was passed in the Assembly on 2 May 2017. It then proceeded to the mostly independent Legislative Council for consideration, where a first reading was held on 19 May 2017. The bill was debated in the council on 20 and 21 September 2017, passing the council on the latter date. Several amendments designed to streamline procedures relating to applications, the treatment of sensitive data and the decision-making process were agreed to by the council. The Assembly agreed to the council's amendments on 18 October 2017, and the bill became an Act of Parliament by royal assent on 21 November 2017. The law went into effect on 9 April 2018. Schemes of this nature exist in all other jurisdictions of Australia.

As of November 2020, a proposal to establish a compensation scheme for individuals convicted of same-sex sexual activity or cross dressing prior to 1997 and 2001 respectively is being drafted. On August 2, 2026 the up to $75,000 for effected individuals compensation payment went into effect by Tasmanian legislation.

=== Parliamentary apology ===
On 13 April 2017, the Tasmanian Government, represented by Premier Will Hodgman, issued an official parliamentary apology to members of the LGBT community in Tasmania who had been historically affected by laws which criminalised homosexuality in the state until 1997. Hodgman stated that "it is [the government's] view that the broader Tasmanian community would believe that people should never have been charged or convicted in the first place, even if it was thought at the time it was the right thing to do, it was not". Leader of the Opposition Rebecca White also issued an official apology, saying an apology was "long overdue" for the "terrible injustice done as a result of these laws". Cassy O'Connor, leader of the Greens, asked the LGBTI Tasmanian community "to forgive us for not holding you in our arms".

== Recognition of same-sex relationships ==
Tasmania's Relationships Act 2003 provides for registration and recognition of a type of registered partnership in two distinct categories: significant relationships and caring relationships. The same Act also amended 73 pieces of legislation to provide registered partners with nearly all of the rights offered to married couples within the state. Furthermore, since July 2009, these relationships are recognised at the federal level, providing couples with almost all of the federal rights and benefits of marriage. The legislation came into effect on 1 January 2004. In September 2010, the Parliament of Tasmania approved legislation to recognise same-sex unions performed outside Tasmania as significant relationships.

=== Significant and caring relationships ===
Both same-sex and opposite-sex couples can register a significant relationship if both are unrelated, unmarried adults living in Tasmania. Tasmania introduced the scheme in 2003, becoming the first state in Australia to establish a relationship registration scheme that was open to all couples.

Likewise, two adults residing in Tasmania, related or not, can register a caring relationship if one provides the other with domestic support and personal care. The parties cannot be married to each other, cannot be in an existing significant or caring relationship, and neither can be receiving payment for the care of the other either from employment or government departments.

Both types of relationships provide identical rights in the following areas:

- Superannuation (pension/retirement benefits)
- Taxation
- Insurance
- Health care
- Hospital visitation
- Wills
- Property division
- Employment conditions (such as parenting and bereavement leave)

Couples entering into a significant or caring relationship must sign a Deed of Relationship document. This is registered with the Registrar of Births, Deaths and Marriages. The registry then issues a certificate of registration, which is evidence of a personal relationship (significant or caring). Consequently, the relationship will be legally recognised without having to satisfy any other criteria to prove its existence. Upon entering into a Deed of Relationship, couples are allowed to have a state-sanctioned ceremony to celebrate their union.

=== Recognition from other jurisdictions ===
Since being elected in 2007, the then-Prime Minister, Kevin Rudd, had been encouraging all states to create relationship registers identical to Tasmania's model in order to create nationwide uniformity and consistent rights, while at the same time not supporting anything that appears too similar to marriage. The Australian Commonwealth Government also recognises a Tasmanian registered partnership as a "de facto relationship" under federal law. De facto couples, whether same-sex or opposite-sex, have been entitled to nearly all of the federal rights of marriage since 1 July 2009.

In September 2010, the Tasmanian Parliament passed legislation to recognise out-of-state same-sex unions as significant relationships.

=== Same-sex marriage ===
Same-sex marriage became legal in Tasmania, and in the rest of Australia, in December 2017, after the Federal Parliament passed a law legalising same-sex marriage.

Prior to this, Tasmania did attempt to legalise same-sex marriage at a state-based level. In August 2012, Premier Lara Giddings announced that Tasmania would pass new laws allowing same-sex couples to marry. However, although the same-sex marriage bill passed 13–11 in the lower house, the Legislative Council rejected the bill 6–8 on 27 September 2012. In December 2013, the Australian Capital Territory's same-sex marriage legislation was declared unconstitutional by the High Court of Australia due to inconsistency with the federal Marriage Act 1961. This meant that the state parliaments did not have the legal capacity to legislate for same-sex marriage even if they wanted to.

On 19 November 2015, the lower house of the Parliament of Tasmania passed a motion by a vote of 15–9, calling on the Federal Government to pass a same-sex marriage bill based on a conscience vote. Both Western Australia and New South Wales also passed similar motions. On 9 August 2016, the Tasmanian upper house also passed a motion in favour of same-sex marriages. The vote was 8–5.

Motion wording:

1. Notes Members of the Tasmanian Legislative Assembly and community hold various views on the issue of marriage equality
2. Wishes our federal colleagues a respectful debate that is tolerant of all views
3. Notes the importance of MPs being free to express their own view and the views of their electorates on this issue

== Adoption and parenting rights ==
Tasmanian law allows same-sex couples to adopt. The Adoption Act 1988 states that "an order for the adoption of a child may be made in favour of two persons who, for a period of not less than 3 years before the date on which the order is made, have been married to each other or have been the parties to a significant relationship which is the subject of a deed of relationship registered under Part 2 of the Relationships Act 2003." The Adoption Act 1988 was amended by the Parliament in June 2013 to allow same-sex couples to adopt children not known to them. This made Tasmania the fourth jurisdiction in Australia at the time to grant same-sex couples full joint adoption legal rights.

Under section 10C of the Status of Children Act 1974, same-sex partners of women who give birth to children conceived through sperm donation, IVF or other artificial reproductive technology (ART) are presumed to be the child's other parent or co-mother in the same way as male partners of heterosexual women. Both mothers can be placed on the birth certificate, allowing such couples to have access to the same rights of/for their children (such as medical or hospital forms, education processes, access to entitlements, etc.). The legislation on parentage from IVF is retrospective, meaning the law applied to co-mothers before it went into effect. Section 29 of the Adoption Act allows the female partner of the birth mother to adopt the child born as a result of the ART process.

In 2012, Tasmania passed two pieces of legislation to legally allow altruistic surrogacy. The two laws are called the Surrogacy Act No 34 and the Surrogacy (Consequential Amendments) Act No 31. Proposed altruistic surrogacy legislation was drafted and passed by both houses of the Tasmanian Parliament, after a review of the Surrogacy Contracts Act 1993 No 4, and after an ongoing community consultation process. Under the altruistic surrogacy legislation, the surrogate must be at least 25 years old and it cannot be her first pregnancy. The new altruistic surrogacy laws went into effect on 1 May 2013.

== Discrimination protections ==
The Anti-Discrimination Act 1998 (Tas) is a state law that prohibits "discrimination and other specified conduct" (called "prohibited conduct" in the Act) and provides "for the investigation and conciliation of, and inquiry into, complaints" of discrimination and prohibited conduct. The Act outlaws discrimination in Tasmania on a wide variety of attributes, including gender, lawful sexual activity, actual or perceived sexual orientation and/or gender identity. In September 2013, the Act was amended to extend protections to transgender and intersex people, whilst also extending protections from offensive conduct to prohibit a person from offending, humiliating, intimidating, insulting or ridiculing another person on the basis of their actual or perceived gender, sexual orientation and/or gender identity.

Federal law also protects LGBTI people in Tasmania in the form of the Sex Discrimination Amendment (Sexual Orientation, Gender Identity and Intersex Status) Act 2013.

=== Lawsuit banning transgender individuals ===
In July 2021, a lawsuit was filed in court to banning transgender individuals in biological female spaces within Tasmania – due to recent laws on birth certificates implemented in 2019.

== Hate crime laws ==
In September 2025, a hate crimes bill passed the lower house - that explicitly includes sexual orientation and gender identity within the 1997 sentencing act. The upper house is yet to vote on the bill.

== Transgender rights ==
In line with its transformation on other LGBT issues, Tasmania's approach to transgender people has changed from strong opposition to one of the most liberal in the world. It was the only Australian state to criminalise cross-dressing, decriminalising it in 2001. Before 2019, Tasmania allowed for a change of sex to be recognised though mandated that the person in question divorce if married and undergo sex reassignment surgery. In February 2016, the Tasmanian Anti-Discrimination Commissioner proposed among other things that those two requirements be removed and that a "non-binary" sex descriptor be added.

In October 2018, the Liberal government introduced legislation to the Parliament repealing the requirement that one must be "unmarried" for a change of sex to be registered on one's birth certificate. The requirement for sex reassignment surgery remained, a point which was criticised by transgender advocates. In response, the opposition Labor Party and the Greens successfully passed several amendments to the bill when it was debated in the Assembly on 20 November 2018. As well as removing the forced divorce requirement, the amended bill also repealed the requirement for sex reassignment surgery and any medical requirement; gender change would only require a simple declaration. The bill allows parents to choose whether their child's gender is recorded on birth certificates, lowered the age a person can change their legal gender without parental permission to sixteen, and allows parents to change the legal gender of their children. It extended the time limit for parents of intersex children to register their child's birth (to 120 days after birth). Individuals were also permitted to remove a gender descriptor entirely from their birth certificate and state anti-discrimination law was updated to incorporate gender expression. While these changes were opposed by the Liberal government, they passed due to the decisive vote of the Liberal Speaker, Sue Hickey, who voted against party lines. The bill proceeded to the independent-dominated Legislative Council. The bill had originally been scheduled for debate by the Council in November 2018, but the government delayed consideration until March 2019, citing opposition to the amendments passed against its wishes in the Assembly. The bill's second reading was passed with minor amendments attached in the Legislative Council on 4 April 2019. The amended bill returned to the Assembly for approval of the council's amendments on 10 April 2019. Once again the bill passed with the support of Labor, the Greens and Liberal Speaker Sue Hickey. The bill received royal assent on 8 May 2019, with the majority of the bill commencing on the same day. The parts that contains amendments to the Births, Deaths and Marriages Registration Act 1999 went into effect on 5 September 2019.

The laws were supported by transgender rights group Transforming Tasmania and long time LGBT activist Rodney Croome and opposed by the Tasmanian Liberal Party and Prime Minister Scott Morrison.

== Intersex rights ==
In March 2017, representatives of Androgen Insensitivity Syndrome Support Group Australia and Organisation Intersex International Australia participated in an Australian and Aotearoa/New Zealand consensus "Darlington Statement" by intersex community organizations and others. The statement calls for legal reform, including the criminalization of deferrable intersex medical interventions on children, an end to legal classification of sex, and improved access to peer support.

As of 1 August 2017, Tasmania is one of three states and territories to include protections specific to intersex people in anti-discrimination law. The other three jurisdictions are the Australian Capital Territory and South Australia.

== Summary table ==
Same-sex sexual activity legal with an equal age of consent set at 17	Yes (Since 1997 for men; always for women)
Compensation for past gay sex and cross-dressing criminal record acts	Yes (Since 2026 - the first within Australia)
Anti-discrimination state laws for sexual orientation with no religious exemption	Yes (Since 1999)
Anti-discrimination state laws for gender identity or expression with no religious exemption	Yes (Since 2013)
Hate crime laws include sexual orientation	Yes (Since 1999)
Hate crime laws include gender identity or expression	Yes (Since 2019)
Laws against LGBT vilification	Yes
Same-sex marriages legalised	Yes (Since 2017)
Recognition in state law of same-sex couples as domestic partners	Yes (Since 2003)
Full joint adoption, IVF and altruistic surrogacy access and recognition for same-sex couples	Yes
Implemented birth certificate law reforms without impediments	Yes
Gay sex criminal records expunged	Yes (Since 2018)
Gay panic defence abolished	Yes
Conversion therapy on minors outlawed	No (Proposed)
Conversion therapy on adults outlawed	No
Gender self-identification	Yes
Legal recognition of non-binary gender	Yes
MSMs allowed to donate blood	Yes (Since 2026, must be monogamous as a condition)

== See also ==
- Transgender rights in Australia
- Intersex rights in Australia
- LGBT rights in Australia
- Same-sex marriage in Australia
