= Victorian Pride Lobby =

LGBTQ+ rights advocacy lobby in Victoria

The Victorian Pride Lobby (the Lobby, formerly the Victorian Gay and Lesbian Rights Lobby) is a community-based advocacy group that works towards equality, social justice and advancing human rights for lesbian, gay, queer, bisexual and same-sex attracted people in Victoria.

The Lobby was created in October 1997, following the presentation of a report to a public meeting which proposed a model for a Victorian Gay and Lesbian Rights Lobby. This model was accepted, and 21 days later the Lobby held its first annual general meeting, elected a management committee, adopted the rules of association, and began the process of incorporation.

The Victorian Pride Lobby is a community based advocacy group that works towards equality, social justice and advancing human rights for lesbian, gay, queer, bisexual, and same sex attracted Victorians. They work together with, and lobby on behalf of, the whole community. They do not speak in the place of trans and gender diverse, intersex, and asexual community members, but rather work in conjunction with trans and gender diverse, intersex, and asexual community organisations to achieve social change for the LGBTIQA+ community.

In 2020, the Lobby’s members and the Committee of Management voted unanimously in favour of changing its name to the Victorian Pride Lobby.

== Campaigns ==
The Lobby has worked on a variety of issues such as domestic partnerships, access to in vitro fertilisation and adoption, and an end to homophobic violence.

The Lobby also initiated the national Equal Love campaign, in an effort to win marriage rights for Australian gay and lesbian couples.

== Committee ==
The Committee is voted in by its membership at an annual general meeting.

The Committee is made up of up to 10 current Lobby members from the gay, lesbian, bisexual, queer and same-sex attracted community. The Committee of Management is responsible for the day-to-day running of the organization and each member usually heads a portfolio or working group.

Current Committee members include:

- Austin Fabry-Jenkins
- Liam Elphick
- Matthew Wade
- Tristan Gooey
- Odus Moore
- Devina Potter
- Nevena Spirovska
- Darin Aqila
- Chloe Holmes
- Jay Morrison

== Convenors ==
The current Co-Convenors are Austin Fabry-Jenkins and Liam Elphick.

== See also ==
- LGBT rights in Australia
- Transgender rights in Australia
- Intersex rights in Australia
- List of LGBT rights organisations
- Politics of Victoria
