= Sydney Pride Centre =

The Sydney Pride Centre was established in 1989 by PRIDE Sydney Lesbian and Gay Community Centre Limited, with a mission to 'establish a permanent community centre for the diversity of lesbians and gay men in Sydney and to build a vital, visible and positive community.' Initially focused on fundraising and establishing the right organisational framework, early fundraising parties were produced by PRIDE and in conjunction with Bacchanalia, Sweatbox, ACON and Prasit. The Founding board included Gary Cox, Adrian Gough, Gigi Legenhausen, Gillian Minnervini, Paul Nicholson, Philippa Playford, Malcolm Thorne, David Wilkins and Rob Williams.

During 1994 the PRIDE Board made the decision to pursue a lease rather than purchase a building, in order to expedite the opening of a Pride Centre. The following year, on 25 June 1995, the PRIDE Centre was officially opened at 26 Hutchinson Street, Surry Hills. Inaugural tenants included Fitness Exchange and Support of Positive Youth, who were soon joined by Alternative Networks; later tenants included Women's Liberation House, Sydney Leather Pride, The Luncheon Club, The Larder, Positive Access Program, Out & Out, Deaf Gay and Lesbian Association, Gay Freethinkers, Gay & Lesbian Martial Arts, Sisters of Perpetual Indulgence, Team Sydney and Sydney's Pride History Group was founded through discussions at the centre.

While the centre has closed, activities like Sydney's annual pride festival carry on in a different form.

Sydney Pride Centre provided a physical venue at the Erskineville Town Hall for the community organisations and individuals to meet, work, and socialise together until it closed in 2007.

== Objectives ==
The objectives of the centre were managing and developing a community center in activities related to cultural development, creating access to educational activities with training opportunities, building a team spirit, and helping to promote community health and well-being.

== Working in partnership ==
The Sydney Pride Centre established links between community groups and worked closely with other organisations for the benefit of the community. An example of this was the work done with ACON, the Gay & Lesbian Rights Lobby and Queerscreen to set up the New Mardi Gras (formerly Sydney Gay and Lesbian Mardi Gras).

Sydney Pride Centre's biggest collaborative project was the annual PRIDE Week celebration, commemorating the Stonewall Riots. With the closure of the Sydney Pride Centre, the festival continues and, in 2013, a festival was held titled "A Time to Shine".

The Sydney Pride Centre also held community forums to explore important issues and to develop ideas and projects, and when the need arose, brought together a diverse cross-section of community organizations.

== Gay and Lesbian Holocaust Memorial Project ==
The Gay and Lesbian Holocaust Memorial Project was founded by a group of community activists. Over the years, they raised funds to build a memorial at a suitable site. With the help of South Sydney City Council, a site at Green Park in Darlinghurst was created which is known as the heart of Sydney's gay and lesbian population. Green Park is adjacent to the Jewish Museum, which ensures that the memorial retains its historic meaning.

The memorial was constructed over a period of months in 2000. Its dedication ceremony occurred on Tuesday, 27 February 2001. The memorial was then handed over to the custodianship of the Sydney Pride Centre. Speakers at the dedication included:

- Cr John Fowler, Mayor of South Sydney City Council
- Luci Ellis, past president of Gay & Lesbian Holocaust Memorial Project Incorporated
- John Marsden, chairperson of the Gay & Lesbian Holocaust Memorial Project Incorporated
- Justice Marcus Einfeld AO QC
- Lou-Anne Lind, president of the Sydney Pride Centre
- Kitty Fischer, Holocaust survivor

== See also ==
- Star Observer
