= Australian Marriage Equality =

Australian LGBT rights advocacy group

Australian Marriage Equality (AME) was an advocacy group driven by volunteers who came together to pursue the legalisation of same-sex marriage in Australia. AME partnered with a diverse range of organisations and supporters across the country to end the exclusion of same-sex LGBTQ couples from marriage in Australia. It was the pre-eminent group campaigning for same-sex marriage in Australia.

AME was founded in 2004 prior to the Federal Parliament's passage of a bill amending the Marriage Act 1961 to rule out the legal recognition of marriages between same-sex couples.

There was a postal poll on the issue of same-sex marriage from September to November 2017. Australian Marriage Equality, with Senator Janet Rice, lodged a High Court Challenge to the constitutional validity of this postal survey, which was heard in September. The High Court ruled the survey could proceed despite Australian Marriage Equality's challenge.

== National conveners and structure ==
The co-founders and first national co-conveners of AME were Luke Gahan and Geraldine Donoghue. Luke, grandson of the former Mayor of Prahran George Gahan, had been a member of the Australian Labor Party and Treasurer of the Gay and Lesbian Rights Lobby. In a 2011 book called Speak Now, Gahan spoke openly about being the youngest 'gay married' Australian, and subsequently Australia's first 'gay divorcee'.

The second national Convener of AME was Peter Furness. Furness was a former South Sydney Councillor for the Australian Democrats.

The third national Convener of AME was Dr Sharon Dane, who is a social psychology researcher at the School of Psychology at the University of Queensland. Dane was the lead author of "Not So Private Lives", the first national study to examine same-sex Australians' preferences for relationship recognition, since the introduction of de facto status for same-sex couples at a federal level. She presented findings from this research at the hearing of the Senate Inquiry into the Marriage Equality Amendment Bill 2009. Dane married her partner Elaine Crump in Toronto, Canada on 23 July 2008.

The fourth national Convenor, from 2009, was Alex Greenwich, who had been AME National Secretary since 2007. Greenwich is the son of Mr Victor Greenwich, Head of the Georgian Consular General in Sydney. In 2012 Greenwich married his German partner Victor Hoeld in Argentina. Greenwich was an unsuccessful candidate for the 2012 City of Sydney Council election. Following his loss at the City of Sydney elections, Greenwich was endorsed by the outgoing New South Wales state member of Parliament Clover Moore MLA to run for the seat of Sydney in a by-election in 2012.

After this, he stood down as national convenor to focus on his campaign, ultimately winning his seat in October 2012. In doing so, he became the first same-sex married man in an Australian Parliament. He continued to play an ongoing role in the organisation since his election, serving as co-chair and a member of the Board after Australian Marriage Equality adopted a more formalised governance model in 2015.

After Greenwich's election to New South Wales Parliament, Rodney Croome from Tasmania served as the fifth national AME Convenor and, from 2015, also as a Director on the Board. The formal Board that was introduced in April 2015 saw Janine Middleton, who had spent two decades overseas working in the finance industry, join Alex Greenwich as co-chair. Other Board members appointed at this time included Jay Allen, who had served as Secretary of the organisation since 2012, Sarah Midgley, NSW Co-Convenor since 2012 and Tim Peppard who had been a Victorian Director since 2013. Shirleene Robinson, NSW Co-Convenor since 2012, later joined the Board

In August 2015, Croome stepped down from his role as National Director of AME, announcing he wished to focus exclusively on an anti-plebiscite campaign.

== Activities ==
The first national co-convenors Luke Gahan and Geraldine Donoghue launched Australia's campaign for marriage equality in May 2005, 9 months after the Federal Liberal/National Party Coalition Government banned same-sex marriage.

AME began newspaper and television advertisements in 2009 to call for same-sex marriage. The organisation was also invited to speak at a hearing into the Senate Inquiry into the Marriage Equality Amendment Bill 2009.

In December 2011 AME campaigners met with Sydney's Catholic Archbishop of Sydney, Cardinal George Pell to discuss the Australian Catholic Church's campaign against same-sex marriage. The group has also met with members of parliament from both major parties to stress the importance of marriage to families and to gay and lesbian youth.

AME members protested Prime Minister Julia Gillard's address to the Sydney Institute at a dinner in Luna Park in April 2011, with protesters holding photographs of same-sex couples who could not marry. Later that year, they launched a series of touring workshops called "Local Voices," which aim to cultivate grassroots activism for same-sex marriage.

Speaking on behalf of AME, Rodney Croome has repeatedly criticised Senator Cory Bernardi's remarks linking same-sex marriage to polygamy and bestiality. In June 2013 Croome said "Not one country that has allowed same-sex marriage has moved to legitimise polygamy or bestiality for the simple reason they're not linked, legally, socially or culturally".

In August 2013, AME announced that they would distribute leaflets to "over half a million Australian voters" with information about their local candidate's stance on marriage equality. Rodney Croome highlighted a poll released by the Australia Institute finding that same-sex marriage was the fourth most important issue to 18- to 25-year-old voters. A Fairfax Nielsen Poll later that month found that 65% of Australians supported marriage equality, while only 16% said the issue was "very important" in deciding their vote. Croome commented that there is a "huge gap" between public acceptance of same-sex relationships and the low level of support for same-sex marriage among politicians.

Same-sex marriage was introduced for the first time in Australia in the Australian Capital Territory in December 2013, but the Marriage Equality (Same Sex) Act 2013 was subsequently voided by a legal challenge to the High Court. However AME said the ruling was just "a temporary defeat". Former Prime Minister Kevin Rudd proposed that same-sex marriage go to a referendum in June 2013, but the offer was rejected by AME and the Greens.

In 2013, Rodney Croome criticised the tactics of the Australian marriage-equality lobby-group Equal Love as "counterproductive and unrepresentative" to the movement, which he claimed drive away the elderly and people of faith, echoing other criticism of the group in the Star Observer. A committee member for Equal Love argued Croome launched an "unsubtle attack" and defended their tactics, stating "a visual display of community outrage over the issue emboldens those who want change"

In late 2013, following an exchange between AME and Tony Briffa, vice president of the Organisation Intersex International Australia, regarding the terminology same-sex marriage, the issue was resolved such that any proposed legislation should not use the phrase 'same-sex marriage'.

Australian Marriage Equality has campaigned with Community Action Against Homophobia (CAAH). In September 2013 Rodney Croome wrote to CAAH expressing his concerns in regards to what he perceived to be more radical campaigning methods used by CAAH saying, "It is a double standard to demand respect for same-sex relationships without showing the same respect in return".

With the introduction of same-sex marriage in the United Kingdom, same-sex couples, where one or both of the partners are British nationals, were able to marry at British consulates in Australia from June 2014 (for which AME congratulated the government); however, their marriages were not legally recognised in Australia.

In March 2015 an ad denouncing same-sex families was broadcast on national TV, during the Gay and Lesbian Mardi Gras, causing backlash amongst the community on social media.

Throughout 2015–2016, AME spoke out against the potential plebiscite on marriage equality that had been mooted by then Prime Minister Tony Abbott and continued by his replacement as prime minister, Malcolm Turnbull. AME noted there was no constitutional need for a public vote in Australia and that marriage equality should be introduced through a free vote in Australian Parliament. Furthermore, AME argued that an expensive and divisive plebiscite had the potential to cause undue stress to LGBTIQ people. In conjunction with GetUp, AME collected more than 55,000 signatures on a petition opposing a plebiscite and presented this petition at Parliament.

=== Raising awareness ===
On Valentine's Day 2011, AME, partnered with GetUp! to run the Marriage Matters advertising campaign, emphasising the importance of marriage to gay and lesbian couples. Another commercial released around the same time featured twin brothers Paul and David Battye; Paul was best man at his brother's wedding, but cannot himself get married.

When Prince William of Wales and Catherine Middleton married in 2011, AME, with the help of GetUp!, sponsored public outdoor screenings of the event in order to call attention to the fact that gay and lesbian people in Australia cannot marry their partners. "On this happy day when Australians celebrate the royal wedding, many Australians share the aspiration to one day marry their own 'prince' or princess', including many gay and lesbian Australians," commented a spokesperson for the organisation.

=== Commissioning polls and studies ===
AME commissioned a Galaxy Poll in 2010 which found that 62 per cent of Australians supported same-sex marriage, and 80 per cent of young people (18–24 years) supported marriage equality. In 2011 they commissioned a second Poll which found 75% of Australians thought legalising same-sex marriage in Australia is inevitable.

In March 2011, AME released a paper which found that Australia's same-sex marriage ban hurt its economy. According to the paper, married partners are less likely to seek government aid, state and territorial governments gain money by issuing marriage licenses, wedding expenditures would stimulate the economy, and tourism would also benefit.

A July 2014 poll, commissioned by Australian Marriage Equality and conducted by Lynton Crosby and Mark Textor, found that 72% of Australians supported legalising same-sex marriage, while 21% were opposed. A majority of those identifying with major religions supported same-sex marriage, including Catholics, Anglicans and non-Christian religions as did a majority of older Australians aged over 55. Textor stated, "This poll definitively puts pay to some of the myths that married couples or those with religious beliefs are against same-sex marriage. It doesn't devalue their marriages or faith, and instead gives everyone equal access to the rights they are accorded". Further, 77% of respondents agreed that Coalition MPs and Senators should be granted a conscience vote on the issue.

=== After the campaign ===
In the aftermath of the changes to Australian marriage law, Australian Marriage Equality has shared learnings from the campaign with other countries such as Taiwan in their quest for marriage equality.

In July 2020, Australian Marriage Equality announced it was officially winding down as an organisation. The group's social media pages have remained active to promote leading LGBTIQ community organisations, to draw attention to issues and legislation impacting LGBTIQ people.

== See also ==
- Australian Marriage Law Postal Survey
- Coalition of Activist Lesbians Australia (COAL)
- Community Action Against Homophobia (CAAH)
- Equal Love
- LGBT rights in Australia
- List of LGBT rights organisations
- Organisation Intersex International Australia
