= Rodney Croome =

Australian LGBT rights activist and academic

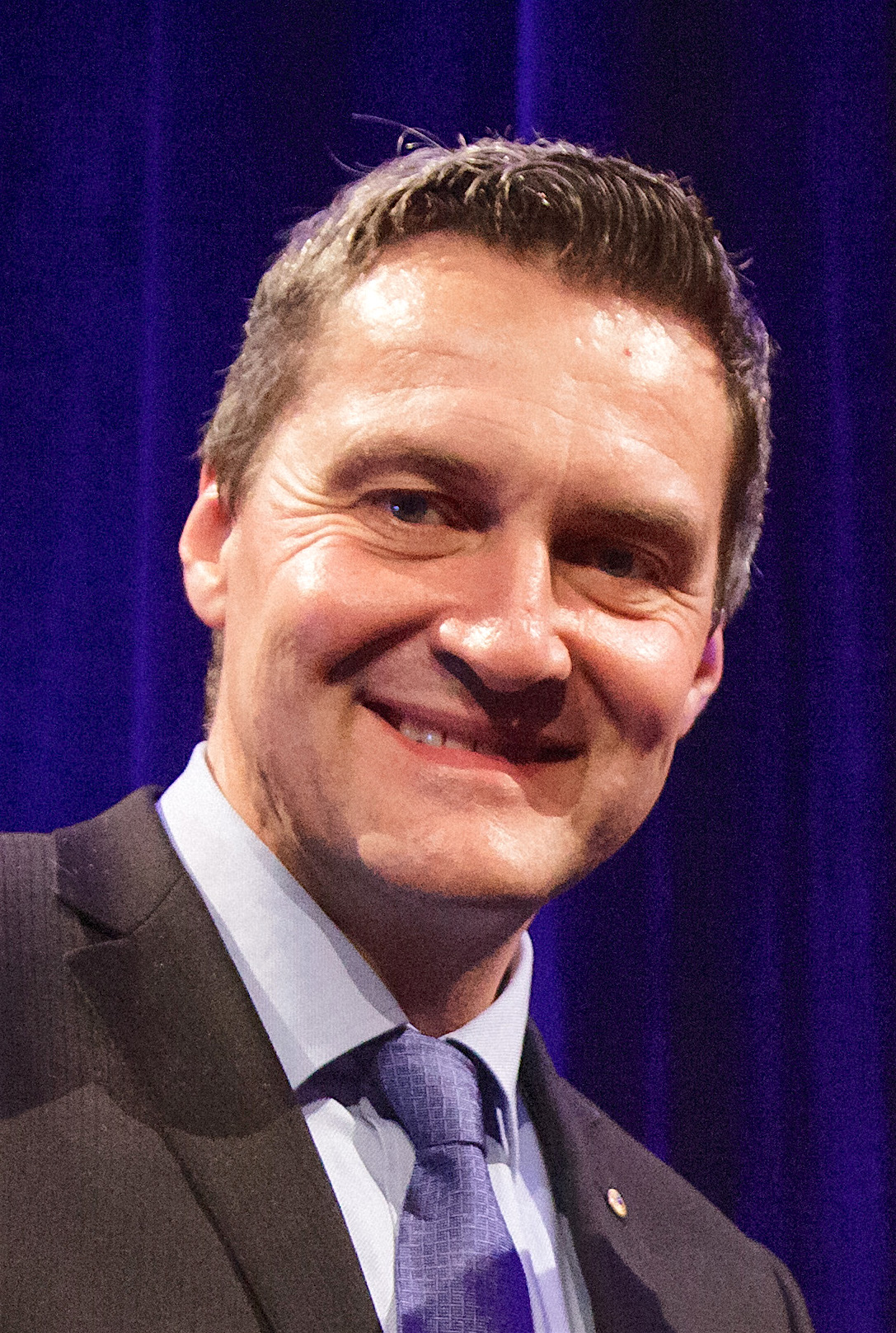
Croome at the 2015 Human Rights Awards

Rodney Peter Croome AM (born 1964) is an Australian LGBT rights activist and academic. He worked on the campaign to decriminalise homosexuality in Tasmania, was founder and national director of Australian Marriage Equality, and currently serves as the policy officer for Equality Tasmania and a spokesperson for LGBT advocacy group Just.Equal Australia.

== Early life ==
Croome grew up on a dairy farm in Tasmania's North West and studied European History at the University of Tasmania, graduating with a Bachelor of Arts in 1988.

== Activism ==
=== Tasmania ===
Croome was one of the founding members of the Tasmanian Gay Law Reform Group, later renamed the Tasmanian Gay and Lesbian Rights Group and Equality Tasmania. He was also the founding president and long-term board member of the Tasmanian LGBT support organisation, 'Working It Out' as well as initiating and being a founding member of Tasmania’s five LGBT government liaison groups (education, health, police and whole-of-government). As a spokesperson for the Tasmanian Gay and Lesbian Rights Group, Croome fronted the successful campaign to decriminalise homosexuality in Tasmania, which until 1 May 1997 was a criminal offence punishable by up to 21 years in jail. That campaign saw Tasmanian activists take their case to the United Nations (Toonen v Australia), the Federal Government and the High Court. In 1988, Croome was arrested four times at Salamanca Market for helping staff a gay law reform stall that had been banned by the Hobart City Council. In 1994, he was one of several gay partners who turned themselves in to Tasmania Police for breaking the state’s laws against homosexuality. In 1995 in the case of Croome v Tasmania, Croome applied to the High Court of Australia for a ruling as to whether the Tasmanian laws were inconsistent with the federal Human Rights (Sexual Conduct) Act 1994. The Tasmanian Government repealed the relevant Criminal Code provisions after failing in its attempts to have the matter struck out. Croome also helped lead the campaigns for Tasmanian anti-discrimination laws, the legal recognition of same-sex relationships and parenting, the expungement of criminal records for those convicted under the state’s former laws against homosexuality and cross-dressing, and self-identification laws for transgender and gender diverse Tasmanians. He has given advice and support to a large number of LGBT Tasmanians who have made discrimination and hate speech complaints.

In 2011 Croome helped found Tasmanians United for Marriage Equality to campaign for the recognition of overseas same-sex marriages in Tasmania and a Tasmanian same-sex marriage law. On behalf of Equality Tasmania he is currently advocating for a ban on conversion practices, for stronger hate crime laws, for LGBT inclusion policies in non-government schools and for financial redress for those charged and convicted under Tasmania’s former laws against homosexuality and cross-dressing.

As a member of Tasmania’s LGBT government liaison groups, Croome has played a leading role in the implementation of policies and programs challenging homophobia and transphobia in Tasmanian schools, LGBT awareness training for Tasmanian police recruits and health workers, the development of LGBT actions plans for the departments of justice, police and health, and the development of the Tasmanian Government’s whole-of-government LGBT action plan. Through Equality Tasmania he is working with Tasmanian local government, including the cities of Hobart, Launceston and Burnie, to develop local LGBT action plans. Every year since 1994 Croome has helped conduct an LGBT history walk as part of the Tas Pride Festival. He has written or contributed to a number of essays on Tasmanian LGBT history.

=== Same-sex marriage ===
Croome was one of the first advocates in Australia to advocate for same-sex marriage in 2003, at a time when it wasn't a popular topic of discussion both within the LGBTI community and more broadly. In January 2004 Croome correctly predicted that the Howard Government would define marriage as a heterosexual union with the support of the Labor Opposition. He then went on to found Australian Marriage Equality. Despite opposition to the idea of marriage equality, Croome would commit the next 13 years of his life fighting for marriage equality for all Australians. He advocated both at a national level and at a local level, addressing local communities across Australia. From 2005, he advocated for state same-sex marriage laws. This led to the passage of a same-sex marriage law in the ACT in 2013 which was challenged by the Federal Government and overturned by the High Court after 37 couples were married under the ACT law.

In 2010, Croome co-authored a book presenting the cases for and against marriage equality, entitled WHY vs WHY: Gay Marriage (Pantera Press).

In 2012, Croome became the fourth National Director of Australian Marriage Equality. Croome debated a number of public figures opposed to marriage equality and urged campaigners to demonstrate respect for those critical of the reform. Croome supported Australia's trans and intersex communities in their quest for marriage equality saying, "the marriage equality campaign must be inclusive of all loving committed couples regardless of sex, sexual orientation, gender identity or intersex status".

In 2015, Croome released his latest book, "From This Day Forward: Marriage Equality in Australia" (Walleah Press).

In 2015, Tasmanian Archbishop Julius Porteous distributed a political booklet titled, "Don't mess with Marriage" that advised parents to lobby MPs against same-sex marriage. Croome claimed the booklet denigrated same-sex partners and encouraged parents to submit complaints to the Tasmanian Anti-Discrimination Commissioner.

In August 2016 Croome resigned from Australian Marriage Equality to campaign against the plebiscite proposed by the Turnbull Government. As a spokesperson for Just.Equal Australia he successfully advocated for the Senate to vote down plebiscite legislation in December 2016. In 2017 he helped organise a High Court challenge against the subsequent postal survey. During the postal survey he campaigned for marriage equality on behalf of Tasmanians United for Marriage Equality and praised the Tasmanian Yes vote for being above the national average.

=== Other national advocacy ===
Croome advocated for the removal of the ban on gay and lesbian service personnel in 1991-92. He was a president, board member and spokesperson for the Australian Coalition for Lesbian and Gay Rights in the 1990s and for the Equal Rights Network in the early 2000s. In this role he advocated for marriage equality, the legal recognition of defacto same-sex relationships in superannuation and other areas, for national LGBT discrimination and vilification protections, and for the acceptance of LGBT people as refugees. From 2019 to 2022 he was a leading advocate against the Morrison Government’s Religious Discrimination Bill arguing that it would override existing state LGBT discrimination protections and “allowed discrimination in the name of religion.”

In 2005 Croome was a spokesperson and researcher for the discrimination complaint made by Michael Cain against the Red Cross Blood Service over its refusal to collect blood from sexually-active gay men, and bisexual men and transgender women who have sex with men. In 2022, Croome helped found the Let Us Give campaign and continued his advocacy against the gay blood ban as a spokesperson for that campaign. In June 2025, he welcomed the Therapeutic Goods Administration’s decision to allow sexually active gay men, and bisexual men and transgender women, to donate blood under the same conditions as other donors, but warned that the proposed questions were not best practice.

== Non-LGBT work ==
Croome has been the editor of the Tasmanian literary journal, 'Island', a guide and a research consultant for the Port Arthur Management Authority and the Australian National University-based Freilich Foundation, and an Honorary lecturer Sociology at the University of Tasmania.

He has also written and lectured on Tasmanian history, literature, culture, folklore and story-telling.

== Awards and recognition ==
Croome was made the inaugural recipient of the Tasmanian Humanitarian of the Year Award and awarded the Chris Carter Memorial Award for contributions to the gay and lesbian community by the Australian Democrats in 1991. In 1994, he was shortlisted for Australian of the Year. In January 2001, he was awarded the Centenary Medal for "service and extensive contribution to gay and lesbian law reform" and in June 2003 he was appointed as a Member of the Order of Australia (AM) for "service to the community as a human rights advocate, particularly through promoting tolerance and understanding of the human rights of gay and lesbian people". Croome was named Tasmanian Australian of the Year for 2015, and consequently was a finalist for 2015 Australian of the Year. In 2019 he was made an honorary doctor of letters by the University of Tasmania.

In 2000 Croome was named one of the ten most influential Tasmanians of the 1990s by the Hobart Mercury. In 2009, he was named one of the 25 most influential gay Australians by readers of the website samesame.com.au.

== Publications ==
- Croome, Rodney; Muehlenberg, Bill (2010). WHY vs WHY: Gay Marriage. Sydney: Pantera Press.
- Croome, Rodney (2015). From This Day Forward: Marriage Equality in Australia. Sydney: Walleah Press.
- Croome, Rodney (2017). Devil in the Detail: The choice between true marriage equality and new forms of discrimination against LGBTI Australians: Self published.
