= Melbourne Historical Journal =

Melbourne Historical Journal (MHJ)
- Frequency: annually
- First issue: 1961
- Country: Australia
- Based in: University of Melbourne
- Language: English
- Website: Melbourne Historical Journal Online

The Melbourne Historical Journal (MHJ) is a peer-reviewed academic journal for postgraduate history research based at the University of Melbourne. It is the oldest student-run academic journal in Australia, providing a venue for work by emerging scholars in Australia and New Zealand. It accepts original research articles and book reviews written by postgraduates and commissions feature articles by established academics.

== History ==
In 1961, with the help of Max Crawford The Melbourne Historical Journal was founded by a group of undergraduate students that included Ákos Östör, and John Ritchie. In its first two decades, the journal provided a forum for undergraduate work to be published alongside work of established academic historians. Its first issue notably contained the first published work by Greg Dening and advanced copy from Manning Clark's The History of Australia Volume One. In the 1980s, MHJ became a postgraduate journal, and in the 1990s gained full peer-review status and opened its pages to work from Aotearoa/ New Zealand. In the 1990s and early 2000s, it participated in the black armband debate leading to the distinctive black wrap-around worn on its cover. Former editors include Raewyn Connell, Stuart Macintyre, Elijah Moshinsky, Peter McPhee (academic), Lyndal Roper, and Mark Peel.

== Prize ==
In 2009, the journal launched the Greg Dening Memorial Prize in memory of the noted historian of Pacific history. The Prize was inaugurated to commemorate the journal's links with Dening who had published in the first number in 1961 as a student and subsequently as an invited feature writer in the 1990s and 2000s. It has been awarded to four recipients: Kiera Lindsay (2009), Marianne Schultz (2011), Rula Paterson (2015), and Toby Nash (2016).

== Notable contributors ==
Greg Dening, Manning Clark, Geoffrey Blainey, Dale Kent, Lyndal Roper, JGA Pocock, Joy Damousi, James Belich (historian), and Dipesh Chakrabarty

== See also ==
- Graduate School of Humanities and Social Sciences, University of Melbourne#Journals
